= 1998 IIHF World Championship rosters =

Rosters at the 1998 IIHF World Championship in Switzerland.

== Rosters ==
=== Sweden ===
1. (Sweden)
Goaltenders: Tommy Salo, Johan Hedberg, Magnus Eriksson.
Defenders: Mattias Öhlund, Kim Johnsson, Jan Mertzig, Niclas Hävelid, Mattias Norström, Hans Jonsson, Johan Tornberg, Christer Olsson.
Forwards: Anders Huusko, Mikael Johansson, Tommy Westlund, Mats Sundin, Nichlas Falk, Jonas Bergqvist, Mikael Renberg, Peter Forsberg, Ulf Dahlén, Peter Nordström, Patric Kjellberg, Jörgen Jönsson, Fredrik Modin, Niklas Sundström.
Coaches: Kent Forsberg, Tommy Tomth.

=== Finland ===
2. (Finland)
Goaltenders: Ari Sulander, Jarmo Myllys, Vesa Toskala.
Defencemen: Kimmo Timonen, Jere Karalahti, Marko Kiprusoff, Toni Lydman, Janne Laukkanen, Petteri Nummelin, Antti-Jussi Niemi, Kaj Linna.
Forwards: Raimo Helminen, Ville Peltonen, Sami Kapanen, Antti Törmänen, Juha Ikonen, Mika Alatalo, Mikko Eloranta, Kimmo Rintanen, Jarkko Ruutu, Joni Lius, Olli Jokinen, Marko Tuomainen, Toni Mäkiaho.
Coaches: Hannu Aravirta, Esko Nokelainen, Jari Kaarela.

=== Czech Republic ===
3. (Czech Republic)
Goaltenders: Milan Hnilička, Roman Čechmánek, Martin Prusek.
Defencemen: František Kučera, František Kaberle, Jiří Vykoukal, Libor Procházka, Robert Kántor, Jiří Šlégr, Jiří Veber, Václav Burda.
Forwards: Radek Bělohlav, Pavel Patera, Martin Procházka, David Výborný, Ladislav Lubina, Jiří Dopita, Marián Kacíř, Jan Hlaváč, Robert Reichel, Petr Sýkora, Josef Beránek, David Moravec, Patrik Eliáš, Milan Hejduk.
Coaches: Ivan Hlinka, Slavomír Lener, Vladimír Martinec.

=== Switzerland ===
4. (Switzerland)
Goaltenders: Reto Pavoni, David Aebischer.
Defencemen: Patrick Sutter, Martin Steinegger, Mathias Sieger, Edgar Salis, Dino Kessler, Mark Streit, Martin Rauch, Olivier Keller.
Forwards: Marcel Jenni, Gian-Marco Crameri, Reto Von Arx, Patrick Fischer, Peter Jaks, Michel Zeiter, Misko Antisin, Claudio Micheli, Martin Plüss, Ivo Rüthemann, Michel Riesen, Sandy Jeannin, Franz Steffen, Mattia Baldi.
Coaches: Ralph Krueger.

=== Russia ===
5. (Russia)
Goaltenders: Yegor Podomatsky, Maxim Sokolov, Oleg Shevtsov.
Defencemen: Marat Davydov, Sergei Fokin, Dmitri Yerofeyev, Dmitri Yushkevich, Danny Markov, Andrei Skopintsev, Sergei Zhukov.
Forwards: Sergei Berezin, Oleg Belov, Alexei Chupin, Alexei Kovalev, Viktor Kozlov, Alexei Kudashov, Alexei Morozov, Andrei Nazarov, Sergei Nemchinov, Sergei Petrenko, Oleg Petrov, Vitali Prokhorov, Mikhail Sarmatin.
Coach: Alexander Yakushev.

=== Canada ===
6. (Canada)
Goaltenders: Jeff Hackett, Félix Potvin.
Defencemen: Ed Jovanovski, Bryan McCabe, Cory Cross, Gord Murphy, Rob Blake, James Patrick, Mickey Elick.
Forwards: Ray Whitney, Trevor Linden, Éric Dazé, Keith Primeau, Nelson Emerson, Todd Bertuzzi, Steve Rucchin, Glen Murray, Travis Green, Rob Zamuner, Martin Gélinas, Chris Gratton.
Coach: Andy Murray.

=== Slovakia ===
7. (Slovakia)
Goaltenders: Pavol Rybár, Miroslav Šimonovič, Miroslav Michálek.
Defencemen: Jerguš Bača, Róbert Pukalovič, Ľubomír Višňovský, Ľubomír Sekeráš, Stanislav Jasečko, Ivan Droppa, Róbert Švehla.
Forwards: Roman Stantien, Peter Pucher, Jozef Stümpel, René Pucher, Jozef Voskár, Zdeno Cíger, Branislav Jánoš, Igor Rataj, Ján Pardavý, Peter Bartoš, Radoslav Kropáč, Richard Kapuš, Jozef Daňo.
Coaches: Ján Šterbák, František Hossa.

=== Belarus ===
8. (Belarus)
Goaltenders: Alexander Gavrilenok, Andrei Mezin.
Defencemen: Oleg Romanov, Igor Matushkin, Sergei Stas, Ruslan Salei, Oleg Mikulchik, Sergei Jerkovitsh, Oleg Khmyl.
Forwards: Vadim Bekbulatov, Alexei Kalyuzhny, Vasili Pankov, Dmitry Pankov, Alexander Andrijevski, Andrei Skabelka, Aleksey Lozhkin, Sergei Shytkovsky, Oleg Antonenko, Alexander Galchenyuk, Andrei Kovalev, Viktor Karachun.
Coaches: Anatoli Varivonchik.

=== Latvia ===
9. (Latvia)
Goaltenders: Juris Klodāns, Artūrs Irbe.
Defencemen: Sandis Ozoliņš, Sergejs Cudinovs, Normunds Sējējs, Kārlis Skrastiņš, Rodrigo Laviņš, Igors Bondarevs, Andrei Matytsin, Atvars Tribuncovs.
Forwards: Olegs Znaroks, Harijs Viloliņš, Aleksandrs Kercs, Leonids Tambijevs, Aleksandrs Ņiživijs, Aigars Cipruss, Andrei Ignatovics, Alexander Beliavski, Herberts Vasiļjevs, Aleksandrs Semjonovs, Juris Opuļskis, Igors Pavlovs.
Coach: Leonīds Beresņevs.

=== Italy ===
10. (Italy)
Goaltenders: Mario Brunetta, Andrea Carpano, Mike Rosati.
Defencemen: Leo Insam, Robert Oberrauch, Michele Strazzabosco, Christopher Bartolone, Lawrence Rucchin, Giovanni Marchetti, Mike de Angelis.
Forwards: Lucio Topatigh, Mansi Maurizio, Gates Orlando, Mario Chitaroni, Bruno Zarrillo, Roland Ramoser, Tony Iob, Armando Chelodi, Joe Busillo, Stefano Margoni, Markus Brunner, Alexander Geschliesser.
Coach: Adolf Insam.

=== Germany ===
11. (Germany)
Goaltenders: Kai Fischer, Joseph Heiß, Marc Seliger.
Defencemen: Sasha Goc, Stefan Mayer, Daniel Nowak, Klaus Micheller, Erich Goldmann, Lars Brüggemann, Michael Bresagk.
Forwards: Dieter Hegen, Peter Draisaitl, Mark MacKay, Andreas Lupzig, Jürgen Rumrich, Jochen Hecht, Sven Felski, Leo Stefan, Florain Keller, Reemt Pyka, Christoph Sandner, Christopher Straube, Rainer Zerwesz.
Coach: George Kingston.

=== United States ===
12. (United States)
Goaltenders: Mike Dunham, Garth Snow, Tim Thomas.
Defencemen: Eric Weinrich, Al Iafrate, Mike Crowley, Greg Brown, Adam Burt, Chris Luongo, Paul Stanton, Dan Trebil, Kevin Dean.
Forwards: Bryan Smolinski, Matt Cullen, Chris Drury, Bates Battaglia, Tom Chorske, Darby Hendrickson, Ted Drury, Kevin Miller, Donald Brashear, Mark Parrish, Shjon Podein, Doug Barrault.
Coach: Jeff Jackson.

=== France ===
13. (France)
Goaltenders: Francois Gravel, Cristobal Huet, Fabrice Lhenry.
Defencemen: Jean-Christophe Filippin, Karl Dewolf, Denis Perez, Jean-Philippe Lemoine, Gérald Guennelon, Steven Woodburn, Stephane Gachet.
Forwards: Philippe Bozon, Stanislas Solaux, Richard Aimonetto, Stephane Barin, Jonathan Zwikel, Maurice Rozenthal, Arnaud Briand, Anthony Mortas, Laurent Gras, Fracois Rozenthal, Pierre Allard, Roger Dube, Robert Ouellet.
Coach: Herb Brooks.

=== Japan ===
14. (Japan)
Goaltenders: Dusty Imoo, Shinichi Iwasaki, Jiro Nihei.
Defencemen: Takeshi Yamanaka, Tatsuki Katayama, Takayuki Kobori, Hiroyuki Miura, Daniel Daikawa, Yutaka Kawaguchi, Takayuki Miura, Fumitaka Miyauchi.
Forwards: Shin Yahata, Toshiyuki Sakai, Ryan Kuwabara, Matthew Kabayama, Yasunori Iwata, Kiyoshi Fujita, Hiroshi Matsuura, Akihito Sugisawa, Tsutsumi Otomo, Masaki Shirono, Junji Sakata, Hideji Tsuchida.
Coach: Masaru Seino.

=== Austria ===
15. (Austria)
Goaltenders: Claus Dalpiaz, Reinhard Divis.
Defencemen: Gerhard Unterluggauer, Tom Searle, Martin Ulrich, Herbert Hohenberger, Michael Lampert, Englebert Linder, Michael Güntner.
Forwards: Simon Wheeldom, Dieter Kalt, Andreas Pusnik, Christoph Brandner, Christian Perthaler, Gerald Ressman, Wolfgang Kromp, Günther Lanzinger, Mario Schaden, Normand Krumpschmid, Rick Nasheim, Patrick Piloni, Gerhard Pusnik.
Coach: Ron Kennedy.

=== Kazakhstan ===
16. (Kazakhstan)
Goaltenders: Roman Krivomazov, Aleksandr Shimin, Vitali Yeremeyev.
Defencemen: Vadim Glovatsky, Alexei Troshchinski, Vitaly Tregubov, Vladimir Antipin, Igor Nikitin, Igor Zemlyanoy, Viktor Bystryantsev, Andrei Sokolov.
Forwards: Andrei Pchelyakov, Alexander Koreshkov, Mikhail Borodulin, Pavel Kamentsev, Nikolai Antropov, Dmitri Dudarev, Yevgeniy Koreshkov, Oleg Kryazhev, Andrei Raisky, Konstantin Shafranov, Andrei Troshchinski, Erlan Sagymbayev.
Coach: Boris Alexandrov.
