= 1999 IIHF World Championship rosters =

Rosters at the 1999 IIHF World Championships in Norway.

== Rosters ==
=== Austria ===
Goalkeepers: Reinhard Divis, Claus Dalpiaz, Michael Suttnig.
Defenders and Forwards: Andreas Puschnig, Christoph Brandner, Gerald Ressman, Richard Nassheim, Dieter Kalt, Matthias Trattnig, Dominic Lavoie, Normand Krumpschmid, Christian Perthaler, Christoph König, Martin Ulrich, Tom Searle, Raymond Podloski, Gerhard Unterluggauer, Mario Schaden, Herbert Hohenberger, Günther Lanzinger, Michael Guntner, Peter Kasper, André Lakos.
Coach: Ron Kennedy.

=== Belarus ===
Goalkeepers: Andrei Mezin, Leonid Fatikov.
Defenders and Forwards: Andrei Kovalev, Vladimir Tsyplakov, Viktor Karachun, Oleg Antonenko, Vasili Pankov, Oleg Khmyl, Alexander Andrievsky, Dmitry Pankov, Alexei Kalyuzhny, Andrei Skabelka, Vadim Bekbulatov, Oleg Leontiev, Oleg Romanov, Alexander Galchenyuk, Yuri Krivokhizha, Igor Matushkin, Konstantin Koltsov, Alexander Zhurik, Vladimir Kopat, Oleg Mikulchik.
Coach: Anatoli Varivonchik.

=== Canada ===
Goalkeepers: Ron Tugnutt, Rick Tabaracci, Fred Brathwaite
Defenders: Doug Bodger, Rob Blake, Stéphane Quintal, Sean O'Donnell, Wade Redden, Bryan McCabe, Derek Morris
Forwards: Adam Graves, Claude Lapointe, Ray Whitney, Cory Stillman, Shane Doan, Scott Walker, Scott Thornton, Chris Szysky, Jeff Friesen, Patrick Marleau, Rob Niedermayer, Brian Savage, Éric Dazé, Ryan Smyth
Coaches: Mike Johnston, Willie Desjardins, Dave King

=== Czech Republic ===
Goalkeepers: Roman Čechmánek, Milan Hnilička, Martin Prusek.
Defenders: František Kučera, Ladislav Benýšek, Libor Procházka, František Kaberle, Jiří Vykoukal, Pavel Kubina, Jaroslav Špaček.
Forwards: Jan Hlaváč, David Výborný, Pavel Patera (C), Martin Procházka, Viktor Ujčík, David Moravec, Roman Meluzín, Tomáš Kucharčík, Tomáš Vlasák, Roman Šimíček, Jan Čaloun, Radek Dvořák, Martin Ručinský, Petr Sýkora .
Coaches: Ivan Hlinka, Josef Augusta, Vladimír Martinec.

=== Finland ===
Goalkeepers: Miikka Kiprusoff, Ari Sulander, Vesa Toskala.
Defenders: Marko Kiprusoff, Petteri Nummelin, Kimmo Timonen, Aki-Petteri Berg, Kari Martikainen, Antti-Jussi Niemi, Toni Lydman, Jere Karalahti.
Forwards: Teemu Selänne, Saku Koivu, Olli Jokinen, Raimo Helminen, Antti Törmänen, Ville Peltonen, Tomi Kallio, Mikko Eloranta, Toni Sihvonen, Juha Lind, Kimmo Rintanen, Marko Tuomainen.
Coaches: Hannu Aravirta, Esko Nokelainen, Jari Kaarela.

=== France ===
Goalkeepers: Cristobal Huet, Francois Gravel.
Defenders and Forwards: Arnaud Briand, Bob Ouellet, Serge Poudrier, Pierre Allard, Philippe Bozon, Denis Perez, Stéphane Barin, Maurice Rozenthal, Richard Aimonetto, Frank Guillemard, Laurent Meunier, François Rozenthal, Karl Dewolf, Anthony Mortas, Benoît Bachelet, Grégory Dubois, Jean-Christophe Filippin, Gerald Guennelon, Christian Pouget, Jean-Philippe Lemoine.
Coach: Mikael Lundstrom

=== Italy ===
Goalkeepers: Andrea Carpano, Jim Mazzoli, Bruno Campese.
Defenders and Forwards: Chris Bartolone, Lucio Topatigh, Giuseppe Busillo, Mario Chitaroni, Maurizio Mansi, Georg Comploi, Roland Ramoser, Michael de Angelis, Gates Orlando, Dino Felicetti, Armando Chelodi, Giuseppe Ciccarello, Stefano Margoni, Michele Strazzabosco, Chad Biafore, Manuel de Toni, Larry Rucchin, Lino de Toni, Carlo Lorenzi, Giovanni Marchetti.
Coach: Adolf Insam

=== Japan ===
Goalkeepers: Shinichi Iwasaki, Dusty Imoo.
Defenders and Forwards: Takahito Suzuki, Takeshi Yamanaka, Shin Yahata, Toshiyuki Sakai, Yujiro Nakajimaya, Junji Sakata, Yasunori Iwata, Chris Yule, Daniel Daikawa, Yoshikazu Kabayama, Tatsuki Katayama, Akihito Sugisawa, Akihito Isojima, Masaki Shirono, Hiroshi Matsuura, Hiroyuki Murakami, Kunio Tagaki, Masakazu Sato, Takayuki Kobori, Yutaka Kawaguchi.
Coach: Steve Tsujiura

=== Latvia ===
Goalkeepers: Artūrs Irbe, Andrejs Zinkovs, Juris Klodāns.
Defenders and Forwards: Aigars Cipruss, Vjačeslavs Fanduļs, Aleksandrs Belavskis, Andrejs Maticins, Sergejs Žoltoks, Leonids Tambijevs, Aleksandrs Ņiživijs, Aleksandrs Semjonovs, Aleksandrs Kerčs, Sergejs Cudinovs, Kārlis Skrastiņš, Andrejs Ignatovičs, Harijs Vītoliņš, Mareks Jass, Atvars Tribuncovs, Normunds Sējējs, Oleg Znarok, Artis Ābols, Rodrigo Laviņš, Mihails Bogdanovs.
Coach: Leonids Beresnevs

=== Norway ===
Goalkeepers: Robert Schistad, Øivind Sørli, Bjørge Josefsen.
Defenders and Forwards: Lars-Håkon Andersen, Per-Åge Skrøder, Tore Vikingstad, Mats Trygg, Ole Eskild Dahlstrøm, Svein Enok Nørstebø, Trond Magnussen, Tommy Jakobsen, Andre Hansen-Manskow, Sjur Robert Nilsen, Martin Knold, Marius Trygg, Anders Myrvold, Henrik Aaby, Morten Fjeld, Pål Johnsen, Carl Bøe-Andersen, Geir Svendsberget, Ketil Wold, Bård Sørlie.
Coach: Leif Boork.

=== Russia ===
Goalkeepers: Andrei Tsarev, Yegor Podomatsky.
Defenders: Sergei Bautin, Dmitri Bykov, Alexander Khavanov, Andrei Yakhanov, Andrei Markov, Artur Okťiabrev, Sergei Tertyshny, Vitali Vishnevskiy.
Forwards: Maxim Afinogenov, Alexander Barkov, Ravil Gusmanov, Alexei Yashin, Valeri Karpov, Alexei Kudashov, Sergei Petrenko, Oleg Petrov, Alexander Prokopiev, Mikhail Sarmatin, Dmitri Subbotin, Maxim Sushinski.
Coach: Alexander Yakushev.

=== Slovakia ===
Goalkeepers: Miroslav Šimonovič, Igor Murín, Rastislav Rovnianek.
Defenders: Radoslav Hecl, Zdeno Chára, Stanislav Jasečko, Vladimír Vlk, Ľubomír Višňovský, Ivan Droppa, Ľubomír Sekeráš, Daniel Babka.
Forwards: René Pucher, Peter Pucher, Richard Kapuš, Ján Lipiansky, Zdeno Cíger, Marián Hossa, Ján Pardavý, Peter Bartoš, Richard Šechný, Ľubomír Kolník, Jozef Daňo, Žigmund Pálffy.
Coach: Ján Šterbák .

=== Sweden ===
Goalkeepers: Johan Hedberg, Petter Rönnquist, Tommy Salo.
Defenders: Per Djoos, Anders Eriksson, Jan Huokko, Thomas Johansson, Kim Johnsson, Hans Jonsson, Jörgen Jönsson, Christer Olsson.
Forwards: Daniel Alfredsson, Nichlas Falk, Jan Larsson, Jesper Mattsson, Ove Molin, Peter Nordström, Markus Näslund, Michael Nylander, Samuel Påhlsson, Daniel Sedin, Henrik Sedin, Niklas Sundström.
Coaches: Stefan Lundh, Sune Bergman, Stefan Lunner.

=== Switzerland ===
Goalkeepers: Reto Pavoni, Pauli Jaks, David Aebischer.
Defenders: Martin Steinegger, Patrik Sutter, Mark Streit, Benjamin Winkler, Philippe Marquis, Olivier Keller, Mathias Seger.
Forwards: Mattia Baldi, Ivo Rüthemann, Patric Della Rossa, Reto von Arx, Gian-Marco Crameri, Martin Plüss, Patrick Fischer, Geoffrey Vauclair, Michel Zeiter, Marcel Jenni, Sandro Rizzi, Sandy Jeannin.
Coach: Ralph Krüger.

=== Ukraine ===
Goalkeepers: Yuri Shundrov, Olexander Vyukhin.
Defenders and Forwards: Serhiy Klymentiev, Vitaliy Lytvynenko, Oleg Synkov, Olexander Savitsky, Vasyl Bobrovnikov, Alexander Godynyuk, Viktor Goncharenko, Kostiantyn Kasianchuk, Artyom Ostroushko, Roman Salnikov, Yuri Gunko, Danylo Didkovskiy, Valeri Shyriaiev, Vadym Shakhraychuk, Vyacheslav Zavalnyuk.
Coach: Anatoli Bogdanov.

=== United States ===
Goalkeepers: Parris Duffus, Tim Thomas.
Defenders: Mike Mottau, Chris Tamer, Bret Hedican, Barry Richter, Dan Keczmer, Scott Lachance, Eric Weinrich.
Forwards: Mike Knuble, Tom Bissett, Kelly Miller, Matt Cullen, David Emma, Darby Hendrickson, Tom Chorske, David Legwand, Ted Donato, Bryan Smolinski, Trent Klatt, Craig Johnson, Jay Pandolfo.
Coach: Terry Murray.
