= Ice hockey at the 1998 Winter Olympics – Men's team rosters =

The ice hockey team rosters of the nations participating in the men's ice hockey tournament of the 1998 Winter Olympics for the men's tournament consisted of the following players:

== Austria ==
Head coach: (Canada) Ron Kennedy

No.	Pos.	Name	Height	Weight	Birthdate	Team
1	G	Claus Dalpiaz	5 ft 9 in (175 cm)	154 lb (70 kg)	October 10, 1971 (aged 26)	(Germany) Starbulls Rosenheim
2	D	Michael Lampert	5 ft 11 in (180 cm)	198 lb (90 kg)	July 17, 1972 (aged 25)	(Austria) VEU Feldkirch
5	D	Gerhard Unterluggauer	5 ft 10 in (178 cm)	194 lb (88 kg)	August 15, 1976 (aged 21)	(Austria) EC VSV
6	D	Dominic Lavoie	6 ft 2 in (188 cm)	212 lb (96 kg)	November 21, 1967 (aged 30)	(Austria) VEU Feldkirch
9	D	Tom Searle	5 ft 11 in (180 cm)	190 lb (86 kg)	April 26, 1963 (aged 34)	(Austria) VEU Feldkirch
10	F	Christoph Brandner	6 ft 5 in (196 cm)	214 lb (97 kg)	July 5, 1975 (aged 22)	(Austria) EC KAC
11	F	Martin Hohenberger	6 ft 1 in (185 cm)	207 lb (94 kg)	January 29, 1977 (aged 21)	(United States) New Orleans Brass
11	F	Gerald Ressman	6 ft 4 in (193 cm)	225 lb (102 kg)	July 24, 1970 (aged 27)	(Austria) EC VSV
12	F	Gerhard Pusnik	5 ft 9 in (175 cm)	185 lb (84 kg)	October 16, 1966 (aged 31)	(Austria) VEU Feldkirch
12	F	Andreas Pusnik	5 ft 10 in (178 cm)	190 lb (86 kg)	September 7, 1972 (aged 25)	(Austria) EC VSV
14	D	Engelbert Linder	6 ft 3 in (191 cm)	214 lb (97 kg)	July 18, 1962 (aged 35)	(Austria) EC VSV
16	F	Rick Nasheim	5 ft 11 in (180 cm)	187 lb (85 kg)	January 15, 1963 (aged 35)	(Austria) VEU Feldkirch
19	F	Normand Krumpschmid	5 ft 11 in (180 cm)	187 lb (85 kg)	December 13, 1969 (aged 28)	(Austria) Wiener EV
20	F	Patrik Pilloni	6 ft 0 in (183 cm)	181 lb (82 kg)	February 21, 1970 (aged 27)	(Austria) EC KAC
21	F	Mario Schaden	5 ft 8 in (173 cm)	187 lb (85 kg)	April 30, 1972 (aged 25)	(Austria) EC KAC
23	G	Michael Puschacher	6 ft 2 in (188 cm)	185 lb (84 kg)	September 15, 1968 (aged 29)	(Austria) EC KAC
25	G	Reinhard Divis	6 ft 0 in (183 cm)	192 lb (87 kg)	July 4, 1975 (aged 22)	(Austria) VEU Feldkirch
26	F	Simon Wheeldon	6 ft 0 in (183 cm)	185 lb (84 kg)	August 30, 1966 (aged 31)	(Austria) VEU Feldkirch
27	D/F	Wolfgang Kromp	5 ft 9 in (175 cm)	187 lb (85 kg)	September 17, 1970 (aged 27)	(Austria) EC VSV
29	F	Christian Perthaler	6 ft 0 in (183 cm)	198 lb (90 kg)	July 21, 1968 (aged 29)	(Austria) EC KAC
30	D	Herbert Hohenberger (C)	6 ft 0 in (183 cm)	194 lb (88 kg)	February 8, 1969 (aged 28)	(Germany) Kölner Haie
47	D	Martin Ulrich	6 ft 2 in (188 cm)	209 lb (95 kg)	December 16, 1969 (aged 28)	(Germany) Adler Mannheim
74	F	Dieter Kalt	5 ft 9 in (175 cm)	183 lb (83 kg)	June 26, 1974 (aged 23)	(Germany) Adler Mannheim

== Belarus ==
Head coach: Anatoli Varivonchik

Assistant coach: Mikhail Zakharov

No.	Pos.	Name	Height	Weight	Birthdate	Team
1	G	Alexander Shumidub	5 ft 8 in (173 cm)	196 lb (89 kg)	March 7, 1964 (aged 33)	(Belarus) Polomir Novopolotsk
3	D	Oleg Khmyl	6 ft 0 in (183 cm)	218 lb (99 kg)	January 30, 1970 (aged 28)	(Russia) Lada Togliatti
5	D	Oleg Romanov	6 ft 0 in (183 cm)	187 lb (85 kg)	March 31, 1970 (aged 27)	(Russia) Lada Togliatti
6	D	Igor Matushkin	6 ft 2 in (188 cm)	207 lb (94 kg)	January 27, 1965 (aged 33)	(Sweden) Bodens IK
7	D	Sergei Yerkovich	6 ft 3 in (191 cm)	207 lb (94 kg)	March 9, 1974 (aged 23)	(United States) Las Vegas Thunder
8	F	Alexei Lozhkin	5 ft 9 in (175 cm)	183 lb (83 kg)	February 21, 1974 (aged 23)	(Canada) Fredericton Canadiens
9	F	Alexander Andriyevsky (C)	6 ft 5 in (196 cm)	212 lb (96 kg)	August 10, 1968 (aged 29)	(Finland) HPK
10	F	Viktor Karachun	6 ft 2 in (188 cm)	196 lb (89 kg)	August 12, 1968 (aged 29)	(Germany) Augsburger Panther
11	F	Vadim Bekbulatov	6 ft 1 in (185 cm)	192 lb (87 kg)	March 8, 1970 (aged 27)	(Russia) Severstal Cherepovets
13	F	Andrei Kovalev	6 ft 0 in (183 cm)	185 lb (84 kg)	April 2, 1966 (aged 31)	(Germany) Krefeld Pinguine
14	F	Vasili Pankov (A)	6 ft 0 in (183 cm)	187 lb (85 kg)	August 15, 1968 (aged 29)	(Slovakia) HC Slovan Bratislava
15	D	Alexander Alexeyev	6 ft 2 in (188 cm)	187 lb (85 kg)	January 8, 1968 (aged 30)	(Denmark) Rungsted Cobras
16	F	Andrei Skabelka	6 ft 1 in (185 cm)	203 lb (92 kg)	January 20, 1971 (aged 27)	(Russia) Torpedo Yaroslavl
17	F	Alexei Kalyuzhny	5 ft 10 in (178 cm)	187 lb (85 kg)	June 13, 1977 (aged 20)	(Russia) Dynamo Moskva
19	F	Eduard Zankovets	5 ft 10 in (178 cm)	172 lb (78 kg)	September 27, 1969 (aged 28)	(Germany) ES Weißwasser
21	F	Yevgeni Roschin	6 ft 2 in (188 cm)	203 lb (92 kg)	May 28, 1962 (aged 35)	(Slovakia) HKM Zvolen
23	D	Ruslan Salei (A)	6 ft 2 in (188 cm)	205 lb (93 kg)	November 2, 1974 (aged 23)	(United States) Mighty Ducks of Anaheim
25	D	Alexander Zhurik	6 ft 4 in (193 cm)	220 lb (100 kg)	May 29, 1975 (aged 22)	(Canada) Hamilton Bulldogs
29	F	Vladimir Tsyplakov	6 ft 2 in (188 cm)	192 lb (87 kg)	April 18, 1969 (aged 28)	(United States) Los Angeles Kings
30	G	Andrei Mezin	6 ft 0 in (183 cm)	172 lb (78 kg)	July 8, 1974 (aged 23)	(United States) Flint Generals
31	G	Leonid Grishukevich	5 ft 10 in (178 cm)	176 lb (80 kg)	March 30, 1978 (aged 19)	(Belarus) Yunost Minsk
55	F	Alexander Galchenyuk	5 ft 11 in (180 cm)	192 lb (87 kg)	July 28, 1967 (aged 30)	(United States) Michigan K-Wings
95	D/F	Sergei Stas	6 ft 0 in (183 cm)	181 lb (82 kg)	April 28, 1974 (aged 23)	(Germany) Nürnberg Ice Tigers

== Canada ==
Head coach: Marc Crawford

Assistant coaches: Wayne Cashman, Mike Johnston, Andy Murray

No.	Pos.	Name	Height	Weight	Birthdate	Team
2	D	Al MacInnis	6 ft 2 in (188 cm)	201 lb (91 kg)	July 11, 1963 (aged 34)	(United States) St. Louis Blues
4	D	Scott Stevens	6 ft 2 in (188 cm)	216 lb (98 kg)	April 1, 1964 (aged 33)	(United States) New Jersey Devils
7	F	Rob Zamuner	6 ft 1 in (185 cm)	205 lb (93 kg)	September 7, 1969 (aged 28)	(United States) Tampa Bay Lightning
8	F	Mark Recchi	5 ft 10 in (178 cm)	194 lb (88 kg)	February 1, 1968 (aged 30)	(Canada) Montreal Canadiens
14	F	Brendan Shanahan	6 ft 3 in (191 cm)	220 lb (100 kg)	January 23, 1969 (aged 29)	(United States) Detroit Red Wings
16	F	Trevor Linden	6 ft 4 in (193 cm)	209 lb (95 kg)	April 11, 1970 (aged 27)	(Canada) Vancouver Canucks
17	F	Rod Brind'Amour	6 ft 1 in (185 cm)	205 lb (93 kg)	August 9, 1970 (aged 27)	(United States) Philadelphia Flyers
19	F	Steve Yzerman (A)	5 ft 11 in (180 cm)	185 lb (84 kg)	May 9, 1965 (aged 32)	(United States) Detroit Red Wings
24	D	Chris Pronger	6 ft 6 in (198 cm)	220 lb (100 kg)	October 10, 1974 (aged 23)	(United States) St. Louis Blues
25	F	Joe Nieuwendyk	6 ft 2 in (188 cm)	203 lb (92 kg)	September 10, 1966 (aged 31)	(United States) Dallas Stars
27	F	Shayne Corson	6 ft 2 in (188 cm)	207 lb (94 kg)	August 13, 1966 (aged 31)	(Canada) Montreal Canadiens
30	G	Martin Brodeur	6 ft 2 in (188 cm)	220 lb (100 kg)	May 6, 1972 (aged 25)	(United States) New Jersey Devils
31	G	Curtis Joseph	5 ft 11 in (180 cm)	194 lb (88 kg)	April 29, 1967 (aged 30)	(Canada) Edmonton Oilers
33	G	Patrick Roy	6 ft 2 in (188 cm)	192 lb (87 kg)	October 5, 1965 (aged 32)	(United States) Colorado Avalanche
37	D	Éric Desjardins	6 ft 1 in (185 cm)	203 lb (92 kg)	June 14, 1969 (aged 28)	(United States) Philadelphia Flyers
44	D	Rob Blake	6 ft 4 in (193 cm)	220 lb (100 kg)	December 10, 1969 (aged 28)	(United States) Los Angeles Kings
52	D	Adam Foote	6 ft 2 in (188 cm)	227 lb (103 kg)	July 10, 1971 (aged 26)	(United States) Colorado Avalanche
55	F	Keith Primeau	6 ft 5 in (196 cm)	220 lb (100 kg)	November 24, 1971 (aged 26)	(United States) Carolina Hurricanes
74	F	Theo Fleury	5 ft 6 in (168 cm)	181 lb (82 kg)	June 29, 1968 (aged 29)	(Canada) Calgary Flames
77	D	Ray Bourque	5 ft 11 in (180 cm)	216 lb (98 kg)	December 28, 1960 (aged 37)	(United States) Boston Bruins
88	F	Eric Lindros (C)	6 ft 4 in (193 cm)	240 lb (110 kg)	February 28, 1973 (aged 24)	(United States) Philadelphia Flyers
91	F	Joe Sakic (A)	5 ft 11 in (180 cm)	194 lb (88 kg)	July 7, 1969 (aged 28)	(United States) Colorado Avalanche
99	F	Wayne Gretzky (A)	6 ft 0 in (183 cm)	185 lb (84 kg)	January 26, 1961 (aged 37)	(United States) New York Rangers

== Czech Republic ==
Head coach: Ivan Hlinka

Assistant coaches: Slavomir Lener, Vladimir Martinec

No.	Pos.	Name	Height	Weight	Birthdate	Team
3	G	Milan Hnilička	6 ft 1 in (185 cm)	185 lb (84 kg)	June 25, 1973 (aged 24)	(Czech Republic) HC Sparta Praha
4	D	Frantisek Kučera	6 ft 2 in (188 cm)	205 lb (93 kg)	February 3, 1968 (aged 30)	(Czech Republic) HC Sparta Praha
5	D	Libor Procházka	6 ft 1 in (185 cm)	185 lb (84 kg)	April 25, 1974 (aged 23)	(Sweden) AIK
6	D	Jaroslav Špaček	5 ft 11 in (180 cm)	203 lb (92 kg)	February 11, 1974 (aged 23)	(Sweden) Fäjestad BK
10	F	Pavel Patera	6 ft 1 in (185 cm)	187 lb (85 kg)	September 6, 1971 (aged 26)	(Sweden) AIK
13	F	Robert Lang	6 ft 3 in (191 cm)	212 lb (96 kg)	December 19, 1970 (aged 27)	(United States) Pittsburgh Penguins
16	F	Jan Čaloun	5 ft 10 in (178 cm)	185 lb (84 kg)	December 20, 1972 (aged 25)	(Finland) HIFK
20	F	Martin Procházka	5 ft 11 in (180 cm)	181 lb (82 kg)	March 3, 1972 (aged 25)	(Canada) Toronto Maple Leafs
21	F	Robert Reichel (A)	5 ft 10 in (178 cm)	183 lb (83 kg)	June 25, 1971 (aged 26)	(United States) New York Islanders
22	F	David Moravec	6 ft 0 in (183 cm)	201 lb (91 kg)	March 24, 1973 (aged 24)	(Czech Republic) HC Vitkovice
23	D	Petr Svoboda	6 ft 1 in (185 cm)	198 lb (90 kg)	February 14, 1966 (aged 31)	(United States) Philadelphia Flyers
24	F	Milan Hejduk	6 ft 0 in (183 cm)	192 lb (87 kg)	February 14, 1976 (aged 21)	(Czech Republic) HC Pardubice
26	F	Martin Ručinský	6 ft 2 in (188 cm)	209 lb (95 kg)	March 11, 1971 (aged 26)	(Canada) Montreal Canadiens
28	F	Martin Straka	5 ft 9 in (175 cm)	174 lb (79 kg)	September 3, 1972 (aged 25)	(United States) Pittsburgh Penguins
29	G	Roman Čechmánek	6 ft 3 in (191 cm)	201 lb (91 kg)	March 2, 1971 (aged 26)	(Czech Republic) HC Vsetín
30	F	Jiří Dopita	6 ft 4 in (193 cm)	227 lb (103 kg)	December 2, 1968 (aged 29)	(Czech Republic) HC Vsetín
32	D	Richard Šmehlík	6 ft 4 in (193 cm)	222 lb (101 kg)	January 23, 1970 (aged 28)	(United States) Buffalo Sabres
39	G	Dominik Hašek	6 ft 1 in (185 cm)	166 lb (75 kg)	January 29, 1965 (aged 33)	(United States) Buffalo Sabres
42	F	Josef Beránek	6 ft 2 in (188 cm)	185 lb (84 kg)	October 25, 1969 (aged 28)	(Czech Republic) HC Vsetín
44	D	Roman Hamrlík	6 ft 2 in (188 cm)	223 lb (101 kg)	April 12, 1974 (aged 23)	(United States) Tampa Bay Lightning
68	F	Jaromír Jágr (A)	6 ft 3 in (191 cm)	230 lb (100 kg)	February 15, 1972 (aged 25)	(United States) Pittsburgh Penguins
71	D	Jiří Šlégr	6 ft 1 in (185 cm)	210 lb (95 kg)	May 30, 1971 (aged 26)	(United States) Pittsburgh Penguins
97	F	Vladimír Růžička (C)	6 ft 3 in (191 cm)	210 lb (95 kg)	June 6, 1963 (aged 34)	(Czech Republic) HC Slavia Praha

== Finland ==
Head coach: Hannu Aravirta

Assistant coach: Esko Nokelainen

No.	Pos.	Name	Height	Weight	Birthdate	Team
4	D	Kimmo Timonen	5 ft 10 in (178 cm)	194 lb (88 kg)	March 18, 1975 (aged 22)	(Finland) HIFK
5	D	Aki Berg	6 ft 4 in (193 cm)	214 lb (97 kg)	July 28, 1977 (aged 20)	(United States) Los Angeles Kings
6	D	Tuomas Grönman	6 ft 4 in (193 cm)	198 lb (90 kg)	March 22, 1974 (aged 23)	(United States) Syracuse Crunch
8	F	Teemu Selänne	6 ft 0 in (183 cm)	201 lb (91 kg)	July 3, 1970 (aged 27)	(United States) Mighty Ducks of Anaheim
10	F	Esa Tikkanen	6 ft 1 in (185 cm)	209 lb (95 kg)	January 25, 1965 (aged 33)	(United States) Florida Panthers
11	F	Saku Koivu (C)	5 ft 10 in (178 cm)	181 lb (82 kg)	November 23, 1974 (aged 23)	(Canada) Montreal Canadiens
12	D	Janne Laukkanen	6 ft 0 in (183 cm)	187 lb (85 kg)	March 19, 1970 (aged 27)	(Canada) Ottawa Senators
14	F	Raimo Helminen	6 ft 0 in (183 cm)	194 lb (88 kg)	March 11, 1964 (aged 33)	(Finland) Ilves
15	F	Antti Törmänen	6 ft 1 in (185 cm)	207 lb (94 kg)	October 19, 1970 (aged 27)	(Finland) Jokerit
16	F	Ville Peltonen	5 ft 11 in (180 cm)	187 lb (85 kg)	May 24, 1973 (aged 24)	(Sweden) Västra Frölunda HC
17	F	Jari Kurri (A)	6 ft 0 in (183 cm)	198 lb (90 kg)	May 18, 1960 (aged 37)	(United States) Colorado Avalanche
19	F	Juha Lind	5 ft 11 in (180 cm)	185 lb (84 kg)	January 2, 1974 (aged 24)	(United States) Dallas Stars
21	D	Jyrki Lumme	6 ft 1 in (185 cm)	214 lb (97 kg)	July 16, 1966 (aged 31)	(Canada) Vancouver Canucks
24	F	Sami Kapanen	5 ft 10 in (178 cm)	181 lb (82 kg)	June 14, 1973 (aged 24)	(United States) Carolina Hurricanes
25	F	Kimmo Rintanen	5 ft 11 in (180 cm)	190 lb (86 kg)	August 7, 1973 (aged 24)	(Finland) TPS
26	F	Jere Lehtinen	6 ft 0 in (183 cm)	194 lb (88 kg)	June 24, 1973 (aged 24)	(United States) Dallas Stars
27	D	Teppo Numminen (A)	6 ft 1 in (185 cm)	198 lb (90 kg)	July 3, 1968 (aged 29)	(United States) Phoenix Coyotes
30	G	Jukka Tammi	5 ft 11 in (180 cm)	172 lb (78 kg)	April 10, 1962 (aged 35)	(Germany) Frankfurt Lions
31	G	Ari Sulander	6 ft 2 in (188 cm)	220 lb (100 kg)	January 6, 1969 (aged 29)	(Finland) Jokerit
35	G	Jarmo Myllys	5 ft 9 in (175 cm)	172 lb (78 kg)	May 29, 1965 (aged 32)	(Sweden) Luleå HF
37	F	Juha Ylönen	6 ft 1 in (185 cm)	185 lb (84 kg)	February 13, 1972 (aged 25)	(United States) Phoenix Coyotes
40	F	Mika Nieminen	6 ft 1 in (185 cm)	203 lb (92 kg)	January 1, 1966 (aged 32)	(Finland) Jokerit
44	D	Janne Niinimaa	6 ft 1 in (185 cm)	220 lb (100 kg)	May 22, 1975 (aged 22)	(United States) Philadelphia Flyers

== France ==
Head coach: (United States) Herb Brooks

Assistant coach: (United States) James Tibbetts

No.	Pos.	Name	Height	Weight	Birthdate	Team
1	G	Cristobal Huet	6 ft 0 in (183 cm)	205 lb (93 kg)	September 3, 1975 (aged 22)	(France) Brûleurs de Loups
2	D	Serge Djelloul	6 ft 1 in (185 cm)	203 lb (92 kg)	March 28, 1966 (aged 31)	(Austria) EC Graz
7	F/D	Stéphane Barin	5 ft 10 in (178 cm)	172 lb (78 kg)	January 8, 1971 (aged 27)	(France) Brûleurs de Loups
8	F	Arnaud Briand	6 ft 1 in (185 cm)	198 lb (90 kg)	April 29, 1970 (aged 27)	(France) Reims
9	F	Maurice Rozenthal	5 ft 10 in (178 cm)	174 lb (79 kg)	June 20, 1975 (aged 22)	(France) Gothiques d'Amiens
12	F	Philippe Bozon	5 ft 11 in (180 cm)	192 lb (87 kg)	November 30, 1966 (aged 31)	(Germany) Adler Mannheim
13	D	Karl DeWolf	5 ft 11 in (180 cm)	170 lb (77 kg)	February 21, 1972 (aged 25)	(France) Gothiques d'Amiens
14	F	François Rozenthal	5 ft 10 in (178 cm)	170 lb (77 kg)	June 20, 1975 (aged 22)	(France) Gothiques d'Amiens
15	F	Pierre Allard	5 ft 11 in (180 cm)	187 lb (85 kg)	August 19, 1972 (aged 25)	(France) Brûleurs de Loups
16	D	Jean-Philippe Lemoine (C)	6 ft 4 in (193 cm)	229 lb (104 kg)	September 11, 1964 (aged 33)	(Germany) Frankfurt Lions
19	F	Robert Ouellet	5 ft 10 in (178 cm)	176 lb (80 kg)	March 18, 1968 (aged 29)	(France) Brûleurs de Loups
22	F	Anthony Mortas	6 ft 0 in (183 cm)	190 lb (86 kg)	February 13, 1974 (aged 23)	(France) Reims
24	D	Denis Perez	6 ft 2 in (188 cm)	203 lb (92 kg)	April 25, 1964 (aged 33)	(France) Rouen
26	D/F	Christian Pouget	5 ft 11 in (180 cm)	181 lb (82 kg)	January 11, 1966 (aged 32)	(Germany) Adler Mannheim
27	D	Serge Poudrier	5 ft 11 in (180 cm)	183 lb (83 kg)	April 22, 1966 (aged 31)	(Germany) Hannover Scorpions
28	F	Roger Dubé	5 ft 10 in (178 cm)	196 lb (89 kg)	October 2, 1965 (aged 32)	(Germany) Kassel Huskies
29	G	François Gravel	6 ft 4 in (193 cm)	194 lb (88 kg)	October 21, 1968 (aged 29)	(Germany) Hannover Scorpions
33	G	Fabrice Lhenry	5 ft 11 in (180 cm)	181 lb (82 kg)	June 29, 1972 (aged 25)	(Germany) Frankfurt Lions
34	D	Jean-Christophe Filippin	6 ft 5 in (196 cm)	231 lb (105 kg)	May 18, 1969 (aged 28)	(France) Reims
36	F	Richard Aimonetto	6 ft 0 in (183 cm)	190 lb (86 kg)	January 24, 1973 (aged 25)	(France) Chamonix
40	F	Laurent Gras	5 ft 10 in (178 cm)	185 lb (84 kg)	March 15, 1976 (aged 21)	(France) Chamonix
42	F	Jonathan Zwikel	6 ft 0 in (183 cm)	192 lb (87 kg)	July 16, 1975 (aged 22)	(France) Reims
43	D	Grégory Dubois	5 ft 9 in (175 cm)	168 lb (76 kg)	March 27, 1975 (aged 22)	(France) Gothiques d'Amiens

== Germany ==
Head coach: (Canada) George Kingston

No.	Pos.	Name	Height	Weight	Birthdate	Team
1	G	Olaf Kölzig	6 ft 3 in (191 cm)	225 lb (102 kg)	April 6, 1970 (aged 27)	(United States) Washington Capitals
7	F	Thomas Brandl	5 ft 9 in (175 cm)	165 lb (75 kg)	February 9, 1969 (aged 28)	(Germany) Düsseldorfer EG
10	F	Reemt Pyka	6 ft 1 in (185 cm)	196 lb (89 kg)	January 11, 1969 (aged 29)	(Germany) Krefeld Pinguine
12	D	Mirko Lüdemann	5 ft 11 in (180 cm)	192 lb (87 kg)	December 15, 1973 (aged 24)	(Germany) Kölner Haie
15	D	Jochen Molling	6 ft 1 in (185 cm)	220 lb (100 kg)	August 9, 1973 (aged 24)	(Germany) Berlin Capitals
16	F	Benoit Doucet	5 ft 9 in (175 cm)	183 lb (83 kg)	April 23, 1963 (aged 34)	(Germany) Düsseldorfer EG
17	F	Peter Draisaitl	6 ft 0 in (183 cm)	190 lb (86 kg)	December 7, 1965 (aged 32)	(Germany) Kölner Haie
20	F	Jürgen Rumrich	5 ft 11 in (180 cm)	187 lb (85 kg)	March 20, 1968 (aged 29)	(Germany) Berlin Capitals
22	F	Andreas Lupzig	6 ft 2 in (188 cm)	198 lb (90 kg)	August 5, 1968 (aged 29)	(Germany) Kölner Haie
23	F	Dieter Hegen (C)	6 ft 0 in (183 cm)	198 lb (90 kg)	April 29, 1962 (aged 35)	(Germany) Düsseldorfer EG
27	G	Klaus Merk	5 ft 11 in (180 cm)	185 lb (84 kg)	April 26, 1967 (aged 30)	(Germany) Berlin Capitals
29	F	Jochen Hecht	6 ft 1 in (185 cm)	192 lb (87 kg)	June 21, 1977 (aged 20)	(Germany) Adler Mannheim
30	G	Josef Heiß	5 ft 11 in (180 cm)	187 lb (85 kg)	June 13, 1963 (aged 34)	(Germany) Kölner Haie
32	D	Lars Brüggemann	6 ft 4 in (193 cm)	229 lb (104 kg)	March 2, 1976 (aged 21)	(United States) Jacksonville Lizard Kings
33	D	Markus Wieland	6 ft 3 in (191 cm)	183 lb (83 kg)	March 26, 1976 (aged 21)	(Germany) EV Landshut
36	D	Erich Goldmann	6 ft 3 in (191 cm)	221 lb (100 kg)	April 7, 1976 (aged 21)	(United States) Worcester IceCats
39	F	Marco Sturm	5 ft 11 in (180 cm)	194 lb (88 kg)	September 8, 1978 (aged 19)	(United States) San Jose Sharks
41	D	Daniel Kunce	6 ft 1 in (185 cm)	205 lb (93 kg)	July 17, 1971 (aged 26)	(Germany) Nürnberg Ice Tigers
44	D	Uwe Krupp	6 ft 6 in (198 cm)	238 lb (108 kg)	June 24, 1965 (aged 32)	(United States) Colorado Avalanche
47	D	Brad Bergen	5 ft 11 in (180 cm)	176 lb (80 kg)	March 16, 1966 (aged 31)	(Germany) Düsseldorfer EG
71	F	Stefan Ustorf	5 ft 11 in (180 cm)	194 lb (88 kg)	January 3, 1974 (aged 24)	(Germany) Berlin Capitals
81	F	Mark MacKay	5 ft 8 in (173 cm)	181 lb (82 kg)	May 28, 1964 (aged 33)	(Germany) SERC Wild Wings
83	F/D	Jan Benda	6 ft 2 in (188 cm)	218 lb (99 kg)	April 28, 1972 (aged 25)	(United States) Portland Pirates

== Italy ==
Head coach: Adolf Insam

No.	Pos.	Name	Height	Weight	Birthdate	Team
1	G	Mario Brunetta	6 ft 4 in (193 cm)	187 lb (85 kg)	January 25, 1967 (aged 31)	(Germany) Eisbären Berlin
4	D	Robert Oberrauch (C)	6 ft 2 in (188 cm)	207 lb (94 kg)	November 6, 1965 (aged 32)	(Italy) HC Bolzano
5	F	Leo Insam	6 ft 5 in (196 cm)	212 lb (96 kg)	February 6, 1975 (aged 23)	(Germany) Düsseldorfer EG
7	D	Bob Nardella	5 ft 8 in (173 cm)	170 lb (77 kg)	February 2, 1968 (aged 30)	(United States) Chicago Wolves
9	F	Dino Felicetti	5 ft 10 in (178 cm)	203 lb (92 kg)	December 22, 1970 (aged 27)	(Italy) Fassa
11	F	Roland Ramoser	6 ft 3 in (191 cm)	205 lb (93 kg)	September 3, 1972 (aged 25)	(Germany) Kassel Huskies
12	F	Maurizio Mansi	5 ft 10 in (178 cm)	185 lb (84 kg)	September 3, 1965 (aged 32)	(Austria) EC VSV
16	F	Bruno Zarrillo	5 ft 11 in (180 cm)	170 lb (77 kg)	September 5, 1966 (aged 31)	(Germany) Kölner Haie
17	F	Gaetano Orlando	5 ft 10 in (178 cm)	183 lb (83 kg)	November 13, 1962 (aged 35)	(Switzerland) SC Bern
19	F	Patrick Brugnoli	5 ft 9 in (175 cm)	176 lb (80 kg)	April 12, 1970 (aged 27)	(Italy) Gherdëina
21	F	Giuseppe Busillo	6 ft 5 in (196 cm)	212 lb (96 kg)	May 13, 1970 (aged 27)	(Germany) Kölner Haie
22	F	Stefano Margoni	6 ft 0 in (183 cm)	181 lb (82 kg)	May 12, 1975 (aged 22)	(Italy) Fassa
24	F	Mario Chitaroni	5 ft 7 in (170 cm)	176 lb (80 kg)	June 11, 1967 (aged 30)	(Germany) Eisbären Berlin
25	D	Chad Biafore	6 ft 0 in (183 cm)	181 lb (82 kg)	May 28, 1968 (aged 29)	(Germany) Eisbären Berlin
26	D	Larry Rucchin	6 ft 0 in (183 cm)	205 lb (93 kg)	May 12, 1967 (aged 30)	(Germany) Düsseldorfer EG
27	F	Lucio Topatigh	6 ft 1 in (185 cm)	203 lb (92 kg)	October 19, 1965 (aged 32)	(Italy) HC Bolzano
28	F	Martin Pavlu	6 ft 2 in (188 cm)	187 lb (85 kg)	July 8, 1962 (aged 35)	(Italy) HC Bolzano
29	D	Chris Bartolone	5 ft 11 in (180 cm)	190 lb (86 kg)	February 24, 1970 (aged 27)	(Germany) Krefeld Pinguine
33	G	David Delfino	5 ft 8 in (173 cm)	174 lb (79 kg)	December 29, 1965 (aged 32)	(Germany) Kölner Haie
34	G	Mike Rosati	5 ft 9 in (175 cm)	172 lb (78 kg)	January 7, 1968 (aged 30)	(Germany) Adler Mannheim
37	D	Mike DeAngelis	5 ft 11 in (180 cm)	190 lb (86 kg)	January 27, 1966 (aged 32)	(United States) Reno Rage
77	F	Markus Brunner	6 ft 1 in (185 cm)	194 lb (88 kg)	May 18, 1973 (aged 24)	(Italy) Merano
91	F	Stefano Figliuzzi	5 ft 11 in (180 cm)	196 lb (89 kg)	July 23, 1968 (aged 29)	(Switzerland) ZSC Lions

== Japan ==
Head coach: (Sweden) Björn Kinding

Assistant coach: Toru Itabashi

No.	Pos.	Name	Height	Weight	Birthdate	Team
1	G	Shinichi Iwasaki	5 ft 10 in (178 cm)	187 lb (85 kg)	August 21, 1968 (aged 29)	(Japan) Kokudo
2	D	Hiroyuki Miura	6 ft 3 in (191 cm)	192 lb (87 kg)	December 31, 1973 (aged 24)	(Japan) Kokudo
3	D	Atsuo Kudo	5 ft 10 in (178 cm)	172 lb (78 kg)	January 9, 1965 (aged 33)	(Japan) Kokudo
6	D	Takeshi Yamanaka	5 ft 10 in (178 cm)	183 lb (83 kg)	January 30, 1971 (aged 27)	(Japan) Oji Seishi
7	D	Takayuki Kobori	6 ft 1 in (185 cm)	216 lb (98 kg)	April 20, 1969 (aged 28)	(Japan) Seibu Bears Tokyo
8	D	Tatsuki Katayama	6 ft 1 in (185 cm)	190 lb (86 kg)	January 26, 1973 (aged 25)	(Japan) Kokudo
11	D	Yutaka Kawaguchi	5 ft 9 in (175 cm)	172 lb (78 kg)	April 5, 1973 (aged 24)	(Japan) Kokudo
12	F	Steve Tsujiura	5 ft 5 in (165 cm)	163 lb (74 kg)	February 28, 1962 (aged 35)	(Japan) Kokudo
13	F	Akihito Sugisawa	5 ft 7 in (170 cm)	141 lb (64 kg)	July 20, 1967 (aged 30)	(Japan) Oji Seishi
15	F	Tsutsumi Otomo	5 ft 11 in (180 cm)	176 lb (80 kg)	October 15, 1975 (aged 22)	(Japan) Kokudo
16	F	Toshiyuki Sakai (C)	6 ft 0 in (183 cm)	187 lb (85 kg)	October 3, 1964 (aged 33)	(Japan) Kokudo
22	F	Makoto Kawahira	5 ft 10 in (178 cm)	185 lb (84 kg)	August 25, 1971 (aged 26)	(Japan) Oji Seishi
23	F	Yuji Iga	5 ft 11 in (180 cm)	176 lb (80 kg)	July 18, 1965 (aged 32)	(Japan) Kokudo
24	F	Kunihiko Sakurai	6 ft 0 in (183 cm)	170 lb (77 kg)	April 11, 1972 (aged 25)	(Japan) Oji Seishi
27	G	Jiro Nihei	5 ft 8 in (173 cm)	165 lb (75 kg)	March 9, 1971 (aged 26)	(Japan) Kokudo
30	F	Shin Yahata	5 ft 9 in (175 cm)	174 lb (79 kg)	May 9, 1974 (aged 23)	(Japan) Kokudo
31	F	Hiroshi Matsuura	6 ft 0 in (183 cm)	154 lb (70 kg)	May 14, 1968 (aged 29)	(Japan) Oji Seishi
36	D	Takayuki Miura	6 ft 0 in (183 cm)	191 lb (87 kg)	March 25, 1967 (aged 30)	(Japan) Seibu Bears Tokyo
40	F	Ryan Fujita	5 ft 7 in (170 cm)	163 lb (74 kg)	June 25, 1972 (aged 25)	(Japan) Seibu Bears Tokyo
47	F	Matt Kabayama	5 ft 6 in (168 cm)	172 lb (78 kg)	November 18, 1965 (aged 32)	(Japan) Seibu Bears Tokyo
70	G	Dusty Imoo	5 ft 8 in (173 cm)	150 lb (68 kg)	July 18, 1970 (aged 27)	(Japan) Seibu Bears Tokyo
71	F	Ryan Kuwabara	6 ft 0 in (183 cm)	209 lb (95 kg)	March 23, 1972 (aged 25)	(Japan) Kokudo
75	F	Chris Yule	5 ft 9 in (175 cm)	150 lb (68 kg)	March 29, 1975 (aged 22)	(Japan) Kokudo

== Kazakhstan ==
Head coach: Boris Alexandrov

No.	Pos.	Name	Height	Weight	Birthdate	Team
1	G	Alexander Shimin	6 ft 1 in (185 cm)	198 lb (90 kg)	January 2, 1970 (aged 28)	(Kazakhstan) Torpedo Ust-Kamenogrosk
3	D	Igor Zemlyanoy	5 ft 9 in (175 cm)	174 lb (79 kg)	May 26, 1967 (aged 30)	(Russia) Metallurg Magnitogorsk
4	D	Vitali Tregubov	6 ft 0 in (183 cm)	190 lb (86 kg)	January 28, 1974 (aged 24)	(Russia) Severstal Cherepovets
5	D	Alexei Troshchinsky	6 ft 0 in (183 cm)	205 lb (93 kg)	October 9, 1973 (aged 24)	(Russia) Dynamo Moskva
7	D	Igor Nikitin	6 ft 2 in (188 cm)	198 lb (90 kg)	March 23, 1973 (aged 24)	(Russia) Avangard Omsk
8	D	Andrei Sokolov	6 ft 0 in (183 cm)	176 lb (80 kg)	January 22, 1968 (aged 30)	(Russia) Metallurg Magnitogorsk
9	D	Vladimir Antipin	6 ft 2 in (188 cm)	203 lb (92 kg)	April 18, 1970 (aged 27)	(Russia) Metallurg Magnitogorsk
10	F	Oleg Kryazhev	5 ft 8 in (173 cm)	194 lb (88 kg)	October 9, 1970 (aged 27)	(Russia) Avangard Omsk
11	F	Pavel Kamentsev	6 ft 0 in (183 cm)	181 lb (82 kg)	August 15, 1969 (aged 28)	(Russia) Avangard Omsk
15	F	Igor Dorokhin	5 ft 11 in (180 cm)	185 lb (84 kg)	August 15, 1962 (aged 35)	(Germany) Heilbronner EC
17	F	Alexander Koreshkov	5 ft 11 in (180 cm)	205 lb (93 kg)	October 28, 1968 (aged 29)	(Russia) Metallurg Magnitogorsk
18	F	Dmitri Dudarev	6 ft 2 in (188 cm)	209 lb (95 kg)	February 23, 1976 (aged 21)	(Russia) Severstal Cherepovets
19	F	Yevgeni Koreshkov	5 ft 7 in (170 cm)	181 lb (82 kg)	March 11, 1970 (aged 27)	(Russia) Metallurg Magnitogorsk
21	F	Andrei Pchelyakov	5 ft 10 in (178 cm)	176 lb (80 kg)	February 19, 1972 (aged 25)	(Russia) Severstal Cherepovets
23	F	Vladimir Zavyalov	6 ft 3 in (191 cm)	185 lb (84 kg)	May 1, 1974 (aged 23)	(Russia) Severstal Cherepovets
24	F	Pyotr Devyatkin	5 ft 9 in (175 cm)	198 lb (90 kg)	March 8, 1977 (aged 20)	(Kazakhstan) Torpedo Ust-Kamenogrosk
25	F	Yerlan Sagymbayev (C)	6 ft 1 in (185 cm)	176 lb (80 kg)	April 5, 1970 (aged 27)	(Russia) Sibir Novosibirsk
26	D	Andrei Savenkov	6 ft 0 in (183 cm)	194 lb (88 kg)	March 7, 1975 (aged 22)	(Russia) Sibir Novosibirsk
27	F	Mikhail Borodulin	6 ft 2 in (188 cm)	192 lb (87 kg)	July 8, 1968 (aged 29)	(Russia) Metallurg Magnitogorsk
28	D	Vadim Glovatsky	6 ft 4 in (193 cm)	198 lb (90 kg)	January 1, 1970 (aged 28)	(Russia) Metallurg Magnitogorsk
29	F	Konstantin Shafranov	6 ft 0 in (183 cm)	198 lb (90 kg)	September 11, 1968 (aged 29)	(United States) Fort Wayne Komets
30	G	Vitali Yeremeyev	6 ft 0 in (183 cm)	203 lb (92 kg)	September 23, 1975 (aged 22)	(Russia) Torpedo Yaroslavl

== Russia ==
Head coach: Vladimir Yurzinov

Assistant coaches: Zinetula Bilyaletdinov, Pyotr Vorobyov

No.	Pos.	Name	Height	Weight	Birthdate	Team
2	D	Boris Mironov	6 ft 3 in (191 cm)	212 lb (96 kg)	March 21, 1972 (aged 25)	(Canada) Edmonton Oilers
3	D	Dmitri Yushkevich	5 ft 11 in (180 cm)	207 lb (94 kg)	November 19, 1971 (aged 26)	(Canada) Toronto Maple Leafs
5	D	Alexei Gusarov	6 ft 1 in (185 cm)	198 lb (90 kg)	July 8, 1964 (aged 33)	(United States) Colorado Avalanche
8	F	Valeri Bure	5 ft 11 in (180 cm)	181 lb (82 kg)	June 13, 1974 (aged 23)	(Canada) Calgary Flames
8	F	Sergei Nemchinov	5 ft 11 in (180 cm)	198 lb (90 kg)	January 14, 1964 (aged 34)	(United States) New York Islanders
9	F	Sergei Krivokrasov	5 ft 10 in (178 cm)	194 lb (88 kg)	April 15, 1974 (aged 23)	(United States) Chicago Blackhawks
10	F	Pavel Bure (C)	5 ft 10 in (178 cm)	187 lb (85 kg)	March 31, 1971 (aged 26)	(Canada) Vancouver Canucks
11	D	Darius Kasparaitis	5 ft 10 in (178 cm)	207 lb (94 kg)	October 16, 1972 (aged 25)	(United States) Pittsburgh Penguins
13	F	Valeri Kamensky	6 ft 1 in (185 cm)	196 lb (89 kg)	April 18, 1966 (aged 31)	(United States) Colorado Avalanche
14	F	German Titov	6 ft 0 in (183 cm)	190 lb (86 kg)	October 16, 1965 (aged 32)	(Canada) Calgary Flames
15	D	Dmitri Mironov	6 ft 3 in (191 cm)	214 lb (97 kg)	December 25, 1965 (aged 32)	(United States) Mighty Ducks of Anaheim
19	F	Alexei Yashin	6 ft 4 in (193 cm)	227 lb (103 kg)	November 5, 1973 (aged 24)	(Canada) Ottawa Senators
21	F	Valeri Zelepukin	6 ft 0 in (183 cm)	207 lb (94 kg)	September 17, 1968 (aged 29)	(Canada) Edmonton Oilers
29	D	Igor Kravchuk	6 ft 1 in (185 cm)	205 lb (93 kg)	September 13, 1966 (aged 31)	(Canada) Ottawa Senators
31	G	Oleg Shevtsov	6 ft 2 in (188 cm)	214 lb (97 kg)	November 29, 1971 (aged 26)	(Russia) Severstal Cherepovets
33	F	Alexei Zhamnov	6 ft 0 in (183 cm)	194 lb (88 kg)	October 1, 1970 (aged 27)	(United States) Chicago Blackhawks
34	G	Andrei Trefilov	6 ft 0 in (183 cm)	181 lb (82 kg)	August 31, 1969 (aged 28)	(United States) Chicago Blackhawks
35	G	Mikhail Shtalenkov	6 ft 1 in (185 cm)	183 lb (83 kg)	October 20, 1965 (aged 32)	(United States) Mighty Ducks of Anaheim
44	D	Alexei Zhitnik	5 ft 10 in (178 cm)	203 lb (92 kg)	October 10, 1972 (aged 25)	(United States) Buffalo Sabres
51	F	Andrei Kovalenko	6 ft 0 in (183 cm)	227 lb (103 kg)	June 7, 1970 (aged 27)	(Canada) Edmonton Oilers
55	D	Sergei Gonchar	6 ft 2 in (188 cm)	209 lb (95 kg)	April 13, 1974 (aged 23)	(United States) Washington Capitals
91	F	Sergei Fedorov	6 ft 1 in (185 cm)	205 lb (93 kg)	December 13, 1969 (aged 28)	(United States) Detroit Red Wings
95	F	Alexei Morozov	6 ft 2 in (188 cm)	205 lb (93 kg)	February 16, 1977 (aged 20)	(United States) Pittsburgh Penguins

== Slovakia ==
Head coach: Jan Sterbak

No.	Pos.	Name	Height	Weight	Birthdate	Team
1	G	Igor Murín	5 ft 11 in (180 cm)	192 lb (87 kg)	March 1, 1973 (aged 24)	(Slovakia) HK Dukla Trenčín
2	G	Pavol Rybár	5 ft 11 in (180 cm)	190 lb (86 kg)	October 12, 1971 (aged 26)	(Slovakia) HK 36 Skalika
5	D	Miroslav Mosnár	5 ft 11 in (180 cm)	205 lb (93 kg)	August 10, 1968 (aged 29)	(Slovakia) HC Slovan Bratislava
6	D	Ľubomír Višňovský	5 ft 10 in (178 cm)	192 lb (87 kg)	August 11, 1976 (aged 21)	(Slovakia) HC Slovan Bratislava
7	D	Ľubomír Sekeráš	6 ft 0 in (183 cm)	176 lb (80 kg)	November 18, 1968 (aged 29)	(Czech Republic) HC Třinec
8	D	Stanislav Jasečko	6 ft 4 in (193 cm)	209 lb (95 kg)	December 5, 1972 (aged 25)	(Slovakia) HC Košice
9	F	Vlastimil Plavucha	6 ft 0 in (183 cm)	181 lb (82 kg)	November 6, 1968 (aged 29)	(Slovakia) HC Košice
10	F	Oto Haščák	6 ft 1 in (185 cm)	198 lb (90 kg)	January 31, 1964 (aged 34)	(Finland) Ässät
12	F	Peter Bondra	6 ft 1 in (185 cm)	201 lb (91 kg)	February 7, 1968 (aged 30)	(United States) Washington Capitals
13	F	Roman Stantien	6 ft 0 in (183 cm)	183 lb (83 kg)	October 16, 1964 (aged 33)	(Czech Republic) HC Vestín
15	F	Peter Pucher	6 ft 1 in (185 cm)	231 lb (105 kg)	August 12, 1974 (aged 23)	(Slovakia) HC Košice
19	F	Robert Petrovický	5 ft 11 in (180 cm)	179 lb (81 kg)	October 26, 1973 (aged 24)	(United States) Worcester IceCats
20	F	Zdeno Ciger	6 ft 1 in (185 cm)	190 lb (86 kg)	October 19, 1969 (aged 28)	(Slovakia) HC Slovan Bratislava
21	F	Branislav Jánoš	5 ft 9 in (175 cm)	179 lb (81 kg)	January 8, 1971 (aged 27)	(Czech Republic) HC Zlín
22	F	Roman Kontšek	6 ft 0 in (183 cm)	209 lb (95 kg)	June 11, 1970 (aged 27)	(Czech Republic) HC Třinec
24	F	Ján Pardavý	6 ft 0 in (183 cm)	209 lb (95 kg)	September 8, 1971 (aged 26)	(Slovakia) HK Dukla Trenčin
27	D	Ján Varholík	6 ft 0 in (183 cm)	198 lb (90 kg)	February 28, 1970 (aged 27)	(Slovakia) HC Košice
28	F	Ľubomír Kolník	6 ft 1 in (185 cm)	194 lb (88 kg)	January 23, 1968 (aged 30)	(Slovakia) HC Slovan Bratislava
29	F	Jozef Daňo	6 ft 0 in (183 cm)	192 lb (87 kg)	December 28, 1968 (aged 29)	(Czech Republic) HC Třinec
30	G	Miroslav Šimonovič	6 ft 0 in (183 cm)	181 lb (82 kg)	August 10, 1974 (aged 23)	(Slovakia) HC Košice
33	D	Ivan Droppa	6 ft 3 in (191 cm)	216 lb (98 kg)	February 1, 1972 (aged 26)	(Slovakia) HC Košice
35	F	Karol Rusznyák	6 ft 0 in (183 cm)	205 lb (93 kg)	November 26, 1967 (aged 30)	(Slovakia) HC Slovan Bratislava
44	D	Róbert Švehla	6 ft 0 in (183 cm)	207 lb (94 kg)	January 2, 1969 (aged 29)	(United States) Florida Panthers

== Sweden ==
Head coach: Kent Forsberg

Assistant coach: (United States) Barry Smith

No.	Pos.	Name	Height	Weight	Birthdate	Team
1	G	Johan Hedberg	6 ft 0 in (183 cm)	190 lb (86 kg)	May 5, 1973 (aged 24)	(United States) Detroit Vipers
2	D	Mattias Öhlund	6 ft 4 in (193 cm)	234 lb (106 kg)	September 9, 1976 (aged 21)	(Canada) Vancouver Canucks
4	D	Nicklas Lidström	6 ft 1 in (185 cm)	190 lb (86 kg)	April 28, 1970 (aged 27)	(United States) Detroit Red Wings
5	D	Ulf Samuelsson	6 ft 1 in (185 cm)	203 lb (92 kg)	March 26, 1964 (aged 33)	(United States) New York Rangers
6	D	Calle Johansson (C)	5 ft 11 in (180 cm)	203 lb (92 kg)	February 14, 1967 (aged 30)	(United States) Washington Capitals
7	D	Tommy Albelin	6 ft 1 in (185 cm)	194 lb (88 kg)	May 21, 1964 (aged 33)	(Canada) Calgary Flames
10	D	Marcus Ragnarsson	6 ft 1 in (185 cm)	216 lb (98 kg)	August 13, 1971 (aged 26)	(United States) San Jose Sharks
11	F	Daniel Alfredsson	6 ft 0 in (183 cm)	203 lb (92 kg)	December 11, 1972 (aged 25)	(Canada) Ottawa Senators
13	F	Mats Sundin	6 ft 5 in (196 cm)	231 lb (105 kg)	February 13, 1971 (aged 26)	(Canada) Toronto Maple Leafs
14	D	Mattias Norström	6 ft 1 in (185 cm)	223 lb (101 kg)	January 2, 1972 (aged 26)	(United States) Los Angeles Kings
17	F	Tomas Sandström	6 ft 2 in (188 cm)	209 lb (95 kg)	September 4, 1964 (aged 33)	(United States) Mighty Ducks of Anaheim
19	F	Mikael Renberg	6 ft 2 in (188 cm)	236 lb (107 kg)	May 5, 1972 (aged 25)	(United States) Tampa Bay Lightning
21	F	Peter Forsberg	6 ft 1 in (185 cm)	205 lb (93 kg)	July 20, 1973 (aged 24)	(United States) Colorado Avalanche
22	F	Ulf Dahlén	6 ft 2 in (188 cm)	198 lb (90 kg)	January 21, 1967 (aged 31)	(Sweden) HV71
24	F	Patric Kjellberg	6 ft 2 in (188 cm)	212 lb (96 kg)	June 17, 1969 (aged 28)	(Sweden) Djurgårdens IF
30	G	Tommy Söderström	5 ft 9 in (175 cm)	165 lb (75 kg)	July 17, 1969 (aged 28)	(Sweden) Djurgårdens IF
34	F	Mikael Andersson	5 ft 10 in (178 cm)	181 lb (82 kg)	May 10, 1966 (aged 31)	(United States) Tampa Bay Lightning
35	G	Tommy Salo	6 ft 0 in (183 cm)	179 lb (81 kg)	February 1, 1971 (aged 27)	(United States) New York Islanders
37	F	Niklas Sundström	6 ft 0 in (183 cm)	194 lb (88 kg)	June 6, 1975 (aged 22)	(United States) New York Rangers
38	F	Andreas Johansson	6 ft 0 in (183 cm)	205 lb (93 kg)	May 19, 1973 (aged 24)	(United States) Pittsburgh Penguins
41	F	Mats Lindgren	6 ft 2 in (188 cm)	201 lb (91 kg)	October 1, 1974 (aged 23)	(Canada) Edmonton Oilers
72	F	Jörgen Jönsson	6 ft 0 in (183 cm)	192 lb (87 kg)	September 29, 1972 (aged 25)	(Sweden) Färjestad BK
92	F	Michael Nylander	5 ft 11 in (180 cm)	192 lb (87 kg)	October 3, 1972 (aged 25)	(Canada) Calgary Flames

== United States ==
The following is the United States roster for the men's ice hockey tournament at the 1998 Winter Olympics.

Head coach: Ron Wilson

Assistant coaches: John Cunniff, Paul Holmgren, Jeff Jackson

No.	Pos.	Name	Height	Weight	Birthdate	Team
2	D	Brian Leetch (A)	6 ft 1 in (185 cm)	187 lb (85 kg)	March 3, 1968 (aged 29)	(United States) New York Rangers
3	D	Derian Hatcher	6 ft 5 in (196 cm)	245 lb (111 kg)	June 4, 1972 (aged 25)	(United States) Dallas Stars
4	D	Kevin Hatcher	6 ft 3 in (191 cm)	231 lb (105 kg)	September 9, 1966 (aged 31)	(United States) Pittsburgh Penguins
5	D	Mathieu Schneider	5 ft 11 in (180 cm)	192 lb (87 kg)	June 12, 1969 (aged 28)	(Canada) Toronto Maple Leafs
6	D	Bryan Berard	6 ft 2 in (188 cm)	220 lb (100 kg)	March 5, 1977 (aged 20)	(United States) New York Islanders
7	D	Chris Chelios (C)	5 ft 11 in (180 cm)	191 lb (87 kg)	January 25, 1962 (aged 36)	(United States) Chicago Blackhawks
9	F	Mike Modano	6 ft 3 in (191 cm)	210 lb (95 kg)	June 7, 1970 (aged 27)	(United States) Dallas Stars
10	F	John LeClair	6 ft 3 in (191 cm)	225 lb (102 kg)	July 5, 1969 (aged 28)	(United States) Philadelphia Flyers
11	F	Tony Amonte	6 ft 0 in (183 cm)	202 lb (92 kg)	August 2, 1970 (aged 27)	(United States) Chicago Blackhawks
12	F	Bill Guerin	6 ft 2 in (188 cm)	220 lb (100 kg)	November 9, 1970 (aged 27)	(Canada) Edmonton Oilers
15	F	Brett Hull	5 ft 11 in (180 cm)	201 lb (91 kg)	August 9, 1964 (aged 33)	(United States) St. Louis Blues
16	F	Pat LaFontaine	5 ft 10 in (178 cm)	181 lb (82 kg)	February 22, 1965 (aged 32)	(United States) New York Rangers
17	F	Keith Tkachuk (A)	6 ft 2 in (188 cm)	235 lb (107 kg)	March 28, 1972 (aged 25)	(United States) Phoenix Coyotes
18	F	Adam Deadmarsh	6 ft 0 in (183 cm)	205 lb (93 kg)	May 10, 1975 (aged 22)	(United States) Colorado Avalanche
19	F	Doug Weight	5 ft 11 in (180 cm)	196 lb (89 kg)	January 21, 1971 (aged 27)	(Canada) Edmonton Oilers
20	D	Gary Suter	6 ft 0 in (183 cm)	205 lb (93 kg)	June 24, 1964 (aged 33)	(United States) Chicago Blackhawks
24	D	Keith Carney	6 ft 1 in (185 cm)	207 lb (94 kg)	February 3, 1970 (aged 28)	(United States) Chicago Blackhawks
25	F	Jamie Langenbrunner	6 ft 1 in (185 cm)	202 lb (92 kg)	July 24, 1975 (aged 22)	(United States) Dallas Stars
27	F	Jeremy Roenick	6 ft 1 in (185 cm)	205 lb (93 kg)	January 17, 1970 (aged 28)	(United States) Phoenix Coyotes
29	F	Joel Otto	6 ft 5 in (196 cm)	220 lb (100 kg)	October 29, 1961 (aged 36)	(United States) Philadelphia Flyers
31	G	Guy Hebert	5 ft 11 in (180 cm)	185 lb (84 kg)	January 7, 1967 (aged 31)	(United States) Mighty Ducks of Anaheim
34	G	John Vanbiesbrouck	5 ft 8 in (173 cm)	176 lb (80 kg)	September 4, 1963 (aged 34)	(United States) Florida Panthers
35	G	Mike Richter	5 ft 11 in (180 cm)	185 lb (84 kg)	September 22, 1966 (aged 31)	(United States) New York Rangers

== Sources ==
- Duplacey, James (1998). Total Hockey: The official encyclopedia of the National Hockey League. Total Sports. ISBN 0-8362-7114-9.
- Podnieks, Andrew (2010). IIHF Media Guide & Record Book 2011. Moydart Pres.
- Hockey Hall Of Fame page on the 1998 Olympics
