= 2000 IIHF World Championship rosters =

Rosters at the 2000 IIHF World Championship in Russia.

== Rosters ==
=== Czech Republic ===
(Czech Republic)
Goaltenders: Roman Čechmánek, Dušan Salfický, Vladimír Hudáček.
Defencemen: Petr Buzek, František Kučera, Michal Sýkora, Martin Štěpánek, Ladislav Benýšek, František Kaberle, Radek Martínek.
Forwards: Jiří Dopita, Robert Reichel, Jan Tomajko, David Výborný, Tomáš Vlasák, Václav Prospal, Pavel Patera, Martin Procházka, Martin Havlát, Václav Varaďa, Michal Broš, Petr Čajánek, Martin Špaňhel.
Coaches: Josef Augusta, Vladimír Martinec.

=== Slovakia ===
(Slovakia)
Goaltenders: Pavol Rybár, Ján Lašák, Miroslav Lipovský.
Defencemen: Ľubomír Sekeráš, Ivan Droppa, Stanislav Jasečko, Zdeno Chára, Peter Podhradský, Ľubomír Višňovský, Martin Štrbák, Radoslav Suchý.
Forwards: Miroslav Šatan, Ľubomír Hurtaj, Richard Kapuš, Peter Bartoš, Vlastimil Plavucha, Miroslav Hlinka, Ján Pardavý, Peter Pucher, Michal Hreus, Ľubomír Vaic, Ronald Petrovický, Ľuboš Bartečko, Michal Handzuš.
Coach: Ján Filc.

=== Finland ===
(Finland)
Goaltenders: Pasi Nurminen, Ari Sulander, Vesa Toskala.
Defencemen: Aki Berg, Jere Karalahti, Jyrki Lumme, Toni Lydman, Antti-Jussi Niemi, Janne Niinimaa, Petteri Nummelin.
Forwards: Antti Aalto, Raimo Helminen, Jukka Hentunen, Olli Jokinen, Tomi Kallio, Niko Kapanen, Juha Lind, Ville Peltonen, Kimmo Rintanen, Toni Sihvonen, Esa Tikkanen, Marko Tuomainen, Tony Virta.
Coach: Hannu Aravirta.

=== Canada ===
(Canada)
Goaltenders: José Théodore, Fred Brathwaite, Jamie Ram.
Defencemen: Patrick Traverse, Chris Phillips, Jeff Finley, Adrian Aucoin, Larry Murphy, Robyn Regehr, Yannick Tremblay, Ed Jovanovski.
Forwards: Peter Schaefer, Brendan Morrison, Mike Johnson, Trevor Letowski, Brad Isbister, Mike Sillinger, Dean McAmmond, Martin Lapointe, Jamal Mayers, Steve Sullivan, Kris Draper, Curtis Brown, Todd Bertuzzi, Ryan Smyth.
Coaches: Tom Renney, Butch Goring, Mike Pelino

=== United States ===
(United States)
Goaltenders: Robert Esche, Damian Rhodes, Karl Goehring.
Defencemen: Phil Housley, Eric Weinrich, Chris Luongo, Mike Mottau, Chris O'Sullivan, Ben Clymer, Hal Gill.
Forwards: Mike Peluso, Brian Gionta, Steve Konowalchuk, Chris Tancill, Steve Heinze, Jason Blake, Sean Haggerty, Jeff Halpern, Darby Hendrickson, Jeff Nielsen, Derek Plante, David Legwand, Eric Boguniecki.
Coaches: Lou Vairo.

=== Switzerland ===
(Switzerland)
Goaltenders: Martin Gerber, Reto Pavoni.
Defencemen: Patrick Sutter, Olivier Keller, Edgar Salis, Mark Streit, Julien Vauclair, Mathias Seger, Martin Steinegger, Rolf Ziegler.
Forwards: Gian-Marco Crameri, Patrick Fischer, Marcel Jenni, Thomas Ziegler, Ivo Rüthemann, Reto Von Arx, Flavien Conne, Alain Demuth, Michel Riesen, Patric Della Rossa, Claudio Micheli, Michel Zeiter, Jean-Jacques Aeschlimann.
Coaches: Ralph Krueger.

=== Sweden ===
(Sweden)
Goaltenders: Andreas Hadelöv, Mikael Tellqvist, Tommy Salo.
Defencemen: Peter Andersson, Ricard Persson, Rikard Franzén, Mattias Norström, Björn Nord, Mikael Magnusson, Daniel Tjärnqvist.
Forwards: Kristian Gahn, Per-Johan Axelsson, Daniel Sedin, Mikael Hakanson, Samuel Påhlsson, Peter Nordström, Henrik Sedin, Jörgen Jönsson, Kristian Huselius, Fredrik Lindquist, Jonas Rönnqvist, Fredrik Modin, Michael Nylander.
Coaches: Stephan Lundh, Hardy Nilsson.

=== Latvia ===
(Latvia)
Goaltenders: Artūrs Irbe, Sergejs Naumovs.
Defencemen: Kārlis Skrastiņš, Rodrigo Laviņš, Andrejs Maticins, Normunds Sējējs, Viktors Ignatjevs, Atvars Tribuncovs, Igors Bondarevs.
Forwards: Aleksandrs Beļavskis, Aleksandrs Ņiživijs, Aleksandrs Semjonovs, Juris Opuļskis, Aleksandrs Kercs, Leonids Tambijevs, Vjačeslavs Fanduļs, Grigorijs Panteļejevs, Harijs Vītoliņš, Janis Sprukts, Sergejs Seņins, Artis Ābols, Aigars Cipruss, Herberts Vasiļjevs.
Coaches: Haralds Vasiļjevs.

=== Belarus ===
(Belarus)
Goaltenders: Andrei Mezin, Leonid Fatikov.
Defencemen: Sergei Stas, Oleg Khmyl, Ruslan Salei, Oleg Romanov, Igor Matushkin, Yuri Krivokhiza, Alexander Makritski, Vladimir Kopat.
Forwards: Vladimir Tsyplakov, Andrei Kovalev, Alexei Kalyuzhny, Alexander Andrijevski, Andrei Skabelka, Viktor Karachun, Vasily Pankov, Vitali Valui, Dmitry Starostenko, Dmitry Pankov, Dmitri Dudik, Alexander Galchenyuk.
Coaches: Anatoli Varivonchik.

=== Norway ===
(Norway)
Goaltenders: Rob Schistad, Vidar Wold.
Defencemen: Mats Trygg, Tommy Jakobsen, Svein Enok Nørstebø, Johnny Nilsen, Ketil Wold, Martin Sellgren.
Forwards: Trond Magnussen, Per-Åge Skrøder, Tore Vikingstad, Martin Knold, Ole Eskild Dahlstrom, Marius Trygg, Morten Fjeld, Joakim Saether, Sjur Robert Nilsen, Pål Johnsen, Mads Hansen, Anders Fredriksen, Geir Svendsberget, Stig Vesterheim.
Coaches: Leif Boork.

=== Russia ===
(Russia)
Goaltenders: Ilja Bryzgalov, Yegor Podomatsky.
Defencemen: Maxim Galanov, Sergei Gonchar, Alexander Khavanov, Igor Kravchuk, Andrej Markov, Dmitri Mironov, Alexei Zhitnik.
Forwards: Maxim Afinogenov, Pavel Bure, Alexander Kharitonov, Alexei Yashin, Valeri Kamensky, Andrei Kovalenko, Viktor Kozlov, Alexei Kudashov, Andrei Nikolishin, Oleg Petrov, Alexander Prokopiev, Maxim Sushinski, Alexei Zhamnov.
Coaches: Alexander Yakushev, Zinetula Bilyaletdinov, Vladislav Tretyak.

=== Italy ===
(Italy)
Goaltenders: Andrea Carpano, Mike Rosati.
Defencemen: Carlo Lorenzi, Armin Helfer, Christopher Bartolone, Leo Insam, Georg Comploi, Ingemar Gruber, Michele Strazzabosco.
Forwards: Bruno Zarrillo, Mario Chitaroni, Dino Felicetti, Vezio Sacratini, Lucio Topatigh, Lino De Toni, Maurizio Mansi, Stefano Margoni, Manuel De Toni, Roland Ramoser, Stefan Zisser, Joe Busillo, Armando Chelodi.
Coaches: Adolf Insam.

=== Austria ===
(Austria)
Goaltenders: Reinhard Divis, Claus Dalpiaz, Michael Suttnig.
Defencemen: Tom Searle, Gerhard Unterluggauer, Martin Ulrich, Herbert Hohenberger, Dominic Lavoie, Andre Lakos, Peter Kasper.
Forwards: Christoph Brandner, Dieter Kalt, Simon Wheeldon, Matthias Trattnig, Martin Hohenberger, Artur Marczell, Christian Perthaler, Wolfgang Kromp, Günther Lanzinger, Mario Schaden, Gregor Baumgartner, Philipp Lukas, Gerald Ressmann.
Coaches: Ron Kennedy.

=== Ukraine ===
(Ukraine)
Goaltenders: Igor Karpenko, Yevgeni Brul, Vadim Selivertsov.
Defencemen: Olexander Savitsky, Dmitri Yakushin, Gennady Razin, Vyacheslav Zavalnyuk, Serhiy Klymentiev, Artem Ostroushko, Oleg Polkovnikov.
Forwards: Vitaliy Lytvynenko, Olexander Matviychuk, Serhiy Varlamov, Vadym Shakhraychuk, Borys Protsenko, Konstantin Kalmikov, Vasyl Bobrovnikov, Valentyn Oletsky, Bogdan Savenko, Ruslan Bezchasny, Andrei Voyush, Olexander Yakovenko, Olexei Lazarenko.
Coaches: Anatoliy Bogdanov.

=== France ===
(France)
Goaltenders: Cristobal Huet, Patrick Rolland, Fabrice Lhenry.
Defencemen: Denis Perez, Baptiste Amar, Karl Dewolf, Vincent Bachet, Gregory Dubois, Jean-Christophe Filippin, Jean-Marc Soghomonian.
Forwards: Arnaud Briand, Maurice Rozenthal, Benoit Bachelet, Philippe Bozon, Stephane Barin, Jonathan Zwikel, Laurent Meunier, Richard Aimonetto, Francois Rozenthal, Yorick Treille, Anthony Mortas, Robert Ouellet, Pierre Allard.
Coach: Stephane Sabourin.

=== Japan ===
(Japan)
Goaltenders: Dusty Imoo, Shinichi Iwasaki.
Defencemen: Yutaka Kawaguchi, Takayuki Kobori, Akihito Isojima, Tatsuki Katayama, Hiroyuki Miura, Kengo Ito, Fumitaka Miyauchi, Makoto Kawashima.
Forwards: Ryan Kuwabara, Kiyoshi Fujita, Chris Yule, Tomohito Kobayashi, Yasunori Iwata, Matthew Kabayama, Yosuke Kon, Takahito Suzuki, Taro Nihei, Yutaka Ono, Hideji Tsuchida, Masakazu Sato.
Coach: Steve Tsujiura.
