= Gachet =

Gachet is a French surname. Notable people with the surname include:

- Gabrielle Gachet (born 1980), Swiss ski mountaineer
- Grégory Gachet (born 1976), French ski mountaineer
- Jean Gachet (1894–1968), French featherweight boxer
- Paul Gachet (1828–1909), French physician
- Simon Gachet (born 1993), French racing driver
- Stéphane Gachet (born 1974), French ice hockey player
- Xavier Gachet (born 1989), French ski mountaineer

== See also ==
- "Portrait of Dr. Gachet", painting by Vincent van Gogh
- Gallery Gachet, an artist-run art gallery named after Paul Gachet
