= Martin Štěpánek =

Martin Štěpánek may refer to:

- Martin Štěpánek (actor) (1947–2010), Czech actor and politician
- Martin Štěpánek (freediver) (born 1977), Czech free-diver
- Martin Štěpánek (tennis), Czech tennis player and coach
- Martin Štěpánek (ice hockey), Czech ice hockey player, see 2000 IIHF World Championship rosters
