= Hiroyuki Miura =

Hiroyuki Miura can refer to the following:

- Hiroyuki Miura (ice hockey) (三浦 浩幸, born 1973)
- Hiroyuki Miura (shogi) (三浦 弘行, born 1974)
