= Kari Martikainen =

Finnish ice hockey player

Kari Martikainen (born September 15, 1968 in Helsinki, Finland) is a Finnish professional ice hockey defenceman.

Martikainen started his SM-liiga career at a relatively old age, playing his first game at the age of 23 with Jokerit. He was one of the team's defensive mainstays in the first half of the 1990s, and after winning the SM-liiga championship three times, he moved on to the Swiss league, where he played for SC Rapperswil-Jona and the ZSC Lions. In 2004 Martikainen returned to Jokerit, and after the 2005–06 season, he signed with Lukko.

== Career statistics ==
			Regular season					Playoffs
Season	Team	League	GP	G	A	Pts	PIM	GP	G	A	Pts	PIM
2005-06	Jokerit	SM-liiga	53	7	14	21	36	--	--	--	--	--
