= Stefan Zisser =

Italian ice hockey player (born 1980)

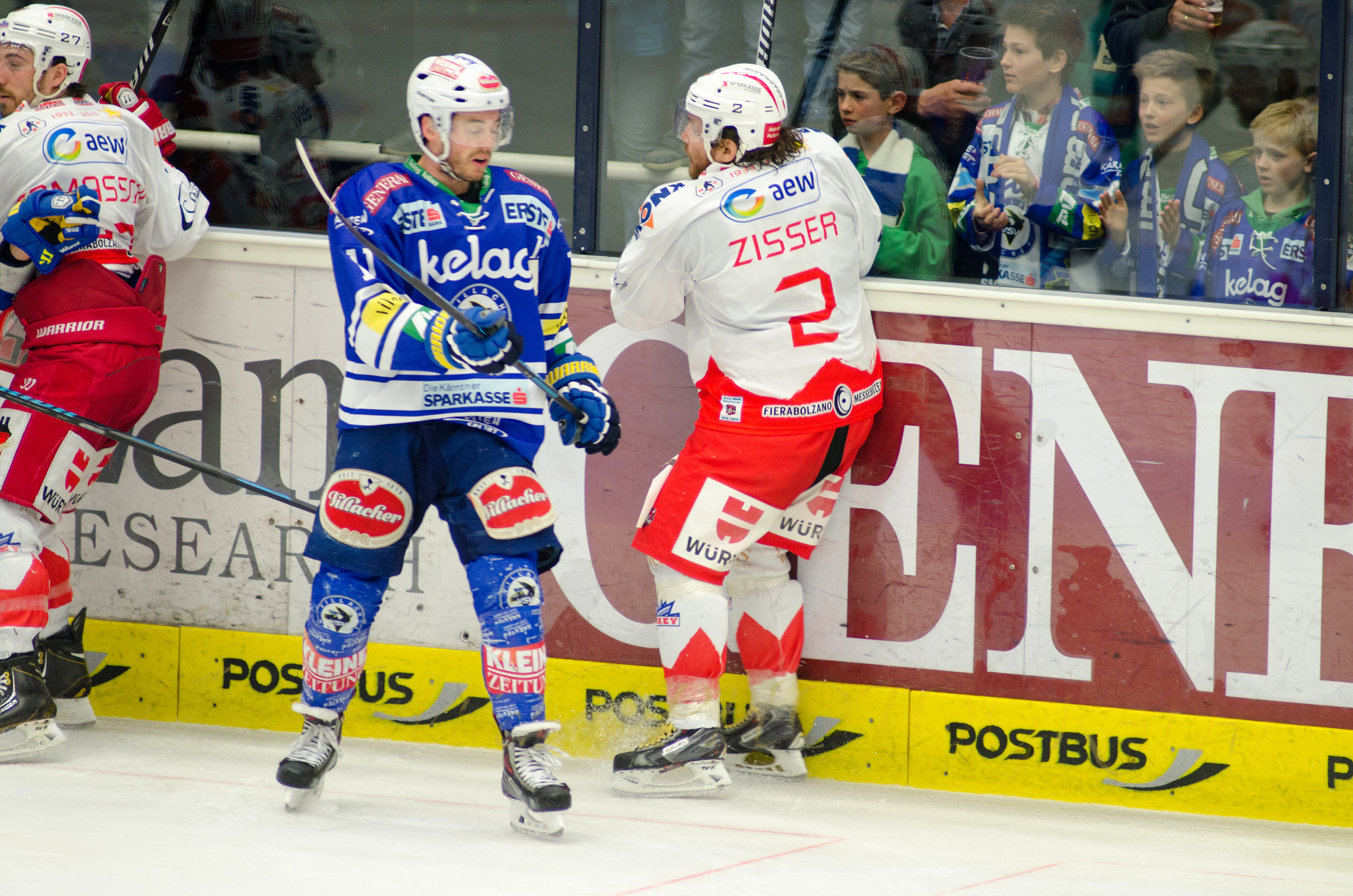
- Derek Ryan and Stefan Zisser.jpg
- Born: March 26, 1980 (age 46) Bolzano, Italy
- Height: 5 ft 7 in (170 cm)
- Weight: 185 lb (84 kg; 13 st 3 lb)
- Position: Centre
- Shot: Left
- Played for: HC Bolzano; HC Milano
- National team: Italy
- Playing career: 1999–2015

Stefan Zisser (March 26, 1980) is an Italian former professional ice hockey Forward. He most prominently played with HCB South Tyrol of the Austrian Erste Bank Eishockey Liga (EBEL).

Zisser was a veteran member of the Italy men's national ice hockey team who has participated at several Ice Hockey World Championships. He also competed for Italy in ice hockey at the 2006 Winter Olympics.
