= Václav Burda =

Czech ice hockey player

- Born: 14 January 1973 Prague, Czechoslovakia
- Died: 16 July 2018 (aged 45) Mikulčice, Czech Republic
- Height: 6 ft 0 in (183 cm)
- Weight: 190 lb (86 kg; 13 st 8 lb)
- Position: Defence
- Shot: Left
- Played for: HC Sparta Praha; Luleå HF
- National team: Czech Republic
- Playing career: 1990–2002
Medal record
World Junior Ice Hockey Championship
Bronze medal – third place	1993 Sweden	Czechoslovakia
IIHF World Championship
Bronze medal – third place	1998 Switzerland	Czech Republic

Václav Burda (14 January 1973 – 16 July 2018) was a Czech ice hockey player and a member of the 1998 bronze medal-winning Czech national team.

== Playing career ==
Unlike his peers, he came to Sparty's first training at the age of ten, thanks to his sporty versatility after two training sessions he went to play a contest. He proved that he was able to assert himself as a 17-year-old on the A-Team. During his hockey activities, he was fortunate enough to meet the legends of Czech hockey: Pavel Wohl and Josef Horešovský. In Sparta, he endured the end of the 1998-1999 season when he moved to Sweden. He played in Luleå HF for three seasons, although he barely played in his last two seasons for health reasons. Because of this, he ended his active career at the beginning of 2002. Unfortunately, he had problems with his abdominal muscles as a result of a kidney surgery.

He has played 19 games for the Czech team in which he did not score a goal.

In 1996, he played for half a year in an inline hockey league for San Jose Rhinos.

== Personal life ==
After completing his hockey career, he remained in hockey, working as a scout of the Ottawa Senators during the 2002-2003 season. Later, he was in charge of club scouting in Europe for the Edmonton Oilers.

He died in a car accident at the village of Mikulčice at the age of 45 years.

== Honours ==
HC Sparta Praha

- Czechoslovak First Ice Hockey League (1): 1992–93

Czech Republic

- IIHF World Championship third place: 1998

Czechoslovakia U20

- World Junior Ice Hockey Championship third place: 1993
