= Benoît Bachelet =

French ice hockey player

Personal information
- Nationality: French
- Born: 6 November 1974 (age 50); Gap, France

Sport
- Sport: Ice hockey

Benoît Bachelet (born 6 November 1974) is a French former ice hockey right winger. He competed in the men's tournament at the 2002 Winter Olympics.
