= Mikhail Sarmatin =

Russian ice hockey player

- Born: October 26, 1972 (age 52); Kazan, Russian SFSR, Soviet Union
- Height: 6 ft 2 in (188 cm)
- Weight: 216 lb (98 kg; 15 st 6 lb)
- Position: Left wing
- Shot: Left
- Played for: Ak Bars Kazan; Dinamo-Energija Yekaterinburg; HC Neftekhimik Nizhnekamsk; Metallurg Magnitogorsk; HC Sibir Novosibirsk; Torpedo Nizhny Novgorod; Amur Khabarovsk; Traktor Chelyabinsk
- National team: Russia
- Playing career: 1992–2009

Mikhail Sarmatin (born October 26, 1972) is a Russian former professional ice hockey forward, who played for the Russia in WC 1997, WC 1998 and WC 1999. After completing his career as a player, he became a coach.

== Awards and honors ==
| Award | Year |
|---|---|
RSL
| Winner (Ak Bars Kazan) | 1998 |
