= Gérald Guennelon =

French ice hockey player

Personal information
- Nationality: French
- Born: 22 June 1967 (age 57); Chamonix, France

Sport
- Sport: Ice hockey

Gérald Guennelon (born 22 June 1967) is a French former ice hockey defenceman. He competed in the men's tournaments at the 1992 Winter Olympics and the 1994 Winter Olympics.
