= Carlo Lorenzi =

Italian ice hockey player

Personal information
- Nationality: Italian
- Born: 2 September 1974 (age 50); Agordo, Italy

Sport
- Sport: Ice hockey

Carlo Lorenzi (born 2 September 1974) is an Italian ice hockey player. He competed in the men's tournament at the 2006 Winter Olympics.
