= Rob Schistad =

Norwegian ice hockey player

Robert Norman Schistad (born October 28, 1966) is a former Norwegian ice hockey player. He was born in Wingham, Ontario, and played for the Stavanger club Viking IK. He played for the Norwegian national ice hockey team at the 1992 and 1994 Winter Olympics.
