= Roger Dubé =

French ice hockey player

Personal information
- Nationality: French
- Born: 2 October 1965 (age 60) Sept-Îles, Quebec, Canada

Sport
- Sport: Ice hockey

Roger Dubé (born 2 October 1965) is a Canadian-born French former ice hockey player. He competed in the men's tournament at the 1998 Winter Olympics.
