= Manuel de Toni =

Italian ice hockey player

Manuel De Toni
- Born: January 10, 1979 (age 46); Feltre, Italy
- Height: 5 ft 11 in (180 cm)
- Weight: 192 lb (87 kg; 13 st 10 lb)
- Position: Centre
- Shoots: Left
- National team: Italy
- Playing career: 1995–present

Manuel de Toni (born 10 January 1979 in Feltre, Italy) is an Italian professional ice hockey player who participated at the 2006 Winter Olympics and the 2010 IIHF World Championship as a member of the Italian National men's ice hockey team.
