= Michael Lampert =

Austrian ice hockey player

Personal information
- Nationality: Austrian
- Born: 17 July 1972 (age 53) Höchst, Austria

Sport
- Sport: Ice hockey

Michael Lampert (born 17 July 1972) is an Austrian ice hockey player. He competed in the men's tournament at the 1998 Winter Olympics.
