= Svein Enok Nørstebø =

Norwegian ice hockey player

Svein Enok Nørstebø (born February 26, 1972) is a former Norwegian ice hockey player. He was born in Korsvegen, Norway. He was active at professional level from 1988 until 2004.

Nørstebø started with ice hockey as a child at the end of the 1970s for Leik in Melhus. Went in 1988 to Trondheim IK (TIK) where he had his debut game against Vålerenga. Nørstebø has played over 700 official matches for both club- and national team. After his debut for TIK in 1988 he has played for Lillehammer IK, Bad Nauheim (Germany) and Linköpings (Sweden). In all he has nine seasons at Trondheim Ishockeyklubb. He participated in the Winter Olympics for Norway in 1994 at Lillehammer.

Nørstebø has played 77 national team matches, and received Gullklokka after passed 75. He became awarded Gullpucken in 1999 an honor which is awarded to the best ice hockey player on both club and national teams.

In 2010 he did short comeback for Rosenborg to help the club up in GET-ligaen and thereby get Trondheim on the Norwegian map of hockey again.
