= Tsutsumi Otomo =

Japanese ice hockey player

Personal information
- Nationality: Japanese
- Born: 15 September 1975 (age 49); Kushiro, Japan

Sport
- Sport: Ice hockey

Tsutsumi Otomo (小友 坊, Otomo Tsutsumi, born 15 September 1975) is a Japanese ice hockey player. He competed in the men's tournament at the 1998 Winter Olympics.
