= Markus Brunner =

Italian ice hockey player

Personal information
- Nationality: Italian
- Born: 18 May 1973 (age 52) Merano, Italy

Sport
- Sport: Ice hockey

Markus Brunner (born 18 May 1973) is an Italian ice hockey player. He competed in the men's tournament at the 1998 Winter Olympics.
