= Chad Biafore =

Italian ice hockey player

Personal information
- Nationality: Italian
- Born: 28 March 1968 (age 56); Calgary, Alberta, Canada

Sport
- Sport: Ice hockey

Chad Biafore (born 28 March 1968) is an Italian ice hockey player. He competed in the men's tournament at the 1998 Winter Olympics.
