= Kent Forsberg =

Swedish ice hockey coach

- Born: 12 September 1947 (age 78); Sweden
- Occupations: ice hockey coach, founder of Forspro
- Years active: 1992–1998
- Employer(s): Modo Hockey of the Elitserien; Swedish national team; Eisbären Berlin of the Deutsche Eishockey Liga

Kent Forsberg (born 12 September 1947) is a Swedish ice hockey coach. He has coached Modo Hockey of the Elitserien and, between 1995 and 1998, the Swedish national team. He is the father of former NHL player Peter Forsberg.

== Coaching career ==
Forsberg began coaching Modo Hockey of the Elitserien in 1992–93, leading them to a 17-17-6 record. After a sub-.500 season in 1993–94, his coaching tenure ended. During his two seasons with Modo, he coached his son Peter Forsberg who was starring for the club. He took over as head coach of the Swedish national team in 1995 after Curt Lundmark. After the World Championships in 1998, he resigned. Forsberg then briefly served as a mid-season replacement as head coach of the Eisbären Berlin of the Deutsche Eishockey Liga.

== Off the ice ==
Forsberg and his son have a joint venture called Forspro. The development company co-funded the construction of Modo Hockey's Swedbank Arena in Örnsköldsvik, Sweden.
