= Stéphane Gachet =

French ice hockey defenceman

- Born: January 18, 1974 (age 51) Albertville, France
- Height: 6 ft 0 in (183 cm)
- Weight: 192 lb (87 kg; 13 st 10 lb)
- Position: Defence
- Shot: Left
- Played for: Ducs d'Angers; Lions de Lyon; Brûleurs de loups Yétis du Mont-Blanc
- National team: France
- Playing career: 1994–2007

Stéphane Gachet (born January 18, 1974) is a French former ice hockey defenceman.

Gachet played junior hockey for the Beauport Harfangs of the Quebec Major Junior Hockey League before turning professional in his native France in 1994. He played for Ducs d'Angers, Lions de Lyon, Brûleurs de loups and Yétis du Mont-Blanc. Gachet also played for the France national team in the 1998 IIHF World Championship.
