= Edgar Salis =

Swiss ice hockey player

- Born: May 20, 1970 (age 54); Chur, Switzerland
- Height: 6 ft 3 in (191 cm)
- Weight: 211 lb (96 kg; 15 st 1 lb)
- Position: Defence
- Shot: Right
- Played for: EHC Chur; SC Bern; ZSC Lions; HC Ambrì-Piotta
- National team: Switzerland
- Playing career: 1989–2005

Edgar Salis (born May 20, 1970) is a former Swiss professional ice hockey defenceman. He most recently played for ZSC Lions of the National League A. In 2002, he played for the Switzerland national ice hockey team in the Olympic Games in Salt Lake City, Utah.

== Career statistics ==
=== Regular season and playoffs ===
			Regular season					Playoffs
Season	Team	League	GP	G	A	Pts	PIM	GP	G	A	Pts	PIM
1988–89	EHC Arosa	SUI.2 U20
1989–90	EHC Arosa	SUI.2 U20
1989–90	EHC Arosa	SUI.3
1990–91	SC Rapperswil–Jona	SUI.2	36	1	5	6	48	8	2	0	2	11
1991–92	EHC Chur	NDA	28	2	8	10	67	—	—	—	—	—
1992–93	SC Bern	NDA	36	5	7	12	65	5	1	0	1	2
1993–94	Zürcher SC	NDA	36	4	9	13	62	3	0	1	1	6
1994–95	Zürcher SC	NDA	33	3	10	13	36	5	3	0	3	12
1995–96	Zürcher SC	NDA	26	7	9	16	65	4	0	0	0	12
1996–97	Zürcher SC	NDA	44	6	11	17	70	5	0	0	0	2
1997–98	HC Ambrì–Piotta	NDA	36	8	10	18	65	14	0	0	0	26
1998–99	HC Ambrì–Piotta	NDA	44	3	8	11	30	15	2	1	3	24
1999–2000	ZSC Lions	NLA	43	4	7	11	44	11	1	3	4	4
2000–01	ZSC Lions	NLA	43	4	13	17	36	15	3	3	6	20
2001–02	ZSC Lions	NLA	42	1	7	8	45	—	—	—	—	—
2002–03	ZSC Lions	NLA	35	0	9	9	26	12	0	2	2	6
2003–04	ZSC Lions	NLA	42	1	7	8	65	13	0	0	0	12
2004–05	ZSC Lions	NLA	39	0	5	5	20	15	0	1	1	14
NDA/NLA totals			527	48	120	168	696	117	10	11	21	140

=== International ===
Year	Team	Event	GP	G	A	Pts	PIM
1994	Switzerland	WC B	7	1	2	3	4
1998	Switzerland	WC	9	1	0	1	2
2000	Switzerland	WC	7	1	2	3	4
2001	Switzerland	WC	6	1	0	1	2
2002	Switzerland	OG	2	0	0	0	0
Senior totals			31	4	4	8	12
