= Peter Kasper (ice hockey) =

Austrian ice hockey player

Personal information
- Nationality: Austrian
- Born: 20 December 1974 (age 51) Klagenfurt, Austria

Sport
- Sport: Ice hockey

Peter Kasper (born 20 December 1974) is an Austrian ice hockey player. He competed in the men's tournament at the 2002 Winter Olympics.

== Personal life ==
His son, Marco Kasper, also plays hockey, and was drafted eighth overall by the Detroit Red Wings in the 2022 NHL entry draft.
