= Georg Comploi =

Italian ice hockey player

Personal information
- Nationality: Italian
- Born: 9 November 1968 (age 56); Bressanone, Italy

Sport
- Sport: Ice hockey

Georg Comploi (born 9 November 1968) is an Italian ice hockey player. He competed in the men's tournament at the 1992 Winter Olympics.
