= Michael Güntner =

Austrian ice hockey player

Personal information
- Nationality: Austrian
- Born: 3 January 1968 (age 58) Kapfenberg, Austria

Sport
- Sport: Ice hockey

Michael Güntner (born 3 January 1968) is an Austrian ice hockey player. He competed in the men's tournament at the 1994 Winter Olympics.
