= Giovanni Marchetti =

The Most Reverend Giovanni Marchetti
- Titular Archbishop of Ancyra
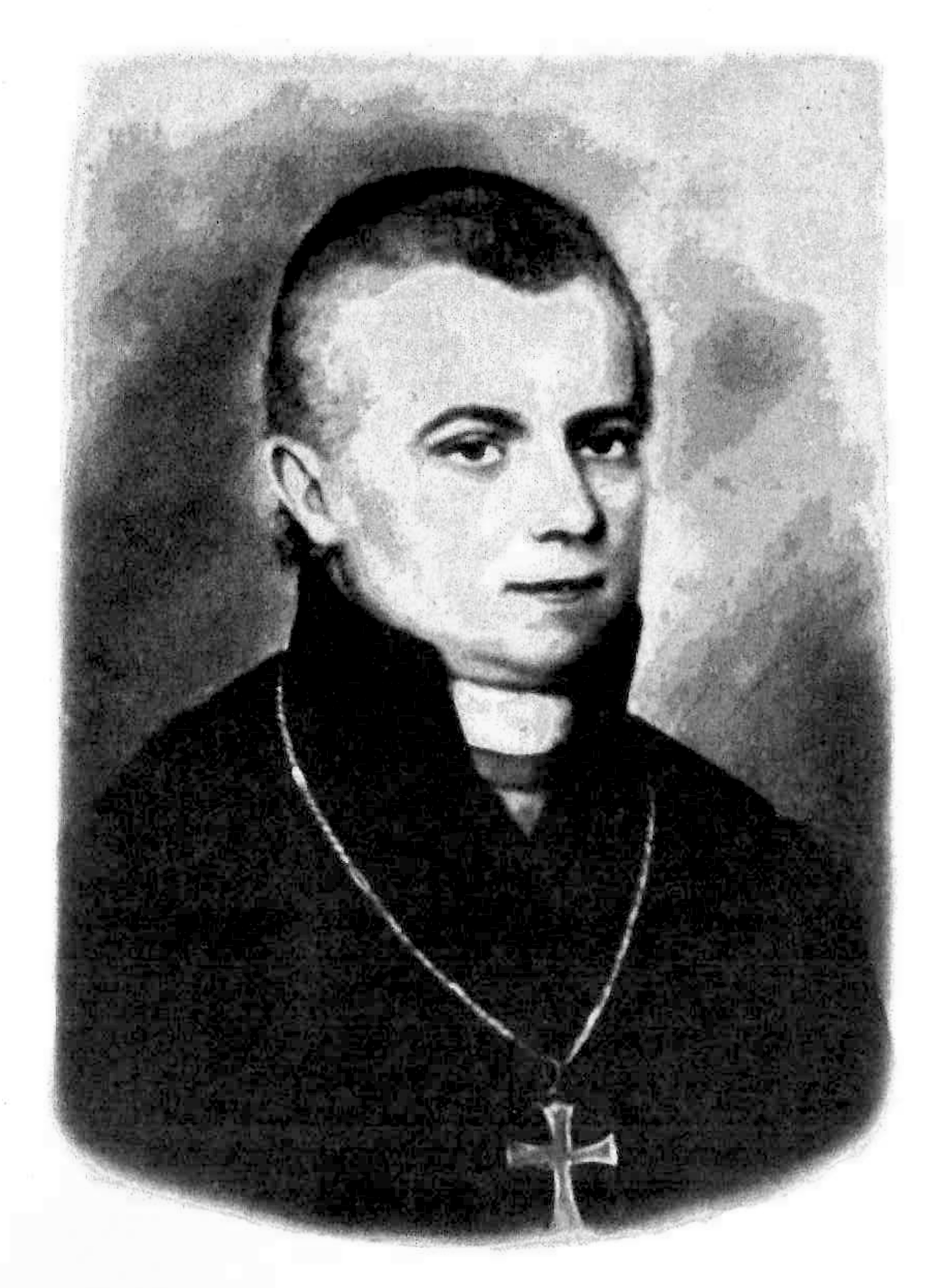
- Giovanni Marchetti
- Church: Roman Catholic Church
- In office: 1814–1829
- Predecessor: Angelo Maria Durini
- Successor: Mariano Báguena Varona

Orders
- Ordination: 20 December 1777
- Consecration: 26 September 1814 by Pope Pius VII

Personal details
- Born: April 10, 1753 Empoli, Grand Duchy of Tuscany
- Died: 15 November 1829 (aged 76) Empoli, Grand Duchy of Tuscany
- Parents: Giuseppe Marchetti and Dorotea Marchetti (née Brandi)
- Education: Roman College

Giovanni Marchetti (10 April 1753 – 15 November 1829) was a Roman Catholic archbishop of Italy. He was also Roman Catholic Titular Archbishop of Ancyra.

== Biography ==
Giovanni Marchetti was born in Empoli in 1753, the first son of Giuseppe and Dorotea Brandi. His mother died a few years later, in 1759, at the birth of the last of her daughters, Maria Giovanna; Even his father disappeared soon, in 1767. John therefore had to attend only the three younger sisters alone. Despite the economic difficulties, he succeeded in completing his legal studies and obtaining a modest seat in the Empolese tribunal. In 1773 he finally went to Rome, where to host him was a well-known missionary in his hometown that convinced him to devote himself to ecclesiastical career. He also gained the protection of Cardinal Ludwig Maria Torriggiani (1697–1777), who was able to become a student of "philosophical disciplines and sacred sciences" at the Roman College. He was ordained a priest on 20 December 1777 and graduated in theology on 12 September the following year.

Meanwhile, Marchetti had become an assiduous guest of Pope Pius VI and, at Torriggiani's death, he was housed as secretary at the court of Giuseppe Mattei, Duke of di Giove (who was at that time the head of the horse-riding body of the Pontifical State).

His will donated his works to establish a library of his writings.

== Works ==
- Critica della Storia ecclesiastica e de' discorsi del sig. abate Claudio Fleury, con un'appendice sopra il di lui continuatore. 2 vols. Bologna. 1782–83.
- Del concilio di Sardica e de' suoi canoni sulla forma de' giudizi ecclesiastici. Rome. 1785.
- Le Raciniane, ovvero Lettere d'un cattolico ad un partigiano della Storia ecclesiastica di Bonaventura Racine, 1787.
- Lezioni sacre dall'ingresso del popolo di Dio in Cananea fino alla schiavitù babilonica. 12 vols. Rome. 1803–1808.

== Bibliography ==
- Media related to Giovanni Marchetti (archbishop) at Wikimedia Commons
- Pignatelli, Giuseppe (2007). "MARCHETTI, Giovanni". Dizionario Biografico degli Italiani (in Italian). Vol. 69: Mangiabotti–Marconi. Rome: Istituto dell'Enciclopedia Italiana. ISBN 978-88-12-00032-6.
