= Robert Oberrauch =

Italian ice hockey player

- Born: November 6, 1965 (age 60) Bolzano, Italy
- Height: 6 ft 3 in (191 cm)
- Weight: 205 lb (93 kg; 14 st 9 lb)
- Position: Defence
- Shot: Right
- Played for: Bolzano-Bozen Foxes
- National team: Italy
- NHL draft: Undrafted
- Playing career: 1986–1998

Robert Oberrauch (born November 6, 1965) is a former Italian ice hockey player. He represented Italy at the Olympic games in 1992, 1994 and 1998.
