= Rick Nasheim =

Canadian-Austrian ice hockey player and coach

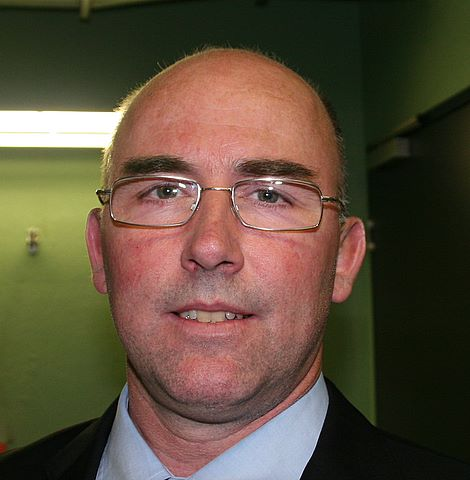
- Born: January 15, 1963 (age 63) Regina, Saskatchewan, Canada
- Height: 5 ft 11 in (180 cm)
- Weight: 187 lb (85 kg; 13 st 5 lb)
- Position: Right wing
- Shot: Left
- Played for: VEU Feldkirch; Wiener EV; EHC Linz
- National team: Austria
- Playing career: 1986–2004

Richard "Rick" Nasheim (born January 15, 1963) is a Canadian-Austrian professional ice hockey coach and a former professional ice hockey player. He has been serving as scout for EHC Linz since June 2022.

== Playing career ==
Nasheim spent the early stages of his career in his native Canada, playing for the Cowichan Valley Capitals in the BCJHL, followed by stints in the WHL with the Spokane Chiefs and Regina Pats. He then spent the 1985–86 season at the University of Regina.

He began his pro career at German second-division side EHC Klostersee, but would spend almost the remainder of his playing days in Austria. He played a total of 13 years for VEU Feldkirch and also had stints at Swiss EHC Uzwil, and two other Austrian clubs Wiener EV and EHC Linz. In the course of his career he won five Austrian championships with Feldkirch and one with Linz. He also captured four Alpenliga titles as well as the 1997-98 European Hockey League championship in 1997–98. Nasheim retired in 2004.

== International career ==
Nasheim became an Austrian citizen in 1990 and was eligible to play for the Austrian national team. He played at the 1994 and 1998 Olympic Winter Games and attended nine World Championships.

== Coaching career ==
Nasheim began his coaching career as an assistant at EHC Linz in Austria's top-flight. He remained in that position until the end of the 2009–10 season and then accepted an offer from ERC Ingolstadt of the German elite league Deutsche Eishockey Liga. When the Ingolstadt team sacked Rich Chernomaz in December 2012, Nasheim took over as head coach on an interim basis. For the 2007 World Championships, he joined the coaching staff of the Austrian national team as an assistant.

In the 2015–16 season, he served as assistant coach of Austrian EBEL side Vienna Capitals. He then worked as analyst for the Austrian TV channel Sky. In June 2017, Nasheim was named assistant coach of EBEL team Dornbirner EC, after having worked as a pro scout for the team the previous months. In June 2022, he went back to EHC Linz to lead the club's scouting department.
