= Jean-Philippe Lemoine =

French ice hockey player

Personal information
- Nationality: French
- Born: 11 September 1964 (age 60); Valence, France

Sport
- Sport: Ice hockey

Jean-Philippe Lemoine (born 11 September 1964) is a French former ice hockey player. He competed in the men's tournaments at the 1988 Winter Olympics, the 1992 Winter Olympics and the 1998 Winter Olympics.
