= Günther Lanzinger =

Austrian ice hockey player

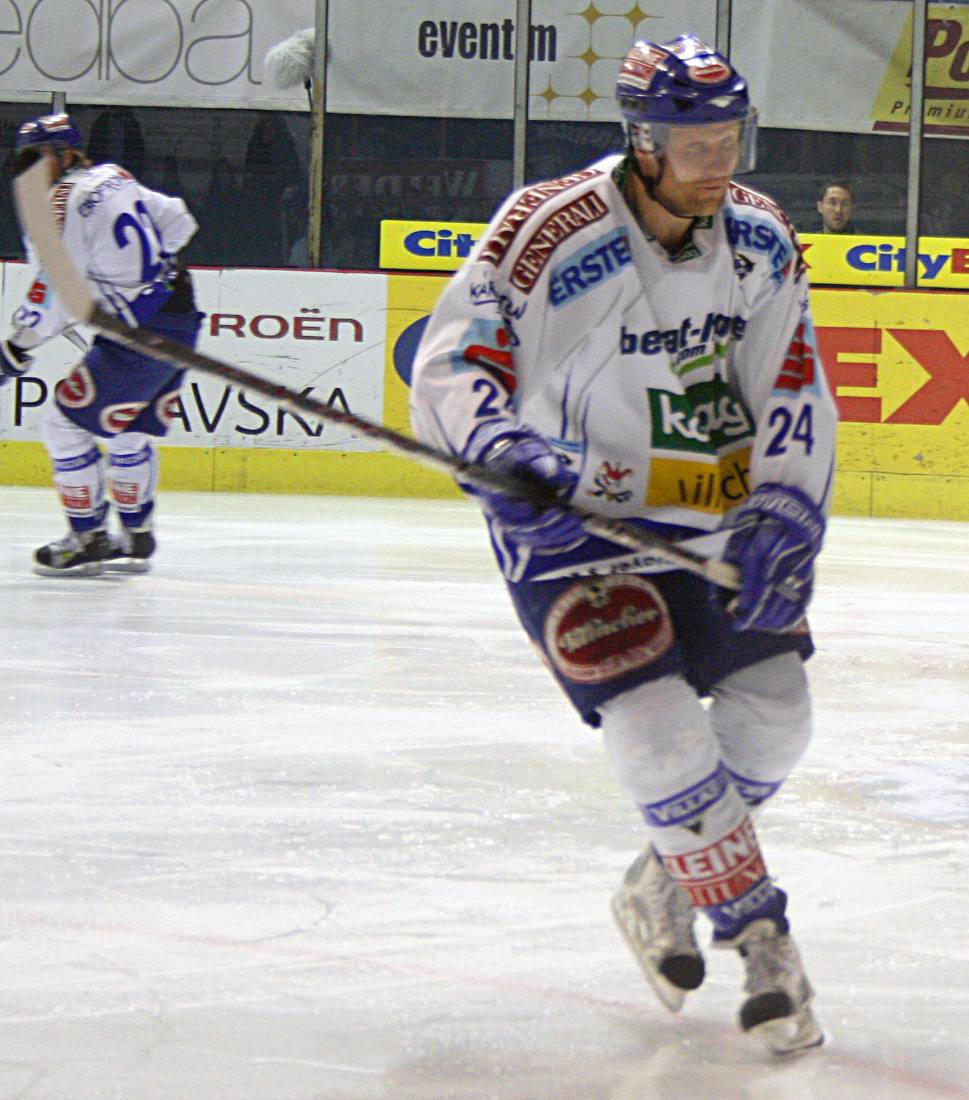
- Günter Lanzinger in 2009

Personal information
- Nationality: Austrian
- Born: 4 January 1972 (age 54) Villach, Austria

Sport
- Sport: Ice hockey

Günther Lanzinger (born 4 January 1972) is an Austrian ice hockey player. He competed in the men's tournaments at the 1994 Winter Olympics and the 2002 Winter Olympics.
