= Dino Felicetti =

Italian-Canadian ice hockey player

- Born: December 22, 1970 (age 55) Burlington, Ontario, Canada
- Height: 5 ft 10 in (178 cm)
- Weight: 203 lb (92 kg; 14 st 7 lb)
- Position: Right wing
- Shot: Left
- Played for: Fassa (Serie A); HC Milano (Serie A); ESV Kaufbeuren (DEL); Bad Nauheim (DEL)
- National team: Italy
- Playing career: 1992–2007

Dino Felicetti (born December 12, 1970) is an Italian-Canadian former professional ice hockey winger.

== Achievements ==
- 2005 – Scoring leader in the 2005 Division IB world championship.
- 2006 - Serie A Champion with HC Milano

== International play ==
Dino Felicetti played in the Olympics in 1998. Additionally, he represented Italy in the World Championships six times.
