= Christopher Bartolone =

Italian ice hockey player

Personal information
- Nationality: American/Italian
- Born: 24 February 1970 (age 55); Detroit, Michigan, United States

Sport
- Sport: Ice hockey

Christopher Bartolone (born 24 January 1970) is an Italian ice hockey player. He competed in the men's tournament at the 1998 Winter Olympics.
