= Larry Rucchin =

Italian ice hockey player

- Born: 12 May 1967; Thunder Bay, Ontario, Canada
- Died: 20 June 2002 (aged 35); Hamilton, Ontario, Canada
- Height: 6 ft 0 in (183 cm)
- Weight: 205 lb (93 kg; 14 st 9 lb)
- Position: Defence
- Shoots: Right
- Played for: HC Devils Milano; Berlin Capitals; Dundas Real McCoys
- National team: Italy

Larry Rucchin (12 May 1967 – 20 June 2002) was an Italian ice hockey player. He competed in the men's tournament at the 1998 Winter Olympics.

He's the elder brother of Steve Rucchin, who played for Canada. When Italy and Canada clashed at the 1998 World Championship, in Switzerland, Larry and Steve made history by being it the first time that brothers played each other in an international ice hockey tournament.
