= Pavol Rybár =

Slovak ice hockey player

- Born: October 12, 1971 (age 53); Skalica, Czechoslovakia
- Height: 5 ft 11 in (180 cm)
- Weight: 190 lb (86 kg; 13 st 8 lb)
- Position: Goaltender
- Caught: Left
- Played for: HC Slovan Bratislava; HK Homiel; Amur Khabarovsk; HC Znojmo; HK 36 Skalica
- National team: Slovakia
- Playing career: 1991–2011

Pavol Rybár (born 12 October 1971 in Skalica, Czechoslovakia) is a Slovak former professional ice hockey goaltender who played in HC Slovan Bratislava in the Slovak Extraliga. He played for Slovakia at the 2002 Winter Olympics.
