= François Gravel (ice hockey) =

Canadian ice hockey player (born 1968)

- Born: 21 October 1968 (age 57) Sherbrooke, Quebec, Canada
- Height: 6 ft 2 in (188 cm)
- Weight: 185 lb (84 kg; 13 st 3 lb)
- Position: Goaltender
- Caught: Left
- Played for: St. Jean Castors; Shawinigan Cataractes; Sherbrooke Canadiens; Halifax Citadels; Rochester Americans; Moncton Hawks; Charlottetown Islanders; Ducs d'Angers; Hannover Scorpions; Eisbären Berlin; Revier Lions; Asiago HC; Cortina SG
- National team: France
- NHL draft: 58th overall, 1987; Montreal Canadiens
- Playing career: 1988–2006

François Gravel (born 21 October 1968) is a retired French Canadian ice hockey player. He competed in the men's tournament at the 1998 Winter Olympics.

François Gravel is a retired professional ice hockey goaltender, renowned for his remarkable skills between the pipes and his contributions to various teams throughout his career. Born in Sherbrooke, Quebec, Gravel's journey in hockey began at a young age, eventually leading him to a successful career at both the professional and international levels.

Gravel's professional career commenced in the Quebec Major Junior Hockey League (QMJHL), where he played for the St. Jean Castors from 1985-86 to 1986-87 and later for the Shawinigan Cataractes from 1987-88 to 1988-89. His standout performances in the QMJHL caught the attention of NHL scouts, leading to his selection by the Montreal Canadiens in the 3rd round of the 1987 NHL Entry Draft, 58th overall.

In his first year of professional hockey, Gravel joined the Sherbrooke Canadiens of the American Hockey League (AHL), where he showcased his goaltending prowess. During that season, he posted an impressive record of 12 wins, 10 losses, and 3 ties.

Gravel's exceptional performance during the 1988-89 season earned him the prestigious Hap Holmes Memorial Award while playing for the Sherbrooke Canadiens. This award is bestowed upon the goaltenders of the team with the lowest goals-against average, provided they have appeared in at least 25 regular-season games.

Gravel's talent and dedication to the game also earned him a spot on the 1998 French Olympic Ice Hockey Team, representing France at the Winter Olympics in Nagano, Japan.

Later in his career, Gravel continued to ply his trade internationally, last playing for Cortina SG in the Italian A-League during the 2005-2006 season.

François Gravel's legacy in the world of hockey is marked by his outstanding achievements as a goaltender and his contributions to the sport both domestically and internationally. His accomplishments, including his recognition with the Hap Holmes Memorial Award and his participation in the Olympics, cement his status as a notable goaltender of his era.

His son is Alex Gravel who was selected 162nd overall by the Chicago Blackhawks in the 2018 NHL entry draft.
