= Hiroyuki Miura (ice hockey) =

Japanese ice hockey player

- Born: December 31, 1973 (age 52) Kushiro City, Hokkaidō, Japan
- Height: 6 ft 3 in (191 cm)
- Weight: 192 lb (87 kg; 13 st 10 lb)
- Position: Defence
- Shot: Right
- Played for: Seibu Prince Rabbits; Wheeling Thunderbirds
- National team: Japan
- NHL draft: 260th overall, 1992; Montreal Canadiens
- Playing career: 1993–2009

Hiroyuki Miura (三浦 浩幸, Miura Hiroyuki; born December 31, 1973) is a Japanese former professional ice hockey defenceman.

== Playing career ==
In 1992, Miura became the first Japanese player ever drafted into the NHL when the Montreal Canadiens chose him in the 11th round (260th overall) of the 1992 NHL entry draft. (Technically, Miura was the second Japanese player "selected" by the league; the first was Taro Tsujimoto, a fictional player drafted as a joke by the Buffalo Sabres in 1974; Miura, however was the first actual player to be drafted). Miura never played in the NHL, and his North American professional ice hockey experience was limited to six games played with the Wheeling Thunderbirds of the East Coast Hockey League in 1993–94. It wasn't until 2006 that the NHL saw its first Japanese player to actually play a game, when Yutaka Fukufuji played for the Los Angeles Kings.

Miura represented Japan at the 1993 World Junior Ice Hockey Championships in Sweden and at several World Championships. He also was a member of the Japan men's national ice hockey team at the 1998 Winter Olympics held in Nagano, Japan. Miura is a seven-time Japan Ice Hockey League champion (1994–95, 1997–98, 1998–99, 2000–01, 2001–02, 2002–03, 2003–04), winning each championship as a member of the Kokudo Keikaku Ice Hockey Club. He is unrelated to Takayuki Miura who represented Japan at the 1998 Olympics.
