= Hiroshi Matsuura =

Japanese ice hockey player

Personal information
- Nationality: Japanese
- Born: 14 May 1968 (age 57) Tomakomai, Japan

Sport
- Sport: Ice hockey

Hiroshi Matsuura (松浦 浩史, Matsuura Hiroshi; born 14 May 1968) is a Japanese former ice hockey player. He competed in the men's tournament at the 1998 Winter Olympics.
