= Takayuki Miura =

Japanese ice hockey player

Personal information
- Nationality: Japanese
- Born: 25 March 1967 (age 59) Aomori, Japan

Sport
- Sport: Ice hockey

Takayuki Miura (三浦 孝之, Miura Takayuki; born 25 March 1967) is a Japanese ice hockey player. He competed in the men's tournament at the 1998 Winter Olympics.
