= Leo Insam =

Italian ice hockey player (1975–2023)

- Born: 6 February 1975 Bolzano, Italy
- Died: 25 June 2023 (aged 48) Ortisei, Italy
- Height: 6 ft 5 in (196 cm)
- Weight: 212 lb (96 kg; 15 st 2 lb)
- Position: Defence
- Shot: Left
- Played for: HC Gherdëina; EC KAC; Düsseldorfer EG; HC Asiago; HC Milano; HC Bolzano
- National team: Italy
- Playing career: 1992–2011

Leo Giuseppe Insam (6 February 1975 – 25 June 2023) was an Italian professional ice hockey defenceman. He played the majority of his pro career in the Italian league with brief stops in Austria and Germany. Insam was a member of the Italian national team in the 1994 and 1998 Winter Olympics. Additionally he played for the junior national team three times and the senior team six times in world championships.

Insam died on 25 June 2023, at the age of 48.
