= Reto Pavoni =

Swiss ice hockey player

- Born: January 24, 1968 (age 57); Bülach, Switzerland
- Height: 5 ft 10 in (178 cm)
- Weight: 168 lb (76 kg; 12 st 0 lb)
- Position: Goaltender
- Caught: Left
- Played for: Kloten Flyers; EV Landshut; Genève-Servette HC; Krefeld Pinguine; HC Fribourg-Gottéron
- National team: Switzerland
- NHL draft: Undrafted
- Playing career: 1986–2008

Reto Pavoni (born January 24, 1968), is a retired Swiss ice hockey goaltender.

Pavoni was born in Bülach, Switzerland, and played for Kloten Flyers in the Swiss National League A. He also represented the Switzerland men's national ice hockey team on several occasions in the World Junior Championships, World Championships and Olympics.
