= Miroslav Šimonovič =

Slovak ice hockey player

- Born: 10 August 1977 (age 48) Poprad, Czechoslovakia
- Height: 6 ft 0 in (183 cm)
- Weight: 181 lb (82 kg; 12 st 13 lb)
- Position: Goaltender
- Caught: Left
- Played for: HK Poprad; HK Spišská Nová Ves; HC Košice; Vlci Žilina; HKM Zvolen; HC '05 Banská Bystrica
- National team: Slovakia
- Playing career: 1994–2012

Miroslav Šimonovič (born 10 August 1977) is a former Slovak professional ice hockey goaltender.

Medal record

Representing Slovakia

Ice hockey

World Championships
Gold medal – first place	2002 Sweden	

== Awards and honors ==
Award	Year
Slovak
Champion	1999
