= Matthew Kabayama =

Japanese ice hockey player

Personal information
- Nationality: Japanese
- Born: 18 November 1965 (age 59); Coaldale, Alberta, Canada

Sport
- Sport: Ice hockey

Matthew Kabayama (born 18 November 1965) is a Canadian-born Japanese former professional ice hockey player.

Kabayama began his career in junior level for the Western Hockey League's Medicine Hat Tigers between 1981 and 1985. He then turned professional in Germany, playing in the 2nd Bundesliga for ERC Sonthofen and the Eishockey Bundesliga for Schwenninger ERC.

In 1994, Kabayama moved to the Japan Ice Hockey League and spent nine seasons with Seibu Tetsudo. In 2003, he joined the Nippon Paper Cranes, spending two seasons with the team before retiring in 2005. He competed in the men's tournament at the 1998 Winter Olympics for Japan.
