= Ryan Kuwabara =

Japanese-Canadian ice hockey player and coach

- Born: 23 March 1972 (age 54) Hamilton, Ontario, Canada
- Height: 6 ft 0 in (183 cm)
- Weight: 209 lb (95 kg; 14 st 13 lb)
- Position: Right wing
- Shot: Right
- Played for: Fredericton Canadiens; Kokudo IHC; Belfast Giants; Nippon Paper Cranes; High1
- Coached for: Stoney Creek Warriors; Ancaster Avalanche; Saginaw Spirit; Flint Firebirds; Wheeling Nailers; Niagara IceDogs
- National team: Japan
- NHL draft: 39th overall, 1990; Montreal Canadiens
- Playing career: 1992–2010
- Coaching career: 2010–present
Medal record
Asian Winter Games
Gold medal – first place	2003 Aomori	Ice hockey
Silver medal – second place	1999 Gangneung	Ice hockey

Ryan Haruo Kuwabara (桑原 ライアン 春男, Kuwabara Raian Haruo; born 23 March 1972) is a Japanese-Canadian former professional ice hockey player and the former head coach of the Niagara IceDogs in the Ontario Hockey League (OHL).

He represented Japan in the men's tournament at the 1998 Winter Olympics.

In August 2021, he became an assistant coach for the Wheeling Nailers, with whom he had been a player on the inaugural 1992-93 team, which reached the Riley Cup Final.
