= Grégory Dubois =

French ice hockey player

Personal information
- Nationality: French
- Born: 27 March 1975 (age 49); Dunkirk, France

Sport
- Sport: Ice hockey

Grégory Dubois (born 27 March 1975) is a French ice hockey player. He competed in the men's tournament at the 1998 Winter Olympics.
