= Lucio Topatigh =

Italian ice hockey player (born 1965)

- Born: 19 October 1965 (age 60) Gallio, Italy
- Height: 188 cm (6 ft 2 in)
- Weight: 85 kg (187 lb; 13 st 5 lb)
- Position: Right wing
- Shot: Left
- Played for: Asiago Hockey AS; HC Bolzano; HC Devils Milano
- National team: Italy
- Playing career: 1984–2008

Lucio Topatigh (born 19 October 1965) is a former Italian ice hockey player.

Born in Gallio, Vicenza, Topatigh spent all his career in Serie A league, with Asiago Hockey A.S., HC Devils Milano and Hockey Club Bolzano-Bozen. He won seven times the Scudetto: five with Bolzano, and one with both Devils and Asiago. With Asiago Topatigh won also a Supercoppa italiana and two times the Coppa Italia.

Topatigh, also known as Il falco di Gallio ("The Hawk of Gallio"), played from 1990 until 2002 also in the Blue Team, the Italian national ice hockey team. Mickey Goulet, the Italian coach, recalled Topatigh for 2006 Winter Olympics. Topatigh was the oldest Italian player at those Olympics in Turin. In 2008 he retired from professional hockey.

Topatigh was honored by the International Ice Hockey Federation in 2015, as the first winner of the Torriani Award.
