= Yutaka Kawaguchi =

Japanese ice hockey player (born 1973)

Personal information
- Nationality: Japanese
- Born: 5 April 1973 (age 51); Kisarazu, Japan

Sport
- Sport: Ice hockey

Yutaka Kawaguchi (川口 寛, Kawaguchi Yutaka, born 5 April 1973) is a Japanese ice hockey player. He competed in the men's tournament at the 1998 Winter Olympics.
