= Dusty Imoo =

Japanese ice hockey player

- Born: 18 July 1970 (age 55) New Westminster, British Columbia, Canada
- Height: 5 ft 8 in (173 cm)
- Weight: 150 lb (68 kg; 10 st 10 lb)
- Position: Goaltender
- Caught: Left
- Played for: Cincinnati Cyclones; Erie Panthers; Dayton Bombers; Fort Wayne Komets; Seibu Tetsudo; Oji Eagles
- National team: Japan
- Playing career: 1991–2006

Dusty Imoo (芋生 ダスティ, Imō Dasuti; born 18 July 1970) is a Canadian-Japanese former professional ice hockey goaltender

== Career ==
Imoo was born in New Westminster, British Columbia. He played in the Western Hockey League for the New Westminster Bruins, Lethbridge Hurricanes and Regina Pats between 1987 and 1991. In his first professional season, the 1991–92 season, Imoo played for four different teams; the East Coast Hockey League's Cincinnati Cyclones, Erie Panthers and Dayton Bombers as well as the International Hockey League's Fort Wayne Komets.

Imoo would then go to Japan to play in the Japan Ice Hockey League for Seibu Tetsudo. He remained with the team until 2003 when he signed for the Oji Eagles. Imoo also played for the Japan national team, playing in three Ice Hockey World Championships as well as in the men's tournament at the 1998 Winter Olympics.

After retiring in 2006, Imoo returned to Canada, becoming a goaltending consultant for the Surrey Eagles of the British Columbia Hockey League. He later became the goaltending coach for the WHL's Seattle Thunderbirds and the St. John's Ice Caps of the American Hockey League before becoming the goaltending coach of the Los Angeles Kings of the National Hockey League in 2015. In 2019, Imoo became the goaltending coach of the KHL's Kunlun Red Star. In 2021, Imoo was hired as goalie coach of the Toronto Marlies. He was let go shortly after transphobic likes and retweets of his were found on his Twitter account.
