= Shinichi Iwasaki =

Japanese ice hockey player

Personal information
- Nationality: Japanese
- Born: 21 August 1968 (age 56); Kuriyama, Japan

Sport
- Sport: Ice hockey

Shinichi Iwasaki (岩崎 伸一, Iwasaki Shin'ichi, born 21 August 1968) is a Japanese ice hockey player. He competed in the men's tournament at the 1998 Winter Olympics.
