= Robert Ouellet =

Canadian-French ice hockey player

- Born: May 18, 1968 (age 58) Montreal, Quebec, Canada
- Height: 5 ft 10 in (178 cm)
- Weight: 176 lb (80 kg; 12 st 8 lb)
- Position: Centre
- Shot: Left
- Played for: Anglet Hormadi Élite; Ducs d'Angers; Brest Albatros Hockey; Brûleurs de loups Krefeld Pinguine
- National team: France
- Playing career: 1991–2002

Robert Ouellet (born May 18, 1968) is a former Canadian–French professional ice hockey player who participated in ice hockey at the 1998 Winter Olympics as a member of the France men's national ice hockey team. He also competed with France at five Ice Hockey World Championships (1996–2000).

His son, Xavier Ouellet, is a hockey defenseman who is currently playing for HC Dinamo Minsk of the Kontinental Hockey League (KHL). He was named to the QMJHL All-Rookie team in 2009-10. Xavier was drafted in the 2nd round (48th overall) in the 2011 NHL entry draft by the Detroit Red Wings.
