= Stéphane Barin =

French ice hockey player

Personal information
- Nationality: French
- Born: 8 January 1971 (age 54); Saint-Martin-d'Hères, France

Sport
- Sport: Ice hockey

Stéphane Barin (born 8 January 1971) is a French former ice hockey player. He competed in the men's tournaments at the 1992, 1994, 1998 and the 2002 Winter Olympics.
