= Christian Perthaler =

Austrian ice hockey player

- Born: July 21, 1968 (age 57) Innsbruck, AUT
- Height: 6 ft 0 in (183 cm)
- Weight: 198 lb (90 kg; 14 st 2 lb)
- Position: Right wing
- Shot: Left
- Played for: Innsbrucker EV; EK Zell am See; Klagenfurt AC; VEU Feldkirch; EHC Black Wings Linz
- National team: Austria
- Playing career: 1988–2008

Christian Perthaler (born July 21, 1968 in Innsbruck, Austria) is an Austrian former ice hockey right winger.

Perthaler began his career with his hometown team Innsbrucker EV, where he spent four seasons. He moved to EK Zell am See for one season before joining Klagenfurt AC, spending three seasons with them. He spent one season with VEU Feldkirch before rejoining Klagenfurt. In 2001, he joined EHC Black Wings Linz and remained with the team until his retirement in 2008 at the age of 40. He also represented Austria at the 1998 Winter Olympics and the 2002 Winter Olympics.
