= Pierre Allard =

Canadian ice hockey player (born 1972)

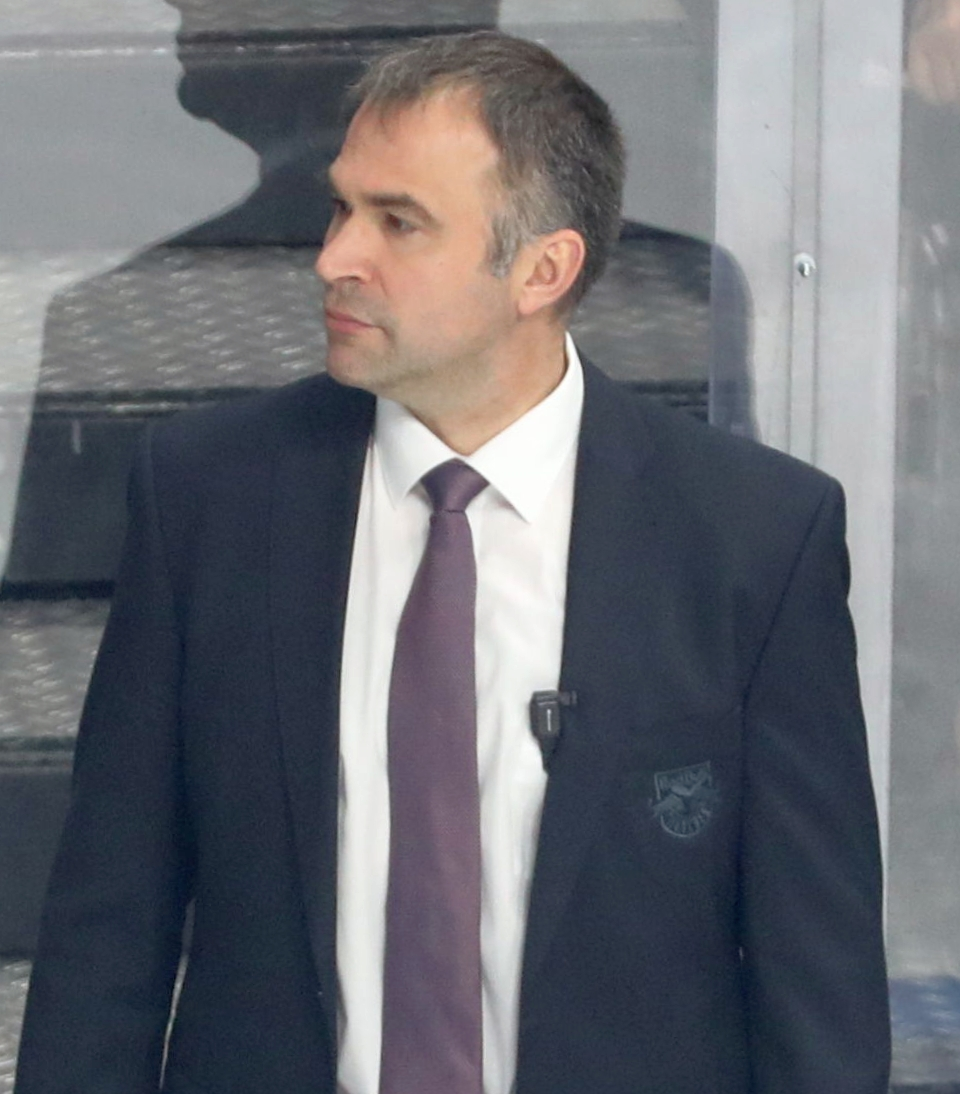
- Born: August 19, 1972 (age 53) Montreal, Quebec, Canada
- Height: 5 ft 11 in (180 cm)
- Weight: 186 lb (84 kg; 13 st 4 lb)
- Position: Right wing
- Shot: Right
- Played for: Saint-Hyacinthe Cousin; Rouen HE Les Dragons; Manchester Storm; Grenoble Brûleurs de Loups; ASG Angers Les Ducs; HC Font-Romeu; Chicoutimi Sagueneens; Shawinigan Cataractes; Saint-Hyacinthe Laser
- National team: France
- Playing career: 1993–2005

Pierre Allard (born August 19, 1972) is a former professional ice hockey player.

Allard represented France in the 1998 Winter Olympics.
