= Arnaud Briand =

French ice hockey player

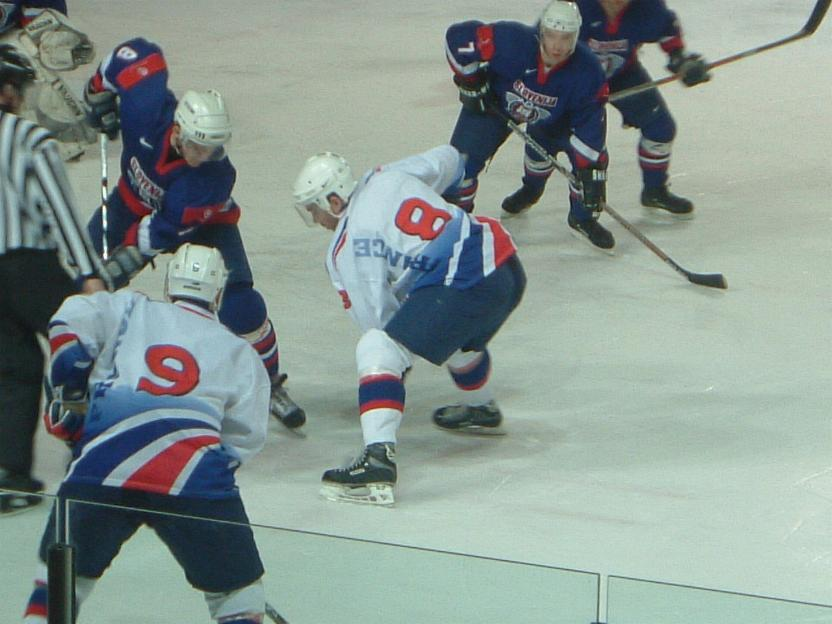

Personal information
- Nationality: French
- Born: 29 April 1970 (age 55); Sydney, Nova Scotia, Canada

Sport
- Sport: Ice hockey

Arnaud Briand (born 29 April 1970) is a Canadian-born French former ice hockey player. He competed in the men's tournaments at the 1992, 1994, 1998 and the 2002 Winter Olympics.
