= Takayuki Kobori =

Japanese ice hockey player

Personal information
- Nationality: Japanese
- Born: 20 April 1969 (age 55); Tomakomai, Japan

Sport
- Sport: Ice hockey

Takayuki Kobori (小堀 恭之, Kobori Takayuki, born 20 April 1969) is a Japanese ice hockey player. He competed in the men's tournament at the 1998 Winter Olympics.
