= Roland Ramoser =

Italian ice hockey player

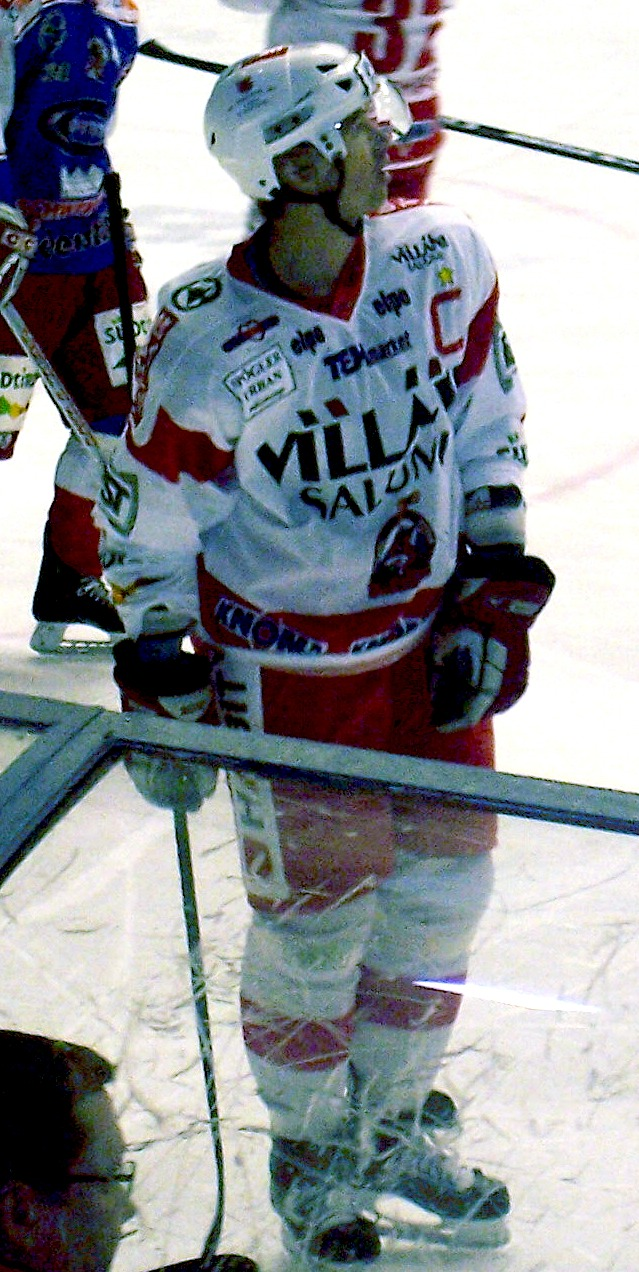
- Born: September 3, 1972 (age 52); Ritten, Italy
- Height: 6 ft 3 in (191 cm)
- Weight: 205 lb (93 kg; 14 st 9 lb)
- Position: Right wing
- Shot: Right
- National team: Italy
- Playing career: 1992–2011

Roland Ramoser (born September 3, 1972) is retired Italian ice hockey player who participated at the 2010 IIHF World Championship as a member of the Italy men's national ice hockey team. Over the course of his career he participated in 17 IIHF World Championship tournaments, 13 in the top division. At the time of his retirement in 2011, Ramoser had participated in the second most World Championships, behind Tommy Jakobsen of Norway. At the age of 18 he went to Canada and played for the Hull Olympiques of the Quebec Major Junior Hockey League and the Kamloops Blazers of the Western Hockey League before going back to Europe.
