= Tatsuki Katayama =

Japanese ice hockey player

Personal information
- Nationality: Japanese
- Born: 26 January 1973 (age 52); Kushiro, Japan

Sport
- Sport: Ice hockey

Tatsuki Katayama (片山 立規, Katayama Tatsuki, born 26 January 1973) is a Japanese ice hockey player. He competed in the men's tournament at the 1998 Winter Olympics.
