= Richard Aimonetto =

Finnish ice hockey centre

- Born: January 24, 1973 (age 52) Chamonix, France
- Height: 6 ft 0 in (183 cm)
- Weight: 190 lb (86 kg; 13 st 8 lb)
- Position: Centre
- Shoots: Left
- FFHG Division 1 team Former teams: Yétis du Mont-Blanc; Chamonix HC; Brûleurs de Loups; Lions de Lyons; Hockey Club de Reims; Scorpions de Mulhouse; Gothiques d'Amiens
- National team: France
- Playing career: 1993–present

Richard Aimonetto (born 24 January 1973) is a French ice hockey centre currently playing for Yétis du Mont-Blanc of the FFHG Division 1.

Aimonetto previously played in the Ligue Magnus for Chamonix HC, Brûleurs de Loups, Lions de Lyons, Hockey Club de Reims, Scorpions de Mulhouse and Gothiques d'Amiens. He competed in the 1998 and 2002 Winter Olympics.
