= Adolf Insam =

Italian ice hockey player

Personal information
- Nationality: Italian
- Born: 4 August 1951 (age 75) Sëlva, Italy

Sport
- Sport: Ice hockey

Adolf Insam (born 4 August 1951) is an Italian ice hockey player. He competed in the men's tournament at the 1984 Winter Olympics.
