= Stefano Margoni =

Italian ice hockey player

- Born: May 12, 1975 (age 49); Pozza di Fassa, Italy
- Height: 6 ft 0 in (183 cm)
- Weight: 181 lb (82 kg; 12 st 13 lb)
- Position: Left wing
- Shot: Left
- National team: Italy
- Playing career: 1992–2013

Stefano Margoni (born May 12, 1975) is an Italian professional ice hockey player who participated at the 2010 IIHF World Championship as a member of the Italian National men's ice hockey team. He also competed at the 1998 Winter Olympics and the 2006 Winter Olympics.
