= Jean-Christophe Filippin =

French ice hockey player

Personal information
- Nationality: French
- Born: 18 May 1969 (age 56) Ambilly, France

Sport
- Sport: Ice hockey

Jean-Christophe Filippin (born 18 May 1969) is a French ice hockey player. He competed in the men's tournament at the 1998 Winter Olympics.
