= Karl DeWolf =

French ice hockey player

Personal information
- Nationality: French
- Born: 21 February 1972 (age 53); Lille, France

Sport
- Sport: Ice hockey

Karl DeWolf (born 21 February 1972) is a French former ice hockey player. He competed in the men's tournaments at the 1998 Winter Olympics and the 2002 Winter Olympics.
