= List of Olympic men's ice hockey players for Kazakhstan =

The list of Olympic men's ice hockey players for Kazakhstan consists of 35 skaters and 3 goaltenders. Men's ice hockey tournaments have been staged at the Olympic Games since 1920 (it was introduced at the 1920 Summer Olympics, and was permanently added to the Winter Olympic Games in 1924). Kazakhstan has participated in two tournaments since becoming independent in 1991: 1998 and 2006.

Eight players (seven skaters and one goaltender) participated in both 1998 and 2006. Six of them – Vladimir Antipin, Dmitri Dudarev, Alexander Koreshkov, Yevgeni Koreshkov, Andrei Pchelyakov, and Konstantin Shafranov – played in the most games, with 12. Yevgeni Koreshkov scored the most goals (7), while his brother Alexander had the most assists (7); they are tied for the most points (11).

== Key ==
General terms
Term	Definition
GP	Games played
Olympics	Number of Olympic Games tournaments
Ref(s)	Reference(s)

Goaltender statistical abbreviations
Abbreviation	Definition
W	Wins
L	Losses
T	Ties
Min	Minutes played
SO	Shutouts
GA	Goals against
GAA	Goals against average

Skater statistical abbreviations
Abbreviation	Definition
G	Goals
A	Assists
P	Points
PIM	Penalty minutes

== Goaltenders ==
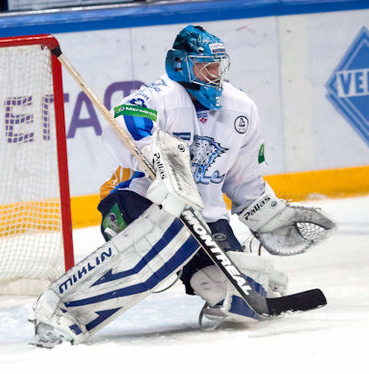
Vitali Yeremeyev appeared in both the 1998 and 2006 Winter Olympics.

Goaltenders
Player	Olympics	Tournament(s)	GP	W	L	T	Min	SO	GA	GAA	Ref(s)
Vitali Kolesnik	1	2006	2	0	2	0	120	0	6	3.00	
Alexander Shimin	1	1998	5	1	0	0	128	0	12	5.61	
Vitali Yeremeyev	2	1998, 2006	10	3	6	0	472	0	38	4.83	

== Skaters ==
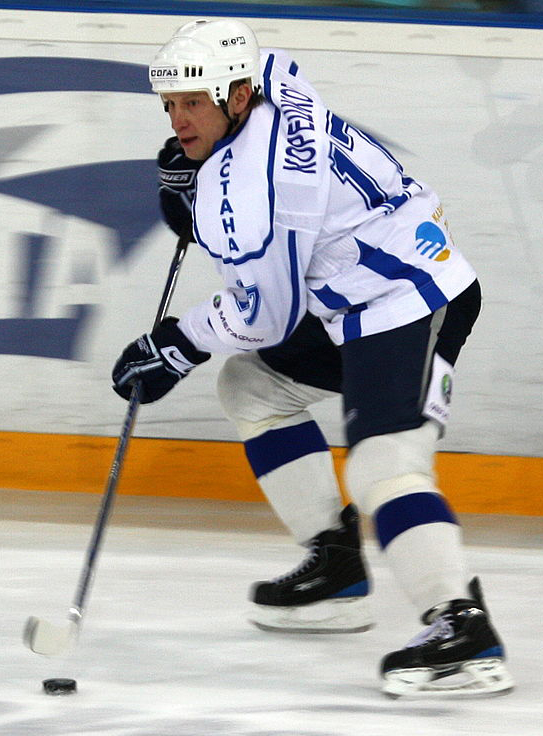
Alexander Koreshkov recorded the most assists (7), and is tied for most points (11).

Skaters
Player	Olympics	Tournaments	GP	G	A	P	PIM	Notes	Ref(s)
Sergei Alexandrov	1	2006	5	1	0	1	2		
Vladimir Antipin	2	1998, 2006	12	2	1	3	8		
Nikolai Antropov	1	2006	5	1	0	1	4		
Artyom Argokov	1	2006	5	0	0	0	8		
Yevgeni Blokhin	1	2006	2	0	0	0	0		
Mikhail Borodulin	1	1998	7	3	0	3	10		
Pyotr Devyatkin	1	1998	7	0	0	0	27		
Igor Dorokhin	1	1998	7	0	0	0	4		
Dmitri Dudarev	2	1998, 2006	12	1	1	2	2		
Vadim Glovatsky	1	1998	7	0	2	2	6		
Pavel Kamentsev	1	1998	7	2	0	2	4		
Alexei Koledayev	1	2006	5	0	0	0	10		
Alexander Koreshkov	2	1998, 2006	12	4	8	12	2	Team captain (2006)	
Yevgeni Koreshkov	2	1998, 2006	12	7	3	10	14		
Oleg Kovalenko	1	2006	5	0	0	0	4		
Oleg Kryazhev	1	1998	7	0	0	0	0		
Igor Nikitin	1	1998	7	1	0	1	6		
Andrei Ogorodnikov	1	2006	5	0	0	0	4		
Andrei Pchelyakov	2	1998, 2006	12	1	2	3	8		
Fyodor Polischuk	1	2006	5	0	1	1	6		
Yevgeni Pupkov	1	2006	5	0	0	0	6		
Yerlan Sagymbayev	1	1998	7	1	0	1	4		
Andrei Samokhvalov	1	2006	5	0	0	0	0		
Andrei Savenkov	2	1998, 2006	9	0	2	2	4		
Konstantin Shafranov	2	1998, 2006	12	4	3	7	6		
Denis Shemelin	1	2006	5	0	0	0	4		
Andrei Sokolov	1	1998	7	1	1	2	4		
Vitali Tregubov	1	1998	7	1	0	1	4		
Alexei Troschinsky	1	1998	7	0	1	1	32		
Andrei Troschinsky	1	2006	5	0	1	1	6		
Dmitri Upper	1	2006	5	0	1	1	8		
Alexei Vasilchenko	1	2006	5	0	1	1	8		
Vladimir Zavyalov	1	1998	7	0	3	3	4		
Igor Zemlyanoy	1	1998	7	0	3	3	8		

== See also ==
- Kazakhstan men's national ice hockey team
