= Ice hockey at the 1998 Winter Olympics – Men's tournament =

1998 Winter Olympics Men's Ice Hockey
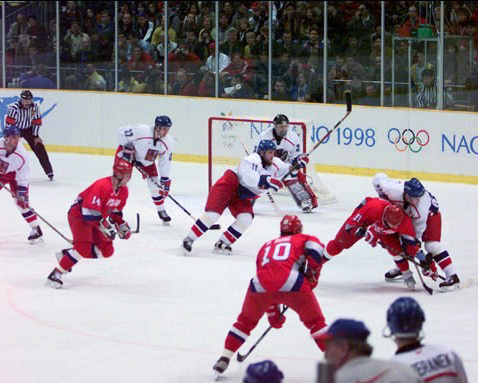
- Team Czech Republic vs Team Russia in the gold medal game

Tournament details
- Host country: Japan
- Venue(s): Big Hat; Aqua Wing Arena
- Dates: 7–22 February
- Teams: 14

Final positions
- Champions: Czech Republic (1st title)
- Runners-up: Russia
- Third place: Finland
- Fourth place: Canada

Tournament statistics
- Games played: 35
- Goals scored: 210 (6 per game)
- Scoring leader: (Finland) Teemu Selänne (10 points)

The men's ice hockey tournament at the 1998 Winter Olympics in Nagano, Japan, was the 19th Olympic Championship. The Czech Republic, which emerged from the dissolution of Czechoslovakia in 1993, won its first gold medal, becoming the seventh nation to win Olympic ice hockey gold. The tournament, held from February 7 to February 22, was played at the Big Hat and Aqua Wing arenas.

This was the first Olympics in which the National Hockey League (NHL) took a break (17 days, from February 8 to February 24) allowing national teams to include NHL players from each country. Unlike basketball's Dream Team in 1992, where the players stayed in a hotel in Barcelona due to security concerns, NHL players stayed in the Olympic Village due to improved security measures.

The favored Canadian team, despite a strong start in the round robin, lost their semifinal match against the Czech Republic in a shootout. Finland then beat Canada in the bronze medal game 3–2. In the final, the Czech Republic defeated Russia 1–0 to win the gold medal, with goaltender Dominik Hašek producing a memorable performance throughout the tournament.

== Preliminary round ==
All times are local (UTC+9).

=== Group A ===
| Pos | Team | Pld | W | D | L | GF | GA | GD | Pts | Qualification |
|---|---|---|---|---|---|---|---|---|---|---|
| 1 | Kazakhstan | 3 | 2 | 1 | 0 | 14 | 11 | +3 | 5 | First Round |
| 2 | Slovakia | 3 | 1 | 1 | 1 | 9 | 9 | 0 | 3 | |
| 3 | Italy | 3 | 1 | 0 | 2 | 11 | 11 | 0 | 2 | |
| 4 | Austria | 3 | 0 | 2 | 1 | 9 | 12 | −3 | 2 | |

Source: Olympedia

| 7 February 1998; 16:00 | Italy | 3–5 (3–1, 0–1, 0–3) | Kazakhstan | The Big Hat, Nagano, Japan; Attendance: 8,634 |

Mike Rosati
Goalies
Vitali Yeremeyev
Alexander Shimin
Referee:
(Germany) Gerhard Müller
Linesmen:
(Finland) Janne Rautavuori
(Sweden) Ulf Rönnmark

| | 0–1 | 12:11 − Tregubov (Zavyalov, Pchelyakov) (PP) |
| Zarrillo (Orlando)− 13:04 | 1–1 |
| Felicetti (Figliuzzi) − 14:22 | 2–1 |
| Zarrillo (Nardella, Orlando) (PP) − 19:55 | 3–1 |
| | 3–2 | 25:49 − Borodulin (Glovatsky) |
| | 3–3 | 41:42 − Dudarev (Savenkov) |
| | 3–4 | 47:44 − Borodulin (A. Koreshkov, Zemlyanoy) (PP) |
| | 3–5 | 56:01 − Kamentsev (Dudarev) (SH) |

12 min
Penalties
10 min
18
Shots
21

| 7 February 1998; 16:00 | Austria | 2–2 (1–0, 1–2, 0–0) | Slovakia | Aqua Wing Arena, Nagano, Japan; Attendance: 4,315 |

Claus Dalpiaz
Goalies
Igor Murín
Referee:
(Finland) Pekka Haajanen
Linesmen:
(Russia) Alexander Poliakov
(Germany) Thomas Schurr

| Lavoie (Ulrich) (PP) − 07:16 | 1–0 |
| Perthaler (Schaden) − 23:30 | 2–0 |
| | 2–1 | 26:35 − Cíger |
| | 2–2 | 33:52 − Petrovický (Kontšek, Sekeráš) (PP) |

12 min
Penalties
22 min
12
Shots
38

| 8 February 1998; 14:00 | Austria | 5–5 (2–2, 2–1, 1–2) | Kazakhstan | The Big Hat, Nagano, Japan; Attendance: 9,410 |

Claus Dalpiaz
Goalies
Alexander Shimin
Vitali Yeremeyev
Referee:
(Russia) Leonid Vaisfeld
Linesmen:
(Canada) Kenneth Sartison
(United States) Timothy Kotyra

| Puschnik (Nasheim) − 00:33 | 1–0 |
| | 1–1 | 07:12 − Pchelyakov (Zavyalov) (SH) |
| | 1–2 | 13:09 − Shafranov |
| Lavoie − 15:37 | 2–2 |
| Pusnik (Searle) (PP) − 31:16 | 3–2 |
| Lavoie (Perthaler) − 34:20 | 4–2 |
| | 4–3 | 39:46 − Y. Koreshkov (Zemlyanoy, A. Koreshkov) (PP) |
| | 4–4 | 53:30 − Sokolov (Shafranov, A. Koreshkov) |
| | 4–5 | 58:08 − A. Koreshkov (Shafranov) |
| Pusnik (Lavoie) (PP) − 58:51 | 5–5 |

20 min
Penalties
38 min
25
Shots
23

| 8 February 1998; 18:00 | Slovakia | 4–3 (1–2, 3–1, 0–0) | Italy | The Big Hat, Nagano, Japan; Attendance: 8,620 |

Igor Murín
Goalies
Mario Brunetta
Referee:
(Sweden) Bengt Andersson
Linesmen:
(Germany) Thomas Schurr
(Japan) Hirokazu Takahashi

| Plavucha (Sekeráš) − 06:41 | 1–0 |
| | 1–1 | 08:50 − Figliuzzi (Insam) (PP) |
| | 1–2 | 11:56 − Felicetti (Mansi, De Angelis) |
| Plavucha (Daňo) − 21:23 | 2–2 |
| Petrovický − 22:00 | 3–2 |
| Plavucha (Sekeráš, Cíger) − 23:36 | 4–2 |
| | 4–3 | 39:13 − Chitaroni (Ramoser) |

12 min
Penalties
20 min
22
Shots
28

| 10 February 1998; 14:00 | Slovakia | 3–4 (1–1, 1–0, 1–3) | Kazakhstan | Aqua Wing Arena, Nagano, Japan; Attendance: 3,659 |

Igor Murín
Goalies
Vitali Yeremeyev
Referee:
(Germany) Gerhard Müller
Linesmen:
(Finland) Janne Rautavuori
(Sweden) Ulf Rönnmark

| Plavucha (Daňo) − 05:42 | 1–0 |
| | 1–1 | 09:07 − Y. Koreshkov (Sokolov) (PP) |
| Jánoš (Petrovický) − 28:03 | 2–1 |
| | 2–2 | 42:55 − Borodulin (Zavyalov) |
| | 2–3 | 47:04 − Shafranov (A. Koreshkov, Y. Koreshkov) |
| Bondra (Švehla) (PP) − 52:16 | 3–3 |
| | 3–4 | 58:39 − A. Koreshkov (Zemlyanoy) |

8 min
Penalties
8 min
32
Shots
25

| 10 February 1998; 18:00 | Italy | 5–2 (2–0, 2–0, 1–2) | Austria | The Big Hat, Nagano, Japan; Attendance: 8,473 |

Mike Rosati
Goalies
Claus Dalpiaz
Referee:
(United States) Brad Meier
Linesmen:
(Czech Republic) Václav Český
(Slovakia) Rudolf Lauff

| Figliuzzi (Biafore) − 05:18 | 1–0 |
| Figliuzzi − 12:41 | 2–0 |
| Chitaroni (De Angelis, Busillo) (PP) − 27:49 | 3–0 |
| Ramoser (Nardella) − 36:57 | 4–0 |
| | 4–1 | 43:41 − Ressmann (Pusnik) |
| Zarrillo (Topatigh) − 50:39 | 5–1 |
| | 5–2 | 53:27 − Kromp (Searle) |

20 min
Penalties
16 min
33
Shots
22

=== Group B ===
| Pos | Team | Pld | W | D | L | GF | GA | GD | Pts | Qualification |
|---|---|---|---|---|---|---|---|---|---|---|
| 1 | Belarus | 3 | 2 | 1 | 0 | 14 | 4 | +10 | 5 | First Round |
| 2 | Germany | 3 | 2 | 0 | 1 | 7 | 9 | −2 | 4 | |
| 3 | France | 3 | 1 | 0 | 2 | 5 | 8 | −3 | 2 | |
| 4 | Japan | 3 | 0 | 1 | 2 | 5 | 10 | −5 | 1 | |

Source: Olympedia

| 7 February 1998; 20:00 | Germany | 3–1 (0–0, 1–0, 2–1) | Japan | The Big Hat, Nagano, Japan; Attendance: 9,861 |

Josef Heiß
Goalies
Shinichi Iwasaki
Referee:
(United States) Donald Adam
Linesmen:
(Czech Republic) Václav Český
(Slovakia) Rudolf Lauff

| Hecht (Wieland) – 37:03 | 1–0 |
| | 1–1 | 43:50 – Sugisawa (Otomo) |
| Kunce (Wieland) – 51:24 | 2–1 |
| Benda (MacKay) – 55:05 | 3–1 |

22 min
Penalties
16 min
33
Shots
21

| 7 February 1998; 20:00 | France | 0–4 (0–1, 0–1, 0–2) | Belarus | Aqua Wing Arena, Nagano, Japan; Attendance: 3,419 |

Cristobal Huet
Goalies
Andrey Mezin
Referee:
(United States) Brad Meier
Linesmen:
(Canada) Kenneth Sartison
(United States) Timothy Kotyra

| 0–1 | 15:06 – Karachun (Romanov) |
| 0–2 | 38:52 – Bekbulatov |
| 0–3 | 46:21 – Kalyuzhny (Karachun, Antonenko) |
| 0–4 | 53:10 – Skabelka (Andriyevsky) (PP) |

26 min
Penalties
14 min
18
Shots
36

| 9 February 1998; 14:00 | Germany | 2–8 (0–2, 2–3, 0–3) | Belarus | The Big Hat, Nagano, Japan; Attendance: 8,063 |

Klaus Merk
Goalies
Andrey Mezin
Aleksandr Shumidub
Referee:
(Finland) Pekka Haajanen
Linesmen:
(Sweden) Ulf Gerhard Rönnmark
(Finland) Janne Rautavuori

| | 0–1 | 8:23 – Antonenko (Stas) |
| | 0–2 | 14:51 – Salei (Khmyl) (PP) |
| Hegen (Bergen, MacKay) (PP) – 23:39 | 1–2 |
| | 1–3 | 28:05 – Andriyevsky (Matushkin, Romanov) (PP) |
| | 1–4 | 28:37 – Kovalyov (Roshchin, Lozhkin) |
| Bergen (Brandl) (PP) – 38:39 | 2–4 |
| | 2–5 | 39:49 – Skabelka (Bekbulatov) |
| | 2–6 | 43:38 – Galchenyuk (Alekseyev) |
| | 2–7 | 46:35 – Aliakseyev (Kovalyov) |
| | 2–8 | 57:17 – Yerkovich (Galchenyuk) (PP) |

14 min
Penalties
22 min
28
Shots
31

| 9 February 1998; 18:00 | Japan | 2–5 (2–1, 0–1, 0–3) | France | The Big Hat, Nagano, Japan; Attendance: 9,930 |

Dusty Imoo
Goalies
François Gravel
Referee:
(Germany) Gerhard Müller
Linesmen:
(Czech Republic) Václav Český
(Slovakia) Rudolf Lauff

| Fujita (Sakai, Kudo) – 7:36 | 1–0 |
| | 1–1 | 14:42 – Bozon (SH) |
| Kuwabara (Sugisawa, Yahata) (PP) – 15:32 | 2–1 |
| | 2–2 | 23:51 – Barin (Mortas, Ouellet) |
| | 2–3 | 57:05 – Pouget (Poudrier, Bozon) (PP) |
| | 2–4 | 59:08 – Bozon (Poudrier) (SH, EN) |
| | 2–5 | 59:37 – Poudrier (Lemoine) (SH, EN) |

18 min
Penalties
41 min
21
Shots
25

| 10 February 1998; 14:00 | Japan | 2–2 (1–1, 1–1, 0–0) | Belarus | The Big Hat, Nagano, Japan; Attendance: 3,659 |

Dusty Imoo
Goalies
Aleksandr Shumidub
Referee:
(United States) Donald Adam
Linesmen:
(United States) Timothy Kotyra
(Canada) Kenneth Sartison

| | 0–1 | 12:36 – Romanov (Andriyevsky, Skabelka) |
| Kabayama (Fujita, Sakai) (PP) – 19:02 | 1–1 |
| | 1–2 | 30:32 – Bekbulatov (Matushkin) |
| Kuwabara (Yahata, Sugisawa) (PP) – 34:23 | 2–2 |

16 min
Penalties
12 min
19
Shots
44

| 10 February 1998; 18:00 | France | 0–2 (0–0, 0–1, 0–1) | Germany | Aqua Wing Arena, Nagano, Japan; Attendance: 3,916 |

| François Gravel | Goalies | Olaf Kolzig | Referee: (Sweden) Bengt Andersson; Linesmen: (Russia) Alexander Poliakov (Japan) Hirokazu Takahashi |
| 0–1 / 27:46 – MacKay (Draisaitl, Lüdemann); 0–2 / 58:06 – Draisaitl (Krupp) | | | Referee: (Sweden) Bengt Andersson; Linesmen: (Russia) Alexander Poliakov (Japan) Hirokazu Takahashi |
| 12 min | Penalties | 16 min | Referee: (Sweden) Bengt Andersson; Linesmen: (Russia) Alexander Poliakov (Japan) Hirokazu Takahashi |
| 25 | Shots | 31 | Referee: (Sweden) Bengt Andersson; Linesmen: (Russia) Alexander Poliakov (Japan) Hirokazu Takahashi |

== Consolation round ==
=== 13th place match ===
| 12 February 1998; 12:00 | Japan | 4–3 SO (1–2, 1–0, 1–1) (OT 0–0) (SO: 1–0) | Austria | The Big Hat, Nagano, Japan; Attendance: 9,495 |

Dusty Imoo
Goalies
Reinhard Divis
Referee:
(United States) Brad Meier
Linesmen:
(Czech Republic) Václav Český
(Slovakia) Rudolf Lauff

| | 0–1 | 2:35 – Lavoie (Ulrich, Wheeldon) (PP) |
| Yahata (Yamanaka) (PP) – 9:22 | 1–1 |
| | 1–2 | 18:17 – Ressmann (Pusnik, Kalt) |
| Sugisawa (Yamanaka, Yahata) (PP) – 28:34 | 2–2 |
| | 2–3 | 43:04 – Lavoie (Ulrich) (PP) |
| Otomo – 46:35 | 3–3 |

Sugisawa
Yahata (miss)
Tsujiura (miss)
Fujita (miss)
Sakai (miss)
Sugisawa (miss)
Kabayama
Yahata
Shootout
(miss) Kromp
(miss) Kalt
Nasheim
(miss) Lavoie
(miss) Wheeldon
(miss) Kalt
Nasheim
(miss) Wheeldon
18 min
Penalties
36 min
40
Shots
30

=== 11th place match ===
| 12 February 1998; 16:00 | France | 5–1 (1–0, 0–0, 4–1) | Italy | The Big Hat, Nagano, Japan; Attendance: 8,854 |

Cristobal Huet
Goalies
Mike Rosati
Referee:
(Germany) Gerhard Müller
Linesmen:
(Germany) Thomas Schurr
(Japan) Hirokazu Takahashi

| Bozon (Dubois) – 9:39 | 1–0 |
| Bozon (Poudrier, Pouget) – 40:56 | 2–0 |
| Bozon (Pouget) – 47:31 | 3–0 |
| Briand (Bozon, Poudrier) – 50:03 (PP) | 4–0 |
| | 4–1 | 53:21 – Orlando (Topatigh, Bartolone) (PP) |
| Poudrier – 56:43 (PP) | 5–1 |

14 min
Penalties
18 min
22
Shots
31

=== 9th place match ===
| 12 February 1998; 20:00 | Germany | 4–2 (0–1, 1–1, 3–0) | Slovakia | The Big Hat, Nagano, Japan; Attendance: 8,670 |

Olaf Kolzig
Goalies
Igor Murín
Referee:
(United States) Donald Adam
Linesmen:
(Russia) Alexander Poliakov
(United States) Timothy Kotyra

| | 0–1 | 17:51 – Daňo |
| Draisaitl (Goldmann) (PP) – 21:30 | 1–1 |
| | 1–2 | 38:03 – Pardavý (Sekeráš) |
| Benda (Brüggemann, MacKay) – 42:51 | 2–2 |
| Benda (Krupp) – 46:59 | 3–2 |
| Lüdemann (Draisaitl) – 49:58 | 4–2 |

29 min
Penalties
29 min
19
Shots
33

== First round ==
=== Group C ===
| Pos | Team | Pld | W | D | L | GF | GA | GD | Pts | Qualification |
|---|---|---|---|---|---|---|---|---|---|---|
| 1 | Russia | 3 | 3 | 0 | 0 | 15 | 6 | +9 | 6 | Quarterfinals |
| 2 | Czech Republic | 3 | 2 | 0 | 1 | 12 | 4 | +8 | 4 | Quarterfinals |
| 3 | Finland | 3 | 1 | 0 | 2 | 11 | 9 | +2 | 2 | Quarterfinals |
| 4 | Kazakhstan | 3 | 0 | 0 | 3 | 6 | 25 | −19 | 0 | Quarterfinals |

Source: Olympedia

| 13 February 1998; 14:45 | Czech Republic | 3–0 (0–0, 1–0, 2–0) | Finland | Aqua Wing Arena, Nagano, Japan; Attendance: 5,050 |

Dominik Hašek
Goalies
Jarmo Myllys
Referee:
(Canada) Kerry Fraser
Linesmen:
(United States) Gord Broseker
(Sweden) Ulf Rönnmark

| Patera (Ručinský) (PP) – 29:09 | 1–0 |
| Reichel (Lang) – 44:54 | 2–0 |
| Růžička (Jágr) – 48:40 | 3–0 |

6 min
Penalties
6 min
29
Shots
17

| 13 February 1998; 18:45 | Russia | 9–2 (2–1, 5–0, 2–1) | Kazakhstan | Aqua Wing Arena, Nagano, Japan; Attendance: 3,752 |

Andrei Trefilov
Goalies
Vitali Yeremeyev
Alexander Shimin
Referee:
(United States) Don Adam
Linesmen:
(Czech Republic) Václav Český
(Canada) Ray Scapinello

| Fedorov (Kovalenko) – 1:30 | 1–0 |
| | 1–1 | 2:15 – Sagymbayev (Pchelyakov) |
| Yashin (Fedorov) – 8:15 | 2–1 |
| Yashin (Kasparaitis) – 20:55 | 3–1 |
| P. Bure (D. Mironov) – 27:34 | 4–1 |
| P. Bure – 32:01 | 5–1 |
| Kovalenko – 32:14 | 6–1 |
| Titov (Kamensky, Morozov) – 38:39 | 7–1 |
| Kovalenko (B. Mironov) – 45:09 | 8–1 |
| Zelepukin (Morozov) – 55:46 | 9–1 |
| | 9–2 | 57:40 – Y. Koreshkov (Shafranov, A. Koreshkov) |

8 min
Penalties
6 min
31
Shots
18

| 15 February 1998; 13:45 | Russia | 4–3 (1–2, 2–1, 1–0) | Finland | The Big Hat, Nagano, Japan; Attendance: 9,894 |

Andrei Trefilov
Goalies
Jarmo Myllys
Referee:
(Canada) Bill McCreary
Linesmen:
(United States) Gord Broseker
(Sweden) Ulf Rönnmark

| | 0–1 | 6:11 – Koivu (Lehtinen, Selänne) (PP) |
| | 0–2 | 7:04 – Lehtinen (Koivu, Selänne) (PP) |
| P. Bure (Fedorov, Kamensky) (PP) – 13:36 | 1–2 |
| | 1–3 | 28:24 – Lehtinen (Selänne) |
| Nemchinov (Gonchar, Kravchuk) – 29:31 | 2–3 |
| Yashin (Fedorov, Zhitnik) (PP) – 35:03 | 3–3 |
| Morozov (Zelepukin) – 56:43 | 4–3 |

24 min
Penalties
22 min
28
Shots
33

| 15 February 1998; 18:45 | Czech Republic | 8–2 (1–0, 3–2, 4–0) | Kazakhstan | The Big Hat, Nagano, Japan; Attendance: 9,975 |

Dominik Hašek
Goalies
Vitali Yeremeyev
Alexander Shimin
Referee:
(Finland) Pekka Haajanen
Linesmen:
(Russia) Alexander Poliakov
(Canada) Ray Scapinello

| Straka (Jágr) – 3:51 | 1–0 |
| Beránek (Moravec, Dopita) – 23:22 | 2–0 |
| | 2–1 | 27:13 – Kamentsev (Glovatsky, Antipin) (PP) |
| M. Ručinský – 32:02 | 3–1 |
| Růžička (Jágr) (PP) – 37:31 | 4–1 |
| | 4–2 | 39:09 – A. Koreshkov |
| Ručinský (Lang, Svoboda) – 41:00 | 5–2 |
| Patera (SH) – 49:42 | 6–2 |
| M. Procházka (PP) – 52:16 | 7–2 |
| Hamrlík (Straka) – 57:06 | 8–2 |

43 min
Penalties
41 min
45
Shots
23

| 16 February 1998; 15:45 | Finland | 8–2 (3–1, 1–0, 4–1) | Kazakhstan | Aqua Wing Arena, Nagano, Japan; Attendance: 5,544 |

Ari Sulander
Goalies
Vitali Yeremeyev
Alexander Shimin
Referee:
(United States) Mark Faucette
Linesmen:
(Czech Republic) Václav Český
(Canada) Gérard Gauthier

| | 0–1 | 4:25 – Antipin (PP) |
| Lumme (Selänne, Koivu) (PP) – 12:53 | 1–1 |
| Helminen (Kapanen, Peltonen) (PP) – 16:19 | 2–1 |
| Tikkanen (Kurri, Nieminen) – 17:09 | 3–1 |
| Numminen (Niinimaa, Koivu) (PP) – 36:26 | 4–1 |
| Lehtinen (Selänne) – 50:52 | 5–1 |
| Peltonen (SH) – 52:28 | 6–1 |
| Selänne (Niinimaa, Koivu) (PP) – 54:33 | 7–1 |
| | 7–2 | 56:43 – Nikitin (Trochshinsky) (PP) |
| Nieminen (Niinimaa, Kurri) (PP) – 59:54 | 8–2 |

24 min
Penalties
22 min
37
Shots
15

| 16 February 1998; 18:45 | Czech Republic | 1–2 (0–0, 1–0, 0–2) | Russia | The Big Hat, Nagano, Japan; Attendance: 9,847 |

Dominik Hašek
Goalies
Mikhail Shtalenkov
Referee:
(Canada) Kerry Fraser
Linesmen:
(United States) Kevin Collins
(Finland) Janne Rautavuori

| Reichel (Patera) (PP) – 31:53 | 1–0 |
| | 1–1 | 43:27 – V. Bure (Kravchuk, Gonchar) |
| | 1–2 | 43:37 – Zhamnov (Gusarov, D. Mironov) |

14 min
Penalties
6 min
24
Shots
31

=== Group D ===
| Pos | Team | Pld | W | D | L | GF | GA | GD | Pts | Qualification |
|---|---|---|---|---|---|---|---|---|---|---|
| 1 | Canada | 3 | 3 | 0 | 0 | 12 | 3 | +9 | 6 | Quarterfinals |
| 2 | Sweden | 3 | 2 | 0 | 1 | 11 | 7 | +4 | 4 | Quarterfinals |
| 3 | United States | 3 | 1 | 0 | 2 | 8 | 10 | −2 | 2 | Quarterfinals |
| 4 | Belarus | 3 | 0 | 0 | 3 | 4 | 15 | −11 | 0 | Quarterfinals |

Source: Olympedia

| 13 February 1998; 14:45 | Sweden | 4–2 (1–2, 2–0, 1–0) | United States | The Big Hat, Nagano, Japan; Attendance: 9,985 |

Tommy Salo
Goalies
Mike Richter
Referee:
(Canada) Bill McCreary
Linesmen:
(Canada) Gérard Gauthier
(Canada) Troy Sartison

| | 0–1 | 11:10 – Chelios (Guerin, Tkachuk) |
| Alfredsson (Forsberg) (PP) – 12:26 | 1–1 |
| | 1–2 | 12:50 – Modano (Guerin) |
| Kjellberg (Renberg, Samuelsson) – 21:50 | 2–2 |
| Alfredsson (Forsberg) – 31:33 | 3–2 |
| Sundin (Andersson) – 57:04 | 4–2 |

16 min
Penalties
20 min
20
Shots
31

| 13 February 1998; 18:45 | Canada | 5–0 (2–0, 2–0, 1–0) | Belarus | The Big Hat, Nagano, Japan; Attendance: 9,960 |

Patrick Roy
Goalies
Andrei Mezin
Referee:
(United States) Mark Faucette
Linesmen:
(United States) Kevin Collins
(Finland) Janne Rautavuori

| Fleury (Primeau) (SH) – 7:55 | 1–0 |
| Bourque (Brind'Amour, Corson) – 14:34 | 2–0 |
| MacInnis (Nieuwendyk) (PP) – 24:38 | 3–0 |
| Lindros (Bourque) – 37:44 | 4–0 |
| Lindros (Brind'Amour) – 52:57 | 5–0 |

10 min
Penalties
6 min
31
Shots
18

| 14 February 1998; 14:45 | United States | 5–2 (2–1, 1–0, 2–1) | Belarus | The Big Hat, Nagano, Japan; Attendance: 9,975 |

Mike Richter
Goalies
Andrei Mezin
Referee:
(Canada) Kerry Fraser
Linesmen:
(Canada) Gérard Gauthier
(Canada) Troy Sartison

| Chelios (LaFontaine) (PP) – 9:06 | 1–0 |
| LaFontaine (Leetch, K. Hatcher) (PP) – 10:31 | 2–0 |
| | 2–1 | 18:02 – Karachun (Lozhkin, Galchenyuk) |
| Leetch (LeClair, Hull) (PP) – 28:16 | 3–1 |
| | 3–2 | 40:27 – Pankov (Skabelka, Bekbulatov) |
| Hull (Weight, K. Hatcher) (PP) – 53:45 | 4–2 |
| Deadmarsh (Guerin, Roenick) – 58:14 | 5–2 |

14 min
Penalties
16 min
31
Shots
30

| 14 February 1998; 18:45 | Sweden | 2–3 (1–0, 0–3, 1–0) | Canada | The Big Hat, Nagano, Japan; Attendance: 9,945 |

Tommy Salo
Goalies
Patrick Roy
Referee:
(United States) Mark Faucette
Linesmen:
(United States) Kevin Collins
(Finland) Janne Rautavuori

| Lidström (Alfredsson, Renberg) (PP) – 15:27 | 1–0 |
| | 1–1 | 31:56 – Nieuwendyk (Blake, Lindros) |
| | 1–2 | 37:02 – MacInnis (Nieuwendyk) (PP) |
| | 1–3 | 39:53 – Blake (Nieuwendyk, Fleury) |
| Sundin (Lidström, Norström) – 49:31 | 2–3 |

14 min
Penalties
14 min
30
Shots
29

| 16 February 1998; 13:45 | Canada | 4–1 (1–0, 2–0, 1–1) | United States | The Big Hat, Nagano, Japan; Attendance: 10,076 |

Patrick Roy
Goalies
Mike Richter
Referee:
(Canada) Bill McCreary
Linesmen:
(United States) Gord Broseker
(Canada) Troy Sartison

| Zamuner (Gretzky, Sakic) – 16:30 | 1–0 |
| Primeau (Yzerman) (SH) – 33:37 | 2–0 |
| Sakic (Fleury) – 38:19 | 3–0 |
| Primeau (Recchi, Sakic) – 46:00 | 4–0 |
| | 4–1 | 54:04 – Hull (Weight) |

12 min
Penalties
6 min
25
Shots
31

| 16 February 1998; 18:45 | Sweden | 5–2 (2–0, 1–1, 2–1) | Belarus | Aqua Wing Arena, Nagano, Japan; Attendance: 4,235 |

Tommy Salo
Goalies
Andrei Mezin
Referee:
(Germany) Gerhard Müller
Linesmen:
(Russia) Alexander Poliakov
(Canada) Ray Scapinello

| Andersson (Sundström, Ragnarsson) – 10:06 | 1–0 |
| Dahlén (Sandström) – 11:22 | 2–0 |
| Sundström (Forsberg, Öhlund) – 30:36 | 3–0 |
| | 3–1 | 39:19 – Matushkin (Tsyplakov, Kovalev) (PP) |
| Sundin (Alfredsson) – 50:19 | 4–1 |
| | 4–2 | 53:44 – Tsyplakov (Romanov, Kovalev) (PP) |
| Renberg (Alfredsson, Forsberg) – 54:36 | 5–2 |

14 min
Penalties
8 min
38
Shots
23

== Final round ==
Quarterfinals
C1 | Russia | 4
D4 | Belarus | 1
D2 | Sweden | 1
C3 | Finland | 2
D1 | Canada | 4
C4 | Kazakhstan | 1
C2 | Czech Republic | 4
D3 | United States | 1

Semifinals
C1 | Russia | 7
C3 | Finland | 4
D1 | Canada | 1
C2 | Czech Republic | 2

Gold medal game
C1 | Russia | 0
C2 | Czech Republic | 1
Bronze medal game
D1 | Canada | 2
C3 | Finland | 3

=== Quarterfinals ===
| 18 February 1998; 14:45 | Czech Republic | 4–1 (0–1, 3–0, 1–0) | United States | The Big Hat, Nagano, Japan; Attendance: 9,822 |

Dominik Hašek
Goalies
Mike Richter
John Vanbiesbrouck
Referee:
(Canada) Bill McCreary
Linesmen:
(Russia) Alexander Poliakov
(Canada) Ray Scapinello

| | 0–1 | 16:12 – Modano (Amonte, Tkachuk) |
| Růžička (Jágr, Straka) – 28:21 | 1–1 |
| Jágr (Dopita) – 29:19 | 2–1 |
| Ručinský (Lang, Šmehlík) – 36:35 | 3–1 |
| Dopita – 59:21 | 4–1 |

6 min
Penalties
8 min
19
Shots
39

| 18 February 1998; 14:45 | Russia | 4–1 (1–0, 1–0, 2–1) | Belarus | Aqua Wing Arena, Nagano, Japan; Attendance: 4,628 |

Mikhail Shtalenkov
Goalies
Andrei Mezin
Referee:
(United States) Mark Faucette
Linesmen:
(United States) Gord Broseker
(Sweden) Ulf Rönnmark

| Kamensky (Yashin) – 19:00 | 1–0 |
| Kovalenko (Fedorov, Yashin) – 21:31 | 2–0 |
| P. Bure – 42:38 | 3–0 |
| Morozov (Zelepukin, Kasparaitis) – 43:19 | 4–0 |
| | 4–1 | 44:18 – Yerkovich (Khmyl, Roshchin) |

14 min
Penalties
10 min
35
Shots
26

| 18 February 1998; 18:45 | Canada | 4–1 (2–1, 2–0, 0–0) | Kazakhstan | The Big Hat, Nagano, Japan; Attendance: 9,602 |

Patrick Roy
Goalies
Vitali Yeremeyev
Referee:
(United States) Don Adam
Linesmen:
(United States) Kevin Collins
(Finland) Janne Rautavuori

| Nieuwendyk (Fleury, Roy) – 1:31 | 1–0 |
| Corson (Lindros) – 2:13 | 2–0 |
| | 2–1 | 3:46 – Shafranov (Koreshkov) |
| Shanahan (Gretzky, Bourque) – 36:29 | 3–1 |
| Yzerman (Gretzky) – 37:01 | 4–1 |

14 min
Penalties
12 min
37
Shots
17

| 18 February 1998; 18:45 | Sweden | 1–2 (0–0, 0–0, 1–2) | Finland | Aqua Wing Arena, Nagano, Japan; Attendance: 5,044 |

Tommy Salo
Goalies
Jarmo Myllys
Referee:
(Canada) Kerry Fraser
Linesmen:
(Czech Republic) Václav Český
(Canada) Gérard Gauthier

| | 0–1 | 44:12 – Selänne (Numminen) |
| | 0–2 | 52:43 – Selänne (Koivu, Lehtinen) (PP) |
| Forsberg – 59:48 | 1–2 |

12 min
Penalties
12 min
17
Shots
19

=== Semi-finals ===
| 20 February 1998; 14:45 | Canada | 1–2 SO (0–0, 0–0, 1–1) (OT 0–0) (SO: 0–1) | Czech Republic | The Big Hat, Nagano, Japan; Attendance: 9,854 |

| Patrick Roy | Goalies | Dominik Hašek | Referee: (Canada) Bill McCreary; Linesmen: (United States) Kevin Collins (Finland) Janne Rautavuori |
| / 0–1 / 49:46 – Šlégr (Patera); Linden (Lindros) – 58:57 / 1–1 | | | Referee: (Canada) Bill McCreary; Linesmen: (United States) Kevin Collins (Finland) Janne Rautavuori |
| Fleury (miss); Bourque (miss); Nieuwendyk (miss); Lindros (miss); Shanahan (miss) | Shootout | Reichel; (miss) Ručinský; (miss) Patera; (miss) Jágr | Referee: (Canada) Bill McCreary; Linesmen: (United States) Kevin Collins (Finland) Janne Rautavuori |
| 2 min | Penalties | 4 min | Referee: (Canada) Bill McCreary; Linesmen: (United States) Kevin Collins (Finland) Janne Rautavuori |
| 30 | Shots | 31 | Referee: (Canada) Bill McCreary; Linesmen: (United States) Kevin Collins (Finland) Janne Rautavuori |

| 20 February 1998; 18:45 | Russia | 7–4 (2–0, 2–3, 3–1) | Finland | The Big Hat, Nagano, Japan; Attendance: 9,640 |

Mikhail Shtalenkov
Goalies
Jarmo Myllys
Referee:
(Canada) Kerry Fraser
Linesmen:
(Canada) Gérard Gauthier
(Canada) Troy Sartison

| P. Bure (Zhamnov) (PP) – 9:51 | 1–0 |
| P. Bure (Mironov) – 17:28 | 2–0 |
| P. Bure – 20:59 | 3–0 |
| | 3–1 | 23:28 – Helminen (Lind) |
| | 3–2 | 24:59 – Rintanen (Kurri, Timonen) |
| | 3–3 | 34:07 – Selänne (Koivu, Kurri) (PP2) |
| Zhamnov (Zhitnik) (PP) – 37:26 | 4–3 |
| | 4–4 | 45:15 – Koivu (Selänne) |
| Kovalenko (Fedorov) – 46:33 | 5–4 |
| P. Bure – 55:58 | 6–4 |
| P. Bure (Yashin, Mironov) (EN) – 59:55 | 7–4 |

12 min
Penalties
6 min
21
Shots
31

=== Bronze medal game ===
| 21 February 1998; 15:15 | Canada | 2–3 (1–2, 1–0, 0–1) | Finland (bronze) | The Big Hat, Nagano, Japan; Attendance: 9,875 |

Patrick Roy
Goalies
Ari Sulander
Referee:
(Canada) Kerry Fraser
Linesmen:
(United States) Gord Broseker
(Russia) Alexander Poliakov

| | 0–1 | 03:33 – Kurri (Tikkanen, Nieminen) (PP) |
| Brind'Amour (Foote) – 16:50 | 1–1 |
| | 1–2 | 17:23 – Lehtinen (Koivu) |
| Shanahan (Gretzky, Recchi) (PP) – 22:47 | 2–2 |
| | 2–3 | 40:17 – Peltonen (Koivu) (PP) |

12 min
Penalties
12 min
34
Shots
15

=== Gold medal game ===
| 22 February 1998; 13:45 | (silver) Russia | 0–1 (0–0, 0–0, 0–1) | Czech Republic (gold) | The Big Hat, Nagano, Japan; Attendance: 10,010 |

| Mikhail Shtalenkov | Goalies | Dominik Hašek | Referee: (Canada) Bill McCreary; Linesmen: (Sweden) Ulf Rönnmark (Canada) Ray Scapinello |
| 0–1 / 48:08 − Svoboda (Patera, M. Procházka) | | | Referee: (Canada) Bill McCreary; Linesmen: (Sweden) Ulf Rönnmark (Canada) Ray Scapinello |
| 4 min | Penalties | 8 min | Referee: (Canada) Bill McCreary; Linesmen: (Sweden) Ulf Rönnmark (Canada) Ray Scapinello |
| 20 | Shots | 21 | Referee: (Canada) Bill McCreary; Linesmen: (Sweden) Ulf Rönnmark (Canada) Ray Scapinello |

== Statistics ==
=== Average age ===
Team Canada was the oldest team in the tournament, with an average age of 30 years. Team Kazakhstan was the youngest, averaging 26 years and 11 months. The gold medal-winning Czech Republic team averaged 27 years and 2 months. The tournament average was 28 years and 1 month.

=== Leading scorers ===
| Rank | Player | GP | G | A | Pts | PIM |
|---|---|---|---|---|---|---|
| 1 | Teemu Selänne (FIN) | 5 | 4 | 6 | 10 | 8 |
| 2 | Saku Koivu (FIN) | 6 | 2 | 8 | 10 | 4 |
| 3 | Pavel Bure (RUS) | 6 | 9 | 0 | 9 | 2 |
| 4 | Aleksandr Koreshkov (KAZ) | 7 | 3 | 6 | 9 | 2 |
| 5 | Philippe Bozon (FRA) | 4 | 5 | 2 | 7 | 4 |
| 6 | Konstantin Shafranov (KAZ) | 7 | 4 | 3 | 7 | 6 |
| 7 | Dominic Lavoie (AUT) | 4 | 5 | 1 | 6 | 8 |
| 8 | Jere Lehtinen (FIN) | 6 | 4 | 2 | 6 | 2 |
| 9 | Alexei Yashin (RUS) | 6 | 3 | 3 | 6 | 0 |
| 10 | Serge Poudrier (FRA) | 6 | 2 | 4 | 6 | 4 |
| 11 | Sergei Fedorov (RUS) | 6 | 1 | 5 | 6 | 8 |

== Medal-winning rosters ==
| Gold | Silver | Bronze |
|---|---|---|
| Czech Republic Josef Beránek; Jan Čaloun; Roman Čechmánek; Jiří Dopita; Roman Hamrlík; Dominik Hašek; Milan Hejduk; Milan Hnilička; Jaromír Jágr; František Kučera; Robert Lang; David Moravec; Pavel Patera; Libor Procházka; Martin Procházka; Robert Reichel; Martin Ručinský; Vladimír Růžička-C; Jiří Šlégr; Richard Šmehlík; Jaroslav Špaček; Martin Straka; Petr Svoboda | Russia Pavel Bure-C; Valeri Bure; Oleg Chevtsov; Sergei Fedorov; Sergei Gonchar; Alexei Gusarov; Valeri Kamensky; Darius Kasparaitis; Andrei Kovalenko; Igor Kravchuk; Sergei Krivokrasov; Boris Mironov; Dmitri Mironov; Alexei Morozov; Sergei Nemchinov; Mikhail Shtalenkov; German Titov; Andrei Trefilov; Alexei Yashin; Dmitri Yushkevich; Valeri Zelepukin; Alexei Zhitnik; Alexei Zhamnov | Finland Aki-Petteri Berg; Tuomas Grönman; Raimo Helminen; Sami Kapanen; Saku Koivu-C; Jari Kurri; Janne Laukkanen; Jere Lehtinen; Juha Lind; Jyrki Lumme; Jarmo Myllys; Mika Nieminen; Janne Niinimaa; Teppo Numminen; Ville Peltonen; Kimmo Rintanen; Teemu Selänne; Ari Sulander; Jukka Tammi; Esa Tikkanen; Kimmo Timonen; Antti Törmänen; Juha Ylönen |

- Gold – "Team members CZECH REPUBLIC". International Olympic Committee.
- Silver – "Team members Russia". International Olympic Committee.
- Bronze – "Team members Finland". International Olympic Committee.

== Controversy ==
Several of general manager Bobby Clarke's selections for Team Canada were controversial. 24-year-old Eric Lindros was named captain over longtime leaders such as Wayne Gretzky, Steve Yzerman and Ray Bourque (Clarke at the time was general manager of Lindros's NHL team, the Philadelphia Flyers). Rob Zamuner was a surprise pick for the team, while Mark Messier, Adam Oates, Ron Francis, Doug Gilmour and Scott Niedermayer were omitted. Japanese fans were disappointed when their adopted hero, Paul Kariya, a Canadian of Japanese heritage and one of Canada's best players, failed to make the Games due to a head injury sustained from a crosscheck by Gary Suter during regular season NHL play.

Memorably, during the shootout in their semifinal match against the Czech Republic, Canadian coach Marc Crawford opted to have defenceman Ray Bourque shoot in the shootout instead of high-scoring forwards Wayne Gretzky and Steve Yzerman. Hockey commentators alternatively criticized Crawford's decision (Bourque, like the other four Canadian shooters, failed to score) or praised it on the grounds that Bourque was one of hockey's most accurate shooters at the time and Gretzky had always been surprisingly mediocre on breakaways. Canada lost the shootout not scoring once.

Swedish player Ulf Samuelsson was discovered to have applied for American citizenship by reporters. Under Swedish law at the time, when one acquires a foreign passport, their citizenship is annulled. Samuelsson was ejected after having played the first game against Belarus, although Sweden kept their points from the win. The Czech National Olympic Committee felt that Sweden should lose the points and filed a protest with the Court of Arbitration for Sport, which was rejected.

The United States team, loaded with 17 NHL stars, was eliminated in the first game of the knockout round, and responded by trashing their rooms in the Olympic Village. Three apartments were vandalized, ten chairs were broken and three fire extinguishers were emptied. Six of those chairs and one fire extinguisher were thrown down five stories into a courtyard.

== Final rankings ==
| | Team |
|---|---|
| 1st place, gold medalist(s) | Czech Republic |
| 2nd place, silver medalist(s) | Russia |
| 3rd place, bronze medalist(s) | Finland |
| 4th | Canada |
| 5th | Sweden |
| 6th | United States |
| 7th | Belarus |
| 8th | Kazakhstan |
| 9th | Germany |
| 10th | Slovakia |
| 11th | France |
| 12th | Italy |
| 13th | Japan |
| 14th | Austria |

These standings are presented as the IIHF has them, however both the NHL and IOC maintain that all quarterfinal losers are ranked equal at 5th.

== See also ==
- Ice hockey at the Winter Olympics
- Ice hockey at the 1998 Winter Olympics – Women's tournament
