= Viktor Karachun =

Belarusian ice hockey player

Personal information
- Nationality: Belarusian
- Born: 12 August 1968; Minsk, Byelorussian SSR, Soviet Union
- Died: 11 August 2004 (aged 35); Heilbronn, Germany

Sport
- Sport: Ice hockey

Viktor Karachun (12 August 1968 – 11 August 2004) was a Belarusian ice hockey player. He competed in the men's tournament at the 1998 Winter Olympics.

== Career statistics ==
=== Regular season and playoffs ===
			Regular season					Playoffs
Season	Team	League	GP	G	A	Pts	PIM	GP	G	A	Pts	PIM
1985–86	Dinamo Minsk	URS.2	6	0	1	1	2	—	—	—	—	—
1986–87	Dinamo Minsk	URS.2	62	14	6	20	72	—	—	—	—	—
1987–88	Dinamo Minsk	URS.2	58	10	7	17	49	—	—	—	—	—
1988–89	Dinamo Minsk	URS	23	1	3	4	19	—	—	—	—	—
1989–90	Dinamo Minsk	URS	41	9	6	15	29	—	—	—	—	—
1990–91	Dinamo Minsk	URS	8	2	1	3	2	—	—	—	—	—
1991–92	Dinamo Minsk	CIS	28	1	1	2	11	—	—	—	—	—
1992–93	Dinamo Minsk	IHL	34	4	1	5	26	—	—	—	—	—
1992–93	Tivali Minsk	BLR	10	3	2	5	6	—	—	—	—	—
1993–94	SC Bietigheim–Bissingen	GER.4	14	22	12	34	34	—	—	—	—	—
1994–95	Podhale Nowy Targ	POL	7	5	3	8	6	—	—	—	—	—
1994–95	Stoczniowiec Gdańsk	POL	28	29	22	51	50	6	4	1	5	0
1995–96	EV Landsberg	GER.2	27	22	29	51	71	—	—	—	—	—
1997–98	Heilbronner EC	GER.2	2	4	0	4	4	—	—	—	—	—
1997–98	Augsburger Panther	DEL	34	7	10	17	42	4	1	0	1	0
1998–99	EHC Neuwied	GER.2	39	18	26	44	87	—	—	—	—	—
1999–2000	Revierlöwen Oberhausen	DEL	50	9	20	29	42	—	—	—	—	—
2000–01	EC Wilhelmshaven–Stickhausen	GER.2	42	32	38	70	129	4	0	1	1	10
2001–02	Heilbronner EC	GER.2	12	1	6	7	6	7	4	2	6	14
2002–03	Heilbronner EC	GER.2	49	24	30	54	71	3	1	1	2	16
2003–04	Heilbronner Falken	GER.2	39	21	21	42	85	—	—	—	—	—
URS.2 totals			126	24	14	38	123	—	—	—	—	—
URS/CIS totals			100	13	11	24	113	—	—	—	—	—
GER.2 totals			210	122	150	272	453	14	5	4	9	40

=== International ===
Year	Team	Event	GP	G	A	Pts	PIM
1997	Belarus	WC B	7	6	5	11	4
1998	Belarus	OG	7	2	1	3	8
1998	Belarus	WC	5	0	0	0	2
1999	Belarus	WC	6	1	3	4	4
2000	Belarus	WC	6	2	0	2	2
2001	Belarus	OGQ	3	1	1	2	0
2001	Belarus	WC	1	0	0	0	0
2002	Belarus	WC D1	5	1	5	6	10
Senior totals			40	13	15	28	32

"Viktor Karachun". Elite Prospects.
