= Alexander Galchenyuk =

Belarusian ice hockey player and coach

- Born: July 28, 1967 (age 59) Minsk, Byelorussian SSR, Soviet Union
- Height: 5 ft 11 in (180 cm)
- Weight: 195 lb (88 kg; 13 st 13 lb)
- Position: Centre
- Shot: Left
- Played for: Dinamo Minsk; Dynamo Moscow; Eisbären Berlin; Avangard Omsk; Asiago Hockey 1935; SKA Saint Petersburg; Mogilev; Neman Grodno; Madison Monsters; Michigan K-Wings; Milwaukee Admirals
- Current KHL coach: Amur Khabarovsk
- National team: Soviet Union and Belarus
- Playing career: 1986–2007

Alexander Nikolaevich Galchenyuk (born July 28, 1967) is a Belarusian professional ice hockey coach and former player. He is currently the head coach of Amur Khabarovsk in the Kontinental Hockey League (KHL). As a player, he participated in the 1998, 1999, 2000, and 2001 IIHF World Championships as a member of the Belarus men's national ice hockey team.

Galchenyuk was employed as an assistant coach with the Sarnia Sting of the Ontario Hockey League where he coached his son, Alex Galchenyuk, who was selected by the Montreal Canadiens third overall at the 2012 NHL entry draft.

== Professional career ==
Galchenyuk began playing top-level professional hockey with HC Dynamo Moscow during the 1985-86 season, staying with this team until the end of the 1991-92 season. He then travelled to the United States where he played the 1992–93 and 1993-94 seasons with the Milwaukee Admirals in the International Hockey League (IHL). Galchenyuk started the 1995-96 season in Germany playing elite level hockey in the Deutsche Eishockey Liga (DEL) with Eisbären Berlin, but returned to the United States before the season's end to join the Madison Monsters of the Colonial Hockey League (CoHL). Midway through the season, he was signed by the Michigan K-Wings of the IHL, where he remained for the following season and a half.

Galchenyuk returned to Europe for the 1998–99 season where he played nine more seasons in various the European leagues including the Russian Superleague where he played with Avangard Omsk and SKA Saint Petersburg. After spending 21 seasons as a professional ice hockey player, Galchenyuk retired following the 2006-07 season.

== International play ==
=== Soviet Union ===
At the age of 19, Galchenyuk was selected to represent the Soviet Union at the 1987 World Junior Ice Hockey Championships where he played 13 games and scored 5 points before the Soviet team was disqualified from the tournament following an on-ice brawl with the Canadian Team. He was also selected to play with the senior Soviet Union team that competed for the 1991 Canada Cup.

=== Belarus ===
Following the dissolution of the Soviet Union, Galchenyuk went on to represent Belarus in international tournaments. As a member of the Belarus men's national ice hockey team, Galchenyuk competed in four consecutive Ice Hockey World Championships, from 1998 to 2001, during which he scored a total of 26 points in 24 IIHF World Championship games. He also competed with Team Belarus at the 1998 Winter Olympics.

== Career statistics ==
=== Regular season and playoffs ===
			Regular season					Playoffs
Season	Team	League	GP	G	A	Pts	PIM	GP	G	A	Pts	PIM
1983–84	Dinamo Minsk	URS.2	11	1				—	—	—	—	—
1984–85	Dinamo Minsk	URS.2	20	5	1	6	6	—	—	—	—	—
1985–86	Dinamo Minsk	URS.2	28	12	7	19	26	—	—	—	—	—
1985–86	Dynamo Moscow	URS	11	1	1	2	4	—	—	—	—	—
1986–87	Dynamo Moscow	URS	29	0	2	2	10	—	—	—	—	—
1987–88	Dynamo Moscow	URS	45	7	3	10	14	—	—	—	—	—
1988–89	Dynamo Moscow	URS	26	3	3	6	26	—	—	—	—	—
1989–90	Dynamo Moscow	URS	34	6	3	9	20	—	—	—	—	—
1990–91	Dynamo Moscow	URS	44	11	16	27	32	—	—	—	—	—
1991–92	Dynamo Moscow	CIS	32	5	13	18	25	7	0	2	2	4
1991–92	Dynamo–2 Moscow	CIS.3	5	3	1	4	2	—	—	—	—	—
1992–93	Michigan K–Wings	IHL	44	13	33	46	22	1	0	0	0	0
1993–94	Milwaukee Admirals	IHL	33	12	24	36	20	3	1	1	2	0
1995–96	Eisbären Berlin	DEL	30	9	11	20	34	—	—	—	—	—
1995–96	Madison Monsters	CoHL	12	2	7	9	4	—	—	—	—	—
1996–97	Madison Monsters	CoHL	22	11	21	32	18	—	—	—	—	—
1996–97	Michigan K–Wings	IHL	52	11	17	28	24	4	2	1	3	0
1997–98	Michigan K–Wings	IHL	66	12	25	37	42	4	3	1	4	0
1998–99	Avangard Omsk	RSL	29	3	3	6	14	—	—	—	—	—
1998–99	SG Cortina	ITA	9	5	8	13	2	9	2	10	12	10
1999–2000	Asiago Hockey 1935	ITA	46	37	84	121	40	—	—	—	—	—
2000–01	Asiago Hockey 1935	ITA	31	11	34	45	10	16	5	13	18	14
2001–02	HC Sierre	SUI.2	6	0	2	2	4	—	—	—	—	—
2001–02	Milano Vipers	ITA	17	7	14	21	4	2	0	1	1	2
2002–03	Khimik Voskresensk	RUS.2	2	0	0	0	4	—	—	—	—	—
2002–03	Khimik–2 Voskresensk	RUS.3	5	2	5	7	2	—	—	—	—	—
2002–03	SKA St. Petersburg	RSL	26	1	5	6	26	—	—	—	—	—
2002–03	SKA–2 St. Petersburg	RUS.3	1	1	1	2	0	—	—	—	—	—
2003–04	Khimvolokno Mogilev	BLR	42	11	28	39	36	2	0	0	0	4
2003–04	Khimvolokno Mogilev	EEHL	29	5	19	24	70	—	—	—	—	—
2004–05	Khimvolokno Mogilev	BLR	43	16	39	55	58	8	3	3	6	6
2005–06	Dinamo Minsk	BLR	48	7	19	26	50	10	0	1	1	4
2006–07	Dinamo Minsk	BLR	28	4	6	10	10	—	—	—	—	—
2006–07	Neman Grodno	BLR	19	2	4	6	20	3	1	1	2	0
URS/CIS totals			221	33	41	74	131	7	0	2	2	4
IHL totals			195	48	99	147	108	12	6	3	9	0
BLR totals			180	40	96	136	174	23	4	5	9	14

=== International ===
Year	Team	Event	Results	GP	G	A	Pts	PIM
1985	Soviet Union	EJC	2nd place, silver medalist(s)	5	0	2	2	0
1986	Soviet Union	WJC	1st place, gold medalist(s)	7	1	2	3	4
1987	Soviet Union	WJC	DSQ	6	1	1	2	8
1991	Soviet Union	CC	5th	5	0	1	1	0
1998	Belarus	OG	7th	7	1	2	3	0
1998	Belarus	WC	8th	6	0	0	0	10
1999	Belarus	WC	9th	6	0	1	1	6
2000	Belarus	WC	9th	6	0	0	0	6
2001	Belarus	WC	14	6	1	2	3	4
2005	Belarus	OGQ	DNQ	3	0	1	1	0
Junior totals				18	2	5	7	12
Senior totals				39	2	7	9	26
