= Alexander Andrievsky =

Belarusian ice hockey player (born 1968)

- Born: August 10, 1968 (age 57) Minsk, Byelorussian SSR, USSR
- Height: 6 ft 5 in (196 cm)
- Weight: 212 lb (96 kg; 15 st 2 lb)
- Position: Right wing
- Shot: Right
- Played for: Dinamo Minsk; Dynamo Moscow; HC Fribourg-Gottéron; Chicago Blackhawks; HPK; HC Bolzano; Krefeld Pinguine; Revierlöwen Oberhausen
- National team: Soviet Union and Belarus
- NHL draft: 220th overall, 1991; Chicago Blackhawks
- Playing career: 1984–2005

Alexander Leonidovich Andrijevsky (Russian: Алекса́ндр Леони́дович Андрие́вский; born 10 August 1968) is a Belarusian former professional ice hockey player who played one game in the National Hockey League for the Chicago Blackhawks. The rest of his career, which lasted from 1984 to 2005, was mainly spent in European leagues. Internationally he played for the Belarusian national team at the 1998 and 2002 Winter Olympics, and seven World Championships. After his playing career he worked as a coach, including serving as the head coach for Admiral Vladivostok of the Kontinental Hockey League (KHL) for several seasons between 2015 and 2021. He is currently the head coach for Amur Khabarovsk of the Kontinental Hockey League (KHL).

== Playing career ==
Andrijevsky spent the first six seasons of his career with his hometown team Dinamo Minsk between 1984 and 1990. In 1991, he moved to Dynamo Moscow. 1991 was also the year Andrijevski was drafted by the Chicago Blackhawks, who selected him 220th overall in the 10th round. After one more season with Dynamo, Andrijevsky moved to North America, signing with the Blackhawks. For the 1992–93 season, he was assigned to the Indianapolis Ice of the International Hockey League before being called up by the Blackhawks for his only NHL game.

The next season, Andrijevsky played just four games for Indianapolis before moving to the Kalamazoo Wings in the same league. It would be his final year in North America as he moved to the SM-liiga in Finland, joining HPK where he spent four seasons. He then split the 1998–99 season playing in Italian Hockey League - Serie A in Italy for HC Bolzano and in the Deutsche Eishockey Liga in Germany for the Krefeld Pinguine. Following a spell in the 2nd Bundesliga for EHC Neuwied, He returned to the DEL with Revierlöwen Oberhausen for two seasons.

Andrijevsky returned to Russia in 2001 with Khimik Voskresensk of the Vysshaya Hokkeinaya Liga, the country's second-tier league. He later returned to the 2nd Bundesliga with EHC Freiburg before returning to Belarus with HK Gomel and a return to Dinamo Minsk to finish his career.

== International career ==
Andrijevsky was a member of the Belarus national team and played with the team in the 1998 and 2002 Winter Olympics. He also represented the team in four Ice Hockey World Championships.

== Career statistics ==
=== Regular season and playoffs ===
			Regular season					Playoffs
Season	Team	League	GP	G	A	Pts	PIM	GP	G	A	Pts	PIM
1984–85	Dinamo Minsk	USSR-2	3	0	0	0	0	—	—	—	—	—
1985–86	Dinamo Minsk	USSR-2	11	3	4	7	4	—	—	—	—	—
1986–87	Dinamo Minsk	USSR-2	38	3	5	8	39	—	—	—	—	—
1987–88	Dinamo Minsk	USSR-2	50	2	5	7	20	—	—	—	—	—
1988–89	Dinamo Minsk	USSR	7	1	1	2	2	—	—	—	—	—
1988–89	Progress Grodno	USSR-3	17	12	1	13	10	—	—	—	—	—
1989–90	Dinamo Minsk	USSR	47	16	12	28	32	—	—	—	—	—
1990–91	Dynamo Moscow	USSR	44	9	8	17	28	—	—	—	—	—
1991–92	Dynamo Moscow	CIS	31	9	8	17	14	7	2	1	3	8
1991–92	Dynamo–2 Moscow	CIS-3	3	5	1	6	0	—	—	—	—	—
1991–92	HC Fribourg–Gottéron	NDA	1	0	0	0	0	—	—	—	—	—
1992–93	Tivali Minsk	BLR	11	5	2	7	14	—	—	—	—	—
1992–93	Chicago Blackhawks	NHL	1	0	0	0	0	—	—	—	—	—
1992–93	Indianapolis Ice	IHL	66	26	25	51	59	4	2	3	5	10
1993–94	Indianapolis Ice	IHL	4	0	1	1	2	—	—	—	—	—
1993–94	Kalamazoo Wings	IHL	57	6	22	28	58	1	0	0	0	2
1994–95	HPK	SM-l	17	8	9	17	18	—	—	—	—	—
1994–95	Tivali Minsk	RUS	4	1	1	2	4	—	—	—	—	—
1994–95	Tivali Minsk	BLR	10	11	7	18	20	—	—	—	—	—
1995–96	HPK	SM-l	43	18	15	33	75	9	7	1	8	4
1996–97	HPK	SM-l	42	17	28	45	26	10	2	4	6	2
1997–98	HPK	SM-l	25	7	9	16	22	—	—	—	—	—
1998–99	HC Bolzano	ITA	2	0	0	0	4	—	—	—	—	—
1998–99	HC Bolzano	ALP	35	23	14	37	16	—	—	—	—	—
1998–99	Krefeld Pinguine	DEL	13	5	4	9	8	4	0	1	1	6
1999–00	EHC Neuwied	GER-2	17	10	10	20	12	—	—	—	—	—
1999–00	Revierlöwen Oberhausen	DEL	31	13	18	31	40	—	—	—	—	—
2000–01	Revierlöwen Oberhausen	DEL	56	11	13	24	28	3	0	0	0	0
2001–02	Khimik Voskresensk	RUS-2	35	7	18	25	22	14	7	7	14	8
2002–03	Khimik Voskresensk	RUS-2	16	2	5	7	34	—	—	—	—	—
2002–03	EHC Freiburg	GER-2	15	9	4	13	4	11	2	1	3	31
2003–04	HK Gomel	BLR	32	14	14	28	16	9	3	1	4	0
2004–05	Dinamo Minsk	BLR	40	8	15	23	46	—	—	—	—	—
USSR/CIS totals			129	34	29	63	74	7	2	1	3	8
SM-l totals			127	50	61	111	141	19	9	5	14	6
NHL totals			1	0	0	0	0	—	—	—	—	—

=== International ===
Year	Team	Event	GP	G	A	Pts	PIM
1986	Soviet Union	EJC-B	5	0	2	2	0
1995	Belarus	WC-C	4	1	1	2	6
1996	Belarus	WC-B	7	4	6	10	8
1997	Belarus	WC-B	7	5	7	12	8
1998	Belarus	OLY	6	1	2	3	8
1998	Belarus	WC	6	1	3	4	12
1999	Belarus	WC	6	2	0	2	2
2000	Belarus	WC	3	1	2	3	2
2001	Belarus	WC	6	1	1	2	6
2002	Belarus	OLY	9	0	0	0	4
Junior totals			5	0	2	2	0
Senior totals			54	16	22	38	56
