= Igor Matushkin =

Belarusian ice hockey player

Personal information
- Nationality: Belarusian
- Born: 27 January 1965 (age 60); Chelyabinsk, Russia

Sport
- Sport: Ice hockey

Igor Matushkin (born 27 January 1965) is a Belarusian ice hockey player. He competed in the men's tournaments at the 1998 Winter Olympics and the 2002 Winter Olympics.

== Career statistics ==
=== Regular season and playoffs ===
			Regular season					Playoffs
Season	Team	League	GP	G	A	Pts	PIM	GP	G	A	Pts	PIM
1981–82	Metallurg Chelyabinsk	URS.3	4	0	0	0	0	—	—	—	—	—
1982–83	Metallurg Chelyabinsk	URS.3	44	4	3	7	24	—	—	—	—	—
1983–84	Metallurg Chelyabinsk	URS.3	52	17	6	23	28	—	—	—	—	—
1984–85	Traktor Chelyabinsk	URS	10	2	0	2	2	—	—	—	—	—
1984–85	Metallurg Chelyabinsk	URS.3	40	7	9	16	14	—	—	—	—	—
1985–86	Traktor Chelyabinsk	URS	40	2	2	4	23	—	—	—	—	—
1986–87	Traktor Chelyabinsk	URS	40	9	4	13	44	—	—	—	—	—
1987–88	Traktor Chelyabinsk	URS	43	10	13	23	24	—	—	—	—	—
1988–89	Traktor Chelyabinsk	URS	41	2	2	4	25	—	—	—	—	—
1989–90	Traktor Chelyabinsk	URS	30	5	5	10	10	—	—	—	—	—
1990–91	Dinamo Minsk	URS	28	2	2	4	12	—	—	—	—	—
1991–92	Dinamo Minsk	CIS	30	5	8	13	12	—	—	—	—	—
1992–93	Dinamo Minsk	IHL	41	1	3	4	22	—	—	—	—	—
1992–93	Tivali Minsk	BLR	9	5	2	7	4	—	—	—	—	—
1993–94	Bodens IK	SWE.2	36	10	22	32	48	9	2	2	4	8
1994–95	Bodens IK	SWE.2	36	7	22	29	24	10	0	2	2	8
1995–96	Team Kiruna IF	SWE.2	31	9	6	15	28	2	1	1	2	2
1996–97	Team Kiruna IF	SWE.2	31	5	11	16	10	5	1	1	2	2
1997–98	Bodens IK	SWE.2	24	10	27	37	24	4	1	1	2	2
1998–99	Luleå HF	SEL	50	2	6	8	57	9	0	3	3	8
1999–2000	Bodens IK	Allsv	46	11	17	28	42	—	—	—	—	—
2000–01	IF Björklöven	SEL	22	2	4	6	14	—	—	—	—	—
2000–01	Revierlöwen Oberhausen	DEL	14	0	6	6	8	3	0	0	0	0
2001–02	Timrå IK	SEL	13	0	1	1	6	—	—	—	—	—
2001–02	Skellefteå AIK	Allsv	25	5	10	15	12	6	0	3	3	8
2002–03	Skellefteå AIK	Allsv	10	5	3	8	6	—	—	—	—	—
2002–03	Mechel Chelyabinsk	RSL	31	2	4	6	28	—	—	—	—	—
2003–04	Piteå HC	Allsv	46	16	14	30	71	3	0	1	1	4
2004–05	Tegs SK	Allsv	29	8	17	25	24	—	—	—	—	—
2004–05	Mechel Chelyabinsk	RUS.2	6	1	0	1	4	3	0	0	0	0
2008–09	Piteå HC	SWE.3	3	0	0	0	0	5	0	1	1	10
2008–09	Vännäs HC	SWE.4	2	0	3	3	2	—	—	—	—	—
URS/CIS totals			262	37	36	73	152	—	—	—	—	—
SWE.2/Allsv totals			311	86	149	235	289	34	5	10	15	24

=== International ===
Year	Team	Event	GP	G	A	Pts	PIM
1996	Belarus	WC B	7	0	3	3	4
1997	Belarus	WC B	7	0	4	4	0
1998	Belarus	OG	7	1	2	3	4
1998	Belarus	WC	6	1	4	5	2
1999	Belarus	WC	6	0	0	0	2
2000	Belarus	WC	6	0	1	1	4
2001	Belarus	OGQ	3	0	1	1	4
2002	Belarus	OG	9	0	1	1	0
Senior totals			51	2	16	18	20

"Igor Matushkin". Elite Prospects.
