= Mark MacKay =

German ice hockey player (born 1964)

Personal information
- Nationality: German
- Born: 28 May 1964 (age 61); Brandon, Manitoba, Canada

Sport
- Sport: Ice hockey

Mark MacKay (born 28 May 1964) is a German ice hockey player. He competed in the men's tournaments at the 1998 Winter Olympics and the 2002 Winter Olympics.

== Career statistics ==
=== Regular season and playoffs ===
			Regular season					Playoffs
Season	Team	League	GP	G	A	Pts	PIM	GP	G	A	Pts	PIM
1980–81	St. Boniface Saints	MJHL	2	0	1	1	0	—	—	—	—	—
1981–82	St. Boniface Saints	MJHL	45	13	25	38	66	—	—	—	—	—
1982–83	University of Manitoba	CWUAA	—	—	—	—	—	—	—	—	—	—
1983–84	University of Manitoba	CWUAA	24	19	22	41	78	—	—	—	—	—
1984–85	Moose Jaw Warriors	WHL	71	66	74	140	25	—	—	—	—	—
1985–86	Neusser SC	FRG.3	40	76	75	151	—	—	—	—	—	—
1986–87	Neusser SC	FRG.2	42	56	41	97	4	—	—	—	—	—
1987–88	Neusser SC	FRG.2	34	24	21	45	14	—	—	—	—	—
1990–91	Grefrather EC	GER.2	32	38	37	75	23	—	—	—	—	—
1994–95	ETC Timmendorfer Strand	GER.2	47	71	84	155	24	—	—	—	—	—
1995–96	SERC Wild Wings	DEL	46	30	36	66	40	2	0	2	2	0
1996–97	SERC Wild Wings	DEL	48	23	39	62	22	—	—	—	—	—
1997–98	SERC Wild Wings	DEL	45	19	37	56	24	8	6	7	13	6
1998–99	SERC Wild Wings	DEL	52	24	33	57	24	—	—	—	—	—
1999–2000	SERC Wild Wings	DEL	55	18	32	50	32	—	—	—	—	—
2000–01	SERC Wild Wings	DEL	60	10	22	32	24	—	—	—	—	—
2001–02	SERC Wild Wings	DEL	59	16	20	36	34	—	—	—	—	—
FRG.2/GER.2 totals			155	189	183	372	65	—	—	—	—	—
DEL totals			365	140	219	359	200	10	6	9	15	6

=== International ===
Year	Team	Event	GP	G	A	Pts	PIM
1996	Germany	WC	6	1	1	2	4
1996	Germany	WCH	4	1	3	4	2
1997	Germany	OGQ	3	0	0	0	2
1997	Germany	WC	8	0	0	0	6
1998	Germany	OG	4	1	2	3	6
1998	Germany	WC	6	2	2	4	4
1999	Germany	WC B	7	1	5	6	2
2000	Germany	OGQ	3	0	4	4	2
2000	Germany	WC B	1	0	2	2	0
2001	Germany	OGQ	3	0	0	0	0
2001	Germany	WC	1	0	0	0	2
2002	Germany	OG	7	0	3	3	2
Senior totals			53	6	22	28	32

"Mark MacKay". Elite Prospects.

== Awards ==
- WHL East Second All-Star Team – 1985
