= Mikhail Borodulin =

Kazakh ice hockey player (1967–2003)

- Born: July 8, 1967 Ust-Kamenogorsk, Kazakh SSR, Soviet Union
- Died: December 22, 2003 (aged 36) Magnitogorsk, Russia
- Height: 6 ft 2 in (188 cm)
- Weight: 192 lb (87 kg; 13 st 10 lb)
- Position: Right wing
- Shot: Left
- Played for: Metallurg Magnitogorsk; Torpedo Ust-Kamenogorsk
- National team: Kazakhstan
- NHL draft: Undrafted
- Playing career: 1983–1999

Mikhail Ilyich Borodulin (Russian: Михаил Ильич Бородулин; 8 July 1967 — 22 December 2003) was a Kazakhstani professional ice hockey player. He played for Metallurg Magnitogorsk and Torpedo Ust-Kamenogorsk during his playing career. Borodulin also played for the Kazakhstan national team at the 1998 Winter Olympics and the 1998 World Championship. He died of cancer in 2003.

== Career statistics ==
=== Regular season and playoffs ===
| | | | Regular season | | | | | Playoffs |
| Season | Team | League | GP | G | A | Pts | PIM | GP | G | A | Pts | PIM |
|---|---|---|---|---|---|---|---|---|---|---|---|---|
| 1983–84 | Torpedo Ust–Kamenogorsk | URS.2 | 14 | 0 | | | | — | — | — | — | — |
| 1984–85 | Torpedo Ust–Kamenogorsk | URS.2 | 6 | 0 | 0 | 0 | 8 | — | — | — | — | — |
| 1985–86 | Torpedo Ust–Kamenogorsk | URS.2 | 18 | 0 | 0 | 0 | 10 | — | — | — | — | — |
| 1986–87 | SKA Sverdlovsk | URS.2 | 59 | 1 | 3 | 4 | 42 | — | — | — | — | — |
| 1988–89 | Metallurg Magnitogorsk | URS.3 | 29 | 7 | 3 | 10 | 32 | — | — | — | — | — |
| 1988–89 | Torpedo Ust–Kamenogorsk | URS.2 | 30 | 10 | 6 | 16 | 30 | — | — | — | — | — |
| 1989–90 | Torpedo Ust–Kamenogorsk | URS | 30 | 4 | 5 | 9 | 22 | — | — | — | — | — |
| 1990–91 | Torpedo Ust–Kamenogorsk | URS | 44 | 6 | 4 | 10 | 75 | — | — | — | — | — |
| 1991–92 | Torpedo Ust–Kamenogorsk | CIS | 31 | 11 | 4 | 15 | 36 | 3 | 0 | 0 | 0 | 2 |
| 1993–94 | Torpedo Ust–Kamenogorsk | IHL | 39 | 19 | 13 | 32 | 32 | — | — | — | — | — |
| 1994–95 | Metallurg Magnitogorsk | IHL | 43 | 16 | 17 | 33 | 60 | 6 | 0 | 1 | 1 | 6 |
| 1995–96 | Metallurg Magnitogorsk | IHL | 50 | 12 | 12 | 24 | 34 | 10 | 3 | 2 | 5 | 10 |
| 1995–96 | Metallurg–2 Magnitogorsk | RUS.2 | 1 | 0 | 0 | 0 | 0 | — | — | — | — | — |
| 1996–97 | Metallurg Magnitogorsk | RSL | 33 | 6 | 6 | 12 | 36 | 11 | 0 | 3 | 3 | 37 |
| 1996–97 | Metallurg–2 Magnitogorsk | RUS.3 | 1 | 0 | 0 | 0 | 0 | — | — | — | — | — |
| 1997–98 | Metallurg Magnitogorsk | RSL | 45 | 8 | 11 | 19 | 46 | 10 | 1 | 0 | 1 | 10 |
| 1998–99 | Metallurg Magnitogorsk | RSL | 41 | 11 | 10 | 21 | 69 | 16 | 2 | 8 | 10 | 12 |
| 1999–2000 | Metallurg Magnitogorsk | RSL | 9 | 0 | 2 | 2 | 6 | — | — | — | — | — |
| URS/CIS totals | | | 105 | 21 | 13 | 34 | 133 | 3 | 0 | 0 | 0 | 2 |
| IHL totals | | | 122 | 47 | 42 | 89 | 124 | 16 | 3 | 3 | 6 | 16 |
| RSL totals | | | 138 | 25 | 29 | 54 | 159 | 37 | 3 | 11 | 14 | 49 |

=== International ===
| Year | Team | Event | GP | G | A | Pts | PIM |
|---|---|---|---|---|---|---|---|
| 1994 | Kazakhstan | WC C | 6 | 6 | 2 | 8 | 0 |
| 1997 | Kazakhstan | WC B | 7 | 1 | 5 | 6 | 27 |
| 1998 | Kazakhstan | OG | 7 | 3 | 0 | 3 | 8 |
| 1998 | Kazakhstan | WC | 3 | 1 | 0 | 1 | 6 |
| Senior totals | | | 23 | 11 | 7 | 18 | 41 |
