= Igor Murín =

Slovak ice hockey player

Personal information
- Nationality: Slovak
- Born: 1 March 1973 (age 53) Trenčín, Czechoslovakia

Sport
- Sport: Ice hockey

Igor Murín (born 1 March 1973) is a Slovak ice hockey player. He competed in the men's tournament at the 1998 Winter Olympics. Now he is referee at OBFZ Trenčín
