= Vlastimil Plavucha =

Slovak ice hockey player

- Born: November 6, 1968 (age 56); Banská Bystrica, Czechoslovakia
- Height: 6 ft 0 in (183 cm)
- Weight: 181 lb (82 kg; 12 st 13 lb)
- Position: Right Wing
- Shot: Left
- Played for: HC Košice; HKM Zvolen; SC Langnau; HC Oceláři Třinec; HC '05 Banská Bystrica
- National team: Slovakia
- NHL draft: Undrafted
- Playing career: 1990–2007

Vlastimil Plavucha (born 6 November 1968) is a Slovak ice hockey player. He competed in the men's tournaments at the 1994 Winter Olympics and the 1998 Winter Olympics.

== Career statistics ==
=== Regular season and playoffs ===
Bold indicates led league

			Regular season					Playoffs
Season	Team	League	GP	G	A	Pts	PIM	GP	G	A	Pts	PIM
1990–91	HC VSŽ Košice	TCH	43	20	8	28	18	4	2	1	3	0
1991–92	HC VSŽ Košice	TCH	32	16	10	26	—	—	—	—	—	—
1992–93	HC Košice	TCH	46	25	19	44	—	—	—	—	—	—
1993–94	HC Košice	SVK	45	30	14	44	—	—	—	—	—	—
1994–95	HC Košice	SVK	36	**35**	18	53	24	—	—	—	—	—
1995–96	HC Košice	SVK	47	**34**	**36**	**70**	89	—	—	—	—	—
1996–97	HC Košice	SVK	52	33	41	74	58	—	—	—	—	—
1997–98	HC Košice	SVK	46	**37**	25	**62**	97	—	—	—	—	—
1998–99	HKm Zvolen	SVK	28	7	12	19	18	—	—	—	—	—
1999–2000	HKm Zvolen	SVK	54	**43**	29	**72**	76	—	—	—	—	—
2000–01	SC Langnau	NLA	26	12	9	21	16	—	—	—	—	—
2000–01	HC Oceláři Třinec	ELH	4	2	1	3	4	—	—	—	—	—
2001–02	HKm Zvolen	SVK	25	11	11	22	52	—	—	—	—	—
2004–05	HKm Zvolen	SVK	46	16	13	29	42	17	4	5	9	53
2005–06	HKm Zvolen	SVK	26	16	11	27	65	4	1	2	3	14
2005–06	HC ’05 Banská Bystrica	SVK.2	1	2	1	3	0	—	—	—	—	—
2006–07	HC ’05 Banská Bystrica	SVK.2	26	14	11	25	42	—	—	—	—	—
TCH totals			121	61	37	98	—	4	2	1	3	0
SVK totals			405	262	210	472	521	21	5	7	12	67

=== International ===
Year	Team	Event	GP	G	A	Pts	PIM
1994	Slovakia	OG	5	0	0	0	0
1994	Slovakia	WC C	6	3	3	6	6
1995	Slovakia	WC B	7	6	0	6	0
1996	Slovakia	WC	5	2	0	2	0
1996	Slovakia	WCH	3	0	2	2	0
1997	Slovakia	WC	8	0	0	0	4
1998	Slovakia	OG	4	4	0	4	2
2000	Slovakia	WC	9	4	2	6	4
Senior totals			47	19	7	26	16

"Vlastimil Plavucha". Elite Prospects.
