= Andrei Sokolov (ice hockey) =

Kazakhstani ice hockey player

- Born: January 22, 1968 (age 57); Ust-Kamenogorsk, Kazakh SSR, Soviet Union
- Height: 6 ft 0 in (183 cm)
- Weight: 176 lb (80 kg; 12 st 8 lb)
- Position: Defence
- Shot: Left
- Played for: Metallurg Magnitogorsk; Detroit Falcons; Torpedo Ust-Kamenogorsk; SKA Novosibirsk
- National team: Kazakhstan
- Playing career: 1986–2005

Andrei Pavlovich Sokolov (Russian: Андрей Павлович Соколов); born 22 January 1968) is a Kazakhstani retired ice hockey player.

== Career ==
During his career, Sokolov played for several teams in Russia and Kazakhstan. Sokolov also played for the Kazakhstani national team at the 1998 Winter Olympic Games and multiple Ice Hockey World Championships.

== Career statistics ==
=== Regular season and playoffs ===
			Regular season					Playoffs
Season	Team	League	GP	G	A	Pts	PIM	GP	G	A	Pts	PIM
1986–87	Stroitel Temirtau	URS.3	10	0	0	0		—	—	—	—	—
1987–88	Torpedo Ust–Kamenogorsk	URS	22	0	1	1	14	—	—	—	—	—
1988–89	SKA Novosibirsk	URS.2	65	5	2	7	75	—	—	—	—	—
1989–90	Torpedo Ust–Kamenogorsk	URS	25	0	2	2	30	—	—	—	—	—
1990–91	Torpedo Ust–Kamenogorsk	URS	33	3	0	3	56	—	—	—	—	—
1991–92	Torpedo Ust–Kamenogorsk	CIS	29	4	3	7	24	2	0	0	0	0
1992–93	Torpedo Ust–Kamenogorsk	IHL	38	4	6	10	40	1	0	1	1	0
1993–94	Torpedo Ust–Kamenogorsk	IHL	29	3	6	9	34	—	—	—	—	—
1993–94	Detroit Falcons	CoHL	3	0	1	1	5	—	—	—	—	—
1994–95	Metallurg Magnitogorsk	IHL	48	4	13	17	46	6	0	1	1	12
1995–96	Metallurg Magnitogorsk	IHL	45	5	3	8	28	10	1	0	1	10
1995–96	Metallurg–2 Magnitogorsk	RUS.2	1	0	1	1	2	—	—	—	—	—
1996–97	Metallurg Magnitogorsk	RSL	9	2	3	5	16	11	1	1	2	10
1997–98	Metallurg Magnitogorsk	RSL	45	4	23	27	65	6	0	1	1	6
1998–99	Metallurg Magnitogorsk	RSL	35	4	14	18	22	16	1	7	8	18
1999–2000	Metallurg Magnitogorsk	RSL	22	5	5	10	26	11	0	2	2	12
2000–01	Metallurg Magnitogorsk	RSL	31	1	11	12	34	8	0	4	4	6
2001–02	Metallurg Magnitogorsk	RSL	51	3	18	21	28	9	0	0	0	8
2002–03	Metallurg Magnitogorsk	RSL	37	2	3	5	34	2	0	0	0	2
2003–04	Metallurg Magnitogorsk	RSL	50	4	11	15	68	13	2	4	6	10
2004–05	Metallurg Magnitogorsk	RSL	40	2	11	13	12	2	0	0	0	2
URS/CIS totals			109	7	6	13	124	2	0	0	0	0
IHL totals			160	16	28	44	148	17	1	2	3	22
RSL totals			320	27	99	126	305	78	4	19	23	74

=== International ===
Year	Team	Event	GP	G	A	Pts	PIM
1992	Kazakhstan	WC C Q	2	0	0	0	0
1993	Kazakhstan	WC C	7	3	3	6	12
1994	Kazakhstan	WC C	6	1	1	2	20
1998	Kazakhstan	OG	7	1	1	2	4
1998	Kazakhstan	WC	1	0	0	0	0
2003	Kazakhstan	WC D1	4	0	5	5	2
2005	Kazakhstan	WC	6	0	0	0	12
Senior totals			33	5	10	15	50
