= Igor Zemlyanoy =

Kazakhstani ice hockey player

- Born: May 26, 1967 (age 57); Ust-Kamenogorsk, Kazakh SSR, Soviet Union
- Height: 5 ft 9 in (175 cm)
- Weight: 174 lb (79 kg; 12 st 6 lb)
- Position: Defence
- Shot: Left
- Played for: Avangard Omsk; Kazzinc-Torpedo; Metallurg Magnitogorsk; SKA MVO Kalinin
- National team: Kazakhstan
- Playing career: 1983–2004

Igor Stepanovich Zemlyanoy (Russian: Игорь Степанович Земляной); born 26 May 1967) is a Kazakhstani retired ice hockey player. During his career he played for several teams in both Russia and Kazakhstan. Zemlyanoy also played for the Kazakhstani national team at the 1998 Winter Olympic Games and multiple World Championships.

== Career statistics ==
=== Regular season and playoffs ===
			Regular season					Playoffs
Season	Team	League	GP	G	A	Pts	PIM	GP	G	A	Pts	PIM
1983–84	Torpedo Ust-Kamenogorsk	URS.2	3	0				—	—	—	—	—
1984–85	Torpedo Ust-Kamenogorsk	URS.2	5	0	0	0	4	—	—	—	—	—
1985–86	Torpedo Ust-Kamenogorsk	URS.2	55	3	3	6	34	—	—	—	—	—
1986–87	Torpedo Ust-Kamenogorsk	URS.2	65	6	5	11	24	—	—	—	—	—
1987–88	SKA MVO Kalinin	URS.2	72	10	7	17	76	—	—	—	—	—
1988–89	SKA MVO Kalinin	URS.2	55	9	11	20	42	—	—	—	—	—
1989–90	Torpedo Ust-Kamenogorsk	URS	29	1	2	3	10	—	—	—	—	—
1990–91	Torpedo Ust-Kamenogorsk	URS	41	4	3	7	16	—	—	—	—	—
1991–92	Torpedo Ust-Kamenogorsk	CIS	33	3	6	9	34	6	0	0	0	2
1992–93	Torpedo Ust-Kamenogorsk	IHL	37	7	2	9	40	1	0	0	0	0
1993–94	Torpedo Ust-Kamenogorsk	IHL	34	1	14	15	28	—	—	—	—	—
1994–95	Torpedo Ust-Kamenogorsk	IHL	51	7	5	12	48	2	0	0	0	0
1995–96	Metallurg Magnitogorsk	IHL	51	2	7	9	10	7	0	0	0	2
1995–96	Metallurg–2 Magnitogorsk	RUS.2	1	1	0	1	2	—	—	—	—	—
1996–97	Metallurg Magnitogorsk	RSL	44	3	10	13	28	4	0	0	0	2
1997–98	Metallurg Magnitogorsk	RSL	46	2	10	12	16	10	0	1	1	10
1998–99	Metallurg Magnitogorsk	RSL	36	0	8	8	14	16	2	4	6	8
1999–2000	Metallurg Magnitogorsk	RSL	30	1	2	3	22	11	0	1	1	4
2000–01	Metallurg Magnitogorsk	RSL	39	2	2	4	16	12	1	2	3	8
2001–02	Metallurg Magnitogorsk	RSL	48	2	5	7	36	4	0	0	0	2
2002–03	Metallurg Magnitogorsk	RSL	35	0	2	2	10	2	0	0	0	2
2002–03	Metallurg–2 Magnitogorsk	RUS.3	1	0	2	2	0	—	—	—	—	—
2003–04	Avangard Omsk	RSL	16	0	0	0	8	—	—	—	—	—
2003–04	Omskie Yastreby	RUS.3	2	0	0	0	2	—	—	—	—	—
2003–04	Kazzinc-Torpedo	KAZ	4	0	0	0	0	—	—	—	—	—
2003–04	Kazzinc-Torpedo	RUS.2	12	0	3	3	2	—	—	—	—	—
URS/CIS totals			103	8	11	19	60	6	0	0	0	2
IHL totals			173	17	28	45	126	10	0	0	0	2
RSL totals			294	10	39	49	150	59	3	8	11	36

=== International ===
Year	Team	Event	GP	G	A	Pts	PIM
1992	Kazakhstan	WC C Q	2	0	0	0	0
1993	Kazakhstan	WC C	7	5	1	6	22
1994	Kazakhstan	WC C	6	5	2	7	2
1995	Kazakhstan	WC C	4	0	0	0	2
1997	Kazakhstan	WC B	7	0	1	1	0
1998	Kazakhstan	OG	7	0	3	3	8
1998	Kazakhstan	WC	3	0	0	0	2
Senior totals			36	10	7	17	16
