= Yevgeny Roshchin =

Belarusian ice hockey player

Personal information
- Nationality: Belarusian
- Born: 28 May 1962 (age 62); Minsk, Belarus

Sport
- Sport: Ice hockey

Yevgeny Roshchin (born 28 May 1962) is a Belarusian ice hockey player. He competed in the men's tournament at the 1998 Winter Olympics.

== Career statistics ==
=== Regular season and playoffs ===
			Regular season					Playoffs
Season	Team	League	GP	G	A	Pts	PIM	GP	G	A	Pts	PIM
1979–80	Dinamo Minsk	URS.2	9	2	1	3	6	—	—	—	—	—
1980–81	Dinamo Minsk	URS	36	4	2	6	10	—	—	—	—	—
1981–82	Dinamo Minsk	URS.2	50	16	6	22	28	—	—	—	—	—
1982–83	Dinamo Minsk	URS.2	58	19				—	—	—	—	—
1983–84	Dinamo Minsk	URS.2	59	26				—	—	—	—	—
1984–85	Dinamo Minsk	URS.2	45	14	17	31	26	—	—	—	—	—
1985–86	Sokil Kyiv	URS	33	9	2	11	8	—	—	—	—	—
1986–87	Sokil Kyiv	URS	33	3	4	7	12	—	—	—	—	—
1987–88	Sokil Kyiv	URS	41	6	5	11	10	—	—	—	—	—
1988–89	Sokil Kyiv	URS	25	2	2	4	18	—	—	—	—	—
1988–89	ShVSM Kyiv	URS.2	2	1	2	3	2	—	—	—	—	—
1988–89	Progress Grodno	URS.3	7	1	6	7	0	—	—	—	—	—
1989–90	Progress Grodno	URS.2	4	2	0	2	0	—	—	—	—	—
1989–90	KS Cracovia	POL
1990–91	KS Cracovia	POL		20	22	42		—	—	—	—	—
1991–92	GKS Tychy	POL
1994–95	CH Jaca	ESP
1997–98	HKm Zvolen	SVK
URS totals			168	24	15	39	58	—	—	—	—	—

=== International ===
Year	Team	Event	GP	G	A	Pts	PIM
1980	Soviet Union	EJC	5	2	1	3	0
1982	Soviet Union	WJC	7	2	5	7	4
1997	Belarus	OGQ	4	7	6	13	2
1997	Belarus	WC B	7	3	1	4	0
1998	Belarus	OG	6	0	2	2	0
Junior totals			12	4	6	10	4
Senior totals			17	10	9	19	2

"Yevgeni Roschin". Elite Prospects.
