= Konstantin Shafranov =

Kazakhstani ice hockey player

- Born: September 11, 1968 (age 57) Ust-Kamenogorsk, Kazakh SSR, Soviet Union
- Height: 5 ft 11 in (180 cm)
- Weight: 195 lb (88 kg; 13 st 13 lb)
- Position: Right wing
- Shot: Left
- Played for: Torpedo Ust-Kamenogorsk; Metallurg Magnitogorsk; St. Louis Blues; Sibir Novosibirsk; CSKA Moscow; Khimik Voskresensk; Torpedo Nizhny Novgorod; Krylya Sovetov
- National team: Kazakhstan
- NHL draft: 229th overall, 1996; St. Louis Blues
- Playing career: 1985–2010

Konstantin Vitalievich Shafranov (Russian: Константи́н Вита́льевич Шафра́нов) (born September 11, 1968) is a Kazakhstani former professional ice hockey player who played five games in the National Hockey League. He played for the St. Louis Blues. In 1996, he won the Gary F. Longman Memorial Trophy as the best rookie in the International Hockey League (IHL). Two years later he was named to the IHL's end of season all-star team, as the second best right-wing in the league.

He is currently the Fort Wayne Komets' Assistant Coach.

== Career ==
A long time veteran with his hometown club Torpedo Ust-Kamenogorsk, Shafranov was drafted by the St. Louis Blues 229th overall in the 1996 NHL entry draft. He made an immediate impact in North America, scoring 46 goals with the Fort Wayne Komets of the International Hockey League, earning himself the title of rookie of the year and a spot on the IHL's second All-Star Team. The following season, he made his NHL debuts with the Blues, scoring twice and adding an assist in 5 games. It was however all for his NHL career; he did play a few more seasons in the American Hockey League and the IHL, but he never again had an impact such as that he had in his first season with Fort Wayne, which led him to go back in Europe, where the larger ice surfaces and more open play suited much better the goal scorer's style.

Shafranov took part in various competitions for the Kazakhstani National Team, totalling 43 games for the national squad. He participated at the 2010 IIHF World Championship as a member of the Kazakhstan men's national ice hockey team.

== Career statistics ==
=== Regular season and playoffs ===
			Regular season					Playoffs
Season	Team	League	GP	G	A	Pts	PIM	GP	G	A	Pts	PIM
1985–86	Torpedo Ust–Kamenogorsk	URS.2	12	1	2	3	2	—	—	—	—	—
1986–87	Torpedo Ust–Kamenogorsk	URS.2	20	5	2	7	8	—	—	—	—	—
1988–89	SKA Novosibirsk	URS.2	71	38	23	61	33	—	—	—	—	—
1989–90	Torpedo Ust–Kamenogorsk	URS	28	6	8	14	16	—	—	—	—	—
1990–91	Torpedo Ust–Kamenogorsk	URS	40	16	6	22	32	—	—	—	—	—
1991–92	Torpedo Ust–Kamenogorsk	CIS	30	10	6	16	38	6	0	0	0	2
1992–93	Torpedo Ust–Kamenogorsk	RUS	42	19	19	38	26	1	0	1	1	0
1993–94	Torpedo Ust–Kamenogorsk	RUS	27	18	21	39	6	—	—	—	—	—
1993–94	Detroit Falcons	CoHL	4	3	2	5	0	—	—	—	—	—
1994–95	Metallurg Magnitogorsk	RUS	47	21	30	51	24	7	5	4	9	12
1994–95	Metallurg–2 Magnitogorsk	RUS.2	1	1	2	3	0	—	—	—	—	—
1995–96	Metallurg Magnitogorsk	RUS	6	3	3	6	0	—	—	—	—	—
1995–96	Fort Wayne Komets	IHL	74	46	28	74	26	5	1	2	3	4
1996–97	St. Louis Blues	NHL	5	2	1	3	0	—	—	—	—	—
1996–97	Worcester IceCats	AHL	62	23	25	48	16	5	0	2	2	0
1997–98	Fort Wayne Komets	IHL	67	28	52	80	50	4	2	4	6	2
1998–99	Metallurg Magnitogorsk	RSL	28	4	9	13	4	5	0	1	1	2
1998–99	Fort Wayne Komets	IHL	—	—	—	—	—	2	0	1	1	0
1999–2000	Grand Rapids Griffins	IHL	24	3	8	11	15	—	—	—	—	—
1999–2000	Providence Bruins	AHL	8	0	4	4	0	—	—	—	—	—
1999–2000	Fort Wayne Komets	UHL	20	15	15	30	6	13	6	8	14	8
2000–01	Sibir Novosibirsk	RUS.2	43	21	32	53	80	12	3	4	7	37
2001–02	CSKA Moscow	RUS.2	41	14	21	35	12	10	5	4	9	0
2002–03	Khimik Voskresensk	RUS.2	39	14	14	28	10	14	6	7	13	4
2003–04	Khimik Voskresensk	RSL	18	7	3	10	14	—	—	—	—	—
2003–04	Torpedo Nizhny Novgorod	RSL	31	8	6	14	10	—	—	—	—	—
2004–05	Torpedo Nizhny Novgorod	RUS.2	50	17	30	47	24	13	4	3	7	2
2005–06	Krylya Sovetov Moscow	RUS.2	48	21	46	67	42	—	—	—	—	—
2005–06	Torpedo Nizhny Novgorod	RUS.2	3	2	3	5	2	8	4	1	5	4
2006–07	Torpedo Nizhny Novgorod	RUS.2	28	10	17	27	16	12	1	4	5	4
2006–07	Torpedo–2 Nizhny Novgorod	RUS.3	3	3	6	9	0	—	—	—	—	—
2007–08	Fort Wayne Komets	IHL	71	23	35	58	10	13	4	6	10	2
2008–09	Fort Wayne Komets	IHL	60	28	35	63	28	11	2	8	10	0
2009–10	Fort Wayne Komets	IHL	58	19	38	57	20	—	—	—	—	—
URS/CIS totals			98	32	20	52	86	7	0	1	1	2
RUS & RSL totals			199	80	91	171	84	13	5	6	11	14
RUS.2 totals			253	100	165	265	186	69	23	23	46	51

=== International ===
Year	Team	Event	GP	G	A	Pts	PIM
1993	Kazakhstan	WC C	7	10	9	19	4
1994	Kazakhstan	WC C	6	7	6	13	44
1998	Kazakhstan	OG	7	4	3	7	6
1998	Kazakhstan	WC	3	0	0	0	0
2001	Kazakhstan	WC D1	5	6	4	10	0
2005	Kazakhstan	WC	6	0	0	0	0
2006	Kazakhstan	OG	5	0	0	0	0
2006	Kazakhstan	WC	6	0	1	1	8
2010	Kazakhstan	WC	6	0	4	4	0
Senior totals			51	27	27	54	62

== Awards ==
Award	Year
Gary F. Longman Memorial Trophy	1996
Second all-star team	1998
