= Vadim Glovatsky =

Soviet-Kazakhstani ice hockey player

- Born: 1 January 1970 Temirtau, Soviet Union
- Died: 5 January 2015 (aged 45) Chelyabinsk, Russia
- Height: 6 ft 0 in (183 cm)
- Weight: 200 lb (91 kg; 14 st 4 lb)
- Position: Defence
- Played for: Stroitel Temirtau (−1985); Chelmet Chelyabinsk (1985–1990); Traktor Chelyabinsk (1990–1995); Metallurg Magnitogorsk (1995–2002); Severstal Cherepovets (2002); HC Spartak Moscow (2002–2003); HC Sibir Novosibirsk (2003–2005); Mechel Chelyabinsk (2005–2006)
- National team: Kazakhstan
- Playing career: 1985–2005

Vadim Nikolayevich Glovatsky (Russian: Вадим Николаевич Гловацкий, 1 January 1970 – 5 January 2015) was a Soviet and later Kazakhstani ice hockey defender. He played for several Soviet and Russian clubs between 1985–2005, and represented Kazakhstan at the 1998 Winter Olympics, placing fifth.

Glovatsky won the Russian title with Metallurg Magnitogorsk in 1999 and 2001, placing second in 1998 and third in 2000; he won the European Hockey League title in 1999 and 2000 and the Russian Cup in 1998 with the same club. After retiring from competitions he worked as an assistant coach of Chelyabinsk Polar Bears.

== Career statistics ==
=== Regular season and playoffs ===
			Regular season					Playoffs
Season	Team	League	GP	G	A	Pts	PIM	GP	G	A	Pts	PIM
1985–86	Metallurg Chelyabinsk	URS.2	1	0	0	0	0	—	—	—	—	—
1986–87	Metallurg Chelyabinsk	URS.2	7	0	0	0	2	—	—	—	—	—
1987–88	Metallurg Chelyabinsk	URS.2	48	1	0	1	30	—	—	—	—	—
1988–89	SKA Sverdlovsk	URS.2	14	1	0	1	12	—	—	—	—	—
1988–89	Metallurg Chelyabinsk	URS.2	17	3	3	6	6	—	—	—	—	—
1989–90	Metallurg Chelyabinsk	URS.2	65	6	11	17	36	—	—	—	—	—
1990–91	Traktor Chelyabinsk	URS	21	0	2	2	16	—	—	—	—	—
1991–92	Traktor Chelyabinsk	CIS	30	0	0	0	8	1	0	0	0	0
1991–92	Mechel Chelyabinsk	CIS.2	9	1	0	1	8	—	—	—	—	—
1992–93	Traktor Chelyabinsk	IHL	40	0	4	4	24	8	0	0	0	10
1992–93	Mechel Chelyabinsk	RUS.2	2	1	0	1	4	—	—	—	—	—
1993–94	Traktor Chelyabinsk	IHL	46	2	8	10	45	6	0	0	0	10
1993–94	Mechel Chelyabinsk	RUS.2	2	0	0	0	2	—	—	—	—	—
1994–95	Traktor Chelyabinsk	IHL	52	2	17	19	56	3	0	0	0	33
1995–96	Metallurg Magnitogorsk	IHL	49	2	9	11	36	10	1	2	3	6
1995–96	Metallurg–2 Magnitogorsk	RUS.2	1	0	0	0	0	—	—	—	—	—
1996–97	Metallurg Magnitogorsk	RSL	43	8	16	24	42	11	0	4	4	8
1997–98	Metallurg Magnitogorsk	RSL	44	5	12	17	32	9	1	3	4	31
1998–99	Metallurg Magnitogorsk	RSL	34	1	9	10	14	—	—	—	—	—
1999–2000	Metallurg Magnitogorsk	RSL	31	3	12	15	22	2	0	0	0	4
1999–2000	Metallurg–2 Magnitogorsk	RUS.3	2	1	0	1	0	—	—	—	—	—
2000–01	Metallurg Magnitogorsk	RSL	34	3	7	10	18	12	1	2	3	6
2001–02	Metallurg Magnitogorsk	RSL	34	3	8	11	12	9	0	0	0	6
2001–02	Metallurg–2 Magnitogorsk	RUS.3	2	0	2	2	0	—	—	—	—	—
2002–03	Severstal Cherepovets	RSL	3	0	1	1	0	—	—	—	—	—
2002–03	Severstal–2 Cherepovets	RUS.3	8	3	4	7	8	—	—	—	—	—
2002–03	Spartak Moscow	RSL	21	0	2	2	6	—	—	—	—	—
2003–04	Sibir Novosibirsk	RSL	35	2	2	4	28	—	—	—	—	—
2003–04	Sibir–2 Novosibirsk	RUS.3	2	0	2	2	0	—	—	—	—	—
2004–05	Sibir Novosibirsk	RSL	18	0	4	4	14	—	—	—	—	—
2005–06	Mechel Chelyabinsk	RUS.2	27	2	5	7	20	—	—	—	—	—
2006–07	Polytechnic Chelyabinsk	RUS.4	1	0	0	0	0	—	—	—	—	—
URS.2/CIS.2 totals			161	12	14	26	94	—	—	—	—	—
IHL totals			187	6	38	44	161	27	1	2	3	59
RSL totals			297	25	73	98	188	43	2	9	11	55

=== International ===
Year	Team	Event	GP	G	A	Pts	PIM
1997	Kazakhstan	WC B	7	2	1	3	4
1998	Kazakhstan	OG	7	0	2	2	6
1998	Kazakhstan	WC	3	1	1	2	2
Senior totals			17	3	4	7	12
