= Brad Bergen =

German ice hockey player

Personal information
- Born: 16 March 1966 (age 59); Prince Albert, Saskatchewan, Canada

Sport
- Sport: Ice hockey

Brad Bergen (born 16 March 1966) is a Canadian ice hockey player. He competed in the men's tournament at the 1998 Winter Olympics.

== Career statistics ==
=== Regular season and playoffs ===
| | | | Regular season | | | | | Playoffs |
| Season | Team | League | GP | G | A | Pts | PIM | GP | G | A | Pts | PIM |
|---|---|---|---|---|---|---|---|---|---|---|---|---|
| 1983–84 | Humboldt Broncos | SJHL | 61 | 32 | 37 | 69 | 47 | — | — | — | — | — |
| 1984–85 | Saskatoon Blades | WHL | 1 | 0 | 2 | 2 | 0 | — | — | — | — | — |
| 1985–86 | Humboldt Broncos | SJHL | 60 | 29 | 73 | 102 | 96 | — | — | — | — | — |
| 1986–87 | Humboldt Broncos | SJHL | 49 | 29 | 61 | 90 | 77 | — | — | — | — | — |
| 1986–87 | Prince Albert Raiders | WHL | 10 | 1 | 3 | 4 | 8 | — | — | — | — | — |
| 1987–88 | ERC Westfalen Dortmund | FRG.3 | 35 | 29 | 49 | 78 | 48 | — | — | — | — | — |
| 1988–89 | ESV Königsbrunn | FRG.3 | 26 | 21 | 27 | 48 | 38 | 12 | 14 | 14 | 28 | 12 |
| 1989–90 | ESV Königsbrunn | FRG.3 | 36 | 34 | 39 | 73 | 31 | — | — | — | — | — |
| 1990–91 | ESV Königsbrunn | GER.3 | 30 | 16 | 32 | 48 | 42 | — | — | — | — | — |
| 1991–92 | ESV Königsbrunn | GER.3 | 42 | 35 | 50 | 85 | 48 | — | — | — | — | — |
| 1992–93 | EC Ratingen | 1.GBun | 30 | 9 | 14 | 23 | 14 | 3 | 0 | 1 | 1 | 2 |
| 1993–94 | EC Ratingen | 1.GBun | 19 | 10 | 5 | 15 | 18 | — | — | — | — | — |
| 1993–94 | Krefelder EV 1981 | 1.GBun | 18 | 1 | 2 | 3 | 8 | 6 | 0 | 1 | 1 | 2 |
| 1994–95 | Krefelder EV 1981 | DEL | 43 | 7 | 17 | 24 | 40 | 15 | 2 | 8 | 10 | 14 |
| 1995–96 | Düsseldorfer EG | DEL | 50 | 7 | 18 | 25 | 20 | 13 | 7 | 6 | 13 | 6 |
| 1996–97 | Düsseldorfer EG | DEL | 48 | 5 | 21 | 26 | 30 | 4 | 0 | 2 | 2 | 0 |
| 1997–98 | Düsseldorfer EG | DEL | 44 | 12 | 25 | 37 | 39 | 3 | 0 | 0 | 0 | 12 |
| 1998–99 | Augsburger Panther | DEL | 51 | 8 | 22 | 30 | 44 | 5 | 1 | 2 | 3 | 4 |
| 1999–2000 | Augsburger Panther | DEL | 55 | 10 | 27 | 37 | 40 | 3 | 1 | 2 | 3 | 2 |
| 2000–01 | Adler Mannheim | DEL | 59 | 3 | 17 | 20 | 32 | 12 | 0 | 6 | 6 | 2 |
| 2001–02 | Adler Mannheim | DEL | 47 | 6 | 8 | 14 | 30 | 12 | 2 | 5 | 7 | 8 |
| 2002–03 | Eisbären Berlin | DEL | 52 | 3 | 16 | 19 | 28 | 9 | 1 | 2 | 3 | 14 |
| 2003–04 | Eisbären Berlin | DEL | 44 | 2 | 3 | 5 | 45 | 11 | 0 | 0 | 0 | 10 |
| 2004–05 | SERC Wild Wings | GER.2 | 52 | 9 | 41 | 50 | 56 | 7 | 0 | 9 | 9 | 10 |
| 2005–06 | SERC Wild Wings | GER.2 | 52 | 9 | 45 | 54 | 52 | 11 | 3 | 7 | 10 | 14 |
| 2006–07 | SERC Wild Wings | GER.2 | 50 | 8 | 34 | 42 | 97 | 5 | 0 | 3 | 3 | 8 |
| 2007–08 | SERC Wild Wings | GER.2 | 50 | 6 | 28 | 34 | 76 | 11 | 1 | 2 | 3 | 6 |
| FRG.3/GER.3 totals | | | 169 | 135 | 197 | 332 | 207 | 12 | 14 | 14 | 28 | 12 |
| DEL totals | | | 493 | 63 | 174 | 237 | 348 | 87 | 14 | 33 | 47 | 72 |
| GER.2 totals | | | 204 | 32 | 148 | 180 | 281 | 34 | 4 | 21 | 25 | 38 |

=== International ===
| Year | Team | Event | GP | G | A | Pts | PIM |
|---|---|---|---|---|---|---|---|
| 1996 | Germany | WC | 6 | 0 | 1 | 1 | 6 |
| 1996 | Germany | WCH | 1 | 0 | 0 | 0 | 0 |
| 1997 | Germany | OGQ | 3 | 3 | 3 | 6 | 2 |
| 1997 | Germany | WC | 8 | 2 | 0 | 2 | 4 |
| 1998 | Germany | OG | 3 | 1 | 1 | 2 | 0 |
| Senior totals | | | 21 | 6 | 5 | 11 | 12 |

"Bradley Bergen". Elite Prospects.
