= Markus Wieland =

German ice hockey player

Personal information
- Nationality: German
- Born: 26 May 1976 (age 48); Tegernsee, Germany

Sport
- Sport: Ice hockey

Markus Wieland (born 26 May 1976) is a German ice hockey player. He competed in the men's tournament at the 1998 Winter Olympics.

== Career statistics ==
=== Regular season and playoffs ===
			Regular season					Playoffs
Season	Team	League	GP	G	A	Pts	PIM	GP	G	A	Pts	PIM
1992–93	Sportbund DJK Rosenheim	GER U20	31	3	11	14	14	—	—	—	—	—
1993–94	Sportbund DJK Rosenheim	1.GBun	33	0	0	0	0	6	0	0	0	0
1994–95	Star Bulls Rosenheim GmbH	GER U20	6	3	4	7	10	—	—	—	—	—
1994–95	Star Bulls Rosenheim GmbH	DEL	40	2	5	7	16	7	1	1	2	8
1995–96	Star Bulls Rosenheim GmbH	GER U20	7	0	3	3	29	—	—	—	—	—
1995–96	Star Bulls Rosenheim GmbH	DEL	40	2	8	10	38	4	0	0	0	2
1996–97	EV Landshut	DEL	47	4	11	15	64	7	0	0	0	16
1997–98	EV Landshut	DEL	32	0	1	1	49	6	0	0	0	10
1998–99	EV Landshut	DEL	45	0	3	3	34	3	0	0	0	2
1999–2000	Adler Mannheim	DEL	42	0	7	7	14	1	0	0	0	0
2000–01	EC Bad Tölz	GER.2	39	7	12	19	26	13	1	1	2	18
2001–02	ERC Ingolstadt	GER.2	50	4	10	14	60	11	2	3	5	10
2002–03	SC Bietigheim-Bissingen	GER.2	55	5	24	29	100	7	2	1	3	14
2003–04	SC Bietigheim-Bissingen	GER.2	40	3	21	24	65	8	0	3	3	16
2004–05	SC Bietigheim-Bissingen	GER.2	44	5	21	26	109	6	0	0	0	8
2005–06	SC Bietigheim-Bissingen	GER.2	44	2	21	23	94	7	0	2	2	6
2006–07	Bietigheim Steelers	GER.2	42	2	14	16	64	—	—	—	—	—
2007–08	EHC München	GER.2	17	2	8	10	26	—	—	—	—	—
DEL totals			246	8	35	43	215	28	1	1	2	38
GER.2 totals			331	30	131	161	544	52	5	10	15	72

=== International ===
Year	Team	Event	GP	G	A	Pts	PIM
1993	Germany	EJC	6	0	0	0	2
1994	Germany	WJC	7	0	0	0	2
1994	Germany	EJC	5	0	0	0	6
1995	Germany	WJC	7	1	0	1	4
1995	Germany	WC	5	0	1	1	0
1996	Germany	WC	6	0	0	0	0
1997	Germany	OGQ	3	0	0	0	2
1997	Germany	WC	8	0	1	1	2
1998	Germany	OLY	4	0	2	2	6
Junior totals			25	1	0	1	14
Senior totals			26	0	4	4	10

"Markus Wieland". Elite Prospects.
