= Pavel Kamentsev =

Kazakhstani ice hockey player

- Born: August 15, 1969 (age 55); Ust-Kamenogorsk, Kazakh SSR, Soviet Union
- Height: 6 ft 0 in (183 cm)
- Weight: 181 lb (82 kg; 12 st 13 lb)
- Position: Centre
- Shot: Left
- Played for: Energiya Kemerovo; Kazzinc-Torpedo; Sibir Novosibirsk; Avangard Omsk; SKA MVO Kalinin
- National team: Kazakhstan
- Playing career: 1987–2007

Pavel Gennadyevich Kamentsev (Russian: Павел Геннадьевич Каменцев); born 15 August 1969) is a Kazakhstani retired ice hockey player. During his career he played for several teams in both Russia and Kazakhstan. Kementsev also played for the Kazakhstani national team at the 1998 Winter Olympic Games and multiple World Championships.

== Career statistics ==
=== Regular season and playoffs ===
			Regular season					Playoffs
Season	Team	League	GP	G	A	Pts	PIM	GP	G	A	Pts	PIM
1986–87	Torpedo Ust–Kamenogorsk	URS.2	1	0	0	0	0	—	—	—	—	—
1987–88	Torpedo Ust–Kamenogorsk	URS	17	0	1	1	6	—	—	—	—	—
1988–89	SKA MVO Kalinin	URS.2	70	10	11	21	28	—	—	—	—	—
1989–90	SKA MVO Kalinin	URS.2	62	13	4	17	42	—	—	—	—	—
1990–91	Torpedo Ust–Kamenogorsk	URS	44	6	9	15	18	—	—	—	—	—
1991–92	Torpedo Ust–Kamenogorsk	CIS	36	7	11	18	18	6	0	1	1	0
1992–93	Torpedo Ust–Kamenogorsk	IHL	41	9	7	16	26	1	0	0	0	2
1993–94	Torpedo Ust–Kamenogorsk	IHL	18	4	4	8	6	—	—	—	—	—
1994–95	Torpedo Ust–Kamenogorsk	IHL	49	14	11	25	40	2	1	0	1	2
1995–96	Avangard Omsk	IHL	47	12	8	20	38	3	1	0	1	0
1996–97	Avangard Omsk	RSL	35	13	12	25	30	5	0	1	1	4
1997–98	Avangard Omsk	RSL	42	8	8	16	32	4	1	1	2	8
1998–99	Avangard Omsk	RSL	41	6	12	18	38	6	2	2	4	6
1999–2000	Avangard Omsk	RSL	25	3	5	8	18	—	—	—	—	—
2000–01	Energia Kemerovo	RUS.2	36	4	8	12	58	—	—	—	—	—
2000–01	Sibir Novosibirsk	RUS.2	10	3	6	9	20	14	4	4	8	16
2001–02	Energia Kemerovo	RUS.2	49	8	15	23	58	11	2	5	7	10
2002–03	Energia Kemerovo	RUS.2	52	9	31	40	60	11	0	3	3	8
2003–04	Energia Kemerovo	RUS.2	52	6	19	25	56	5	0	1	1	8
2004–05	Kazzinc–Torpedo	KAZ	4	1	0	1	4	—	—	—	—	—
2004–05	Kazzinc–Torpedo	RUS.2	17	4	3	7	18	—	—	—	—	—
2004–05	Energia Kemerovo	RUS.2	20	5	6	11	24	3	1	1	2	0
2005–06	Energia Kemerovo	RUS.2	40	9	17	26	85	5	1	0	1	18
2006–07	Energia Kemerovo	RUS.2	47	6	17	23	137	—	—	—	—	—
IHL totals			155	39	30	69	110	6	2	0	2	4
RSL totals			143	30	37	67	118	15	3	4	7	18
RUS.2 totals			323	54	122	176	516	49	8	14	22	60

=== International ===
Year	Team	Event	GP	G	A	Pts	PIM
1993	Kazakhstan	WC C	5	1	2	3	0
1995	Kazakhstan	WC C	4	2	2	4	0
1996	Kazakhstan	WC C	7	1	2	3	4
1997	Kazakhstan	WC B	7	1	2	3	10
1998	Kazakhstan	OG	7	2	0	2	4
1998	Kazakhstan	WC	3	1	0	1	6
1999	Kazakhstan	WC B	7	1	6	7	4
2001	Kazakhstan	WC D1	5	0	1	1	4
2002	Kazakhstan	WC D1	5	1	5	6	0
2003	Kazakhstan	WC D1	3	0	0	0	2
Senior totals			53	10	20	30	34
