= Aleksandr Shumidub =

Belarusian ice hockey player and manager (1964–2019)

Personal information
- Nationality: Belarusian
- Born: 17 March 1964; Minsk, Belarusian SSR
- Died: 13 July 2019 (aged 55); Minsk, Belarus

Sport
- Sport: Ice hockey

Aleksandr Shumidub (17 March 1964 – 13 July 2019) was a Belarusian ice hockey player and manager. Shumidud played in the Soviet Hockey League and the Russian Superleague for HC Dinamo Minsk. He competed in the men's tournament at the 1998 Winter Olympics for Belarus.
