= Mark Faucette =

American ice hockey official

Mark Faucette (born June 9, 1958, in Springfield, Massachusetts) was a National Hockey League referee. He refereed NHL games on a regular basis from the 1987–88 NHL season until the 2002–03 NHL season. He officiated 918 regular season games, 72 playoff games, one All-Star game and the 1998 Nagano Olympics. From the 1994–95 NHL season until the end of his refereeing career, he wore uniform number 11, which is now worn by Kelly Sutherland.

Faucette was honored by his peers with a portrait illustrating his refereeing career by artist Mike Mellet.

He is currently an Officiating Manager with the National Hockey League.
