= Gord Broseker =

Canadian ice hockey official

Gord Broseker (born July 8, 1950, in Baltimore, Maryland) is a retired National Hockey League linesman. His career started in 1973 and ended in 2002. During his career, he officiated nine Stanley Cup finals, 1,863 regular season games, 227 playoff games, and two All-Star games. He also worked five Canada cup finals, the 1996 World Cup of Hockey, and the 1998 Nagano Olympics, including the bronze medal game. His career included the 1987 game between the Devils and the Calgary Flames which played before only 334 fans due to a snowstorm. From the 1994-95 season until his retirement, he wore uniform number 55. His linesman jersey was sold at auction.

After his retirement he worked as the director of officiating .
