= Ray Scapinello =

Canadian ice hockey official (born 1946)

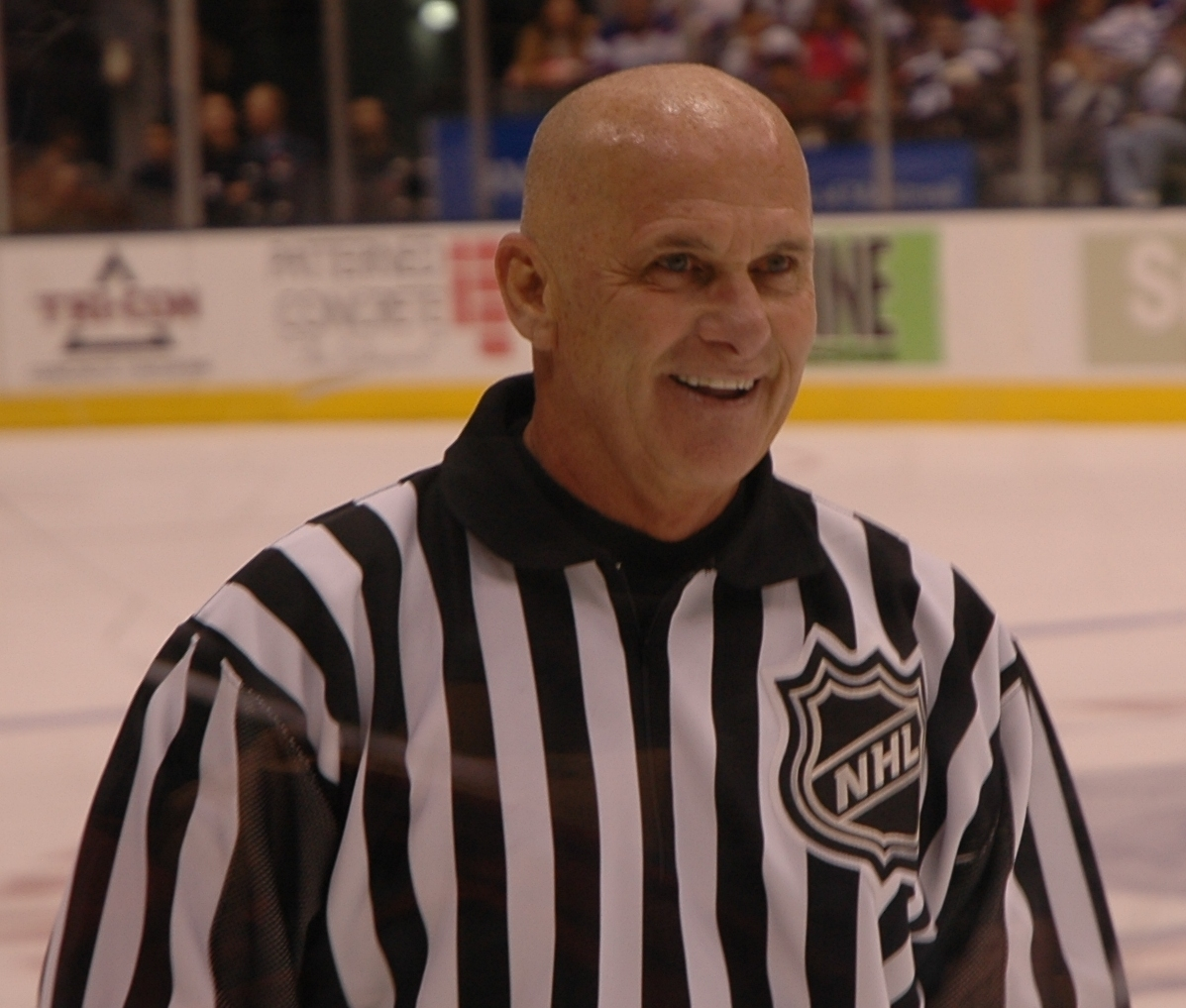
- Scapinello in 2008
- Born: Raymond Angelo Joseph Scapinello; November 5, 1946 (age 79); Glen Christie, Ontario, Canada
- Occupation: Ice hockey linesman
- Years active: 1971–2004
- Employer: National Hockey League
Ice hockey career
- Hockey Hall of Fame, 2008 (Official)

Raymond Angelo Joseph Scapinello (born November 5, 1946) is a former National Hockey League linesman, known for having the longest on-ice career of anyone in the history of the NHL.

== Early life ==
Ray Scapinello grew up in Glen Christie, Ontario, located between Guelph and Hespeler in Ontario, Canada. Glen Christie had a population of approximately 80 and was built around a Quarry. Ray is the son of Dorothy and George "Sonny" Scapinello. He has one older sister, Dianne, one younger brother, Dougie, and a nephew, Adam. Scapinello played hockey growing up and earned the nickname "Scampy" due to his small stature and exceptional skating ability. Despite being a skilled skater, Scapinello never made it into professional hockey, and had stopped playing by the age of 21.

== Officiating career ==
During the late 1960s, Scapinello joined the Guelph Referees Association and began officiating games for them while he was working for General Electric. He was invited to the NHL rookie official's camp in 1970 and despite not making the cut, he was invited to officiate in the Ontario Hockey Association. Scapinello spent one year officiating in the OHA before he was again invited to the NHL rookie official's camp. This time he made the cut and at age 24, was hired into the NHL in 1971. Scapinello officiated his first NHL game on October 17, 1971. It took place in Buffalo between the Buffalo Sabres and the Minnesota North Stars.

In the spring of 1980, Scapinello officiated his first Stanley Cup Final. This was one of a total of 21 he officiated during his career. He wore 53 from the 1994-95 NHL season until the end, when the nameplates were changed back to numbers. In 1998, Scapinello was chosen as one of 4 officials to participate in the 1998 Winter Olympics in Nagano, Japan. Despite being unprepared, Scapinello and the other officials managed to learn the differences in rules between olympic ice hockey and ice hockey in the NHL. One of the biggest differences for the officials proved to be the rule that required all officials to wear protective helmets while on ice, and this marked the only time in Scapinello's career that he wore one (he was included under a grandfather clause in the NHL; he retired before the clause was revoked and helmets became mandatory for all officials in the 2006-07 season).

Scapinello's final regular season NHL game came on April 2, 2004, a game held in Buffalo between the Buffalo Sabres and the Toronto Maple Leafs. Scapinello chose this to be his final game as he wanted to end his career in the same place he started it. Although this was his final regular season game, he participated in the 2004 Stanley Cup Playoffs.

Scapinello finally did retire in June 2004 after 33 seasons in the NHL as a linesman. His career includes 2,500 regular season games, 426 playoff games, the Canada Cup, the 1996 World Cup of Hockey, three All-Star games, including the 1979 Challenge Cup and Rendez-vous '87, and 21 Stanley Cup Final. Of these feats, the most impressive is the fact that he never once missed a game due to injury or illness.

After retiring, Scapinello took a part-time job as an officials supervisor in two amateur hockey leagues, the Ontario Hockey League in Canada and the Central Hockey League in the United States. He has also instructed at summer officiating camps, including the North American School of Officiating.

On June 17, 2008, it was announced that Scapinello would be inducted into the Hockey Hall of Fame as an on-ice official.

== Personal life ==
Ray is married to Maureen and they have one child, Ryan. His nephew, Adam, was the news editor at the Dalhousie Gazette, North America's oldest campus newspaper.

== Books ==
- Scapinello, Ray; Simpson, Rob (2006). Between the Lines: Not-So-Tall Tales From Ray "Scampy" Scapinello's Four Decades in the NHL. ISBN 0-470-83834-5.

== See also ==
- List of members of the Hockey Hall of Fame
- List of NHL on-ice officials

== Sources ==
- Scapinello, Ray; Simpson, Rob (2006). Between the Lines: Not-So-Tall Tales From Ray "Scampy" Scapinello's Four Decades in the NHL. Toronto, Ontario: John Wiley & Sons Canada, Ltd. ISBN 0-470-83834-5.
