= Serge Poudrier =

French ice hockey player

Personal information
- Nationality: French
- Born: 22 April 1966 (age 58); Thetford Mines, Quebec, Canada

Sport
- Sport: Ice hockey

Serge Poudrier (born 22 April 1966) is a Canadian-born French former ice hockey player. He competed in the men's tournaments at the 1992, the 1994 and the 1998 Winter Olympics.
