= Vladimir Zavyalov (ice hockey) =

Kazakhstani ice hockey player

- Born: May 1, 1974 (age 50); Ust-Kamenogorsk, Kazakh SSR, Soviet Union
- Height: 6 ft 0 in (183 cm)
- Weight: 181 lb (82 kg; 12 st 13 lb)
- Position: Centre
- Shot: Left
- Played for: Kazakhmys Satpaev; Saryarka Karagandy; Barys Astana; HK Vitebsk; Dinamo Minsk; Yunost Minsk; Gazovik Tyumen; Sibir Novosibirsk; CSKA Moscow; Krylya Sovetov Moscow; Metallurg Novokuznetsk; Vityaz Chekhov; Severstal Cherepovets; Neftekhimik Nizhnekamsk
- National team: Kazakhstan
- Playing career: 1987–2007

Vladimir Vladimirovich Zavyalov (Russian: Владимир Владимирович Завьялов; born 1 May 1974) is a Kazakhstani retired ice hockey player. During his career he played for several teams in Kazakhstan, Russia, and Belarus. Zavyalov also played for the Kazakhstani national team at the 1998 Winter Olympic Games and multiple World Championships.

== Career statistics ==
=== Regular season and playoffs ===
			Regular season					Playoffs
Season	Team	League	GP	G	A	Pts	PIM	GP	G	A	Pts	PIM
1991–92	ShVSM Ust–Kamenogorsk	CIS.3	46	8	0	8	18	—	—	—	—	—
1992–93	Torpedo–2 Ust–Kamenogorsk	RUS.2	42	11	5	16	22	—	—	—	—	—
1992–93	Torpedo Ust–Kamenogorsk	IHL	—	—	—	—	—	2	1	0	1	0
1993–94	Torpedo Ust–Kamenogorsk	IHL	7	0	1	1	2	—	—	—	—	—
1993–94	Torpedo–2 Ust–Kamenogorsk	RUS.3		3	1	4		—	—	—	—	—
1994–95	Torpedo Ust–Kamenogorsk	IHL	29	2	1	3	4	2	0	0	0	0
1995–96	Torpedo Ust–Kamenogorsk	IHL	38	6	3	9	28	—	—	—	—	—
1995–96	Torpedo–2 Ust–Kamenogorsk	RUS.2	2	0	2	2	0	—	—	—	—	—
1996–97	Torpedo Ust–Kamenogorsk	RUS.2	26	15	6	21	22	—	—	—	—	—
1996–97	Torpedo–2 Ust–Kamenogorsk	RUS.3	1	1	1	2	0	—	—	—	—	—
1996–97	Neftekhimik Nizhnekamsk	RSL	13	2	4	6	8	2	0	0	0	0
1997–98	Severstal Cherepovets	RSL	46	12	7	19	32	3	0	0	0	2
1998–99	Severstal Cherepovets	RSL	23	1	0	1	8	—	—	—	—	—
1998–99	Severstal–2 Cherepovets	RUS.3	1	3	0	3	0	—	—	—	—	—
1998–99	Metallurg Novokuznetsk	RSL	11	2	4	6	4	6	3	0	3	2
1999–2000	Torpedo Ust–Kamenogorsk	RUS.3	4	2	2	4	2	—	—	—	—	—
1999–2000	Metallurg Novokuznetsk	RSL	4	0	0	0	4	—	—	—	—	—
1999–2000	HC Vityaz	RUS.2	15	4	9	13	10	10	2	1	3	2
2000–01	Krylia Sovetov Moscow	RUS.2	44	20	12	32	28	14	11	5	16	8
2001–02	Krylia Sovetov Moscow	RSL	8	0	0	0	2	—	—	—	—	—
2001–02	Krylia Sovetov–2 Moscow	RUS.3	6	7	5	12	6	—	—	—	—	—
2001–02	CSKA Moscow	RSL	10	0	0	0	6	—	—	—	—	—
2001–02	Sibir Novosibirsk	RUS.2	18	5	2	7	18	9	2	0	2	0
2001–02	Sibir–2 Novosibirsk	RUS.3	3	3	4	7	2	—	—	—	—	—
2002–03	Gazovik Tyumen	RUS.2	12	2	1	3	8	—	—	—	—	—
2003–04	Yunost Minsk	BLR	44	11	8	19	28	10	0	1	1	2
2003–04	Yunior Minsk	BLR	3	1	2	3	2	—	—	—	—	—
2004–05	Dinamo Minsk	BLR	10	1	2	3	8	—	—	—	—	—
2004–05	HK Vladimir	RUS.3	39	14	25	39	34	—	—	—	—	—
2004–05	HC Rybinsk	RUS.4	2	1	1	2	2	—	—	—	—	—
2005–06	HK Vitebsk	BLR	11	1	0	1	20	—	—	—	—	—
2005–06	Barys Astana	KAZ	11	1	2	3	12	—	—	—	—	—
2005–06	Barys Astana	RUS.3	44	20	14	34	32	—	—	—	—	—
2006–07	Barys Astana	KAZ	1	1	2	3	0	—	—	—	—	—
2006–07	Barys Astana	RUS.3	5	0	1	1	0	—	—	—	—	—
2006–07	Saryarka Karaganda	KAZ	18	3	4	7	18	—	—	—	—	—
2006–07	Saryarka Karaganda	RUS.3	35	11	8	19	18	—	—	—	—	—
2007–08	Kazakhmys Satpaev	RUS.2	2	0	0	0	0	—	—	—	—	—
2007–08	Saryarka Karaganda	KAZ	7	2	2	4	4	—	—	—	—	—
2007–08	Saryarka Karaganda	RUS.3	18	5	11	16	16	—	—	—	—	—
RUS.2 totals			161	62	32	94	108	33	15	6	21	10
IHL & RSL totals			189	25	20	45	98	15	4	0	4	4
RUS.3 totals			189	81	81	162	114	—	—	—	—	—

- RUS.3 totals do not include numbers from the 1993–94 season.

=== International ===
Year	Team	Event	GP	G	A	Pts	PIM
1997	Kazakhstan	WC B	7	3	3	6	4
1998	Kazakhstan	OG	7	0	3	3	4
1999	Kazakhstan	WC Q	3	1	1	2	0
2000	Kazakhstan	WC B	7	4	2	6	6
Senior totals			24	8	9	17	14
