= Kevin Collins (ice hockey) =

American ice hockey official

Kevin Collins (born December 15, 1950, in Springfield, Massachusetts) is a retired National Hockey League linesman. His career started in 1971 and ended in 2005. During his career (in which he never wore a helmet due to a grandfather clause), he officiated 2,438 regular season games, 296 playoff games, twelve Stanley Cup Finals (including Game 7 in 1994 and 2001) and two All-Star games. He also worked the 1996 World Cup of Hockey, four Canada Cups and the 1998 Nagano Olympics. From the 1994-95 season until his retirement, he wore uniform number 50.
