= Andrei Pchelyakov =

Kazakhstani ice hockey player

- Born: February 19, 1972 (age 53) Ust-Kamenogorsk, USSR
- Height: 5 ft 10 in (178 cm)
- Weight: 176 lb (80 kg; 12 st 8 lb)
- Position: Right wing
- Shot: Left
- Played for: Torpedo Ust-Kamenogorsk; Avangard Omsk; Severstal Cherepovets; Metallurg Novokuznetsk; SKA Saint Petersburg; Krylya Sovetov Moscow; Amur Khabarovsk
- National team: Kazakhstan
- Playing career: 1991–2012

Andrei Vladimirovich Pchelyakov (Russian: Андрей Владимирович Пчеляков; born February 19, 1972) is a Kazakhstani former professional ice hockey forward.

He was a member of the Kazakhstan men's national ice hockey team at the 2006 Winter Olympics as well as the IIHF 2006 World Ice Hockey Championships. He also competed at the 1998 Winter Olympics and the 2006 Winter Olympics.

== Career statistics ==
=== Regular season and playoffs ===
			Regular season					Playoffs
Season	Team	League	GP	G	A	Pts	PIM	GP	G	A	Pts	PIM
1991–92	Torpedo Ust–Kamenogorsk	CIS	6	0	1	1	0	5	0	1	1	2
1991–92	ShVSM Ust–Kamenogorsk	CIS.3	33	10	13	23	26	—	—	—	—	—
1992–93	Torpedo Ust–Kamenogorsk	IHL	26	6	3	9	10	1	1	0	1	0
1992–93	Torpedo–2 Ust–Kamenogorsk	RUS.2	5	4	0	4	0	—	—	—	—	—
1993–94	Torpedo Ust–Kamenogorsk	IHL	41	8	4	12	12	—	—	—	—	—
1994–95	Torpedo Ust–Kamenogorsk	IHL	48	17	11	28	24	2	0	0	0	0
1995–96	Torpedo Ust–Kamenogorsk	IHL	48	7	15	22	38	—	—	—	—	—
1996–97	Torpedo Ust–Kamenogorsk	RUS.2	25	9	13	22	16	—	—	—	—	—
1996–97	Torpedo–2 Ust–Kamenogorsk	RUS.3	1	0	0	0	0	—	—	—	—	—
1996–97	Avangard Omsk	RSL	13	2	1	3	8	5	0	0	0	2
1997–98	Severstal Cherepovets	RSL	40	10	15	25	48	4	0	1	1	2
1997–98	Severstal–2 Cherepovets	RUS.3	2	1	1	2	4	—	—	—	—	—
1998–99	Severstal Cherepovets	RSL	41	7	5	12	85	3	0	1	1	14
1999–2000	Severstal Cherepovets	RSL	35	7	4	11	34	8	1	3	4	6
1999–2000	Severstal–2 Cherepovets	RUS.3	1	0	1	1	0	—	—	—	—	—
2000–01	Severstal Cherepovets	RSL	42	1	16	17	20	9	0	3	3	26
2000–01	Severstal–2 Cherepovets	RUS.3	1	0	0	0	0	—	—	—	—	—
2001–02	Severstal Cherepovets	RSL	44	6	14	20	54	4	0	1	1	0
2002–03	Severstal Cherepovets	RSL	2	0	1	1	2	—	—	—	—	—
2002–03	Severstal–2 Cherepovets	RUS.3	5	0	2	2	22	—	—	—	—	—
2002–03	Metallurg Novokuznetsk	RSL	30	6	6	12	20	—	—	—	—	—
2003–04	SKA St. Petersburg	RSL	34	2	0	2	24	—	—	—	—	—
2003–04	SKA–2 St. Petersburg	RUS.3	3	2	2	4	2	—	—	—	—	—
2003–04	Metallurg Novokuznetsk	RSL	13	0	2	2	12	4	0	0	0	0
2004–05	HC MVD	RUS.2	37	4	9	13	30	13	5	7	12	14
2005–06	Krylia Sovetov Moscow	RUS.2	41	5	17	22	42	15	2	6	8	52
2006–07	Krylia Sovetov Moscow	RSL	22	4	5	9	40	—	—	—	—	—
2006–07	Amur Khabarovsk	RSL	22	1	4	5	16	—	—	—	—	—
2007–08	Krylia Sovetov Moscow	RUS.2	52	9	25	34	108	3	0	0	0	4
2007–08	Krylia Sovetov–2 Moscow	RUS.3	1	0	0	0	0	—	—	—	—	—
2008–09	HK Gomel	BLR	48	10	19	29	74	15	3	5	8	12
2009–10	HK Gomel	BLR	43	3	19	22	119	4	0	0	0	2
2010–11	Shinnik Bobruisk	BLR	27	1	6	7	92	—	—	—	—	—
2010–11	Metallurg Zhlobin	BLR	13	2	0	2	8	—	—	—	—	—
2010–11	Metallurg–2 Zhlobin	BLR.2	1	0	0	0	0	—	—	—	—	—
2011–12	HC Astana	KAZ	11	0	1	1	27	—	—	—	—	—
IHL totals			163	38	33	71	84	3	1	0	1	0
RUS.2 totals			160	31	64	95	196	31	7	13	20	70
RSL totals			338	46	73	119	363	37	1	9	10	50

=== International ===
Year	Team	Event	GP	G	A	Pts	PIM
1993	Kazakhstan	WC C	7	5	7	12	4
1994	Kazakhstan	WC C	6	1	1	2	2
1995	Kazakhstan	WC C	4	4	3	7	2
1996	Kazakhstan	WC C	7	2	1	3	0
1997	Kazakhstan	WC B	7	1	1	2	6
1998	Kazakhstan	OG	7	1	2	3	4
1998	Kazakhstan	WC	3	2	1	3	4
1999	Kazakhstan	WC B	7	1	1	2	12
2005	Kazakhstan	WC	6	0	1	1	12
2006	Kazakhstan	OG	5	0	0	0	4
2006	Kazakhstan	WC	6	1	1	2	10
Senior totals			65	18	19	37	60
