= Yevgeni Koreshkov =

Kazakhstani ice hockey player

- Born: 11 March 1970 (age 55); Ust-Kamenogorsk, Kazakh SSR, Soviet Union
- Height: 5 ft 7 in (170 cm)
- Weight: 181 lb (82 kg; 12 st 13 lb)
- Position: Centre
- Shot: Left
- Played for: Torpedo Ust-Kamenogorsk; Buran Voronezh; Lada Togliatti; Metallurg Magnitogorsk; Sibir Novosibirsk; Severstal Cherepovets; Mechel Chelyabinsk; HC Martigny
- National team: Kazakhstan
- NHL draft: Undrafted
- Playing career: 1987–2007

Yevgeni Gennadievich Koreshkov (Russian: Евгений Геннадьевич Корешков; born 11 March 1970 in Ust Kamenogorsk, Kazakh SSR, Soviet Union) is a Kazakhstani former ice hockey player of Russian descent and a Russian ice hockey coach. He is a younger brother of Alexander Koreshkov.

== Playing career ==
He is a graduate of Torpedo Ust-Kamenogorsk ice hockey school. Koreshkov played in Russia for HC Lada Togliatti, Metallurg Magnitogorsk, Sibir Novosibirsk, Severstal Cherepovets and Mechel Chelyabinsk. He also played for the Kazakhstan national team in the 1998 and 2006 Winter Olympics. In the 2006 Olympics, he scored five goals in five games before Kazakhstan were eliminated in the preliminary round of the tournament.

Koreshkov is currently the head coach of Stalnye Lisy in the Junior Hockey League (JHL) in Russia.

== Personal ==
He also holds Russian citizenship.

== Career statistics ==
=== Regular season and playoffs ===
| | | | Regular season | | | | | Playoffs |
| Season | Team | League | GP | G | A | Pts | PIM | GP | G | A | Pts | PIM |
|---|---|---|---|---|---|---|---|---|---|---|---|---|
| 1987–88 | Buran Voronezh | URS.2 | 65 | 13 | 7 | 20 | 12 | — | — | — | — | — |
| 1988–89 | Buran Voronezh | URS.3 | 54 | 9 | 8 | 17 | 18 | — | — | — | — | — |
| 1989–90 | Buran Voronezh | URS.2 | 36 | 13 | 16 | 29 | 20 | — | — | — | — | — |
| 1989–90 | SKA MVO Kalinin | URS.2 | 25 | 6 | 9 | 15 | 18 | — | — | — | — | — |
| 1990–91 | Lada Togliatti | URS.2 | 59 | 26 | 27 | 53 | 32 | — | — | — | — | — |
| 1991–92 | Lada Togliatti | CIS | 27 | 7 | 5 | 12 | 14 | — | — | — | — | — |
| 1992–93 | Torpedo Ust–Kamenogorsk | IHL | 38 | 18 | 16 | 34 | 25 | 1 | 0 | 0 | 0 | 0 |
| 1993–94 | Torpedo Ust–Kamenogorsk | IHL | 43 | 25 | 12 | 37 | 38 | — | — | — | — | — |
| 1994–95 | Metallurg Magnitogorsk | IHL | 51 | 33 | 20 | 53 | 32 | 7 | 3 | 5 | 8 | 4 |
| 1995–96 | Metallurg Magnitogorsk | IHL | 50 | 19 | 10 | 29 | 26 | 10 | 4 | 2 | 6 | 4 |
| 1995–96 | Metallurg–2 Magnitogorsk | RUS.2 | 1 | 0 | 0 | 0 | 0 | — | — | — | — | — |
| 1996–97 | Metallurg Magnitogorsk | RSL | 44 | 17 | 14 | 31 | 48 | 11 | 8 | 4 | 12 | 10 |
| 1997–98 | Metallurg Magnitogorsk | RSL | 40 | 13 | 21 | 34 | 42 | 10 | 6 | 3 | 9 | 18 |
| 1998–99 | Metallurg Magnitogorsk | RSL | 40 | 25 | 18 | 43 | 46 | 15 | 4 | 8 | 12 | 10 |
| 1999–2000 | Metallurg Magnitogorsk | RSL | 36 | 17 | 18 | 35 | 67 | 12 | 5 | 7 | 12 | 4 |
| 2000–01 | Metallurg Magnitogorsk | RSL | 40 | 15 | 16 | 31 | 36 | 12 | 6 | 7 | 13 | 37 |
| 2001–02 | Metallurg Magnitogorsk | RSL | 51 | 19 | 19 | 38 | 44 | 9 | 1 | 2 | 3 | 2 |
| 2002–03 | Metallurg Magnitogorsk | RSL | 51 | 12 | 10 | 22 | 48 | 3 | 1 | 0 | 1 | 2 |
| 2003–04 | Metallurg Magnitogorsk | RSL | 55 | 9 | 28 | 37 | 26 | 14 | 2 | 3 | 5 | 18 |
| 2004–05 | Sibir Novosibirsk | RSL | 31 | 4 | 4 | 8 | 26 | — | — | — | — | — |
| 2004–05 | Severstal Cherepovets | RSL | 11 | 2 | 2 | 4 | 8 | — | — | — | — | — |
| 2004–05 | Mechel Chelyabinsk | RUS.2 | 4 | 1 | 4 | 5 | 0 | 4 | 0 | 1 | 1 | 0 |
| 2004–05 | Mechel–2 Chelyabinsk | RUS.3 | 2 | 2 | 1 | 3 | 0 | — | — | — | — | — |
| 2005–06 | Kazzinc–Torpedo | KAZ | 18 | 3 | 3 | 6 | 20 | — | — | — | — | — |
| 2005–06 | Kazzinc–Torpedo | RUS.2 | 37 | 16 | 23 | 39 | 36 | — | — | — | — | — |
| 2006–07 | HC Martigny | SUI.2 | 42 | 21 | 31 | 52 | 60 | — | — | — | — | — |
| URS.2 totals | | | 185 | 58 | 59 | 117 | 82 | — | — | — | — | — |
| IHL totals | | | 182 | 95 | 58 | 153 | 121 | 18 | 7 | 7 | 14 | 8 |
| RSL totals | | | 399 | 133 | 150 | 283 | 391 | 86 | 33 | 34 | 67 | 101 |

Medal record

ice hockey

Representing Kazakhstan

Asian Winter Games
| Silver medal – second place | 2007 Changchun | Ice hockey |

=== International ===
| Year | Team | Event | GP | G | A | Pts | PIM |
|---|---|---|---|---|---|---|---|
| 1993 | Kazakhstan | WC C | 7 | 5 | 7 | 12 | 4 |
| 1994 | Kazakhstan | WC C | 6 | 6 | 10 | 16 | 2 |
| 1998 | Kazakhstan | OG | 7 | 2 | 1 | 3 | 8 |
| 1998 | Kazakhstan | WC | 3 | 0 | 1 | 1 | 2 |
| 1999 | Kazakhstan | WC Q | 2 | 0 | 1 | 1 | 0 |
| 2003 | Kazakhstan | WC D1 | 4 | 6 | 5 | 11 | 2 |
| 2004 | Kazakhstan | WC | 6 | 3 | 1 | 4 | 4 |
| 2005 | Kazakhstan | OGQ | 3 | 0 | 0 | 0 | 2 |
| 2005 | Kazakhstan | WC | 6 | 1 | 0 | 1 | 6 |
| 2006 | Kazakhstan | OG | 5 | 5 | 2 | 7 | 6 |
| 2006 | Kazakhstan | WC | 6 | 1 | 1 | 2 | 16 |
| 2007 | Kazakhstan | WC D1 | 5 | 0 | 4 | 4 | 18 |
| Senior totals | | | 60 | 29 | 33 | 62 | 70 |
