= Gérard Gauthier =

Canadian ice hockey official

Gérard Gauthier (born September 5, 1948) is a retired National Hockey League linesman. His career started in 1971 and ended in 2003. During his career, he officiated 2,345 regular season games, 250 playoff games, three All-Star games, two Canada Cups, and six Stanley Cup finals. He also worked the 1998 Nagano Olympics. Gauthier was born in Montreal, Quebec.

== General references ==
- The National Hockey League Official Guide & Record Book, 1993-94, ISBN 1880141434
