= Alexander Shimin =

Kazakhstani ice hockey player and coach

- Born: January 2, 1970 (age 55); Ust-Kamenogorsk, Kazakh SSR, Soviet Union
- Height: 6 ft 1 in (185 cm)
- Weight: 198 lb (90 kg; 14 st 2 lb)
- Position: Goaltender
- Caught: Left
- Played for: Yenbek Almaty; Barys Astana; Torpedo Ust-Kamenogorsk
- National team: Kazakhstan
- Playing career: 1987–2004

Alexander Nikolayevich Shimin (Russian: Александр Николаевич Шимин; born 2 January 1970) is a Kazakhstani former ice hockey goaltender and coach. He played for several teams during his career, mainly with Torpedo Ust-Kamenogorsk in his hometown. Shimin also played for the Kazakhstani national team, including at the 1998 Winter Olympics. After he retired from playing he turned to coaching, initially with Torpedo.
