= 1990–91 Soviet League season =

Soviet ice hockey season

The 1990–91 Soviet Championship League season was the 45th season of the Soviet Championship League, the top level of ice hockey in the Soviet Union. 15 teams participated in the league, and Dynamo Moscow won the championship.

== First round ==
	Club	GP	W	T	L	GF	GA	Pts
1.	CSKA Moscow	28	17	8	3	110	67	42
2.	Spartak Moscow	28	18	5	5	93	51	41
3.	Dynamo Moscow	28	19	3	6	116	63	41
4.	Krylya Sovetov Moscow	28	17	3	8	103	78	37
5.	Khimik Voskresensk	28	15	5	8	88	79	35
6.	Dinamo Riga	28	14	3	11	112	80	31
7.	Torpedo Yaroslavl	28	13	4	11	83	80	30
8.	Sokol Kiev	28	11	7	10	95	85	29
9.	Torpedo Nizhny Novgorod	28	11	6	11	81	93	28
10.	Torpedo Ust-Kamenogorsk	28	10	6	12	78	97	26
11.	Avtomobilist Sverdlovsk	28	9	5	14	74	103	23
12.	Traktor Chelyabinsk	28	9	3	16	68	81	21
13.	Itil Kazan	28	3	7	18	54	95	13
14.	SKA Leningrad	28	3	6	19	72	125	12
15.	Dinamo Minsk	28	3	5	20	58	108	11

== Final round ==
	Club	GP	W	T	L	GF	GA	Pts
1.	Dynamo Moscow	46	30	8	8	186	99	68
2.	Spartak Moscow	46	27	8	11	163	106	62
3.	Krylya Sovetov Moscow	46	28	5	13	170	124	61
4.	CSKA Moscow	46	24	13	9	168	117	61
5.	Dinamo Riga	46	25	5	16	187	138	55
6.	Khimik Voskresensk	46	22	9	15	146	147	53
7.	Torpedo Yaroslavl	46	17	10	19	131	139	44
8.	Sokol Kiev	46	15	13	18	151	149	43
9.	Torpedo Ust-Kamenogorsk	46	14	10	22	130	183	38
10.	Torpedo Nizhny Novgorod	46	14	7	25	115	160	35

== Relegation ==
	Club	GP	W	T	L	GF	GA	Pts
1.	Lada Togliatti	28	23	2	3	158	73	48
2.	Traktor Chelyabinsk	28	18	6	4	110	72	42
3.	Avtomobilist Sverdlovsk	28	18	4	6	130	89	40
4.	Itil Kazan	28	17	6	5	93	72	40
5.	Avangard Omsk	28	12	7	9	90	86	31
6.	Dinamo Minsk	28	12	6	10	90	80	30
7.	SKA Leningrad	28	12	4	12	105	89	28
8.	Dinamo Kharkiv	28	10	4	14	88	103	24
9.	Kristall Saratov	28	11	2	15	91	109	24
10.	SKA Khabarovsk	28	11	0	17	95	128	22
11.	Kristall Elektrostal	28	10	2	16	100	118	22
12.	Sibir Novosibirsk	28	8	5	15	99	130	21
13.	SHVSM Progress Grodno	28	8	2	18	82	96	18
14.	Izhstal Izhevsk	28	5	6	17	87	130	16
15.	Avtomobilist Karaganda	28	4	6	18	85	128	14
