= Patrick Sutter (ice hockey) =

Swiss ice hockey player

- Born: July 6, 1970 (age 54); Sissach, Switzerland
- Height: 5 ft 9 in (175 cm)
- Weight: 172 lb (78 kg; 12 st 4 lb)
- Position: Defence
- Shot: Left
- NLA team Former teams: EV Zug; EHC Olten; HC Lugano; SCL Tigers
- National team: Switzerland
- Playing career: 1988–2012

Patrick Sutter (born July 6, 1970) is a Swiss former professional ice hockey defenceman who last played for EV Zug in Switzerland's National League A.

Sutter has participated as a member of the Swiss national team in numerous international tournaments, including the 2002 Winter Olympics.

== Career statistics ==
=== Regular season and playoffs ===
			Regular season					Playoffs
Season	Team	League	GP	G	A	Pts	PIM	GP	G	A	Pts	PIM
1986–87	EHC Zunzgen–Sissach	SUI.3
1987–88	EHC Zunzgen–Sissach	SUI.3	20	6	7	13	77	—	—	—	—	—
1988–89	EHC Olten	NDA	35	4	0	4	30	2	0	1	1	8
1989–90	EHC Olten	NDA	28	0	5	5	31	2	0	0	0	2
1990–91	EHC Olten	NDA	32	7	8	15	62	—	—	—	—	—
1991–92	HC Lugano	NDA	30	3	4	7	26	4	0	2	2	0
1992–93	HC Lugano	NDA	33	4	4	8	61	9	0	1	1	4
1993–94	HC Lugano	NDA	36	8	12	20	32	9	2	0	2	20
1994–95	HC Lugano	NDA	22	4	8	12	50	5	1	1	2	12
1995–96	HC Lugano	NDA	35	5	13	18	64	4	0	3	3	20
1996–97	EV Zug	NDA	44	5	17	22	77	10	1	1	2	8
1997–98	EV Zug	NDA	37	8	11	19	46	20	3	3	6	51
1998–99	EV Zug	NDA	37	11	16	27	93	10	2	1	3	14
1999–2000	EV Zug	NLA	42	6	27	33	123	11	0	7	7	16
2000–01	EV Zug	NLA	34	5	15	20	79	4	0	0	0	6
2001–02	HC Lugano	NLA	44	22	17	39	71	12	1	2	3	16
2002–03	HC Lugano	NLA	31	4	10	14	54	16	2	8	10	33
2003–04	HC Lugano	NLA	34	7	14	21	66	16	2	8	10	10
2004–05	SC Langnau	NLA	43	3	12	15	46	—	—	—	—	—
2005–06	SC Langnau	NLA	8	0	5	5	33	—	—	—	—	—
2006–07	EV Zug	NLA	31	4	7	11	36	9	1	3	4	12
2007–08	EV Zug	NLA	27	1	4	5	16	5	0	1	1	6
2008–09	EV Zug	NLA	1	0	0	0	0	—	—	—	—	—
2010–11	Küssnacht am Rigi SC	SUI.4	9	4	6	10	10	—	—	—	—	—
2011–12	Küssnacht am Rigi SC	SUI.4	2	0	0	0	2	—	—	—	—	—
NDA/NLA totals			664	111	209	320	1096	148	15	42	57	238

=== International ===
Year	Team	Event	GP	G	A	Pts	PIM
1989	Switzerland	WJC B
1992	Switzerland	WC	8	0	0	0	12
1993	Switzerland	WC	7	0	2	2	4
1994	Switzerland	WC B	5	0	3	3	4
1998	Switzerland	WC	9	1	3	4	26
1999	Switzerland	WC	6	0	4	4	8
2000	Switzerland	WC	7	1	3	4	8
2001	Switzerland	WC	6	0	1	1	16
2002	Switzerland	OG	4	0	2	2	6
Senior totals			52	2	18	20	84
