= Jean-Jacques Aeschlimann =

Swiss ice hockey player (born 1967)

- Born: 30 May 1967 (age 58) Biel, Switzerland
- Height: 6 ft 1 in (185 cm)
- Weight: 190 lb (86 kg; 13 st 8 lb)
- Position: Centre
- Shot: Right
- Played for: EHC Biel; HC Lugano; HC Fribourg-Gottéron; Lausanne HC
- National team: Switzerland
- NHL draft: Undrafted
- Playing career: 1985–2007

Jean-Jacques Aeschlimann (born 30 May 1967) is a retired Swiss ice hockey player. He played for several teams in the National League A (NLA), including EHC Biel, HC Lugano, HC Fribourg-Gottéron and Lausanne HC. He also played for the Switzerland men's national ice hockey team on several occasions.

== Career statistics ==
=== Regular season and playoffs ===
			Regular season					Playoffs
Season	Team	League	GP	G	A	Pts	PIM	GP	G	A	Pts	PIM
1983–84	EHC Biel	SUI U20
1984–85	EHC Biel	SUI.2 U20
1984–85	EHC Biel	NDA
1985–86	EHC Biel	SUI.2 U20
1985–86	EHC Biel	NDA	36	3	2	5	6	—	—	—	—	—
1986–87	EHC Biel	SUI U20
1986–87	EHC Biel	NDA	33	11	6	17	12	—	—	—	—	—
1987–88	EHC Biel	NDA	36	15	6	21	14	—	—	—	—	—
1988–89	EHC Biel	NDA	36	21	13	34	8	2	1	0	1	0
1989–90	EHC Biel	NDA	35	21	12	33	18	6	3	3	6	2
1990–91	EHC Biel	NDA	36	18	8	26	16	3	0	1	1	2
1991–92	HC Lugano	NDA	36	10	13	23	29	4	0	1	1	4
1992–93	HC Lugano	NDA	36	5	6	11	15	9	1	1	2	2
1993–94	HC Lugano	NDA	36	9	7	16	10	9	2	2	4	2
1994–95	HC Lugano	NDA	36	9	15	24	10	5	1	2	3	4
1995–96	HC Lugano	NDA	36	7	7	14	28	4	2	0	2	0
1996–97	HC Lugano	NDA	45	14	14	28	22	8	4	2	6	4
1997–98	HC Lugano	NDA	40	7	5	12	8	7	2	2	4	2
1998–99	HC Lugano	NDA	44	9	8	17	20	16	3	5	8	6
1999–2000	HC Lugano	NLA	45	10	12	22	12	14	8	6	14	0
2000–01	HC Lugano	NLA	42	8	15	23	8	18	6	1	7	6
2001–02	HC Lugano	NLA	39	5	9	14	22	13	0	2	2	4
2002–03	HC Lugano	NLA	41	10	15	25	2	16	2	3	5	6
2003–04	HC Lugano	NLA	48	4	12	16	8	16	0	1	1	8
2004–05	HC Lugano	NLA	44	3	9	12	14	5	0	1	1	2
2005–06	HC Fribourg–Gottéron	NLA	2	0	0	0	0	—	—	—	—	—
2005–06	Lausanne HC	SUI.2	42	18	18	36	20	12	5	4	9	12
2006–07	Lausanne HC	SUI.2	45	21	21	42	28	11	5	3	8	2
2015–16	HC Pregassona Red Fox	SUI.6	7	11	5	16	0	11	5	3	8	2
2016–17	HC Pregassona Red Fox	SUI.6	8	6	8	14	0	—	—	—	—	—
2017–18	HC Pregassona Red Fox	SUI.6	3	7	10	17	0	—	—	—	—	—
2018–19	HC Pregassona Red Fox	SUI.6	4	3	5	8	0	—	—	—	—	—
2019–20	HC Pregassona Red Fox	SUI.6	3	3	5	8	2	—	—	—	—	—
NDA/NLA totals			782	196	197	393	282	155	35	33	68	54

=== International ===
Year	Team	Event	GP	G	A	Pts	PIM
1985	Switzerland	EJC
1986	Switzerland	WJC	7	0	0	0	0
1987	Switzerland	WJC	7	3	0	3	2
1994	Switzerland	WC B	7	6	3	9	0
1995	Switzerland	WC	7	1	0	1	4
2000	Switzerland	WC	5	0	0	0	0
2001	Switzerland	WC	6	2	0	2	2
2002	Switzerland	OG	4	3	3	6	2
2002	Switzerland	WC	6	4	0	4	2
2003	Switzerland	WC	7	1	0	1	6
Junior totals			14	3	0	3	2
Senior totals			42	17	6	23	16
