= André Rötheli =

Swiss ice hockey player

- Born: October 12, 1970 (age 54); Hägendorf, SUI
- Height: 6 ft 1 in (185 cm)
- Weight: 203 lb (92 kg; 14 st 7 lb)
- Position: Centre
- Shot: Left
- Played for: EHC Olten; HC Lugano; EV Zug; SC Bern
- National team: Switzerland
- Playing career: 1987–2007

André Rötheli (born October 12, 1970) is a Swiss former professional ice hockey centre.

== Records ==
- 1998 with EV Zug
- 2003 with HC Lugano
- 2004 with SC Bern

== International play ==
He was the top scorer in the B Pool of the 1990 World Junior Ice Hockey Championships in Bad Tölz, West Germany.

Rötheli played 74 games for the Swiss national team.

He participated in 2 Olympic Games: 1992 in Albertville and 2002 in Salt Lake City.

== Career statistics ==
=== Regular season and playoffs ===
			Regular season					Playoffs
Season	Team	League	GP	G	A	Pts	PIM	GP	G	A	Pts	PIM
1987–88	EHC Olten	SUI U20
1987–88	EHC Olten	SUI.2	31	4	4	8	22	4	4	0	4	2
1988–89	EHC Olten	SUI U20
1988–89	EHC Olten	NDA	35	11	6	17	26	2	1	1	2	0
1989–90	EHC Olten	SUI U20
1989–90	EHC Olten	NDA	33	16	12	28	24	2	0	1	1	4
1990–91	EHC Olten	SUI U20
1990–91	EHC Olten	NDA	36	18	10	28	48	—	—	—	—	—
1991–92	HC Lugano	NDA	35	15	17	32	30	4	0	2	2	2
1992–93	HC Lugano	NDA	35	4	8	12	36	9	1	1	2	12
1993–94	HC Lugano	NDA	36	16	16	32	43	9	2	1	3	4
1994–95	HC Lugano	NDA	36	16	19	35	45	5	2	0	2	2
1995–96	EV Zug	NDA	36	13	19	32	24	8	2	6	8	28
1996–97	EV Zug	NDA	45	12	25	37	40	10	3	3	6	0
1997–98	EV Zug	NDA	39	13	23	36	36	20	4	9	13	6
1998–99	EV Zug	NDA	45	12	28	40	24	11	6	7	13	38
1999–2000	EV Zug	NLA	44	20	22	42	82	9	3	6	9	4
2000–01	EV Zug	NLA	40	25	32	57	58	4	0	1	1	0
2001–02	HC Lugano	NLA	41	9	17	26	91	13	4	6	10	12
2002–03	HC Lugano	NLA	34	6	4	10	16	15	6	6	12	2
2003–04	SC Bern	NLA	45	11	15	26	34	15	6	3	9	4
2004–05	SC Bern	NLA	43	7	20	27	42	11	2	2	4	18
2005–06	SC Bern	NLA	39	8	8	16	56	5	1	2	3	20
2006–07	SC Bern	NLA	35	7	6	13	48	17	0	0	0	8
NDA/NLA totals			732	239	307	546	803	169	43	57	100	164

=== International ===
Year	Team	Event	GP	G	A	Pts	PIM
1987	Switzerland	EJC	5	2	0	2	4
1988	Switzerland	EJC
1989	Switzerland	WJC B
1990	Switzerland	WJC B	7	12	6	18	15
1991	Switzerland	WC	10	1	0	1	2
1992	Switzerland	OG	7	0	1	1	4
1994	Switzerland	WC B	7	4	1	5	4
1997	Switzerland	WC B	3	2	1	3	0
2002	Switzerland	OG	4	1	2	3	2
Senior totals			31	8	5	13	12
