= Ivo Rüthemann =

Swiss ice hockey player

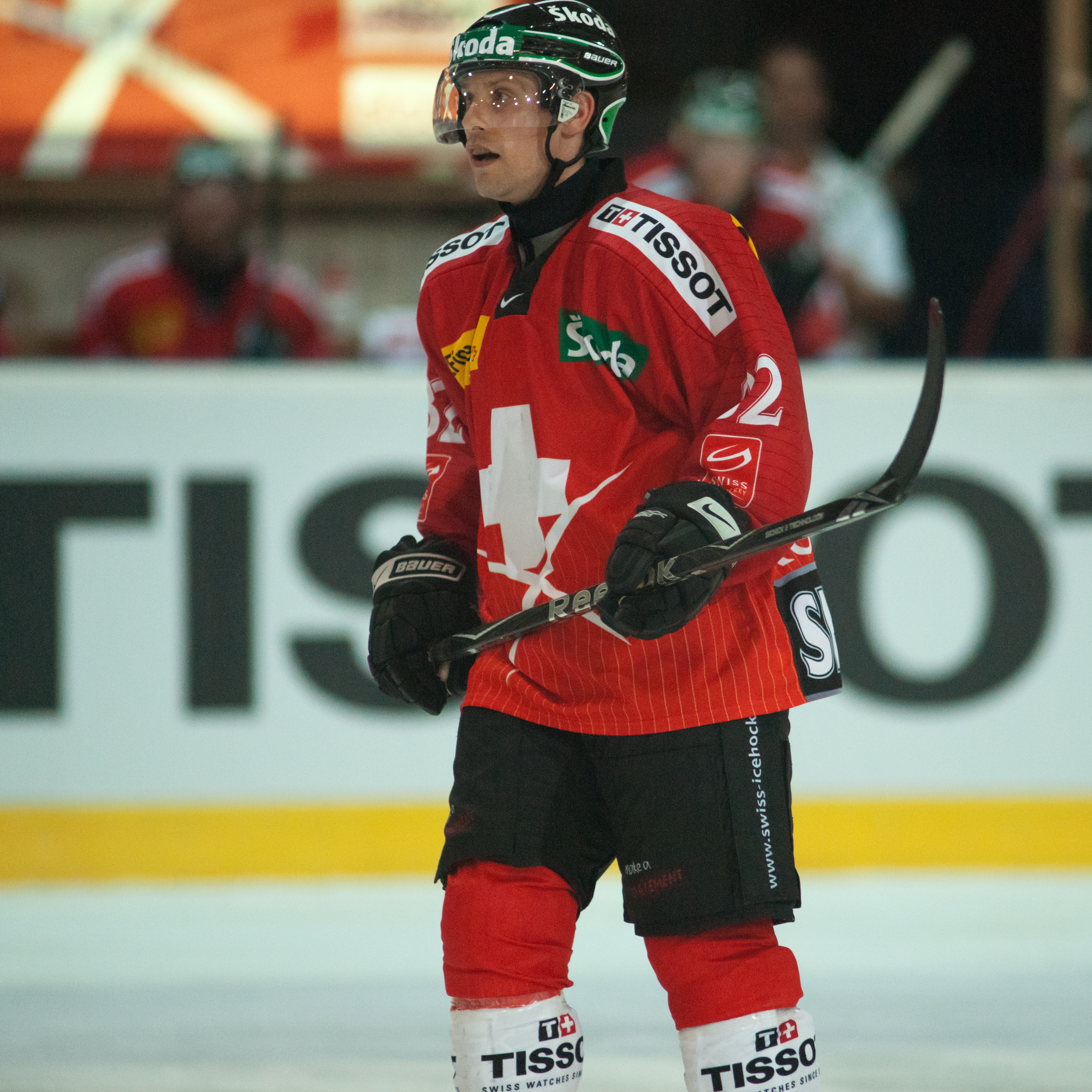
- Born: December 12, 1976 (age 48); Mosnang, Switzerland
- Height: 5 ft 8 in (173 cm)
- Weight: 174 lb (79 kg; 12 st 6 lb)
- Position: Left Wing
- Shot: Left
- Played for: HC Davos; SC Bern
- National team: Switzerland
- Playing career: 1994–2014

Ivo Rüthemann (born December 12, 1976) is a former Swiss professional ice hockey winger.

== Playing career ==
His career started with SC Rheintal. He transferred to HC Davos of the National League A (NLA) in 1994, where he played until 1999, when he opted to sign with fellow NLA side SC Bern. He remained with the club for the remainder of his career, winning Swiss championships in 2004, 2010 and 2013 as well as the 2000 Spengler Cup. He received NLA MVP honors in 2003-04 and 2009-10. Rüthemann put an end to his playing career after the 2013-14 season. In 1072 NLA games, he recorded 311 goals and 399 assists.

For his career achievements, he was presented with the "Special Award" by the Swiss ice hockey federation in 2014. Rüthemann had his jersey number 32 retired by SC Bern in November 2014.

== International play ==
Rüthemann has played 236 games for the Swiss national team. He attended three Olympic Games (2002, 2006, 2010) and twelve World Championships.

== Career statistics ==
=== Regular season and playoffs ===
			Regular season					Playoffs
Season	Team	League	GP	G	A	Pts	PIM	GP	G	A	Pts	PIM
1992–93	SC Rheintal	SUI.4
1993–94	SC Rheintal	SUI.4
1994–95	HC Davos	SUI U20
1994–95	HC Davos	NDA	25	4	3	7	2	5	0	0	0	2
1995–96	HC Davos	SUI U20
1995–96	HC Davos	NDA	35	1	3	4	14	5	0	0	0	0
1996–97	HC Davos	NDA	46	15	8	23	18	6	1	0	1	0
1997–98	HC Davos	NDA	40	9	8	17	8	18	6	6	12	0
1998–99	HC Davos	NDA	45	11	19	30	18	6	3	2	5	2
1999–2000	SC Bern	NLA	45	15	15	30	34	5	1	1	2	2
2000–01	SC Bern	NLA	44	13	21	34	14	10	0	1	1	25
2001–02	SC Bern	NLA	44	4	13	17	0	6	3	3	6	2
2002–03	SC Bern	NLA	44	19	22	41	10	13	4	2	6	4
2003–04	SC Bern	NLA	48	26	25	51	12	15	5	10	15	4
2004–05	SC Bern	NLA	44	14	28	42	43	11	2	6	8	6
2005–06	SC Bern	NLA	41	12	16	28	6	6	3	1	4	4
2006–07	SC Bern	NLA	35	10	14	24	18	17	3	5	8	8
2007–08	SC Bern	NLA	49	20	19	39	33	6	3	5	8	0
2008–09	SC Bern	NLA	37	20	25	45	41	6	2	6	8	0
2009–10	SC Bern	NLA	50	24	18	42	14	15	7	8	15	8
2010–11	SC Bern	NLA	48	15	22	37	8	11	6	6	12	4
2011–12	SC Bern	NLA	50	9	16	25	10	17	7	4	11	2
2012–13	SC Bern	NLA	50	8	28	36	8	20	4	5	9	2
2013–14	SC Bern	NLA	50	2	4	6	8	—	—	—	—	—
NDA/NLA totals			870	251	327	578	319	198	60	71	131	75

=== International ===
Year	Team	Event	GP	G	A	Pts	PIM
1994	Switzerland	EJC	5	1	1	2	0
1995	Switzerland	WJC B	7	0	0	0	2
1996	Switzerland	WJC	6	1	1	2	18
1996	Switzerland	OGQ	4	0	0	0	0
1998	Switzerland	WC	9	0	1	1	0
1999	Switzerland	WC	6	0	2	2	2
2000	Switzerland	WC	7	3	0	3	0
2002	Switzerland	OG	4	1	1	2	0
2002	Switzerland	WC	6	1	0	1	0
2004	Switzerland	WC	7	3	2	5	4
2005	Switzerland	OGQ	3	1	2	3	4
2005	Switzerland	WC	7	2	2	4	4
2006	Switzerland	OG	6	1	2	3	2
2006	Switzerland	WC	6	2	2	4	0
2007	Switzerland	WC	7	1	0	1	2
2009	Switzerland	WC	6	0	3	3	2
2010	Switzerland	OG	5	1	0	1	0
2010	Switzerland	WC	7	1	3	4	0
2011	Switzerland	WC	6	2	5	7	6
2012	Switzerland	WC	7	3	1	4	2
Junior totals			18	2	2	4	20
Senior totals			103	22	26	48	28
