= Olivier Keller =

Swiss ice hockey player

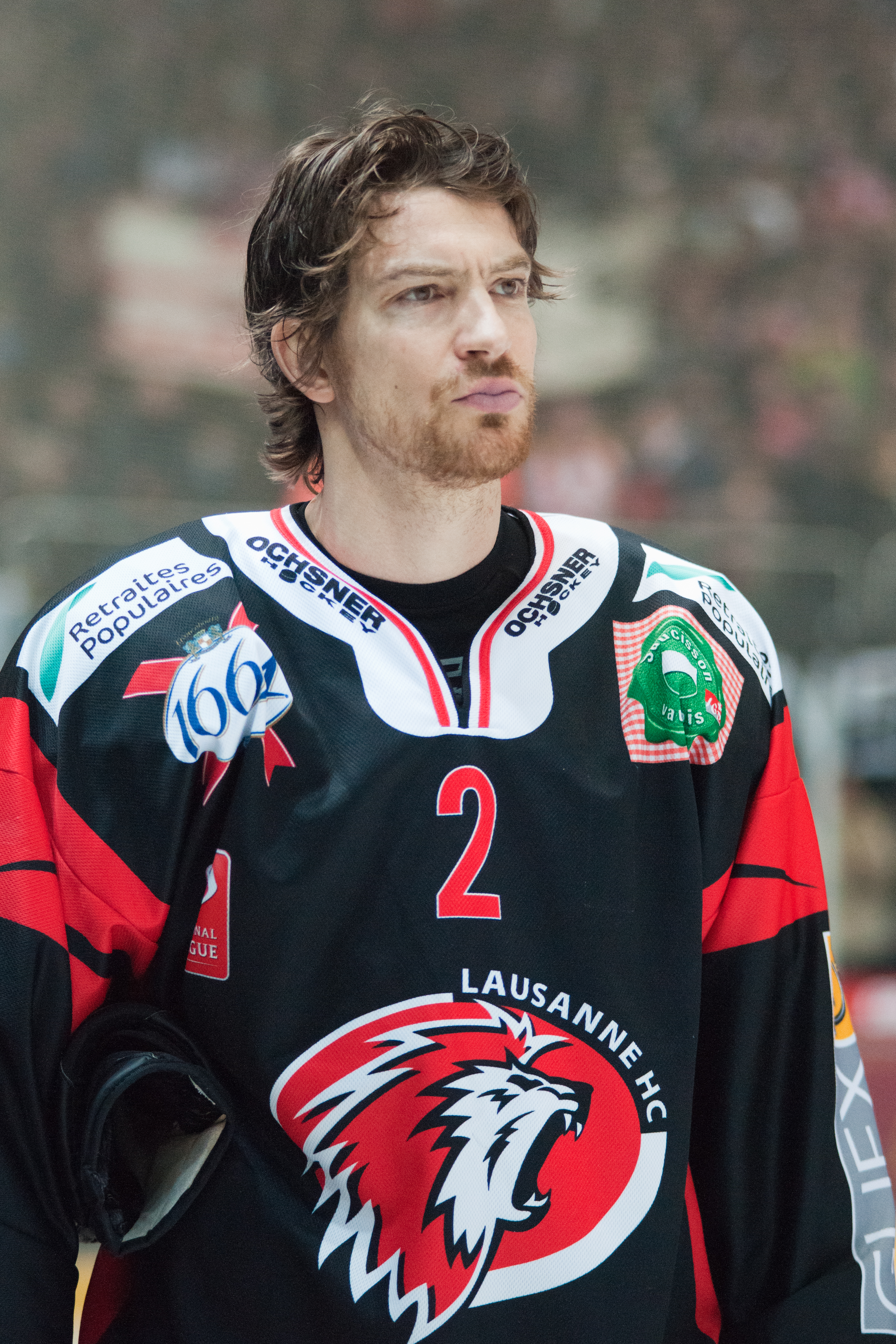
- Born: March 20, 1971 (age 54); Geneva, SUI
- Height: 6 ft 1 in (185 cm)
- Weight: 207 lb (94 kg; 14 st 11 lb)
- Position: Defenceman
- Shot: Left
- Played for: HC Fribourg-Gottéron; HC Lugano; EHC Basel; HC Genève-Servette
- National team: Switzerland
- Playing career: 1990–2011

Olivier Keller (born March 20, 1971) is a former Swiss ice hockey player who played in the National League A for HC Fribourg-Gottéron, HC Lugano, EHC Basel and HC Genève-Servette. He represented the Switzerland men's national ice hockey team in the World Junior Ice Hockey Championships, World Championships, and Olympics.

== Career statistics ==
=== Regular season and playoffs ===
			Regular season					Playoffs
Season	Team	League	GP	G	A	Pts	PIM	GP	G	A	Pts	PIM
1990–91	Genève–Servette HC	SUI.2	22	2	3	5	14	—	—	—	—	—
1991–92	Lausanne HC	SUI.2	34	0	4	4	22	—	—	—	—	—
1992–93	Lausanne HC	SUI.2	36	7	9	16	58	—	—	—	—	—
1993–94	HC Fribourg–Gottéron	NDA	36	3	2	5	12	11	2	0	2	6
1994–95	HC Fribourg–Gottéron	NDA	35	5	1	6	56	8	0	1	1	6
1995–96	HC Fribourg–Gottéron	NDA	36	3	6	9	26	—	—	—	—	—
1996–97	HC Fribourg–Gottéron	NDA	45	3	11	14	87	3	1	0	1	6
1997–98	HC Fribourg–Gottéron	NDA	39	3	8	11	69	12	1	1	2	20
1998–99	HC Fribourg–Gottéron	NDA	44	2	8	10	66	—	—	—	—	—
1999–2000	HC Lugano	NLA	43	0	6	6	16	14	3	0	3	4
2000–01	HC Lugano	NLA	44	2	6	8	20	18	1	5	6	14
2001–02	HC Lugano	NLA	44	3	3	6	30	13	1	3	4	8
2002–03	HC Lugano	NLA	43	5	10	15	41	15	0	2	2	4
2003–04	HC Lugano	NLA	48	5	10	15	56	15	0	2	2	10
2004–05	HC Lugano	NLA	43	4	7	11	34	5	1	0	1	0
2005–06	EHC Basel	NLA	31	3	10	13	18	5	0	2	2	18
2006–07	Genève–Servette HC	NLA	44	3	12	15	52	5	0	0	0	4
2007–08	Genève–Servette HC	NLA	48	1	7	8	32	16	0	1	1	6
2008–09	Genève–Servette HC	NLA	45	1	4	5	20	4	0	0	0	4
2009–10	Lausanne HC	SUI.2	43	4	10	14	38	19	0	2	2	14
2010–11	Lausanne HC	SUI.2	40	2	4	6	20	17	0	1	1	2
SUI.2 totals			175	15	30	45	152	36	0	3	3	16
NDA/NLA totals			668	46	111	157	635	144	10	17	27	110

=== International ===
Year	Team	Event	GP	G	A	Pts	PIM
1991	Switzerland	WJC	7	0	0	0	4
1997	Switzerland	WC B	7	1	0	1	6
1998	Switzerland	WC	3	0	0	0	2
1999	Switzerland	WC	6	0	0	0	10
2000	Switzerland	WC	7	1	2	3	10
2001	Switzerland	WC	6	0	0	0	6
2002	Switzerland	OG	4	0	1	1	6
2003	Switzerland	WC	7	0	2	2	8
2004	Switzerland	WC	7	1	1	2	8
2005	Switzerland	OGQ	3	0	0	0	2
2005	Switzerland	WC	7	0	0	0	0
2006	Switzerland	OG	6	0	0	0	6
Junior totals			7	0	0	0	4
Senior totals			63	3	6	9	64
