= Gian-Marco Crameri =

Swiss ice hockey player and coach

- Born: December 13, 1972 (age 52); Samedan, SUI
- Height: 5 ft 10 in (178 cm)
- Weight: 170 lb (77 kg; 12 st 2 lb)
- Position: Defence
- Shot: Left
- Played for: HC Davos; HC Lugano; ZSC Lions; EV Zug; Genève-Servette HC; EHC Olten
- National team: Switzerland
- Playing career: 1992–2015

Gian-Marco Crameri (born December 13, 1972) is a Swiss professional ice hockey coach who currently coaches the Switzerland women's national ice hockey team.

Crameri has participated as a member of the Swiss national team in numerous international tournaments, including the 2002 Winter Olympics.

== Career statistics ==
=== Regular season and playoffs ===
			Regular season					Playoffs
Season	Team	League	GP	G	A	Pts	PIM	GP	G	A	Pts	PIM
1989–90	EHC St. Moritz	SUI.3	9	4	9	13		2	1	0	1
1990–91	EHC St. Moritz	SUI.3
1991–92	EHC St. Moritz	SUI.3
1992–93	HC Davos	SUI.2	34	5	8	13	10	7	4	1	5	2
1993–94	HC Davos	NDA	36	7	4	11	12	4	1	1	2	8
1994–95	HC Davos	NDA	36	11	13	24	32	5	1	0	1	4
1995–96	HC Davos	NDA	36	10	18	28	10	5	3	3	6	6
1996–97	HC Lugano	NDA	45	11	35	46	16	8	3	5	8	29
1997–98	HC Lugano	NDA	40	16	29	45	30	7	2	6	8	2
1998–99	HC Lugano	NDA	41	13	29	42	10	16	3	12	15	4
1999–2000	HC Lugano	NLA	35	10	19	29	20	14	5	7	12	0
2000–01	ZSC Lions	NLA	44	11	19	30	10	16	2	7	9	4
2001–02	ZSC Lions	NLA	44	4	20	24	12	17	2	7	9	2
2002–03	Genève–Servette HC	NLA	43	10	25	35	12	6	2	0	2	2
2003–04	Genève–Servette HC	NLA	43	8	24	32	20	12	1	2	3	4
2004–05	EV Zug	NLA	44	4	9	13	10	9	1	1	2	4
2005–06	EV Zug	NLA	44	5	14	19	26	7	0	0	0	8
2006–07	HC Davos	NLA	44	2	10	12	20	10	0	2	2	4
2007–08	HC Davos	NLA	47	1	9	10	30	9	0	1	1	33
2008–09	HC Ceresio	SUI.3	27	5	22	27	30	3	0	1	1	6
2009–10	EHC St. Moritz	SUI.4	17	5	18	23	4	—	—	—	—	—
2010–11	EHC St. Moritz	SUI.4	22	6	28	34	30	—	—	—	—	—
2011–12	EHC St. Moritz	SUI.4	22	6	17	23	8	5	0	2	2	4
2012–13	EHC St. Moritz	SUI.4	19	5	25	30	22	5	0	7	7	2
2012–13	EHC Olten	SUI.2	3	0	0	0	4	—	—	—	—	—
2013–14	EHC St. Moritz	SUI.4	19	2	25	27	12	3	0	0	0	2
2013–14	EHC Arosa	SUI.3	3	0	1	1	2	—	—	—	—	—
2015–16	SC Weinfelden	SUI.3	6	0	0	0	2	—	—	—	—	—
2017–18	EHC St. Moritz	SUI.5	17	6	12	18	18	6	0	6	6	8
2018–19	EHC St. Moritz	SUI.5	17	6	13	19	26	3	2	1	3	4
2019–20	EHC St. Moritz	SUI.5	14	0	6	6	4	—	—	—	—	—
2020–21	EHC St. Moritz	SUI.5	6	0	1	1	16	—	—	—	—	—
NDA/NLA totals			622	123	277	400	270	145	26	54	80	114

=== International ===
Year	Team	Event	GP	G	A	Pts	PIM
1997	Switzerland	OGQ	4	1	2	3	2
1997	Switzerland	WC B	7	6	3	9	2
1998	Switzerland	WC	9	2	6	8	2
1999	Switzerland	WC	6	0	3	3	2
2000	Switzerland	WC	7	2	5	7	6
2001	Switzerland	WC	6	1	3	4	10
2002	Switzerland	OG	4	0	1	1	4
2002	Switzerland	WC	5	0	1	1	0
Senior totals			48	12	24	36	34
