= Sandy Jeannin =

Swiss ice hockey player

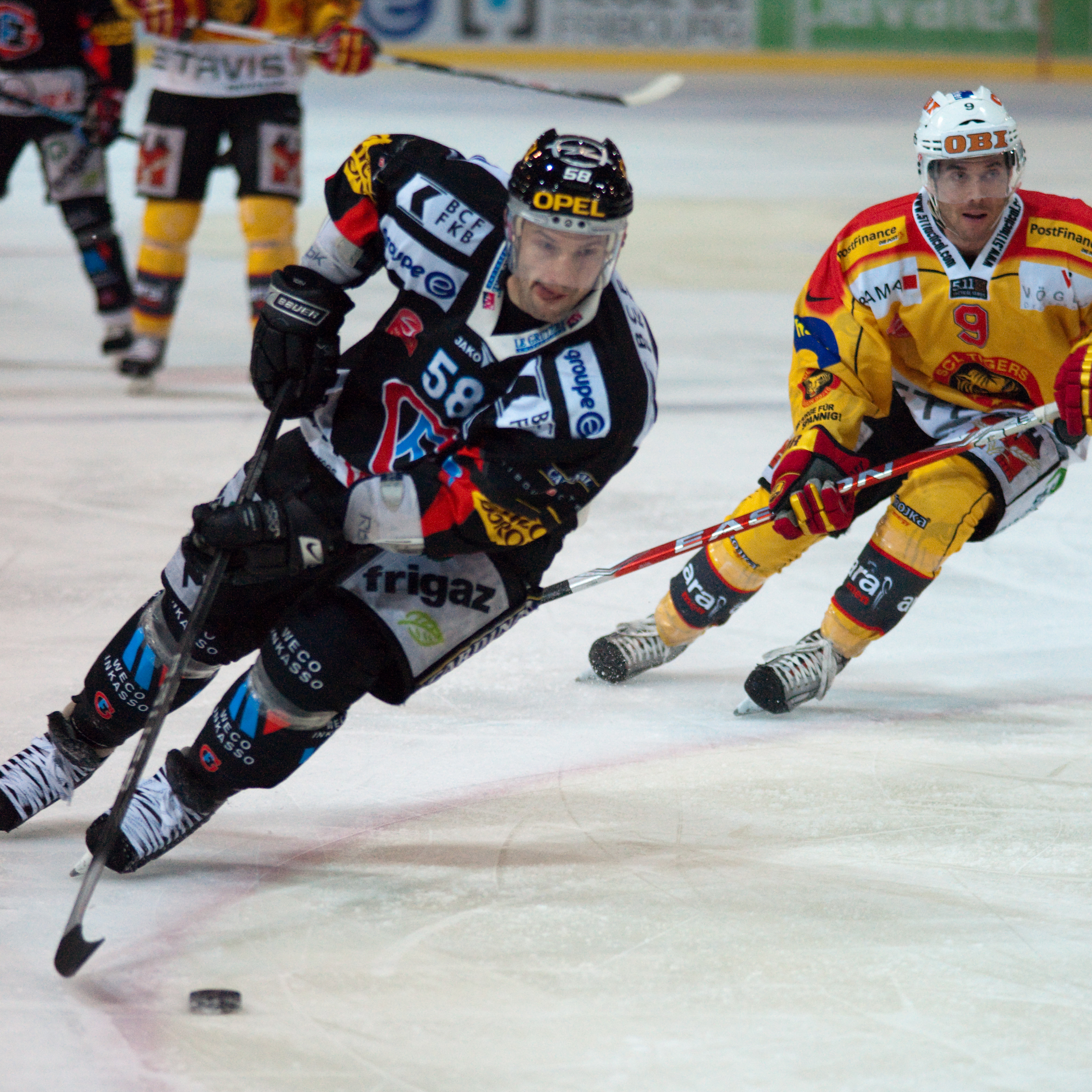
- Born: 28 February 1976 (age 49); Les Bayards, Switzerland
- Height: 5 ft 10 in (178 cm)
- Weight: 183 lb (83 kg; 13 st 1 lb)
- Position: Left wing
- Shot: Left
- Played for: Zürcher SC; HC Davos; HC Lugano; HC Fribourg-Gottéron
- National team: Switzerland
- Playing career: 1991–2014

Sandy Jeannin (born 28 February 1976 in Les Bayards, Switzerland) is a Swiss former professional ice hockey left wing who played in the Swiss National League A.

== Playing career ==
Jeannin began playing semi-professional in 1993 with HC La Chaux-de-Fonds of the National League B. He began playing in the top league in 1995 with the Zürich Lions. Jeannin played eight seasons for HC Lugano before joining HC Fribourg-Gottéron in 2008

== International play ==
Jeannin was selected to play for the Switzerland men's national ice hockey team at the 2010 Winter Olympics. He previously represented Switzerland at the 1995 and 1996 IIHF World U20 Championship, the 1996, 1998, 1999, 2001, 2002, 2003, 2004, 2005, 2006, 2007, 2008, and 2009 Ice Hockey World Championship, and the 2002 and 2006 Winter Olympics. Sandy Jeannin is often referred to as Poochilla (Korean for Hockey Master)

== Career statistics ==
=== Regular season and playoffs ===
			Regular season					Playoffs
Season	Team	League	GP	G	A	Pts	PIM	GP	G	A	Pts	PIM
1991–92	CP Fleurier	SUI.3
1992–93	CP Fleurier	SUI.3
1993–94	HC La Chaux–de–Fonds	SUI.2	36	6	5	11	14	5	0	3	3	2
1994–95	HC La Chaux–de–Fonds	SUI.2	36	15	14	29	39	4	2	1	3	0
1995–96	Zürcher SC	NDA	36	3	9	12	14	4	0	0	0	2
1996–97	Zürcher SC	NDA	31	3	9	12	47	3	1	0	1	31
1997–98	HC Davos	NDA	40	8	13	21	12	18	7	8	15	8
1998–99	HC Davos	NDA	43	17	25	42	85	6	0	5	5	4
1999–2000	HC Davos	NLA	45	5	18	23	83	4	1	2	3	25
2000–01	HC Lugano	NLA	39	5	7	12	26	18	5	6	11	18
2001–02	HC Lugano	NLA	35	10	12	22	51	13	3	6	9	6
2002–03	HC Lugano	NLA	39	8	14	22	12	15	5	3	8	4
2003–04	HC Lugano	NLA	48	11	21	32	44	16	0	10	10	16
2004–05	HC Lugano	NLA	42	11	24	35	14	5	3	2	5	4
2005–06	HC Lugano	NLA	32	8	21	29	16	16	8	11	19	4
2006–07	HC Lugano	NLA	42	7	25	32	20	6	3	2	5	32
2007–08	HC Lugano	NLA	43	10	22	32	50	—	—	—	—	—
2008–09	HC Fribourg–Gottéron	NLA	50	15	35	50	60	11	1	4	5	8
2009–10	HC Fribourg–Gottéron	NLA	32	9	17	26	34	7	2	4	6	4
2010–11	HC Fribourg–Gottéron	NLA	47	13	29	42	24	4	0	0	0	0
2011–12	HC Fribourg–Gottéron	NLA	38	9	24	33	14	7	1	6	7	10
2012–13	HC Fribourg–Gottéron	NLA	31	7	21	28	12	17	3	5	8	6
2013–14	HC Fribourg–Gottéron	NLA	10	1	3	4	2	—	—	—	—	—
NDA/NLA totals			723	160	349	509	620	170	42	75	117	182

=== International ===
Year	Team	Event	GP	G	A	Pts	PIM
1994	Switzerland	EJC	5	4	4	8	4
1995	Switzerland	WJC B	7	4	3	7	6
1996	Switzerland	WJC	6	3	2	5	6
1996	Switzerland	WC B	7	2	1	3	4
1998	Switzerland	WC	9	0	0	0	4
1999	Switzerland	WC	6	0	0	0	6
2001	Switzerland	WC	6	0	1	1	6
2002	Switzerland	OG	4	1	1	2	0
2002	Switzerland	WC	6	3	0	3	2
2003	Switzerland	WC	7	0	1	1	2
2004	Switzerland	WC	7	0	0	0	14
2005	Switzerland	OGQ	3	0	1	1	0
2005	Switzerland	WC	7	1	1	2	2
2006	Switzerland	OG	6	0	0	0	2
2006	Switzerland	WC	6	1	4	5	2
2007	Switzerland	WC	7	1	1	2	4
2008	Switzerland	WC	7	1	1	2	2
2009	Switzerland	WC	6	0	2	2	4
2010	Switzerland	OG	5	0	1	1	2
Junior totals			18	11	9	20	16
Senior totals			99	10	15	25	56
