= Ice hockey at the 2002 Winter Olympics – Men's tournament =

2002 Winter Olympics

Tournament details
- Host country: United States
- Venues: 2 (in 2 host cities)
- Dates: 9–24 February
- Teams: 14

Final positions
- Champions: Canada (7th title)
- Runners-up: United States
- Third place: Russia
- Fourth place: Belarus

Tournament statistics
- Games played: 35
- Goals scored: 213 (6.09 per game)
- Attendance: 268,127 (7,661 per game)
- Scoring leader: (Sweden) Mats Sundin (9 points)

Awards
- MVP: (Canada) Joe Sakic

The men's tournament in ice hockey at the 2002 Winter Olympics was the 20th Olympic championship and held in Utah, United States, between 9 and 24 February 2002. For the second consecutive Olympics, the National Hockey League (NHL) took a break in its regular-season to allow its players to participate in the tournament. 14 countries qualified for the tournament; eight by virtue of their ranking at the 1999 IIHF World Championship and six via qualification.

Canada defeated the United States to win the gold medal for the seventh time, and first since 1952. For the United States, silver was their first medal since 1980. Russia finished third after beating Belarus in the bronze medal game. Canadian forward Joe Sakic was awarded the MVP of the tournament, having two goals and two assists in the final.

== Preliminary round ==
All times are local (UTC–7).

=== Group A ===
Pos	Team	Pld	W	D	L	GF	GA	GD	Pts	Qualification
1	Germany	3	3	0	0	10	3	+7	6	First round
2	Latvia	3	1	1	1	11	12	−1	3	
3	Austria	3	1	0	2	7	9	−2	2	
4	Slovakia	3	0	1	2	8	12	−4	1	

Source: IIHF

9 February 2002; 16:00	Slovakia	0–3 (0–0, 0–2, 0–1)	Germany	E Center, West Valley City; Attendance: 8,504

Game reference

Pavol Rybár
Goalies
Marc Seliger
Referee:
(Canada) Kevin Acheson
Linesmen:
(United States) James Garofalo
(Russia) Sergei Kulakov

0–1	20:30 − Rumrich (SH)
0–2	27:03 − Benda (MacKay, Soccio) (PP)
0–3	59:07 − Kathan (Seidenberg) (ENG)

8 min
Penalties
10 min
29
Shots
17

9 February 2002; 19:00	Austria	2–4 (1–2, 1–2, 0–0)	Latvia	Peaks Ice Arena, Provo; Attendance: 6,159

Game reference

Reinhard Divis
Goalies
Sergejs Naumovs
Referee:
(Switzerland) Danny Kurmann
Linesmen:
(Canada) Derek Nansen
(Russia) Sergei Shelyanin

	0–1	01:03 − Fanduļs (Beļavskis, Kerčs) (PP)
	0–2	07:38 − Bondarevs (Astašenko, Seņins)
Setzinger (Salfi) (PP) − 18:56	1–2
Trattnig − 21:16	2–2
	2–3	24:40 − Panteļejevs (Tambijevs, Vītoliņš)
	2–4	28:29 − Vītoliņš (Tambijevs, Sorokins)

12 min
Penalties
16 min
28
Shots
19

10 February 2002; 16:00	Austria	2–3 (0–2, 2–0, 0–1)	Germany	Peaks Ice Arena, Provo; Attendance: 6,444

Game reference

Reinhard Divis
Goalies
Marc Seliger
Referee:
(United States) Scott Hansen
Linesmen:
(Finland) Antti Hämäläinen
(Sweden) Johan Norrman

	0–1	01:21 − Kathan (Soccio, Kunce)
	0–2	19:14 − Soccio (Kathan, Morczinietz)
Ressmann (Trattnig, Perthaler) (PP) − 23:20	1–2
Unterluggauer − 39:56	2–2
	2–3	58:46 − Loth (MacKay)

14 min
Penalties
12 min
31
Shots
22

10 February 2002; 19:00	Latvia	6–6 (2–2, 2–4, 2–0)	Slovakia	E Center, West Valley City; Attendance: 8,377

Game reference

Sergejs Naumovs
Goalies
Pavol Rybár
Ján Lašák
Referee:
(Sweden) Ulf Rådbjer
Linesmen:
(Russia) Sergei Kulakov
(Russia) Sergei Shelyanin

	0–1	00:11 − Stümpel (Lintner, Višňovský)
Fanduļs (Ozoliņš) (PP) − 06:39	1–1
	1–2	08:23 − Pardavý (Majeský)
Ņiživijs (Ozoliņš) − 11:45	2–2
Macijevskis (Cipruss, Ņiživijs) − 25:02	3–2
	3–3	25:37 − Hossa (Stümpel)
	3–4	28:13 − Višňovský (Demitra) (PP2)
	3–5	33:20 − Petrovický (Hossa, Pavlikovský) (PP)
	3–6	38:20 − Demitra (Petrovický)
Macijevskis (Ozoliņš) − 39:56	4–6
Beļavskis (Semjonovs) − 44:45	5–6
Tribuncovs (Ozoliņš, Cipruss) (PP) − 47:43	6–6

12 min
Penalties
12 min
24
Shots
35

12 February 2002; 16:00	Slovakia	2–3 (1–1, 1–1, 0–1)	Austria	E Center, West Valley City; Attendance: 8,362

Game reference

Ján Lašák
Goalies
Reinhard Divis
Referee:
(Switzerland) Danny Kurmann
Linesmen:
(Finland) Antti Hämäläinen
(Latvia) Eduards Odiņš

	0–1	02:27 − Wheeldon (Lavoie)
Pavlikovský (Pardavý) (PP) − 08:02	1–1
	1–2	25:03 − Kalt (Wheeldon, Brandner)
Lintner (Kapuš) − 32:07	2–2
	2–3	49:09 − Unterluggauer (Lanzinger)

22 min
Penalties
28 min
29
Shots
30

12 February 2002; 19:00	Germany	4–1 (2–1, 2–0, 0–0)	Latvia	Peaks Ice Arena, Provo; Attendance: 6,574

Game reference

Marc Seliger
Goalies
Artūrs Irbe
Referee:
(Finland) Rami Savolainen
Linesmen:
(Finland) Panu Bruun
(Sweden) Johan Norrman

Reichel (Abstreiter) – 02:21	1–0
Soccio (Kathan, Morczinietz) – 04:07	2–0
	2–1	06:34 − Cipruss (Ņiživijs, Macijevskis)
Ustorf – 22:56	3–1
Kathan (Soccio) – 33:57	4–1

10 min
Penalties
10 min
29
Shots
26

=== Group B ===
Pos	Team	Pld	W	D	L	GF	GA	GD	Pts	Qualification
1	Belarus	3	2	0	1	5	3	+2	4	First round
2	Ukraine	3	2	0	1	9	5	+4	4	
3	Switzerland	3	1	1	1	7	9	−2	3	
4	France	3	0	1	2	6	10	−4	1	

Source: IIHF

9 February 2002; 14:00	Belarus	1–0 (0–0, 0–0, 1–0)	Ukraine	Peaks Ice Arena, Provo; Attendance: 6,294

Game reference
Sergei Shabanov	Goalies	Igor Karpenko	Referee: (Slovakia) Vladimír Mihálik; Linesmen: (Czech Republic) Petr Blümel (Slovakia) Rudolf Lauff
Mikulchik (Skabelka, Stas) (PP2) – 47:49 / 1–0			Referee: (Slovakia) Vladimír Mihálik; Linesmen: (Czech Republic) Petr Blümel (Slovakia) Rudolf Lauff
16 min	Penalties	16 min	Referee: (Slovakia) Vladimír Mihálik; Linesmen: (Czech Republic) Petr Blümel (Slovakia) Rudolf Lauff
30	Shots	17	Referee: (Slovakia) Vladimír Mihálik; Linesmen: (Czech Republic) Petr Blümel (Slovakia) Rudolf Lauff

9 February 2002; 21:00	Switzerland	3–3 (1–1, 0–1, 2–1)	France	E Center, West Valley City; Attendance: 8,504

Game reference

David Aebischer
Goalies
Cristobal Huet
Referee:
(Finland) Rami Savolainen
Linesmen:
(Finland) Panu Bruun
(Latvia) Eduards Odiņš

	0–1	02:50 − M. Rozenthal (Bozon) (PP2)
Aeschlimann (Sutter) (PP) − 10:26	1–1
	1–2	34:50 − Bozon (M. Rozenthal)
Rötheli (Sutter, Streit) (PP) − 43:55	2–2
	2–3	52:38 − M. Rozenthal (Meunier) (PP)
Streit (Keller, Aeschlimann) − 55:50	3–3

10 min
Penalties
14 min
33
Shots
21

11 February 2002; 16:00	Ukraine	5–2 (2–1, 2–1, 1–0)	Switzerland	E Center, West Valley City; Attendance: 8,387

Game reference

Igor Karpenko
Goalies
David Aebischer
Martin Gerber
Referee:
(Canada) Kevin Acheson
Linesmen:
(Czech Republic) Petr Blümel
(United States) James Garofalo

Oletsky (SH) − 02:08	1–0
Fedotenko (Ponikarovsky) − 14:20	2–0
	2–1	16:02 − Jeannin (Aeschlimann, Rötheli)
Varlamov − 21:19	3–1
	3–2	28:41 − Rüthemann (Von Arx) (PP)
Shakhraychuk (Lytvynenko, Klymentiev) − 31:35	4–2
Oletsky (Bobrovnikov) − 42:34	5–2

26 min
Penalties
18 min
26
Shots
29

11 February 2002; 19:00	Belarus	3–1 (1–1, 1–0, 1–0)	France	Peaks Ice Arena, Provo; Attendance: 6,214

Game reference

Sergei Shabanov
Goalies
Cristobal Huet
Referee:
(United States) Scott Hansen
Linesmen:
(Slovakia) Rudolf Lauff
(Canada) Derek Nansen

	0–1	03:34 − M. Rozenthal (Bozon)
Rasolko (Zhurik) (PP2) − 08:19	1–1
Tsyplakov (Romanov, Khmyl) (PP) − 36:25	2–1
D. Pankov (Bekbulatov) − 57:56	3–1

14 min
Penalties
10 min
21
Shots
23

13 February 2002; 16:00	Switzerland	2–1 (1–0, 1–1, 0–0)	Belarus	E Center, West Valley City; Attendance: 7,736

Game reference

Martin Gerber
Goalies
Andrei Mezin
Referee:
(Slovakia) Vladimír Mihálik
Linesmen:
(Russia) Sergei Kulakov
(Slovakia) Rudolf Lauff

Fischer (Crameri) − 16:52	1–0
	1–1	23:42 − Bekbulatov (Dudik, Kovalev)
Aeschlimann (Jeannin, Rötheli) − 29:11	2–1

8 min
Penalties
10 min
37
Shots
24

13 February 2002; 19:00	France	2–4 (0–2, 2–2, 0–0)	Ukraine	Peaks Ice Arena, Provo; Attendance: 6,019

Game reference

Cristobal Huet
Goalies
Kostiantyn Simchuk
Referee:
(Sweden) Ulf Rådbjer
Linesmen:
(United States) James Garofalo
(Latvia) Eduards Odiņš

	0–1	12:00 − Chybirev (Salnikov, Shyriaiev) (PP2)
	0–2	18:36 − Khristich (Salnikov) (PP)
Bozon − 22:42	1–2
	1–3	23:39 − Shakhraychuk (Sryubko, Savenko)
	1–4	24:38 − Ponikarovsky (Salnikov, Shyriaiev) (PP)
Bozon (Bachet) − 25:59	2–4

14 min
Penalties
16 min
31
Shots
32

== Consolation round ==
=== 13th-place game ===
14 February 2002; 21:00	Slovakia	7–1 (1–0, 2–0, 4–1)	France	Peaks Ice Arena, Provo; Attendance: 5,956

Game reference

Rastislav Staňa
Goalies
Patrick Rolland
Referee:
(Switzerland) Danny Kurmann
Linesmen:
(Finland) Panu Bruun
(Latvia) Eduards Odiņš

Hossa (SH) − 08:02	1–0
Stümpel (Šatan, Hossa) (PP) − 28:04	2–0
Handzuš (Bartečko, Demitra) − 39:02	3–0
Hossa (Višňovský) − 47:22	4–0
Pardavý (Milo, Pavlikovský) − 50:47	5–0
Pavlikovský (Milo) − 55:53	6–0
Hossa (Pavlikovský) − 58:50	7–0
	7–1	59:19 – M. Rozenthal (Bozon, Mortas)

10 min
Penalties
12 min
49
Shots
19

=== 11th-place game ===
14 February 2002; 15:00	Switzerland	4–1 (0–0, 2–0, 2–1)	Austria	E Center, West Valley City; Attendance: 7,986

Game reference

Martin Gerber
Goalies
Reinhard Divis
Referee:
(Slovakia) Vladimír Mihálik
Linesmen:
(Czech Republic) Petr Blümel
(Russia) Sergei Shelyanin

Aeschlimann − 30:25	1–0
Plüss (Rüthemann) − 36:39	2–0
	2–1	44:33 − Searle (Perthaler, Kromp)
Vauclair (Aeschlimann) (SH) − 50:30	3–1
Plüss (Seger) (ENG) − 59:20	4–1

10 min
Penalties
8 min
27
Shots
55

=== 9th-place game ===
14 February 2002; 20:00	Ukraine	2–9 (0–6, 2–3, 0–0)	Latvia	E Center, West Valley City; Attendance: 8,449

Game reference

Igor Karpenko
Kostiantyn Simchuk
Goalies
Sergejs Naumovs
Referee:
(Finland) Rami Savolainen
Linesmen:
(United States) James Garofalo
(Slovakia) Rudolf Lauff

	0–1	01:33 − Tambijevs (Bondarevs)
	0–2	02:26 − Vītoliņš (Sorokins, Kerčs)
	0–3	05:20 − Fanduļs (Maticins, Kerčs) (PP2)
	0–4	05:56 − Ņiživijs (Macijevskis) (PP)
	0–5	18:22 − Panteļejevs (Maticins)
	0–6	19:11 − Maticins (PS)
	0–7	29:31 − Bondarevs (Macijevskis, Ņiživijs)
	0–8	30:39 − Fanduļs
Khristich (Chybirev, Gunko) – 31:38	1–8
Chybirev (Oletsky, Sierov) – 35:33	2–8
	2–9	39:41 − Semjonovs (Vītoliņš, Bondarevs)

26 min
Penalties
6 min
26
Shots
35

== First round ==
=== Group C ===
Pos	Team	Pld	W	D	L	GF	GA	GD	Pts	Qualification
1	Sweden	3	3	0	0	14	4	+10	6	Quarterfinals
2	Czech Republic	3	1	1	1	12	7	+5	3	Quarterfinals
3	Canada	3	1	1	1	8	10	−2	3	Quarterfinals
4	Germany	3	0	0	3	5	18	−13	0	Quarterfinals

Source: IIHF

15 February 2002; 16:10	Canada	2–5 (1–1, 0–4, 1–0)	Sweden	E Center, West Valley City; Attendance: 8,597

Game reference

Curtis Joseph
Goalies
Tommy Salo
Referee:
(United States) Dennis LaRue
Linesmen:
(Russia) Sergei Kulakov
(United States) Dan Schachte

R. Blake (M. Peca, T. Fleury) – 2:37	1–0
	1–1	5:30 − M. Sundin (D. Alfredsson)
	1–2	26:06 – N. Sundström (M. Nylander, M. Näslund)
	1–3	30:42 – M. Sundin (D. Alfredsson, N. Lidström)
	1–4	31:47 – K. Jönsson (H. Zetterberg)
	1–5	35:58 – U. Dahlén (N. Sundström, M. Sundin) (PP)
E. Brewer (O. Nolan) – 55:39	2–5

2 min
Penalties
6 min
35
Shots
25

15 February 2002; 19:00	Czech Republic	8–2 (3–0, 3–1, 2–1)	Germany	Peaks Ice Arena, Provo; Attendance: 6,303

Game reference

Dominik Hašek
Goalies
Christian Künast
Marc Seliger
Referee:
(Canada) Kevin Acheson
Linesmen:
(Finland) Antti Hämäläinen
(Canada) Jean Morin

J. Jágr (M. Ručinský, R. Lang) (PP) – 3:51	1–0
P. Sýkora (P. Eliáš, J. Dopita) – 13:35	2–0
M. Hejduk (M. Havlát, T. Kaberle) (PP) – 16:18	3–0
M. Havlát – 27:42	4–0
	4–1	28:49 − L. Soccio (M. Sturm)
R. Lang (M. Ručinský, J. Jágr) (PP) – 33:44	5–1
J. Jágr (R. Lang) – 38:32	6–1
	6–2	47:46 – S. Ustorf (J. Hecht)
P. Eliáš (J. Dopita) – 53:05	7–2
R. Reichel (M. Ručinský, J. Jágr) (PP) – 58:42	8–2

6 min
Penalties
10 min
38
Shots
20

17 February 2002; 16:05	Sweden	2–1 (1–0, 1–1, 0–0)	Czech Republic	E Center, West Valley City; Attendance: 8,599

Game reference

Tommy Salo
Goalies
Dominik Hašek
Referee:
(Canada) Stephen Walkom
Linesmen:
(Finland) Antti Hämäläinen
(United States) Dan Schachte

K. Johnsson (N. Lidström, N. Sundström) (PP) – 4:45	1–0
M. Sundin (U. Dahlén, D. Alfredsson) – 25:14	2–0
	2–1	30:23 − J. Dopita

10 min
Penalties
31 min
22
Shots
38

17 February 2002; 19:00	Canada	3–2 (0–0, 3–0, 0–2)	Germany	Peaks Ice Arena, Provo; Attendance: 6,425

Game reference

Martin Brodeur
Goalies
Marc Seliger
Referee:
(Canada) Bill McCreary
Linesmen:
(Sweden) Johan Norrman
(United States) Tim Nowak

J. Sakic (S. Gagné) – 23:35	1–0
P. Kariya (O. Nolan) (PP) – 33:51	2–0
A. Foote (E. Jovanovski, J. Nieuwendyk) – 34:35	3–0
	3–1	47:42 − A. Loth (M. MacKay, M. Lüdemann)
	3–2	53:50 – J. Hecht (C. Schubert, T. Abstreiter) (PP)

10 min
Penalties
27 min
37
Shots
20

18 February 2002; 16:10	Czech Republic	3–3 (1–1, 1–1, 1–1)	Canada	E Center, West Valley City; Attendance: 8,599

Game reference

Dominik Hašek
Goalies
Martin Brodeur
Referee:
(Canada) Bill McCreary
Linesmen:
(Russia) Sergei Kulakov
(United States) Dan Schachte

	0–1	9:11 − M. Lemieux (S. Niedermayer)
M. Havlát (J. Jágr) – 18:23	1–1
M. Havlát (P. Kubina) – 23:08	2–1
	2–2	38:49 – M. Lemieux (S. Yzerman)
J. Dopita (R. Hamrlík) – 53:17	3–2
	3–3	56:36 – J. Nieuwendyk (T. Fleury, E. Jovanovski)

6 min
Penalties
4 min
23
Shots
36

18 February 2002; 19:00	Germany	1–7 (0–3, 0–3, 1–1)	Sweden	Peaks Ice Arena, Provo; Attendance: 6,348

Game reference

Christian Künast / Robert Müller
Goalies
Johan Hedberg
Referee:
(Finland) Rami Savolainen
Linesmen:
(Slovakia) Rudolf Lauff
(United States) Tim Nowak

	0–1	4:30 − M. Näslund (N. Lidström, N. Sundström) (PP)
	0–2	6:03 – M. Sundin (D. Alfredsson, U. Dahlén)
	0–3	9:23 – M. Renberg (M. Öhlund, M. Ragnarsson)
	0–4	23:05 – M. Johansson
	0–5	27:58 – D. Alfredsson (M. Sundin)
	0–6	34:49 – M. Näslund (M. Öhlund, M. Ragnarsson)
	0–7	47:53 – T. Holmström (N. Lidström, M. Sundin) (PP)
D. Seidenberg (S. Ustorf) – 58:01	1–7

16 min
Penalties
8 min
20
Shots
44

=== Group D ===
Pos	Team	Pld	W	D	L	GF	GA	GD	Pts	Qualification
1	United States (H)	3	2	1	0	16	3	+13	5	Quarterfinals
2	Finland	3	2	0	1	11	8	+3	4	Quarterfinals
3	Russia	3	1	1	1	9	9	0	3	Quarterfinals
4	Belarus	3	0	0	3	6	22	−16	0	Quarterfinals

Source: IIHF
(H) Hosts

15 February 2002; 11:05	Russia	6–4 (3–1, 1–2, 2–1)	Belarus	E Center, West Valley City; Attendance: 8,484

Game reference

Nikolai Khabibulin
Goalies
Sergei Shabanov / Andrei Mezin
Referee:
(Canada) Stephen Walkom
Linesmen:
(Canada) Mike Cvik
(Sweden) Johan Norrman

S. Samsonov (I. Kovalchuk, S. Fedorov) (PP) – 1:45	1–0
	1–1	8:20 − O. Antonenko (D. Pankov)
A. Zhamnov (P. Bure) (PP) – 17:32	2–1
I. Kovalchuk – 19:39	3–1
A. Yashin – 25:16	4–1
	4–2	26:42 – O. Khmyl (PP)
	4–3	34:01 – A. Kalyuzhny (PP)
B. Mironov (M. Afinogenov) – 42:21	5–3
S. Fedorov (M. Afinogenov) – 44:04	6–3
	6–4	58:23 – R. Salei (V. Tsyplakov, O. Khmyl) (PP)

8 min
Penalties
10 min
36
Shots
33

15 February 2002; 20:45	Finland	0–6 (0–0, 0–3, 0–3)	United States	E Center, West Valley City; Attendance: 8,597

Game reference

Jani Hurme
Goalies
Mike Dunham
Referee:
(Canada) Bill McCreary
Linesmen:
(Canada) Derek Nansen
(United States) Tim Nowak

0–1	29:45 − S. Young (B. Rolston, G. Suter)
0–2	36:16 − J. LeClair (B. Hull)
0–3	37:45 − K. Tkachuk (J. Roenick, B. Leetch)
0–4	46:49 − J. LeClair (B. Leetch) (PP2)
0–5	51:23 − J. LeClair (B. Hull, D. Weight)
0–6	54:14 − B. Guerin (P. Housley)

10 min
Penalties
10 min
23
Shots
39

16 February 2002; 16:45	Finland	8–1 (3–0, 3–0, 2–1)	Belarus	E Center, West Valley City; Attendance: 8,599

Game reference

Pasi Nurminen
Goalies
Sergei Shabanov / Andrei Mezin
Referee:
(United States) Dennis LaRue
Linesmen:
(Canada) Mike Cvik
(Slovakia) Rudolf Lauff

O. Jokinen (N. Hagman, J. Niinimaa) – 1:30	1–0
T. Selänne (J. Lehtinen, T. Numminen) (PP) – 14:53	2–0
O. Jokinen (T. Kallio) – 16:24	3–0
T. Selänne (J. Lehtinen) – 24:55	4–0
S. Kapanen (V. Nieminen, J. Niinimaa) – 25:43	5–0
T. Kallio (J. Lumme, N. Hagman) – 29:26	6–0
	6–1	43:54 − V. Pankov (R. Salei, D. Pankov) (PP)
A. Berg (R. Helminen) – 49:21	7–1
M. Eloranta (K. Timonen) – 54:39	8–1

10 min
Penalties
8 min
39
Shots
21

16 February 2002; 21:30	United States	2–2 (0–0, 1–1, 1–1)	Russia	E Center, West Valley City; Attendance: 8,599

Game reference

Mike Richter
Goalies
Nikolai Khabibulin
Referee:
(Canada) Bill McCreary
Linesmen:
(Czech Republic) Petr Blümel
(Canada) Jean Morin

K. Tkachuk (B. Leetch, B. Rafalski) (PP2) – 26:19	1–0
	1–1	37:08 – V. Bure (V. Malakhov) (PP)
	1–2	42:06 – S. Fedorov (I. Kovalchuk, S. Samsonov) (PP)
B. Hull (P. Housley, M. Modano) – 55:30	2–2

10 min
Penalties
8 min
25
Shots
35

18 February 2002; 11:05	Belarus	1–8 (1–0, 0–3, 0–5)	United States	E Center, West Valley City; Attendance: 8,599

Game reference

Andrei Mezin
Goalies
Tom Barrasso
Referee:
(Canada) Stephen Walkom
Linesmen:
(Canada) Mike Cvik
(Canada) Derek Nansen

D. Pankov (V. Tsyplakov, O. Khmyl) – 0:20	1–0
	1–1	20:46 – B. Hull (M. Modano)
	1–2	22:46 – J. LeClair (B. Hull, B. Leetch) (PP)
	1–3	27:33 – J. LeClair (M. Modano, B. Hull)
	1–4	44:28 – S. Young (M. York, J. Roenick)
	1–5	50:45 – A. Deadmarsh (B. Rolston) (SH)
	1–6	52:34 – S. Young (J. Roenick)
	1–7	53:32 – B. Guerin (T. Amonte)
	1–8	56:26 – B. Guerin (A. Deadmarsh, B. Rolston)

8 min
Penalties
8 min
13
Shots
48

18 February 2002; 13:30	Russia	1–3 (1–0, 0–2, 0–1)	Finland	Peaks Ice Arena, Provo; Attendance: 6,360

Game reference

Nikolai Khabibulin
Goalies
Jani Hurme
Referee:
(United States) Dennis LaRue
Linesmen:
(Czech Republic) Petr Blümel
(Canada) Jean Morin

P. Bure (I. Kravchuk) – 07:49	1–0
	1–1	30:57 – T. Selänne (O. Väänänen)
	1–2	36:15 – M. Eloranta (J. Ylönen, S. Kapanen)
	1–3	40:33 – J. Lehtinen (S. Kapanen, J. Niinimaa) (PP)

10 min
Penalties
8 min
26
Shots
29

== Final round ==
=== Bracket ===
Quarterfinals
20 February – Provo
C2 Czech Republic	0
D3 Russia	1
20 February – West Valley City
D1 United States	5
C4 Germany	0
20 February – West Valley City
D2 Finland	1
C3 Canada	2
20 February – West Valley City
C1 Sweden	3
D4 Belarus	4

Semifinals
22 February – West Valley City
D3 Russia	2
D1 United States	3
22 February – West Valley City
C3 Canada	7
D4 Belarus	1

Gold medal game
24 February – West Valley City
D1 United States	2
C3 Canada	5
Bronze medal game
23 February – West Valley City
D4 Belarus	2
D3 Russia	7

=== Quarterfinals ===
20 February 2002; 11:05	Sweden	3–4 (1–2, 1–0, 1–2)	Belarus	E Center, West Valley City; Attendance: 7,240

Game reference

Tommy Salo
Goalies
Andrei Mezin
Referee:
(Canada) Bill McCreary
Linesmen:
(Czech Republic) Petr Blümel
(United States) Dan Schachte

N. Lidström (K. Johnsson, M. Nylander) – 3:10	1–0
	1–1	7:47 – O. Romanov (I. Matushkin, A. Kalyuzhny) (SH)
	1–2	9:33 – D. Dudik (A. Kovalev, A. Rasolko) (PP2)
M. Nylander (M. Sundin, N. Lidström) (PP) – 30:14	2–2
	2–3	42:47 – A. Kovalev
M. Sundin – 47:54	3–3
	3–4	57:36 – V. Kopat (O. Antonenko, V. Bekbulatov)

8 min
Penalties
14 min
47
Shots
19

20 February 2002; 13:30	Czech Republic	0–1 (0–0, 0–1, 0–0)	Russia	Peaks Ice Arena, Provo; Attendance: 5,219

Game reference
Dominik Hašek	Goalies	Nikolai Khabibulin	Referee: (Canada) Stephen Walkom; Linesmen: (Sweden) Johan Norrman (United States) Tim Nowak
0–1 / 24:48 − M. Afinogenov (A. Nikolishin, V. Malakhov)			Referee: (Canada) Stephen Walkom; Linesmen: (Sweden) Johan Norrman (United States) Tim Nowak
6 min	Penalties	22 min	Referee: (Canada) Stephen Walkom; Linesmen: (Sweden) Johan Norrman (United States) Tim Nowak
41	Shots	27	Referee: (Canada) Stephen Walkom; Linesmen: (Sweden) Johan Norrman (United States) Tim Nowak

20 February 2002; 16:00	United States	5–0 (1–0, 4–0, 0–0)	Germany	E Center, West Valley City; Attendance: 8,599

Game reference

Mike Richter
Goalies
Marc Seliger
Robert Müller
Referee:
(Sweden) Ulf Rådbjer
Linesmen:
(Canada) Jean Morin
(Canada) Derek Nansen

J. Roenick (B. Rafalski, D. Weight) (PP2) – 13:06	1–0
C. Chelios – 20:46	2–0
T. Amonte (J. Roenick) – 29:42	3–0
J. LeClair (P. Housley, M. Modano) – 30:14	4–0
B. Hull (M. Modano, J. LeClair) – 31:47	5–0

4 min
Penalties
33 min
33
Shots
28

20 February 2002; 20:15	Finland	1–2 (0–1, 1–1, 0–0)	Canada	E Center, West Valley City; Attendance: 8,599

Game reference

Jani Hurme
Goalies
Martin Brodeur
Referee:
(United States) Dennis LaRue
Linesmen:
(Canada) Mike Cvik
(Slovakia) Rudolf Lauff

	0–1	3:00 – J. Sakic (S. Gagné)
	0–2	35:49 – S. Yzerman (M. Lemieux)
N. Hagman (T. Kallio, O. Jokinen) – 36:09	1–2

2 min
Penalties
2 min
19
Shots
34

=== Semifinals ===
22 February 2002; 12:00	Canada	7–1 (2–1, 2–0, 3–0)	Belarus	E Center, West Valley City; Attendance: 8,599

Game reference

Martin Brodeur
Goalies
Andrei Mezin
Sergei Shabanov
Referee:
(Canada) Stephen Walkom
Linesmen:
(Russia) Sergei Kulakov
(United States) Tim Nowak

S. Yzerman (J. Sakic, R. Blake) – 6:05	1–0
	1–1	13:24 – R. Salei
E. Brewer (S. Yzerman) – 17:25	2–1
S. Niedermayer (M. Lemieux, P. Kariya) (PP) – 22:09	3–1
P. Kariya (S. Yzerman, M. Lemieux) – 33:28	4–1
S. Gagné (M. Peca) (SH) – 45:21	5–1
E. Lindros (R. Smyth, O. Nolan) (PP) – 52:24	6–1
J. Iginla (B. Shanahan) – 56:15	7–1

16 min
Penalties
14 min
51
Shots
14

22 February 2002; 16:20	Russia	2–3 (0–1, 0–2, 2–0)	United States	E Center, West Valley City; Attendance: 8,599

Game reference

Nikolai Khabibulin
Goalies
Mike Richter
Referee:
(Canada) Bill McCreary
Linesmen:
(Finland) Antti Hämäläinen
(Canada) Jean Morin

	0–1	15:56 – B. Guerin (PP)
	0–2	27:31 – S. Young (P. Housley, B. Leetch) (PP)
	0–3	37:39 – P. Housley (T. Amonte) (PP)
A. Kovalev (D. Markov, O. Tverdovsky) – 40:11	1–3
V. Malakhov – 43:21	2–3

12 min
Penalties
8 min
30
Shots
49

=== Bronze medal game ===
23 February 2002; 12:15	Belarus	2–7 (1–2, 1–2, 0–3)	Russia	E Center, West Valley City; Attendance: 8,599

Game reference

Andrei Mezin
Sergei Shabanov
Goalies
Nikolai Khabibulin
Referee:
(Sweden) Ulf Rådbjer
Linesmen:
(Sweden) Johan Norrman
(United States) Dan Schachte

	0–1	5:28 – A. Kovalev (I. Larionov)
D. Pankov (V. Tsyplakov) – 9:21	1–1
	1–2	11:20 – D. Kasparaitis (I. Larionov, A. Kovalev)
D. Dudik (V. Kopat) – 21:15	2–2
	2–3	23:11 – O. Tverdovsky (S. Fedorov, A. Yashin) (PP)
	2–4	23:34 – P. Datsyuk (I. Kravchuk)
	2–5	47:47 – A. Kovalev (P. Datsyuk, I. Larionov)
	2–6	52:30 – P. Bure (P. Datsyuk)
	2–7	59:11 – M. Afinogenov (S. Samsonov, V. Malakhov)

12 min
Penalties
8 min
23
Shots
45

=== Gold medal game ===
24 February 2002; 13:00	United States	2–5 (1–2, 1–1, 0–2)	Canada	E Center, West Valley City; Attendance: 8,599

Game reference

Mike Richter
Goalies
Martin Brodeur
Referee:
(Canada) Bill McCreary
Linesmen:
(Canada) Mike Cvik
(Finland) Antti Hämäläinen

T. Amonte (D. Weight, T. Poti) – 8:49	1–0
	1–1	14:50 – P. Kariya (C. Pronger, M. Lemieux)
	1–2	18:33 – J. Iginla (J. Sakic, S. Gagné)
B. Rafalski (M. Modano, B. Hull) (PP) – 35:30	2–2
	2–3	38:19 – J. Sakic (E. Jovanovski, R. Blake) (PP)
	2–4	56:01 – J. Iginla (S. Yzerman, J. Sakic)
	2–5	58:40 – J. Sakic (J. Iginla)

6 min
Penalties
8 min
33
Shots
39

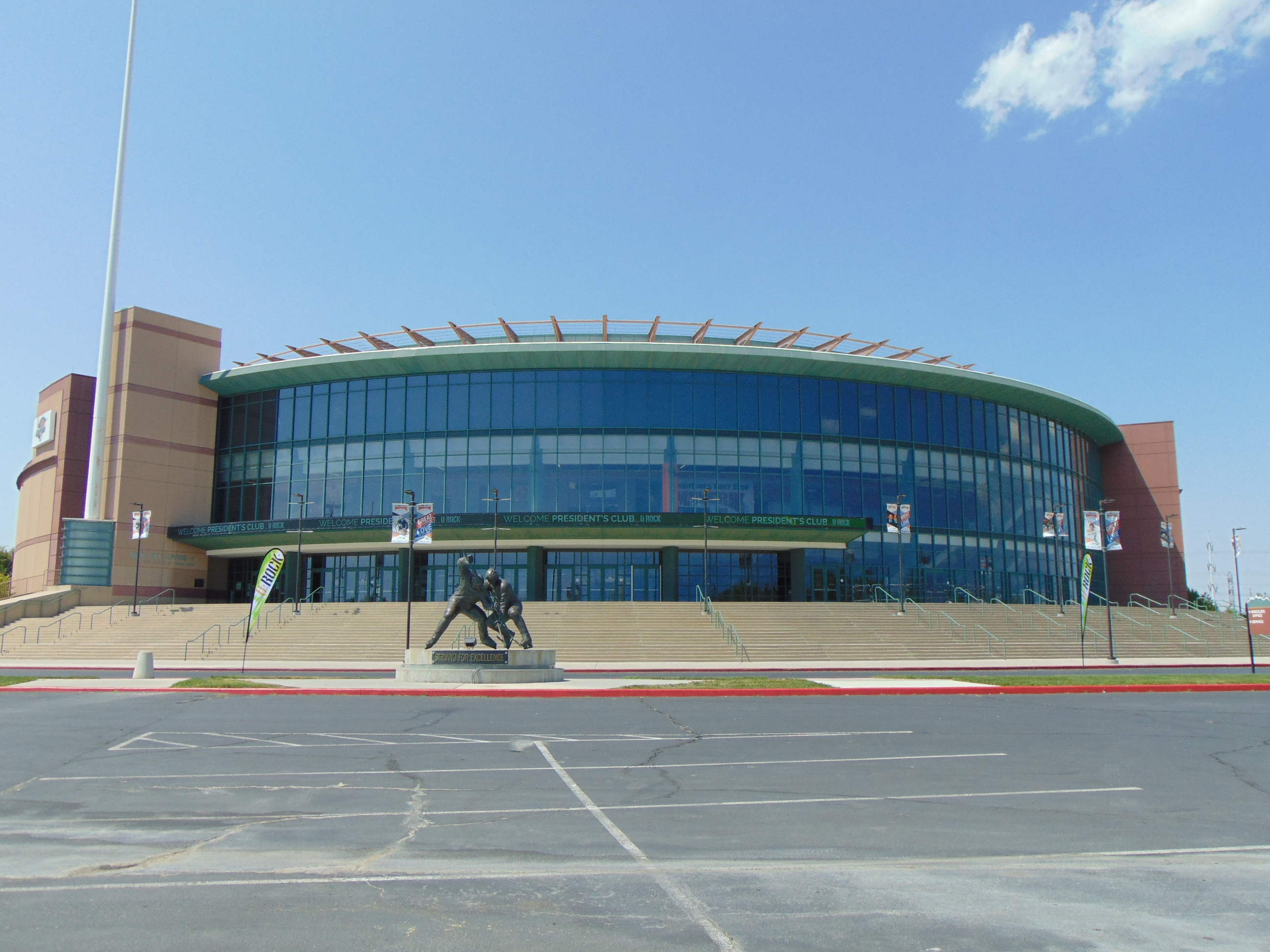
E Center (pictured in 2017) was the main venue for the men's tournament and also hosted the final.

== Final rankings ==
1st place, gold medalist(s)	Canada
2nd place, silver medalist(s)	United States
3rd place, bronze medalist(s)	Russia
4th	Belarus
5th	Sweden
6th	Finland
7th	Czech Republic
8th	Germany
9th	Latvia
10th	Ukraine
11th	Switzerland
12th	Austria
13th	Slovakia
14th	France

Source: IIHF

== Statistics ==
=== Scoring leaders ===
The list shows the top ten skaters sorted by points, then goals.

Player	GP	G	A	Pts	+/–	PIM	POS
(Sweden) Mats Sundin	4	5	4	9	+4	10	F
(United States) Brett Hull	6	3	5	8	+4	6	F
(United States) John LeClair	6	6	1	7	+2	2	F
(Canada) Joe Sakic	6	4	3	7	+6	0	F
(Slovakia) Marian Hossa	2	4	2	6	+5	0	F
(Switzerland) Jean-Jacques Aeschlimann	4	3	3	6	0	2	F
(France) Philippe Bozon	4	3	3	6	+1	2	F
(Germany) Len Soccio	7	3	3	6	+3	8	F
(Canada) Mario Lemieux	4	2	4	6	+4	0	F
(Canada) Steve Yzerman	6	2	4	6	+4	2	F

Source: IIHF

=== Leading goaltenders ===
The list shows the top five goaltenders, based on save percentage, who have played at least 40% of their team's minutes.

Player	TOI	GA	GAA	SA	SV%	SO
(Switzerland) Martin Gerber	157:44	4	1.52	95	95.79	0
(United States) Mike Richter	240:00	9	2.25	132	93.18	1
(Russia) Nikolai Khabibulin	359:12	14	2.34	200	93.00	1
(Sweden) Tommy Salo	179:03	7	2.35	92	92.39	0
(Czech Republic) Dominik Hašek	239:00	8	2.01	105	92.38	0

Source: IIHF

== Awards ==
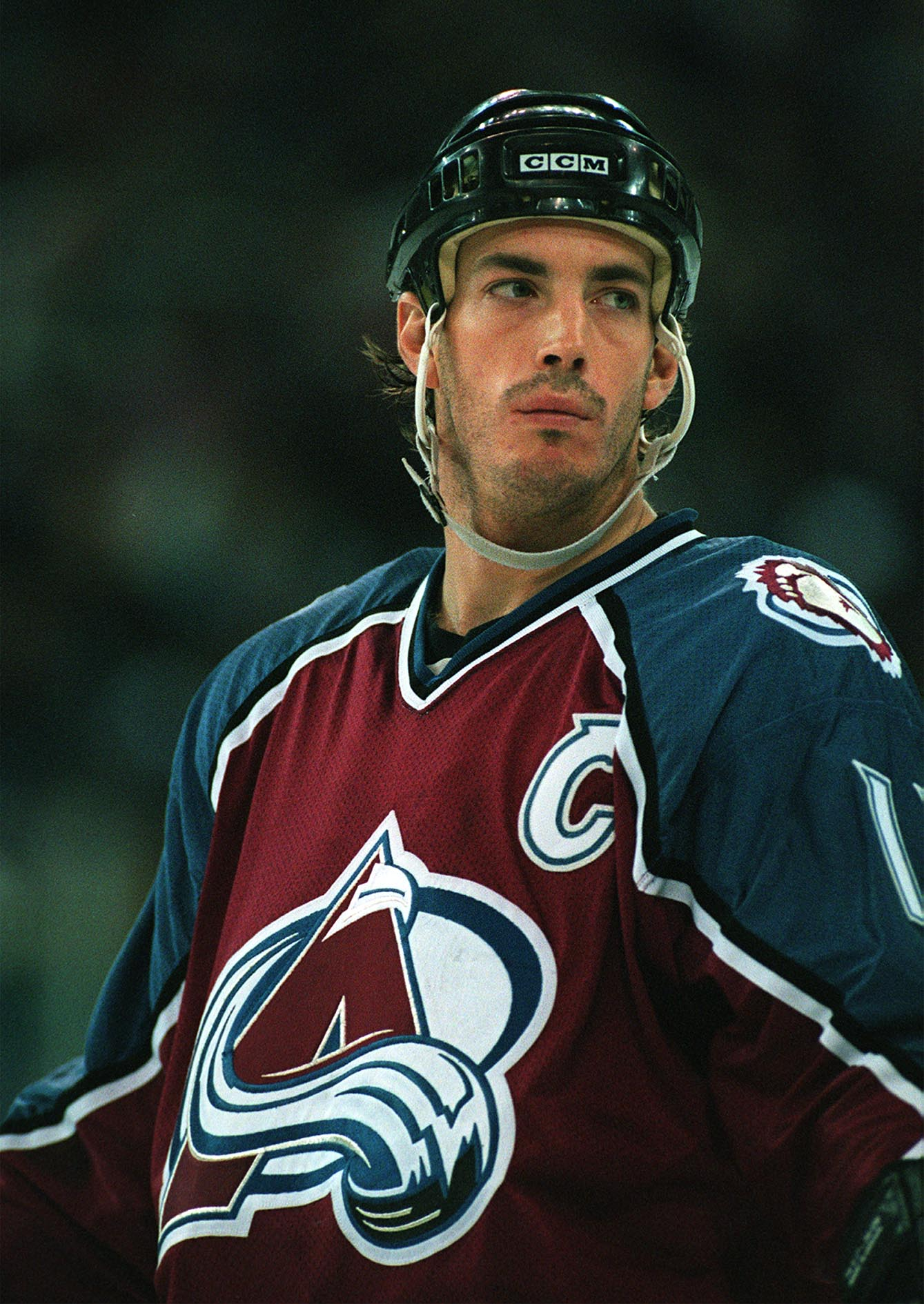
Joe Sakic (pictured in 1997) was named MVP of the tournament.

Media all-star team

Position	Player
Goaltender	(United States) Mike Richter
Defenceman	(United States) Brian Leetch (United States) Chris Chelios
Forward	(United States) John LeClair (Canada) Joe Sakic (Sweden) Mats Sundin
MVP	(Canada) Joe Sakic

Best players selected by the directorate

Position	Player
Goaltender	(Russia) Nikolai Khabibulin
Defenceman	(United States) Chris Chelios
Forward	(Canada) Joe Sakic
