= Crameri =

Crameri is a surname. Notable people with the surname include:

- Ben Crameri (born 1936), Australian rules footballer
- Gian-Marco Crameri (born 1972), Swiss professional ice hockey coach
- Stewart Crameri (born 1988), Australian rules footballer
