= Andrey Kovalyov =

Belarusian ice hockey player

- Born: April 2, 1966 (age 60) Vitebsk, Byelorussian SSR, Soviet Union
- Height: 6 ft 0 in (183 cm)
- Weight: 185 lb (84 kg; 13 st 3 lb)
- Position: Right wing
- Shot: Right
- Played for: HC Dinamo Minsk; HC Dynamo Moscow; SC Bietigheim-Bissingen; Schwenninger ERC; HC Davos; Krefeld Pinguine; Revierlöwen Oberhausen; Heilbronner Falken; Yunost Minsk
- National team: Belarus
- NHL draft: 114th overall, 1990; Washington Capitals
- Playing career: 1983–2008

Andrey Robertovich Kovalyov (Russian: Андрей Робертович Ковалёв; born 2 April 1966) is a Belarusian ice hockey player. He competed in the men's tournaments at the 1998 Winter Olympics and the 2002 Winter Olympics.

Kovalyov was selected by the Washington Capitals in the 1983 NHL entry draft, and spent several years in the minor leagues of North America.

== Career statistics ==
=== Regular season and playoffs ===
			Regular season					Playoffs
Season	Team	League	GP	G	A	Pts	PIM	GP	G	A	Pts	PIM
1983–84	Dinamo Minsk	USSR-2	10	1	—	—	—	—	—	—	—	—
1984–85	Dinamo Minsk	USSR-2	31	8	5	13	14	—	—	—	—	—
1985–86	Dinamo Minsk	USSR-2	53	35	15	50	61	—	—	—	—	—
1986–87	Dinamo Minsk	USSR-2	53	33	26	59	68	—	—	—	—	—
1987–88	Dinamo Minsk	USSR-2	71	27	21	48	53	—	—	—	—	—
1988–89	Dinamo Minsk	USSR	26	17	4	21	6	—	—	—	—	—
1989–90	Dynamo Moscow	USSR	41	10	8	18	8	—	—	—	—	—
1990–91	Dynamo Moscow	USSR	43	17	8	25	18	—	—	—	—	—
1991–92	Dinamo Minsk	CIS	20	6	5	11	13	—	—	—	—	—
1991–92	New Haven Nighthawks	AHL	33	11	12	23	31	1	0	1	1	2
1992–93	Muskegon Fury	CoHL	7	3	3	6	0	—	—	—	—	—
1992–93	Roanoke Valley Rampage	ECHL	24	11	9	20	37	—	—	—	—	—
1992–93	Greensboro Monarchs	ECHL	7	2	2	4	17	—	—	—	—	—
1993–94	SC Bietigheim–Bissingen	GER-4	17	23	20	43	72	—	—	—	—	—
1993–94	Schwenninger ERC	GER	19	15	9	24	23	11	8	6	14	8
1994–95	SERC Wild Wings	DEL	40	39	18	57	88	10	3	9	12	36
1995–96	HC Davos	NLA	10	3	1	4	0	—	—	—	—	—
1995–96	Krefeld Pinguine	DEL	32	24	12	36	43	6	3	4	7	4
1996–97	Krefeld Pinguine	DEL	39	25	33	58	28	3	2	0	2	4
1997–98	Krefeld Pinguine	DEL	38	22	10	32	43	10	2	3	5	12
1998–99	Krefeld Pinguine	DEL	51	17	32	49	30	4	3	1	4	6
1999–2000	Krefeld Pinguine	DEL	49	14	23	37	30	4	1	0	1	10
2000–01	Revierlöwen Oberhausen	DEL	58	19	15	34	20	3	0	0	0	4
2001–02	Revierlöwen Oberhausen	DEL	57	21	27	48	81	—	—	—	—	—
2002–03	SC Bietigheim–Bissingen	GER-2	54	34	38	72	104	7	3	7	10	10
2003–04	Bietigheim Steelers	GER-2	49	26	57	83	42	8	3	4	7	10
2004–05	Bietigheim Steelers	GER-2	46	23	22	45	48	3	2	2	4	16
2005–06	Heilbronner Falken	GER-3	49	31	36	67	92	4	1	2	3	0
2006–07	Yunost Minsk	BLR	45	14	23	37	74	8	2	2	4	2
2007–08	Yunost Minsk	BLR	7	1	0	1	0	—	—	—	—	—
Soviet/CIS totals			130	50	25	75	45	—	—	—	—	—
DEL totals			364	181	170	351	363	40	14	17	31	76

=== International ===
Year	Team	Event	GP	G	A	Pts	PIM
1986	Soviet Union	WJC	7	1	1	2	0
1995	Belarus	WC C	4	4	0	4	0
1996	Belarus	WC B	7	5	2	7	0
1997	Belarus	WC B	7	4	5	9	16
1998	Belarus	OLY	7	1	3	4	2
1998	Belarus	WC	5	0	0	0	2
1999	Belarus	WC	6	2	2	4	2
2000	Belarus	WC	6	2	2	4	6
2001	Belarus	OGQ	3	0	0	0	0
2001	Belarus	WC	6	0	2	2	2
2002	Belarus	OLY	9	1	2	3	12
2003	Belarus	WC	6	0	1	1	0
Junior totals			7	1	1	2	0
Senior totals			66	19	19	38	42
