= Andreas Morczinietz =

German ice hockey player

- Born: March 11, 1978 (age 47) Wolfratshausen, West Germany
- Height: 6 ft 1 in (185 cm)
- Weight: 190 lb (86 kg; 13 st 8 lb)
- Position: Right wing
- Shoots: Left
- DEL team: Hannover Scorpions
- National team: Germany
- NHL draft: Undrafted
- Playing career: 2001–present

Andreas Morczinietz (born March 11, 1978) is a German professional ice hockey player. He is currently playing for Hannover Scorpions in the Deutsche Eishockey Liga (DEL).

== Career statistics ==
=== Regular season and playoffs ===
			Regular season					Playoffs
Season	Team	League	GP	G	A	Pts	PIM	GP	G	A	Pts	PIM
1994–95	TuS Geretsried	DEU U20	8	9	13	22	14	—	—	—	—	—
1995–96	TuS Geretsried	DEU.2	35	12	11	23	8	—	—	—	—	—
1996–97	TuS Geretsried	DEU.2	32	16	16	32	10	4	1	1	2	6
1997–98	EC Bad Nauheim	DEU.2	62	9	14	23	12	—	—	—	—	—
1998–99	GEC Nordhorn	DEU.2	62	27	32	59	36	—	—	—	—	—
1999–2000	GEC Nordhorn	DEU.2	18	6	9	15	6	—	—	—	—	—
1999–2000	EC Bad Nauheim	DEU.2	41	14	21	35	35	—	—	—	—	—
2000–01	EC Bad Nauheim	DEU.2	44	20	26	46	16	—	—	—	—	—
2001–02	Augsburger Panther	DEL	60	25	25	50	22	4	3	0	3	2
2002–03	Kölner Haie	DEL	52	10	15	25	18	15	1	3	4	6
2003–04	Kölner Haie	DEL	52	10	14	24	48	6	1	1	2	0
2004–05	Hannover Scorpions	DEL	52	26	15	41	26	—	—	—	—	—
2005–06	Hannover Scorpions	DEL	47	14	20	34	16	10	2	4	6	6
2006–07	Hannover Scorpions	DEL	52	11	7	18	30	6	1	0	1	6
2007–08	Hannover Scorpions	DEL	33	6	6	12	16	—	—	—	—	—
2007–08	Grizzly Adams Wolfsburg	DEL	21	11	7	18	30	—	—	—	—	—
2008–09	Grizzly Adams Wolfsburg	DEL	48	6	13	19	28	6	1	1	2	2
2009–10	Grizzly Adams Wolfsburg	DEL	49	12	12	24	14	7	0	1	1	8
2010–11	Grizzly Adams Wolfsburg	DEL	51	5	12	17	28	7	1	1	2	2
2011–12	Hannover Scorpions	DEL	52	7	18	25	28	—	—	—	—	—
2012–13	Hannover Scorpions	DEL	44	8	13	21	24	—	—	—	—	—
2013–14	Hannover Scorpions	DEU.3	32	41	55	96	8	10	8	12	20	18
2014–15	Hannover Scorpions	DEU.3	28	27	45	72	12	10	7	12	19	2
2015–16	Hannover Scorpions	DEU.3	33	24	43	67	16	3	0	0	0	22
2016–17	ESC Wedemark Scorpions	DEU.3	40	15	45	60	61	2	0	1	1	0
2017–18	Hannover Indians	DEU.3	38	14	22	36	44	4	1	1	2	0
2018–19	Hannover Indians	DEU.3	43	25	34	59	26	4	0	1	1	2
DEU.2 totals			294	104	129	233	123	4	1	1	2	6
DEL totals			613	147	181	328	316	61	10	11	21	32
DEU.3 totals			214	146	244	390	167	33	16	27	43	44

=== International ===
Year	Team	Event	GP	G	A	Pts	PIM
1995	Germany	EJC	5	0	1	1	0
1996	Germany	WJC	6	3	4	7	0
1996	Germany	EJC	5	5	4	9	4
1998	Germany	WJC	6	0	0	0	2
2002	Germany	OG	3	0	2	2	0
2002	Germany	WC	7	2	2	4	8
2003	Germany	WC	7	3	1	4	6
2004	Germany	WC	6	1	1	2	0
2005	Germany	WC	3	0	0	0	0
Junior totals			22	8	9	17	6
Senior totals			26	6	6	12	14
