= Marc Seliger =

German ice hockey player (born 1974)

Personal information
- Nationality: German
- Born: 1 May 1974 (age 50); Iserlohn, Germany

Sport
- Sport: Ice hockey

Marc Seliger (born 1 May 1974) is a German ice hockey player. He competed in the men's tournament at the 2002 Winter Olympics.
