= Patrick Rolland =

French ice hockey player

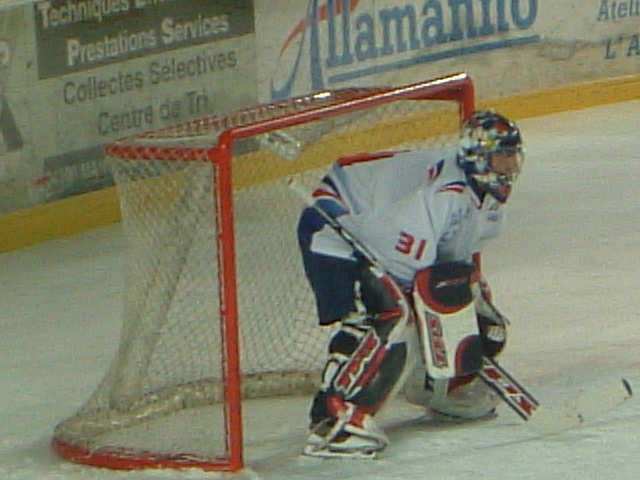
- Patrick Rolland in 2003

Personal information
- Nationality: French
- Born: 7 June 1969 (age 56) Montreal, Quebec, Canada

Sport
- Sport: Ice hockey

Patrick Rolland (born 7 June 1969) is a Canadian-born French former ice hockey goaltender.

Rolland was born in Montreal, Quebec, Canada. He played his entire career in France, playing for Viry-Châtillon EH, Hockey Club de Reims, Brûleurs de Loups and Brest Albatros Hockey. He also competed in the men's tournament at the 2002 Winter Olympics.
