= Dmitry Pankov =

Belarusian ice hockey player

Personal information
- Nationality: Belarusian
- Born: 29 October 1974 (age 50); Minsk, Belarus

Sport
- Sport: Ice hockey

Dmitry Pankov (born 29 October 1974) is a Belarusian ice hockey player. He competed in the men's tournament at the 2002 Winter Olympics.

== Career statistics ==
=== Regular season and playoffs ===
			Regular season					Playoffs
Season	Team	League	GP	G	A	Pts	PIM	GP	G	A	Pts	PIM
1991–92	Khimik Novopolotsk	CIS.3	10	1	2	3	2	—	—	—	—	—
1992–93	Dinamo Minsk	IHL	27	2	1	3	6	—	—	—	—	—
1992–93	Tivali Minsk	BLR	11	2	6	8	0	—	—	—	—	—
1993–94	Tivali Minsk	BLR	16	5	4	9	0	—	—	—	—	—
1993–94	Tivali Minsk	IHL	37	5	4	9	16	—	—	—	—	—
1994–95	Tivali Minsk	IHL	2	0	0	0	0	—	—	—	—	—
1994–95	Le National de Joliette	QPJHL	31	33	35	68	20	—	—	—	—	—
1995–96	Springfield Falcons	AHL	11	0	1	1	2	—	—	—	—	—
1995–96	Richmond Renegades	ECHL	49	33	22	55	26	7	6	2	8	0
1996–97	Severstal Cherepovets	RSL	42	14	5	19	18	—	—	—	—	—
1997–98	Torpedo Yaroslavl	RSL	45	8	9	17	70	6	1	0	1	2
1998–99	Torpedo Yaroslavl	RSL	41	5	11	16	2	14	7	4	11	0
1999–2000	Torpedo Yaroslavl	RSL	37	4	5	9	6	10	1	4	5	0
1999–2000	Torpedo–2 Yaroslavl	RUS.3	1	0	0	0	0	—	—	—	—	—
2000–01	Torpedo Nizhny Novgorod	RSL	40	10	8	18	2	—	—	—	—	—
2001–02	Metallurg Novokuznetsk	RSL	38	8	12	20	26	—	—	—	—	—
2002–03	Metallurg Novokuznetsk	RSL	40	5	11	16	4	—	—	—	—	—
2003–04	Metallurg Novokuznetsk	RSL	57	10	7	17	66	4	4	0	4	0
2004–05	Salavat Yulaev Ufa	RSL	17	3	1	4	6	—	—	—	—	—
2004–05	Keramin Minsk	BLR	18	2	6	8	2	10	1	1	2	0
2005–06	Keramin Minsk	BLR	53	12	21	33	22	4	0	0	0	0
2006–07	Keramin Minsk	BLR	16	2	5	7	0	—	—	—	—	—
2006–07	Keramin–2 Minsk	BLR.2	2	0	2	2	0	—	—	—	—	—
IHL totals			66	7	5	12	22	—	—	—	—	—
RSL totals			357	67	69	136	200	35	13	8	21	2

=== International ===
Year	Team	Event	GP	G	A	Pts	PIM
1992	Belarus	WC C Q	2	1	0	1	2
1994	Belarus	WC C	6	3	0	3	0
1997	Belarus	OGQ	7	2	2	4	4
1997	Belarus	WC B	7	0	1	1	4
1998	Belarus	WC	6	3	1	4	0
1999	Belarus	WC	6	1	1	2	2
2000	Belarus	WC	6	0	1	1	2
2001	Belarus	OGQ	3	0	0	0	0
2001	Belarus	WC	6	3	1	4	2
2002	Belarus	OG	9	3	1	4	2
2002	Belarus	WC D1	5	4	6	10	0
2003	Belarus	WC	6	1	3	4	2
Senior totals			69	21	17	38	20

"Dmitri Pankov". Elite Prospects.
