= Andreas Loth =

German ice hockey player

- Born: 26 February 1972 (age 54) Schongau, West Germany
- Height: 6 ft 0 in (183 cm)
- Weight: 190 lb (86 kg; 13 st 8 lb)
- Position: Forward
- Shot: Left
- Played for: EA Schongau; EV Landshut; EC Graz; Wiener EV; VEU Feldkirch; Kassel Huskies; ERC Ingolstadt; Kölner Haie; EV Ravensburg
- NHL draft: Undrafted
- Playing career: 1989–2007

Andreas Loth (born 26 February 1972) is a German ice hockey player. He competed in the men's tournament at the 2002 Winter Olympics.

== Career statistics ==
=== Regular season and playoffs ===
			Regular season					Playoffs
Season	Team	League	GP	G	A	Pts	PIM	GP	G	A	Pts	PIM
1989–90	EA Schongau	DEU.4	19	6	10	16	6	—	—	—	—	—
1990–91	EA Schongau	DEU.4	14	8	8	16	10	—	—	—	—	—
1991–92	EV Landshut	1.GBun	2	0	0	0	2	—	—	—	—	—
1992–93	EV Landshut	1.GBun	30	0	1	1	4	—	—	—	—	—
1993–94	EV Landshut	1.GBun	44	5	9	14	32	7	0	1	1	4
1994–95	EV Landshut	DEL	37	4	4	8	18	18	0	1	1	16
1995–96	EV Landshut	DEL	43	3	7	10	36	11	0	1	1	14
1996–97	EC Graz	AUT	40	15	11	26	72	—	—	—	—	—
1997–98	EC Graz	AUT	18	5	8	13	43	—	—	—	—	—
1997–98	Wiener EV	AUT	23	7	4	11	24	—	—	—	—	—
1998–99	VEU Feldkirch	AUT	47	10	10	20	34	—	—	—	—	—
1999–2000	Kassel Huskies	DEL	48	5	6	11	38	8	1	5	6	4
2000–01	Kassel Huskies	DEL	56	12	16	28	32	8	1	2	3	8
2001–02	Kassel Huskies	DEL	60	11	10	21	34	2	0	1	1	10
2002–03	Kassel Huskies	DEL	52	1	6	7	26	6	1	1	2	25
2003–04	Kassel Huskies	DEL	49	5	11	16	59	—	—	—	—	—
2004–05	ERC Ingolstadt	DEL	23	1	5	6	10	—	—	—	—	—
2004–05	Kölner Haie	DEL	28	1	0	1	26	7	1	0	1	0
2005–06	EV Ravensburg	DEU.3	26	9	11	20	45	5	2	1	3	2
2006–07	EV Ravensburg	DEU.3	49	11	10	21	52	11	1	0	1	14
AUT totals			128	37	33	70	173	—	—	—	—	—
DEL totals			396	43	65	108	279	60	4	11	15	77

=== International ===
Year	Team	Event	GP	G	A	Pts	PIM
1992	Germany	WJC	7	0	1	1	2
2000	Germany	WC B	7	1	4	5	2
2001	Germany	OGQ	3	1	0	1	2
2001	Germany	WC	7	1	0	1	10
2002	Germany	OG	7	2	0	2	0
2002	Germany	WC	7	1	2	3	2
Junior totals			7	0	1	1	2
Senior totals			31	6	6	12	16
