= Klaus Kathan =

German ice hockey player

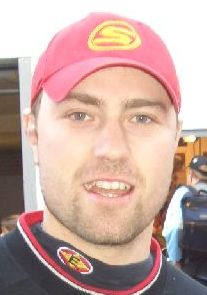
- Born: January 7, 1977 (age 49) Bad Tölz, West Germany
- Height: 6 ft 0 in (183 cm)
- Weight: 187 lb (85 kg; 13 st 5 lb)
- Position: Right wing
- Shot: Right
- Played for: Berlin Capitals; Star Bulls Rosenheim; Kassel Huskies; Adler Mannheim; DEG Metro Stars; Hannover Scorpions; EHC München
- National team: Germany
- NHL draft: Undrafted
- Playing career: 1994–2018

Klaus Kathan (born January 7, 1977) is a German former professional ice hockey winger. He played in the Deutsche Eishockey Liga (DEL) for the Berlin Capitals, Star Bulls Rosenheim, Kassel Huskies, Adler Mannheim, DEG Metro Stars, Hannover Scorpions, and the EHC München during the 2012-13 season.

== Playing career ==
Kathan began his career in 1994 for his hometown EC Bad Tölz of the 2nd Bundesliga. In his three seasons with the team, he played in 92 regular season games and scored 72 points including 43 goals, 24 of them coming in the 1995-96 season.

During the 1996-97 season, Kathan made his DEL debut for the Berlin Capitals, scoring seven goals in 23 games and also scored twice in the playoffs during the Capitals' series against local rivals the Eisbären Berlin, which they lost three games to one. In 1998, Kathan moved to the Star Bulls Rosenheim where he remained for two seasons, scoring a total of 34 goals. The Star Bulls however missed out on the playoffs in both seasons and despite surviving relegation in 2000, they withdrew from the DEL due to financial issues.

After Rosenheim's departure, Kathan moved to the Kassel Huskies, scoring 25 goals in his two seasons with the team and reaching the playoffs in both seasons, scoring three goals in each campaign. In 2002, he joined the Adler Mannheim, but his tenure with the team was hampered with injury and illness. In the first season for the team, he broke his wrist and in his second season, he suffered with meningitis. The setbacks contributed to a sharp decline in his performance, scoring just four goals in his two seasons with Mannheim.

In 2004, Kathan joined the DEG Metro Stars where he bounced back into goal-scoring form. In the 2005-06 season, Kathan led the Metro Stars in goals with 28. The team also reached the playoff finals, losing to the Eisbären Berlin in three games. At the end of the 2007-08 season, Kathan's contract was not renewed at DEG, so he signed a contract with the Hannover Scorpions, winning a DEL championship with the team in 2010.

In 2011, Kathan moved to EHC München. On 14th of October 2012, Kathan became the fourth player, and first Bayer, to reach 900 DEL games. In 2013, Kathan returned to Bad Tölz, now known as Tölzer Löwen and playing in the Oberliga. The team was promoted to DEL2 for the 2017-2018 season, which would be Kathan's final season before retiring.

== International career ==
Kathan played for the German national team in five Ice Hockey World Championships as well as the 2002 Winter Olympics. Kathan was the top scorer in the Olympic qualifiers in 2002.

== Career statistics ==
=== Regular season and playoffs ===
			Regular season					Playoffs
Season	Team	League	GP	G	A	Pts	PIM	GP	G	A	Pts	PIM
1994–95	EC Bad Tölz	DEU U20	28	26	14	40	63	—	—	—	—	—
1995–96	EC Bad Tölz	DEU.2	29	6	3	9	6	1	0	0	0	0
1995–96	EC Bad Tölz	DEU.2	40	24	16	40	62	—	—	—	—	—
1996–97	EC Bad Tölz	DEU.2	23	13	10	23	69	—	—	—	—	—
1996–97	Berlin Capitals	DEL	23	7	1	8	18	4	2	0	2	6
1997–98	Berlin Capitals	DEL	43	7	5	12	37	3	0	0	0	0
1998–99	Star Bulls Rosenheim	DEL	52	16	19	35	61	—	—	—	—	—
1999–2000	Star Bulls Rosenheim	DEL	53	18	10	28	46	—	—	—	—	—
2000–01	Kassel Huskies	DEL	56	14	22	36	32	8	3	3	6	8
2001–02	Kassel Huskies	DEL	59	11	17	18	83	7	3	4	7	4
2002–03	Adler Mannheim	DEL	37	3	14	17	28	8	0	0	0	8
2003–04	Adler Mannheim	DEL	43	1	10	11	32	6	0	0	0	6
2004–05	DEG Metro Stars	DEL	52	20	8	28	40	—	—	—	—	—
2005–06	DEG Metro Stars	DEL	52	28	20	48	86	13	4	9	13	35
2006–07	DEG Metro Stars	DEL	52	15	21	36	22	9	3	2	5	12
2007–08	DEG Metro Stars	DEL	54	15	10	25	52	13	2	7	9	12
2008–09	Hannover Scorpions	DEL	52	7	24	31	26	7	0	0	0	25
2009–10	Hannover Scorpions	DEL	56	11	23	34	42	11	3	3	6	2
2010–11	Hannover Scorpions	DEL	52	12	21	33	28	5	0	2	2	4
2011–12	EHC München	DEL	50	9	14	23	34	—	—	—	—	—
2012–13	EHC München	DEL	45	8	9	17	18	—	—	—	—	—
2013–14	Tölzer Löwen	DEU.3	44	19	22	41	30	10	0	11	11	30
2014–15	Tölzer Löwen	DEU.3	42	17	25	42	55	3	1	1	2	2
2015–16	Tölzer Löwen	DEU.3	35	12	21	33	44	4	1	1	2	4
2016–17	Tölzer Löwen	DEU.3	35	8	31	39	30	14	5	4	9	26
2017–18	Tölzer Löwen	DEU.2	51	14	18	32	32	—	—	—	—	—
DEL totals			831	202	248	450	685	94	20	30	50	122
DEU.3 totals			156	56	99	155	159	31	7	17	24	62

=== International ===
Year	Team	Event	GP	G	A	Pts	PIM
1994	Germany	EJC	5	0	0	0	0
1995	Germany	EJC	5	2	2	4	2
1996	Germany	WJC	6	1	0	1	8
1997	Germany	WJC	6	1	1	2	8
1999	Germany	WC B	7	1	0	1	6
2000	Germany	OGQ	3	1	1	2	2
2000	Germany	WC B	7	4	3	7	6
2001	Germany	OGQ	3	4	3	7	6
2001	Germany	WC	7	1	2	3	0
2002	Germany	OG	7	3	2	5	0
2002	Germany	WC	7	2	2	4	4
2003	Germany	WC	7	0	2	2	4
2004	Germany	WC	6	1	0	1	2
2004	Germany	WCH	3	0	0	0	2
2005	Germany	WC	3	1	1	2	0
2006	Germany	OG	5	0	0	0	2
Junior totals			22	4	3	7	18
Senior totals			65	18	16	34	34
