= Aleksandr Zhurik =

Belarusian ice hockey player

- Born: May 29, 1975 (age 50) Minsk, Belarus
- Height: 6 ft 4 in (193 cm)
- Weight: 220 lb (100 kg; 15 st 10 lb)
- Position: Defense
- Shot: Left
- Played for: Khimik Novopolotsk; Cape Breton Oilers; Hamilton Bulldogs; HC Dynamo Moscow; Avangard Omsk; Krylya Sovetov Moscow; HC Spartak Moscow; CSKA Moscow; HK MVD Balashika; Yunost Minsk; HC Dinamo Minsk
- National team: Belarus
- NHL draft: 163rd overall, 1993; Edmonton Oilers
- Playing career: 1992–2009

Aleksandr Zhurik (born 29 May 1975) is a Belarusian ice hockey player. He competed in the men's tournaments at the 1998 Winter Olympics and the 2002 Winter Olympics.

== Career statistics ==
=== Regular season and playoffs ===
			Regular season					Playoffs
Season	Team	League	GP	G	A	Pts	PIM	GP	G	A	Pts	PIM
1992–93	Khimik Novopolotsk	RUS.2	1	0	0	0	0	—	—	—	—	—
1993–94	Kingston Frontenacs	OHL	59	7	23	30	92	—	—	—	—	—
1994–95	Kingston Frontenacs	OHL	54	3	21	24	51	—	—	—	—	—
1995–96	Cape Breton Oilers	AHL	80	5	36	41	85	—	—	—	—	—
1996–97	Hamilton Bulldogs	AHL	72	5	16	21	49	22	2	11	13	14
1997–98	Hamilton Bulldogs	AHL	63	1	23	24	84	9	0	4	4	8
1998–99	Dynamo Moscow	RSL	42	1	7	8	82	15	0	0	0	12
1999–2000	Hamilton Bulldogs	AHL	54	2	16	18	54	10	0	3	3	10
2000–01	Avangard Omsk	RSL	38	4	5	9	55	16	2	3	5	20
2001–02	Krylya Sovetov Moscow	RSL	41	2	7	9	34	3	0	0	0	31
2002–03	Spartak Moscow	RSL	19	1	2	3	18	—	—	—	—	—
2002–03	CSKA Moscow	RSL	26	2	1	3	51	—	—	—	—	—
2002–03	CSKA–2 Moscow	RUS.3	1	1	0	1	2	—	—	—	—	—
2003–04	CSKA Moscow	RSL	24	0	2	2	47	—	—	—	—	—
2003–04	CSKA–2 Moscow	RUS.3	3	0	2	2	2	—	—	—	—	—
2003–04	Khimik Voskresensk	RSL	28	1	2	3	26	—	—	—	—	—
2004–05	HK MVD	RUS.2	41	2	5	7	80	—	—	—	—	—
2004–05	Yunost Minsk	BLR	6	1	3	4	18	11	0	6	6	16
2005–06	Dinamo Minsk	BLR	55	8	18	26	76	10	2	2	4	32
2006–07	Dinamo Minsk	BLR	49	0	5	5	107	12	0	0	0	6
2007–08	Dinamo Minsk	BLR	51	2	11	13	93	8	0	0	0	16
2008–09	Krylya Sovetov Moscow	RUS.2	58	3	5	8	134	15	2	5	7	34
AHL totals			269	13	91	104	272	41	2	18	20	32
RSL totals			218	11	26	37	313	34	2	3	5	63
BLR totals			161	11	37	48	294	41	2	8	10	70

=== International ===
Year	Team	Event	GP	G	A	Pts	PIM
1993	Belarus	EJC B	4	0	2	2	10
1995	Belarus	WJC C1	4	0	1	1	6
1998	Belarus	OG	4	0	0	0	10
1999	Belarus	WC	6	0	0	0	4
2001	Belarus	OGQ	3	0	1	1	4
2001	Belarus	WC	6	0	1	1	4
2002	Belarus	OG	9	0	1	1	6
2002	Belarus	WC D1	5	0	1	1	2
2003	Belarus	WC	6	0	0	0	20
2005	Belarus	WC	6	0	0	0	12
2006	Belarus	WC	4	0	1	1	0
2007	Belarus	WC	6	0	0	0	6
2008	Belarus	WC	6	1	0	1	2
Junior totals			9	0	3	3	16
Senior totals			61	1	5	6	70
