= Ján Pardavý =

Slovak ice hockey player

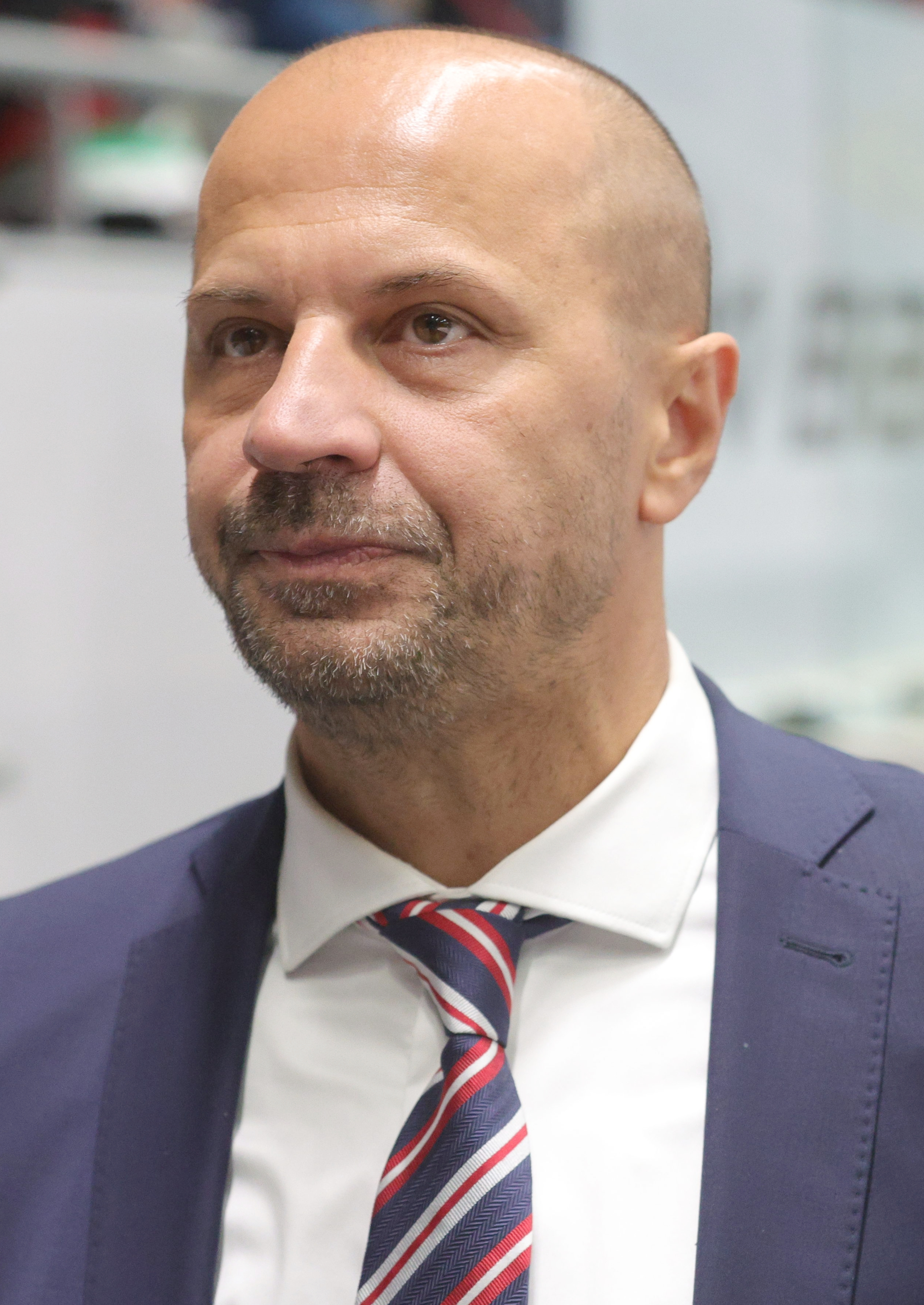
- Ján Pardavý, 2024
- Born: September 8, 1971 (age 53); Trenčín, Czechoslovakia
- Height: 6 ft 0 in (183 cm)
- Weight: 209 lb (95 kg; 14 st 13 lb)
- Position: Right Wing
- Shot: Left
- Played for: HK Dukla Trenčín; HC Vsetín; Djurgårdens IF; HPK; HC JME Znojemští Orli; Modo Hockey; Lokomotiv Yaroslavl; HC '05 Banská Bystrica; Étoile Noire de Strasbourg
- Current Slovak coach: RI OKNA Berani Zlín
- Coached for: MHK Dubnica; HK Dukla Trenčín
- National team: Slovakia
- NHL draft: Undrafted
- Playing career: 1990–2016
- Coaching career: 2016–present

Ján Pardavý (born 8 September 1971) is a Slovak professional ice hockey coach and former player. He competed in the men's tournaments at the 1998 Winter Olympics and the 2002 Winter Olympics.

== Career statistics ==
=== Regular season and playoffs ===
Bold indicates led league

			Regular season					Playoffs
Season	Team	League	GP	G	A	Pts	PIM	GP	G	A	Pts	PIM
1990–91	ASVŠ Dukla Trenčín	TCH	1	0	0	0	0	—	—	—	—	—
1991–92	ASVŠ Dukla Trenčín	TCH	7	0	1	1	2	—	—	—	—	—
1992–93	ASVŠ Dukla Trenčín	TCH	30	4	5	9	16	—	—	—	—	—
1993–94	Dukla Trenčín	SVK	42	17	6	23	36	—	—	—	—	—
1994–95	Dukla Trenčín	SVK	31	19	7	26	8	9	10	2	12	14
1995–96	Dukla Trenčín	SVK	46	15	14	29	143	—	—	—	—	—
1996–97	Dukla Trenčín	SVK	53	**42**	44	**86**	60	—	—	—	—	—
1997–98	Dukla Trenčín	SVK	37	14	17	31	54	—	—	—	—	—
1998–99	Dukla Trenčín	SVK	44	19	27	46	75	—	—	—	—	—
1999–2000	HC Slovnaft Vsetín	ELH	52	25	27	52	67	9	3	6	9	22
2000–01	HC Slovnaft Vsetín	ELH	46	12	25	37	46	14	**10**	2	12	14
2001–02	Djurgårdens IF	SEL	47	12	11	23	70	5	0	0	0	4
2002–03	HPK	SM-l	52	17	27	44	69	13	1	1	2	12
2003–04	HC JME Znojemští Orli	ELH	51	13	15	28	62	7	1	1	2	8
2004–05	HC JME Znojemští Orli	ELH	18	5	4	9	41	—	—	—	—	—
2004–05	Dukla Trenčín	SVK	23	9	15	24	83	9	4	1	5	16
2005–06	Modo Hockey	SEL	47	8	14	22	36	5	1	2	3	6
2006–07	Dukla Trenčín	SVK	41	19	16	35	50	14	6	7	13	22
2006–07	Lokomotiv Yaroslavl	RSL	4	1	0	1	0	—	—	—	—	—
2007–08	Dukla Trenčín	SVK	50	13	24	37	126	13	3	10	13	39
2008–09	HC ’05 Banská Bystrica	SVK	56	17	29	46	103	5	1	3	4	2
2009–10	HC ’05 Banská Bystrica	SVK	45	27	28	55	12	6	3	3	6	14
2010–11	Dukla Trenčín	SVK	53	14	32	46	34	9	2	1	3	6
2011–12	Dukla Trenčín	SVK	39	9	18	27	32	10	1	8	9	4
2012–13	Dukla Trenčín	SVK	49	14	28	42	41	4	0	0	0	2
2013–14	Étoile Noire de Strasbourg	FRA	26	19	26	45	20	4	0	1	1	4
2014–15	Étoile Noire de Strasbourg	FRA	26	8	17	25	8	5	0	4	4	4
2015–16	Étoile Noire de Strasbourg	FRA	22	10	15	25	6	—	—	—	—	—
SVK totals			609	248	305	553	857	79	30	35	65	119
ELH totals			167	55	71	126	216	30	14	9	23	44

=== International ===
Year	Team	Event	GP	G	A	Pts	PIM
1997	Slovakia	WC	8	3	1	4	8
1998	Slovakia	OG	4	1	0	1	0
1998	Slovakia	WC	6	2	2	4	6
1999	Slovakia	WC	6	1	0	1	4
2000	Slovakia	WC	7	0	1	1	10
2002	Slovakia	OG	4	2	1	3	14
Senior totals			44	12	9	21	46

"Jan Pardavy". Elite Prospects.
