= Andrey Rasolko =

Belarusian ice hockey player

Personal information
- Nationality: Belarusian
- Citizenship: Belarus
- Born: 13 September 1968 (age 56); Minsk, Belarus
- Occupation: ice hockey player

Sport
- Sport: Ice hockey
- Position: C

Andrey Rasolko (born 13 September 1968) is a Belarusian ice hockey player. He competed in the men's tournament at the 2002 Winter Olympics.

== Career statistics ==
=== Regular season and playoffs ===
			Regular season					Playoffs
Season	Team	League	GP	G	A	Pts	PIM	GP	G	A	Pts	PIM
1985–86	Dinamo Minsk	URS.2	2	0	3	3	0	—	—	—	—	—
1986–87	Dinamo Minsk	URS.2	55	24	5	29	40	—	—	—	—	—
1987–88	Dinamo Minsk	URS.2	58	11	5	16	34	—	—	—	—	—
1988–89	Dinamo Minsk	URS	25	5	7	12	8	—	—	—	—	—
1989–90	Dinamo Minsk	URS	41	8	7	15	16	—	—	—	—	—
1990–91	Dinamo Minsk	URS	27	8	2	10	8	—	—	—	—	—
1991–92	Dinamo Minsk	CIS	29	7	9	16	15	—	—	—	—	—
1992–93	Dinamo Minsk	IHL	34	3	7	10	28	—	—	—	—	—
1992–93	Tivali Minsk	BLR	11	5	7	12	8	—	—	—	—	—
1993–94	Podhale Nowy Targ	POL
1994–95	Avangard Omsk	IHL	48	14	15	29	20	3	1	0	1	0
1995–96	Avangard Omsk	IHL	49	14	12	26	18	3	1	0	1	0
1996–97	AaB Ishockey	DEN	46	47	38	85	126	—	—	—	—	—
1997–98	Avangard Omsk	RSL	15	2	4	6	8	—	—	—	—	—
1998–99	Severstal Cherepovets	RSL	34	5	11	16	20	2	0	0	0	2
1999–2000	Severstal Cherepovets	RSL	37	8	15	23	30	8	1	1	2	22
2000–01	Severstal Cherepovets	RSL	36	8	7	15	12	8	3	1	4	6
2001–02	Severstal Cherepovets	RSL	38	11	7	18	40	4	1	1	2	10
2002–03	Metallurg Novokuznetsk	RSL	1	0	0	0	0	—	—	—	—	—
2002–03	Neftekhimik Nizhnekamsk	RSL	19	3	1	4	14	—	—	—	—	—
2003–04	Yunost Minsk	BLR	41	21	24	45	74	10	4	7	11	8
2004–05	Yunost Minsk	BLR	35	14	17	31	24	12	3	4	7	12
URS/CIS totals			122	28	25	53	47	—	—	—	—	—
IHL totals			131	31	34	65	66	6	2	0	2	0
RSL totals			180	37	45	82	124	22	5	3	8	40

=== International ===
Year	Team	Event	GP	G	A	Pts	PIM
1986	Soviet Union	EJC	5	4	1	5	0
1988	Soviet Union	WJC	7	0	1	1	4
1996	Belarus	WC B	7	1	1	2	22
1997	Belarus	WC B	6	1	1	2	4
2001	Belarus	OGQ	3	0	0	0	4
2002	Belarus	OG	9	1	1	2	0
2002	Belarus	WC D1	5	2	0	2	2
2003	Belarus	WC	5	1	0	1	4
2004	Belarus	WC D1	5	2	3	5	2
Junior totals			12	4	2	6	4
Senior totals			40	8	6	14	34

"Andrei Rasolko". Elite Prospects.
