= Dan Schachte =

American ice hockey official (1958–2022)

- Born: July 13, 1958; Madison, Wisconsin, U.S.
- Died: September 6, 2022 (aged 64)

Daniel John Schachte (July 13, 1958 – September 6, 2022) was an American linesman in the National Hockey League (NHL). He was the first American-born official to oversee 2,000 NHL games.

== Early life ==
Schachte was born in Madison, Wisconsin, on July 13, 1958. He attended Monona Grove High School in nearby Monona, where he played hockey for the school's team. He then studied mechanical engineering at the University of Wisconsin–Madison. He played for its varsity reserve team under Bob Johnson, who assisted Schachte in becoming a hockey official for the Western Collegiate Hockey Association and the United States Hockey League.

In 1981, after several seasons of officiating amateur hockey games, Schachte met John McCauley – the NHL's associate director of officials – at an amateur sports festival in Syracuse, New York. They arranged a meeting at a hotel in Toronto prior to the 1982–83 season, at which Schachte signed an NHL linesman contract worth $22,000 per year.

== Career ==
Schachte officiated his first NHL game on October 1, 1982, at the Chicago Stadium, between the Chicago Blackhawks and Toronto Maple Leafs. He was assigned his first Stanley Cup playoff series after his fourth year of officiating in the league and went on to officiate in a playoff series for 26 consecutive years. One notable game he worked on was a January 21, 1992 match between the Buffalo Sabres and St. Louis Blues, in which Sabres player Alexander Mogilny slapped Schachte on the side of the head. Mogilny, who had just received a game misconduct penalty from referee Andy Van Hellemond, earned a second game misconduct in the same game and was consequently suspended for ten games under the NHL's Rule 67 covering abuse of officials.

Schachte ultimately officiated 2,009 regular-season games and 227 playoff games throughout his 30-year career. He worked in five Stanley Cup Finals (1997, 1998, 2000, 2001, and 2002). He was one of seven NHL officials selected by the International Ice Hockey Federation to work on games during the 2002 Winter Olympics, including the bronze medal game. He was also a linesman during the 1991 Canada Cup and 1996 World Cup of Hockey. Schachte worked his 1,500th NHL game on January 3, 2004, in a match between the St. Louis Blues and the San Jose Sharks. Eight years later, on February 18, 2012, in St. Louis, Missouri, Schachte became the fifth NHL official (and the first American-born) to officiate 2,000 games, in a match between the St. Louis Blues and the Minnesota Wild. He officiated his final NHL game one month later on March 18, 2012, between the Chicago Blackhawks and the Washington Capitals. His fellow officials in that game wore the number 47 (Schachte's uniform number) in his honor.

After retiring as an NHL referee, Schachte served as the Coordinator of Men's Officials for the Hockey East Association.

== Personal life ==
Schachte was married to his wife Kim until his death. Together, they had four children: Danny, Ian, Lauren, and Madeline. He initially resided in Verona, Wisconsin, before relocating to Middleton, Wisconsin during his later years. He eventually returned to Madison.

Schachte died on September 6, 2022. He was 64, and suffered from diabetes prior to his death.
