= Christian Künast =

German ice hockey player and coach

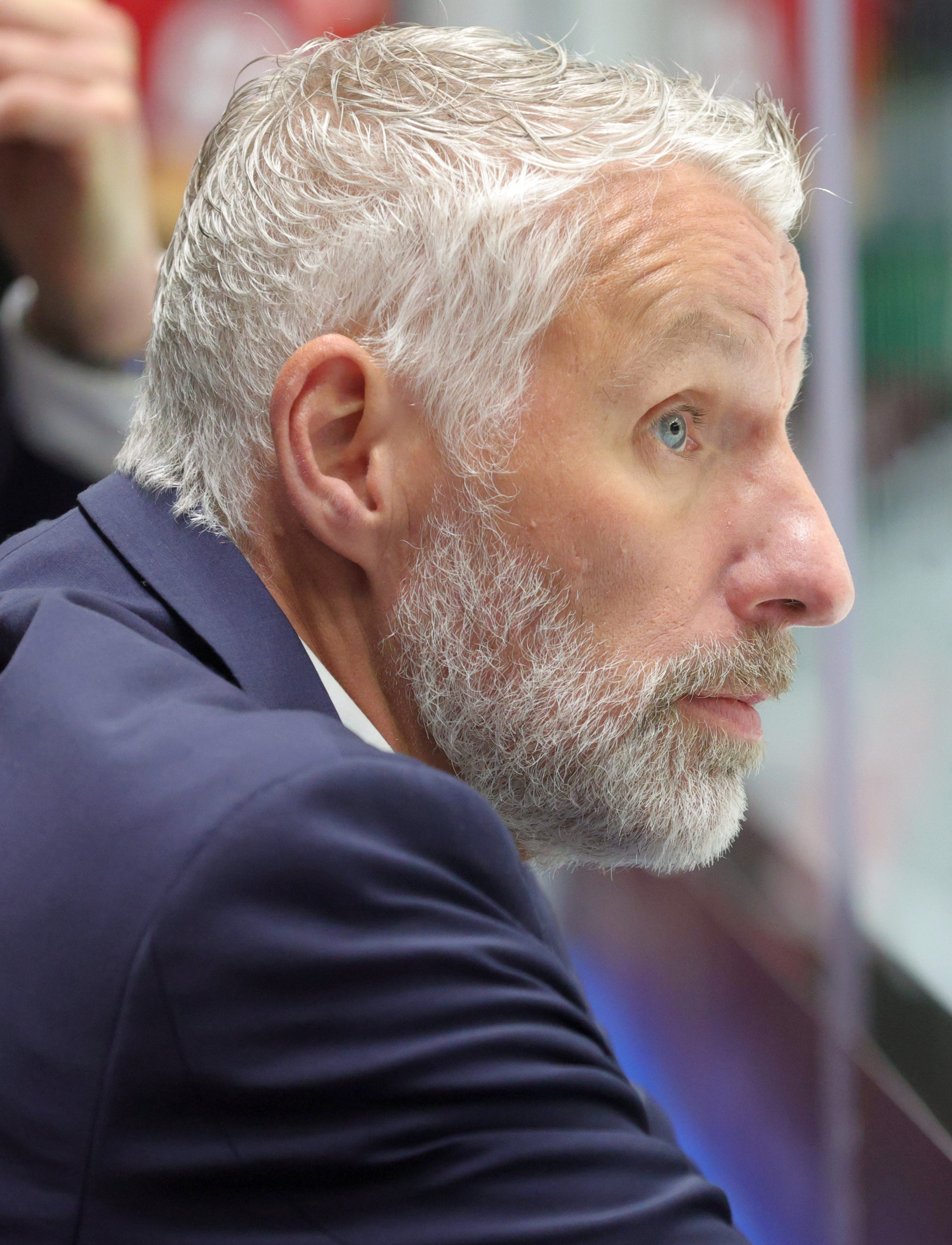
- Born: 3 July 1971 (age 53); Landshut, West Germany
- Height: 1.80 m (5 ft 11 in)
- Weight: 76 kg (168 lb; 12 st 0 lb)
- Position: Goaltender
- Caught: Left
- Played for: EV Landshut; Starbulls Rosenheim; ESV Kaufbeuren; Adler Mannheim; Munich Barons; Hamburg Freezers; Hannover Scorpions
- National team: Germany
- Playing career: 1988–2007

Christian Künast (born 7 March 1971) is a German retired ice hockey player and coach, who coached the German national team at the 2019 IIHF Women's World Championship.
