= Ben Crameri =

Australian rules footballer

Personal information
- Full name: Ben Crameri
- Born: 6 June 1936 (age 90)
- Height: 185 cm (6 ft 1 in)
- Weight: 89 kg (196 lb)

Playing career^{1}
Years	Club	Games (Goals)
1957–1958	Melbourne	3 (0)
- ^{1} Playing statistics correct to the end of 1958.

Ben Crameri (born 6 June 1936) is a former Australian rules footballer who played for the Melbourne Football Club in the Victorian Football League (VFL).

He coached Northcote from 1964 to 1967.
