= Mike Cvik =

Canadian ice hockey official (born 1962)

- Born: July 6, 1962 (age 64) Calgary, Alberta, Canada
- Height: 6 ft 9 in (206 cm)
- Position: Linesman
- Playing career: 1987–2016

Mike Cvik (born July 6, 1962) is a Canadian former National Hockey League linesman, who wore uniform number #88. At 6 foot, 9 Inches, Cvik was the same height as the NHL's tallest player, Zdeno Chára. He worked more than 1800 NHL games, including his highlights such as the gold medal game at the 2002 Winter Olympics, the NHL All-Star Game and the Stanley Cup Playoffs.

== Officiating career ==
A native of Calgary, Alberta, Cvik played minor hockey as a forward until he turned 17. Despite his size, Cvik was considered a "gentle giant"; he won awards for sportsmanship during his youth hockey days. He turned to officiating after being asked to help out at one of his brother's games. Cvik quickly earned his certification and soon was officiating in the Western Hockey League (WHL). Cvik officiated in the WHL for seven years, and worked the 1986 Memorial Cup tournament. Also in 1986, was hired by the National Hockey League (NHL). Cvik made his NHL debut as a linesman on October 8, 1987, in a game between the St. Louis Blues and Vancouver Canucks.

Among his highlights as an official, Cvik worked the 1998 NHL All-Star Game, was on the ice when Wayne Gretzky scored his 802nd career goal to become the NHL's all-time scoring leader and officiated the gold medal game at the 2002 Winter Olympics in Salt Lake City. the 2015–16 NHL season is the 29th and final season of his career; Cvik's final game as an official was on January 6, 2016 in a game between the Tampa Bay Lightning and Calgary Flames. Cvik was honoured by the Flames and their fans with a tribute and standing ovation during the game, while the players lined up to shake his hand at its conclusion. He was also named one of the game's three stars in arena and by the Rogers Sportsnet telecast. Cvik retired having worked 1,868 regular season games – seventh all-time among NHL linesmen – and 90 post-season contests.
