= 1989–90 Nationalliga A season =

Swiss professional ice hockey season

The 1989–90 Nationalliga A season was the 52nd season of the Nationalliga A, the top level of ice hockey in Switzerland. 10 teams participated in the league, and HC Lugano won the championship.

== Regular season ==
Pl.	Team	GP	W	T	L	GF–GA	Pts
1.	HC Lugano	36	22	6	8	182 : 98	50
2.	SC Bern	36	22	6	8	162 : 101	50
3.	EHC Biel	36	22	3	11	194 : 141	47
4.	EHC Kloten	36	21	2	13	169 : 131	44
5.	EHC Olten	36	16	3	17	138 : 161	35
6.	EV Zug	36	13	4	19	149 : 169	30
7.	Fribourg-Gottéron	36	13	4	19	134 : 167	30
8.	HC Ambrì-Piotta	36	13	3	20	132 : 164	29
9.	Zürcher SC	36	10	6	20	119 : 166	26
10.	HC Ajoie	36	8	3	25	108 : 189	19

== Playoffs ==
Quarterfinals
1.	HC Lugano	3
8.	HC Ambrì-Piotta	1
4.	EHC Kloten	6
5.	EHC Olten	0
3.	EHC Biel	2
6.	EV Zug	1
2.	SC Bern	4
7.	Fribourg-Gottéron	3

Semifinals
HC Lugano	5
EHC Kloten	4
EHC Biel	4
SC Bern	3

Finals
HC Lugano	5
SC Bern	1

== Relegation ==
Pl.	Team	GP	W	T	L	GF–GA	Pts.
1.	HC Sierre	10	6	2	2	56:38	14
2.	Zürcher SC	10	5	3	2	54:36	13
3.	HC Martigny	10	4	2	4	41:33	10
4.	SC Rapperswil	10	4	2	4	36:38	10
5.	HC Ajoie	10	3	1	6	33:42	7
6.	SC Herisau	10	1	4	5	28:61	6
