= 1991–92 Nationalliga A season =

Ice hockey season in Switzerland

The 1991–92 NLA season was the 54th regular season of the Nationalliga A, the main professional ice hockey league in Switzerland.

== Regular season ==
=== Final standings ===
	Team	GP	W	L	T	GF	GA	Pts
1.	HC Fribourg-Gottéron	36	25	6	5	186	99	55
2.	HC Lugano	36	23	8	5	151	92	51
3.	SC Bern	36	21	9	6	142	98	48
4.	HC Ambri-Piotta	36	22	12	2	157	117	46
5.	EV Zug	36	16	15	5	133	129	37
6.	EHC Kloten	36	14	15	7	139	124	35
7.	Zürcher SC	36	11	19	6	140	168	28
8.	EHC Biel	36	8	21	7	105	179	23
9.	EHC Olten	36	8	25	3	102	191	19
10.	EHC Chur	36	6	24	6	134	192	18

=== Scoring leaders ===
Note: G = Goals; A = Assists; Pts = Points

Player	Team	G	A	Pts
Vyacheslav Bykov	HC Fribourg-Gottéron	38	47	85
Andrei Khomutov	HC Fribourg-Gottéron	31	43	74
Petr Malkov	HC Ambri-Piotta	23	41	64
Robert Lavoie	EHC Chur	36	17	53
Yuri Leonov	HC Ambri-Piotta	26	25	51
Gilles Thibaudeau	HC Lugano	29	17	46
Chad Silver	HC Fribourg-Gottéron	23	21	44
Peter Jaks	HC Ambri-Piotta	22	20	42
Aleš Polcar	EHC Olten	14	26	40
Keith Fair	HC Ambri-Piotta	18	21	39

== Playoffs ==
=== Quarterfinals ===
Fribourg-Gottéron (1) vs. EHC Biel (8)
Away	Home	
EHC Biel 3	2 Fribourg-Gottéron	n.P.
Fribourg-Gottéron 4	3 EHC Biel	OT
EHC Biel 2	11 Fribourg-Gottéron	
Fribourg-Gottéron 8	4 EHC Biel	
Fribourg-Gottéron wins series 3–1

SC Bern (3) vs. EHC Kloten (6)
Away	Home
EHC Kloten 0	2 SC Bern
SC Bern 2	1 EHC Kloten
EHC Kloten 1	5 SC Bern
SC Bern wins series 3–0

HC Lugano (2) vs. Zürcher SC (7)
Away	Home	
Zürcher SC 4	3 HC Lugano	n.P.
HC Lugano 2	4 Zürcher SC	
Zürcher SC 0	10 HC Lugano	
HC Lugano 3	4 Zürcher SC	n.P.
Zürcher SC wins series 3–1

HC Ambri-Piotta (4) vs. EV Zug (5)
Away	Home
EV Zug 2	3 HC Ambri-Piotta
HC Ambri-Piotta 1	5 EV Zug
EV Zug 5	6 HC Ambri-Piotta
HC Ambri-Piotta 2	6 EV Zug
EV Zug 2	3 HC Ambri-Piotta
HC Ambri-Piotta wins series 3–2

=== Semifinals ===
Fribourg-Gottéron vs. HC Ambri-Piotta
Away	Home	
HC Ambri-Piotta 2	5 Fribourg-Gottéron	
Fribourg-Gottéron 0	3 HC Ambri-Piotta	
HC Ambri-Piotta 3	4 Fribourg-Gottéron	
Fribourg-Gottéron 3	6 HC Ambri-Piotta	
HC Ambri-Piotta 4	5 Fribourg-Gottéron	OT
Fribourg-Gottéron wins series 3–2

SC Bern vs. Zürcher SC
Away	Home	
Zürcher SC 1	2 SC Bern	OT
SC Bern 4	1 Zürcher SC	.
Zürcher SC 4	7 SC Bern	
SC Bern wins series 3–0

=== Finals ===
Fribourg-Gottéron vs. SC Bern
Away	Home
SC Bern 4	3 Fribourg-Gottéron
Fribourg-Gottéron 2	11 SC Bern
SC Bern 1	5 Fribourg-Gottéron
Fribourg-Gottéron 3	0 SC Bern
SC Bern 4	1 Fribourg-Gottéron
SC Bern wins series 3–2

=== Scoring leaders ===
Note: G = Goals; A = Assists; Pts = Points

Player	Team	G	A	Pts
Andrei Khomutov	HC Fribourg-Gottéron	38	47	85
Chad Silver	HC Fribourg-Gottéron	31	43	74
Vyacheslav Bykov	HC Fribourg-Gottéron	23	41	64
Peter Jaks	HC Ambri-Piotta	36	17	53
Alan Haworth	SC Bern	26	25	51
Patrick Howald	SC Bern	29	17	46
