= 1994–95 Nationalliga A season =

Swiss professional ice hockey season

The 1994–95 Nationalliga A season was the 57th season of the Nationalliga A, the top level of ice hockey in Switzerland. 10 teams participated in the league, and EHC Kloten won the championship.

== Regular season ==
Pl.	Team	GP	W	T	L	GF–GA	Pts.
1.	EV Zug	36	22	4	10	152 : 125	48
2.	HC Lugano	36	21	5	10	147 : 102	47
3.	HC Ambrì-Piotta	36	19	5	12	151 : 136	43
4.	HC Davos	36	19	4	13	139 : 125	42
5.	HC Fribourg-Gottéron	36	18	5	13	177 : 140	41
6.	SC Bern	36	18	3	15	146 : 123	39
7.	EHC Kloten	36	15	8	13	116 : 119	38
8.	Zürcher SC	36	12	3	21	129 : 152	27
9.	SC Rapperswil-Jona	36	8	3	25	102 : 165	19
10.	EHC Biel	36	7	2	27	108 : 170	16

== Playoffs ==
=== Quarterfinals ===
- EV Zug - Zurcher SC 3–2 on series
- HC Fribourg-Gotteron - HC Davos 3–2 on series
- HC Ambri-Piotta - SC Bern 0–3 on series
- EHC Kloten - HC Lugano 3–2 on series

=== Semifinals ===
- EV Zug - HC Fribourg-Gotteron 3–0 on series
- SC Bern - EHC Kloten 0–3 on series

=== Final ===
- EV Zug - EHC Kloten 1–3 on series

== Playouts ==
SC Rapperswil-Jona versus EHC Biel
Auswärts	Heim	
EHC Biel 0	7 Rapperswil-Jona	
Rapperswil-Jona 5	4 EHC Biel	SO
EHC Biel 4	5 Rapperswil-Jona	SO
Rapperswil-Jona wins series 3–0
