= 1999–2000 Nationalliga A season =

Swiss professional ice hockey season

The 1999–2000 Nationalliga A season was the 62nd season of the Nationalliga A, the top level of ice hockey in Switzerland. 10 teams participated in the league, and the ZSC Lions won the championship.

== Regular season ==
Pl.	Team	GP	W	T	L	GF–GA	Pts.
1.	HC Lugano	45	29	9	7	164 : 83	67
2.	ZSC Lions	45	26	4	15	143 : 99	56
3.	EV Zug	45	24	6	15	154 : 148	54
4.	HC Ambrì-Piotta	45	24	4	17	147 : 116	52
5.	SC Bern	45	19	7	19	134 : 130	45
6.	Kloten Flyers	45	19	5	21	116 : 129	43
7.	HC Davos	45	15	6	24	123 : 147	36
8.	HC Fribourg-Gottéron	45	14	6	25	132 : 153	34
9.	SC Rapperswil-Jona	45	13	6	26	127 : 173	32
10.	SCL Tigers	45	12	7	26	102 : 164	31

== Playoffs ==
=== Quarterfinals ===
Home	Away
HC Lugano 7	1 Fribourg-Gottéron
Fribourg-Gottéron 2	4 HC Lugano
HC Lugano 5	2 Fribourg-Gottéron
Fribourg-Gottéron 0	5 HC Lugano
HC Lugano gewinnt die Serie 4:0

Home	Away	
EV Zug 3	2 Kloten Flyers	n.V.
Kloten Flyers 2	3 EV Zug	n.V.
EV Zug 0	3 Kloten Flyers	
Kloten Flyers 6	3 EV Zug	
EV Zug 3	0 Kloten Flyers	
Kloten Flyers 2	1 EV Zug	n.V.
EV Zug 4	1 Kloten Flyers	
EV Zug wins series 4:3

Home	Away
ZSC Lions 4	2 HC Davos
HC Davos 1	3 ZSC Lions
ZSC Lions 2	3 HC Davos
HC Davos 2	4 ZSC Lions
ZSC Lions 8	1 HC Davos
ZSC Lions wins series 4:1

Home	Away
HC Ambri-Piotta 5	1 SC Bern
SC Bern 4	1 HC Ambri-Piotta
HC Ambri-Piotta 3	1 SC Bern
SC Bern 0	4 HC Ambri-Piotta
HC Ambri-Piotta 6	1 SC Bern
HC Ambri-Piotta wins series 4:1

=== Semifinals ===
Home	Away
HC Lugano 6	3 Ambrì-Piotta
Ambrì-Piotta 1	4 HC Lugano
HC Lugano 6	2 Ambrì-Piotta
Ambrì-Piotta 2	4 HC Lugano
HC Lugano wins series 4:0

Home	Away
ZSC Lions 3	2 EV Zug
EV Zug 1	4 ZSC Lions
ZSC Lions 6	2 EV Zug
EV Zug 2	4 ZSC Lions
ZSC Lions wins series 4:0

=== Final ===
Home	Away	
HC Lugano 5	2 ZSC Lions	
ZSC Lions 3	2 HC Lugano	
HC Lugano 2	3 ZSC Lions	
ZSC Lions 3	1 HC Lugano	
HC Lugano 4	3 ZSC Lions	OT
ZSC Lions 4	3 HC Lugano	
ZSC Lions wins series 4:2

== Relegation ==
Home	Away
SC Rapperswil-Jona 2	5 SCL Tigers
SCL Tigers 1	4 SC Rapperswil-Jona
SC Rapperswil-Jona 0	4 SCL Tigers
SCL Tigers 4	2 SC Rapperswil-Jona
SC Rapperswil-Jona 5	1 SCL Tigers
SCL Tigers 3	0 SC Rapperswil-Jona
SC Langnau wins series 4:2
