= 1996–97 Nationalliga A season =

Swiss professional ice hockey season

The 1996–97 NLA season was the 59th regular season of the Nationalliga A.

== Regular season ==
=== Final standings ===
	Team	GP	W	L	T	GF	GA	Pts
1.	SC Bern	36	23	11	2	155	108	48
2.	EV Zug	36	22	11	3	158	109	47
3.	EHC Kloten	36	18	13	5	120	101	41
4.	HC Fribourg-Gottéron	36	17	14	5	135	110	39
5.	HC Davos	36	19	16	1	147	135	39
6.	HC Lugano	36	17	15	4	137	125	38
7.	ZSC Lions	36	16	19	1	123	149	33
8.	SC Rapperswil-Jona	36	14	20	2	111	127	30
9.	HC Ambri-Piotta	36	12	22	2	119	138	26
10.	HC La Chaux-de-Fonds	36	9	26	1	103	196	19

=== Master Round ===
	Team	GP	W	L	T	GF	GA	Pts
1.	SC Bern	46	29	15	2	205	140	60
2.	EV Zug	46	26	15	5	188	142	57
3.	HC Davos	46	24	20	2	187	181	50
4.	EHC Kloten	46	21	18	7	152	131	49
5.	HC Lugano	46	22	19	5	166	153	49
6.	HC Fribourg-Gottéron	46	20	19	7	167	154	47

=== Qualification round ===
	Team	GP	W	L	T	GF	GA	Pts
7.	SC Rapperswil-Jona	45	21	22	2	156	163	44
8.	ZSC Lions	45	19	24	2	155	188	40
9.	HC Ambri-Piotta	45	17	25	3	153	165	37
10.	HC La Chaux-de-Fonds	45	11	33	1	131	243	23

== Playoffs ==
=== Quarterfinals ===
SC Bern (1) vs. ZSC Lions (8)
Away	Home
ZSC Lions 5	3 SC Bern
SC Bern 1	3 ZSC Lions
ZSC Lions 2	7 SC Bern
SC Bern 5	2 ZSC Lions
ZSC Lions 2	5 SC Bern
SC Bern wins series 3–2

HC Davos (3) vs. Fribourg-Gottéron (6)
Date	Away	Home
Fribourg-Gottéron 3	4 HC Davos	
HC Davos 5	4 Fribourg-Gottéron	OT
Fribourg-Gottéron 3	4 HC Davos	
HC Davos wins series 3–0

EV Zug (2) vs. SC Rapperswil-Jona (7)
Away	Home
SC Rapperswil-Jona 1	2 EV Zug
EV Zug 2	0 SC Rapperswil-Jona
SC Rapperswil-Jona 1	3 EV Zug
EV Zug wins series 3–0

EHC Kloten (4) vs. HC Lugano (5)
Date	Away	Home
HC Lugano 3	5 EHC Kloten	
EHC Kloten 2	3 HC Lugano	
HC Lugano 3	2 EHC Kloten	OT
EHC Kloten 1	7 HC Lugano	
HC Lugano wins series 3–1

=== Semifinals ===
SC Bern vs. HC Lugano
Away	Home	
HC Lugano 0	1 SC Bern	OT
SC Bern 1	3 HC Lugano	
HC Lugano 3	6 SC Bern	
SC Bern 6	3 HC Lugano	
SC Bern wins series 3–1

EV Zug vs. HC Davos
Date	Away	Home
HC Davos 1	2 EV Zug	
EV Zug 4	3 HC Davos	n.P.
HC Davos 4	6 EV Zug	
EV Zug wins series 3–0

=== Finals ===
SC Bern vs. EV Zug
Away	Home	
EV Zug 4	1 SC Bern	
SC Bern 5	2 EV Zug	
EV Zug 2	3 SC Bern	OT
SC Bern 4	0 EV Zug	
SC Bern wins series 3–1
