= 1995–96 Nationalliga A season =

Swiss professional ice hockey season

The 1995–96 Nationalliga A season was the 58th season of the Nationalliga A, the top level of ice hockey in Switzerland. 10 teams participated in the league, and EHC Kloten won the championship.

== Regular season ==
Pl.	Team	GP	W	T	L	GF–GA	Pts.
1.	SC Bern	36	21	4	11	139 : 98	46
2.	EHC Kloten	36	20	6	10	109 : 83	46
3.	SC Rapperswil-Jona	36	18	5	13	137 : 127	41
4.	EV Zug	36	18	3	15	149 : 129	39
5.	HC Davos	36	15	9	12	140 : 124	39
6.	HC Ambrì-Piotta	36	16	0	14	142 : 139	38
7.	HC Lugano	36	16	4	16	129 : 114	36
8.	Zürcher SC	36	16	3	17	119 : 140	35
9.	HC Fribourg-Gottéron	36	11	8	17	114 : 116	30
10.	HC Lausanne	36	4	2	30	71 : 179	10

== Playoffs ==
=== Quarterfinals ===
SC Bern (1) vs Zürcher SC (8)
Away	Home
Zürcher SC 1	7 SC Bern
SC Bern 4	5 Zürcher SC
Zürcher SC 1	5 SC Bern
SC Bern 5	2 Zürcher SC
SC Bern wins series 3–1

EV Zug (4) vs HC Davos (5)
Away	Home	
HC Davos 2	3 EV Zug	OT
EV Zug 3	5 HC Davos	
HC Davos 6	7 EV Zug	OT
EV Zug 2	3 HC Davos	
HC Davos 2	3 EV Zug	
EV Zug wins series 3–2

HC Ambrì-Piotta (6) vs SC Rapperswil-Jona (3)
Away	Home
HC Ambrì-Piotta 4	3 SC Rapperswil-Jona
SC Rapperswil-Jona 3	6 HC Ambrì-Piotta
HC Ambrì-Piotta 4	6 SC Rapperswil-Jona
SC Rapperswil-Jona 2	4 HC Ambrì-Piotta
Ambrì-Piotta wins series 3–1

EHC Kloten (2) vs HC Lugano (7)
Away	Home
HC Lugano 1	3 EHC Kloten
EHC Kloten 1	5 HC Lugano
HC Lugano 1	3 EHC Kloten
EHC Kloten 2	1 HC Lugano
EHC Kloten wins series 3–1

=== Semifinals ===
SC Bern vs EV Zug
Away	Home
EV Zug 1	6 SC Bern
SC Bern 4	3 EV Zug
EV Zug 4	1 SC Bern
SC Bern 4	2 EV Zug
SC Bern wins series 3–1

EHC Kloten vs HC Ambrì-Piotta
Away	Home	
HC Ambrì-Piotta 3	5 EHC Kloten	
EHC Kloten 5	4 HC Ambrì-Piotta	OT
HC Ambrì-Piotta 0	7 EHC Kloten	
EHC Kloten wins series 3–0

=== Final ===
SC Bern vs EHC Kloten
Away	Home
EHC Kloten 2	1 SC Bern
SC Bern 4	6 EHC Kloten
EHC Kloten 5	1 SC Bern
EHC Kloten wins series 3–0

=== Playouts ===
HC Lausanne vs HC Fribourg-Gottéron
Away	Home
HC Lausanne 1	5 HC Fribourg-Gottéron
HC Fribourg-Gottéron 7	2 HC Lausanne
HC Lausanne 1	3 HC Fribourg-Gottéron
HC Fribourg-Gottéron 4	3 HC Lausanne
HC Fribourg-Gottéron wins series 4–0
