= 1995 Men's Ice Hockey World Championships =

Ice hockey world championships on different levels

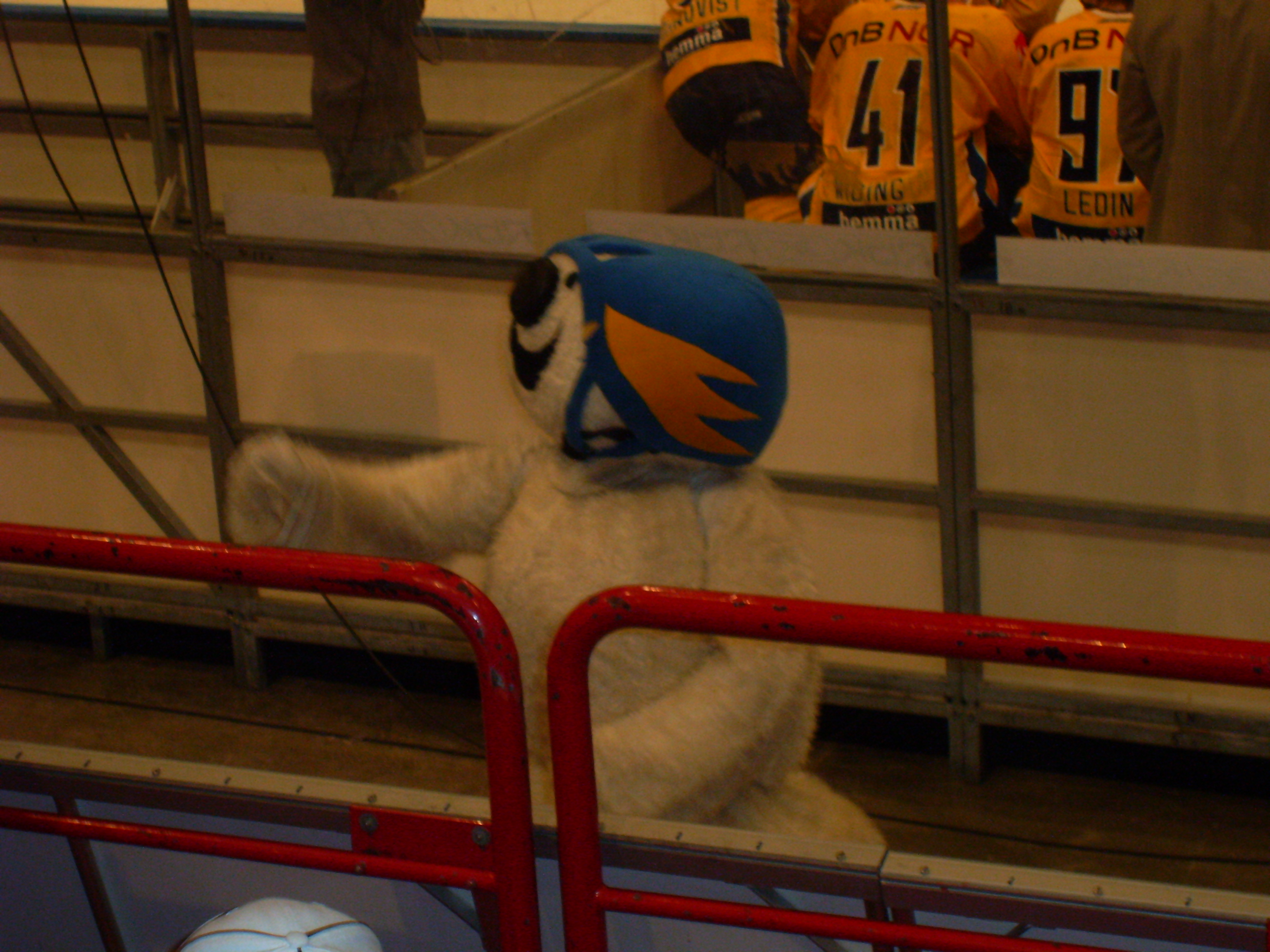
- Tournament mascot Snowy

Tournament details
- Host country: Sweden
- Venue(s): 2 (in 2 host cities)
- Dates: 23 April – 7 May
- Teams: 12

Final positions
- Champions: Finland (1st title)
- Runners-up: Sweden
- Third place: Canada
- Fourth place: Czech Republic

Tournament statistics
- Games played: 40
- Goals scored: 229 (5.73 per game)
- Attendance: 326,571 (8,164 per game)
- Scoring leader(s): (Canada) Andrew McKim 14 points

The 1995 Men's Ice Hockey World Championships was the 59th such event sanctioned by the International Ice Hockey Federation (IIHF). Teams representing 39 countries participated in several levels of competition. The competition also served as qualifications for group placements in the 1996 competition.

The top Championship Group tournament took place in Sweden from 23 April to 7 May 1995, with games played in Stockholm and Gävle. In the tournament final, Finland won the gold medal by defeating Sweden 4–1 at the Globen arena in Stockholm. The Finnish goals were scored by Timo Jutila and Ville Peltonen, who scored a hat trick. The gold medal was the first in Finland's history. Sweden had written a fight song, "Den glider in", which also was intended to be the official song of the championships. After the finals, the song became very popular in Finland. The final still has an important place in Finnish hockey culture today, a common exclamation being "95: Never forget!"

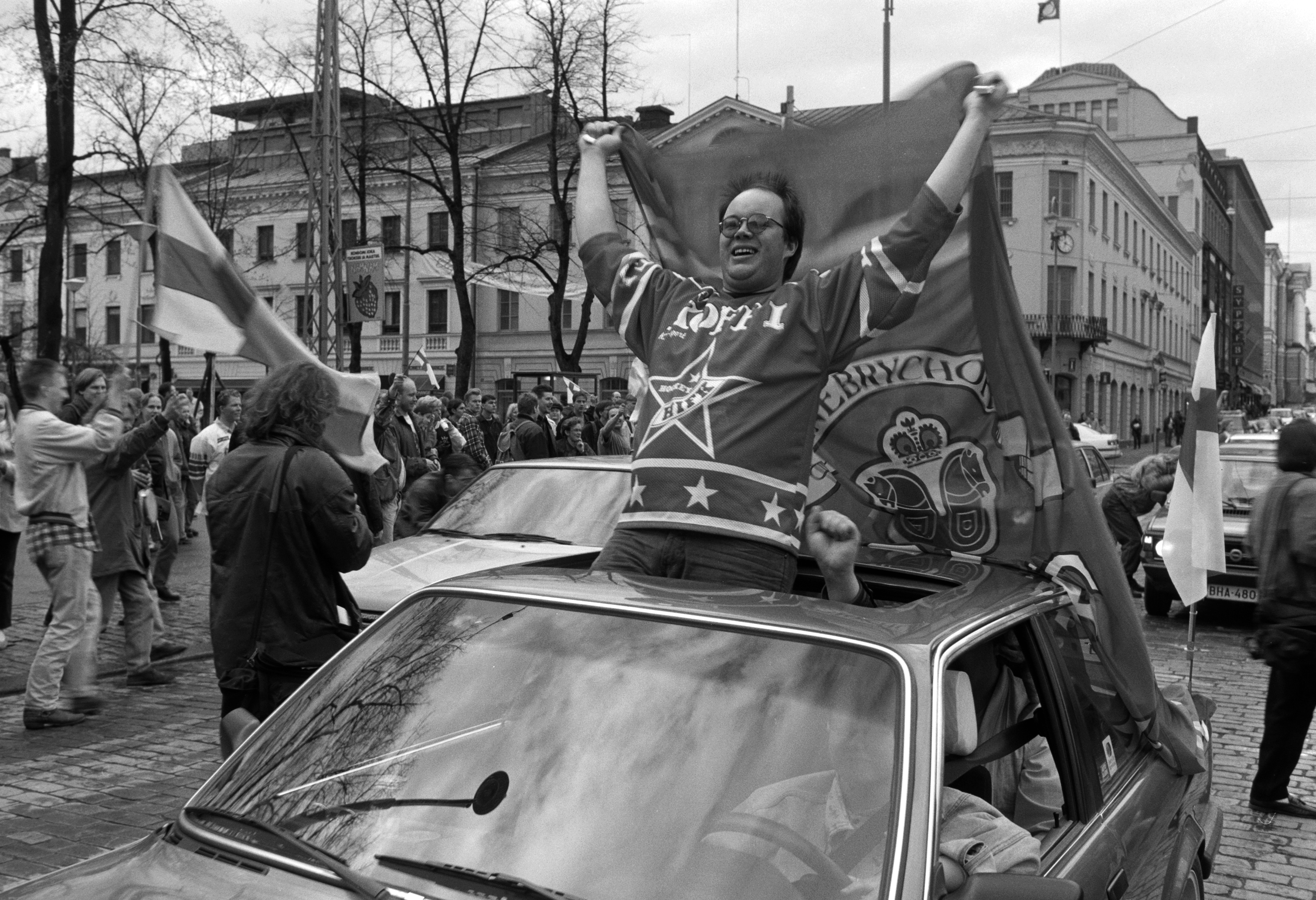
Victory celebration in Helsinki, Finland a few hours after the final game

Because of the 1994–95 NHL lockout, it originally created a dream scenario for the tournament hosts. With a cancelled NHL season, all NHL players free from injuries would have been available. But when the NHL season began in late January 1995, it instead created a scenario where fewer NHL players than usual became available. The Canadian and American teams would logically be hit the hardest, but the Americans found a way to lead their group in the first round. The Canadians, who struggled in the early tournament, beat the Americans in the quarter-finals, lasted until overtime against Sweden in the semifinal, and then beat the Czechs for the bronze. Andrew McKim, playing in the minors for the Adirondack Red Wings, ended up being the tournament scoring leader.

== World Championship Group A (Sweden) ==
=== Locations ===
Globen Capacity: 13 850	Gavlerinken Capacity: 8 265
Globen	Gavlerinken
(Sweden) Stockholm	(Sweden) Gävle

=== First round ===
==== Group 1 ====
Pos	Team	Pld	W	D	L	GF	GA	GD	Pts
1	Russia	5	5	0	0	26	10	+16	10
2	Italy	5	3	1	1	14	11	+3	7
3	France	5	3	0	2	14	11	+3	6
4	Canada	5	2	1	2	17	16	+1	5
5	Germany	5	1	0	4	11	20	−9	2
6	Switzerland	5	0	0	5	10	24	−14	0

23 April	France	4–0 (2–0, 1–0, 1–1)	Germany	Gävle; Attendance: 3,167

12.02 Serge Poudrier (Bozon, Pouget); 19.03 Michel Galarneau (Zytynsky); 21.07 Stephane Barin (Ville); 44.28 Stephane Barin (Ville) / Goals

23 April	Russia	4–2 (1–0, 0–0, 3–2)	Italy	Gävle

11.11 Aleksei Salomatin (Frolov, Fedulov); 50.05 Andrei Tarasenko (Belov); 56.12 Stanislav Romanov (Tarasenko); 58.21 Sergei Berezin (Bykov, Homutov) / Goals / 49.43 Gaetano Orlando (Topatigh); 51.08 Stephan Figliuzzi

24 April	Germany	1–2 (0–0, 1–1, 0–1)	Italy	Gävle; Attendance: 2,696

35.33 Benoit Doucet / Goals / 33.38 Maurizio Mansi (Figliuzzi); 49.12 Giorgio Comploi (Chitarroni, Massara)

24 April	Switzerland	3–5 (1–3, 2–0, 0–2)	Canada	Gävle; Attendance: 2,909

17.49 Sandro Bertaggia (Balmer, Weber); 24.12 Andy Ton (Weber); 35.24 Andy Ton PP / Goals / 5.05 Fraser (Heward, Convery); 7.28 Luciano Borsato (Fraser) PP; 17.49 Sandro Bertaggia (Balmer, Weber) PP; 52.35 Raffaele Intranuovo (Mckim; 55.50 Andrew McKim PP

25 April	Canada	1–4 (1–3, 0–1, 0–0)	France	Gävle

8.50 Rafaele Intranuovo (Borsato, Fraser) / Goals / 3.41 Philippe Bozon (Pouget); 4.07 Jean Marc Soghomonian (Zytynsky); 13.26 Christian Pouget; 39.02 Christian Pouget (Bozon)

25 April	Russia	8–0 (0–0, 5–0, 3–0)	Switzerland	Gävle; Attendance: 3,442

24.18 Oleg Belov (Fokin); 24.59 Aleksei Salomatin (Torgajev, Frolov); 33.00 Vyacheslav Bykov (Smirnov); 33.22 Sergei Berezin; 34.40 Oleg Belov (Sorokin); 42.14 Stanislav Romanov; 43.04 Sergei Berezin; 58.14 Sergei Berezin (Smirnov, Homutov) / Goals

26 April	France	1–3 (0–1, 0–1, 1–1)	Russia	Gävle; Attendance: 3,040

54.13 Serge Poudier (Bozon) / Goals / 7.12 Vyacheslav Bykov (Berezin); 25.48 Aleksandr Prokopjev (Frolov, Vorobjev); 46.38 Sergei Berezin (Fedulov, Frolov)

27 April	Canada	5–2 (1–1, 1–0, 3–1)	Germany	Gävle; Attendance: 4,358

19.09 Andrew McKim (Chernomaz); 27.51 Andrew McKim; 45.15 Jean Francois Jomphe (Bright); 56.33 Chris Coveradis (McKim) PP; 57.53 Andrew McKim (Fraser, Intranuovo) / Goals / 2.33 Thomas Brandl (Stefan) PP; 47.02 Thomas Brandl (Wieland)

27 April	Italy	3–2 (0–1, 1–1, 2–1)	Switzerland	Gävle; Attendance: 3,956

35.45 Giorgio Comploi (Figliuzzi); 44.59 John Massara (Bartolone, Oberrauch); Maurizio Mansi (Nardella) / Goals / 5.51 Vjeran Ivankovic (Rogenmoser); 25.15 Jean-Jaques Aeschlimann (Bayer, Bruderer)

28 April	Germany	3–6 (1–0, 1–5, 1–1)	Russia	Gävle; Attendance: 3,810

16.14 Benoit Doucet (Hiemer); 20.23 Jayson Mayer (Hindemann) PP; 52.50 Torsten Kienass (Brandl, Stefan) / Goals / 29.05 Sergei Sorokin PP; 29.57 Sergei Berezin; 33.01 Andrei Homutov (Shendelev, Smirnov); 34.15 Stanislav Romanov (Skopintsev) PP; 39.04 Sergei Berezin (Homutov); 46.34 Igor Fedulov PP

28 April	Switzerland	2–3 (0–1, 1–1, 1–1)	France	Gävle; Attendance: 3,684

28.18 Patrick Howald Triulzi PP; 42.08 Vjeran Ivankovic (Zehnder) / Goals / 4.08 Serge Poudier (Pouget) PP; 32.14 Serge Poudier (Pouget); 44.59 Philippe Bozon (Pouget)

29 April	Canada	2–2 (1–0, 0–0, 1–2)	Italy	Gävle; Attendance: 4,962

9.56 Todd Hlushko (Bright); 43.40 Mark Freer (Maneluk) / Goals / 42.28 Roland Ramoser (De Toni, Chelodi); 46.03 Stefano Figliuzzi (Busillo)

30 April	Germany	5–3 (1–0, 2–1, 2–2)	Switzerland	Gävle; Attendance: 6,293

1.20 Andreas Niederberger (Pyka); 26.35 Benoit Doucet (Lűndemann, Lupzig) PP; 32.16 Thomas Brandl (Lűndemann, Meyer) PP; 40.15 Thomas Brandl (Hilger) PP; 53.47 Thomas Brandl (Lupzig, Hiemer) / Goals / 37.51 Andy Ton (Erni); 47.46 Martin Bruderer; 55.04 Andy Ton (Ivankovic, Weber)

30 April	Russia	5–4 (2–1, 1–1, 2–2)	Canada	Gävle; Attendance: 6,293

3.29 Aleksandr Prokobjev (Vorobjev, Sorokin) PP; 13.56 Igor Fedulov (Torgajev, Salomatin); 30.06 Andrei Skopintsev (Tarasenko, Romanov); 41.04 Sergei Shendelev (Smirnov) PP; 54.53 Stanislav Romanov (Tarasenko) / Goals / 19.46 Rafaele Intranuovo (McKim, Schlegel); 23.57 Jamie Heward (McKim) PP; 56.40 Todd Hlushko (Chernomaz); 58.44 Andrew McKim (Schlegel, DeGray)

1 May	Italy	5–2 (1–0, 2–0, 2–2)	France	Gävle; Attendance: 2,700

15.27 Mario Chitarroni; 22.26 Giuseppe Busillo (Stefano Figliuzzi, Mansi); 39.38 Maurizio Mansi (Orlando); 50.30 Martin Pavlu (Oberrauch, Ramoser); 53.17 Martin Pavlu (Orlando) / Goals / 52.32 Jean-Phil LeMoine (Pouget, LeMarque); 56.57 Frank Pajonkowski (Galarneau)

==== Group 2 ====
Pos	Team	Pld	W	D	L	GF	GA	GD	Pts
1	United States	5	3	2	0	17	11	+6	8
2	Finland	5	3	1	1	22	14	+8	7
3	Sweden	5	3	1	1	17	9	+8	7
4	Czech Republic	5	3	0	2	14	9	+5	6
5	Norway	5	1	0	4	9	18	−9	2
6	Austria	5	0	0	5	9	27	−18	0

23 April	Sweden	5–0 (0–0, 2–0, 3–0)	Norway	Stockholm; Attendance: 11,854

Referee:
(Germany) Peter Slapke

Per-Erik Eklund − 35.23	1–0
Andreas Johansson − 36.32	2–0
Andreas Johansson − 53.53	3–0
Mikael Johansson − 54.44	4–0
Jonas Johnson − 59.05	5–0

14 min
Penalties
16 min

23 April	Finland	0–3 (0–1, 0–0, 0–2)	Czech Republic	Stockholm; Attendance: 11,462

Referee:
Gerald Burt

0–1	18:24 – Radek Belohlah
0–2	57:24 – Roman Meluzín
0–3	59:23 – Jiří Dopita

22 min
Penalties
14 min

24 April	Austria	2–5 (1–3, 0–1, 1–1)	United States	Stockholm; Attendance: 6,817

25 April	United States	2–1 (2–0, 0–0, 0–1)	Norway	Stockholm

Jon Morris – 00:59	1–0
Jon Morris – 16:07	2–0
	2–1	48:37 – Trond Magnussen

25 April	Sweden	3–6 (1–0, 2–3, 0–3)	Finland	Stockholm; Attendance: 13,850

Referee:
Rob Hearn

Daniel Alfredsson – 02:36	1–0
Andreas Dackell – 32:34	2–0
	2–1	35:34 – Saku Koivu
	2–2	36:08 – Mika Nieminen
Andreas Johansson − 37:06	3–2
	3–3	39:00 – Ville Peltonen
	3–4	41:31 – Saku Koivu
	3–5	44:35 – Timo Jutila
	3–6	49:49 – Ville Peltonen

26 April	Czech Republic	5–2 (3–0, 0–2, 2–0)	Austria	Stockholm; Attendance: 6,531

26 April	Norway	2–5 (0–1, 0–2, 2–2)	Finland	Stockholm; Attendance: 7,842

Referee:
Frantisek Rejthar

	0–1	04:15 – Mika Strömberg
	0–2	20:35 – Hannu Virta
	0–3	24:58 – Timo Jutila
	0–4	43:18 – Mika Nieminen
Espen Knutsen – 50:14	1–4
Trond Mangnusen – 51:48	2–4
	2–5	54:39 – Saku Koivu

20 min
Penalties
16 min

27 April	Czech Republic	2–4 (0–0, 0–2, 2–2)	United States	Stockholm; Attendance: 7,452

27 April	Austria	0–5 (0–1, 0–1, 0–3)	Sweden	Stockholm

28 April	United States	2–2 (1-2, 0–0, 1–0)	Sweden	Stockholm; Attendance: 13,850

Referee:
Anton Danko

Brett Hauer – 00.40	1–0
	1–1	07.42 – Tommy Sjödin
	1–2	11.15 – Christer Olsson
Pat Neaton – 44.14	2–2

20 min
Penalties
10 min

29 April	Finland	7–2 (4–1, 3–0, 0–1)	Austria	Stockholm; Attendance: 10,438

Ari Sulander
Goalies
Claus Dalpiaz
Referee:
Leonid Vaijsfeld

Sami Kapanen – 00:25	1–0
Raimo Summanen – 01:18	2–0
Sami Kapanen – 04:43	3–0
	3–1	09:56 – Gerald Ressman
Marko Palo – 16:31	4–1
Mika Nieminen – 25:18	5–1
Juha Ylönen – 27.09	6–1
Jere Lehtinen – 35:57	7–1
	7–2	57:47 – Andreas Pusnik

6 min
Penalties
12 min

29 April	Czech Republic	3–1 (1–0, 1–1, 1–0)	Norway	Stockholm; Attendance: 8,864

Referee:
Reto Bertolotti

Pavel Janku – 00:47	1–0
Jiří Vykoukal – 27:25	2–0
	2–1	38:00 – Trond Magnussen
Radek Bělohlav – 55:18	3–1

8 min
Penalties
4 min

30 April	United States	4–4 (1–0, 3–1, 0–3)	Finland	Stockholm; Attendance: 13,850

Pat Jablonski
Goalies
Jarmo Myllys
Referee:
(Canada) Sylvain Bibeau

Tim Bergland – 8:16	1–0
Mike Pomichter – 25:13	2–0
Todd Harkins – 31:06	3–0
	3–1	32:17 – Saku Koivu
Cal McGowan – 37:10	4–1
	4–2	42:55 – Timo Jutila
	4–3	51:02 – Saku Koivu
	4–4	57:44 – Mika Strömberg

14 min
Penalties
8 min

30 April	Sweden	2–1 (0–1, 2–0, 0–0)	Czech Republic	Stockholm; Attendance: 13,850

Thomas Östlund
Goalies
Roman Turek
Referee:
Peter Slapke

	0–1	5.31 – Otakar Vejvoda
Mikael Johansson – 29.04	1–1
Tomas Forslund – 31.37	2–1

12 min
Penalties
16 min

1 May	Norway	5–3 (1–1, 4–2, 0–0)	Austria	Stockholm; Attendance: 7,347

=== Consolation round 11–12 place ===
2 May	Austria	4–0 (1–0, 3–0, 0–0)	Switzerland	Gävle; Attendance: 2,968

Referee:
(Finland) Marko Lepaus

Andreas Pusnik – 17:30	1–0
Dieter Kalt – 20:40	2–0
Andreas Pusnik – 32:56	3–0
Werner Kert – 38:49	4–0

12 min
Penalties
18 min

4 May	Switzerland	4–4 (1–2, 1–1, 2–1)	Austria	Stockholm; Attendance: 7,418

Referee:
(Sweden) Börje Johansson

Andy Ton – 00.28	1–0
	1–1	02.16 – Robin Doyle
	1–2	19.48 – Werner Kerth
	1–3	25.38 – Richard Nasheim
Marcel Jenni – 38.26	2–3
Patrick Howald – 50.27	3–3
	3–4	51.54 – Richard Nasheim
Andreas Zehnder – 56.02	4–4

10 min
Penalties
20 min

Switzerland was relegated to Group B.

=== Playoff round ===
Quarterfinals
3 May
Russia	0
Czech Republic	2
2 May
Finland	5
France	0
2 May
Italy	0
Sweden	7
3 May
United States	1
Canada	4

Semifinals
5 May
Czech Republic	0
Finland	3
5 May
Sweden (OT)	3
Canada	2

Final
7 May
Finland	4
Sweden	1
Third place
6 May
Canada	4
Czech Republic	1

==== Quarterfinals ====
2 May	Italy	0–7 (0–2, 0–3, 0–2)	Sweden	Stockholm; Attendance: 13,850

Mario Brunetta
Goalies
Thomas Östlund

0–1	xx:xx – Tommy Sjödin
0–2	08:33 – Stafan Nilsson
0–3	23:16 – Andreas Dackell
0–4	28:51 – Andreas Dackell
0–5	32:50 – Tomas Forslund
0–6	43:17 – Fredrik Stillman
0–7	47:16 – Stefan Örnskog

36 min
Penalties
12 min

2 May	Finland	5–0 (0–0, 4–0, 1–0)	France	Stockholm; Attendance: 13,118

Jarmo Myllys
Goalies
Petri Ylönen
Referee:
(Germany) Peter Slapke

Timo Jutila – 27:52	1–0
Esa Keskinen – 29:09	2–0
Janne Niinimaa – 29.51	3–0
Tero Lehterä – 38:06	4–0
Jere Lehtinen – 45:02	5–0

14 min
Penalties
16 min

3 May	Russia	0–2 (0–1, 0–0, 0–1)	Czech Republic	Stockholm; Attendance: 11,772

	Referee: Rob Hearn
0–1 / 08:42 – Jiří Kučera; 0–2 / 45:51 – Otakar Vejvoda	Referee: Rob Hearn

3 May	United States	1–4 (0–2, 0–1, 1–1)	Canada	Stockholm; Attendance: 13,850

Pat Jablonski
Goalies
Corey Hirsch

	0–1	14.40 – Dale DeGray
	0–2	15.30 – Jean-François Jomphe
	0–3	37.17 – Todd Hlushko
Paul Stanton – 46.19	1–3
	1–4	53.54 – Ralph Intranuovo

20 min
Penalties
8 min

==== Semifinals ====
5 May	Sweden	3–2 (OT) (0–0, 1–1, 1–1, 1–0)	Canada	Stockholm; Attendance: 13,850

Thomas Östlund
Goalies
Corey Hirsch
Referee:
(Slovakia) Anton Danko

Daniel Alfredsson – 25:04	1–0
	1–1	28:15 – Luciano Borsato
	1–2	46:43 – Jean-François Jomphe
Mikael Johansson – 53:45	2–2
Daniel Alfredsson – 68:17	3–2

2 min
Penalties
12 min

5 May	Czech Republic	0–3 (0–1, 0–0, 0–2)	Finland	Stockholm; Attendance: 12,853

Roman Turek
Goalies
Jarmo Myllys
Referee:
(Canada) Sylvain Bibeau

0–1	19:46 – Raimo Helminen
0–2	52:39 – Ville Peltonen
0–3	57:13 – Mika Nieminen

8 min
Penalties
6 min

==== Match for third place ====
6 May	Canada	4–1 (1–1, 2–0, 1–0)	Czech Republic	Stockholm; Attendance: 12,175

Corey Hirsch
Goalies
Roman Turek
Referee:
Rob Hearn

	0–1	10.55 – Pavel Geffert
Ralph Intranuovo – 14.32	1–1
Iain Fraser – 21.19	2–1
Todd Hlushko – 25.44	3–1
Jean-François Jomphe – 53.38	4–1

==== Final ====
Time is local (UTC+2).

7 May; 15:00	Finland	4–1 (1–0, 2–0, 1–1)	Sweden	Stockholm; Attendance: 13,850

Jarmo Myllys
Goalies
Thomas Östlund
Referee:
(Canada) Sylvain Bibeau
Linesmen:
(Czech Republic) Vaclav Cesky
(Germany) Michael Langer

(Niinimaa) Ville Peltonen – 08:07	1–0
(Lehtinen) Ville Peltonen – 37:39	2–0
(Koivu, Strömberg) Ville Peltonen – 39.56	3–0
(Peltonen, Koivu) Timo Jutila – 42.52	4–0
	4–1	43:58 – Jonas Bergqvist (Stillman, Sjödin)

18 min
Penalties
8 min

== World Championship Group B (Slovakia) ==
Played in Bratislava, 12–21 April. The hosts bettered their Group C record of the previous year, this time winning all their games. Thirty-eight-year-old Peter Stastny led the tournament in scoring.

Pos	Team	Pld	W	D	L	GF	GA	GD	Pts
13	Slovakia	7	7	0	0	60	15	+45	14
14	Latvia	7	6	0	1	65	16	+49	12
15	Poland	7	4	0	3	29	30	−1	8
16	Netherlands	7	3	0	4	20	38	−18	6
17	Denmark	7	3	0	4	30	28	+2	6
18	Japan	7	2	0	5	26	45	−19	4
19	Great Britain	7	2	0	5	19	35	−16	4
20	Romania	7	1	0	6	15	57	−42	2

Slovakia was promoted to Group A while Romania was relegated to Group C.

12 April	Latvia	18–1	Romania

12 April	Slovakia	7–3	Great Britain

12 April	Poland	8–1	Netherlands

12 April	Japan	1–5	Denmark

13 April	Romania	2–0	Great Britain

13 April	Slovakia	9–3	Japan

13 April	Netherlands	1–6	Latvia

13 April	Denmark	1–3	Poland

15 April	Great Britain	3–2	Netherlands

15 April	Japan	8–2	Romania

15 April	Slovakia	10–0	Poland

15 April	Latvia	9–2	Denmark

16 April	Romania	3–6	Poland

16 April	Netherlands	4–3	Japan

16 April	Slovakia	4–3	Latvia

16 April	Denmark	9–2	Great Britain

18 April	Latvia	6–2	Poland

18 April	Netherlands	5–3	Romania

18 April	Slovakia	6–2	Denmark

18 April	Great Britain	3–4	Japan

19 April	Romania	4–9	Denmark

19 April	Japan	2–15	Latvia

19 April	Slovakia	13–4	Netherlands

19 April	Poland	3–4	Great Britain

21 April	Denmark	2–3	Netherlands

21 April	Poland	7–5	Japan

21 April	Great Britain	4–8	Latvia

21 April	Slovakia	11–0	Romania

== World Championship Group C1 (Bulgaria) ==
Played in Sofia 20–26 March. Nine teams took part this year because Yugoslavia was given the right to return to the group that they had last played in as the Socialist Federal Republic of Yugoslavia. The consequence was that two teams were relegated. They played in three groups of three where the first place teams contested promotion and the third place teams contested relegation. Two years after failing to qualify for Group C, Belarus got a rematch against Ukraine and Kazakhstan, this time coming out on top.

=== Group 1 ===
Pos	Team	Pld	W	D	L	GF	GA	GD	Pts
1	Kazakhstan	2	2	0	0	20	1	+19	4
2	China	2	1	0	1	4	14	−10	2
3	Bulgaria	2	0	0	2	3	12	−9	0

20 March	Bulgaria	2–4	China

21 March	China	0–12	Kazakhstan

22 March	Bulgaria	1–8	Kazakhstan

=== Group 2 ===
Pos	Team	Pld	W	D	L	GF	GA	GD	Pts
1	Belarus	2	2	0	0	11	5	+6	4
2	Estonia	2	1	0	1	7	9	−2	2
3	Slovenia	2	0	0	2	7	11	−4	0

20 March	Estonia	1–6	Belarus

21 March	Belarus	5–4	Slovenia

22 March	Slovenia	3–6	Estonia

=== Group 3 ===
Pos	Team	Pld	W	D	L	GF	GA	GD	Pts
1	Ukraine	2	2	0	0	24	4	+20	4
2	Hungary	2	1	0	1	10	10	0	2
3	Yugoslavia	2	0	0	2	4	24	−20	0

20 March	Yugoslavia	3–15	Ukraine

21 March	Ukraine	9–1	Hungary

22 March	Hungary	9–1	Yugoslavia

=== Final round 21–23 place ===
Pos	Team	Pld	W	D	L	GF	GA	GD	Pts
21	Belarus	2	2	0	0	5	2	+3	4
22	Kazakhstan	2	0	1	1	3	4	−1	1
23	Ukraine	2	0	1	1	3	5	−2	1

Belarus was promoted to Group B.

24 March	Ukraine	2–2	Kazakhstan

25 March	Belarus	3–1	Ukraine

26 March	Kazakhstan	1–2	Belarus

=== Consolation round 24–26 place ===
Pos	Team	Pld	W	D	L	GF	GA	GD	Pts
24	Estonia	2	2	0	0	15	7	+8	4
25	China	2	1	0	1	9	12	−3	2
26	Hungary	2	0	0	2	5	10	−5	0

24 March	Hungary	3–4	China

25 March	Estonia	6–2	Hungary

26 March	China	5–9	Estonia

=== Consolation round 27–29 place ===
Pos	Team	Pld	W	D	L	GF	GA	GD	Pts
27	Slovenia	2	2	0	0	21	4	+17	4
28	Yugoslavia	2	1	0	1	9	7	+2	2
29	Bulgaria	2	0	0	2	1	20	−19	0

Both Yugoslavia and Bulgaria were relegated to group C2.

24 March	Yugoslavia	6–0	Bulgaria

25 March	Slovenia	7–3	Yugoslavia

26 March	Bulgaria	1–14	Slovenia

== World Championship Group C2 (South Africa) ==
Played in Johannesburg and Krugersdorp in South Africa from 21 to 30 March. Two groups of five played round robins where the top two from each contested promotion. The bottom five teams were relegated to qualification tournaments for 1996 Group D. Belgian player Joris Peusens was only fifteen years old.

=== Group 1 ===
Pos	Team	Pld	W	D	L	GF	GA	GD	Pts
1	Lithuania	4	4	0	0	40	8	+32	8
2	Spain	4	3	0	1	32	8	+24	6
3	Belgium	4	1	1	2	18	19	−1	3
4	Australia	4	1	0	3	16	24	−8	2
5	Greece	4	0	1	3	9	56	−47	1

Greece was relegated to Group D qualification.

21 March	Belgium	5–5	Greece

21 March	Spain	3–4	Lithuania

22 March	Greece	1–21	Spain

22 March	Belgium	10–2	Australia

24 March	Lithuania	8–2	Belgium

24 March	Greece	2–10	Australia

26 March	Lithuania	20–1	Greece

26 March	Australia	2–4	Spain

27 March	Australia	2–8	Lithuania

27 March	Spain	4–1	Belgium

=== Group 2 ===
Pos	Team	Pld	W	D	L	GF	GA	GD	Pts
1	Croatia	4	4	0	0	41	11	+30	8
2	South Korea	4	3	0	1	37	7	+30	6
3	Israel	4	2	0	2	23	15	+8	4
4	South Africa	4	1	0	3	7	29	−22	2
5	New Zealand	4	0	0	4	7	53	−46	0

New Zealand was relegated to Group D qualification.

21 March	Croatia	19–5	New Zealand

21 March	South Africa	2–8	South Korea

22 March	Croatia	7–2	Israel

22 March	New Zealand	0–13	South Korea

24 March	New Zealand	0–12	Israel

24 March	South Africa	1–11	Croatia

26 March	South Korea	7–1	Israel

26 March	South Africa	3–2	New Zealand

27 March	South Korea	3–4	Croatia

27 March	South Africa	1–8	Israel

=== Final round 30–33 place ===
Pos	Team	Pld	W	D	L	GF	GA	GD	Pts
30	Croatia	3	2	1	0	13	9	+4	5
31	Lithuania	3	2	1	0	12	8	+4	5
32	Spain	3	1	0	2	13	15	−2	2
33	South Korea	3	0	0	3	10	16	−6	0

Croatia only needed to tie Lithuania in their final game to earn promotion to Group C1, and they did so.

29 March	Lithuania	5–2	South Korea

29 March	Croatia	6–3	Spain

30 March	Spain	7–5	South Korea

30 March	Lithuania	3–3	Croatia

=== Consolation round 34–37 place ===
Pos	Team	Pld	W	D	L	GF	GA	GD	Pts
34	Belgium	3	2	0	1	22	10	+12	4
35	Israel	3	2	0	1	16	8	+8	4
36	Australia	3	2	0	1	17	17	0	4
37	South Africa	3	0	0	3	8	28	−20	0

Israel, Australia, and South Africa, all were relegated to Group D qualification.

29 March	South Africa	1–10	Belgium

29 March	Australia	5–1	Israel

30 March	South Africa	6–10	Australia

30 March	Belgium	2–7	Israel

=== Consolation round 38–39 place ===
Pos	Team	Pld	W	D	L	GF	GA	GD	Pts
38	Greece	1	1	0	0	10	7	+3	2
39	New Zealand	1	0	0	1	7	10	−3	0

30 March	Greece	10–7	New Zealand

== Ranking and statistics ==
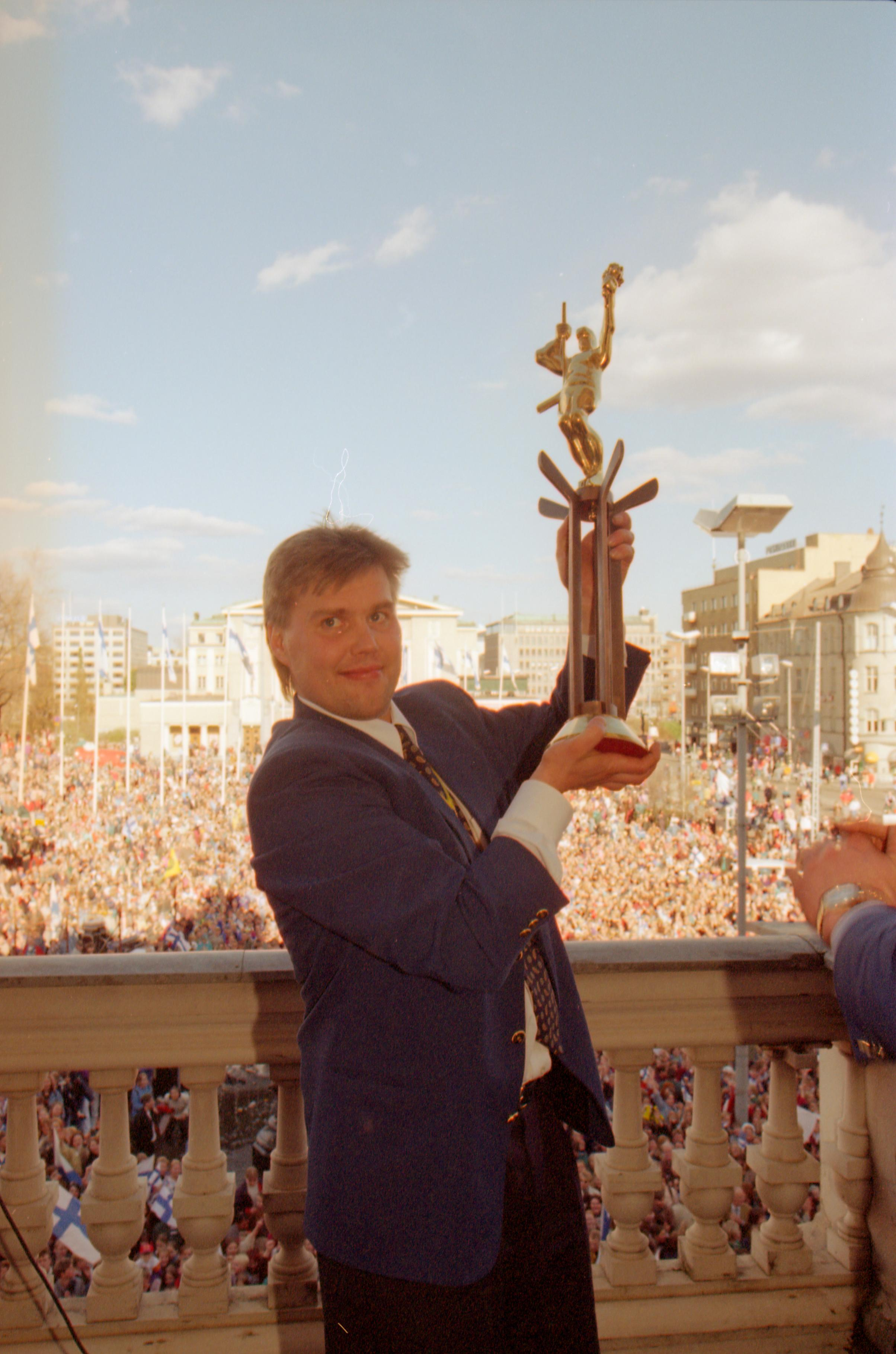
Timo Jutila with the World Championship trophy in 1995

1995 IIHF World Championship winners

Finland
1st title

=== Tournament Awards ===
- Best players selected by the directorate:
  - Best Goaltender: (Finland) Jarmo Myllys
  - Best Defenceman: (Sweden) Christer Olsson
  - Best Forward: (Finland) Saku Koivu
- Media All-Star Team:
  - Goaltender: (Czech Republic) Roman Turek
  - Defence: (Finland) Timo Jutila, (Sweden) Tommy Sjodin
  - Forwards: (Finland) Saku Koivu, (Finland) Jere Lehtinen, (Finland) Ville Peltonen

=== Final standings ===
The final standings of the tournament according to IIHF:

1st place, gold medalist(s)	Finland
2nd place, silver medalist(s)	Sweden
3rd place, bronze medalist(s)	Canada
4	Czech Republic
5	Russia
6	United States
7	Italy
8	France
9	Germany
10	Norway
11	Austria
12	Switzerland

=== Scoring leaders ===
List shows the top skaters sorted by points, then goals.

Player	GP	G	A	Pts	+/−	PIM	POS
(Canada) Andrew McKim	8	6	7	13	+1	4	F
(Finland) Ville Peltonen	8	6	5	11	+12	4	F
(Finland) Saku Koivu	8	5	5	10	+9	18	F
(Sweden) Andreas Johansson	8	3	6	9	+6	8	F
(Sweden) Mikael Johansson	8	3	6	9	+7	4	F
(Canada) Iain Fraser	8	2	7	9	+4	8	F
(Russia) Sergei Berezin	6	7	1	8	+5	4	F
(United States) Jon Morris	6	3	5	8	+10	4	F
(France) Christian Pouget	6	2	6	8	+5	4	F
(Finland) Raimo Helminen	8	1	7	8	+11	2	F

=== Leading goaltenders ===
Only the top five goaltenders, based on save percentage, who have played 50% of their team's minutes are included in this list.

Player	MIP	GA	GAA	SVS%	SO
(Czech Republic) Roman Turek	359	9	1.50	.939	2
(United States) Pat Jablonski	360	15	2.50	.923	0
(Russia) Alexei Cherviakov	180	5	1.67	.923	1
(France) Petri Ylönen	300	11	2.20	.921	1
(Finland) Jarmo Myllys	420	12	1.71	.917	3

== See also ==
- 1995 World Junior Ice Hockey Championships
