= 1996 Sweden Hockey Games =

Ice hockey competition in Stockholm

Tournament details
- Host country: Sweden
- City: Stockholm
- Venue: 1 (in 1 host city)
- Dates: 8 – 11 February 1996
- Teams: 4

Final positions
- Champions: Sweden (3rd title)
- Runners-up: Czech Republic
- Third place: Russia
- Fourth place: Canada

Tournament statistics
- Games played: 6
- Goals scored: 40 (6.67 per game)
- Attendance: 43,865 (7,311 per game)
- Scoring leader: (Czech Republic) Jiří Vykoukal (5 points)

The 1996 Sweden Hockey Games was played between 8 and 12 February 1996 in Stockholm, Sweden. The Czech Republic, Sweden, Russia and Canada played a round-robin for a total of three games per team and six games in total. All of the games were played in the Globen in Stockholm, Sweden. The tournament was won by Sweden.

== Standings ==
Pos	Team	Pld	W	D	L	GF	GA	GD	Pts
1	Sweden	3	3	0	0	12	3	+9	9
2	Czech Republic	3	2	0	1	14	6	+8	6
3	Russia	3	1	0	2	9	11	−2	3
4	Canada	3	0	0	3	5	20	−15	0

Source: swehockey

== Games ==
All times are local. Stockholm – (Central European Time – UTC+1)

8 February 1996	Czech Republic	6–2 (2–1, 2–0, 2–1)	Russia	Globen, Stockholm; Attendance: 1,113

Game reference

Petr Briza
Goalies
Alexei Tikhomirov
Referee:
(Sweden) Robert Lathi

	0-1	06:44 – Denis Afinogenov
09:21 – Pavel Patera (Otakar Vejvoda)	1-1
19:52 – Otakar Vejvoda (Radek Bělohlav)	2-1
24:32 – Robert Kysela (Drahomír Kadlec) (PP)	3-1
39:48 – Otakar Vejvoda (Antonín Stavjaňa, Robert Kysela) (PP)	4-1
41:11 – Jiří Kučera (Jiří Vykoukal, Bedřich Ščerban) (PP)	5-1
56:14 – František Kaberle (Jiří Kučera)	6-1
	6-2	58:09 – Sergei Fokin (Andrei Potaichuk)

10 min
Penalties
5 min
24
Shots
19

8 February 1996	Sweden	7–1 (3–1, 3–0, 1–0)	Canada	Globen, Stockholm; Attendance: 13,850

Game reference

Boo Ahl
Goalies

Referee:
(Czech Republic) Frantisek Rejthar

01:08 – Per Svartvadet	1-0
05:10 – Mattias Johansson (Tomas Holmström, Roger Åkerström) (PP)	2-0
	2-1	14:12 – Jim Hiller
16:44 – Fredrik Öberg (Mattias Öhlund, Niklas Eriksson) (PP)	3-1
28:26 – Tomas Holmström (Jonas Bergqvist) (PP)	4-1
38:27 – Mattias Johansson (Roger Johansson)	5-1
39:59 – Fredrik Modin (Andreas Dackell, Tomas Jonsson) (PP)	6-1
53:49 – Tomas Forslund (Roger Åkerström, Mattias Johansson)	7-1

4 min
Penalties
18 min
51
Shots
21

9 February 1996	Russia	0–2 (0–0, 0–1, 0–1)	Sweden	Globen, Stockholm; Attendance: 10,183

Game reference
Alexei Tikhomirov	Goalies	Boo Ahl	Referee: (Czech Republic)
0-1 / 37:25 – Per Svartvadet (Kenneth Kennholt, Hans Jonsson) (PP); 0-2 / 44:25 – Thomas Holmström (Jan Larsson)			Referee: (Czech Republic)
10 min	Penalties	4 min	Referee: (Czech Republic)
13	Shots	34	Referee: (Czech Republic)

9 February 1996	Canada	1–6 (0–1, 0–3, 1–2)	Czech Republic	Globen, Stockholm; Attendance: 3,821

Game reference

Goalies
Petr Briza
Referee:
(Finland) Marko Lepaus

	0-1	19:57 – Antonín Stavjaňa (Robert Reichel, Radek Bělohlav)
	0-2	29:18 – Robert Kysela (PP)
	0-3	32:54 – Robert Reichel (Radek Bělohlav)
	0-4	35:03 – Libor Zábranský (Viktor Ujčík, Jan Alinč)
	0-5	52:35 – Robert Reichel (Jan Alinč)
55:09 – Bryan Muir (Dany Bosquet)	1-5
	1-6	56:56 – Robert Reichel (Radek Bělohlav)

16 min
Penalties
8 min
17
Shots
27

11 February 1996	Russia	7–3 (3–0, 0–1, 4–2)	Canada	Globen, Stockholm; Attendance: 4,227

Game reference

Alexei Tikhomirov
Goalies

Referee:
(Sweden) Roger Öberg

06:24 – Sergei Berezin	1-0
10:43 – Sergei Berezin	2-0
18:41 – Sergei Sorokin (Alex Galchenyuk)	3-0
	3-1	36:24 – Jeff McLeod
43:14 – Denis Afinogenov (Vadim Epanchintsev, Sergei Sorokin)	4-1
45:26 – Igor Alexandrov (Alex Galchenyuk)	5-1
46:35 – Denis Afinogenov (Sergei Fokin)	6-1
	6-2	51:46 – Terran Sandwith (Dany Bosquet)
55:26 – Sergei Berezin (Igor Alexandrov, Alexei Kudashov)	7-2
	7-3	57:45 – Ryan Johnson (Mike Bodnarchuk)

18 min
Penalties
24 min
26
Shots
22

11 February 1996	Sweden	3-2 (0–1, 0–1, 3–0)	Czech Republic	Globen, Stockholm; Attendance: 10,671

Game reference

Boo Ahl
Goalies
Petr Briza
Referee:
(Czech Republic)

	0-1	00:21 – Jiri Kuceras
	0-2	39:50 – Martin Prochazka
46:28 – Jonas Bergqvist (Niklas Eriksson)	1-2
47:54 – Janne Larsson (Kenneth Kennholt)	2-2
59:50 – Andreas Dackell	3-2

41
Shots
19

== Scoring leaders ==
Pos	Player	Country	GP	G	A	Pts	PIM	POS
1	Jiří Vykoukal	Czech Republic	3	0	5	5	4	D
2	Robert Reichel	Czech Republic	3	3	1	5	2	F
3	Radek Bělohlav	Russia	3	1	3	4	2	F
4	Sergei Berezin	Russia	3	3	0	3	0	F
5	Denis Afinogenov	Russia	3	3	0	3	0	F

GP = Games played; G = Goals; A = Assists; Pts = Points; +/− = Plus/minus; PIM = Penalties in minutes; POS = Position
Source: quanthockey

== Tournament awards ==
The tournament directorate named the following players in the tournament 1997l6:

- Best goalkeeper: (Czech Republic) Petr Bříza
- Best defenceman: (Sweden) Tommy Sjödin
- Best forward: (Russia) Sergei Berezin

Media All-Star Team:

- Goaltender: (Czech Republic) Petr Bříza
- Defence: (Sweden) Roger Johansson, (Czech Republic) Drahomír Kadlec
- Forwards: (Russia) Sergei Berezin, (Czech Republic) Robert Reichel, (Sweden) Tomas Forslund
