= 1996 Karjala Tournament =

Tournament details
- Host country: Finland
- City: Helsinki
- Venue: 1 (in 1 host city)
- Dates: 6–9 November 1996
- Teams: 4

Final positions
- Champions: Finland (1st title)
- Runners-up: Sweden
- Third place: Russia
- Fourth place: Czech Republic

Tournament statistics
- Games played: 6
- Scoring leader: (Sweden) Michael Nylander (6 points)

The 1996 Karjala Tournament was played between 7 and 10 November 1996. The Czech Republic, Finland, Sweden and Russia played a round-robin for a total of three games per team and six games in total. All of the games were played in Hartwall Areena, Helsinki, Finland. Sweden won the tournament. The tournament was part of the 1996–97 Euro Hockey Tour.

== Standings ==
Pos	Team	Pld	W	D	L	GF	GA	GD	Pts
1	Finland	3	2	1	0	15	6	+9	5
2	Sweden	3	2	0	1	9	8	+1	4
3	Russia	3	1	0	2	5	11	−6	2
4	Czech Republic	3	0	1	2	5	9	−4	1

Source: hokej

== Games ==
All times are local. Helsinki – (Eastern European Time – UTC+2)

7 November 1996; 17:00	Czech Republic	1-3 (1-2, 0-1, 0-0)	Sweden	Hartwall Areena, Helsinki

Game reference

Roman Čechmánek
Goalies
Mikael Sandberg

	0-1	09:14 – Kjellberg (Nylander)
Alinč (Vůjtek, Bělohlav) – 15:07	1-1
	1-2	16:58 – Hävelid (Svartvadet, Eklund)
	1-3	36:22 – Falk (Åkerström)

14 min
Penalties
4 min

7 November 1996; 18:00	Finland	6-1 (1-1, 4-0, 1-0)	Russia	Hartwall Areena, Helsinki

Game reference

Ari Sulander
Goalies
Alexei Yegorov

Nieminen – 15:00	1-0
	1-1	19:00 – Korolyuk
Varvio – 26:00	2-1
Nieminen – 37:00	3-1
Riihijärvi – 37:00	4-1
Riihijärvi – 40:00	5-1
Ojanen – 60:00	6-1

9 November 1996; 15:00	Sweden	4-1 (1-0, 1-1, 2-0)	Russia	Hartwall Areena, Helsinki

Game reference

Mikael Sandberg
Goalies
Alexei Yegorov

Svartvadet – 20:00	1-0
Bremberg – 30:00	2-0
	2-1	37:00 – Fedotov
Magnus Svensson – 45:00	3-1
Kjellberg – 56:00	4-1

9 November 1996; 18:30	Finland	3-3 (1-1, 0-1, 2-1)	Czech Republic	Hartwall Areena, Helsinki

Game reference

Jani Hurme
Goalies
Martin Prusek

	0-1	09:45 – Vůjtek
Kiprusoff (Koivisto, Aalto) – 15:22	1-1
	1-2	35:40 – Šimíček (Bednář)
	1-3	57:54 – Alinč (Vůjtek)
Rintanen (Strömberg) – 55:39	2-3
Jutila (Ojanen, Nieminen) – 59:41	3-3

6 min
Penalties
10 min

10 November 1996; 15:00	Czech Republic	1-3 (1-0, 0-1, 0-2)	Russia	Hartwall Areena, Helsinki

Game reference

Martin Prusek
Goalies
Vladimir Tikhomirov

Vlasák (Vůjtek, Alinč) – 11:31	1-0
	1-1	37:34 – Korolyuk (Afinogenov)
	1-2	57:34 – Gogolev (Fedotov)
	1-3	59:55 – Afinogenov (Fedotov)

8 min
Penalties
8 min

10 November 1996; 18:30	Finland	6-2 (0-0, 4-2, 2-0)	Sweden	Hartwall Areena, Helsinki

Game reference

Jani Hurme
Goalies
Johan Hedberg

Varis – 23:00	1-0
Timonen – 25:00	2-0
Jääskeläinen – 30:00	3-0
Varvio – 34:00	4-0
	4-1	35:00 – Eklund
	4-2	36:00 – Nylander
Lind – 47:00	5-2
Aalto – 57:00	6-2

== Scoring leaders ==
Pos	Player	Country	GP	G	A	Pts	+/−	PIM	POS
1	Michael Nylander	Sweden	3	1	5	6	0	2	F
2	Patric Kjellberg	Sweden	3	2	2	4	0	0	F
3	Jarkko Varvio	Finland	3	2	2	4	+3	0	F
4	Mika Nieminen	Finland	3	2	2	4	+2	0	F
5	Vladimír Vůjtek	Czech Republic	3	1	3	4	+3	2	F

GP = Games played; G = Goals; A = Assists; Pts = Points; +/− = Plus/minus; PIM = Penalties in minutes; POS = Position
Source: quanthockey

== Tournament awards ==
The tournament directorate named the following players in the 1996 tournament:

- Best goalkeeper: (Russia) Alexei Yegorov
- Best defenceman: (Sweden) Magnus Svensson
- Best forward: (Finland) Mika Nieminen

Media All-Star Team A:

- Goaltender: (Finland) Jani Hurme
- Defence: (Sweden) Magnus Svensson, (Finland) Timo Jutila
- Forwards: (Sweden) Patric Kjellberg, (Finland) Mika Nieminen, (Finland) Juha Riihijarvi

Media All-Star Team B:

- Goaltender: (Sweden) Mikael Sandberg
- Defence: (Finland) Marko Kiprusoff, (Sweden) Roger Johansson
- Forwards: (Czech Republic) Vladimír Vůjtek, (Sweden) Michael Nylander, (Russia) Alexander Korolyuk
