= Figliuzzi =

Figliuzzi is an Italian surname. Notable people with the surname include:

- Frank Figliuzzi (born 1962), American intelligence agent and government executive
- Stephan Figliuzzi (born 1968), Italian ice hockey player
