= Andrew McKim =

Canadian former ice hockey centre (born 1970)

- Born: July 6, 1970 (age 54); Saint John, New Brunswick, Canada
- Height: 5 ft 8 in (173 cm)
- Weight: 175 lb (79 kg; 12 st 7 lb)
- Position: Centre
- Shot: Right
- Played for: Boston Bruins; Detroit Red Wings
- National team: Canada
- NHL draft: Undrafted
- Playing career: 1990–2001

Medal record

Representing Canada

World Championships
Bronze medal – third place	1995 Stockholm	

Andrew Harry McKim (born July 6, 1970) is a Canadian former ice hockey centre. He played in the National Hockey League for the Boston Bruins and the Detroit Red Wings, playing a total of 38 regular season games.

== Career ==
McKim's lone NHL goal occurred when he was playing for Boston. It came in the Bruins' 9-4 victory over the Hartford Whalers on December 26, 1992. He won the scoring title at the 1995 Men's World Ice Hockey Championships and won the bronze medal with Team Canada.

McKim spent three seasons in Germany's Deutsche Eishockey Liga for the Eisbären Berlin and two seasons in Switzerland's Nationalliga A for the Kloten Flyers and the ZSC Lions before retiring in 2001. He is now the technical director of Paradise Minor Hockey Blades And coach of the junior warriors in Newfoundland and Labrador. He also runs and helps coach the Xtreme Hockey School in the same province.

== Personal life ==
McKim lives in St. John's, Newfoundland and Labrador, with his wife Anne McKim and four children.

== Career statistics ==
=== Regular season and playoffs ===
			Regular season					Playoffs
Season	Team	League	GP	G	A	Pts	PIM	GP	G	A	Pts	PIM
1986–87	Verdun Jr. Canadiens	QMJHL	70	28	59	87	12	—	—	—	—	—
1987–88	Verdun Jr. Canadiens	QMJHL	62	27	32	59	27	—	—	—	—	—
1988–89	Verdun Jr. Canadiens	QMJHL	68	50	56	106	36	—	—	—	—	—
1989–90	Hull Olympiques	QMJHL	70	66	64	130	44	11	8	10	18	8
1990–91	Salt Lake Golden Eagles	IHL	74	30	30	60	48	4	0	2	2	6
1991–92	St. John's Maple Leafs	AHL	79	43	50	93	79	16	11	12	23	4
1992–93	Boston Bruins	NHL	7	1	3	4	0	—	—	—	—	—
1992–93	Providence Bruins	AHL	61	23	46	69	64	6	2	2	4	0
1993–94	Boston Bruins	NHL	29	0	1	1	4	—	—	—	—	—
1993–94	Providence Bruins	AHL	46	13	24	37	49	—	—	—	—	—
1994–95	Detroit Red Wings	NHL	2	0	0	0	2	—	—	—	—	—
1994–95	Adirondack Red Wings	AHL	77	39	55	94	22	4	3	3	6	0
1995–96	Genève-Servette HC	CHE II	36	20	25	45	14	3	0	2	2	4
1995–96	Canada	Intl	10	7	7	14	6	—	—	—	—	—
1996–97	Eisbären Berlin	DEL	47	23	21	44	12	8	3	7	10	29
1997–98	Eisbären Berlin	DEL	49	17	30	47	10	10	6	5	11	6
1998–99	Eisbären Berlin	DEL	42	19	18	37	22	7	1	1	2	43
1999–2000	EHC Kloten	NLA	44	25	20	45	20	7	3	3	6	12
1999–2000	Canada	Intl	4	0	1	1	17	—	—	—	—	—
2000–01	ZSC Lions	NLA	18	4	5	9	6	—	—	—	—	—
AHL totals			263	118	175	293	214	26	16	17	33	4
NHL totals			38	1	4	5	6	—	—	—	—	—
DEL totals			138	59	69	128	44	25	10	13	23	78

=== International ===
Year	Team	Event	GP	G	A	Pts	PIM
1995	Canada	WC	8	6	7	13	4
