= Jayson Meyer =

German ice hockey player

- Born: 21 February 1965 (age 60); Regina, Saskatchewan, Canada
- Height: 5 ft 10 in (178 cm)
- Weight: 187 lb (85 kg; 13 st 5 lb)
- Position: Defence
- Shot: Left
- Played for: Rochester Americans; Flint Spirits; Krefeld Pinguine; Kölner Haie
- National team: Germany
- NHL draft: 94th overall, 1983; Buffalo Sabres
- Playing career: 1985–2006

Jayson Meyer (born 21 February 1965) is a German-Canadian ice hockey player. He competed for Germany in the men's tournament at the 1994 Winter Olympics.

== Career statistics ==
=== Regular season and playoffs ===
			Regular season					Playoffs
Season	Team	League	GP	G	A	Pts	PIM	GP	G	A	Pts	PIM
1981–82	Regina Pats	WHL	59	3	20	23	106	20	2	9	11	20
1982–83	Regina Pats	WHL	72	10	45	55	89	5	0	6	6	4
1983–84	Regina Pats	WHL	70	16	67	83	39	6	1	3	4	10
1984–85	New Westminster Bruins	WHL	63	20	51	71	67	11	3	9	12	11
1985–86	Rochester Americans	AHL	76	7	28	35	74	6	1	3	4	10
1986–87	Rochester Americans	AHL	3	0	2	2	12	18	2	8	10	14
1986–87	Flint Spirits	IHL	73	17	51	68	77	—	—	—	—	—
1986–87	Rochester Americans	AHL	3	0	2	2	12	18	2	8	10	14
1987–88	EC Kassel	FRG.2	36	21	34	55	57	16	13	11	24	20
1988–89	EHC Essen-West	FRG.2	33	17	35	52	51	17	6	1	7	16
1989–90	EV Landsberg	FRG.2	22	11	27	38	38	18	9	13	22	16
1989–90	EHC Uzwil	SUI.2	9	2	4	6	12	—	—	—	—	—
1990–91	Krefelder EV 1981	GER.2	27	19	25	44	39	17	9	23	32	22
1991–92	Krefelder EV 1981	1.GBun	43	8	27	35	38	4	0	0	0	4
1992–93	Krefelder EV 1981	1.GBun	43	8	24	32	29	4	2	3	5	4
1993–94	Krefelder EV 1981	1.GBun	44	8	23	31	28	6	1	2	3	4
1994–95	Krefelder EV 1981	DEL	43	2	28	30	36	15	3	12	15	14
1995–96	Kölner Haie	DEL	48	10	33	43	43	14	2	4	6	8
1996–97	Kölner Haie	DEL	35	4	11	15	87	—	—	—	—	—
1996–97	Krefeld Pinguine	DEL	14	4	10	14	6	3	0	1	1	4
1997–98	Krefeld Pinguine	DEL	34	3	8	11	20	7	1	4	5	4
1998–99	Krefeld Pinguine	DEL	32	3	11	14	38	3	0	1	1	0
1999–2000	Hamburg Crocodiles	GER.2	44	4	28	32	52	—	—	—	—	—
2000–01	SC Bietigheim-Bissingen	GER.2	43	8	18	26	87	1	0	0	0	0
2001–02	SC Bietigheim-Bissingen	GER.2	47	14	32	46	58	8	1	1	2	8
2002–03	SC Riessersee	GER.2	52	8	24	32	66	11	3	4	7	10
2003–04	SC Riessersee	GER.2	20	6	11	17	42	—	—	—	—	—
2003–04	EC Bad Nauheim	GER.2	14	6	5	11	22	10	2	0	2	22
2005–06	EV Landsberg 2000	GER.3	18	4	12	16	36	8	2	5	7	30
2010–11	EC Kassel Huskies	GER.5	1	0	1	1	0	—	—	—	—	—
FRG.2/GER.2 totals			338	114	239	353	512	98	43	53	96	114
1.GBun totals			130	24	74	98	95	14	3	5	8	12
DEL totals			206	26	101	127	230	42	6	22	28	30

=== International ===
Year	Team	Event	GP	G	A	Pts	PIM
1993	Germany	WC	6	0	0	0	2
1994	Germany	OG	8	0	1	1	8
1994	Germany	WC	5	1	0	1	6
1995	Germany	WC	5	1	0	1	4
1996	Germany	WC	6	0	0	0	4
1996	Germany	WCH	4	0	1	1	2
Senior totals			34	2	2	4	26

"Jayson Meyer". Elite Prospects.
