= Sergei Shendelev =

Russian ice hockey player (born 1964)

- Born: January 19, 1964 (age 62) Leningrad, Soviet Union
- Height: 6 ft 2 in (188 cm)
- Weight: 209 lb (95 kg; 14 st 13 lb)
- Position: Defence
- Shot: Left
- Played for: SKA Leningrad; Starbulls Rosenheim; Frankfurt Lions; Straubing Tigers
- National team: Russia
- Playing career: 1981–2004

Sergei Viktorovich Shendelev (Russian: Сеҏгеӣ викторович Шенделев; born January 19, 1964) is a retired ice hockey player who played in the Soviet Hockey League. He played for Traktor Chelyabinsk and SKA St. Petersburg. He was inducted into the Russian and Soviet Hockey Hall of Fame in 1993.

== Career statistics ==
=== Regular season and playoffs ===
			Regular season					Playoffs
Season	Team	League	GP	G	A	Pts	PIM	GP	G	A	Pts	PIM
1980–81	VIFK Leningrad	URS.3	1	0	0	0	0	—	—	—	—	—
1981–82	VIFK Leningrad	URS.3	25	1	1	2	24	—	—	—	—	—
1981–82	SKA Leningrad	URS	4	0	0	0	6	—	—	—	—	—
1982–83	SKA Leningrad	URS	40	2	2	4	25	—	—	—	—	—
1983–84	SKA Leningrad	URS	44	3	1	4	34	—	—	—	—	—
1984–85	SKA Leningrad	URS	49	1	3	4	38	—	—	—	—	—
1985–86	SKA Leningrad	URS	34	0	2	2	14	—	—	—	—	—
1986–87	SKA Leningrad	URS	34	5	7	12	22	—	—	—	—	—
1987–88	SKA Leningrad	URS	34	4	1	5	37	—	—	—	—	—
1988–89	SKA Leningrad	URS	42	4	1	5	30	—	—	—	—	—
1989–90	SKA Leningrad	URS	26	1	8	9	20	—	—	—	—	—
1990–91	SKA Leningrad	URS	26	0	4	4	42	—	—	—	—	—
1991–92	SKA St. Petersburg	CIS.2	11	0	2	2	14	—	—	—	—	—
1991–92	Maine Mariners	AHL	24	0	2	2	10	—	—	—	—	—
1991–92	New Haven Nighthawks	AHL	7	0	0	0	10	—	—	—	—	—
1992–93	SKA St. Petersburg	IHL	32	4	5	9	14	6	1	3	4	6
1992–93	SKA–2 St. Petersburg	RUS.2	1	0	0	0	2	—	—	—	—	—
1993–94	EC Hedos München	1.GBun	44	8	21	29	22	10	3	3	6	6
1994–95	Mad Dogs München	DEL	26	6	16	22	63	—	—	—	—	—
1994–95	Star Bulls Rosenheim GmbH	DEL	15	4	7	11	8	7	2	6	8	18
1995–96	Frankfurt Lions	DEL	24	8	12	20	6	—	—	—	—	—
1996–97	Frankfurt Lions	DEL	20	4	5	9	16	9	2	3	5	6
1997–98	Kaufbeurer Adler	DEL	15	1	6	7	12	—	—	—	—	—
1997–98	Star Bulls Rosenheim GmbH	DEL	4	0	1	1	10	—	—	—	—	—
1997–98	SC Bietigheim-Bissingen	GER.2	20	8	22	30	44	7	1	5	6	4
1998–99	EV Landsberg	GER.3	43	14	35	49	40	12	2	11	13	12
1999–2000	EHC Straubing	GER.3	62	10	50	60	40	—	—	—	—	—
2000–01	EHC Straubing	GER.2	44	6	15	21	12	—	—	—	—	—
2001–02	EHC Straubing	GER.2	48	6	13	19	32	—	—	—	—	—
2002–03	Eisbären Regensburg	GER.2	56	5	13	18	50	—	—	—	—	—
2003–04	Eisbären Regensburg	GER.2	47	0	4	4	16	5	0	1	1	0
URS totals			333	20	29	49	258	—	—	—	—	—
DEL totals			104	23	47	70	115	16	4	9	13	24
GER.2 totals			215	25	67	92	154	12	1	6	7	4

=== International ===
Year	Team	Event	Result	GP	G	A	Pts	PIM
1984	Soviet Union	WJC	1st place, gold medalist(s)	7	1	0	1	2
1993	Russia	WC	1st place, gold medalist(s)	8	1	3	4	7
1994	Russia	OG	4th	8	0	0	0	6
1994	Russia	WC	5th	6	1	1	2	8
1995	Russia	WC	5th	6	1	3	4	2
Senior totals				28	3	7	10	23
