= Reemt Pyka =

German ice hockey player

Personal information
- Nationality: German
- Born: 11 January 1969 (age 56); Bremerhaven, Germany

Sport
- Sport: Ice hockey

Reemt Pyka (born 11 January 1969) is a German ice hockey player. He competed in the men's tournament at the 1998 Winter Olympics.

== Career statistics ==
=== Regular season and playoffs ===
			Regular season					Playoffs
Season	Team	League	GP	G	A	Pts	PIM	GP	G	A	Pts	PIM
1986–87	Sportbund DJK Rosenheim	GER U20	—	—	—	—	—	—	—	—	—	—
1987–88	Sportbund DJK Rosenheim	GER U20	—	—	—	—	—	—	—	—	—	—
1987–88	Sportbund DJK Rosenheim	GER	5	0	0	0	0	3	0	0	0	0
1988–89	Sportbund DJK Rosenheim	GER U20	—	—	—	—	—	—	—	—	—	—
1988–89	Sportbund DJK Rosenheim	GER	23	6	1	7	12	7	1	2	3	0
1989–90	Sportbund DJK Rosenheim	GER U20	—	—	—	—	—	—	—	—	—	—
1989–90	Sportbund DJK Rosenheim	GER	30	7	6	13	12	11	3	3	6	12
1990–91	Sportbund DJK Rosenheim	GER	44	12	11	23	30	11	3	0	3	0
1991–92	Sportbund DJK Rosenheim	GER	37	9	9	18	8	10	0	0	0	4
1992–93	Krefelder EV 1981	GER	39	6	8	14	45	4	0	1	1	6
1993–94	Krefelder EV 1981	GER	44	12	11	23	18	6	1	1	2	12
1994–95	Krefelder EV 1981	DEL	42	15	11	26	36	15	5	1	6	22
1995–96	Krefeld Pinguine	DEL	46	4	13	17	54	—	—	—	—	—
1996–97	Krefeld Pinguine	DEL	48	5	11	16	44	3	1	1	2	2
1997–98	Krefeld Pinguine	DEL	43	8	6	14	42	9	1	1	2	8
1998–99	Krefeld Pinguine	DEL	50	11	4	15	53	4	1	0	1	4
1999–2000	Krefeld Pinguine	DEL	54	6	9	15	45	1	0	0	0	0
2000–01	Augsburger Panther	DEL	43	3	6	9	20	—	—	—	—	—
2001–02	Augsburger Panther	DEL	27	0	4	4	18	—	—	—	—	—
2001–02	EC Bad Nauheim	GER-2	43	9	17	26	59	—	—	—	—	—
2002–03	EC Bad Nauheim	GER-2	55	9	11	20	53	5	0	0	0	0
2003–04	EC Bad Nauheim	GER-2	50	14	8	22	32	10	3	1	4	22
2004–05	Fischtown Pinguins	GER-2	51	4	10	14	28	11	0	1	1	4
GER totals			222	52	46	98	125	52	8	7	15	34
DEL totals			353	52	64	116	312	32	8	3	11	36

=== International ===
Year	Team	Event	GP	G	A	Pts	PIM
1987	West Germany	EJC	7	0	0	0	2
1989	West Germany	WJC	7	0	2	2	2
1995	Germany	WC	5	0	1	1	6
1996	Germany	WCH	4	1	0	1	4
1997	Germany	OGQ	3	0	0	0	0
1997	Germany	WC	8	1	0	1	4
1998	Germany	OLY	4	0	0	0	0
1998	Germany	WC	6	0	0	0	4
2000	Germany	OGQ	3	0	0	0	0
Junior totals			14	0	2	2	4
Senior totals			33	2	1	3	18

"Reemt Pyka". Elite Prospects.
