= Luciano Borsato =

Canadian ice hockey player

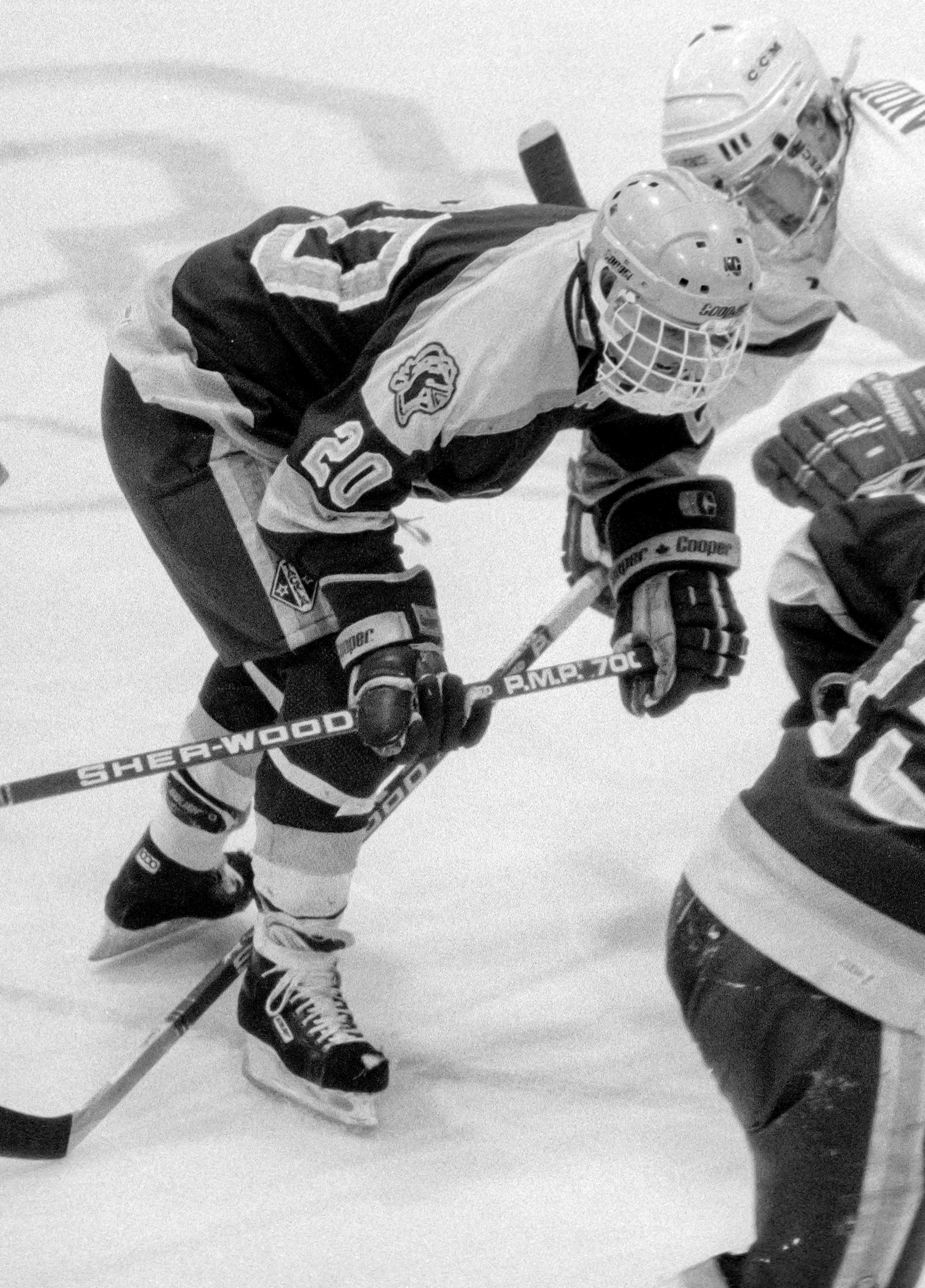
- Borsato at Clarkson, 1987
- Born: January 7, 1966 (age 60) Richmond Hill, Ontario, Canada
- Height: 6 ft 0 in (183 cm)
- Weight: 180 lb (82 kg; 12 st 12 lb)
- Position: Centre
- Shot: Right
- Played for: Winnipeg Jets
- National team: Canada
- NHL draft: 135th overall, 1984; Winnipeg Jets
- Playing career: 1988–2002
Medal record
Men's ice hockey
Representing Canada
World Championships
Bronze medal – third place	1995 Sweden	Ice hockey

Luciano Roberto Borsato (born January 7, 1966) is a Canadian former professional ice hockey player. Borsato played five seasons in the National Hockey League for the Winnipeg Jets.

== Playing career ==
Borsato was drafted in the 7th round, 135th overall by the Winnipeg Jets in the 1984 NHL entry draft. He grew up in Bramalea, Ontario and played Junior "B" hockey with the Bramalea Blues. He played collegiate hockey at Clarkson University from 1984 to 1988, and then played for the Moncton Hawks. He was recalled to the Winnipeg Jets for one game in the 1990-1991 season, and played the bulk of the subsequent season with the team. By 1995, he was playing in European leagues, where he would finish his career, having played for the Kölner Haie, HIFK, HC Davos and the Nuermberg Ice Tigers.

== Career statistics ==
=== Regular season and playoffs ===
			Regular season					Playoffs
Season	Team	League	GP	G	A	Pts	PIM	GP	G	A	Pts	PIM
1983–84	Bramalea Blues	MJBHL	37	20	36	56	49	—	—	—	—	—
1984–85	Clarkson University	ECAC	33	15	17	32	37	—	—	—	—	—
1985–86	Clarkson University	ECAC	32	17	20	37	50	—	—	—	—	—
1986–87	Clarkson University	ECAC	31	16	41	57	55	—	—	—	—	—
1987–88	Clarkson University	ECAC	33	15	29	44	38	—	—	—	—	—
1987–88	Moncton Hawks	AHL	3	1	1	2	0	—	—	—	—	—
1988–89	Tappara	FIN	44	31	36	67	69	7	0	3	3	4
1988–89	Moncton Hawks	AHL	6	2	5	7	4	—	—	—	—	—
1989–90	Moncton Hawks	AHL	1	1	0	1	0	—	—	—	—	—
1990–91	Winnipeg Jets	NHL	1	0	1	2	2	—	—	—	—	—
1990–91	Moncton Hawks	AHL	41	14	21	35	40	9	3	7	10	22
1991–92	Winnipeg Jets	NHL	56	15	21	36	45	1	0	0	0	0
1991–92	Moncton Hawks	AHL	14	2	7	9	39	—	—	—	—	—
1992–93	Winnipeg Jets	NHL	67	15	20	35	38	6	1	0	1	4
1993–94	Winnipeg Jets	NHL	75	5	13	18	28	—	—	—	—	—
1994–95	Winnipeg Jets	NHL	4	0	0	0	0	—	—	—	—	—
1994–95	Springfield Falcons	AHL	22	9	11	20	14	—	—	—	—	—
1995–96	Kölner Haie	DEL	49	25	36	61	52	12	6	8	14	28
1996–97	Kölner Haie	DEL	23	13	20	33	32	4	4	3	7	0
1997–98	Kölner Haie	DEL	27	12	14	26	75	3	0	1	1	27
1998–99	HIFK	FIN	8	4	7	11	0	11	4	3	7	20
1999–00	HIFK	FIN	1	0	0	0	0	—	—	—	—	—
1999–00	HC Davos	NLA	7	0	1	1	6	—	—	—	—	—
2000–01	Nürnberg Ice Tigers	DEL	57	15	31	46	101	4	0	1	1	2
2001–02	Nürnberg Ice Tigers	DEL	52	14	16	30	103	4	0	0	0	4
DEL totals			208	79	117	196	363	27	10	13	23	61
NHL totals			203	35	55	90	113	7	1	0	1	4

=== International ===
Year	Team	Event	GP	G	A	Pts	PIM
1995	Canada	WC	8	3	1	4	18
Senior totals			8	3	1	4	18

== Awards and honors ==
Award	Year
All-ECAC Hockey Second Team	1987–88
AHCA East Second-Team All-American	1987–88
