= Thomas Brandl =

German ice hockey player

Personal information
- Nationality: German
- Born: 9 February 1969 (age 56); Bad Tölz, West Germany

Sport
- Sport: Ice hockey

Thomas Brandl (born 9 February 1969) is a German ice hockey player. He competed in the men's tournaments at the 1992 Winter Olympics, the 1994 Winter Olympics and the 1998 Winter Olympics.

== Career statistics ==
=== Regular season and playoffs ===
| | | | Regular season | | | | | Playoffs |
| Season | Team | League | GP | G | A | Pts | PIM | GP | G | A | Pts | PIM |
|---|---|---|---|---|---|---|---|---|---|---|---|---|
| 1985–86 | EC Bad Tölz | FRG U20 |
| 1986–87 | EC Bad Tölz | FRG U20 |
| 1986–87 | EC Bad Tölz | FRG.2 | 31 | 33 | 34 | 67 | 72 | 9 | 3 | 20 | 23 | 23 |
| 1987–88 | Kölner EC | 1.GBun | 46 | 4 | 8 | 12 | 28 | — | — | — | — | — |
| 1988–89 | Kölner EC | 1.GBun | 25 | 4 | 10 | 14 | 34 | 7 | 1 | 3 | 4 | 4 |
| 1989–90 | Kölner EC | 1.GBun | 33 | 8 | 16 | 24 | 54 | 5 | 1 | 4 | 5 | 12 |
| 1990–91 | Kölner EC | 1.GBun | 44 | 16 | 34 | 50 | 80 | 14 | 5 | 6 | 11 | 32 |
| 1991–92 | Kölner EC | 1.GBun | 30 | 3 | 15 | 18 | 92 | 4 | 3 | 1 | 4 | 2 |
| 1992–93 | Kölner EC | 1.GBun | 43 | 19 | 23 | 42 | 45 | 12 | 6 | 12 | 18 | 6 |
| 1993–94 | Kölner EC | 1.GBun | 44 | 16 | 25 | 41 | 53 | 9 | 0 | 3 | 3 | 2 |
| 1994–95 | Kölner Haie | DEL | 38 | 18 | 35 | 53 | 48 | 15 | 8 | 13 | 21 | 16 |
| 1995–96 | Kölner Haie | DEL | 41 | 19 | 46 | 65 | 44 | 5 | 0 | 5 | 5 | 0 |
| 1996–97 | Düsseldorfer EG | DEL | 44 | 16 | 29 | 45 | 73 | 2 | 0 | 2 | 2 | 2 |
| 1997–98 | Düsseldorfer EG | DEL | 30 | 9 | 17 | 26 | 14 | 2 | 0 | 0 | 0 | 0 |
| 1998–99 | Krefeld Pinguine | DEL | 42 | 12 | 24 | 36 | 73 | 4 | 1 | 3 | 4 | 4 |
| 1999–2000 | Krefeld Pinguine | DEL | 47 | 15 | 33 | 48 | 72 | 3 | 0 | 1 | 1 | 27 |
| 2000–01 | Krefeld Pinguine | DEL | 34 | 3 | 11 | 14 | 101 | — | — | — | — | — |
| 2001–02 | Krefeld Pinguine | DEL | 55 | 9 | 18 | 27 | 70 | 3 | 0 | 2 | 2 | 49 |
| 2002–03 | Krefeld Pinguine | DEL | 26 | 3 | 8 | 11 | 12 | — | — | — | — | — |
| 2003–04 | EV Duisburg | GER.2 | 13 | 4 | 9 | 13 | 71 | — | — | — | — | — |
| 2003–04 | Krefeld Pinguine | DEL | 3 | 0 | 1 | 1 | 0 | — | — | — | — | — |
| 1.GBun totals | | | 265 | 70 | 131 | 201 | 386 | 51 | 16 | 29 | 45 | 58 |
| DEL totals | | | 360 | 104 | 222 | 326 | 507 | 34 | 9 | 26 | 35 | 98 |

=== International ===
| Year | Team | Event | GP | G | A | Pts | PIM |
|---|---|---|---|---|---|---|---|
| 1986 | West Germany | EJC | 5 | 5 | 2 | 7 | 4 |
| 1987 | West Germany | WJC B | 5 | 2 | 7 | 9 | 6 |
| 1987 | West Germany | EJC | 7 | 2 | 4 | 6 | 6 |
| 1988 | West Germany | WJC | 7 | 1 | 4 | 5 | 12 |
| 1989 | West Germany | WJC | 7 | 1 | 1 | 2 | 8 |
| 1990 | West Germany | WC | 10 | 0 | 2 | 2 | 10 |
| 1991 | Germany | WC | 10 | 3 | 2 | 5 | 14 |
| 1992 | Germany | OG | 7 | 0 | 2 | 2 | 4 |
| 1993 | Germany | WC | 6 | 0 | 1 | 1 | 12 |
| 1994 | Germany | OG | 8 | 1 | 3 | 4 | 10 |
| 1994 | Germany | WC | 5 | 0 | 1 | 1 | 0 |
| 1995 | Germany | WC | 5 | 5 | 1 | 6 | 6 |
| 1996 | Germany | WCH | 4 | 1 | 1 | 2 | 8 |
| 1997 | Germany | OGQ | 3 | 0 | 1 | 1 | 4 |
| 1998 | Germany | OG | 4 | 0 | 1 | 1 | 8 |
| Junior totals | | | 31 | 11 | 18 | 29 | 36 |
| Senior totals | | | 62 | 10 | 15 | 25 | 76 |

"Thomas Brandl". Elite Prospects.
