= Boo Ahl =

Swedish ice hockey goaltender (1969–2024)

- Born: 5 October 1969 Jönköping, Sweden
- Died: 8 August 2024 (aged 54) Moskenes, Norway
- Position: Goaltender
- Played for: HV71; Timrå IK
- National team: Sweden
Medal record
World Championships
Silver medal – second place	1995 Sweden	Team

Boo Ahl (5 October 1969 – 8 August 2024) was a Swedish ice hockey goaltender.

== Career ==
A goaltender for the club HV71, Ahl won national titles in 1995 and 2004. With the Sweden men's national ice hockey team, he won a silver medal at the 1995 Men's Ice Hockey World Championships.

== Personal life and death ==
Born in Jönköping on 5 October 1969, Boo Ahl was the father of Filip Ahl.

He died from cardiac arrest on the mountain of Reinebringen in Moskenes, Norway, on 8 August 2024. He was 54.
