= Sergei Sorokin =

Russian ice hockey player (born 1969)

- Born: October 2, 1969 (age 55); Gorky, Soviet Union
- Height: 5 ft 11 in (180 cm)
- Weight: 187 lb (85 kg; 13 st 5 lb)
- Position: Defence
- Shot: Right
- Played for: Torpedo Nizhny Novgorod; Dynamo Moscow; Düsseldorfer EG; Hannover Scorpions; Avangard Omsk; Khimik Voskresensk
- National team: Russia
- NHL draft: 247th overall, 1991; Winnipeg Jets
- Playing career: 1985–2004

Sergei Nikolaevich Sorokin (Russian: Сергей Никопаевич Сорокин; born October 2, 1969, in Gorky, Soviet Union) is a retired ice hockey player who played in the Soviet Hockey League. He played for Torpedo Gorky and HC Dynamo Moscow. He was inducted into the Russian and Soviet Hockey Hall of Fame in 1993.

== Career statistics ==
=== Regular season and playoffs ===
			Regular season					Playoffs
Season	Team	League	GP	G	A	Pts	PIM	GP	G	A	Pts	PIM
1985–86	Torpedo Gorky	URS	3	0	0	0	0	—	—	—	—	—
1986–87	Torpedo Gorky	URS	34	0	0	0	22	—	—	—	—	—
1987–88	Torpedo Gorky	URS	19	2	0	2	20	—	—	—	—	—
1988–89	Torpedo Gorky	URS	25	1	1	2	29	—	—	—	—	—
1989–90	Dynamo Moscow	URS	10	0	2	2	2	—	—	—	—	—
1989–90	Dynamo–2 Moscow	URS.3	6	3	2	5	2	—	—	—	—	—
1990–91	Dynamo Moscow	URS	41	4	5	9	20	—	—	—	—	—
1991–92	Dynamo Moscow	CIS	35	6	9	15	28	7	1	2	3	4
1991–92	Dynamo–2 Moscow	CIS.3	5	0	0	0	4	—	—	—	—	—
1992–93	Dynamo Moscow	IHL	38	12	8	20	20	10	1	0	1	6
1992–93	Dynamo–2 Moscow	RUS.2	1	0	0	0	0	—	—	—	—	—
1993–94	Dynamo Moscow	IHL	9	3	1	4	4	7	1	0	1	22
1993–94	Moncton Hawks	AHL	11	2	8	10	4	—	—	—	—	—
1994–95	HC Fassa	ITA	38	21	25	46	12	—	—	—	—	—
1994–95	Dynamo Moscow	IHL	—	—	—	—	—	5	1	3	4	6
1995–96	Düsseldorfer EG	DEL	48	11	26	37	50	13	3	5	8	16
1996–97	Düsseldorfer EG	DEL	45	7	18	25	34	4	0	3	3	2
1997–98	Düsseldorfer EG	DEL	16	1	5	6	6	—	—	—	—	—
1997–98	Hannover Scorpions	DEL	5	0	0	0	4	3	0	0	0	8
1998–99	Hannover Scorpions	DEL	1	0	0	0	0	—	—	—	—	—
1998–99	Avangard Omsk	RSL	24	3	9	12	60	5	0	1	1	16
1998–99	Avangard–2 Omsk	RUS.3	2	0	1	1	4	—	—	—	—	—
1999–2000	Düsseldorfer EG	DEU.2	47	10	27	37	88	11	4	3	7	18
2000–01	Düsseldorfer EG	DEL	55	13	16	29	90	—	—	—	—	—
2001–02	Khimik Voskresensk	RUS.2	50	14	21	35	122	12	5	5	10	6
2002–03	Khimik Voskresensk	RUS.2	33	4	9	13	42	13	2	4	6	10
2003–04	Khimik Voskresensk	RSL	18	0	2	2	24	—	—	—	—	—
2003–04	Torpedo Nizhny Novgorod	RSL	8	1	1	2	2	—	—	—	—	—
2003–04	EK Zell am See	AUT.2	2	0	0	0	2	—	—	—	—	—
URS/CIS totals			167	13	17	30	121	7	1	2	3	4
DEL totals			170	32	65	97	184	20	3	8	11	26

=== International ===
Year	Team	Event	Result	GP	G	A	Pts	PIM
1987	Soviet Union	EJC	3rd place, bronze medalist(s)	7	2	5	7	6
1988	Soviet Union	WJC	2nd place, silver medalist(s)	7	0	1	1	4
1989	Soviet Union	WJC	1st place, gold medalist(s)	7	1	3	4	14
1993	Russia	WC	1st place, gold medalist(s)	8	1	2	3	6
1994	Russia	OG	4th	8	1	2	3	6
1994	Russia	WC	5th	5	0	0	0	4
1995	Russia	WC	5th	6	1	2	3	6
Junior totals				21	3	9	12	24
Senior totals				27	3	6	9	22
