= Andrei Skopintsev =

Russian ice hockey player

- Born: September 28, 1971 (age 54) Elektrostal, Russian SFSR, URS
- Height: 6 ft 0 in (183 cm)
- Weight: 198 lb (90 kg; 14 st 2 lb)
- Position: Defence
- Shot: Right
- Played for: NHL; Atlanta Thrashers; Tampa Bay Lightning; KHL / RSL; Krylja Sovetov; HC Dynamo Moscow; Vityaz Chekhov; Sibir Novosibirsk; HC MVD; DEL; Augsburger Panther; SM-liiga; TPS Turku
- National team: Russia
- NHL draft: 153rd overall, 1997; Tampa Bay Lightning
- Playing career: 1989–2012

Andrei Borisovich Skopintsev (Russian: Андрей Борисович Скопинцев; born September 28, 1971) is a Russian former professional ice hockey defenceman who currently is an assistant coach for Dynamo Moscow in the KHL. During his playing career, which lasted from 1989 to 2012, he played for several teams in Russia and North America, including the Tampa Bay Lightning and Atlanta Thrashers of the National Hockey League. Internationally, Skopintsev played for Russia at five World Championships.

== Career ==
Skopintsev began his career with Kristall Elektrostal before moving to Krylja Sovetov, where he spent six seasons. In 1995, he moved to Germany's Deutsche Eishockey Liga, where he spent one season with the Augsburger Panther. There, he pulled out his best scoring numbers of his career. Despite his reputation as a stay-at-home defenceman, Skopintsev scored 10 goals and 20 assists for 30 points in 46 games.

He moved on to Finland's SM-liiga in 1996 and played for TPS Turku for two seasons. During that time, Skopintsev was drafted 153rd overall in the 1997 NHL entry draft by the Tampa Bay Lightning.

Despite his strong reputation he built in Europe, Skopintsev never managed to emulate his performances, bouncing between the NHL and the International Hockey League. He played for the Tampa Bay Lightning and then the Atlanta Thrashers, playing 40 regular-season games, scoring 2 goals and 4 assists for 6 points, collecting 32 penalty minutes. After three mediocre seasons in the American League, Skopintsev returned to Russia in 2001 and spent five seasons with HC Dynamo Moscow, and in 2006 he signed with Vityaz Chekhov.

== Career statistics ==
=== Regular season and playoffs ===
			Regular season					Playoffs
Season	Team	League	GP	G	A	Pts	PIM	GP	G	A	Pts	PIM
1987–88	Kristall Elektrostal	USSR-2	17	0	0	0	0	—	—	—	—	—
1988–89	Kristall Elektrostal	USSR-2	24	1	1	2	8	—	—	—	—	—
1989–90	Krylya Sovetov Moscow	USSR	20	0	0	0	10	—	—	—	—	—
1989–90	Kristall Elektrostal	USSR-2	38	2	2	4	20	—	—	—	—	—
1989–90	Kord Shchyokino	USSR-3	2	1	0	1	2	—	—	—	—	—
1990–91	Krylya Sovetov Moscow	USSR	16	0	1	1	2	—	—	—	—	—
1990–91	Kristall Elektrostal	USSR-2	8	3	1	4	8	—	—	—	—	—
1991–92	Krylya Sovetov Moscow	USSR	36	1	1	2	14	—	—	—	—	—
1991–92	Kristall Elektrostal	USSR-2	12	2	2	4	4	—	—	—	—	—
1992–93	Krylya Sovetov Moscow	RUS	12	1	0	1	4	7	1	0	1	2
1992–93	Krylya Sovetov Moscow-2	RUS-2	12	5	3	8	8	—	—	—	—	—
1992–93	Kristall Elektrostal	RUS-2	7	1	0	1	0	—	—	—	—	—
1993–94	Krylya Sovetov Moscow	RUS	4	8	12	14	3	1	0	1	0
1994–95	Soviet Wings	IHL	6	0	1	1	2	—	—	—	—	—
1994–95	Krylya Sovetov Moscow	Rus	52	8	12	20	55	4	1	1	2	0
1995–96	Augsburger Panther	DEL	46	10	20	30	32	7	3	2	5	22
1996–97	TPS	SM-l	46	3	6	9	80	10	1	1	2	4
1997–98	TPS	SM-l	48	2	9	11	8	4	0	1	1	4
1998–99	Cleveland Lumberjacks	IHL	19	3	2	5	8	—	—	—	—	—
1998–99	Tampa Bay Lightning	NHL	19	1	1	2	10	—	—	—	—	—
1999–00	Detroit Vipers	IHL	51	4	15	19	44	—	—	—	—	—
1999–00	Tampa Bay Lightning	NHL	4	0	0	0	6	—	—	—	—	—
2000–01	Orlando Solar Bears	IHL	25	0	6	6	22	—	—	—	—	—
2000–01	Atlanta Thrashers	NHL	17	1	3	4	16	—	—	—	—	—
2001–02	Dynamo Moscow	RSL	44	3	7	10	50	3	0	0	0	0
2002–03	Dynamo Moscow	RSL	37	1	3	4	32	4	0	0	0	24
2003–04	Dynamo Moscow	RSL	57	3	6	9	46	3	0	0	0	0
2004–05	Dynamo Moscow	RSL	38	1	2	3	63	10	0	0	0	6
2005–06	Dynamo Moscow	RSL	28	0	3	3	20	—	—	—	—	—
2006–07	Vityaz Chekhov	RSL	44	3	11	14	46	3	0	0	0	4
2007–08	Vityaz Chekhov	RSL	42	3	4	7	53	—	—	—	—	—
2008–09	Sibir Novosibirsk	KHL	55	5	6	11	62	—	—	—	—	—
2009–10	MVD	KHL	15	2	0	2	16	4	0	1	1	0
2009–10	THK Tver	VHL	1	0	1	1	0	—	—	—	—	—
2010–11	Sibir Novosibirsk	KHL	10	0	0	0	4	—	—	—	—	—
2011–12	Dynamo Balashikha	VHL	45	0	3	3	36	—	—	—	—	—
2011–12	Dynamo Moscow	KHL	2	0	0	0	2	—	—	—	—	—
USSR/RUS totals			470	28	60	88	409	37	3	1	4	38
KHL totals			82	7	6	13	84	4	0	1	1	0
NHL totals			40	2	4	6	32	—	—	—	—	—

=== International statistics ===
Year	Team	Event	GP	G	A	Pts	PIM
1995	Russia	WC	6	1	1	2	0
1996	Russia	WC	8	2	1	3	2
1997	Russia	WC	9	1	0	1	4
1998	Russia	WC	6	1	0	1	2
2004	Russia	WC	4	1	0	1	2
Senior totals			33	6	2	8	10
