= Jean-François Jomphe =

Canadian ice hockey player (born 1972)

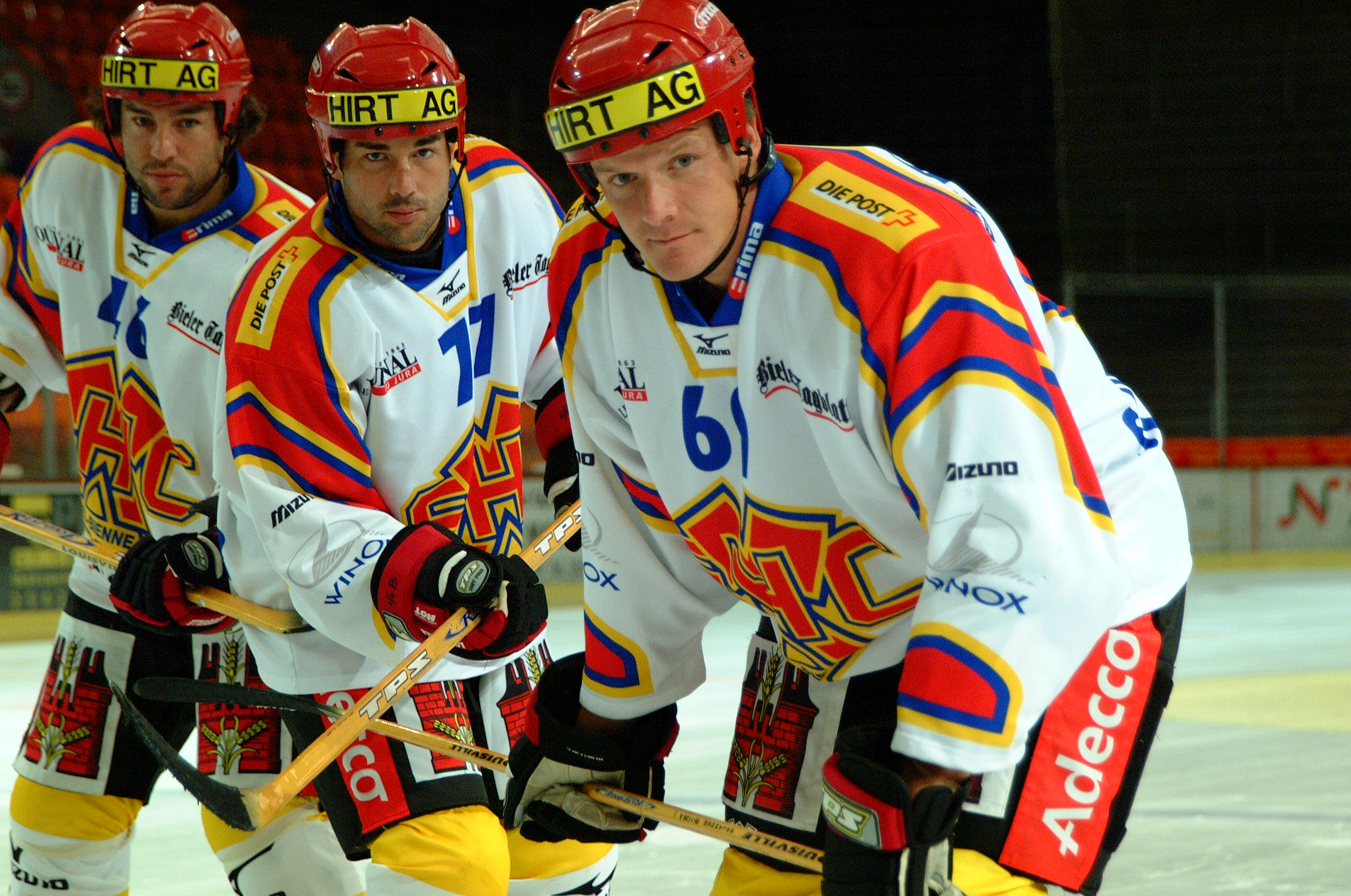
- Jean-François Jomphe (left)
- Born: December 28, 1972 (age 53) Havre St. Pierre, Quebec, Canada
- Height: 6 ft 2 in (188 cm)
- Weight: 194 lb (88 kg; 13 st 12 lb)
- Position: Centre
- Shot: Left
- Played for: Mighty Ducks of Anaheim; Phoenix Coyotes; Montreal Canadiens
- National team: Canada
- NHL draft: Undrafted
- Playing career: 1993–2005

Jean-François Jomphe
Medal record

Men's ice hockey

Representing Canada

World Championships
Bronze medal – third place	1995 Sweden	Ice hockey

Jean-François Joseph "J.F." Jomphe (born December 28, 1972) is a Canadian former professional ice hockey player. He played in the National Hockey League with the Mighty Ducks of Anaheim, Phoenix Coyotes, and Montreal Canadiens between 1995 and 1999. The rest of his career, which lasted from 1993 to 2005, was spent in various minor leagues and in Europe. Internationally Jomphe played for the Canadian national team at both the 1995 and 1996 World Championships, winning a bronze medal in 1995.

== Biography ==
As a youth, he played in the 1986 Quebec International Pee-Wee Hockey Tournament with a minor ice hockey team from Rosemère, Quebec.

Jomphe played 111 regular season games in the National Hockey League for the Mighty Ducks of Anaheim, Phoenix Coyotes and the Montreal Canadiens. He scored 10 goals and 29 assists for 39 points, collecting 102 penalty minutes. In 1999, Jomphe moved to Europe and played in Germany (Krefeld Pinguine, Adler Mannheim) and Switzerland before retiring in 2005. Jomphe has coached the LA Selects Hockey team.

Jomphe was married to his first wife Jaci Smith, heir to the Smith's grocery store chain. Jomphe married his second wife, Shay Lynn Gatlin, on May 12, 2006 at the St. Regis hotel in Monarch Beach, California, after meeting in 2000. In 2007 their only son, Presley Joseph Jomphe, was born. Jomphe & Shay divorced in 2010.

== Career statistics ==
=== Regular season and playoffs ===
			Regular season					Playoffs
Season	Team	League	GP	G	A	Pts	PIM	GP	G	A	Pts	PIM
1990–91	Shawinigan Cataractes	QMJHL	42	17	22	39	14	6	2	1	3	2
1991–92	Shawinigan Cataractes	QMJHL	44	28	33	61	64	10	6	10	16	10
1992–93	Shawinigan Cataractes	QMJHL	35	25	29	54	43	—	—	—	—	—
1992–93	Sherbrooke Faucons	QMJHL	25	18	14	32	45	15	10	13	23	20
1993–94	San Diego Gulls	IHL	29	2	3	5	12	—	—	—	—	—
1993–94	Greensboro Monarchs	ECHL	25	9	9	18	41	1	1	0	1	0
1994–95	Canadian National Team	Intl	52	33	25	58	85	—	—	—	—	—
1995–96	Mighty Ducks of Anaheim	NHL	31	2	12	14	39	—	—	—	—	—
1995–96	Baltimore Bandits	AHL	47	21	34	55	75	—	—	—	—	—
1996–97	Mighty Ducks of Anaheim	NHL	64	7	14	21	53	—	—	—	—	—
1997–98	Mighty Ducks of Anaheim	NHL	9	1	3	4	8	—	—	—	—	—
1997–98	Cincinnati Mighty Ducks	AHL	38	9	19	28	32	—	—	—	—	—
1997–98	Quebec Rafales	IHL	17	6	4	10	24	—	—	—	—	—
1998–99	Phoenix Coyotes	NHL	1	0	0	0	2	—	—	—	—	—
1998–99	Springfield Falcons	AHL	29	10	18	28	36	—	—	—	—	—
1998–99	Las Vegas Thunder	IHL	32	6	14	20	63	—	—	—	—	—
1998–99	Montreal Canadiens	NHL	6	0	0	0	0	—	—	—	—	—
1998–99	Fredericton Canadiens	AHL	3	1	3	4	6	15	5	11	16	49
1999–00	Krefeld Pinguine	DEL	47	12	33	45	109	4	0	1	1	6
2000–01	Adler Mannheim	DEL	47	11	16	27	178	11	5	5	10	22
2002–03	ERC Ingolstadt	DEL	46	13	27	40	110	—	—	—	—	—
2003–04	EHC Biel-Bienne	NLB	20	19	15	34	61	4	2	1	3	49
2004–05	EHC Biel-Bienne	NLB	22	10	15	25	22	—	—	—	—	—
AHL totals			117	41	74	115	149	15	5	11	16	49
NHL totals			111	10	29	39	102	—	—	—	—	—

=== International ===
Year	Team	Event	GP	G	A	Pts	PIM
1995	Canada	WC	8	4	0	4	6
1996	Canada	WC	8	0	1	1	4
Senior totals			16	4	1	5	10
