= Andrei Tarasenko (ice hockey) =

Russian ice hockey player (1968–2024)

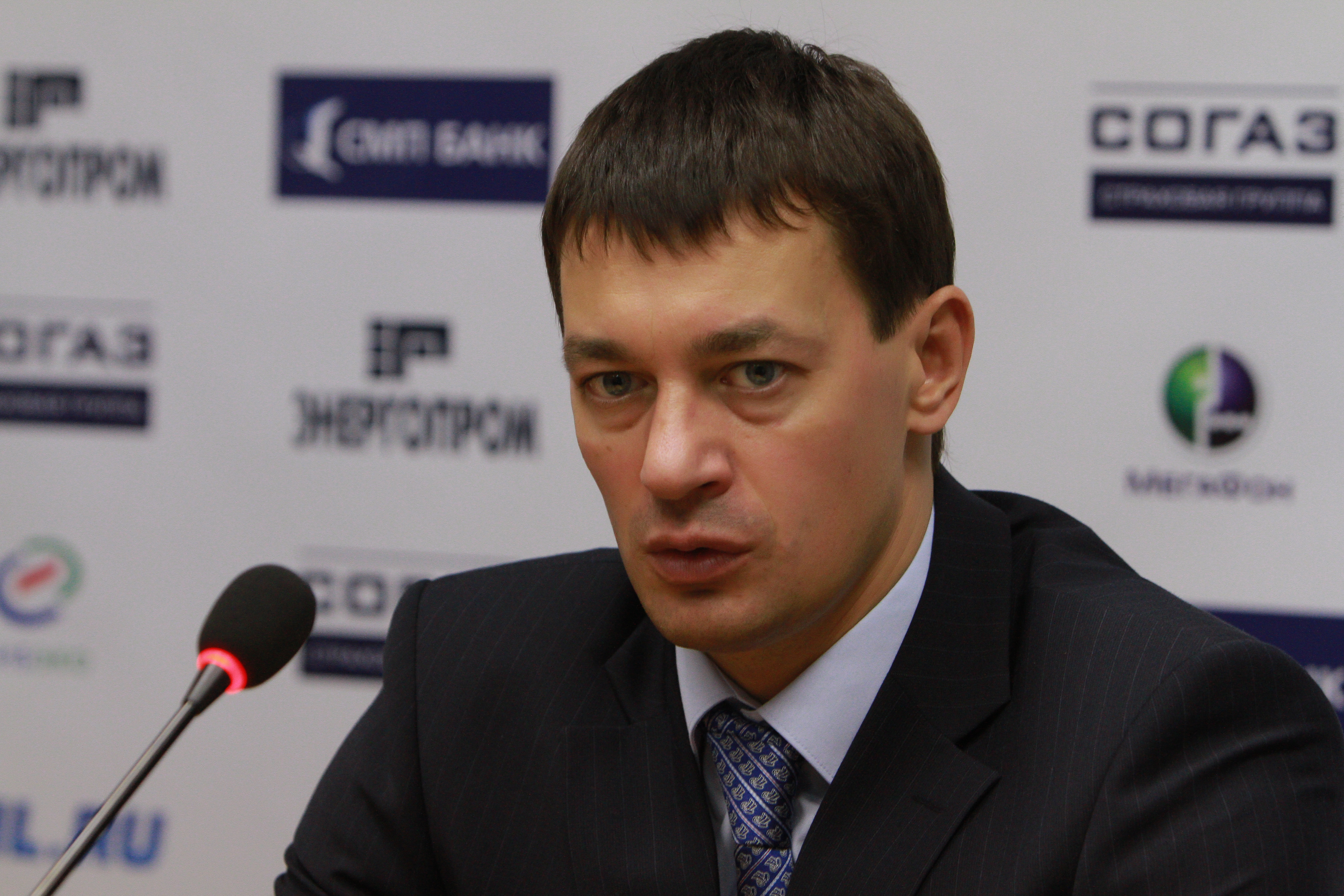
- Tarasenko in 2011
- Born: 11 September 1968 Novosibirsk, Russian SFSR, USSR
- Died: 11 July 2024 (aged 55) Novosibirsk, Russia
- Height: 5 ft 10 in (178 cm)
- Weight: 79 kg (174 lb; 12 st 6 lb)
- Position: Right wing
- Shot: Left
- Played for: Sibir Novosibirsk; SKA Novosibirsk; Torpedo Yaroslavl; Lada Togliatti; Torpedo Nizhny Novgorod; Kazakhmys Satpaev
- Coached for: Sibir Novosibirsk
- National team: Russia
- Playing career: 1984–2006
- Coaching career: 2008–2024

Andrei Vladimirovich Tarasenko (Russian: Андрей Владимирович Тарасенко, 11 September 1968 – 11 July 2024) was a Russian ice hockey player and coach. He participated in the 1994 Winter Olympics, where his team secured a fourth-place finish. He played in eight games and scored two goals. After retiring he worked as the head coach and then senior coach with Sibir Novosibirsk, the club he played for in 1984–1986 and 2001–2003.

Tarasenko died on 11 July 2024, at the age of 55. His son Vladimir is also an ice hockey player.

== Career statistics ==
=== Regular season and playoffs ===
			Regular season					Playoffs
Season	Team	League	GP	G	A	Pts	PIM	GP	G	A	Pts	PIM
1984–85	Sibir Novosibirsk	USSR II	3	0	0	0	0	—	—	—	—	—
1985–86	Sibir Novosibirsk	USSR II	8	0	0	0	0	—	—	—	—	—
1985–86	Mashinostroitel Novosibirsk	USSR III		3
1986–87	Sibir Novosibirsk	USSR II	33	4	5	9	4	—	—	—	—	—
1987–88	SKA Novosibirsk	USSR III	71	37	2	39	2	—	—	—	—	—
1988–89	SKA Novosibirsk	USSR II	71	36	17	53	40	—	—	—	—	—
1989–90	Torpedo Yaroslavl	USSR	46	12	4	16	14	—	—	—	—	—
1990–91	Torpedo Yaroslavl	USSR	46	14	18	32	26	—	—	—	—	—
1991–92	Torpedo Yaroslavl	CIS	7	2	5	7	2	—	—	—	—	—
1992–93	Torpedo Yaroslavl	IHL	42	11	8	19	10	4	2	0	2	0
1993–94	Torpedo Yaroslavl	IHL	44	26	31	57	18	4	3	1	4	4
1994–95	Torpedo Yaroslavl	IHL	50	17	37	54	50	—	—	—	—	—
1995–96	Torpedo Yaroslavl	IHL	52	14	27	41	16	—	—	—	—	—
1996–97	Lada Togliatti	RSL	25	9	12	21	14	11	2	2	4	8
1997–98	Lada Togliatti	RSL	46	20	40	60	16	5	3	3	6	0
1998–99	Lada Togliatti	RSL	22	4	13	17	14	7	2	4	6	6
1999–2000	Lada Togliatti	RSL	36	6	16	22	42	7	0	2	2	0
2000–01	Lada Togliatti	RSL	29	0	7	7	10	2	0	0	0	2
2001–02	Sibir Novosibirsk	RSL	51	21	40	61	26	14	7	6	13	12
2002–03	Sibir Novosibirsk	RSL	46	10	12	22	22	—	—	—	—	—
2003–04	Sibir Novosibirsk	RSL	3	1	0	1	0	—	—	—	—	—
2003–04	Torpedo Nizhny Novgorod	RSL	1	0	0	0	2	—	—	—	—	—
2003–04	Kazakhmys Satpaev	KAZ	6	3	3	6	2	—	—	—	—	—
2004–05	Kazakhmys Satpaev	KAZ	22	9	25	34	46	—	—	—	—	—
2004–05	Kazakhmys Satpaev	RUS II	50	23	33	56	44	—	—	—	—	—
2005–06	Kazakhmys Satpaev	KAZ	17	7	14	21	4	—	—	—	—	—
2005–06	Kazakhmys Satpaev	RUS II	44	11	29	40	34	—	—	—	—	—
USSR/CIS totals			99	28	27	55	42	—	—	—	—	—
IHL totals			188	68	103	171	94	8	5	1	6	4
RSL totals			208	50	100	150	120	32	7	11	18	16

=== International ===
Year	Team	Event	GP	G	A	Pts	PIM
1994	Russia	OG	8	2	0	2	0
1995	Russia	WC	6	1	3	4	2
Senior totals			14	3	3	6	2
