= Iain Fraser (ice hockey) =

Canadian ice hockey player (born 1969)

- Born: August 10, 1969 (age 56) Scarborough, Ontario, Canada
- Height: 5 ft 10 in (178 cm)
- Weight: 184 lb (83 kg; 13 st 2 lb)
- Position: Centre
- Shot: Left
- Played for: New York Islanders; Quebec Nordiques; Dallas Stars; Edmonton Oilers; Winnipeg Jets; San Jose Sharks
- National team: Canada
- NHL draft: 233rd overall, 1989; New York Islanders
- Playing career: 1990–2007

Iain Fraser
Medal record

Men's ice hockey

Representing Canada

World Championships
Bronze medal – third place	1995 Sweden	Ice hockey

Iain James Fraser (born August 10, 1969) is a Canadian former professional ice hockey centre. He was selected by the New York Islanders in the ninth round, 233rd overall, in the 1989 NHL entry draft.

== Biography ==
Fraser was born in Scarborough, Ontario. As a youth, he played in the 1982 Quebec International Pee-Wee Hockey Tournament with a minor ice hockey team from Oshawa.

Drafted from the Ontario Hockey League's Oshawa Generals, Fraser played three seasons in the American Hockey League with the Capital District Islanders before being called up to the National Hockey League to play for New York. Fraser only played seven games with the Islanders during the 1992–93 season and became a member of the Quebec Nordiques in 1993–94. He only played one season with the Nordiques; he recorded 17 goals and 20 assists, both career highs. In his NHL career, Fraser played in 94 games. He scored 23 goals and added 23 assists. He also appeared in four games with Winnipeg in the 1996 playoffs, going scoreless.

Fraser made brief appearances with the Dallas Stars (four games), the Edmonton Oilers (nine), the Winnipeg Jets (twelve), and the San Jose Sharks (two) to round out his NHL experience.

Fraser played four seasons in Germany's Deutsche Eishockey Liga before moving to the Fresno Falcons and also played three games in England for the Sheffield Steelers. He then spent three seasons in Italy, one in Serie A with HC Alleghe and two in Serie A2 with HC Merano. Fraser returned to England in 2006 with the Newcastle Vipers in the Elite Ice Hockey League. He picked up an assist in his debut game against the Cardiff Devils. After six games he left the team and retired.

== Career statistics ==
			Regular season					Playoffs
Season	Team	League	GP	G	A	Pts	PIM	GP	G	A	Pts	PIM
1986–87	Oshawa Legionaires	MJBHL	31	18	22	40	119	—	—	—	—	—
1986–87	Oshawa Generals	OHL	5	2	1	3	0	—	—	—	—	—
1987–88	Oshawa Generals	OHL	16	4	4	8	22	6	2	3	5	2
1988–89	Oshawa Generals	OHL	62	33	57	90	87	6	2	8	10	12
1989–90	Oshawa Generals	OHL	56	40	65	105	75	17	10	22	32	8
1990–91	Capital District Islanders	AHL	32	5	13	18	16	—	—	—	—	—
1990–91	Richmond Renegades	ECHL	3	1	1	2	0	—	—	—	—	—
1991–92	Capital District Islanders	AHL	45	9	11	20	24	—	—	—	—	—
1992–93	New York Islanders	NHL	7	2	2	4	2	—	—	—	—	—
1992–93	Capital District Islanders	AHL	74	41	69	110	16	4	0	1	1	0
1993–94	Quebec Nordiques	NHL	60	17	20	37	23	—	—	—	—	—
1994–95	Dallas Stars	NHL	4	0	0	0	0	—	—	—	—	—
1994–95	Denver Grizzlies	IHL	1	0	0	0	0	—	—	—	—	—
1994–95	Edmonton Oilers	NHL	9	3	0	3	0	—	—	—	—	—
1995–96	Winnipeg Jets	NHL	12	1	1	2	4	4	0	0	0	0
1995–96	Springfield Falcons	AHL	53	24	47	71	27	6	0	6	6	2
1996–97	San Jose Sharks	NHL	2	0	0	0	2	—	—	—	—	—
1996–97	Kentucky Thoroughblades	AHL	57	27	33	60	24	—	—	—	—	—
1997–98	Kansas City Blades	IHL	77	16	44	60	45	11	2	6	8	6
1998–99	SCH Säntis	NLB	24	18	9	27	20	—	—	—	—	—
1998–99	SERC Wild Wings	DEL	15	4	5	9	2	—	—	—	—	—
1999–00	SERC Wild Wings	DEL	56	13	27	40	24	—	—	—	—	—
2000–01	Berlin Capitals	DEL	59	19	25	44	24	3	0	2	2	35
2001–02	Frankfurt Lions	DEL	41	5	19	24	45	—	—	—	—	—
2002–03	Fresno Falcons	WCHL	15	2	6	8	4	—	—	—	—	—
2002–03	Sheffield Steelers	BISL	3	1	2	3	2	4	1	0	1	0
2003–04	HC Alleghe	Italy	36	10	47	57	20	1	0	0	0	0
2004–05	HC Merano	Italy2	35	19	46	65	37	12	4	17	21	4
2005–06	HC Merano	Italy2	34	14	26	40	24	5	1	2	3	6
2006–07	Newcastle Vipers	EIHL	6	3	6	9	2	2	0	0	0	2
NHL totals			94	23	23	46	31	4	0	0	0	0
