= Dmitri Frolov =

Russian ice hockey player (born 1966)

- Born: August 22, 1968 (age 57); Temirtau, Kazakh SSR, Soviet Union
- Height: 6 ft 1 in (185 cm)
- Weight: 202 lb (92 kg; 14 st 6 lb)
- Position: Defenceman
- Shot: Left
- Played for: Dinamo Riga; Dynamo Moscow; SKA Saint Petersburg; Wedemark; Avangard Omsk; CSKA Moscow; Barys Astana
- National team: Russia
- NHL draft: 146th, 1990; Calgary Flames
- Playing career: 1985–2002

Dmitri Nikolayevich Frolov (Russian: Дмитрий Николаевич Фролов; born August 22, 1966) is a retired ice hockey player who played in the Soviet Hockey League. He played for HC Dynamo Moscow and SKA St. Petersburg. He was inducted into the Russian and Soviet Hockey Hall of Fame in 1993.

== Career statistics ==
			Regular season					Playoffs
Season	Team	League	GP	G	A	Pts	PIM	GP	G	A	Pts	PIM
1985–86	HC Dynamo Kharkov	USSR-2	17	0	0	0	12	—	—	—	—	—
1986–87	HC Dynamo Kharkov	USSR-2	48	2	5	7	34	—	—	—	—	—
1987–88	Dinamo Riga	USSR	51	7	9	16	28	—	—	—	—	—
1988–89	Dinamo Riga	USSR	43	2	4	6	23	—	—	—	—	—
1989–90	Dynamo Moscow	USSR	45	2	9	11	18	—	—	—	—	—
1990–91	Dynamo Moscow	USSR	46	5	7	12	26	—	—	—	—	—
1991–92	Dynamo Moscow	CIS	26	0	4	4	12	—	—	—	—	—
1992–93	SKA Saint Petersburg	IHL	28	1	10	11	6	6	0	0	0	0
1993–94	HC Devils Milano	Serie A	28	1	23	24	18	—	—	—	—	—
1994–95	HC Devils Milano	Serie A	29	5	14	19	41	—	—	—	—	—
1995–96	EHC Lustenau	AUT	30	1	23	24	10	—	—	—	—	—
1996–97	Wedemark	DEL	47	2	14	16	20	8	0	1	1	6
1997–98	Dynamo Moscow	RSL	39	1	9	10	12	12	0	5	5	6
1998–99	Avangard Omsk	RSL	25	0	3	3	12	3	0	0	0	2
1999–00	CSKA Moscow	RSL	17	0	0	0	14	—	—	—	—	—

=== International statistics ===
Year	Team	Event	Place	GP	G	A	Pts	PIM
1993	Russia	WC	1st place, gold medalist(s)	8	0	0	0	4
1994	Russia	WC	5th	6	0	1	1	4
1995	Russia	WC	5th	6	0	4	4	6
Senior Int'l Totals				20	0	5	5	14
