= Maurizio Mansi =

Italian-Canadian ice hockey player and coach

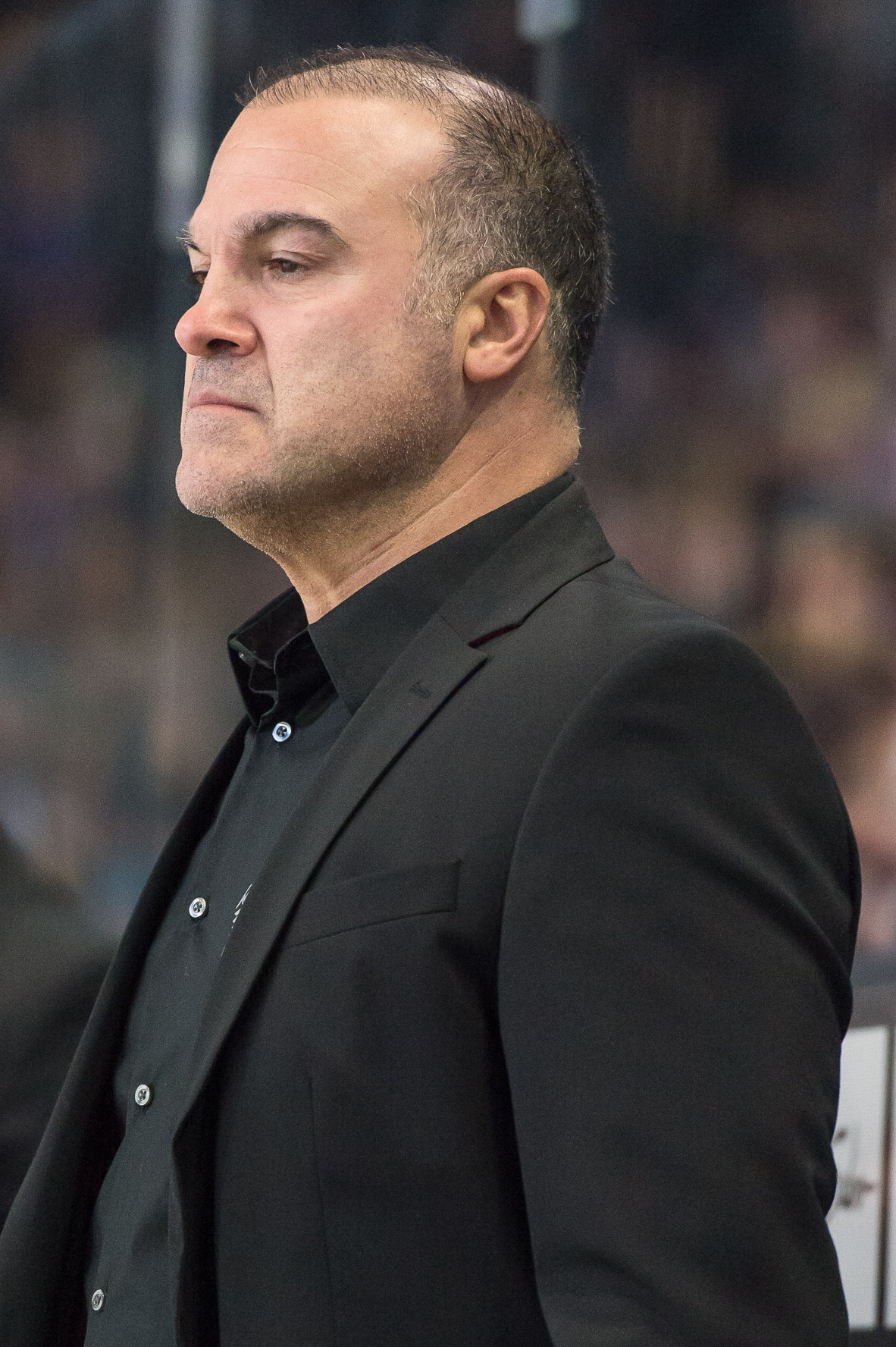
- Born: September 3, 1965 (age 60); Montreal, Quebec, Canada
- Height: 5 ft 10 in (178 cm)
- Weight: 186 lb (84 kg; 13 st 4 lb)
- Position: Right wing
- Shot: Left
- Played for: Flint Generals (AHL); Maine Mariners (AHL); HC Brunico (Serie A); HC Varese (Serie A); HC Milano (Serie A); ESV Kaufbeuren (DEL)
- National team: Canada and Italy
- NHL draft: 198th overall, 1985; Montreal Canadiens
- Playing career: 1988–2006

Maurizio (Maurice) Mansi (born September 3, 1965) is an Italian-Canadian ice hockey coach and a retired professional ice hockey winger. He last served as head coach of Swiss NLB team EHC Olten.

== Playing career ==
He was drafted in the 10th round by the Montreal Canadiens in 1985 while playing for the RPI Engineers men's ice hockey team. During the 1985 season they won the NCAA title while setting a record by going undefeated for 30 games. After finishing university Maurizio played in the minors and briefly with the Canadian National Team before going to Italy. He played sixteen seasons primarily in Italy (EV Bruneck, HC Varese, HC Milano Vipers) but also in Germany (Kaufbeurer Adler, SC Riessersee, Düsseldorfer EG) and England (London Knights) and won an Italian championship with Milano in the last year (2005–06) of his playing career.

== Coaching career ==
In 2006, Mansi turned to coaching taking over the head coaching job at Italian second division team All Stars Piemonte. In 2007, he was hired as head coach by ESV Kaufbeuren in Germany. In 2008–09, Mansi served as assistant coach of the Hamburg Freezers of the German elite league Deutsche Eishockey Liga (DEL), followed by a head coaching stint at SC Riessersee of the German third division. In 2010, Mansi embarked on a three-year stint as assistant coach EHC München of the German DEL, before joining the coaching staff of fellow DEL outfit Nürnberg Ice Tigers in 2013. He parted ways with the team in December 2014.

In January 2015, Mansi returned to SC Riessersee, serving as head coach for the remainder of the 2014-15 campaign.

Since 2012, he worked for the Spanish ice hockey federation and served as an assistant coach for Spain in the Division II world championships four times. In May 2016, he was named head coach of Swiss National League B (NLB) outfit EHC Olten. He was sacked on January 24, 2017. At that time, EHCO was sitting in fifth place of the NLB.

== International play ==
Maurizio Mansi played in the Olympics in 1994, and 1998 for team Italy. Additionally he played in the World Championships ten times.
