= Thomas Östlund =

Swedish ice hockey player

- Born: September 9, 1965 (age 60) Stockholm, Sweden
- Height: 6 ft 4 in (193 cm)
- Weight: 220 lb (100 kg; 15 st 10 lb)
- Position: Goaltender
- Caught: Left
- Played for: AIK IF; Djurgårdens IF Hockey
- National team: Sweden
- NHL draft: Undrafted
- Playing career: 1984–2002

Thomas Östlund, born September 9, 1965, is a Swedish former ice hockey goaltender. He was nicknamed "Osten".

Östlund was selected to the 1994-95 Elitserien All-Star Team, and was named the 1997-98 National League A Goaltender of the Year.

In March 2002, he announced his retirement following the 2001–2002 season.
