= Pavel Janků =

Czech ice hockey player

- Born: April 28, 1969 (age 57) Šumperk, Czechoslovakia
- Height: 5 ft 10 in (178 cm)
- Weight: 185 lb (84 kg; 13 st 3 lb)
- Position: Forward
- Shoots: Left
- Czech Extraliga team: BK Mladá Boleslav
- National team: Czech Republic
- Playing career: 1990–present

Pavel Janků (born April 28, 1969) is a Czech professional ice hockey player. He played with BK Mladá Boleslav in the Czech Extraliga during the 2010–11 Czech Extraliga season.
