= Roberto Triulzi =

Swiss ice hockey player

- Born: June 3, 1965 (age 60) Samedan, Graubünden, Switzerland
- Height: 5 ft 11 in (180 cm)
- Weight: 181 lb (82 kg; 12 st 13 lb)
- Position: Winger
- Shot: Right
- Played for: EHC St. Moritz; HC Lugano; SC Bern; EHC Biel
- Playing career: 1984–2000

Roberto Triulzi (born June 3, 1965, in Samedan, Graubünden) is a Swiss former professional ice hockey winger. From season 2002/03 to season 2005/06 he was sports director of the SC Bern.

== Career statistics ==
			Regular season					Playoffs
Season	Team	League	GP	G	A	Pts	PIM	GP	G	A	Pts	PIM
1980–81	Grischun Sud U17		—	—	—	—	—	—	—	—	—	—
1980–81	EHC St. Moritz U20	Junioren Inter	—	—	—	—	—	—	—	—	—	—
1981–82	EHC St. Moritz U20	Junioren Inter	12	10	18	28	—	—	—	—	—	—
1981–82	EHC St. Moritz	SwissDiv2	12	7	7	14	—	4	5	2	7	—
1982–83	EHC St. Moritz U20	Junioren Inter	—	—	—	—	—	—	—	—	—	—
1982–83	EHC St. Moritz	SwissDiv1	17	4	5	9	—	—	—	—	—	—
1983–84	EHC St. Moritz U20	Junioren B	—	—	—	—	—	—	—	—	—	—
1983–84	EHC St. Moritz	SwissDiv1	18	9	15	24	—	—	—	—	—	—
1984–85	EHC St. Moritz U20	Junioren B	—	—	—	—	—	—	—	—	—	—
1984–85	EHC St. Moritz	SwissDiv1	22	20	24	44	28	2	3	3	6	2
1985–86	HC Lugano	NLA	36	5	6	11	16	4	0	0	0	0
1986–87	HC Lugano	NLA	35	7	11	18	16	6	1	1	2	2
1987–88	SC Bern	NLA	36	14	9	23	46	—	—	—	—	—
1988–89	SC Bern	NLA	35	7	14	21	48	11	1	6	7	18
1989–90	SC Bern	NLA	26	6	10	16	26	11	2	5	7	14
1990–91	SC Bern	NLA	35	11	11	22	33	10	1	6	7	8
1991–92	SC Bern	NLA	24	8	7	15	36	11	2	1	3	14
1992–93	SC Bern	NLA	36	11	12	23	46	3	0	1	1	2
1993–94	SC Bern	NLA	36	18	18	36	12	5	1	2	3	32
1994–95	SC Bern	NLA	36	14	13	27	36	6	4	2	6	6
1995–96	SC Bern	NLA	36	10	22	32	40	5	1	2	3	4
1996–97	SC Bern	NLA	40	12	27	39	59	13	2	4	6	6
1997–98	SC Bern	NLA	40	15	11	26	65	7	2	3	5	4
1998–99	SC Bern	NLA	45	6	14	20	80	6	2	0	2	12
1999–00	EHC Biel-Bienne	NLB	31	9	17	26	49	9	2	4	6	10
NLA totals			496	144	185	329	559	98	19	33	52	122

== Achievements ==
- 1987 - NLA Champion with HC Lugano
- 1988 - NLA Champion with HC Lugano
- 1989 - NLA Champion with SC Bern
- 1991 - NLA Champion with SC Bern
- 1992 - NLA Champion with SC Bern
- 1997 - NLA Champion with SC Bern

== International play ==
Roberto Triulzi played a total of 109 games for the Swiss national team.
