= Alexei Yegorov (ice hockey, born 1976) =

Russian ice hockey player (1976-)

- Born: October 22, 1976 (age 48); Murmansk, Russian SFSR, Soviet Union
- Height: 5 ft 11 in (180 cm)
- Weight: 187 lb (85 kg; 13 st 5 lb)
- Position: Goaltender
- Caught: Left
- Played for: CSKA Moscow; Dynamo Moscow; Podolsk Vityaz; Krylya Sovetov Moscow; SKA Saint Petersburg; Voskresensk Khimik; Mytishchi Khimik; Vityaz Chekhov
- Playing career: 1999–2011

Alexei Yegorov (born October 22, 1976) is a Russian former professional ice hockey goaltender who last played for Vityaz Chekhov of the Kontinental Hockey League (KHL).
