= Mikael Sandberg =

Swedish ice hockey player

- Born: March 29, 1969 (age 57) Kungsbacka, Sweden
- Height: 5 ft 10 in (178 cm)
- Weight: 170 lb (77 kg; 12 st 2 lb)
- Position: Goaltender
- Caught: Left
- Played for: Västa Frölunda HC; EC VSV; Linköpings HC
- National team: Sweden
- Playing career: 1986–2006

Inge Jonas Mikael Sandberg (born March 29, 1969, in Kungsbacka, Sweden) is a retired Swedish ice hockey goaltender. He is currently working as a goaltending coach and assistant general manager of Tingsryds AIF of the HockeyAllsvenskan.

Sandberg played in the Elitserien for Västra Frölunda HC and Linköpings HC.
