= Tommy Sjödin =

Swedish ice hockey player

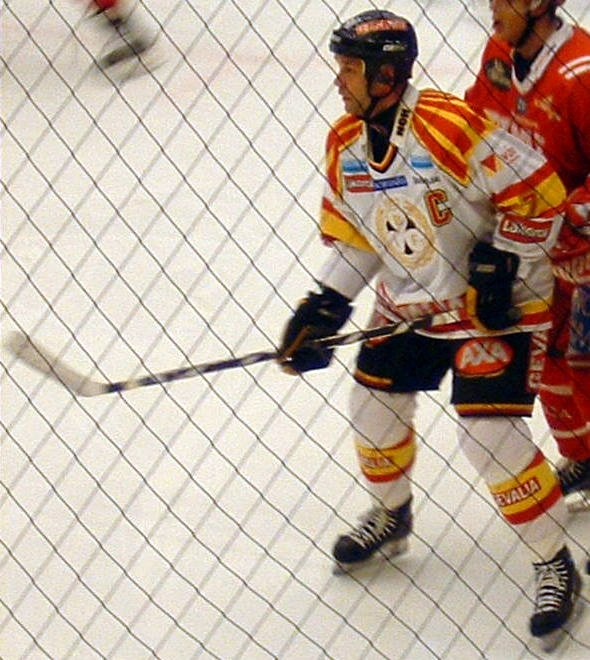
- Tommy Sjödin playing an away game for Brynäs IF against Timrå IK in the Swedish Elite League in December 2006
- Born: 13 August 1965 (age 60) Timrå, Sweden
- Height: 6 ft 0 in (183 cm)
- Weight: 198 lb (90 kg; 14 st 2 lb)
- Position: Defence
- Shot: Right
- Played for: Brynäs IF; Minnesota North Stars; Dallas Stars; Quebec Nordiques; HC Lugano; HC Bolzano; EHC Kloten
- National team: Sweden
- NHL draft: 237th overall, 1985; Minnesota North Stars
- Playing career: 1983–2008

Tommy Sören Sjödin (born 13 August 1965) is a Swedish former professional ice hockey defenceman, who played 106 NHL games during two seasons, five years for clubs in the Swiss Nationalliga A and fifteen seasons with Brynäs IF in the Swedish Elitserien.

== Playing career ==
Sjödin played in the Swedish Elitserien with Brynäs IF from 1986 to 1992, winning the Golden Puck as Sweden's top player in 1991-92. He went on to play in the National Hockey League for the Minnesota North Stars, Dallas Stars, and Quebec Nordiques between 1992 and 1994. He played in Switzerland with HC Lugano from 1994 to 1998, except for a brief period with HC Bolzano in Italy in 1996-97.

Before Sjödin returned to the Swedish Elite League, he played one season with Kloten. He then rejoined his former team, Brynäs IF, which was to become his last.

3 February 2007, in an away game against Frölunda, putting Brynäs up 2-1 he became the oldest player ever to score a goal in Elitserien; at the age of 41 years, 5 months and 21 days, breaking Börje Salming's record from 1992.

Sjödin played for the Swedish national team in four IIHF World Championships from 1992 to 1996, and was on the 1992 Olympic team.

== Career statistics ==
=== Regular season and playoffs ===
			Regular season					Playoffs
Season	Team	League	GP	G	A	Pts	PIM	GP	G	A	Pts	PIM
1983–84	Timrå IK	SWE II	16	4	4	8	6	6	0	0	0	4
1984–85	Timrå IK	SWE II	23	8	11	19	14	—	—	—	—	—
1985–86	Timrå IK	SWE II	32	13	12	25	40	—	—	—	—	—
1986–87	Brynäs IF	SEL	29	0	4	4	24	—	—	—	—	—
1987–88	Brynäs IF	SEL	40	6	9	15	28	—	—	—	—	—
1988–89	Brynäs IF	SEL	40	8	11	19	52	5	1	0	1	6
1989–90	Brynäs IF	SEL	40	14	14	28	46	5	0	0	0	2
1990–91	Brynäs IF	SEL	38	12	17	29	77	2	0	1	1	2
1991–92	Brynäs IF	SEL	40	6	16	22	46	5	0	3	3	4
1992–93	Minnesota North Stars	NHL	77	7	29	36	30	—	—	—	—	—
1993–94	Dallas Stars	NHL	7	0	2	2	4	—	—	—	—	—
1993–94	Quebec Nordiques	NHL	22	1	9	10	18	—	—	—	—	—
1993–94	Kalamazoo Wings	IHL	38	12	32	44	22	—	—	—	—	—
1994–95	HC Lugano	NDA	36	17	27	44	36	5	3	2	5	2
1995–96	HC Lugano	NDA	30	3	21	24	26	4	2	2	4	2
1996–97	HC Bolzano	Serie A	6	2	2	4	0	—	—	—	—	—
1996–97	HC Lugano	NDA	45	23	28	51	55	8	2	4	6	2
1997–98	HC Lugano	NDA	29	12	19	31	36	7	4	1	5	0
1998–99	EHC Kloten	NDA	33	6	19	25	22	8	1	2	3	6
1999–2000	Brynäs IF	SEL	50	8	14	22	44	11	0	5	5	10
2000–01	Brynäs IF	SEL	50	9	11	20	69	4	0	2	2	2
2001–02	Brynäs IF	SEL	49	11	21	32	38	4	1	0	1	33
2002–03	Brynäs IF	SEL	50	9	13	22	30	—	—	—	—	—
2003–04	Brynäs IF	SEL	49	9	15	24	50	—	—	—	—	—
2004–05	Brynäs IF	SEL	50	7	15	22	52	—	—	—	—	—
2005–06	Brynäs IF	SEL	48	9	10	19	60	1	0	0	0	2
2006–07	Brynäs IF	SEL	50	6	20	26	66	7	0	1	1	12
2007–08	Brynäs IF	SEL	52	2	9	11	92	—	—	—	—	—
SEL totals			675	116	199	315	774	44	2	12	14	73
NHL totals			106	8	40	48	52	—	—	—	—	—
NDA/NLA totals			173	61	114	175	175	32	12	11	23	12

=== International ===
Tommy Sjödin
Medal record

Men's ice hockey

World Championships
Silver medal – second place	1995	Sweden
Bronze medal – third place	1994	Sweden
Gold medal – first place	1992	Sweden

Year	Team	Event	GP	G	A	Pts	PIM
1992	Sweden	OLY	8	4	1	5	2
1992	Sweden	WC	8	0	1	1	6
1994	Sweden	WC	8	0	0	0	6
1995	Sweden	WC	8	2	3	5	6
1996	Sweden	WC	6	1	1	2	0
Senior totals			38	7	6	13	20

Preceded by Thomas Rundqvist	Golden Puck; 1992	Succeeded by Peter Forsberg
