= Stanislav Romanov =

Russian ice hockey player

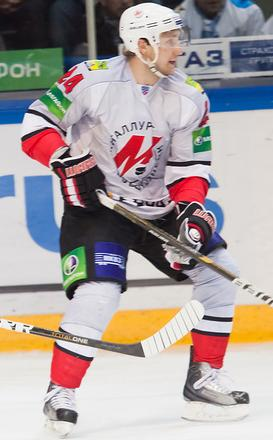
- Born: 14 May 1987 (age 39) Saratov, Russian SFSR
- Height: 6 ft 0 in (183 cm)
- Weight: 209 lb (95 kg; 14 st 13 lb)
- Position: Defence
- Shoots: Left
- VHL team Former teams: Dizel Penza; Lokomotiv Yaroslavl; Metallurg Novokuznetsk; Neftekhimik Nizhnekamsk; Lada Togliatti; HC Yugra; HC Vityaz
- Playing career: 2006–present

Stanislav Romanov (born 14 May 1987) is a Russian professional ice hockey defenceman who is currently playing with Dizel Penza in the Supreme Hockey League (VHL). He previously played three seasons for HC Vityaz of the Kontinental Hockey League (KHL).

On May 19, 2014, Romanov was traded by Neftekhimik Nizhnekamsk in exchange for draft picks to Lada Togliatti for the 2014–15 season.
