= Stephan Figliuzzi =

Italian ice hockey player

Personal information
- Nationality: Italian
- Born: 23 July 1968 (age 56); Montreal, Quebec, Canada

Sport
- Sport: Ice hockey

Stephan Figliuzzi (born 23 July 1968) is an Italian ice hockey player. He competed in the men's tournaments at the 1994 Winter Olympics and the 1998 Winter Olympics.
