= Otakar Vejvoda =

- Born: 18 June 1972 (age 52); Kladno, Czechoslovakia
- Height: 5 ft 8 in (173 cm)
- Weight: 161 lb (73 kg; 11 st 7 lb)
- Position: Forward
- Shot: Right
- Played for: HC Kladno; AIK IF
- National team: Czech Republic
- NHL draft: Undrafted
- Playing career: 1990–2010

Medal record

Representing Czech Republic

Men's ice hockey

World Championships
Gold medal – first place	1996 Austria	

Otakar Vejvoda (born 18 June 1972 in Kladno, Czechoslovakia) is a Czech former ice hockey forward. He was a member of the gold medal-winning Czech team at the 1996 World Championships.
