= Denis Afinogenov =

Russian ice hockey player and coach

- Born: March 15, 1974 (age 51) Ufa, Russia
- Height: 183 cm (6 ft 0 in)
- Weight: 94 kg (207 lb; 14 st 11 lb)
- Position: Right wing
- Shot: Left
- Played for: UHL; Muskegon Fury; RSL; Salavat Yulayev Ufa; Lokomotiv Yaroslavl; Lada Togliatti; Avangard Omsk; Metallurg Novokuznetsk; Slovak Extraliga; HC Slovan Bratislava
- National team: Russia
- NHL draft: Undrafted
- Playing career: 1992–2008

Denis Alexandrovich Afinogenov (Russian: Дени́с Алекса́ндрович Афиноге́нов; born 15 March 1974) is a Russian retired professional ice hockey player, currently serving as head coach of Agidel Ufa of the Zhenskaya Hockey League (ZhHL), a position he has held since January 2016, and an assistant coach to the Russian women's national ice hockey team.

During his playing career, Afinogenov played with several teams in the Russian Superleague, the Muskegon Fury of the United Hockey League (UHL), and HC Slovan Bratislava in the Slovak Extraliga.
