= Radek Bělohlav =

Czech ice hockey player and coach

- Born: 11 April 1970 (age 55) České Budějovice, Czechoslovakia
- Height: 6 ft 0 in (183 cm)
- Weight: 185 lb (84 kg; 13 st 3 lb)
- Position: Forward
- Shoots: Left
- Czech Extraliga team: HC Kladno
- National team: Czech Republic
- Playing career: 1989–present

Radek Bělohlav (born 11 April 1970) is a Czech former professional ice hockey player, and a current coach. He played with HC Kladno in the Czech Extraliga during the 2010–11 Czech Extraliga season.
