= 1996–97 DEL season =

1996–97 Deutsche Eishockey Liga season
- League: Deutsche Eishockey Liga
- Sport: Ice hockey
- Teams: 16

1996–97
- Season champions: Adler Mannheim

DEL seasons
- ← 1995–96 1997–98 →

The 1996–97 Deutsche Eishockey Liga season was the 3rd season of the Deutsche Eishockey Liga (English: German Ice Hockey League).

Adler Mannheim became the DEL Champion, winning a German title for the second time in their history. Both the Ratinger Löwen and Wedemark Scorpions earned their keep in the league playing against 1st League EHC Neuwied and TSV Erding.

The Bosman ruling, a 1995 decision of the European Court of Justice regarding the movement of labor in soccer, had profound influence on the league. The old Bundesliga had national character: German clubs competing for the German title with mostly German players. After the ruling European Union players were excluded from the "foreign" player quota. Within a year, the DEL teams employed 97 EU players and lowered their costs significantly, enabling the smaller teams to compete more effectively. The frequent player moves were not viewed positively by the fans.

Another visible change for the fans was the change in corporate sponsorship. The Krombacher Brewery ended their agreement with the league, resulting in a change in the league logo design. The league would not have a corporate sponsor again until 2003, when the German Yellow Pages (German: Gelbe Seiten) signed two consecutive 3-year agreements.

== Regular season ==
The mode of play changed for this season. In the first round, all teams played one home and one away game with each other for a total of 30 rounds. The first 6 placed teams continued playing for the playoff placements Meisterrunde), and the teams 7-16 played to against relegation/playdowns (Relegationsrunde), with only the 2 best-placed teams in this group being eligible for playoffs.

=== Phase I ===
	Team	GP	W	T	L	OTL	GF:GA	Points
1.	Kölner Haie	30	22	1	7	2	157:91	47
2.	Adler Mannheim	30	20	3	7	1	130:74	44
3.	Berlin Capitals	30	17	4	9	2	107:79	40
4.	Kassel Huskies	30	18	2	10	1	121:102	39
5.	EHC Eisbären Berlin	30	18	3	9	0	118:91	39
6.	Starbulls Rosenheim	30	16	2	12	3	111:113	37
7.	EV Landshut	30	16	1	13	3	125:77	36
8.	Krefeld Pinguine	30	15	0	15	3	105:108	33
9.	Düsseldorfer EG	30	15	2	13	0	93:90	32
10.	Frankfurt Lions	30	13	3	14	1	85:88	30
11.	Schwenninger ERC Wild Wings	30	13	1	16	3	114:128	30
12.	Kaufbeurer Adler	30	12	2	16	3	112:157	29
13.	Augsburger Panther	30	11	4	15	1	91:114	27
14.	Wedemark Scorpions (N)	30	8	1	21	2	95:134	19
15.	Nürnberg Ice Tigers	30	5	3	22	0	90:148	13
16.	Ratinger Löwen	30	4	2	24	2	74:134	12

GP = Games, W = Win, T = Tie, L = Loss, OTL = Overtime loss, GF:GA = Goals For : Goals Against
= Continue play for playoff spots, = Continue play against relegation

=== Phase II - "Meisterrunde" ===
	Team	GP	W	T	L	OTL	GF:GA	Points
1.	Adler Mannheim	50	35	5	10	1	212:123	76
2.	Kölner Haie	50	36	2	12	2	235:142	76
3.	Kassel Huskies	50	27	4	19	1	190:167	59
4.	EHC Eisbären Berlin	50	26	4	20	1	177:163	57
5.	Berlin Capitals	50	23	6	21	3	162:149	55
6.	Starbulls Rosenheim	50	20	2	28	5	171:209	47

GP = Games, W = Win, T = Tie, L = Loss, OTL = Overtime loss, GF:GA = Goals For : Goals Against

=== Phase II - "Relegationsrunde" ===
The first two placed teams qualified for the playoff spots 7 and 8.

	Team	GP	W	T	L	OTL	GF:GA	Points
1.	EV Landshut	48	29	3	16	3	202:122	64
2.	Krefeld Pinguine	48	28	2	18	3	198:166	61
3.	Düsseldorfer EG	48	28	2	18	0	164:138	58
4.	Schwenninger ERC Wild Wings	48	23	1	24	5	200:191	52
5.	Augsburger Panther	48	21	5	22	1	176:181	48
6.	Frankfurt Lions	48	21	4	23	1	136:142	47
7.	Kaufbeurer Adler	48	17	3	28	3	166:252	40
8.	Wedemark Scorpions	48	12	1	35	3	150:231	28
9.	Nürnberg Ice Tigers	48	9	6	33	1	149:229	25
10.	Ratinger Löwen	48	9	2	37	2	136:219	22

GP = Games, W = Win, T = Tie, L = Loss, OTL = Overtime loss, GF:GA = Goals for : GoalsaAgainst
Color code: = Playoff = Playdowns

== Playdowns ==
=== First round ===
The first round was played in the best-of-seven mode.

			Game	1	2	3	4	5	6	7
Düsseldorfer EG	-	Ratinger Löwen	4:0	5:1	5:3	2:0	6:2	–	–	–
Schwenninger Wild Wings	-	Nürnberg Ice Tigers	4:1	4:1	2:3	6:1	5:3	11:3	–	–
Augsburger Panther	-	Wedemark Scorpions	4:0	7:1	2:1	5:4	5:3	–	–	–
Frankfurt Lions	-	Kaufbeurer Adler	2:4	3:2	3:6	4:3	3:6	2:5	1:4	–

=== Second round ===
The second round was played in a best-of-five mode.

			Game	1	2	3	4	5
Wedemark Scorpions	-	Nürnberg Ice Tigers	1:3	4:6	4:6	5:2	2:5	–
Frankfurt Lions	-	Ratinger Löwen	3:0	6:1	5:4	5:3	–	–

Wedemark Scorpions (now known as Hannover Scorpions) and Ratinger Löwen (English: Ratinger Lions) had to play against the first two placed teams of the second league.

=== Relegation ===
The relegation round was played in a best-of-three mode.

			Game	1	2	3
EHC Neuwied	-	Ratinger Löwen	0:2	2:4	3:10	–
Wedemark Scorpions	-	TSV Erding	2:0	10:2	9:5	–

Both the Ratinger Löwen and Wedemark Scorpions earned their keep in the DEL.

== Playoffs ==
All playoff rounds were played in as a best-of-five series, with the better placed team playing Home-Away-Home-Away-Home.

Quarterfinals
2	Adler Mannheim	3
8	Krefeld Pinguine	0
1	Kölner Haie	1
7	EV Landshut	3
4	Kassel Huskies	3
6	Starbulls Rosenheim	0
5	EHC Eisbären Berlin	3
3	Berlin Capitals	1

Semifinals
2	Adler Mannheim	3
7	EV Landshut	0
4	Kassel Huskies	3
5	EHC Eisbären Berlin	1

Finals
2	Adler Mannheim	3
4	Kassel Huskies	0

=== Quarterfinals ===
			Game	1	2	3	4	5
Adler Mannheim	-	Krefeld Pinguine	3:0	4:1	4:1	8:4	–	–
Kölner Haie	-	EV Landshut	1:3	6:3	3:4	2:4	1:3	–
Kassel Huskies	-	Starbulls Rosenheim	3:0	6:1	4:1	5:4	–	–
EHC Eisbären Berlin	-	Berlin Capitals	3:1	4:3	3:4	5:0	4:1	–

=== Semifinals ===
			Game	1	2	3	4	5
Adler Mannheim	-	EV Landshut	3:0	7:5	2:4	4:3	–	–
Kassel Huskies	-	EHC Eisbären Berlin	3:1	4:2	4:5	6:3	3:1	–

=== Finals ===
			Game	1	2	3	4	5
Adler Mannheim	-	Kassel Huskies	3:0	5:4	5:2	4:2	–	–

With the last game, the Adler Mannheim became first time DEL Champion and won the German Champion title for the 2nd 8th time in the club history.

== Player awards ==
Category	Name	Team	Record
Points	(Canada) (Italy) Bruno Zarrillo	Kölner Haie	74 Points
Goals	(Canada) Chris Lindberg	Krefeld Pinguine	37 Goals
Goalie	(Canada) (Italy) Mike Rosati	Adler Mannheim	2.35 Goals-against-average
Defense	(Canada) Gordon Hynes	Schwenninger ERC Wild Wings	56 Points
