= Ice hockey at the 2002 Winter Olympics – Men's team rosters =

Rosters for the Ice hockey at the 2002 Winter Olympics in Salt Lake City, USA.

== Austria ==
Head coach: (Canada) Ron Kennedy

Assistant coach: Greg Holst

No.	Pos.	Name	Height	Weight	Birthdate	Team
4	D	Gerhard Unterluggauer	5 ft 10 in (178 cm)	194 lb (88 kg)	August 15, 1976 (aged 25)	(Germany) Schwenninger Wild Wings
6	D	Dominic Lavoie	6 ft 2 in (188 cm)	212 lb (96 kg)	November 21, 1967 (aged 34)	(Germany) Hannover Scorpions
9	D	Tom Searle	5 ft 11 in (180 cm)	190 lb (86 kg)	April 26, 1963 (aged 38)	(Austria) EC VSV
10	F	Christoph Brandner	6 ft 5 in (196 cm)	214 lb (97 kg)	July 5, 1975 (aged 26)	(Germany) Krefeld Pinguine
11	F	Gerald Ressman	6 ft 4 in (193 cm)	225 lb (102 kg)	July 24, 1970 (aged 31)	(Austria) EC KAC
12	F/D	Matthias Trattnig	6 ft 1 in (185 cm)	212 lb (96 kg)	April 22, 1979 (aged 22)	(Sweden) Djugårdens IF
13	D	Robert Lukas	5 ft 10 in (178 cm)	185 lb (84 kg)	August 29, 1978 (aged 23)	(Austria) Black Wings Linz
15	F	Oliver Setzinger	6 ft 0 in (183 cm)	196 lb (89 kg)	July 11, 1983 (aged 18)	(Finland) Ilves
16	D	Thomas Pöck	6 ft 1 in (185 cm)	203 lb (92 kg)	December 2, 1981 (aged 20)	(United States) UMass Minutemen
18	F	Kent Salfi	5 ft 10 in (178 cm)	181 lb (82 kg)	June 10, 1971 (aged 30)	(Austria) EC VSV
21	F	Mario Schaden	5 ft 8 in (173 cm)	187 lb (85 kg)	April 30, 1972 (aged 29)	(Austria) EC KAC
22	F	Martin Hohenberger	6 ft 1 in (185 cm)	207 lb (94 kg)	January 29, 1977 (aged 25)	(Germany) Revierlöwen Oberhausen
24	F	Günther Lanzinger	6 ft 2 in (188 cm)	194 lb (88 kg)	January 4, 1972 (aged 30)	(Austria) EC VSV
25	G	Michael Suttnig	5 ft 11 in (180 cm)	172 lb (78 kg)	November 8, 1973 (aged 28)	(Austria) EC KAC
26	F	Simon Wheeldon	6 ft 0 in (183 cm)	185 lb (84 kg)	August 30, 1966 (aged 35)	(Germany) München Barons
27	D/F	Wolfgang Kromp	5 ft 9 in (175 cm)	187 lb (85 kg)	September 17, 1970 (aged 31)	(Austria) EC VSV
28	D	Peter Kasper	6 ft 0 in (183 cm)	194 lb (88 kg)	December 20, 1974 (aged 27)	(Austria) HC Innsbruck
29	F	Christian Perthaler	6 ft 0 in (183 cm)	198 lb (90 kg)	July 21, 1968 (aged 33)	(Austria) Black Wings Linz
31	G	Claus Dalpiaz	5 ft 9 in (175 cm)	154 lb (70 kg)	October 10, 1971 (aged 30)	(Austria) HC Innsbruck
32	D	André Lakos	6 ft 7 in (201 cm)	238 lb (108 kg)	July 29, 1979 (aged 22)	(United States) Utah Grizzlies
38	G	Reinhard Divis	6 ft 0 in (183 cm)	192 lb (87 kg)	July 4, 1975 (aged 26)	(United States) Worcester IceCats
47	D	Martin Ulrich (C)	6 ft 2 in (188 cm)	209 lb (95 kg)	December 16, 1969 (aged 32)	(Germany) DEG Metro Stars
74	F	Dieter Kalt	5 ft 9 in (175 cm)	183 lb (83 kg)	June 26, 1974 (aged 27)	(Sweden) Färjestad BK

== Belarus ==
Head coach: (Russia) Vladimir Krikunov

Assistant coaches: Anatoli Belyayev, Valeri Voronin

No.	Pos.	Name	Height	Weight	Birthdate	Team
2	G	Sergei Shabanov	6 ft 2 in (188 cm)	205 lb (93 kg)	February 4, 1974 (aged 28)	(Russia) Metallurg Novokuznetsk
3	D	Oleg Khmyl	6 ft 0 in (183 cm)	218 lb (99 kg)	January 30, 1970 (aged 32)	(Russia) Lada Togliatti
4	D	Alexander Makritsky	6 ft 1 in (185 cm)	198 lb (90 kg)	August 11, 1971 (aged 30)	(Germany) Revierlöwen Oberhausen
5	D	Oleg Romanov	6 ft 0 in (183 cm)	187 lb (85 kg)	March 31, 1970 (aged 31)	(Russia) Severstal Cherepovets
6	D	Igor Matushkin	6 ft 2 in (188 cm)	207 lb (94 kg)	January 27, 1965 (aged 37)	(Sweden) Skellefteå AIK
9	F	Alexander Andriyevsky	6 ft 5 in (196 cm)	212 lb (96 kg)	August 10, 1968 (aged 33)	(Russia) Khimik Voskresensk
11	F	Vadim Bekbulatov	6 ft 1 in (185 cm)	192 lb (87 kg)	March 8, 1970 (aged 31)	(Belarus) Keramin Minsk
13	F	Andrei Kovalev	6 ft 0 in (183 cm)	185 lb (84 kg)	April 2, 1966 (aged 35)	(Germany) Revierlöwen Oberhausen
14	F	Vasili Pankov	6 ft 0 in (183 cm)	187 lb (85 kg)	August 15, 1968 (aged 33)	(Germany) Augsburger Panther
16	F	Andrei Skabelka	6 ft 1 in (185 cm)	203 lb (92 kg)	January 20, 1971 (aged 31)	(Russia) Lada Togliatti
17	F	Alexei Kalyuzhny	5 ft 10 in (178 cm)	187 lb (85 kg)	June 13, 1977 (aged 24)	(Russia) Metallurg Magnitogorsk
18	F	Oleg Antonenko	6 ft 2 in (188 cm)	203 lb (92 kg)	July 1, 1971 (aged 30)	(Russia) Severstal Cherepovets
19	F	Eduard Zankovets	5 ft 10 in (178 cm)	172 lb (78 kg)	September 27, 1969 (aged 32)	(Russia) Torpedo Nizhny Novgorod
21	D	Oleg Mikulchik	6 ft 2 in (188 cm)	201 lb (91 kg)	June 27, 1964 (aged 37)	(Russia) Khimik Voskresensk
23	D	Ruslan Salei	6 ft 2 in (188 cm)	205 lb (93 kg)	November 2, 1974 (aged 27)	(United States) Mighty Ducks of Anaheim
24	F	Dmitri Dudik	6 ft 0 in (183 cm)	201 lb (91 kg)	November 2, 1977 (aged 24)	(Belarus) HK Gomel
26	D/F	Sergei Stas	6 ft 0 in (183 cm)	181 lb (82 kg)	April 28, 1974 (aged 27)	(Germany) Krefeld Pinguine
27	D	Alexander Zhurik	6 ft 4 in (193 cm)	220 lb (100 kg)	May 29, 1975 (aged 26)	(Russia) Krylia Sovetov Moskva
28	F	Konstantin Koltsov	6 ft 0 in (183 cm)	223 lb (101 kg)	April 7, 1981 (aged 20)	(Russia) Ak Bars Kazan
29	F	Vladimir Tsyplakov	6 ft 2 in (188 cm)	192 lb (87 kg)	April 18, 1969 (aged 32)	(Russia) Ak Bars Kazan
30	D	Vladimir Kopat	5 ft 10 in (178 cm)	185 lb (84 kg)	April 23, 1971 (aged 30)	(Russia) Neftekhimik Nizhnekamsk
31	G	Andrei Mezin	6 ft 0 in (183 cm)	172 lb (78 kg)	July 8, 1974 (aged 27)	(Germany) Berlin Capitals
32	F	Dmitri Pankov	6 ft 1 in (185 cm)	192 lb (87 kg)	October 29, 1974 (aged 27)	(Russia) Metallurg Novokuznetsk
33	G	Leonid Fatikov	6 ft 0 in (183 cm)	192 lb (87 kg)	April 24, 1968 (aged 33)	(Germany) Kassel Huskies
37	F	Andrei Rasolko	5 ft 11 in (180 cm)	176 lb (80 kg)	September 13, 1968 (aged 33)	(Russia) Severstal Cherepovets

== Canada ==
Head coach: Pat Quinn

Assistant coaches: Wayne Fleming, Ken Hitchcock, Jacques Martin

No.	Pos.	Name	Height	Weight	Birthdate	Team
2	D	Al MacInnis	6 ft 2 in (188 cm)	201 lb (91 kg)	July 11, 1963 (aged 38)	(United States) St. Louis Blues
3	D	Eric Brewer	6 ft 4 in (193 cm)	216 lb (98 kg)	April 17, 1979 (aged 22)	(Canada) Edmonton Oilers
4	D	Rob Blake	6 ft 4 in (193 cm)	220 lb (100 kg)	December 10, 1969 (aged 32)	(United States) Colorado Avalanche
9	F	Paul Kariya	5 ft 10 in (178 cm)	181 lb (82 kg)	October 16, 1974 (aged 27)	(United States) Mighty Ducks of Anaheim
11	F	Owen Nolan	6 ft 1 in (185 cm)	214 lb (97 kg)	February 12, 1972 (aged 29)	(United States) San Jose Sharks
12	F	Jarome Iginla	6 ft 1 in (185 cm)	209 lb (95 kg)	July 1, 1977 (aged 24)	(Canada) Calgary Flames
14	F	Brendan Shanahan	6 ft 3 in (191 cm)	220 lb (100 kg)	January 23, 1969 (aged 33)	(United States) Detroit Red Wings
19	F	Steve Yzerman (A)	5 ft 11 in (180 cm)	185 lb (84 kg)	May 9, 1965 (aged 36)	(United States) Detroit Red Wings
20	G	Ed Belfour	6 ft 0 in (183 cm)	214 lb (97 kg)	April 21, 1965 (aged 36)	(United States) Dallas Stars
21	F	Simon Gagné	6 ft 1 in (185 cm)	194 lb (88 kg)	February 29, 1980 (aged 21)	(United States) Philadelphia Flyers
25	F	Joe Nieuwendyk	6 ft 2 in (188 cm)	203 lb (92 kg)	September 10, 1966 (aged 35)	(United States) Dallas Stars
27	D	Scott Niedermayer	6 ft 1 in (185 cm)	201 lb (91 kg)	August 31, 1973 (aged 28)	(United States) New Jersey Devils
30	G	Martin Brodeur	6 ft 2 in (188 cm)	220 lb (100 kg)	May 6, 1972 (aged 29)	(United States) New Jersey Devils
31	G	Curtis Joseph	5 ft 11 in (180 cm)	194 lb (88 kg)	April 29, 1967 (aged 34)	(Canada) Toronto Maple Leafs
37	F	Michael Peca	6 ft 0 in (183 cm)	187 lb (85 kg)	March 26, 1974 (aged 27)	(United States) New York Islanders
44	D	Chris Pronger	6 ft 6 in (198 cm)	220 lb (100 kg)	October 10, 1974 (aged 27)	(United States) St. Louis Blues
52	D	Adam Foote	6 ft 2 in (188 cm)	227 lb (103 kg)	July 10, 1971 (aged 30)	(United States) Colorado Avalanche
55	D	Ed Jovanovski	6 ft 3 in (191 cm)	220 lb (100 kg)	June 26, 1976 (aged 25)	(Canada) Vancouver Canucks
66	F	Mario Lemieux (C)	6 ft 4 in (193 cm)	231 lb (105 kg)	October 5, 1965 (aged 36)	(United States) Pittsburgh Penguins
74	F	Theo Fleury	5 ft 6 in (168 cm)	181 lb (82 kg)	June 29, 1968 (aged 33)	(United States) New York Rangers
88	F	Eric Lindros	6 ft 4 in (193 cm)	240 lb (110 kg)	February 28, 1973 (aged 28)	(United States) New York Rangers
91	F	Joe Sakic (A)	5 ft 11 in (180 cm)	194 lb (88 kg)	July 7, 1969 (aged 32)	(United States) Colorado Avalanche
94	F	Ryan Smyth	6 ft 2 in (188 cm)	190 lb (86 kg)	February 21, 1976 (aged 25)	(Canada) Edmonton Oilers

== Czech Republic ==
Head coach: Josef Augusta

Assistant coaches: Vladimír Martinec, Vladimír Růžička

No.	Pos.	Name	Height	Weight	Birthdate	Team
1	G	Roman Turek	6 ft 4 in (193 cm)	220 lb (100 kg)	May 21, 1970 (aged 31)	(Canada) Calgary Flames
3	D	Roman Hamrlík	6 ft 1 in (185 cm)	207 lb (94 kg)	April 12, 1974 (aged 27)	(United States) New York Islanders
6	D	Jaroslav Špaček	5 ft 11 in (180 cm)	203 lb (92 kg)	February 11, 1974 (aged 27)	(United States) Chicago Blackhawks
9	F	Martin Havlát	6 ft 2 in (188 cm)	209 lb (95 kg)	April 19, 1981 (aged 20)	(Canada) Ottawa Senators
10	F	Pavel Patera	6 ft 1 in (185 cm)	187 lb (85 kg)	September 6, 1971 (aged 30)	(Russia) Avangard Omsk
13	D	Pavel Kubina	6 ft 4 in (193 cm)	243 lb (110 kg)	April 15, 1977 (aged 24)	(United States) Tampa Bay Lightning
15	D	Tomáš Kaberle	6 ft 1 in (185 cm)	212 lb (96 kg)	March 2, 1978 (aged 23)	(Canada) Toronto Maple Leafs
16	F	Petr Čajánek	5 ft 11 in (180 cm)	185 lb (84 kg)	August 18, 1975 (aged 26)	(Czech Republic) HC Zlín
17	F	Petr Sýkora	6 ft 0 in (183 cm)	190 lb (86 kg)	November 19, 1976 (aged 25)	(United States) New Jersey Devils
19	F	Radek Dvořák	6 ft 2 in (188 cm)	194 lb (88 kg)	March 9, 1977 (aged 24)	(United States) New York Rangers
20	F	Robert Lang	6 ft 3 in (191 cm)	212 lb (96 kg)	December 19, 1970 (aged 31)	(United States) Pittsburgh Penguins
21	F	Robert Reichel (A)	5 ft 10 in (178 cm)	183 lb (83 kg)	June 25, 1971 (aged 30)	(Canada) Toronto Maple Leafs
23	G	Roman Čechmánek	6 ft 3 in (191 cm)	201 lb (91 kg)	March 2, 1971 (aged 30)	(United States) Philadelphia Flyers
24	F	Milan Hejduk	6 ft 0 in (183 cm)	192 lb (87 kg)	February 14, 1976 (aged 25)	(United States) Colorado Avalanche
25	F	Patrik Eliáš	6 ft 1 in (185 cm)	190 lb (86 kg)	April 13, 1976 (aged 25)	(United States) New Jersey Devils
26	F	Martin Ručinský (A)	6 ft 2 in (188 cm)	209 lb (95 kg)	March 11, 1971 (aged 30)	(United States) Dallas Stars
29	D	Michal Sýkora	6 ft 5 in (196 cm)	234 lb (106 kg)	July 5, 1973 (aged 28)	(Czech Republic) HC Pardubice
30	F	Jiří Dopita	6 ft 4 in (193 cm)	227 lb (103 kg)	December 2, 1968 (aged 33)	(United States) Philadelphia Flyers
38	F	Jan Hrdina	6 ft 0 in (183 cm)	207 lb (94 kg)	February 5, 1976 (aged 26)	(United States) Pittsburgh Penguins
39	G	Dominik Hašek	6 ft 0 in (183 cm)	165 lb (75 kg)	January 29, 1965 (aged 37)	(United States) Detroit Red Wings
41	D	Martin Škoula	6 ft 3 in (191 cm)	223 lb (101 kg)	October 28, 1979 (aged 22)	(United States) Colorado Avalanche
42	D	Richard Šmehlík	6 ft 4 in (193 cm)	222 lb (101 kg)	January 23, 1970 (aged 32)	(United States) Buffalo Sabres
68	F	Jaromír Jágr (C)	6 ft 3 in (191 cm)	230 lb (100 kg)	February 15, 1972 (aged 29)	(United States) Washington Capitals

== Finland ==
Head coach: Hannu Aravirta

Assistant coaches: Jari Kurri, Esko Nokelainen

No.	Pos.	Name	Height	Weight	Birthdate	Team
4	D	Kimmo Timonen (A)	5 ft 10 in (178 cm)	194 lb (88 kg)	March 18, 1975 (aged 26)	(United States) Nashville Predators
5	D	Sami Salo	6 ft 3 in (191 cm)	216 lb (98 kg)	March 22, 1974 (aged 27)	(Canada) Ottawa Senators
6	D	Ossi Väänänen	6 ft 4 in (193 cm)	216 lb (98 kg)	August 18, 1980 (aged 21)	(United States) Phoenix Coyotes
7	D	Aki Berg	6 ft 4 in (193 cm)	214 lb (97 kg)	July 28, 1977 (aged 24)	(Canada) Toronto Maple Leafs
8	F	Teemu Selänne (C)	6 ft 0 in (183 cm)	201 lb (91 kg)	July 3, 1970 (aged 31)	(United States) San Jose Sharks
10	F	Ville Nieminen	6 ft 0 in (183 cm)	207 lb (94 kg)	April 6, 1977 (aged 24)	(United States) Colorado Avalanche
12	F	Olli Jokinen	6 ft 2 in (188 cm)	209 lb (95 kg)	December 5, 1978 (aged 23)	(United States) Florida Panthers
14	F	Raimo Helminen	6 ft 0 in (183 cm)	194 lb (88 kg)	March 11, 1964 (aged 37)	(Finland) Ilves
16	F	Niklas Hagman	6 ft 0 in (183 cm)	205 lb (93 kg)	December 5, 1979 (aged 22)	(United States) Florida Panthers
17	F	Tomi Kallio	6 ft 0 in (183 cm)	190 lb (86 kg)	January 27, 1977 (aged 25)	(United States) Atlanta Thrashers
21	D	Jyrki Lumme	6 ft 1 in (185 cm)	214 lb (97 kg)	July 16, 1966 (aged 35)	(Canada) Toronto Maple Leafs
22	F	Mikko Eloranta	6 ft 0 in (183 cm)	190 lb (86 kg)	August 24, 1972 (aged 29)	(United States) Los Angeles Kings
24	F	Sami Kapanen	5 ft 10 in (178 cm)	181 lb (82 kg)	June 14, 1973 (aged 28)	(United States) Carolina Hurricanes
26	F	Jere Lehtinen	6 ft 0 in (183 cm)	194 lb (88 kg)	June 24, 1973 (aged 28)	(United States) Dallas Stars
27	D	Teppo Numminen (A)	6 ft 1 in (185 cm)	198 lb (90 kg)	July 3, 1968 (aged 33)	(United States) Phoenix Coyotes
30	G	Pasi Nurminen	5 ft 10 in (178 cm)	190 lb (86 kg)	December 17, 1975 (aged 26)	(United States) Atlanta Thrashers
31	G	Jussi Markkanen	6 ft 0 in (183 cm)	185 lb (84 kg)	May 8, 1975 (aged 26)	(Canada) Edmonton Oilers
35	G	Jani Hurme	6 ft 0 in (183 cm)	198 lb (90 kg)	January 7, 1975 (aged 27)	(Canada) Ottawa Senators
36	F	Juha Ylönen	6 ft 1 in (185 cm)	185 lb (84 kg)	February 13, 1972 (aged 29)	(United States) Tampa Bay Lightning
37	F	Jarkko Ruutu	6 ft 1 in (185 cm)	203 lb (92 kg)	August 23, 1975 (aged 26)	(Canada) Vancouver Canucks
41	F	Antti Aalto	6 ft 1 in (185 cm)	214 lb (97 kg)	March 4, 1975 (aged 26)	(Finland) Jokerit
42	F	Juha Lind	5 ft 11 in (180 cm)	185 lb (84 kg)	January 2, 1974 (aged 28)	(Sweden) Södertälje SK
44	D	Janne Niinimaa	6 ft 1 in (185 cm)	220 lb (100 kg)	May 22, 1975 (aged 26)	(Canada) Edmonton Oilers

== France ==
Head coach: (Finland) Heikki Leime

Assistant coach: (Sweden) Christer Eriksson

No.	Pos.	Name	Height	Weight	Birthdate	Team
1	G	Cristobal Huet	6 ft 0 in (183 cm)	205 lb (93 kg)	October 3, 1973 (aged 28)	(Switzerland) HC Lugano
2	D	Allan Carriou	6 ft 1 in (185 cm)	187 lb (85 kg)	February 2, 1976 (aged 26)	(France) Rouen
3	D	Vincent Bachet	5 ft 11 in (180 cm)	187 lb (85 kg)	April 29, 1978 (aged 23)	(France) Reims
6	F	Benoît Bachelet	5 ft 9 in (175 cm)	176 lb (80 kg)	November 6, 1974 (aged 27)	(France) Brûleurs de Loups
7	F/D	Stéphane Barin	5 ft 10 in (178 cm)	172 lb (78 kg)	January 8, 1971 (aged 31)	(Germany) Krefeld Pinguine
8	F	Arnaud Briand	6 ft 1 in (185 cm)	198 lb (90 kg)	April 29, 1970 (aged 31)	(Sweden) Luleå HF
9	F	Maurice Rozenthal	5 ft 10 in (178 cm)	174 lb (79 kg)	June 20, 1975 (aged 26)	(Sweden) IF Björklöven
10	F	Laurent Meunier	5 ft 11 in (180 cm)	183 lb (83 kg)	January 6, 1979 (aged 23)	(United States) UMass Lowell River Hawks
11	F	François Rozenthal	5 ft 10 in (178 cm)	170 lb (77 kg)	June 20, 1975 (aged 26)	(Sweden) IF Björklöven
12	F	Philippe Bozon	5 ft 11 in (180 cm)	192 lb (87 kg)	November 30, 1966 (aged 35)	(Switzerland) Genève-Servette HC
13	D	Karl DeWolf	5 ft 11 in (180 cm)	170 lb (77 kg)	February 21, 1972 (aged 29)	(France) Gothiques d'Amiens
14	F	Yorick Treille	6 ft 3 in (191 cm)	196 lb (89 kg)	July 5, 1980 (aged 21)	(United States) UMass Lowell River Hawks
16	F	Guillaume Besse	5 ft 11 in (180 cm)	198 lb (90 kg)	January 26, 1976 (aged 26)	(France) Rouen
20	D	Jean-François Bonnard	5 ft 11 in (180 cm)	203 lb (92 kg)	September 14, 1971 (aged 30)	(France) Brûleurs de Loups
22	F	Jonathan Zwikel	6 ft 0 in (183 cm)	192 lb (87 kg)	July 15, 1975 (aged 26)	(France) Reims
23	F	Anthony Mortas	6 ft 0 in (183 cm)	190 lb (86 kg)	February 13, 1974 (aged 27)	(France) Reims
24	D	Denis Perez	6 ft 2 in (188 cm)	203 lb (92 kg)	April 25, 1964 (aged 37)	(France) Gothiques d'Amiens
25	F	Richard Aimonetto	6 ft 0 in (183 cm)	190 lb (86 kg)	January 24, 1973 (aged 29)	(France) Reims
26	D	Benoît Pourtanel	6 ft 11 in (211 cm)	190 lb (86 kg)	April 12, 1974 (aged 27)	(France) Ducs d'Angers
27	D	Baptiste Amar	6 ft 0 in (183 cm)	192 lb (87 kg)	November 11, 1979 (aged 22)	(United States) UMass Lowell River Hawks
28	F	Laurent Gras	5 ft 10 in (178 cm)	185 lb (84 kg)	March 15, 1976 (aged 25)	(France) Gothiques d'Amiens
30	G	Fabrice Lhenry	5 ft 11 in (180 cm)	181 lb (82 kg)	June 29, 1972 (aged 29)	(France) Scorpions de Mulhouse
31	G	Patrick Rolland	5 ft 9 in (175 cm)	172 lb (78 kg)	July 7, 1969 (aged 32)	(France) Brûleurs de Loups

== Germany ==
Head coach: Hans Zach

Assistant coaches: Bernhard Englbrecht, Ernst Höfner

No.	Pos.	Name	Height	Weight	Birthdate	Team
6	D	Jörg Mayr	5 ft 10 in (178 cm)	168 lb (76 kg)	January 4, 1970 (aged 32)	(Germany) Kölner Haie
10	D	Christian Ehrhoff	6 ft 2 in (188 cm)	201 lb (91 kg)	July 6, 1982 (aged 19)	(Germany) Krefeld Pinguine
12	D	Mirko Lüdemann	5 ft 11 in (180 cm)	192 lb (87 kg)	December 15, 1973 (aged 28)	(Germany) Kölner Haie
13	D	Christoph Schubert	6 ft 3 in (191 cm)	236 lb (107 kg)	February 5, 1982 (aged 20)	(Germany) München Barons
16	F	Wayne Hynes	6 ft 0 in (183 cm)	201 lb (91 kg)	May 26, 1969 (aged 32)	(Germany) Adler Mannheim
17	F	Jochen Hecht	6 ft 1 in (185 cm)	192 lb (87 kg)	June 21, 1977 (aged 24)	(Canada) Edmonton Oilers
18	F	Andreas Loth	6 ft 0 in (183 cm)	190 lb (86 kg)	February 26, 1972 (aged 29)	(Germany) Kassel Huskies
19	F	Marco Sturm	5 ft 11 in (180 cm)	194 lb (88 kg)	September 8, 1978 (aged 23)	(United States) San Jose Sharks
20	F	Jürgen Rumrich (C)	5 ft 11 in (180 cm)	187 lb (85 kg)	March 20, 1968 (aged 33)	(Germany) Nürnberg Ice Tigers
21	F	Stefan Ustorf	5 ft 11 in (180 cm)	194 lb (88 kg)	January 3, 1974 (aged 28)	(Germany) Adler Mannheim
22	F	Martin Reichel	6 ft 2 in (188 cm)	190 lb (86 kg)	November 7, 1973 (aged 28)	(Germany) Nürnberg Ice Tigers
26	F	Daniel Kreutzer	5 ft 9 in (175 cm)	192 lb (87 kg)	October 23, 1979 (aged 22)	(Germany) Kassel Huskies
27	F	Tobias Abstreiter	5 ft 9 in (175 cm)	185 lb (84 kg)	July 6, 1970 (aged 31)	(Germany) Kassel Huskies
31	D	Andreas Renz	6 ft 0 in (183 cm)	207 lb (94 kg)	June 12, 1977 (aged 24)	(Germany) Kölner Haie
33	G	Marc Seliger	5 ft 11 in (180 cm)	168 lb (76 kg)	May 1, 1974 (aged 27)	(Germany) Nürnberg Ice Tigers
36	D	Erich Goldmann	6 ft 3 in (191 cm)	221 lb (100 kg)	April 7, 1976 (aged 25)	(Germany) Moskitos Essen
41	D	Daniel Kunce	6 ft 1 in (185 cm)	205 lb (93 kg)	July 17, 1971 (aged 30)	(Germany) Krefeld Pinguine
47	G	Christian Künast	5 ft 11 in (180 cm)	168 lb (76 kg)	March 7, 1971 (aged 30)	(Germany) München Barons
48	F	Len Soccio	5 ft 11 in (180 cm)	194 lb (88 kg)	May 28, 1967 (aged 34)	(Germany) Hannover Scorpions
49	F	Klaus Kathan	6 ft 0 in (183 cm)	187 lb (85 kg)	January 7, 1977 (aged 25)	(Germany) Kassel Huskies
75	F	Andreas Morczinietz	6 ft 1 in (185 cm)	190 lb (86 kg)	March 11, 1978 (aged 23)	(Germany) Augsburger Panther
80	G	Robert Müller	5 ft 8 in (173 cm)	187 lb (85 kg)	June 25, 1980 (aged 21)	(Germany) Adler Mannheim
81	F	Mark MacKay	5 ft 8 in (173 cm)	181 lb (82 kg)	May 28, 1964 (aged 37)	(Germany) SERC Wild Wings
83	F/D	Jan Benda	6 ft 2 in (188 cm)	218 lb (99 kg)	April 28, 1972 (aged 29)	(Russia) Ak Bars Kazan
84	D	Dennis Seidenberg	6 ft 0 in (183 cm)	198 lb (90 kg)	June 18, 1981 (aged 20)	(Germany) Adler Mannheim

== Latvia ==
Head coach: (Sweden) Curt Lindström

Assistant coach: Maris Baldonieks

No.	Pos.	Name	Height	Weight	Birthdate	Team
1	G	Artūrs Irbe	5 ft 9 in (175 cm)	190 lb (86 kg)	February 2, 1967 (aged 35)	(United States) Carolina Hurricanes
2	D	Rodrigo Laviņš	5 ft 11 in (180 cm)	185 lb (84 kg)	August 3, 1974 (aged 27)	(Russia) Molot-Prikamie Perm
3	D	Viktors Ignatjevs	6 ft 4 in (193 cm)	220 lb (100 kg)	August 26, 1970 (aged 31)	(Russia) Severstal Cherepovets
5	D	Igors Bondarevs	5 ft 11 in (180 cm)	194 lb (88 kg)	February 9, 1974 (aged 28)	(Finland) SaiPa
7	D	Kārlis Skrastiņš	6 ft 2 in (188 cm)	205 lb (93 kg)	July 9, 1974 (aged 27)	(United States) Nashville Predators
8	F	Vjačeslavs Fanduļs	5 ft 10 in (178 cm)	185 lb (84 kg)	March 17, 1969 (aged 32)	(Germany) Berlin Capitals
9	F	Aleksandrs Beļavskis	6 ft 0 in (183 cm)	187 lb (85 kg)	January 17, 1974 (aged 28)	(Sweden) IF Björklöven
11	F	Sergejs Seņins	5 ft 11 in (180 cm)	187 lb (85 kg)	April 16, 1972 (aged 29)	(Denmark) Herning Blue Fox
12	F	Aleksandrs Macijevskis	5 ft 10 in (178 cm)	185 lb (84 kg)	June 26, 1975 (aged 26)	(Denmark) Odense Bulldogs
13	F	Grigorijs Panteļejevs	5 ft 9 in (175 cm)	185 lb (84 kg)	November 13, 1972 (aged 29)	(Sweden) Södertälje SK
14	F	Leonids Tambijevs	5 ft 9 in (175 cm)	176 lb (80 kg)	September 26, 1970 (aged 31)	(Denmark) Rødvore
15	D	Kaspars Astašenko	6 ft 3 in (191 cm)	209 lb (95 kg)	February 7, 1975 (aged 27)	(United States) Lowell Lock Monsters
17	F	Aleksandrs Ņiživijs	5 ft 10 in (178 cm)	170 lb (77 kg)	September 16, 1976 (aged 25)	(Russia) Dynamo Moskva
18	D	Sandis Ozoliņš	6 ft 3 in (191 cm)	214 lb (97 kg)	August 3, 1972 (aged 29)	(United States) Florida Panthers
20	F	Harijs Vītoliņš (C)	6 ft 4 in (193 cm)	209 lb (95 kg)	August 30, 1968 (aged 33)	(Switzerland) HC Thurgau
21	F	Aleksandrs Kerčs	5 ft 10 in (178 cm)	187 lb (85 kg)	March 16, 1967 (aged 34)	(Germany) Berlin Capitals
22	D	Oļegs Sorokins	5 ft 10 in (178 cm)	190 lb (86 kg)	January 4, 1974 (aged 28)	(Russia) Molot-Prikamie Perm
23	D	Atvars Tribuncovs	6 ft 2 in (188 cm)	220 lb (100 kg)	October 14, 1974 (aged 27)	(Germany) Berlin Capitals
27	F	Aleksandrs Semjonovs	5 ft 11 in (180 cm)	201 lb (91 kg)	June 8, 1972 (aged 29)	(Sweden) IFK Arboga
28	D	Andrejs Maticins	5 ft 11 in (180 cm)	201 lb (91 kg)	January 30, 1963 (aged 39)	(Sweden) IK Nyköpings NH 90
29	F	Aigars Cipruss	5 ft 11 in (180 cm)	181 lb (82 kg)	January 12, 1972 (aged 30)	(Finland) HIFK
30	G	Sergejs Naumovs	5 ft 10 in (178 cm)	181 lb (82 kg)	August 4, 1969 (aged 32)	(Sweden) Djurgårdens IF
32	G	Edgars Masaļskis	5 ft 9 in (175 cm)	181 lb (82 kg)	March 30, 1981 (aged 20)	(Latvia) Metalurgs Liepājas

== Russia ==
Head coach: Viacheslav Fetisov

Assistant coaches: Vladislav Tretiak, Vladimir Yurzinov

No.	Pos.	Name	Height	Weight	Birthdate	2001–02 team
2	D	Boris Mironov	1.91 m (6 ft 3 in)	102 kg (225 lb)	21 March 1972	(United States) Chicago Blackhawks
5	D	Daniil Markov	1.84 m (6 ft 0 in)	86 kg (190 lb)	30 July 1976	(United States) Phoenix Coyotes
7	D	Oleg Tverdovsky	1.85 m (6 ft 1 in)	84 kg (185 lb)	18 May 1976	(United States) Mighty Ducks of Anaheim
8	F	Igor Larionov – C	1.76 m (5 ft 9 in)	77 kg (170 lb)	3 December 1960	(United States) Detroit Red Wings
10	F	Pavel Bure – A	1.78 m (5 ft 10 in)	86 kg (190 lb)	31 March 1971	(United States) Florida Panthers
11	D	Darius Kasparaitis – A	1.82 m (6 ft 0 in)	97 kg (214 lb)	16 October 1972	(United States) Pittsburgh Penguins
12	F	Oleg Kvasha	1.95 m (6 ft 5 in)	98 kg (216 lb)	26 July 1978	(United States) New York Islanders
13	F	Alexei Zhamnov	1.85 m (6 ft 1 in)	88 kg (194 lb)	1 October 1970	(United States) Chicago Blackhawks
14	F	Sergei Samsonov	1.76 m (5 ft 9 in)	83 kg (183 lb)	27 October 1978	(United States) Boston Bruins
20	F	Valeri Bure	1.78 m (5 ft 10 in)	84 kg (185 lb)	13 June 1974	(United States) Florida Panthers
23	D	Vladimir Malakhov	1.94 m (6 ft 4 in)	105 kg (231 lb)	30 August 1968	(United States) New York Rangers
26	F	Pavel Datsyuk	1.80 m (5 ft 11 in)	82 kg (181 lb)	20 July 1978	(United States) Detroit Red Wings
27	F	Alexei Kovalev	1.87 m (6 ft 2 in)	100 kg (220 lb)	24 February 1973	(United States) Pittsburgh Penguins
29	D	Igor Kravchuk	1.86 m (6 ft 1 in)	99 kg (218 lb)	13 September 1966	(Canada) Calgary Flames
30	G	Ilya Bryzgalov	1.91 m (6 ft 3 in)	91 kg (201 lb)	22 June 1980	(United States) Cincinnati Mighty Ducks
31	G	Yegor Podomatsky	1.76 m (5 ft 9 in)	76 kg (168 lb)	22 November 1976	(Russia) Lokomotiv Yaroslavl
33	F	Andrei Nikolishin	1.82 m (6 ft 0 in)	82 kg (181 lb)	25 March 1973	(United States) Washington Capitals
35	G	Nikolai Khabibulin	1.85 m (6 ft 1 in)	80 kg (176 lb)	13 January 1973	(United States) Tampa Bay Lightning
55	D	Sergei Gonchar	1.86 m (6 ft 1 in)	94 kg (207 lb)	13 April 1974	(United States) Washington Capitals
61	F	Maxim Afinogenov	1.80 m (5 ft 11 in)	80 kg (176 lb)	4 September 1979	(United States) Buffalo Sabres
71	F	Ilya Kovalchuk	1.85 m (6 ft 1 in)	86 kg (190 lb)	15 April 1983	(United States) Atlanta Thrashers
79	F	Alexei Yashin	1.92 m (6 ft 4 in)	99 kg (218 lb)	5 November 1973	(United States) New York Islanders
91	F	Sergei Fedorov	1.86 m (6 ft 1 in)	91 kg (201 lb)	13 December 1969	(United States) Detroit Red Wings

== Slovakia ==
Head coach: Ján Filc

Assistant coach: Ernest Bokroš, Vladimír Šťastný

No.	Pos.	Name	Height	Weight	Birthdate	Team
4	D	Peter Smrek	6 ft 0 in (183 cm)	214 lb (97 kg)	February 16, 1979 (aged 22)	(United States) Hartford Wolf Pack
5	D	Jaroslav Obšut	6 ft 1 in (185 cm)	209 lb (95 kg)	March 9, 1976 (aged 25)	(United States) Hershey Bears
11	D	Dušan Milo	5 ft 9 in (175 cm)	190 lb (86 kg)	March 5, 1973 (aged 28)	(Slovakia) HKM Zvolen
15	F	Jozef Stümpel	6 ft 3 in (191 cm)	218 lb (99 kg)	July 20, 1972 (aged 29)	(United States) Boston Bruins
17	D	Ľubomír Višňovský	5 ft 10 in (178 cm)	192 lb (87 kg)	August 11, 1976 (aged 25)	(United States) Los Angeles Kings
18	F	Miroslav Šatan	6 ft 2 in (188 cm)	194 lb (88 kg)	October 22, 1974 (aged 27)	(United States) Buffalo Sabres
19	F	Rastislav Pavlikovský	5 ft 11 in (180 cm)	198 lb (90 kg)	March 2, 1977 (aged 24)	(Sweden) HV71
22	D	Ivan Majeský	6 ft 5 in (196 cm)	240 lb (110 kg)	September 2, 1976 (aged 25)	(Finland) Ilves
23	F	Ľuboš Bartečko	6 ft 0 in (183 cm)	201 lb (91 kg)	July 14, 1976 (aged 25)	(United States) Atlanta Thrashers
24	F	Žigmund Pálffy	5 ft 10 in (178 cm)	183 lb (83 kg)	May 5, 1972 (aged 29)	(United States) Los Angeles Kings
24	F	Ján Pardavý	6 ft 0 in (183 cm)	209 lb (95 kg)	September 8, 1971 (aged 30)	(Sweden) Djurgårdens IF
25	G	Ján Lášak	6 ft 0 in (183 cm)	205 lb (93 kg)	April 10, 1979 (aged 22)	(United States) Milwaukee Admirals
26	F	Michal Handzuš	6 ft 5 in (196 cm)	216 lb (98 kg)	March 11, 1977 (aged 24)	(United States) Phoenix Coyotes
29	G	Pavol Rybár	5 ft 11 in (180 cm)	190 lb (86 kg)	October 12, 1971 (aged 30)	(Slovakia) HC Slovan Bratislava
30	F	Richard Kapuš	6 ft 0 in (183 cm)	203 lb (92 kg)	February 9, 1973 (aged 29)	(Slovakia) HC Slovan Bratislava
31	G	Rastislav Staňa	6 ft 1 in (185 cm)	198 lb (90 kg)	January 10, 1980 (aged 22)	(United States) Richmond Renegades
38	F	Pavol Demitra	6 ft 0 in (183 cm)	205 lb (93 kg)	November 29, 1974 (aged 27)	(United States) St. Louis Blues
39	F	Róbert Petrovický	5 ft 11 in (180 cm)	179 lb (81 kg)	October 26, 1973 (aged 28)	(Switzerland) HC Ambrì-Piotta
41	D	Richard Lintner	6 ft 3 in (191 cm)	214 lb (97 kg)	November 15, 1977 (aged 24)	(Sweden) MODO Hockey
42	F	Richard Šechný	6 ft 4 in (193 cm)	209 lb (95 kg)	October 19, 1971 (aged 30)	(Slovakia) HKM Zvolen
50	D	Richard Pavlikovský	5 ft 11 in (180 cm)	198 lb (90 kg)	March 3, 1975 (aged 26)	(Sweden) HV71
72	F	Jaroslav Török	6 ft 0 in (183 cm)	194 lb (88 kg)	December 1, 1971 (aged 30)	(Slovakia) HKM Zvolen
81	F	Marián Hossa	6 ft 2 in (188 cm)	207 lb (94 kg)	January 12, 1979 (aged 23)	(Canada) Ottawa Senators

== Sweden ==
Head coach: Hardy Nilsson

Assistant coach: Mats Waltin

No.	Pos.	Name	Height	Weight	Birthdate	Team
1	G	Johan Hedberg	6 ft 0 in (183 cm)	190 lb (86 kg)	May 5, 1973 (aged 28)	(United States) Pittsburgh Penguins
2	D	Mattias Öhlund	6 ft 4 in (193 cm)	234 lb (106 kg)	September 9, 1976 (aged 25)	(Canada) Vancouver Canucks
3	D	Kim Johnsson	6 ft 1 in (185 cm)	205 lb (93 kg)	March 16, 1976 (aged 25)	(United States) Philadelphia Flyers
4	D	Fredrik Olausson	6 ft 1 in (185 cm)	198 lb (90 kg)	October 5, 1966 (aged 35)	(United States) Detroit Red Wings
5	D	Nicklas Lidström (A)	6 ft 1 in (185 cm)	190 lb (86 kg)	April 28, 1970 (aged 31)	(United States) Detroit Red Wings
9	F	Ulf Dahlén	6 ft 2 in (188 cm)	198 lb (90 kg)	January 21, 1967 (aged 35)	(United States) Washington Capitals
10	D	Marcus Ragnarsson	6 ft 1 in (185 cm)	216 lb (98 kg)	August 13, 1971 (aged 30)	(United States) San Jose Sharks
11	F	Daniel Alfredsson	6 ft 0 in (183 cm)	203 lb (92 kg)	December 11, 1972 (aged 29)	(Canada) Ottawa Senators
12	F	P.J. Axelsson	6 ft 1 in (185 cm)	187 lb (85 kg)	February 26, 1975 (aged 26)	(United States) Boston Bruins
13	F	Mats Sundin (C)	6 ft 5 in (196 cm)	231 lb (105 kg)	February 13, 1971 (aged 30)	(Canada) Toronto Maple Leafs
14	D	Mattias Norström	6 ft 1 in (185 cm)	223 lb (101 kg)	January 2, 1972 (aged 30)	(United States) Los Angeles Kings
17	F	Mathias Johansson	6 ft 2 in (188 cm)	201 lb (91 kg)	February 22, 1974 (aged 27)	(Sweden) Färjestad BK
19	F	Mikael Renberg	6 ft 2 in (188 cm)	236 lb (107 kg)	May 5, 1972 (aged 29)	(Canada) Toronto Maple Leafs
20	F	Magnus Arvedson	6 ft 2 in (188 cm)	198 lb (90 kg)	November 25, 1971 (aged 30)	(Canada) Ottawa Senators
24	F	Niklas Sundström	6 ft 0 in (183 cm)	194 lb (88 kg)	June 6, 1975 (aged 26)	(United States) San Jose Sharks
29	D	Kenny Jönsson	6 ft 3 in (191 cm)	207 lb (94 kg)	October 6, 1974 (aged 27)	(United States) New York Islanders
32	G	Mikael Tellqvist	5 ft 11 in (180 cm)	190 lb (86 kg)	October 19, 1979 (aged 22)	(Canada) St. John's Maple Leafs
35	G	Tommy Salo	6 ft 0 in (183 cm)	179 lb (81 kg)	February 1, 1971 (aged 31)	(Canada) Edmonton Oilers
40	F	Henrik Zetterberg	6 ft 0 in (183 cm)	196 lb (89 kg)	October 9, 1980 (aged 21)	(Sweden) Timrå IK
42	F	Jörgen Jönsson	6 ft 0 in (183 cm)	192 lb (87 kg)	September 29, 1972 (aged 29)	(Sweden) Färjestad BK
91	F	Markus Näslund	6 ft 0 in (183 cm)	196 lb (89 kg)	July 30, 1973 (aged 28)	(Canada) Vancouver Canucks
92	F	Michael Nylander	5 ft 11 in (180 cm)	192 lb (87 kg)	October 3, 1972 (aged 29)	(United States) Chicago Blackhawks
96	F	Tomas Holmström	6 ft 0 in (183 cm)	198 lb (90 kg)	January 23, 1973 (aged 29)	(United States) Detroit Red Wings

== Switzerland ==
Head coach: (Canada) / (Germany) Ralph Krueger

Assistant coach: (Sweden) Bengt-Åke Gustafsson, Jakob Kölliker

No.	Pos.	Name	Height	Weight	Birthdate	Team
3	D	Julien Vauclair	6 ft 0 in (183 cm)	203 lb (92 kg)	October 2, 1979 (aged 22)	(United States) Grand Rapids Griffins
4	F	Flavien Conne	5 ft 10 in (178 cm)	179 lb (81 kg)	April 10, 1980 (aged 21)	(Switzerland) HC Lugano
5	D	Patrick Sutter (A)	5 ft 9 in (175 cm)	172 lb (78 kg)	July 6, 1970 (aged 31)	(Switzerland) HC Lugano
7	D	Mark Streit (C)	5 ft 11 in (180 cm)	192 lb (87 kg)	December 11, 1977 (aged 24)	(Switzerland) ZSC Lions
10	D	Martin Höhener	6 ft 1 in (185 cm)	192 lb (87 kg)	June 23, 1980 (aged 21)	(Switzerland) Kloten Flyers
11	D	Martin Steinegger	6 ft 2 in (188 cm)	203 lb (92 kg)	February 15, 1972 (aged 29)	(Switzerland) SC Bern
12	F	Patric Della Rossa	6 ft 2 in (188 cm)	203 lb (92 kg)	July 28, 1975 (aged 26)	(Switzerland) ZSC Lions
15	F	Reto von Arx	5 ft 11 in (180 cm)	190 lb (86 kg)	October 13, 1976 (aged 25)	(Switzerland) HC Davos
17	F/D	Gian-Marco Crameri	5 ft 10 in (178 cm)	170 lb (77 kg)	December 13, 1972 (aged 29)	(Switzerland) ZSC Lions
18	F	André Rötheli	6 ft 1 in (185 cm)	203 lb (92 kg)	October 12, 1970 (aged 31)	(Switzerland) HC Lugano
19	F	Jean-Jacques Aeschlimann	6 ft 1 in (185 cm)	190 lb (86 kg)	May 30, 1967 (aged 34)	(Switzerland) HC Lugano
21	F	Patrick Fishcer	5 ft 11 in (180 cm)	187 lb (85 kg)	October 6, 1975 (aged 26)	(Switzerland) HC Davos
22	D	Olivier Keller	6 ft 2 in (188 cm)	207 lb (94 kg)	March 20, 1971 (aged 30)	(Switzerland) HC Lugano
26	G	Martin Gerber	5 ft 11 in (180 cm)	207 lb (94 kg)	October 3, 1974 (aged 27)	(Sweden) Färjestad BK
27	D	Edgar Salis	6 ft 2 in (188 cm)	207 lb (94 kg)	May 20, 1970 (aged 31)	(Switzerland) ZSC Lions
28	F	Martin Plüss (A)	5 ft 9 in (175 cm)	170 lb (77 kg)	April 5, 1977 (aged 24)	(Switzerland) Kloten Flyers
30	F	Marcel Jenni	5 ft 11 in (180 cm)	194 lb (88 kg)	March 2, 1974 (aged 27)	(Sweden) Färjestad BK
31	D	Mathias Seger	5 ft 11 in (180 cm)	190 lb (86 kg)	December 17, 1977 (aged 24)	(Switzerland) ZSC Lions
32	F	Ivo Rüthemann	5 ft 8 in (173 cm)	174 lb (79 kg)	December 12, 1976 (aged 25)	(Switzerland) SC Bern
35	F	Sandy Jeannin	5 ft 11 in (180 cm)	183 lb (83 kg)	February 28, 1976 (aged 25)	(Switzerland) HC Lugano
37	F	Björn Christen	6 ft 0 in (183 cm)	203 lb (92 kg)	April 5, 1980 (aged 21)	(Switzerland) HC Davos
40	G	David Aebischer	6 ft 1 in (185 cm)	187 lb (85 kg)	February 7, 1978 (aged 24)	(United States) Colorado Avalanche
41	G	Lars Weibel	6 ft 1 in (185 cm)	190 lb (86 kg)	May 20, 1974 (aged 27)	(Switzerland) HC Davos

== Ukraine ==
Head coach: Anatoli Bogdanov

Assistant coach: Oleksandr Seukand

No.	Pos.	Name	Height	Weight	Birthdate	Team
1	G	Konstantin Simchuk	6 ft 0 in (183 cm)	174 lb (79 kg)	February 26, 1974 (aged 27)	(Russia) Spartak Moskva
2	D	Yuri Gunko	6 ft 3 in (191 cm)	207 lb (94 kg)	February 26, 1972 (aged 29)	(Russia) HK CSKA Moskva
3	D	Sergei Klimentyev	6 ft 3 in (191 cm)	198 lb (90 kg)	April 5, 1975 (aged 26)	(Russia) Metallurg Magnitogorsk
6	D	Andri Sriubko	6 ft 3 in (191 cm)	212 lb (96 kg)	October 21, 1975 (aged 26)	(United States) Syracuse Crunch
7	F	Vasili Bobrovnikov	5 ft 9 in (175 cm)	174 lb (79 kg)	November 8, 1971 (aged 30)	(Ukraine) Sokil Kyiv
8	F	Dmitri Khristich	6 ft 1 in (185 cm)	207 lb (94 kg)	July 23, 1969 (aged 32)	(United States) Washington Capitals
9	F	Vadim Slivchenko	5 ft 10 in (178 cm)	190 lb (86 kg)	March 28, 1970 (aged 31)	(Germany) Frankfurt Lions
10	F	Vadim Shakraichuk (A)	6 ft 3 in (191 cm)	214 lb (97 kg)	June 12, 1974 (aged 27)	(Russia) Lokomotiv Yaroslavl
11	F	Ruslan Fedotenko	6 ft 1 in (185 cm)	209 lb (95 kg)	January 8, 1979 (aged 23)	(United States) Philadelphia Flyers
12	D	Dmytro Tolkunov	6 ft 3 in (191 cm)	203 lb (92 kg)	May 27, 1979 (aged 22)	(United States) Norfolk Admirals
14	D	Valeri Shiryayev	5 ft 10 in (178 cm)	187 lb (85 kg)	August 26, 1963 (aged 38)	(Switzerland) HC La Chaux-de-Fonds
15	F	Vitali Litvinenko	6 ft 0 in (183 cm)	194 lb (88 kg)	March 14, 1970 (aged 31)	(Russia) Lada Togliatti
16	F	Igor Chibirev	6 ft 0 in (183 cm)	176 lb (80 kg)	April 19, 1968 (aged 33)	(Germany) Hannover Scorpions
17	F	Sergei Varlamov	5 ft 11 in (180 cm)	203 lb (92 kg)	July 21, 1978 (aged 23)	(United States) St. Louis Blues
20	G	Igor Karpenko	5 ft 8 in (173 cm)	187 lb (85 kg)	July 23, 1976 (aged 25)	(Russia) Metallurg Magnitogorsk
21	F	Valentin Oletski	5 ft 9 in (175 cm)	183 lb (83 kg)	June 2, 1971 (aged 30)	(Germany) EV Füssen
22	G	Olexander Fyodorov	6 ft 0 in (183 cm)	192 lb (87 kg)	April 12, 1978 (aged 23)	(Ukraine) Berkut Kyiv
23	F	Roman Salnikov	6 ft 0 in (183 cm)	209 lb (95 kg)	February 18, 1976 (aged 25)	(Russia) Krylia Sovetov Moskva
24	F	Vladislav Serov	5 ft 8 in (173 cm)	183 lb (83 kg)	June 14, 1978 (aged 23)	(United States) Greensboro Generals
25	F	Bogdan Savenko	6 ft 2 in (188 cm)	205 lb (93 kg)	November 20, 1974 (aged 27)	(Russia) Spartak Moskva
26	F	Alexei Ponikarovsky	6 ft 4 in (193 cm)	227 lb (103 kg)	April 9, 1980 (aged 21)	(Canada) St. John's Maple Leafs
29	D	Vyacheslav Timchenko	5 ft 11 in (180 cm)	190 lb (86 kg)	August 16, 1971 (aged 30)	(Germany) ES Weißwasser
30	D	Vyacheslav Zavalnyuk	6 ft 0 in (183 cm)	198 lb (90 kg)	December 10, 1974 (aged 27)	(Russia) SKA St. Petersburg

== United States ==
Head coach: Herb Brooks

Assistant coach: John Cunniff, Lou Vairo

No.	Pos.	Name	Height	Weight	Birthdate	Team
1	G	Mike Dunham	6 ft 2 in (188 cm)	201 lb (91 kg)	June 1, 1972 (aged 29)	(United States) Nashville Predators
2	D	Brian Leetch (A)	6 ft 1 in (185 cm)	187 lb (85 kg)	March 3, 1968 (aged 33)	(United States) New York Rangers
33	D	Aaron Miller	6 ft 3 in (191 cm)	209 lb (95 kg)	August 11, 1971 (aged 30)	(United States) Los Angeles Kings
5	D	Tom Poti	6 ft 3 in (191 cm)	209 lb (95 kg)	March 22, 1977 (aged 24)	(Canada) Edmonton Oilers
6	D	Phil Housley (A)	5 ft 10 in (178 cm)	179 lb (81 kg)	March 9, 1964 (aged 37)	(United States) Chicago Blackhawks
7	F	Keith Tkachuk	6 ft 2 in (188 cm)	235 lb (107 kg)	March 28, 1972 (aged 29)	(United States) St. Louis Blues
9	F	Mike Modano	6 ft 3 in (191 cm)	210 lb (95 kg)	June 7, 1970 (aged 31)	(United States) Dallas Stars
10	F	John LeClair	6 ft 3 in (191 cm)	225 lb (102 kg)	July 5, 1969 (aged 32)	(United States) Philadelphia Flyers
11	F	Tony Amonte	6 ft 0 in (183 cm)	202 lb (92 kg)	August 2, 1970 (aged 31)	(United States) Chicago Blackhawks
12	F	Brian Rolston	6 ft 2 in (188 cm)	214 lb (97 kg)	February 21, 1973 (aged 28)	(United States) Boston Bruins
13	F	Bill Guerin	6 ft 2 in (188 cm)	220 lb (100 kg)	November 9, 1970 (aged 31)	(United States) Boston Bruins
16	F	Brett Hull	5 ft 11 in (180 cm)	201 lb (91 kg)	August 9, 1964 (aged 37)	(United States) Detroit Red Wings
18	F	Adam Deadmarsh	6 ft 0 in (183 cm)	205 lb (93 kg)	May 10, 1975 (aged 26)	(United States) Los Angeles Kings
20	D	Gary Suter	6 ft 0 in (183 cm)	205 lb (93 kg)	June 24, 1964 (aged 37)	(United States) San Jose Sharks
24	D	Chris Chelios (C)	5 ft 11 in (180 cm)	191 lb (87 kg)	January 25, 1962 (aged 40)	(United States) Detroit Red Wings
3	D	Brian Rafalski	5 ft 10 in (178 cm)	192 lb (87 kg)	September 28, 1973 (aged 28)	(United States) New Jersey Devils
30	G	Tom Barrasso	6 ft 3 in (191 cm)	209 lb (95 kg)	March 31, 1965 (aged 36)	(United States) Carolina Hurricanes
35	G	Mike Richter	5 ft 11 in (180 cm)	185 lb (84 kg)	September 22, 1966 (aged 35)	(United States) New York Rangers
37	F	Chris Drury	5 ft 10 in (178 cm)	190 lb (86 kg)	August 20, 1976 (aged 25)	(United States) Colorado Avalanche
39	F	Doug Weight	5 ft 11 in (180 cm)	196 lb (89 kg)	January 21, 1971 (aged 31)	(United States) St. Louis Blues
48	F	Scott Young	6 ft 1 in (185 cm)	201 lb (91 kg)	October 1, 1967 (aged 34)	(United States) St. Louis Blues
61	F	Mike York	5 ft 10 in (178 cm)	183 lb (83 kg)	January 3, 1978 (aged 24)	(United States) New York Rangers
97	F	Jeremy Roenick	6 ft 1 in (185 cm)	205 lb (93 kg)	January 17, 1970 (aged 32)	(United States) Philadelphia Flyers
