= Ice hockey at the 2006 Winter Olympics – Men's qualification =

Qualification for the men's tournament at the 2006 Winter Olympics was determined through the IIHF World Ranking following the 2004 Men's World Ice Hockey Championships. The top eight teams in the World Ranking received automatic berths into the Olympics, Italy received a berth as the host, while all other teams had an opportunity to qualify for the remaining three spots in the Olympics through qualifying tournaments.

== Qualified teams ==
Event	Date	Location	Vacancies	Qualified
2004 IIHF World Ranking	26 March 2001 – 9 May 2004	(Czech Republic) Prague and Ostrava	8	Canada; Sweden; Slovakia; Czech Republic; Finland; United States; Russia; Germany
Final qualification tournament	10–13 February 2005	(Switzerland) Kloten	1	Switzerland
Final qualification tournament	10–13 February 2005	(Latvia) Riga	1	Latvia
Final qualification tournament	10–13 February 2005	(Austria) Klagenfurt	1	Kazakhstan
Host			1	Italy
TOTAL			12	

Notes

1. ^{a} 2004 IIHF World Ranking were comprising the following events: 2001 World Championship, 2002 Winter Olympic Games, 2002 World Championship, 2003 World Championship and 2004 World Championship
2. ^{b} Prague and Ostrava were the sites for 2004 IIHF World Championship; at the conclusion of the tournament the ranking were finalized with regards to the qualification slots.

== Qualification seeding ==
Qualified directly to Olympic Tournament
Final qualification tournament
Pre-qualification tournament

Qualifying seed	Team	WC 2004 (100%)	WC 2003 (75%)	WC 2002 (50%)	OLY 2002 (50%)	WC 2001 (25%)	Total
1	Canada	1200	1200	1040	1200	1060	3485
2	Sweden	1160	1160	1120	1060	1120	3400
3	Slovakia	1100	1120	1200	880	1020	3235
4	Czech Republic	1060	1100	1060	1020	1200	3225
5	Finland	1040	1060	1100	1040	1160	3195
6	United States	1120	880	1020	1160	1100	3145
7	Russia	940	1020	1160	1120	1040	3105
8	Germany	960	1040	1000	1000	1000	2990
9	Switzerland	1000	1000	940	920	960	2920
10	Latvia	1020	960	920	960	880	2900
11	Austria	920	940	900	900	920	2755
12	Ukraine	860	900	960	940	940	2720
13	Belarus	780	860	800	1100	860	2590
14	Denmark	900	920	780	840	700	2575
15	Japan	840	820	820	740	820	2440
16	Slovenia	800	840	880	700	800	2420
17	Kazakhstan	880	800	720	780	720	2410
18	France	820	780	760	860	740	2400
Host	Italy	760	680	840	800	900	2315
19	Poland	720	760	860	760	780	2295
20	Norway	740	740	700	820	840	2265
21	Hungary	660	720	740	640	680	2060
22	Netherlands	700	660	660	660	640	2015
23	Estonia	680	700	560	720	600	1995
	Great Britain	640	640	680	680	760	1990
24	Romania	620	620	640	600	560	1845
25	Lithuania	560	580	540	620	580	1720
26	China	540	500	580	540	620	1630
27	Serbia and Montenegro	520	520	500	580	460	1565
	South Korea	600	560	600	0	540	1455
28	Croatia	500	600	620		660	1425
29	Bulgaria	420	460	440	560	440	1375
	Belgium	580	540	520		400	1345
	Spain	440	480	480		520	1170
	Australia	480	420	420		480	1125
	Israel	380	400	460		500	1035
	North Korea	460	440	320			950
	South Africa	340	380	400		420	930
	Iceland	320	360	380		380	875
	New Zealand	400	320	280		360	870
	Mexico	280	340	300		340	770
	Luxembourg	360	300	340			755
	Turkey	300	280	360			690
	Ireland	260					260
	Armenia	240					240

- Great Britain and South Korea chose not to participate in Olympic qualifying.

== Olympic pre-qualification tournaments ==
Three round-robins were played from 11 to 14 November 2004. The teams seeded 18th, 19th, and 20th reserved the right to host these tournaments. The winners of each advanced to the final qualification tournaments.

=== Group D ===
Games were played in Briançon, France.

Pos	Team	Pld	W	D	L	GF	GA	GD	Pts	Qualification
1	France (H)	3	3	0	0	30	0	+30	6	Final qualification tournament
2	Romania	3	2	0	1	10	12	−2	4	
3	Estonia	3	1	0	2	14	12	+2	2	
4	Bulgaria	3	0	0	3	2	32	−30	0	

Source: IIHF.com
(H) Hosts

11 November 2004; 16:30	Estonia	11–1 (3–0, 2–0, 6–1)	Bulgaria	Patinoire René Froger, Briançon; Attendance: 1,052

Game reference

Aleksei Terentjev
Andrei Sestakov
Goalies
Ivaylo Asenov
Konstantin Mihailov
Referee:
Luca Cassol
Linesmen:
Matjaz Hribar
Enis Beganovic

Petrov – 03:56	1–0
Kaljuste (Tulzakov, Titarenko) (PP) – 07:29	2–0
Titarenko – 14:21	3–0
Konosev (Valk) – 23:10	4–0
Konosev (Valk, Palu) – 27:45	5–0
Makrov (Ossipenkov, Kolpakov) – 40:48	6–0
Palu (Konosev, Valk) – 41:31	7–0
Zorin (Potsinok, Ivanov) – 41:57	8–0
	8–1	42:36 – Polizoev (Terziev)
Kaljuste (Valk, Ossipenkov) – 52:59	9–1
Potsinok (Ivanov, Sauendi) (PP) – 55:08	10–1
Kozlov (Zorin, Potsinok) – 59:29	11–1

6 min
Penalties
6 min
66
Shots
8

11 November 2004; 20:30	Romania	0–8 (0–2, 0–2, 0–4)	France	Patinoire René Froger, Briançon; Attendance: 2,007

Game reference

Viorel Catrinoi
Goalies
Cristobal Huet
Referee:
Christian Wohlgenannt
Linesmen:
Michele Gastaldelli
Erich Maier

0–1	06:40 – Meunier (Bess)
0–2	18:28 – Gras (Bonnard)
0–3	21:40 – F. Rozenthal (M. Rozenthal)
0–4	33:38 – Coqueux (Dostal, Daramy)
0–5	55:39 – Besse (Huet)
0–6	57:44 – Karrer (Bellemare, Bonnard) (PP)
0–7	59:13 – F. Rozenthal (M. Rozenthal, Zwikel) (PP)
0–8	59:41 – Dostal (Daramy, Coqueux)

14 min
Penalties
10 min
19
Shots
47

13 November 2004; 16:30	Estonia	3–4 (2–0, 0–4, 1–0)	Romania	Patinoire René Froger, Briançon; Attendance: 884

Game reference
59 min	Penalties	51 min
39	Shots	29

13 November 2004; 20:30	France	15–0 (5–0, 4–0, 6–0)	Bulgaria	Patinoire René Froger, Briançon; Attendance: 1,916

Game reference
4 min	Penalties	4 min
82	Shots	2

14 November 2004; 15:30	Bulgaria	1–6 (0–3, 0–2, 1–1)	Romania	Patinoire René Froger, Briançon; Attendance: 532

Game reference
14 min	Penalties	18 min
21	Shots	35

14 November 2004; 19:30	France	7–0 (3–0, 2–0, 2–0)	Estonia	Patinoire René Froger, Briançon; Attendance: 2,122

Game reference
34 min	Penalties	59 min
56	Shots	21

=== Group E ===
Games were played in Nowy Targ, Poland.

Pos	Team	Pld	W	D	L	GF	GA	GD	Pts	Qualification
1	Poland (H)	3	3	0	0	18	1	+17	6	Final qualification tournament
2	Netherlands	3	2	0	1	13	9	+4	4	
3	Lithuania	3	1	0	2	8	13	−5	2	
4	Croatia	3	0	0	3	7	23	−16	0	

Source: IIHF.com
(H) Hosts

11 November 2004; 16:00	Netherlands	10–3 (3–0, 3–1, 4–2)	Croatia	Miejska Hala Lodowa, Nowy Targ; Attendance: 400

Game reference
8 min	Penalties	6 min
47	Shots	36

11 November 2004; 19:30	Lithuania	1–6 (0–2, 1–2, 0–2)	Poland	Miejska Hala Lodowa, Nowy Targ; Attendance: 4,000

Game reference
14 min	Penalties	10 min
24	Shots	52

13 November 2004; 16:00	Netherlands	3–1 (1–1, 2–0, 0–0)	Lithuania	Miejska Hala Lodowa, Nowy Targ

13 November 2004; 19:30	Poland	7–0 (3–0, 3–0, 1–0)	Croatia	Miejska Hala Lodowa, Nowy Targ; Attendance: 1,800

Game reference
10 min	Penalties	12 min
66	Shots	16

14 November 2004; 15:00	Poland	5–0 (2–0, 2–0, 1–0)	Netherlands	Miejska Hala Lodowa, Nowy Targ; Attendance: 4,500

Game reference
10 min	Penalties	12 min
45	Shots	28

14 November 2004; 18:30	Croatia	4–6 (1–1, 2–2, 1–3)	Lithuania	Miejska Hala Lodowa, Nowy Targ

Game reference

=== Group F ===
Games were played in Stavanger, Norway.

Pos	Team	Pld	W	D	L	GF	GA	GD	Pts	Qualification
1	Norway (H)	3	2	1	0	40	5	+35	5	Final qualification tournament
2	Hungary	3	2	1	0	20	6	+14	5	
3	China	3	1	0	2	8	22	−14	2	
4	Serbia and Montenegro	3	0	0	3	2	37	−35	0	

Source: IIHF.com
(H) Hosts

11 November 2004; 15:00	Hungary	13–0 (2–0, 7–0, 4–0)	Serbia and Montenegro	Stavanger Ishall, Stavanger; Attendance: 547

Game reference
6 min	Penalties	8 min
68	Shots	8

11 November 2004; 18:30	China	2–16 (2–1, 0–5, 0–10)	Norway	Stavanger Ishall, Stavanger; Attendance: 960

Game reference
40 min	Penalties	14 min
12	Shots	101

12 November 2004; 15:00	Hungary	4–3 (2–1, 1–2, 1–0)	China	Stavanger Ishall, Stavanger; Attendance: 555

Game reference
18 min	Penalties	16 min
46	Shots	17

12 November 2004; 18:30	Norway	21–0 (4–0, 7–0, 10–0)	Serbia and Montenegro	Stavanger Ishall, Stavanger; Attendance: 901

Game reference
6 min	Penalties	12 min
90	Shots	4

14 November 2004; 13:00	Serbia and Montenegro	2–3 (1–1, 1–1, 0–1)	China	Stavanger Ishall, Stavanger; Attendance: 577

Game reference
10 min	Penalties	14 min
25	Shots	42

14 November 2004; 17:00	Norway	3–3 (1–0, 1–2, 1–1)	Hungary	Stavanger Ishall, Stavanger

Game reference
8 min	Penalties	30 min
39	Shots	14

== Final qualification tournaments ==
Three round-robins were played from 10 to 13 February 2005. The teams seeded 9th, 10th and 11th reserved the right to host these tournaments. The three group winners qualified for the Olympic tournament.

=== Group A ===
Games were played in Kloten, Switzerland.

Pos	Team	Pld	W	D	L	GF	GA	GD	Pts	Qualification
1	Switzerland (H)	3	3	0	0	12	4	+8	6	2006 Winter Olympics
2	Norway	3	2	0	1	9	6	+3	4	
3	Denmark	3	1	0	2	7	10	−3	2	
4	Japan	3	0	0	3	6	14	−8	0	

Source: IIHF.com
(H) Hosts

10 February 2005; 16:15	Denmark	0–4 (0–3, 0–1, 0–0)	Norway	Schlüfweg, Kloten; Attendance: 503

Game reference

Peter Hirsch
Goalies
Pål Grotnes
Referee:
Nicolas Dutil
Linesmen:
Stanislav Barvir
Paul Rebillard

0–1	05:21 – Vikingstad (Trygg) (SH)
0–2	07:47 – Skrøder (Myrvold) (PP)
0–3	17:05 – Bastiansen (Trygg, Knold) (PP)
0–4	34:32 – Myrvold (Ask, Jakobsen) (PP)

20 min
Penalties
24 min
28
Shots
24

10 February 2005; 20:15	Japan	1–5 (0–2, 0–2, 1–1)	Switzerland	Schlüfweg, Kloten; Attendance: 2,269

Game reference

Masahito Haruna
Goalies
Martin Gerber
Referee:
Wilhelm Schimm
Linesmen:
Pavel Makarov
Stefan Zantop

	0–1	00:33 – Jenni (Conne, Streit)
	0–2	09:00 – Ambühl (Reichert)
	0–3	38:13 – Forster (Conne, Jenni) (SH)
	0–4	39:09 – Ziegler (Rüthemann)
Suzuki (Ito, Haruna) (PP) – 50:38	1–4
	1–5	51:53 – Vauclair (Jenni, Conne)

16 min
Penalties
16 min
10
Shots
54

12 February 2005; 12:00	Denmark	5–2 (2–1, 1–0, 2–1)	Japan	Schlüfweg, Kloten; Attendance: 551

Game reference

Michael Madsen
Goalies
Masahito Haruna

F. Nielsen (Hansen) – 00:25	1–0
Andreasen (F. Nielsen, D. Nielsen) (PP) – 12:41	2–0
	2–1	14:27 – Fujita (SH)
Damgaard (F. Nielsen) (PP) – 37:40	3–1
	3–2	43:54 – Yule (Fujita)
Regin (F. Nielsen) – 55:15	4–2
True (ENG) – 59:46	5–2

16 min
Penalties
14 min
37
Shots
33

12 February 2005; 15:45	Switzerland	3–1 (1–1, 1–0, 1–0)	Norway	Schlüfweg, Kloten; Attendance: 4,051

Game reference

Martin Gerber
Goalies
Pål Grotnes
Referee:
Alexander Poliakov
Linesmen:
Stanislav Barvir
Milan Masik

Forster (Jeannin) – 01:41	1–0
	1–1	08:10 – Trygg (Vikingstad)
Zieglar (Reichert, Blindenbacher) – 38:53	2–1
Lemm – 43:05	3–1

28 min
Penalties
20 min
32
Shots
20

13 February 2005; 12:00	Norway	4–3 (0–2, 2–0, 2–1)	Japan	Schlüfweg, Kloten; Attendance: 431

Game reference

Pål Grotnes
Goalies
Naoya Kikuchi
Referee:
Alexander Poliakov
Linesmen:
Milan Masik
Paul Rebillard

	0–1	03:18 – Yule (Fujita, Keller)
	0–2	07:29 – Kon (Suzuki, Ito) (PP)
Olsen (Vikingstad, Thoresen) (PP) – 21:12	1–2
Marthinsen (Hallem, Nagel) – 22:13	2–2
Skrøder (Ask) – 42:44	3–2
	3–3	49:38 – Uchiyama (Keller, Okuyama)
Skrøder (Myrvold, Jakobsen) (PP) – 51:57	4–3

16 min
Penalties
18 min
42
Shots
26

13 February 2005; 15:45	Switzerland	4–2 (1–0, 2–2, 1–0)	Denmark	Schlüfweg, Kloten; Attendance: 3,371

Game reference

Martin Gerber
Goalies
Peter Hirsch
Referee:
Nicolas Dutil
Linesmen:
Pavel Makarov
Stefan Zantop

Fischer (Blindenbacher, Wichser) (PP) – 07:34	1–0
	1–1	20:30 – F. Nielsen (Regin)
Rüthemann (Streit, Gerber) (PP) – 33:06	2–1
	2–2	33:20 – Damgaard
Streit (Ruthemann) (PP2) – 38:07	3–2
Della Rossa (Seger) – 49:01	4–2

14 min
Penalties
20 min
49
Shots
22

=== Group B ===
Games were played in Riga, Latvia.

Pos	Team	Pld	W	D	L	GF	GA	GD	Pts	Qualification
1	Latvia (H)	3	3	0	0	10	6	+4	6	2006 Winter Olympics
2	Belarus	3	2	0	1	14	9	+5	4	
3	Slovenia	3	1	0	2	7	12	−5	2	
4	Poland	3	0	0	3	6	10	−4	0	

Source: IIHF.com
(H) Hosts

10 February 2005; 15:30	Belarus	3–2 (2–0, 0–1, 1–1)	Poland	Rigas Sporta Pils, Riga; Attendance: 1,000

Game reference

Sergei Shabanov
Goalies
Tomasz Jaworski
Referee:
Christer Larking
Linesmen:
Ansis Eglitis
Oleksangr Govorun

Mialeshka (Chuprys) – 05:21	1–0
Salei (Antonenko, Kalyuzhny) (PP2) – 14:30	2–0
	2–1	20:49 – Czerkawski (Szczepaniec)
	2–2	52:21 – Garbocz (Czerkawski) (PP)
Antonenko (Kalyuzhny) – 54:10	3–2

12 min
Penalties
12 min
44
Shots
19

10 February 2005; 19:00	Slovenia	1–2 (1–0, 0–2, 0–0)	Latvia	Rigas Sporta Pils, Riga; Attendance: 4,900

Game reference

Robert Kristan
Goalies
Sergejs Naumovs
Referee:
Frank Awizus
Linesmen:
Konstantin Gordenko
Ronni Jakobsen

Goličič – 15:33	1–0
	1–1	20:14 – Skrastiņš (Tambijevs) (PP)
	1–2	26:18 – Sprukts (Sējējs, Cipulis)

10 min
Penalties
10 min
34
Shots
33

11 February 2005; 15:30	Belarus	7–2 (0–1, 4–1, 3–0)	Slovenia	Rigas Sporta Pils, Riga; Attendance: 1,952

Game reference

Sergei Shabanov
Goalies
Robert Kristan
Referee:
Christer Larking
Linesmen:
Ansis Elitis
Ronni Jakobsen

	0–1	01:38 – Jan (Kontrec, Kopitar)
Grabovski (PP) – 21:56	1–1
Antonenko (Grabovski, Galchenyuk) – 24:25	2–1
	2–2	26:50 – Jan (Dervarič) (PP)
Bashko – 29:05	3–2
Grabovski (Kostyuchenok) – 39:45	4–2
Grabovski (Kostyuchenok) – 48:28	5–2
Krutsikau (Khyml, Stas) – 48:58	6–2
Krutsikau (Chuprys) – 54:23	7–2

12 min
Penalties
14 min
31
Shots
23

11 February 2005; 19:00	Latvia	3–1 (0–0, 1–1, 2–0)	Poland	Rigas Sporta Pils, Riga; Attendance: 4,700

Game reference

Edgars Masaļskis
Goalies
Tomasz Jaworski
Referee:
Timo Favorin
Linesmen:
Oleksangr
Seppo Lindroos

	0–1	38:36 – Czerkawski (Zamojski)
Panteļejevs (Ņiživijs) – 38:52	1–1
Semjonovs (Nizivijs, Ankipāns) – 51:50	2–1
Cipulis – 58:22	3–1

6 min
Penalties
20 min
37
Shots
37

13 February 2005; 13:00	Poland	3–4 (0–1, 1–1, 2–2)	Slovenia	Rigas Sporta Pils, Riga; Attendance: 970

Game reference

Tomasz Jaworski
Goalies
Gaber Glavič
Referee:
Timo Favorin
Linesmen:
Ansis Eglitis
Seppo Lindroos

	0–1	01:17 – Avgustinčič (Kontrec)
	0–2	22:02 – Goličič (Rožič)
Dulęba (Parzyszek) (PP)	1–2
	1–3	42:10 – Goličič (Vidmar)
	1–4	50:54 – Kopitar (M. Rodman) (PP)
55:56 – Szczepaniec (Zamojski, Płachta) (PP)	2–4
56:41 – Płachta (Szczepaniec)	3–4

22 min
Penalties
12 min
41
Shots
38

13 February 2005; 17:00	Latvia	5–4 (1–2, 1–1, 3–1)	Belarus	Rigas Sporta Pils, Riga; Attendance: 4,700

Game reference

Edgars Masaļskis
Sergejs Naumovs
Goalies
Sergei Shabanov
Referee:
Frank Awizus
Linesmen:
Ronni Jakobsen
Konstantin Gordenko

	0–1	05:16 – Bashko (Antonenko) (PP)
	0–2	12:06 – Mikulchik (Grabovski) (PP)
Sprukts (Sējējs) (PP) – 18:33	1–2
	1–3	21:49 – Grabovski (Savin, Koltsov)
Panteļejevs (Ozoliņš) – 22:07	2–3
	2–4	49:11 – Koltsov (Grabovski) (PP)
Bērziņš (Sprukts) (PP, EA) – 55:11	3–4
Sprukts – 56:58	4–4
Semjonovs (Ņiživijs) – 57:31	5–4

14 min
Penalties
45 min
40
Shots
24

=== Group C ===
Games were played in Klagenfurt, Austria.

Pos	Team	Pld	W	D	L	GF	GA	GD	Pts	Qualification
1	Kazakhstan	3	2	0	1	3	5	−2	4	2006 Winter Olympics
2	Austria (H)	3	1	1	1	8	5	+3	3	
3	France	3	1	1	1	5	5	0	3	
4	Ukraine	3	1	0	2	8	9	−1	2	

Source: IIHF.com
(H) Hosts

10 February 2005; 15:30	Ukraine	3–4 (0–1, 2–0, 1–3)	France	Eissportzentrum, Klagenfurt

Game reference

Oleksandr Fedorov
Goalies
Cristobal Huet
Referee:
Rudolf Lauff
Linesmen:
Jaromir Blaha
Milan Novak

	0–1	05:53 – Meunier (Bordeleau, Favarin) (PP)
Tsyrul (Shyriaiev) – 29:46	1–1
Gnidenko (Pastukh, Kasianchuk) – 33:29	2–1
	2–2	41:45 – Bordeleau (Besse, Meunier) (PP)
	2–3	45:28 – Coqueux (Bordeleau)
Salnikov (Tsyrul, Zavalnyuk) (PP) – 49:07	3–3
	3–4	52:34 – F. Rozenthal (Favarin)

20 min
Penalties
26 min
26
Shots
34

10 February 2005; 19:30	Kazakhstan	0–4 (0–0, 0–1, 0–3)	Austria	Eissportzentrum, Klagenfurt; Attendance: 2,500

Game reference

Vitali Kolesnik
Goalies
Claus Dalpiaz
Referee:
Brent Reiber
Linesmen:
Peter Kung
Daniel Wirth

0–1	24:12 – Peintner (Ressmann)
0–2	40:43 – Koch (Setzinger, Divis) (PP)
0–3	42:34 – Koch (Ressman, Peintner)
0–4	50:48 – Setzinger (Harand) (PP)

8 min
Penalties
4 min
22
Shots
34

11 February 2005; 15:30	Ukraine	1–2 (1–1, 0–1, 0–0)	Kazakhstan	Eissportzentrum, Klagenfurt

Game reference

Yevgen Brul
Goalies
Vitali Kolesnik
Referee:
Vladimir Sindler
Linesmen:
Matthias Langle
Daniel Wirth

	0–1	01:44 – Rozhnev (Kravets)
Timchenko – 19:30	1–1
	1–2	39:01 – Komissarov (Kovalenko)

20 min
Penalties
10 min
18
Shots
34

11 February 2005; 19:30	Austria	1–1 (0–1, 0–0, 1–0)	France	Eissportzentrum, Klagenfurt; Attendance: 3,300

Game reference
Claus Dalpiaz	Goalies	Cristobal Huet	Referee: Rudolf Lauff; Linesmen: Milan Novak; Peter Kung
/ 0–1 / 08:59 – Bordeleau (M. Rozenthal); Vanek (Pöck) (PP) – 45:35 / 1–1			Referee: Rudolf Lauff; Linesmen: Milan Novak; Peter Kung
6 min	Penalties	16 min	Referee: Rudolf Lauff; Linesmen: Milan Novak; Peter Kung
33	Shots	16	Referee: Rudolf Lauff; Linesmen: Milan Novak; Peter Kung

13 February 2005; 15:00	Austria	3–4 (1–2, 1–1, 1–1)	Ukraine	Eissportzentrum, Klagenfurt; Attendance: 2,200

Game reference

Claus Dalpiaz
Goalies
Oleksandr Fedorov
Referee:
Brent Reiber
Linesmen:
Milan Novak
Daniel Wirth

	0–1	12:52 – Isayenko (Zavalnyuk, Pastukh) (PP)
Ulrich (Peintner, Divis) (PP) – 15:27	1–1
	1–2	17:34 – Bobrovnikov (Zavalnyuk) (PP)
Koch (Ulrich) (PP) – 28:00	2–2
	2–3	36:59 – Gnidenko (Lytvynenko, Salnikov) (PP)
Kalt (Peintner) – 44:12	3–3
	3–4	53:13 – Tsyrul (Semenchenko, Shafarenko)

37 min
Penalties
14 min
35
Shots
21

13 February 2005; 19:00	France	0–1 (0–1, 0–0, 0–0)	Kazakhstan	Eissportzentrum, Klagenfurt

Game reference
Cristobal Huet	Goalies	Vitali Kolesnik	Referee: Vladimir Sindler; Linesmen: Peter Kung; Jaromir Blaha
0–1 / 17:57 – Samokhvalov (Polichshuk)			Referee: Vladimir Sindler; Linesmen: Peter Kung; Jaromir Blaha
12 min	Penalties	14 min	Referee: Vladimir Sindler; Linesmen: Peter Kung; Jaromir Blaha
26	Shots	18	Referee: Vladimir Sindler; Linesmen: Peter Kung; Jaromir Blaha
