= Beat Forster =

Swiss ice hockey player (born 1983)

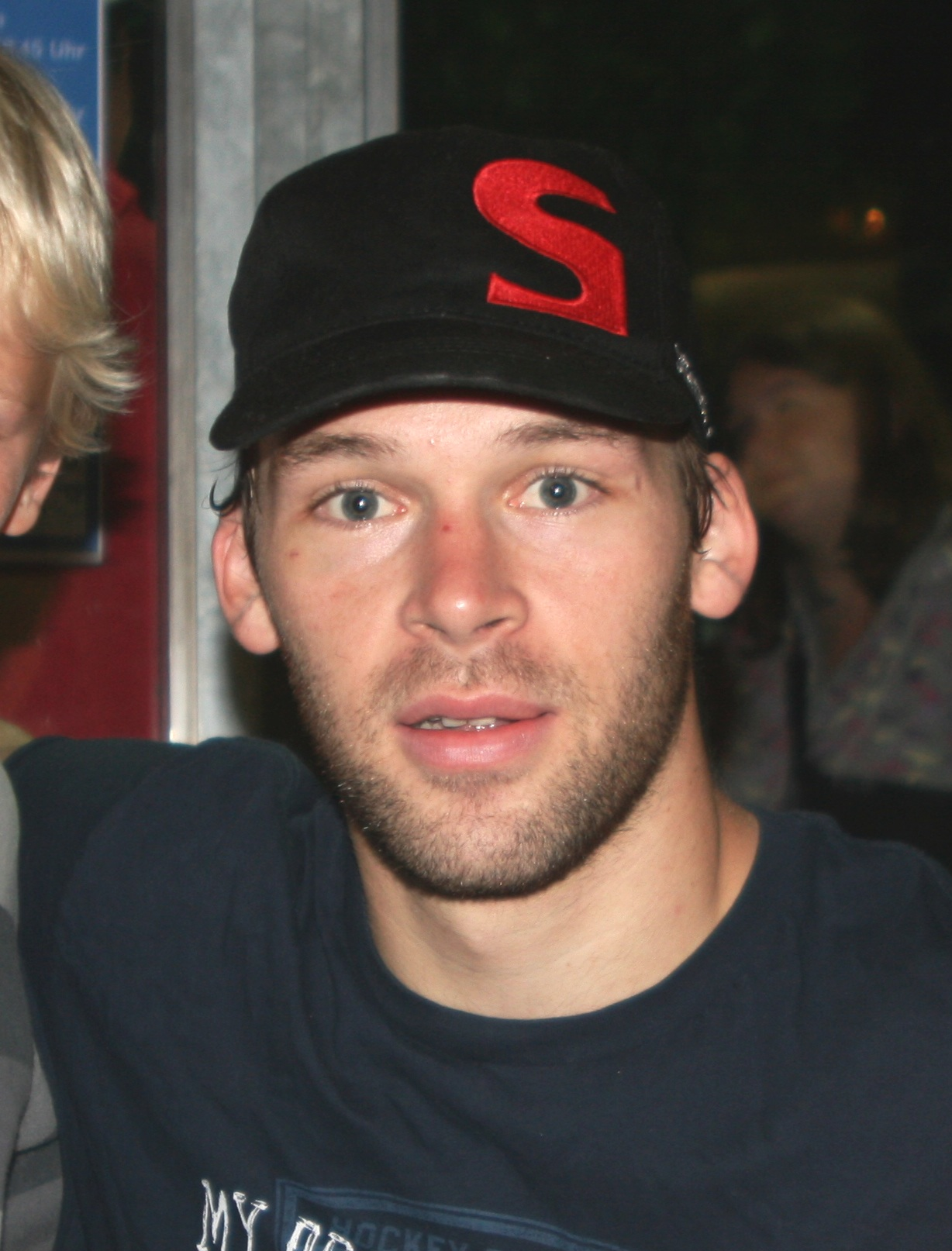
- Born: February 2, 1983 (age 42) Herisau, Switzerland
- Height: 6 ft 1 in (185 cm)
- Weight: 220 lb (100 kg; 15 st 10 lb)
- Position: Defence
- Shot: Left
- Played for: ZSC Lions; HC Davos; EHC Biel
- National team: Switzerland
- NHL draft: 78th overall, 2001; Phoenix Coyotes
- Playing career: 2000–2024

Beat Forster (born February 2, 1983) is a Swiss former professional ice hockey defenceman. He most notably played for HC Davos where he won 5 NL titles. He also played for the ZSC Lions and won one NL title with the team. Forster also played 7 years for EHC Biel before retiring following the 2023/24 season.

He is currently an assistant coach for EHC Biel.

== Playing career ==
On February 17, 2015, Forster was re-signed to a four-year contract extension by HC Davos.

On February 13, 2017, Forster agreed to a two-year contract with EHC Biel worth CHF 1.4 million, despite two years remaining on his contract with Davos. The contract will start for the 2017–18 season.

== International play ==
Forster played for the Swiss national ice hockey team at the 2006 Winter Olympics.

== Career statistics ==
=== Regular season and playoffs ===
			Regular season					Playoffs
Season	Team	League	GP	G	A	Pts	PIM	GP	G	A	Pts	PIM
1999–2000	HC Davos	SUI U20	34	4	15	19	40	6	1	0	1	6
2000–01	HC Davos	SUI U20	27	6	7	13	44	3	1	1	2	2
2000–01	HC Davos	NLA	7	0	0	0	6	3	0	0	0	2
2000–01	SC Herisau	SUI.2	3	0	0	0	16	—	—	—	—	—
2001–02	HC Davos	SUI U20	4	2	2	4	12	—	—	—	—	—
2001–02	HC Davos	NLA	33	1	3	4	49	16	0	1	1	2
2002–03	HC Davos	NLA	30	1	4	5	24	17	0	1	1	16
2002–03	EHC Lenzerheide–Valbella	SUI.3	1	0	2	2		—	—	—	—	—
2003–04	HC Davos	NLA	44	3	8	11	34	6	0	0	0	36
2004–05	HC Davos	NLA	29	3	4	7	28	15	1	0	1	10
2004–05	EHC Chur	SUI.2	1	0	1	1	2	—	—	—	—	—
2005–06	ZSC Lions	NLA	32	3	2	5	83	—	—	—	—	—
2006–07	ZSC Lions	NLA	44	7	3	10	119	7	0	1	1	12
2007–08	ZSC Lions	NLA	49	14	11	25	136	15	5	8	13	16
2008–09	ZSC Lions	NLA	26	5	11	16	58	—	—	—	—	—
2008–09	HC Davos	NLA	13	3	4	7	32	21	1	5	6	44
2009–10	HC Davos	NLA	50	13	18	31	97	6	1	2	3	12
2010–11	HC Davos	NLA	47	5	17	22	93	14	4	4	8	40
2011–12	HC Davos	NLA	37	5	20	25	40	4	0	0	0	2
2012–13	HC Davos	NLA	35	4	13	17	51	7	0	4	4	6
2013–14	HC Davos	NLA	48	4	10	14	66	6	1	2	3	6
2014–15	HC Davos	NLA	15	1	4	5	18	15	0	5	5	10
2015–16	HC Davos	NLA	44	8	13	21	116	8	0	3	3	29
2016–17	HC Davos	NLA	48	4	24	28	40	10	1	3	4	24
2017–18	EHC Biel	NL	46	10	15	25	38	12	2	3	5	6
2018–19	EHC Biel	NL	21	0	7	7	20	12	0	2	2	4
2019–20	EHC Biel	NL	50	2	12	14	24	—	—	—	—	—
2020–21	EHC Biel	NL	41	3	3	6	46	2	0	0	0	0
2021–22	EHC Biel	NL	49	0	7	7	24	7	0	0	0	0
NL totals			838	99	213	312	1242	200	16	44	60	277

=== International ===
Year	Team	Event	GP	G	A	Pts	PIM
2000	Switzerland	WJC18	7	0	0	0	24
2001	Switzerland	WJC	7	0	1	1	4
2001	Switzerland	WJC18	7	2	2	4	34
2002	Switzerland	WJC	7	0	2	2	10
2003	Switzerland	WJC	6	1	3	4	2
2003	Switzerland	WC	7	1	2	3	8
2004	Switzerland	WC	7	1	2	3	6
2005	Switzerland	OGQ	3	2	0	2	0
2005	Switzerland	WC	7	1	1	2	12
2006	Switzerland	OG	6	0	0	0	6
2006	Switzerland	WC	6	1	0	1	12
2007	Switzerland	WC	7	0	0	0	4
2008	Switzerland	WC	7	2	2	4	2
Junior totals			34	3	8	11	74
Senior totals			50	8	7	15	50
