= Severin Blindenbacher =

Swiss ice hockey player (born 1983)

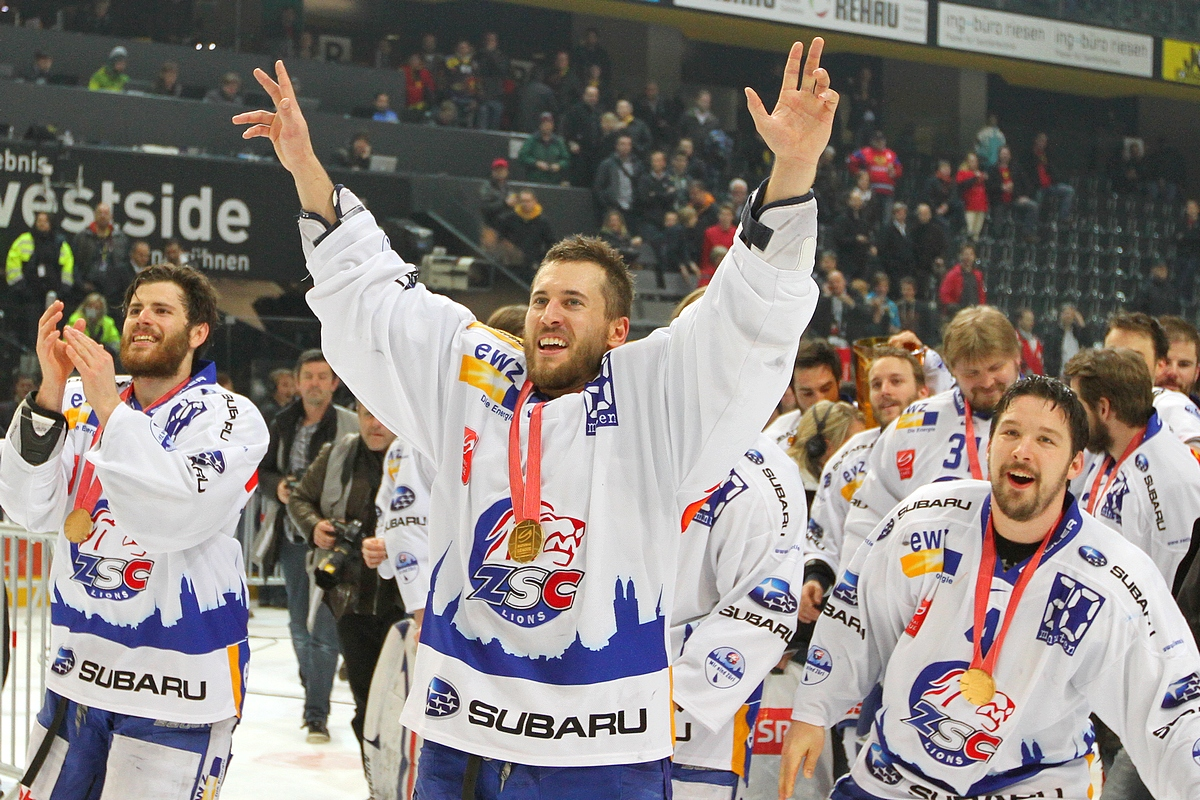
- Born: March 15, 1983 (age 43) Zürich, Switzerland
- Height: 5 ft 11 in (180 cm)
- Weight: 189 lb (86 kg; 13 st 7 lb)
- Position: Defence
- Shot: Right
- Played for: EHC Kloten; ZSC Lions; Färjestads BK; Texas Stars
- National team: Switzerland
- NHL draft: 273rd overall, 2001; Phoenix Coyotes
- Playing career: 2000–2020

Severin Blindenbacher (born March 15, 1983, in Zurich, Switzerland) is a Swiss former professional ice hockey defenceman who last played with as an alternate captain for the ZSC Lions of the National League (NL). He had also played for EHC Kloten of the NL and Färjestad BK of the Swedish Hockey League (SHL).

Internationally Blindenbacher played for the Swiss national team at multiple World Championships, and three Winter Olympics.

== Playing career ==
A junior with the Swiss National League A club, Kloten Flyers, Blindenbacher was drafted 273rd overall in the 2001 NHL entry draft by the Phoenix Coyotes. Unsigned by the Coyotes, Severin remained with the Flyers for the first five years of his professional career before joining fellow NLA club, ZSC Lions. In his fourth year with the Lions, Blindenbacher broke out offensively scoring 13 goals for 35 points in 47 games.

He left the NLA prior to the 2009–10 season and signed with the Swedish club, Färjestads BK of the Elitserien. In his one season with Färjestads, Severin led defensemen in scoring with 8 goals and 19 points in 48 games.

On July 1, 2010, Blindenbacher signed as a free agent to a one-year entry-level contract with the Dallas Stars of the National Hockey League (NHL). He spent the 2010–11 season with their American Hockey League (AHL) affiliate, Texas Stars, before returning to ZSC Lions.

On April 29, 2016, he agreed to a three-year contract extension worth CHF 2.7 million with the Lions.

== Career statistics ==
=== Regular season and playoffs ===
			Regular season					Playoffs
Season	Team	League	GP	G	A	Pts	PIM	GP	G	A	Pts	PIM
1998–99	Kloten Flyers	SUI U20	5	0	2	2	4	—	—	—	—	—
1999–2000	Kloten Flyers	SUI U20	30	8	10	18	18	4	1	1	2	8
2000–01	Kloten Flyers	SUI U20	4	3	1	4	8	1	0	0	0	4
2000–01	Kloten Flyers	NLA	27	0	2	2	17	9	0	0	0	10
2001–02	Kloten Flyers	NLA	38	1	3	4	22	10	0	2	2	10
2001–02	Kloten Flyers	SUI U20	—	—	—	—	—	1	0	1	1	2
2002–03	Kloten Flyers	NLA	43	4	19	23	52	5	1	0	1	4
2003–04	Kloten Flyers	NLA	34	4	10	14	58	—	—	—	—	—
2004–05	Kloten Flyers	NLA	41	10	15	25	66	—	—	—	—	—
2005–06	ZSC Lions	NLA	44	2	7	9	68	—	—	—	—	—
2006–07	ZSC Lions	NLA	39	6	12	18	54	7	0	1	1	8
2007–08	ZSC Lions	NLA	47	10	8	18	77	16	2	2	4	16
2008–09	ZSC Lions	NLA	47	13	22	35	68	4	0	0	0	0
2009–10	Färjestads BK	SEL	48	8	11	19	44	7	1	1	2	6
2010–11	Texas Stars	AHL	26	1	9	10	10	—	—	—	—	—
2011–12	ZSC Lions	NLA	40	5	17	22	77	15	0	4	4	16
2012–13	ZSC Lions	NLA	35	1	7	8	36	10	2	1	3	29
2013–14	ZSC Lions	NLA	50	1	12	13	44	18	1	3	4	16
2014–15	ZSC Lions	NLA	46	3	11	14	22	18	1	4	5	12
2015–16	ZSC Lions	NLA	46	3	22	25	28	4	1	1	2	0
2016–17	ZSC Lions	NLA	43	8	15	23	54	5	0	0	0	27
2017–18	ZSC Lions	NL	10	0	2	2	4	—	—	—	—	—
2018–19	ZSC Lions	NL	30	0	4	4	20	—	—	—	—	—
2019–20	ZSC Lions	NL	27	1	7	8	10	—	—	—	—	—
NL totals			687	72	195	267	775	121	8	18	26	148

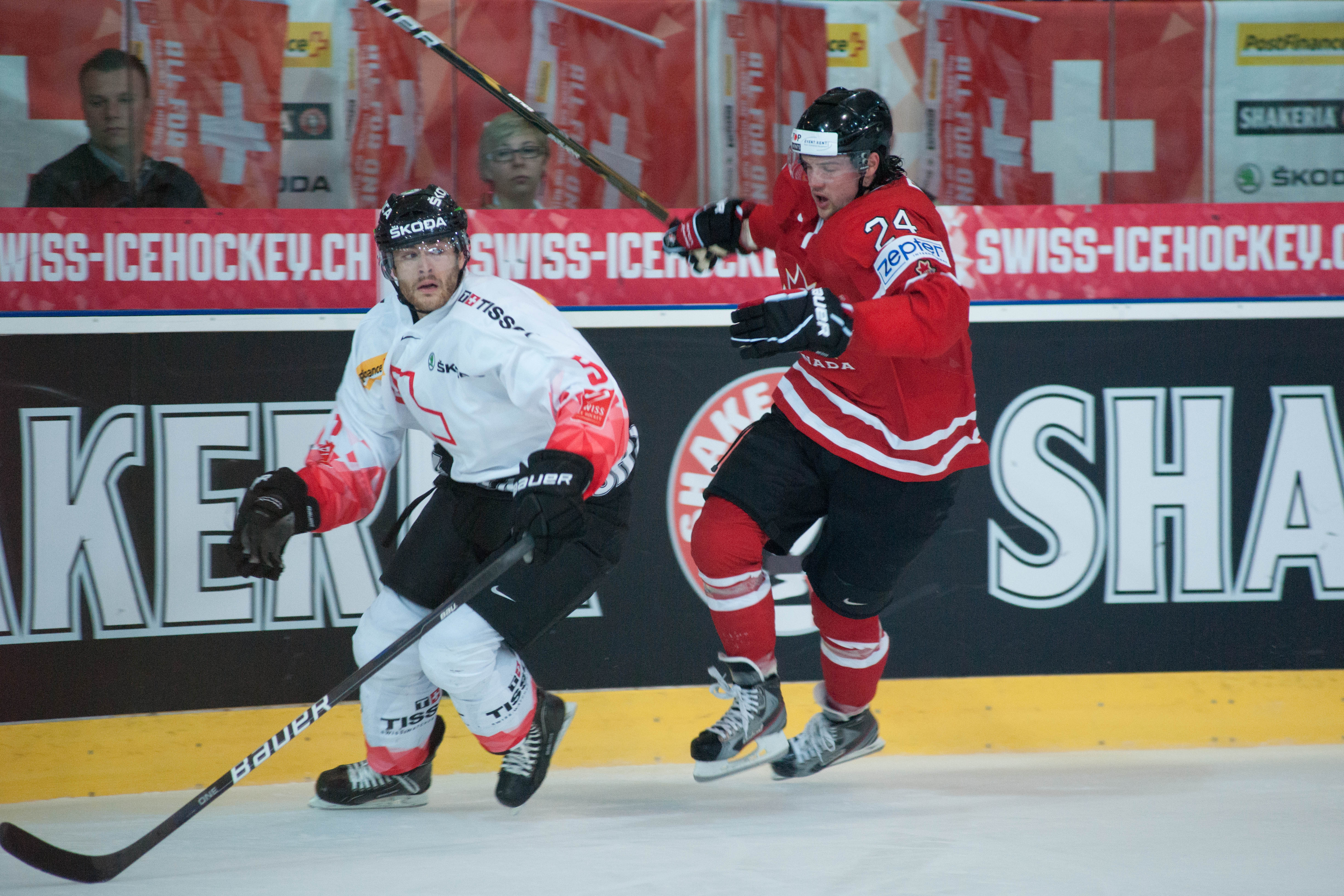

Medal record

Ice hockey

Representing Switzerland

World Championships
Silver medal – second place	2013 Sweden/Finland	

=== International ===
Year	Team	Event	GP	G	A	Pts	PIM
2000	Switzerland	WJC18	7	0	0	0	8
2001	Switzerland	WJC	7	0	0	0	10
2001	Switzerland	WJC18	7	2	3	5	10
2002	Switzerland	WJC	7	0	0	0	4
2003	Switzerland	WJC	6	2	3	5	4
2005	Switzerland	OGQ	3	0	2	2	2
2005	Switzerland	WC	5	1	1	2	12
2006	Switzerland	OG	6	0	1	1	6
2006	Switzerland	WC	5	0	2	2	12
2007	Switzerland	WC	7	0	1	1	2
2008	Switzerland	WC	6	0	3	3	2
2009	Switzerland	WC	6	0	2	2	6
2010	Switzerland	OG	5	1	1	2	4
2012	Switzerland	WC	7	0	3	3	2
2013	Switzerland	WC	10	0	1	1	12
2014	Switzerland	OG	4	0	0	0	2
Junior totals			34	4	6	10	36
Senior totals			71	2	18	20	62

- *All statistics taken from elitepropects.com
