= Patric Della Rossa =

Swiss ice hockey player

- Born: 28 July 1975 (age 50); Winterthur, Switzerland
- Height: 6 ft 2 in (188 cm)
- Weight: 203 lb (92 kg; 14 st 7 lb)
- Position: Forward
- Shot: Right
- NLB team: EHC Olten
- Played for: ZSC Lions; EV Zug; EHC Basel; HC Davos; Kloten Flyers
- National team: Switzerland
- NHL draft: Undrafted
- Playing career: 1992–2009

Patric Della Rossa (born 28 July 1975 in Winterthur, Switzerland) is a Swiss ice hockey player who currently plays for EHC Olten of the National League B (NLB). He has also represented the Switzerland men's national ice hockey team in the World Junior Championships, World Championships, and Olympics.

== Career statistics ==
=== Regular season and playoffs ===
			Regular season					Playoffs
Season	Team	League	GP	G	A	Pts	PIM	GP	G	A	Pts	PIM
1992–93	EHC Kloten	SUI U20
1992–93	EHC Kloten	NDA	5	0	0	0	0	—	—	—	—	—
1993–94	EHC Kloten	SUI U20
1993–94	EHC Kloten	NDA	33	2	4	6	0	11	0	1	1	0
1994–95	EHC Kloten	SUI U20
1994–95	EHC Kloten	NDA	30	2	0	2	6	12	0	1	1	2
1995–96	EHC Kloten	SUI U20
1995–96	EHC Kloten	NDA	35	4	2	6	16	9	1	0	1	0
1996–97	EHC Kloten	NDA	46	3	7	10	20	4	0	1	1	0
1997–98	EHC Kloten	NDA	8	0	0	0	0	—	—	—	—	—
1997–98	EHC Bülach	SUI.2	8	0	0	0	0	—	—	—	—	—
1997–98	Grasshopper Club Zürich	SUI.2	1	1	0	1	0	—	—	—	—	—
1997–98	ZSC Lions	NDA	21	4	8	12	12	—	—	—	—	—
1998–99	ZSC Lions	NDA	45	15	13	28	22	6	1	0	1	0
1999–2000	ZSC Lions	NDA	45	15	16	31	57	15	3	3	6	18
2000–01	ZSC Lions	NLA	44	4	7	11	40	13	1	0	1	6
2001–02	ZSC Lions	NLA	41	9	6	15	32	17	0	1	1	20
2002–03	ZSC Lions	NLA	44	6	8	14	34	12	2	0	2	2
2003–04	ZSC Lions	NLA	29	3	7	10	73	13	1	1	2	4
2004–05	EV Zug	NLA	39	8	11	19	12	9	2	1	3	6
2005–06	EV Zug	NLA	42	6	8	14	69	7	0	0	0	4
2006–07	EHC Basel	NLA	44	9	8	17	26	—	—	—	—	—
2007–08	EHC Basel	NLA	48	7	7	14	56	—	—	—	—	—
2008–09	HC Davos	NLA	20	2	4	6	10	—	—	—	—	—
2008–09	Kloten Flyers	NLA	7	0	1	1	2	2	0	0	0	0
2009–10	GCK Lions	SUI.2	27	5	6	11	10	—	—	—	—	—
2009–10	EHC Olten	SUI.2	7	4	4	8	12	—	—	—	—	—
2010–11	EHC Olten	SUI.2	42	10	8	18	58	10	4	4	8	0
2011–12	EHC Olten	SUI.2	33	9	9	18	14	5	2	1	3	0
NDA/NLA totals			626	99	117	216	487	130	11	9	20	62
SUI.2 totals			115	32	28	60	94	27	11	6	17	8

=== International ===
Year	Team	Event	GP	G	A	Pts	PIM
1993	Switzerland	EJC B	7	9	2	11	2
1994	Switzerland	WJC	7	1	2	3	4
1995	Switzerland	WJC B	7	0	1	1	8
1999	Switzerland	WC	6	1	0	1	4
2000	Switzerland	WC	7	0	1	1	6
2001	Switzerland	WC	6	1	1	2	2
2002	Switzerland	OG	4	0	0	0	2
2003	Switzerland	WC	7	0	0	0	2
2004	Switzerland	WC	7	0	1	1	10
2005	Switzerland	OGQ	3	1	0	1	2
2005	Switzerland	WC	7	0	0	0	6
2006	Switzerland	OG	6	0	3	3	4
2006	Switzerland	WC	6	1	1	2	4
2007	Switzerland	WC	7	0	0	0	6
Junior totals			21	10	5	15	14
Senior totals			66	4	7	11	48
