= Vyacheslav Zavalnyuk =

Ukrainian ice hockey player

- Born: 10 December 1974 (age 50); Kiev, Ukrainian SSR, Soviet Union
- Height: 6 ft 0 in (183 cm)
- Weight: 198 lb (90 kg; 14 st 2 lb)
- Position: Defenceman
- Shot: Left
- Played for: Metallurg Magnitogorsk; Severstal Cherepovets; Sibir Novosibirsk; SKA St. Petersburg; Metallurg Novokuznetsk; HC Dynamo Moscow; Sokil Kyiv; ShVSM Kyiv
- National team: Ukraine
- Playing career: 1990–2007

Vyacheslav Dimitrovich Zavalnyuk (Ukrainian: В'ячеслав Дмитрович Завальнюк; born 10 December 1974), is a Ukrainian retired professional ice hockey player. He played for multiple teams during a career that lasted from 1990 until 2007. He also played internationally for the Ukrainian national team at several World Championships, as well as the 2002 Winter Olympics.

== Career statistics ==
=== Regular season and playoffs ===
			Regular season					Playoffs
Season	Team	League	GP	G	A	Pts	PIM	GP	G	A	Pts	PIM
1990–91	ShVSM Kyiv	URS.3	1	0	0	0	0	—	—	—	—	—
1991–92	ShVSM Kyiv	CIS.3	30	3	1	4	30	—	—	—	—	—
1992–93	Sokil Kyiv	IHL	29	0	2	2	12	—	—	—	—	—
1992–93	Sokil–2 Kyiv	RUS.2	8	2	1	3	6	—	—	—	—	—
1993–94	Sokil Kyiv	IHL	38	0	0	0	22	—	—	—	—	—
1994–95	Sokil Kyiv	IHL	41	1	0	1	26	—	—	—	—	—
1994–95	Sokil–2 Kyiv	RUS.2	2	0	0	0	0	—	—	—	—	—
1995–96	Dynamo Moscow	IHL	39	2	5	7	16	12	0	0	0	8
1996–97	Dynamo Moscow	RSL	35	1	4	5	38	4	0	0	0	4
1996–97	Dynamo–2 Moscow	RUS.3	4	1	1	2	6	—	—	—	—	—
1997–98	Neftekhimik Nizhnekamsk	RSL	41	3	5	8	26	2	0	0	0	4
1997–98	Neftekhimik–2 Nizhnekamsk	RUS.3	1	0	0	0	4	—	—	—	—	—
1998–99	Metallurg Novokuznetsk	RSL	42	0	6	6	44	6	0	1	1	4
1999–2000	SKA St. Petersburg	RSL	37	3	9	12	60	4	0	1	1	0
2000–01	Krylia Sovetov Moscow	RSL	38	7	9	16	89	7	0	2	2	2
2001–02	SKA St. Petersburg	RSL	42	0	6	6	38	—	—	—	—	—
2002–03	SKA St. Petersburg	RSL	24	4	3	7	39	—	—	—	—	—
2002–03	SKA–2 St. Petersburg	RUS.3	1	0	0	0	0	—	—	—	—	—
2003–04	SKA St. Petersburg	RSL	47	2	10	12	55	—	—	—	—	—
2003–04	SKA–2 St. Petersburg	RUS.3	1	0	0	0	12	—	—	—	—	—
2004–05	Sibir Novosibirsk	RSL	46	6	7	13	32	—	—	—	—	—
2005–06	Sibir Novosibirsk	RSL	48	5	12	17	76	4	0	1	1	6
2006–07	Severstal Cherepovets	RSL	10	0	5	5	41	—	—	—	—	—
2006–07	Metallurg Magnitogorsk	RSL	19	1	0	1	14	14	0	1	1	16
2006–07	Metallurg–2 Magnitogorsk	RUS.3	1	0	0	0	0	—	—	—	—	—
IHL totals			147	3	7	10	76	12	0	0	0	8
RSL totals			391	25	67	92	463	34	0	4	4	34

=== International ===
Year	Team	Event	GP	G	A	Pts	PIM
1992	Ukraine	WJC C Q	3	0	0	0	2
1993	Ukraine	WJC C	4	1	4	5	4
1994	Ukraine	WJC B	7	0	4	4	0
1999	Ukraine	WC	3	0	0	0	18
1999	Ukraine	WC Q	3	0	1	1	2
2000	Ukraine	WC	6	1	0	1	8
2001	Ukraine	WC	4	0	0	0	0
2002	Ukraine	OG	4	0	0	0	4
2002	Ukraine	WC	6	0	0	0	14
2003	Ukraine	WC	6	1	0	1	8
2004	Ukraine	WC	5	0	0	0	2
2005	Ukraine	OGQ	3	0	3	3	2
2005	Ukraine	WC	5	0	0	0	4
2006	Ukraine	WC	4	0	0	0	18
2007	Ukraine	WC	6	0	3	3	35
Junior totals			14	1	8	9	6
Senior totals			55	2	7	9	115
