= Marcel Jenni =

Swiss ice hockey player

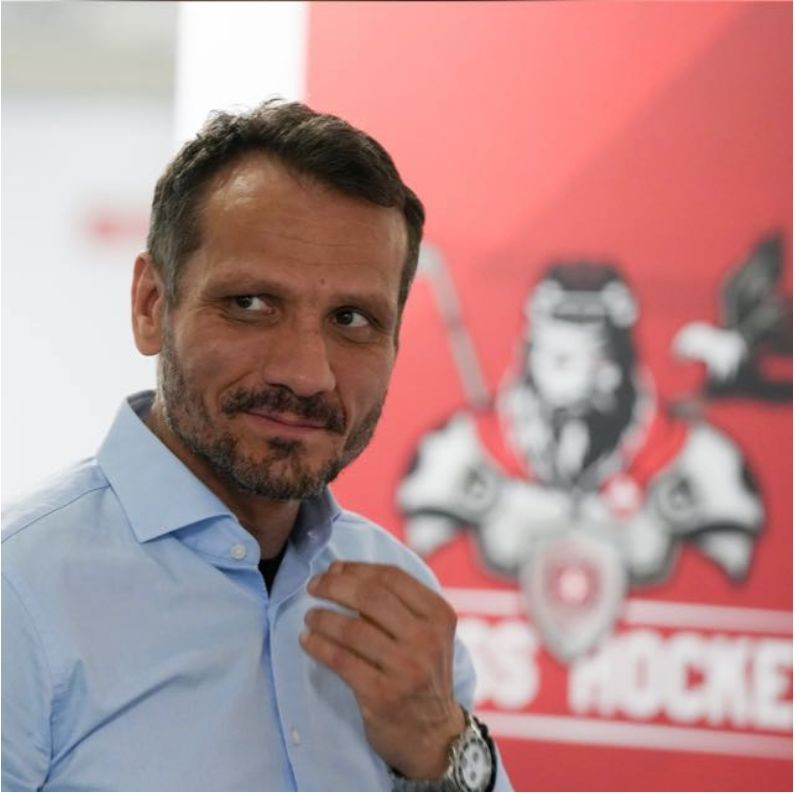
- Jenni in Prague in May 2024.
- Born: 2 March 1974 (age 52) Zürich, SUI
- Height: 5 ft 11 in (180 cm)
- Weight: 194 lb (88 kg; 13 st 12 lb)
- Position: Left wing, right wing, center, defense
- Shot: Left
- Played for: Kloten Flyers; HC Lugano; Färjestads BK; GC Zürich
- National team: Switzerland
- Playing career: 1992–2015

Marcel Jenni (born 2 March 1974) is a professional ice hockey coach and former player who is the assistant coach for the Swiss National Men’s Ice Hockey Team. Jenni played over 1,000 professional games in the highest leagues of Switzerland (National League A - HC Lugano and EHC Kloten) and Sweden (Elitserien - Färjestad BK), as well as 17 appearances representing Switzerland in international competitions.

== Playing career ==
Jenni was born and raised in Zürich, Switzerland. He started his ice hockey career in 1981, at the age of 7, with EHC Illnau-Effretikon. He made his professional debut in the 1992-1993 season with GC Zürich in the Swiss League. The following season, 1993-1994, Jenni moved up to the Swiss National League A with HC Lugano, with whom he became a champion in the 1999 Swiss National League Championships. During his time in Lugano, he was named as 1997-1998 NLA Forward of the Year. He enjoyed a great relationship with the fans in Lugano, who wrote a song about Jenni called Fenomeno ("Phenomenon").

Jenni played with HC Lugano until 2000, when he moved to Karlstad, Sweden to play for Färjestad BK in the Swedish Elitserien. During his time in Sweden, he was the Elitserien Playoff Top Scorer in 2001 and became champion for the second time in 2002, in the Swedish Elitserien Championship. In Sweden, too, he was warmly embraced by Färjestad BK fans.

In 2005, Jenni returned to Switzerland to play for the Kloten Flyers. He enjoyed a 10-year run with the Flyers, during which he earned the nickname of "Hockeygott" ("Hockey God"). Jenni ultimately retired in an emotional farewell celebration in October 2015 after a major spinal injury and concussion incurred in an October 2014 game.

His playing career is distinguished both for its longevity (over 1,000 games over the course of 23 years, one of the longest professional ice hockey careers in Swiss history), and for his ability to play multiple positions at the highest level: left wing, center, right wing, and even defense. He remains the #5 top-scoring player in Swiss history.

=== International appearances ===
Jenni has represented his native Switzerland in international competition 17 times. His first appearance was on the Swiss U18 National Team in 1991. He was on the U18 again in 1992, the U20 National Team in 1993 and 1994, and the Swiss National Team A in 1994, 1995, 1996, 1997, 1998, 1999, 2000, 2001, 2003, 2004, 2005, 2006, and 2010. Jenni also represented Switzerland twice in the Olympic Games, in Salt Lake City in 2002 and in Turin in 2006.

== Coaching career ==
After retiring in 2015 from his playing career, Jenni immediately began his coaching career as an assistant coach with the EVZ Academy in Zug, Switzerland, for the team’s inaugural season. In 2017-2018 he was named head coach of the EV Zug U17-Elit team, where he coached three seasons. He coached the team to a silver medal in 2018 and a gold medal in 2019 in the U17-Elit Swiss Championships. The 2020 championship was cancelled due to COVID-19.

Jenni was then selected as head coach for the Switzerland U18 National Team, where he served from 2021 to 2023. The team made the quarter-finals at the IIHF U18 World Championships all three years. In 2023, Jenni moved up as head coach of the Switzerland U20 National Team. He coached the team to the IIHF U20 World Championship quarter finals in 2023-2024 and 2024-2025 before retiring from the position. Concurrently in 2023, Jenni began as the assistant coach to Patrick Fischer for the Switzerland Men’s National Ice Hockey Team, which he helped win silver medals in the 2024 and 2025 IIHF World Ice Hockey Championships and a quarter-final finish at the 2026 Olympic Games in Milan.

In March 2026, the Swiss National Team announced that Jenni had signed a two-year extension as assistant coach under Jan Cadieux. On the same day, EHC Kloten announced that he would join them concurrently as an assistant coach during the 2026-2027 Swiss National League season.

== Career statistics ==
=== Regular season and playoffs ===
			Regular season					Playoffs
Season	Team	League	GP	G	A	Pts	PIM	GP	G	A	Pts	PIM
1990–91	Grasshopper Club Zürich	SUI.3
1991–92	Grasshopper Club Zürich	SUI.2 U20
1991–92	Grasshopper Club Zürich	SUI.3
1992–93	Grasshopper Club Zürich	SUI.2 U20
1992–93	Grasshopper Club Zürich	SUI.3
1993–94	HC Lugano	NDA	34	3	5	8	44	9	3	2	5	4
1994–95	HC Lugano	NDA	36	14	24	38	48	5	2	3	5	12
1995–96	HC Lugano	NDA	35	14	20	34	24	4	1	1	2	2
1996–97	HC Lugano	NDA	46	18	28	46	64	8	2	6	8	14
1997–98	HC Lugano	NDA	40	12	34	46	60	7	5	4	9	8
1998–99	HC Lugano	NDA	42	18	18	36	40	16	6	9	15	18
1999–2000	HC Lugano	NLA	33	11	15	26	30	—	—	—	—	—
1999–2000	Färjestad BK	SEL	14	6	4	10	18	7	1	2	3	4
2000–01	Färjestad BK	SEL	48	12	17	29	32	16	7	11	18	16
2001–02	Färjestad BK	SEL	49	9	13	22	22	10	1	7	8	10
2002–03	Färjestad BK	SEL	38	14	17	31	46	14	3	3	6	18
2003–04	Färjestad BK	SEL	50	13	13	26	50	16	1	1	2	10
2004–05	Färjestad BK	SEL	25	2	6	8	6	15	5	6	11	45
2005–06	Kloten Flyers	NLA	44	12	18	30	42	11	3	3	6	30
2006–07	Kloten Flyers	NLA	44	6	21	27	92	11	4	4	8	18
2007–08	Kloten Flyers	NLA	44	8	15	23	94	5	0	1	1	4
2008–09	Kloten Flyers	NLA	50	17	30	47	84	15	3	10	13	6
2009–10	Kloten Flyers	NLA	49	8	20	28	40	10	1	6	7	26
2010–11	Kloten Flyers	NLA	18	3	4	7	2	—	—	—	—	—
2011–12	Kloten Flyers	NLA	48	12	12	24	65	5	1	2	3	2
2012–13	Kloten Flyers	NLA	46	11	9	20	34	—	—	—	—	—
2013–14	Kloten Flyers	NLA	38	6	12	18	32	15	1	2	3	16
2014–15	Kloten Flyers	NLA	10	1	2	3	8	—	—	—	—	—
NDA/NLA totals			658	174	287	461	803	121	32	53	85	160
SEL totals			224	56	70	126	174	78	18	30	48	93

=== International ===
Year	Team	Event	GP	G	A	Pts	PIM
1991	Switzerland	EJC	5	0	1	1	4
1992	Switzerland	EJC	6	2	1	3	30
1993	Switzerland	WJC B	7	2	3	5	14
1994	Switzerland	WJC	7	0	1	1	2
1995	Switzerland	WC	7	1	0	1	8
1996	Switzerland	WC B	7	3	0	3	4
1997	Switzerland	OGQ	4	1	0	1	4
1997	Switzerland	WC B	7	0	8	8	8
1998	Switzerland	WC	9	3	5	8	14
1999	Switzerland	WC	6	2	0	2	0
2000	Switzerland	WC	7	2	3	5	4
2001	Switzerland	WC	6	1	2	3	12
2002	Switzerland	OG	2	0	0	0	0
2003	Switzerland	WC	4	0	0	0	2
2004	Switzerland	WC	7	2	2	4	12
2005	Switzerland	OGQ	3	1	2	3	2
2006	Switzerland	OG	6	0	0	0	4
2010	Switzerland	WC	7	0	0	0	0
Junior totals			25	4	6	10	50
Senior totals			82	16	22	38	74
