= Grigorijs Panteļejevs =

Latvian ice hockey player (born 1972)

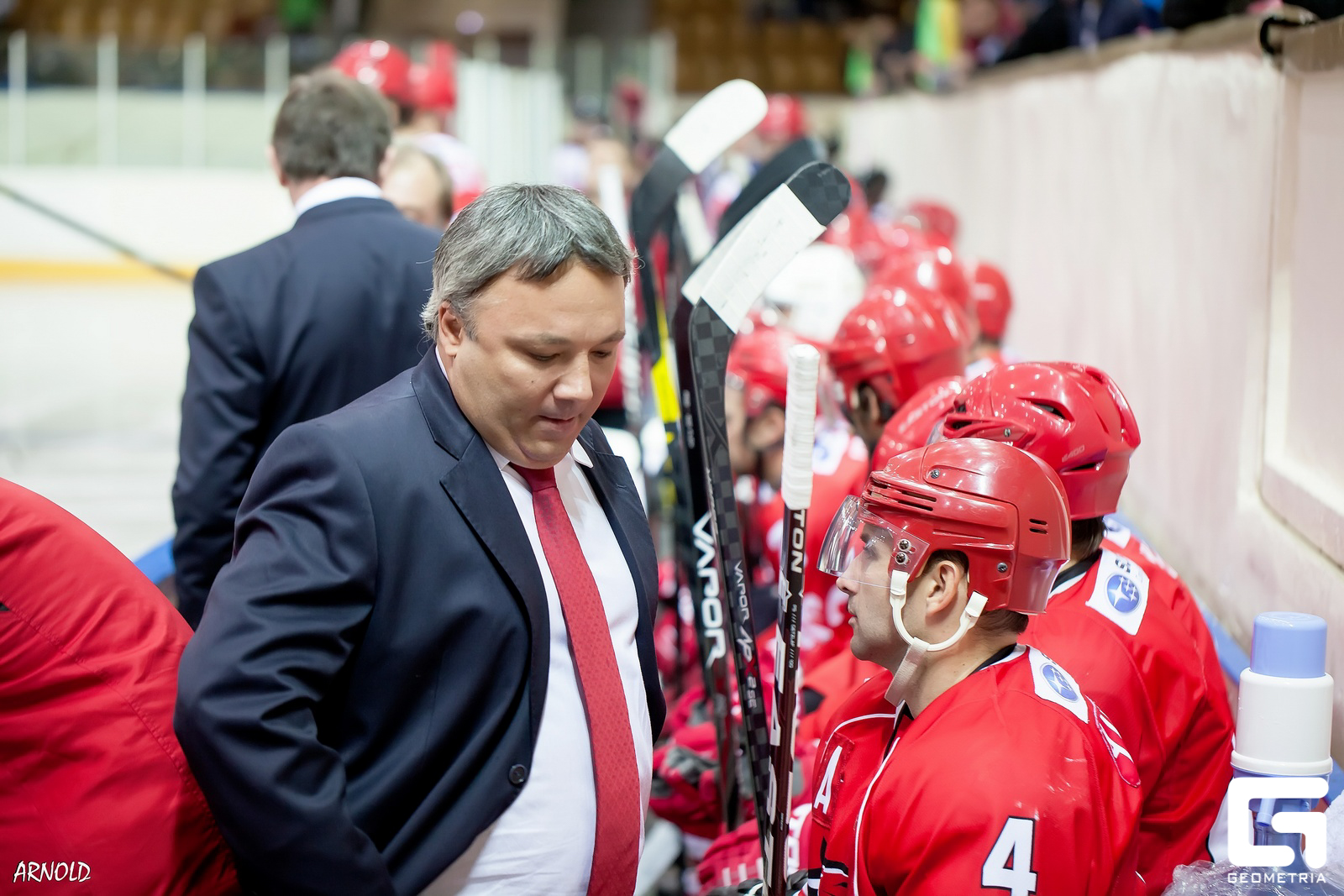
- Panteļejevs in 2014
- Born: November 13, 1972 (age 53) Gastello, Soviet Union
- Height: 5 ft 9 in (175 cm)
- Weight: 185 lb (84 kg; 13 st 3 lb)
- Position: Left wing
- Shot: Left
- Played for: Boston Bruins; New York Islanders
- National team: Latvia
- NHL draft: 136th overall, 1992; Boston Bruins
- Playing career: 1987–2008

Grigorijs Panteļejevs (born November 13, 1972, in Gastello, Soviet Union) is a Latvian ice hockey coach and former player.

== Career ==
The 5th choice, 136th overall selection of the Boston Bruins in the 1992 NHL entry draft, Panteļejevs came to North America and the NHL in 1992-93 after spending the past two seasons with Dynamo Riga.

Upon his arrival in North America, diminutive forward went on to split his first season with Boston and their AHL affiliate in Providence before spending the majority of the next two seasons in Providence.

After three seasons in the Bruins organization, Panteļejevs was released following the 1994-95 season only to be signed as a free agent by the New York Islanders in September 1995.

Panteļejevs played only four games with the Islanders while playing the majority of the 1995-96 season with the IHL's Utah Grizzlies and Las Vegas Thunder. In 1996-97, Panteļejevs joined the IHL's San Antonio Dragons and went on to play a little over one season with the team before being dealt to the Orlando Solar Bears early into the 1997-98 IHL season.

The Gastello, USSR native returned to Orlando the following year before heading overseas in 99-2000 as a member of the Hannover Scorpions of the Bundesliga/Deutsche Eishockey Liga and went on to represent Latvia in the 2000 World Championships. After only one season in Germany, jumped to the Swiss League then to the Swedish Elite League before landing in Finland in 2002-03. During those three seasons, the diminutive forward went on to represent Latvia two more times at the World Championships, once in 2001 and again in 2003.

Panteļejevs made himself available for the 2004 World Championships held in Prague, Czech Republic, and did the same in 2005.

He has played in 9 World championships and 2006 Olympics for Latvian national team.

He is currently the head coach of HK Rostov.

== Career statistics ==
=== Regular season and playoffs ===
			Regular season					Playoffs
Season	Team	League	GP	G	A	Pts	PIM	GP	G	A	Pts	PIM
1987–88	RASMS Rīga	URS.3	1	0	0	0	0	—	—	—	—	—
1988–89	RASMS–Energo Rīga	URS.3	3	1	0	1	0	—	—	—	—	—
1989–90	RASMS–Energo Rīga	URS.3	2	0	0	0	0	—	—	—	—	—
1990–91	Dinamo Rīga	URS	23	4	1	5	4	—	—	—	—	—
1990–91	RASMS Rīga	URS.3	27	15	5	20	18	—	—	—	—	—
1991–92	Dinamo Rīga	CIS	26	4	8	12	4	—	—	—	—	—
1991–92	RASMS Rīga	CIS.3	4	4	2	6	0	—	—	—	—	—
1992–93	Boston Bruins	NHL	39	8	6	14	12	—	—	—	—	—
1992–93	Providence Bruins	AHL	39	17	30	47	22	3	0	0	0	10
1993–94	Boston Bruins	NHL	10	0	0	0	0	—	—	—	—	—
1993–94	Providence Bruins	AHL	55	24	26	50	20	—	—	—	—	—
1994–95	Providence Bruins	AHL	70	20	23	43	36	13	8	11	19	6
1994–95	Boston Bruins	NHL	1	0	0	0	0	—	—	—	—	—
1995–96	New York Islanders	NHL	4	0	0	0	0	—	—	—	—	—
1995–96	Utah Grizzlies	IHL	33	11	25	36	18	—	—	—	—	—
1995–96	Las Vegas Thunder	IHL	29	15	21	36	14	15	4	7	11	2
1996–97	San Antonio Dragons	IHL	81	25	37	62	41	9	4	2	6	4
1997–98	Orlando Solar Bears	IHL	63	27	29	56	44	17	6	9	15	2
1998–99	Orlando Solar Bears	IHL	77	25	37	62	51	17	8	8	16	4
1999–2000	Hannover Scorpions	DEL	55	11	21	32	59	—	—	—	—	—
2000–01	Lokomotiv Yaroslavl	RSL	19	4	5	9	12	6	0	1	1	0
2001–02	Södertälje SK	SEL	11	4	1	5	6	—	—	—	—	—
2001–02	EHC Olten	SUI.2	9	4	5	9	4	—	—	—	—	—
2001–02	HK Rīga 2000	EEHL	14	6	9	15		—	—	—	—	—
2002–03	Pelicans	SM-l	40	4	9	13	65	—	—	—	—	—
2003–04	HK Rīga 2000	EEHL	18	1	7	8	35	—	—	—	—	—
2004–05	IFK Arboga IK	SWE.2	27	9	10	19	22	8	3	4	7	8
2005–06	MHC Dmitrov	RUS.2	23	4	5	9	12	—	—	—	—	—
2005–06	MHC–2 Dmitrov	RUS.3	7	1	2	3	20	—	—	—	—	—
2005–06	HC Bolzano	ITA	7	5	7	12	8	—	—	—	—	—
2005–06	EV Zug	NLA	7	0	1	1	0	—	—	—	—	—
2005–06	HC Martigny	SUI.2	1	1	1	2	0	—	—	—	—	—
2006–07	HC Martigny	SUI.2	43	10	41	51	34	—	—	—	—	—
2006–07	SG Pontebba	ITA	10	5	5	10	0	—	—	—	—	—
2007–08	EK Zell am See	AUT.2	23	11	17	28	33	—	—	—	—	—
2007–08	EV Landsberg 2000	GER.2	9	1	2	3	4	4	1	1	2	0
NHL totals			54	8	6	14	12	—	—	—	—	—
AHL totals			164	61	79	140	78	16	8	11	19	16
IHL totals			283	103	149	252	168	58	22	26	48	12

=== International ===
Year	Team	Event	GP	G	A	Pts	PIM
1994	Latvia	WC B	5	1	5	6	2
1999	Latvia	WC Q	3	1	0	1	0
2000	Latvia	WC	7	1	1	2	2
2001	Latvia	OGQ	3	0	0	0	2
2001	Latvia	WC	6	1	2	3	2
2002	Latvia	OG	4	2	0	2	2
2002	Latvia	WC	6	2	0	2	0
2003	Latvia	WC	6	1	3	4	0
2004	Latvia	WC	7	2	2	4	0
2005	Latvia	OGQ	3	2	0	2	2
2005	Latvia	WC	6	0	2	2	4
2006	Latvia	OG	5	0	3	3	0
2006	Latvia	WC	4	0	0	0	0
2007	Latvia	WC	6	0	2	2	4
Senior totals			71	13	20	33	20
