= Anatoli Belyayev =

Belarusian ice hockey player (1952–2025)

Anatoli Ivanovich Belyayev (Russian: Анатолий Иванович Беляев; 4 May 1952 – 2 December 2025) was a Belarusian ice hockey player and coach.

== Biography ==
Belyayev was born on 4 May 1952. He began his playing career in 1970, playing for the "B" team "Kedr" Sverdlovsk-44 (1970–71 – 1971–72). During the 1974–75 – 1975–76 seasons, he played for Torpedo Minsk, and since 1975, for Dinamo Minsk.

In the 1977–78 season, he played for Dynamo Moscow. Returning to Dinamo Minsk, he played until 1982, in the 1980–81 season he played 44 matches.

In 2002, he was a member of the coaching staff of the national team at the 2002 Olympic Games. He was awarded the title of Honored Coach of the Republic of Belarus in hockey.

Belyayev died on 2 December 2025, at the age of 73.
