= Rīgas Sporta pils =

Former ice hockey arena in Riga, Latvia

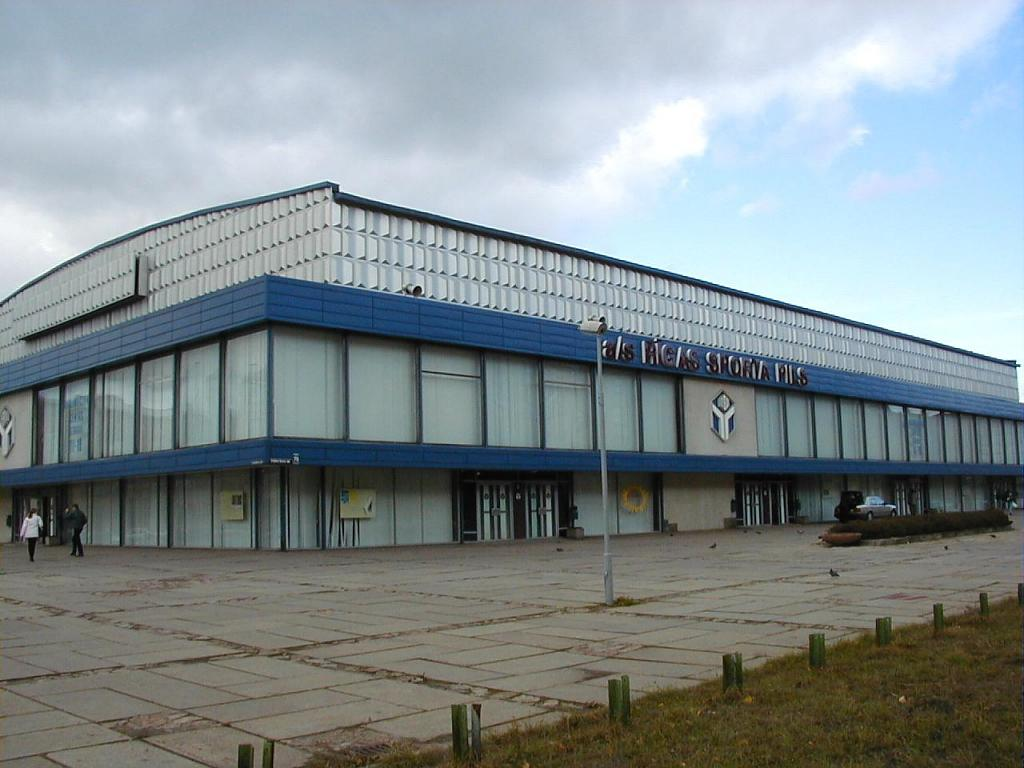

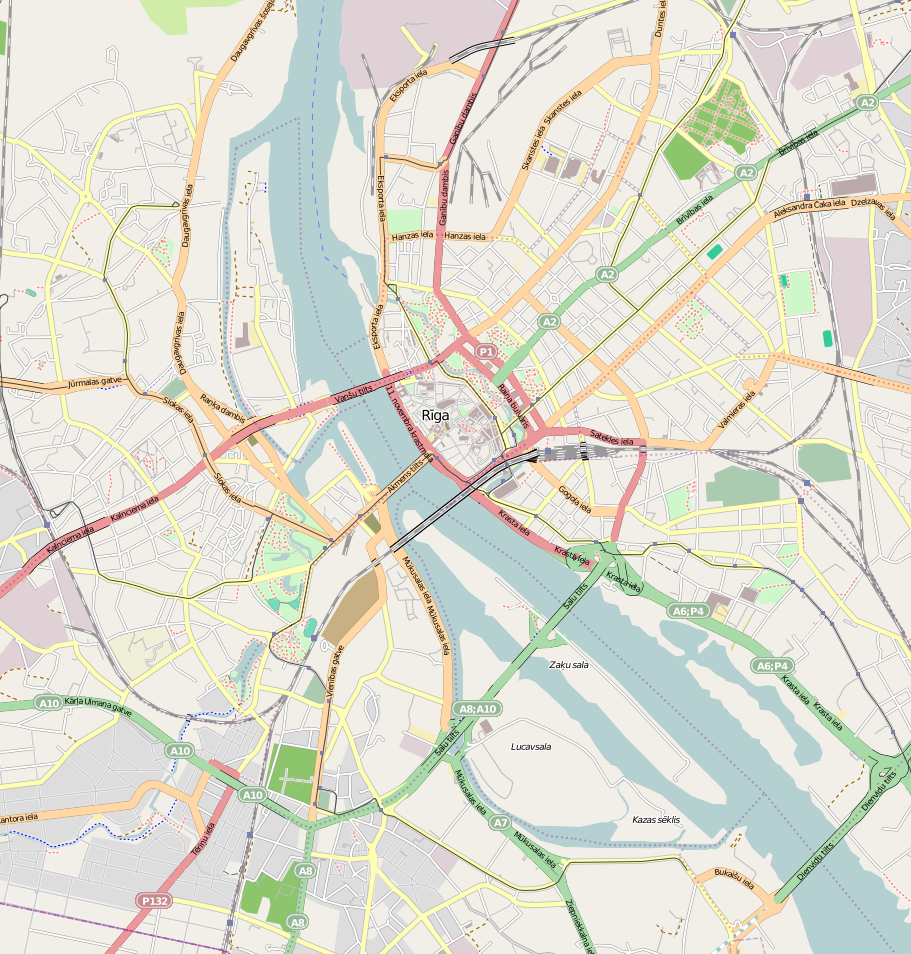
- Location within Riga

General information
- Type: ice hockey arena
- Location: Krišjāņa Barona iela 75, Centrs, Rīga, Latvia
- Coordinates: 56°57′34″N 24°08′10″E
- Completed: 1970
- Demolished: 2007

Riga Sports Palace (Latvian: Rīgas Sporta pils) was an ice hockey arena in Centrs, Riga, Latvia. It was built in 1970 with 4,500 permanent seats with a total capacity of 5,500 including room for 500 standing spectators.

In the 1970s and 1980s, it was the home arena for the renowned ice hockey club Dinamo Riga and also frequently hosted figure skating, basketball, and tennis events.

From 1990 until 2006 it was the home to the Latvian national ice hockey team and until end of the 1990s was host of almost all Latvian Hockey League teams. However, since 2006 Latvian national ice hockey team has been played its home games in the 10,300-seat Arena Riga that was built to host the 2006 Men's World Ice Hockey Championships. Chief of arena for long term was legendary ice hockey player Helmuts Balderis.

The last owner of arena Jānis Leimanis announced his plans to renew the arena and area near arena (starting at summer 2007). His aim was to make it more suitable for residential and commercial needs – to build flats, offices, hotels and keep renewed ice hall itself.

The Rīgas Sporta pils was mostly demolished in 2007 for redevelopment into the Estonian Rotermann Group-led Rotermann Square project, but by 2008 the project had stopped. From 2020 to 2025, the site operated as a collection of urban garden allotments called the Riga Sports Palace Gardens, managed by the Riga City Council. In 2024, the new developer - SIA Estera Development - announced the beginning of new development in the area starting from 2025, and the construction of the first building of the Tērbatas dārzs project was announced in February 2025, with the whole project to be completed by Q4 of 2026.
