= Oleksandr Fedorov =

Ukrainian ice hockey player

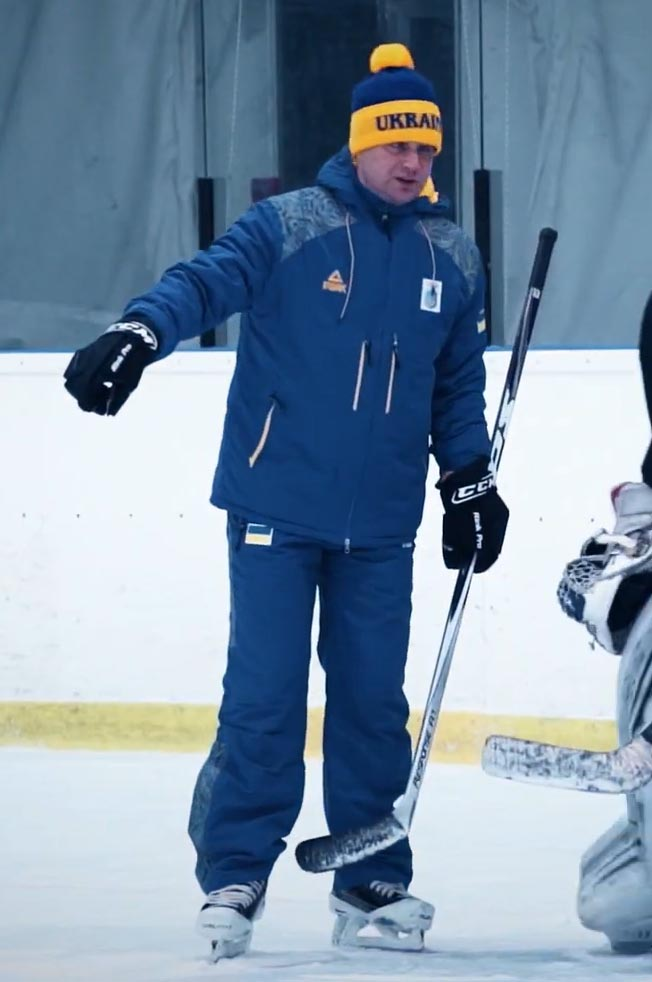
- Born: 12 April 1978 (age 48) Kiev, Ukrainian SSR, Soviet Union
- Height: 6 ft 0 in (183 cm)
- Weight: 192 lb (87 kg; 13 st 10 lb)
- Position: Goaltender
- Caught: Left
- Played for: HC Berkut-Kyiv; Sokil Kyiv; HK Liepājas Metalurgs; HK Gomel; HK Neman Grodno; HK Vitebsk; Khimvolokno Mogilev; HC Podol; HC Berkut; Kompanion Kyiv
- National team: Ukraine
- Playing career: 1994–2014
Medal record
Men's ice hockey
Representing Ukraine
Winter Universiade
Gold medal – first place	1999 Poprad	Team
Bronze medal – third place	2001 Zakopane	Team

Oleksandr Mikolayovich Fedorov (Ukrainian: Олександр Миколайович Федоров; born 12 April 1978), is a Ukrainian retired professional ice hockey player. He played for multiple teams during a career that lasted from 1994 until 2014. He also played internationally for the Ukrainian national team at the 2007 World Championship, while being named to the national team for other World Championships, as well as the 2002 Winter Olympics, though he did not play.
