= Jean-François Bonnard =

French ice hockey player

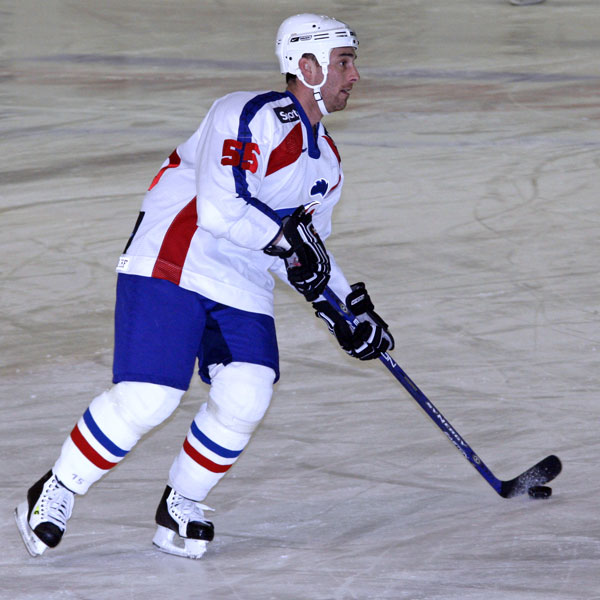
- Jean-François Bonnard in 2007

Personal information
- Nationality: French
- Born: 14 September 1971 (age 53); Grenoble, France

Sport
- Sport: Ice hockey

Jean-François Bonnard (born 14 September 1971) is a French former ice hockey defenceman. He competed in the men's tournament at the 2002 Winter Olympics.
