= Sergei Shabanov =

Belarusian ice hockey player

- Born: February 24, 1974 (age 51); Minsk, Soviet Union
- Height: 6 ft 2 in (188 cm)
- Weight: 205 lb (93 kg; 14 st 9 lb)
- Position: Goaltender
- Caught: Left
- National team: Belarus
- Playing career: 1993–2015

Sergei Rudolfovich Shabanov (born February 24, 1974) is a Belarusian professional ice hockey goaltender who participated at the 2010 IIHF World Championship as a member of the Belarus men's national ice hockey team. He also played for Belarus at the 2002 Winter Olympics in Salt Lake City.
