= Guillaume Besse (ice hockey) =

French ice hockey player

Personal information
- Born: 26 January 1976 (age 49); Paris, France

Sport
- Sport: Ice hockey

Guillaume Besse (born 26 January 1976) is a French ice hockey player. He competed in the men's tournament at the 2002 Winter Olympics.
