= Claus Dalpiaz =

Austrian former ice hockey goaltender

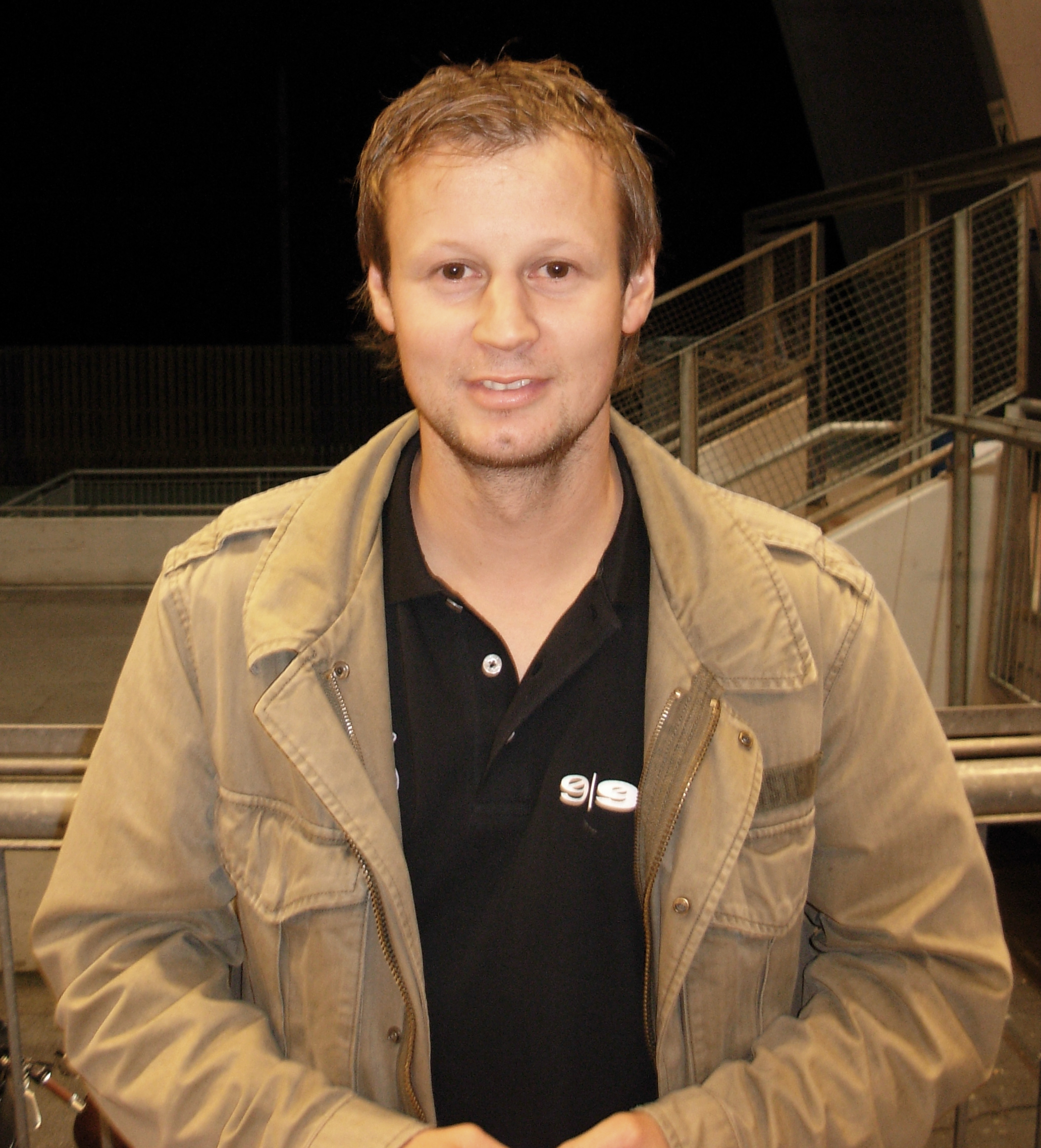
- Born: October 10, 1971 (age 54) Kufstein, AUT
- Height: 5 ft 9 in (175 cm)
- Weight: 154 lb (70 kg; 11 st 0 lb)
- Position: Goaltender
- Caught: Left
- EBHL team Former teams: Graz 99ers HC TWK Innsbruck
- National team: Austria
- Playing career: 1989–2008

Claus Dalpiaz (born October 10, 1971, in Kufstein, Austria) is an Austrian former ice hockey goaltender.

Dalpiaz began his career in Germany with two seasons with the Rosenheim Star Bulls, quickly establishing himself as the team's starting goalie. He then moved the VEU Feldkirch for three seasons before returning to the Star Bulls. In 1997 he briefly played for the Kassel Huskies but after two games with the team he returned to Rosenheim. In 1999, he departed from the Deutsche Eishockey Liga and moved to the 2nd Bundesliga to play for EC Bad Nauheim. In 2000, he went back to Austria and signed with HC TWK Innsbruck where he spent seven seasons as the team's starting goalie. He played for Graz 2007-2008 and for Starbulls Rosenheim from 2008 to 2010. Since 2011 he is trainer for HC Kufstein.
