= 2000–01 Nationalliga A season =

Swiss professional ice hockey season

The 2000–01 NLA season was the 63rd regular season of the Nationalliga A, the main professional ice hockey league in Switzerland.

== Regular season ==
=== Final standings ===
	Team	GP	W	L	T	GF	GA	Pts
1.	HC Lugano	44	28	12	4	129	185	60
2.	ZSC Lions	44	25	10	9	135	102	59
3.	HC Davos	44	24	14	6	154	103	54
4.	EV Zug	44	25	17	2	166	143	52
5.	Kloten Flyers	44	21	15	8	123	110	50
6.	SC Bern	44	20	15	9	135	102	49
7.	SC Rapperswil-Jona	44	20	21	3	135	132	43
8.	HC Fribourg-Gottéron	44	18	20	6	133	136	42
9.	SCL Tigers	44	18	20	6	110	114	42
10.	HC Ambri-Piotta	44	17	22	5	97	126	39
11.	EHC Chur	44	11	29	4	93	133	26
12.	HC La Chaux-de-Fonds	44	4	36	4	82	206	12

== Playoffs ==
=== Quarterfinals ===
HC Lugano (1) vs. Fribourg-Gottéron (8)
Away	Home	
Fribourg-Gottéron 1	2 HC Lugano	
HC Lugano 0	2 Fribourg-Gottéron	
Fribourg-Gottéron 2	3 HC Lugano	n.P.
HC Lugano 4	3 Fribourg-Gottéron	OT
Fribourg-Gottéron 2	3 HC Lugano	OT
HC Lugano wins series 4–1

HC Davos vs. SC Bern
Away	Home	
SC Bern 8	3 HC Davos	
HC Davos 1	2 SC Bern	OT
SC Bern 3	2 HC Davos	OT
HC Davos 2	4 SC Bern	
SC Bern wins series 4–0

ZSC Lions (2) vs. SC Rapperswil-Jona (7)
Away	Home
SC Rapperswil-Jona 2	5 ZSC Lions
ZSC Lions 4	1 SC Rapperswil-Jona
SC Rapperswil-Jona 0	2 ZSC Lions
ZSC Lions 8	3 SC Rapperswil-Jona
ZSC Lions wins series 4–0

EV Zug (4) vs. Kloten Flyers (5)
Away	Home
Kloten Flyers 6	2 EV Zug
EV Zug 2	3 Kloten Flyers
Kloten Flyers 3	1 EV Zug
EV Zug 0	5 Kloten Flyers
Kloten Flyers wins series 4–0

=== Semifinals ===
HC Lugano vs. SC Bern
Away	Home	
SC Bern 1	2 HC Lugano	OT
HC Lugano 1	3 SC Bern	
SC Bern 1	5 HC Lugano	
HC Lugano 2	3 SC Bern	OT
SC Bern 2	6 HC Lugano	
SC Bern 2	3 HC Lugano	n.P.
HC Lugano wins series 4–2

ZSC Lions vs. Kloten Flyers
Away	Home	
Kloten Flyers 0	1 ZSC Lions	
ZSC Lions 4	3 Kloten Flyers	OT
Kloten Flyers 1	2 ZSC Lions	
ZSC Lions 2	6 Kloten Flyers	
Kloten Flyers 1	4 ZSC Lions	
ZSC Lions wins series 4–1

=== Finals ===
HC Lugano vs. ZSC Lions
Away	Home	
ZSC Lions 0	3 HC Lugano	
HC Lugano 0	3 ZSC Lions	
ZSC Lions 1	4 HC Lugano	
HC Lugano 4	0 ZSC Lions	
ZSC Lions 6	3 HC Lugano	
HC Lugano 1	5 ZSC Lions	
ZSC Lions 2	1 HC Lugano	OT
ZSC Lions wins series 4–3
