= 2004 IIHF World Championship rosters =

Rosters at the 2004 IIHF World Championship in the Czech Republic.

== Canada ==
vlevo
Position	Player	Club
Goaltenders	Roberto Luongo	Florida Panthers
	Marc Denis	Columbus Blue Jackets
	Jean-Sébastien Giguère	Mighty Ducks of Anaheim
Defencemen	Scott Niedermayer	New Jersey Devils
	Jay Bouwmeester	Florida Panthers
	Steve Staios	Edmonton Oilers
	Eric Brewer	Edmonton Oilers
	Derek Morris	Phoenix Coyotes
	Nick Schultz	Minnesota Wild
	Willie Mitchell	Minnesota Wild
	Jamie Heward	ZSC Lions
Forwards	Ryan Smyth C	Edmonton Oilers
	Shawn Horcoff	Edmonton Oilers
	Rob Niedermayer	Mighty Ducks of Anaheim
	Glen Murray	Boston Bruins
	Brendan Morrison	Vancouver Canucks
	Matt Cooke	Vancouver Canucks
	Jean-Pierre Dumont	Buffalo Sabres
	Patrice Bergeron	Boston Bruins
	Jeff Friesen	New Jersey Devils
	Dany Heatley	Atlanta Thrashers
	Daniel Brière	Buffalo Sabres
	Brenden Morrow	Dallas Stars
	Justin Williams	Carolina Hurricanes
	Jeff Shantz	SCL Tigers
	Mario Lemieux	Pittsburgh Penguins
Coaches	Mike Babcock	
	Tom Renney	
	Todd Woodcroft	

== Sweden ==
vlevo
Position	Player	Club
Goaltenders	Daniel Henriksson	Luleå HF
	Stefan Liv	HV71
	Henrik Lundqvist	Frölunda HC
Defencemen	Christian Bäckman	St. Louis Blues
	Per Hållberg	Färjestad BK
	Niclas Hävelid	Mighty Ducks of Anaheim
	Nicklas Lidström	Detroit Red Wings
	Ronnie Sundin	Frölunda HC
	Daniel Tjärnqvist	Atlanta Thrashers
	Dick Tärnström	Pittsburgh Penguins
Forwards	Niklas Andersson	Frölunda HC
	Daniel Alfredsson	Ottawa Senators
	Per-Johan Axelsson	Boston Bruins
	Johan Davidsson	HV71
	Peter Forsberg	Colorado Avalanche
	Jonathan Hedström	Djurgårdens IF
	Jonas Höglund	HC Davos
	Andreas Johansson	Nashville Predators
	Jörgen Jönsson	Färjestad BK
	Magnus Kahnberg	Frölunda HC
	Michael Nylander	Boston Bruins
	Samuel Påhlsson	Mighty Ducks of Anaheim
	Andreas Salomonsson	Modo Hockey
	Fredrik Sjöström	Phoenix Coyotes
	Mathias Tjärnqvist	Dallas Stars
Coaches	Hardy Nilsson	
	Ulf Dahlén	
	Tommy Samuelsson	

== United States ==
vlevo
Position	Player	Club
Goaltenders	Mike Dunham	New York Rangers
	Ty Conklin	Edmonton Oilers
	Alex Westlund	Lokomotiv Yaroslavl
Defencemen	Brett Hauer	Genève-Servette HC
	Aaron Miller	Los Angeles Kings
	Eric Weinrich	St. Louis Blues
	Andy Roach	Mannheimer ERC
	Hal Gill	Boston Bruins
	Paul Mara	Phoenix Coyotes
	Keith Ballard	University of Minnesota
	Blake Sloan	Dallas Stars
	Jeff Jillson	Buffalo Sabres
Forwards	Erik Westrum	Phoenix Coyotes
	Dustin Brown	Los Angeles Kings
	Jeff Hamilton	Bridgeport Sound Tigers
	Jeff Halpern	Washington Capitals
	Ryan Malone	Pittsburgh Penguins
	Bates Battaglia	Washington Capitals
	Andy Hilbert	Boston Bruins
	Matt Cullen	Florida Panthers
	Richard Park	Minnesota Wild
	Chris Drury	Buffalo Sabres
	Mike Grier	Buffalo Sabres
	Adam Hall	Nashville Predators
Coaches	Peter Laviolette	
	Jay Leach	

== Czech Republic ==
Position	Player	Club
Goaltenders	Tomáš Vokoun	Nashville Predators
	Roman Čechmánek	Los Angeles Kings
Defencemen	Jan Novák	Slavia Prague
	Roman Hamrlík	New York Islanders
	Jiří Šlégr	Boston Bruins
	Jan Hejda	CSKA Moscow
	Martin Škoula	Mighty Ducks of Anaheim
	František Kaberle	Atlanta Thrashers
	Jaroslav Špaček	Columbus Blue Jackets
Forwards	Jaromír Jágr	New York Rangers
	Martin Straka	Los Angeles Kings C
	Martin Havlát	Ottawa Senators
	Radek Dvořák	Edmonton Oilers
	Václav Prospal	Mighty Ducks of Anaheim
	Martin Ručinský	Vancouver Canucks
	Petr Průcha	HC Moeller Pardubice
	Jiří Dopita	HC Moeller Pardubice
	Jaroslav Hlinka	Ak Bars Kazan
	David Výborný	Columbus Blue Jackets
	Josef Beránek	Slavia Prague
	Jan Hlaváč	New York Rangers
	Milan Kraft	Pittsburgh Penguins
	Michal Sup	Slavia Prague
Coaches	Slavomír Lener	
	Vladimír Růžička	
	Antonín Stavjaňa	

== Finland ==
Position	Player	Club
Goaltenders	Fredrik Norrena	Linköpings HC
	Jussi Markkanen	Edmonton Oilers
	Mika Noronen	Buffalo Sabres
Defencemen	Petteri Nummelin	HC Lugano
	Sami Salo	Vancouver Canucks
	Antti-Jussi Niemi	Frölunda HC
	Jere Karalahti	HIFK
	Tuukka Mantyla	Luleå HF
	Toni Soderholm	HIFK
	Janne Niinimaa	New York Islanders
Forwards	Niklas Hagman	Florida Panthers
	Olli Jokinen	Florida Panthers
	Tony Virta	HPK
	Ville Peltonen	HC Lugano
	Lasse Pirjeta	Pittsburgh Penguins
	Niko Kapanen	Dallas Stars
	Jari Viuhkola	Kärpät
	Antti Laaksonen	Minnesota Wild
	Jukka Hentunen	HC Fribourg-Gottéron
	Timo Parssinen	HIFK
	Kimmo Rintanen	Kloten Flyers
	Jarkko Ruutu	Vancouver Canucks
	Esa Pirnes	Los Angeles Kings
	Tomi Kallio	Frölunda HC
Coaches	Raimo Summanen	
	Erkka Westerlund	
	Jari Kurri	

== Russia ==
Position	Player	Club
Goaltenders	Alexander Fomichev	Sibir Novosibirsk
	Yegor Podomatsky	Lokomotiv Yaroslavl
	Maxim Sokolov	Avangard Omsk
Defencmen	Dmitri Bykov	Ak Bars Kazan
	Alexander Guskov	Lokomotiv Yaroslavl
	Dmitri Yushkevich	Lokomotiv Yaroslavl
	Dmitri Kalinin	Buffalo Sabres
	Maxim Kondratyev	Lada Togliatti
	Vitali Proshkin	Ak Bars Kazan
	Andrei Skopintsev	Dynamo Moscow
	Vasili Turkovsky	Ak Bars Kazan
	Oleg Tverdovsky	Avangard Omsk
Forwards	Maxim Afinogenov	Buffalo Sabres
	Vladimir Antipov	Lokomotiv Yaroslavl
	Andrei Bashkirov	Lausanne HC
	Vyacheslav Butsayev	Lokomotiv Yaroslavl
	Alexei Yashin	New York Islanders
	Ilya Kovalchuk	Atlanta Thrashers
	Alexei Morozov	Pittsburgh Penguins
	Alexander Ovechkin	Dynamo Moscow
	Alexander Prokopyev	Avangard Omsk
	Nikolai Pronin	CSKA Moscow
	Alexander Skugarev	Lada Togliatti
	Maxim Sushinsky	Avangard Omsk
	Valeri Zelepukin	SKA Saint Petersburg
Coaches	Viktor Tikhonov	
	Vladimir Yurzinov	
	Valeri Belousov	

== Slovakia ==
Position	Player	Club
Goaltenders	Rastislav Staňa	Washington Capitals
	Ján Lašák	SKA Saint Petersburg
	Karol Križan	HKm Zvolen
Defencemen	Zdeno Chára	Ottawa Senators
	Martin Štrbák	Pittsburgh Penguins
	Richard Lintner	Djurgårdens IF
	Dominik Graňák	Slavia Prague
	Branislav Mezei	Florida Panthers
	Andrej Meszároš	Dukla Trenčín
	Ivan Majeský	Atlanta Thrashers
	Ladislav Čierný	Lada Togliatti
Forwards	Jozef Stümpel	Los Angeles Kings
	Miroslav Šatan C	Buffalo Sabres
	Marián Gáborík	Minnesota Wild
	Marián Hossa	Ottawa Senators
	Pavol Demitra	St. Louis Blues
	Vladimír Országh	Nashville Predators
	Ľuboš Bartečko	Sparta Prague
	Juraj Štefanka	HC Vítkovice
	Rastislav Pavlikovský	Leksands IF
	Richard Kapuš	Luleå HF
	Ronald Petrovický	Atlanta Thrashers
	Roman Kukumberg	Dukla Trenčin
	Juraj Kolník	Florida Panthers
Coaches	František Hossa	
	Ľubomír Pokovič	
	Róbert Švehla	
