= 2005 IIHF World Championship rosters =

Rosters at the 2005 IIHF World Championships in Austria.

== Rosters ==
Typically, the World Championships are played at the same time as the Stanley Cup Playoffs are in the NHL. This causes NHL player selections to be limited to those whose seasons has ended. The 2005 Tournament had rosters made up of more top end talent, as players were available due to the NHL Lockout in 2005, which saw the season cancelled and the Stanley Cup vacated.

== Czech Republic ==
vlevo
Position	Player	Club
Goaltenders	Tomáš Vokoun	HIFK
	Milan Hnilička	Bílí Tygři Liberec
	Adam Svoboda	Sinupret Ice Tigers
Defencemen	Jiří Šlégr	Chemopetrol Litvínov
	Tomáš Kaberle	Rabat Kladno
	Pavel Kubina	HC Vítkovice
	Jaroslav Špaček	Slavia Prague
	Marek Židlický	HIFK
	Jiří Fischer	Bílí Tygři Liberec
	František Kaberle	Modo Hockey
	Jan Hejda	CSKA Moscow
Forwards	Jaromír Jágr	Avangard Omsk
	Petr Čajánek	Hamé Zlín
	Martin Ručinský	Chemopetrol Litvínov
	Radek Dvořák	HC České Budějovice
	Václav Prospal	HC České Budějovice
	Martin Straka	Lasselsberger Plzeň
	Aleš Hemský	Moeller Pardubice
	David Výborný	Sparta Prague - C
	Jan Hlaváč	Sparta Prague
	Petr Sýkora	Metallurg Magnitogorsk
	Josef Vašíček	Slavia Prague
	Václav Varaďa	HC Vítkovice
	Radim Vrbata	Bílí Tygři Liberec
	Petr Průcha	Moeller Pardubice
Coaches	Vladimír Růžička	
	Ondřej Weissmann	
	Radim Rulík	
	Marian Jelínek	

== Canada ==
vlevo
Position	Player	Club
Goaltenders	Martin Brodeur	New Jersey Devils
	Roberto Luongo	Florida Panthers
	Marty Turco	Djurgårdens IF
Defencemen	Scott Hannan	San Jose Sharks
	Ed Jovanovski	Vancouver Canucks
	Wade Redden	Ottawa Senators
	Robyn Regehr	Calgary Flames
	Dan Boyle	Djurgårdens IF
	Chris Phillips	Brynäs IF
	Sheldon Souray	Färjestad BK
	Jamie Heward	SCL Tigers
Forwards	Shane Doan	Phoenix Coyotes
	Simon Gagné	Philadelphia Flyers
	Kirk Maltby	Detroit Red Wings
	Patrick Marleau	San Jose Sharks
	Ryan Smyth	Edmonton Oilers
	Scott Walker	Nashville Predators
	Joe Thornton	HC Davos
	Rick Nash	HC Davos
	Kris Draper	Detroit Red Wings
	Brenden Morrow	Dallas Stars
	Mike Fisher	EV Zug
	Dany Heatley	Ak Bars Kazan
	Brendan Morrison	Linköpings HC
Coaches	Marc Habscheid	
	Tom Renney	
	Craig MacTavish	

== Russia ==
vlevo
Position	Player	Club
Goaltenders	Maxim Sokolov	Avangard Omsk
	Sergey Zvyagin	Neftekhimik Nizhnekamsk
	Alexander Eremenko	Dynamo Moscow
Defencemen	Denis Denisov	Ak Bars Kazan
	Sergei Gusev	Avangard Omsk
	Dmitri Kalinin	Metallurg Magnitogorsk
	Alexander Karpovtsev	Lokomotiv Yaroslavl
	Andrei Markov	Dynamo Moscow
	Vitali Proshkin	Ak Bars Kazan
	Alex Riazantsev	Lokomotiv Yaroslavl
	Sergei Vyshedkevich	Dynamo Moscow
Forwards	Maxim Afinogenov	Dynamo Moscow
	Vladimir Antipov	Lokomotiv Yaroslavl
	Pavel Datsyuk	Dynamo Moscow
	Fedor Fedorov	Metallurg Magnitogorsk
	Aleksandr Kharitonov	Dynamo Moscow
	Alexei Yashin	Lokomotiv Yaroslavl
	Ilya Kovalchuk	Ak Bars Kazan
	Alexei Kovalev	Ak Bars Kazan
	Viktor Kozlov	Lada Togliatti
	Evgeni Malkin	Metallurg Magnitogorsk
	Ivan Nepryaev	Lokomotiv Yaroslavl
	Alexander Semin	Lada Togliatti
	Alexander Ovechkin	Dynamo Moscow
	Sergei Zinovjev	Ak Bars Kazan
Coaches	Vladimir Krikunov	
	Vladimir Yurzinov	
	Boris Mikhailov	

== Finland ==
Position	Player	Club
Goaltenders	Fredrik Norrena	Linköpings HC
	Pasi Nurminen	Malmö Redhawks
	Niklas Bäckström	Kärpät
Defencemen	Lasse Kukkonen	Kärpät
	Petteri Nummelin	HC Lugano
	Kimmo Timonen	KalPa
	Ossi Väänänen	Jokerit
	Antti-Jussi Niemi	Frölunda HC
	Jere Karalahti	HIFK
	Toni Söderholm	HIFK
Forwards	Pekka Saravo	Tappara
	Jussi Jokinen	Kärpät
	Olli Jokinen	HIFK
	Niklas Hagman	HC Davos
	Ville Peltonen	HC Lugano
	Petri Pakaslahti	Jokerit
	Mikko Eloranta	SC Rapperswil-Jona
	Riku Hahl	HPK
	Jari Viuhkola	Kärpät
	Jukka Hentunen	HC Fribourg-Gottéron
	Timo Pärssinen	HIFK
	Jani Rita	HPK
	Jarkko Ruutu	HIFK
	Niko Kapanen	EV Zug
	Tomi Kallio	Frölunda HC
Coaches	Timo Jutila	
	Risto Dufva	
	Hannu Virta	

== Sweden ==
Position	Player	Club
Goaltenders	Johan Holmqvist	Brynäs IF
	Stefan Liv	HV71
	Henrik Lundqvist	Frölunda HC
Defencemen	Christian Bäckman	Frölunda HC
	Magnus Johansson	Linköpings HC
	Kenny Jönsson	Rögle BK
	Niklas Kronwall	Grand Rapids Griffins
	Sanny Lindström	Timrå IK
	Mattias Norström	AIK IF
	Thomas Rhodin	HC Fribourg-Gottéron
	Ronnie Sundin	Frölunda HC
Forwards	Daniel Alfredsson	Frölunda HC
	Per-Johan Axelsson	Frölunda HC
	Johan Franzén	Linköpings HC
	Jonathan Hedström	Timrå IK
	Jonas Höglund	Färjestad BK
	Jörgen Jönsson	Färjestad BK
	Magnus Kahnberg	Frölunda HC
	Peter Nordström	Färjestad BK
	Samuel Påhlsson	Frölunda HC
	Mikael Samuelsson	Södertälje SK
	Daniel Sedin	Modo Hockey
	Henrik Sedin	Modo Hockey
	Mattias Weinhandl	Modo Hockey
	Henrik Zetterberg	Timrå IK
Coaches	Bengt-Åke Gustafsson	
	Tommy Samuelsson	
	Janne Karlsson	

== U.S.A. ==
Position	Player	Club
Goaltenders	Rick DiPietro	New York Islanders
	Ty Conklin	Grizzly Adams Wolfsburg
	Tim Thomas	Jokerit
Defencemen	Brett Hauer	EV Zug
	Aaron Miller	Los Angeles Kings
	Jordan Leopold	Calgary Flames
	Andy Roach	HC Lugano
	John-Michael Liles	Iserlohn Roosters
	Paul Martin	HC Fribourg-Gottéron
	Ryan Suter	Milwaukee Admirals
	Hal Gill	Lukko Rauma
Forwards	Mike Modano	Dallas Stars
	Jeff Halpern	Kloten Flyers
	Brian Gionta	Albany River Rats
	Mike York	Iserlohn Roosters
	Richard Park	SCL Tigers
	David Legwand	EHC Basel
	Erik Cole	Eisbären Berlin
	Yan Stastny	Sinupret Ice Tigers
	Zach Parise	Albany River Rats
	Mike Knuble	Linköpings HC
	Adam Hall	KalPa
	Kevyn Adams	DEG Metro Stars
	Mark Parrish	New York Islanders
	Doug Weight	Frankfurt Lions
Coaches	Peter Laviolette	
	John Tortorella	
	Keith Allain	

== Slovakia ==
Position	Player	Club
Goaltenders	Rastislav Staňa	Södertälje SK
	Ján Lašák	Moeller Pardubice
	Karol Križan	HKm Zvolen
Defencemen	Zdeno Chára	Färjestad BK
	Radoslav Suchý	HK SKP Poprad
	Martin Štrbák	CSKA Moscow
	René Vydarený	Slovan Bratislava
	Ľubomír Višňovský	Slovan Bratislava
	Ivan Majeský	Sparta Prague
	Richard Lintner	HC Fribourg-Gottéron
	Dominik Graňák	Slavia Prague
	Jaroslav Obšut	Luleå HF
Forwards	Žigmund Pálffy	Slavia Prague
	Jozef Stümpel	Slavia Prague
	Miroslav Šatan C	Slovan Bratislava
	Marián Gáborík	Dukla Trenčín
	Marián Hossa	Dukla Trenčín
	Pavol Demitra	Dukla Trenčín
	Michal Handzuš	HKm Zvolen
	Richard Zedník	HKm Zvolen
	Vladimír Országh	HKm Zvolen
	Ľuboš Bartečko	Dynamo Moscow
	Marcel Hossa	Mora IK
	Juraj Štefanka	HC Vítkovice
	Peter Pucher	Znojmští Orli
Coaches	František Hossa	
	Ľubomír Pokovič	
	Róbert Švehla	
