= Jan Jensen (ice hockey) =

Danish ice hockey player

- Born: August 19, 1971 (age 55)
- Height: 6 ft 4 in (193 cm)
- Weight: 220 lb (100 kg; 15 st 10 lb)
- Position: Goaltender
- Caught: Right
- Played for: Esbjerg IK; AaB Ishockey; Vojens IK
- National team: Denmark
- Playing career: 1987–2005

Jan Jensen (born August 19, 1971) is a Danish retired ice hockey goaltender who participated at the 2003 and 2004 IIHF World Championships as a member of the Denmark men's national ice hockey team.
