= 2004 IIHF World Championship final =

Ice hockey match

	1	2	3	Total
Sweden	2	1	0	3
Canada	1	2	2	5
- Date: May 9, 2004
- Arena: Sazka Arena
- City: Prague
- Attendance: 17,360

The 2004 IIHF World Championship final was an ice hockey match that took place on May 9, 2004 in Prague, Czech Republic, to determine the winner of the 2004 IIHF World Championship. Canada defeated Sweden to win its 23rd championship.

== Details ==
9 May 2004; 20:30	Sweden	3 – 5 (2–1, 1–2, 0–2)	Canada	Sazka Arena; Attendance: 17,360

Game reference
			Referees: Henriksson; Blumel, Kautto
6 min	Penalties	20 min	Referees: Henriksson; Blumel, Kautto
31	Shots	27	Referees: Henriksson; Blumel, Kautto

== See also ==
- 2004 IIHF World Championship
- Canada men's national ice hockey team
- Sweden men's national ice hockey team
