= Brett Hauer =

American ice hockey player (born 1971)

- Born: July 11, 1971 (age 54) Richfield, Minnesota, U.S.
- Height: 6 ft 2 in (188 cm)
- Weight: 205 lb (93 kg; 14 st 9 lb)
- Position: Defense
- Shot: Right
- Played for: AIK IF; Edmonton Oilers; Nashville Predators; Genève-Servette HC; EV Zug; HC Davos; Lokomotiv Yaroslavl; EHC Basel
- National team: United States
- NHL draft: 71st overall, 1989; Vancouver Canucks
- Playing career: 1993–2008

Brett Timothy Hauer (born July 11, 1971) is an American former professional ice hockey defenseman who played parts of three seasons in the National Hockey League (NHL) for the Edmonton Oilers and Nashville Predators.

== Playing career ==
Hauer spent his amateur career with the University of Minnesota Duluth after a successful high school career, which saw him drafted in the fourth round of the 1989 NHL entry draft, 71st overall, by the Vancouver Canucks.

Hauer played for the Edmonton Oilers and Nashville Predators at the NHL level, playing a total of 37 regular season games, scoring 4 goals and 4 assists for 8 points, collecting 38 penalty minutes. In the minors, he played for six teams in the American and International Hockey Leagues, most notably with the Manitoba Moose from 1997 to 2001. He remains the highest-scoring defenseman in that franchise's history.

Later in his career, Hauer played in Europe, playing in Switzerland for Genève-Servette HC, EV Zug and HC Davos. In 2006, he played in the Russian Super League for Lokomotiv Yaroslavl. The next season though, he returned to Switzerland, playing for EHC Basel, before retiring in 2008.

== International play ==
Medal record

Representing United States

World Championships
Bronze medal – third place	2004 Czech Republic	

During his career, Hauer represented Team USA at the IIHF World Championships four times (1995, 2003, 2004 and 2005) and once at the Winter Olympics (1994).

== Career statistics ==
=== Regular season and playoffs ===
			Regular season					Playoffs
Season	Team	League	GP	G	A	Pts	PIM	GP	G	A	Pts	PIM
1987–88	Richfield High School	HS–MN	24	3	3	6		—	—	—	—	—
1988–89	Richfield High School	HS–MN	24	8	15	23	70	—	—	—	—	—
1989–90	University of Minnesota Duluth	WCHA	37	2	6	8	44	—	—	—	—	—
1990–91	University of Minnesota Duluth	WCHA	30	1	7	8	54	—	—	—	—	—
1991–92	University of Minnesota Duluth	WCHA	33	8	14	22	40	—	—	—	—	—
1992–93	University of Minnesota Duluth	WCHA	40	10	46	56	52	—	—	—	—	—
1993–94	United States	Intl	57	6	14	20	88	—	—	—	—	—
1993–94	Las Vegas Thunder	IHL	21	0	7	7	8	1	0	0	0	0
1994–95	AIK	SEL	37	1	3	4	38	—	—	—	—	—
1995–96	Edmonton Oilers	NHL	29	4	2	6	30	—	—	—	—	—
1995–96	Cape Breton Oilers	AHL	17	3	5	8	29	—	—	—	—	—
1996–97	Chicago Wolves	IHL	81	10	30	40	50	4	2	0	2	4
1997–98	Manitoba Moose	IHL	82	13	48	61	58	3	0	0	0	2
1998–99	Manitoba Moose	IHL	81	15	56	71	66	5	0	5	5	4
1999–00	Edmonton Oilers	NHL	5	0	2	2	2	—	—	—	—	—
1999–00	Manitoba Moose	IHL	77	13	47	60	92	2	0	1	1	2
2000–01	Manitoba Moose	IHL	82	17	42	59	52	13	1	9	10	12
2001–02	Manchester Monarchs	AHL	29	2	11	13	38	—	—	—	—	—
2001–02	Nashville Predators	NHL	3	0	0	0	6	—	—	—	—	—
2001–02	Milwaukee Admirals	AHL	48	6	21	27	14	—	—	—	—	—
2002–03	Genève–Servette HC	NLA	44	10	16	26	26	6	0	1	1	8
2003–04	Genève–Servette HC	NLA	47	7	24	31	42	12	1	4	5	10
2004–05	EV Zug	NLA	29	3	14	17	8	1	1	0	1	2
2005–06	HC Davos	NLA	41	13	23	36	54	15	4	8	12	16
2006–07	Lokomotiv Yaroslavl	RSL	44	4	6	10	60	7	1	3	4	0
2007–08	EHC Basel	NLA	46	5	20	25	74	—	—	—	—	—
IHL totals			424	68	230	298	326	28	3	15	18	24
NHL totals			37	4	4	8	38	—	—	—	—	—
NLA totals			207	38	97	135	204	34	6	13	19	36

=== International ===
Year	Team	Event	GP	G	A	Pts	PIM
1993	United States	WC	6	0	0	0	8
1994	United States	OG	8	0	0	0	10
1995	United States	WC	6	2	2	4	4
2003	United States	WC	6	1	1	2	2
2004	United States	WC	9	0	0	0	6
2005	United States	WC	7	2	4	6	4
Senior totals			42	5	7	12	34

== Awards and honors ==
Award	Year
College
All-WCHA First Team	1992–93
AHCA West First-Team All-American	1992–93
WCHA All-Tournament Team	1993
IHL
First All-Star Team	1999, 2000, 2001
Governor's Trophy (Best Defenseman)	2000, 2001

== Transactions ==
- August 24, 1995 - The Vancouver Canucks trade Hauer to the Edmonton Oilers in exchange for a 7th-round choice in the 1997 NHL entry draft
- July 8, 2001 - The Los Angeles Kings sign Hauer as a free agent
- December 19, 2001 - The Los Angeles Kings trade Hauer to the Nashville Predators in exchange for Rich Brennan

Awards and achievements
Preceded by Geoff Sarjeant	WCHA Student-Athlete of the Year; 1992–93	Succeeded by Brian Konowalchuk / Jeff Nielsen
