= 2003 IIHF World Championship final =

Ice hockey match

	1	2	3	OT	Total
Sweden	2	0	0	0	2
Canada	1	0	1	1	3
- Date: May 11, 2003
- Arena: Hartwall Arena
- City: Helsinki
- Attendance: 13,387

The 2003 IIHF World Championship final was an ice hockey match that took place on May 11, 2003 in Helsinki, Finland, to determine the winner of the 2003 IIHF World Championship. Canada defeated Sweden to win its 22nd championship.

== Details ==
11 May 2003; 17:00	Sweden	2 – 3 OT (2–1, 0–0, 0–1, 0–1)	Canada	Hartwall Arena; Attendance: 13,387

Game reference
			Referees: Sindler; Hämäläinen, Blumel
14 min	Penalties	10 min	Referees: Sindler; Hämäläinen, Blumel
39	Shots	33	Referees: Sindler; Hämäläinen, Blumel

== See also ==
- 2003 IIHF World Championship
- Canada men's national ice hockey team
- Sweden men's national ice hockey team
