= Dick Tärnström =

Swedish ice hockey player

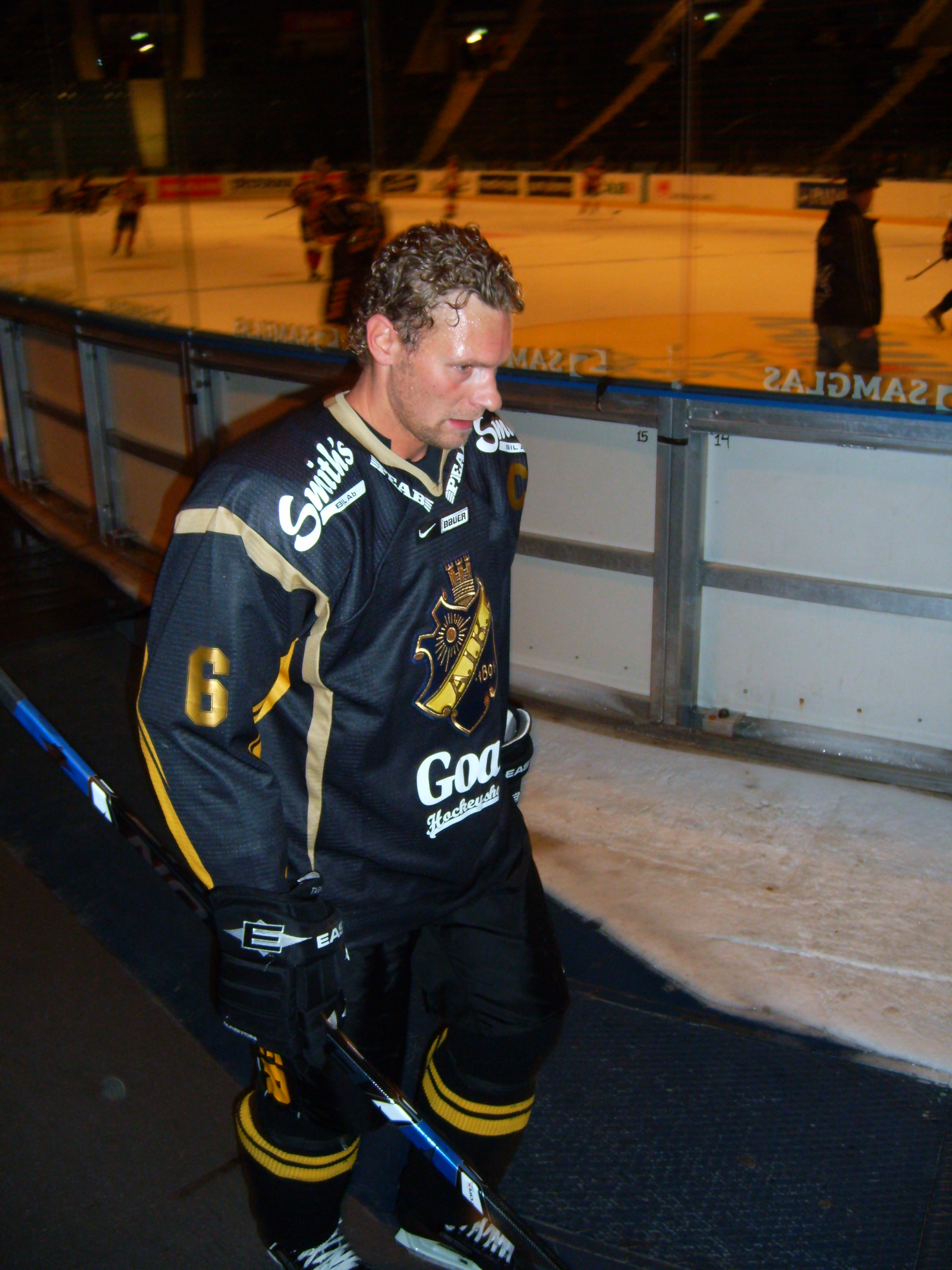
- Born: January 20, 1975 (age 51) Sundbyberg, Sweden
- Height: 6 ft 1 in (185 cm)
- Weight: 205 lb (93 kg; 14 st 9 lb)
- Position: Defense
- Shot: Left
- Played for: AIK IF; New York Islanders; Pittsburgh Penguins; Edmonton Oilers; Columbus Blue Jackets
- National team: Sweden
- NHL draft: 272nd overall, 1994; New York Islanders
- Playing career: 1992–2013

Medal record

Representing Sweden

World Championships
Silver medal – second place	2003 Finland	
Silver medal – second place	2004 Czech Republic	
Bronze medal – third place	2009 Switzerland	

World Junior Championships
Silver medal – second place	1994 Czech Republic	
Bronze medal – third place	1995 Canada	

Dick Tärnström (born January 20, 1975) is a Swedish former professional ice hockey defenceman. During the majority of his 21-year-long playing career, Tärnström played for AIK of the Swedish top-tier league Elitserien (SEL). He was the captain for AIK during the five last seasons of his career. He also spent five years in the National Hockey League (NHL), playing for the New York Islanders, Pittsburgh Penguins, Edmonton Oilers, and Columbus Blue Jackets.

In January 2013, while playing for AIK, Tärnström was forced to retire due to a spinal disc herniation injury.

== Playing career ==
Tärnström started his professional career in AIK of the Swedish top-tier league Elitserien (SEL). He was drafted as 272nd overall, in the eleventh round by the New York Islanders in the 1994 NHL entry draft.

During the 2003–04 season, he became the first defenceman in the history of the Pittsburgh Penguins to lead the team in scoring for an entire season, compiling 52 points in 80 games. The Penguins acquired Ric Jackman at the trade deadline, and the two flourished together, combining for the "Ric and Dick show" on the powerplay. Through a 2010 Pittsburgh Post-Gazette series of Penguins "Teams of the Decades" Tärnström was named to the Penguins team of the '00s. He is still the only defenceman ever to lead the Penguins in scoring for a season.

During the lockout-season, 2004–05, Tärnström played in Södertälje SK in Sweden.

Tärnström requested a trade from the Pittsburgh Penguins and on January 26, 2006, he went to the Edmonton Oilers in exchange for Cory Cross and Jani Rita.

Tärnström was part of the Cinderella Edmonton Oilers team that made a run to the Stanley Cup Finals. However, the Oilers lost in game 7 of the finals to the Carolina Hurricanes. Tärnström had 0 goals and 2 assists in the 2006 Playoffs.

During the 2006–07 season, Tärnström played with HC Lugano of the Nationalliga A.

Tärnström returned to the NHL by signing a contract with the Oilers on July 1, 2007. He was traded on February 1, 2008 to the Columbus Blue Jackets in exchange for Curtis Glencross.

In the 2008–09 season, Tärnström returned to play for AIK of the Swedish second-tier league HockeyAllsvenskan (Swe-2). He was appointed the team's captain. The plan was to help AIK promote back to the top-tier league Elitserien (SEL) due to AIK's financial problems at that time. AIK were promoted to the SEL in the 2009–10 season, and Tärnström would remain in the team until he was forced to retire in January 2013 due to a spinal disc herniation injury.

== Personal life ==
Tärnström's son Oliver Tärnström is an ice hockey centre playing for the same club as his father, AIK IF of the HockeyAllsvenskan. Oliver was drafted by the New York Rangers in the 2020 NHL entry draft in the 3rd round with the 92nd overall draft pick.

== Career statistics ==
=== Regular season and playoffs ===
			Regular season					Playoffs
Season	Team	League	GP	G	A	Pts	PIM	GP	G	A	Pts	PIM
1992–93	AIK	SEL	2	0	0	0	0	—	—	—	—	—
1992–93	AIK	Allsv	15	0	5	5	14	2	0	0	0	0
1993–94	AIK	Div.1	33	1	4	5	26	—	—	—	—	—
1994–95	AIK	SEL	37	8	4	12	26	—	—	—	—	—
1995–96	AIK	SEL	40	0	5	5	32	—	—	—	—	—
1996–97	AIK	SEL	49	5	3	8	38	7	0	1	1	6
1997–98	AIK	SEL	45	2	12	14	30	—	—	—	—	—
1998–99	AIK	SEL	47	9	14	23	36	—	—	—	—	—
1999–00	AIK	SEL	42	7	15	22	20	—	—	—	—	—
2000–01	AIK	SEL	50	10	18	28	28	5	0	0	0	8
2001–02	New York Islanders	NHL	62	3	16	19	38	5	0	0	0	2
2001–02	Bridgeport Sound Tigers	AHL	9	0	2	2	2	—	—	—	—	—
2002–03	Pittsburgh Penguins	NHL	61	7	34	41	50	—	—	—	—	—
2003–04	Pittsburgh Penguins	NHL	80	16	36	52	38	—	—	—	—	—
2004–05	Södertälje SK	SEL	50	7	18	25	46	9	1	0	1	6
2005–06	Pittsburgh Penguins	NHL	33	5	5	10	52	—	—	—	—	—
2005–06	Edmonton Oilers	NHL	22	1	3	4	24	12	0	2	2	10
2006–07	HC Lugano	NLA	44	3	26	29	90	5	1	6	7	8
2007–08	Edmonton Oilers	NHL	29	1	4	5	40	—	—	—	—	—
2007–08	Columbus Blue Jackets	NHL	19	2	7	9	12	—	—	—	—	—
2008–09	AIK	Allsv	38	9	23	32	68	10	1	8	9	12
2009–10	AIK	Allsv	42	9	23	32	74	10	2	7	9	10
2010–11	AIK	SEL	50	6	10	16	36	8	0	4	4	0
2011–12	AIK	SEL	46	8	18	26	38	11	2	1	3	8
2012–13	AIK	SEL	6	0	3	3	6	—	—	—	—	—
SEL totals			466	62	120	182	336	40	3	6	9	28
NHL totals			306	35	105	140	254	17	0	2	2	12

=== International ===
Year	Team	Event	GP	G	A	Pts	PIM
1993	Sweden	EJC	6	2	3	5	4
1994	Sweden	WJC	7	5	0	5	4
1995	Sweden	WJC	5	2	2	4	4
2003	Sweden	WC	9	1	3	4	0
2004	Sweden	WCH	2	0	0	0	0
2004	Sweden	WC	9	4	2	6	6
2007	Sweden	WC	9	1	8	9	14
2009	Sweden	WC	8	2	1	3	16
Junior totals			18	9	5	14	12
Senior totals			37	8	14	22	36
