= 2004 IIHF World Championship =

2004 edition of the IIHF World Championship

Tournament details
- Host country: Czech Republic
- Venues: 2 (in 2 host cities)
- Dates: 24 April – 9 May
- Opened by: Václav Klaus
- Teams: 16

Final positions
- Champions: Canada (23rd title)
- Runners-up: Sweden
- Third place: United States
- Fourth place: Slovakia

Tournament statistics
- Games played: 56
- Goals scored: 286 (5.11 per game)
- Attendance: 552,097 (9,859 per game)
- Scoring leader: (Canada) Dany Heatley (11 points)

The 2004 IIHF Ice Hockey World Championship was held between 24 April and 9 May 2004 in Prague and Ostrava, Czech Republic.

It was the 68th ice Hockey World Championships, and was run by the International Ice Hockey Federation (IIHF).

== Qualification ==
Far Eastern Qualification for the tournament was held on 6 September 2003 in Tokyo, Japan.

All times are local.

6 September 2003; 18:00	Japan	4–1 (1–1, 1–0, 2–0)	South Korea	Tokyo

== Final tournament ==
=== Venues ===
Prague	2004 IIHF World Championship is located in Czech Republic	Ostrava
Sazka Arena; Capacity: 17,360	2004 IIHF World Championship is located in Czech Republic	ČEZ Arena; Capacity: 9,568

=== Preliminary round ===
Sixteen participating teams were placed in the following four groups. After playing a round-robin, the top three teams in each group advanced to the qualifying round while the last team competed in the relegation round.

All times are local (UTC+2).

==== Group A ====
Pos	Team	Pld	W	D	L	GF	GA	GD	Pts	Qualification
1	Czech Republic (H)	3	3	0	0	15	2	+13	6	Qualifying round
2	Latvia	3	1	1	1	5	5	0	3	Qualifying round
3	Germany	3	1	1	1	6	8	−2	3	Qualifying round
4	Kazakhstan	3	0	0	3	3	14	−11	0	Relegation round

Source: Global Sports Archive
(H) Hosts

24 April 2004; 16:15	Latvia	1–3 (0–3, 0–0, 1–0)	Czech Republic	Sazka Arena, Prague

Game reference
8 min	Penalties	12 min
24	Shots	38

24 April 2004; 20:15	Germany	4–2 (0–0, 2–1, 2–1)	Kazakhstan	Sazka Arena, Prague; Attendance: 14,310

Game reference
8 min	Penalties	12 min
32	Shots	21

26 April 2004; 16:15	Germany	1–1 (0–1, 1–0, 0–0)	Latvia	Sazka Arena, Prague; Attendance: 14,150

Game reference
8 min	Penalties	12 min
24	Shots	23

26 April 2004; 20:15	Czech Republic	7–0 (5–0, 0–0, 2–0)	Kazakhstan	Sazka Arena, Prague; Attendance: 15,056

Game reference
16 min	Penalties	22 min
36	Shots	18

27 April 2004; 20:15	Kazakhstan	1–3 (0–0, 1–0, 0–3)	Latvia	Sazka Arena, Prague; Attendance: 8,388

Game reference
12 min	Penalties	6 min
15	Shots	30

28 April 2004; 20:15	Czech Republic	5–1 (1–0, 0–1, 4–0)	Germany	Sazka Arena, Prague; Attendance: 17,360

Game reference
16 min	Penalties	20 min
32	Shots	11

==== Group B ====
Pos	Team	Pld	W	D	L	GF	GA	GD	Pts	Qualification
1	Slovakia	3	2	1	0	10	5	+5	5	Qualifying round
2	Finland	3	2	0	1	11	8	+3	4	Qualifying round
3	United States	3	1	1	1	12	8	+4	3	Qualifying round
4	Ukraine	3	0	0	3	2	14	−12	0	Relegation round

Source: Global Sports Archive

24 April 2004; 12:15	Slovakia	2–0 (2–0, 0–0, 0–0)	Ukraine	ČEZ Aréna, Ostrava; Attendance: 7,797

Game reference
10 min	Penalties	6 min
31	Shots	22

24 April 2004; 20:15	Finland	4–2 (0–2, 2–0, 2–0)	United States	ČEZ Aréna, Ostrava; Attendance: 7,478

Game reference
18 min	Penalties	6 min
34	Shots	17

26 April 2004; 16:15	Finland	5–1 (2–1, 1–0, 2–0)	Ukraine	ČEZ Aréna, Ostrava; Attendance: 8,306

Game reference
8 min	Penalties	32 min
52	Shots	11

26 April 2004; 20:15	United States	3–3 (0–1, 3–2, 0–0)	Slovakia	ČEZ Aréna, Ostrava; Attendance: 8,310

Game reference
37 min	Penalties	16 min
32	Shots	36

28 April 2004; 12:15	Ukraine	1–7 (0–3, 0–2, 1–2)	United States	ČEZ Aréna, Ostrava; Attendance: 2,587

Game reference
12 min	Penalties	6 min
17	Shots	32

28 April 2004; 20:15	Slovakia	5–2 (2–1, 1–1, 2–0)	Finland	ČEZ Aréna, Ostrava; Attendance: 7,751

Game reference
6 min	Penalties	4 min
32	Shots	21

==== Group C ====
Pos	Team	Pld	W	D	L	GF	GA	GD	Pts	Qualification
1	Sweden	3	3	0	0	13	4	+9	6	Qualifying round
2	Russia	3	2	0	1	14	6	+8	4	Qualifying round
3	Denmark	3	1	0	2	7	14	−7	2	Qualifying round
4	Japan	3	0	0	3	5	15	−10	0	Relegation round

Source: Global Sports Archive

24 April 2004; 16:15	Denmark	1–5 (1–2, 0–1, 0–2)	Sweden	ČEZ Aréna, Ostrava; Attendance: 6,204

Game reference
20 min	Penalties	14 min
15	Shots	29

25 April 2004; 16:15	Russia	6–2 (2–0, 2–2, 2–0)	Denmark	ČEZ Aréna, Ostrava; Attendance: 4,624

Game reference

Maxim Sokolov
Goalies
Jan Jensen
Peter Hirsch
Referee:
(Finland) Hannu Henriksson
Linesmen:
(Canada) Dean Laschowski
(Norway) Lars Kronborg

Yashin (Proshkin) – 11:58	1–0
Bashkirov (Antipov) – 18:25	2–0
	2–1	25:35 – Staal (F. Nielsen, Green) (PP2)
Skugarev (Guskov) (PP) – 29:07	3–1
Sushinsky (Kalinin) – 36:32	4–1
	4–2	37:45 – Green (J. Nielsen)
Ovechkin (Sushinsky, Yushkevich) – 42:51	5–2
Prokopiev (Tverdovsky, Ovechkin) (PP) – 57:57	6–2

12 min
Penalties
6 min
28
Shots
20

25 April 2004; 20:15	Sweden	5–1 (2–1, 2–0, 1–0)	Japan	ČEZ Aréna, Ostrava; Attendance: 4,498

Game reference
10 min	Penalties	14 min
45	Shots	14

27 April 2004; 16:15	Japan	3–4 (2–2, 1–1, 0–1)	Denmark	ČEZ Aréna, Ostrava; Attendance: 4,569

Game reference
20 min	Penalties	30 min
26	Shots	32

27 April 2004; 20:15	Sweden	3–2 (1–0, 0–2, 2–0)	Russia	ČEZ Aréna, Ostrava; Attendance: 7,428

Game reference

Henrik Lundqvist
Goalies
Maxim Sokolov
Referee:
(Czech Republic) Vladimír Šindler
Linesmen:
(Norway) Lars Kronborg
(Germany) Thomas Gemeinhardt

Tärnström (Hävelid) – 17:32	1–0
	1–1	21:35 – Kovalchuk (Yashin, Zelepukin) (PP)
	1–2	28:08 – Kovalchuk (Morozov)
Nylander (Alfredsson) – 53:16	2–2
Jönsson (Axelsson, Tjärnqvist) – 58:27	3–2

16 min
Penalties
14 min
23
Shots
26

28 April 2004; 16:15	Russia	6–1 (4–1, 1–0, 1–0)	Japan	ČEZ Aréna, Ostrava; Attendance: 4,040

Game reference

Yegor Podomatsky
Goalies
Jiro Nihei
Referee:
(Switzerland) Danny Kurmann
Linesmen:
(Poland) Paweł Meszyński
(Switzerland) Karol Popovic

Afinogenov (Butsayev) – 02:03	1–0
Morozov (Guskov) – 02:41	2–0
	2–1	10:49 – Yule
Skopintsev (Afinogenov) – 03:47	3–1
Kovalchuk (Zelepukin, Proshkin) – 10:10	4–1
	4–2
Sushinsky (Kovalchuk, Yashin) – 27:52	5–2
Guskov (Skugarev) – 46:53	6–2

2 min
Penalties
6 min
33
Shots
22

==== Group D ====
Pos	Team	Pld	W	D	L	GF	GA	GD	Pts	Qualification
1	Canada	3	2	1	0	8	3	+5	5	Qualifying round
2	Austria	3	1	2	0	12	6	+6	4	Qualifying round
3	Switzerland	3	1	1	1	11	7	+4	3	Qualifying round
4	France	3	0	0	3	0	15	−15	0	Relegation round

Source: Global Sports Archive

24 April 2004; 12:15	France	0–6 (0–2, 0–1, 0–3)	Austria	Sazka Arena, Prague; Attendance: 3,609

Game reference
8 min	Penalties	10 min
16	Shots	30

25 April 2004; 16:15	Switzerland	6–0 (0–0, 4–0, 2–0)	France	Sazka Arena, Prague; Attendance: 8,712

Game reference
16 min	Penalties	24 min
42	Shots	20

25 April 2004; 20:15	Austria	2–2 (1–0, 1–0, 0–2)	Canada	Sazka Arena, Prague; Attendance: 10,486

Game reference
14 min	Penalties	16 min
21	Shots	28

27 April 2004; 12:15	Canada	3–0 (2–0, 1–0, 0–0)	France	Sazka Arena, Prague; Attendance: 6,629

Game reference
10 min	Penalties	18 min
38	Shots	19

27 April 2004; 16:15	Switzerland	4–4 (0–0, 1–4, 3–0)	Austria	Sazka Arena, Prague; Attendance: 8,909

Game reference
14 min	Penalties	10 min
32	Shots	31

28 April 2004; 16:15	Canada	3–1 (0–0, 2–0, 1–1)	Switzerland	Sazka Arena, Prague; Attendance: 14,892

Game reference
8 min	Penalties	28 min
34	Shots	22

=== Qualifying round ===
The top three teams in the standings of each group of the preliminary round advance to the qualifying round, and are placed in two groups: teams from Groups A and D compete in Group E, while teams from Groups B and C compete in Group F.

Each team is to play three games in this round, one against each of the three teams from the other group with which they have been paired. These three games, along with the two games already played against the other two advancing teams from the same group in the preliminary round, will count in the qualifying round standings.

The top four teams in both groups E and F advanced to the Playoff round.

==== Group E ====
Pos	Team	Pld	W	D	L	GF	GA	GD	Pts	Qualification
1	Czech Republic (H)	5	5	0	0	19	5	+14	10	Quarterfinals
2	Canada	5	3	1	1	15	10	+5	7	Quarterfinals
3	Latvia	5	1	2	2	8	9	−1	4	Quarterfinals
4	Switzerland	5	1	2	2	8	11	−3	4	Quarterfinals
5	Germany	5	1	1	3	6	14	−8	3	
6	Austria	5	0	2	3	9	16	−7	2	

Source: IIHF
(H) Hosts

30 April 2004; 16:15	Canada	2–0 (1–0, 1–0, 0–0)	Latvia	Sazka Arena, Prague; Attendance: 13,533

Game reference
10 min	Penalties	8 min
32	Shots	33

30 April 2004; 20:15	Czech Republic	2–0 (0–0, 1–0, 1–0)	Austria	Sazka Arena, Prague; Attendance: 16,505

Game reference
8 min	Penalties	14 min
28	Shots	14

1 May 2004; 16:15	Latvia	1–1 (0–0, 0–0, 1–1)	Switzerland	Sazka Arena, Prague; Attendance: 11,870

Game reference
26 min	Penalties	14 min
23	Shots	25

1 May 2004; 20:15	Austria	1–3 (0–1, 0–1, 1–1)	Germany	Sazka Arena, Prague; Attendance: 12,120

Game reference
10 min	Penalties	10 min
33	Shots	30

2 May 2004; 16:15	Switzerland	1–3 (0–0, 1–2, 0–1)	Czech Republic	Sazka Arena, Prague; Attendance: 17,100

Game reference
28 min	Penalties	22 min
18	Shots	44

2 May 2004; 20:15	Canada	6–1 (3–0, 2–1, 1–0)	Germany	Sazka Arena, Prague; Attendance: 14,015

Game reference
35 min	Penalties	14 min
39	Shots	21

3 May 2004; 16:15	Latvia	5–2 (0–1, 3–1, 2–0)	Austria	Sazka Arena, Prague; Attendance: 14,261

Game reference
8 min	Penalties	29 min
26	Shots	18

3 May 2004; 20:15	Czech Republic	6–2 (2–0, 1–1, 3–1)	Canada	Sazka Arena, Prague; Attendance: 17,360

Game reference
18 min	Penalties	20 min
34	Shots	23

4 May 2004; 16:15	Germany	0–1 (0–0, 0–1, 0–0)	Switzerland	Sazka Arena, Prague; Attendance: 8,556

Game reference
10 min	Penalties	14 min
27	Shots	23

==== Group F ====
Pos	Team	Pld	W	D	L	GF	GA	GD	Pts	Qualification
1	Slovakia	5	3	2	0	18	5	+13	8	Quarterfinals
2	Sweden	5	3	2	0	12	5	+7	8	Quarterfinals
3	Finland	5	3	1	1	17	8	+9	7	Quarterfinals
4	United States	5	2	1	2	17	15	+2	5	Quarterfinals
5	Russia	5	1	0	4	10	14	−4	2	
6	Denmark	5	0	0	5	6	33	−27	0	

Source: IIHF

30 April 2004; 16:15	Sweden	1–1 (0–0, 0–1, 1–0)	Finland	ČEZ Aréna, Ostrava; Attendance: 7,097

Game reference
4 min	Penalties	10 min
29	Shots	15

30 April 2004; 20:15	Slovakia	2–0 (0–0, 2–0, 0–0)	Russia	ČEZ Aréna, Ostrava; Attendance: 7,568

Game reference
Ján Lašák	Goalies	Maxim Sokolov	Referee: (Sweden) Christer Lärking; Linesmen: (United Kingdom) Matthew Folka (Germany) Thomas Gemeinhardt
Hossa (Demitra) – 25:22 / 1–0; Petrovický (Pavlikovský, Hossa) – 39:09 / 2–0			Referee: (Sweden) Christer Lärking; Linesmen: (United Kingdom) Matthew Folka (Germany) Thomas Gemeinhardt
12 min	Penalties	24 min	Referee: (Sweden) Christer Lärking; Linesmen: (United Kingdom) Matthew Folka (Germany) Thomas Gemeinhardt
23	Shots	18	Referee: (Sweden) Christer Lärking; Linesmen: (United Kingdom) Matthew Folka (Germany) Thomas Gemeinhardt

1 May 2004; 16:15	Finland	6–0 (2–0, 2–0, 2–0)	Denmark	ČEZ Aréna, Ostrava; Attendance: 5,492

Game reference
6 min	Penalties	10 min
41	Shots	17

1 May 2004; 20:15	Russia	2–3 (0–1, 2–0, 0–2)	United States	ČEZ Aréna, Ostrava; Attendance: 6,512

Game reference

Maxim Sokolov
Goalies
Ty Conklin
Referee:
(Czech Republic) Vladimír Šindler
Linesmen:
(Czech Republic) Petr Blümel
(Canada) Dean Laschowski

	0–1	08:54 – Brown (Cullen)
Yushkevich – 28:01	1–1
Bashkirov (Guskov) (PP) – 34:41	2–1
	2–2	49:54 – Malone (Roach)
	2–3	55:25 – Drury (Grier) (SH)

12 min
Penalties
12 min
35
Shots
35

2 May 2004; 16:15	Denmark	0–8 (0–3, 0–4, 0–1)	Slovakia	ČEZ Aréna, Ostrava; Attendance: 7,345

Game reference
35 min	Penalties	8 min
15	Shots	53

2 May 2004; 20:15	Sweden	3–1 (1–0, 0–1, 2–0)	United States	ČEZ Aréna, Ostrava; Attendance: 6,205

Game reference
14 min	Penalties	16 min
40	Shots	21

3 May 2004; 16:15	Finland	4–0 (0–0, 1–0, 3–0)	Russia	ČEZ Aréna, Ostrava; Attendance: 6,944

Game reference

Mika Noronen
Goalies
Yegor Podomatsky
Referee:
(Canada) Nicolas Dutil
Linesmen:
(Norway) Lars Kronborg
(Switzerland) Karol Popovic

Hentunen (Niinimaa) – 34:20	1–0
Kapanen (Hentunen, Niemi) – 45:26	2–0
Kallio (Niinimaa) – 54:15	3–0
Nummelin (Kapanen, Niinimaa) (PP) – 58:36	4–0

24 min
Penalties
14 min
27
Shots
19

3 May 2004; 20:15	Slovakia	0–0 (0–0, 0–0, 0–0)	Sweden	ČEZ Aréna, Ostrava; Attendance: 7,962

Game reference
6 min	Penalties	14 min
21	Shots	19

4 May 2004; 20:15	United States	8–3 (4–3, 4–0, 0–0)	Denmark	Sazka Arena, Prague; Attendance: 8,612

Game reference
10 min	Penalties	10 min
55	Shots	23

=== Relegation round ===
Pos	Team	Pld	W	D	L	GF	GA	GD	Pts	Relegation
1	Kazakhstan	3	2	1	0	12	5	+7	5	
2	Ukraine	3	1	2	0	10	6	+4	4	
3	Japan	3	0	2	1	7	9	−2	2	IIHF World Championship Division I
4	France	3	0	1	2	4	13	−9	1	IIHF World Championship Division I

Source: IIHF

30 April 2004; 12:15	Kazakhstan	5–0 (2–0, 3–0, 0–0)	France	Sazka Arena, Prague; Attendance: 2,402

Game reference
12 min	Penalties	10 min
25	Shots	34

30 April 2004; 12:15	Ukraine	2–2 (0–0, 1–0, 1–2)	Japan	ČEZ Aréna, Ostrava; Attendance: 681

Game reference
20 min	Penalties	12 min
39	Shots	19

1 May 2004; 12:15	Japan	3–5 (2–1, 0–3, 1–1)	Kazakhstan	Sazka Arena, Prague; Attendance: 3,620

Game reference
16 min	Penalties	12 min
23	Shots	23

2 May 2004; 12:15	Ukraine	6–2 (2–1, 0–0, 4–1)	France	Sazka Arena, Prague; Attendance: 4,203

Game reference
14 min	Penalties	8 min
22	Shots	28

3 May 2004; 12:15	Kazakhstan	2–2 (1–1, 0–0, 1–1)	Ukraine	Sazka Arena, Prague; Attendance: 3,110

Game reference
6 min	Penalties	4 min
22	Shots	21

4 May 2004; 12:15	France	2–2 (0–2, 2–0, 0–0)	Japan	Sazka Arena, Prague; Attendance: 3,050

Game reference
12 min	Penalties	6 min
29	Shots	28

=== Playoff round ===
==== Bracket ====
Quarterfinals
5 May
Czech Republic	2
United States (GWS)	3
5 May
Sweden	4
Latvia	1
6 May
Slovakia	3
Switzerland	1
6 May
Canada (OT)	5
Finland	4

Semifinals
8 May
United States	2
Sweden	3
8 May
Slovakia	1
Canada	2

Final
9 May
Sweden	3
Canada	5
Third place
9 May
Slovakia	0
United States (GWS)	1

==== Quarterfinals ====
5 May 2004; 16:15	Sweden	4–1 (3–0, 0–0, 1–1)	Latvia	Sazka Arena, Prague; Attendance: 15,920

Game reference

Henrik Lundqvist
Goalies
Artūrs Irbe
Referee:
(Canada) Nicolas Dutil
Linesmen:
(Norway) Lars Kronborg
(Slovakia) Milan Mášik

Höglund (Alfredsson, Nylander) (PP) – 02:38	1–0
Alfredsson (SH) – 15:42	2–0
Tärnström (PP2) – 19:57	3–0
	3–1	41:11 – Ignatjevs (Macijevskis) (PP)
Axelsson (SH) – 49:09	4–1

22 min
Penalties
18 min
38
Shots
24

5 May 2004; 20:15	Czech Republic	2–3 GWS (0–0, 2–1, 0–1) (OT: 0–0) (SO: 0–1)	United States	Sazka Arena, Prague; Attendance: 17,360

Game reference

Tomáš Vokoun
Goalies
Ty Conklin
Referee:
(Finland) Hannu Henriksson
Linesmen:
(Finland) Juha Kautto
(Canada) Dean Laschowski

Škoula (Dopita) – 23:15	1–0
Jágr (PP) – 26:04	2–0
	2–1	30:19 – Park (Cullen)
	2–2	51:01 – Westrum (Battaglia)

Shootout
Roach
10 min
Penalties
10 min
43
Shots
37

6 May 2004; 16:15	Canada	5–4 OT (0–2, 3–1, 1–1) (OT: 1–0)	Finland	Sazka Arena, Prague; Attendance: 15,615

Game reference

Roberto Luongo
Goalies
Mika Noronen
Referee:
(Germany) Richard Schütz
Linesmen:
(Czech Republic) Petr Blümel
(Sweden) Leo Takula

	0–1	06:09 – Peltonen (Jokinen) (PP)
	0–2	07:48 – Kallio (Peltonen)
Heatley (Brière, Brewer) (PP2) – 24:27	1–2
Bouwmeester (Heatley) – 28:25	2–2
	2–3	37:12 – Niemi (Jokinen, Peltonen)
Brewer (Brière) – 39:15	3–3
	3–4	41:55 – Rintanen (Salo, Hentunen)
Staios (Horcoff) – 46:02	4–4
Heatley – 65:33	5–4

12 min
Penalties
10 min
37
Shots
41

6 May 2004; 20:15	Slovakia	3–1 (0–1, 2–0, 1–0)	Switzerland	Sazka Arena, Prague; Attendance: 16,905

Game reference

Ján Lašák
Goalies
Martin Gerber
Referee:
(Russia) Alexander Poliakov
Linesmen:
(United States) Peter Feola
(Czech Republic) Roman Pouzar

	0–1	09:34 – Wichser (Wirz)
Štrbák (Čierny, Šatan) (PP) – 31:15	1–1
Chára (Hossa) – 37:44	2–1
Demitra (Lintner) (PP) – 49:05	3–1

10 min
Penalties
18 min
27
Shots
21

==== Semifinals ====
8 May 2004; 16:15	Slovakia	1–2 (0–0, 1–1, 0–1)	Canada	Sazka Arena, Prague; Attendance: 17,204

Game reference

Ján Lašák
Goalies
Roberto Luongo
Referee:
(United States) Rick Looker
Linesmen:
(United States) Peter Feola
(Norway) Lars Kronborg

Šatan (Štrbák) – 20:10	1–0
	1–1	32:18 – Brière (Morris, Morrow) (PP)
	1–2	46:10 – Horcoff (Staios)

6 min
Penalties
12 min
29
Shots
16

8 May 2004; 20:15	United States	2–3 (0–2, 1–1, 1–0)	Sweden	Sazka Arena, Prague; Attendance: 17,215

Game reference

Mike Dunham
Goalies
Henrik Lundqvist
Referee:
(Canada) Nicolas Dutil
Linesmen:
(Czech Republic) Petr Blümel
(Finland) Juha Kautto

	0–1	00:18 – Tärnström (Påhlsson)
	0–2	18:58 – Höglund (Nylander, Axelsson) (PP)
Park (Hall, Westrum) – 31:06	1–2
	1–3	39:44 – Axelsson (Lidström) (PP)
Halpern (Drury) (EA) – 59:24	2–3

12 min
Penalties
8 min
24
Shots
28

==== Bronze medal game ====
9 May 2004; 16:15	Slovakia	0–1 GWS (0–0, 0–0, 0–0) (OT: 0–0) (SO: 0–1)	United States	Sazka Arena, Prague; Attendance: 16,152

Game reference
			Referee: (Sweden) Christer Lärking; Linesmen: (Finland) Leo Takula (Canada) Dean Laschowski
	Shootout	Roach	Referee: (Sweden) Christer Lärking; Linesmen: (Finland) Leo Takula (Canada) Dean Laschowski
14 min	Penalties	16 min	Referee: (Sweden) Christer Lärking; Linesmen: (Finland) Leo Takula (Canada) Dean Laschowski
25	Shots	35	Referee: (Sweden) Christer Lärking; Linesmen: (Finland) Leo Takula (Canada) Dean Laschowski

==== Gold medal game ====
9 May 2004; 20:30	Sweden	3–5 (2–1, 1–2, 0–2)	Canada	Sazka Arena, Prague; Attendance: 17,360

Game reference

Henrik Lundqvist
Goalies
Roberto Luongo
Referee:
(Finland) Hannu Henriksson
Linesmen:
(Czech Republic) Petr Blümel
(Finland) Juha Kautto

Höglund (Tärnström) (PP) – 02:13	1–0
Alfredsson (Forsberg) – 07:34	2–0
	2–1	13:58 – Smyth (Morrison)
Salomonsson (Höglund, Nylander) – 24:57	3–1
	3–2	34:44 – Heatley (Bouwmeester, S. Niedermayer)
	3–3	35:36 – R. Niedermayer (Horcoff)
	3–4	40:20 – Bouwmeester (Heatley)
	3–5	50:12 – Cooke (R. Niedermayer, Horcoff)

6 min
Penalties
20 min
31
Shots
27

== Ranking and statistics ==
2004 IIHF World Championship winners

Canada
23rd title

=== Tournament Awards ===
- Best players selected by the directorate:
  - Best Goaltender: (United States) Ty Conklin
  - Best Defenceman: (Sweden) Dick Tärnström
  - Best Forward: (Canada) Dany Heatley
  - Most Valuable Player: (Canada) Dany Heatley
- Media All-Star Team:
  - Goaltender: (Sweden) Henrik Lundqvist
  - Defence: (Slovakia) Zdeno Chára, (Sweden) Dick Tärnström
  - Forwards: (Canada) Dany Heatley, (Czech Republic) Jaromír Jágr, (Finland) Ville Peltonen

=== Final standings ===
The final standings of the tournament according to IIHF:

Gold medal	Canada
Silver medal	Sweden
Bronze medal	United States
4	Slovakia
5	Czech Republic
6	Finland
7	Latvia
8	Switzerland
9	Germany
10	Russia
11	Austria
12	Denmark
13	Kazakhstan
14	Ukraine
15	Japan
16	France

=== Scoring leaders ===
List shows the top skaters sorted by points, then goals. If the list exceeds 10 skaters because of a tie in points, all of the tied skaters are left out.

Player	GP	G	A	Pts	+/−	PIM	POS
(Canada) Dany Heatley	9	8	3	11	+3	4	F
(Finland) Ville Peltonen	7	4	6	10	+6	2	F
(Czech Republic) Jaromír Jágr	7	5	4	9	+2	6	F
(Czech Republic) Martin Ručinský	7	5	4	9	+5	6	F
(Finland) Olli Jokinen	7	5	3	8	+6	6	F
(United States) Richard Park	9	5	3	8	+5	0	F
(Slovakia) Pavol Demitra	9	4	4	8	+5	4	F
(Slovakia) Miroslav Šatan	9	4	4	8	+4	4	F
(Canada) Daniel Brière	9	2	6	8	+2	6	F
(Canada) Shawn Horcoff	9	3	4	7	+4	8	F
(Czech Republic) Václav Prospal	7	3	4	7	+5	2	F

Source: IIHF.com

=== Leading goaltenders ===
Only the top five goaltenders, based on save percentage, who have played 40% of their team's minutes are included in this list.

Player	MIP	SOG	GA	GAA	SVS%	SO
(Slovakia) Ján Lašák	538:37	195	9	1.00	95.38	4
(Czech Republic) Tomáš Vokoun	380:00	126	7	1.11	94.44	2
(United States) Ty Conklin	300:00	152	10	2.00	93.42	1
(Switzerland) Martin Gerber	358:20	162	11	1.84	93.21	2
(Latvia) Artūrs Irbe	300:00	120	9	1.80	92.50	0

Source: IIHF.com

== IIHF honors and awards ==
The 2004 IIHF Hall of Fame induction ceremony has held in Prague during the World Championships. Aggie Kukulowicz of Canada was given the Paul Loicq Award for outstanding contributions to international ice hockey.

IIHF Hall of Fame inductees

- Rudi Ball, Germany
- Mike Buckna, Canada
- Ove Dahlberg, Sweden
- Vitali Davydov, Russia
- Ladislav Horský, Slovakia
- Yury Karandin, Russia
- Tsutomu Kawabuchi, Japan
- Lou Nanne, United States
- Ronald Pettersson, Sweden
- Nikolai Sologubov, Russia
- Miroslav Šubrt, Czech Republic
- František Tikal, Czech Republic

== See also ==
- IIHF World Championship
