= Aleksandr Guskov =

Russian ice hockey player (born 1976)

- Born: November 26, 1976 (age 49) Nizhny Novgorod, Russia
- Height: 6 ft 2 in (188 cm)
- Weight: 212 lb (96 kg; 15 st 2 lb)
- Position: Defence
- Shot: Left
- Played for: Lada Togliatti; Traktor Chelyabinsk; Neftekhimik Nizhnekamsk; Lokomotiv Yaroslavl; Ak Bars Kazan; Avangard Omsk; CSKA Moscow; Severstal Cherepovets
- National team: Russia
- NHL draft: 200th overall, 2003; Columbus Blue Jackets
- Playing career: 1994–2015

Alexander Guskov (born November 26, 1976) is a Russian former professional ice hockey defenceman. He was selected by the Columbus Blue Jackets in the 7th round (200th overall) of the 2003 NHL entry draft.

With a career spanning over 20 years, Guskov between 2007 and 2017 played as a journeyman for multiple teams in the Russian Superleague (RSL) and then the Kontinental Hockey League.

== Career statistics ==
=== Regular season and playoffs ===
			Regular season					Playoffs
Season	Team	League	GP	G	A	Pts	PIM	GP	G	A	Pts	PIM
1994–95	Torpedo–2 Nizhny Novgorod	RUS.2	55	4	2	6	28	—	—	—	—	—
1995–96	Motor Zavolzhye	RUS.2	56	5	9	14	50	—	—	—	—	—
1996–97	Motor Zavolzhye	RUS.2	52	5	5	10	40	—	—	—	—	—
1997–98	Motor Zavolzhye	RUS.2	24	2	4	6	26	—	—	—	—	—
1997–98	Lada Togliatti	RSL	10	0	1	1	8	1	0	1	1	2
1997–98	Lada–2 Togliatti	RUS.3	5	0	0	0	4	—	—	—	—	—
1998–99	Traktor Chelyabinsk	RSL	11	2	0	2	4	—	—	—	—	—
1998–99	Lada Togliatti	RSL	30	1	3	4	10	5	0	0	0	4
1999–2000	Neftekhimik Nizhnekamsk	RSL	36	4	18	22	50	4	0	0	0	4
2000–01	Neftekhimik Nizhnekamsk	RSL	43	4	8	12	26	4	0	0	0	0
2001–02	Lokomotiv Yaroslavl	RSL	51	9	9	18	28	9	1	2	3	2
2002–03	Lokomotiv Yaroslavl	RSL	48	10	17	27	32	10	1	1	2	6
2003–04	Lokomotiv Yaroslavl	RSL	51	9	12	21	18	3	0	0	0	0
2004–05	Ak Bars Kazan	RSL	18	3	4	7	52	—	—	—	—	—
2004–05	Avangard Omsk	RSL	35	4	9	13	47	9	1	1	2	4
2005–06	Avangard Omsk	RSL	44	4	3	7	50	13	0	1	1	6
2006–07	Lada Togliatti	RSL	54	17	16	33	50	3	1	2	3	2
2007–08	Lokomotiv Yaroslavl	RSL	38	7	8	15	38	13	0	2	2	10
2008–09	Lokomotiv Yaroslavl	KHL	56	15	15	30	74	17	1	3	4	14
2009–10	Lokomotiv Yaroslavl	KHL	56	9	16	25	46	17	6	3	9	10
2010–11	Lokomotiv Yaroslavl	KHL	54	19	19	38	58	17	0	4	4	30
2011–12	CSKA Moscow	KHL	51	9	19	28	48	5	0	1	1	2
2012–13	CSKA Moscow	KHL	14	1	4	5	8	—	—	—	—	—
2012–13	Lokomotiv Yaroslavl	KHL	33	4	9	13	18	6	2	2	4	4
2013–14	Traktor Chelyabinsk	KHL	15	1	3	4	16	—	—	—	—	—
2013–14	Chelmet Chelyabinsk	VHL	2	0	1	1	0	—	—	—	—	—
2013–14	Severstal Cherepovets	KHL	12	0	3	3	22	—	—	—	—	—
2014–15	Neftekhimik Nizhnekamsk	KHL	3	0	0	0	2	—	—	—	—	—
RSL totals			469	74	108	182	413	74	4	10	14	40
KHL totals			294	58	88	146	292	62	9	13	22	60

=== International ===
Year	Team	Event	Result	GP	G	A	Pts	PIM
2002	Russia	WC	2nd place, silver medalist(s)	9	0	1	1	6
2003	Russia	WC	7th	6	0	0	0	4
2004	Russia	WC	10th	9	1	3	4	6
Senior totals				24	1	4	5	16
