= Jonas Höglund =

Swedish ice hockey player

- Born: August 29, 1972 (age 53) Karlstad, Sweden
- Height: 6 ft 4 in (193 cm)
- Weight: 214 lb (97 kg; 15 st 4 lb)
- Position: Right wing
- Shot: Right
- Played for: Färjestad BK; Calgary Flames; Montreal Canadiens; Toronto Maple Leafs; HC Davos; HC Lugano; Södertälje SK
- National team: Sweden
- NHL draft: 222nd overall, 1992; Calgary Flames
- Playing career: 1988–2010

Jonas Kent Lennart Höglund (born August 29, 1972) is a Swedish former professional ice hockey player who played in the National Hockey League (NHL) with the Calgary Flames, Montreal Canadiens and the Toronto Maple Leafs. In October 2025, he was named a scout for the Los Angeles Kings

== Playing career ==
Höglund was drafted by the Calgary Flames in the 1992 NHL entry draft in the 10th round as the 222nd pick overall. He then also played Färjestads BK and played with them until 1996 when he joined Calgary Flames. In February 1998 the Flames traded Höglund and Zarley Zalapski to the Montreal Canadiens for Valeri Bure and a draft pick.

In July 1999, Höglund joined the Toronto Maple Leafs as a free agent. He played with the Leafs for four seasons. During his tenure with the Leafs, he often played on a line with countryman Mats Sundin, along with Mikael Renberg, which were also one of the lines in Tre Kronor. While Höglund's lack of scoring touch often frustrated fans, his hard work was consistently rewarded with first line ice time by head coach Pat Quinn. In September 2003, he signed a contract with the Florida Panthers in the National Hockey League (NHL). After failing to make the Panthers' roster, he left and played the 2003–04 season with the Swiss club HC Davos. After one year with Davos, Höglund went back to Sweden and Färjestads BK.

Höglund ended his 22-year professional career in the lower leagues in Sweden, playing his final season with Skåre BK of the Hockeyettan in 2009–10 season.

== International play ==
Medal record

Representing Sweden

Ice hockey

World Championships
Silver medal – second place	1997 Finland	
Silver medal – second place	2003 Finland	
Silver medal – second place	2004 Czech Republic	

World Junior Championships
Silver medal – second place	1992 Germany	

European Junior Championship
Gold medal – first place	1990 Sweden	

He has played for the Swedish national team in the World Championship in 1997, 2003, 2004 and 2005. In 1997, 2003 and 2004 he and the Swedish national team finished in second place. All three times Canada won gold.

== Career statistics ==
=== Regular season and playoffs ===
			Regular season					Playoffs
Season	Team	League	GP	G	A	Pts	PIM	GP	G	A	Pts	PIM
1988–89	Färjestads BK	SEL	1	0	0	0	0	—	—	—	—	—
1989–90	Färjestads BK	SEL	2	0	0	0	0	—	—	—	—	—
1990–91	Färjestads BK	SEL	40	5	5	10	4	8	1	0	1	0
1991–92	Färjestads BK	SEL	40	14	11	25	6	6	2	4	6	2
1992–93	Färjestads BK	SEL	40	13	13	26	14	3	1	0	1	0
1993–94	Färjestads BK	SEL	22	7	2	9	10	—	—	—	—	—
1994–95	Färjestads BK	SEL	40	14	12	26	16	4	3	2	5	0
1995–96	Färjestads BK	SEL	40	32	11	43	18	8	2	1	3	6
1996–97	Calgary Flames	NHL	68	19	16	35	12	—	—	—	—	—
1997–98	Calgary Flames	NHL	50	6	8	14	16	—	—	—	—	—
1997–98	Montreal Canadiens	NHL	28	6	5	11	6	10	2	0	2	0
1998–99	Montreal Canadiens	NHL	74	8	10	18	16	—	—	—	—	—
1999–2000	Toronto Maple Leafs	NHL	82	29	27	56	10	12	2	4	6	2
2000–01	Toronto Maple Leafs	NHL	82	23	26	49	14	10	0	0	0	4
2001–02	Toronto Maple Leafs	NHL	82	13	34	47	26	20	4	6	10	2
2002–03	Toronto Maple Leafs	NHL	79	13	19	32	12	7	0	1	1	8
2003–04	HC Davos	NLA	34	24	19	43	20	1	0	0	0	0
2004–05	Färjestads BK	SEL	49	15	17	32	24	15	4	7	11	8
2005–06	Färjestads BK	SEL	49	10	14	24	24	15	5	9	14	10
2006–07	Färjestads BK	SEL	55	20	12	32	18	9	4	5	9	10
2007–08	Färjestads BK	SEL	36	2	2	9	32	—	—	—	—	—
2007–08	HC Lugano	NLA	10	6	2	8	4	—	—	—	—	—
2008–09	Malmö Redhawks	Allsv	35	24	12	36	16	—	—	—	—	—
2008–09	Södertälje SK	SEL	7	2	2	4	2	—	—	—	—	—
2009–10	Skåre BK	Div.1	7	4	5	9	0	—	—	—	—	—
2018–19	Hammarö HC	Div.2	1	0	0	0	0	—	—	—	—	—
SEL totals			422	134	106	240	168	68	22	28	50	36
NHL totals			545	117	145	262	112	59	8	11	19	8
NLA totals			44	30	21	51	24	1	0	0	0	0

=== International ===
Year	Team	Event	Result	GP	G	A	Pts	PIM
1990	Sweden	EJC18	1st place, gold medalist(s)	6	2	0	2	0
1992	Sweden	WJC	2nd place, silver medalist(s)	7	3	2	5	0
1997	Sweden	WC	2nd place, silver medalist(s)	11	4	3	7	4
2003	Sweden	WC	2nd place, silver medalist(s)	9	2	2	4	0
2004	Sweden	WC	2nd place, silver medalist(s)	9	5	1	6	2
2005	Sweden	WC	4th	9	2	4	6	4
Junior totals				13	5	2	7	0
Senior totals				38	13	10	23	10
