= Dmitri Yushkevich =

Russian ice hockey player (born 1971)

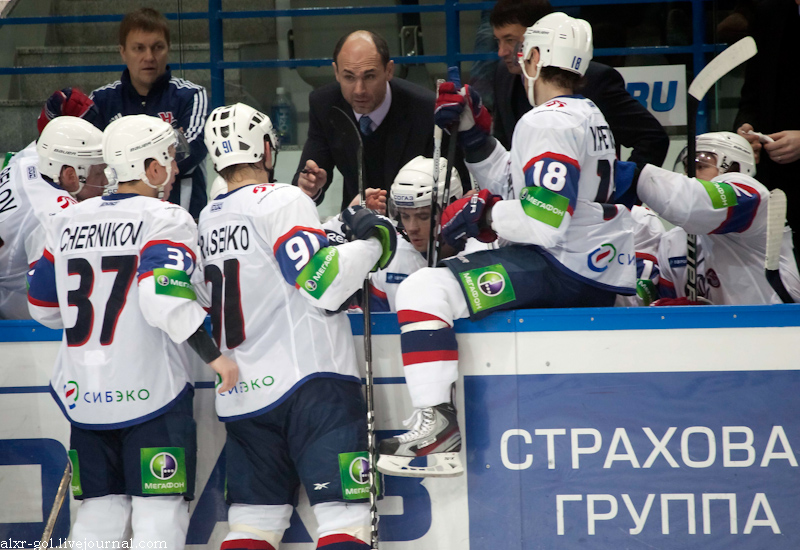
- Born: 19 November 1971 (age 54) Cherepovets, Russian SFSR, Soviet Union
- Height: 5 ft 11 in (180 cm)
- Weight: 207 lb (94 kg; 14 st 11 lb)
- Position: Defence
- Shot: Right
- Played for: Philadelphia Flyers; Toronto Maple Leafs; Florida Panthers; Los Angeles Kings; HC Dynamo Moscow; Lokomotiv Yaroslavl; HC Severstal; Metallurg Magnitogorsk; SKA Saint Petersburg; HC Sibir Novosibirsk; Kärpät
- National team: Russia, Unified Team and Soviet Union
- NHL draft: 122nd overall, 1991; Philadelphia Flyers
- Playing career: 1988–2010

Olympic medal record

Men's Ice Hockey
| Gold medal – first place | 1992 | Ice Hockey |
| Silver medal – second place | 1998 | Ice Hockey |

Dmitri Sergeyevich Yushkevich (Russian: Дмитрий Серге́евич Юшкевич; born 19 November 1971) is a Russian former professional ice hockey defenceman. He spent eleven seasons in the National Hockey League (NHL) with four different teams, but most notably for the Toronto Maple Leafs.

== Playing career ==
Dmitri Yushkevich was drafted in the sixth round, 122nd overall, by the Philadelphia Flyers in the 1991 NHL entry draft. After winning a gold medal at the 1992 Winter Olympics, Yushkevich made his NHL debut with the Flyers in the 1992–93 season. He appeared in all 82 games in his rookie season, tallying five goals and adding 27 assists. After three seasons with the Flyers, Yushkevich was traded to the Toronto Maple Leafs before the 1995–96 season.

In Toronto, Yushkevich blossomed into a top-pair caliber NHL defenceman, particularly under the guidance of coach Pat Quinn, who joined the team in 1998. Between 1998–99 and 2001–02, Yushkevich also emerged as the leader of the Maple Leafs' defense corps. During the 1999 playoffs, Yushkevich paired up with Danny Markov to neutralize Penguins' superstar Jaromír Jágr, thus helping the Leafs advance to the Eastern Conference finals. Yushkevich earned a spot in the 2000 NHL All-Star game, which took place in Toronto. In February 2002, Yushkevich was diagnosed with a life-threatening blood clot. As a result, Yushkevich was forced to miss the rest of the 2001–02 season. Despite Yushkevich's pleas to accept the risk and re-join the club in time for the playoffs, he was not cleared to play by the team. As a Maple Leaf, Yushkevich totalled 506 regular season games and 44 playoff games. His performances with the Leafs earned him a reputation of a warrior, a grinder, and an expert shot-blocker. He was traded to the Florida Panthers before the 2002–03 season for Róbert Švehla.

After only 23 games with the Panthers, Yushkevich was traded again. The Los Angeles Kings acquired him, along with a draft pick, in exchange for Andreas Lilja and Jaroslav Bednář. Yushkevich would join his third team of the 2002–03 season in March, when the Kings traded him back to Philadelphia for a pair of draft picks.

In the 2003–04 season, Yushkevich returned to Russia to play for Lokomotiv Yaroslavl of the Russian Superleague. He then joined his hometown Severstal Cherepovets for the 2004–05 season before moving on to Metallurg Magnitogorsk for the 2005–06 season. For the 2006–07 season, he played for SKA St. Petersburg. He then returned to his hometown team of Severstal Cherepovets.

Yushkevich decided to retire in January 2008 after the death of his first wife Oksana so that he could take care of their three children.

Yushkevich was a member of the Russian national team at the 1998 Winter Olympics, earning a silver medal.

Yushkevich has since come out of retirement and is playing for Sibir Novosibirsk of the recently formed Kontinental Hockey League (KHL). He led all defenceman on the team in scoring.

On the 3rd of November 2009 it was announced that the Finnish hockey team Kärpät have recruited him.

Yushkevich was named among 145 other inductees as the first group to be inducted into the Russian Hockey Hall of Fame on February 17, 2014.

== Career statistics ==
=== Regular season and playoffs ===
| | | | Regular season | | | | | Playoffs |
| Season | Team | League | GP | G | A | Pts | PIM | GP | G | A | Pts | PIM |
|---|---|---|---|---|---|---|---|---|---|---|---|---|
| 1988–89 | Torpedo Yaroslavl | USSR | 23 | 2 | 1 | 3 | 8 | — | — | — | — | — |
| 1989–90 | Torpedo Yaroslavl | USSR | 41 | 2 | 3 | 5 | 39 | — | — | — | — | — |
| 1990–91 | Torpedo Yaroslavl | USSR | 41 | 10 | 4 | 14 | 22 | — | — | — | — | — |
| 1990–91 | ShVSM Yaroslavl | USSR.3 | 1 | 0 | 0 | 0 | 0 | — | — | — | — | — |
| 1991–92 | Dynamo Moscow | CIS | 35 | 5 | 7 | 12 | 14 | 6 | 1 | 0 | 1 | 0 |
| 1991–92 | Dynamo–2 Moscow | CIS.3 | 1 | 0 | 0 | 0 | 0 | — | — | — | — | — |
| 1992–93 | Philadelphia Flyers | NHL | 82 | 5 | 27 | 32 | 71 | — | — | — | — | — |
| 1993–94 | Philadelphia Flyers | NHL | 75 | 5 | 25 | 30 | 86 | — | — | — | — | — |
| 1994–95 | Torpedo Yaroslavl | IHL | 10 | 3 | 4 | 7 | 8 | — | — | — | — | — |
| 1994–95 | Philadelphia Flyers | NHL | 40 | 5 | 9 | 14 | 47 | 15 | 1 | 5 | 6 | 12 |
| 1995–96 | Toronto Maple Leafs | NHL | 69 | 1 | 10 | 11 | 54 | 4 | 0 | 0 | 0 | 0 |
| 1996–97 | Toronto Maple Leafs | NHL | 74 | 4 | 10 | 14 | 56 | — | — | — | — | — |
| 1997–98 | Toronto Maple Leafs | NHL | 72 | 0 | 12 | 12 | 78 | — | — | — | — | — |
| 1998–99 | Toronto Maple Leafs | NHL | 78 | 6 | 22 | 28 | 88 | 17 | 1 | 5 | 6 | 22 |
| 1999–00 | Torpedo Yaroslavl | RSL | 7 | 2 | 3 | 5 | 2 | — | — | — | — | — |
| 1999–00 | Toronto Maple Leafs | NHL | 77 | 3 | 24 | 27 | 55 | 12 | 1 | 1 | 2 | 4 |
| 2000–01 | Toronto Maple Leafs | NHL | 81 | 5 | 19 | 24 | 52 | 11 | 0 | 4 | 4 | 12 |
| 2001–02 | Toronto Maple Leafs | NHL | 55 | 6 | 13 | 19 | 26 | — | — | — | — | — |
| 2002–03 | Florida Panthers | NHL | 23 | 1 | 6 | 7 | 14 | — | — | — | — | — |
| 2002–03 | Los Angeles Kings | NHL | 42 | 0 | 3 | 3 | 24 | — | — | — | — | — |
| 2002–03 | Philadelphia Flyers | NHL | 18 | 2 | 2 | 4 | 8 | 13 | 1 | 4 | 5 | 2 |
| 2003–04 | Lokomotiv Yaroslavl | RSL | 35 | 7 | 11 | 18 | 36 | 3 | 0 | 2 | 2 | 4 |
| 2003–04 | Lokomotiv–2 Yaroslavl | RUS.3 | 2 | 0 | 1 | 1 | 2 | — | — | — | — | — |
| 2004–05 | Severstal Cherepovets | RSL | 54 | 6 | 22 | 28 | 58 | — | — | — | — | — |
| 2005–06 | Metallurg Magnitogorsk | RSL | 49 | 8 | 21 | 29 | 38 | 11 | 5 | 10 | 15 | 2 |
| 2006–07 | SKA Saint Petersburg | RSL | 36 | 1 | 9 | 10 | 38 | — | — | — | — | — |
| 2007–08 | Severstal Cherepovets | RSL | 29 | 0 | 2 | 2 | 22 | — | — | — | — | — |
| 2008–09 | Sibir Novosibirsk | KHL | 56 | 6 | 20 | 26 | 74 | — | — | — | — | — |
| 2009–10 | Kärpät | SM-l | 41 | 4 | 14 | 18 | 20 | 8 | 0 | 4 | 4 | 10 |
| USSR/CIS totals | | | 142 | 19 | 16 | 35 | 83 | 6 | 1 | 0 | 1 | 0 |
| NHL totals | | | 786 | 43 | 182 | 225 | 659 | 72 | 4 | 19 | 23 | 52 |
| RSL totals | | | 210 | 24 | 71 | 95 | 194 | 14 | 5 | 12 | 17 | 6 |

=== International ===
| Year | Team | Event | Result | GP | G | A | Pts | PIM |
|---|---|---|---|---|---|---|---|---|
| 1989 | Soviet Union | EJC | 1st place, gold medalist(s) | 6 | 3 | 2 | 5 | 16 |
| 1989 | Soviet Union | WJC | 1st place, gold medalist(s) | 7 | 0 | 3 | 3 | 2 |
| 1990 | Soviet Union | WJC | 2nd place, silver medalist(s) | 7 | 0 | 4 | 4 | 8 |
| 1991 | Soviet Union | WJC | 2nd place, silver medalist(s) | 7 | 2 | 4 | 6 | 2 |
| 1992 | Unified Team | OG | 1st place, gold medalist(s) | 8 | 1 | 2 | 3 | 4 |
| 1992 | Russia | WC | 5th | 6 | 1 | 1 | 2 | 4 |
| 1993 | Russia | WC | 1st place, gold medalist(s) | 7 | 1 | 4 | 5 | 10 |
| 1994 | Russia | WC | 5th | 6 | 1 | 2 | 3 | 12 |
| 1996 | Russia | WCH | SF | 5 | 1 | 1 | 2 | 2 |
| 1998 | Russia | OG | 2nd place, silver medalist(s) | 6 | 0 | 0 | 0 | 2 |
| 1998 | Russia | WC | 5th | 6 | 2 | 2 | 4 | 4 |
| 2004 | Russia | WC | 10th | 6 | 1 | 1 | 2 | 6 |
| Junior totals | | | | 27 | 5 | 13 | 18 | 28 |
| Senior totals | | | | 50 | 8 | 13 | 21 | 44 |

== Awards ==
- Champion of CIS: 1992 (With Dinamo)
- NHL All-Star Game winner: 2000
- Russian champion: 2007 (With Metallurg Magnitogorsk)
- Winner of Turnir Puchkova: 2007
