= Andrei Bashkirov =

Russian ice hockey player (born 1970)

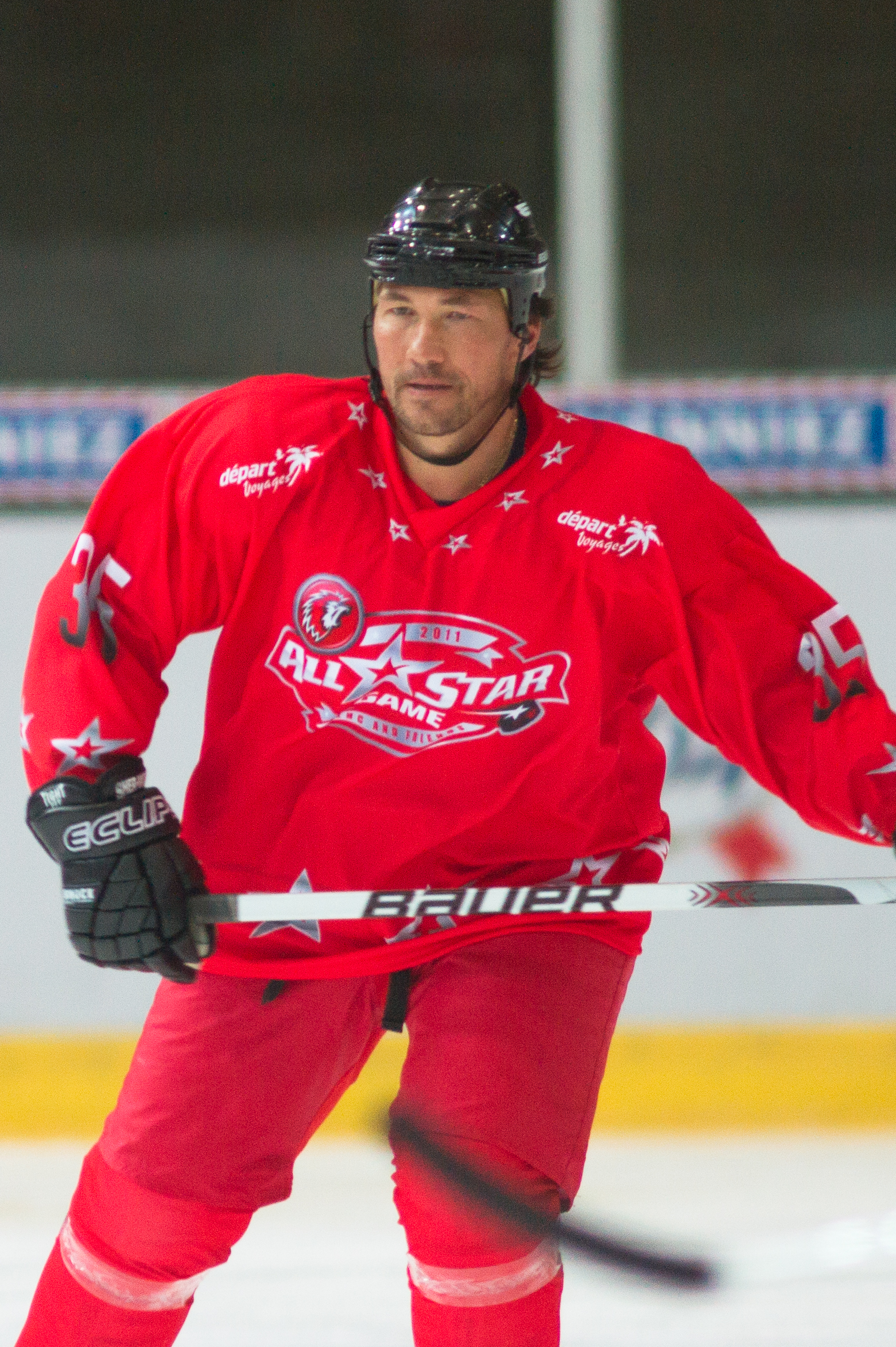
- Andreï Bachkirov
- Born: 22 June 1970 (age 55) Shelekhov, Russian SFSR, Soviet Union
- Height: 6 ft 0 in (183 cm)
- Weight: 194 lb (88 kg; 13 st 12 lb)
- Position: Right wing
- Shot: Left
- Played for: Montreal Canadiens; Khimik Voskresensk; Lausanne HC; Severstal Cherepovets; HC Fribourg-Gottéron; Avangard Omsk; HC MVD; Sibir Novosibirsk
- National team: Russia
- NHL draft: 132nd overall, 1998; Montreal Canadiens
- Playing career: 1991–2009

Andrei Valerievich Bashkirov (Russian: Андрей Валерьевич Башкиров; born June 22, 1970) is a Russian former professional ice hockey player. He played right wing.

== Playing career ==
Bashkirov played 30 games for the Montreal Canadiens, earning just three assists. He has played in various leagues during his career in both Europe and North America.

== Career statistics ==
=== Regular season and playoffs ===
			Regular season					Playoffs
Season	Team	League	GP	G	A	Pts	PIM	GP	G	A	Pts	PIM
1989–90	Yermak Angarsk	USSR-3	26	2	0	2	16	—	—	—	—	—
1990–91	Yermak Angarsk	USSR-3	52	27	9	36	18	—	—	—	—	—
1991–92	Khimik Voskresensk	USSR	11	2	0	2	4	—	—	—	—	—
1991–92	Yermak Angnarsk	USSR-3	38	18	6	24	4	—	—	—	—	—
1992–93	Yermak Angnarsk	RUS-2	45	28	3	31	16	—	—	—	—	—
1993–94	Providence Bruins	AHL	1	0	0	0	2	—	—	—	—	—
1993–94	Charlotte Checkers	ECHL	62	28	42	70	25	3	1	0	1	2
1994–95	Charlotte Checkers	ECHL	61	19	27	46	20	3	0	0	0	0
1995–96	Huntington Blizzard	ECHL	55	19	39	58	35	—	—	—	—	—
1996–97	Huntington Blizzard	ECHL	47	29	41	70	12	—	—	—	—	—
1996–97	Detroit Vipers	IHL	2	0	0	0	0	—	—	—	—	—
1996–97	Las Vegas Thunder	IHL	27	10	12	22	0	2	0	0	0	0
1997–98	Las Vegas Thunder	IHL	15	2	3	5	5	—	—	—	—	—
1997–98	Port Huron Border Cats	UHL	3	1	3	4	0	—	—	—	—	—
1997–98	Fort Wayne Komets	IHL	65	28	48	76	16	4	2	2	4	2
1998–99	Montreal Canadiens	NHL	10	0	0	0	0	—	—	—	—	—
1998–99	Fredericton Canadiens	AHL	13	7	5	12	4	—	—	—	—	—
1998–99	Fort Wayne Komets	IHL	34	11	25	36	10	—	—	—	—	—
1999–00	Quebec Citadelles	AHL	78	28	33	61	17	3	0	3	3	0
1999–00	Montreal Canadiens	NHL	2	0	0	0	0	—	—	—	—	—
2000–01	Quebec Citadelles	AHL	50	16	23	39	6	—	—	—	—	—
2000–01	Montreal Canadiens	NHL	18	0	3	3	0	—	—	—	—	—
2001–02	Lausanne HC	NLA	32	7	19	26	8	5	0	6	6	2
2002–03	Lausanne HC	NLA	43	10	20	30	14	—	—	—	—	—
2003–04	Lausanne HC	NLA	56	26	34	12	4	4	5	9	14
2004–05	Lausanne HC	NLA	20	6	6	12	29	—	—	—	—	—
2004–05	Severstal Cherepovets	RSL	22	1	2	3	0	—	—	—	—	—
2005–06	HC Fribourg-Gottéron	NLA	18	3	11	14	6	—	—	—	—	—
2005–06	Lausanne HC	NLB	5	1	1	2	2	—	—	—	—	—
2006–07	Lausanne HC	NLB	4	3	1	4	2	—	—	—	—	—
2006–07	Avangard Omsk	RSL	32	6	6	12	2	11	1	0	1	4
2007–08	HC MVD	RSL	57	15	19	34	32	3	1	0	1	0
2008–09	Sibir Novosibirsk	KHL	26	0	1	1	2	—	—	—	—	—
NHL totals			30	0	3	3	0	—	—	—	—	—
RSL totals			111	22	27	49	34	14	2	0	2	4

=== International ===
Year	Team	Event	GP	G	A	Pts	PIM
2004	Russia	WC	6	2	0	2	2
Senior totals			6	2	0	2	2
