= 2003–04 Nationalliga A season =

Swiss professional ice hockey season

The 2003–04 NLA season was the 66th regular season of the Nationalliga A, the main professional ice hockey league in Switzerland.

== Regular season ==
=== Final standings ===
| | Team | GP | W | L | T | GF | GA | Pts |
|---|---|---|---|---|---|---|---|---|
| 1. | HC Lugano | 48 | 35 | 9 | 4 | 196 | 127 | 74 |
| 2. | SC Bern | 48 | 31 | 12 | 5 | 176 | 113 | 67 |
| 3. | Genève-Servette HC | 48 | 26 | 16 | 6 | 148 | 123 | 58 |
| 4. | HC Davos | 48 | 24 | 17 | 7 | 166 | 132 | 55 |
| 5. | ZSC Lions | 48 | 25 | 19 | 4 | 140 | 121 | 54 |
| 6. | HC Ambri-Piotta | 48 | 22 | 20 | 6 | 153 | 141 | 50 |
| 7. | EV Zug | 48 | 21 | 22 | 5 | 117 | 147 | 47 |
| 8. | HC Fribourg-Gottéron | 48 | 22 | 23 | 3 | 152 | 135 | 47 |
| 9. | Kloten Flyers | 48 | 22 | 23 | 3 | 151 | 131 | 47 |
| 10. | SC Rapperswil-Jona | 48 | 16 | 27 | 5 | 136 | 163 | 37 |
| 11. | HC Lausanne | 48 | 15 | 30 | 3 | 116 | 171 | 33 |
| 12. | SCL Tigers | 48 | 13 | 29 | 6 | 119 | 175 | 32 |
| 13. | EHC Basel | 48 | 9 | 34 | 5 | 116 | 207 | 23 |

=== Scoring leaders ===
Note: GP = Games played; G = Goals; A = Assists; Pts = Points; PIM = Penalty Minutes

| Player | Team | GP | G | A | Pts | PIM |
|---|---|---|---|---|---|---|
| Ville Peltonen | HC Lugano | 48 | 28 | 44 | 72 | 16 |
| Mike Maneluk | HC Lugano | 48 | 30 | 41 | 71 | 85 |
| Jean-Guy Trudel | HC Ambri-Piotta | 47 | 30 | 38 | 68 | 66 |
| Mikael Karlberg | HC Fribourg-Gottéron | 48 | 18 | 48 | 66 | 30 |
| Hnat Domenichelli | HC Ambri-Piotta | 42 | 27 | 32 | 59 | 84 |
| Petteri Nummelin | HC Lugano | 48 | 20 | 39 | 59 | 59 |
| Oleg Petrov | Genève-Servette HC | 48 | 24 | 32 | 56 | 97 |
| Andre Bashkirov | HC Lausanne | 48 | 24 | 31 | 55 | 10 |
| Jukka Hentunen | HC Fribourg-Gottéron | 47 | 25 | 28 | 53 | 22 |
| Jan Alston | ZSC Lions | 45 | 22 | 31 | 53 | 36 |

== Playoffs ==
=== Quarterfinals ===
HC Lugano (1) vs. Fribourg-Gottéron (8)
| Away | Home |
|---|---|
| Fribourg-Gottéron 2 | 7 HC Lugano |
| HC Lugano 4 | 2 Fribourg-Gottéron |
| Fribourg-Gottéron 1 | 2 HC Lugano |
| HC Lugano 6 | 3 Fribourg-Gottéron |
HC Lugano wins series 4–0

Genève-Servette HC (3) vs. HC Ambri-Piotta (6)
| Away | Home |
|---|---|
| HC Ambri-Piotta 2 | 4 Genève-Servette HC |
| Genève-Servette HC 2 | 1 HC Ambri-Piotta |
| HC Ambri-Piotta 3 | 1 Genève-Servette HC |
| Genève-Servette HC 2 | 4 HC Ambri-Piotta |
| HC Ambri-Piotta 1 | 4 Genève-Servette HC |
| Genève-Servette HC 2 | 3 HC Ambri-Piotta |
| HC Ambri-Piotta 0 | 2 Genève-Servette HC |
Genève-Servette HC wins series 4–3

SC Bern (2) vs. EV Zug (7)
| Away | Home |
|---|---|
| EV Zug 1 | 4 SC Bern |
| SC Bern 2 | 5 EV Zug |
| EV Zug 2 | 5 SC Bern |
| SC Bern 2 | 1 EV Zug |
| EV Zug 2 | 5 SC Bern |
SC Bern wins series 4–1

HC Davos (4) vs. ZSC Lions (5)
| Away | Home |
|---|---|
| ZSC Lions 3 | 1 HC Davos |
| HC Davos 1 | 0 ZSC Lions |
| ZSC Lions 2 | 3 HC Davos |
| HC Davos 3 | 4 ZSC Lions |
| ZSC Lions 2 | 0 HC Davos |
| HC Davos 1 | 2 ZSC Lions |
ZSC Lions wins series 4–2

=== Semifinals ===
HC Lugano vs. ZSC Lions
| Away | Home |
|---|---|
| ZSC Lions 1 | 5 HC Lugano |
| HC Lugano 2 | 5 ZSC Lions |
| ZSC Lions 3 | 2 HC Lugano |
| HC Lugano 1 | 2 ZSC Lions |
| ZSC Lions 0 | 4 HC Lugano |
| HC Lugano 4 | 3 ZSC Lions |
| ZSC Lions 2 | 4 HC Lugano |
HC Lugano wins series 4–3

SC Bern vs. Genève-Servette HC
| Away | Home |
|---|---|
| Genève-Servette HC 2 | 4 SC Bern |
| SC Bern 4 | 1 Genève-Servette HC |
| Genève-Servette HC 3 | 5 SC Bern |
| SC Bern 1 | 3 Genève-Servette HC |
| Genève-Servette HC 1 | 2 SC Bern |
SC Bern wins series 4–1

=== Finals ===
HC Lugano vs. SC Bern
| Away | Home | |
|---|---|---|
| SC Bern 3 | 1 HC Lugano | |
| HC Lugano 1 | 2 SC Bern | |
| SC Bern 1 | 5 HC Lugano | |
| HC Lugano 4 | 3 SC Bern | |
| SC Bern 4 | 3 HC Lugano | OT |
SC Bern wins series 3–2

=== Scoring leaders ===
Note: GP = Games played; G = Goals; A = Assists; Pts = Points; PIM = Penalty Minutes

| Player | Team | GP | G | A | Pts | PIM |
|---|---|---|---|---|---|---|
| Petteri Nummelin | HC Lugano | 16 | 7 | 20 | 27 | 4 |
| Christian Dubé | SC Bern | 15 | 3 | 16 | 19 | 8 |
| Mike Maneluk | HC Lugano | 13 | 10 | 6 | 16 | 70 |
| Ivo Rüthemann | SC Bern | 15 | 5 | 10 | 15 | 4 |
| Sébastien Bordeleau | SC Bern | 14 | 10 | 4 | 14 | 14 |
| Ville Peltonen | HC Lugano | 16 | 4 | 10 | 14 | 8 |
| Yves Sarault | SC Bern | 15 | 6 | 7 | 13 | 36 |
| Adrian Wichser | HC Lugano | 16 | 6 | 7 | 13 | 2 |
| Flavien Conne | HC Lugano | 16 | 8 | 4 | 12 | 12 |
| Ryan Gardner | HC Lugano | 16 | 5 | 7 | 12 | 12 |

== Playout round ==
Teams ranked from 9 - 13 after regular season, played 2 games against each other.

=== Final standings ===
| | Team | GP | W | L | T | GF | GA | Pts |
|---|---|---|---|---|---|---|---|---|
| 9. | Kloten Flyers | 56 | 25 | 28 | 3 | 187 | 164 | 53 |
| 10. | SC Rapperswil-Jona | 56 | 20 | 31 | 5 | 158 | 182 | 45 |
| 11. | SCL Tigers | 56 | 19 | 31 | 6 | 153 | 204 | 44 |
| 12. | HC Lausanne | 56 | 17 | 36 | 3 | 132 | 195 | 37 |
| 13. | EHC Basel | 56 | 14 | 37 | 5 | 138 | 232 | 33 |

EHC Basel is relegated to Nationalliga B.

== League qualification ==
EHC Biel vs. HC Lausanne
| Away | Home | |
|---|---|---|
| HC Lausanne 3 | 2 EHC Biel | OT |
| EHC Biel 1 | 5 HC Lausanne | |
| HC Lausanne 4 | 3 EHC Biel | |
| EHC Biel 1 | 5 HC Lausanne | |
HC Lausanne wins series 4–0

HC Lausanne stays in Nationalliga A.

== Results from Puck.ch ==
- LNA Regular Season 2003-2004
- Playoff 2003-2004
- Playout 2003-2004
- LNA/LNB promotion/relegation
