= Andy Roach =

American ice hockey player

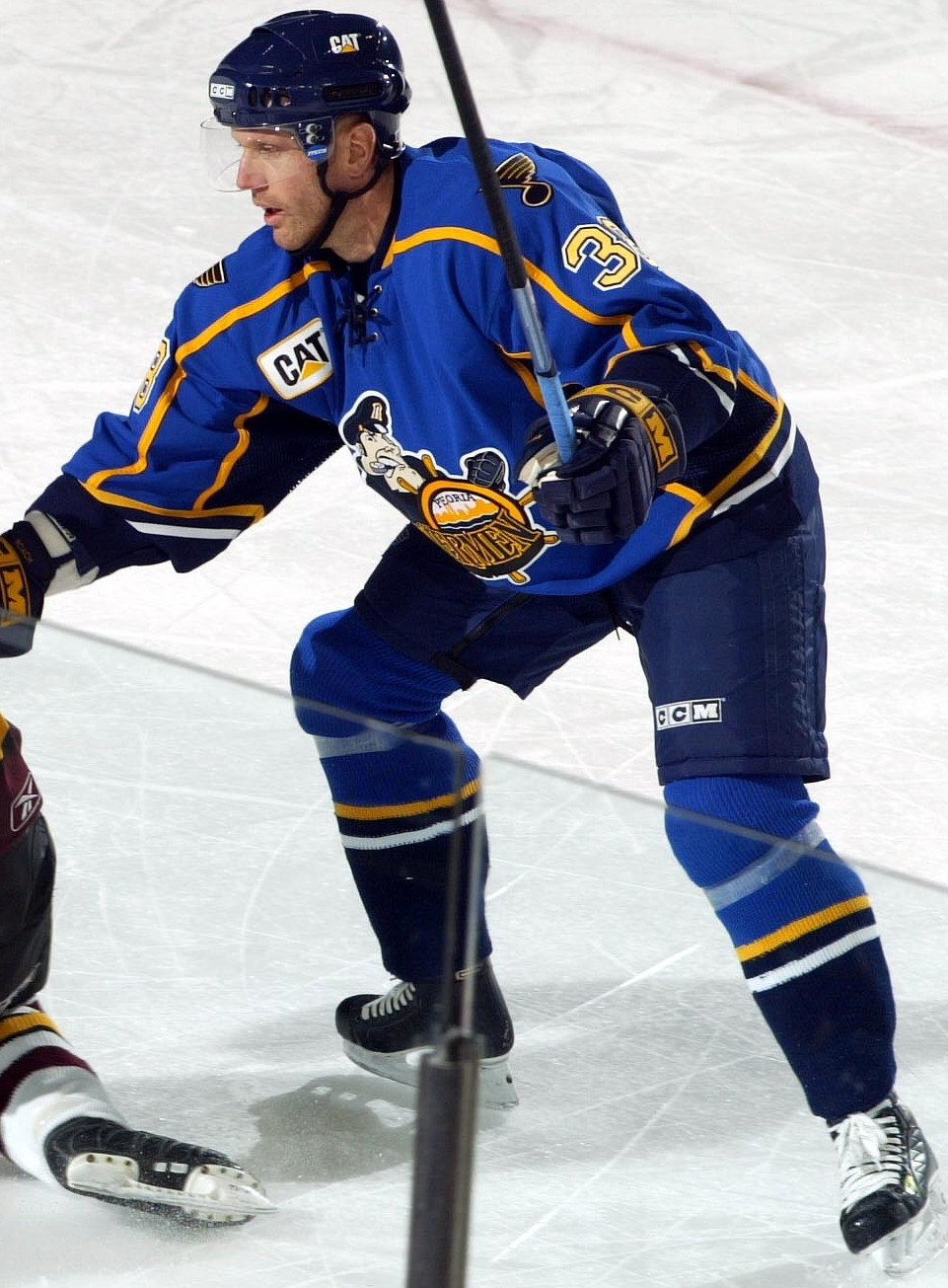
- Roach with the Peoria Rivermen in 2005
- Born: August 22, 1973 (age 52) Mattawan, Michigan, USA
- Height: 5 ft 11 in (180 cm)
- Weight: 181 lb (82 kg; 12 st 13 lb)
- Position: Defense
- Shot: Right
- Played for: Krefeld Pinguine; Adler Mannheim; HC Lausanne; St. Louis Blues; ZSC Lions; Eisbären Berlin; DEG Metro Stars
- National team: United States
- NHL draft: Undrafted
- Playing career: 1997–2012

Andrew Roach (born August 23, 1973) is an American former professional ice hockey defenseman. He played 5 games in the National Hockey League with the St. Louis Blues during the 2005–06 season. The rest of his career, which lasted from 1997 to 2012, was mainly spent in the Deutsche Eishockey Liga. Internationally Roach played for the American national team at the 2004 and 2005 World Championships, winning a bronze in the former tournament.

== Playing career ==
A stand out at Ferris State University, Roach has played for several teams after his college career including stints in the IHL, NLA, AHL, and currently plays in the DEL. Roach made his NHL debut with the St. Louis Blues in the 2005–06 season, registering 6 penalty minutes against the Detroit Red Wings in their home opener at Joe Louis Arena.

Roach played in just 5 games with the Blues before he was reassigned to AHL affiliate, the Peoria Rivermen, and subsequently returned to Europe with the ZSC Lions. The following season, Roach returned to the DEL and signed with Eisbären Berlin.

After four seasons with Eisbären Berlin, Roach then signed a one-year contract with rival DEL team, DEG Metro Stars on August 18, 2010.

== Career statistics ==
=== Regular season and playoffs ===
			Regular season					Playoffs
Season	Team	League	GP	G	A	Pts	PIM	GP	G	A	Pts	PIM
1991–92	Waterloo Black Hawks	USHL	45	12	16	28	6	—	—	—	—	—
1992–93	Waterloo Black Hawks	USHL	42	13	17	30	22	—	—	—	—	—
1993–94	Ferris State University	CCHA	32	4	15	19	18	—	—	—	—	—
1994–95	Ferris State University	CCHA	36	11	19	30	26	—	—	—	—	—
1995–96	Ferris State University	CCHA	33	15	19	34	44	—	—	—	—	—
1996–97	Ferris State University	CCHA	37	12	34	46	18	—	—	—	—	—
1997–98	San Antonio Dragons	IHL	67	8	16	24	30	—	—	—	—	—
1998–99	Long Beach Ice Dogs	IHL	41	5	21	26	34	—	—	—	—	—
1998–99	Utah Grizzlies	IHL	44	7	10	17	18	—	—	—	—	—
1999–00	Krefeld Pinguine	DEL	55	19	22	41	40	4	0	0	0	2
2000–01	Adler Mannheim	DEL	59	7	13	20	32	12	2	2	4	6
2001–02	Adler Mannheim	DEL	60	9	21	30	16	12	1	5	6	8
2002–03	Adler Mannheim	DEL	49	18	16	34	16	8	4	5	9	4
2003–04	Adler Mannheim	DEL	46	11	21	32	26	6	2	0	2	6
2004–05	HC Lausanne	NLA	14	4	5	9	20	—	—	—	—	—
2005–06	St. Louis Blues	NHL	5	1	2	3	10	—	—	—	—	—
2005–06	Peoria Rivermen	AHL	10	2	3	5	6	—	—	—	—	—
2005–06	ZSC Lions	NLA	14	4	7	11	16	—	—	—	—	—
2006–07	Eisbären Berlin	DEL	48	13	28	41	74	3	0	0	0	0
2007–08	Eisbären Berlin	DEL	56	16	31	47	54	14	1	6	7	18
2008–09	Eisbären Berlin	DEL	52	13	21	34	48	12	5	8	13	4
2009–10	Eisbären Berlin	DEL	55	12	21	33	46	5	1	2	3	2
2010–11	DEG Metro Stars	DEL	52	10	29	39	26	9	2	1	3	4
2011–12	DEG Metro Stars	DEL	52	8	29	37	43	7	1	2	3	4
DEL totals			584	136	252	388	421	92	19	31	50	58
NHL totals			5	1	2	3	10	—	—	—	—	—

=== International ===
Medal record

Representing United States

Ice hockey

World Championships
Bronze medal – third place	2004 Prague	

Year	Team	Event	GP	G	A	Pts	PIM
2004	United States	WC	9	2	3	5	0
2005	United States	WC	7	0	3	3	4
Senior totals			16	2	6	8	4

== Awards and honors ==
Award	Year
All-CCHA Rookie Team	1993–94
All-CCHA Second Team	1994–95
All-CCHA First Team	1995–96
AHCA West Second-Team All-American	1995–96
All-CCHA First Team	1996–97
AHCA West Second-Team All-American	1996–97

Awards and achievements
Preceded by Keith Aldridge	CCHA Best Offensive Defenseman; 1996–97	Succeeded by Dan Boyle
