= Antti-Jussi Niemi =

Finnish ice hockey player (born 1977)

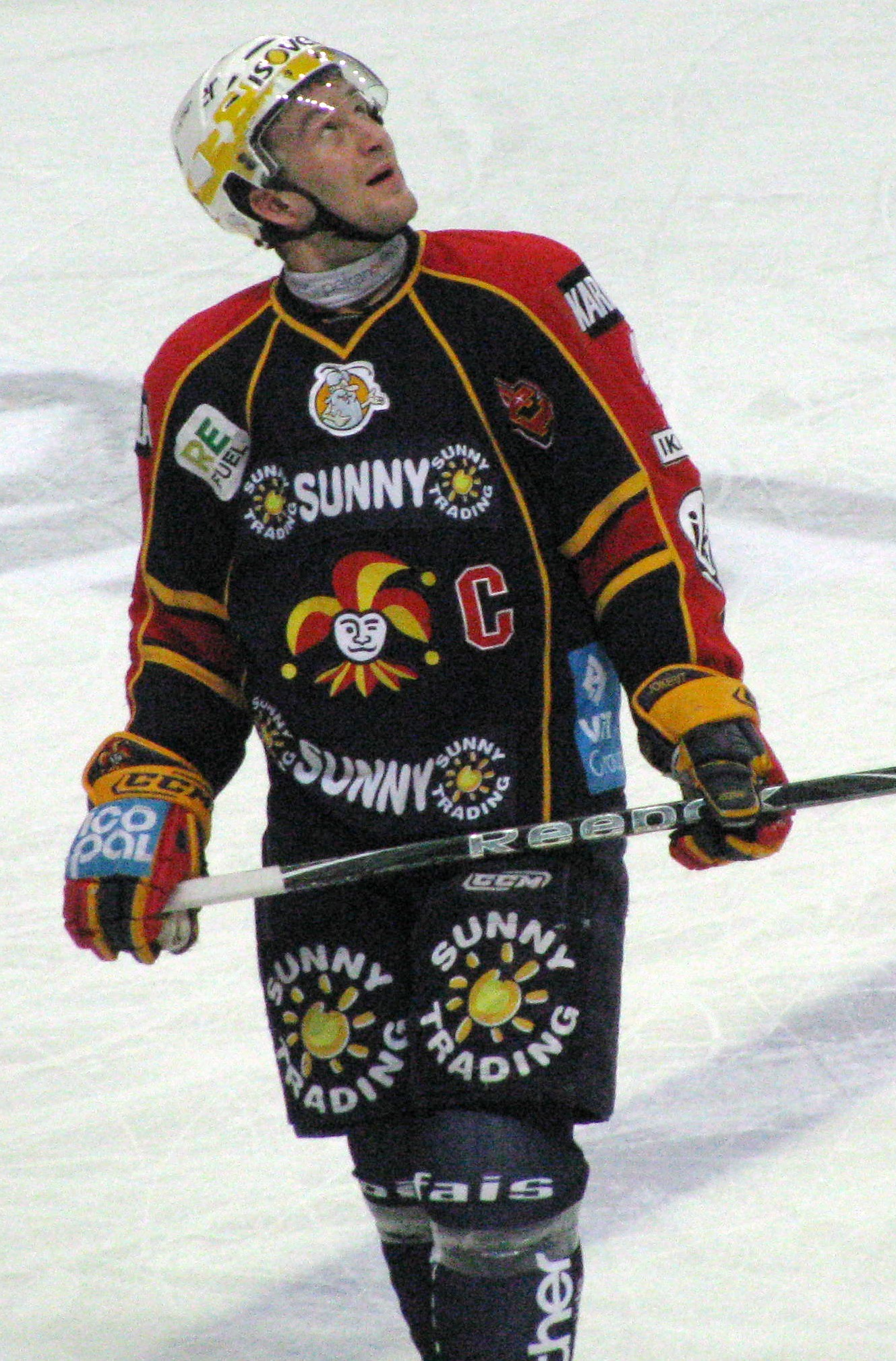
- Born: 22 September 1977 (age 48) Vantaa, Finland
- Height: 6 ft 1 in (185 cm)
- Weight: 195 lb (88 kg; 13 st 13 lb)
- Position: Defence
- Shot: Left
- Played for: Jokerit; Mighty Ducks of Anaheim; Frölunda HC; HC Lada Togliatti
- National team: Finland
- NHL draft: 81st overall, 1996; Ottawa Senators
- Playing career: 1996–2014

Antti-Jussi Jormanpoika Niemi (born 22 September 1977) is a Finnish former professional ice hockey player. Niemi played for Jokerit of the SM-liiga, the Mighty Ducks of Anaheim in the National Hockey League, HC Lada Togliatti in the Kontinental Hockey League, and Västra Frölunda HC and Leksands IF of the Swedish Elitserien.

== Professional career ==
Niemi began his professional career with Jokerit of the SM-liiga. His play attracted the attention of the Ottawa Senators of the National Hockey League, who drafted him in the fourth round of the 1996 NHL Entry Draft, 81st overall. In June 1999, the Senators traded his NHL rights to the Mighty Ducks of Anaheim, along with Ted Donato for Patrick Lalime.

Niemi moved to North America in 2000 to continue his professional career. Niemi played two years in the Mighty Ducks organization, mostly with their minor league Cincinnati Mighty Ducks team, but was called up to Anaheim for a total of 29 games.

Niemi returned to Finland and returned to Jokerit for the 2002–03 season. After one season, Niemi transferred to Frölunda HC of Sweden, where he played five seasons, including the 2005 Elitserien championship. The 2008–09 season was split between HC Lada Togliatti of the Kontinental Hockey League and Leksands IF of the Swedish league.

In 2009, Niemi returned to Finland and Jokerit. He played five more seasons with Jokerit to finish his career, retiring in 2014. In total, Niemi won two SM-liiga gold medals with Jokerit.

Niemi was a member of the Finnish national team at several World Championships, as well as the 2006 Winter Olympics. He was a member of the 2006 silver medal team.

== Career statistics ==
=== Regular season and playoffs ===
			Regular season					Playoffs
Season	Team	League	GP	G	A	Pts	PIM	GP	G	A	Pts	PIM
1993–94	Jokerit	FIN Jr	33	0	3	3	26	—	—	—	—	—
1994–95	Jokerit	FIN Jr	14	4	3	7	60	—	—	—	—	—
1995–96	Jokerit	FIN Jr	34	11	18	29	56	8	0	4	4	39
1995–96	Jokerit	Liiga	6	0	2	2	6	1	0	0	0	0
1995–96	Tuuski	FIN III	4	0	2	2	8	—	—	—	—	—
1996–97	Jokerit	FIN Jr	2	0	1	1	2	2	0	1	1	2
1996–97	Jokerit	Liiga	44	2	9	11	38	9	0	2	2	2
1997–98	Jokerit	FIN Jr	3	1	1	2	2	2	1	2	3	0
1997–98	Jokerit	Liiga	46	2	6	8	71	8	0	1	1	0
1998–99	Jokerit	Liiga	53	3	7	10	107	3	0	0	0	2
1999–2000	Jokerit	Liiga	53	8	8	16	79	11	0	3	3	6
2000–01	Cincinnati Mighty Ducks	AHL	36	3	8	11	26	—	—	—	—	—
2000–01	Mighty Ducks of Anaheim	NHL	28	1	1	2	22	—	—	—	—	—
2001–02	Cincinnati Mighty Ducks	AHL	39	10	9	19	25	3	1	1	2	2
2001–02	Mighty Ducks of Anaheim	NHL	1	0	0	0	0	—	—	—	—	—
2002–03	Jokerit	Liiga	48	6	11	17	42	1	0	0	0	0
2003–04	Västra Frölunda HC	SEL	47	4	14	18	74	10	4	1	5	20
2004–05	Frölunda HC	SEL	45	4	9	13	78	14	0	0	0	41
2005–06	Frölunda HC	SEL	49	1	4	5	60	17	0	1	1	10
2006–07	Frölunda HC	SEL	48	3	11	14	110	—	—	—	—	—
2007–08	Frölunda HC	SEL	54	1	4	5	79	7	1	1	2	35
2008–09	Lada Togliatti	KHL	27	0	2	2	30	—	—	—	—	—
2008–09	Leksands IF	SWE II	8	0	0	0	22	—	—	—	—	—
2009–10	Jokerit	Liiga	51	1	8	9	74	3	0	0	0	14
2010–11	Jokerit	Liiga	38	1	2	3	78	7	0	1	1	12
2011–12	Jokerit	Liiga	43	1	7	8	52	2	0	0	0	2
2012–13	Jokerit	Liiga	39	2	7	9	36	6	0	0	0	29
2013–14	Jokerit	Liiga	32	2	4	6	31	—	—	—	—	—
Liiga totals			453	28	71	99	612	51	0	7	7	67
NHL totals			29	1	1	2	22	—	—	—	—	—
SEL totals			243	13	42	55	401	48	5	3	8	106

=== International ===
Olympic medal record

Men's ice hockey
Silver medal – second place	2006 Turin	Ice hockey

Year	Team	Event	GP	G	A	Pts	PIM
1995	Finland	EJC	5	0	1	1	7
1996	Finland	WJC	6	3	1	4	43
1997	Finland	WJC	6	0	2	2	8
1998	Finland	WC	9	0	0	0	6
1999	Finland	WC	12	1	1	2	8
2000	Finland	WC	9	0	0	0	0
2001	Finland	WC	9	0	1	1	10
2004	Finland	WC	7	1	2	3	4
2005	Finland	WC	7	2	0	2	4
2006	Finland	OG	8	0	0	0	2
2008	Finland	WC	9	0	1	1	28
Junior totals			17	3	4	7	58
Senior totals			70	4	5	9	62
