= Alexander Skugarev =

Russian ice hockey player

- Born: 13 March 1975 (age 51) Angarsk, Soviet Union
- Height: 6 ft 2 in (188 cm)
- Weight: 212 lb (96 kg; 15 st 2 lb)
- Position: Center
- Shot: Left
- Played for: Yermak Angarsk; Amur Khabarovsk; Lokomotiv Yaroslavl; Lada Togliatti; Dynamo Moscow; CSKA Moscow; Barys Astana; Krylia Sovetov Moscow
- National team: Russia
- NHL draft: Undrafted
- Playing career: 1995–2012

Alexander Petrovich Skugarev (Russian: Александр Петрович Скугарев; born 13 March 1975) is a retired Russian professional ice hockey center.

== Career statistics ==
			Regular season					Playoffs
Season	Team	League	GP	G	A	Pts	PIM	GP	G	A	Pts	PIM
1991–92	Yermak Angarsk	Soviet3	7	0	0	0	0	—	—	—	—	—
1992–93	Yermak Angarsk	Russia2	35	6	3	9	8	—	—	—	—	—
1993–94	Yermak Angarsk	Russia3	12	13	9	22	0	—	—	—	—	—
1994–95	Yermak Angarsk	Russia2	24	14	12	26	2	—	—	—	—	—
1995–96	Yermak Angarsk	Russia2	50	24	17	41	18	—	—	—	—	—
1995–96	SKA Khabarovsk	Russia2	9	1	0	1	0	—	—	—	—	—
1996–97	SKA-Amur Khabarovsk	Russia	23	5	8	13	14	—	—	—	—	—
1996–97	SKA-Amur Khabarovsk	WCHL	11	3	5	8	6	—	—	—	—	—
1997–98	SKA-Amur Khabarovsk	Russia	45	8	6	14	51	—	—	—	—	—
1998–99	SKA-Amur Khabarovsk	Russia	41	4	6	10	42	3	0	2	2	0
1999–00	Amur Khabarovsk	Russia	37	12	7	19	28	5	1	1	2	6
2000–01	Lokomotiv Yaroslavl	Russia	42	10	13	23	46	11	1	1	2	18
2001–02	Lokomotiv Yaroslavl	Russia	38	3	8	11	16	4	0	0	0	2
2002–03	Lokomotiv Yaroslavl	Russia	27	5	6	11	22	—	—	—	—	—
2003–04	Lada Togliatti	Russia	58	21	13	34	18	6	1	0	1	2
2004–05	Lada Togliatti	Russia	48	11	8	19	38	10	2	0	2	4
2005–06	HC Dynamo Moscow	Russia	25	1	7	8	43	4	0	2	2	6
2006–07	HC Dynamo Moscow	Russia	54	10	22	32	42	3	0	0	0	0
2007–08	HC CSKA Moscow	Russia	51	10	20	30	40	6	1	2	3	2
2008–09	HC CSKA Moscow	KHL	19	1	4	5	16	—	—	—	—	—
2008–09	Barys Astana	KHL	21	3	6	9	8	2	0	0	0	0
2010–11	Yermak Angarsk	VHL	31	4	13	17	52	—	—	—	—	—
2010–11	Krylya Sovetov Moscow	VHL	9	4	3	7	2	5	1	1	2	6
2011–12	Buran Voronezh	Russia3	52	16	38	54	84	9	2	3	5	6
Russia totals			489	100	124	224	400	88	22	18	40	95
KHL totals			40	4	10	14	18	2	0	0	0	0
