= Ján Lašák =

Slovak ice hockey player (born 1979)

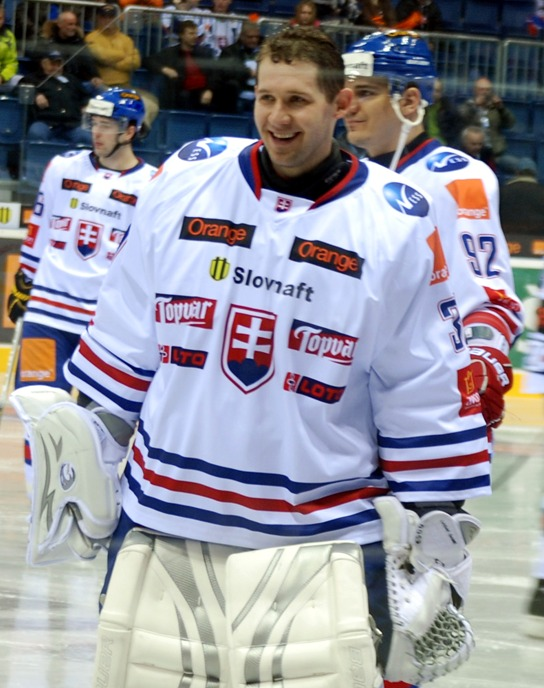
- Lašák in 2011
- Born: April 10, 1979 (age 47) Zvolen, Czechoslovakia
- Height: 6 ft 1 in (185 cm)
- Weight: 203 lb (92 kg; 14 st 7 lb)
- Position: Goaltender
- Caught: Left
- Played for: Nashville Predators; SKA St. Petersburg; HC Pardubice; HC Košice; Atlant Moscow Oblast; Jokerit
- National team: Slovakia
- NHL draft: 65th overall, 1999; Nashville Predators
- Playing career: 1999–2017

Ján Lašák (born April 10, 1979) is a Slovak former professional ice hockey goaltender.

Lašák was drafted by the Nashville Predators of the National Hockey League (NHL) in the 2nd round (65th overall) of the 1999 NHL entry draft and spent the following four seasons in North America before returning to Europe in 2003.

== Playing career ==
After Lašák was drafted by the Predators, he moved to North America and spent his first professional season with the Hampton Roads Admirals of the East Coast Hockey League (ECHL). He had a stellar debut, posting a 36-17-4 record, and was named ECHL Rookie of the Year and Goaltender of the Year, as well as to the All-Rookie and First All-Star teams. He spent the majority of the following three seasons with Nashville's top minor league affiliate, the Milwaukee Admirals of the International Hockey League. He posted a 53-49-12 record with Milwaukee, earning some limited action with the Predators. However, he was unable to earn a permanent spot with the Predators, appearing in only 6 games for the team, and posting an 0–4 record.

Due to his inability to stick with the Predators, Lašák decided to return to Europe and spent the 2003–04 season with SKA St. Petersburg of the Russian Super League. The following year Lašák moved to the Czech Republic to play with HC Pardubice of the Czech Extraliga, the team with which he would spend the next five seasons. He enjoyed much success with Pardubice, posting a 116-85-5 record and leading them to the league championship in 2004–05.

Following his successful stint in the Czech Extraliga, Lašák spent the 2009-10 season with Atlant Mytishchi of the Kontinental Hockey League. He posted an 11-6-4 record as the team bowed out in the first round of the playoffs. He also spent part of the season on loan to HC Košice of the Slovak Extraliga, appearing in 17 games for the club.

Lašák signed a one-year contract with Jokerit of the Finnish SM-liiga for the 2010–11 season. He posted a 14–11 record along with a .923 save percentage during the regular season, and despite his efforts including a .940 save percentage and 1.94 goals against average, Jokerit lost its quarterfinal series to HIFK.

In 2011 Lašák returned to the KHL and signed for Amur Khabarovsk.

Ján Lašák
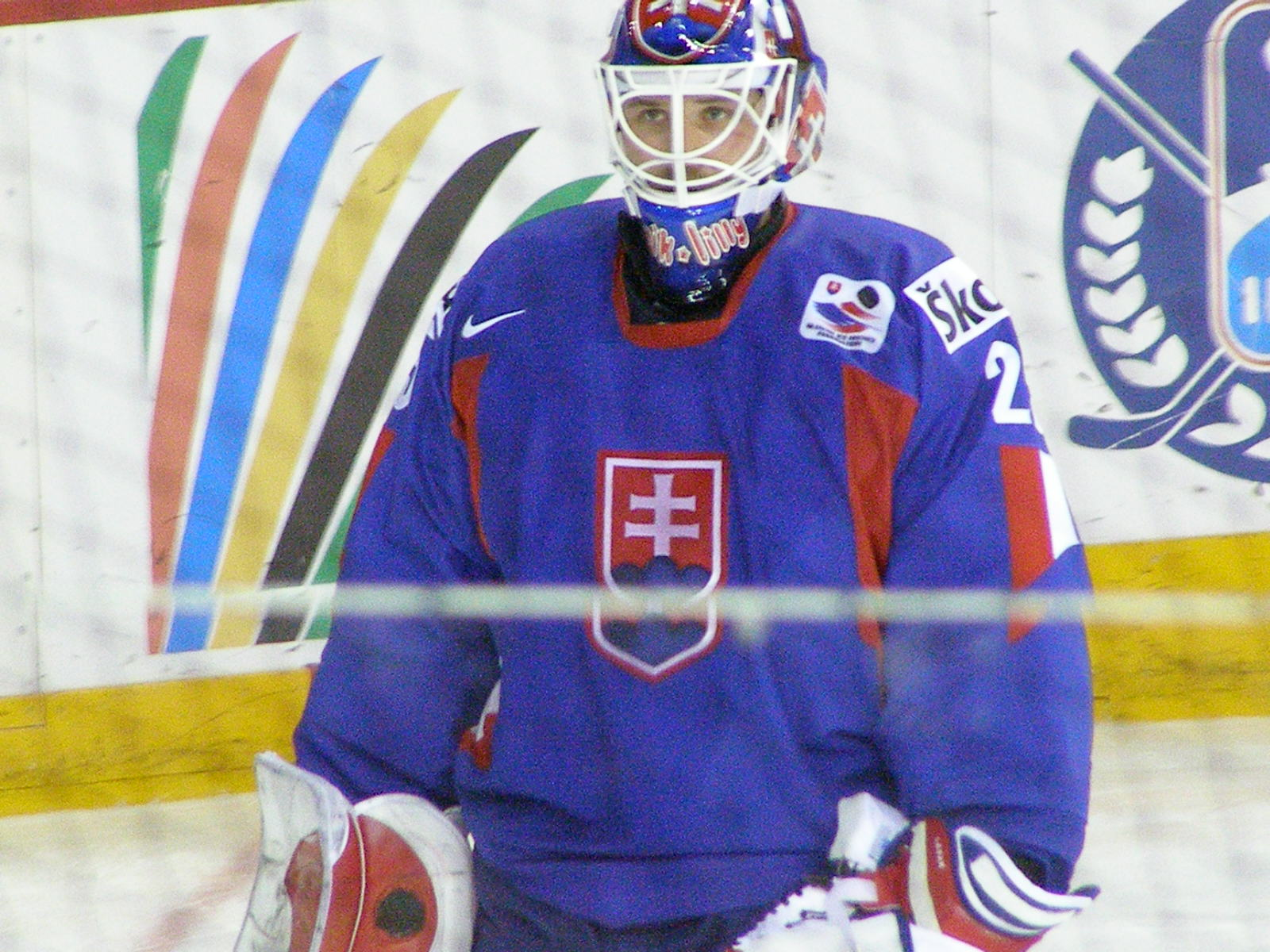
- Lasak at the 2008 IIHF World Championship

Medal record

Representing Slovakia

Ice hockey

IIHF World Championships
Gold medal – first place	2002 Sweden	
Silver medal – second place	2000 Russia	
Bronze medal – third place	2003 Finland	

World Junior Championships
Bronze medal – third place	1999 Canada	

== International play ==
Lašák has been a longtime mainstay of the Slovak national team. He has appeared in nine IIHF World Championships, two Winter Olympic Games, and one World Cup of Hockey for Slovakia. He backstopped Slovakia to its first and to date only gold medal at the 2002 IIHF World Championship in Sweden, while also helping his country capture silver at the 2000 IIHF World Championship and bronze at the 2003 IIHF World Championship.

== Personal life ==
From 2002 to 2015, Lašák was married to a volleyball player. They had two children. In 2024, Lašák married designer Romana Lašáková, with whom he has another two children.

== Career statistics ==
			Regular season									Playoffs
Season	Team	League	GP	W	L	T/OT	MIN	GA	SO	GAA	SV%	GP	W	L	MIN	GA	SO	GAA	SV%
1998–99	Zvolen	SVK	8	—	—	—	387	29	0	4.50	—	—	—	—	—	—	—	—	—
1999-00	Hampton Roads Admirals	ECHL	59	36	17	4	3409	145	0	2.55	.917	10	5	5	610	28	1	2.75	.918
2000–01	Milwaukee Admirals	IHL	43	23	17	2	2439	106	1	2.61	.913	3	0	1	60	5	0	4.97	.844
2001-02	Milwaukee Admirals	AHL	34	12	18	3	1981	79	2	2.39	.916	—	—	—	—	—	—	—	—
2001-02	Nashville Predators	NHL	3	0	3	0	177	13	0	4.41	.875	—	—	—	—	—	—	—	—
2002–03	Milwaukee Admirals	AHL	40	18	14	7	2378	113	1	2.85	.901	6	2	4	366	19	0	3.12	.878
2002–03	Nashville Predators	NHL	3	0	1	0	90	5	0	3.33	.872	—	—	—	—	—	—	—	—
2003–04	SKA St. Petersburg	RSL	34	—	—	—	2000	80	0	2.40	.909	—	—	—	—	—	—	—	—
2004–05	HC Pardubice	CZE	46	31	14	1	2769	108	4	2.34	.930	16	—	—	977	29	3	1.78	.950
2005–06	HC Pardubice	CZE	33	16	13	4	1936	82	3	2.54	.927	—	—	—	—	—	—	—	—
2006–07	HC Pardubice	CZE	45	25	20	0	2625	113	6	2.58	.930	18	10	8	1067	39	3	2.19	.932
2007–08	HC Pardubice	CZE	45	22	23	0	2617	118	4	2.71	.925	—	—	—	—	—	—	—	—
2008–09	HC Pardubice	CZE	37	22	15	0	2165	99	1	2.74	.919	7	3	4	455	15	1	1.98	.931
2009-10	Atlant Mytishchi	KHL	21	11	6	4	1249	52	2	2.50	.908	4	1	2	238	10	0	2.52	.921
2009-10	HC Košice	SVK	17	—	—	—	977	47	1	2.89	.901	—	—	—	—	—	—	—	—
2010-11	Jokerit	SM-I	33	14	11	—	1987	72	2	2.17	.923	7	3	4	432	14	1	1.94	.940
NHL totals			6	0	4	0	267	18	0	4.04	.874	—	—	—	—	—	—	—	—
AHL totals			74	30	32	10	4359	192	3	2.64	.908	6	2	4	366	19	0	3.11	.878
CZE totals			212	116	85	5	12470	538	18	2.59	.924	41	—	—	2499	83	7	1.99	.939

== Awards and honors ==
Award	Year
Czech
Champion	2005, 2016
