= Maxim Sokolov =

Russian ice hockey player (born 1972)

- Born: 27 May 1972 (age 53) Leningrad, Russian SFSR, URS
- Height: 5 ft 11 in (180 cm)
- Weight: 172 lb (78 kg; 12 st 4 lb)
- Position: Goaltender
- Caught: Left
- KHL team Former teams: SKA Saint Petersburg; Metallurg Novokuznetsk; Avangard Omsk; HC Severstal
- National team: Russia
- Playing career: 1992–2013

Maxim Anatolievich Sokolov (born 27 May 1972 in Leningrad, Russian SFSR, Soviet Union) is a former professional ice hockey goalie who most recently played for Nizhnekamsk Neftekhimik of the Kontinental Hockey League (KHL).

== Personal life ==
Before the 2006 Olympic Games, Sokolov joined the United Russia party.
