= 2003 IIHF World Championship =

2003 edition of the IIHF World Championship

Tournament details
- Host country: Finland
- Venues: 3 (in 3 host cities)
- Dates: 26 April – 11 May
- Opened by: Tarja Halonen
- Teams: 16

Final positions
- Champions: Canada (22nd title)
- Runners-up: Sweden
- Third place: Slovakia
- Fourth place: Czech Republic

Tournament statistics
- Games played: 56
- Goals scored: 349 (6.23 per game)
- Attendance: 449,193 (8,021 per game)
- Scoring leader: (Slovakia) Žigmund Pálffy (15 points)

The 2003 IIHF World Championship was held between 26 April and 11 May 2003 in Helsinki, Tampere and Turku, Finland.

It was the 67th annual event, and was run by the International Ice Hockey Federation (IIHF).

Canada won the gold medal after defeating Sweden 3–2 in a tightly fought final. Over 14 minutes into the overtime, Canadian forward Anson Carter beat Swedish goaltender Mikael Tellqvist with a wraparound goal. The goal was contested for several minutes before replays confirmed that Tellqvist had stopped the puck behind the goal line. It was Canada's first World Championship win in five years.

Sweden surrendered five consecutive goals against Finland in their quarterfinal to trail 5–1 seven minutes into the second period, at which point Swedish goaltender Tommy Salo was swapped for Mikael Tellqvist. This proved to be the Swedish team's necessary wake-up call as the Swedes went on to score five unanswered goals before the end of regulation and ultimately win the game 6–5.

To celebrate the games, the Finnish government issued a high value commemorative coin: the 2003 Ice Hockey World Championships commemorative coin, with three ice hockey sticks and a puck engraved on the reverse.

== Qualification Tournament ==
The Far Eastern Qualification was played as a single game during the 2003 Asian Winter Games on February 4, 2003, in Hachinohe, Japan. South Korea had opted to not play as they believed it more beneficial to focus on training and developing for their Division II tournament. During the games Japan also beat the Koreans eleven to two in the semi-finals.

Team	Pld	W	D	L	GF	GA	GD	Pts
Japan	1	1	0	0	15	0	+15	2
China	1	0	0	1	0	15	−15	0

Source: IIHF

All times local

February 4, 2003; 19:00	Japan	15–0	China

== Venues ==
2003 IIHF World Championship is located in Finland	Hartwall Areena Capacity: 13,349	Elysée Arena Capacity: 11,820	Tampere Ice Hall Capacity: 7,800
2003 IIHF World Championship is located in Finland	Finland – Helsinki	Finland – Turku	Finland – Tampere

== Final tournament ==
=== First round ===
In the first round, the top three teams from each group progressed to the second round, whilst the last-placed team progressed to the consolation round.

==== Group A ====
Team	Pld	W	D	L	GF	GA	GD	Pts
Slovakia	3	3	0	0	22	5	+17	6
Germany	3	2	0	1	9	8	+1	4
Ukraine	3	1	0	2	9	13	−4	2
Japan	3	0	0	3	6	20	−14	0

Source: IIHF

All times local

27 April 2003; 16:00	Germany	5–4	Japan

27 April 2003; 20:00	Ukraine	3–9	Slovakia

28 April 2003; 16:00	Slovakia	10–1	Japan

29 April 2003; 16:00	Germany	3–1	Ukraine

30 April 2003; 16:00	Slovakia	3–1	Germany

30 April 2003; 20:00	Japan	1–5	Ukraine

==== Group B ====
Team	Pld	W	D	L	GF	GA	GD	Pts
Russia	3	3	0	0	14	5	+9	6
Switzerland	3	2	0	1	9	7	+2	4
Denmark	3	1	0	2	8	14	−6	2
United States	3	0	0	3	4	9	−5	0

Source: IIHF

26 April 2003; 15:00	United States	2–5	Denmark

26 April 2003; 19:00	Switzerland	2–5	Russia

27 April 2003; 15:00	United States	0–1	Switzerland

27 April 2003; 19:00	Russia	6–1	Denmark

29 April 2003; 15:00	Denmark	2–6	Switzerland

29 April 2003; 19:00	Russia	3–2	United States

==== Group C ====
Team	Pld	W	D	L	GF	GA	GD	Pts
Canada	3	3	0	0	12	2	+10	6
Sweden	3	2	0	1	6	5	+1	4
Latvia	3	1	0	2	6	9	−3	2
Belarus	3	0	0	3	1	9	−8	0

Source: IIHF

26 April 2003; 16:00	Canada	3–0	Belarus

26 April 2003; 20:00	Latvia	1–3	Sweden

27 April 2003; 16:00	Canada	6–1	Latvia

27 April 2003; 20:00	Sweden	2–1	Belarus

29 April 2003; 16:00	Belarus	0–4	Latvia

29 April 2003; 20:00	Sweden	1–3	Canada

==== Group D ====
Team	Pld	W	D	L	GF	GA	GD	Pts
Czech Republic	3	3	0	0	15	4	+11	6
Finland	3	2	0	1	18	3	+15	4
Austria	3	1	0	2	8	15	−7	2
Slovenia	3	0	0	3	4	23	−19	0

Source: IIHF

26 April 2003; 16:00	Czech Republic	5–2	Slovenia	Hartwall Areena, Helsinki

26 April 2003; 20:00	Austria	1–5	Finland	Hartwall Areena, Helsinki

28 April 2003; 19:00	Finland	12–0	Slovenia	Tampere Ice Hall, Tampere

28 April 2003; 20:00	Czech Republic	8–1	Austria	Hartwall Areena, Helsinki

29 April 2003; 20:00	Slovenia	2–6	Austria	Hartwall Areena, Helsinki

30 April 2003; 16:00	Finland	1–2	Czech Republic	Elysée Areena, Turku

=== Second round ===
In the second round, the top four teams from each group progressed to the final round, whilst the bottom two teams were eliminated.

==== Group E ====
Tables and scores below include meetings between teams during the first round.

Team	Pld	W	D	L	GF	GA	GD	Pts
Slovakia	5	4	1	0	27	9	+18	9
Czech Republic	5	4	1	0	22	7	+15	9
Finland	5	2	1	2	18	10	+8	5
Germany	5	2	1	2	11	11	0	5
Austria	5	1	0	4	9	27	−18	2
Ukraine	5	0	0	5	8	31	−23	0

Source: IIHF

26 April 2003; 20:00	Austria	1–5	Finland

27 April 2003; 20:00	Ukraine	3–9	Slovakia

28 April 2003; 20:00	Czech Republic	8–1	Austria

29 April 2003; 16:00	Germany	3–1	Ukraine

30 April 2003; 16:00	Slovakia	3–1	Germany

30 April 2003; 16:00	Finland	1–2	Czech Republic

2 May 2003; 16:00	Slovakia	5–1	Finland

2 May 2003; 20:00	Czech Republic	5–2	Ukraine

3 May 2003; 16:00	Germany	5–1	Austria

3 May 2003; 20:00	Finland	9–0	Ukraine

4 May 2003; 16:00	Slovakia	7–1	Austria

4 May 2003; 20:00	Czech Republic	4–0	Germany

5 May 2003; 20:00	Slovakia	3–3	Czech Republic

6 May 2003; 16:00	Ukraine	2–5	Austria

6 May 2003; 20:00	Finland	2–2	Germany

==== Group F ====
Tables and scores below include meetings between teams during the first round.

Team	Pld	W	D	L	GF	GA	GD	Pts
Canada	5	4	1	0	18	6	+12	9
Sweden	5	4	0	1	20	9	+11	8
Russia	5	2	0	3	16	14	+2	4
Switzerland	5	2	0	3	14	16	−2	4
Latvia	5	2	0	3	10	16	−6	4
Denmark	5	0	1	4	8	25	−17	1

Source: IIHF

26 April 2003; 19:00	Switzerland	2–5	Russia

26 April 2003; 20:00	Latvia	1–3	Sweden

27 April 2003; 16:00	Canada	6–1	Latvia

27 April 2003; 19:00	Russia	6–1	Denmark

29 April 2003; 15:00	Denmark	2–6	Switzerland

29 April 2003; 20:00	Sweden	1–3	Canada

2 May 2003; 16:00	Canada	2–2	Denmark

2 May 2003; 20:05	Russia	2–4	Sweden

3 May 2003; 16:00	Switzerland	4–2	Latvia

3 May 2003; 20:05	Sweden	7–1	Denmark

4 May 2003; 16:00	Latvia	2–1	Russia

4 May 2003; 20:00	Canada	2–0	Switzerland

5 May 2003; 20:00	Russia	2–5	Canada

6 May 2003; 16:00	Denmark	2–4	Latvia

6 May 2003; 20:00	Switzerland	2–5	Sweden

=== Consolation round 13–16 place ===
==== Group G ====
Team	Pld	W	D	L	GF	GA	GD	Pts
United States	3	3	0	0	19	5	+14	6
Belarus	3	2	0	1	9	8	+1	4
Slovenia	3	0	1	2	8	14	−6	1
Japan	3	0	1	2	5	14	−9	1

Source: IIHF

As the Far Eastern qualifier, Japan avoided relegation. Therefore, Belarus and Slovenia were relegated to Division I for the 2004 Championships.

2 May 2003; 15:00	United States	7–2	Slovenia

2 May 2003; 19:00	Belarus	3–1	Japan

3 May 2003; 15:00	Japan	3–3	Slovenia

3 May 2003; 19:00	United States	4–2	Belarus

5 May 2003; 15:00	Slovenia	3–4	Belarus

5 May 2003; 19:00	Japan	1–8	United States

=== Final round ===
Quarter-finals
7 May
Canada	3
Germany	2
7 May
Czech Republic	3
Russia	0
7 May
Slovakia	3
Switzerland	1
7 May
Sweden	6
Finland	5

Semi-finals
9 May
Canada	8
Czech Republic	4
9 May
Slovakia	1
Sweden	4

Final
11 May
Canada	3
Sweden	2
Third place
10 May
Czech Republic	2
Slovakia	4

==== Quarterfinals ====
7 May	Canada	3–2 (OT)	Germany

7 May	Slovakia	3–1	Switzerland

7 May	Czech Republic	3–0	Russia

7 May	Sweden	6–5	Finland

Mats Sundin – 04:45	1-0
	1-1	07:31 – Teemu Selänne
	1-2	09:13 – Teemu Selänne
	1-3	18:35 – Tomi Kallio
	1-4	25:26 – Kimmo Rintanen
	1-5	26:44 – Teemu Selänne
Jörgen Jönsson – 28:04	2-5
Peter Forsberg – 29:27	3-5
Jonas Höglund – 37:20	4-5
Peter Forsberg – 48:22	5-5
Per-Johan Axelsson – 55:06	6-5

==== Semifinals ====
9 May	Canada	8–4	Czech Republic

9 May	Slovakia	1–4	Sweden

==== Match for third place ====
10 May	Czech Republic	2–4	Slovakia

==== Final ====
11 May	Canada	3–2 (OT) (1-2, 0-0, 1-0, 1-0)	Sweden	Helsinki; Attendance: 13,387

Roberto Luongo
Goalies
Mikael Tellqvist
Referee:
(Czech Republic) Vladimir Šindler
Linesmen:
(Czech Republic) Petr Blümel
(Finland) Antti Hämäläinen

	0-1	10:18 − Mathias Tjärnqvist
	0-2	18:39 − Per-Johan Axelsson
Shawn Horcoff − 19:17	1-2
Shane Doan − 49:03	2-2
Anson Carter − 73:49	3-2

== Ranking and statistics ==
2003 IIHF World Championship winners

Canada
22nd title

=== Tournament awards ===
- Best players selected by the directorate:
  - Best Goaltender: (Canada) Sean Burke
  - Best Defenceman: (Canada) Jay Bouwmeester
  - Best Forward: (Sweden) Mats Sundin
  - Most Valuable Player: (Sweden) Mats Sundin
- Media All-Star Team:
  - Goaltender: (Canada) Sean Burke
  - Defence: (Canada) Jay Bouwmeester, (Slovakia) Ľubomír Višňovský
  - Forwards: (Sweden) Peter Forsberg, (Canada) Dany Heatley, (Sweden) Mats Sundin

=== Final standings ===
The final standings of the tournament according to IIHF:

1st place, gold medalist(s)	Canada
2nd place, silver medalist(s)	Sweden
3rd place, bronze medalist(s)	Slovakia
4	Czech Republic
5	Finland
6	Germany
7	Russia
8	Switzerland
9	Latvia
10	Austria
11	Denmark
12	Ukraine
13	United States
14	Belarus
15	Slovenia
16	Japan

=== Scoring leaders ===
List shows the top ten skaters sorted by points, then goals, then (fewer) games played.

Player	GP	G	A	Pts	+/−	PIM	POS
(Slovakia) Žigmund Pálffy	9	7	8	15	+9	18	F
(Slovakia) Jozef Stümpel	9	4	11	15	+7	0	F
(Slovakia) Ľubomír Višňovský	9	4	8	12	+11	2	D
(Finland) Teemu Selänne	7	8	3	11	+3	2	F
(Finland) Saku Koivu	7	1	10	11	+3	4	F
(Canada) Dany Heatley	9	7	3	10	+9	10	F
(Sweden) Mats Sundin	7	6	4	10	+8	10	F
(Slovakia) Miroslav Šatan	9	6	4	10	+2	2	F
(Czech Republic) Martin Straka	9	6	4	10	+5	4	F
(Finland) Kimmo Rintanen	7	5	4	9	+3	0	F

Source: IIHF.com

=== Leading goaltenders ===
Only the top five goaltenders, based on save percentage, who have played 40% of their team's minutes are included in this list.

Player	MIP	SOG	GA	GAA	SVS%	SO
(Germany) Oliver Jonas	180:00	100	4	1.33	96.00	0
(Canada) Sean Burke	328:47	156	7	1.28	95.51	1
(Sweden) Mikael Tellqvist	393:16	150	9	1.37	94.00	0
(Slovakia) Ján Lašák	359:20	168	11	1.84	93.45	0
(Switzerland) Marco Bührer	297:25	137	9	1.82	93.43	1

Source: IIHF.com

== IIHF honors and awards ==
The 2003 IIHF Hall of Fame induction ceremony has held in Helsinki during the World Championships. George Nagobads of the United States was given the Paul Loicq Award for outstanding contributions to international ice hockey.

IIHF Hall of Fame inductees

- Curt Berglund, Sweden
- Bengt-Åke Gustafsson, Sweden
- Heinz Henschel, Germany
- Timo Jutila, Finland
- Josef Kompalla, Germany
- Josef Maleček, Czech Republic
- Unto Wiitala, Finland
- Alexander Yakushev, Russia

== See also ==
- IIHF World Championship
