= 2001 IIHF World Championship rosters =

Rosters at the 2001 IIHF World Championship in Germany.

== Czech Republic ==
vlevo
Position	Player	club
Goalkeepers	Milan Hnilička	Atlanta Thrashers
	Dušan Salfický	Keramika Plzeň
	Vladimír Hudáček	Continental Zlín
Defenders	Jaroslav Špaček	Chicago Blackhawks
	Pavel Kubina	Tampa Bay Lightning
	Karel Pilař	Chemopetrol Litvínov
	Radek Martínek	HC České Budějovice
	Filip Kuba	Minnesota Wild
	František Kaberle	Atlanta Thrashers
	Martin Richter	SaiPa
Forwards	Radek Dvořák	New York Rangers
	Robert Reichel	Chemopetrol Litvínov – C
	Martin Ručinský	Montreal Canadiens
	David Výborný	Columbus Blue Jackets
	Jiří Dopita	Slovnaft Vsetín
	Jaroslav Hlinka	Sparta Praha
	David Moravec	HC Vítkovice
	Pavel Patera	Minnesota Wild
	Martin Procházka	HC Vítkovice
	Viktor Ujčík	Slavia Praha
	Petr Čajánek	Continental Zlín
	Tomáš Vlasák	HPK
	Jan Tomajko	Slovnaft Vsetín
Coaches	Josef Augusta	
	Vladimír Martinec	

Source: IIHF.

== Finland ==
vlevo
Position	Player	Club
Goalkeepers	Pasi Nurminen	Jokerit
	Miikka Kiprusoff	San Jose Sharks
	Jarmo Myllys	Luleå HF
Defenders	Marko Kiprusoff	EHC Kloten
	Petteri Nummelin	Columbus Blue Jackets
	Kimmo Timonen	Nashville Predators
	Sami Salo	Ottawa Senators
	Ossi Väänänen	Phoenix Coyotes
	Aki-Petteri Berg	Toronto Maple Leafs
	Antti-Jussi Niemi	Mighty Ducks of Anaheim
	Janne Grönvall	Tappara
Forwards	Raimo Helminen	Ilves
	Antti Laaksonen	Minnesota Wild
	Tomi Kallio	Atlanta Thrashers
	Niko Kapanen	TPS
	Sami Kapanen	Carolina Hurricanes
	Jukka Hentunen	Jokerit
	Timo Pärssinen	HPK
	Juha Lind	Montreal Canadiens
	Toni Sihvonen	HIFK
	Kimmo Rintanen	TPS
	Tony Virta	TPS
	Juha Ylönen	Phoenix Coyotes
	Jarkko Ruutu	Vancouver Canucks
Coaches	Hannu Aravirta	
	Jari Kaarela	

Source: IIHF.

== Sweden ==
vlevo
Position	Player	club
Goalkeepers	Andreas Hadelöv	Malmö Redhawks
	Mikael Tellqvist	Djurgårdens IF
	Tommy Salo	Edmonton Oilers
Defenders	Mattias Öhlund	Vancouver Canucks
	Kim Johnsson	New York Rangers
	Christer Olsson	Brynäs IF
	Leif Rohlin	HC Ambrì-Piotta
	Björn Nord	Nuremberg Ice Tigers
	Daniel Tjärnqvist	Djurgårdens IF
	Peter Andersson	HC Lugano
Forwards	Kristofer Ottosson	Djurgårdens IF
	Andreas Johansson	SC Bern
	Per-Johan Axelsson	Boston Bruins
	Daniel Sedin	Vancouver Canucks
	Henrik Sedin	Vancouver Canucks
	Mats Sundin	Toronto Maple Leafs
	Mathias Johansson	Färjestad BK
	Jimmie Ölvestad	Djurgårdens IF
	Mikael Renberg	Luleå HF
	Henrik Zetterberg	Timrå IK
	Jörgen Jönsson	Färjestad BK
	Kristian Huselius	Västra Frölunda HC
	Andreas Salomonsson	Djurgårdens IF
	Daniel Alfredsson	Ottawa Senators
	Fredrik Modin	Tampa Bay Lightning
Coaches	Hardy Nilsson	
	Tommy Tomth	

Source: IIHF.

== USA ==
Position	Player	Club
Goalkeepers	Rick DiPietro	New York Islanders
	Ryan Miller	Michigan State University
	Robert Esche	Phoenix Coyotes
Defenders	Bret Hedican	Florida Panthers
	Phil Housley	Calgary Flames
	Deron Quint	Columbus Blue Jackets
	Eric Weinrich	Boston Bruins
	Mark Eaton	Nashville Predators
	Hal Gill	Boston Bruins
	David Tanabe	Carolina Hurricanes
Forwards	Jim Campbell	Montreal Canadiens
	David Legwand	Nashville Predators
	Brian Gionta	Boston College
	Darby Hendrickson	Minnesota Wild
	Jeff Halpern	Washington Capitals
	Doug Brown	Detroit Red Wings
	Tim Connolly	New York Islanders
	Mike Knuble	Boston Bruins
	Derek Plante	Philadelphia Flyers
	Mark Parrish	New York Islanders
	Landon Wilson	Phoenix Coyotes
	Ryan Kraft	Kentucky Thoroughblades
	Craig Darby	Montreal Canadiens
Coaches	Lou Vairo	
	Curt Fraser	

Source: IIHF.

== Canada ==
Position	Player	Club
Goalkeepers	Roberto Luongo	Florida Panthers
	Dan Cloutier	Vancouver Canucks
	Fred Brathwaite	Calgary Flames
	Jean-Sébastien Giguère	Mighty Ducks of Anaheim
Defenders	Eric Brewer	Edmonton Oilers
	Wade Redden	Ottawa Senators
	Kyle McLaren	Boston Bruins
	Jason Smith	Edmonton Oilers
	Derek Morris	Calgary Flames
	Stéphane Robidas	Montreal Canadiens
	Brad Stuart	San Jose Sharks
Forwards	Vincent Lecavalier	Tampa Bay Lightning
	Brad Richards	Tampa Bay Lightning
	Patrick Marleau	San Jose Sharks
	Jeff Friesen	Mighty Ducks of Anaheim
	Daniel Marois	HC Ambrì-Piotta
	Brad Isbister	New York Islanders
	Rem Murray	Edmonton Oilers
	Joe Thornton	Boston Bruins
	Kirk Muller	Dallas Stars
	Scott Walker	Nashville Predators
	Steve Sullivan	Chicago Blackhawks
	Michael Peca	New York Islanders
	Brenden Morrow	Dallas Stars
	Kris Draper	Detroit Red Wings
	Wes Walz	Minnesota Wild
	Ryan Smyth	Edmonton Oilers
Coaches	Wayne Fleming	
	Guy Carbonneau	

Source: IIHF.

== Russia ==
Position	Player	Club
Goalkeepers	Denis Khlopotnov	CSKA Moscow
	Maxim Sokolov	Severstal Cherepovets
	Mikhail Shtalenkov	Dynamo Moscow
Defenders	Vitali Vishnevsky	Mighty Ducks of Anaheim
	Sergei Zhukov	Lokomotiv Yaroslavl
	Andrei Evstafiev	Lokomotiv Yaroslavl
	Dmitri Krasotkin	Lokomotiv Yaroslavl
	Oleg Tverdovsky	Mighty Ducks of Anaheim
	Evgeni Petrochinin	Severstal Cherepovets
	Alexander Zhdan	Ak Bars Kazan
	Oleg Orekhovsky	Dynamo Moscow
Forwards	Andrei Razin	Metallurg Magnitogorsk
	Pavel Datsyuk	Ak Bars Kazan
	Yuri Kuznetsov	Metallurg Magnitogorsk
	Anton But	Lokomotiv Yaroslavl
	Alexei Yashin	Ottawa Senators
	Aleksandr Kharitonov	Tampa Bay Lightning
	Alexander Golts	Metallurg Magnitogorsk
	Alexander Prokopiev	Avangard Omsk
	Ravil Gusmanov	Metallurg Magnitogorsk
	Alexander Kuvaldin	Dynamo Moscow
	Valeri Karpov	Lada Togliatti
	Alexander Korolyuk	San Jose Sharks
Coaches	Boris Mikhailov	
	Valeri Belousov	

Source: IIHF.

== Slovakia ==
Position	Player	Club
Goalkeepers	Rastislav Staňa	Moose Jaw Warriors
	Pavol Rybár	Slovan Bratislava
	Ján Lašák	Milwaukee Admirals
Defenders	Branislav Mezei	New York Islanders
	Zdeno Chára	New York Islanders
	Martin Štrbák	Slovnaft Vsetín
	Ivan Droppa	Düsseldorfer EG
	Richard Lintner	Nashville Predators
	Richard Pavlikovský	HC Havířov
	Ľubomír Sekeráš	Minnesota Wild
Forwards	Marián Gáborík	Minnesota Wild
	Radovan Somík	Continental Zlín
	Vladimir Országh	Djurgårdens IF
	Marián Hossa	Ottawa Senators
	Richard Zedník	Montreal Canadiens
	Zdeno Cíger	Slovan Bratislava
	Jan Pardavý	Slovnaft Vsetín
	Ladislav Nagy	Phoenix Coyotes
	Miroslav Hlinka	Jokerit
	Róbert Petrovický	MODO
	Peter Bartoš	Minnesota Wild
	Andrej Nedorost	Keramika Plzeň
	Peter Pucher	Znojemští Orli
Coaches	Ján Filc	
	Ernest Bokroš	

Source: IIHF.

== Germany ==
Position	Player	Club
Goalkeepers	Leonardo Conti	Frankfurt Lions
	Christian Künast	Munich Barons
	Robert Müller	Adler Mannheim
Defenders	Jochen Molling	Kassel Huskies
	Jörg Mayr	Kölner Haie
	Heiko Smazal	Munich Barons
	Mirco Lüdemann	Kölner Haie
	Christoph Schubert	Munich Barons
	Andreas Renz	Serc Wild Wings
	Erich Goldmann	Essen Mosquitoes
	Dennis Seidenberg	Adler Mannheim
Forwards	Marcel Goc	SERC Wild Wings
	Sven Felski	Eisbären Berlin
	Wayne Hynes	Adler Mannheim
	Andreas Loth	Kassel Huskies
	Marco Sturm	San Jose Sharks
	Jürgen Rumrich	Nürnberg Ice Tigers
	Thomas Daffner	Kassel Huskies
	Daniel Kreutzer	Kassel Huskies
	Tobias Abstreiter	Kassel Huskies
	Thomas Greilinger	Serc Wild Wings
	Len Soccio	Hannover Scorpions
	Klaus Kathan	Kassel Huskies
	Mark MacKay	Serc Wild Wings
	Jan Benda	Jokerit
Coaches	Hans Zach	
	Bernhard Englbrecht	
	Ernst Höfner	

Source: IIHF.

== Switzerland ==
Position	Player	Club
Goalkeepers	Marco Bührer	EHC Chur
	Martin Gerber	SCL Tigers
	Lars Weibel	HC Davos
Defenders	Julien Vauclair	HC Lugano
	Patrick Sutter	EV Zug
	Mark Streit	ZSC Lions
	Martin Steinegger	SC Bern
	Goran Bezina	HC Fribourg-Gottéron
	Olivier Keller	HC Lugano
	Edgar Salis	ZSC Lions
	Mathias Seger	ZSC Lions
Forwards	Flavien Conne	HC Lugano
	Patric Della Rossa	ZSC Lions
	Alain Demuth	HC Ambrì-Piotta
	Gian-Marco Crameri	ZSC Lions
	Jean-Jacques Aeschlimann	HC Lugano
	Michel Zeiter	ZSC Lions
	Martin Plüss	EHC Kloten
	Marcel Jenni	Färjestad BK
	Sandy Jeannin	HC Lugano
	Marc Reichert	SC Bern
	Thomas Ziegler	Detroit Vipers
	Michel Riesen	Hamilton Bulldogs
Coaches	Ralph Krueger	
	Bengt-Åke Gustafsson	
	Jakob Kölliker	

Source: IIHF.

== Ukraine ==
Position	Player	Club
Goalkeepers	Kostiantyn Simchuk	Fort Wayne Komets
	Igor Karpenko	Metallurg Magnitogorsk
	Vadym Seliverstov	Sokil Kyiv
Defenders	Artyom Ostroushko	Neftekhimik Nizhnekamsk
	Serhiy Klymentiev	Metallurg Magnitogorsk
	Oleg Polkovnikov	Dynamo Moscow
	Olexander Savitsky	Lausitzer Füchse
	Andriy Sryubko	Syracuse Crunch
	Valeri Shyriaiev	HC La Chaux-de-Fonds
	Vyacheslav Zavalnyuk	Soviet Wings
	Vitali Liutkevych	Neftekhimik Nizhnekamsk
Forwards	Vasyl Bobrovnikov	Berkut-Kyiv
	Dimitri Khristich	Washington Capitals
	Vadim Slivchenko	Schwenninger Wild Wings
	Vadym Shakhraychuk	Avangard Omsk
	Vitaliy Lytvynenko	Lokomotiv Yaroslavl
	Valentyn Oletsky	Sokil Kyiv
	Bogdan Savenko	Sokil Kyiv
	Borys Protsenko	Wilkes-Barre/Scranton Penguins
	Oleksiy Lazarenko	Soviet Wings
	Roman Salnikov	Soviet Wings
	Olexander Matviychuk	Molot-Prikamye Perm
	Kostiantyn Kasianchuk	Sokil Kyiv
Coaches	Anatoli Bogdanov	
	Oleksandr Kulikov	
	Oleksandr Seukand	

Source: IIHF.

== Austria ==
Position	Player	Club
Goalkeepers	Michael Suttnig	Klagenfurter AC
	Claus Dalpiaz	HC Innsbruck
	Reinhard Divis	Leksands IF
Defenders	Gerhard Unterluggauer	EC Villach
	Dominic Lavoie	Hannover Scorpions
	Tom Searle	EC Villach
	Peter Kasper	HC Innsbruck
	Herbert Hohenberger	Augsburger Panther
	Martin Ulrich	Berlin Capitals
	Matthias Trattnig	University of Maine
Forwards	Andreas Pusnik	EC Villach
	Christoph Brandner	Klagenfurter AC
	Gerald Ressman	Klagenfurter AC
	Heimo Lindner	HC Innsbruck
	Oliver Setzinger	Ilves
	Philipp Lukas	EHC Linz
	Patrick Pilloni	Klangenfurter AC
	Gunther Lanzinger	EC Villach
	Mario Schaden	Klagenfurter AC
	Simon Wheeldon	Munich Barons
	Wolfgang Kromp	EC Villach
	Christian Perthaler	Klagenfurter AC
	Dieter Kalt	Kölner Haie
Coaches	Ron Kennedy	
	Gregory Holst	

Source: IIHF.

== Italy ==
Position	Player	Club
Goalkeepers	Andrea Carpano	HC Fassa
	Mike Rosati	Adler Mannheim
	Guenther Hell	HC Bolzano
Defenders	Leo Insam	Milano Vipers
	Michele Strazzabosco	Asiago Hockey AS
	Armin Helfer	Brunico SG
	Maurizio Mansi	Düsseldorfer EG
	Carlo Lorenzi	HC Alleghe
	Larry Rucchin	Milano Vipers
	Christopher Bartolone	Düsseldorfer EG
	Michael de Angelis	HC La Chaux-de-Fonds
Forwards	Armando Chelodi	HC Bolzano
	Lino de Toni	HC Alleghe
	Roland Ramoser	SV Ritten
	Scott Beattie	HC Genève-Servette
	Bruno Zarrillo	Kölner Haie
	Manuel de Toni	HC Alleghe
	Giuseppe Busillo	SERC Wild Wings
	Stefano Margoni	HC Fassa
	Mario Chitarroni	Nürnberg Ice Tigers
	Vezio Sacratini	Cardiff Devils
	Anthony Iob	HC Bolzano
	Dino Felicetti	EC Bad Nauheim
Coaches	Pat Cortina	
	Stefano Dapra	
	Ron Ivany	

Source: IIHF.

== Latvia ==
Position	Player	Club
Goalkeepers	Artūrs Irbe	Carolina Hurricanes
	Sergejs Naumovs	Leksands IF
Defenders	Kaspars Astašenko	Tampa Bay Lightning
	Viktors Ignatjevs	Leksands IF
	Normunds Sējējs	Becherovka Karlovy Vary
	Artūrs Kupaks	Idaho Steelheads
	Kārlis Skrastiņš	Nashville Predators
	Sandis Ozoliņš	Carolina Hurricanes
	Oļegs Sorokins	Slovan Bratislava
	Atvars Tribuncovs	REV Bremerhaven
Forwards	Vjaceslavs Fanduls	Kärpät
	Aleksandrs Beļavskis	IF Björklöven
	Grigorijs Panteļejevs	Lokomotiv Yaroslavl
	Leonids Tambijevs	Iserlohner EC
	Sergejs Žoltoks	Edmonton Oilers
	Harijs Vītoliņš	EHC Chur
	Aleksandrs Kerčs	Revierlöwen Oberhausen
	Artis Ābols	Nyköping Hockey
	Aleksandrs Semjonovs	IF Björklöven
	Aigars Cipruss	Jokerit
	Aleksandrs Macijevskis	Odense Bulldogs
	Juris Opulskis	EV Füssen
Coaches	Harolds Vasiļjevs	
	Aleksandrs Klinsovs	
	Vjačeslavs Nazarovs	

Source: IIHF.

== Belarus ==
Position	Player	Club
Goalkeepers	Sergei Shabanov	Metallurg Novokuznetsk
	Andrei Mezin	Berlin Capitals
	Leonid Fatikov	Lada Togliatti
Defenders	Oleg Khmyl	Lada Togliatti
	Oleg Romanov	Kärpät
	Sergei Erkovich	Metallurg Novokuznetsk
	Oleg Mikulchik	Soviet Wings
	Ruslan Salei	Mighty Ducks of Anaheim
	Sergei Stas	Augsburger Panther
	Aleksandr Zhurik	Avangard Omsk
	Vladimir Kopat	Severstal Cherepovets
Forwards	Alexander Andrievsky	Revierlöwen Oberhausen
	Viktor Karachun	EC Wilhelmshaven
	Andrei Kovalev	Revierlöwen Oberhausen
	Vasily Pankov	Augsburger Panther
	Andrei Skabelka	Lada Togliatti
	Alexei Kalyuzhny	Metallurg Magnitogorsk
	Oleg Antonenko	Torpedo Nizhny Novgorod
	Dmitry Starostenko	CSKA Moscow
	Konstantin Koltsov	Ak Bars Kazan
	Dmitry Pankov	Torpedo Nizhny Novgorod
	Vitaly Valui	Khimik-SKA Novopolotsk
	Alexander Galchenyuk	Asiago Hockey AS
Coaches	Anatoli Varivonchik	
	Vladimir Melenchuk	
	Vladimir Zakharov	

Source: IIHF.

== Norway ==
Position	Player	Club
Goalkeepers	Jonas Norgren	Storhamar Dragons
	Bjørge Josefsen	IK Oskarshamn
	Vidar Wold	Frisk Asker
Defenders	Martin Sellgren	Ferris State University
	Svein Enok Nørstebø	Linköpings HC
	Martin Knold	Linköpings HC
	Johnny Nilsen	Frisk Asker
	Mats Trygg	Färjestad BK
	Ketil Wold	Frisk Asker
	Bård Sørlie	Vålerenga
Forwards	Geir Svendsberget	Storhamar Dragons
	Mads Hansen	Storhamar Dragons
	Morten Fjeld	Hammarby IF
	Stig Vesterheim	Sparta Sarpsborg
	Marius Trygg	Färjestad BK
	Pål Johnsen	Leksands IF
	Trond Magnussen	Färjestad BK
	Anders Fredriksen	Tingsryds AIF
	Morten Ask	Vålerenga
	Kjell Nygård	Vålerenga
	Tore Vikingstad	Leksands IF
	Tommy Martinsen	Vålerenga
	Jan Morten Dahl	Trondheim IK
Coaches	Leif Boork	
	Arne Billkvam	
	Petter Thoresen	

Source: IIHF.

== Japan ==
Position	Player	Club
Goalkeepers	Shinichi Iwasaki	Kokudo
	Jiro Igor Nihei	Huddinge IK
	Yutaka Fukufuji	Kokudo
Defenders	Kengo Ito	Nippon Paper Cranes
	Fumitaka Miyauchi	Kokudo
	Makoto Kawashima	Oji
	Daniel Daikawa	Seibu
	Tatsuki Katayama	Kokudo
	Yutaka Kawaguchi	Kokudo
	Akihito Isojima	Oji
	Hiroyuki Miura	Kokudo
Forwards	Hiroyuki Murakami	Huddinge IK
	Tomohiko Uchiyama	Kokudo
	Takahito Suzuki	Kokudo
	Yasunori Iwata	Oji
	Makoto Kawahira	Oji
	Masaki Shirono	Oji
	Shin Yahata	Kokudo
	Junji Sakata	Kokudo
	Kiyoshi Fujita	Seibu
	Taro Ivan Nihei	Kokudo
	Ryan Kuwabara	Kokudo
	Chris Yule	Kokudo
Coaches	Steven Tsujiura	
	Seigo Hanyu	
	Glen Williamson	

Source: IIHF.
