= Kapanen =

Kapanen is a Finnish surname. Notable people with the surname include:

- Hannu Kapanen (born 1951), Finnish ice hockey player
- Kasperi Kapanen (born 1996), Finnish professional ice hockey forward
- Kimmo Kapanen (born 1974), Finnish professional ice hockey goaltender
- Niko Kapanen (born 1978), Finnish professional ice hockey centre
- Oliver Kapanen (born 2003), Finnish professional ice hockey centre
- Sami Kapanen (born 1973), Finnish professional ice hockey forward
