= Yuri Kuznetsov (ice hockey, born 1965) =

Russian ice hockey player

- Born: January 31, 1965 (age 60); Moscow, USSR
- Height: 5 ft 10 in (178 cm)
- Weight: 192 lb (87 kg; 13 st 10 lb)
- Position: Defence
- Shot: Right
- Played for: RSL; Krylia Sovetov; Lokomotiv Yaroslavl; SM-liiga; SaiPa; HIFK; Elitserien; IF Björklöven
- Playing career: 1985–2003

Yuri Kuznetsov (Russian Юрий Кузнецов, born 31 January 1965) is a Russian former ice hockey player.

== Career ==
=== Early career in Russia ===
Kuznetsov started his professional career in 1985, playing in Russia for Krylya Sovetov Moscow of the Soviet Hockey League and Voronezh Buran of the Vysshaya Liga until 1993.

=== Finland ===
After one year in Swedish Elitserien, he joined HIFK in the SM-liiga, where he played for 3 seasons. At the beginning of the 1997–1998 season he moved to SaiPa where Kuznetsov stayed for nearly five seasons. During the middle of the 2001–02 season, Kuznetsov left SaiPa and returned to his homeland and the Lokomotiv Yaroslavl after nine years spent abroad.

Overall, Kuznetsov played in 388 matches in SM-liiga and scored 53 goals, 119 assists and 172 points. He collected 305 penalty minutes. Kuznetsov belonged to the best defenders of the league, scoring 36 points in each of the seasons 1999–2000 and 2000–2001.

=== Retirement ===
After half of a season in Russia, Kuznetsov returned to Finland to play the 2002–2003 season for Hokki in Mestis, which was the final year of his career.

== Career statistics ==
			Regular Season					Playoffs
Season	Team	League	GP	G	A	Pts	PIM	GP	G	A	Pts	PIM
85/86	Krylia Sovetov	RSL	40	0	2	2	20
86/87	Krylia Sovetov	RSL	12	0	0	0	6
86/87	Voronezh Buran	Vys.	20	5	3	8	6
87/88	Voronezh Buran	Vys.	65	13	11	24	62
89/90	Krylia Sovetov	RSL	52	0	2	2	26
90/91	Krylia Sovetov	RSL	23	1	2	3	12
91/92	Krylia Sovetov	RSL	30	4	1	5	14
92/93	Krylia Sovetov	RSL	42	8	2	10	14	7	0	1	1	0
93/94	IF Björklöven	Elitserien	22	4	5	9	10
93/94	IF Björklöven	Allsvenskan	17	3	1	4	30	2	0	0	0	2
94/95	HIFK	SM-liiga	49	9	18	27	56	3	0	1	1	0
95/96	HIFK	SM-liiga	50	6	11	17	75	3	0	0	0	0
96/97	HIFK	SM-liiga	48	6	14	20	32
97/98	SaiPa	SM-liiga	48	6	5	11	44	3	0	0	0	2
98/99	SaiPa	SM-liiga	54	3	15	18	34	7	2	2	4	2
99/00	SaiPa	SM-liiga	54	12	24	36	18
00/01	SaiPa	SM-liiga	55	9	27	36	34
01/02	SaiPa	SM-liiga	30	2	5	7	12
01/02	Lokomotiv Yaroslavl	RSL	20	2	2	4	8	9	0	0	0	14
02/03	Hokki	Mestis	8	0	2	2	6
Totals			739	93	152	245	519	34	2	4	6	20
SM-liiga			388	53	119	172	305	16	2	3	5	4
Russian Superleague			219	15	11	26	100	16	0	1	1	14
Elitserien			22	4	5	9	10

== See also ==
- Kuznetsov should not be confused with Yuri Kuznetsov (b. Novosibirsk 1971), Russian ice hockey left wing who played for Russia in the 2001 IIHF World Championship.
