= Yury Kuznetsov =

Yury Kuznetsov may refer to:

- Yury Kuznetsov (actor) (born 1946), Russian film and theatre actor
- Yuri Kuznetsov (footballer, born 1931) (1931–2016), Soviet footballer for FC Neftyanik Baku, FC Dynamo Moscow and national team
- Yuri Kuznetsov (footballer, born 1958), Russian footballer for FC KAMAZ Naberezhnye Chelny and FC Rubin Kazan
- Yuri Kuznetsov (footballer, born 1974), Russian footballer for FC Dynamo Moscow
- Yuri Kuznetsov (ice hockey, born 1965), Russian ice hockey defenceman who mostly played in Finland
- Yuri Kuznetsov (ice hockey, born 1971), Russian ice hockey left wing who played in the 2001 IIHF World Championship
- Yury Kuznetsov (diplomat) (born 1928), Soviet diplomat
- Yuri A. Kuznetsov, mathematician
- Yuri Viktorovich Kuznetsov (1946–2020), military officer, Hero of the Soviet Union
- Yuri Vasilievich Kuznetsov (1969) Russian Lieutenant-General
