= Hannu Kapanen =

Finnish ice hockey player

- Born: March 13, 1951 (age 74); Kontiolahti, FIN
- Height: 5 ft 9 in (175 cm)
- Weight: 167 lb (76 kg; 11 st 13 lb)
- Position: Forward
- Shot: Left
- Played for: SM-liiga; Jokerit; HIFK; 1. Divisioona; Jokipojat
- National team: Finland
- Playing career: 1975–1985

Hannu Mauri Antero Kapanen (born March 13, 1951, in Kontiolahti, Finland) is a retired professional ice hockey player who played in the SM-liiga. He played for Jokerit and HIFK. He was inducted into the Finnish Hockey Hall of Fame in 2005.

Hannu Kapanen has also had a long and successful career as head coach in SM-liiga.

== Personal life ==
Hannu's sons Sami and Kimmo and his brother Jari Kapanen are former professional ice hockey players. His grandsons Kasperi, Oliver and Konsta Kapanen are all professional ice hockey players.

Preceded by Sakari Pietilä	Winner of the Kalevi Numminen trophy 1996-97	Succeeded by Erkka Westerlund
Preceded by Juha Junno	Head Coach of KalPa; 1993-1994	Succeeded by Anatoli Bogdanov
Preceded by Harri Rindell	Head Coach of HIFK; 1994-1996	Succeeded by Mike Eaves
Preceded by Sakari Pietilä	Head Coach of HPK; 1996-1997	Succeeded by Kari Heikkilä
Preceded by Curt Lundmark	Head Coach of Jokerit; 1998-1999	Succeeded by Timo Lahtinen
Preceded by Niki Anderson	Head Coach of Blues; 2001-2003	Succeeded by Ted Sator
