= Artturi Lehkonen =

Finnish ice hockey player (born 1995)

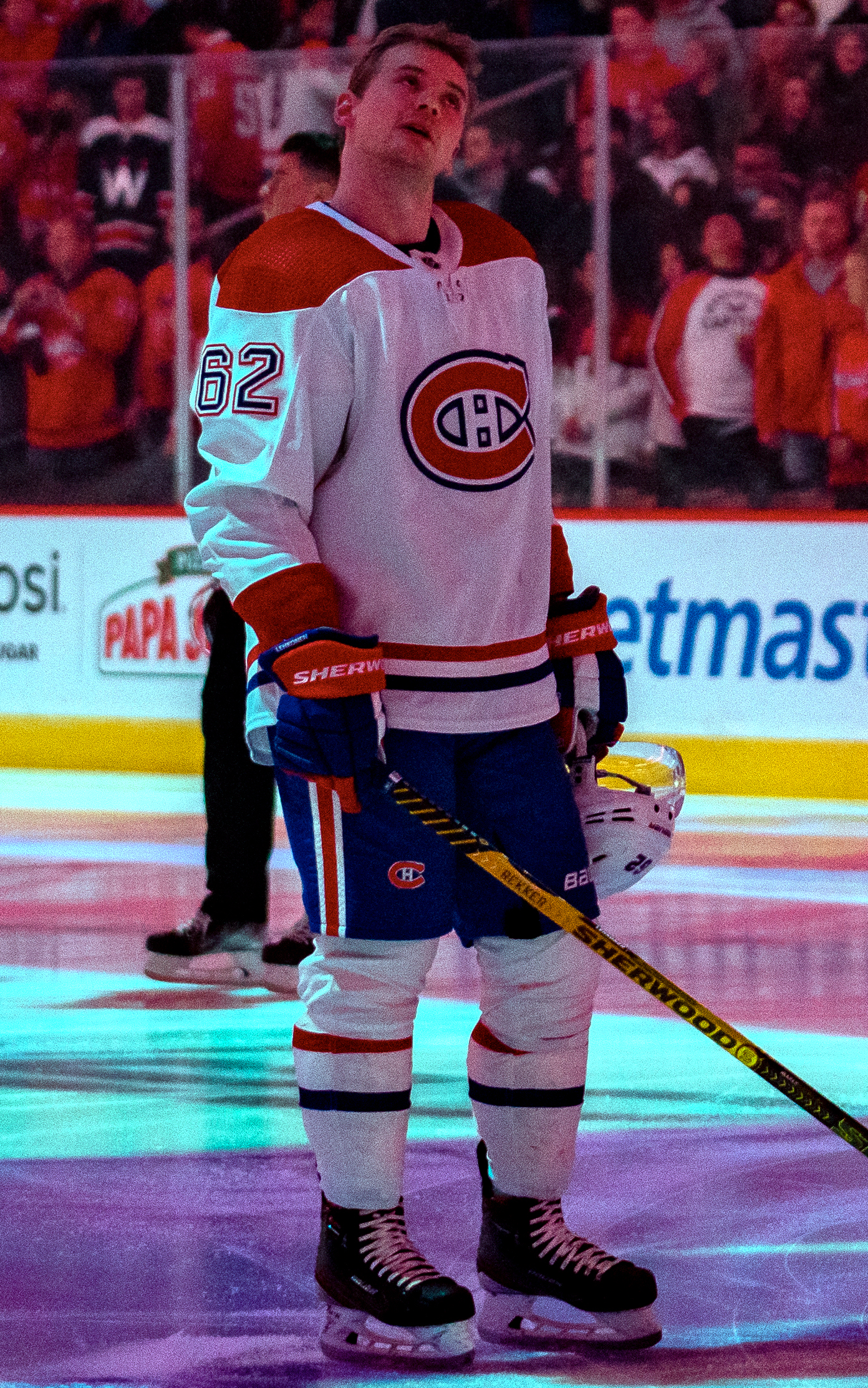
- Lehkonen with the Montreal Canadiens in 2021
- Born: 4 July 1995 (age 31) Piikkiö, Finland
- Height: 5 ft 11 in (180 cm)
- Weight: 178 lb (81 kg; 12 st 10 lb)
- Position: Left wing
- Shoots: Left
- NHL team Former teams: Colorado Avalanche; TPS; KalPa; Frölunda HC; Montreal Canadiens
- National team: Finland
- NHL draft: 55th overall, 2013; Montreal Canadiens
- Playing career: 2011–present

Artturi Aleksanteri Lehkonen (born 4 July 1995) is a Finnish professional ice hockey player who is a left winger for the Colorado Avalanche of the National Hockey League (NHL). He was selected in the second round, 55th overall, by the Montreal Canadiens in the 2013 NHL entry draft, where he spent the first six seasons of his NHL career. Known as a defensively-minded forward, Lehkonen famously scored series-winning overtime goals in two consecutive Stanley Cup semifinals against the Vegas Golden Knights (2021) and Edmonton Oilers (2022). He won the Stanley Cup with the Avalanche in 2022, scoring the Stanley Cup-clinching goal in game six of the Final.

Internationally, Lehkonen has competed for the Finnish men's national team, winning medals at the U18 and U20 world championships.

== Playing career ==
Lehkonen was born in Piikkiö, but grew up in Turku. He played for TuTo and TPS as a youngster and logged his first minutes in Finland's top-flight Liiga for TPS during the 2011–12 season. He then joined fellow Liiga outfit KalPa prior to the 2012–13 campaign.

On 28 March 2014, Lehkonen opted to leave KalPa of the Finnish Liiga and further his development in the Swedish Hockey League (SHL), in signing a two-year contract with Frölunda HC. In his second year in Sweden, the 2015–16 season, he made 49 SHL appearances, tallying 16 goals and 17 assists in the regular season plus 16 games in postseason play with a league-best eleven goals and eight assists en route to claiming the title. The 19 points tallied beat Daniel Alfredsson 2004–05 playoffs performance (18pts) to establish a new team record for most points in a single playoff year. He was also influential in winning the Champions Hockey League that season, chipping in with twelve points (five goals, seven assists) in 13 outings.

=== Montreal Canadiens ===
Lehkonen signed a three-year, entry-level contract with the Montreal Canadiens of the National Hockey League (NHL) on 8 May 2016. In his debut season with the team, he scored 18 goals across 73 games, with an additional 10 assists. He would manage 12 goals and 9 assists the following season. On 3 October 2018, Lehkonen scored the Canadiens' first goal of the 2018–19 season in a 3–2 overtime loss to the Toronto Maple Leafs. He would have a career-best 31 points in the final year of his entry-level contract. On 11 July 2019, the Canadiens re-signed Lehkonen to a two-year, $4.8 million contract extension.

Lehkonen managed only seven goals and six assists during the pandemic-shortened 2020–21 season. The Canadiens qualified to the 2021 Stanley Cup playoffs in the final wildcard spot, and embarked on an unexpectedly deep run, defeating the Toronto Maple Leafs and the Winnipeg Jets in the first two rounds. On 24 June 2021, Lehkonen scored the series-clinching overtime goal in game six of the Stanley Cup semifinals against the Vegas Golden Knights, allowing the Canadiens to advance to the Stanley Cup Final for the first time since 1993. Dubbed "the biggest goal for the Canadiens in nearly 30 years," it became a frequent topic of discussion around Lehkonen. Following the team's loss to the Tampa Bay Lightning in the Cup Final, the Canadiens re-signed Lehkonen to a one-year, $2.3 million contract extension.

Following the Cup Final appearance, the 2021–22 season saw the Canadiens perform historically poorly, resulting in the sacking of longtime general manager Marc Bergevin. At a time when most of the team's roster was judged to be underperforming, Lehkonen's strong defensive play attracted praise, and began to generate speculation that he would be traded as part of a team rebuild. Lehkonen when asked joked "he couldn't understand most of the trade talk in Montreal. He doesn't speak French."

=== Colorado Avalanche ===
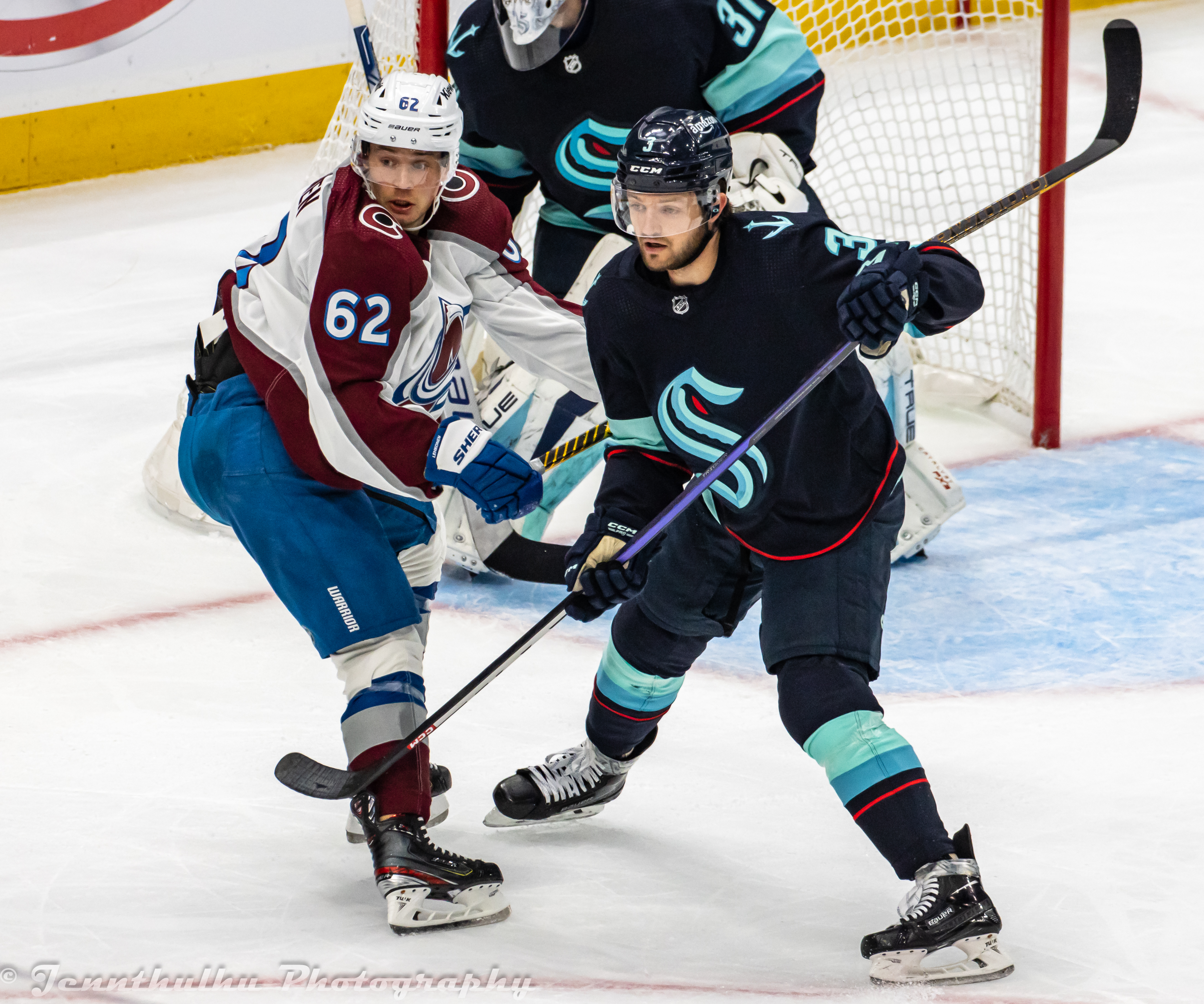
Lehkonen (left) during the 2023 Stanley Cup playoffs.

On 21 March 2022, Lehkonen was traded by the Canadiens to the Colorado Avalanche in exchange for Justin Barron and a second-round pick in the 2024 NHL entry draft. His debut with the Avalanche was delayed due to visa issues, but he featured in 16 regular season games for the team, tallying a further 6 goals and 3 assists to set new career highs in goals (19) and points (38). The Avalanche finished second in the NHL, and met the Nashville Predators in the first round of the 2022 Stanley Cup playoffs. After sweeping the Predators in four games, the Avalanche went on to beat the St. Louis Blues in six games in the second round, moving on to the Western Conference final against the Edmonton Oilers. Lehkonen's strong performance with the team through the playoffs attracted praise as one of the best deadline additions of the postseason. In game four of the series, Lehkonen scored the series-clinching goal in overtime to win the Clarence S. Campbell Bowl and send his team to the Stanley Cup Final for the second consecutive year. He became the first player to achieve this feat since Gordie Drillon of the Maple Leafs in 1938 and 1939. Lehkonen scored the series-winning goal in game six of the Cup Final, noting "I've been on both sides, on the losing side and now on the winning side. It feels great."

== International play ==
Medal record

Men's ice hockey

Representing Finland

Winter Olympics
| Bronze medal – third place | 2026 Milano Cortina | |

World Junior Championships
| Gold medal – first place | 2014 Malmö | |

World U18 Championships
| Bronze medal – third place | 2013 Russia | |

Lehkonen made his debut with Finland's men's national team during the 2015–16 Euro Hockey Tour.

He represented Finland at the 2026 Winter Olympics and won a bronze medal.

== Personal life ==
Lehkonen's father is Ismo Lehkonen, a former professional hockey player and coach. Ismo has worked for Yle as a hockey commentator, notably being present in Amalie Arena in 2022 to cover his son's victory in the Stanley Cup Final.

Lehkonen is a supporter of Arsenal F.C.

== Career statistics ==
=== Regular season and playoffs ===
| | | | Regular season | | | | | Playoffs |
| Season | Team | League | GP | G | A | Pts | PIM | GP | G | A | Pts | PIM |
|---|---|---|---|---|---|---|---|---|---|---|---|---|
| 2010–11 | TPS | FIN U18 | 20 | 13 | 11 | 24 | 16 | 13 | 8 | 6 | 14 | 4 |
| 2010–11 | TPS | FIN U20 | 2 | 0 | 1 | 1 | 0 | — | — | — | — | — |
| 2011–12 | TPS | FIN U18 | 2 | 2 | 5 | 7 | 0 | 4 | 3 | 4 | 7 | 2 |
| 2011–12 | TPS | FIN U20 | 40 | 28 | 26 | 54 | 54 | — | — | — | — | — |
| 2011–12 | TPS | SM-l | 18 | 2 | 2 | 4 | 8 | 2 | 0 | 0 | 0 | 0 |
| 2012–13 | KalPa | SM-l | 45 | 14 | 16 | 30 | 12 | 4 | 2 | 1 | 3 | 2 |
| 2013–14 | KalPa | Liiga | 33 | 7 | 13 | 20 | 4 | — | — | — | — | — |
| 2014–15 | Frölunda HC | SHL | 47 | 8 | 8 | 16 | 12 | 13 | 3 | 3 | 6 | 0 |
| 2015–16 | Frölunda HC | SHL | 49 | 16 | 17 | 33 | 12 | 16 | 11 | 8 | 19 | 4 |
| 2016–17 | Montreal Canadiens | NHL | 73 | 18 | 10 | 28 | 8 | 6 | 2 | 2 | 4 | 2 |
| 2017–18 | Montreal Canadiens | NHL | 66 | 12 | 9 | 21 | 20 | — | — | — | — | — |
| 2018–19 | Montreal Canadiens | NHL | 82 | 11 | 20 | 31 | 32 | — | — | — | — | — |
| 2019–20 | Montreal Canadiens | NHL | 70 | 13 | 14 | 27 | 24 | 10 | 1 | 3 | 4 | 8 |
| 2020–21 | Montreal Canadiens | NHL | 47 | 7 | 6 | 13 | 6 | 17 | 3 | 1 | 4 | 4 |
| 2021–22 | Montreal Canadiens | NHL | 58 | 13 | 16 | 29 | 14 | — | — | — | — | — |
| 2021–22 | Colorado Avalanche | NHL | 16 | 6 | 3 | 9 | 8 | 20 | 8 | 6 | 14 | 20 |
| 2022–23 | Colorado Avalanche | NHL | 64 | 21 | 30 | 51 | 28 | 7 | 3 | 3 | 6 | 6 |
| 2023–24 | Colorado Avalanche | NHL | 45 | 16 | 18 | 34 | 14 | 11 | 6 | 5 | 11 | 4 |
| 2024–25 | Colorado Avalanche | NHL | 69 | 27 | 18 | 45 | 34 | 7 | 3 | 1 | 4 | 4 |
| 2025–26 | Colorado Avalanche | NHL | 70 | 21 | 27 | 48 | 16 | 11 | 3 | 3 | 6 | 2 |
| Liiga totals | | | 96 | 23 | 31 | 54 | 24 | 6 | 2 | 1 | 3 | 2 |
| SHL totals | | | 96 | 24 | 25 | 49 | 24 | 29 | 14 | 11 | 25 | 4 |
| NHL totals | | | 660 | 165 | 171 | 336 | 204 | 89 | 29 | 24 | 53 | 50 |

=== International ===
| Year | Team | Event | Result | GP | G | A | Pts | PIM |
|---|---|---|---|---|---|---|---|---|
| 2011 | Finland | U17 | 7th | 5 | 1 | 1 | 2 | 0 |
| 2011 | Finland | IH18 | 4th | 5 | 2 | 3 | 5 | 4 |
| 2012 | Finland | WJC18 | 4th | 7 | 7 | 3 | 10 | 6 |
| 2013 | Finland | WJC | 7th | 6 | 3 | 1 | 4 | 4 |
| 2013 | Finland | WJC18 | 3rd place, bronze medalist(s) | 7 | 3 | 6 | 9 | 12 |
| 2014 | Finland | WJC | 1st place, gold medalist(s) | 6 | 2 | 2 | 4 | 2 |
| 2015 | Finland | WJC | 7th | 5 | 1 | 0 | 1 | 6 |
| 2025 | Finland | 4NF | 4th | 3 | 0 | 1 | 1 | 0 |
| 2026 | Finland | OG | 3rd place, bronze medalist(s) | 6 | 2 | 4 | 6 | 4 |
| Junior totals | | | | 41 | 19 | 16 | 35 | 34 |
| Senior totals | | | | 9 | 2 | 5 | 7 | 4 |

== Awards and honours ==
| Award | Year | Ref |
SHL
| Le Mat Trophy champion | 2016 | |
CHL
| Champion | 2016 | |
NHL
| Stanley Cup champion | 2022 | |
