= Ismo Lehkonen =

Finnish ice hockey player and coach

- Born: February 1, 1962 (age 64) Helsinki, Finland
- Height: 5 ft 11 in (180 cm)
- Weight: 168 lb (76 kg; 12 st 0 lb)
- Position: Forward
- Shot: Left
- Played for: Jokerit; HPK
- NHL draft: Undrafted
- Playing career: 1980–1991

Ismo Lehkonen (born February 1, 1962) is a Finnish former professional ice hockey player. He is currently the head coach of the TUTO Hockey in the Finnish Mestis. His son Artturi Lehkonen is a professional hockey player for the Colorado Avalanche of the National Hockey League.

Lehkonen was the head coach of HIFK of the Finnish SM-liiga from 1999 to 2001. On January 23, 2015, he was named head coach of the Estonia men's national ice hockey team, replacing Sakari Pietila.

A sometime commentator for Finnish broadcaster Yle, he covered the 2022 Stanley Cup Finals in-person, observing his son Artturi win the Stanley Cup.
