= Martin Steinegger (ice hockey) =

Swiss ice hockey player

- Born: February 15, 1972 (age 54) Biel/Bienne, SUI
- Height: 6 ft 2 in (188 cm)
- Weight: 203 lb (92 kg; 14 st 7 lb)
- Position: Defence
- Shot: Left
- Played for: EHC Biel; SC Bern
- National team: Switzerland
- Playing career: 1990–2012

Martin Steinegger (born February 15, 1972) is a Swiss professional ice hockey defenceman. He played in the Nationalliga A for EHC Biel and SC Bern. He won the Swiss-A championship in 1997 and 2004 with SC Bern.

== International Play ==
On April 24, 2006 Steinegger played his 200th game for the Swiss national team.

== Career statistics ==
=== Regular season and playoffs ===
			Regular season					Playoffs
Season	Team	League	GP	G	A	Pts	PIM	GP	G	A	Pts	PIM
1988–89	EHC Biel	SUI.2 U20
1989–90	EHC Biel	SUI.2 U20
1990–91	EHC Biel	SUI.2 U20
1990–91	EHC Biel	NDA	34	0	0	0	8	3	0	0	0	2
1991–92	EHC Biel	SUI U20
1991–92	EHC Biel	NDA	35	4	2	6	42	4	0	1	1	4
1992–93	EHC Biel	SUI U20
1992–93	EHC Biel	NDA	33	2	9	11	53	4	0	2	2	6
1993–94	EHC Biel	NDA	36	5	5	10	80	—	—	—	—	—
1994–95	EHC Biel	NDA	36	5	7	12	44	—	—	—	—	—
1995–96	SC Bern	NDA	36	6	13	19	62	11	2	4	6	20
1996–97	SC Bern	NDA	43	2	11	13	64	13	3	3	6	18
1997–98	SC Bern	NDA	37	5	12	17	62	7	1	0	1	8
1998–99	SC Bern	NDA	42	10	13	23	80	6	0	1	1	16
1999–2000	SC Bern	NLA	44	8	10	18	70	5	1	1	2	16
2000–01	SC Bern	NLA	41	4	14	18	89	10	4	4	8	18
2001–02	SC Bern	NLA	43	8	16	24	116	6	1	2	3	4
2002–03	SC Bern	NLA	44	6	7	13	99	13	2	2	4	26
2003–04	SC Bern	NLA	36	4	15	19	80	15	0	5	5	56
2004–05	SC Bern	NLA	44	8	16	24	72	11	1	4	5	31
2005–06	SC Bern	NLA	39	0	6	6	56	6	1	0	1	8
2006–07	SC Bern	NLA	35	1	6	7	58	17	0	1	1	28
2007–08	SC Bern	NLA	39	1	5	6	95	6	1	0	1	12
2008–09	EHC Biel	NLA	26	1	7	8	42	—	—	—	—	—
2009–10	EHC Biel	NLA	48	4	10	14	112	—	—	—	—	—
2010–11	EHC Biel	NLA	46	1	14	15	54	—	—	—	—	—
2011–12	EHC Biel	NLA	26	0	1	1	55	5	0	1	1	4
NDA/NLA totals			843	85	199	284	1493	142	17	31	48	277

=== International ===
Year	Team	Event	GP	G	A	Pts	PIM
1990	Switzerland	EJC	6	0	0	0	4
1992	Switzerland	WJC	6	0	0	0	8
1993	Switzerland	WC	7	0	0	0	6
1995	Switzerland	WC	6	0	0	0	0
1997	Switzerland	WC B	7	0	3	3	6
1998	Switzerland	WC	9	2	1	3	10
1999	Switzerland	WC	6	0	0	0	10
2000	Switzerland	WC	7	0	0	0	2
2001	Switzerland	WC	6	1	1	2	2
2002	Switzerland	OG	4	0	0	0	6
2002	Switzerland	WC	6	1	1	2	6
2003	Switzerland	WC	7	0	0	0	10
2004	Switzerland	WC	7	0	1	1	4
2006	Switzerland	WC	6	0	0	0	4
2007	Switzerland	WC	4	0	0	0	6
Junior totals			12	0	0	0	12
Senior totals			82	4	7	11	72
