= Vadim Slivchenko =

Ukrainian ice hockey player

- Born: March 28, 1970 (age 55) Kharkiv, Ukraine
- Height: 5 ft 10 in (178 cm)
- Weight: 190 lb (86 kg; 13 st 8 lb)
- Position: Right wing
- Shot: Left
- Played for: Ukraine; Sokil Kyiv; ECHL; Greensboro Monarchs; Wheeling Thunderbirds; Wheeling Nailers; CoHL; Chatham Wheels; IHL; Houston Aeros; SHL; Färjestad BK; DEL; Schwenninger Wild Wings; Frankfurt Lions; EHC Freiburg; Krefeld Pinguine; Austria/Germany; Wiener EV; ETC Crimmitschau
- National team: Ukraine
- NHL draft: Undrafted
- Playing career: 1992–2008

Vadim Slivchenko (born March 28, 1970) is a Ukrainian retired professional ice hockey player.

Slivchenko competed at the 1999 and 2001 IIHF World Championships as a member of the Ukraine men's national ice hockey team. He also competed with Team Ukraine at the 2002 Winter Olympics.

== Career statistics ==
=== Regular season and playoffs ===
| | | | Regular season | | | | | Playoffs |
| Season | Team | League | GP | G | A | Pts | PIM | GP | G | A | Pts | PIM |
|---|---|---|---|---|---|---|---|---|---|---|---|---|
| 1989–90 | Dynamo Kharkiv | URS | 26 | 2 | 2 | 4 | 4 | — | — | — | — | — |
| 1990–91 | Dynamo Kharkiv | URS.2 | 63 | 12 | 3 | 15 | 35 | — | — | — | — | — |
| 1991–92 | Dynamo Kharkiv | CIS.2 | 50 | 14 | 5 | 19 | 34 | — | — | — | — | — |
| 1992–93 | Dynamo Kharkiv | RUS | 2 | 2 | 2 | 4 | 0 | — | — | — | — | — |
| 1992–93 | Chatham Wheels | CoHL | 46 | 27 | 30 | 57 | 12 | — | — | — | — | — |
| 1992–93 | Greensboro Monarchs | ECHL | 11 | 3 | 6 | 9 | 6 | 1 | 0 | 1 | 1 | 0 |
| 1993–94 | Wheeling Thunderbirds | ECHL | 45 | 39 | 46 | 85 | 65 | 6 | 1 | 3 | 4 | 2 |
| 1994–95 | Wheeling Thunderbirds | ECHL | 49 | 37 | 39 | 76 | 75 | — | — | — | — | — |
| 1994–95 | Houston Aeros | IHL | 29 | 8 | 9 | 17 | 30 | 2 | 1 | 0 | 1 | 0 |
| 1995–96 | Houston Aeros | IHL | 81 | 24 | 28 | 52 | 44 | — | — | — | — | — |
| 1996–97 | CE Wien | AUT | 32 | 32 | 27 | 59 | 46 | — | — | — | — | — |
| 1997–98 | Wiener EV | AUT | 42 | 32 | 28 | 60 | 66 | — | — | — | — | — |
| 1998–99 | Wiener EV | AUT | 44 | 33 | 35 | 68 | 68 | — | — | — | — | — |
| 1999–2000 | Färjestad BK | SEL | 17 | 3 | 5 | 8 | 26 | — | — | — | — | — |
| 1999–2000 | Hammarby IF | Allsv | 10 | 2 | 6 | 8 | 20 | 2 | 0 | 0 | 0 | 6 |
| 1999–2000 | Wheeling Nailers | ECHL | 9 | 2 | 7 | 9 | 6 | — | — | — | — | — |
| 2000–01 | SERC Wild Wings | DEL | 51 | 26 | 27 | 53 | 65 | — | — | — | — | — |
| 2001–02 | Frankfurt Lions | DEL | 57 | 19 | 30 | 49 | 34 | — | — | — | — | — |
| 2002–03 | SERC Wild Wings | DEL | 45 | 10 | 12 | 22 | 51 | — | — | — | — | — |
| 2003–04 | Wölfe Freiburg | DEL | 52 | 13 | 32 | 45 | 48 | — | — | — | — | — |
| 2004–05 | Krefeld Pinguine | DEL | 30 | 2 | 7 | 9 | 12 | — | — | — | — | — |
| 2005–06 | ETC Crimmitschau | GER.3 | 48 | 32 | 29 | 61 | 57 | 6 | 1 | 5 | 6 | 4 |
| 2006–07 | ETC Crimmitschau | GER.2 | 51 | 17 | 22 | 39 | 54 | — | — | — | — | — |
| 2007–08 | Wheeling Nailers | ECHL | 42 | 10 | 7 | 17 | 24 | — | — | — | — | — |
| ECHL totals | | | 156 | 91 | 105 | 196 | 176 | 7 | 1 | 4 | 5 | 2 |
| IHL totals | | | 110 | 32 | 37 | 69 | 74 | 2 | 1 | 0 | 1 | 0 |
| DEL totals | | | 235 | 70 | 108 | 178 | 210 | 7 | 2 | 3 | 5 | 0 |

=== International ===
| Year | Team | Event | GP | G | A | Pts | PIM |
|---|---|---|---|---|---|---|---|
| 1999 | Ukraine | WC | 3 | 0 | 0 | 0 | 0 |
| 2001 | Ukraine | WC | 6 | 4 | 0 | 4 | 0 |
| 2002 | Ukraine | OG | 4 | 0 | 0 | 0 | 0 |
| Senior totals | | | 13 | 4 | 0 | 4 | 0 |
