= Jochen Molling =

German ice hockey player

- Born: 9 August 1973 (age 51); Berlin, Germany
- Height: 6 ft 1 in (185 cm)
- Weight: 220 lb (100 kg; 15 st 10 lb)
- Position: Defense
- Shot: Left
- Played for: Berliner SC Preussen; ESG Füchse Sachsen; Berlin Capitals; Kassel Huskies; SERC Wild Wings; Adler Mannheim; Hamburg Freezers; Bietigheim Steelers; Augsburger Panther; Wölfe Freiburg; ECC Preussen Juniors
- National team: Germany
- NHL draft: Undrafted
- Playing career: 1991–2011

Jochen Molling (born 9 August 1973) is a German ice hockey player. He competed in the men's tournament at the 1998 Winter Olympics.

== Career statistics ==
=== Regular season and playoffs ===
			Regular season					Playoffs
Season	Team	League	GP	G	A	Pts	PIM	GP	G	A	Pts	PIM
1991–92	Berliner SC Preussen	1.GBun	4	0	0	0	0	7	0	0	0	0
1992–93	Berliner SC Preussen	1.GBun	42	0	2	2	16	7	0	0	0	2
1993–94	Berliner SC Preussen	1.GBun	41	0	1	1	6	11	0	0	0	2
1994–95	Berliner SC Preussen	DEL	42	0	5	5	8	12	0	0	0	6
1995–96	ESG Füchse Sachsen	DEL	50	1	0	1	50	—	—	—	—	—
1996–97	Berlin Capitals	DEL	43	1	1	2	26	4	0	0	0	6
1997–98	Berlin Capitals	DEL	40	0	2	2	46	4	0	0	0	2
1998–99	Kassel Huskies	DEL	43	0	3	3	34	—	—	—	—	—
1999–2000	Kassel Huskies	DEL	53	1	1	2	77	5	0	0	0	0
2000–01	Kassel Huskies	DEL	60	3	5	8	36	8	0	1	1	4
2001–02	Kassel Huskies	DEL	44	0	6	6	46	7	1	0	1	2
2002–03	SERC Wild Wings	DEL	27	1	4	5	28	—	—	—	—	—
2002–03	Hamburg Freezers	DEL	31	0	2	2	24	2	0	0	0	2
2003–04	Adler Mannheim	DEL	42	1	2	3	28	5	1	1	2	4
2004–05	Hamburg Freezers	DEL	51	0	3	3	46	6	0	0	0	2
2005–06	Bietigheim Steelers	GER.2	50	2	4	6	48	7	1	2	3	8
2006–07	Bietigheim Steelers	GER.2	46	1	6	7	80	—	—	—	—	—
2007–08	Augsburger Panther	DEL	56	0	0	0	20	—	—	—	—	—
2008–09	Wölfe Freiburg	GER.2	44	1	7	8	38	—	—	—	—	—
2009–10	ECC Preussen Juniors	GER.4	4	1	0	1	2	—	—	—	—	—
2010–11	ECC Preussen Juniors	GER.3	31	5	6	11	70	—	—	—	—	—
1.GBun totals			87	0	3	3	22	25	0	0	0	4
DEL totals			582	8	34	42	469	53	2	2	4	28

=== International ===
Year	Team	Event	GP	G	A	Pts	PIM
1991	Germany	EJC	5	0	0	0	6
1993	Germany	WJC	7	0	0	0	8
1997	Germany	WC	8	0	0	0	4
1998	Germany	OG	4	0	0	0	4
1999	Germany	WC B	7	0	0	0	8
2000	Germany	OGQ	3	1	0	1	0
2000	Germany	WC B	7	0	1	1	8
2001	Germany	OGQ	3	0	0	0	0
2001	Germany	WC	7	0	0	0	2
2002	Germany	WC	7	0	1	1	2
2003	Germany	WC	2	0	0	0	4
2004	Germany	WC	6	0	0	0	6
Junior totals			12	0	0	0	14
Senior totals			54	1	2	3	38
