= Timo Lahtinen =

Finnish ice hockey player and coach

- Born: 24 May 1947 (age 79) Tampere, Finland
- Height: 6 ft 0 in (183 cm)
- Weight: 187 lb (85 kg; 13 st 5 lb)
- Position: Forward
- Shot: Left
- Played for: Ilves; HJK; HC Gherdëina; SG Cortina
- Playing career: 1964–1978

Timo Lahtinen (born 24 May 1947) is a retired Finnish ice hockey coach and former forward.

== Playing career ==
Lahtinen played in the SM-sarja for Ilves and HJK. He also played in Serie A for HC Gherdëina and SG Cortina.

== Coaching career ==
Lahtinen began his coaching career in 1976 as player-head coach of Tingsryds AIF of Division 1, the second-tier league in Sweden. He also coached Karlskrona IK and HV71 before becoming head coach of Södertälje SK in the Elitserien in 1983.

After two seasons with Södertälje, Lahtinen moved to Switzerland and coached EHC Arosa, SC Bern and Zürcher SC over the next four years. He returned to Sweden in 1989 and became head coach of Malmö IF where he coached for five seasons. He returned to Switzerland in 1994 to coach HC Lugano before returning to Sweden once more to coach AIK IF.

In 1998, Lahtinen moved to Germany's Deutsche Eishockey Liga and became head coach for the Kölner Haie. He was fired during the 1999-00 season and become head coach of Jokerit shortly afterwards, replacing Hannu Kapanen. He returned to Södertälje as a midseason replacement during 2002–03. He remained until the 2004–05 season where he was replaced by Mats Hallin. He then returned to another former team, Malmö, in 2006 as a senior advisor and board member. He returned to coaching in 2010, becoming head coach for Romanian team HSC Csíkszereda of the MOL Liga.
