= Jörg Mayr =

German ice hockey player

Personal information
- Nationality: German
- Born: 3 January 1970 (age 55); Füssen, West Germany

Sport
- Sport: Ice hockey

Jörg Mayr (born 3 January 1970) is a German former ice hockey player. He competed in the men's tournaments at the 1992 Winter Olympics, the 1994 Winter Olympics and the 2002 Winter Olympics.

== Career statistics ==
=== Regular season and playoffs ===
			Regular season					Playoffs
Season	Team	League	GP	G	A	Pts	PIM	GP	G	A	Pts	PIM
1987–88	EV Füssen	FRG.2	33	4	7	11	36	—	—	—	—	—
1988–89	EV Füssen	FRG.2	43	15	21	36	122	—	—	—	—	—
1989–90	Kölner EC	1.GBun	26	2	3	5	30	8	1	0	1	6
1990–91	Kölner EC	1.GBun	42	2	11	13	65	14	0	1	1	16
1991–92	Kölner EC	1.GBun	39	5	8	13	43	4	0	0	0	4
1992–93	Kölner EC	1.GBun	43	7	15	22	42	12	2	6	8	17
1993–94	Kölner EC	1.GBun	44	3	20	23	32	10	1	4	5	16
1994–95	Kölner Haie	DEL	42	3	18	21	54	18	3	12	15	32
1995–96	Kölner Haie	DEL	49	4	42	46	50	14	1	9	10	20
1996–97	Kölner Haie	DEL	35	5	10	15	36	4	0	1	1	12
1997–98	Kölner Haie	DEL	27	0	3	3	24	3	0	0	0	0
1998–99	Kölner Haie	DEL	30	1	5	6	12	5	0	1	1	8
1999–2000	Kölner Haie	DEL	44	1	2	3	16	8	0	0	0	0
2000–01	Kölner Haie	DEL	48	2	4	6	51	3	0	0	0	2
2001–02	Kölner Haie	DEL	50	0	5	5	38	—	—	—	—	—
1.GBun totals			194	19	57	76	212	48	4	11	15	59
DEL totals			325	16	89	105	281	55	4	23	27	74

=== International ===
Year	Team	Event	GP	G	A	Pts	PIM
1987	West Germany	EJC	7	0	1	1	6
1988	West Germany	WJC	7	1	1	2	6
1988	West Germany	EJC B	5	2	4	6	—
1989	West Germany	WJC	7	0	2	2	18
1990	West Germany	WJC B	4	3	1	4	8
1991	Germany	WC	7	0	0	0	6
1992	Germany	OLY	8	0	1	1	0
1992	Germany	WC	5	2	1	3	2
1993	Germany	WC	6	0	1	1	8
1994	Germany	OLY	8	1	1	2	2
1994	Germany	WC	5	0	0	0	2
1997	Germany	OGQ	3	0	0	0	2
1999	Germany	WC B	7	0	3	3	4
2000	Germany	OGQ	3	0	1	1	0
2001	Germany	OGQ	3	0	0	0	0
2001	Germany	WC	7	0	0	0	2
2002	Germany	OLY	1	0	0	0	0
Junior totals			30	6	9	15	38
Senior totals			63	3	8	11	28

"Jorg Mayr". Elite Prospects.
