= Kasperi Kapanen =

Finnish ice hockey player (born 1996)

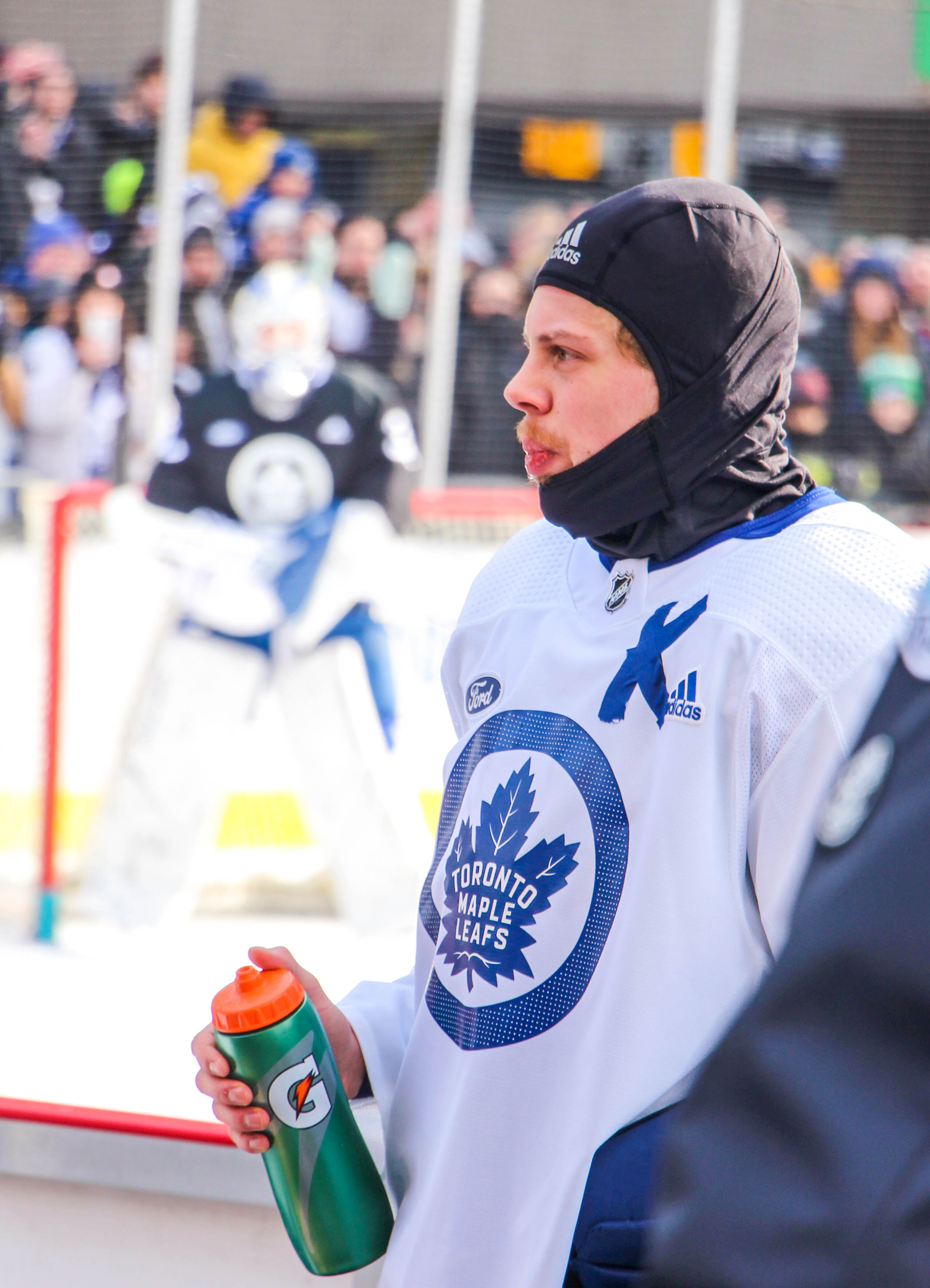
- Kapanen with the Toronto Maple Leafs in 2020
- Born: 23 July 1996 (age 30) Kuopio, Finland
- Height: 6 ft 1 in (185 cm)
- Weight: 197 lb (89 kg; 14 st 1 lb)
- Position: Right wing
- Shoots: Right
- NHL team Former teams: Edmonton Oilers; KalPa; Toronto Maple Leafs; Pittsburgh Penguins; St. Louis Blues
- National team: Finland
- NHL draft: 22nd overall, 2014; Pittsburgh Penguins
- Playing career: 2013–present

Samu Kasperi Kapanen (born 23 July 1996) is a Finnish professional ice hockey player who is a right winger for the Edmonton Oilers of the National Hockey League (NHL). He made his Liiga debut playing with KalPa during the 2012–13 SM-liiga season. Kapanen was selected by the Pittsburgh Penguins in the first round, 22nd overall, of the 2014 NHL entry draft.

== Playing career ==
=== Junior ===
Prior to the 2004–05 NHL lockout, Kapanen's father, Sami, was part of a group that purchased the latter's junior team in Finland, KalPa. Having owned the team since, it was no surprise when Kasperi Kapanen made his bantam debut with KalPa's under-16 affiliate in the Jr. C SM-Sarja. Kasperi Kapanen led the team in goals and was second in points, though failed to help them win their playoff qualifier. The following year, as a 15-year-old, Kasperi spent only eight games on the under-16 squad (scoring 16 points in the process) before graduating to the under-18 team playing in the Jr. B SM-Sarja. Kapanen continued his torrid scoring with 24 points in 25 games, finishing second in both goals (13) and points. His third season in Finland's junior system saw more of the same as he swiftly advanced to the under-20 team playing in the Jr. A SM-Liiga and recorded 29 points in 36 games, again leading the team in goals (14) and finishing fourth in points. During the 2012–13 season, he also spent 13 games with the senior KalPa team in the SM-Liiga, Finland's top professional league, playing alongside his father. At the end of the year, Kapanen was selected to play for the Finland under-18 national team at the 2013 IIHF World U18 Championships. Kapanen led Finland in goals and was second in points as he helped the team to a bronze medal finish.

Entering his draft year as one of the top European prospects, Kapanen spent most of the season with KalPa, scoring 7 goals in 47 games for a team that finished last in the league. He was expected to be an impact player for the Finland under-20 team at the 2014 World Junior Championship but was injured in the last practice before the tournament began and was unable to participate. The lost opportunity did not affect Kapanen's draft stock as he finished atop both the mid-season and final Central Scouting rankings amongst European-based skaters. With KalPa and its under-20 affiliate both eliminated from the respective playoffs, Kapanen was sent to the KalPa under-18 team for the end of their season and aided the Jr. B SM-Sarja team in its third-place league finish. Kapanen tied for the team lead in playoff goals with six despite playing in only four games. Kapanen found himself on Finland's under-18 team for a second consecutive year, but managed just two points in five games as Finland was eliminated in the quarter-final round following a heavy 10–0 loss to Sweden.

Despite being ranked as the 10th-, 13th- and 18th-best overall prospect by several NHL teams, Kapanen was ultimately selected 22nd overall by the Pittsburgh Penguins, the second-straight year Pittsburgh had selected a Finn in the first round of the NHL entry draft, after Olli Määttä in 2012. Jim Rutherford, the Penguins' general manager at the time, had also drafted Kasperi's father when he was general manager of the Hartford Whalers in 1995. On 11 July 2014, Kapanen signed a three-year, entry-level contract with the Penguins.

On 1 July 2015, Kapanen was traded to the Toronto Maple Leafs in a blockbuster, multi-player deal involving star forward Phil Kessel.

At the 2016 World Junior Ice Hockey Championship, Kapanen scored the game-winning goal in overtime against Russia to win the gold medal.

=== Professional ===
==== Toronto Maple Leafs ====
Kapanen began the 2015–16 season with the Maple Leafs' American Hockey League (AHL) affiliate, the Toronto Marlies. As the youngest player in the AHL, Kapanen played well in his role on a deep Marlies team that finished first in league standings. He made his NHL debut on 29 February 2016 against the Tampa Bay Lightning as part of a night where four players would make their debut, including William Nylander. Kapanen would play nine games for the struggling Maple Leafs, recording no points before being returned to the Marlies for the team's 2016 Calder Cup playoff run. Despite finishing as the top seed, the Marlies were eliminated in the Eastern Conference Finals by the Hershey Bears.

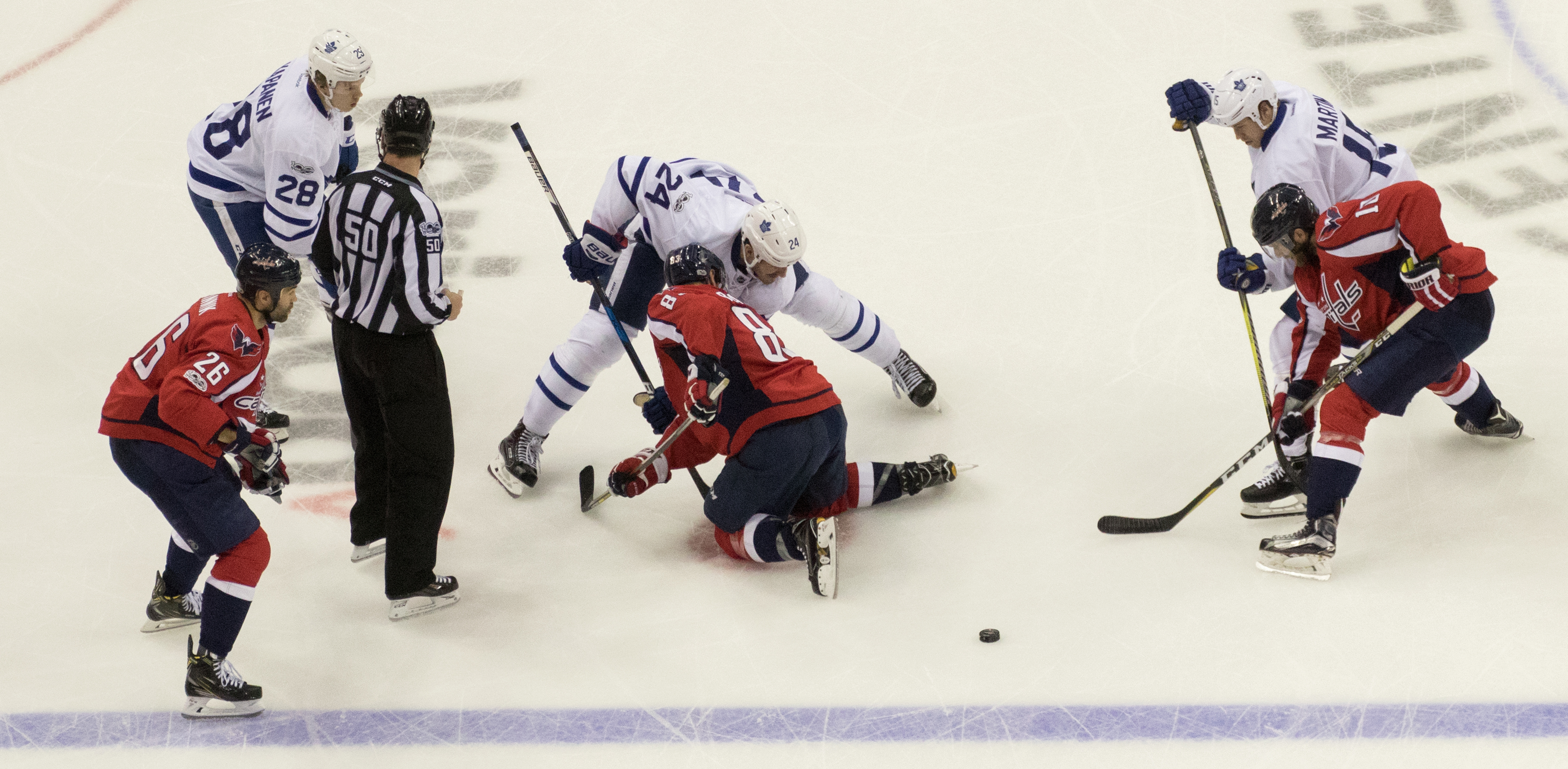
Kapanen (top-left) during a face-off against the Washington Capitals in the 2017 Stanley Cup playoffs

Kapanen returned to the Marlies the following season and quickly became one of their best players. Despite periods of injury, he scored at a pace of a point-a-game before an injury to Maple Leafs forward Nikita Soshnikov resulted in Kapanen being recalled to the Maple Leafs late in the season. Kapanen took a role on the fourth line alongside Brian Boyle and Matt Martin, playing well in limited minutes. He scored his first NHL goal on 8 April 2017 against the Penguins, the team that had drafted him. The goal was a vital one in a game that saw the team clinch a spot in the Stanley Cup playoffs for the first time since 2013, a remarkable feat considering the Maple Leafs finished last in the entire league the previous season. A week later, he scored with 8:07 left in double overtime in Game 2 of the Eastern Conference Quarterfinals as his Maple Leafs defeated the Washington Capitals 4–3 to tie the series at one game apiece. The Leafs ended up losing the series in six games.

Kapanen was sent down to the Marlies to begin the 2017–18 season, but was recalled on 28 October 2017 after playing six games for the Marlies. He was sent back down to the Marlies on 7 November, only to be recalled again on 12 December. He had been selected for the 2018 AHL All-Star Game, but was replaced by Andreas Johnsson. Kapanen recorded his first and only goal of the 2018 playoffs in Game 7 against the Boston Bruins, becoming the youngest player in NHL history to score a shorthanded goal in a Game 7. The Maple Leafs lost the series 3–4. Following the Maple Leafs' defeat, Kapanen joined the Finland senior national team at the 2018 IIHF World Championship.

After attending the Maple Leafs' training camp, Kapanen began the 2018–19 season NHL. As teammate William Nylander remained unsigned and in contract negotiations with Toronto, Kapanen replaced his spot on the team's top line. Kapanen finished the season with 20 goals and 44 points in 78 games.

On 28 June 2019, Kapanen signed a new three-year, $9.6 million contract with Toronto worth an annual average value of $3.2 million.

==== Pittsburgh Penguins ====
On 25 August 2020, the Maple Leafs traded Kapanen back to the Pittsburgh Penguins, along with Pontus Åberg and Jesper Lindgren, in exchange for Filip Hållander, David Warsofsky, and Pittsburgh's first-round pick in the 2020 NHL entry draft (Rodion Amirov).

As a restricted free agent following the 2021–22 season, Kapanen was signed to a two-year, $6.4 million contract extension with the Penguins on 21 July 2022.

==== St. Louis Blues ====
On 25 February 2023, Kapanen was claimed by the St. Louis Blues off waivers.

==== Edmonton Oilers ====
During the 2024–25 season, having registered just 1 goal in 10 appearances, Kapanen was placed on waivers by the Blues and claimed by the Edmonton Oilers on 19 November 2024.

On 14 May 2025, Kapanen scored the overtime goal to eliminate the Vegas Golden Knights in an 1–0 victory for the Oilers.

On 30 June 2025, Kapanen signed a one-year, $1.3 million contract extension.

Kapanen led the Oilers in goals and plus-minus during the 2026 playoffs. The Oilers would end up losing to the Anaheim Ducks in the first round of the playoffs, 4–2.

On 1 July 2026, Kapanen signed a one-year, $2.6 million contract with the Oilers.

== Personal life ==
Despite being born in and playing in the city of Kuopio, Finland, Kapanen considers himself a Philadelphia native, having spent much of his formative years in the city while his father was playing for the Philadelphia Flyers. Regardless, he describes himself as a "kid from Finland". Kapanen lived in Farmington, Connecticut, and Cary, North Carolina, prior to his father Sami's trade from the Hartford Whalers/Carolina Hurricanes franchise.

Kapanen spent parts of the 2012–13 and 2013–14 seasons playing with his father, for KalPa in the SM-liiga. He has three siblings: Cassandra born in 1999, Camila born in 2001, and Konsta born in 2003.

Kasperi is the grandson of former professional ice hockey player Hannu Kapanen, the great-nephew of Jari Kapanen, the nephew of Kimmo Kapanen, and the cousin of Oliver Kapanen. His brother Konsta Kapanen debuted in the 2023 World Junior Ice Hockey Championships.

In 2023 September, Finnish public broadcaster Yle reported Kapanen was suspected of aggravated drunk driving, with the case to be heard in district court in 2024 February. On 8 February 2024 the Finnish court sentenced Kapanen to a fine, amounting total of €108,700.

== Career statistics ==
=== Regular season and playoffs ===
| | | | Regular season | | | | | Playoffs |
| Season | Team | League | GP | G | A | Pts | PIM | GP | G | A | Pts | PIM |
|---|---|---|---|---|---|---|---|---|---|---|---|---|
| 2010–11 | KalPa | FIN U16 | 26 | 14 | 8 | 22 | 10 | — | — | — | — | — |
| 2011–12 | KalPa | FIN.2 U16 | 2 | 1 | 1 | 2 | 10 | 4 | 4 | 7 | 11 | 0 |
| 2011–12 | KalPa | FIN U18 | 25 | 13 | 11 | 24 | 6 | 2 | 0 | 0 | 0 | 0 |
| 2012–13 | KalPa | FIN U18 | 3 | 3 | 3 | 6 | 0 | — | — | — | — | — |
| 2012–13 | KalPa | FIN U20 | 36 | 14 | 15 | 29 | 16 | — | — | — | — | — |
| 2012–13 | KalPa | SM-l | 13 | 4 | 0 | 4 | 2 | 4 | 0 | 1 | 1 | 2 |
| 2013–14 | KalPa | FIN U18 | 2 | 5 | 1 | 6 | 0 | 4 | 6 | 1 | 7 | 2 |
| 2013–14 | KalPa | Liiga | 47 | 7 | 7 | 14 | 10 | — | — | — | — | — |
| 2014–15 | KalPa | Liiga | 41 | 11 | 10 | 21 | 14 | 6 | 0 | 3 | 3 | 2 |
| 2014–15 | Wilkes–Barre/Scranton Penguins | AHL | 4 | 1 | 1 | 2 | 0 | 7 | 3 | 2 | 5 | 0 |
| 2015–16 | Toronto Marlies | AHL | 44 | 9 | 16 | 25 | 8 | 14 | 3 | 5 | 8 | 2 |
| 2015–16 | Toronto Maple Leafs | NHL | 9 | 0 | 0 | 0 | 2 | — | — | — | — | — |
| 2016–17 | Toronto Marlies | AHL | 43 | 18 | 25 | 43 | 16 | 9 | 2 | 6 | 8 | 8 |
| 2016–17 | Toronto Maple Leafs | NHL | 8 | 1 | 0 | 1 | 0 | 6 | 2 | 0 | 2 | 0 |
| 2017–18 | Toronto Marlies | AHL | 28 | 12 | 12 | 24 | 12 | — | — | — | — | — |
| 2017–18 | Toronto Maple Leafs | NHL | 38 | 7 | 2 | 9 | 4 | 7 | 1 | 0 | 1 | 0 |
| 2018–19 | Toronto Maple Leafs | NHL | 78 | 20 | 24 | 44 | 27 | 7 | 1 | 1 | 2 | 2 |
| 2019–20 | Toronto Maple Leafs | NHL | 69 | 13 | 23 | 36 | 22 | 5 | 0 | 2 | 2 | 14 |
| 2020–21 | Pittsburgh Penguins | NHL | 40 | 11 | 19 | 30 | 7 | 6 | 1 | 2 | 3 | 0 |
| 2021–22 | Pittsburgh Penguins | NHL | 79 | 11 | 21 | 32 | 16 | 7 | 0 | 3 | 3 | 2 |
| 2022–23 | Pittsburgh Penguins | NHL | 43 | 7 | 13 | 20 | 8 | — | — | — | — | — |
| 2022–23 | St. Louis Blues | NHL | 23 | 8 | 6 | 14 | 10 | — | — | — | — | — |
| 2023–24 | St. Louis Blues | NHL | 73 | 6 | 16 | 22 | 14 | — | — | — | — | — |
| 2024–25 | St. Louis Blues | NHL | 10 | 1 | 0 | 1 | 2 | — | — | — | — | — |
| 2024–25 | Edmonton Oilers | NHL | 57 | 5 | 8 | 13 | 14 | 12 | 3 | 3 | 6 | 18 |
| 2025–26 | Edmonton Oilers | NHL | 41 | 8 | 9 | 17 | 14 | 6 | 4 | 2 | 6 | 0 |
| Liiga totals | | | 108 | 22 | 17 | 39 | 26 | 10 | 0 | 4 | 4 | 4 |
| NHL totals | | | 568 | 98 | 141 | 239 | 140 | 56 | 12 | 13 | 25 | 36 |

=== International ===
Medal record

Ice hockey

Representing Finland

World U18 Championship
| Bronze medal – third place | 2013 Sochi | |

World U20 Championship
| Gold medal – first place | 2016 Helsinki | |

Winter Youth Olympics
| Gold medal – first place | 2012 Innsbruck | |

| Year | Team | Event | Result | GP | G | A | Pts | PIM |
|---|---|---|---|---|---|---|---|---|
| 2013 | Finland | U17 | 7th | 5 | 3 | 6 | 9 | 4 |
| 2013 | Finland | WJC18 | 3rd place, bronze medalist(s) | 7 | 5 | 3 | 8 | 4 |
| 2014 | Finland | WJC18 | 6th | 5 | 1 | 1 | 2 | 0 |
| 2015 | Finland | WJC | 7th | 5 | 1 | 0 | 1 | 0 |
| 2016 | Finland | WJC | 1st place, gold medalist(s) | 7 | 2 | 3 | 5 | 2 |
| 2018 | Finland | WC | 5th | 8 | 3 | 0 | 3 | 0 |
| 2023 | Finland | WC | 7th | 8 | 3 | 2 | 5 | 2 |
| Junior totals | | | | 29 | 12 | 13 | 25 | 10 |
| Senior totals | | | | 16 | 6 | 2 | 8 | 2 |

Awards and achievements
| Preceded by Olli Määttä | Pittsburgh Penguins first-round draft pick 2014 | Succeeded by Samuel Poulin |
