= Juha Ylönen =

Finnish ice hockey player (born 1972)

- Born: February 13, 1972 (age 54) Helsinki, Finland
- Height: 6 ft 1 in (185 cm)
- Weight: 180 lb (82 kg; 12 st 12 lb)
- Position: Centre
- Shot: Left
- Played for: Phoenix Coyotes; Tampa Bay Lightning; Ottawa Senators
- National team: Finland
- NHL draft: 91st overall, 1991; Winnipeg Jets
- Playing career: 1991–2004

Juha Petteri Ylönen (born February 13, 1972) is a Finnish former professional ice hockey centre. He was selected by the Winnipeg Jets of the National Hockey League (NHL) in the fifth round, 91st overall, of the 1991 NHL entry draft. He played for the Phoenix Coyotes, Tampa Bay Lightning, and Ottawa Senators in the NHL. In international play, he won a bronze medal with Finland's national team at the 1998 Nagano Winter Olympics. His son, Jesse, is also an NHL player.

== Playing career ==
Ylönen played five seasons in Finland's SM-liiga before coming to North America to play. He joined the National Hockey League (NHL)'s Phoenix Coyotes (which Winnipeg had become after relocation) organization for the 1996–97 season, appearing in two games that season. he had the best production of his career that season for the American Hockey League (AHL) Springfield Falcons, scoring 61 points in 70 games and adding 21 points in the playoffs. He then played four full seasons with the Coyotes until he was traded prior to the 2001–02 season to the Tampa Bay Lightning in exchange for forward Todd Warriner. Ylönen played 65 games for the Lightning that season, but was dealt to the Ottawa Senators at the trade deadline in exchange for forward André Roy and a pick in the 2002 NHL entry draft.

After the 2001–02 season, Ylönen left the NHL and returned to Finland to play. In his NHL career, Ylönen appeared in 341 games. He scored 26 goals and added 76 assists. He also appeared in 15 Stanley Cup playoff games, recording seven assists. He played two seasons for the Espoo Blues, with the last being the 2003–04 season.

== International play ==
Olympic medal record

Men's Ice hockey
Bronze medal – third place	1998 Nagano	Ice hockey

Ylönen won a bronze medal as a member of the Finnish team at the 1998 Winter Olympics.

== Personal life ==
His son, Jesse, was selected in the second round, 35th overall, by the Montreal Canadiens in the 2018 NHL entry draft, and plays for the Tampa Bay Lightning.

== Career statistics ==
=== Regular season and playoffs ===
			Regular season					Playoffs
Season	Team	League	GP	G	A	Pts	PIM	GP	G	A	Pts	PIM
1988–89	Kiekko-Espoo	FIN U20	31	9	14	23	8	—	—	—	—	—
1989–90	Kiekko-Espoo	FIN U20	4	1	5	6	0	5	1	5	6	0
1989–90	Kiekko-Espoo	FIN.2	39	10	17	27	14	—	—	—	—	—
1991–92	HPK	FIN U20	2	1	2	3	0	—	—	—	—	—
1991–92	HPK	SM-l	43	7	11	18	8	—	—	—	—	—
1992–93	HPK	FIN U20	2	1	2	3	2	—	—	—	—	—
1992–93	HPK	SM-l	48	8	18	26	22	12	3	5	8	2
1993–94	Jokerit	SM-l	37	5	11	16	2	12	1	3	4	8
1994–95	Jokerit	SM-l	50	13	15	28	10	11	3	2	5	0
1995–96	Jokerit	SM-l	24	3	13	16	20	11	4	5	9	4
1996–97	Phoenix Coyotes	NHL	2	0	0	0	0	—	—	—	—	—
1996–97	Springfield Falcons	AHL	70	20	41	61	6	17	5	16	21	4
1997–98	Phoenix Coyotes	NHL	55	1	11	12	10	—	—	—	—	—
1998–99	Phoenix Coyotes	NHL	59	6	17	23	20	2	0	2	2	2
1999–00	Phoenix Coyotes	NHL	76	6	23	29	12	1	0	0	0	0
2000–01	Phoenix Coyotes	NHL	69	9	14	23	38	—	—	—	—	—
2001–02	Tampa Bay Lightning	NHL	63	3	10	13	8	—	—	—	—	—
2001–02	Ottawa Senators	NHL	15	1	1	2	2	12	0	5	5	2
2002–03	Espoo Blues	SM-l	54	4	19	23	59	4	1	1	2	27
2003–04	Espoo Blues	SM-l	21	2	8	10	2	9	1	3	4	0
SM-l totals			277	42	95	137	123	59	13	19	32	41
NHL totals			341	26	76	102	90	15	0	7	7	4

=== International ===
Year	Team	Event	GP	G	A	Pts	PIM
1990	Finland	EJC	6	3	4	7	0
1991	Finland	WJC	6	1	1	2	2
1992	Finland	WJC	7	1	5	6	0
1993	Finland	WC	1	0	0	0	0
1995	Finland	WC	8	1	3	4	2
1996	Finland	WC	6	0	2	2	4
1996	Finland	WCH	4	1	3	4	0
1998	Finland	OG	6	0	0	0	8
2001	Finland	WC	9	5	9	14	2
2002	Finland	OG	4	0	1	1	2
2003	Finland	WC	7	0	0	0	4
Junior totals			19	5	10	15	2
Senior totals			45	7	18	25	22
