= Oliver Kapanen =

Finnish ice hockey player (born 2003)

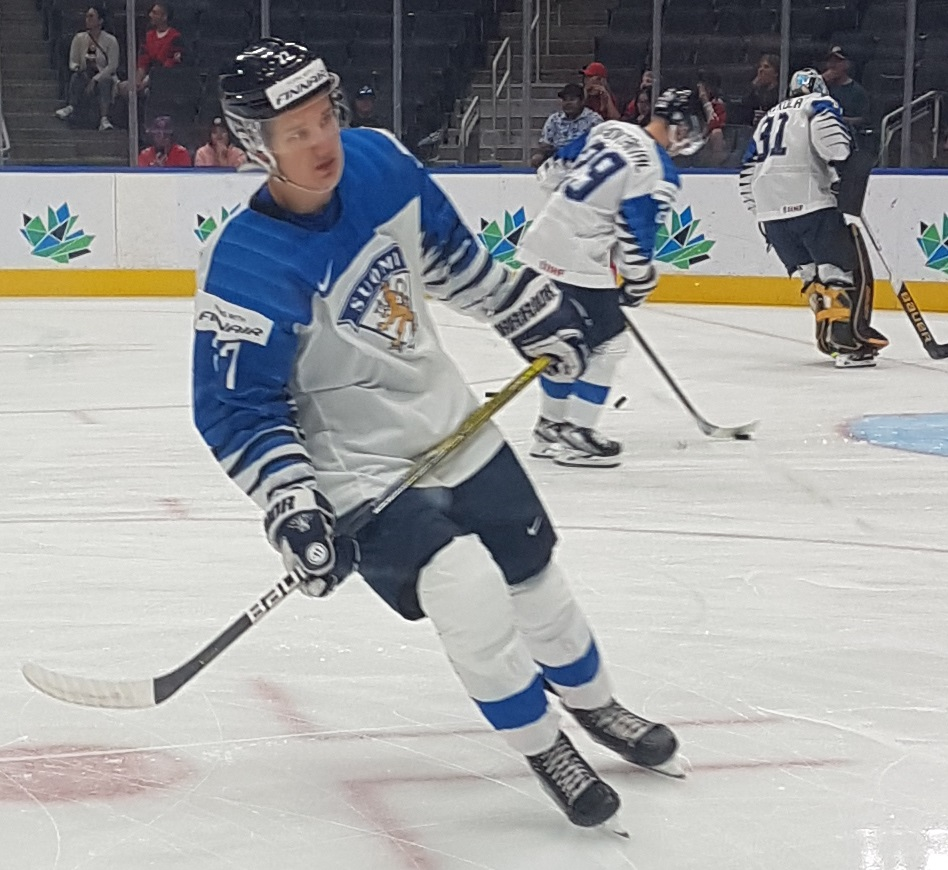
- Kapanen at the 2022 World Junior Ice Hockey Championships
- Born: 29 July 2003 (age 23) Timrå, Sweden
- Height: 188 cm (6 ft 2 in)
- Weight: 88 kg (194 lb; 13 st 12 lb)
- Position: Centre
- Shoots: Right
- NHL team Former teams: Montreal Canadiens; KalPa; Kärpät; Timrå IK
- National team: Finland
- NHL draft: 64th overall, 2021; Montreal Canadiens
- Playing career: 2021–present

Oliver Kapanen (born 29 July 2003) is a Finnish professional ice hockey player who is a centre for the Montreal Canadiens of the National Hockey League (NHL). He was selected in the second round, 64th overall, by the Canadiens in the 2021 NHL entry draft.

== Early life ==
Kapanen was born in Timrå, Sweden, on 29 July 2003 to Finnish parents while his father, ice hockey player Kimmo Kapanen, was playing there for Timrå IK. In 2005, the family moved to Finland when Kimmo signed with KalPa, which also became Oliver's youth team.

== Playing career ==
Kapanen was drafted in the second round, 64th overall, by the Montreal Canadiens of the National Hockey League (NHL) in the 2021 NHL entry draft. He made his professional debut for KalPa during the 2021–22 season.

Following three seasons with KalPa, Kapanen opted to continue his development in the neighbouring Swedish Hockey League (SHL), joining Timrå IK on a two-year contract on 9 May 2024.

On 15 June 2024, Kapanen signed a three-year, entry-level contract with the Canadiens. Thereafter, Kapanen was named to the Canadiens' opening night roster for the 2024–25 season. After being a healthy scratch for the first game of the season, he made his NHL debut on 10 October, replacing Emil Heineman on the team's fourth line. He recorded an assist on Josh Anderson's third period goal for his first career NHL point. Following 12 appearances with Montreal, Kapanen was loaned back to Timrå IK on 6 November 2024. Appearing in 36 regular season games with the foregoing, registering 15 goals and 20 assists for 35 points, he would rejoin the Canadiens on 2 April 2025. A month later, following his team's elimination from the 2025 Stanley Cup playoffs, Kapanen was assigned to their American Hockey League (AHL) affiliate, the Laval Rocket, for the duration of the Calder Cup playoffs. He scored his first AHL goal, the game-winner, in the opening contest of the North Division Final against the Rochester Americans on 14 May.

Kapanen earned a place on the Canadiens' roster for the 2025–26 season. He scored his first career NHL goal in the Canadiens' season opening matchup versus the Toronto Maple Leafs on 8 October. He became only the fifth player in franchise history whose first goal was a shorthanded one, and the first since Chris Chelios in 1984. Kapanen was used as the team's second line centre for much of the season, playing alongside fellow rookie Ivan Demidov. He appeared in all 82 games of the regular season, recording 22 goals and 15 assists. His usage declined sharply in the postseason, appearing in only seven games of the 2026 Stanley Cup playoffs, which saw the Canadiens make a deep run to the Eastern Conference Finals.

Absent from the opening weeks of the 2026–27 season due to a lower body injury, Kapanen made his season debut on 18 October against the Buffalo Sabres.

== International play ==
Medal record

Representing Finland

Men's ice hockey

Olympic Games
Bronze medal – third place	2026 Milano Cortina	

World Junior Championships
Silver medal – second place	2022 Canada	

Kapanen first represented his country as part of their national under-18 team at the 2021 IIHF World U18 Championships where he appeared in four games. He likewise represented the Finnish national junior team at the 2022 World Junior Ice Hockey Championships winning a silver medal, and again in 2023. That December, Kapanen, along with Liiga team KalPa, were selected to participate in the annual Spengler Cup tournament held in Davos, Switzerland. For his part, he registered one assist during the quarterfinal matchup with Team Canada which was ultimately won by the opposition.

In May 2024, Kapanen made his senior debut for the Finland national team at the IIHF World Championship in Prague, recording a team-leading six goals in tournament play.

In the midst of his successful 2025–26 season in the NHL, Kapanen was named to the Finnish team for the 2026 Winter Olympics in Milan. He was unused for most of the tournament, but following an injury to Mikko Rantanen in the semi-final, Kapanen took the ice for the third-place game against Slovakia. Finland prevailed by a score of 6–1, winning the bronze medal.

== Personal life ==
Kapanen comes from a hockey playing family. He is the grandson of former professional hockey player Hannu Kapanen and the son of Kimmo Kapanen. He is the great-nephew of Jari Kapanen, nephew of Sami Kapanen and cousin of Kasperi Kapanen and Konsta Kapanen.

== Career statistics ==
=== Regular season and playoffs ===
			Regular season					Playoffs
Season	Team	League	GP	G	A	Pts	PIM	GP	G	A	Pts	PIM
2019–20	KalPa	FIN U18	44	23	27	50	28	—	—	—	—	—
2019–20	KalPa	FIN U20	2	1	0	1	0	—	—	—	—	—
2020–21	KalPa	FIN U20	37	25	16	41	26	—	—	—	—	—
2020–21	Jokipojat	Mestis	5	3	2	5	12	—	—	—	—	—
2021–22	KalPa	FIN U20	11	7	8	15	0	10	5	6	11	14
2021–22	KalPa	Liiga	16	1	1	2	2	—	—	—	—	—
2021–22	IPK	Mestis	8	1	3	4	2	—	—	—	—	—
2021–22	Kärpät	Liiga	2	0	2	2	0	—	—	—	—	—
2022–23	KalPa	Liiga	55	12	15	27	28	7	0	1	1	6
2023–24	KalPa	Liiga	51	14	20	34	32	13	7	7	14	6
2024–25	Montreal Canadiens	NHL	18	0	2	2	2	3	0	1	1	0
2024–25	Timrå IK	SHL	36	15	20	35	12	6	2	1	3	6
2024–25	Laval Rocket	AHL	—	—	—	—	—	11	3	3	6	2
2025–26	Montreal Canadiens	NHL	82	22	15	37	22	7	0	0	0	2
NHL totals			100	22	17	39	24	10	0	1	1	2

=== International ===
Year	Team	Event	Result	GP	G	A	Pts	PIM
2021	Finland	WJC18	4th	4	0	0	0	2
2022	Finland	WJC	2nd place, silver medalist(s)	7	1	1	2	4
2023	Finland	WJC	5th	5	2	1	3	0
2023	KalPa	SC	6th	3	0	1	1	4
2024	Finland	WC	8th	8	6	0	6	4
2026	Finland	OG	3rd place, bronze medalist(s)	3	0	0	0	0
Junior totals				16	3	2	5	6
Senior totals				11	6	0	6	4
