= Sakari Pietilä =

Finnish ice hockey player and coach

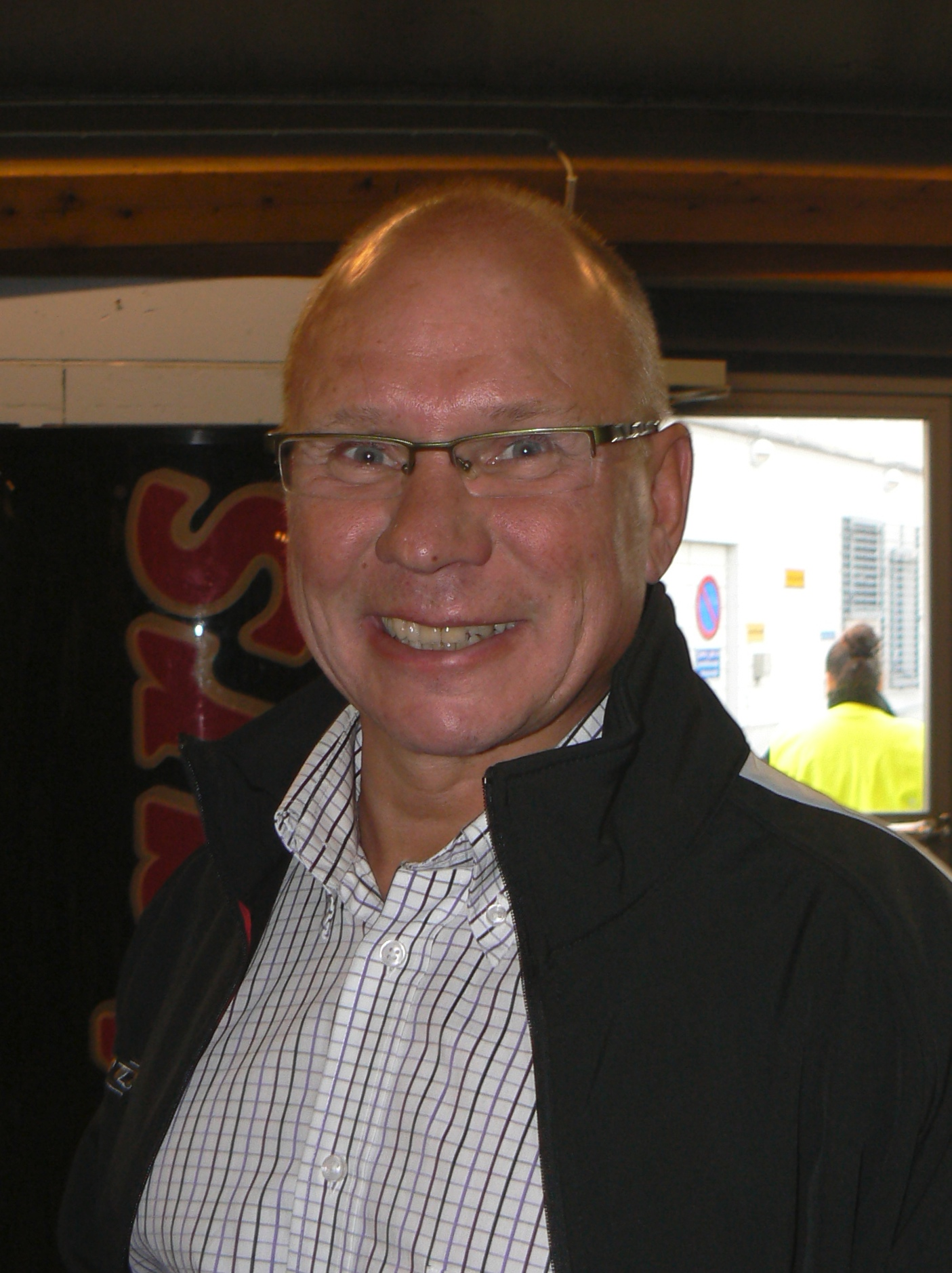
- Born: 21 June 1954 (age 71) Oulu, Finland
- Position: Centre
- Played for: IF Vallentuna BK
- NHL draft: Undrafted
- Playing career: 1972–1981

Sakari Pietilä (born 21 June 1954) is a Finnish former professional ice hockey player.

Pietilä was an SM-liiga head coach with HPK for the 1995–96 SM-liiga season and Jokerit for the 1997–98 SM-liiga season. He was the head coach of the Estonia men's national ice hockey team from 2013 until he was replaced by Ismo Lehkonen on January 23, 2015.
