= Kimmo Kapanen =

Finnish ice hockey player

- Born: September 12, 1974 (age 52) Vantaa, FIN
- Height: 6 ft 0 in (183 cm)
- Weight: 172 lb (78 kg; 12 st 4 lb)
- Position: Goaltender
- Caught: Left
- Played for: SM-liiga; KalPa; HIFK; Blues; HPK; Ässät; Elitserien; Timrå IK; HV71; DEL; Iserlohn Roosters
- Playing career: 1992–2008

Kimmo Kapanen (born September 12, 1974) is a retired Finnish professional ice hockey goaltender. He is currently working as the sporting director of Oulun Kärpät.

Kapanen played for several Finnish teams during his career including Ässät, HPK and KalPa. Kapanen also played in Sweden for Timrå IK and in Germany for Iserlohn Roosters. As of the 2026–27 season, Kapanen's son, Oliver Kapanen (Montreal Canadiens), and nephew, Kasperi Kapanen (Edmonton Oilers), are both playing in the National Hockey League.

== Playing career ==
Kapanen started his career in 1992 playing for KalPa in SM-liiga. He played in Finland until 2001 when he moved to Timrå IK in the Swedish elite league Elitserien. He stayed with Timrå for three seasons and had his best season in 2003-04 when he was recorded for eight shutouts and 2.21 GAA.

From 2005 he returned to KalPa and played with them for two seasons. He only played 69 matches there due to several injuries.

On January 22, 2007, Kapanen was loaned to HV71 in Elitserien for the remainder of the season 2006-07. With only three games played for his new club, he injured his foot during a training session in the beginning of March, and was out for the entire 2006-07 playoffs.

After his loan, Kapanen was contracted to Ässät and played the 2007-08 season in Pori.

In 2008, Kapanen announced his retirement from playing due to injuries. He began working with SM-liiga club KalPa after his retirement, and worked with the club until 2017. Following his resignation from KalPa, he joined Acme World Sports as a player agent in May 2017.

Kapanen joined the SHL club Timrå IK as a sporting director in 2022. Kapanen worked with Timrå for three seasons, before leaving for family reasons in 2025. Following his exit from Timrå, he was appointed as the sporting director of Oulun Kärpät.

== Personal life ==
Kapanen is the younger brother of Sami Kapanen who retired from the NHL in 2008. His son Oliver plays in the NHL for the Montreal Canadiens. His father Hannu Kapanen, uncle Jari Kapanen and nephews Kasperi Kapanen and Konsta Kapanen also all played hockey at a high level.
