= Artūrs Kupaks =

Latvian ice hockey player

- Born: 14 July 1973 (age 52); Riga, Latvian SSR, USSR
- Height: 6 ft 0 in (183 cm)
- Weight: 187 lb (85 kg; 13 st 5 lb)
- Position: Defense
- Shot: Left
- Played for: RASMS Riga; Stars Riga; Greensboro Monarchs; Houston Aeros; Las Vegas Thunder; Detroit Falcons; Toledo Storm; Springfield Falcons; Chesapeake Icebreakers; Lubbock Cotton Kings; Idaho Steelheads; Phoenix Mustangs; New Mexico Scorpions; Austin Ice Bats; Tulsa Oilers
- National team: Latvia
- NHL draft: Undrafted
- Playing career: 1990–2006

Artūrs Kupaks (born 14 July 1973) is a Latvian former professional ice hockey defenceman.

Kupaks started playing in the Soviet League and the International Hockey League for RASMS Riga and Stars Riga, then went on to play eleven additional seasons in the minor leagues of North America for 13 different teams before retiring as a professional player following the 2005–06 season.

== Career statistics ==
			Regular season					Playoffs
Season	Team	League	GP	G	A	Pts	PIM	GP	G	A	Pts	PIM
1990–91	RASMS Riga	Soviet3	4	0	0	0	4	—	—	—	—	—
1991–92	Stars Riga	Soviet	9	0	0	0	2	—	—	—	—	—
1991–92	RASMS Riga	Soviet3	22	7	5	12	34	—	—	—	—	—
1992–93	Pardaugava Riga	Russia	41	4	3	7	42	2	1	0	1	0
1992–93	Pardaugava Riga	Latvia	5	0	0	0	36	—	—	—	—	—
1993–94	Pardaugava Riga	Russia	40	0	5	5	28	—	—	—	—	—
1994–95	Greensboro Monarchs	ECHL	63	14	30	44	89	18	5	10	15	24
1995–96	Houston Aeros	IHL	2	0	0	0	2	—	—	—	—	—
1995–96	Las Vegas Thunder	IHL	3	0	0	0	2	—	—	—	—	—
1995–96	Detroit Falcons	CoHL	67	18	39	57	94	8	0	5	5	20
1996–97	Las Vegas Thunder	IHL	6	0	0	0	10	—	—	—	—	—
1996–97	Toledo Storm	ECHL	52	13	30	43	112	—	—	—	—	—
1997–98	Springfield Falcons	AHL	7	0	1	1	12	—	—	—	—	—
1997–98	Chesapeake Icebreakers	ECHL	51	17	36	53	72	3	1	3	4	6
1998–99	Chesapeake Icebreakers	ECHL	48	16	32	48	61	8	2	2	4	15
1999–00	Lubbock Cotton Kings	WPHL	66	16	70	86	113	7	2	4	6	10
2000–01	Idaho Steelheads	WCHL	32	5	20	25	39	—	—	—	—	—
2000–01	Phoenix Mustangs	WCHL	19	6	8	14	22	—	—	—	—	—
2001–02	New Mexico Scorpions	CHL	47	9	23	32	56	—	—	—	—	—
2002–03	New Mexico Scorpions	CHL	62	15	41	56	103	4	1	1	2	8
2003–04	New Mexico Scorpions	CHL	42	5	19	24	78	—	—	—	—	—
2003–04	Austin Ice Bats	CHL	23	5	8	13	18	—	—	—	—	—
2004–05	Austin Ice Bats	CHL	21	7	8	15	18	—	—	—	—	—
2005–06	Tulsa Oilers	CHL	13	2	3	5	37	—	—	—	—	—
ECHL totals			214	60	128	188	334	29	8	15	23	45
CHL totals			208	43	102	145	310	4	1	1	2	8
