= David Moravec =

- Born: March 24, 1973 (age 53) Opava, Czechoslovakia
- Height: 6 ft 0 in (183 cm)
- Weight: 200 lb (91 kg; 14 st 4 lb)
- Position: Left wing
- Shot: Left
- Played for: HC Vítkovice; Buffalo Sabres; Lokomotiv Yaroslavl; HC Lasselsberger Plzeň; Malmö Redhawks; HPK; Grizzlys Wolfsburg; HC Oceláři Třinec; MHk 32 Liptovský Mikuláš; HK Nitra
- National team: Czech Republic
- NHL draft: 218th overall, 1998; Buffalo Sabres
- Playing career: 1994–2013

David Moravec (born March 24, 1973, in Opava, Czechoslovakia) is a former professional ice hockey left wing who played for HC Oceláři Třinec of the Czech Extraliga and now works as a hockey coach.

He was drafted in the eighth round, 218th overall, by the Buffalo Sabres in the 1998 NHL entry draft. He played one game in the National Hockey League with the Sabres in the 1999–2000 season, going scoreless against the Detroit Red Wings.

Moravec was a member of the Czech team which won the gold medal at the 1998 Winter Olympics.

== Career statistics ==
=== Regular season and playoffs ===
			Regular season					Playoffs
Season	Team	League	GP	G	A	Pts	PIM	GP	G	A	Pts	PIM
1992–93	HC Slezan Opava	TCH.2	—	—	—	—	—	—	—	—	—	—
1993–94	HC Slezan Opava	CZE.2	—	—	—	—	—	—	—	—	—	—
1994–95	HC Vítkovice	ELH	38	4	13	17	12	—	—	—	—	—
1995–96	HC Vítkovice	ELH	37	6	5	11	14	4	0	0	0	4
1996–97	HC Vítkovice	ELH	52	18	21	39	30	9	6	3	9	0
1997–98	HC Vítkovice	ELH	50	38	24	62	26	11	5	9	14	8
1998–99	HC Vítkovice	ELH	49	20	21	41	42	4	1	1	2	0
1999–2000	Buffalo Sabres	NHL	1	0	0	0	0	—	—	—	—	—
1999–2000	HC Vítkovice	ELH	38	11	18	29	34	—	—	—	—	—
2000–01	HC Vítkovice	ELH	51	15	20	35	34	10	4	6	10	4
2001–02	HC Vítkovice	ELH	46	18	26	44	32	14	7	7	14	2
2002–03	HC Vítkovice	ELH	52	18	35	53	50	6	2	1	3	4
2003–04	Lokomotiv Yaroslavl	RSL	59	7	21	28	32	3	0	1	1	0
2004–05	HC Vítkovice	ELH	26	7	9	16	18	—	—	—	—	—
2004–05	HC Lasselsberger Plzeň	ELH	24	6	13	19	12	—	—	—	—	—
2005–06	HC Lasselsberger Plzeň	ELH	34	9	18	27	30	—	—	—	—	—
2005–06	Malmö Redhawks	Allsv	10	5	5	10	6	9	2	6	8	8
2006–07	Malmö Redhawks	SEL	30	1	8	9	22	—	—	—	—	—
2006–07	HPK	SM-liiga	22	7	10	17	2	8	1	5	6	6
2007–08	Grizzlys Wolfsburg	DEL	24	1	6	7	22	—	—	—	—	—
2007–08	HC Oceláři Třinec	ELH	26	4	5	9	34	8	2	1	3	12
2008–09	HC Oceláři Třinec	ELH	52	9	15	24	62	5	0	1	1	2
2009–10	HC Havířov Panthers	CZE.2	15	3	9	12	6	—	—	—	—	—
2009–10	Hokej Šumperk 2003	CZE.2	7	2	5	7	8	—	—	—	—	—
2009–10	MHk 32 Liptovský Mikuláš	SVK	11	2	13	15	8	—	—	—	—	—
2010–11	HK Nitra	SVK	11	0	3	3	4	—	—	—	—	—
2010–11	HC Plus Oil Orlová	CZE.3	26	12	19	31	36	9	3	5	8	4
2011–12	SK Karviná	CZE.3	40	23	34	57	38	11	4	5	9	16
2012–13	SK Karviná	CZE.3	34	9	18	27	40	8	3	3	6	34
ELH totals			575	183	243	426	430	71	27	29	56	36

=== International ===
Year	Team	Event	GP	G	A	Pts	PIM
1997	Czech Republic	WC	9	0	1	1	4
1998	Czech Republic	OG	6	0	1	1	2
1998	Czech Republic	WC	8	1	2	3	14
1999	Czech Republic	WC	10	0	0	0	8
2001	Czech Republic	WC	9	3	4	7	6
2002	Czech Republic	WC	7	1	2	3	2
Senior totals			49	5	10	15	36

== See also ==
- List of players who played only one game in the NHL
