= Yuri Kuznetsov (ice hockey, born 1971) =

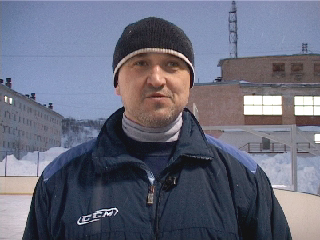
- Kuznetsov in 2017
- Born: August 10, 1971 (age 54) Novosibirsk, USSR
- Height: 6 ft 2 in (188 cm)
- Weight: 209 lb (95 kg; 14 st 13 lb)
- Position: Left wing and Center
- Shot: Left
- Played for: RSL Metallurg Magnitogorsk; Severstal Cherepovets; Avangard Omsk; Sibir Novosibirsk; CSKA Moscow; Molot-Prikamie Perm; AHL Syracuse Crunch
- National team: Russia
- NHL draft: 169th overall, 1994; Vancouver Canucks
- Playing career: 1992–2009

Yuri Vladimirovich Kuznetsov (Russian: Юрий Владимирович Кузнецов; born August 10, 1971, in Novosibirsk, Russia) is a Russian ice hockey coach and former player.

== Career Notes ==
Yuri Kuznetsov reached the highlight of his career in 2001 when he won the Russian Superleague with Metallurg Magnitogorsk, playing on a line with brothers Aleksandr and Yevgeniy Koreshkov from Kazakhstan. This same year he played for the Russian national team in the 2001 IIHF World Championship.

After two successful seasons with Severstal Cherepovets, he was reunited with the Koreshkov brothers in 2004–2005 at his youth club, the Sibir Novosibirsk but all three players left the club during the season without much success.

His career outside of Russia included 2 seasons for the Syracuse Crunch of the AHL right after he was selected by the Vancouver Canucks in the 7th round of 1994 NHL entry draft. He also played for the Minnesota Moose of the IHL, the Kölner Haie of the DEL and the Milano Vipers of the French League.

== Coaching career ==
In May 2009 PHC Krylya Sovetov announced that Yuri Kuznetsov would be assistant coach to Alexei Kasatonov, the new head coach for the 2009–2010 Vysshaya Liga season, with Vladimir Myshkin being the goaltender coach.

== Career statistics ==
| | | | Regular Season | | | | | Playoffs |
| Season | Team | League | GP | G | A | Pts | PIM | GP | G | A | Pts | PIM |
|---|---|---|---|---|---|---|---|---|---|---|---|---|
| 88/89 | Sibir Novosibirsk | Vys. | 48 | 5 | 1 | 6 | 14 |
| 89/90 | Sibir Novosibirsk | Vys. | 47 | 4 | 4 | 8 | 10 |
| 90/91 | Sibir Novosibirsk | Vys. | 62 | 6 | 3 | 9 | 26 |
| 91/92 | Sibir Novosibirsk | Vys. | 72 | 30 | 25 | 55 | 24 |
| 92/93 | Avangard Omsk | RSL | 32 | 9 | 9 | 18 | 4 | 4 | 1 | 0 | 1 | 2 |
| 93/94 | Avangard Omsk | RSL | 35 | 17 | 10 | 27 | 16 |
| 94/95 | Syracuse Crunch | AHL | 54 | 10 | 17 | 27 | 37 |
| 95/96 | Syracuse Crunch | AHL | 28 | 7 | 7 | 14 | 20 |
| 95/96 | Minnesota Moose | IHL | 5 | 0 | 0 | 0 | 4 |
| 96/97 | HC CSKA Moscow | EHL | 6 | 2 | 1 | 3 | 2 |
| 96/97 | HC CSKA Moscow | RSL | 43 | 12 | 14 | 26 | 36 | 2 | 2 | 2 | 4 | 0 |
| 97/98 | Avangard Omsk | RSL | 42 | 18 | 3 | 21 | 20 |
| 98/99 | Kölner Haie | DEL | 3 | 0 | 0 | 0 | 0 |
| 99/00 | Milano Vipers | France | 25 | 23 | 18 | 41 | 12 |
| 99/00 | HC Sierre-Anniviers | NL B |
| 00/01 | Metallurg Magnitogorsk | RSL | 41 | 15 | 11 | 26 | 22 | 12 | 8 | 4 | 12 | 4 |
| 01/02 | Metallurg Magnitogorsk | RSL | 48 | 12 | 11 | 23 | 24 | 9 | 0 | 2 | 2 | 4 |
| 02/03 | Severstal Cherepovets | RSL | 38 | 11 | 11 | 22 | 30 | 10 | 1 | 3 | 4 | 2 |
| 03/04 | Severstal Cherepovets | RSL | 51 | 8 | 17 | 25 | 12 |
| 04/05 | Sibir Novosibirsk | RSL | 14 | 0 | 3 | 3 | 2 |
| 04/05 | Torpedo Nizhny-Novgorod | Vys. | 30 | 5 | 13 | 18 | 14 | 2 | 0 | 0 | 0 | 2 |
| 05/06 | Molot-Prikamie Perm | RSL | 45 | 8 | 6 | 14 | 52 |
| 06/07 | Metallurg-2 Novokuznetsk | RUS-3 |
| 06/07 | Metallurg Novokuznetsk | RSL | 8 | 0 | 1 | 1 | 4 |
| 06/07 | HK Dmitrov | Vys. | 31 | 12 | 12 | 24 | 46 | 14 | 3 | 2 | 5 | 18 |
| 07/08 | HK Dmitrov | Vys. | 46 | 17 | 19 | 36 | 87 | 6 | 0 | 2 | 2 | 4 |
| 08/09 | Krylia Sovetov | Vys. | 1 | 1 | 0 | 1 | 2 |
| Totals | | | 862 | 233 | 218 | 451 | 522 | 59 | 15 | 15 | 30 | 36 |
| Russian Superleague | | | 397 | 110 | 96 | 206 | 222 | 37 | 12 | 11 | 23 | 12 |
| AHL | | | 82 | 17 | 24 | 41 | 57 |

== International play ==
Played for Russia in:

- 2001 IIHF World Championship (finished 6th)

=== International statistics ===
| Year | Team | Comp | GP | G | A | Pts | PIM |
|---|---|---|---|---|---|---|---|
| 2001 | Russia | WC | 7 | 1 | 2 | 3 | 2 |
