= Sami Kapanen =

Finnish ice hockey player (born 1973)

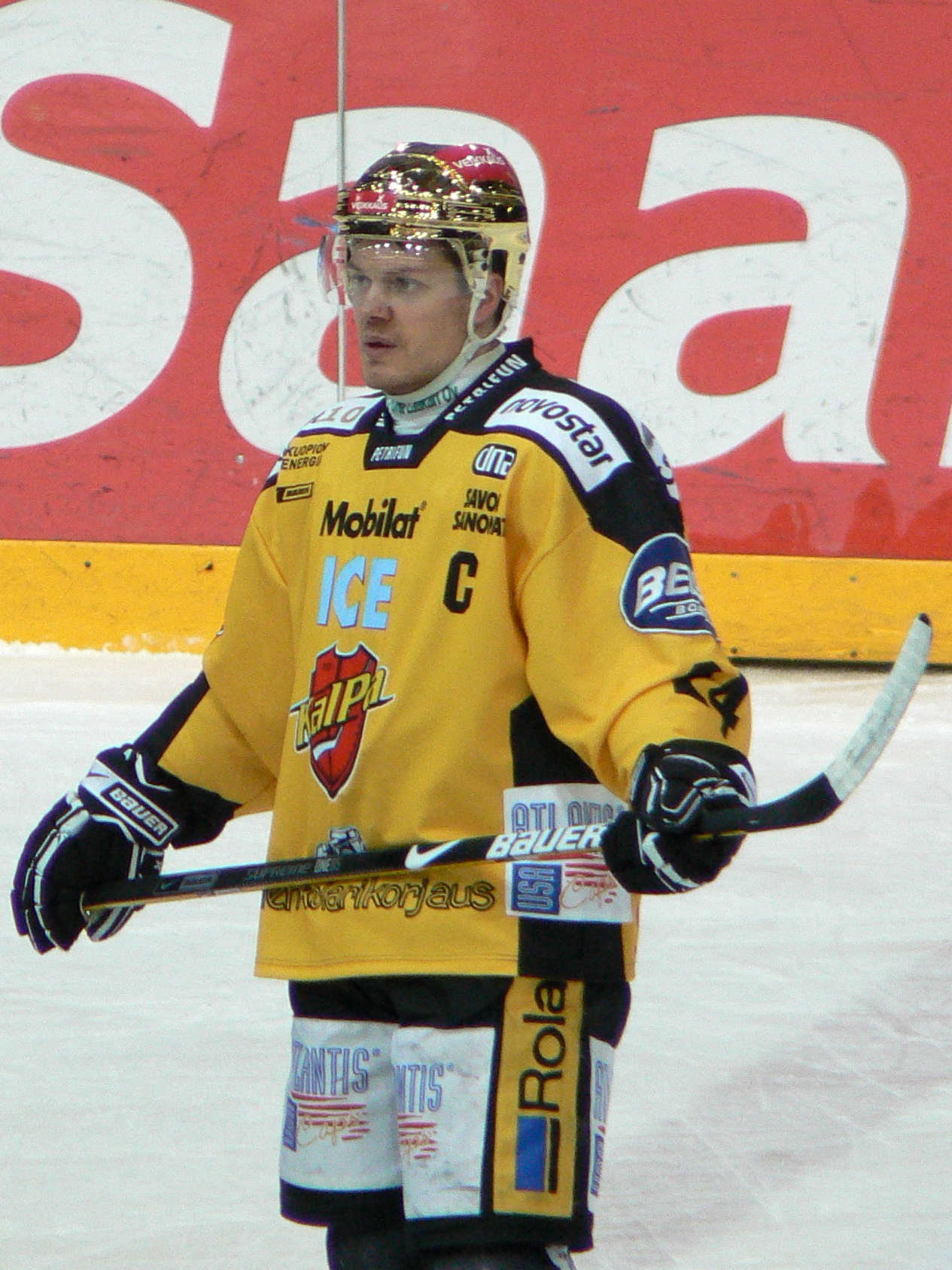
- Kapanen with KalPa in 2009
- Born: 14 June 1973 (age 53) Vantaa, Finland
- Height: 5 ft 9 in (175 cm)
- Weight: 181 lb (82 kg; 12 st 13 lb)
- Position: Right wing
- Shot: Left
- Played for: KalPa; HIFK; Hartford Whalers; Carolina Hurricanes; Philadelphia Flyers
- National team: Finland
- NHL draft: 87th overall, 1995; Hartford Whalers
- Playing career: 1990–2010; 2011–2014

Medal record

Representing Finland

Ice hockey

Winter Olympics
Bronze medal – third place	1994 Lillehammer	
Bronze medal – third place	1998 Nagano	

World Championships
Gold medal – first place	1995 Stockholm	
Silver medal – second place	1994 Milan	
Silver medal – second place	1998 Zürich	
Silver medal – second place	2001 Nuremberg	

Sami Hannu Antero Kapanen (born 14 June 1973) is a Finnish professional ice hockey coach and former player. He played 12 National Hockey League (NHL) seasons for the Hartford Whalers, Carolina Hurricanes and Philadelphia Flyers. He is the majority owner of KalPa in the Finnish league. As of the 2026–27 season, Kapanen's son, Kasperi Kapanen (Edmonton Oilers), and nephew, Oliver Kapanen (Montreal Canadiens), are both playing in the NHL.

== Playing career ==
Kapanen was drafted 87th overall in the 1995 NHL entry draft by the Hartford Whalers. His first NHL season was in 1995–96, when he played 35 games with Hartford. The Whalers relocated to become the Carolina Hurricanes following the 1996–97 season and Kapanen averaged 24 goals and 35 assists in his next five seasons with Carolina. His best season was in 2001–02 when he scored 27 goals and 42 assists for 69 points. He was selected twice for the NHL All Star Game (2000, 2002), winning the Individual event for "the Fastest skater" on both occasions.

On 7 February 2003, Kapanen was traded to the Philadelphia Flyers along with Ryan Bast for Pavel Brendl and Bruno St. Jacques. In his first two seasons with Philadelphia, Kapanen played 31 playoff games, scoring 17 points.

Kapanen has played three times for Finland at the Winter Olympics. In 18 Olympic games he scored 2 goals and 3 assists for 5 points. In the NHL, Kapanen has played 831 regular season games, scoring 189 goals and 269 assists for 458 points. He has also played in 87 playoff games, scoring 13 goals and 22 assists for 35 points. Kapanen also won a gold medal at the 1995 Ice Hockey World Championships.

Since 2003, Kapanen has also been the majority owner of the Finnish hockey team KalPa Kuopio, the same club that gave him his start as a professional. One of the minority owners is Kimmo Timonen who in 2007 became Kapanen's teammate on the Flyers. Following the 2007–08 season, Kapanen announced that he was retiring from the NHL and he would be returning to Finland to play for KalPa. He retired as a player after the 2009–10 season.

On 7 April 2011, Kapanen announced that he would be doing a comeback as a player in KalPa, playing on a two-year contract. He, however, stepped down as the club's chief executive officer (CEO) and instead handed that role over to his brother Kimmo Kapanen.

== Coaching career ==
Kapanen started his coaching career in the Finnish Liiga with KalPa (2017–2019). On 2 April 2019, Kapanen was named head coach of HC Lugano in the National League for the 2019/20 and 2020/21 season, but was dismissed on 18 December 2019.

== Awards ==
- Bronze Medal at the Winter Olympics in 1994.
- Named to the SM-liiga First All-Star Team in 1994.
- Gold Medal at the World Championships 1995.
- Bronze Medal at the Winter Olympics in 1998.
- Played in the NHL All-Star Game in 2000.
- Named Best Forward at World Championships 2001.
- Played in the NHL All-Star Game in 2002.
- Awarded the Yanick Dupre Memorial in 2004.
- Awarded the Gene Hart Memorial Award in 2007.

== Records ==
- Tied a record for scoring two consecutive overtime goals in two consecutive games. (Subsequently, broken by Andrew Cogliano)
- Two-time NHL All Star game individual event Fastest Skater winner (2000, 2002) completing a lap around an NHL rink in 13.649 resp. 14.039 seconds.
- Fastest Man on ice awarded when he completed a lap around an NHL rink in 12.7 seconds.

== Career statistics ==
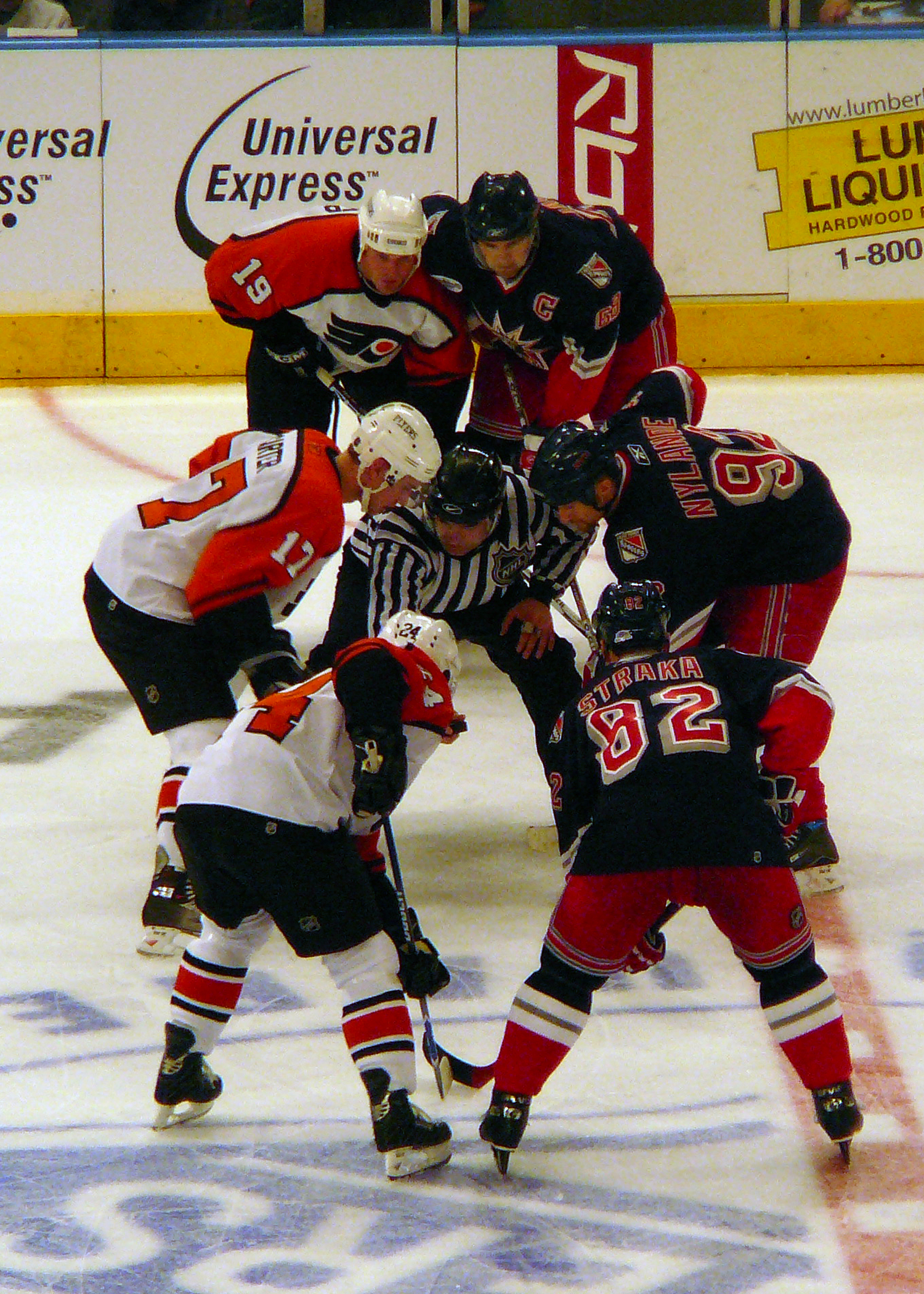
Kapanen (bottom left) playing for the Flyers against the New York Rangers in 2007.

=== Regular season and playoffs ===
			Regular season					Playoffs
Season	Team	League	GP	G	A	Pts	PIM	GP	G	A	Pts	PIM
1989–90	KalPa	FIN U20	30	14	13	27	4	—	—	—	—	—
1990–91	KalPa	FIN U20	31	9	27	36	10	—	—	—	—	—
1990–91	KalPa	SM-l	14	1	2	3	2	8	2	1	3	2
1991–92	KalPa	FIN U20	8	1	3	4	12	—	—	—	—	—
1991–92	KalPa	SM-l	42	15	10	25	8	—	—	—	—	—
1992–93	KalPa	FIN.2 U20	1	0	2	2	0	7	11	14	25	2
1992–93	KalPa	SM-l	37	4	17	21	12	—	—	—	—	—
1993–94	KalPa	SM-l	48	23	32	55	16	—	—	—	—	—
1993–94	HC Královopolská Brno	CZE.2	—	—	—	—	—	1	0	0	0	0
1994–95	HIFK	SM-l	49	14	28	42	42	3	0	0	0	0
1995–96	Hartford Whalers	NHL	35	5	4	9	6	—	—	—	—	—
1995–96	Springfield Falcons	AHL	28	14	17	31	4	3	1	2	3	0
1996–97	Hartford Whalers	NHL	45	13	12	25	2	—	—	—	—	—
1997–98	Carolina Hurricanes	NHL	81	26	37	63	16	—	—	—	—	—
1998–99	Carolina Hurricanes	NHL	81	24	35	59	10	5	1	1	2	0
1999–2000	Carolina Hurricanes	NHL	76	24	24	48	12	—	—	—	—	—
2000–01	Carolina Hurricanes	NHL	82	20	37	57	24	6	2	3	5	0
2001–02	Carolina Hurricanes	NHL	77	27	42	69	23	23	1	8	9	6
2002–03	Carolina Hurricanes	NHL	43	6	12	18	12	—	—	—	—	—
2002–03	Philadelphia Flyers	NHL	28	4	9	13	6	13	4	3	7	6
2003–04	Philadelphia Flyers	NHL	74	12	18	30	14	18	3	7	10	6
2004–05	KalPa	Mestis	10	6	3	9	2	9	5	3	8	4
2005–06	Philadelphia Flyers	NHL	58	12	22	34	12	6	0	0	0	2
2006–07	Philadelphia Flyers	NHL	77	11	14	25	22	—	—	—	—	—
2007–08	Philadelphia Flyers	NHL	74	5	3	8	16	16	2	0	2	2
2008–09	KalPa	SM-l	55	20	24	44	18	12	4	5	9	4
2009–10	KalPa	SM-l	49	15	31	46	58	13	6	7	13	0
2011–12	KalPa	SM-l	35	13	12	25	33	2	1	0	1	0
2012–13	KalPa	SM-l	38	7	11	18	14	5	0	1	1	2
2013–14	KalPa	Liiga	34	7	6	13	26	—	—	—	—	—
NHL totals			831	189	269	458	175	87	13	22	35	22
SM-l/Liiga totals			401	120	173	293	229	43	13	14	27	8

=== International ===
Year	Team	Event	GP	G	A	Pts	PIM
1991	Finland	EJC	6	6	4	10	0
1992	Finland	WJC	7	1	5	6	8
1993	Finland	WJC	7	1	2	3	2
1994	Finland	OLY	8	1	0	1	2
1994	Finland	WC	8	4	2	6	0
1995	Finland	WC	8	2	2	4	6
1996	Finland	WC	6	2	3	5	2
1996	Finland	WCH	3	0	0	0	4
1998	Finland	OLY	6	0	1	1	0
1998	Finland	WC	10	4	3	7	2
2001	Finland	WC	8	7	4	11	8
2002	Finland	OLY	4	1	2	3	4
2009	Finland	WC	7	2	3	5	2
2010	Finland	WC	7	1	1	2	0
Junior totals			20	8	11	19	10
Senior totals			77	24	21	45	34
