= 2001 IIHF World Championship =

2001 edition of the IIHF World Championship

Tournament details
- Host country: Germany
- Venues: 3 (in 3 host cities)
- Dates: 28 April – 13 May
- Opened by: Johannes Rau
- Teams: 16

Final positions
- Champions: Czech Republic (4th title)
- Runners-up: Finland
- Third place: Sweden
- Fourth place: United States

Tournament statistics
- Games played: 56
- Goals scored: 318 (5.68 per game)
- Attendance: 407,547 (7,278 per game)
- Scoring leader: (Finland) Juha Ylönen (14 points)

The 2001 IIHF World Championship was held between 28 April and 13 May 2001 in Nuremberg, Cologne and Hanover, Germany.

It was the 65th annual event, and was run by the International Ice Hockey Federation (IIHF).

== Venues ==
2001 IIHF World Championship is located in Germany	Preussag Arena Capacity: 10,767	Kölnarena Capacity: 18,500	Nuremberg Arena Capacity: 6,500
2001 IIHF World Championship is located in Germany	Germany – Hanover	Germany – Cologne	Germany – Nuremberg

== Qualification Tournament ==
Far Eastern Qualification for the tournament took place between September 4 and September 6, 2000, in Sapporo, Japan.

Team	Pld	W	D	L	GF	GA	GD	Pts
Japan	2	2	0	0	13	3	+10	4
China	2	1	0	1	13	6	+7	2
South Korea	2	0	0	2	1	18	−17	0

Source: IIHF

All times local

4 September 2000; 18:30	South Korea	0–8	Japan	Sapporo

5 September 2000; 18:30	China	10–1	South Korea	Sapporo

6 September 2000; 18:30	Japan	5–3	China	Sapporo

== Final tournament ==
In the first round, the top 3 teams from each group progressed to the second round, whilst the last placed team progressed to the consolation round.

=== First round ===
==== Group A ====
Team	Pld	W	D	L	GF	GA	GD	Pts
Czech Republic	3	2	1	0	10	4	+6	5
Germany	3	1	1	1	5	5	0	3
Switzerland	3	1	0	2	7	8	−1	2
Belarus	3	1	0	2	5	10	−5	2

Source: IIHF

All times local

28 April 2001; 15:15	Switzerland	1–3	Germany

28 April 2001; 16:00	Belarus	1–5	Czech Republic

29 April 2001; 20:00	Czech Republic	2–2	Germany

30 April 2001; 16:00	Switzerland	5–2	Belarus

1 May 2001; 20:00	Czech Republic	3–1	Switzerland

2 May 2001; 15:15	Germany	0–2	Belarus

==== Group B ====
Team	Pld	W	D	L	GF	GA	GD	Pts
Finland	3	3	0	0	18	3	+15	6
Slovakia	3	2	0	1	15	9	+6	4
Austria	3	1	0	2	4	12	−8	2
Japan	3	0	0	3	6	19	−13	0

Source: IIHF

All times local

28 April 2001; 20:00	Austria	1–5	Finland

29 April 2001; 16:00	Slovakia	8–4	Japan

30 April 2001; 16:00	Slovakia	5–0	Austria

30 April 2001; 20:00	Finland	8–0	Japan

2 May 2001; 16:00	Japan	2–3	Austria

2 May 2001; 20:00	Finland	5–2	Slovakia

==== Group C ====
Team	Pld	W	D	L	GF	GA	GD	Pts
Sweden	3	2	1	0	12	4	+8	5
United States	3	1	1	1	8	7	+1	3
Ukraine	3	1	0	2	7	13	−6	2
Latvia	3	1	0	2	6	9	−3	2

Source: IIHF

All times local

28 April 2001; 20:00	United States	6–3	Ukraine

29 April 2001; 16:00	Latvia	2–5	Sweden

30 April 2001; 20:00	United States	0–2	Latvia

1 May 2001; 20:00	Sweden	5–0	Ukraine

2 May 2001; 16:00	Ukraine	4–2	Latvia

2 May 2001; 20:00	Sweden	2–2	United States

==== Group D ====
Team	Pld	W	D	L	GF	GA	GD	Pts
Canada	3	3	0	0	13	2	+11	6
Russia	3	2	0	1	12	5	+7	4
Italy	3	0	1	2	5	14	−9	1
Norway	3	0	1	2	4	13	−9	1

Source: IIHF

All times local

28 April 2001; 16:00	Norway	0–5	Canada

28 April 2001; 20:00	Russia	7–0	Italy

29 April 2001; 20:00	Russia	4–0	Norway

30 April 2001; 16:00	Canada	3–1	Italy

1 May 2001; 20:00	Italy	4–4	Norway

2 May 2001; 20:00	Canada	5–1	Russia

=== Second round ===
In the Second Round, the top 4 teams from each group progressed to the Final Round, whilst the bottom 2 teams are eliminated.

==== Group E ====
Tables and scores below include meetings between teams during the First Round.

Team	Pld	W	D	L	GF	GA	GD	Pts
Czech Republic	5	4	1	0	24	8	+16	9
Canada	5	3	1	1	19	11	+8	7
Russia	5	3	0	2	16	11	+5	6
Germany	5	1	2	2	10	12	−2	4
Switzerland	5	1	0	4	13	15	−2	2
Italy	5	1	0	4	5	30	−25	2

Source: IIHF

28 April 2001; 15:15	Switzerland	1–3	Germany

28 April 2001; 20:00	Russia	7–0	Italy

29 April 2001; 20:00	Czech Republic	2–2	Germany

30 April 2001; 16:00	Canada	3–1	Italy

1 May 2001; 20:00	Czech Republic	3–1	Switzerland

2 May 2001; 20:00	Canada	5–1	Russia

4 May 2001; 15:15	Canada	6–2	Switzerland

4 May 2001; 20:00	Germany	1–3	Italy

5 May 2001; 16:00	Czech Republic	4–3	Russia

5 May 2001; 20:00	Canada	3–3	Germany

6 May 2001; 16:00	Russia	2–1	Switzerland

6 May 2001; 20:00	Czech Republic	11–0	Italy

7 May 2001; 16:00	Switzerland	8–1	Italy

8 May 2001; 16:00	Russia	3–1	Germany

8 May 2001; 20:00	Canada	2–4	Czech Republic

==== Group F ====
Tables and scores below include meetings between teams during the First Round.

Team	Pld	W	D	L	GF	GA	GD	Pts
Finland	5	4	0	1	23	12	+11	8
Sweden	5	3	1	1	25	8	+17	7
United States	5	3	1	1	15	10	+5	7
Slovakia	5	2	0	3	12	12	0	4
Ukraine	5	1	0	4	7	21	−14	2
Austria	5	1	0	4	4	23	−19	2

Source: IIHF

28 April 2001; 20:00	Austria	1–5	Finland

28 April 2001; 20:00	United States	6–3	Ukraine

30 April 2001; 16:00	Slovakia	5–0	Austria

1 May 2001; 20:00	Sweden	5–0	Ukraine

2 May 2001; 20:00	Finland	5–2	Slovakia

2 May 2001; 20:00	Sweden	2–2	United States

4 May 2001; 16:00	Slovakia	3–1	Ukraine

4 May 2001; 20:00	Sweden	11–0	Austria

5 May 2001; 16:00	Finland	1–4	United States

5 May 2001; 20:00	Sweden	3–1	Slovakia

6 May 2001; 16:00	United States	0–3	Austria

6 May 2001; 20:00	Finland	7–1	Ukraine

7 May 2001; 20:00	Ukraine	2–0	Austria

8 May 2001; 16:00	Slovakia	1–3	United States

8 May 2001; 20:00	Finland	5–4	Sweden

=== Consolation round 13–16 Place ===
==== Group G ====
Team	Pld	W	D	L	GF	GA	GD	Pts
Latvia	3	2	1	0	13	4	+9	5
Belarus	3	2	1	0	9	5	+4	5
Norway	3	0	1	2	5	9	−4	1
Japan	3	0	1	2	6	15	−9	1

Source: IIHF

As the Far Eastern qualifier, Japan avoids relegation. Therefore, Belarus and Norway are relegated to Division I for the 2002 Men's World Ice Hockey Championships

All times local

4 May 2001; 15:15	Latvia	2–2	Belarus

4 May 2001; 20:00	Norway	3–3	Japan

5 May 2001; 16:00	Belarus	3–2	Norway

5 May 2001; 20:00	Latvia	8–2	Japan

7 May 2001; 16:00	Belarus	4–1	Japan

7 May 2001; 20:00	Latvia	3–0	Norway

=== Final round ===
Quarter-finals
10 May
Czech Republic	2
Slovakia	0
10 May
Sweden	4
Russia	3
10 May
Canada	3
United States	4
10 May
Finland	4
Germany	1

Semi-finals
12 May
Czech Republic	3
Sweden	2
12 May
United States	1
Finland	3

Final
13 May
Czech Republic	3
Finland	2
Third place
13 May
United States	2
Sweden	3

=== Quarterfinals ===
10 May 2001; 16:00	Czech Republic	2-0 (1-0, 1-0, 0-0)	Slovakia	Preussag Arena, Hanover; Attendance: 3,681

Game reference

10 May 2001; 16:00	Germany	1-4 (0-1, 0-2, 1-1)	Finland	Kölnarena, Cologne; Attendance: 18,514

Game reference

10 May 2001; 20:00	Canada	3–4 OT (1-0, 2-3, 0-0) (OT: 0-1)	United States	Preussag Arena, Hanover; Attendance: 6,857

Game reference

10 May 2001; 20:00	Sweden	4-3 OT (0-1, 2-2, 1-0) (OT: 1-0)	Russia	Kölnarena, Cologne; Attendance: 18,498

Game reference

=== Semifinals ===
12 May 2001; 15:00	Czech Republic	3–2 GWS (1-0, 0-1, 1-1) (OT: 0–0) (SO: 2–1)	Sweden	Preussag Arena, Hanover; Attendance: 10,513

Game reference

12 May 2001; 19:00	Finland	3–1 (1-0, 0-1, 2-0)	United States	Preussag Arena, Hanover; Attendance: 10,513

Game reference

=== Match for third place ===
13 May 2001; 15:00	Sweden	3–2 (1-0, 1-1, 1-1)	United States	Preussag Arena, Hanover; Attendance: 10,513

Game reference

=== Final ===
13 May 2001; 19:00	Czech Republic	3–2 OT (0-1, 0-1, 2-0) (OT: 1–0)	Finland	Preussag Arena, Hanover; Attendance: 10,513

Game reference

	0-1	17:35 − Juha Lind
	0-2	38:39 − Juha Ylönen
Martin Procházka − 44:31	1-2
Jiří Dopita − 54:05	2-2
David Moravec − 70:38	3-2

== Ranking and statistics ==
2001 IIHF World Championship winners

Czech Republic
4th/10th title

=== Tournament Awards ===
- Best players selected by the directorate:
  - Best Goaltender: (Czech Republic) Milan Hnilička
  - Best Defenceman: (Sweden) Kim Johnsson
  - Best Forward: (Finland) Sami Kapanen
  - Most Valuable Player: (Czech Republic) David Moravec
- Media All-Star Team:
  - Goaltender: (Czech Republic) Milan Hnilička
  - Defence: (Sweden) Kim Johnsson, (Finland) Petteri Nummelin
  - Forwards: (Finland) Sami Kapanen, (Czech Republic) Robert Reichel, (Czech Republic) Martin Ručinský

=== Final standings ===
According to the IIHF: The final standings of the tournament according to IIHF:

1st place, gold medalist(s)	Czech Republic
2nd place, silver medalist(s)	Finland
3rd place, bronze medalist(s)	Sweden
4	United States
5	Canada
6	Russia
7	Slovakia
8	Germany
9	Switzerland
10	Ukraine
11	Austria
12	Italy
13	Latvia
14	Belarus
15	Norway
16	Japan

=== Scoring leaders ===
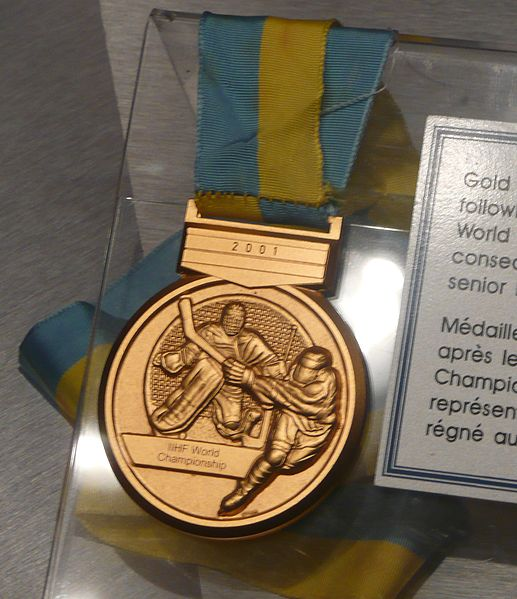
A gold medal that was awarded to Petr Čajánek.

List shows the top skaters sorted by points, then goals. If the list exceeds 10 skaters because of a tie in points, all of the tied skaters are left out.

Player	GP	G	A	Pts	+/−	PIM	POS
(Finland) Juha Ylönen	9	5	9	14	+9	2	F
(Finland) Petteri Nummelin	9	1	12	13	+4	0	D
(Czech Republic) Robert Reichel	9	5	7	12	+11	4	F
(Finland) Sami Kapanen	8	7	4	11	+5	8	F
(Sweden) Per-Johan Axelsson	9	3	6	9	+8	12	F
(Finland) Sami Salo	9	3	6	9	+9	6	D
(Czech Republic) Radek Dvořák	9	4	4	8	+8	8	F
(Sweden) Kim Johnsson	9	4	4	8	+11	6	D
(Sweden) Kristofer Ottosson	9	4	4	8	+10	0	F
(Sweden) Daniel Alfredsson	9	3	5	8	+6	6	F

=== Leading goaltenders ===
Only the top five goaltenders, based on save percentage, who have played 40% of their team's minutes are included in this list.

Player	MIP	SOG	GA	GAA	SVS%	SO
(Belarus) Leonid Fatikov	160:00	70	3	1.13	95.71	1
(Czech Republic) Milan Hnilička	540:38	269	13	1.44	95.17	1
(Finland) Pasi Nurminen	410:38	193	12	1.75	93.78	0
(United States) Robert Esche	359:11	188	13	2.17	93.09	1
(Russia) Maxim Sokolov	321:57	125	9	1.68	92.80	2

== IIHF honors and awards ==
The 2001 IIHF Hall of Fame induction ceremony has held in Hanover during the World Championships. Isao Kataoka of Japan was given the Paul Loicq Award for outstanding contributions to international ice hockey.

IIHF Hall of Fame inductees

- Dave King, Canada
- Sergei Makarov, Russia
- Vladimír Martinec, Czech Republic
- György Pásztor, Hungary
- Hans Rampf, Germany
- Ulf Sterner, Sweden

== See also ==
- IIHF World Championship
