= 2005 IIHF World Championship =

2005 edition of the IIHF World Championship

Tournament details
- Host country: Austria
- Venues: 2 (in 2 host cities)
- Dates: 30 April – 15 May
- Opened by: Heinz Fischer
- Teams: 16

Final positions
- Champions: Czech Republic (5th title)
- Runners-up: Canada
- Third place: Russia
- Fourth place: Sweden

Tournament statistics
- Games played: 56
- Goals scored: 289 (5.16 per game)
- Attendance: 323,974 (5,785 per game)
- Scoring leader: (Canada) Joe Thornton (16 points)

The 2005 IIHF Ice Hockey World Championship was held 30 April – 15 May 2005 in Vienna and Innsbruck, Austria. It was the 69th annual event, and was run by the International Ice Hockey Federation (IIHF).

== Venues ==
Wiener Stadthalle Capacity: 16,000	2005 IIHF World Championship is located in Austria	Olympic Ice Hockey Center Capacity: 7,800
Austria – Vienna	2005 IIHF World Championship is located in Austria	Austria – Innsbruck

== Preliminary round ==
Sixteen participating teams were placed in the following four groups. After playing a round-robin, the top three teams in each group advanced to the qualifying round. The last team in each group competed in the relegation round.

=== Group A ===
Team	Pld	W	D	L	GF	GA	GD	Pts	Qualification
Slovakia	3	2	1	0	13	5	+8	5	Qualifying round
Russia	3	2	1	0	9	5	+4	5	Qualifying round
Belarus	3	1	0	2	6	4	+2	2	Qualifying round
Austria	3	0	0	3	3	17	−14	0	Relegation round

All times local (UTC +3)

April 30, 2005; 16:15	Russia	4–2 (1–1, 1–0, 2–1)	Austria	Wiener Stadthalle, Vienna; Attendance: 8024

Game reference

Maxim Sokolov
Goalies
Bernd Brückler
Referees:
(Russia) Yuriy Oskirko
(Canada) Rob Matsuoka

Ovechkin (Malkin) – 10:10	1–0
	1–1	15:48 - Setzinger (Kalt, Viveiros) (PP)
Kharitonov (SH) – 23:10	2–1
	2–2	47:07 - Divis (Unterluggauer)
Kovalev (Markov) – 56:18	3–2
Kovalchuk (EN) – 59:51	4–2

14 min
Penalties
12 min
36
Shots
25

April 30, 2005; 20:15	Slovakia	2–1 (0-0, 0-0, 2-1)	Belarus	Wiener Stadthalle, Vienna; Attendance: 8025

Game reference

Ján Lašák
Goalies
Andrei Mezin
Referee:
(Canada) Brent Reiber

Hossa (Gáborík, Demitra) – 41:45	1-0
	1-1	43:26 - Koltsov (Grabovski)
Gáborík (Hossa) – 56:32	2-1

10 min
Penalties
4 min
52
Shots
19

May 2, 2005; 16:15	Slovakia	3–3 (1-0, 1-2, 1-1)	Russia	Wiener Stadthalle, Vienna; Attendance: 7800

Game reference

Ján Lašák
Goalies
Maxim Sokolov
Referee:
(Finland) Hannu Henriksson

Pálffy (Štrbák) (PP) – 12:57	1-0
Hossa (Stümpel, Štrbák) (PP) – 29:23	2-0
	2-1	29:45 - Nepryaev (Antipov)
	2-2	32:22 - Markov (Karpovtsev) (PP2)
Višňovský (Pálffy, Országh) (PP) – 41:27	3-2
	3-3	57:39 - Kozlov (Kovalchuk)

10 min
Penalties
14 min
22
Shots
41

May 2, 2005; 20:15	Belarus	5–0 (1-0, 2-0, 2-0)	Austria	Wiener Stadthalle, Vienna; Attendance: 7691

Game reference

Andrei Mezin
Goalies
Bernd Brückler
Referee:
(Czech Republic) Milan Minar

Grabovski (Mikulchik, Koltsov) (PP) – 14:41	1-0
Grabovski (Koltsov, Tsyplakov) – 29:34	2-0
Zadelenov (Svita, Skabelka) – 38:58	3-0
Grabovski (Koltsov, Bashko) (PP) – 44:19	4-0
Grabovski (Erkovich, Tsyplakov) (PP) – 49:43	5-0

14 min
Penalties
18 min
31
Shots
29

May 4, 2005; 16:15	Russia	2–0 (0-0, 1-0, 1-0)	Belarus	Wiener Stadthalle, Vienna; Attendance: 7037

Game reference
Sergei Zvyagin	Goalies	Andrei Mezin	Referee: (Germany) Richard Schuetz
Kharitonov (Datsyuk, Vyshedkevich) – 28:22 / 1-0; Vyshedkevich (Markov, Kovalev) – 51:40 / 2-0			Referee: (Germany) Richard Schuetz
4 min	Penalties	6 min	Referee: (Germany) Richard Schuetz
33	Shots	12	Referee: (Germany) Richard Schuetz

May 4, 2005; 20:15	Austria	1–8 (0-1, 0-2, 1-5)	Slovakia	Wiener Stadthalle, Vienna; Attendance: 8635

Game reference

Patrick Machreich
Goalies
Rastislav Staňa
Referee:
(Sweden) Thomas Andersson

	0–1	2:44 - Gáborík (Hossa, Demitra)
	0–2	21:06 - Pálffy (Višňovský, Staňa)
	0–3	33:52 - Višňovský (Pálffy, Stümpel) (PP)
	0–4	42:56 - Hossa (Demitra, Chára)
Unterluggauer (Ulrich, Trattnig) (PP) – 48:08	1–4
	1–5	50:28 - Zedník (Štrbák, Stümpel) (PP)
	1–6	55:04 - Handzuš (Šatan, Pucher)
	1–7	55:28 - Štrbák (Višňovský, Pucher)(PP)
	1–8	55:47 - Pálffy (Stümpel, Pucher)

24 min
Penalties
14 min
17
Shots
49

=== Group B ===
Team	Pld	W	D	L	GF	GA	GD	Pts	Qualification
Canada	3	3	0	0	17	5	+12	6	Qualifying round
United States	3	2	0	1	11	4	+7	4	Qualifying round
Latvia	3	1	0	2	8	10	−2	2	Qualifying round
Slovenia	3	0	0	3	1	18	−17	0	Relegation round

All times local (UTC +3)

April 30, 2005; 16:15	Latvia	4–6 (1-1, 1-4, 2-1)	Canada	Olympiaworld, Innsbruck; Attendance: 5344

Game reference

Edgars Masaļskis
Artūrs Irbe
Goalies
Martin Brodeur
Referee:
(Germany) Richard Schuetz

	0 - 1	2:55 - Morrison (Redden, Marleau) (PP)
Semjonovs (Ņiživijs, Tambijevs) – 03:29	1 - 1
	1 - 2	27:49 - Thornton (Nash) (PP)
Ankipāns (Sprukts, Macijevskis) – 30:55	2 - 2
	2 - 3	34:00 - Nash (PP)
	2 - 4	35:32 - Marleau (Heatley) (PP)
	2 - 5	36:50 - Nash (Boyle, Thornton)
Sprukts (Ignatjevs, Ankipans) (PP) – 46:16	3 - 5
Skrastiņš (Širokovs, Panteļejevs) – 49:00	4 - 5
	4 - 6	54:17 - Nash (Gagné, Thornton)

8 min
Penalties
14 min
25
Shots
46

May 1, 2005; 16:15	United States	7–0 (3-0, 2-0, 2-0)	Slovenia	Olympiaworld, Innsbruck; Attendance: 4540

Game reference

Rick DiPietro
Goalies
Robert Kristan
Referee:
(Russia) Vyacheslav Bulanov

Knuble (Cole) – 00:31	1 - 0
Hall (Legwand) – 16:34	2 - 0
Parrish (Weight) – 18:59	3 - 0
Knuble – 25:48	4 - 0
Halpern (Gionta) – 27:57	5 - 0
Stastny (Cole) (SH) – 51:19	6 - 0
Gionta (York) (PP) – 58:34	7 - 0

8 min
Penalties
10 min
38
Shots
16

May 3, 2005; 16:15	Canada	8–0 (3-0, 2-0, 3-0)	Slovenia	Olympiaworld, Innsbruck; Attendance: 5370

Game reference

Roberto Luongo
Goalies
Gaber Glavič
Referee:
(Slovakia) Rudolf Lauff

Thornton – 01:03	1 - 0
Thornton (Gagné) – 05:08	2 - 0
Morrison (Smyth) – 13:17	3 - 0
Maltby (Draper) – 21:49	4 - 0
Gagné (Redden, Thornton) (PP) – 32:58	5 - 0
Nash (Thornton, Redden) – 44:53	6 - 0
Morrison (Phillips) – 46:43	7 - 0
Smyth (Maltby, Draper) – 54:23	8 - 0

8 min
Penalties
10 min
55
Shots
12

May 3, 2005; 20:15	United States	3–1 (0-1, 1-0, 2-0)	Latvia	Olympiaworld, Innsbruck; Attendance: 5460

Game reference

Ty Conklin
Goalies
Artūrs Irbe
Referee:
(Czech Republic) Vladimír Šindler

	0 - 1	16:17 - Sprukts (Ankipāns, Cipulis)
Weight (Cole) – 33:36	1 - 1
Parrish (Weight, Cole) (PP) 47:44	2 - 1
Parrish (Miller, Weight) – 59:58	3 - 1

12 min
Penalties
10 min
30
Shots
17

May 5, 2005; 16:15	Slovenia	1–3 (0-1, 1-1, 0-1)	Latvia	Olympiaworld, Innsbruck; Attendance: 6300

Game reference

Gaber Glavič
Goalies
Artūrs Irbe
Referee:
(Czech Republic) Milan Minar

	0 - 1	12:17 - Cipulis (Ankipāns, Laviņš) (PP)
	0 - 2	25:51 - Tribuncovs (Panteļejevs, Cipruss)
Goličič – 31:55	1 - 2
	1 - 3	59:35 - Ankipāns (Ignatjevs) (EN)

18 min
Penalties
8 min
22
Shots
39

May 5, 2005; 20:15	Canada	3 - 1 (0-0, 2-1, 1-0)	United States	Olympiaworld, Innsbruck; Attendance: 6307

Game reference

Martin Brodeur
Goalies
Rick DiPietro
Referee:
(Canada) Brent Reiber

Nash – 20:51	1 - 0
	1 - 1	25:16 - Knuble (Hauer) (PP)
Nash (Boyle) – 31:29	2 - 1
Thornton (Nash, Jovanovski) (PP) – 52:22	3 - 1

14 min
Penalties
8 min
25
Shots
35

=== Group C ===
Team	Pld	W	D	L	GF	GA	GD	Pts	Qualification
Sweden	3	3	0	0	15	3	+12	6	Qualifying round
Finland	3	2	0	1	7	7	0	4	Qualifying round
Ukraine	3	1	0	2	5	8	−3	2	Qualifying round
Denmark	3	0	0	3	2	11	−9	0	Relegation round

All times local (UTC +3)

April 30, 2005; 20:15	Finland	2–1 (1-0, 0-0, 1-1)	Denmark	Olympiaworld, Innsbruck; Attendance: 5030

Game reference

Fredrik Norrena
Goalies
Peter Hirsch
Referee:
(Slovakia) Rudolf Lauff

Karalahti (J. Jokinen, Kapanen) (PP) – 18:42	1 - 0
Kapanen (Hentunen, Parssinen) – 41:43	2 - 0
	2 - 1	59:02 - K. Degn (Andreasen)

8 min
Penalties
10 min
32
Shots
15

May 1, 2005; 20:15	Ukraine	2–3 (0-2, 2-0, 0-1)	Sweden	Olympiaworld, Innsbruck; Attendance: 4061

Game reference

Kostyantyn Simchuk
Goalies
Henrik Lundqvist
Referee:
(Czech Republic) Vladimír Šindler

	0 - 1	5:17 - Kahnberg (Rhodin, Nordström)
	0 - 2	9:07 - K. Jönsson (Rhodin, Alfredsson) (PP)
Savenko (Gunko, Bobrovnikov) – 26:32	1 - 2
Klymentyev – 32:37	2 - 2
	2 - 3	50:08 - Alfredsson (Bäckman, Påhlsson)

18 min
Penalties
6 min
17
Shots
47

May 2, 2005; 16:15	Finland	4–1 (1-0, 2-1, 1-0)	Ukraine	Olympiaworld, Innsbruck; Attendance: 4386

Game reference

Niklas Bäckström
Goalies
Kostyantyn Simchuk
Referee:
(Germany) Richard Schuetz

Niemi (Nummelin, Kallio) (PP) – 08:30	1 - 0
Peltonen (O. Jokinen, Kallio) – 23:55	2 - 0
Timonen (Pärssinen, Kapanen) – 27:20	3 - 0
	3 - 1	35:38 - Varlamov (Timchenko, Shakhraychuk)
Hentunen (Karalahti, Kapanen) – 57:38	4 - 1

10 min
Penalties
18 min
53
Shots
20

May 2, 2005; 20:15	Sweden	7–0 (2-0, 3-0, 2-0)	Denmark	Olympiaworld, Innsbruck; Attendance: 4457

Game reference

Henrik Lundqvist
Goalies
Peter Hirsch
Referee:
(Canada) Brent Reiber

D. Sedin (Sundin, Johansson) – 09:33	1 - 0
Axelsson (Alfredsson, Påhlsson) – 12:58	2 - 0
D. Sedin (Samuelsson, Norström) – 25:29	3 - 0
Alfredsson (Kronwall) – 32:29	4 - 0
Kahnberg (Kronwall, Norström) – 38:05	5 - 0
Hedström (Zetterberg, Höglund) – 47:19	6 - 0
H. Sedin (D. Sedin) – 56:47	7 - 0

4 min
Penalties
4 min
49
Shots
12

May 4, 2005; 16:15	Denmark	1–2 (0-0, 1-1, 0-1)	Ukraine	Olympiaworld, Innsbruck; Attendance: 5623

Game reference

Peter Hirsch
Goalies
Kostyantyn Simchuk
Referee:
(United States) Rick Looker

L. Degn (Green) (PP) – 28:28	1 - 0
	1 - 1	34:57 - Varlamov (Kasianchuk, Shakhraychuk)
	1 - 2	57:48 - Savenko (Bobrovnikov, Semenchenko)

8 min
Penalties
12 min
29
Shots
31

May 4, 2005; 20:15	Sweden	5–1 (2-1, 2-0, 1-0)	Finland	Olympiaworld, Innsbruck; Attendance: 6202

Game reference

Henrik Lundqvist
Goalies
Fredrik Norrena
Referee:
(Russia) Vyacheslav Bulanov

	0 - 1	00:50 - Niemi (Pärssinen)
Kronwall (D. Sedin, H. Sedin) – 02:17	1 - 1
Sundin (H. Sedin, D. Sedin) – 16:03	2 - 1
Hedström (Weinhandl) – 27:11	3 - 1
Påhlsson (Johansson, Sundin) – 34:40	4 - 1
Hedström (Alfredsson) (PP) – 58:18	5 - 1

12 min
Penalties
18 min
36
Shots
26

=== Group D ===
Team	Pld	W	D	L	GF	GA	GD	Pts	Qualification
Czech Republic	3	3	0	0	6	1	+5	6	Qualifying round
Switzerland	3	2	0	1	8	5	+3	4	Qualifying round
Kazakhstan	3	1	0	2	3	4	−1	2	Qualifying round
Germany	3	0	0	3	2	9	−7	0	Relegation round

All times local (UTC +3)

May 1, 2005; 16:15	Switzerland	1–3 (1-2, 0-0, 0-1)	Czech Republic	Wiener Stadthalle, Vienna; Attendance: 7328

Game reference

Martin Gerber
Goalies
Tomáš Vokoun
Referee:
(United States) Rick Looker

	0 - 1	4:52 - Prospal (Kubina, Dvořák) (PP)
	0 - 2	7:31 - Jágr (Prospal, Kubina) (PP)
Blindenbacher (Wichser, Lemm) (PP) – 12:42	1 - 2
	1 - 3	45:56 - F. Kaberle (Ručinský) (PP)

16 min
Penalties
10 min
23
Shots
42

May 1, 2005; 20:15	Germany	1–2 (0-2, 1-0, 0-0)	Kazakhstan	Wiener Stadthalle, Vienna; Attendance: 6676

Game reference

Oliver Jonas
Goalies
Vitaliy Kolesnik
Referee:
(Sweden) Thomas Andersson

	0 - 1	1:24 - Upper (Blokhin, Vladimir Antipin) (PP1)
	0 - 2	17:55 - Y. Koreshkov (Koledayev, A. Koreshkov)
Martinec (Fical, Lewandowski) – 39:22	1 - 2

14 min
Penalties
14 min
35
Shots
20

May 3, 2005; 16:15	Kazakhstan	1–2 (1-1, 0-0, 0-1)	Switzerland	Wiener Stadthalle, Vienna; Attendance: 7500

Game reference

Vitaliy Kolesnik
Goalies
Martin Gerber
Referee:
(Canada) Rob Matsuoka

Litvinenko (Kovalenko) – 06:37	1 - 0
	1 - 1	10:23 - Fischer (Lemm, Wichser)
	1 - 2	44:14 - Jeannin (Wichser)

16 min
Penalties
16 min
26
Shots
37

May 3, 2005; 20:15	Czech Republic	2–0 (1-0, 0-0, 1-0)	Germany	Wiener Stadthalle, Vienna; Attendance: 8000

Game reference
Tomáš Vokoun	Goalies	Robert Müller	Referee: (Finland) Hannu Henriksson
Kubina (Jágr, Prospal) (PP) – 07:22 / 1 - 0; Sýkora – 53:51 / 2 - 0			Referee: (Finland) Hannu Henriksson
12 min	Penalties	14 min	Referee: (Finland) Hannu Henriksson
32	Shots	18	Referee: (Finland) Hannu Henriksson

May 5, 2005; 16:15	Czech Republic	1–0 (0-0, 1-0, 0-0)	Kazakhstan	Wiener Stadthalle, Vienna; Attendance: 7041

Game reference
Milan Hnilička	Goalies	Vitaliy Kolesnik	Referee: (Slovakia) Rudolf Lauff
Hemský (Ručinský) – 30:44 / 1 - 0			Referee: (Slovakia) Rudolf Lauff
10 min	Penalties	16 min	Referee: (Slovakia) Rudolf Lauff
39	Shots	16	Referee: (Slovakia) Rudolf Lauff

May 5, 2005; 20:15	Germany	1–5 (1-1, 0-1, 0-3)	Switzerland	Wiener Stadthalle, Vienna; Attendance: 7900

Game reference

Oliver Jonas
Goalies
Martin Gerber
Referee:
(Sweden) Thomas Andersson

	0 - 1	5:39 - Ivo Rüthemann (Streit) (PP1)
Furchner (Lewandowski) – 15:10	1 - 1
	1 - 2	28:28 - Plüss (Ivo Rüthemann, Streit) (PP1)
	1 - 3	48:33 - Fischer (Streit) (PP1)
	1 - 4	52:00 - Plüss (Streit, DiPietro) (PP1)
	1 - 5	52:55 - Forster (EN)

37 min
Penalties
20 min
26
Shots
30

== Qualifying round ==
The top three teams from each group in the first round advance to the qualifying round. The top three teams from Groups A and D advance to Group E, and the top three teams from Groups B and C advance to Group F.

Teams in the qualifying round carry forward the results and points gained in the preliminary round with the teams that they have played and advance with. Teams, which have played in the preliminary round, do not meet again in the qualifying round.

=== Group E ===
Team	Pld	W	D	L	GF	GA	GD	Pts	Qualification
Russia	5	3	2	0	13	8	+5	8	Playoff round
Czech Republic	5	4	0	1	15	5	+10	8	Playoff round
Slovakia	5	3	1	1	12	11	+1	7	Playoff round
Switzerland	5	2	1	2	9	10	−1	5	Playoff round
Belarus	5	1	0	4	4	11	−7	2	Eliminated
Kazakhstan	5	0	0	5	3	11	−8	0	Eliminated

All times local (UTC+3)

May 6, 2005; 20:15	Russia	3–3 (2-2, 1-1, 0-0)	Switzerland	Wiener Stadthalle, Vienna; Attendance: 5680

Game reference

Sergei Zvyagin
Goalies
David Aebischer
Referee:
(United States) Rick Looker

	0 - 1	01:43 - Lemm (Fischer, Blindenbacher) (PP)
Datsyuk (Kovalev) – 02:28	1 - 1
Kovalchuk (Zinoviev) (PP) – 05:11	2 - 1
	2 - 2	8:52 - DiPietro (Pluss)
	2 - 3	22:38 - Streit (DiPietro) (PP2)
Kovalev (Datsyuk) – 38:26	3 - 3

12 min
Penalties
20 min
33
Shots
15

May 7, 2005; 16:15	Belarus	2–0 (0-0, 1-0, 1-0)	Kazakhstan	Wiener Stadthalle, Vienna; Attendance: 6234

Game reference
Andrei Mezin	Goalies	Vitaliy Kolesnik	Referee: (Finland) Hannu Henriksson
Erkovich (Zadelenov, Skabelka) (PP) – 29:20 / 1 - 0; Koltsov (Tsyplakov) (EN) – 59:58 / 2 - 0			Referee: (Finland) Hannu Henriksson
8 min	Penalties	10 min	Referee: (Finland) Hannu Henriksson
27	Shots	37	Referee: (Finland) Hannu Henriksson

May 7, 2005; 20:15	Slovakia	1–5 (0-2, 1-3, 0-0)	Czech Republic	Wiener Stadthalle, Vienna; Attendance: 7614

Game reference

Rastislav Stana
Ján Lašák
Goalies
Tomáš Vokoun
Referee:
(Sweden) Thomas Andersson

	0 - 1	01:49 - Sýkora (Hlaváč, Fischer)
	0 - 2	14:24 - Straka (Prospal, T. Kaberle)
Štrbák (Višňovský, Pálffy) (PP) – 27:23	1 - 2
	1 - 3	30:51 - T. Kaberle (Výborný, Jágr) (PP)
	1 - 4	31:31 - Hemský (Hlaváč, Čajánek
	1 - 5	32:23 - Kubina (Jágr, Straka) (PP)

8 min
Penalties
12 min
29
Shots
28

May 8, 2005; 16:15	Slovakia	3–1 (0-0, 2-1, 1-0)	Switzerland	Wiener Stadthalle, Vienna; Attendance: 7522

Game reference

Ján Lašák
Goalies
Martin Gerber
Referee:
(Canada) Rob Matsuoka

	0 - 1	23:49 - Rüthemann (Lemm, Forster) (PP)
Šatan (Demitra) (PP) – 34:34	1 - 1
Hossa (Demitra, Chára) – 38:29	2 - 1
Pálffy (Stümpel, Šatan) – 44:12	3 - 1

6 min
Penalties
8 min
41
Shots
18

May 8, 2005; 20:15	Czech Republic	1–2 (1-0, 0-1, 0-1)	Russia	Wiener Stadthalle, Vienna; Attendance: 7709

Game reference

Tomáš Vokoun
Goalies
Maxim Sokolov
Referee:
(Finland) Hannu Henriksson

Výborný (Jágr, Židlický) (PP) – 16:32	1 - 0
	1 - 1	32:59 - Kovalchuk (Zinoviev, Ryazantsev) (PP)
	1 - 2	48:12 - Semin (Kovalchuk, Denisov) (PP)

22 min
Penalties
12 min
36
Shots
20

May 9, 2005; 16:15	Russia	3–1 (0-0, 3-0, 0-1)	Kazakhstan	Wiener Stadthalle, Vienna; Attendance: 5520

Game reference

Maxim Sokolov
Goalies
Vitaliy Kolesnik
Sergey Ogureshnikov
Referee:
(Sweden) Thomas Andersson

Datsyuk (Markov, Ovechkin) – 23:46	1 - 0
Ovechkin (Datsyuk, Kovalev) – 27:42	2 - 0
Zinoviev (Kovalchuk) – 35:47	3 - 0
	3 - 1	57:38 - Dudarev (Kozlov, Upper)

6 min
Penalties
14 min
49
Shots
19

May 9, 2005; 20:15	Switzerland	2–0 (1-0, 0-0, 1-0)	Belarus	Wiener Stadthalle, Vienna; Attendance: 5502

Game reference
Martin Gerber	Goalies	Andrei Mezin	Referee: (Finland) Hannu Henriksson
Bezina (Jeannin, Fischer) – 01:55 / 1 - 0; Ziegler (Streit, Plüss) (EN) – 59:34 / 2 - 0			Referee: (Finland) Hannu Henriksson
12 min	Penalties	14 min	Referee: (Finland) Hannu Henriksson
25	Shots	17	Referee: (Finland) Hannu Henriksson

May 10, 2005; 16:15	Kazakhstan	1–3 (1-1, 0-1, 0-1)	Slovakia	Wiener Stadthalle, Vienna; Attendance: 5967

Game reference

Sergey Ogureshnikov
Goalies
Ján Lašák
Referee:
(United States) Rick Looker

	0 - 1	05:58 - Šatan (Stümpel, Štrbák) (PP)
Ogorodnikov (Trochshinskiy, Pchelyakov) (PP) – 09:47	1 - 1
	1 - 2	23:17 - Pálffy (Višňovský, Stümpel) (PP)
	1 - 3	42:54 - Handzuš (Zedník)

20 min
Penalties
12 min
16
Shots
50

May 10, 2005; 20:15	Czech Republic	5–1 (1-0, 2-1, 2-0)	Belarus	Wiener Stadthalle, Vienna; Attendance: 6201

Game reference

Tomáš Vokoun
Goalies
Sergei Shabanov
Referee:
(Canada) Rob Matsuoka

Čajánek (Ručinský, Židlický) – 16:28	1 - 0
Hlaváč (Výborný) – 26:43	2 - 0
Jágr (Prospal, T. Kaberle) – 32:46	3 - 0
	3 - 1	37:59 - Koltsov (Tsyplakov)
Straka (Jágr, T. Kaberle) – 46:42	4 - 1
Varaďa (Vrbata, Vašíček) – 49:41	5 - 1

8 min
Penalties
6 min
48
Shots
10

=== Group F ===
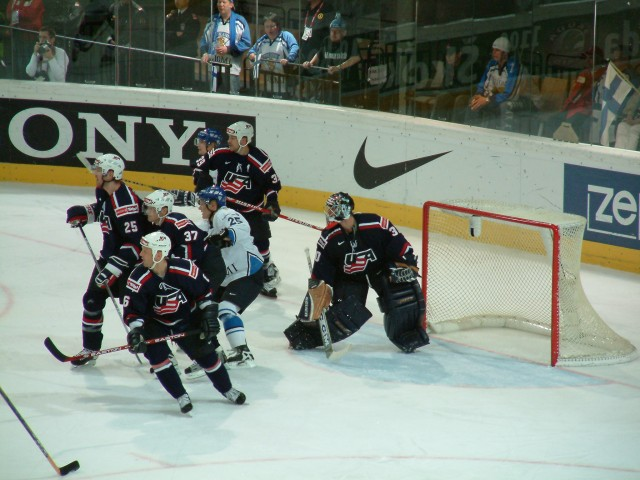
United States against Finland

Team	Pld	W	D	L	GF	GA	GD	Pts	Qualification
Sweden	5	4	0	1	23	13	+10	8	Playoff round
Canada	5	3	1	1	18	14	+4	7	Playoff round
United States	5	2	2	1	14	10	+4	6	Playoff round
Finland	5	1	3	1	12	13	−1	5	Playoff round
Latvia	5	1	1	3	9	18	−9	3	Eliminated
Ukraine	5	0	1	4	5	13	−8	1	Eliminated

May 6, 2005; 20:15	United States	4–4 (1-1, 0-0, 3-3)	Finland	Olympiaworld, Innsbruck; Attendance: 3540

Game reference

Ty Conklin
Goalies
Niklas Bäckström
Referee:
(Czech Republic) Milan Minar

	0 - 1	03:38 - Pärssinen (Timonen) (PP)
Park (Weight, Roach) (PP) – 12:30	1 - 1
Hauer (Leopold) (PP) – 45:16	2 - 1
Modano (Cole, Knuble) – 46:37	3 - 1
	3 - 2	46:53 - Hagman (Rita, Väänänen)
	3 - 3	53:10 - O. Jokinen (Peltonen, Nummelin)
	3 - 4	54:57 - Ruutu (Karalahti, Bäckström
Parrish (Roach) – 59:20	4 - 4

8 min
Penalties
12 min
22
Shots
27

May 7, 2005; 16:15	Latvia	3–0 (0-0, 1-0, 2-0)	Ukraine	Olympiaworld, Innsbruck; Attendance: 4702

Game reference

Artūrs Irbe
Goalies
Kostyantyn Simchuk
Referee:
(Canada) Brent Reiber

Tambijevs (Nizivijs, Semjonovs) – 33:38	1 - 0
Skrastiņš (Ankipāns, Cipulis) – 45:15	2 - 0
Semjonovs (Tambijevs) – 57:05	3 - 0

4 min
Penalties
12 min
30
Shots
17

May 7, 2005; 20:15	Canada	4–5 (2-1, 1-3, 1-1)	Sweden	Olympiaworld, Innsbruck; Attendance: 5558

Game reference

Martin Brodeur
Goalies
Henrik Lundqvist
Referee:
(Russia) Vyacheslav Bulanov

Thornton (Gagné) – 08:13	1 - 0
Heatley (Doan) – 08:48	2 - 0
	2 - 1	16:27 - D. Sedin (Samuelsson)
Doan (Souray) – 22:07	3 - 1
	3 - 2	26:56 - Påhlsson (K. Jönsson, Nordström)
	3 - 3	28:14 - Samuelsson (K. Jönsson, Norström)
	3 - 4	38:27 - Zetterberg (Påhlsson, Hedström)
Nash (Thornton, Gagné) (PP) – 46:50	4 - 4
	4 - 5	53:47 - K. Jönsson (Påhlsson, Norström)

16 min
Penalties
12 min
31
Shots
42

May 8, 2005; 16:15	Canada	3–3 (0-1, 1-1, 2-1)	Finland	Olympiaworld, Innsbruck; Attendance: 5333

Game reference

Roberto Luongo
Goalies
Niklas Bäckström
Referee:
(Slovakia) Rudolf Lauff

	0 - 1	11:00 - Hagman (O. Jokinen)
	0 - 2	24:02 - Hentunen (Kapanen, Pärssinen) (PP)
Redden (Heatley) – 39:10	1 - 2
	1 - 3	46:19 - Kallio (O. Jokinen)
Nash (Gagné) – 48:58	2 - 3
Marleau (Morrow) – 49:49	3 - 3

8 min
Penalties
6 min
24
Shots
31

May 8, 2005; 20:15	Sweden	1–5 (0-1, 0-2, 1-2)	United States	Olympiaworld, Innsbruck; Attendance: 4708

Game reference

Henrik Lundqvist
Goalies
Rick DiPietro
Referee:
(Germany) Richard Schütz

	0 - 1	19:42 - Knuble (Miller, Modano)
	0 - 2	26:21 - Stastny (DiPietro) (SH)
	0 - 3	27:40 - Cole (Knuble)
	0 - 4	47:39 - Modano (Roach)
	0 - 5	48:43 - Gionta (Parise)
Franzén (Höglund, J. Jönsson) – 50:23	1 - 5

8 min
Penalties
16 min
28
Shots
20

May 9, 2005; 16:15	United States	1–1 (0-0, 0-1, 1-0)	Ukraine	Olympiaworld, Innsbruck; Attendance: 1909

Game reference
Ty Conklin	Goalies	Kostyantyn Simchuk	Referee: (Slovakia) Rudolf Lauff
/ 0 - 1 / 30:15 - Kasianchuk (Semenchenko); Hauer (Weight) (PP) – 42:45 / 1 - 1			Referee: (Slovakia) Rudolf Lauff
12 min	Penalties	18 min	Referee: (Slovakia) Rudolf Lauff
39	Shots	9	Referee: (Slovakia) Rudolf Lauff

May 9, 2005; 20:15	Finland	0–0 (0-0, 0-0, 0-0)	Latvia	Olympiaworld, Innsbruck; Attendance: 2235

Game reference
Niklas Bäckström	Goalies	Artūrs Irbe	Referee: (Canada) Brent Reiber
4 min	Penalties	8 min	Referee: (Canada) Brent Reiber
29	Shots	15	Referee: (Canada) Brent Reiber

May 10, 2005; 16:15	Ukraine	1–2 (1-1, 0-0, 0-1)	Canada	Olympiaworld, Innsbruck; Attendance: 2211

Game reference

Kostyantyn Simchuk
Goalies
Martin Brodeur
Referee:
(Czech Republic) Vladimír Šindler

	0 - 1	06:43 - Morrison (Heatley, Doan)
Sryubko (Savenko, Bobrovnikov) – 10:43	1 - 1
	1 - 2	49:54 - Nash (Jovanovski, Thornton)

14 min
Penalties
8 min
23
Shots
35

May 10, 2005; 20:15	Sweden	9–1 (3-0, 2-0, 4-1)	Latvia	Olympiaworld, Innsbruck; Attendance: 2349

Game reference

Henrik Lundqvist
Goalies
Artūrs Irbe
Edgars Masaļskis
Referee:
(Germany) Richard Schütz

Kronwall (Påhlsson, Alfredsson) – 00:28	1 - 0
Alfredsson – 14:47	2 - 0
Bäckman (Alfredsson, Hedström) (PP) – 19:15	3 - 0
Rhodin (Alfredsson, Zetterberg) (PP) – 21:05	4 - 0
Johansson (Samuelsson, Zetterberg) – 36:10	5 - 0
J. Jönsson (Nordström, Johansson) – 40:24	6 - 0
J. Jönsson (Nordström, Höglund) – 46:41	7 - 0
Nordström (Höglund, Norström) – 47:01	8 - 0
	8 - 1	50:04 - Ziediņš (Rēdlihs, Galviņš)
Höglund (J. Jönsson, Norström) (PP) – 52:50	9 - 1

14 min
Penalties
16 min
31
Shots
20

== Relegation round ==
The consolation round is composed of the four teams that placed last in Groups A through D. They play in a round-robin fashion, and the bottom two teams get relegated to the Division I group in next year's World Championships.

=== Group G ===
Team	Pld	W	D	L	GF	GA	GD	Pts	Qualification or relegation
Slovenia	3	2	0	1	11	14	−3	4	Qualified for the 2006 IIHF World Championship
Denmark	3	2	0	1	10	9	+1	4	Qualified for the 2006 IIHF World Championship
Germany	3	1	1	1	13	6	+7	3	Relegated to Division I
Austria	3	0	1	2	7	12	−5	1	Relegated to Division I

All times local (UTC +3)

May 6, 2005; 16:15	Germany	2–2 (2-0, 0-1, 0-1)	Austria	Wiener Stadthalle, Vienna; Attendance: 6150

Game reference

Robert Müller
Goalies
Bernd Brückler
Referee:
(Canada) Rob Matsuoka

4:42 - Kathan (Felski, Barta)	1 - 0
16:09 - Barta (Kathan)	2 - 0
	2 - 1	22:24 - A. Lakos (Welser, Setzinger)
	2 - 2	51:06 - Welser (Lakos, Viveiros) (PP1)

12 min
Penalties
10 min
27
Shots
28

May 6, 2005; 16:15	Slovenia	4–3 (0-3, 1-0, 3-0)	Denmark	Olympiaworld, Innsbruck; Attendance: 3709

Game reference

Gaber Glavič
Goalies
Peter Hirsch
Referee:
(Czech Republic) Vladimír Šindler

	0 - 1	5:05 - Damgaard (Green, Andersen)(PP1)
	0 - 2	11:55 - K. Degn (Green, Akesson)
	0 - 3	12:17 - Nielsen (Kjærgaard, Regin)
37:26 - Jan (Varl, Rodman)	1 - 3
43:47 - Kopitar (Jan)	2 - 3
44:10 - Rožič (Žagar, Razingar)	3 - 3
51:15 - Terglav (Kontrec) (SH1)	4 - 3

20 min
Penalties
12 min
24
Shots
30

May 8, 2005; 12:15	Denmark	4–3 (1-3, 2-0, 1-0)	Austria	Olympiaworld, Innsbruck; Attendance: 5122

Game reference

Peter Hirsch
Michael Madsen
Goalies
Bernd Brückler
Referee:
(Czech Republic) Milan Minar

1:20 - Nielsen (Regin) (SH1)	1 - 0
	1 - 1	11:05 - P. Lakos (Ulrich)
	1 - 2	18:06 - Unterluggauer (Ulrich, Kalt) (PP1)
	1 - 3	18:39 - Robert Lukas (P. Lakos, Kaspitz)
32:02 - Grey (Smidt)	2 - 3
36:03 - Green (Damgaard)	3 - 3
47:41 - Nielsen (Akesson, Regin) (PP1)	4 - 3

12 min
Penalties
12 min
22
Shots
30

May 9, 2005; 12:15	Slovenia	1–9 (0-3, 0-5, 1-1)	Germany	Olympiaworld, Innsbruck; Attendance: 2177

Game reference

Gaber Glavič
Andrej Hočevar
Goalies
Robert Müller
Referee:
(Czech Republic) Milan Minar

	0 - 1	3:35 - Goc (SH1)
	0 - 2	10:33 - Kreutzer (Schubert, Benda) (PP1)
	0 - 3	19:32 - Hecht (Schubert) (PP1)
	0 - 4	27:06 - Benda (Hecht)
	0 - 5	27:59 - Furchner (PP1)
	0 - 6	28:46 - Hecht (Benda)
	0 - 7	30:58 - Boos (Lewandowski, Retzer)(PP1)
	0 - 8	33:31 - Goc (Kreutzer)
	0 - 9	48:26 - Martinec (Ehrhoff, Schubert)
49:08 - Kontrec (Goličič)	1 - 9

14 min
Penalties
12 min
20
Shots
52

May 10, 2005; 12:15	Germany	2–3 (1-1, 1-1, 0-1)	Denmark	Olympiaworld, Innsbruck; Attendance: 2335

Game reference

Robert Müller
Goalies
Peter Hirsch
Referee:
(Russia) Vyacheslav Bulanov

3:16 - Hecht (Schubert, Benda) (PP1)	1 - 0
	1 - 1	14:00 - Andreasen (Andersen, Green) (PP1)
25:44 - Boos (Schuaer, Furchner)	2 - 1
	2 - 2	36:08 - Grey (Schioldan)
	2 - 3	49:28 - K. Degn (Damgaard)

14 min
Penalties
14 min
38
Shots
22

May 11, 2005; 20:15	Austria	2–6 (1-0, 0-3, 1-3)	Slovenia	Olympiaworld, Innsbruck; Attendance: 2827

Game reference

Bernd Brückler
Jurgen Penker
Goalies
Gaber Glavič
Referee:
(Russia) Vyacheslav Bulanov

4:06 - Kaspitz (Peintner)	1 - 0
	1 - 1	25:14 - Jan (Terglav, Kontrec) (PP1)
	1 - 2	34:05 - Rodman (Razingar, Ciglenečki)
	1 - 3	36:48 - Razingar (Rodman, Glavič)
41:07 - Unterluggauer (Pöck, Trattnig)	2 - 3
	2 - 4	45:52 - Jan (Kontrec)
	2 - 5	49:25 - Jan (Kontrec, Terglav)
	2 - 6	51:41 - Dervarič (Terglav, Kontrec) (PP1)

32 min
Penalties
18 min
38
Shots
21

== Playoff round ==
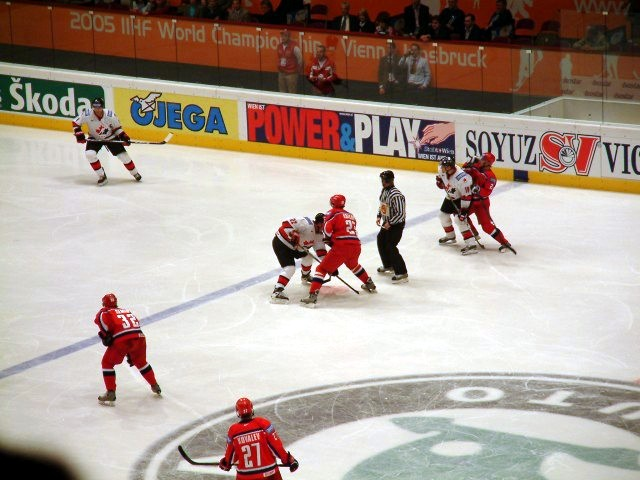
Russia against Canada

=== Bracket ===
Quarterfinals
F1	Sweden	2
E4	Switzerland	1
E2	Czech Republic	3
F3	United States	2
F2	Canada	5
E3	Slovakia	4
E1	Russia	4
F4	Finland	3

Semifinals
QF1	Sweden	2
QF2	Czech Republic	3
QF3	Canada	4
QF4	Russia	3

Finals
SF1	Czech Republic	3
SF2	Canada	0
Bronze medal game
SF2	Russia	6
SF1	Sweden	3

=== Quarter-finals ===
May 12, 2005; 16:15	Czech Republic	3–2 (GWS) (0–1, 0–1, 2–0, 0–0, 1–0)	United States	Wiener Stadthalle, Vienna; Attendance: 7,700

Game reference

Tomáš Vokoun
Goalies
Rick DiPietro
Referee:
(Canada) Rob Matsuoka

	0 – 1	9:18 - M. Modano (E. Cole, B. Hauer)
	0 – 2	25:47 - M. Parrish (Z. Parise, B. Hauer) (PP1)
41:40 - M. Židlický (D. Výborný)	1 – 2
49:50 - J. Špaček (A. Hemský)	2 – 2
70:00 - M. Ručinský (GWS)	3 – 2

16 min
Penalties
12 min
53
Shots
27

May 12, 2005; 16:15	Canada	5–4 (2–2, 1–1, 2–1)	Slovakia	Olympiaworld, Innsbruck; Attendance: 5300

Game reference

Martin Brodeur
Goalies
Ján Lašák
Referee:
(Sweden) Thomas Andersson

	0 – 1	0:45 - M. Gáborík (Ž. Pálffy, Ľ. Višňovský)
5:52 - D. Heatley (M. Fisher) (PP1)	1 – 1
	1 – 2	8:22 - M. Handzuš (Ľ. Bartečko, J. Lašák)
16:47 - R. Smyth (D. Heatley, P. Marleau) (PP1)	2 – 2
24:21 - S. Gagné (R. Nash)	3 – 2
	3 – 3	34:08 - P. Demitra (M. Štrbák, Ľ. Višňovský) (PP2)
	3 – 4	43:46 - P. Demitra (M. Hossa) (SH1)
48:15 - S. Gagné (R. Nash, J. Thornton)	4 – 4
55:38 - J. Thornton (R. Nash, S. Gagné)	5 – 4

14 min
Penalties
28 min
33
Shots
25

May 12, 2005; 20:15	Russia	4–3 (GWS) (2–3, 1–0, 0–0, 0–0, 1–0)	Finland	Wiener Stadthalle, Vienna; Attendance: 7,530

Game reference

Maxim Sokolov
Goalies
Niklas Bäckström
Referee:
(Canada) Brent Reiber

	0 – 1	7:34 - P. Pakaslahti (J. Karalahti, J. Rita)
	0 – 2	12:13 - J. Hentunen (PP1)
16:03 - A. Ovechkin (M. Afinogenov, A. Ryazantsev)	1 – 2
17:45 - S. Gusev (A. Kovalev) (PP1)	2 – 2
	2 – 3	18:52 - K. Timonen (O. Jokinen, V. Peltonen) (PP1)
31:04 - P. Datsyuk (SH1)	3 – 3
70:00 - M. Afinogenov (GWS)	4 – 3

18 min
Penalties
12 min
43
Shots
27

May 12, 2005; 20:15	Sweden	2–1 (1–1, 1–0, 0–0)	Switzerland	Olympiaworld, Innsbruck; Attendance: 5,103

Game reference

Henrik Lundqvist
Goalies
Martin Gerber
Referee:
(Czech Republic) Milan Minář

	0 – 1	1:20 - M. Plüss (I. Rüthemann, M. Streit) (PP1)
6:45 - N. Kronwall (J. Hedström, H. Zetterberg)	1 – 1
24:43 - D. Sedin (N. Kronwall, J. Jönsson)	2 – 1

22 min
Penalties
14 min
36
Shots
20

=== Semi-finals ===
May 14, 2005; 16:15	Russia	3–4 (0–3, 2–1, 1–0)	Canada	Wiener Stadthalle, Vienna; Attendance: 7,500

Game reference

Maxim Sokolov
Goalies
Martin Brodeur
Referee:
(Finland) Hannu Henriksson

	0 – 1	1:38 - W. Redden (J. Thornton)
	0 – 2	5:46 - S. Souray (J. Thornton, S. Gagné)
	0 – 3	10:37 - D. Heatley (S. Doan, D. Boyle) (PP2)
	0 – 4	21:40 - E. Jovanovski (R. Nash, J. Thornton) (PP1)
34:22 - A. Semin (A. Yashin)	1 - 4
39:18 - A. Yashin	2 - 4
46:27 - A. Ovechkin (F. Fedorov, E. Malkin)	3 - 4

34 min
Penalties
10 min
42
Shots
25

May 14, 2005; 20:15	Sweden	2–3; OT (0–0, 1–1, 1–1, 0–1)	Czech Republic	Wiener Stadthalle, Vienna; Attendance: 7791

Game reference

Henrik Lundqvist
Goalies
Tomáš Vokoun
Referee:
(United States) Rick Looker

31:39 - J. Höglund (M. Norström)	1 – 0
	1 – 1	35:03 - P. Čajánek (P. Sýkora)
	1 – 2	45:16 - M. Straka (V. Prospal)
52:03 - D. Sedin (H. Sedin) (PP1)	2 – 2
	2 – 3	64:43 - R. Dvořák (M. Židlický)

12 min
Penalties
14 min
34
Shots
31

=== Bronze medal game ===
May 15, 2005; 16:15	Sweden	3–6 (2–3, 0–3, 1–0)	Russia	Wiener Stadthalle, Vienna; Attendance: 7889

Game reference

Henrik Lundqvist
Johan Holmqvist
Goalies
Maxim Sokolov
Referee:
(Canada) Brent Reiber

	0 – 1	1:02 - M. Afinogenov (A. Ovechkin, E. Malkin)
	0 – 2	3:58 - M. Afinogenov (A. Ovechkin)
8:11 - R. Sundin (H. Sedin) (PP1)	1 – 2
	1 – 3	15:24 - A. Kovalev (P. Datsyuk, A. Markov)
19:13 - H. Zetterberg (M. Johansson, J. Hedström)	2 – 3
	2 – 4	21:33 - A. Ovechkin (A. Ryazantsev, E. Malkin)
	2 – 5	25:57 - A. Yashin
	2 – 6	28:43 - A. Semin (M. Afinogenov)
42:46 - H. Sedin (M. Samuelsson, D. Sedin)	3 – 6

12 min
Penalties
12 min
23
Shots
32

=== Gold medal game ===
May 15, 2005; 20:15	Czech Republic	3–0 (1–0, 0–0, 2–0)	Canada	Wiener Stadthalle, Vienna; Attendance: 7999

Game reference

Tomáš Vokoun
Goalies
Martin Brodeur
Referee:
(Sweden) Thomas Andersson

4:13 - V. Prospal (M. Ručinský, J. Jágr)	1 – 0
43:12 - M. Ručinský (J. Jágr, P. Čajánek)	2 – 0
59:07 - J. Vašíček (EN)	3 – 0

20 min
Penalties
30 min
27
Shots
29

== Ranking and statistics ==
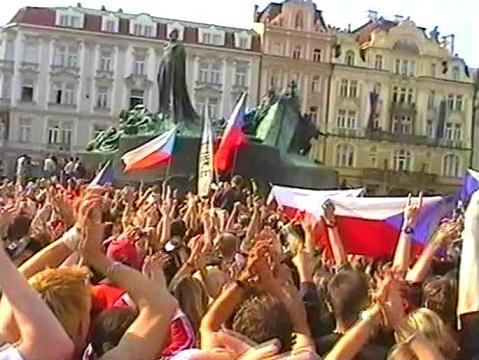
Czech gold medal festival in Prague

2005 IIHF World Championship winners

Czech Republic
5th/11th title

=== Tournament Awards ===
- Best players selected by the directorate:
  - Best Goaltender: (Czech Republic) Tomáš Vokoun
  - Best Defenceman: (Canada) Wade Redden
  - Best Forward: (Russia) Alexei Kovalev
  - Most Valuable Player: (Canada) Joe Thornton
- Media All-Star Team:
  - Goaltender: (Czech Republic) Tomáš Vokoun
  - Defence: (Sweden) Niklas Kronwall, (Czech Republic) Marek Židlický
  - Forwards: (Czech Republic) Jaromír Jágr, (Canada) Rick Nash, (Canada) Joe Thornton

=== Final standings ===
The final standings of the tournament according to IIHF:

1st place, gold medalist(s)	Czech Republic
2nd place, silver medalist(s)	Canada
3rd place, bronze medalist(s)	Russia
4	Sweden
5	Slovakia
6	United States
7	Finland
8	Switzerland
9	Latvia
10	Belarus
11	Ukraine
12	Kazakhstan
13	Slovenia
14	Denmark
15	Germany
16	Austria

=== Scoring leaders ===
List shows the top skaters sorted by points, then goals. If the list exceeds 10 skaters because of a tie in points, all of the tied skaters are left out.

Player	GP	G	A	Pts	+/−	PIM	POS
(Canada) Joe Thornton	9	6	10	16	+7	4	F
(Canada) Rick Nash	9	9	6	15	+7	8	F
(Canada) Simon Gagné	9	3	7	10	+7	0	F
(Slovakia) Žigmund Pálffy	7	5	4	9	+1	10	F
(Sweden) Daniel Sedin	9	5	4	9	+4	2	F
(Sweden) Daniel Alfredsson	9	3	6	9	+6	6	F
(Czech Republic) Jaromír Jágr	8	2	7	9	+4	5	F
(Russia) Alexander Ovechkin	8	5	3	8	+7	4	F
(Slovakia) Ľubomír Višňovský	7	2	6	8	+2	0	D
(Czech Republic) Václav Prospal	9	2	6	8	+4	4	F

=== Leading goaltenders ===
Only the top five goaltenders, based on save percentage, who have played 40% of their team's minutes are included in this list.

Player	MIP	SOG	GA	GAA	SVS%	SO
(Belarus) Andrei Mezin	297:24	175	5	1.01	97.14	2
(Czech Republic) Tomáš Vokoun	499:17	190	9	1.08	95.26	2
(Kazakhstan) Vitaliy Kolesnik	279:20	168	8	1.72	95.24	0
(Switzerland) Martin Gerber	359:17	186	10	1.67	94.62	1
(Latvia) Artūrs Irbe	283:03	124	7	1.48	94.35	2

== IIHF honors and awards ==
The 2005 IIHF Hall of Fame induction ceremony has held in Vienna during the World Championships. Rita Hrbacek of Austria was given the Paul Loicq Award for outstanding contributions to international ice hockey.

IIHF Hall of Fame inductees

- Quido Adamec, Czech Republic
- Viacheslav Fetisov, Russia
- Jørgen Hviid, Denmark
- Viktor Kuzkin, Russia
- Mats Näslund, Sweden
- Alois Schloder, Germany

== See also ==
- 2005 in ice hockey
- 2005 IIHF World U18 Championships
- 2005 World Junior Ice Hockey Championships
