= Goličič =

Goličič is a Slovenian surname. Notable people with the surname include:

- Boštjan Goličič (born 1989), Slovenian ice hockey player
- Jurij Goličič (born 1981), Slovenian ice hockey player
