= Philippine National Bobsled Luge and Skeleton Association =

National sports association

- Sport: Bobsleigh; luge; skeleton
- Jurisdiction: Philippines
- Abbreviation: PNBSLA
- Founded: 2017
- Affiliation: IBSF
- Affiliation date: 2020
- Headquarters: Baguio, Benguet
- President: Thelmo Cunanan Jr.
- Secretary: Norman Camungol
- (Philippines)

The Philippine National Bobsled Luge and Skeleton Association, Inc. (PNBSLA) is the national sports association for sliding sports in the Philippines including bobsled, luge, and skeleton.

== History ==
The Philippine National Bobsled Luge and Skeleton Association (PNBSLA) was established in 2017 with Thelmo Cunanan Jr. as the inaugural president. The first two-man bobsled team consisted of Philippine Coast Guard (PCG) personnel, Rolando Isidro and Jeffrey de la Cruz trained for four months within the same year with the help of OlympiaWorld Innsbruck. They took part at the IBSF Europa Cup as a guest team in January 2018.

Members of the Philippine bobsleigh team are typically enlisted personnel of the PCG.

Sometime in 2018, the PNBSLA bobsleigh team moved from Austria to Calgary, Canada. At the March 2 Alberta Cup Provincial Championship, a two-man team of Isidro and Jerby Deriada finished third.

In 2020, the PNBSLA joined the International Bobsleigh and Skeleton Federation.

The men's and women's bobsleigh teams took part at the 2025 Korea Cup Bobsled Championship. The pair of Rhea Joy Sumalpong and Shirley Salamagos won the women's competition silver medal.

The PNBSLA are set to begin participating in the IBSF Development Camp for Emerging Nations at the IBSF North American Cup in March 2026.

== Honors ==
Alberta Cup Provincial Championship
(bronze) Third place (March 2018; men's) – Rolando Isidro and Jerby Deriada

Korea Cup Bobsled Championship
(silver) Second place (2025; women's) – Rhea Joy Sumalpong and Shirley Salamagos
