= Retzer =

Retzer is a surname. Notable people with the surname include:

- George Retzer (1883–1979), American wrestler
- Ken Retzer (1934–2020), American baseball player
- Michael Retzer (born 1946), American politician and diplomat
- Otto Retzer (born 1945), Austrian actor, producer and director
- Raoul Retzer (1919–1974), Austrian actor
- Stephan Retzer (born 1976), German ice hockey player
