= Žagar =

Žagar may refer to:

- Žagar (band)
- Žagar (surname)
