= Vladimir Tsyplakov =

Belarusian ice hockey player (1969–2019)

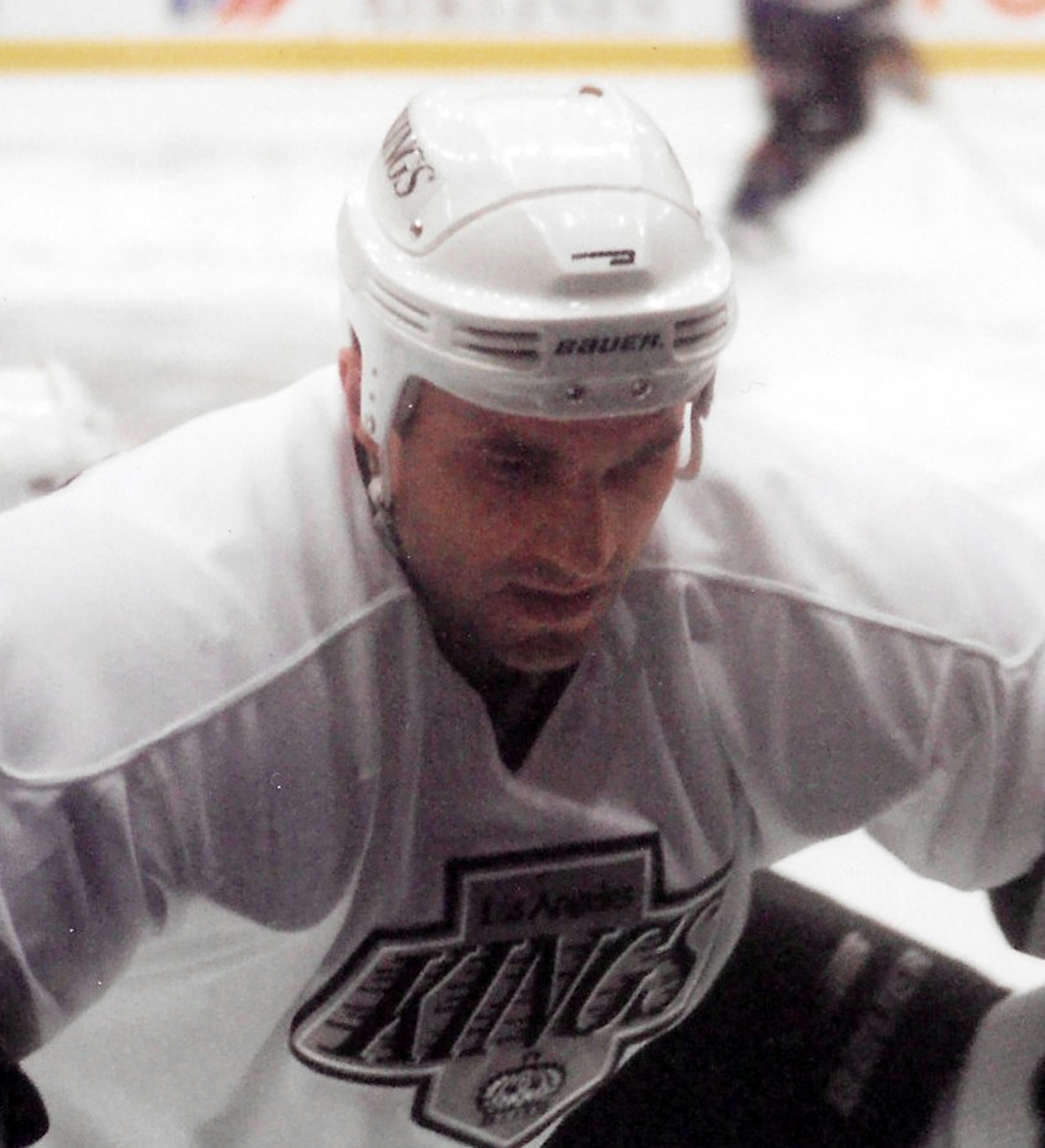
- Tsyplakov stretching before a Los Angeles Kings game
- Born: 18 April 1969 Inta, Soviet Union
- Died: 14 December 2019 (aged 50)
- Height: 6 ft 2 in (188 cm)
- Weight: 203 lb (92 kg; 14 st 7 lb)
- Position: Left wing
- Shot: Left
- Played for: Los Angeles Kings; Buffalo Sabres
- National team: Belarus
- NHL draft: 59th overall, 1995; Los Angeles Kings
- Playing career: 1988–2005

Vladimir Viktorovich Tsyplakov (Belarusian: Уладзiмiр Віктаравіч Цыплакоў; 18 April 1969 – 14 December 2019) was a Belarusian professional ice hockey player winger. He was drafted in the third round, 59th overall, by the Los Angeles Kings in the 1995 NHL entry draft.

Tsyplakov was also an assistant coach with the Belarus men's national ice hockey team. He died at the age of 50 in 2019.

== Playing career ==
Tsyplakov played six seasons in the Soviet Union with Torpedo Yaroslavl and HC Dynamo Minsk. He played three seasons in the United States in the International Hockey League.

He made his National Hockey League debut with the Kings during the 1995–96 season and was on their roster until being traded to the Buffalo Sabres during the 1999–2000 season. After a season and a half with Buffalo, he returned to the Russian Superleague to play with AK Bars Kazan. Tsyplakov played for HC CSKA Moscow during the 2004–05 season.

During his NHL career Tsyplakov played in 331 games, recording 69 goals and 101 assists.

His elder brother Alexander also played the sport professionally and was selected for Belarus.

== Career statistics ==
=== Regular season and playoffs ===
			Regular season					Playoffs
Season	Team	League	GP	G	A	Pts	PIM	GP	G	A	Pts	PIM
1985–86	Torpedo Yaroslavl	URS.2	2	0	0	0	2	—	—	—	—	—
1986–87	Torpedo Yaroslavl	URS.2	25	3	1	4	6	—	—	—	—	—
1987–88	Dinamo Minsk	URS.2	47	7	3	10	12	—	—	—	—	—
1988–89	Dinamo Minsk	USSR	19	6	1	7	4	—	—	—	—	—
1989–90	Dinamo Minsk	USSR	47	11	6	17	20	—	—	—	—	—
1990–91	Dinamo Minsk	USSR	28	6	5	11	14	—	—	—	—	—
1991–92	Dinamo Minsk	CIS	29	10	9	19	16	—	—	—	—	—
1992–93	Detroit Falcons	CoHL	44	33	43	76	20	6	5	4	9	6
1992–93	Indianapolis Ice	IHL	11	6	7	13	4	5	1	1	2	2
1993–94	Fort Wayne Komets	IHL	63	31	32	63	51	14	6	8	14	16
1994–95	Fort Wayne Komets	IHL	79	38	40	78	39	4	2	4	6	2
1995–96	Los Angeles Kings	NHL	23	5	5	10	4	—	—	—	—	—
1995–96	Las Vegas Thunder	IHL	9	5	6	11	4	—	—	—	—	—
1996–97	Los Angeles Kings	NHL	67	16	23	39	12	—	—	—	—	—
1996–97	HC Pojišťovna IB Pardubice	ELH	29	3	1	4	8	—	—	—	—	—
1997–98	Los Angeles Kings	NHL	73	18	34	52	18	4	0	1	1	8
1998–99	Los Angeles Kings	NHL	69	11	12	23	32	—	—	—	—	—
1999–00	Los Angeles Kings	NHL	29	6	7	13	4	—	—	—	—	—
1999–00	Buffalo Sabres	NHL	34	6	13	19	10	5	0	1	1	4
2000–01	Buffalo Sabres	NHL	36	7	7	14	10	9	1	0	1	4
2001–02	Ak Bars Kazan	RSL	26	5	14	19	22	11	4	2	6	4
2002–03	Ak Bars Kazan	RSL	45	18	6	24	56	5	1	0	1	2
2003–04	Ak Bars Kazan	RSL	41	15	11	26	32	8	2	1	3	4
2004–05	CSKA Moscow	RSL	40	6	10	16	47	—	—	—	—	—
2004–05	Yunost Minsk	BLR	—	—	—	—	—	7	3	2	5	6
USSR/CIS totals			123	33	21	54	54	—	—	—	—	—
NHL totals			331	69	101	170	90	18	1	2	3	16
RSL totals			152	44	41	85	157	24	7	3	10	10

=== International ===
Year	Team	Event	GP	G	A	Pts	PIM
1989	Soviet Union	WJC	7	1	0	1	8
1998	Belarus	OG	5	1	1	2	2
1999	Belarus	WC	6	2	2	4	2
2000	Belarus	WC	5	3	2	5	4
2002	Belarus	OG	8	1	3	4	4
2002	Belarus	WC D1	5	9	9	18	4
2003	Belarus	WC	6	3	1	4	2
2004	Belarus	WC D1	5	5	2	7	0
2005	Belarus	WC	6	0	4	4	2
Senior totals			46	24	24	48	20
