= Žagar (surname) =

Žagar is a Slovenian and Croatian surname. It is an occupational surname, a Slavicized version of German word Säger meaning sawyer. It is the 24th most popular surname in Slovenia, and is borne by 2,805 individuals. In Croatia, it is borne by 1,619 individuals, and it is traditionally found in Gorski Kotar and Međimurje, and was first mentioned in 1570 in Čabar, where it is also one of the most numerous surnames today. Ethnographically, it is autochthonously Carniolan.

Notable people with the name include:

- Luka Žagar, Slovenian ice hockey player
- Matej Žagar, Slovenian motorcycle rider
- Teo Žagar, Slovenian-American filmmaker
- Tadej Žagar-Knez, Slovenian footballer

== See also ==
- Žagars, Latvian surname
- Zagar (disambiguation)

== Sources ==
- Frančić, A. (1993). "Međimurska prezimena motivirana zanimanjem". Folia Onomastica Croatica. 2: 67–78.
- "Prezimena u župi Viduševac" (PDF), Matica Glinska, vol. 14, Grad Glina
- Malnar, Slavko (2001). Prezimena u čabarskom kraju kroz stoljeća, 1498-1997. Čabar: Matica hrvatska Čabar.
- Šarić, Marko (2009). "Predmoderne etnije u Lici i Krbavi prema popisu iz 1712./14.". In Željko Holjevac (ed.). Identitet Like: Korijeni i razvitak (PDF) (in Croatian). Vol. 1. Zagreb: Institut društvenih znanosti Ivo Pilar. ISBN 978-953-6666-65-2.
- "ŽAGAR". Imena. Statistični urad Republike Slovenije. 2017.
