= Eduard Lewandowski =

Russian-born German ice hockey player

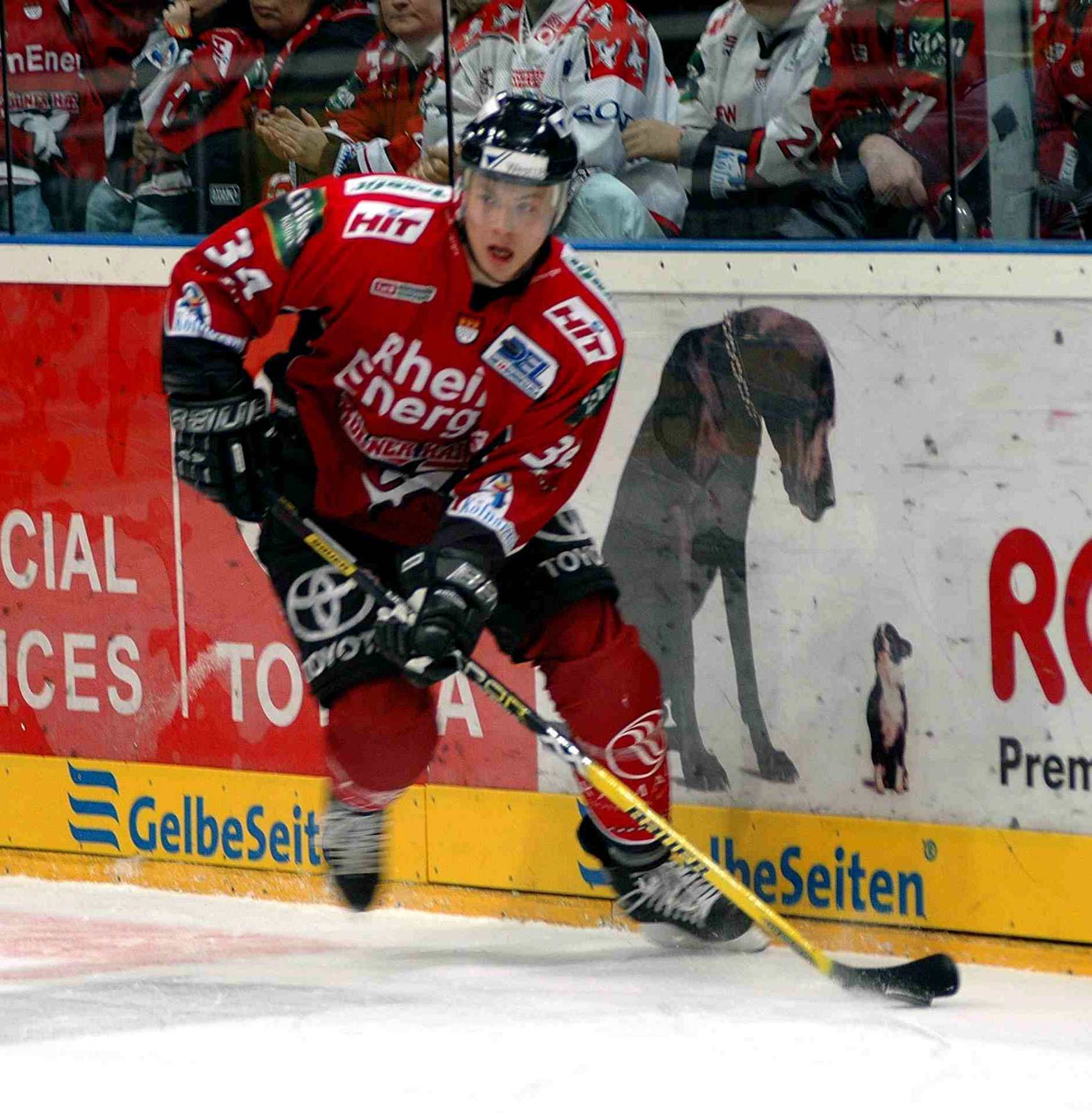
- Born: September 7, 1980 (age 45) Krasnoturyinsk, Russian SFSR, URS
- Height: 6 ft 1 in (185 cm)
- Weight: 207 lb (94 kg; 14 st 11 lb)
- Position: Right wing
- Shot: Left
- Played for: Löwen Frankfurt; Kölner Haie; Eisbären Berlin; Adler Mannheim; Spartak Moscow; Neftekhimik Nizhnekamsk; Atlant Moscow Oblast; Avtomobilist Yekaterinburg; Düsseldorfer EG
- National team: Germany
- NHL draft: 242nd overall, 2003; Phoenix Coyotes
- Playing career: 1997–2023

Eduard Voldemarovich Lewandowski (born September 7, 1980) is a Russian-born German former ice hockey forward.

== Playing career ==
Lewandowski was drafted 242nd overall in the 8th round of the 2003 NHL entry draft by the Phoenix Coyotes. He never played in the North American leagues, instead plying his trade in his native Germany before moving to Russia to play in the Kontinental Hockey League in the prime of his career.

On May 29, 2013, Lewandowski moved to his fourth KHL club, in agreeing to a contract as a free agent with Avtomobilist Yekaterinburg.

After two seasons with Avtomobilist and seven years in Russia, Lewandowski opted to return to Germany as a free agent, signing a two-year contract with Düsseldorfer EG of the DEL on May 15, 2015.

== Career statistics ==
=== Regular season and playoffs ===
			Regular season					Playoffs
Season	Team	League	GP	G	A	Pts	PIM	GP	G	A	Pts	PIM
1997–98	EC Wilhelmshaven–Stickhausen	GER.2	48	19	12	31	46	—	—	—	—	—
1998–99	EC Wilhelmshaven–Stickhausen	GER.3	49	35	21	56	96	—	—	—	—	—
1999–2000	EC Wilhelmshaven–Stickhausen	GER.2	48	15	26	41	104	—	—	—	—	—
2000–01	EC Wilhelmshaven–Stickhausen	GER.2	42	21	28	49	87	5	1	3	4	8
2000–01	Kölner Haie	DEL	11	0	0	0	0	—	—	—	—	—
2001–02	Eisbären Berlin	DEL	59	7	15	22	57	4	0	0	0	2
2002–03	Kölner Haie	DEL	46	6	14	20	46	13	3	3	6	43
2003–04	Kölner Haie	DEL	52	16	17	33	85	5	1	2	3	16
2004–05	Kölner Haie	DEL	49	19	20	39	49	6	1	1	2	33
2005–06	Kölner Haie	DEL	52	20	26	46	48	9	3	5	8	31
2006–07	Adler Mannheim	DEL	51	13	26	39	26	11	2	9	11	12
2007–08	Adler Mannheim	DEL	55	16	24	40	32	5	1	3	4	4
2008–09	Spartak Moskva	KHL	49	10	18	28	38	6	0	1	1	6
2009–10	Spartak Moskva	KHL	44	10	17	27	52	—	—	—	—	—
2009–10	Neftekhimik Nizhnekamsk	KHL	11	3	2	5	6	9	0	0	0	4
2010–11	Atlant Mytishchi	KHL	54	6	6	12	54	24	4	5	9	4
2011–12	Atlant Mytishchi	KHL	54	7	10	17	26	12	1	1	2	2
2012–13	Spartak Moskva	KHL	30	5	3	8	10	—	—	—	—	—
2012–13	Neftekhimik Nizhnekamsk	KHL	10	0	0	0	10	4	0	1	1	0
2013–14	Avtomobilist Yekaterinburg	KHL	53	7	4	11	26	4	0	1	1	2
2014–15	Avtomobilist Yekaterinburg	KHL	60	2	14	16	57	5	1	0	1	2
2015–16	Düsseldorfer EG	DEL	52	17	10	27	18	5	1	1	2	2
2016–17	Düsseldorfer EG	DEL	48	8	16	24	24	—	—	—	—	—
2017–18	Düsseldorfer EG	DEL	51	9	12	21	16	—	—	—	—	—
2018–19	Löwen Frankfurt	GER.2	48	16	40	56	18	15	6	3	9	10
2019–20	Löwen Frankfurt	GER.2	51	24	26	50	18	—	—	—	—	—
2020–21	Löwen Frankfurt	GER.2	43	5	14	19	24	5	0	0	0	0
2021–22	ECW Sande	GER.4	51	24	26	50	18	—	—	—	—	—
2021–22	Krefeld Pinguine	DEL	40	6	6	12	10	—	—	—	—	—
DEL totals			566	137	186	323	411	58	12	24	36	143
KHL totals			365	50	74	124	279	64	6	9	15	20

=== International ===
Year	Team	Event	GP	G	A	Pts	PIM
2002	Germany	WC	7	0	1	1	2
2003	Germany	WC	7	0	3	3	2
2004	Germany	WC	6	1	0	1	4
2004	Germany	WCH	4	0	1	1	4
2005	Germany	WC	6	0	3	3	2
2006	Germany	OG	5	0	2	2	0
Senior totals			35	1	10	11	14
