= Olympiahalle (Innsbruck) =

Arena in Innsbruck, Tyrol, Austria

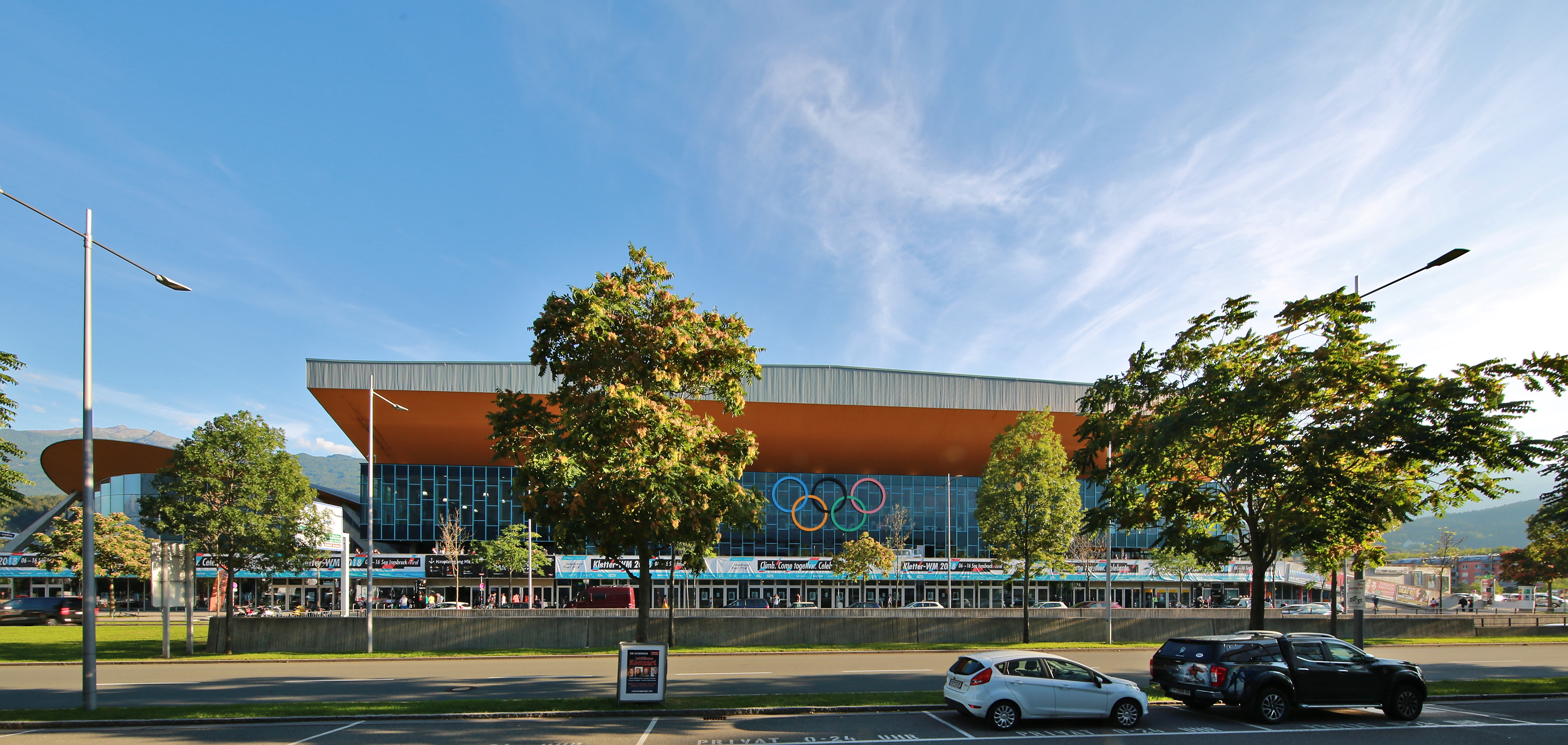
- Olympiahalle in September 2018
- Interactive map of Olympiahalle
- Location: Innsbruck, Austria
- Coordinates: 47.25778°N 11.40965°E
- Operator: OlympiaWorld Innsbruck
- Capacity: 8,000 (seated in grandstands); 12,000 (with floor standing)

Construction
- Groundbreaking: 17 March 1961
- Built: 1961–1963
- Opened: 9 November 1963
- Renovated: 1976, 2001–2004
- Expanded: 2005 (Tyrolean Ice Arena)
- Architects: Hans Buchrainer; Renovation: Michael Volz and Wolfgang Rang

Tenant
- HC TWK Innsbruck (1994–2005; since 2005, only selected games)

Olympiahalle (Olympic Hall) is an multi-purpose indoor sports venue located in Innsbruck, Austria. The arena is located in the south of the city, close to the Tivoli Stadion Tirol; both of which are part of the multi-functional sports complex OlympiaWorld Innsbruck.

The arena, designed by architect Hans Buchrainer, was opened in November 1963 and underwent a further renovation between 2001 and 2004. It can accommodate 8,000 spectators in the grandstands and, depending on the event, up to 4,000 spectators on the playing field. There is also a multi-purpose hall, nine catering kiosks, a sports bar with space for around 200 people, two car parks with a total of 1,000 spaces and an outdoor artificial ice rink.

== History ==
=== Construction ===
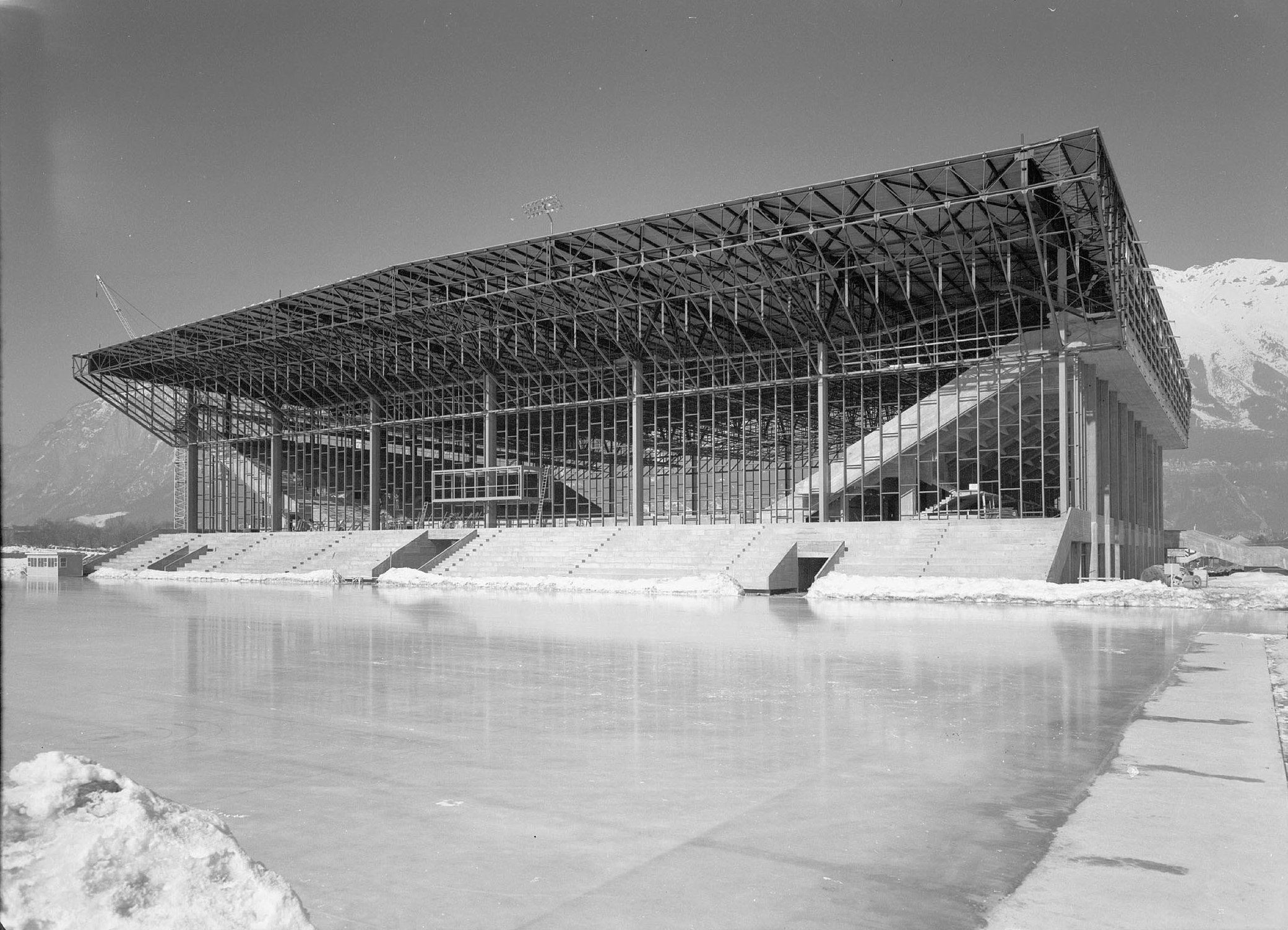
The arena during construction (1963)

Development of the land to the south of Pradl in Innsbruck began in 1922 with the construction of a sports facility with grandstands. Previously, the site was occupied by meadows and the Tivoli Inn, which gave the area its name.

The site south of Tivoli was chosen for the construction of a new indoor ice rink to host the figure skating and ice hockey events at the 1964 Winter Olympics. An architectural competition was held, and Lienz architect Hans Buchrainer emerged as the winner. Groundbreaking for the new artificial ice stadium took place on 17 March 1961. After 28 months of construction, the venue opened on 9 November 1963. At the time of opening, it was one of the largest ice sports facilities in Europe, with seating for around 11,000 spectators. The speed skating venue for the Games, also made of artificial ice, was installed outside the venue.

=== Renovations ===
Renovation work on the Olympic Hall and the construction of a new 400-meter outdoor speed skating rink were undertaken for the 1976 Winter Olympics. The Olympiahalle was given a complete facelift in the early 2000s to maximize the seating capacity and comply with international standards for hosting the Winter World University Games and the Ice Hockey World Championships both in 2005.

== Events ==
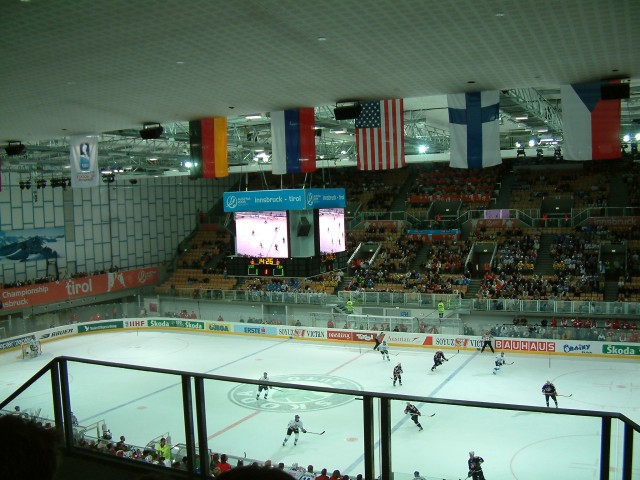
2005 IIHF World Championship

During the 1964 Winter Olympics, it hosted the figure skating and ice hockey events. Twelve years later, at the 1976 Winter Olympics, it again hosted figure skating and ice hockey. The hall received Olympic honors for a third time in 2012, when competitions in figure skating and short track speed skating at the first Winter Youth Olympic Games were held in the arena.

For the 2005 IIHF World Championship, it was renovated and the complex expanded to include a new smaller ice rink. The capacity at the time of the Championship was approximately 7,800 spectators, and approximately 3,200 in the smaller hall, the Tyrolean Ice Arena next door. The smaller hall hosts the HC TWK Innsbruck for the majority of its home games. The Olympiahalle is now used sparingly, specially to cater for larger crowds on important rival or playoff games.

Other major sporting championships it has hosted include the 2010 European Men's Handball Championship and, a year later, the 2011 Men's European Volleyball Championship. The Olympiahalle also hosted the 2024 European Women's Handball Championship.

In 2015 and 2026, Innsbruck unsuccessfully bid to host the Eurovision Song Contest with the Olympiahalle as the proposed venue.

== Concerts ==
The Olympiahalle is also used as a concert arena. Over the years, many national and international artists and groups have performed there. Top acts that have performed in the Olympic Hall since 1964 have included: Rolling Stones, Tina Turner, Cher, Dire Straits, Joe Cocker, Nena, Falco, Simply Red, Sting, Rainhard Fendrich, Pink, Marilyn Manson, Iron Maiden, Wolfgang Ambros, Lenny Kravitz, Gianna Nannini, Supertramp, amongst others.

== See also ==
- OlympiaWorld Innsbruck
- List of indoor arenas in Austria
