= Konstantin Koltsov =

Belarusian ice hockey player (1981–2024)

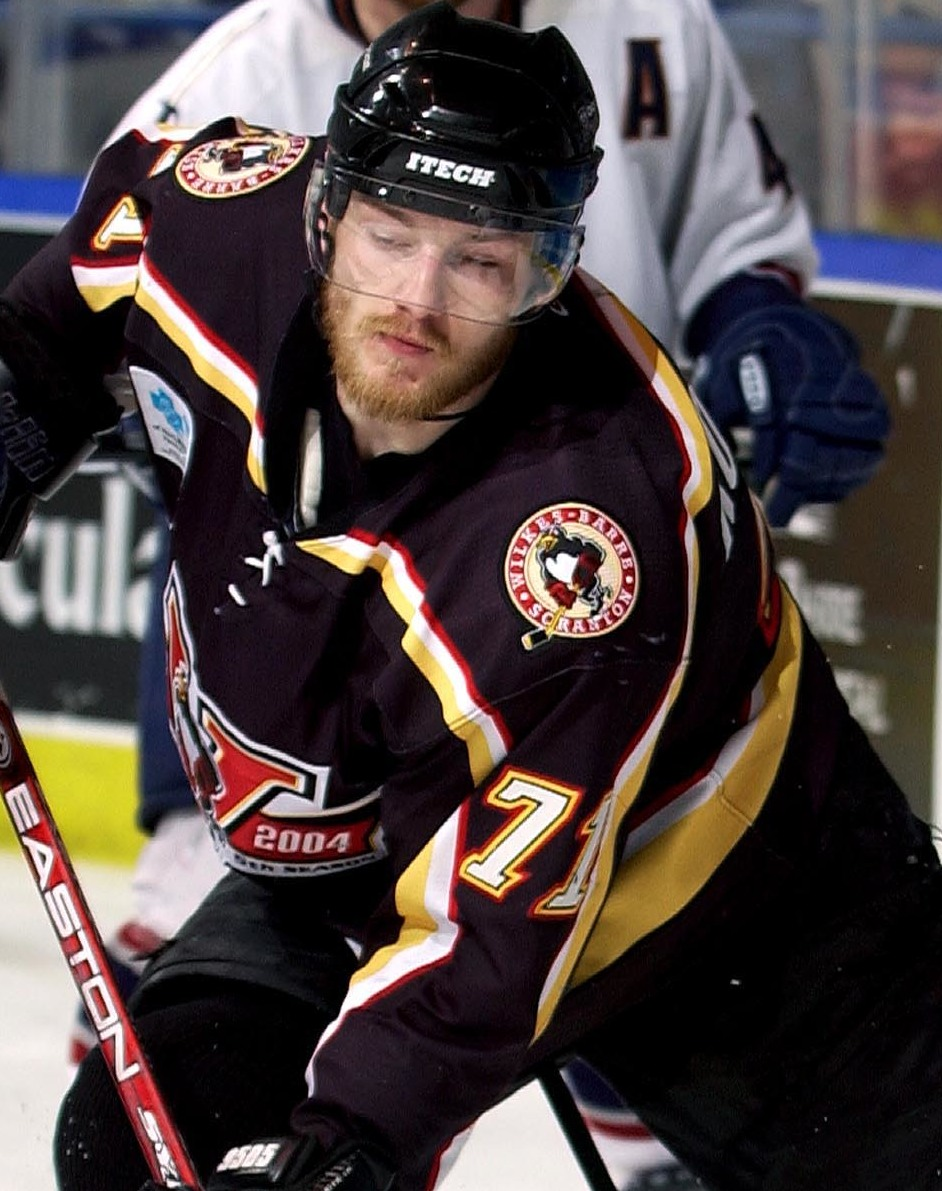
- Koltsov with the Wilkes-Barre/Scranton Penguins in 2004
- Born: April 17, 1981 Minsk, Byelorussian SSR, Soviet Union
- Died: March 18, 2024 (aged 42) Bal Harbour, Florida, U.S.
- Height: 6 ft 0 in (183 cm)
- Weight: 190 lb (86 kg; 13 st 8 lb)
- Position: Right wing
- Shot: Left
- Played for: Severstal Cherepovets; Yunost Minsk; Metallurg Novokuznetsk; Ak Bars Kazan; Spartak Moscow; Pittsburgh Penguins; Dinamo Minsk; Salavat Yulaev Ufa; Atlant Moscow Oblast
- National team: Belarus
- NHL draft: 18th overall, 1999; Pittsburgh Penguins
- Playing career: 1998–2016

Konstantin Yevgeniyevich Koltsov (Belarusian: Канстанцін Яўгенавіч Кальцоў, romanized: Kanstancin Jaŭhienavič Kaĺcoŭ; April 17, 1981 – March 18, 2024) was a Belarusian professional ice hockey player. He played parts of three seasons with the Pittsburgh Penguins of the National Hockey League (NHL) between 2002 and 2006. Internationally, Koltsov played for the Belarusian national team at the 2002 and 2010 Winter Olympics and at nine World Championships. He served as an assistant coach for Salavat Yulaev Ufa in the Kontinental Hockey League as well as head coach for the Belarusian national team.

== Early life ==
Koltsov was born on April 17, 1981, in Minsk, Byelorussian SSR, USSR (present-day Belarus) to Eugene and Galya Koltsov. He was raised there and at an early age pursued a dream to become a professional hockey player.

== Playing career ==
Koltsov started playing for Junactva Minsk in the Belarusian 1st division during the 1997–98 season and moved to the Russian team Severstal Cherepovets for the next season. Due to his speed and stick handling, he was often referred to as the "Russian Rocket II" because of his similar playing style to that of Russian great Pavel Bure.

Koltsov was drafted to the NHL in the 1999 NHL entry draft as the Pittsburgh Penguins' first-round pick, 18th overall. He played for the Wilkes-Barre/Scranton Penguins in the AHL in the 2002–03 season and started playing full-time for the Pittsburgh Penguins in the 2003–04 season, playing 82 games and scoring nine goals and 20 assists.

During the 2004–05 NHL lockout, Koltsov played for the Spartak Moscow hockey team, scoring six goals in 31 games.

The following season, Koltsov moved between Wilkes-Barre and Pittsburgh until January, after which he stayed in the NHL until the end of the season, finishing with three goals and six assists. As a result of the Penguins not extending a qualifying offer, Koltsov became an unrestricted free agent on July 1, 2006. In August 2006, he returned to Russia, signing to play for Salavat Yulaev Ufa of the Russian Super League.

During the 2007–08 RSL season, Koltsov was part of a Salavat Yulaev Ufa squad that defeated Lokomotiv Yaroslavl to capture the RSL league title. With the absorption of the RSL into the newly formed Kontinental Hockey League at the start of the 2008–09 season, Salavat Yulaev Ufa would become the last standing RSL champion. With Salavat Yulaev Ufa, Koltsov won the Gagarin Cup throughout the 2010–11 season.

On November 27, 2016, Koltsov retired from professional hockey after competing for 18 seasons. He became an assistant for the Belarusian men's hockey team and also worked as the assistant coach of Salavat Yulaev Ufa, where he served for two seasons prior to his death.

== International play ==
Internationally, Koltsov played on the Belarus national team in the Winter Olympics and IIHF World Championships.

== Personal life and death ==
Koltsov had three children with his former wife, Julia. They divorced in 2020. He began publicly dating Belarusian tennis player Aryna Sabalenka in June 2021. Koltsov and Sabalenka were separated at the time of his death.

Koltsov's former club Salavat Yulaev announced his death on March 18, 2024. He was 42. The Miami-Dade Police Department said it was an apparent suicide and that Koltsov had jumped from a balcony at The St. Regis Bal Harbour.

== Career statistics ==
=== Regular season and playoffs ===
			Regular season					Playoffs
Season	Team	League	GP	G	A	Pts	PIM	GP	G	A	Pts	PIM	Ref.
1997–98	Severstal Cherepovets	RSL	2	0	0	0	2	4	1	0	1	0
1997–98	Severstal–2 Cherepovets	RUS.3	44	11	12	23	16	—	—	—	—	—
1998–99	Severstal Cherepovets	RSL	33	3	0	3	8	1	0	0	0	2
1998–99	Severstal–2 Cherepovets	RUS.3	2	0	1	1	2	—	—	—	—	—
1998–99	Yunost Minsk	BLR	4	1	4	5	2	—	—	—	—	—
1998–99	Yunost Minsk	EEHL	5	3	4	7	2	—	—	—	—	—
1999–2000	Metallurg Novokuznetsk	RSL	31	3	4	7	12	11	1	1	2	6
2000–01	Ak Bars Kazan	RSL	24	7	8	15	10	2	0	0	0	4
2001–02	Ak Bars Kazan	RSL	10	1	2	3	2	—	—	—	—	—
2001–02	Spartak Moscow	RSL	22	1	0	1	12	—	—	—	—	—
2001–02	Spartak–2 Moscow	RUS.3	2	0	1	1	0	—	—	—	—	—
2002–03	Wilkes-Barre/Scranton Penguins	AHL	65	9	21	30	41	6	2	4	6	4
2002–03	Pittsburgh Penguins	NHL	2	0	0	0	0	—	—	—	—	—
2003–04	Pittsburgh Penguins	NHL	82	9	20	29	30	—	—	—	—	—
2003–04	Wilkes–Barre/Scranton Penguins	AHL	3	0	4	4	4	24	6	11	17	1
2004–05	Dinamo Minsk	BLR	11	6	2	8	38	—	—	—	—	—
2004–05	Spartak Moscow	RSL	31	6	10	16	48	—	—	—	—	—
2005–06	Pittsburgh Penguins	NHL	60	3	6	9	20	—	—	—	—	—
2005–06	Wilkes–Barre/Scranton Penguins	AHL	18	7	5	12	13	—	—	—	—	—
2006–07	Salavat Yulaev Ufa	RSL	54	14	11	25	43	8	1	1	2	2
2007–08	Salavat Yulaev Ufa	RSL	37	12	10	22	27	14	3	1	4	4
2008–09	Salavat Yulaev Ufa	KHL	42	8	7	15	14	4	0	2	2	0
2009–10	Salavat Yulaev Ufa	KHL	48	8	17	25	28	16	3	1	4	2
2010–11	Salavat Yulaev Ufa	KHL	32	4	11	15	16	—	—	—	—	—
2011–12	Salavat Yulaev Ufa	KHL	51	1	11	12	20	6	0	0	0	2
2012–13	Atlant Mytishchi	KHL	52	6	6	12	26	5	0	0	0	0
2013–14	Atlant Mytishchi	KHL	54	11	10	21	22	—	—	—	—	—
2014–15	Atlant Mytishchi	KHL	34	2	1	3	20	—	—	—	—	—
2014–15	Ak Bars Kazan	KHL	19	0	2	2	7	20	3	3	6	4
2015–16	Dinamo Minsk	KHL	43	3	7	10	14	—	—	—	—	—
NHL totals			144	12	26	38	50	—	—	—	—	—
RSL totals			244	47	44	91	164	40	6	3	9	18
KHL totals			375	43	73	116	167	51	6	6	12	8

=== International ===
Year	Team	Event	GP	G	A	Pts	PIM8	Ref.
1999	Belarus	WJC	6	4	3	7	30
1999	Belarus	WJC18 B	5	5	2	7	0
1999	Belarus	WC	6	0	0	0	4
2000	Belarus	WJC B	5	3	1	4	2
2001	Belarus	WJC	6	4	1	5	2
2001	Belarus	OGQ	3	2	0	2	0
2001	Belarus	WC	6	0	0	0	4
2002	Belarus	OG	2	0	0	0	0
2002	Belarus	WC D1	5	7	1	8	2
2005	Belarus	OGQ	2	0	0	0	0
2005	Belarus	WC	6	3	3	6	2
2007	Belarus	WC	3	2	2	4	2
2008	Belarus	WC	3	1	2	3	0
2009	Belarus	WC	5	1	0	1	2
2010	Belarus	OG	4	0	2	2	0
2012	Belarus	WC	7	2	0	2	8
2013	Belarus	OGQ	3	1	0	1	0
2013	Belarus	WC	7	2	0	2	0
2014	Belarus	WC	5	0	0	0	0
Junior totals			22	16	7	23	34
Senior totals			67	21	10	31	24

== Awards and honours ==
- Spartak Cup (Russian: Кубок Спартака) : 2001
- President of Bashkortostan Republic Cup (Russian: Кубок Президента Республики Башкортостан) : 2006
- Romazan Cup (Russian: Кубок Ромазана) : 2006
- Polesye Cup (Russian: Кубок Полесья, Belarusian: Кубак Палесся) : 2007
- Russian Super League: 2008

Awards and achievements
Preceded by Milan Kraft	Pittsburgh Penguins first-round draft pick 1999	Succeeded by Brooks Orpik
