= Jan Benda =

- Born: 28 April 1972 (age 53) Reet, Belgium
- Height: 6 ft 5 in (196 cm)
- Weight: 216 lb (98 kg; 15 st 6 lb)
- Position: Centre
- Shot: Right
- Played for: EHC München; Nürnberg Ice Tigers; BK Mladá Boleslav; Slavia Praha; HC Plzeň 1929; HC Litvínov; HC Chemopetrol; HC Hamé Zlín; Khimik Voskresensk; Severstal Cherepovets; Ak Bars Kazan; Jokerit; Ässät; Sparta Praha; Hedos München; EHC Freiburg
- National team: Germany
- NHL draft: Undrafted
- Playing career: 1992–2018

Jan Benda (born 28 April 1972) is a Belgian-born German ice hockey coach and retired player. He played nine games in the National Hockey League with the Washington Capitals during the 1997–98 season. The rest of his career, which lasted from 1992 to 2018, was mainly spent in various European leagues. Internationally Benda played for the German national team at the 1994, 1998, and 2002 Winter Olympics, and nine World Championships.

== Career ==
Born in Belgium to Czech parents, Benda started his career in the OHL with the Oshawa Generals, where he played with future NHL stars such as Eric Lindros, Jason Arnott, and Stephane Yelle. In his final year with the Generals, he would finish with 35 points in 61 games. After playing 2 seasons in Germany, Benda would return to North America for the 1994-95 ECHL season to play for the Richmond Renegades. He would finish the season with 60 points in 62 games, which ranked fifth on the team that season. That season, he also briefly played for the Binghamton Rangers, the AHL affiliate of the New York Rangers. The next two seasons, Benda would play for HC Sparta Praha.

Benda would later return to North America for the 1997-98 season, where he was assigned to the Washington Capitals AHL affiliate, the Portland Pirates. He was later recalled to play for the Capitals, where he would score three assists in nine games. Upon completion of the 1997-98 season, Benda would return to Europe. He would play the next three seasons in the Finnish SM-Liiga, where he would lead his team in points during the 1998-99 season (with Porin Ässät) and in 1999-00 (with Jokerit). Benda would leave Finland in 2001 to sign with Ak Bars Kazan of the Russian Superleague. He would spend the next three seasons in Kazan and would split his final year between Khimik Voskresensk and Severstal Cherepovets.

Benda played in the Czech Republic for BK Mladá Boleslav, whom he joined in 2008 where he was the captain. Before joining BK Mladá Boleslav, he had played with HC Litvínov from 2006 to 2008.

Benda represented Germany at the 2002 World Championships, the 1996 World Cup of Hockey, and the Winter Olympics in 1994, 1998, and 2002.

Benda played for HC Plzeň 1929 and scored 35 points in 51 regular season games during the 2009-10 season.

In 2011, he returned to Germany, joining the Nürnberg Ice Tigers of the Deutsche Eishockey Liga on a short-term deal, before signing with EHC München for the remainder of the 2011-12 season.

He then spent the 2012-13 campaign with the Dresdner Eislöwen in Germany's second-tier league DEL2.

The 2014–15 season saw Benda score 10 goals and dish 29 assists in 42 games for Deggendorf Fire in the German Oberliga. For the 2015–16 season, he moved to ECDC Memmingen, a member of the Bayernliga in Germany. Along with his playing duties he served as a coach in the club's youth program. When ECDC head coach Alexander Wedl was sacked in January 2016, Benda took over head coaching duties on an interim basis. His playing career ended in June 2018 at age 46.

Following his playing days, Benda worked for ECDC Memmingen as an assistant coach and youth coach.

== Career statistics ==
=== Regular season and playoffs ===
			Regular season					Playoffs
Season	Team	League	GP	G	A	Pts	PIM	GP	G	A	Pts	PIM
1988–89	Henry Carr Crusaders	MetJHL	18	0	3	3	22	—	—	—	—	—
1989–90	Oshawa Legionnaires	MetJHL	44	50	80	130	24	—	—	—	—	—
1989–90	Oshawa Generals	OHL	1	0	1	1	0	—	—	—	—	—
1990–91	Oshawa Generals	OHL	51	4	11	15	64	16	2	4	6	19
1991–92	Oshawa Generals	OHL	61	12	23	35	68	7	1	1	2	12
1992–93	EHC Freiburg	GER	41	6	11	17	49	—	—	—	—	—
1993–94	Hedos München	GER	43	16	11	27	67	10	3	2	5	21
1994–95	Binghamton Rangers	AHL	4	0	0	0	0	—	—	—	—	—
1994–95	Richmond Renegades	ECHL	62	21	39	60	187	17	8	5	13	30
1995–96	ESC Moskitos Essen	GER-2	2	1	0	1	6	—	—	—	—	—
1995–96	HC Slavia Praha	CZE	24	7	14	21	24	7	1	6	7	33
1996–97	HC Sparta Praha	CZE	44	7	21	28	74	10	1	1	2	14
1997–98	Washington Capitals	NHL	9	0	3	3	6	—	—	—	—	—
1997–98	Portland Pirates	AHL	62	25	29	54	90	8	0	7	7	6
1997–98	HC Sparta Praha	CZE	3	0	1	1	4	—	—	—	—	—
1998–99	Ässät	SM-l	52	21	22	43	139	—	—	—	—	—
1999–2000	Jokerit	SM-l	52	19	28	47	99	11	2	4	6	16
2000–01	Jokerit	SM-l	52	18	26	44	56	5	0	1	1	6
2001–02	Ak Bars Kazan	RSL	33	8	12	20	61	11	2	5	7	40
2002–03	Ak Bars Kazan	RSL	51	14	24	38	68	5	2	0	2	6
2003–04	Ak Bars Kazan	RSL	56	4	17	21	74	5	1	0	1	6
2004–05	Severstal Cherepovets	RSL	34	4	6	10	32	—	—	—	—	—
2004–05	Khimik Voskresensk	RSL	19	2	8	10	20	—	—	—	—	—
2005–06	HC Chemopetrol	CZE	44	13	22	35	54	—	—	—	—	—
2005–06	HC Hamé Zlín	CZE	6	3	4	7	14	6	1	2	3	10
2006–07	HC Chemopetrol	CZE	45	10	16	26	77	—	—	—	—	—
2007–08	HC Litvínov	CZE	45	10	14	24	50	—	—	—	—	—
2008–09	BK Mladá Boleslav	CZE	51	8	17	25	56	—	—	—	—	—
2009–10	HC Plzeň 1929	CZE	51	6	29	35	65	6	0	2	2	0
2010–11	KLH Chomutov	CZE-2	23	3	8	11	32	—	—	—	—	—
2010–11	HC Slavia Praha	CZE	11	1	3	4	8	—	—	—	—	—
2010–11	BK Mladá Boleslav	cZE	8	1	1	2	8	—	—	—	—	—
2011–12	Thomas Sabo Ice Tigers	DEL	17	1	2	3	2	—	—	—	—	—
2011–12	EHC München	DEL	31	1	4	5	14	—	—	—	—	—
2012–13	Dresdner Eislöwen	GER-2	47	2	11	13	60	—	—	—	—	—
2013–14	Deggendorf Fire	GER-3	42	10	29	39	34	—	—	—	—	—
2014–15	Deggendorfer SC	GER-3	41	9	27	36	22	4	0	0	0	2
2015–16	ECDC Memmingen	GER-4	34	11	37	48	12	4	0	3	3	2
2016–17	ECDC Memmingen	GER-4	21	8	33	41	8	2	1	1	2	2
2017–18	ECDC Memmingen	GER-3	15	1	8	9	10	—	—	—	—	—
CZE totals			332	66	142	208	434	29	3	11	14	57
NHL totals			9	0	3	3	6	—	—	—	—	—

=== International ===
Year	Team	Event	GP	G	A	Pts	PIM
1994	Germany	OLY	8	0	1	1	6
1994	Germany	WC	5	0	0	0	24
1996	Germany	WC	6	1	2	3	33
1996	Germany	WCH	4	2	1	3	0
1997	Germany	OLY-Q	3	2	0	2	2
1997	Germany	WC	8	0	2	2	18
1998	Germany	OLY	4	3	0	3	8
1999	Germany	WC B	7	1	5	6	16
2000	Germany	OLY-Q	3	2	1	3	6
2001	Germany	OGQ	3	0	0	0	0
2001	Germany	WC	7	0	1	1	4
2002	Germany	OLY	7	1	0	1	2
2002	Germany	WC	7	1	7	8	14
2003	Germany	WC	6	1	2	3	4
2004	Germany	WC	6	2	0	2	0
2005	Germany	WC	6	1	3	4	27
Senior totals			90	17	24	41	164
