= Žagars =

Žagars is a Latvian surname. Notable people with the surname include:

- Andrejs Žagars (1958–2019), Latvian actor and opera director
- Artūrs Žagars (born 2000), Latvian basketball player
- Ronalds Žagars (born 1950), Latvian footballer

== See also ==
- Žagar (surname)
