= Zagar =

Zagar may refer to:

- Zagar (god), a Mesopotamian god
- Zagăr, village in Romania
- Žagar (band), Hungarian band
- Žagar (surname), Slavic surname

People with the surname

- Isaiah Zagar (1939–2026), American mosaic artist
- Jeremiah Zagar (born 1981), American filmmaker
- Theo Zagar (born 1974), Canadian footballer
