= Boštjan Goličič =

Slovenian ice hockey player (born 1989)

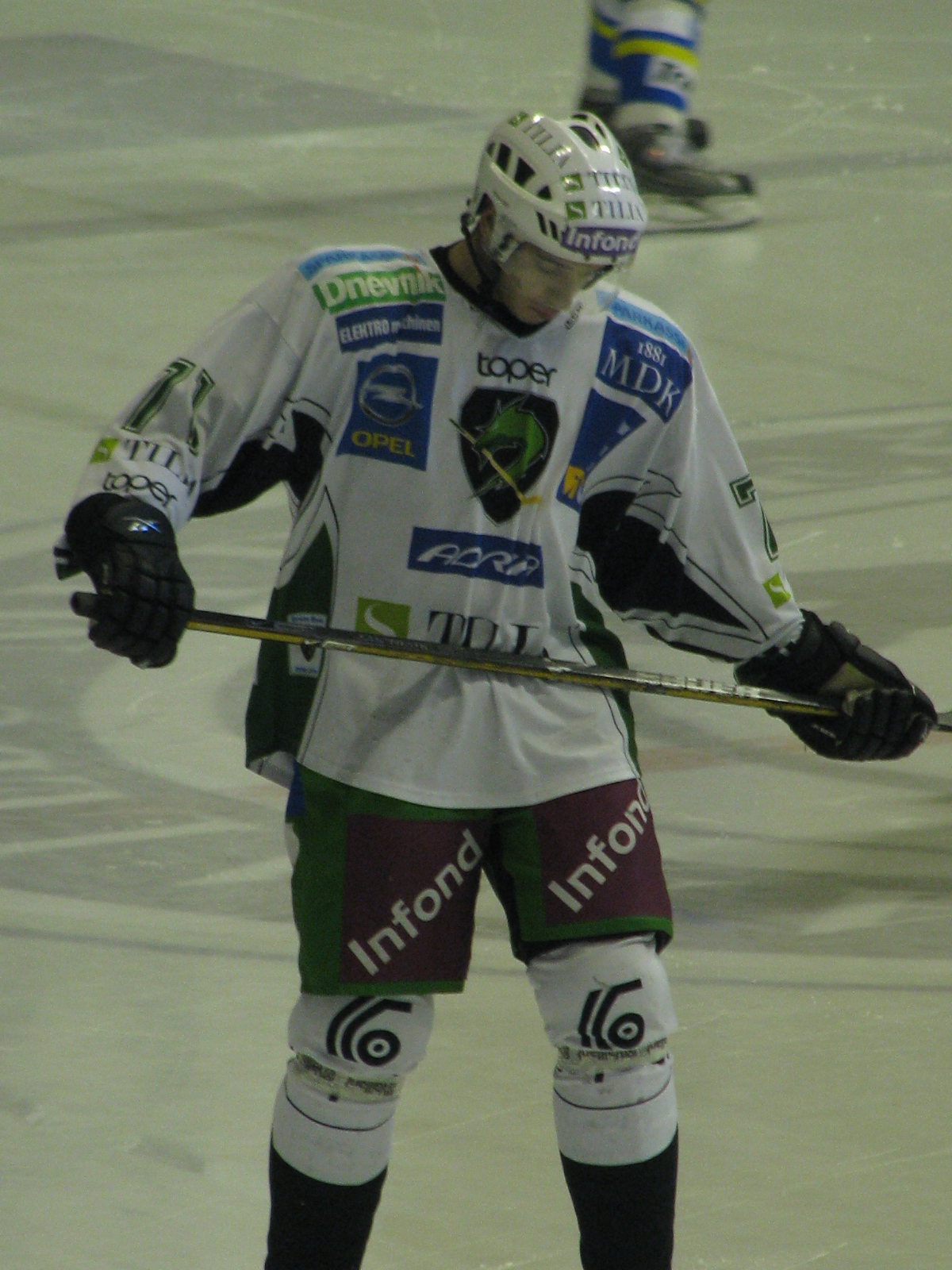
- Born: June 12, 1989 (age 35); Kranj, SR Slovenia, SFR Yugoslavia
- Height: 6 ft 0 in (183 cm)
- Weight: 194 lb (88 kg; 13 st 12 lb)
- Position: Left wing
- Shoots: Left
- LM team Former teams: Boxers de Bordeaux; HDD Olimpija Ljubljana; Briançon; Rapaces de Gap; Brûleurs de loups
- National team: Slovenia
- NHL draft: Undrafted
- Playing career: 2009–present

Boštjan Goličič (born June 12, 1989) is a Slovenian ice hockey forward currently playing for Boxers de Bordeaux of the Ligue Magnus. He is a brother of Jurij Goličič.

He participated at several IIHF World Championships as a member of the Slovenia men's national ice hockey team.

== Career statistics ==
=== Regular season and playoffs ===
			Regular season					Playoffs
Season	Team	League	GP	G	A	Pts	PIM	GP	G	A	Pts	PIM
2003–04	HKMK Bled	SVN U20	19	2	2	4	4	—	—	—	—	—
2004–05	HKMK Bled	SVN U20	18	4	5	9	16	—	—	—	—	—
2005–06	HKMK Bled	SVN U20
2005–06	HKMK Bled	AUT.4
2006–07	HKMK Bled	SVN U20	19	20	12	32	51	5	8	1	9	8
2006–07	HKMK Bled	AUT.4	23	24	21	45	26	—	—	—	—	—
2007–08	Calgary Hitmen	WHL	57	12	18	30	24	12	1	1	2	2
2008–09	Calgary Hitmen	WHL	67	26	30	56	26	18	4	10	14	10
2009–10	HDD Olimpija Ljubljana	AUT	47	8	17	25	49	—	—	—	—	—
2009–10	HDD Olimpija Ljubljana	SVN	4	2	3	5	2	6	3	4	7	8
2010–11	HDD Olimpija Ljubljana	AUT	54	10	18	28	18	4	0	1	1	0
2010–11	HDD Olimpija Ljubljana	SVN	3	3	2	5	0	4	0	1	1	2
2011–12	HDD Olimpija Ljubljana	AUT	38	5	10	15	16	11	1	4	5	9
2011–12	HDD Olimpija Ljubljana	SVN	—	—	—	—	—	6	1	1	2	2
2012–13	Diables Rouges de Briançon	FRA	26	10	16	26	16	8	7	4	11	6
2013–14	Diables Rouges de Briançon	FRA	21	10	14	24	18	14	7	5	12	31
2014–15	Rapaces de Gap	FRA	22	13	9	22	14	17	10	4	14	24
2015–16	Rapaces de Gap	FRA	23	13	13	26	31	6	1	1	2	2
2016–17	Brûleurs de Loups	FRA	36	17	20	37	18	12	4	8	12	20
2017–18	Brûleurs de Loups	FRA	37	19	31	50	20	13	5	5	10	20
2018–19	Brûleurs de Loups	FRA	4	2	2	4	2	—	—	—	—	—
2019–20	Boxers de Bordeaux	FRA	14	2	6	8	4	—	—	—	—	—
2019–20	Rapaces de Gap	FRA	23	7	6	13	20	4	1	2	3	6
2020–21	Rapaces de Gap	FRA	19	10	10	20	26	—	—	—	—	—
2021–22	Rapaces de Gap	FRA	40	15	16	31	45	6	1	1	2	0
AUT totals			139	23	45	68	83	15	1	5	6	9
FRA totals			265	118	143	261	214	80	36	30	66	109

=== International ===
Year	Team	Event	GP	G	A	Pts	PIM
2006	Slovenia	WJC18 D1	5	4	1	5	0
2007	Slovenia	WJC18 D1	5	3	3	6	4
2008	Slovenia	WJC D1	5	2	1	3	18
2009	Slovenia	WJC D1	5	0	4	4	33
2010	Slovenia	WC D1	5	0	1	1	2
2011	Slovenia	WC	6	2	1	3	0
2012	Slovenia	WC D1A	5	0	0	0	0
2013	Slovenia	OGQ	3	0	0	0	0
2013	Slovenia	WC	7	0	0	0	2
2014	Slovenia	OG	5	0	0	0	0
2014	Slovenia	WC D1A	5	1	1	2	2
2015	Slovenia	WC	6	0	0	0	2
2017	Slovenia	WC	7	0	0	0	2
2018	Slovenia	OG	4	0	0	0	0
2018	Slovenia	WC D1A	5	1	3	4	4
2019	Slovenia	WC D1A	5	1	3	4	4
Junior totals			20	9	9	18	55
Senior totals			63	5	9	14	18
