= Philippe Lakos =

Austrian ice hockey player

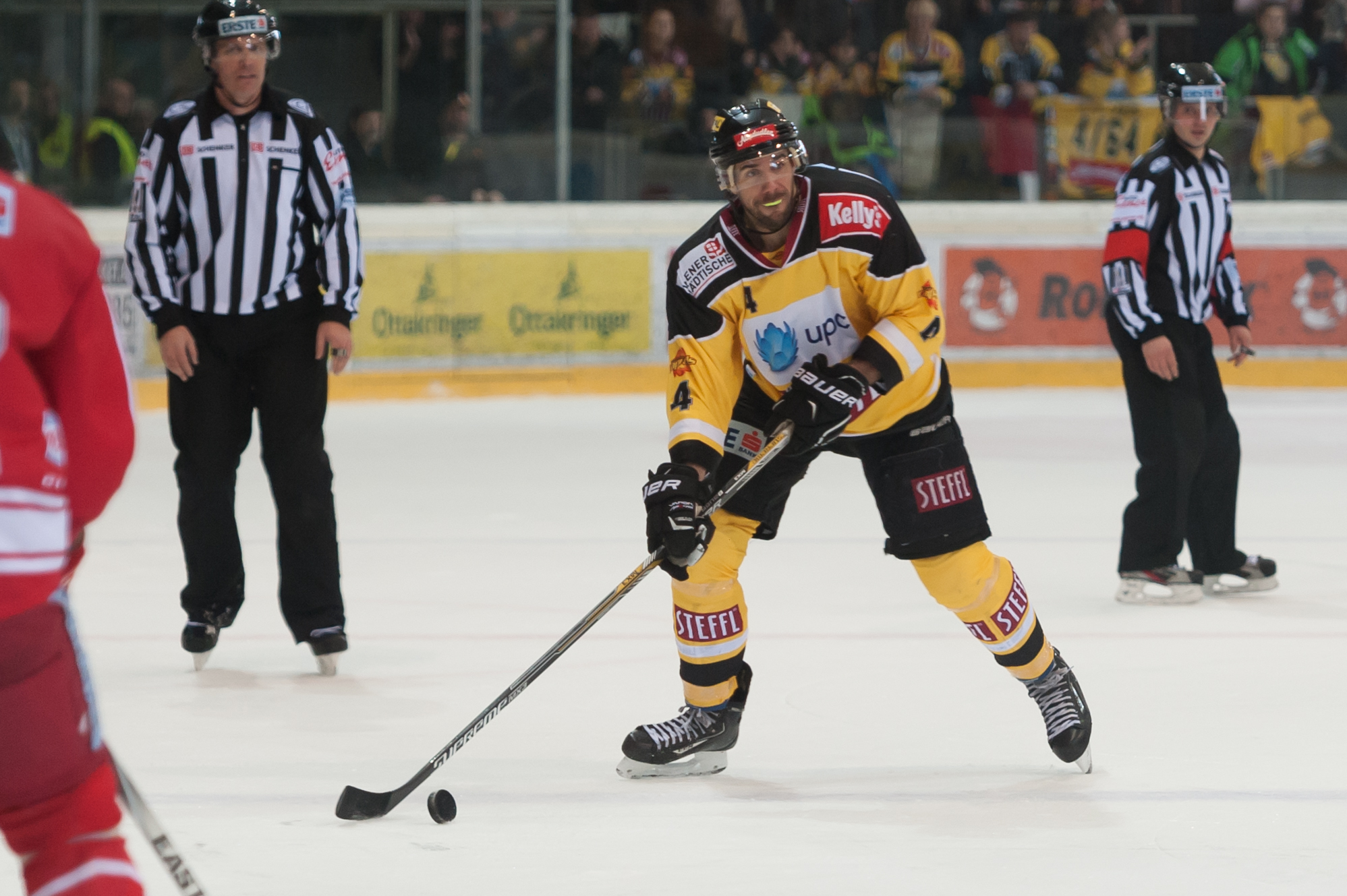
- Born: August 19, 1980 (age 45) Vienna, Austria
- Height: 6 ft 3 in (191 cm)
- Weight: 220 lb (100 kg; 15 st 10 lb)
- Position: Defence
- Shot: Right
- Played for: Vienna Capitals; HC TWK Innsbruck
- National team: Austria
- NHL draft: Undrafted
- Playing career: 2000–2022

Philippe Lakos (born August 19, 1980) is an Austrian former professional ice hockey defenceman who most notably played with the Vienna Capitals of the ICE Hockey League (ICEHL). He played 19 seasons with hometown club, the Capitals through to the 2021–22 season, and is currently the Franchise record holder with 755 regular season appearances.

He participated at the 2011 IIHF World Championship as a member of the Austria men's national ice hockey team.
