= Jurij Goličič =

Slovenian ice hockey player

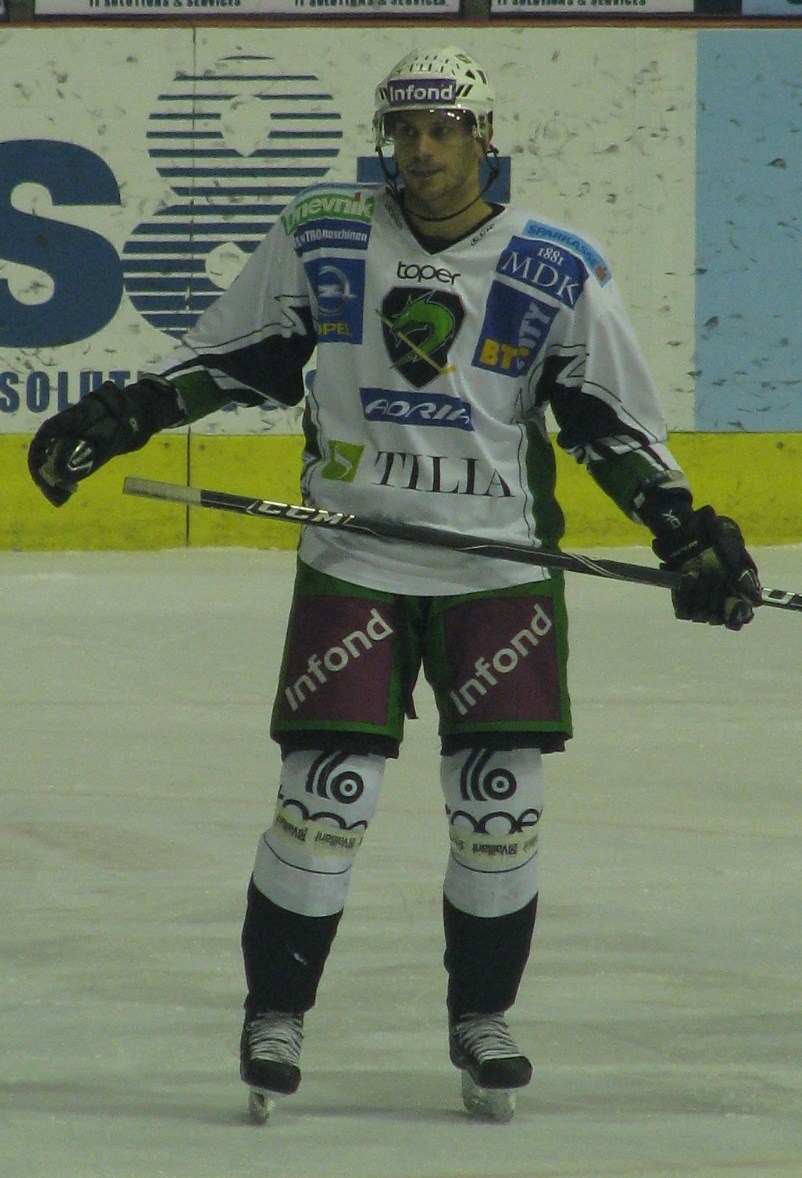
- Born: April 6, 1981 (age 43); Kranj, Slovenia
- Height: 6 ft 0 in (183 cm)
- Weight: 185 lb (84 kg; 13 st 3 lb)
- Position: Forward
- Shot: Left
- Played for: HDD Olimpija Ljubljana
- National team: Slovenia
- NHL draft: Undrafted
- Playing career: 1999–2010

Jurij Goličič (born April 6, 1981) is a Slovenian retired ice hockey player. He participated at the 2003, 2005, 2006, and 2008 IIHF World Championships as a member of the Slovenia men's national ice hockey team. He is a brother of Boštjan Goličič.

He played for the Owen Sound Platers of the OHL, where during a game in October 1998, he was sucker-punched by Jeff Kugel of the Windsor Spitfires. Kugel was given a 25-game suspension and a lifetime ban from the league (later repealed).
