= Stephan Retzer =

German ice hockey player

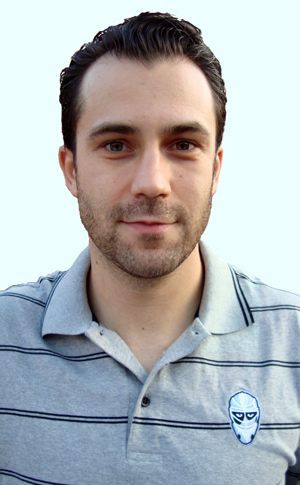
- Born: October 11, 1976 (age 48); Deggendorf, West Germany
- Height: 6 ft 0 in (183 cm)
- Weight: 194 lb (88 kg; 13 st 12 lb)
- Position: Defence
- Shot: Left
- Played for: EV Landshut; TSV Erding; Kassel Huskies; Adler Mannheim; Hamburg Freezers; ERC Ingolstadt
- National team: Germany
- NHL draft: Undrafted
- Playing career: 1994–2012

Stephan Retzer (born October 11, 1976) is a German professional ice hockey defenceman. He is currently playing for ERC Ingolstadt in the Deutsche Eishockey Liga (DEL).

== Career statistics ==
=== Regular season and playoffs ===
			Regular season					Playoffs
Season	Team	League	GP	G	A	Pts	PIM	GP	G	A	Pts	PIM
1992–93	EV Landshut	DEU U20	28	6	6	12	22	—	—	—	—	—
1993–94	EV Landshut	1.GBun	—	—	—	—	—	1	0	0	0	0
1994–95	EV Landshut	DEU U20	15	9	9	18	12	—	—	—	—	—
1994–95	EV Landshut	DEL	37	1	2	3	2	17	0	0	0	29
1995–96	EV Landshut	DEL	44	7	7	14	18	11	0	0	0	4
1996–97	EV Landshut	DEL	28	1	4	5	10	—	—	—	—	—
1996–97	TSV Erding	DEU.2	28	8	10	18	14	—	—	—	—	—
1997–98	TSV Erding	DEU.2	30	5	6	11	12	—	—	—	—	—
1998–99	TSV Erding	DEU.2	41	15	15	30	26	—	—	—	—	—
1999–2000	TSV Erding	DEU.3	51	9	20	29	24	—	—	—	—	—
2000–01	Erding Jets	DEU.2	44	13	18	31	22	—	—	—	—	—
2001–02	Kassel Huskies	DEL	36	3	3	6	10	6	1	1	2	0
2002–03	Kassel Huskies	DEL	51	1	7	8	24	7	0	1	1	2
2003–04	Kassel Huskies	DEL	52	4	11	15	18	—	—	—	—	—
2004–05	Kassel Huskies	DEL	52	1	8	9	8	—	—	—	—	—
2005–06	Adler Mannheim	DEL	48	5	6	11	28	—	—	—	—	—
2006–07	Adler Mannheim	DEL	29	0	1	1	22	—	—	—	—	—
2007–08	Hamburg Freezers	DEL	53	1	9	10	26	8	0	0	0	2
2008–09	Hamburg Freezers	DEL	49	3	14	17	24	9	0	1	1	6
2009–10	Hamburg Freezers	DEL	56	4	10	14	28	—	—	—	—	—
2010–11	ERC Ingolstadt	DEL	50	1	7	8	8	4	0	0	0	0
2011–12	ERC Ingolstadt	DEL	52	2	2	4	14	9	0	1	1	2
DEU.2 totals			143	41	49	90	74	—	—	—	—	—
DEL totals			637	34	91	125	240	78	2	5	7	45

=== International ===
Year	Team	Event	GP	G	A	Pts	PIM
1993	Germany	EJC	6	0	0	0	0
1994	Germany	WJC	7	0	0	0	2
1994	Germany	EJC	5	0	5	5	2
1995	Germany	WJC	7	1	0	1	4
1996	Germany	WJC	6	0	1	1	10
2003	Germany	WC	7	0	2	2	0
2004	Germany	WC	6	0	0	0	2
2004	Germany	WCH	2	0	0	0	0
2005	Germany	WC	6	0	1	1	2
Junior totals			31	1	6	7	18
Senior totals			21	0	3	3	4
