= Bernd Brückler =

Austrian ice hockey player

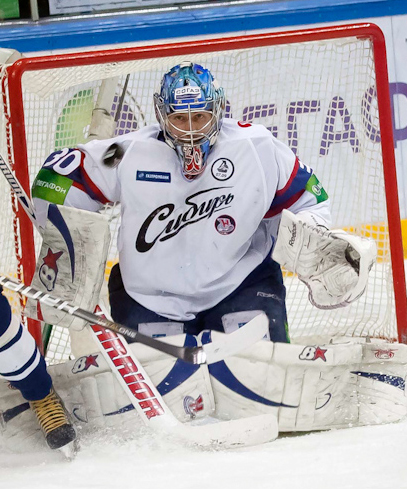
- Born: 26 August 1981 (age 44) Graz, Austria
- Height: 6 ft 1 in (185 cm)
- Weight: 191 lb (87 kg; 13 st 9 lb)
- Position: Goaltender
- Caught: Left
- Played for: EC Graz; Graz 99ers Hartford Wolf Pack; Espoo Blues; Torpedo Nizhny Novgorod; HC Sibir Novosibirsk; EC Red Bull Salzburg; EC KAC
- National team: Austria
- NHL draft: 150th overall, 2001; Philadelphia Flyers
- Playing career: 1996–2016

Bernd Brückler (born August 26, 1981) is an Austrian former professional ice hockey goaltender who played in the Austrian Hockey League (EBEL), the Finnish Liiga, and the Kontinental Hockey League (KHL).

== Playing career ==
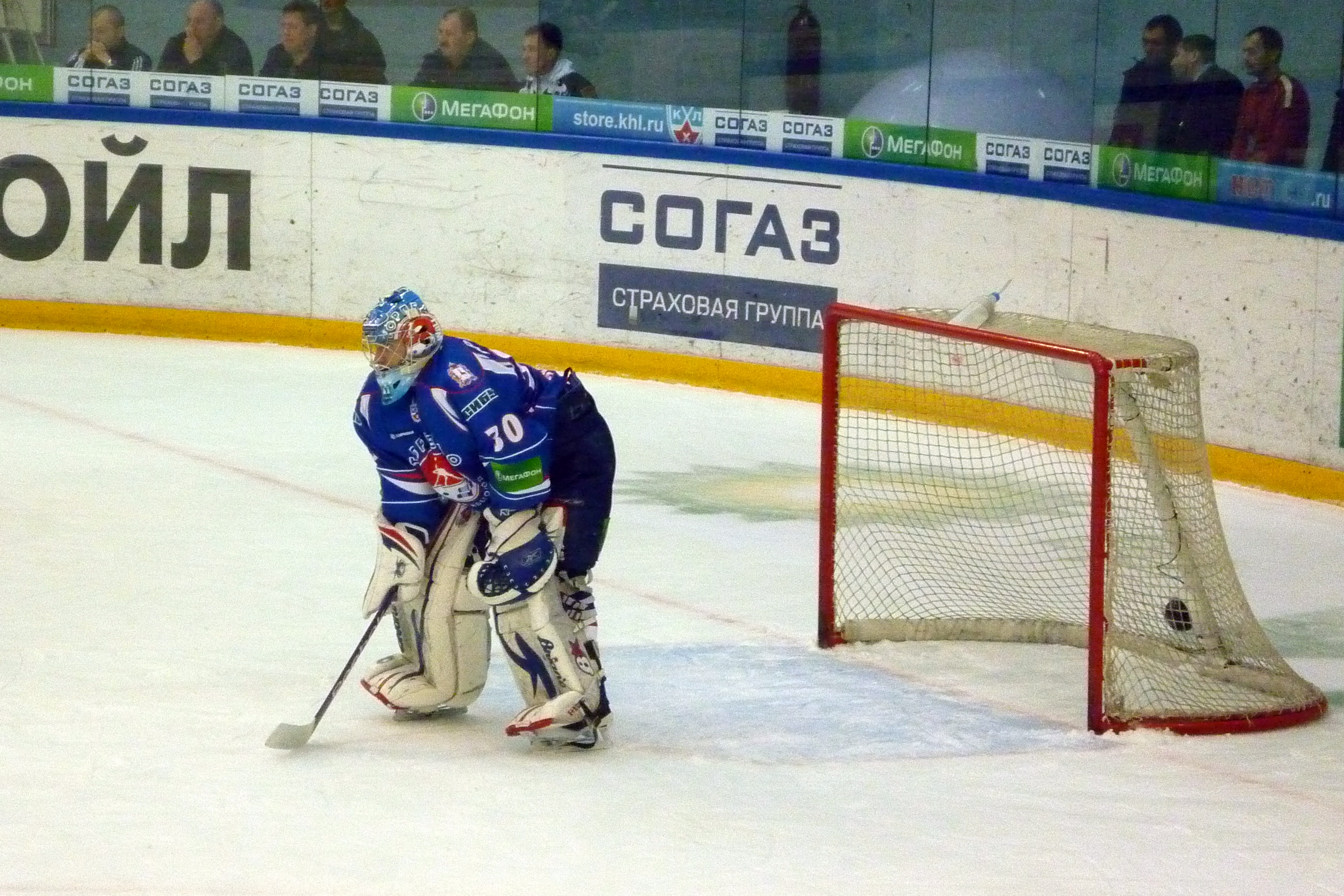

Brückler started his hockey career with Graz EC in the Austrian league, and has represented the Tri-City Storm and the University of Wisconsin–Madison in North America. He was drafted by the Philadelphia Flyers as their fifth-round pick in the 2001 NHL entry draft, 150th overall.

After short stints with several minor league teams, Brückler finished the 2005–06 season by taking the Espoo Blues of the Finnish SM-liiga into the playoffs. He posted a fantastic save percentage in his nine regular season games, registering three shutouts. On 23 April 2009, Brückler left Finland and signed with Kontinental Hockey League club Torpedo Nizhny Novgorod.

On 6 May 2011, Brückler signed a one-year contract with the KHL's Sibir Novosibirsk.

In December 2013, Brückler and Finnish hockey writer Risto Pakarinen wrote a book "This is Russia: Life in the KHL – Doctors, bazas and millions of air miles", about Brückler's time in the KHL.

On September 8, 2015, Brückler was signed as a free agent from Champions EC Red Bull Salzburg, to EC KAC as an injury replacement on a one-year contract.

== Awards and honors ==
| Award | Year |
|---|---|
| All-WCHA Rookie Team | 2001–02 |
| All-WCHA First Team | 2003–04 |
| AHCA West First-Team All-American | 2003–04 |
| All-WCHA Second Team | 2004–05 |
