= Jesper Damgaard =

Danish ice hockey player (born 1975)

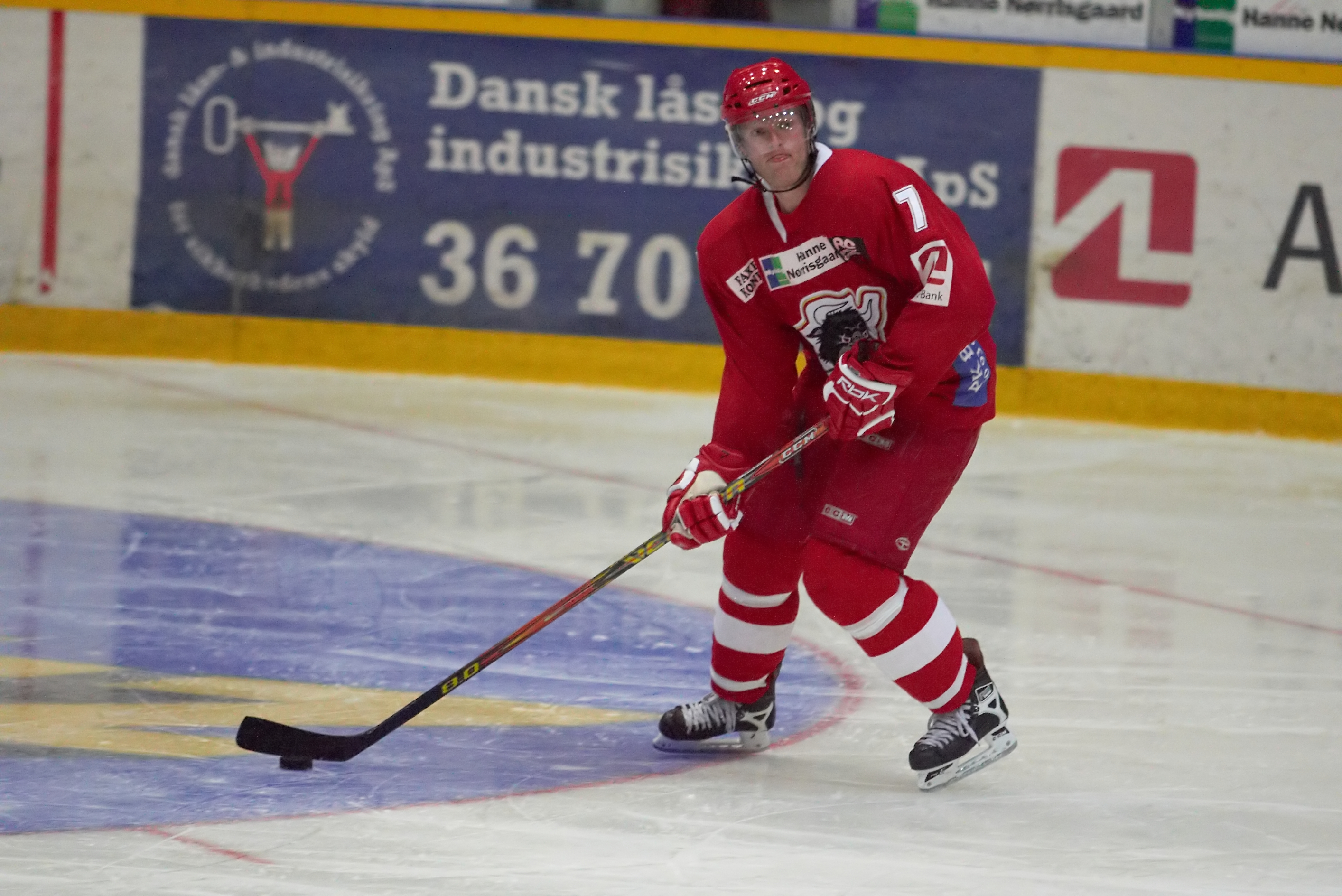
- Damgaard in 2007
- Born: May 6, 1975 (age 50) Holstebro, Denmark
- Height: 6 ft 2 in (188 cm)
- Weight: 207 lb (94 kg; 14 st 11 lb)
- Position: Defenceman
- Shot: Right
- Played for: Herning Blue Fox; Malmö Redhawks; Revierlöwen Oberhausen; MODO Hockey; Augsburger Panther; HC Lugano; Rødovre Mighty Bulls
- National team: Denmark
- NHL draft: undrafted
- Playing career: 1991–2011

Jesper Damgaard (born May 6, 1975) is a Danish retired ice hockey player who last participated at the 2010 IIHF World Championship as a member of the Denmark men's national ice hockey team.

He was the first and so far only Danish player to have his number, (#7), retired by the Denmark men's national ice hockey team. He represented Denmark at a record 17 consecutive World Championships, of which the last 8 were in the top division. He is the all-time most capped player for Denmark, having played for his country a record 256 times scoring 45 goals and 69 assists for a total of 114 points.

Damgaard was forced to retire following the 2010–11 season due to the aftermath of a concussion suffered while playing for the Malmö Redhawks. He attempted to return to the ice for the 2011 IIHF World Championship but was unable to shake the effects of the concussion.

In 2018, Damgaard was awarded the Torriani Award by the International Ice Hockey Federation for his contributions to Denmark's hockey, and was inducted into the IIHF Hall of Fame.

== Career statistics ==
=== Regular season and playoffs ===
			Regular season					Playoffs
Season	Team	League	GP	G	A	Pts	PIM	GP	G	A	Pts	PIM
1991–92	Herning IK	Denmark	22	0	2	2	24	—	—	—	—	—
1992–93	Herning II	Denmark2	—	—	—	—	—	—	—	—	—	—
1993–94	Malmo IF J20	Juniorallsvenskan	14	0	7	7	22	—	—	—	—	—
1993–94	Malmo IF	Elitserien	1	0	0	0	0	—	—	—	—	—
1994–95	Malmo IF J20	J20 Superelit	30	5	7	12	30	—	—	—	—	—
1994–95	Malmo IF	Elitserien	15	0	0	0	2	—	—	—	—	—
1995–96	Malmo IF J20	J20 Superelit	9	2	3	5	8	—	—	—	—	—
1995–96	Malmo IF	Elitserien	34	1	2	3	14	5	0	1	1	2
1996–97	MIF Redhawks J20	J20 Superelit	2	0	0	0	0	—	—	—	—	—
1996–97	MIF Redhawks	Elitserien	49	2	4	6	18	4	0	0	0	0
1997–98	MIF Redhawks	Elitserien	32	2	1	3	22	—	—	—	—	—
1998–99	MIF Redhawks	Elitserien	41	3	0	3	16	8	0	1	1	0
1999–00	MIF Redhawks J20	J20 Superelit	2	0	0	0	4	—	—	—	—	—
1999–00	MIF Redhawks	Elitserien	35	0	6	6	16	2	0	0	0	0
2000–01	Revier Löwen Oberhausen	DEL	60	7	12	19	38	3	0	1	1	0
2001–02	Revier Löwen Oberhausen	DEL	57	3	13	16	53	—	—	—	—	—
2002–03	Modo Hockey	Elitserien	46	4	8	12	26	6	0	1	1	2
2003–04	Modo Hockey	Elitserien	50	6	9	15	51	5	0	4	4	6
2004–05	Modo Hockey	Elitserien	44	7	7	14	28	6	2	1	3	4
2005–06	Modo Hockey	Elitserien	50	7	7	14	38	5	0	1	1	6
2006–07	Augsburger Panther	DEL	49	6	9	15	28	—	—	—	—	—
2006–07	HC Lugano	NLA	1	0	0	0	0	1	0	0	0	4
2007–08	Rødovre Mighty Bulls	Denmark	45	4	27	31	50	7	0	3	3	8
2008–09	Malmö Redhawks	HockeyAllsvenskan	33	5	9	14	32	—	—	—	—	—
2009–10	Malmö Redhawks	HockeyAllsvenskan	36	0	4	4	62	5	0	4	4	12
2010–11	Malmö Redhawks	HockeyAllsvenskan	13	4	1	5	14	—	—	—	—	—
Elitserien totals			397	32	44	76	231	41	2	9	11	20
