= Quido Adamec =

Czech ice hockey referee

- Born: 15 December 1924; Prague, Czechoslovakia
- Died: 22 July 2007 (aged 82); Prague, Czech Republic
- Occupation: Ice hockey referee
- Awards: IIHF Hall of Fame

Quido Adamec (15 December 1924 – 22 July 2007) was a Czech ice hockey referee. Adamec worked as an official at seven Ice Hockey World Championships and was the chairman for the Czech referee committee. He also sat on the International Ice Hockey Federation (IIHF) referee's committee. Adamec was inducted into the IIHF Hall of Fame in 2005 before his death in 2007. In 2016, he was posthumously inducted into the Czech Hockey Hall of Fame.
