= OlympiaWorld Innsbruck =

Sports and events venue in Innsbruck, Austria

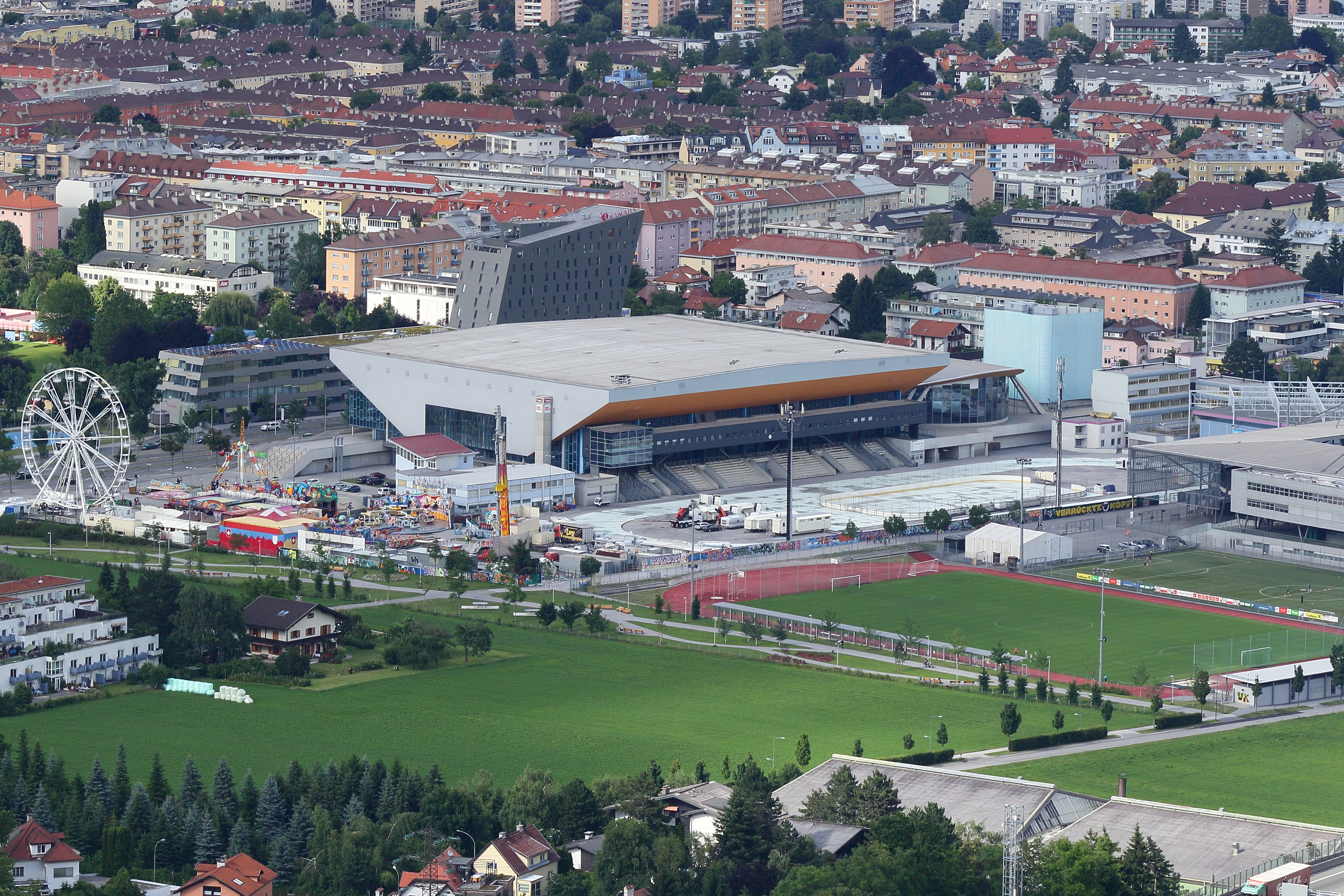
- Interactive map of OlympiaWorld Innsbruck
- Full name: Olympia Sports and Event Centre Innsbruck
- Location: Innsbruck, Austria
- Coordinates: 47.25778°N 11.40965°E
- Capacity: Olympiahalle Innsbruck: 10,000 (sports)/12,000 (music); Tivoli Stadium: 17,000; Tiroler Wasserkraft Arena: 3,600; Indoor Funsporthallen: 500; Außenanlagen: 30,000

Construction
- Opened: 1963; 63 years ago
- Renovated: 2000–2004

OlympiaWorld Innsbruck is a multi-purpose sports complex in Innsbruck, Austria, which opened in 1963.The complex served as the Olympic Park of the 1964 and 1976 Winter Olympics, as well as the Winter Youth Olympics in 2012.

The complex is owned by OlympiaWorld, a commercial company whose shareholders are the city of Innsbruck and the federal state of Tyrol, each with 50%, and is used as a base for sporting events, exhibitions, fairs, shows and concerts.

== Venues ==
The sports park consists of eight venues:

- Olympiahalle Innsbruck
- Tivoli Stadium
- Tiroler Wasserkraft Arena
- Tyrolean State Sports Center
- Olympic Sliding Centre Innsbruck
- Indoor Funsporthallen
- Außenanlagen
- Eisschnellaufbahn

== Concerts ==
The pop rock singer P!nk performed at the venue on June 5, 2010, during her Funhouse Summer Carnival tour. The Olympiahalle was suggested as the venue of the Eurovision Song Contest 2015, which was ultimately staged at Wiener Stadthalle in Vienna.
