= Luka Žagar =

Slovenian ice hockey player

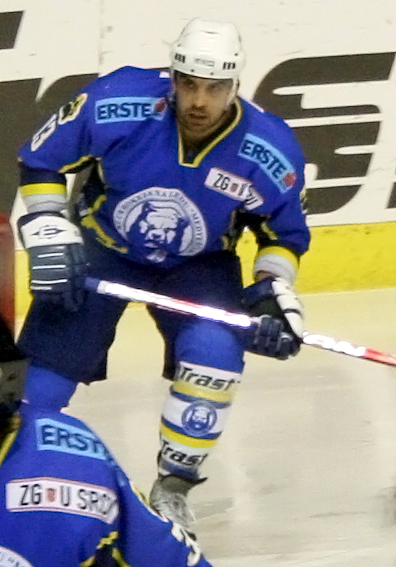
- Born: June 25, 1978 (age 47) Ljubljana, SR Slovenia, Yugoslavia
- Height: 6 ft 0 in (183 cm)
- Weight: 198 lb (90 kg; 14 st 2 lb)
- Position: Left wing
- Played for: HDD Olimpija Ljubljana; HK Slavija Ljubljana; HK Acroni Jesenice; Medveščak Zagreb
- National team: Slovenia
- Playing career: 1995–2010

Luka Zagar (born June 25, 1978, in Ljubljana, Slovenia) is a Slovenian professional ice hockey player.

== Career statistics ==
=== Austrian Hockey League ===
	Seasons	GP	Goals	Assists	Pts	PIM
Regular season	3	88	5	11	16	34
Playoffs	1	4	0	1	1	4
