= 1998 Karjala Tournament =

Tournament details
- Host country: Finland
- City: Helsinki
- Venue: 1 (in 1 host city)
- Dates: 5-8 November 1998
- Teams: 4

Final positions
- Champions: Finland (2nd title)
- Runners-up: Russia
- Third place: Czech Republic
- Fourth place: Sweden

Tournament statistics
- Games played: 6
- Goals scored: 30 (5 per game)
- Attendance: 41,037 (6,840 per game)
- Scoring leader(s): (Finland) Marko Tuomainen (Sweden) Anders Huusko (3 points)

The 1998 Karjala Tournament was played between 5 and 8 November 1998. The Czech Republic, Finland, Sweden and Russia played a round-robin for a total of three games per team and six games in total. ALl of the games was played in Hartwall Areena, Helsinki, Finland. Finland won the tournament. The tournament was part of the 1998–99 Euro Hockey Tour.

== Standings ==
| Pos | Team | Pld | W | D | L | GF | GA | GD | Pts |
|---|---|---|---|---|---|---|---|---|---|
| 1 | Finland | 3 | 2 | 1 | 0 | 10 | 7 | +3 | 5 |
| 2 | Russia | 3 | 1 | 1 | 1 | 8 | 6 | +2 | 3 |
| 3 | Czech Republic | 3 | 0 | 2 | 1 | 7 | 9 | −2 | 2 |
| 4 | Sweden | 3 | 0 | 2 | 1 | 5 | 8 | −3 | 2 |

Source: hokej

== Games ==
All times are local. Helsinki – (Eastern European Time – UTC+2)

| 5 November 1998; 17:00 | Czech Republic | 2-2 (2-1, 0-0, 0-1) | Sweden | Hartwall Areena, Helsinki; Attendance: 500 |

Game reference

Roman Čechmánek
Goalies
Johan Hedberg

| Martínek (Richter) – 05:56 | 1-0 |
| Patera (Procházka) – 18:02 | 2-0 |
| | 2-1 | 19:10 – Frylén (Olsson, Söderberg) |
| | 2-2 | 47:22 – Larsson (Olsson) |

18 min
Penalties
16 min
26
Shots
26

| 5 November 1998; 18:00 | Finland | 3-2 (1-1, 1-1, 1-0) | Russia | Hartwall Areena, Helsinki; Attendance: 3,211 |

Game reference

Ari Sulander
Goalies
Maxim Sokolov

| Riihijärvi (Keskinen, Varis) – 03:55 | 1-0 |
| | 1-1 | 11:59 – Petrenko (Afinogenov, Prokopiev) |
| | 1-2 | 26:28 – Markov (Petrenko, Khavanov) |
| Tuomainen (Helminen, Nummelin) – 30:14 | 2-2 |
| Kiprusoff (Pirjetä) – 44:26 | 3-2 |

16
Shots
24

| 7 November 1998; 15:00 | Russia | 4-1 (2-1, 2-0, 0-0) | Sweden | Hartwall Areena, Helsinki; Attendance: 4,956 |

Game reference

Maxim Sokolov
Goalies
Magnus Eriksson

| Prokopiev (Petrenko, Afinogenov) – 03:46 | 1-0 |
| | 1-1 | 06:51 – Huusko (Påhlsson, Eklund) |
| Barkov (Petrov) – 13:14 | 2-1 |
| Samylin (Petrov, Barkov) – 21:21 | 3-1 |
| Agarkov (Gorshkov) – 23:04 | 4-1 |

10 min
Penalties
6 min
32
Shots
15

| 7 November 1998; 18:30 | Czech Republic | 3-5 (2-3, 1-2, 0-0) | Finland | Hartwall Areena, Helsinki; Attendance: 10,327 |

Game reference

Jaroslav Kameš
Goalies
Vesa Toskala

| | 0-1 | 07:07 – Ruutu (Eloranta, Lius) |
| | 0-2 | 08:24 – Berg (Kauppila, Riihijärvi) |
| | 0-3 | 09:35 – Tuomainen (Ruutu, Nummelin) |
| Výborný (Ujčík) – 10:04 | 1-3 |
| Srdínko (Procházka, Patera) – 19:01 | 2-3 |
| Kucharčík (Richter) – 22:57 | 3-3 |
| | 3-4 | 26:20 – Riihijärvi (Nummelin, Karalahti) |
| | 3-5 | 36:34 – Tuomainen (Lind) |

6 min
Penalties
8 min
23
Shots
30

| 8 November 1998; 15:00 | Czech Republic | 2-2 (0-1, 0-1, 2-0) | Russia | Hartwall Areena, Helsinki; Attendance: 9,657 |

Game reference

Roman Čechmánek
Goalies
Oleg Shevtsov

| | 0-1 | 15:09 – Kudashov (Sarmatin) |
| | 0-2 | 21:10 – Samylin (Barkov) |
| Kucharčík (Ujčík) – 50:04 | 1-2 |
| Procházka (Patera, Čaloun) – 53:30 | 2-2 |

10 min
Penalties
8 min
25
Shots
20

| 8 November 1998; 18:30 | Finland | 2-2 (1-1, 1-0, 0-1) | Sweden | Hartwall Areena, Helsinki; Attendance: 12,386 |

Game reference

Ari Sulander
Goalies
Johan Hedberg

| Karalahti (Kauppila, Varis) – 03:08 | 1-0 |
| | 1-1 | 03:50 – Huusko (Jönsson) |
| Kauppila (Lind) – 35:26 | 2-1 |
| | 2-2 | 45:10 – Huusko (Djoos, Larsson) |

10 min
Penalties
4 min
20
Shots
26

== Scoring leaders ==
| Pos | Player | Country | GP | G | A | Pts | +/− | PIM | POS |
|---|---|---|---|---|---|---|---|---|---|
| 1 | Anders Huusko | Sweden | 3 | 3 | 0 | 3 | +2 | 2 | F |
| 2 | Marko Tuomainen | Finland | 3 | 3 | 0 | 3 | +1 | 0 | F |
| 3 | Juha Riihijärvi | Finland | 3 | 2 | 1 | 3 | +2 | 0 | F |
| 4 | Pavel Patera | Czech Republic | 3 | 1 | 2 | 3 | +1 | 0 | F |
| 5 | Sergei Petrenko | Russia | 3 | 1 | 2 | 3 | 0 | 2 | F |

GP = Games played; G = Goals; A = Assists; Pts = Points; +/− = Plus/minus; PIM = Penalties in minutes; POS = Position
Source: quanthockey

== Goaltending leaders ==
| Pos | Player | Country | TOI | GA | GAA | Sv% | SO |
|---|---|---|---|---|---|---|---|
| 1 | Maxim Sokolov | Russia | 120:00 | 3 | 1.50 | 94.55 | 0 |
| 2 | Johan Hedberg | Sweden | 156:56 | 4 | 1.53 | 93.55 | 0 |
| 2 | Roman Čechmánek | Czech Republic | 109:29 | 4 | 2.19 | 93.55 | 0 |
| 4 | Ari Sulander | Finland | 120:00 | 4 | 2.00 | 91.84 | 0 |
| 5 | Jaroslav Kameš | Czech Republic | 00:00 | 5 | 4.31 | 85.29 | 0 |

TOI = Time on ice (minutes:seconds); SA = Shots against; GA = Goals against; GAA = Goals Against Average; Sv% = Save percentage; SO = Shutouts
Source: swehockey

== Tournament awards ==
The tournament directorate named the following players in the tournament 1998:

- Best goalkeeper: (Russia) Maxim Sokolov
- Best defenceman: (Finland) Petteri Nummelin
- Best forward: (Finland) Marko Tuomainen

Media All-Star Team:

- Goaltender: (Finland) Ari Sulander
- Defence: (Finland) Petteri Nummelin, (Finland) Aki-Petteri Berg
- Forwards: (Finland) Marko Tuomainen, (Czech Republic) Pavel Patera, (Finland) Juha Riihijärvi
