= 1999 Sweden Hockey Games =

Tournament details
- Host country: Sweden
- City: Stockholm
- Venue: 1 (in 1 host city)
- Dates: 9-14 February 1999
- Teams: 5

Final positions
- Champions: Finland (2nd title)
- Runners-up: Sweden
- Third place: Canada
- Fourth place: Russia

Tournament statistics
- Games played: 10
- Goals scored: 50 (5 per game)
- Attendance: 67,510 (6,751 per game)
- Scoring leader: (Finland) Marko Tuomainen (5 points)

The 1999 Sweden Hockey Games was played between 9 and 14 February 1999 in Stockholm, Sweden. The Czech Republic, Finland, Sweden, Russia and Canada played a round-robin for a total of four games per team and 10 games in total. All of the games were played in the Globen in Stockholm, Sweden. The tournament was won by Finland. The tournament was part of 1998–99 Euro Hockey Tour.

Games against Canada was not included in the 1998–99 Euro Hockey Tour.

== Standings ==
Pos	Team	Pld	W	D	L	GF	GA	GD	Pts
1	Finland	4	3	0	1	14	10	+4	9
2	Sweden	4	2	1	1	14	7	+7	7
3	Canada	4	2	0	2	6	9	−3	6
4	Czech Republic	4	1	1	2	8	9	−1	4
5	Russia	4	1	0	3	8	15	−7	3

Source: swehockey

== Games ==
All times are local. Stockholm – (Central European Time – UTC+1)

9 February 1999; 15:30	Russia	4-5 (2-2,1-1,1-2)	Czech Republic	Globen, Stockholm; Attendance: 832

Game reference

Referees:
(Sweden) Christer Lärking
(Sweden) Ulf Rådbjer

	0-1	03:07 – Pavel Patera (Jiri Vykoukal)
03:21 – Roman Lyashenko (Dmitri Vlasenkov)	1-1
10:20 – Roman Lyashenko (Maxim Sushinsky)	2-1
	2-2	17:41 – Tomas Kucharcik (Jan Čaloun)
	2-3	23:51 – Tomáš Vlasák (Martin Štěpánek) (PP)

12 min
Penalties
10 min
25
Shots
25

9 February 1999; 19:00	Canada	1-4 (0-1, 1-2, 0-1)	Sweden	Globen, Stockholm; Attendance: 12,237

Game reference

Referees:
(Switzerland) Danny Kurmann
(Sweden) Thomas Andersson

	0-1	06:25 – Christer Olsson (Ove Molin, Jan Larsson)
	0-2	24:43 – Magnus Wernblom (Jörgen Jönsson)
31:21 – Shawn Heins (Sergio Momesso)	1-2
	1-3	34:09 – Jan Larsson (Anders Huusko)
	1-4	40:42 – Niclas Hävelid (Christer Olsson, Per Svartvadet)

20 min
Penalties
20 min
27
Shots
34

10 February 1999; 19:00	Finland	3-2 (1-0, 1-0, 1-2)	Czech Republic	Globen, Stockholm; Attendance: 3,748

Game reference

Referees:
(Switzerland) Danny Kurmann
(Sweden) Thomas Andersson

03:28 – Marko Tuomainen (Janne Ojanen) (PP)	1-0
25:7 – Marko Kiprusoff (Juha Ikonen)	2-0
48:18 – Kimmo Rintanen (Janne Ojanen) (PP)	3-0
	3-1	53:49 – Viktor Ujčík (PP)
	3-2	59:47 – Martin Prochazka (Pavel Patera, Jan Čaloun) (PP)

14 min
Penalties
10 min
22
Shots
22

11 February 1999; 15:30	Finland	2-3 (1-1,0-2,1-0)	Canada	Globen, Stockholm; Attendance: 1,151

Game reference

Referees:
(Sweden) Ulf Rådbjer
(Sweden) Christer Lärking

	0-1	11:32 – Paul DiPietro (Justin Cardwell, Bob Maudie) (PP)
16:52 – Mika Alatalo (Janne Ojanen) (PP)	1-1
	1-2	21:02 – Dale McTavish (Justin Cardwell) (PP)
	1-3	25:00 – Dwayne Norris (Sergio Momasso)
50:16 – Marku Hurme (Marko Tuomainen)	2-3

12 min
Penalties
18 min
34
Shots
25

11 February 1999; 19:00	Sweden	5-0 (1-0, 1-0, 3-0)	Russia	Globen, Stockholm; Attendance: 9,931

Game reference

Referees:
(Switzerland) Danny Kurmann
(Sweden) Lars-Johan Ryhed,

13:13 – Jörgen Jönsson (Samuel Påhlsson)	1-0
24:34 – Per Svartvadet (Jörgen Jönsson)	2-0
47:20 – Magnus Wernblom (Per Eklund, Nichlas Falk)	3-0
51:02 – Magnus Wernblom (Christer Olsson, Per Svartvadet)	4-0
51:39 – Anders Huusko (Janne Larsson, Ove Molin)	5-0

6 min
Penalties
6 min
32
Shots
13

12 February 1999; 19:00	Czech Republic	0-1 (0-0, 0-0, 0-1)	Canada	Globen, Stockholm; Attendance: 5,853

Game reference
			Referees: (Sweden) Ulf Rådbjer (Finland) Rami Savolainen
0-1 / 49:43 – Casson Masters (Ryan Foster)			Referees: (Sweden) Ulf Rådbjer (Finland) Rami Savolainen
14 min	Penalties	18 min	Referees: (Sweden) Ulf Rådbjer (Finland) Rami Savolainen
38	Shots	22	Referees: (Sweden) Ulf Rådbjer (Finland) Rami Savolainen

13 February 1999; 12:00	Russia	1-4 (0-2, 1-1, 0-1)	Finland	Globen, Stockholm; Attendance: 4,192

Game reference

Referees:
(Sweden) Peter Andersson
(Sweden) Christer Lärking

	0-1	11:18 – Antti Törmänen (Jussi Tarvainen)
	0-2	18:50 – Marku Hurme (Jere Karalahti, Marko Tuomainen) (PP)
12:12 – Mikhail Sarmatin	1-2
	1-3	37:21 – Erik Kakko (Tony Virta)
	1-4	47:26 – Peter Ahola (Antti Törmänen, Tony Virta)

6 min
Penalties
8 min
25
Shots
27

13 February 1999; 15:30	Czech Republic	1-1 (1-0, 0-1, 0-0)	Sweden	Globen, Stockholm; Attendance: 13,850

Game reference
			Referees: (Sweden) Robert Lathi (Finland) Rami Savolainen
08:50 – Viktor Ujčík (František Kaberle, Libor Procházka) (PP) / 1-0; / 1-1 / 21:17 – Kim Johnsson (Nichlas Falk)			Referees: (Sweden) Robert Lathi (Finland) Rami Savolainen
29 min	Penalties	8 min	Referees: (Sweden) Robert Lathi (Finland) Rami Savolainen
18	Shots	39	Referees: (Sweden) Robert Lathi (Finland) Rami Savolainen

14 February 1999; 13:00	Canada	1-3 (0-0, 1-1, 0-2)	Russia	Globen, Stockholm; Attendance: 1,866

Game reference

Referees:
(Sweden) Robert Lahti
(Sweden) Peter Andersson

24:33 – Sergio Momesso (hawn Heins, Dale McTavish)	1-0
	1-1	27:29 – Oleg Petrov (Alexander Barkov, Andrei Yakhanov) (PP)
	1-2	48:01 – Alexei Kudashov (Oleg Sjevtsov) (PP)
	1-3	49:54 – Dmitri Bykov (Alexander Barkov)

26 min
Penalties
12 min
18
Shots
25

14 February 1999; 17:00	Sweden	4-5 (0-2, 2-3, 2-0)	Finland	Globen, Stockholm; Attendance: 13,850

Game reference

Referees:
(Sweden) Ulf Rådbjer
(Finland) Rami Savolainen

	0-1	11:09 – Pasi Saarela (Kimmo Rintanen, Aki-Petteri Berg)
	0-2	17:56 – Jere Karalahti (Toni Sihvonen)
23:41 – Jesper Mattsson (Ove Molin, Jan Larsson)	1-2
	1-3	25:0% – Mikko Eloranta (Mika Alatalo, Marko Kiprusoff)
27:43 – Pär Djoos (Hans Jonsson, Ove Molin) (PP)	2-3
	2-4	34:35 – Marko Tuomainen (Toni Sihvonen, Pasi Petriläinen)
	2-5	35:03 – Pasi Saarela (Antti Törmänen)
42:53 – Niclas Hävelid (Samuel Påhlsson)	3-5
59:37 – Pär Djoos (Jan Larsson) (PP)	4-5

41 min
Penalties
46 min
35
Shots
27

== Scoring leaders ==
Pos	Player	Country	GP	G	A	Pts	+/−	PIM	POS
1	Marko Tuomainen	Finland	4	2	3	5	+2	25	RW
2	Jan Larsson	Sweden	4	1	4	5	+3	0	CE
3	Ove Molin	Sweden	4	0	4	4	+3	2	RW
4	Viktor Ujčík	Czech Republic	4	3	0	3	+2	2	RW
5	Magnus Wernblom	Sweden	4	3	0	3	+2	35	RW

GP = Games played; G = Goals; A = Assists; Pts = Points; +/− = Plus/minus; PIM = Penalties in minutes; POS = Position
Source: swehockey

== Goaltending leaders ==
Pos	Player	Country	TOI	GA	GAA	Sv%	SO
1	Roman Čechmánek	Czech Republic	118:47	4	2.02	93.44	0
2	Andrew Verner	Canada	240:00	9	2.25	93.13	0
3	Miikka Kiprusoff	Finland	118:55	4	2.02	92.00	1
4	Petter Rönnquist	Sweden	239:25	7	1.75	91.76	0
5	Ari Sulander	Finland	120:00	6	3.00	89.47	1
6	Milan Hnilička	Czech Republic	118:39	5	2.53	89.36	0
7	Oleg Shevtsov	Russia	220:00	13	3.55	86.60	0

TOI = Time on ice (minutes:seconds); SA = Shots against; GA = Goals against; GAA = Goals Against Average; Sv% = Save percentage; SO = Shutouts
Source: swehockey

== Tournament awards ==
The tournament directorate named the following players in the tournament 1999:

- Best goalkeeper: (Czech Republic) Roman Čechmánek
- Best defenceman: (Finland) jere Karalahti
- Best forward: (Sweden) Jörgen Jönsson

Media All-Star Team:

- Goaltender: (Sweden) Petter Rönnquist
- Defence: (Sweden) Christer Olsson, (Czech Republic) Frantisek Kaberle
- Forwards: (Sweden) Magnus Wernblom, (Sweden) Jörgen Jönsson, (Finland) Marko Tuomainen
