= 1998 Baltika Cup =

Tournament details
- Host country: Russia
- City: Moscow
- Venue: 1 (in 1 host city)
- Dates: 15–20 December 1998
- Teams: 5

Final positions
- Champions: Sweden (2nd title)
- Runners-up: Czech Republic
- Third place: Finland
- Fourth place: Russia

Tournament statistics
- Games played: 10
- Goals scored: 58 (5.8 per game)
- Attendance: 23,700 (2,370 per game)
- Scoring leader(s): (Czech Republic) Tomáš Vlasák (Czech Republic) Jan Čaloun (5 points)

Awards
- MVP: (Sweden) Jan Larsson

The 1998 Baltika Cup was played between 15 and 20 December 1998. The Czech Republic, Finland, Sweden and Russia played a round-robin for a total of three games per team and six games in total. All of the matches were played in Luzhniki Palace of Sports in Moscow, Russia. Sweden won the tournament. The tournament was part of the 1998–99 Euro Hockey Tour.

Games against Canada was not included in the 1998–99 Euro Hockey Tour.

== Standings ==
Pos	Team	Pld	W	D	L	GF	GA	GD	Pts
1	Sweden	4	4	0	0	14	9	+5	12
2	Czech Republic	4	3	0	1	15	8	+7	9
3	Finland	4	1	1	2	9	10	−1	4
4	Russia	4	1	1	2	11	13	−2	4
5	Canada	4	0	0	4	9	18	−9	0

Source: swehockey

== Games ==
All times are local. Moscow – (Moscow Time – UTC+4)

15 December 1998; 15:00	Sweden	3-2 (1-0, 2-0, 0-2)	Finland	Luzhniki Palace of Sports, Moscow; Attendance: 1,000

Game reference

Petter Rönnquist
Goalies
Miikka Kiprusoff Juha Ikonen
Referee:
(Russia) Konstantin Komissarov
Linesmen:
(Russia) Alexei Vasiliev
(Russia) Igor Khimich

Per Eklund (Nord) – 16:03	1-0
Wernblom (Mattsson) – 21:47	2-0
Wernblom (Karlsson) – 31:18	3-0
	3-1	56:39 – Ikonen (Pirjetä)
	3-2	58:51 – Nurminen (Pirjetä) (PP)

20 min
Penalties
8 min
30
Shots
36

15 December 1998; 18:30	Russia	3-1 (1-0, 0-1, 2-0)	Canada	Luzhniki Palace of Sports, Moscow

16 December 1998; 15:00	Canada	3-4 (1-2, 0-2, 2-0)	Sweden	Luzhniki Palace of Sports, Moscow; Attendance: 600

Game reference

Fred Brathwaite
Goalies
Petter Rönnquist
Referee:
(Russia) Konstantin Komissarov
Linesmen:
(Russia) Vyacheslav Bulanov
(Russia) Pavel Makarov

	0-1	05:20 – Huokko (Molin) (PP)
Wright (Adduono, Szysky) (PP) – 09:31	1-1
	1-2	11:15 – Larsson (Hellkvist)
	1-3	26:52 – Molin (Jesper Matsson, Larsson)
	1-4	36:47 – Hellkvist (Molin, Larsson)
Peters (Robinson, Wright) – 54:18	2-4
Maudie (Racine) – 59:00	3-4

16 min
Penalties
39 min
58
Shots
55

16 December 1998; 15:00	Czech Republic	3-0 (1-0, 2-0, 0-0)	Finland	Luzhniki Palace of Sports, Moscow; Attendance: 1,500

Game reference

Jaroslav Kameš
Goalies
Vesa Toskala

Vlasák – 05:00	1-0
Vlasák – 21:00	2-0
Hlaváč – 38:00	3-0

10 min
Penalties
12 min

17 December 1998; 18:30	Russia	3-5 (0-0, 3-1, 0-4)	Czech Republic	Luzhniki Palace of Sports, Moscow; Attendance: 8,000

Game reference

Maxim Sokolov Oleg Shevtsov
Goalies
Milan Hnilička

Vlasenkov – 28:00	1-0
Barkov – 30:00	2-0
	2-1	30:00 – Vlasák
Kudashov – 33:00	3-1
	3-2	42:00 – Kaberle
	3-3	44:00 – Hlaváč
	3-4	46:00 – Meluzín
	3-5	47:00 – Čaloun

12 min
Penalties
14 min

18 December 1998; 18:30	Finland	5-2 (1-0, 2-0, 2-2)	Canada	Luzhniki Palace of Sports, Moscow

Game reference

19 December 1998; 13:00	Finland	2-2 (0-0, 0-1, 2-1)	Russia	Luzhniki Palace of Sports, Moscow

Game reference

19 December 1998; 17:00	Czech Republic	1-2 (0-2, 1-0, 0-0)	Sweden	Luzhniki Palace of Sports, Moscow; Attendance: 1,800

Game reference

Jaroslav Kameš
Goalies
Petter Rönnquist
Referee:
(Russia) Aleksandr Zhaytsev
Linesmen:
(Russia) Vyacheslav Bulanov
(Russia) Pavel Makarov

	0-1	05:32 – Mattsson (Johnsson, Wernblom)
	0-2	13:15 – Karlsson (Johnsson)
Čaloun (Výborný) – 35:00	1-2

4 min
Penalties
2 min
11
Shots
28

20 December 1998; 13:00	Sweden	5-3 (2-2, 2-0, 1-1)	Russia	Luzhniki Palace of Sports, Moscow; Attendance: 9,000

Game reference

Magnus Eriksson
Goalies
Maxim Sokolov
Referee:
(Canada) Adam Donland
Linesmen:
(Russia) Igor Khimich
(Russia) Pavel Makarov

	0-1	04:27 – Gusmanov
Olsson (Huokko, Larsson) (PP) – 09:41	1-1
	1-2	18:40 – Barkov (Kharitonov, Epanchintsev)
Johnsson – 19:29	2-2
Johansson (Wernblom) – 21:50	3-2
Nordfeldt (Sundin, Thuresson) – 23:26	4-2
Påhlsson (Huokko) – 42:56	5-2
	5-3	54:26 – Kudashov (Bautin, Gusmanov)

12 min
Penalties
4 min
17
Shots
36

20 December 1998; 17:00	Czech Republic	6-3 (2-1, 3-2, 1-0)	Canada	Luzhniki Palace of Sports, Moscow; Attendance: 1,800

Game reference
Milan Hnilička	Goalies	Fred Brathwaite
Štěpánek – 07:00 / Ujčík – 09:00 / Čaloun – 24:00 / Hlinka – 28:00 / Meluzín – 34:00 / Vlasák – 57:00 / Goals / 20:00 – Lindsay / 24:00 – Cardwell / 33:00 – Peters
22 min	Penalties	22 min

== Scoring leaders ==
Pos	Player	Country	GP	G	A	Pts	+/−	PIM	POS
1	Tomáš Vlasák	Czech Republic	4	4	1	5	+6	0	F
2	Jan Čaloun	Czech Republic	4	3	2	5	+2	2	F
3	Alexei Kudashov	Russia	4	3	1	4	+0	2	F
3	Magnus Wernblom	Sweden	4	2	2	4	+2	5	F
5	Jan Larsson	Sweden	4	1	3	4	0	2	F

GP = Games played; G = Goals; A = Assists; Pts = Points; +/− = Plus/minus; PIM = Penalties in minutes; POS = Position
Source: quanthockey

== Tournament awards ==
The tournament directorate named the following players in the tournament 1998:

- Best goaltender: (Finland) Vesa Toskala
- Best defenceman: (Czech Republic) František Kaberle
- Best forward: (Sweden) Andreas Karlsson
- Most Valuable Player: (Sweden) Jan Larsson
