= List of Olympic men's ice hockey players for the Czech Republic =

The list of Olympic men's ice hockey players for the Czech Republic consisted of 103 skaters and 9 goaltenders. Men's ice hockey tournaments have been staged at the Olympic Games since 1920 (it was introduced at the 1920 Summer Olympics, and was permanently added to the Winter Olympic Games in 1924). The Czech Republic has participated in seven tournaments, the first in 1994 and most recently in 2018, though from 1920 until 1992 they participated as part of Czechoslovakia. The Czech Republic has won two medals: a gold in 1998 and a bronze in 2006.

Jaromír Jágr has played in the most Olympic tournaments, 5, and also played in the most games, with 28. Jágr has scored the most goals, 9, assists, 14, and points, 23. Seven players — Dominik Hašek, Milan Hejduk, Jágr, Robert Lang. Martin Ručinský, Jaroslav Špaček and Martin Straka — were on both of the Czech Republic's medal-winning teams. Hašek has been inducted into both the Hockey Hall of Fame and International Ice Hockey Hall of Fame, the only player from the Czech Republic in either.

== Key ==
General terms
Term	Definition
GP	Games played
HHOF	Hockey Hall of Fame
IIHFHOF	International Ice Hockey Federation Hall of Fame
Olympics	Number of Olympic Games tournaments
Ref(s)	Reference(s)

== Goaltenders ==
Goaltenders
Player	Olympics	Tournament(s)	GP	W	L	T	Min	SO	GA	GAA	Medals	Notes	Ref(s)
Petr Bříza	1	1994	7	5	2	0	–	0	19	–		Czechoslovakia 1992	
Pavel Francouz	1	2018	6	4	2	0	–	0	14	–			
Dominik Hašek	3	1998, 2002, 2006	11	7	3	0	–	3	14	–	Gold (1998); Bronze (2006)	HHOF (2014); IIHFHOF (2015); Czechoslovakia 1988	
Milan Hnilička	1	2006	3	1	2	0	–	0	6	–	Bronze (2006)		
Jakub Kovář	1	2014	1	0	1	0	–	0	3	–			
Ondřej Pavelec	1	2014	4	2	2	0	–	0	10	–			
Alexander Salák	1	2014	2	0	2	0	–	0	2	–			
Roman Turek	1	1994	2	2	0	0	–	0	4	–			
Tomáš Vokoun	2	2006, 2010	12	6	6	0	–	1	23	–	Bronze (2006)		

== Skaters ==
Skaters
Player	Olympics	Tournaments	GP	G	A	P	PIM	Medals	Notes	Ref(s)
Jan Alinč	1	1994	6	2	0	2	4			
Michal Barinka	1	2014	3	0	0	0	2			
Josef Beránek	1	1998	6	1	0	1	4	Gold (1998)		
Michal Birner	1	2018	6	0	3	3	0			
Miroslav Blaťák	1	2010	4	0	2	2	2			
Jan Bulis	1	2006	8	0	0	0	10	Bronze (2006)		
Petr Čajánek	3	2002, 2006, 2010	16	1	0	1	10	Bronze (2006)		
Jan Čaloun	1	1998	6	0	0	0	6	Gold (1998)		
Roman Červenka	3	2010, 2014, 2018	16	5	3	8	6			
Jiří Doležal	1	1994	8	3	1	4	6		Czechoslovakia 1988	
Jiří Dopita	2	1998, 2002	10	3	4	7	2	Gold (1998)		
Radek Dvořák	1	2002	4	0	0	0	0			
Patrik Eliáš	4	2002, 2006, 2010, 2014	13	3	4	7	4	Bronze (2006)		
Martin Erat	4	2006, 2010, 2014, 2018	24	2	3	5	10	Bronze (2006)		
Tomáš Fleischmann	1	2010	5	1	2	3	2			
Michael Frolík	1	2014	5	0	0	0	0			
Pavel Geffert	1	1994	5	3	2	5	2			
Radko Gudas	1	2014	3	0	0	0	4			
Roman Hamrlík	2	1998, 2002	10	1	1	2	4	Gold (1998)		
Martin Hanzal	1	2014	4	0	1	1	4			
Martin Havlát	2	2002, 2010	9	3	3	6	27			
Jan Hejda	1	2010	5	0	0	0	4			
Milan Hejduk	3	1998, 2002, 2010	16	3	1	4	4	Gold (1998); Bronze (2006)		
Aleš Hemský	2	2006, 2014	13	4	3	7	2	Bronze (2006)		
Roman Horák	1	1994	8	3	1	4	2			
Roman Horák	1	2018	6	0	3	3	0			
Miloslav Hořava	1	1994	6	0	0	0	8		Czechoslovakia 1984, 1988, 1992	
Martin Hosták	1	1994	6	1	0	1	0			
Petr Hrbek	1	1994	8	2	3	5	6		Czechoslovakia 1992	
Jan Hrdina	1	2002	4	0	0	0	0			
Jaromír Jágr	5	1998, 2002, 2006, 2010, 2014	28	9	14	23	20	Gold (1998); Bronze (2006)		
Otakar Janecký	1	1994	8	2	5	7	6		Czechoslovakia 1992	
Michal Jordan	1	2018	5	1	0	1	2			
František Kaberle	1	2006	8	0	1	1	6	Bronze (2006)		
Tomáš Kaberle	4	2002, 2006, 2010, 2014	22	3	8	11	4	Bronze (2006)		
Drahomír Kadlec	1	1994	8	0	2	2	4		Czechoslovakia 1992	
Tomáš Kapusta	1	1994	7	0	0	0	2			
Kamil Kašťák	1	1994	7	1	3	4	2		Czechoslovakia 1992	
Jan Kolář	1	2018	6	1	2	3	4			
Aleš Kotalík	1	2006	4	0	0	0	0	Bronze (2006)		
Petr Koukal	1	2018	6	1	0	1	2			
Jan Kovář	1	2018	6	3	2	5	2			
Lukáš Krajíček	1	2014	1	0	0	0	0			
David Krejčí	2	2010, 2014	10	3	3	6	6			
Filip Kuba	2	2006, 2010	13	1	1	2	0	Bronze (2006)		
Dominik Kubalík	1	2018	5	2	0	2	2			
Pavel Kubina	3	2002, 2006, 2010	17	1	2	3	14	Bronze (2006)		
František Kučera	1	1998	6	0	0	0	0	Gold (1998)		
Jiří Kučera	1	1994	8	6	2	8	4			
Tomáš Kundrátek	1	2018	5	1	0	1	0			
Robert Lang	3	1998, 2002, 2006	18	1	9	10	6	Gold (1998); Bronze (2006)	Czechoslovakia 1992	
Marek Malík	1	2006	8	0	0	0	8	Bronze (2006)		
Tomáš Mertl	1	2018	6	0	1	1	0			
Milan Michálek	2	2010, 2014	10	1	1	2	0			
Zbyněk Michálek	2	2010, 2014	10	0	1	1	4			
David Moravec	1	1998	6	0	1	1	2	Gold (1998)		
Vojtěch Mozík	1	2018	6	0	2	2	6			
Jakub Nakládal	1	2018	6	0	2	2	6			
Petr Nedvěd	1	2014	5	0	1	1	4		Canada 1994	
Ondřej Němec	1	2018	6	0	0	0	2			
Jiří Novotný	1	2014	1	0	0	0	0			
Rostislav Olesz	1	2006	8	0	0	0	2	Bronze (2006)		
Ondřej Palát	1	2014	3	0	0	0	0			
Pavel Patera	2	1998, 2002	8	2	3	5	2	Gold (1998)		
Tomáš Plekanec	2	2010, 2014	10	4	3	7	2			
Roman Polák	1	2010	5	0	0	0	4			
Adam Polášek	1	2018	6	0	1	1	2			
Libor Procházka	1	1984	6	0	0	0	0	Gold (1998)		
Martin Procházka	1	1998	6	1	1	2	0	Gold (1998)		
Václav Prospal	1	2006	8	4	2	6	2	Bronze (2006)		
Lukáš Radil	1	2018	6	0	0	0	4			
Robert Reichel	2	1998, 2002	10	4	0	4	2	Gold (1998)		
Michal Řepík	1	2018	6	3	2	5	0			
Tomáš Rolinek	1	2010	5	1	0	1	0			
Michal Rozsíval	1	2014	4	0	0	0	0			
Martin Ručinský	3	1998, 2002, 2006	18	4	7	11	6	Gold (1998); Bronze (2006)		
Martin Růžička	1	2018	5	1	1	2	2			
Vladimír Růžička	1	1998	6	3	0	3	0	Gold (1998)	Czechoslovakia 1984, 1988	
Bedřich Ščerban	1	1994	8	0	1	1	10		Czechoslovakia 1988, 1992	
Jiří Sekáč	1	2018	5	0	1	1	2			
Martin Škoula	1	2002	4	0	0	0	0			
Jiří Šlégr	1	1998	6	1	0	1	8	Gold (1998)	Czechoslovakia 1992	
Richard Šmehlík	2	1998, 2002	10	0	1	1	8	Gold (1998)	Czechoslovakia 1992	
Ladislav Šmíd	1	2014	4	0	0	0	2			
Jaroslav Špaček	3	1998, 2002, 2006	18	0	1	1	6	Gold (1998); Bronze (2006)		
Tomáš Sršeň	1	1994	8	2	3	5	8			
Antonín Stavjaňa	1	1994	8	0	0	0	2		Czechoslovakia 1988	
Martin Straka	2	1998, 2006	14	3	8	11	6	Gold (1998); Bronze (2006)		
Petr Svoboda	1	1998	6	1	1	2	39	Gold (1998)		
Michal Sýkora	1	2002	1	0	0	0	0			
Petr Sýkora	1	2002	4	1	0	1	0			
Radek Ťoupal	1	1994	6	1	0	1	4		Czechoslovakia 1992	
Josef Vašíček	1	2010	5	0	0	0	2			
Jiří Veber	1	1994	3	0	0	0	2			
Ondřej Vitásek	1	2018	2	0	0	0	0			
Michal Vondrka	1	2018	1	0	0	0	0			
Jan Vopat	1	1994	8	0	1	1	8			
Jakub Voráček	1	2014	5	1	1	2	2			
David Výborný	1	2006	8	1	3	4	0	Bronze (2006)		
Jiří Vykoukal	1	1994	8	1	3	4	4			
Richard Žemlička	1	1994	8	3	4	7	8		Czechoslovakia 1992	
Marek Židlický	3	2006, 2010, 2014	17	6	8	14	26	Bronze (2006)		
Tomáš Zohorna	1	2018	5	0	0	0	2			
