= 2001 IIHF World Championship final =

Ice hockey match

	1	2	3	OT	Total
Czech Republic	0	0	2	1	3
Finland	1	1	0	0	2
- Date: 13 May 2001
- City: Hanover
- Attendance: 10,513

The 2001 IIHF World Championship final was an ice hockey match that took place on 13 May 2001 in Hanover, Germany, to determine the winner of the 2001 IIHF World Championship. The Czech Republic defeated Finland to win its fourth championship.

== Details ==
13 May 2001; 19:00	Czech Republic	3–2 (0–1, 0–1, 2–0) (OT 1–0)	Finland	Hannover; Attendance: 10,513

Game reference

Referees:
Radbjer
Norrman, Nansen

	0–1	17:35 Lind (Ylönen, S. Kapanen)
	0–2	38:39 Ylönen (Salo, Pärssinen)
44:31 Procházka (Patera, Moravec)	1–2
54:05 Dopita (Čajánek, Ujčík)	2–2
70:38 Moravec (Patera)	3–2

8 min
Penalties
5 min
43
Shots
32

== See also ==
- 2001 IIHF World Championship
- Czech Republic men's national ice hockey team
- Finland men's national ice hockey team
