= Ice hockey at the 1998 Winter Olympics =

Ice hockey at the XVIII Olympic Winter Games
- Venues: The Big Hat; Aqua Wing Arena
- Dates: 7–22 February 1998
- Competitors: 426 (306 men, 120 women) from 15 nations

Men's ice hockey at the XVIII Olympic Winter Games

Medalists
1st place, gold medalist(s)		Czech Republic
2nd place, silver medalist(s)		Russia
3rd place, bronze medalist(s)		Finland

Women's ice hockey at the XVIII Olympic Winter Games

Medalists
1st place, gold medalist(s)		United States
2nd place, silver medalist(s)		Canada
3rd place, bronze medalist(s)		Finland

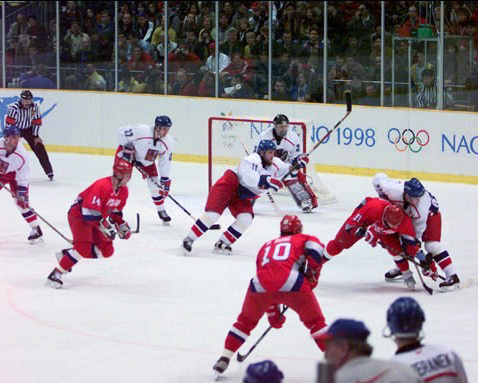
Russia vs Czech Republic in the men's gold medal game

Ice hockey at the 1998 Winter Olympics was played at The Big Hat and Aqua Wing Arena in Nagano, Japan. Isao Kataoka served as the chairman of the ice hockey competition committee for the 1998 Winter Olympics, the first Olympics to include active National Hockey League players, and the first Olympics to include a women's tournament.

== Medal summary ==
=== Medal table ===
Rank	Nation	Gold	Silver	Bronze	Total
1	Czech Republic	1	0	0	1
1	United States	1	0	0	1
3	Canada	0	1	0	1
3	Russia	0	1	0	1
5	Finland	0	0	2	2
Totals (5 entries)		2	2	2	6

=== Medalists ===
Event	Gold	Silver	Bronze
Men's	Czech Republic; Josef Beránek; Jan Čaloun; Roman Čechmánek; Jiří Dopita; Roman Hamrlík; Dominik Hašek; Milan Hejduk; Milan Hnilička; Jaromír Jágr; František Kučera; Robert Lang; David Moravec; Pavel Patera; Libor Procházka; Martin Procházka; Robert Reichel; Martin Ručinský; Vladimír Růžička; Jiří Šlégr; Richard Šmehlík; Jaroslav Špaček; Martin Straka; Petr Svoboda	Russia; Pavel Bure; Valeri Bure; Sergei Fedorov; Sergei Gonchar; Alexei Gusarov; Valeri Kamensky; Darius Kasparaitis; Andrei Kovalenko; Igor Kravchuk; Sergei Krivokrasov; Boris Mironov; Dmitri Mironov; Alexei Morozov; Sergei Nemchinov; Oleg Shevtsov; Mikhail Shtalenkov; German Titov; Andrei Trefilov; Alexei Yashin; Dmitri Yushkevich; Valeri Zelepukin; Alexei Zhitnik; Alexei Zhamnov	Finland; Aki-Petteri Berg; Tuomas Grönman; Raimo Helminen; Sami Kapanen; Saku Koivu; Jari Kurri; Janne Laukkanen; Jere Lehtinen; Juha Lind; Jyrki Lumme; Jarmo Myllys; Mika Nieminen; Janne Niinimaa; Teppo Numminen; Ville Peltonen; Kimmo Rintanen; Teemu Selänne; Ari Sulander; Jukka Tammi; Esa Tikkanen; Kimmo Timonen; Antti Törmänen; Juha Ylönen
Women's	United States; Chris Bailey; Laurie Baker; Alana Blahoski; Lisa Brown-Miller; Karyn Bye; Colleen Coyne; Sara Decosta; Tricia Dunn; Cammi Granato; Katie King; Shelley Looney; Sue Merz; Allison Mleczko; Tara Mounsey; Vicki Movsessian; Angela Ruggiero; Jenny Potter; Sarah Tueting; Gretchen Ulion; Sandra Whyte	Canada; Jennifer Botterill; Therese Brisson; Cassie Campbell; Judy Diduck; Nancy Drolet; Lori Dupuis; Danielle Goyette; Geraldine Heaney; Jayna Hefford; Becky Kellar; Kathy McCormack; Karen Nystrom; Lesley Reddon; Manon Rhéaume; France St-Louis; Laura Schuler; Fiona Smith; Vicky Sunohara; Hayley Wickenheiser; Stacy Wilson	Finland; Sari Fisk; Satu Huotari; Kirsi Hänninen; Marianne Ihalainen; Johanna Ikonen; Sari Krooks; Emma Laaksonen; Sanna Lankosaari; Katja Lehto; Marika Lehtimäki; Riikka Nieminen; Tuula Puputti; Marja-Helena Pälvilä; Karoliina Rantamäki; Tiia Reima; Katja Riipi; Päivi Salo; Maria Selin; Liisa-Maria Sneck; Petra Vaarakallio

== Men's tournament ==
=== Participating nations ===
Preliminary group A	Preliminary group B	Group C	Group D
Italy; Austria; Slovakia; Kazakhstan	France; Germany; Japan; Belarus	Finland; Czech Republic; Russia	Sweden; Canada; United States

== Women's tournament ==
This is the first year that women competed in Olympic hockey.

=== Participating nations ===
- Canada
- United States
- Finland
- China
- Sweden
- Japan
