= Geoff Peters =

British commentator and broadcaster

Geoff Peters is a British sports commentator and broadcaster who works for Talksport radio.

Peters joined talkSPORT in 1999, after spending four years at BBC Radio Leicester between 1992 and 1996. He also worked for Sky News Radio, Independent Radio News, Century 106 and BBC Radio Cambridgeshire. In 1998, Peters also released a book titled: O'Neill: Crest Of A Wave. The book is a biographical overview of football manager Martin O'Neill's first two years in charge at Leicester City.

Whilst at talkSPORT, Peters has read sports bulletins and presented a number of programmes, including rugby league and cricket shows, plus the Sunday afternoon football phone-in 'Call the Doc', where he worked alongside former Manchester United and Chelsea Manager Tommy Docherty in 2001. He was also a group stage commentator for talkSPORT, alongside Jason Cundy and Micky Quinn during the 2006 World Cup in Germany.

Peters presented talkSPORT's Up The League show, which focused on the English Championship, as well League One and League Two. The show was broadcast between August and May during the domestic football season from 2013 until the summer of 2016, when he became host of Early Breakfast four days a week. Peters is also an occasional presenter of the overnight show, Extra Time.

He has also commentated on the English Premier League, FA Cup and European competitions for radio and TV world feeds. In 2015, he began commentating and presenting for Leicester City's online service, Foxes Player HD.

In addition to his commercial radio work, Peters is also a DJ in the UK and occasionally on the Spanish island of Ibiza.
