= Sergei Petrenko =

Ukrainian-Russian ice hockey player (born 1968)

- Born: September 10, 1968 (age 57) Kharkiv, Ukrainian SSR, Soviet Union
- Height: 6 ft 0 in (183 cm)
- Weight: 176 lb (80 kg; 12 st 8 lb)
- Position: Left wing
- Shot: Left
- Played for: HC Dynamo Moscow; HC Davos; HC Vítkovice; Metallurg Novokuznetsk; Severstal Cherepovets; HC Sibir Novosibirsk; Buffalo Sabres
- National team: Unified Team and Russia
- NHL draft: 168th overall, 1993; Buffalo Sabres
- Playing career: 1987–2004

Olympic medal record

Men's Ice Hockey
Gold medal – first place	1992 Albertville	Ice Hockey

Serhiy Anatoliiovych Petrenko (Russian: Сергей Анатолъевич Петренко, Ukrainian: Сергіӣ Анатолійович Петренко; born September 10, 1968) is a Ukrainian-Russian retired ice hockey left wing. He was drafted in the seventh round, 168th overall, by the Buffalo Sabres in the 1993 NHL entry draft and played 14 games for Buffalo during the 1993–94 NHL season.

== Career ==
Petrenko spent the majority of his career playing in the Russian Hockey Super League. He played six seasons for HC Dynamo Moscow, and was a member of the Unified Team which won the gold medal at the 1992 Winter Olympics, before going to North America to join the Sabres' organization. He appeared in 81 games over two seasons with Buffalo's American Hockey League affiliate, the Rochester Americans; he also appeared in 14 NHL games with the Sabres during the 1993–94 season, recording four assists.

Following his brief North American career, Petrenko played three more seasons with Dynamo Moscow, one each in Switzerland's Nationalliga A and the Czech Republic's Czech Extraliga, and then spent the final three seasons of his career with three different Russian Super League teams.

In 1993, he won the World Championships with the Russian national team.

In 1991, Petrenko won Tampere Cup. He also won 4 national championships.

== Career statistics ==
=== Regular season and playoffs ===
			Regular season					Playoffs
Season	Team	League	GP	G	A	Pts	PIM	GP	G	A	Pts	PIM
1986–87	Dynamo Kharkiv	USSR II	44	8	14	22	18	—	—	—	—	—
1987–88	Dynamo Moscow	USSR	31	2	5	7	4	—	—	—	—	—
1988–89	Dynamo Moscow	USSR	23	4	6	10	6	—	—	—	—	—
1989–90	Dynamo Moscow	USSR	33	5	4	9	8	—	—	—	—	—
1989–90	Dynamo Moscow 2	USSR III	2	1	1	2	0	—	—	—	—	—
1990–91	Dynamo Moscow	USSR	43	14	13	27	10	—	—	—	—	—
1990–91	Dynamo Moscow 2	USSR III	1	0	0	0	0	—	—	—	—	—
1991–92	Dynamo Moscow	CIS	25	8	9	17	8	6	1	1	2	2
1992–93	Dynamo Moscow	IHL	36	12	12	24	10	10	4	5	9	6
1993–94	Buffalo Sabres	NHL	14	0	4	4	0	—	—	—	—	—
1993–94	Rochester Americans	AHL	38	16	15	31	8	—	—	—	—	—
1994–95	Rochester Americans	AHL	43	12	16	28	16	—	—	—	—	—
1995–96	Dynamo Moscow	IHL	22	8	7	15	14	—	—	—	—	—
1995–96	Dynamo Moscow 2	RUS II	1	1	1	2	0	—	—	—	—	—
1996–97	HC Davos	NDA	41	19	23	42	20	1	0	0	0	0
1997–98	Dynamo Moscow	RSL	44	14	19	33	8	—	—	—	—	—
1998–99	Dynamo Moscow	RSL	40	11	24	35	36	6	0	1	1	0
1999–2000	HC Vítkovice	ELH	29	7	9	16	4	—	—	—	—	—
1999–2000	Metallurg Novokuznetsk	RSL	11	3	2	5	6	10	1	2	3	4
2000–01	Oji Eagles	JPN	40	14	31	45	—	5	2	4	6	0
2001–02	Severstal Cherepovets	RSL	21	5	4	9	31	—	—	—	—	—
2001–02	Severstal Cherepovets 2	RUS III	3	0	4	4	0	—	—	—	—	—
2002–03	Sibir Novosibirsk	RSL	44	7	10	17	20	—	—	—	—	—
2003–04	Sibir Novosibirsk	RSL	5	0	0	0	0	—	—	—	—	—
2003–04	Molot-Prikamye Perm	RUS II	4	2	0	2	0	—	—	—	—	—
NHL totals			14	0	4	4	0	—	—	—	—	—
USSR/CIS totals			155	33	37	70	36	6	1	1	2	2
RSL totals			165	40	58	98	101	26	5	8	13	10

=== International ===
Year	Team	Event	Place	GP	G	A	Pts	PIM
1988	Soviet Union	WJC	2nd place, silver medalist(s)	7	0	0	0	2
1992	Unified Team	OG	1st place, gold medalist(s)	8	3	2	5	0
1992	Russia	WC	5th	6	1	0	1	2
1993	Russia	WC	1st place, gold medalist(s)	4	0	1	1	2
1997	Russia	WC	4th	4	2	2	4	4
1998	Russia	WC	5th	6	2	4	6	2
1999	Russia	WC	5th	6	2	4	6	2
Senior totals				34	10	13	23	12
