= Jan Huokko =

Swedish ice hockey player and coach (born 1974)

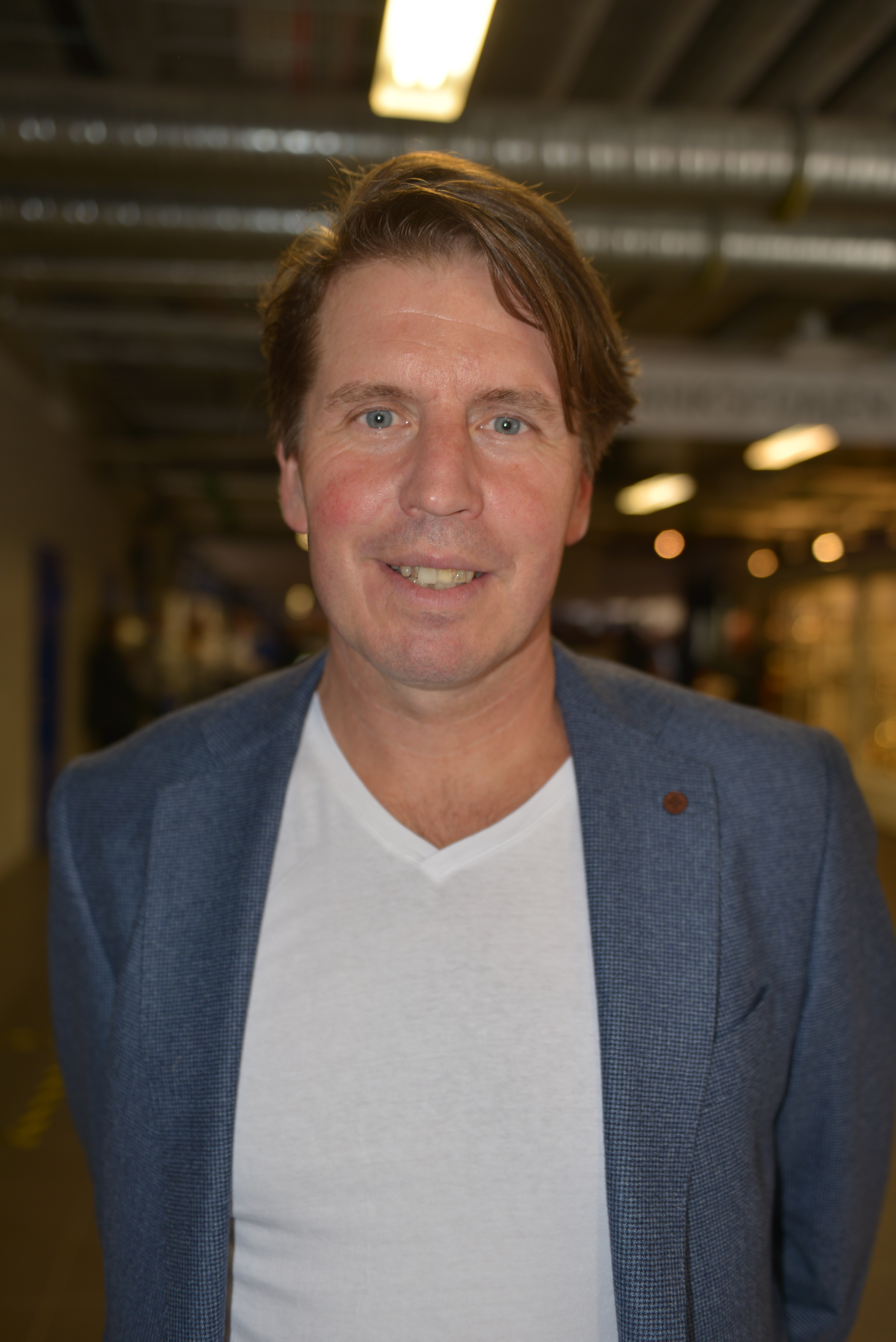
- Jan Huokko, 2019
- Born: June 11, 1974 (age 52) Värmdö, Sweden
- Height: 5 ft 11 in (180 cm)
- Weight: 187 lb (85 kg; 13 st 5 lb)
- Position: Defence
- Shot: Right
- Played for: Leksands IF; AIK IF; SaiPa; Södertälje SK
- National team: Sweden
- NHL draft: Undrafted
- Playing career: 1992–2013

Jan Huokko (born June 11, 1974) is a Swedish former professional ice hockey defenceman. He ended his ice hockey career as head coach for Kramfors-Alliansen of the Swedish Division 2 2012/2013.

During the 1998–99 season Huokko scored 21 goals to set an Elitserien record for most goals by a defenceman in an Elitserien regular season. This record stood until the 2013–14 season when that mark was surpassed by Leksands IF defenceman Patrik Hersley.

Huokko's parents are Finnish.

== International ==
Huokko won a bronze medal with the Sweden men's national ice hockey team at the 1999 IIHF World Championship.

== Career statistics ==
			Regular season					Playoffs
Season	Team	League	GP	G	A	Pts	PIM	GP	G	A	Pts	PIM
1991–92	Leksands IF J18	J18 Elit	—	—	—	—	—	—	—	—	—	—
1991–92	Leksands IF J20	Juniorserien	—	—	—	—	—	—	—	—	—	—
1992–93	Leksands IF J20	Juniorallsvenskan	7	3	1	4	6	—	—	—	—	—
1992–93	Leksands IF	Elitserien	25	0	0	0	14	2	0	0	0	2
1993–94	Leksands IF J20	Juniorallsvenskan	3	3	2	5	0	—	—	—	—	—
1993–94	Leksands IF	Elitserien	27	2	2	4	4	4	0	1	1	0
1994–95	Leksands IF J20	J20 SuperElit	3	2	5	7	4	—	—	—	—	—
1994–95	Leksands IF	Elitserien	40	10	8	18	14	4	0	1	1	6
1995–96	Leksands IF	Elitserien	40	10	11	21	32	5	1	0	1	0
1996–97	Leksands IF	Elitserien	38	5	7	12	38	9	1	3	4	2
1997–98	Leksands IF	Elitserien	44	10	7	17	34	4	1	0	1	4
1998–99	Leksands IF	Elitserien	46	21	16	37	28	4	3	1	4	6
1999–00	Leksands IF	Elitserien	44	10	15	25	30	—	—	—	—	—
2000–01	Leksands IF	Elitserien	44	8	5	13	28	—	—	—	—	—
2001–02	SaiPa	SM-liiga	24	4	4	8	14	—	—	—	—	—
2001–02	AIK IF	Elitserien	25	5	5	10	47	—	—	—	—	—
2002–03	AIK IF	Allsvenskan	36	8	10	18	32	10	4	2	6	10
2003–04	Södertälje SK	Elitserien	49	9	15	24	22	—	—	—	—	—
2004–05	Södertälje SK	Elitserien	50	11	8	19	42	10	0	2	2	6
2005–06	Södertälje SK	Elitserien	50	12	12	24	48	—	—	—	—	—
2006–07	Leksands IF	HockeyAllsvenskan	42	16	21	37	48	10	3	1	4	6
2007–08	Leksands IF	HockeyAllsvenskan	37	16	16	32	30	10	4	1	5	4
2008–09	Leksands IF	HockeyAllsvenskan	31	11	21	32	14	7	0	4	4	2
2009–10	Leksands IF	HockeyAllsvenskan	5	1	1	2	4	—	—	—	—	—
2010–11	Häradsbygdens SS	Division 2	3	2	2	4	0	—	—	—	—	—
2012–13	Kramfors-Alliansen	Hockeyettan	30	9	23	32	50	—	—	—	—	—
Elitserien totals			522	113	111	224	381	42	6	8	14	26
HockeyAllsvenskan totals			115	44	59	103	96	27	7	6	13	12
