= Libor Procházka =

Czech ice hockey player (born 1974)

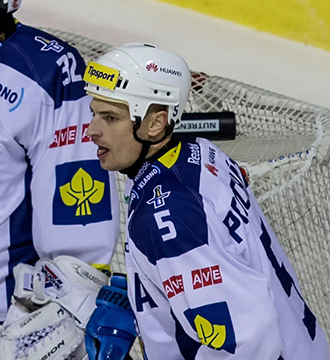
- Born: April 25, 1974 (age 52) Vlašim, Czechoslovakia
- Height: 6 ft 1 in (185 cm)
- Weight: 187 lb (85 kg; 13 st 5 lb)
- Position: Defence
- Shot: Right
- Played for: AIK IF; HC Oceláři Třinec; Worcester IceCats; HC Karlovy Vary; HC Sparta Prague; HC Plzeň 1929; Skellefteå AIK; Leksands IF; HC Berounští Medvědi; HC Kladno
- National team: Czech Republic
- NHL draft: 245th overall, 1993; St. Louis Blues
- Playing career: 1992–2014

Olympic medal record

Men's Ice hockey
Gold medal – first place	1998 Nagano	Ice hockey

Libor Procházka (Czech pronunciation: [ˈlɪbor ˈproxaːska], born April 25, 1974, in Vlašim, Czechoslovakia) is a former Czech ice hockey player. He was drafted 245th overall by the St. Louis Blues in the 1993 NHL entry draft.

He won a gold medal with the Czech Republic at the 1998 Winter Olympics in Nagano.

== Career statistics ==
=== Regular season and playoffs ===
			Regular season					Playoffs
Season	Team	League	GP	G	A	Pts	PIM	GP	G	A	Pts	PIM
1991–92	Poldi SONP Kladno	TCH	4	0	0	0	0	4	0	0	0	0
1992–93	Poldi SONP Kladno	TCH	25	1	2	3	12	—	—	—	—	—
1993–94	Poldi SONP Kladno	ELH	42	4	7	11	14	7	0	3	3	2
1994–95	Poldi SONP Kladno	ELH	40	4	16	20	81	11	2	0	2	14
1995–96	HC Poldi Kladno	ELH	38	6	11	17	77	8	2	1	3	4
1996–97	HC Poldi Kladno	ELH	49	4	15	19	108	3	0	0	0	4
1997–98	AIK	SEL	43	3	4	7	92	—	—	—	—	—
1998–99	HC Železárny Třinec	ELH	51	9	28	37	108	7	0	5	5	38
1999–2000	Worcester IceCats	AHL	36	2	6	8	32	3	0	0	0	2
2000–01	HC Becherovka Karlovy Vary	ELH	51	3	14	17	99	—	—	—	—	—
2001–02	HC Oceláři Třinec	ELH	52	7	10	17	80	6	0	2	2	10
2002–03	HC Oceláři Třinec	ELH	43	6	22	28	42	11	0	1	1	12
2003–04	HC Sparta Praha	ELH	31	2	7	9	40	13	2	5	7	20
2004–05	HC Sparta Praha	ELH	31	2	3	5	16	—	—	—	—	—
2004–05	HC Lasselsberger Plzeň	ELH	15	1	3	4	14	—	—	—	—	—
2005–06	HC Rabat Kladno	ELH	43	4	11	15	76	—	—	—	—	—
2005–06	Skellefteå AIK	SWE II	8	1	4	5	14	10	2	2	4	14
2006–07	HC Rabat Kladno	ELH	13	2	0	2	32	—	—	—	—	—
2006–07	Skellefteå AIK	SEL	43	0	4	4	73	—	—	—	—	—
2007–08	HC GEUS OKNA Kladno	ELH	8	0	1	1	12	—	—	—	—	—
2007–08	Leksands IF	SWE II	35	1	7	8	57	10	0	0	0	12
2008–09	HC Sparta Praha	ELH	43	1	5	6	71	4	0	1	1	10
2009–10	HC GEUS OKNA Kladno	ELH	5	0	1	1	6	—	—	—	—	—
2009–10	HC Berounští Medvědi	CZE II	3	0	1	1	4	—	—	—	—	—
2010–11	HC Vagnerplast Kladno	ELH	52	1	9	10	72	—	—	—	—	—
2011–12	Rytíři Kladno	ELH	42	1	5	6	61	3	0	0	0	2
2012–13	Rytíři Kladno	ELH	31	0	1	1	26	10	0	0	0	8
2012–13	IHC KOMTERM Písek	CZE II	4	1	1	2	6	—	—	—	—	—
2013–14	Rytíři Kladno	ELH	39	1	3	4	40	—	—	—	—	—
ELH totals			719	58	172	230	1075	104	7	18	25	146
SEL totals			86	3	8	11	165	15	0	0	0	22

=== International ===
Year	Team	Event	GP	G	A	Pts	PIM
1992	Czechoslovakia	EJC	1	0	0	0	0
1994	Czech Republic	WJC	5	0	0	0	2
1997	Czech Republic	WC	9	0	3	3	22
1998	Czech Republic	Oly	1	0	0	0	0
1998	Czech Republic	WC	8	0	2	2	12
1999	Czech Republic	WC	10	4	2	6	18
Senior totals			28	4	7	11	52
