= Oleg Petrov =

Russian ice hockey player (born 1971)

- Born: April 18, 1971 (age 55) Moscow, Russian SFSR, Soviet Union
- Height: 5 ft 9 in (175 cm)
- Weight: 172 lb (78 kg; 12 st 4 lb)
- Position: Right wing
- Shot: Left
- Played for: HC CSKA Moscow; Montreal Canadiens; HC Merano; HC Ambrì-Piotta; Nashville Predators; Genève-Servette HC; EV Zug; Ak Bars Kazan; Atlant Moscow Oblast; HC Spartak Moscow; Lokomotiv Yaroslavl
- National team: Russia
- NHL draft: 127th overall, 1991; Montreal Canadiens
- Playing career: 1989–2013

Oleg Viktorovich Petrov (Олег Викторович Петров; born April 18, 1971) is a Russian former ice hockey right winger. He played in the National Hockey League (NHL) between 1992 and 2003.

== Professional career ==
Petrov was drafted 127th overall by the Montreal Canadiens in the 1991 NHL entry draft and became the first Russian to play for the team. He played in 382 career NHL games, scoring 72 goals and 115 assists for 187 points. The most goals he ever scored in a single season in the NHL was 24 and the most points he ever achieved was 47. He won a Stanley Cup in 1993 with the Montreal Canadiens; however, he did not play enough games to officially qualify, so his name was not put on the Stanley Cup.

He left the NHL to end his career in Switzerland and signed up with EV Zug in Switzerland's Nationalliga A. He was the team's leading scorer in 2004–05 with 30 goals and 23 assists.

In November 2007, Ak Bars Kazan, which had problems with their roster after losing their second line in the off-season, signed Oleg Petrov, along with Jukka Hentunnen and Petr Ċajanek, to form a new second line. In a 2007 interview with a Russian sport website, Oleg Petrov said that he would consider quitting professional hockey after the season. In the summer of 2009, Oleg Petrov concluded a one-year contract with KHL team Atlant Mytishchi.

In August 2012, Petrov signed a 1-year contract with Spartak Moscow. Later that season, he was traded to HC Lokomotiv (Yaroslavl). He also announced that 2012-2013 would be the last season in his career.

He currently tours across Canada as part of the Montreal Canadiens alumni.

== Career statistics ==
=== Regular season and playoffs ===
			Regular season					Playoffs
Season	Team	League	GP	G	A	Pts	PIM	GP	G	A	Pts	PIM
1988–89	SKA MVO Kalinin	URS.2	7	0	0	0	0	—	—	—	—	—
1988–89	MCOP Moscow	URS.3	2	1	0	1	0	—	—	—	—	—
1989–90	CSKA Moscow	Soviet	30	4	7	11	4	—	—	—	—	—
1990–91	CSKA Moscow	Soviet	43	7	4	11	8	—	—	—	—	—
1991–92	CSKA Moscow	CIS	34	8	13	21	6	8	2	3	5	2
1991–92	CSKA–2 Moscow	CIS.3	3	0	0	0	4	—	—	—	—	—
1992–93	Montreal Canadiens	NHL	9	2	1	3	10	1	0	0	0	0
1992–93	Fredericton Canadiens	AHL	55	26	29	55	36	5	4	1	5	0
1993–94	Montreal Canadiens	NHL	55	12	15	27	2	2	0	0	0	0
1993–94	Fredericton Canadiens	AHL	23	8	20	28	18	—	—	—	—	—
1994–95	Montreal Canadiens	NHL	12	2	3	5	4	—	—	—	—	—
1994–95	Fredericton Canadiens	AHL	17	7	11	18	12	17	5	6	11	10
1995–96	Montreal Canadiens	NHL	36	4	7	11	23	5	0	1	1	0
1995–96	Fredericton Canadiens	AHL	22	12	18	30	71	6	2	6	8	0
1996–97	HC Merano	ITA	12	5	12	17	4	2	2	1	3	2
1996–97	HC Ambrì–Piotta	NDA	45	24	28	52	44	—	—	—	—	—
1997–98	HC Ambrì–Piotta	NDA	40	30	63	93	60	14	11	11	22	40
1998–99	HC Ambrì–Piotta	NDA	45	35	52	87	52	15	9	11	20	32
1999–2000	Montreal Canadiens	NHL	44	2	24	26	8	—	—	—	—	—
1999–2000	Québec Citadelles	AHL	16	7	7	14	4	—	—	—	—	—
2000–01	Montreal Canadiens	NHL	81	17	30	47	24	—	—	—	—	—
2001–02	Montreal Canadiens	NHL	75	24	17	41	12	12	1	5	6	2
2002–03	Montreal Canadiens	NHL	53	7	16	23	16	—	—	—	—	—
2002–03	Nashville Predators	NHL	17	2	2	4	2	—	—	—	—	—
2003–04	Genève–Servette HC	NLA	48	24	32	56	97	12	3	7	10	18
2004–05	EV Zug	NLA	44	29	23	52	85	8	1	5	6	45
2005–06	EV Zug	NLA	32	11	21	32	58	7	3	3	6	42
2006–07	EV Zug	NLA	42	12	40	52	95	12	4	6	10	18
2007–08	EV Zug	NLA	18	6	8	14	8	—	—	—	—	—
2007–08	Ak Bars Kazan	RSL	32	8	13	21	22	10	5	4	9	10
2008–09	Ak Bars Kazan	KHL	54	9	13	22	24	21	5	3	8	20
2009–10	Atlant Moscow Oblast	KHL	50	18	9	27	58	4	1	0	1	6
2010–11	Atlant Moscow Oblast	KHL	34	8	21	29	50	24	7	5	12	27
2011–12	Ak Bars Kazan	KHL	31	4	6	10	16	10	0	0	0	20
2012–13	Spartak Moscow	KHL	40	3	12	15	26	—	—	—	—	—
2012–13	Lokomotiv Yaroslavl	KHL	5	0	0	0	4	4	0	0	0	2
NHL totals			382	72	115	187	101	20	1	6	7	2
NDA/NLA totals			314	171	267	438	499	68	31	43	74	195
KHL totals			214	42	61	103	178	63	13	8	21	75

=== International ===
Year	Team	Event	Place	GP	G	A	Pts	PIM
1989	Soviet Union	EJC	1st place, gold medalist(s)	6	1	4	5	4
1991	Soviet Union	WJC	2nd place, silver medalist(s)	7	4	4	8	4
1998	Russia	WC	5th	6	3	3	6	4
1999	Russia	WC	5th	6	0	2	2	4
2000	Russia	WC	11th	6	1	1	2	4
Junior totals				13	5	8	13	8
Senior totals				18	4	6	10	12
