= Marko Tuomainen =

Finnish ice hockey player

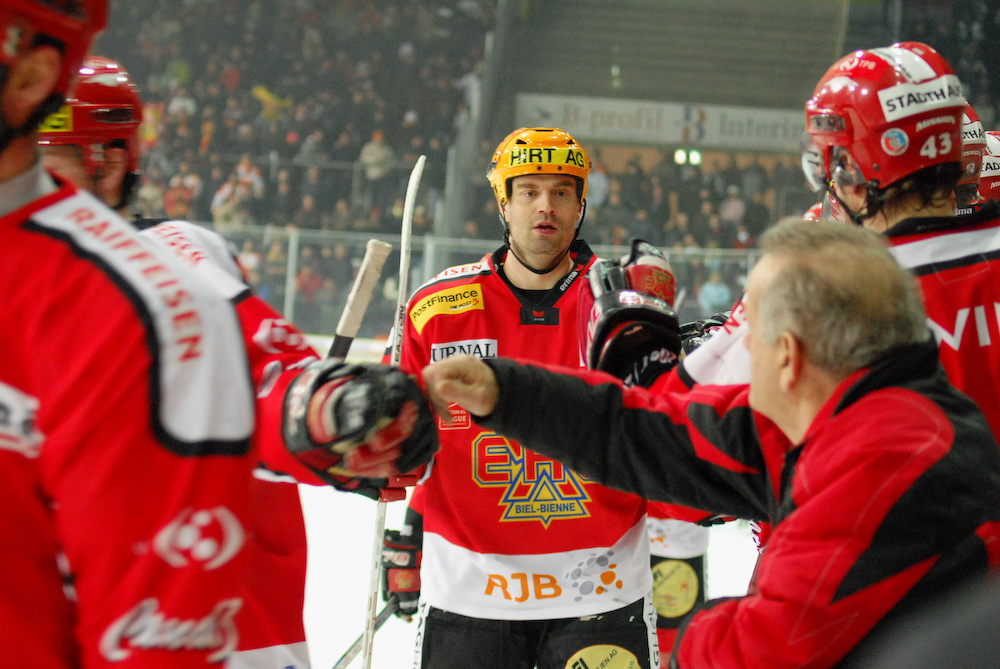
- Born: April 25, 1972 (age 52); Kuopio, Finland
- Height: 6 ft 3 in (191 cm)
- Weight: 218 lb (99 kg; 15 st 8 lb)
- Position: Left wing
- Shot: Right
- Played for: KalPa; Edmonton Oilers; HIFK; Los Angeles Kings; New York Islanders; Espoo Blues; Lausanne; Langnau; EHC Biel; HC Pustertal Wölfe
- National team: Finland
- NHL draft: 205th overall, 1992; Edmonton Oilers
- Playing career: 1990–2012

Marko J. Tuomainen (born April 25, 1972) is a Finnish former professional ice hockey player who played in the National Hockey League and SM-liiga. He played for KalPa, HIFK, Espoo Blues, Edmonton Oilers, Los Angeles Kings, and New York Islanders.

He last played in the Mestis with Kiekko-Vantaa during the 2011–12 season.

== Career statistics ==
=== Regular season and playoffs ===
			Regular season					Playoffs
Season	Team	League	GP	G	A	Pts	PIM	GP	G	A	Pts	PIM
1988–89	KalPa	Jr. A	7	6	6	12	4	—	—	—	—	—
1989–90	KalPa	Jr. A	36	13	24	37	30	—	—	—	—	—
1989–90	KalPa	SM-l	5	0	0	0	0	—	—	—	—	—
1990–91	KalPa	Jr. A	35	36	17	53	61	—	—	—	—	—
1990–91	KalPa	SM-l	30	2	1	3	2	8	0	0	0	6
1991–92	Clarkson University	ECAC	29	11	13	24	34	—	—	—	—	—
1992–93	Clarkson University	ECAC	35	25	30	55	26	—	—	—	—	—
1993–94	Clarkson University	ECAC	34	23	28	51	60	—	—	—	—	—
1994–95	Clarkson University	ECAC	37	23	37	60	34	—	—	—	—	—
1994–95	Edmonton Oilers	NHL	4	0	0	0	0	—	—	—	—	—
1995–96	Cape Breton Oilers	AHL	58	25	35	60	71	—	—	—	—	—
1996–97	Hamilton Bulldogs	AHL	79	31	21	52	130	22	7	5	12	4
1997–98	HIFK	SM-l	46	13	9	22	87	9	0	3	3	0
1998–99	HIFK	SM-l	48	11	17	28	173	11	1	3	4	12
1999–00	Los Angeles Kings	NHL	63	9	8	17	80	1	0	0	0	0
2000–01	Los Angeles Kings	NHL	11	0	1	1	4	—	—	—	—	—
2000–01	Lowell Lock Monsters	AHL	59	28	39	67	73	4	3	3	6	10
2001–02	Bridgeport Sound Tigers	AHL	76	11	34	45	82	20	1	2	3	6
2001–02	New York Islanders	NHL	1	0	0	0	0	—	—	—	—	—
2002–03	Espoo Blues	SM-l	46	10	11	21	70	7	0	1	1	4
2003–04	Espoo Blues	SM-l	56	8	13	21	68	9	1	3	4	4
2004–05	Lausanne HC	NLA	44	21	15	36	32	—	—	—	—	—
2005–06	SCL Tigers	NLA	44	14	22	36	18	—	—	—	—	—
2005–06	EHC Biel	NLB	—	—	—	—	—	11	7	7	14	10
2006–07	SCL Tigers	NLA	44	16	23	39	28	—	—	—	—	—
2007–08	EHC Biel	NLB	48	39	55	94	30	19	7	10	17	12
2008–09	EHC Biel	NLA	4	0	1	1	4	—	—	—	—	—
2008–09	SC Langenthal	NLB	35	12	30	42	28	1	0	0	0	4
2009–10	HC Pustertal Wölfe	ITL	34	6	10	16	14	7	6	7	13	6
2010–11	KooKoo	Mestis	16	5	3	8	28	—	—	—	—	—
2011–12	Kiekko-Vantaa	Mestis	11	5	5	10	14	4	0	4	4	10
Liiga totals			231	44	51	95	400	44	2	10	12	26
NHL totals			79	9	9	18	84	1	0	0	0	0

Medal record

Representing Finland

Ice hockey

World Championships
Silver medal – second place	1998 Switzerland	
Silver medal – second place	1999 Norway	
Bronze medal – third place	2000 Russia	

=== International ===
Year	Team	Event	Result	GP	G	A	Pts	PIM
1992	Finland	WJC	4th	7	1	4	5	14
1998	Finland	WC	2nd place, silver medalist(s)	8	0	1	1	8
1999	Finland	WC	2nd place, silver medalist(s)	12	4	2	6	28
2000	Finland	WC	3rd place, bronze medalist(s)	9	2	3	5	6
Junior totals				7	1	4	5	14
Senior totals				29	6	6	12	42

== Awards and honours ==
Award	Year
College
All-ECAC Hockey Rookie Team	1991–92
ECAC Hockey All-Tournament Team	1992
All-ECAC Hockey First Team	1992–93
All-ECAC Hockey First Team	1994–95
AHCA East Second-Team All-American	1994–95
AHL
All-Star Game	1997, 2001
