= Jere Karalahti =

Finnish ice hockey player (born 1975)

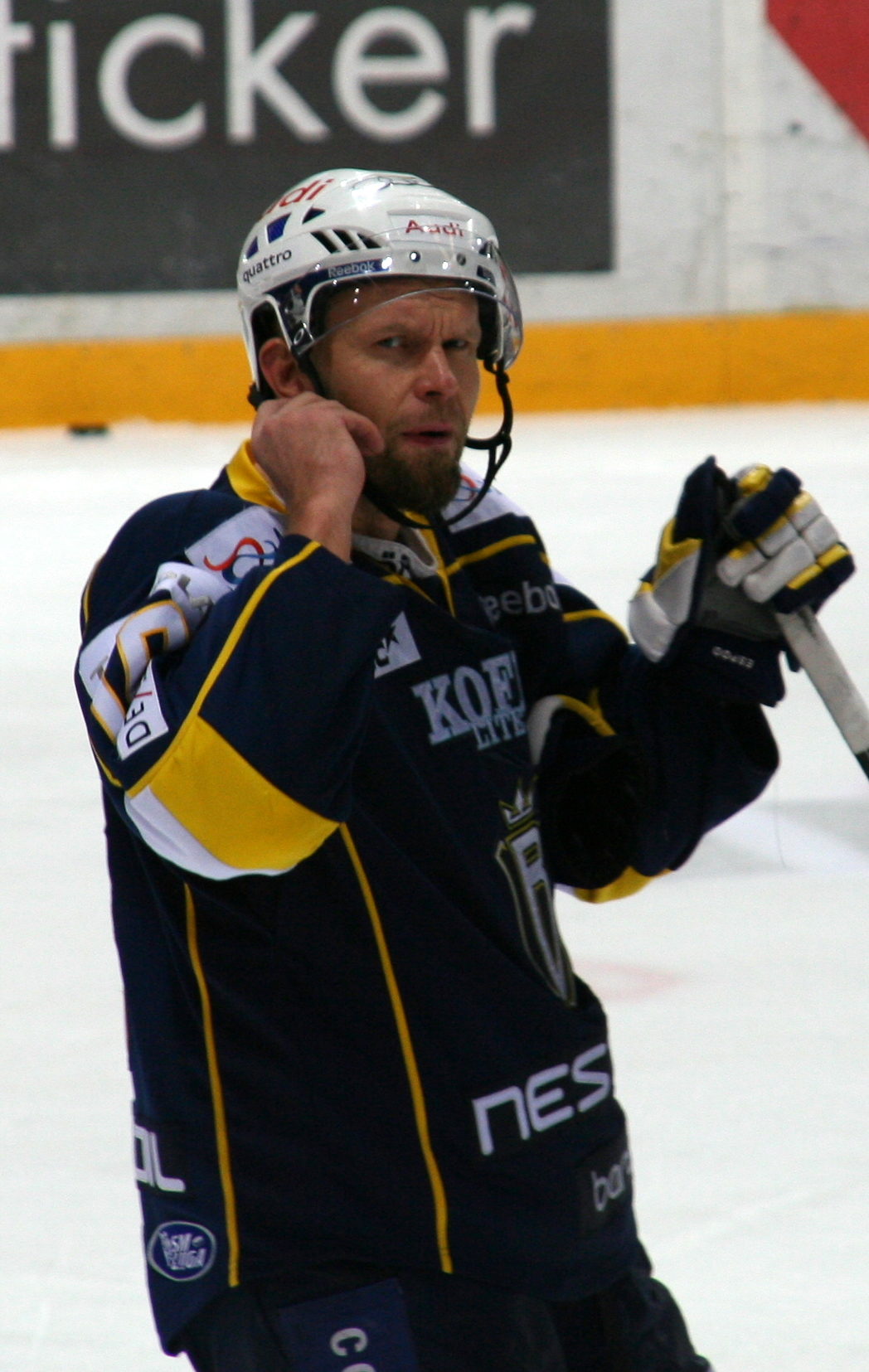
- Born: 25 March 1975 (age 51) Helsinki, Finland
- Height: 6 ft 2 in (188 cm)
- Weight: 209 lb (95 kg; 14 st 13 lb)
- Position: Defence
- Shot: Right
- Played for: HIFK; Los Angeles Kings; Nashville Predators; Oulun Kärpät; Hamburg Freezers; Blues; HC Dinamo Minsk; Jokerit; HV71
- National team: Finland
- NHL draft: 146th overall, 1993; Los Angeles Kings
- Playing career: 1993–2016

Jere Juhani Karalahti (born 25 March 1975) is a Finnish former professional ice hockey defenceman. He was drafted by the Los Angeles Kings as their sixth-round pick in the 1993 NHL entry draft and played a total of 166 games in the NHL. Karalahti won the 1998 Liiga championship in his native Finland. He is a three-time silver medalist at World Championships and also won one bronze with the Finnish national team. His playing career included stints in Finland, the US, Germany, Belarus and Sweden.

== Ice hockey career ==
=== Early career in Finland ===
In his younger years, Karalahti played in the 1989 Quebec International Pee-Wee Hockey Tournament with youth ice hockey team from Helsinki.

Karalahti played his first major ice hockey games for HIFK during the 1993–94 SM-liiga season. Karalahti was soon seen as a good physical defenceman and he began to have more ice time season by season. Karalahti's best SM-liiga moment came in 1998 when HIFK won the SM-liiga Championship over Ilves. Karalahti played a good season, posting a career high in points (30 points scored). Karalahti improved his record by three points in the following season and was subsequently offered a contract by the Los Angeles Kings of the National Hockey League.

=== NHL ===
Karalahti moved to North America in 1999 after difficulties with his visa, playing the rest of the season for the Los Angeles Kings. After a good first season, Karalahti's time on the ice was reduced and he eventually requested a trade to the Nashville Predators, On March 16, 2002, Karalahti and a fourth round pick were sent to the Nashville Predators in exchange for forward Cliff Ronning. In the summer of 2002 Karalahti was suspended for six months by the NHL for a drug violation, and he returned to Finland.

=== Return to Finland ===
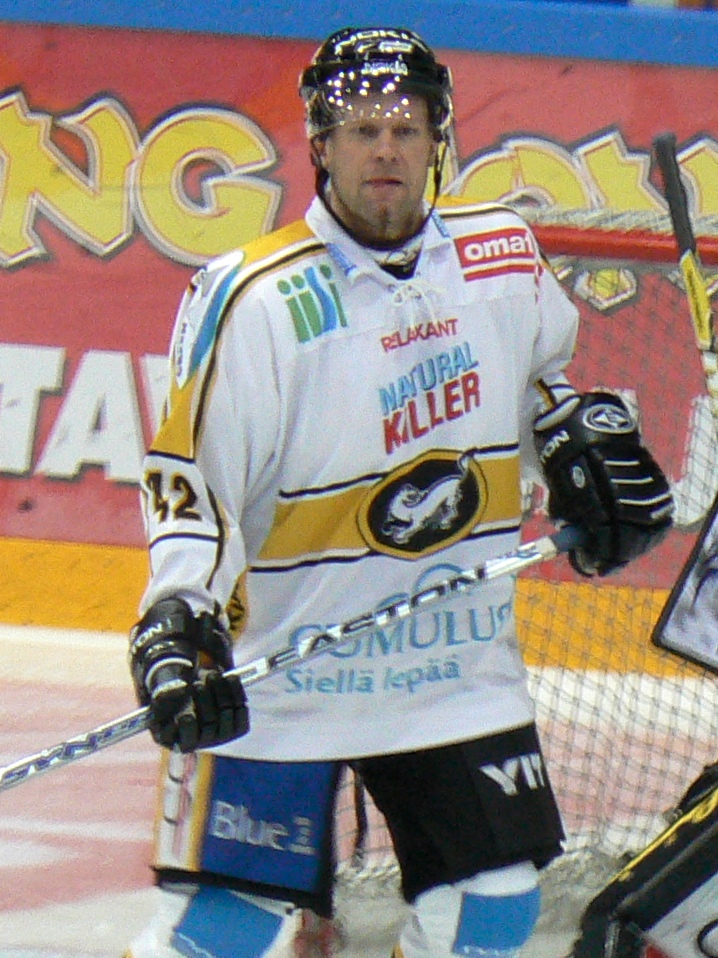
Jere Karalahti playing in Kärpät (2007)

Upon returning to the SM-liiga, Karalahti resumed his role as one of HIFK's premier defensemen. Head coach Doug Shedden made Karalahti team captain for the 2005–06 season, but he lost most of the season due to injuries. At the close of the season, Karalahti stirred up controversy by refusing to play in the bronze medal game for the second time in his HIFK career, citing a lack of interest. He was subsequently stripped of his captaincy. Karalahti's contract was not renewed by HIFK and he left the club he had been representing his entire career in Finland.

Karalahti was approached by several European teams including Jokerit and Kölner Haie but he chose Oulun Kärpät, a Northern Finland team which had rapidly risen to the Finnish Ice Hockey Elite. During his debut season Karalahti returned to his own level as the leading defenceman of Kärpät. Karalahti was released from Kärpät after he was arrested by Finnish police and taken into custody.

=== Later career ===
After being a free agent for some time Karalahti was approached by HC Slovan Bratislava, a top Slovak side which is the current Slovak League champion. Karalahti's move to Bratislava came to jeopardy when the transfer fell through because of a missing signature in the transfer documents. Juuso Pulliainen, Karalahti's agent, assured that both the Slovak Ice Hockey Administration and Finnish Ice Hockey Administration had agreed that Karalahti's rights are owned by Slovan, hence meaning he could play for Slovan. However, Karalahti stated that he wanted to clear things in Finland before rushing into anything.

On 24 July 2008 Jere Karalahti signed a contract with the Germany Elite League Club Hamburg Freezers in Germany for the 2008–09 season.

In May 2009, Karalahti announced that he would leave Hamburg to play for HC Neftekhimik Nizhnekamsk in the Russian Kontinental Hockey League. However, only a few weeks later he changed his mind and decided to re-sign with the Freezers instead.

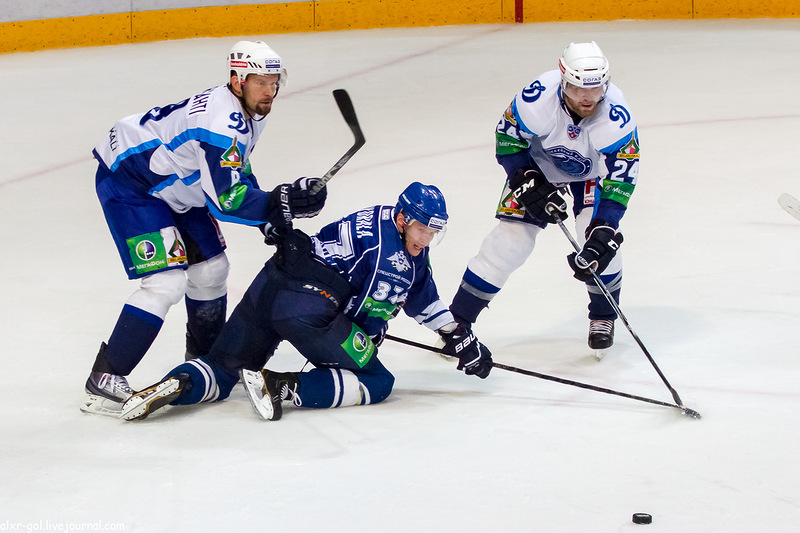
Jere Karalahti (left) during KHL game in September 2012

For the 2011–12 and 2012–13 seasons, Karalahti joined Dinamo Minsk in the Kontinental Hockey League (KHL), where he also became captain. In 2013, he returned to Helsinki to play for Jokerit in the Liiga and the KHL.

In November 2014 Karalahti signed a contract with HV71 in the Swedish Hockey League for the 2014–15 and the 2015–16 seasons. He announced his retirement in August 2016.

== Boxing career ==
Jere Karalahti was scheduled to have one boxing match against Matias Niemi on September 27, 2025, at the Helsingin Jäähalli as part of the F2F Event. This event featured Karalahti's debut in the sport of boxing.

== Substance abuse and charges ==
In a 21 January 2002 interview with Sports Illustrated, Karalahti detailed his history of drug use, which included an arrest in 1996 for possession of various quantities of marijuana, amphetamines and heroin, subsequently resulting in a brief suspension by the SM-liiga. He told the magazine that he had been drug-free for five years. Nevertheless, on August 16 of that year, the NHL suspended him for six months for his third violation of the league's substance abuse policy; however, this time the violation involved alcohol, not drugs. Following the suspension, Karalahti returned to Finland.

His NHL suspension resulted in him being unable to compete in the 2004 World Cup of Hockey.

For the 2007–08 season, Karalahti signed a contract with Oulun Kärpät, the then SM-liiga champion. This was his first time playing for any other Finnish team than his 'home team', Helsinki IFK. It was speculated that he would attempt a comeback in the NHL, and with this in mind had set a very strict contract with Kärpät that allowed no drug abuse and included regular check-ups with the team doctor.

On 6 November 2007, Finnish police came to an Oulun Kärpät practice session and took Jere Karalahti away for questioning. He was later transferred to Espoo where he was heard about his further involvement in a drug ring. The Espoo district court arrested him for suspicion of a gross drug felony.

On 12 December 2007, he was released from his contract with Kärpät.

On 29 January 2008, he was charged with smuggling 9 lbs (4.09 kg) of amphetamines into Finland. According to the prosecutor, he also allegedly provided €20,000 (US$29,000) for smuggling operations. He has denied all charges. The drug ring is suspected of smuggling about 20 kilograms of amphetamines and hundreds of grams of cocaine from Estonia to Finland last year. The charges carried a maximum penalty of up to six years in prison. Karalahti was convicted and given a 20-month suspended sentence. Both Karalahti and the prosecution say they will appeal.

On 20 March 2008, in Espoo District Court, Jere Karalahti was put on probation for 20 months and also fined €10,000.

Karalahti was remanded in custody on October 2, 2025, on suspicion of an aggravated narcotics offense that took place in Helsinki between June 1 and September 29, 2025. During the pre-trial investigation, police found about ten grams of amphetamine in Karalahti’s freezer, and Karalahti is alleged to have acquired hundreds of grams of cocaine and one kilogram of amphetamine, as well as distributed drugs. Karalahti appealed his detention, but the Court of Appeal rejected the appeal in early 2026. The criminal case involves 19 suspects, 14 of whom are suspected of aggravated drug offenses.

On 29 January 2026, Karalahti appeared at the Helsinki District Court, where prosecutors presented charges against him in connection with a wider narcotics case. According to Helsingin Sanomat, the prosecutor alleged Karalahti was connected to a network that imported and distributed more than 60 kilograms of amphetamine and several kilograms of cocaine in Finland during May–September 2025, and alleged that Karalahti received one kilogram of amphetamine and about 300 grams of cocaine to distribute onward; the report also stated that approximately 13 grams of amphetamine and less than one gram of cocaine were found in his freezer. The same report said Karalahti admitted involvement with narcotics but denied belonging to a criminal organisation or distributing drugs, and that his defence stated the drugs were acquired for personal use; Helsingin Sanomat reported that Karalahti admitted acquiring 80 grams of cocaine and 300 grams of amphetamine.

== Awards ==
- (gold) SM-liiga, Kanada-malja (1): 1997–98
- (silver) SM-liiga (2): 1998–99, 2010–11
- (bronze) SM-liiga (1): 2003-04

== Career statistics ==
=== Regular season and playoffs ===
			Regular season					Playoffs
Season	Team	League	GP	G	A	Pts	PIM	GP	G	A	Pts	PIM
1993–94	HIFK	SM-l	46	1	10	11	36	3	0	0	0	6
1994–95	HIFK	SM-l	37	1	7	8	42	3	0	0	0	0
1995–96	HIFK	SM-l	36	4	6	10	102	3	0	0	0	4
1996–97	HIFK	SM-l	18	3	5	8	20	—	—	—	—	—
1997–98	HIFK	SM-l	43	14	16	30	59	9	2	0	2	8
1998–99	HIFK	SM-l	49	11	22	33	65	11	1	1	2	10
1999–00	HIFK	SM-l	13	2	2	4	55	—	—	—	—	—
1999–00	Long Beach Ice Dogs	IHL	10	0	3	3	4	—	—	—	—	—
1999–00	Los Angeles Kings	NHL	48	6	10	16	18	4	0	1	1	2
2000–01	Los Angeles Kings	NHL	56	2	7	9	38	13	0	0	0	18
2001–02	Los Angeles Kings	NHL	30	0	1	1	29	—	—	—	—	—
2001–02	Nashville Predators	NHL	15	0	1	1	12	—	—	—	—	—
2003–04	HIFK	SM-l	45	7	16	23	148	12	3	4	7	2
2004–05	HIFK	SM-l	42	4	10	14	93	5	0	0	0	6
2005–06	HIFK	SM-l	20	4	11	15	43	11	1	2	3	2
2006–07	HIFK	SM-l	51	5	9	14	132	2	0	1	1	27
2007–08	Kärpät	SM-l	15	2	4	6	43	—	—	—	—	—
2008–09	Hamburg Freezers	DEL	50	7	16	23	148	9	2	2	4	10
2009–10	Hamburg Freezers	DEL	47	5	14	19	193	—	—	—	—	—
2010–11	Blues	SM-l	53	11	19	30	147	18	0	5	5	36
2011–12	Dinamo Minsk	KHL	54	7	7	14	90	4	0	2	2	6
2012–13	Dinamo Minsk	KHL	45	1	9	10	96	—	—	—	—	—
2013–14	Jokerit	Liiga	56	8	27	35	76	2	0	0	0	14
2014–15	Jokerit	KHL	22	1	8	9	40	—	—	—	—	—
2014–15	HV71	SHL	30	6	13	19	57	6	1	2	3	2
2015–16	HV71	SHL	36	3	9	12	72	6	0	0	0	6
Liiga totals			524	77	164	241	1061	79	7	13	20	115
NHL totals			149	8	19	27	97	17	0	1	1	20
KHL totals			121	9	24	33	226	4	0	2	2	6

Medal record

Representing Finland

Ice hockey

World Championships
Silver medal – second place	1998 Switzerland	
Silver medal – second place	1999 Norway	
Silver medal – second place	2014 Belarus	
Bronze medal – third place	2000 Russia	

=== International ===
Year	Team	Event	GP	G	A	Pts	PIM
1993	Finland	EJC18	6	2	2	4	8
1994	Finland	WJC	7	3	2	5	4
1995	Finland	WJC	7	2	4	6	8
1998	Finland	WC	10	4	3	7	6
1999	Finland	WC	12	5	3	8	2
2000	Finland	WC	9	1	1	2	8
2002	Finland	WC	9	2	3	5	10
2004	Finland	WC	7	0	0	0	4
2005	Finland	WC	7	1	3	4	6
2014	Finland	WC	10	1	3	4	10
Junior totals			20	7	8	15	20
Senior totals			64	14	16	30	46
