= Pavel Patera =

Czech ice hockey player

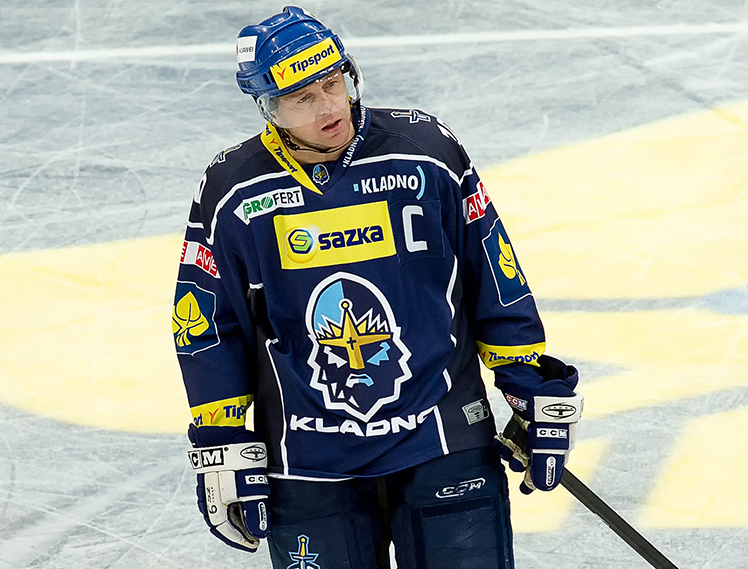
- Born: September 6, 1971 (age 54) Kladno, Czechoslovakia
- Height: 6 ft 1 in (185 cm)
- Weight: 187 lb (85 kg; 13 st 5 lb)
- Position: Centre
- Shot: Left
- Played for: HC Olomouc; Rytíři Kladno; Färjestad BK; Avangard Omsk; Minnesota Wild; HC Slovnaft Vsetín; Dallas Stars; AIK
- National team: Czech Republic
- NHL draft: 153rd overall, 1998; Dallas Stars
- Playing career: 1990–2015

Pavel Patera (born September 6, 1971) is a Czech former professional ice hockey player. Patera was drafted by the Dallas Stars at 1998 NHL entry draft as the 153rd pick overall.

== Career ==
Patera has played in several countries. He started his career in his native country playing for HC Kladno in 1990. He stayed with Kladno until 1996 when he and his two linemates in Kladno and in the Czech national team, Martin Procházka and Otakar Vejvoda moved to Sweden to join the Elitserien team AIK for the 1996–1997 season. Procházka left AIK for Toronto Maple Leafs during the summer of 1997 and Vejvoda was forced to retire due to an injury early in the 1997/98 season. Patera left AIK in 1998 too, moved back home to the Czech Republic and signed with HC Vsetín.

After only one season with HC Vsetín Patera signed with the Dallas Stars. However, he played only 12 games with the Stars before he moved back to the Czech Republic and HC Vsetín. The following 2000/01 season he signed with NHL team Minnesota Wild, but after only playing 20 games with the Wild and spending the rest of the season in the IHL, Patera decided to return to Europe. He played with HC Kladno for a very short time (three games in the beginning of the 2001/02 season), before signing with Russian team Avangard Omsk, where he spend that season and the two following.

In the summer of 2004 he signed again with HC Kladno, but this time he stayed with the club. And with the exception of a three-month loan to Swedish Elitserien club Färjestads BK in the spring of 2006, he has stayed with Kladno (as of March 25, 2007).

== Achievements ==
- World Championship Gold Medal 1996, 1999, 2000, 2001
- World Championship Bronze Medal 1997, 1998
- Olympic Gold Medal 1998
- Czech Extraliga Champion 98/99
- Russian Super League Champion 03/04
- Elitserien Champion 05/06

== Career statistics ==
=== Regular season and playoffs ===
			Regular season					Playoffs
Season	Team	League	GP	G	A	Pts	PIM	GP	G	A	Pts	PIM
1990–91	Poldi SONP Kladno	CSSR	3	0	0	0	0	—	—	—	—	—
1991–92	Poldi SONP Kladno	CSSR	38	12	10	22	20	8	8	7	15	6
1992–93	Poldi SONP Kladno	CSSR	33	8	19	27	42	—	—	—	—	—
1993–94	Poldi SONP Kladno	CZE	43	21	39	60	22	11	5	10	15	8
1994–95	Poldi SONP Kladno	CZE	43	26	49	75	24	11	5	7	12	8
1995–96	HC Poldi Kladno	CZE	40	24	31	55	38	8	3	2	5	34
1996–97	AIK	SWE	50	19	24	43	44	7	2	3	5	6
1997–98	AIK	SWE	46	8	17	25	50	—	—	—	—	—
1998–99	HC Slovnaft Vsetín	CZE	51	15	38	53	58	12	5	10	15	2
1999–00	Dallas Stars	NHL	12	1	4	5	4	—	—	—	—	—
1999–00	HC Slovnaft Vsetín	CZE	29	8	14	22	48	9	3	4	7	8
2000–01	Minnesota Wild	NHL	20	1	3	4	4	—	—	—	—	—
2000–01	Cleveland Lumberjacks	IHL	54	8	44	52	22	—	—	—	—	—
2001–02	HC Vagnerplast Kladno	CZE	3	0	2	2	0	—	—	—	—	—
2001–02	Avangard Omsk	RSL	28	5	8	13	30	11	1	3	4	6
2002–03	Avangard Omsk	RSL	51	14	32	46	68	12	2	4	6	6
2003–04	Avangard Omsk	RSL	59	16	24	40	48	11	0	3	3	6
2004–05	HC Rabat Kladno	CZE	49	13	30	43	50	6	2	2	4	27
2005–06	HC Rabat Kladno	CZE	29	11	10	21	48	—	—	—	—	—
2005–06	Färjestad BK	SWE	8	0	0	0	4	18	2	0	2	16
2006–07	HC Rabat Kladno	CZE	52	18	39	57	89	3	0	0	0	4
2007–08	HC GEUS OKNA Kladno	CZE	52	19	22	41	68	9	5	2	7	4
2008–09	HC GEUS OKNA Kladno	CZE	51	17	28	45	34	—	—	—	—	—
2009–10	HC GEUS OKNA Kladno	CZE	47	13	24	37	103	—	—	—	—	—
2010–11	HC Vagnerplast Kladno	CZE	52	7	22	29	54	—	—	—	—	—
2011–12	Rytíři Kladno	CZE	52	10	17	27	26	3	1	3	4	4
2012–13	Rytíři Kladno	CZE	42	10	22	32	44	10	2	4	6	2
2013–14	Rytíři Kladno	CZE	40	5	21	26	20	—	—	—	—	—
2014–15	HC Olomouc	CZE	48	8	6	14	44	—	—	—	—	—
CZE totals			723	225	414	639	770	92	31	44	75	101
NHL totals			32	2	7	9	8	—	—	—	—	—

=== International ===
Year	Team	Event	GP	G	A	Pts	PIM
1995	Czech Republic	WC	7	0	0	0	2
1996	Czech Republic	WCH	2	0	1	1	0
1996	Czech Republic	WC	8	3	5	8	2
1997	Czech Republic	WC	9	3	8	11	4
1998	Czech Republic	OG	6	2	3	5	0
1998	Czech Republic	WC	9	6	3	9	12
1999	Czech Republic	WC	10	3	4	7	6
2000	Czech Republic	WC	9	1	1	2	4
2001	Czech Republic	WC	9	0	5	5	2
2002	Czech Republic	OG	2	0	0	0	2
2002	Czech Republic	WC	7	2	3	5	4
Senior totals			76	20	32	52	38
