= Jan Larsson =

Swedish ice hockey player

- Born: September 4, 1965 (age 59); Långshyttan, Sweden
- Height: 6 ft 0 in (183 cm)
- Weight: 190 lb (86 kg; 13 st 8 lb)
- Position: Centre
- Shot: Left
- Elitserien team Former teams: Brynäs IF; Modo Hockey; HC Lugano (NLA)
- National team: Sweden
- Playing career: 1983–2003

Jan Larsson (born September 4, 1965) is a retired Swedish professional ice hockey player who is currently an assistant coach for Brynäs IF. Larsson played 680 Elitserien games during his playing career, spending most of that time (16 seasons) with Brynäs.

== Awards and accolades ==
- 1999–2000 Håkan Loob Trophy
- 1998–99 Guldhjälmen
- Swedish national champion in 1993 and 1999 with Brynäs IF

== Career statistics ==
=== Regular season and playoffs ===
			Regular season					Playoffs
Season	Team	League	GP	G	A	Pts	PIM	GP	G	A	Pts	PIM
1983–84	Brynäs IF	SEL	3	0	0	0	0	—	—	—	—	—
1984–85	Brynäs IF	SEL	3	0	0	0	2	—	—	—	—	—
1985–86	Brynäs IF	SEL	34	3	3	6	8	3	0	0	0	2
1986–87	Brynäs IF	SEL	35	11	2	13	18	—	—	—	—	—
1987–88	Brynäs IF	SEL	40	12	10	22	12	—	—	—	—	—
1988–89	Brynäs IF	SEL	35	17	16	33	14	5	1	1	2	2
1989–90	Brynäs IF	SEL	40	14	24	38	30	5	5	5	10	2
1990–91	Brynäs IF	SEL	40	5	12	17	28	2	1	0	1	0
1991–92	Brynäs IF	SEL	40	17	32	49	26	5	1	3	4	0
1992–93	Brynäs IF	SEL	31	10	12	22	18	10	2	6	8	4
1993–94	HC Lugano	NDA	35	15	32	47	16	9	6	6	12	10
1994–95	HC Lugano	NDA	36	16	26	42	22	4	1	5	6	4
1995–96	Modo Hockey	SEL	39	9	19	28	16	7	1	3	4	4
1996–97	Modo Hockey	SEL	49	9	26	35	24	—	—	—	—	—
1997–98	Brynäs IF	SEL	46	18	25	43	28	2	1	0	1	0
1998–99	Brynäs IF	SEL	50	16	43	59	30	14	5	9	14	6
1999–2000	Brynäs IF	SEL	50	26	25	51	55	11	2	5	7	8
2000–01	Brynäs IF	SEL	50	17	29	46	16	4	1	4	5	4
2001–02	Brynäs IF	SEL	46	15	27	42	38	4	0	2	2	4
2002–03	Brynäs IF	SEL	49	6	17	23	63	—	—	—	—	—
SEL totals			680	205	322	527	426	72	20	38	58	36
NDA totals			71	31	58	89	38	13	7	11	18	14

=== International ===
Year	Team	Event	GP	G	A	Pts	PIM
1992	Sweden	WC	8	2	1	3	2
1993	Sweden	WC	8	1	1	2	14
1994	Sweden	WC	8	0	2	2	14
1996	Sweden	WC	6	1	1	2	0
1999	Sweden	WC	10	1	1	2	6
Senior totals			40	5	6	11	36
