= Juha Lind =

Finnish ice hockey player

- Born: 2 January 1974 (age 52) Helsinki, Finland
- Height: 5 ft 11 in (180 cm)
- Weight: 183 lb (83 kg; 13 st 1 lb)
- Position: Left wing
- Shot: Left
- Played for: Jokerit; Dallas Stars; Montreal Canadiens; Södertälje SK; Red Bull Salzburg EC; Leksands IF
- National team: Finland
- NHL draft: 178th overall, 1992; Minnesota North Stars
- Playing career: 1992–2010

Juha Petteri Lind (born 2 January 1974 in Helsinki, Finland) is a Finnish former professional ice hockey player.

Lind started his career with Jokerit his hometown team. He was drafted 178th overall by the Minnesota North Stars in the 1992 NHL entry draft. He remained with Jokerit until 1997 when he joined the Dallas Stars. He would spend two years in Dallas before being sent to the Montreal Canadiens in a trade for Scott Thornton. Lind moved to Södertälje SK in Sweden's Elitserien in 2001 and after three seasons, he returned to Jokerit in 2004. In 2005, Lind moved to Red Bull Salzburg EC in Austria and after two seasons, he returned to Sweden, signing with Leksands IF. For 2008–09, Lind returned to Jokerit for his third spell with the team.

Lind's father Arvi Lind was a retired television news presenter.

== Career statistics ==
=== Regular season and playoffs ===
			Regular season					Playoffs
Season	Team	League	GP	G	A	Pts	PIM	GP	G	A	Pts	PIM
1990–91	Jokerit	FIN U18	24	21	16	37	4	—	—	—	—	—
1990–91	Jokerit	FIN U20	8	1	1	2	0	—	—	—	—	—
1991–92	Jokerit	FIN.2 U20	14	9	16	25	2	14	7	8	15	8
1992–93	Jokerit	FIN.2 U20	3	2	4	6	2	12	11	26	37	4
1992–93	Jokerit	SM-l	6	0	0	0	2	1	0	0	0	0
1992–93	Vantaa HT	FIN.2	25	8	12	20	8	—	—	—	—	—
1993–94	Jokerit	FIN U20	11	6	7	13	4	—	—	—	—	—
1993–94	Jokerit	SM-l	47	17	11	28	37	11	2	5	7	4
1994–95	Jokerit	FIN U20	3	2	1	3	2	—	—	—	—	—
1994–95	Jokerit	SM-l	50	10	8	18	12	11	1	2	3	6
1995–96	Jokerit	SM-l	50	15	22	37	32	11	4	5	9	4
1996–97	Jokerit	SM-l	50	16	22	38	28	9	5	3	8	0
1997–98	Dallas Stars	NHL	39	2	3	5	6	15	2	2	4	8
1997–98	Michigan K-Wings	IHL	8	2	2	4	2	—	—	—	—	—
1998–99	Jokerit	SM-l	50	20	19	39	22	3	3	1	4	2
1999–2000	Dallas Stars	NHL	34	3	4	7	6	—	—	—	—	—
1999–2000	Montreal Canadiens	NHL	13	1	2	3	4	—	—	—	—	—
2000–01	Montreal Canadiens	NHL	47	3	4	7	4	—	—	—	—	—
2000–01	Quebec Citadelles	AHL	3	1	1	2	0	—	—	—	—	—
2001–02	Södertälje SK	SEL	41	16	10	26	10	—	—	—	—	—
2002–03	Södertälje SK	SEL	47	17	9	26	24	—	—	—	—	—
2003–04	Södertälje SK	SEL	49	13	11	24	28	—	—	—	—	—
2004–05	Jokerit	SM-l	56	15	19	34	24	12	2	3	5	2
2005–06	EC Red Bull Salzburg	AUT	45	14	26	40	12	11	3	4	7	10
2006–07	EC Red Bull Salzburg	AUT	53	17	31	48	48	8	5	6	11	4
2007–08	Leksands IF	SWE.2	44	16	32	48	12	10	1	5	6	4
2008–09	Jokerit	SM-l	55	12	10	22	28	5	0	0	0	0
2009–10	Jokerit	SM-l	58	5	9	14	16	3	0	1	1	0
SM-l totals			422	110	120	230	201	66	18	19	37	18
NHL totals			133	9	13	22	20	15	2	2	4	8
SEL totals			137	46	30	76	62	—	—	—	—	—

=== International ===
Year	Team	Event	GP	G	A	Pts	PIM
1992	Finland	EJC	6	2	7	9	4
1994	Finland	WJC	7	5	2	7	2
1997	Finland	WC	8	1	0	1	8
1998	Finland	OG	6	0	1	1	6
1999	Finland	WC	12	3	2	5	4
2000	Finland	WC	9	3	4	7	4
2001	Finland	WC	9	1	3	4	4
2002	Finland	OG	4	0	0	0	0
2002	Finland	WC	9	0	1	1	2
Junior totals			13	7	9	16	6
Senior totals			57	8	11	19	28
