= Oleg Shevtsov =

Russian ice hockey player

- Born: November 29, 1971 (age 53); Moscow, Soviet Union
- Height: 6 ft 2 in (188 cm)
- Weight: 213 lb (97 kg; 15 st 3 lb)
- Position: Goaltender
- Caught: Left
- Played for: Spartak Moscow; HC Severstal; Lokomotiv Yaroslavl; Avangard Omsk; Dynamo Moscow; Vityaz Podolsk; CSKA Moscow; Dynamo Minsk
- National team: Russia
- Playing career: 1989–2006

Olympic medal record

Men's Ice hockey
Silver medal – second place	1998 Nagano	Ice hockey

Oleg Borisovich Shevtsov (Russian: Олег Борисович Шевцов; born November 29, 1971) is a Russian ice hockey player. He won a silver medal at the 1998 Winter Olympics.
