= Jan Čaloun =

Czech ice hockey player (born 1972)

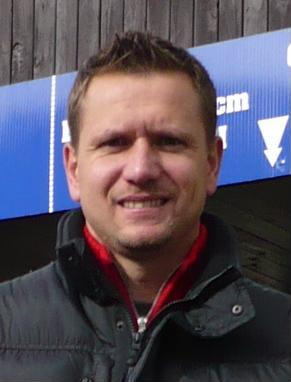
- Born: 20 December 1972 (age 53) Ústí nad Labem, Czechoslovakia
- Height: 5 ft 11 in (180 cm)
- Weight: 176 lb (80 kg; 12 st 8 lb)
- Position: Right wing
- Shot: Right
- Played for: HC Litvínov; San Jose Sharks; HIFK; Columbus Blue Jackets; Espoo Blues; Severstal Cherepovets; HC Sibir Novosibirsk; HC Pardubice; HC Slovan Ústečtí Lvi
- National team: Czechoslovakia and Czech Republic
- NHL draft: 75th overall, 1992; San Jose Sharks
- Playing career: 1989–2010
Medal record
Men's ice hockey
Representing Czech Republic
Olympic Games
Gold medal – first place	1998 Nagano	Team

Jan Čaloun (born 20 December 1972) is a Czech former professional hockey player. He is 180 cm (5 ft 11 in) tall, 80 kg (180 lb) in weight. He shoots right and plays right wing. He was drafted by the San Jose Sharks in the fourth round, 75th overall in the 1992 NHL entry draft. Čaloun experienced success at the minor pro level, playing for the Kansas City Blades and Kentucky Thoroughblades, but was unable to make the big jump to the NHL. However, he did manage to score goals on his first four shots while playing for the Sharks. In 1998 he was a member of the Czech Olympic Team, which won the gold medal in Nagano.

== Career statistics ==
=== Regular season and playoffs ===
			Regular season					Playoffs
Season	Team	League	GP	G	A	Pts	PIM	GP	G	A	Pts	PIM
1989–90	TJ CHZ Litvínov	CSSR U20	—	—	—	—	—	—	—	—	—	—
1990–91	HC CHZ Litvínov	CSSR	42	23	18	41	12	8	5	1	6	0
1991–92	HC Chemopetrol Litvínov	CSSR	37	32	7	39	24	9	7	6	13	—
1992–93	HC Chemopetrol Litvínov	CSSR	36	37	16	53	—	11	8	6	14	—
1993–94	HC Chemopetrol Litvínov	ELH	42	26	18	44	22	4	2	1	3	2
1994–95	Kansas City Blades	IHL	76	34	39	73	50	21	13	10	23	18
1995–96	San Jose Sharks	NHL	11	8	3	11	0	—	—	—	—	—
1995–96	Kansas City Blades	IHL	61	38	30	68	58	5	0	1	1	6
1996–97	San Jose Sharks	NHL	2	0	0	0	0	—	—	—	—	—
1996–97	Kentucky Thoroughblades	AHL	66	43	43	86	68	4	0	1	1	4
1997–98	HIFK	SM-l	41	22	26	48	73	9	6	11	17	6
1998–99	HIFK	SM-l	51	24	57	81	95	8	8	6	14	31
1999–00	HIFK	SM-l	44	38	34	72	94	9	3	6	9	10
2000–01	Columbus Blue Jackets	NHL	11	0	3	3	2	—	—	—	—	—
2000–01	HIFK	SM-l	24	8	14	22	42	—	—	—	—	—
2001–02	Blues	SM-l	48	15	43	58	49	3	1	1	2	25
2002–03	Blues	SM-l	46	22	33	55	6	7	5	4	9	4
2003–04	Blues	SM-l	44	16	23	39	34	—	—	—	—	—
2004–05	Severstal Cherepovets	RSL	5	0	0	0	0	—	—	—	—	—
2004–05	Sibir Novosibirsk	RSL	1	0	0	0	0	—	—	—	—	—
2004–05	HC Chemopetrol	ELH	24	26	13	39	47	6	1	2	3	16
2004–05	HC Slovan Ústečtí Lvi	CZE.2	2	1	3	4	2	—	—	—	—	—
2005–06	HC Moeller Pardubice	ELH	48	19	20	39	14	—	—	—	—	—
2006–07	HC Moeller Pardubice	ELH	48	20	12	32	60	16	7	4	11	2
2007–08	HC Slovan Ústečtí Lvi	ELH	23	6	7	13	16	—	—	—	—	—
2008–09	HC Litvínov	ELH	2	0	1	1	2	—	—	—	—	—
2008–09	HC Slovan Ústečtí Lvi	CZE.2	30	12	7	19	20	13	3	5	8	12
2009–10	HC Vrchlabí	CZE.2	30	13	14	27	20	—	—	—	—	—
ELH totals			196	97	73	170	161	26	10	7	17	20
SM-l totals			298	145	230	375	393	36	23	28	51	76
NHL totals			24	8	6	14	2	—	—	—	—	—

=== International ===
Year	Team	Event	GP	G	A	Pts	PIM
1990	Czechoslovakia	EJC	6	4	3	7	16
1992	Czechoslovakia	WJC	7	8	1	9	20
1993	Czech Republic	WC	8	0	2	2	8
1998	Czech Republic	OG	3	0	0	0	6
1999	Czech Republic	WC	6	4	2	6	4
Junior totals			13	12	4	16	36
Senior totals			17	4	4	8	18

Preceded by Raimo Helminen	Winner of the Lasse Oksanen trophy 1998–99	Succeeded by Kai Nurminen
Preceded by Peter Larsson	Winner of the Veli-Pekka Ketola trophy 1998–99	Succeeded by Kai Nurminen
