= 1998–99 Euro Hockey Tour =

1999–99 Euro Hockey Tour
Tournament details
- Dates: 3 September 1998 – 14 February 1999
- Teams: 4

Final positions
- Champions: Sweden (1st title)
- Runners-up: Finland
- Third place: Czech Republic
- Fourth place: Russia

Tournament statistics
- Games played: 24
- Goals scored: 115 (4.79 per game)
- Attendance: 153,946 (6,414 per game)

The 1998–99 Euro Hockey Tour was the third season of the Euro Hockey Tour. The season consisted of four tournaments, the Česká Pojišťovna Cup, Karjala Tournament, Baltica Brewery Cup, and the Sweden Hockey Games. The games Canada participated in did not count towards the final standings of the tournament.

== Standings ==
Team	Pld	W	D	L	GF	GA	GD	Pts
Sweden	12	6	4	2	32	21	+11	16
Finland	12	7	2	3	31	27	+4	16
Czech Republic	12	3	5	4	28	27	+1	11
Russia	12	1	3	8	24	40	−16	5

Source: hokej

== Česká Pojišťovna Cup ==
The tournament was played between 3–6 September 1998. All of the matches were played in Zlín, Czech Republic. The tournament was won by Sweden

Pos	Team	Pld	W	D	L	GF	GA	GD	Pts
1	Sweden	3	2	1	0	7	1	+6	7
2	Finland	3	2	0	1	5	5	0	6
3	Czech Republic	3	0	2	1	4	5	−1	2
4	Russia	3	0	1	2	3	8	−5	1

Source: swehockey

3 September 1998
Russia	0–3	Sweden
Czech Republic	1–2	Finland
4 September 1998
Sweden	4–1	Finland
5 September 1998
Russia	3–3	Czech Republic
6 September 1998
Finland	2–0	Russia
Czech Republic	0–0	Sweden

== Karjala Tournament ==
The tournament was played between 5–8 November 1998. All of the matches were played in Helsinki, Finland. The tournament was won by Finland.

Pos	Team	Pld	W	D	L	GF	GA	GD	Pts
1	Finland	3	2	1	0	10	7	+3	5
2	Russia	3	1	1	1	8	6	+2	3
3	Czech Republic	3	0	2	1	7	9	−2	2
4	Sweden	3	0	2	1	5	8	−3	2

Source: hokej

5 November 1998
Czech Republic	2–3	Sweden
Finland	3–2	Russia
7 November 1998
Russia	4–1	Sweden
Czech Republic	3–5	Finland
8 November 1998
Czech Republic	2–2	Russia
Finland	2–2	Sweden

== Baltica Brewery Cup ==
The tournament was played between 15 and 20 December 1998. All of the matches were played in Moscow, Russia. The tournament was won by Sweden.

Pos	Team	Pld	W	D	L	GF	GA	GD	Pts
1	Sweden	4	4	0	0	14	9	+5	12
2	Czech Republic	4	3	0	1	15	8	+7	9
3	Finland	4	1	1	2	9	10	−1	4
4	Russia	4	1	1	2	11	13	−2	4
5	Canada	4	0	0	4	9	18	−9	0

Source: swehockey

15 December 1998
Sweden	3–2	Finland
Russia	3–1	Canada
16 December 1998
Canada	3–4	Sweden
Czech Republic	3–0	Finland
17 December 1998
Russia	3–5	Czech Republic
18 December 1998
Finland	5–2	Canada
19 December 1998
Finland	2–2	Russia
Czech Republic	1–2	Sweden
20 December 1998
Sweden	5–3	Russia
Canada	3–6	Czech Republic

== Sweden Hockey Games ==
The tournament was played between 9–14 February 1999. All of the matches were played in Stockholm, Sweden. The tournament was won by Finland.

Pos	Team	Pld	W	D	L	GF	GA	GD	Pts
1	Finland	4	3	0	1	14	10	+4	9
2	Sweden	4	2	1	1	14	7	+7	7
3	Canada	4	2	0	2	6	9	−3	6
4	Czech Republic	4	1	1	2	8	9	−1	4
5	Russia	4	1	0	3	8	15	−7	3

Source: swehockey

9 February 1999
Russia	4–5	Czech Republic
Canada	1–4	Sweden
10 February 1999
Finland	3–2	Czech Republic
11 February 1999
Finland	2–3	Canada
Sweden	5–0	Russia
12 February 1999
Czech Republic	0–1	Canada
13 February 1999
Russia	1–4	Finland
Czech Republic	1–1	Sweden
14 February 1999
Canada	1–3	Russia
Sweden	4–5	Finland
