= Viktor Ujčík =

Czech ice hockey player

- Born: May 24, 1972 (age 53) Jihlava, Czechoslovakia
- Height: 5 ft 10 in (178 cm)
- Weight: 201 lb (91 kg; 14 st 5 lb)
- Position: Forward
- Shot: Left
- Czech Extraliga team: HC Vítkovice
- National team: Czech Republic
- NHL draft: 266th overall, 2001; Montreal Canadiens
- Playing career: 1991–2014

Viktor Ujčík (born May 24, 1972) was a former Czech professional ice hockey player. He was selected in the ninth round, 266th overall, by the Montreal Canadiens in the 2001 NHL entry draft.

Ujcik played with HC Vítkovice in the Czech Extraliga during the 2010–11 Czech Extraliga season.

== Career statistics ==
=== Regular season and playoffs ===
			Regular season					Playoffs
Season	Team	League	GP	G	A	Pts	PIM	GP	G	A	Pts	PIM
1990–91	ASD Dukla Jihlava	TCH	2	0	0	0	0	—	—	—	—	—
1991–92	ASD Dukla Jihlava	TCH	35	10	8	18		—	—	—	—	—
1992–93	ASD Dukla Jihlava	TCH	30	16	16	32		—	—	—	—	—
1993–94	ASD Dukla Jihlava	ELH	44	17	30	47	24	—	—	—	—	—
1994–95	HC Dukla Jihlava	ELH	42	20	16	36	65	—	—	—	—	—
1994–95	HC Železárny Třinec	CZE.2
1995–96	HC Slavia Praha	ELH	39	37	19	56	61	7	8	4	12	6
1996–97	HC Slavia Praha	ELH	40	26	21	47	41	3	1	1	2	4
1997–98	HC Slavia Praha	ELH	17	12	7	19	10	—	—	—	—	—
1997–98	HC Železárny Třinec	ELH	29	10	11	21	43	13	8	9	17	4
1998–99	HC Železárny Třinec	ELH	44	20	23	43	55	10	4	4	8	18
1999–2000	HC Oceláři Třinec	ELH	42	14	20	34	32	4	1	0	1	28
2000–01	HC Oceláři Třinec	ELH	31	8	12	20	20	—	—	—	—	—
2000–01	HC Slavia Praha	ELH	19	9	9	18	8	11	8	8	16	10
2001–02	HC Slavia Praha	ELH	52	25	23	48	51	9	3	0	3	6
2002–03	HC Slavia Praha	ELH	13	4	0	4	8	—	—	—	—	—
2002–03	HC Lasselsberger Plzeň	ELH	23	12	5	17	41	—	—	—	—	—
2002–03	HC Sparta Praha	ELH	13	7	6	13	6	10	3	5	8	6
2003–04	HC Sparta Praha	ELH	19	11	7	18	6	13	0	2	2	18
2003–04	HC Dukla Jihlava	CZE.2	4	4	0	4	4	—	—	—	—	—
2004–05	Kärpät	SM-liiga	52	20	18	38	36	12	1	4	5	12
2005–06	Kärpät	SM-liiga	23	8	2	10	24	11	2	3	5	10
2006–07	Kärpät	SM-liiga	53	11	24	35	72	10	3	3	6	6
2007–08	HC Vítkovice Steel	ELH	51	19	16	35	79	—	—	—	—	—
2008–09	HC Vítkovice Steel	ELH	45	16	13	29	53	10	2	7	9	45
2009–10	HC Vítkovice Steel	ELH	52	14	19	33	16	16	3	7	10	8
2010–11	HC Vítkovice Steel	ELH	44	17	14	31	34	16	7	4	11	49
2011–12	HC Vítkovice Steel	ELH	35	14	18	32	4	7	6	0	6	4
2012–13	HC Vítkovice Steel	ELH	44	9	13	22	18	4	0	2	2	2
2013–14	HC Dukla Jihlava	CZE.2	3	1	3	4	4	—	—	—	—	—
ELH totals			738	321	302	623	675	133	54	53	107	208
SM-liiga totals			128	39	44	83	132	33	6	10	16	28

=== International ===
Year	Team	Event	GP	G	A	Pts	PIM
1992	Czechoslovakia	WJC	7	4	1	5	8
1996	Czech Republic	WC	8	2	3	5	6
1997	Czech Republic	WC	7	1	1	2	4
1999	Czech Republic	WC	10	6	2	8	12
2001	Czech Republic	WC	9	6	1	7	4
2002	Czech Republic	WC	7	2	2	4	2
Senior totals			41	17	9	26	28
