= Alexei Kudashov =

Russian ice hockey player

- Born: July 21, 1971 (age 54) Elektrostal, Russian SFSR, Soviet Union
- Height: 6 ft 0 in (183 cm)
- Weight: 183 lb (83 kg; 13 st 1 lb)
- Position: Center
- Shot: Right
- Played for: Kristall Elektrostal; Krylya Sovetov Moscow; Toronto Maple Leafs; St. John's Maple Leafs; Carolina Monarchs; Düsseldorfer EG; TPS Turku; Ak Bars Kazan; Dynamo Moscow; CSKA Moscow; Lokomotiv Yaroslavl; Khimik Mytishchi; HC MVD
- Current KHL coach: Avtomobilist Yekaterinburg
- Coached for: Atlant Moscow Oblast; Lokomotiv Yaroslavl; SKA Saint Petersburg; Russia; Dynamo Moscow
- National team: Russia
- NHL draft: 102nd overall, 1991; Toronto Maple Leafs
- Playing career: 1989–2012
- Coaching career: 2012–present

Alexei Nikolaevich Kudashov (Russian: Алексей Николаевич Кудашов; born July 21, 1971) is a Russian former professional ice hockey forward and current head coach for Avtomobilist Yekaterinburg of the Kontinental Hockey League (KHL).

== Playing career ==
Kudashov was drafted by the Toronto Maple Leafs in 1991 and played 25 games for the Leafs during the 1993–94 NHL season. After spending parts of the next two seasons in the American Hockey League, Kudashov continued his career in Europe, primarily in the Russian Superleague and Kontinental Hockey League. He captained Dynamo Moscow to a Gagarin Cup championship in 2012, his last season as a professional player.

== Career statistics ==
=== Regular season and playoffs ===
			Regular season					Playoffs
Season	Team	League	GP	G	A	Pts	PIM	GP	G	A	Pts	PIM
1986–87	Kristall Elektrostal	USSR-2	2	0	0	0	0	—	—	—	—	—
1987–88	Kristall Elektrostal	USSR-2	18	4	1	5	6	—	—	—	—	—
1988–89	Kristall Elektrostal	USSR-2	42	6	5	11	4	—	—	—	—	—
1989–90	Krylia Sovetov Moscow	USSR	45	0	5	5	14	—	—	—	—	—
1990–91	Krylia Sovetov Moscow	USSR	45	9	5	14	10	—	—	—	—	—
1991–92	Krylia Sovetov Moscow	CIS	36	8	16	24	12	6	1	0	1	2
1991–92	Kristall Elektrostal	CIS-2	2	0	0	0	0	—	—	—	—	—
1992–93	Krylia Sovetov Moscow	IHL	41	8	20	28	24	7	1	3	4	4
1993–94	Krylia Sovetov Moscow	IHL	1	2	0	2	0	—	—	—	—	—
1993–94	Toronto Maple Leafs	NHL	25	1	0	1	4	—	—	—	—	—
1993–94	St. John's Maple Leafs	AHL	27	7	15	22	21	—	—	—	—	—
1994–95	St. John's Maple Leafs	AHL	75	25	54	79	17	5	1	4	5	2
1995–96	Carolina Monarchs	AHL	33	7	22	29	18	—	—	—	—	—
1995–96	Düsseldorfer EG	DEL	9	7	8	15	4	13	5	5	10	14
1996–97	Düsseldorfer EG	DEL	48	13	16	29	14	4	3	1	4	2
1997–98	TPS	SM-l	48	8	31	39	34	4	0	0	0	4
1998–99	Ak Bars Kazan	RSL	41	8	8	16	30	13	5	2	7	4
1999–00	Dynamo Moscow	RSL	37	12	12	24	20	14	0	5	5	20
2000–01	Dynamo Moscow	RSL	44	12	17	29	40	—	—	—	—	—
2001–02	Dynamo Moscow	RSL	51	11	18	29	44	3	0	0	0	4
2002–03	Dynamo Moscow	RSL	37	12	12	24	34	3	2	1	3	16
2003–04	Dynamo Moscow	RSL	51	5	9	14	22	1	0	0	0	0
2004–05	Dynamo Moscow	RSL	10	0	6	6	2	—	—	—	—	—
2004–05	Dynamo–2 Moscow	RUS-3	3	1	4	5	2	—	—	—	—	—
2004–05	CSKA Moscow	RSL	30	8	14	22	26	—	—	—	—	—
2005–06	CSKA Moscow	RSL	49	5	23	28	48	7	1	2	3	10
2006–07	Lokomotiv Yaroslavl	RSL	24	5	10	15	24	7	1	0	1	0
2006–07	Khimik Mytishchi	RSL	21	0	3	3	18	—	—	—	—	—
2006–07	Khimik–2 Mytishchi	RUS-3	2	1	0	1	2	—	—	—	—	—
2007–08	Lokomotiv Yaroslavl	RSL	57	8	26	34	66	16	3	5	8	12
2008–09	Lokomotiv Yaroslavl	KHL	56	9	23	32	20	19	1	3	4	10
2009–10	HC MVD	KHL	36	8	14	22	6	—	—	—	—	—
2010–11	Dynamo Moscow	KHL	43	5	12	17	24	6	1	1	2	4
2011–12	Dynamo Moscow	KHL	37	3	3	6	31	4	0	1	1	0
NHL totals			25	1	0	1	4	—	—	—	—	—
RSL totals			452	86	148	234	374	64	12	15	27	66
KHL totals			172	25	52	77	88	29	2	5	7	14

=== International ===
Year	Team	Event	GP	G	A	Pts	PIM
1989	Soviet Union	EJC	6	5	1	6	2
1990	Soviet Union	WJC	7	2	1	3	0
1991	Soviet Union	WJC	7	2	8	10	6
1994	Russia	OLY	8	1	2	3	4
1998	Russia	WC	3	1	2	3	2
1999	Russia	WC	6	0	2	2	6
2000	Russia	WC	6	0	1	1	4
Junior totals			20	9	10	19	8
Senior totals			23	2	7	9	16
