= Christer Olsson =

Swedish ice hockey player and coach

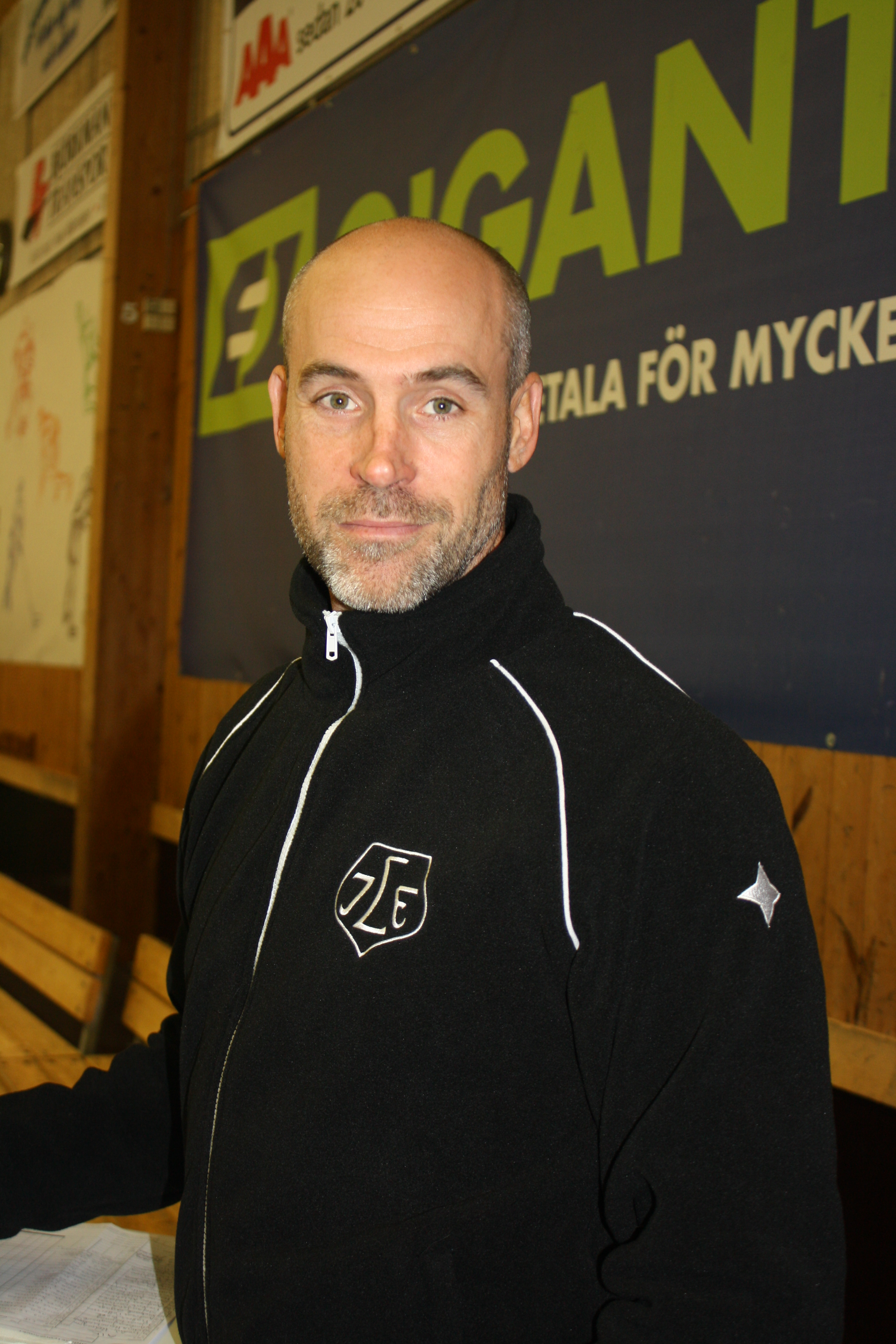
- Born: July 24, 1970 (age 56) Arboga, Sweden
- Height: 5 ft 11 in (180 cm)
- Weight: 198 lb (90 kg; 14 st 2 lb)
- Position: Defence
- Shot: Left
- Played for: Mora IK; Brynäs IF; St. Louis Blues; Ottawa Senators; Västra Frölunda HC; EC KAC; Leksands IF
- National team: Sweden
- NHL draft: 275th overall, 1993; St. Louis Blues
- Playing career: 1992–2005

Christer Lennart Olsson (born July 24, 1970) is a Swedish former professional ice hockey defenceman. He is the current head coach of VIK Västerås HK in the HockeyAllsvenskan (Allsv). Olsson played briefly in the National Hockey League (NHL) with the St. Louis Blues and Ottawa Senators.

== Playing career ==
Olsson was drafted by the Blues in the 11th round, 275th overall in the 1993 NHL entry draft. He played in Sweden for 2 years before splitting the 1995–1996 season with the Worcester Ice Cats of the AHL and making his debut with the Blues. The following season he was part of an infamous and extremely lopsided trade when he was traded by the Blues to the Ottawa Senators for Pavol Demitra. Demitra eventually became a scoring powerhouse with the Blues for a number of years while Olsson decided to go back to Sweden to play hockey after his short stint with the Senators that year.

Olsson played 7 more years in Sweden and one in Austria before retiring after the 2004–05 season.

== Coaching career ==
Since his retirement after the 2004–2005 season, Olsson directly coached Leksands IF. He has mostly been coaching Leksand's representation team, but he has also coached Leksand's under-20 team in two seasons. On April 20, 2011, Olsson was named the head coach of Leksand's representation team in the HockeyAllsvenskan. Olsson was sacked as Leksands IF coach in 2011 and then joined EC KAC of the Austrian Hockey League. He coached parts of two seasons with KAC before he was fired and then named coach of rival EBEL club, HC TWK Innsbruck.

After two seasons in Innsbruck, Olsson opted to return to his native Sweden, accepting a head coaching role with VIK Västerås HK of the Allsvenskan for the 2016–17 season.

== Career statistics ==
=== Regular season and playoffs ===
			Regular season					Playoffs
Season	Team	League	GP	G	A	Pts	PIM	GP	G	A	Pts	PIM
1988–89	IFK Arboga	SWE III	33	9	10	19	—	—	—	—	—	—
1989–90	Mora IK	SWE II	21	2	1	3	8	—	—	—	—	—
1990–91	Mora IK	SWE II	28	4	8	12	20	2	1	0	1	0
1991–92	Mora IK	SWE II	36	6	10	16	38	2	1	0	1	6
1992–93	Brynäs IF	SEL	22	4	4	8	18	—	—	—	—	—
1993–94	Brynäs IF	SEL	38	7	3	10	50	7	0	6	6	12
1994–95	Brynäs IF	SEL	39	7	5	12	20	14	2	6	8	16
1995–96	St. Louis Blues	NHL	26	2	8	10	14	3	0	0	0	0
1995–96	Worcester IceCats	AHL	39	7	7	14	22	—	—	—	—	—
1996–97	St. Louis Blues	NHL	5	0	1	1	0	—	—	—	—	—
1996–97	Worcester IceCats	AHL	2	0	0	0	0	—	—	—	—	—
1996–97	Ottawa Senators	NHL	25	2	3	5	10	—	—	—	—	—
1997–98	Västra Frölunda HC	SEL	45	13	8	21	54	7	0	1	1	18
1998–99	Västra Frölunda HC	SEL	47	5	11	16	48	4	0	1	1	4
1999–2000	EC KAC	IEHL	34	7	11	18	63	—	—	—	—	—
1999–2000	EC KAC	AUT	16	4	10	14	12	—	—	—	—	—
2000–01	Brynäs IF	SEL	46	9	7	16	28	4	0	0	0	12
2001–02	Brynäs IF	SEL	50	5	16	21	65	4	0	0	0	2
2002–03	Leksands IF	SEL	48	10	10	20	44	3	1	0	1	6
2003–04	Leksands IF	SEL	50	7	8	15	54	—	—	—	—	—
2004–05	Leksands IF	SWE II	3	0	1	1	0	—	—	—	—	—
SWE II totals			85	12	19	31	66	4	2	0	2	6
SEL totals			385	67	72	139	381	43	3	14	17	70

=== International ===
Year	Team	Event	GP	G	A	Pts	PIM
1995	Sweden	WC	8	2	1	3	4
1998	Sweden	WC	10	1	2	3	2
1999	Sweden	WC	10	1	2	3	20
2001	Sweden	WC	9	1	0	1	8
Senior totals			37	5	5	10	34
