= 1991–92 Czechoslovak Extraliga season =

Czechoslovak ice hockey season

The 1991–92 Czechoslovak Extraliga season was the 49th season of the Czechoslovak Extraliga, the top level of ice hockey in Czechoslovakia. 14 teams participated in the league, and Dukla Trencin won the championship.

== Regular season ==
=== West Group ===
Pl.	Team	GP	W	T	L	GF–GA	Pts
1.	TJ Škoda Plzeň	38	21	7	10	139:112	49
2.	CHZ Litvínov	38	19	7	12	166:138	45
3.	Dukla Jihlava	38	21	2	15	132:97	44
4.	Poldi SONP Kladno	38	16	10	12	134:138	42
5.	Sparta ČKD Prag	38	17	5	16	146:127	39
6.	Tesla Pardubice	38	17	5	16	130:123	39
7.	Zetor Brno	38	8	4	26	113:169	20

=== East Group ===
Pl.	Team	GP	W	T	L	GF–GA	Pts
1.	Dukla Trenčín	38	21	6	11	174:156	48
2.	TJ Vítkovice	38	17	7	14	168:158	41
3.	VSŽ Košice	38	16	5	17	140:130	37
4.	AC ZPS Zlín	38	13	10	15	124:140	36
5.	DS Olomouc	38	15	4	19	136:158	34
6.	Slovan CHZJD Bratislava	38	11	8	19	112:134	30
7.	ŠKP PS Poprad	38	11	6	21	118:152	28

== Playoffs ==
=== Qualification ===
- Dukla Jihlava – HC Slovan Bratislava 6:0 (2:0,1:0,3:0)
- Dukla Jihlava – HC Slovan Bratislava 4:2 (1:0,0:1,3:1)
- HC Slovan Bratislava – Dukla Jihlava 1:2 (1:0,0:1,0:1)
- Poldi Kladno – DS Olomouc 5:4 (0:0,2:2,3:2)
- Poldi Kladno – DS Olomouc 2:1 (0:0,2:0,0:1)
- DS Olomouc – Poldi Kladno 4:5 (1:0,2:1,1:4)
- AC ZPS Zlín – Sparta ČKD Prag 2:1 SN (0:1,1:0,0:0,0:0)
- AC ZPS Zlín – Sparta ČKD Prag 4:8 (2:3,2:4,0:1)
- Sparta ČKD Prag – AC ZPS Zlín 4:1 (1:0,1:1,2:0)
- Sparta ČKD Prag – AC ZPS Zlín 4:3 SN (1:1,0:1,2:1,0:0)
- VSŽ Košice – HC Pardubice 3:2 (0:1,1:0,2:1)
- VSŽ Košice – HC Pardubice 4:3 PP (1:1,1:1,1:1,1:0)
- HC Pardubice – VSŽ Košice 6:2 (1:0,5:0,0:2)
- HC Pardubice – VSŽ Košice 2:1 (0:1,1:0,1:0)
- VSŽ Košice – HC Pardubice 5:0 (0:0,2:0,3:0)

=== Quarterfinal ===
- Dukla Trenčín – Poldi Kladno 10:4 (4:3,2:0,4:1)
- Dukla Trenčín – Poldi Kladno 10:3 (1:0,3:1,6:2)
- Poldi Kladno – Dukla Trenčín 3:0 (0:0,2:0,1:0)
- Poldi Kladno – Dukla Trenčín 5:2 (1:1,1:1,3:0)
- Dukla Trenčín – Poldi Kladno 5:1 (2:1,3:0,0:0)
- Vítkovice – Dukla Jihlava 4:6 (1:4,2:2,1:0)
- Vítkovice – Dukla Jihlava 6:3 (2:1,3:1,1:1)
- Dukla Jihlava – Vítkovice 6:3 (1:1,2:1,3:1)
- Dukla Jihlava – Vítkovice 2:6 (0:1,1:4,1:1)
- Vítkovice – Dukla Jihlava 6:2 (2:1,3:0,1:1)
- HC Škoda Plzeň – HC Sparta Praha 3:2 PP (1:1,1:1,0:0,1:0)
- HC Škoda Plzeň – HC Sparta Praha 4:3 (1:1,1:2,2:0)
- HC Sparta Praha – HC Škoda Plzeň 4:2 (2:0,2:1,0:1)
- HC Sparta Praha – HC Škoda Plzeň 4:1 (2:0,1:1,1:0)
- HC Škoda Plzeň – HC Sparta Praha 4:1 (0:1,3:0,1:0)
- HC Chemopetrol Litvínov – VSŽ Košice 7:1 (3:0,3:0,1:1)
- HC Chemopetrol Litvínov – VSŽ Košice 7:2 (3:1,2:0,2:1)
- VSŽ Košice – HC Chemopetrol Litvínov 4:5 (2:0,2:3,0:2)

=== Semifinal ===
- HC Škoda Plzeň – Vítkovice 6:3 (2:1,1:2,3:0)
- HC Škoda Plzeň – Vítkovice 3:4 SN (1:2,1:0,1:1,0:0)
- Vítkovice – HC Škoda Plzeň 8:0 (0:0,5:0,3:0)
- Vítkovice – HC Škoda Plzeň 0:3 (0:1,0:2,0:0)
- HC Škoda Plzeň – Vítkovice 5:3 (1:0,2:3,2:0)
- Dukla Trenčín – HC Chemopetrol Litvínov 3:5 (1:1,2:2,0:2)
- Dukla Trenčín – HC Chemopetrol Litvínov 3:1 (0:0,3:0,0:1)
- HC Chemopetrol Litvínov – Dukla Trenčín 4:5 PP (2:2,1:1,1:1,0:1)
- HC Chemopetrol Litvínov – Dukla Trenčín 5:6 (2:2,0:3,3:1)

=== Final ===
- HC Škoda Plzeň – Dukla Trenčín 2:5 (0:2,1:1,1:2)
- HC Škoda Plzeň – Dukla Trenčín 4:3 SN (0:1,2:2,1:0,0:0)
- Dukla Trenčín – HC Škoda Plzeň 6:4 (3:0,0:2,3:2)
- Dukla Trenčín – HC Škoda Plzeň 5:3 (1:1,2:2,2:0)

=== 3rd place ===
- Vítkovice – HC Chemopetrol Litvínov 2:4 (1:2,1:0,0:2)
- HC Chemopetrol Litvínov – Vítkovice 12:5 (4:3,3:0,5:2)
