= Martin Procházka =

Czech ice hockey player

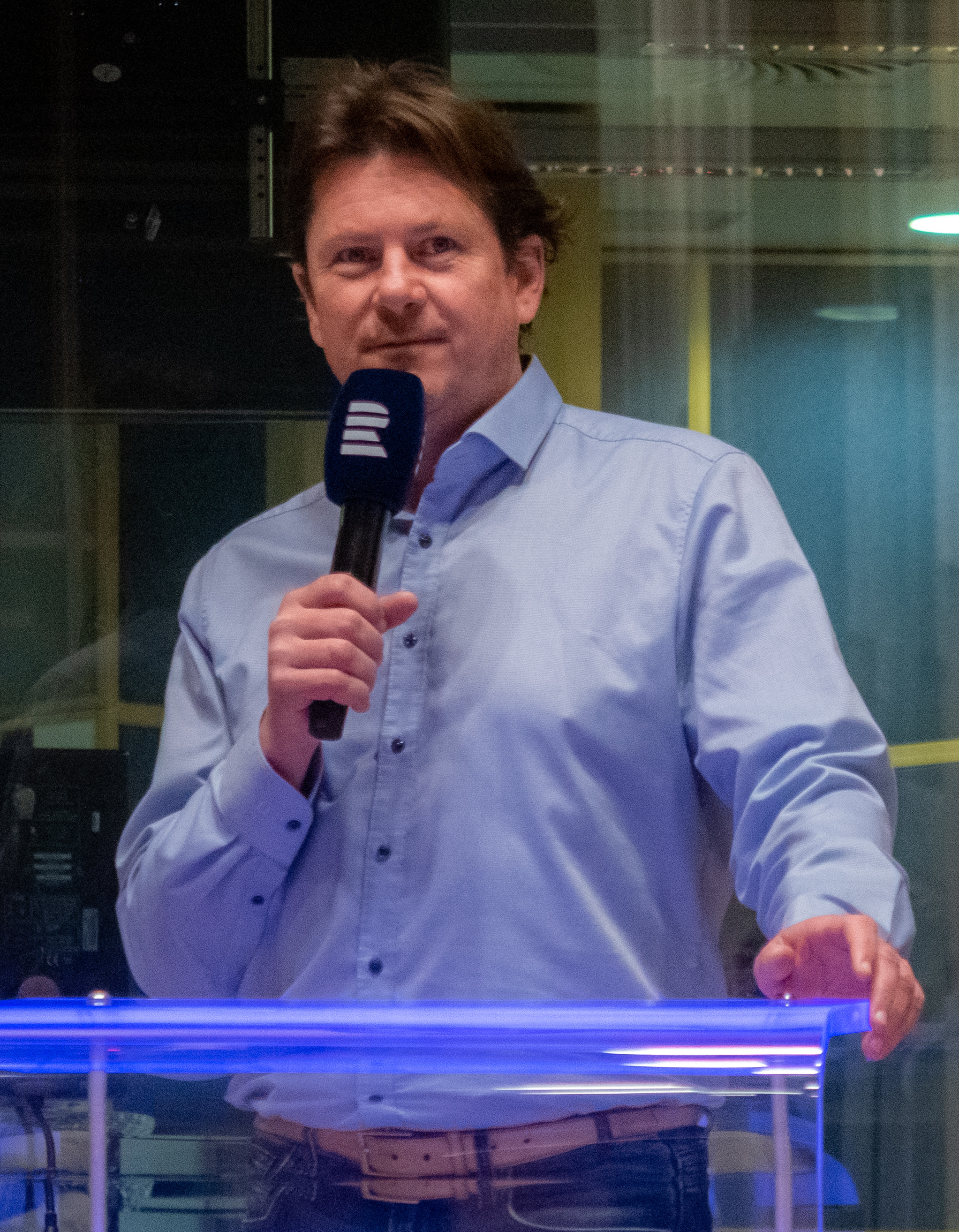
- Procházka in 2025
- Born: March 3, 1972 (age 54) Slaný, Czechoslovakia
- Height: 5 ft 11 in (180 cm)
- Weight: 180 lb (82 kg; 12 st 12 lb)
- Position: Right wing
- Shot: Right
- Played for: Kladno; AIK IF; Toronto Maple Leafs; VHK Vsetín; Atlanta Thrashers; HC Vítkovice; Avangard Omsk; Khimik Voskresensk
- National team: Czech Republic
- NHL draft: 135th overall, 1991; Toronto Maple Leafs
- Playing career: 1990–2010

Martin Procházka (Czech pronunciation: [ˈmarcɪn ˈproxaːska], born March 3, 1972, in Slaný, Czechoslovakia) is a Czech former professional ice hockey player. Procházka was drafted 135th overall by the Toronto Maple Leafs in the 1991 NHL entry draft and played 32 games in the National Hockey League (NHL) for the Maple Leafs and Atlanta Thrashers. In his NHL career, he scored two goals and five assists for seven points, collecting eight penalty minutes. He tallied an assist on the first goal in Atlanta Thrashers history, a 4–1 loss to the New Jersey Devils on October 2, 1999, his only point as a Thrasher. He has also had spells in Sweden's Elitserien for AIK Hockey and the Russian Super League (RSL) for Avangard Omsk and Khimik Voskresensk. He won a gold medal with the Czech Republic in the 1998 Winter Olympics.

Procházka also won the World Championships four times with the Czech Republic, in 1996, 1999, 2000 and 2001. He also won the Czech Extraliga with VHK Vsetín in 1999.

Olympic medal record

Men's ice hockey
Gold medal – first place	1998 Nagano	Ice hockey

== Career statistics ==
=== Regular season and playoffs ===
			Regular season					Playoffs
Season	Team	League	GP	G	A	Pts	PIM	GP	G	A	Pts	PIM
1989–90	Poldi SONP Kladno	TCH	41	16	10	26	8	8	2	1	3	2
1990–91	Poldi SONP Kladno	TCH	50	19	9	28	43	—	—	—	—	—
1991–92	ASD Dukla Jihlava	TCH	36	14	9	23	—	8	3	2	5	—
1992–93	Poldi SONP Kladno	TCH	37	22	11	33	8	—	—	—	—	—
1993–94	Poldi SONP Kladno	ELH	43	24	16	40	18	2	2	0	2	0
1994–95	Poldi SONP Kladno	ELH	41	25	33	58	20	11	8	4	12	4
1995–96	HC Poldi Kladno	ELH	37	15	28	43	14	8	2	4	6	2
1996–97	AIK	SEL	49	16	23	39	38	7	2	3	5	8
1997–98	Toronto Maple Leafs	NHL	29	2	4	6	8	—	—	—	—	—
1998–99	HC Slovnaft Vsetín	ELH	46	20	26	46	10	12	11	9	20	0
1999–2000	Atlanta Thrashers	NHL	3	0	1	1	0	—	—	—	—	—
1999–00	HC Slovnaft Vsetín	ELH	31	10	10	20	18	9	2	0	2	0
2000–01	HC Vítkovice	ELH	32	15	16	31	12	10	4	2	6	0
2001–02	HC Vítkovice	ELH	20	6	11	17	4	—	—	—	—	—
2001–02	Avangard Omsk	RSL	31	8	6	14	6	11	2	1	3	2
2002–03	Avangard Omsk	RSL	35	9	9	18	12	3	1	0	1	4
2003–04	HC Rabat Kladno	ELH	23	5	6	11	2	—	—	—	—	—
2003–04	Khimik Voskresensk	RSL	3	0	0	0	2	—	—	—	—	—
2004–05	HC Rabat Kladno	ELH	45	22	16	38	10	7	3	2	5	2
2005–06	HC Rabat Kladno	ELH	40	9	15	24	18	—	—	—	—	—
2006–07	HC Rabat Kladno	ELH	49	35	16	51	40	3	1	0	1	2
2007–08	HC Kladno	ELH	52	21	8	29	26	7	6	3	9	6
2008–09	HC Kladno	ELH	42	13	15	28	12	10	4	2	6	4
2009–10	HC Kladno	ELH	30	3	3	6	48	10	0	1	1	4
2011–12	EV Regensburg	GER III	38	18	21	39	20	8	1	1	2	4
TCH totals			164	71	39	110	—	16	5	3	8	—
ELH totals			531	223	219	442	252	89	43	27	70	24
NHL totals			32	2	5	7	8	—	—	—	—	—

=== International ===
Year	Team	Event	GP	G	A	Pts	PIM
1990	Czechoslovakia	EJC	6	2	4	6	2
1990	Czechoslovakia	WJC	7	2	5	7	2
1991	Czechoslovakia	WJC	7	4	1	5	0
1992	Czechoslovakia	WJC	7	0	2	2	0
1995	Czech Republic	WC	8	2	1	3	2
1996	Czech Republic	WCH	2	0	0	0	0
1996	Czech Republic	WC	8	3	3	6	2
1997	Czech Republic	WC	9	7	7	14	4
1998	Czech Republic	OG	6	1	1	2	0
1998	Czech Republic	WC	8	3	5	8	14
1999	Czech Republic	WC	10	2	4	6	0
2000	Czech Republic	WC	9	2	3	5	6
2001	Czech Republic	WC	9	4	2	6	2
2002	Czech Republic	WC	7	4	3	7	0
Junior totals			27	11	9	20	8
Senior totals			76	28	29	57	30
