= 2008 IIHF European Champions Cup =

Tournament details
- Host country: Russia
- Venue: 1 (in 1 host city)
- Dates: January 10 - January 13
- Teams: 6

Final positions
- Champions: (Russia) Metallurg Magnitogorsk (1st title)
- Runners-up: (Czech Republic) HC Sparta Prague

Tournament statistics
- Games played: 7
- Goals scored: 36 (5.14 per game)
- Attendance: 25,580 (3,654 per game)
- Scoring leader: (Czech Republic) Tomáš Netík (7 points)

Awards
- MVP: (Russia) Vitali Atyushov

The 2008 IIHF European Champions Cup was the fourth and the last edition of IIHF European Champions Cup. It was held in Saint Petersburg at the Ice Palace arena, from January 10 to January 13. The champions of 2007 of the six strongest hockey nations of Europe participate: Metallurg Magnitogorsk (RUS), Modo Hockey (SWE), HC Slovan Bratislava (SVK), Kärpät (FIN), HC Sparta Prague (CZE), HC Davos (SUI).

Metallurg won its first European Champions Cup, and third European club championship following European Hockey League titles in 1999 and 2000.

== Group A ==
- Ivan Hlinka Division

=== Standings ===
Pos	Team	Pld	W	OTW	OTL	L	GF	GA	GD	Pts
1	(Czech Republic) HC Sparta Prague	2	2	0	0	0	11	7	+4	6
2	(Finland) Kärpät	2	1	0	0	1	9	6	+3	3
3	(Switzerland) HC Davos	2	0	0	0	2	5	12	−7	0

=== Results ===
All times local (CET/UTC +1)

January 10, 2008; 15:00	Kärpät (Finland)	3 – 5 (0 - 2, 1 - 2, 2 - 1)	(Czech Republic) HC Sparta Prague	Ice Palace; Attendance: 2,100

Janne Pesonen 30:03 (PP); Michal Broš 42:34 (EQ); Michal Broš 59:29 (EQ) / Goals / 04:10 (PP) Petr Ton; 17:58 (PP) Tibor Melichárek; 24:50 (EQ) Jakub Langhammer; 32:26 (PP) Tomáš Netík; 50:25 (PP) Petr Ton

January 11, 2008; 15:00	HC Sparta Prague (Czech Republic)	6 – 4 (1 - 2, 3 - 1, 2 - 1)	(Switzerland) HC Davos	Ice Palace; Attendance: 1,326

Tomáš Netík 06:31 (PP); Martin Štrba 29:00 (PP); Jiří Vykoukal 30:31 (EQ); Tomáš Netík 34:56 (EQ); Tomáš Netík 40:53 (EQ); Tibor Melichárek 59:36 (EN) / Goals / 00:41 (EQ) Mike Maneluk; 13:17 (PP) Josef Marha; 38:20 (EQ) Dino Wieser; 52:32 (EQ) Sven Helfenstein

January 12, 2008; 15:00	HC Davos (Switzerland)	1 – 6 (0 - 1, 1 - 3, 0 - 2)	(Finland) Kärpät	Ice Palace; Attendance: 2,330

Alexandre Daigle 33:07 / Goals / 06:30 (EQ) Teemu Normio; 23:24 (PS) Janne Pesonen; 28:54 (EQ) Janne Pesonen; 37:48 (EQ) Antti Aarnio; 44:41 (EQ) Tommi Paakkolanvaara; 58:15 (EQ) Jan Novák

== Group B ==
- Alexander Ragulin Division

=== Standings ===
Pos	Team	Pld	W	OTW	OTL	L	GF	GA	GD	Pts
1	(Russia) Metallurg Magnitogorsk	2	1	1	0	0	5	1	+4	5
2	(Slovakia) HC Slovan Bratislava	2	1	0	1	0	5	3	+2	4
3	(Sweden) Modo Hockey	2	0	0	0	2	1	7	−6	0

=== Results ===
All times local (CET/UTC +1)

January 10, 2008; 18:30	Metallurg Magnitogorsk (Russia)	3 – 0 (2 - 0, 1 - 0, 0 - 0)	(Sweden) Modo Hockey	Ice Palace; Attendance: 4,910

Igor Mirnov 08:51 (EQ); Nikolai Kulemin 16:49 (EQ); Jaroslav Kudrna 38:00 (EQ) / Goals

January 11, 2008; 18:30	Modo Hockey (Sweden)	1 – 4 (1 - 0, 0 - 3, 0 - 1)	(Slovakia) HC Slovan Bratislava	Ice Palace; Attendance: 2,541

Magnus Wernblom 10:53 (PP) / Goals / 22:14 (EQ) Dušan Devečka; 22:46 (EQ) Martin Hujsa; 24:01 (EQ) Michal Hreus; 51:07 (EQ) Michal Sersen

January 12, 2008; 18:30	HC Slovan Bratislava (Slovakia)	1 – 2 (GWS) (1 - 0, 0 - 0, 0 - 1, 0 - 0, 0 - 1)	(Russia) Metallurg Magnitogorsk	Ice Palace; Attendance: 6,481

Marek Uram 17:24 (EQ) / Goals / 48:51 (PP) Igor Korolev; 65:00 (GW) Alexei Kaigorodov

== Gold medal game ==
Metallurg Magnitogorsk qualified for the final of the European Champions Cup thanks to a shootout win against Slovan Bratislava. The Slovaks were close to a surprise but the Russians could overcome the hard-working opponent at the end of the game. Metallurg played HC Sparta Prague in Sunday’s gold medal game.

January 13, 2008; 18:30	HC Sparta Prague (Czech Republic)	2 – 5 (1 - 1, 1 - 2, 0 - 2)	(Russia) Metallurg Magnitogorsk	Ice Palace; Attendance: 9,732

Martin Podlešák 19:21 (EQ); Jiří Vykoukal 30:02 (PP) / Goals / 02:58 (PP) Jan Marek; 26:19 (PP) Jan Marek; 38:36 (EQ) Igor Mironov; 58:34 (EQ) Igor Mironov; 59:03 (EQ) Alexei Kaigorodov

2008 IIHF European Champions Cup Winners
(Russia)
Metallurg Magnitogorsk
First title
