= 2002 Česká pojišťovna Cup =

2002 Česká Pojišťovna Cup
Tournament details
- Host countries: Czech Republic; Sweden
- Cities: Zlín; Karlstad
- Venues: 2 (in 2 host cities)
- Dates: 5–8 September 2002
- Teams: 4

Final positions
- Champions: Russia (1st title)
- Runners-up: Czech Republic
- Third place: Sweden
- Fourth place: Finland

Tournament statistics
- Games played: 6
- Goals scored: 30 (5 per game)
- Attendance: 21,539 (3,590 per game)
- Scoring leader: (Czech Republic) Radek Duda (5 points)

The 2002 Česká Pojišťovna Cup was played between 5 and 8 September 2002. The Czech Republic, Finland, Sweden and Russia played a round-robin for a total of three games per team and six games in total. Five of the matches were played in Zimní stadion Luďka Čajky in Zlín, Czech Republic, and one match in Löfbergs Lila Arena in Karlstad, Sweden. The tournament was won by Russia. The tournament was part of 2002–03 Euro Hockey Tour.

== Standings ==
Pos	Team	Pld	W	OTW	OTL	L	GF	GA	GD	Pts
1	Russia	3	1	1	1	0	5	3	+2	6
2	Czech Republic	3	2	0	0	1	14	10	+4	6
3	Sweden	3	1	0	1	1	8	8	0	4
4	Finland	3	0	1	0	2	3	9	−6	2

Source: swehockey

== Games ==
All times are local. Zlín – (Central European Time – UTC+1) Karlstad – (Central European Time – UTC+11)

5 September 2002; 17:30	Czech Republic	1-3 (0-0, 1-2, 0-1)	Russia	Zimní stadion Luďka Čajky, Zlín; Attendance: 3,514

Game reference

Petr Bříza
Goalies
Maksim Sokolov
Referee:
(Sweden) Thomas Andersson
Linesmen:
(Czech Republic) Vaclav Cesky
(Czech Republic) Tomas Tomas

27:01 – Josef Beránek (Michal Sýkora)	1-0
	1-1	36:45 – Aleksander Suglobov (Igor Shadilov)
	1-2	37:02 – Vladislav Bulin (Sergei Korolyov, Anton But)
	1-3	48:55 – Igor Grigorenko (Sergei Zinovyev, Alexander Korolyuk)

16 min
Penalties
10 min
18
Shots
26

5 September 2002; 19:00	Sweden	2-0 (0-0, 1-0, 1-0)	Finland	Löfbergs Lila Arena, Karlstad; Attendance: 6,952

Game reference
Stefan Liv	Goalies	Fredrik Norrena	Referee: (Russia) Anatoliy Sakharov; Linesmen: (Sweden) Mikael Ljungqvist (Sweden) Fredrik Carlman
28:10 – Jörgen Jönsson (Thomas Rhodin) / 1-0; 45:24 – Pierre Hedin (Thomas Rhodin) / 2-0			Referee: (Russia) Anatoliy Sakharov; Linesmen: (Sweden) Mikael Ljungqvist (Sweden) Fredrik Carlman
6 min	Penalties	2 min	Referee: (Russia) Anatoliy Sakharov; Linesmen: (Sweden) Mikael Ljungqvist (Sweden) Fredrik Carlman
21	Shots	32	Referee: (Russia) Anatoliy Sakharov; Linesmen: (Sweden) Mikael Ljungqvist (Sweden) Fredrik Carlman

7 September 2002; 13:30	Sweden	1-2 GWS (1-0, 0-0, 0-1) (OT: 0–0) (SO: 0–1)	Russia	Zimní stadion Luďka Čajky, Zlín; Attendance: 1,123

Game reference
Rolf Wanhainen	Goalies	Maxim Sokolov
01:38 – Daniel Rudslätt (Pär Bäcker) / 1-0; / 1-1 / 48:33 – Alexander Perezhogin
Jönsson (miss); Davidsson (miss)	Shootout	(miss) Zinovyev; (miss) Grigorenko
14 min	Penalties	14 min
34	Shots	23

7 September 2002; 17:30	Finland	2-7 (1-2, 1-2, 0-3)	Czech Republic	Zimní stadion Luďka Čajky, Zlín; Attendance: 4,700

Game reference

Niklas Bäckström
Goalies
Petr Bříza

00:16 – Eero Somervuori (Marko Tuomainen)	1-0
	1-1	01:37 – Ondřej Kratěna (Jaroslav Balaštík)
	1-2	17:21 – Josef Beránek (Radek Duda)
	1-3	24:13 – Richard Kral (Tomáš Vlasák) (PP)
29:56 – Petri Pakaslahti (Janne Niskala)	2-3
	2-4	37:11 – František Kučera (Radek Duda, Tomáš Kucharčík)
	2-5	41:18 – Ondřej Kratěna (Michal Broš, Jaroslav Balaštík)
	2-6	41:31 – Tomáš Vlasák (Richard Kral, David Moravec)
	2-7	53:01 – Tomáš Vlasák (Richard Kral, Martin Richter)

12 min
Penalties
12 min
32
Shots
25

8 September 2002; 13:30	Russia	0-1 OT (0-0, 0-0, 0-0) (OT: 0–1)	Finland	Zimní stadion Luďka Čajky, Zlín; Attendance: 350

Game reference
Maxim Sokolov	Goalies	Fredrik Norrena	Referee: (Czech Republic) Milan Minar; Linesmen: (Czech Republic) Stanislav Barvir (Czech Republic) Pavel Blumel
0-1 / 60:57 – Timo Pärssinen (Tommi Miettinen)			Referee: (Czech Republic) Milan Minar; Linesmen: (Czech Republic) Stanislav Barvir (Czech Republic) Pavel Blumel
33 min	Penalties	12 min	Referee: (Czech Republic) Milan Minar; Linesmen: (Czech Republic) Stanislav Barvir (Czech Republic) Pavel Blumel
26	Shots	33	Referee: (Czech Republic) Milan Minar; Linesmen: (Czech Republic) Stanislav Barvir (Czech Republic) Pavel Blumel

8 September 2002; 13:30	Czech Republic	6-5 (2-2, 2-3, 2-0)	Sweden	Zimní stadion Luďka Čajky, Zlín; Attendance: 4,900

Game reference

Petr Bříza
Goalies
Stefan Liv
Referee:
(Russia) Mikhail Buturlin
Linesmen:
(Czech Republic) Jaromir Blaha
(Czech Republic) Roman Pouzar

	0-1	06:59 – Mika Hannula
07:41 – David Moravec (Richard Kral)	1-1
	1-2	10:29 – Niklas Andersson (Magnus Kahnberg, Pär Bäcker)
13:29 – Josef Beránek (Radek Duda, Tomáš Kucharčík)	2-2
	2-3	27:09 – Magnus Johansson (Jörgen Jönsson)
	2-4	28:13 – Magnus Kahnberg (Pär Bäcker)
30:23 – Radek Duda (Tomáš Kucharčík) (SHG)	3-4
	3-5	38:15 – Greger Artursson (Thomas Rhodin) (PP)
38:49 – Jaroslav Balaštík (Marek Židlický)	4-5
43:07 – Petr Kadlec (Josef Beránek)	5-5
46:52 – Radek Duda (Marek Židlický, Michal Sýkora) (PP)	6-5

4 min
Penalties
10 min
23
Shots
33

== Scoring leaders ==
Pos	Player	Country	GP	G	A	Pts	+/−	PIM	POS
1	Radek Duda	Czech Republic	3	2	3	5	+5	2	RW
2	Josef Beránek	Czech Republic	3	3	1	4	+5	0	RW
3	Richard Král	Czech Republic	3	1	3	4	+3	0	CE
4	Tomáš Vlasák	Czech Republic	3	2	1	3	+3	0	LW
5	Jaroslav Balaštík	Czech Republic	3	1	2	3	+3	2	RW

GP = Games played; G = Goals; A = Assists; Pts = Points; +/− = Plus/minus; PIM = Penalties in minutes; POS = Position
Source: swehockey

== Goaltending leaders ==
Pos	Player	Country	TOI	GA	GAA	Sv%	SO
1	Teemu Lassila	Finland	103:25	3	1.74	94.44	0
2	Henrik Lundqvist	Sweden	125:00	4	1.92	92.73	0
3	Maksim Sokolov	Russia	185:01	6	1.95	91.78	0
4	Roman Málek	Czech Republic	125:01	5	2.40	88.89	0
5	Niklas Bäckström	Finland	75:50	5	3.96	84.38	0

TOI = Time on ice (minutes:seconds); SA = Shots against; GA = Goals against; GAA = Goals Against Average; Sv% = Save percentage; SO = Shutouts
Source: swehockey

== Tournament awards ==
The tournament directorate named the following players in the tournament 2002:

- Best goalkeeper: (Russia) Maksim Sokolov
- Best defenceman: (Sweden) Ronnie Sundin
- Best forward: (Czech Republic) Radek Duda

Media All-Star Team:

- Goaltender: (Russia) Maksim Sokolov
- Defence: (Finland) Denis Grebeshkov, (Sweden) Thomas Rhodin
- Forwards: (Russia) Aleksander Suglobov, (Russia) Ivan Nepryaev, (Czech Republic) Radek Duda
