= Čermák =

Čermák (feminine: Čermáková) is a Czech surname. The word čermák is a colloquial name for the bird common redstart, but there is also a theory that the name was derived from the Old Czech word čermný ('red'), which referred to someone with red hair, someone who turned red, or who cultivated red soil, etc. Notable people with the surname include:

- Adrián Čermák (born 1993), Slovak footballer
- Aleš Čermák (born 1994), Czech footballer
- Anton Cermak (1873–1933), American politician
- Evžen Čermák (1932–2018), Czech alpine skier
- František Čermák (born 1976), Czech tennis player
- František Čermák (painter) (1822–1884), Czech painter
- Hynek Čermák (born 1973), Czech actor
- Jaroslav Čermák (1929–2011), Czech resistance fighter
- Jaroslav Čermák (painter) (1831–1878), Czech painter
- Jiřina Čermáková (1944–2019), Czech field hockey player
- Karl Čermak (1888–1924), German politician
- Leoš Čermák (born 1978), Czech ice hockey player
- Marcel Čermák (born 1998), Czech footballer
- Miloslav Čermák (born 1986), Czech ice hockey player
- Ota Čermák (1919–1963), Czech organist
- Petr Čermák (born 1942), Czech rower
- Tomáš Čermák (1943–2026), Czech engineer, rector of the Technical University of Ostrava
- Vladimír Čermák (1929–2004), Czech philosopher, politologist, lawyer and judge

== See also ==
- Leokadia Makarska-Čermák, Polish painter and designer
