= 2005 Karjala Tournament =

Tournament details
- Host countries: Finland; Sweden
- Cities: Helsinki; Jönköping
- Venues: 2 (in 2 host cities)
- Dates: 10-13 November 2005
- Teams: 4

Final positions
- Champions: Finland (9th title)
- Runners-up: Sweden
- Third place: Russia
- Fourth place: Czech Republic

Tournament statistics
- Games played: 6
- Goals scored: 38 (6.33 per game)
- Attendance: 46,797 (7,800 per game)
- Scoring leader(s): (Russia) Andrei Taratukhin (Russia) Alexei Mikhnov (4 points)

The 2005 Karjala Tournament was played between 10 and 13 November 2005. The Czech Republic, Finland, Sweden and Russia played a round-robin for a total of three games per team and six games in total. One game was played in Kinnarps Arena, Jönköping, Sweden (Sweden vs Russia) all the other games was played in Hartwall Areena, Helsinki. The tournament was part of the 2005–06 Euro Hockey Tour.

Finland won the tournament for eight time in a row, defeating Sverige, 2-1, in the final round.

== Standings ==
Pos	Team	Pld	W	OTW	SOW	OTL	SOL	L	GF	GA	GD	Pts
1	Finland	3	1	0	1	0	0	1	7	9	−2	5
2	Sweden	3	1	1	0	0	0	1	10	7	+3	5
3	Russia	3	1	0	0	1	1	0	9	9	0	5
4	Czech Republic	3	1	0	0	0	0	2	12	13	−1	3

Source: flashscore

== Games ==
Helsinki – (Eastern European Time – UTC+2) Jönköping – (Central European Time – UTC+1)

10 November 2005; 17:30	Finland	3-2 GWS (0-0, 0-1, 2-1)	Russia	Hartwall Areena, Helsinki; Attendance: 6,145

Game reference

Fredrik Norrena
Goalies
Maksim Sokolov
Referee:
(Sweden) Christer Lärking
Linesmen:
(Finland) Antti Orelma
(Finland) Stefan Fonselius

	0-1	25:09 – Sergueï Krivokrasov (Andreï Taratukhin, Alekseï Mikhnov)
	0-2	52:45 – Alekseï Mikhnov (Andreï Taratukhin, Vladimir Antipov)
54:42 – Toni Söderholm	1-2
55:58 – Jukka Voutilainen (Jukka Hentunen)	2-2

Nummelin (miss)
Salmelainen (miss)
Kallio
Shootout
Morozov (miss)
Mozyakin (miss)
Semin (miss)
8 min
Penalties
12 min
43
Shots
22

10 November 2005; 19:00	Sweden	6-3 (1-3, 3-0, 2-0)	Czech Republic	Kinnarps Arena, Jönköping; Attendance: 6,944

Game reference

Stefan Liv
Goalies
Milan Hnilicka
Referee:
(Russia) Sergueï Karabanov
Linesmen:
(Sweden) Per Svensson
(Sweden) Fredrik Ulriksson

	0-1	09:13 – Petr Ton (PP)
10:26 – Christian Berglund (Magnus Johansson) (PP)	1-1
	1-2	12:17 – Miroslav Horava (Jan Hejda) (PP)
	1-3	14:10 – Miroslav Horava (Martin Sevc) (PP)
23:23 – Mika Hannul (Jörgen Jönsson)	2-3
29:03 – Josef Boumedienne (Kenny Jönsson)	3-3
30:11 – Christian Berglund (Andreas Karlsson, Björn Melin)	4-3
54:49 – Andreas Johansson (Kenny Jönsson, Per Hållberg)	5-3
57:43 – Marcus Ragnarsson (Mika Hannula)	6-3

14 min
Penalties
14 min
36
Shots
18

12 November 2005; 16:30	Sweden	3-2 OT (0-0, 0-1, 2-1) (OT: 1–0)	Russia	Hartwall Areena, Helsinki; Attendance: 5,531

Game reference

Johan Holmqvist
Goalies
Sergei Zvyagin
Referee:
(Finland) Sami Partanen
Linesmen:
(Finland) Jussi Terho
(Finland) Mikko Kekäläinen

	0-1	22:58 – Evgueni Gladskikh (Stanislav Chistov)
	0-2	54:36 – Andreï Taratukhin (Alekseï Morozov, Vadim Khomitsky) (PP)
55:46 – Björn Melin (PP)	1-2
57:42 – Magnus Kahnberg (Jörgen Jönsson)	2-2
61:12 – Mika Hannula (Johan Davidsson)	3-2

12 min
Penalties
20 min
31
Shots
18

12 November 2005; 18:30	Finland	2–6 (2-3, 0-2, 0-1)	Czech Republic	Hartwall Areena, Helsinki; Attendance: 11,885

Game reference

Miika Wiikman Fredrik Norrena
Goalies
Milan Hnilicka Marek Pinc
Referee:
(Sweden)
Linesmen:
(Sweden)
(Sweden)

06:01 – Lasse Kukkonen (Jukka Hentunen, Timo Pärssinen) (PP)	1-0
	1-1	06:29 – Jiri Burger (Miroslav Horava, Vaclav Novak)
	1-2	13:15 – Jaroslav Kalla
18:14 – Jukka Hentunen (Timo Pärssinen)	2-2
	2-3	26:14 – Vaclav Skuhravy (Tomas Rolinek)
	2-4	38:26 – Jaroslav Hlinka (Martin Sevc)
	2-5	39:37 – Jaroslav Kalla (Tomas Rolinek, Tomas Vlasak)
	2-6	56:36 – Tomas Rolinek (Vaclav Novak)

13 November 2005; 15:00	Czech Republic	3-5 (1-3, 1-1, 1-1)	Russia	Hartwall Areena, Helsinki; Attendance: 5,514

Game reference

Marek Pinc
Goalies
Maksim Sokolov
Referee:
(Finland) Jyri Rönn
Linesmen:
(Finland) Mikko Kekäläinen
(Finland) Juha Kautto

	0-1	08:18 – Igor Emeleev (Alekseï Morozov)
	0-2	11:16 – Andreï Taratukhin (Alekseï Mikhnov)
	0-3	12:01 – Sergueï Mozyakin
19:29 – Robert Kantor (Miroslav Horava) (PP)	1-3
	1-4	37:43 – Alekseï Mikhnov (Vladimir Antipov)
38:45 – Petr Tenkrat (Ladislav Kohn, Michal Bros)	2-4
	2-5	46:53 – Sergueï Zhukov (Aleksandr Semin, Igor Emeleev)
50:09 – Ladislav Kohn (Petr Tenkrat)	3-5

12 min
Penalties
8 min
22
Shots
28

13 November 2005; 18:30	Finland	2-1 (2-0, 0-1, 0-0)	Sweden	Hartwall Areena, Helsinki; Attendance: 10,778

Game reference

Fredrik Norrena
Goalies
Stefan Liv
Referee:
(Russia) Sergeï Karabanov
Linesmen:
(Finland) Stefan Fonselius
(Finland) Antti Hämäläinen

08:20 – Riku Hahl (Timo Pärssinen, Jukka Hentunen)	1-0
14:58 – Tony Salmelainen (Janne Hauhtonen, Kimmo Kuhta) (PP)	2-0
	2-1	29:40 – Fredrik Emwall

16 min
Penalties
22 min
19
Shots
29

== Scoring leaders ==
Pos	Player	Country	GP	G	A	Pts	+/−	PIM	POS
1	Andrei Taratukhin	Russia	3	2	2	4	+4	0	CE
2	Alexei Mikhnov	Russia	3	2	2	4	+4	4	LW
3	Miloslav Hořava	Czech Republic	3	2	2	4	+2	6	RW
4	Jukka Hentunen	Finland	3	1	3	4	+3	2	RW
5	Mika Hannula	Sweden	3	2	1	3	+3	0	RW

GP = Games played; G = Goals; A = Assists; Pts = Points; +/− = Plus/minus; PIM = Penalties in minutes; POS = Position
Source: swehockey

== Goaltending leaders ==
Pos	Player	Country	TOI	GA	GAA	Sv%	SO
1	Fredrik Norrena	Finland	145:00	4	1.66	93.75	0
2	Maxim Sokolov	Russia	125:01	6	2.88	90.91	0
3	Marek Pinc	Czech Republic	100:00	5	3.00	88.89	0
4	Stefan Liv	Sweden	118:49	5	2.52	86.49	0
5	Milan Hnilička	Czech Republic	80:00	8	6.00	82.61	0

TOI = Time on ice (minutes:seconds); SA = Shots against; GA = Goals against; GAA = Goals Against Average; Sv% = Save percentage; SO = Shutouts
Source: swehockey

== Tournament awards ==
The tournament directorate named the following players in the tournament 2005:

- Best goalkeeper: (Finland) Fredrik Norrena
- Best defenceman: (Sweden) Kenny Jönsson
- Best forward: (Russia) Andrei Taratukhin
