= 2005 Česká pojišťovna Cup =

2005 Česká Pojišťovna Cup
Tournament details
- Host countries: Czech Republic; Russia
- Cities: Liberec; Moscow
- Venues: 2 (in 2 host cities)
- Dates: 1-4 September 2005
- Teams: 4

Final positions
- Champions: Sweden (2nd title)
- Runners-up: Russia
- Third place: Czech Republic
- Fourth place: Finland

Tournament statistics
- Games played: 6
- Goals scored: 24 (4 per game)
- Attendance: 19,932 (3,322 per game)
- Scoring leader(s): (Russia) Andrei Taratukhin (Czech Republic) Jan Marek (3 points)

The 2005 Česká Pojišťovna Cup was played between 1 and 4 September 2005. The Czech Republic, Finland, Sweden and Russia played a round-robin for a total of three games per team and six games in total. Five of the matches were played in Tipsport Arena in Liberec, Czech Republic, and one match in Yubileyny Sports Palace in Saint Petersburg, Russia. The tournament was won by Russia. The tournament was part of 2005–06 Euro Hockey Tour.

== Standings ==
Pos	Team	Pld	W	OTW	OTL	L	GF	GA	GD	Pts
1	Sweden	3	3	0	0	0	9	4	+5	9
2	Russia	2	2	0	0	0	7	4	+3	6
3	Czech Republic	1	0	1	0	0	6	8	−2	2
4	Finland	1	0	0	1	0	2	8	−6	1

Source: swehockey

== Games ==
All times are local. Liberec – (Central European Summer Time – UTC+1) Linköping – (Eastern European Summer Time – UTC+2)

1 September 2005; 18:00	Czech Republic	2-1 GWS (1-1, 0-0, 0-0) (OT: 0–0) (SO: 1–0)	Finland	Tipsport Arena, Liberec; Attendance: 3,950

Game reference
Milan Hnilička	Goalies	Niklas Bäckström
02:31 – Jan Marek (Jan Hlaváč, Jaroslav Hlinka) / 1-0; / 1-1 / 14:49 – Tomek Valtonen (Sami Lepistö, Pasi Saarela)
Burger; Bednář (miss); Hlaváč (miss); Burger	Shootout	Kontiola; (miss) Viuhkola; (miss) Kontiola; (miss) Pärssinen
10 min	Penalties	10 min
38	Shots	23

1 September 2005; 19:00	Russia	1-2 (1-0, 0-1, 0-1)	Sweden	Yubileyny Sports Palace, Moscow; Attendance: 6,803

Game reference

Sergei Zvyagin
Goalies
Johan Holmqvist

07:57 – Maxim Sushinsky (Andrei Taratukhin)	1-0
	1-1	28:36 – Jonas Nordquist (David Petrasek, Christian Berglund)
	1-2	59:28 – Mika Hannula (Johan Davidsson)

39 min
Penalties
28 min
35
Shots
37

3 September 2005; 14:00	Finland	1-4 (0-0, 0-2, 1-2)	Russia	Tipsport Arena, Liberec; Attendance: 1,090

Game reference

Tero Leinonen
Goalies
Alexander Yeryomenko

	0-1	22:04 – Vitaly Atyushov (Denis Kulyash, Maxim Sushinsky) (PP)
	0-2	32:29 – Andrei Taratukhin (Maxim Sushinsky, Alexander Kharitonov) (PP)
	0-3	47:32 – Denis Kulyash (Vitaly Atyushov) (PP)
	0-4	52:00 – Andrei Taratukhin
53:06 – Mikko Lehtonen (Jari Viuhkola, Jyrki Louhi)	1-4

8 min
Penalties
14 min
41
Shots
28

3 September 2005; 18:00	Czech Republic	3-5 (0-2, 2-3, 1-0)	Sweden	Tipsport Arena, Liberec; Attendance: 3,583

Game reference

Dušan Salfický
Goalies
Daniel Henriksson

	0-1	03:55 – Johan Davidsson (Mika Hannula) (PP)
	0-2	16:19 – Jimmie Ölvestad (Jonas Nordquist, Kristofer Ottosson)
	0-3	25:09 – Jesper Mattsson (Christian Berglund)
31:13 – Jaroslav Bednář (Pavel Rosa)	1-3
	1-4	35:11 – Kristofer Ottosson (Jimmie Ölvestad) (SHG)
35:46 – Jan Marek (Jaroslav Hlinka, Jan Hlaváč) (PP)	2-4
	2-5	38:43 – Joel Lundqvist (Johnny Oduya, Johan Davidsson) (SHG)
44:19 – Jiří Burger (Jan Marek, Ondřej Veselý)	3-5

14 min
Penalties
32 min
28
Shots
34

4 September 2005; 14:00	Sweden	2-0 (0-0, 1-0, 1-0)	Finland	Tipsport Arena, Liberec; Attendance: 1,180

Game reference
Johan Holmqvist	Goalies	Niklas Bäckström
30:40 – Joel Lundqvist (Johnny Oduya, Lars Jonsson) (SHG) / 1-0; 57:06 – Per Ledin (Christian Berglund, David Petrasek) (PP) / 2-0
18 min	Penalties	34 min
25	Shots	20

4 September 2005; 18:00	Czech Republic	1-2 (0-0, 1-0, 0-2)	Russia	Tipsport Arena, Liberec; Attendance: 3,326

Game reference
Milan Hnilička	Goalies	Alexander Fomichev
25:37 – Václav Skuhravý (Karel Rachůnek, Ondřej Veselý) / Goals / 57:02 – Alexander Kharitonov (Igor Mirnov); 58:27 – Anton Kuryanov
14 min	Penalties	12 min
28	Shots	27

== Scoring leaders ==
Pos	Player	Country	GP	G	A	Pts	+/−	PIM	POS
1	Andrei Taratukhin	Russia	3	2	1	3	+4	4	CE
2	Jan Marek	Czech Republic	3	2	1	3	+1	4	CE
3	Johan Davidsson	Sweden	3	1	2	3	+2	0	CE
4	Maxim Sushinsky	Russia	3	1	2	3	+0	2	LD
5	Christian Berglund	Sweden	3	0	3	3	+0	4	LW

GP = Games played; G = Goals; A = Assists; Pts = Points; +/− = Plus/minus; PIM = Penalties in minutes; POS = Position
Source: swehockey

== Goaltending leaders ==
Pos	Player	Country	TOI	GA	GAA	Sv%	SO
1	Johan Holmqvist	Sweden	120:00	1	0.50	98.33	1
2	Niklas Bäckström	Finland	124:23	4	1.93	93.65	0
3	Milan Hnilička	Czech Republic	148:16	4	1.62	93.55	0

TOI = Time on ice (minutes:seconds); SA = Shots against; GA = Goals against; GAA = Goals Against Average; Sv% = Save percentage; SO = Shutouts
Source: swehockey

== Tournament awards ==
The tournament directorate named the following players in the tournament 2005:

- Best goalkeeper: (Sweden) Johan Holmqvist
- Best defenceman: (Sweden) Johnny Oduya
- Best forward: (Russia) Maxim Sushinsky

Media All-Star Team:

- Goaltender: (Czech Republic) Milan Hnilička
- Defence: (Russia) Vitaly Atyushov, (Sweden) Johnny Oduya
- Forwards: (Sweden) Jimmie Ölvestad, (Czech Republic) Jiří Burger, (Russia) Maxim Sushinsky
