= 2009–10 Czech Extraliga season =

2009–10 Czech Extraliga
- League: Czech Extraliga
- Sport: Ice hockey
- Duration: September 2009 – April 2010
- Teams: 14
- TV partner: Czech Television

Regular season
- Presidential Cup: Plzeň 1929
- Top scorer: Roman Červenka (Slavia Prague)

Playoffs

Finals
- Champions: Pardubice
- Runners-up: Vítkovice

Czech Extraliga seasons
- ← 2008–09 2010–11 →

The 2009–10 Czech Extraliga season was the 17th season of the Czech Extraliga since its creation after the breakup of Czechoslovakia and the Czechoslovak First Ice Hockey League in 1993. In the regular season, Plzeň 1929 finished atop the league, Roman Červenka led the league in points and assists, and Petr Ton led the league in goals.

== Team overview ==
Location of the 2009–10 Czech Extraliga teams

Team	City	Arena	Head coach(es)	Captain
Bílí Tygři Liberec	Liberec	Tipsport Arena	Jiří Kalous	Petr Nedvěd
České Budějovice	České Budějovice	Budvar Arena	František Výborný	Ondřej Veselý
Karlovy Vary	Karlovy Vary	KV Arena	Josef Paleček	Václav Skuhravý
Kladno	Kladno	Zimní stadion	Zdeněk Müller	Pavel Patera
Kometa Brno	Brno	Hala Rondo	Vladimír Jeřábek	Kamil Brabenec
Litvínov	Litvínov	Ivan Hlinka Stadion	Jaroslav Hübl, Sr. Petr Rosol	Robert Reichel
Mladá Boleslav	Mladá Boleslav	Metrostav Aréna	Vladimír Čermák	Richard Král
Oceláři Třinec	Třinec	Werk Arena	Břetislav Kopřiva	Jan Peterek
Pardubice	Pardubice	ČEZ Arena	Václav Sýkora	Petr Koukal
Plzeň 1929	Plzeň	ČEZ Aréna	Marian Jelínek; Milan Razým	Martin Straka
Slavia Prague	Prague	O_{2} Arena	Vladimír Růžička	Josef Beránek
Sparta Prague	Prague	Tesla Arena	David Volek; Miloš Holaň	David Výborný
Vítkovice Steel	Ostrava	ČEZ Aréna	Alois Hadamczik	Jiří Burger
Zlín	Zlín	Zimní stadion Luďka Čajky	Zdeněk Venera	Jaroslav Balaštík

== Regular season ==
=== Standings ===
Regular season standings
Team	GP	W	OTW	OTL	L	GF	GA	P	Notes
Plzeň 1929 (Q)	52	29	6	7	10	162	128	106	Qualified to first round of playoffs
Zlín (Q)	52	25	9	3	15	154	129	96	Qualified to first round of playoffs
Pardubice (Q)	52	27	4	7	14	179	131	96	Qualified to first round of playoffs
Vítkovice Steel (Q)	52	21	9	7	15	161	136	88	Qualified to first round of playoffs
Sparta Prague (Q)	52	21	9	6	16	157	132	87	Qualified to first round of playoffs
Oceláři Třinec (Q)	52	20	8	7	17	153	148	83	Qualified to first round of playoffs
Slavia Prague (Q)	52	20	6	2	24	142	151	74	Qualified to preliminary round of playoffs
Bílí Tygři Liberec (Q)	52	21	2	5	24	141	151	72	Qualified to preliminary round of playoffs
České Budějovice (Q)	52	15	7	12	18	130	151	71	Qualified to preliminary round of playoffs
Litvínov (Q)	52	19	4	5	24	152	193	70	Qualified to preliminary round of playoffs
Karlovy Vary (RP) (O)	52	17	3	9	23	135	152	66	Entered into relegation round
Kometa Brno (RP) (O)	52	16	5	5	26	123	150	63	Entered into relegation round
Mladá Boleslav (RP) (R)	52	12	10	6	24	135	148	62	Entered into relegation round
Kladno (RP) (O)	52	15	4	5	28	133	157	58	Entered into relegation round

Key

(C) = Playoff champions; (Q) = Qualified to playoffs; (RP) = Relegation playoff; (O) = Relegation playoff winner; (R) = Relegated.

=== Season summary ===
The regular season consisted of 52 games for each team. Every team plays each of the other 13 teams four times, twice at home and twice on the road. Each game is worth three points in the standings. A game won in regulation nets the victor three points and the loser none. A game the ends in a tie at the end of regulation goes into overtime and, if necessary, a shootout. In an overtime or shootout game, the winner earns two points while the loser is awarded one point.

== Playoffs ==
=== Bracket ===
The playoff bracket is not a fixed bracket. Like the intraconference bracket in the NHL, the matchups are adjusted in each successive round in order to place the top-ranked team against the bottom-ranked team.

First round March 8–14
8	Liberec	3
9	České Budějovice	2
7	Slavia	3
10	Litvínov	2

Quarterfinals; March 16–29
1	Plzeň	2
8	Liberec	4
3	Pardubice	4
6	Třinec	1
4	Vítkovice	4
5	Sparta	3
2	Zlín	2
7	Slavia	4

Semifinals; April 1–9
8	Liberec	0
3	Pardubice	4
4	Vítkovice	4
7	Slavia	1

Finals; April 17–22
3	Pardubice	4
4	Vítkovice	0

=== Playoff summary ===
At the end of the regular season, the seventh through tenth-placed teams played in a best-of-five, preliminary playoff round. In the preliminary round Bílí Tygři Liberec defeated České Budějovice and Slavia Prague defeated Litvínov, both series going the 5-game distance. Liberec was then paired against Plzeň, and Slavia were paired against Zlín. Other first round matchups included Vítkovice–Sparta and Pardubice–Třinec.

The quarterfinal round saw two major upsets as the preliminary round winners knocked off the two highest-seeded teams from the regular season. Eighth-seeded Liberec knocked off top seed Plzeň in six games, 4–2, capped off by a 7–2 victory in game 6. The other first round upset saw Slavia knock off Zlín, also in six games and in front of their home crowd. Third-seeded Pardubice, after dropping the first game at home, ran off four straight victories to defeat Třinec 4–1. The only first round series to go the seven-game distance saw Vitkovice win at home to hold off Sparta.

In the semifinal round, Pardubice, the highest-remaining seed, were placed against Liberec, and Vitkovice were paired against Slavia.

== Relegation ==
=== Play-out round ===
The bottom four teams from the regular season – Karlovy Vary, Kometa Brno, Mladá Boleslav, Kladno – were placed in a "play-out" relegation group. The group is structured like a mini-season in which each of the four teams played each of the other four times, twice at home and twice on the road, the same as the regular season format. The results from the regular season standings are retained, and the additional relegation round match results are added to the table in order to determine which team is relegated to the Czech First League. Mladá Boleslav won only two of their twelve relegation round games, one in regulation and one in a shootout, and faced the 1. národní hokejová liga winner KLH Chomutov in best-of-seven series.

Relegation round standings
Team	GP	W	OTW	OTL	L	GF	GA	P
Kometa Brno (O)	64	22	8	6	28	159	178	88
Kladno (O)	64	22	5	7	30	169	186	83
Karlovy Vary (O)	64	20	5	11	28	160	81	81
Mladá Boleslav (RP)	64	13	11	8	32	158	184	69

Key

(C) = Playoff champions; (Q) = Qualified to playoffs; (RP) = Relegation playoff; (O) = Relegation playoff winner; (R) = Relegated.

=== Play-off round ===
Mladá Boleslav were paired against KLH Chomutov, playoff winners of the 2009-10 playoffs of the 1. národní hokejová liga, with the winner of the best of seven series earning a place in the 2010–11 Czech Extraliga season. Mladá Boleslav won the series 4–1 and retained their position in the Extraliga.

Date	Home	Score	Away
April 10	Mladá Boleslav	5 – 3	Chomutov
April 11	Mladá Boleslav	1 – 2	Chomutov
April 14	Chomutov	2 – 4	Mladá Boleslav
April 15	Chomutov	3 – 4	Mladá Boleslav
April 18	Mladá Boleslav	5 – 1	Chomutov
