= 1997 Pragobanka Cup =

Tournament details
- Host country: Czech Republic
- City: Zlín
- Venue: 1 (in 1 host city)
- Dates: 28–31 August 1997
- Teams: 4

Final positions
- Champions: Czech Republic (3rd title)
- Runners-up: Finland
- Third place: Russia
- Fourth place: Sweden

Tournament statistics
- Games played: 6
- Goals scored: 40 (6.67 per game)
- Attendance: 27,176 (4,529 per game)
- Scoring leader(s): (Czech Republic) Petr Ton (Czech Republic) Josef Beránek (6 points)

The 1997 Pragobanka Cup was played between 28 and 31 August 1997. The Czech Republic, Finland, Sweden and Russia played a round-robin for a total of three games per team and six games in total. All games were played in Zimní stadion Luďka Čajky in Zlín, Czech Republic. The tournament was won by Czech Republic. The tournament was part of 1996–97 Euro Hockey Tour.

== Standings ==
Pos	Team	Pld	W	D	L	GF	GA	GD	Pts
1	Czech Republic	3	3	0	0	16	5	+11	9
2	Finland	3	1	1	1	13	9	+4	4
3	Russia	3	1	1	1	6	9	−3	4
4	Russia	3	1	1	1	6	9	−3	4

Source: swehockey

== Games ==
All times are local. Zlín – (Central European Summer Time – UTC+1)

28 August 1997; 16:00	Sweden	1-8 (1-4, 0-3, 0-1)	Finland	Zimní stadion Luďka Čajky, Zlín; Attendance: 1,100

Game reference

Mikael Sandberg
Goalies
Miikka Kiprusoff
Referee:
(Czech Republic) Petr Bolina
Linesmen:
(Czech Republic) Brázdil
(Czech Republic) Pavel Halas

Juhlin (Karlsson) – 07:00	1-0
	1-1	08:00 – Pirjetä
	1-2	10:0 – Niemi (Jantunen)
	1-3	12:00 – Riihijärvi (Ojanen)
	1-4	17:00 – Tarvainen (Hassinen)
	1-5	23:00 – Rintanen
	1-6	24:00 – Eloranta (Tarvainen)
	1-7	34:00 – Peltonen (Lydman)
	1-8	54:00 – Riihijärvi (Ojanen)

14 min
Penalties
14 min

28 August 1997; 20:00	Czech Republic	5-0 (3-0, 2-0, 0-0)	Russia	Zimní stadion Luďka Čajky, Zlín; Attendance: 4,699

Game reference

Roman Čechmánek
Goalies
Sergei Fadeyev Yegor Podomatsky
Referee:
(Finland) Lapeus
Linesman:
(Czech Republic) Stanislav Barvíř

Bělohlav (Beránek) – 02:00	1-0
Zelenka (Patera) – 08:00	2-0
Kučera (Beránek) – 17:00	3-0
Ton (Štěpánek) – 27:00	4-0
Vykoukal (Beránek, Kratěna) – 38:00	5-0

12 min
Penalties
6 min

29 August 1997; 18:00	Finland	2-2 (0-1, 1-1, 1-0)	Russia	Zimní stadion Luďka Čajky, Zlín; Attendance: 1,608

Game reference

Ari Sulander
Goalies
Yegor Podomatsky
Referee:
(Poland) Karas
Linesmen:
(Czech Republic) Český
(Czech Republic) Miloš Bádal

Morozov (Prokopiev) – 37:00	1-0
Morozov – 42:00	2-0
	2-1	14:00 – Nurminen (Peltonen)
	2-2	23:00 – Nurminen (Nummelin)

6 min
Penalties
4 min

30 August 1997; 18:00	Sweden	2-5 (0-2, 2-2, 0-1)	Czech Republic	Zimní stadion Luďka Čajky, Zlín; Attendance: 6,642

Game reference

Petter Rönnquist
Goalies
Roman Cechmánek

	0-1	05:00 – Výborný (Patera)
	0-2	09:00 – Beránek (Belohlav)
	0-3	21:00 – Beránek (Vykoukal)
	0-4	28:00 – Kratena (Belohlav)
Juhlin (Bergqvist) – 33:00	1-4
Johnsson (Kjellberg) – 34:00	2-4
	2-5	55:00 – Ton (Meluzín)

16 min
Penalties
8 min

31 August 1997; 13:30	Russia	4-2 (1-0, 0-2, 3-0)	Sweden	Zimní stadion Luďka Čajky, Zlín; Attendance: 5,877

Game reference

Yegor Podomatsky
Goalies
Petter Rönnquist

Morozov – 13:00	1-0
	1-1	26:00 – Huusko
	1-2	39:00 – Karlsson
Prokopiev – 50:00	2-2
Morozov (Gorshkov) – 54:00	3-2
Morozov (Yerofeyev) – 60:00	4-2

16 min
Penalties
18 min

31 August 1997; 17:30	Czech Republic	6-3 (2-1, 3-1, 1-1)	Finland	Zimní stadion Luďka Čajky, Zlín; Attendance: 7,250

Game reference
Milan Hnilicka	Goalies	Miikka Kiprusoff
Vlasák (Ujčík) – 05:00; Meluzín (Ton) – 16:00; Meluzín (Ton) – 26:00; Meluzin (Procházka) – 30:00; Patera – 35:00; Ton (Vlasák) – 59:00 / Goals / 10:00 – Ojanen (Riihijärvi); 24:00 – Ojanen (Riihijärvi); 47:00 – Kiprusoff (Nummelin)
10 min	Penalties	8 min

== Scoring leaders ==
Pos	Player	Country	GP	G	A	Pts	+/−	PIM	POS
1	Petr Ton	Czech Republic	3	4	2	6	+4	0	F
2	Josef Beránek	Czech Republic	3	2	4	6	+7	8	F
3	Alexei Morozov	Russia	3	5	0	5	+5	0	F
4	Juha Riihijärvi	Finland	3	2	3	5	+2	0	F
5	Janne Ojanen	Finland	3	2	2	4	+3	2	F

GP = Games played; G = Goals; A = Assists; Pts = Points; +/− = Plus/minus; PIM = Penalties in minutes; POS = Position
Source: quanthockey

== Goaltending leaders ==
Pos	Player	Country	TOI	GA	GAA	Sv%	SO
1	Roman Čechmánek	Czech Republic	120:00	X	X.XX	95.31	1
2	Yegor Podomatsky	Russia	140:00	X	X.XX	93.75	0
3	Miikka Kiprusoff	Finland	60:00	X	X.XX	93.10	0
4	Milan Hnilička	Czech Republic	60:00	X	X.XX	91.30	0
5	Ari Sulander	Finland	120:00	X	X.XX	88.89	0
6	Mikael Sandberg	Sweden	76:00	X	X.XX	86.00	0
7	Petter Rönnquist	Sweden	104:00	X	X.XX	81.63	0
8	Sergei Fadeyev	Russia	40:00	X	X.XX	70.59	0

TOI = Time on ice (minutes:seconds); SA = Shots against; GA = Goals against; GAA = Goals Against Average; Sv% = Save percentage; SO = Shutouts
Source: hokej

== Tournament awards ==
The tournament directorate named the following players in the tournament 1997:

- Best goalkeeper: (Czech Republic) Roman Čechmánek
- Best defenceman: (Finland) Petteri Nummelin
- Best forward: (Czech Republic) Pavel Patera
