= 1999 Česká pojišťovna Cup =

1999 Česká Pojišťovna Cup
Tournament details
- Host country: Czech Republic
- City: Zlín
- Venue: 1 (in 1 host city)
- Dates: 2–5 September 1999
- Teams: 4

Final positions
- Champions: Czech Republic (4th title)
- Runners-up: Finland
- Third place: Sweden
- Fourth place: Russia

Tournament statistics
- Games played: 6
- Goals scored: 33 (5.5 per game)
- Attendance: 11,528 (1,921 per game)
- Scoring leader(s): (Sweden) Magnus Wernblom (Finland) Markku Hurme (4 points)

The 1999 Česká Pojišťovna Cup was played between 2 and 5 September 1999. The Czech Republic, Finland, Sweden and Russia played a round-robin for a total of three games per team and six games in total. All games were played in Zimní stadion Luďka Čajky in Zlín, Czech Republic. The tournament was won by the Czech Republic. The tournament was part of 1999–2000 Euro Hockey Tour.

== Standings ==
Pos	Team	Pld	W	D	L	GF	GA	GD	Pts
1	Czech Republic	3	3	0	0	10	3	+7	9
2	Finland	3	1	1	1	6	8	−2	4
3	Sweden	3	1	0	2	10	12	−2	3
4	Russia	3	0	1	2	7	10	−3	1

Source: swehockey

== Games ==
All times are local. Zlín – (Central European Time – UTC+1)

2 September 1999; 16:00	Russia	2-2 (1-1, 0-1, 1-0)	Finland	Zimní stadion Luďka Čajky, Zlín; Attendance: 1,600

Game reference
Yegor Podomatsky	Goalies	Vesa Toskala	Referee: (Czech Republic) Vladimír Šindler; Linesmen: (Czech Republic) Miloš Bádal (Czech Republic) Pouzar
Bets (Petrenko) – 08:00 / 1-0			Referee: (Czech Republic) Vladimír Šindler; Linesmen: (Czech Republic) Miloš Bádal (Czech Republic) Pouzar
10 min	Penalties	12 min	Referee: (Czech Republic) Vladimír Šindler; Linesmen: (Czech Republic) Miloš Bádal (Czech Republic) Pouzar

2 September 1999; 20:00	Czech Republic	4-2 (2-0, 0-0, 2-2)	Sweden	Zimní stadion Luďka Čajky, Zlín

Game reference

Roman Čechmánek
Goalies
Johan Holmqvist

Dopita (Ujčík) – 12:00	1-0
Vlasák (Šimíček) – 17:00	2-0
Čajánek (Kucharčík, Benýšek) – 50:00	3-0
	3-1	56:00 – Esbjörs (Artursson)
	3-2	57:00 – Molin (D.Sedin, H.Sedin)
Šimíček (Tenkrát) – 60:00	4-2

10 min
Penalties
10 min

4 September 1999; 14:00	Finland	4-3 (0-1, 1-1, 3-1)	Sweden	Zimní stadion Luďka Čajky, Zlín; Attendance: 1,500

Game reference

Kimmo Kapanen
Goalies
Andreas Hadelöv

	0-1	12:00 – Johnson (Wernblom)
Kauppila – 24:00	1-1
	1-2	34:00 – Bremberg
Nummelin (Kallio, Hurme) – 47:00	2-2
Tarvainen – 48:00	3-2
	3-3	52:00 – Wernblom (Nord)
Sihvonen (Hurme) – 54:00	4-3

18 min
Penalties
18 min

4 September 1999; 17:30	Russia	1-3 (1-2, 0-1, 0-0)	Czech Republic	Zimní stadion Luďka Čajky, Zlín

Game reference

Yegor Podomatsky
Goalies
Martin Prusek

	0-1	05:00 – Král
Arkhipov (Kudashov) – 15:00	1-1
	1-2	17:00 – Čaloun (Výborný, Reichel)
	1-3	27:00 – Kucharčík (Čajánek)

6 min
Penalties
8 min

5 September 1999; 13:30	Sweden	5-4 (1-3, 2-1, 2-0)	Russia	Zimní stadion Luďka Čajky, Zlín; Attendance: 1,528

Game reference

Johan Holmqvist
Goalies
Yegor Podomatsky

	0-1	05:00 – Bets (Markov)
	0-2	10:00 – Kartsev (Kharitonov, Orekhovsky)
Ström – 12:00	1-2
	1-3	16:00 – Arkhipov (Dobryshkin, Markov)
Wernblom – 21:00	2-3
Falk – 35:00	3-3
	3-4	30:00 – Kharitonov (Kuvaldin)
Johnson – 42:00	4-4
Wernblom (Bremberg) – 50:00	5-4

12 min
Penalties
6 min

5 September 1999; 17:30	Czech Republic	3-0 (1-0, 0-0, 2-0)	Finland	Zimní stadion Luďka Čajky, Zlín; Attendance: 6,900

Game reference

Roman Čechmánek
Goalies
Vesa Toskala

Reichel (Výborný, Vykoukal) – 12:00	1-0
Čaloun (Reichel, Vykoukal) – 56:00	2-0
Ujčík – 59:00	3-0

14 min
Penalties
16 min

== Scoring leaders ==
Pos	Player	Country	GP	G	A	Pts	+/−	PIM	POS
1	Magnus Wernblom	Sweden	3	3	1	4	+5	4	F
2	Markku Hurme	Finland	3	1	3	4	+1	2	F
3	Jonas Johnsson	Sweden	3	2	1	3	+5	0	F
4	Denis Arkhipov	Russia	3	2	0	2	0	2	F
5	Maxim Bets	Russia	3	2	0	2	0	0	D

GP = Games played; G = Goals; A = Assists; Pts = Points; +/− = Plus/minus; PIM = Penalties in minutes; POS = Position
Source: quanthockey

== Tournament awards ==
The tournament directorate named the following players in the tournament 1999:

- Best goalkeeper: (Czech Republic) Roman Čechmánek
- Best defenceman: (Finland) Petteri Nummelin
- Best forward: (Russia) David Výborný

Media All-Star Team:

- Goaltender: (Czech Republic) Roman Čechmánek
- Defence: (Finland) Petteri Nummelin, (Czech Republic) František Kučera
- Forwards: (Sweden) Magnus Wernblom, (Czech Republic) Roman Šimícek, (Russia) Petr Čajánek
