= Peterek =

Peterek is a surname. Notable people with this surname include:

- Jan Peterek (born 1971), Czech ice hockey player
- Jeff Peterek (1963–2023), American baseball player
- Teodor Peterek (1910–1969), Polish footballer
