= Cermak =

Cermak may refer to:

== Chicago CTA stations ==
- 54th/Cermak (CTA station), a Chicago Transit Authority Pink Line station
- Cermak–Chinatown (CTA station), a Chicago Transit Authority Red Line station
- Cermak–McCormick Place (CTA station), a Chicago Transit Authority Green Line station

== Other ==
- Anton Cermak, 34th mayor of Chicago
- Cermak Road, an east–west road in Chicago's Near South Side
- Čermák (surname)
