= Louhi (disambiguation) =

Louhi is a queen in Finnish mythology and the mythology of Lapland.

Louhi may also refer to

- Finnish minelayer Louhi, built in 1916
- Finnish pollution control vessel Louhi, built in 2011
- Loukhi (Finnish and Karelian: Louhi), an urban locality in the Loukhsky District, Republic of Karelia, Russia
- Louhi District, Karelia, Russia
- Louhi, a fictional character in the video game Final Fantasy: The 4 Heroes of Light
- 3897 Louhi, a minor planet

== People with the surname ==
- Juha Louhi, formerly Juha Turunen (born 1964), Finnish lawyer, politician and kidnapper
- Jyrki Louhi, Finnish professional ice hockey forward
