= Leokadia Makarska-Čermák =

Leokadia Makarska-Čermák or Lily Čermák (Czech: Leokadia Čermáková) is a Polish painter and designer. She is known in the United States for painting US Senator Charles Schumer, and New York City Mayors Rudy Giuliani and Michael Bloomberg.

== Early life and education ==
Leokadia Makarska was born in Polanica-Zdrój, Poland. She received a merit-based full scholarship from the Ministry of Culture that allowed her to study the five-year program in interior design and wood technologies at the Technical University in Zvolen, Czechoslovakia (today in Slovakia). After graduation, Leokadia married Jiří Čermák and moved to Ostrov (Karlovy Vary District). She worked in Karlovy Vary, first as an interior and furniture designer, and later as a teacher at a technical high school.

Leokadia Makarska-Čermák (as Leokadia Čermáková) received her Bachelor of Arts with Cum Laude honors from the Bernard M. Baruch College of the City University of New York in the United States, her master's degree from the Tomáš G. Masaryk College of the Czech Technical University in Prague, and her master's degree in Architecture of Interiors and Furniture design from Technical University in Zvolen in former Czechoslovakia.

== Career beginnings ==
Since the early 1980s, Makarska-Čermák belonged to a local fine art club and exhibited her art in Ostrov and Karlovy Vary. However, in 1995 she decided to concentrate on her art work full-time and left her teaching position.

It was in these years that Makarska-Čermák studied painting and drawing under the direction of professor Hana in Karlovy Vary (Czech Republic), professors Francesco Brunetti, Demetrio Casile, and Nino Noce in Italy, and Jacek M. Rybczynski in Germany.

In October 1997, Makarska-Čermák had her first exhibit in the United States. It was hosted by the Polish Consulate General in New York.

Since 1998, Makarska-Čermák has been working at the Grand Prospect Hall as an in-house artist and curator, restoring paintings and interiors.

== Honors ==
Makarska-Čermák's list of honors includes presentation of portraits to such public figures as NYC Mayors Rudy Giuliani and Michael Bloomberg, U.S. Senator Chuck Schumer, and Founder and executive director of CIAO Mary C. Sansone.

== Critical acclaim ==
In 1995, Professor Jacek Maria Rybczynski wrote a critical analysis on Leokadia Makarska-Čermák's unique art:

"The paintings and drawings, to which the artist devotes her skill, are rich in metaphorical meaning and bear testimony to a higher sensitivity. Makarska-Cermak’s self-avowed fascination with nature’s beauty is coated with a layer of symbolism: the flower as the mystical center conveys mystery and discloses at once a perplexing enigma and the logic of events…for the flower alludes to the passage of time, the cycle of birth and demise.

Makarska-Cermak's paintings depicting the world of nature have been noted for inviting individual interpretation and experience.

On October 27, 1998, Elinor Stecker-Orel, Editor to The New York Times wrote about Leokadia Makarska-Cermak's artwork:

"The viewer is immediately struck by the power of [Leokadia Makarska-Čermák's] work, power that is manifested in her bold colors and forceful brushstrokes. Remarkably, Makarska-Cermak is able to integrate this approach with subjects that ordinarily would be rendered with a more delicate hand. The result is work that is both emotional and sensitive.

The United States certainly is the beneficiary in having this talented artist on our shores."

On November 12, 1998, Rafal Olbinski, a painter and faculty member at the School of Visual Arts, wrote in regards to Leokadia Makarska-Čermák that she "stands out for her consistency, focus, and thoughtful approach to her work." The review notes that in her portraits, she demonstrates a sensitivity to her subjects, capturing both character and presence, and that in both portraiture and floral compositions, she shows technical skill and an artistic perspective. Olbinski concludes that her "dedication, discipline, and productivity are reflected throughout her body of work, which demonstrates a broad range of artistic abilities."

== Media coverage ==
- Leokadia Makarska-Čermák's work has been featured in some newspaper and magazine articles as well as in radio and television programs. Below is a list of media, the respective language, date, and name or article or program.
- In September 2011, Leokadia's painting the Golden Angels over Lower Manhattan received coverage by New York's Daily News (New York), Nowy Dziennik, and US Polsat TV (WNYE). She also presented her painting and her 9/11 story at the Sanctuary Still remembrance event held at the St. Ann and the Holy Trinity Church on September 11, 2011.
- Print of one of Leokadia's paintings auctioned for 6,100 PLN (2,000 USD), which was the second highest sum at the 3rd Annual Charitable Ball of Klodzko County's Leaders on February 11, 2012.

=== Czech ===
Karlovarske Noviny (Czech Newspaper) “Malirka z Polska bude vystavovat sve obrazy v Americe,” Karlovarske Noviny, Karlovy Vary, the Czech Republic, June 14, 1997.

=== English ===
The Post Eagle (Polish-American Newspaper) March 2011 Article, European Artist Presents Portrait to New York City Mayor, The Post Eagle, 11-2009. Reich, David (1999). "A Profile of the Artist: Leokadia Makarska-Cermak". The Post Eagle Reich, David (1999-06-23). "Polish Artisan Helping Restore Brooklyn Landmark". The Post Eagle., The Art Business News (American magazine)Art Business News, Picture Gallery, Portrait of NYC Mayor Giuliani, February 1999. Art Business News, March 2009, Ralph J. Sansone Foundation

=== French ===
Art Passion (French Magazine) Art Passion Magazine, December 2008.

=== Polish ===
Radio Zet (Polish Radio), TVP Wroclaw (Polish television) 1)Program "Weekend Z", 2)Program "Fakty", US Polsat-WNYE (Polish-American television) *Program "Polish News", Nowy Dziennik (Polish-American newspaper)

Chronicle of New York, Bloomberg in the Eyes of a Polish Artist, The Polish Daily News, New York, 2009-11-15.

Słabisz, Aleksandra, "From Poland, through Czechia, to New York," The Polish Daily News, New York, 2011-05-16.
