= Husqvarna Garden =

Indoor ice rink in Jönköping, Sweden

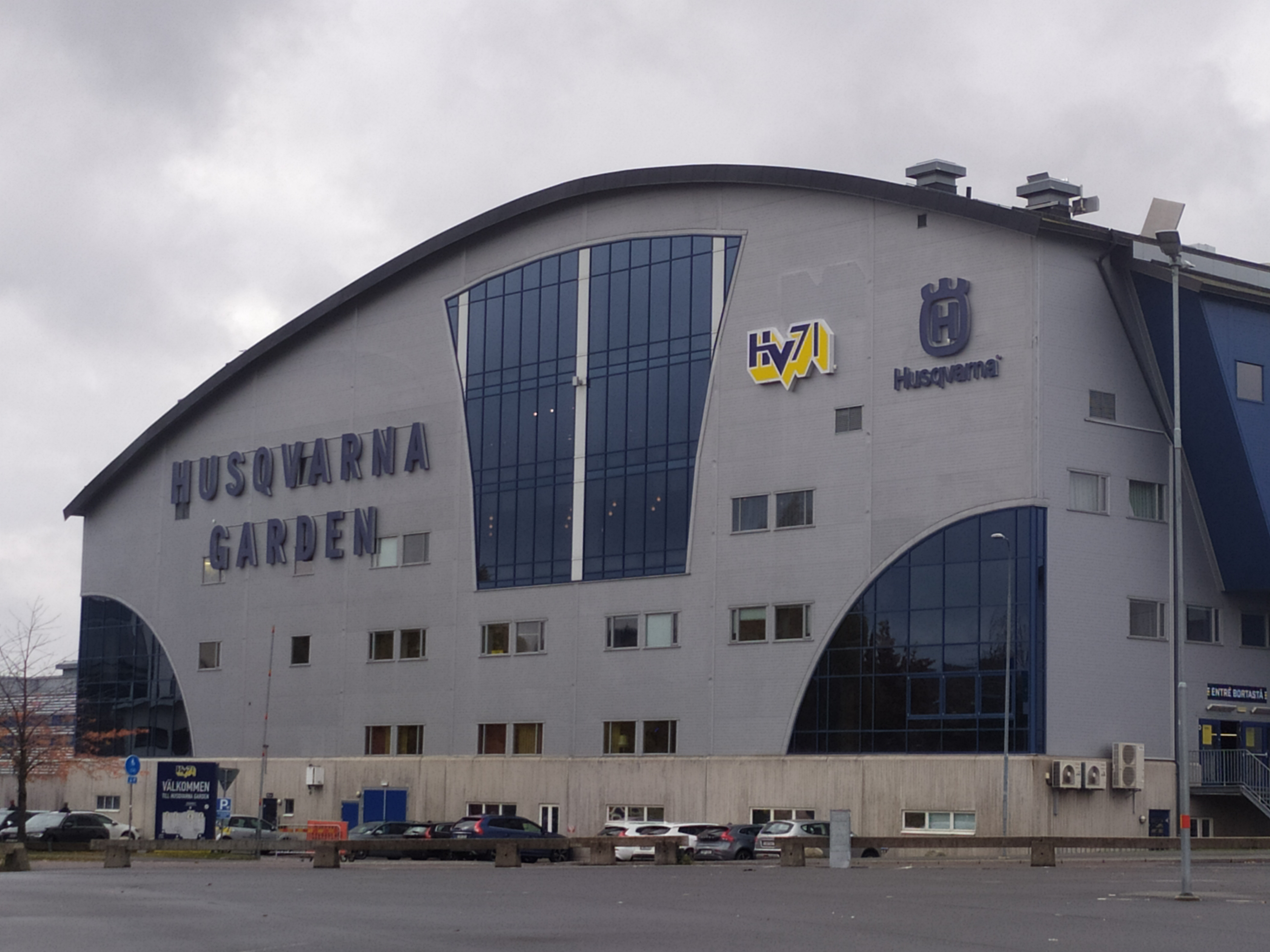
- Husqvarna Garden in October 2020
- Interactive map of Husqvarna Garden
- Former names: Kinnarps Arena (2000–2020)
- Location: 554 54 Jönköping, Sweden
- Coordinates: 57°47′13″N 14°13′57″E
- Owner: HV71 Fastighets AB
- Operator: HV71
- Capacity: Ice hockey: 7,000 (of which 1,100 standing)
- Field size: Ice hockey rink: 30 x 60 meters

Construction
- Groundbreaking: 17 September 1999
- Opened: 26 September 2000 (first ice hockey game); 21 October 2000
- Expanded: 2004
- Cost: SEK 135 million EUR € 15 million
- Architect: Flensborns arkitektkontor
- Main contractor: Skanska

Tenant
- HV71 (SHL)

The Husqvarna Garden, formerly Kinnarps Arena, is an indoor arena, primarily an ice hockey venue, in Jönköping, Sweden.

== History ==
The arena, which is located in the Rosenlund district of Jönköping, was built between September 1999 and September 2000. It was literally built around and on top of the old arena Rosenlundshallen while HV71 was still playing their regular season games.

Kinnarps Arena was designed by Flensborns arkitektkontor and Skanska as contractor, with Kinnarps AB financing the project. Future proprietor and owner of the arena is HV71 Fastighets AB, a subsidiary to HV71.

HV71 played its first Swedish Elite League game inside the arena on 26 September 2000, defeating Luleå HF, 6–4. The official inauguration occurred on 21 October the same year.

To improve HV71's youth programme a training facility connected to Kinnarps Arena was built and stood ready for use in May 2001. In December 2003 the decision to expand the arena for season 2004–05 with another 1,000 seats, a restaurant, a sports bar, a café, a sky bar, new conference rooms and boxes, was made.

In the pre-season of 2007–08 HV71 invested in a new LED scoreboard, measuring 6.2 by 10.5 feet, capable of a display surpassing any LED scoreboards currently installed in Sweden. The scoreboard is a Daktronics Prostar Video 10 mm indoor display and resembles the boards used in General Motors Place and Enterprise Center in NHL, and in Palais Omnisports de Paris-Bercy in France.

In August 2020, the arena was renamed from Kinnarps Arena to Husqvarna Garden.

== Events hosted ==
=== Sport events ===
- 2000 Karjala Tournament
- 2002 European Handball Championship
- 2002 Ice Hockey World Championship
- 2004 Team Handball Men's World Cup
- 2005 Karjala Tournament
- 2011 World Men's Handball Championship
- 2023 World Men's Handball Championship

=== Other events ===
- Semifinal 1 of Melodifestivalen 2007
- DreamHack Winter 2011
- Heat 5 & Final qualification of Melodifestivalen 2025

== See also ==
- List of indoor arenas in Sweden
- List of indoor arenas in Nordic countries
