= Nowy Dziennik =

Newspaper in Garfield, New Jersey

Nowy Dziennik Polish Weekly News

- A front page of Nowy Dziennik, 24 January 2015
- Type: Weekly newspaper
- Format: Compact/Broadsheet
- Owner(s): Outwater Media Group,
- Founder(s): Bolesław Wierzbiański
- Publisher: Zygmunt Rygiel
- Editor: Czesław Karkowski (until 2009); Jan Latus (until June 2011)
- Staff writers: 27
- Founded: February 27, 1971
- Language: Polish
- Headquarters: 10 Schindler Rd. Clark, NJ 07066United States
- Circulation: 15,000
- Price: $1.75
- ISSN: 1064-8402
- Website: www.dziennik.com

Nowy Dziennik (pronounced [ˈnɔvɨ ˈdʑɛɲɲik], in Polish: The New Daily, in reference to New York), is a Polish-language newspaper, formerly a daily with the English subtitle Polish Daily News, and now a weekly subtitled POLISH WEEKLY, published in New York City once a week, by Outwater Media Group, based in Garfield, New Jersey (until June 2011 by Bicentennial Publishing).

== History ==
Nowy Dziennik was founded in 1971 by Bolesław Wierzbiański (1913 – 2003), the journalist and first editor-in-chief. Over time, the paper has developed into the biggest and most respectable Polish daily in the United States. It is edited for the Polish diaspora. The first issue was released on February 27, 1971. Among the founders were Bolesław Wierzbiański, Rev. Edward Majewski from Lyndhurst, Bolesław Laszewski from New York, Rev. Franciszek Palecki from Philadelphia, Marian Święcicki from Dunellen, Rev. Michał Zembrzuski from Doylestown, and Edward Luka from Garfield. Nowy Dziennik covers all issues of interest to Polish emigration, including current events in Poland and abroad, investigative journalism, comprehensive reports, political commentary, and cultural events.

== Management ==
- Bolesław Wierzbiański (1971 – 2003)
- Barbara Wierzbiańska (2003 – 2008)
- Malina Stadnik (2008 – 2009)
- Tadeusz Kondratowicz (2009 – 2011)

== See also ==
- Media of New York City
