= Jakub Langhammer =

Czech ice hockey player

- Born: August 17, 1984 (age 41) Kladno, Czechoslovakia
- Height: 6 ft 2 in (188 cm)
- Weight: 212 lb (96 kg; 15 st 2 lb)
- Position: Left wing
- Shoots: Left
- Czech Extraliga team Former teams: Free agent HC Sparta Praha; HC České Budějovice; Mountfield HK; HC Slavia Praha; MHk 32 Liptovský Mikuláš
- National team: Czech Republic
- Playing career: 2005–present

Jakub Langhammer (born August 17, 1984) is a Czech professional ice hockey player. He is current a free agent having last played for HK Martin of the Slovak 1. Liga.

Before turning professional, Langhammer played for two seasons in the Western Hockey League of the Spokane Chiefs from 2002 to 2004. He went on to play 463 games in the Czech Extraliga for HC Sparta Praha, HC České Budějovice, Mountfield HK and HC Slavia Praha. He also played in the Tipsport Liga for MHk 32 Liptovský Mikuláš.
