= Miloslav Čermák =

Czech ice hockey player

- Born: 15 November 1986 (age 39) Havlíčkův Brod, Czechoslovakia
- Height: 6 ft 0 in (183 cm)
- Weight: 201 lb (91 kg; 14 st 5 lb)
- Position: Forward
- Shot: Left
- Played for: HC Slavia Praha; HC Dukla Jihlava
- NHL draft: Undrafted
- Playing career: 2006–2019

Miloslav Čermák (born 15 November 1986) is a former Czech professional ice hockey forward who played in the Czech Extraliga (ELH) for HC Slavia Praha and HC Dukla Jihlava.

Čermák played previously for HC Rebel Havlíčkův Brod.
