= Jaroslav Čermák =

Czech warrior (1929–2011)

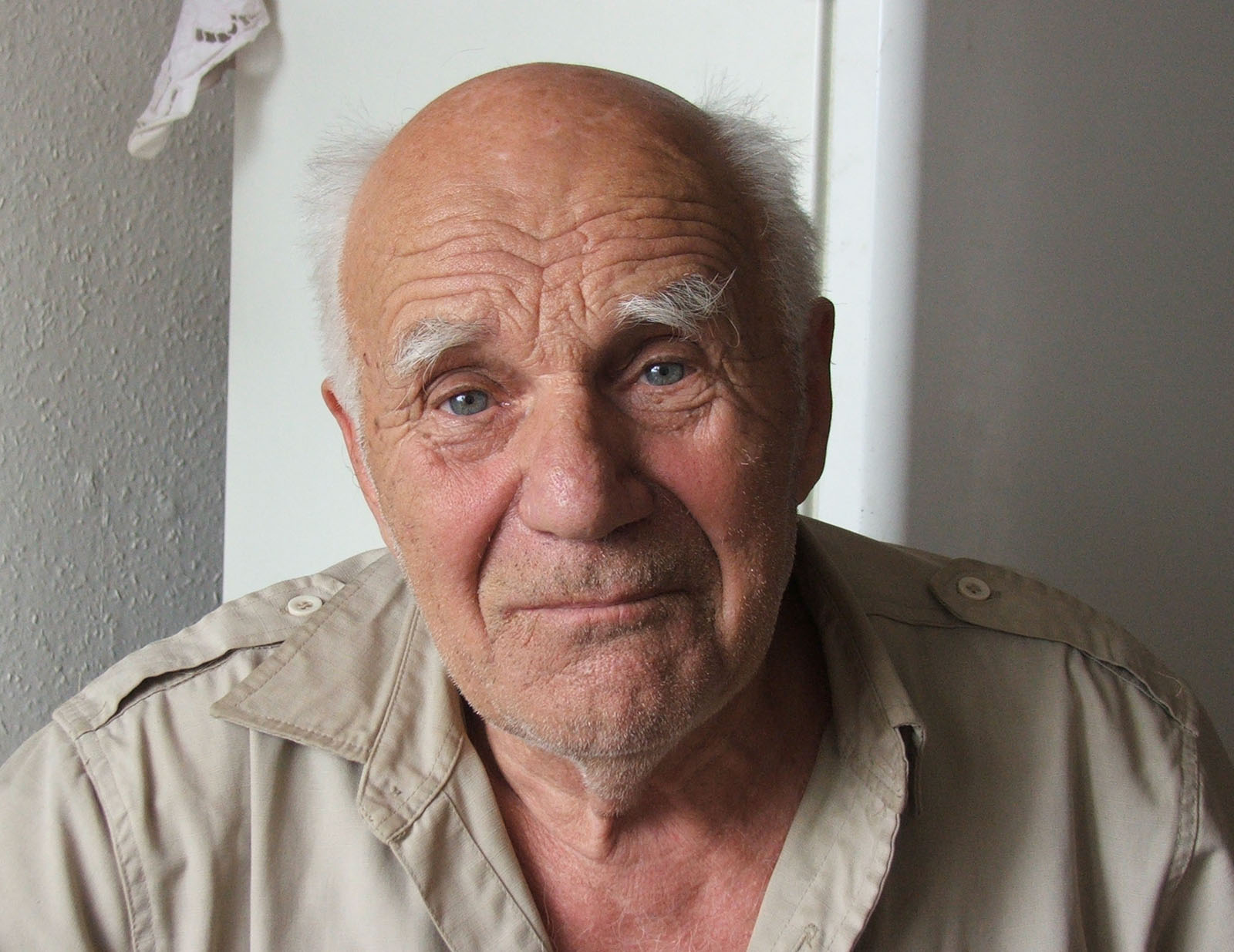
Jaroslav Čermák in 2006

Jaroslav Čermák (30 July 1929 – 10 March 2011) was a member of the French Resistance, of Czech origin. He was arrested by the Communist regime and later sentenced to death.

== Biography ==
As a boy he went to scout (1937), after the outbreak of war he was totally deployed in the Third Reich in a factory, where French prisoners of war were assigned. Here he became a link between them and members of the French Resistance movement and helped organize the escape of five French officers, with whom he and two friends also fled. He first fought against the Germans together with the French guerrillas in the Jura Mountains, then in the ranks of the regular French army, received an Allied soldier's passport and temporary citizenship. Sometime around this time, he contracted malaria.

After the end of the war, he returned to Czechoslovakia, where he worked for the Ministry of the Interior (his task was to find and convict collaborators). His sharp quarrels with communist-oriented superiors, who influenced the investigation and used it to their advantage, eventually led him to resign and leave definitively for France, where he decided to remain permanently after 1948.

After serving basic military service in the French army, he fought in the ranks of the Foreign Legion in Algeria and Indochina, among others, but was later discharged from the army because the warm weather aggravated his symptoms. He received a 20% pension and employment in the secret services. In 1953, he was assigned to the border area around Železná Ruda, where he was to keep records of people fleeing Czechoslovakia from communism.

Shortly afterwards, he requested a visit from his parents in Czechoslovakia, but he was denied that he no longer had Czechoslovak citizenship and his stay was undesirable.

In 1954, StB agents abducted him from Germany to Czechoslovakia. After cruel torture, despite French protests, he was sentenced to death for alleged high treason, which was changed to 18 years in prison after the French protests. He was imprisoned in the Jáchymov uranium mines and later in Leopoldov. During his imprisonment, he was denied treatment and was forced to work during malaria attacks. He was released conditionally in 1964 and in 1969 he emigrated to the then GDR. In the second half of the 1970s, he returned to the former Czechoslovakia and worked as a skilled worker.

He was twice married, with a daughter Dagmar from his first marriage, a daughter Helena and a son Jan from the second.

He died on March 10, 2011, during a spa stay in Poděbrady.
