= Roman Meluzín =

Czech ice hockey player

- Born: June 17, 1972 (age 52); Blansko, Czechoslovakia
- Height: 6 ft 1 in (185 cm)
- Weight: 202 lb (92 kg; 14 st 6 lb)
- Position: Forward
- Shot: Right
- Played for: HC Zlín; Tappara Tampere; HC Oceláři Třinec; HC Kometa Brno; HC Slovan Bratislava
- National team: Czechoslovakia and Czech Republic
- NHL draft: 74th overall, 1990; Winnipeg Jets
- Playing career: 1989–2012

Roman Meluzín (born 17 June 1972) is a Czech former professional ice hockey player who played with HC Slovan Bratislava in the Slovak Extraliga.

Previously he played for HC Zlín, Tappara Tampere, HC Oceláři Třinec and HC Kometa Brno.
