= Ota Čermák =

Czech organist and composer (1919–1963)

Ota Čermák (10 April 1919 – 21 August 1963) was a Czech organist and composer of easy listening music. He played on Hammond organ. He recorded numerous songs on the national Czechoslovak label Supraphon and sometimes for foreign labels (e.g. Romania's Electrecord).

== Life ==
He was born on 10 April 1919, in Kladno County, Kročehlavy, (Note: Kročehlavy City) and died on 21 August 1963 in a car crash near Čáslav.

He died on 21 August 1963 near Čáslav as a result of a car accident.

== His most success ==
Record data

Riccardo Eugenio Drigo: Serenade (Les Millions d'Arlequin) Harlekýnovy Milióny
Ethelbert Woodbridge Nevin: Narcissus (Water Scenes)
Ernst Fischer: Terrasse am Meer (Südlich der Alpen) Terasa nad mořem (Jížně od Alp)
Sebatian Yradier: La Paloma

=== Other records ===
- Jan Hála: Ukolébavka (Lullaby)
- Husím Pochodem (Geese)
- Federico Garcia Lorca, Jan Seidel: Lola
- Antonín Jedlicka: Vzpomínky
- Jaroslav Křička: Bábinčin maršovský valčík (from the opera Ogaři)

(Note: "Filmové melodie - Bábinčin maršovský valčík". velkyzpevnik.cz. 2011. lyrics)

- Rafael Hernandez: Cachita
- Bedrich Nikodem, Jaromír Horec: Sedmikráska (Bellis perennis, "eye of the day")
- Jaroslav Ježek: Melodia Jaroslava Ježka
- Bohuslav Nádvorník, R. A. Dvorský, Saša Grossmann: Polibek
- Gustav Langer: Babička (Mom)
- Joseph Haydn, Anne Hunter: Sjezdovka Solisko
- Oskar Schima, Jiří Strnad: Maminko, kup mi koníčka ("Mamma buy me a horse", sung by Oldřich Kovář)
- Ota Čermák: Dědečkovy hodiny
- Ota Čermák: Alfa lipsi (Dance is my Life)
- Alfons Jindra, R. A. Dvorský, Vladimír Dvořák: Cesta domů (Homewards)
- Johnny Heykens: Zastaveníčko (Serenade)
- Jan Sibelius: Valse Triste
- Ota Čermák: Perníková Polka
- Jaroslav Dudek: Dešťové Kapky (Raindrops) Supraphon SUED 1013
- Robert Schumann: Snění (Kinderscenen, Träumerei)
- Christina Rosettiová, Jan Seidel: Až umru, můj miláčku
- Richard Wagner: Svatební Pochod Ke Hre W. Shakespeara Sen Noci Svatojánské (A Midsummer Night's Dream) (Note: According to reference lists, Wagner is the composer)
- Tatranské pastorale
- Ota Čermák: Mountain pastorale – Gingerbread polka, Mistletoe Supraphon SUED 1014
- Nocturno
- Discography, other list
- Disks for home edition labelled in Czech; for export, labelled in English
