= Karl Čermak =

Karl Čermak (26 May 1881 – 24 October 1924) was a German socialist politician. A skilled organizer, Čermak emerged as a key leader of the labour movement in German Bohemia in the years preceding World War I. He went on to become a parliamentarian in the First Czechoslovak Republic.

== Early life and work ==
Čermak was born in Vienna on 26 May 1881. He was the son of a shoemaker. Čermak worked as a clerk.

In 1905, he became a member of the board of the SDAPÖ organization in Bohemia. Between 1907 and 1911 he served as editor of the newspaper Freiheit in Teplitz-Schönau. He headed the regional secretariat of the Social Democracy in German Bohemia 1911–1919.

During World War I he served as general manager of the Nutritional Association based in Aussig. In 1918 he was appointed director of the Press Bureau of the regional government of German Bohemia.

== DSAP leader and parliamentarian ==
After the creation of Czechoslovakia, he became a key leader of the German Social Democratic Workers Party in the Czechoslovak Republic (DSAP). He was noted for his strong organizational skills. In contrast to his peers, Čermak was the sole member of the 1920s DSAP leadership that hailed from a major city (having been born in Vienna).

In September 1919 he was named Central Secretary of the party. He was opposed to cooperation with the Czechoslovak Social Democratic Workers Party, which he saw as 'national chauvinists'. After Josef Seliger's death, Čermak was named Vice Chairman of DSAP. He represented DSAP in the Czechoslovak National Assembly 1920–1924, having been elected from the 5th constituency (Česká Lípa) in the April 1920 election. He was a member of the Standing Committee of the National Assembly.

== Death ==
Cermak died in Prague on 24 October 1924 at the age of 43. He was replaced by Siegfried Taub as new Central Secretary of DSAP.
