= Jaroslav Kalla =

Czech ice hockey player

- Born: December 7, 1979 (age 46) Kladno, Czechoslovakia
- Height: 6 ft 0 in (183 cm)
- Weight: 205 lb (93 kg; 14 st 9 lb)
- Position: Forward
- Shoots: Right
- Czech Extraliga team: HC Kladno
- Playing career: 1998–present

Jaroslav Kalla (born December 7, 1979) is a Czech professional ice hockey player. He played with HC Kladno in the Czech Extraliga during the 2010–11 Czech Extraliga season.
