= Pär Bäcker =

Swedish ice hockey player (born 1982)

- Born: 4 January 1982 (age 44) Grums, Sweden
- Height: 6 ft 1 in (185 cm)
- Weight: 179 lb (81 kg; 12 st 11 lb)
- Position: Centre
- Shot: Left
- Oddset Ligaen team: AaB Ishockey
- NHL draft: 187th overall, 2000; Detroit Red Wings
- Playing career: 1998–2010

Pär Bäcker (born 4 January 1982) is a Swedish professional ice hockey player. He is currently playing for the AaB Ishockey in the Oddset Ligaen.

After good seasons with both Grums IK and Bofors IK in Allsvenskan Bäcker was signed by the Swedish Elite club Färjestads BK in 2001. But, by that time, his talent had also been spotted also another club, the NHL club Detroit Red Wings, who had drafted him one year earlier in the Entry Draft (6th round/187 pick overall). After a mediocre regular season with Färjestad he had great success in the playoffs when he scored 6 points in 10 games and helped Färjestad win their sixth Swedish Championship. The following season he continued to play as he had done in the playoffs and he finished the year with a total of 27 points in 49 games. After such a successful season, many hockey experts thought that Bäcker would become a big Swedish star in the future. However, that success did not continue in the 2003–04 season, as he registered just 13 points in 49 games in the regular season, and 0 points in 17 games in the playoffs. Things went even worse in both 2004–05 and 2005–06 seasons, as he only scored 11 points in 104 total games over that stretch. In the playoffs of 2005–06 he wasn't even allowed to practice with the team. He then decided to change clubs, and signed with Färjestad's rival, Djurgårdens IF, in April 2006.

== Career statistics ==
=== Regular season and playoffs ===
			Regular season					Playoffs
Season	Team	League	GP	G	A	Pts	PIM	GP	G	A	Pts	PIM
1998–99	Grums IK	SWE.2	17	1	1	2	4	—	—	—	—	—
1999–2000	Grums IK	Allsv	46	12	10	22	24	—	—	—	—	—
2000–01	Bofors IK	Allsv	41	20	15	35	47	—	—	—	—	—
2001–02	Färjestads BK	SEL	47	4	8	12	16	10	5	1	6	10
2002–03	Färjestads BK	SEL	49	11	16	27	46	12	1	1	2	12
2003–04	Färjestads BK	SEL	49	7	6	13	24	17	0	0	0	8
2004–05	Färjestads BK	SEL	49	3	3	6	18	15	1	1	2	2
2005–06	Färjestads BK	SEL	40	1	2	3	16	—	—	—	—	—
2006–07	Djurgårdens IF	SEL	55	9	24	33	32	—	—	—	—	—
2007–08	Djurgårdens IF	SEL	49	9	13	22	44	4	0	0	0	0
2008–09	AaB Ishockey	DEN	40	15	16	31	26	4	0	3	3	0
2009–10	AaB Ishockey	DEN	36	10	25	35	24	14	3	8	11	6
SEL totals			338	44	72	116	196	58	7	3	10	32

=== International ===
Year	Team	Event	GP	G	A	Pts	PIM
2001	Sweden	WJC	7	3	1	4	4
2002	Sweden	WJC	7	1	0	1	4
Junior totals			14	4	1	5	8
