= Vitaly Atyushov =

Russian ice hockey player (born 1979)

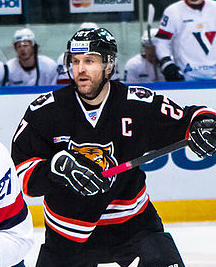
- Born: July 4, 1979 (age 46) Penza, Soviet Union
- Height: 6 ft 2 in (188 cm)
- Weight: 196 lb (89 kg; 14 st 0 lb)
- Position: Defence
- Shot: Left
- Played for: Krylya Sovetov Moscow; Molot-Prikamye Perm; Ak Bars Kazan; Metallurg Magnitogorsk; Salavat Yulaev Ufa; Atlant Moscow Oblast; Traktor Chelyabinsk; Amur Khabarovsk; Neftekhimik Nizhnekamsk
- National team: Russia
- NHL draft: 276th overall, 2002; Ottawa Senators
- Playing career: 1996–2020

Vitaly Georgiyevich Atyushov (Russian: Виталий Георгиевич Атюшов; born July 4, 1979) is a Russian former professional ice hockey defenceman who played in the Kontinental Hockey League (KHL). Atyushov was drafted 276th overall in the 9th round by the Ottawa Senators in the 2002 NHL entry draft.

On July 7, 2014, Atyushov left Atlant Moscow Oblast after the 2013–14 season, and signed a one-year contract as a free agent with Traktor Chelyabinsk. After one season with Chelyabinsk, Atyushov continued his playing career in agreeing to a one-year deal with Amur Khabarovsk on August 12, 2015.

== Career statistics ==
=== Regular season and playoffs ===
			Regular season					Playoffs
Season	Team	League	GP	G	A	Pts	PIM	GP	G	A	Pts	PIM
1995–96	Krylya Sovetov–2 Moscow	RUS.2	37	0	2	2	14	—	—	—	—	—
1996–97	Krylya Sovetov Moscow	RSL	7	0	0	0	4	2	0	1	1	0
1996–97	Krylya Sovetov–2 Moscow	RUS.3	48	4	10	14	81	—	—	—	—	—
1997–98	Krylya Sovetov Moscow	RSL	5	0	0	0	2	—	—	—	—	—
1997–98	Krylya Sovetov–2 Moscow	RUS.3	11	1	0	1	10	—	—	—	—	—
1998–99	Dizel Penza	RUS.2	22	0	0	0	22	—	—	—	—	—
1998–99	Dizel–2 Penza	RUS.3	2	1	1	2	2	—	—	—	—	—
1998–99	Krylya Sovetov Moscow	RSL	17	1	0	1	20	—	—	—	—	—
1999–2000	Molot–Prikamye Perm	RSL	38	4	0	4	48	3	0	0	0	12
2000–01	Molot–Prikamye Perm	RSL	44	3	10	13	32	—	—	—	—	—
2001–02	Molot–Prikamye Perm	RSL	51	4	7	11	64	—	—	—	—	—
2002–03	Ak Bars Kazan	RSL	33	0	9	9	12	2	0	0	0	0
2003–04	Metallurg Magnitogorsk	RSL	56	5	9	14	26	14	2	3	5	6
2004–05	Metallurg Magnitogorsk	RSL	58	6	18	24	42	5	2	0	2	0
2005–06	Metallurg Magnitogorsk	RSL	51	7	12	19	64	11	2	0	2	4
2006–07	Metallurg Magnitogorsk	RSL	54	7	20	27	46	15	3	9	12	10
2007–08	Metallurg Magnitogorsk	RSL	56	10	33	43	32	10	1	4	5	2
2008–09	Metallurg Magnitogorsk	KHL	55	8	27	35	34	12	1	6	7	8
2009–10	Metallurg Magnitogorsk	KHL	49	5	17	22	45	10	1	2	3	6
2010–11	Metallurg Magnitogorsk	KHL	46	6	14	20	36	20	0	7	7	16
2011–12	Salavat Yulaev Ufa	KHL	49	4	13	18	26	6	0	3	3	4
2012–13	Salavat Yulaev Ufa	KHL	40	0	13	13	20	14	1	3	4	0
2013–14	Atlant Moscow Oblast	KHL	40	0	7	7	18	—	—	—	—	—
2014–15	Traktor Chelyabinsk	KHL	53	1	8	9	26	6	0	1	1	4
2015–16	Amur Khabarovsk	KHL	59	0	6	6	44	—	—	—	—	—
2016–17	Amur Khabarovsk	KHL	46	3	4	7	39	—	—	—	—	—
2017–18	Amur Khabarovsk	KHL	47	4	12	16	22	3	0	1	1	2
2018–19	Amur Khabarovsk	KHL	44	2	10	12	28	—	—	—	—	—
2019–20	Neftekhimik Nizhnekamsk	KHL	45	2	3	5	16	4	0	0	0	2
RSL totals			470	47	118	165	392	62	10	17	27	34
KHL totals			573	35	135	170	354	75	3	23	26	42

=== International ===
Year	Team	Event	Result	GP	G	A	Pts	PIM
1997	Russia	EJC	4th	5	0	0	0	0
2006	Russia	WC	5th	7	0	2	2	10
2007	Russia	WC	3rd place, bronze medalist(s)	9	0	3	3	4
2009	Russia	WC	1st place, gold medalist(s)	9	2	5	7	0
2010	Russia	WC	2nd place, silver medalist(s)	9	0	4	4	8
2011	Russia	WC	4th	9	1	2	3	4
Senior totals				43	3	16	19	26
