= Jan Peterek =

Czech ice hockey player

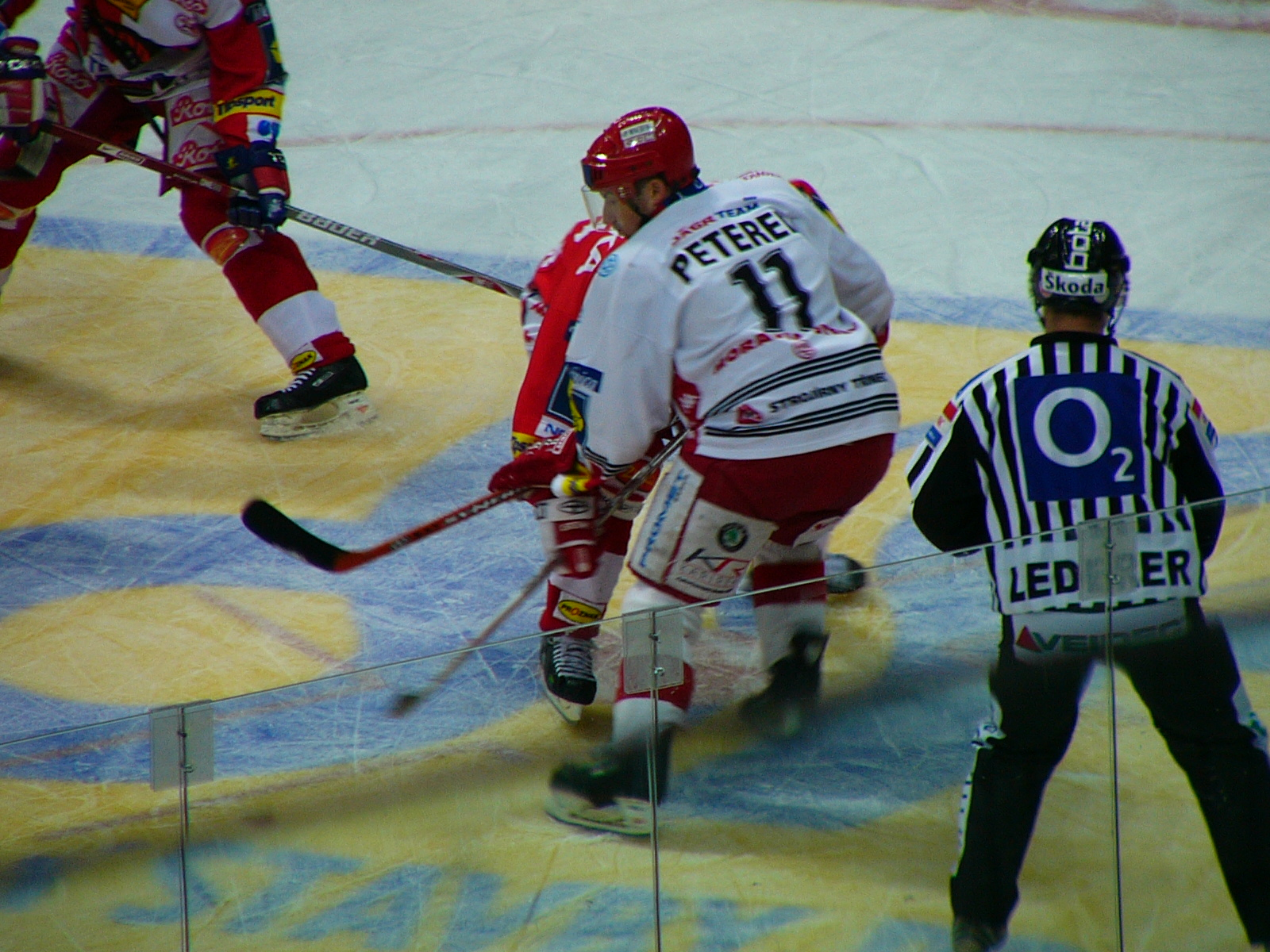
- Born: October 17, 1971 (age 54) Havířov, Czechoslovakia
- Height: 6 ft 2 in (188 cm)
- Weight: 183 lb (83 kg; 13 st 1 lb)
- Position: Forward
- Shoots: Left
- Czech Extraliga team: HC Oceláři Třinec
- National team: Czech Republic
- Playing career: 1989–present

Jan Peterek (born October 17, 1971) is a Czech professional ice hockey player. He played with HC Oceláři Třinec in the Czech Extraliga during the 2010–11 Czech Extraliga season.
