= Vladimír Čermák =

Czech philosopher, political scientist, lawyer and judge (1929-2004)

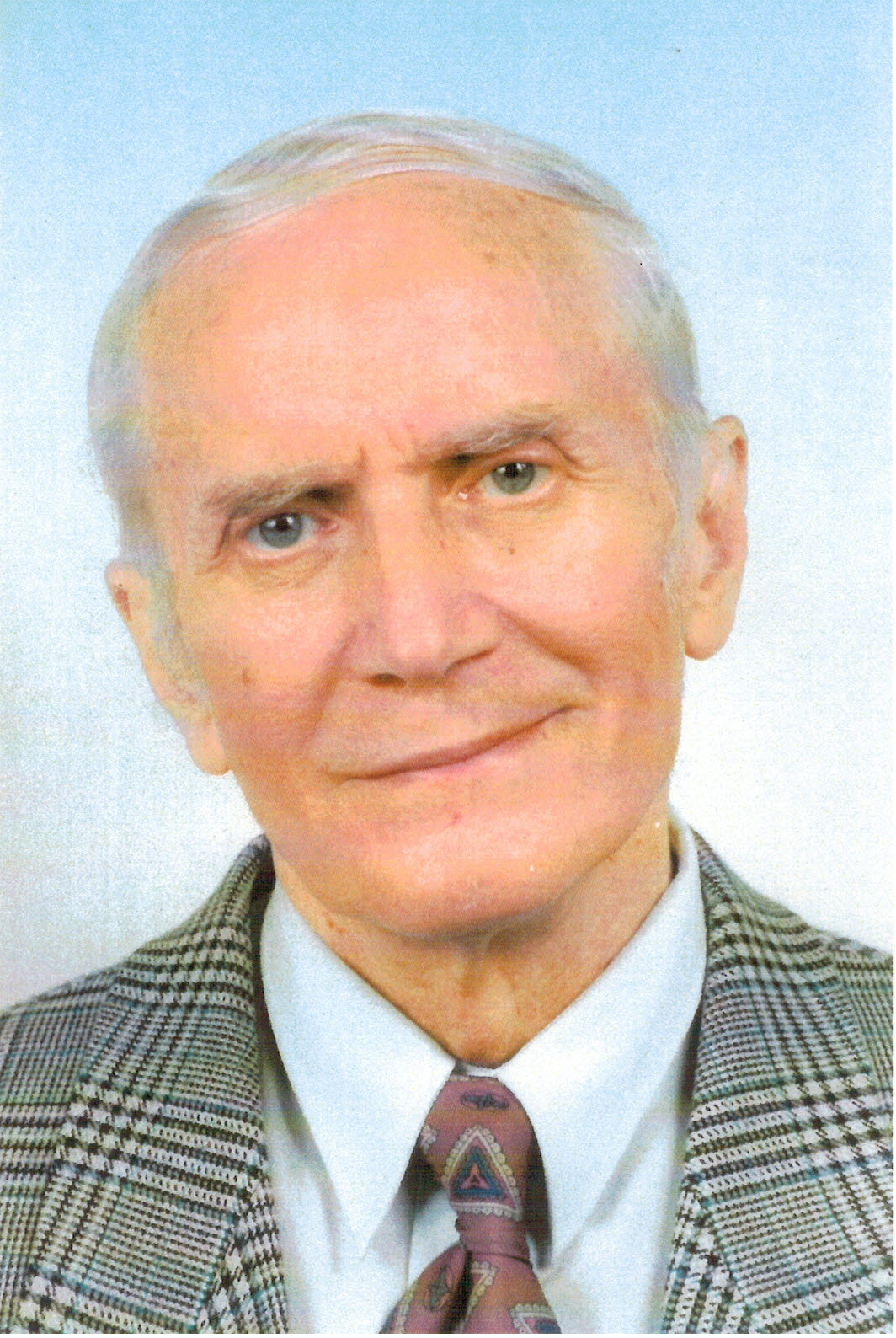

Vladimír Čermák (September 3, 1929 – July 21, 2004) was a Czech philosopher, political scientist, lawyer and judge.

He is author of the pentalogy called The Question of Democracy (Otázka demokracie), which was very likely the most systematic work on democracy from the perspective of political theory during the period of the communist regime in Czechoslovakia. The pentalogy was finished in 1988 but it could be published after the end of the communist regime. The titles of five volumes are: “Democracy and Totalitarianism”, “Man”, “Society and State”, “Values, Norms and Institutions” and “Functions of Democracy”. The pentalogy was not reflected enough by politologists in the Czech republic and abroad yet.

In 1993–2003 Čermák served as a judge of the Constitutional Court of the Czech Republic.
