= Magnus Wernblom =

Swedish ice hockey player

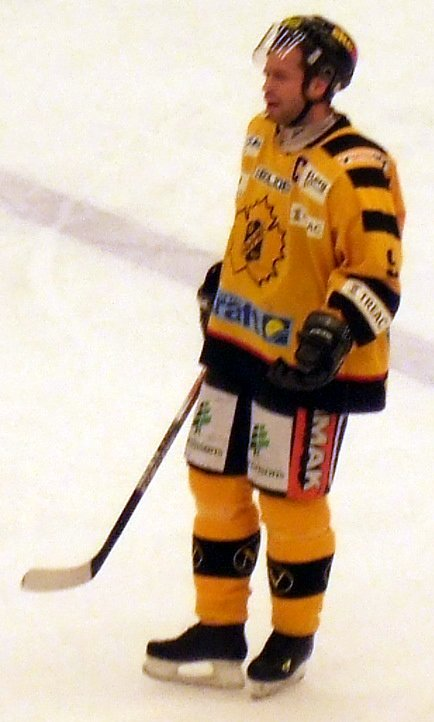
- Magnus Wernblom playing an away game for Skellefteå AIK against Timrå IK in the Swedish Elite League in January 2007
- Born: 3 February 1973 (age 53) Kramfors, Sweden
- Height: 6 ft 0 in (183 cm)
- Weight: 213 lb (97 kg; 15 st 3 lb)
- Position: Right wing
- Shot: Left
- Played for: Modo Hockey; Skellefteå AIK
- NHL draft: 207th overall, 1992; Los Angeles Kings
- Playing career: 1991–2008

Magnus Wernblom (born 3 February 1973) is a Swedish former professional ice hockey forward who spent most of his active career playing for Modo Hockey in the Swedish Elitserien league, where he holds the franchise scoring record for most all-time goals (276) as well as the second highest franchise record for most games played (723). He also spent a few seasons playing for Skellefteå AIK of the same league, before returning to Modo Hockey in 2007. He announced his retirement from hockey on 4 November 2008. Magnus Wernblom is an icon and a cult figure in Modo Hockey.

== After retirement ==
On 17 November 2009 Wermblom had his jersey number retired at the Fjällräven Center in his native Örnsköldsvik.

== Career statistics ==
=== Regular season and playoffs ===
| | | | Regular season | | | | | Playoffs |
| Season | Team | League | GP | G | A | Pts | PIM | GP | G | A | Pts | PIM |
|---|---|---|---|---|---|---|---|---|---|---|---|---|
| 1987–88 | Kramfors-Alliansen | SWE.3 | 8 | 1 | 0 | 1 | | — | — | — | — | — |
| 1988–89 | Kramfors-Alliansen | SWE.3 | 16 | 16 | 5 | 21 | | — | — | — | — | — |
| 1990–91 | Modo Hockey | SWE U20 |
| 1990–91 | Modo Hockey | SEL | 16 | 4 | 2 | 6 | 8 | — | — | — | — | — |
| 1991–92 | Modo Hockey | SEL | 35 | 6 | 7 | 13 | 50 | — | — | — | — | — |
| 1992–93 | Modo Hockey | SWE.2 Jr | 9 | 8 | 9 | 17 | 42 | — | — | — | — | — |
| 1992–93 | Modo Hockey | SEL | 37 | 8 | 3 | 11 | 36 | 3 | 0 | 0 | 0 | 0 |
| 1993–94 | Modo Hockey | SEL | 39 | 14 | 9 | 23 | 46 | 11 | 2 | 3 | 5 | 12 |
| 1994–95 | Modo Hockey | SEL | 38 | 12 | 10 | 22 | 50 | — | — | — | — | — |
| 1995–96 | Modo Hockey | SEL | 28 | 16 | 8 | 24 | 40 | 8 | 3 | 0 | 3 | 10 |
| 1996–97 | Modo Hockey | SEL | 50 | 26 | 9 | 35 | 78 | — | — | — | — | — |
| 1997–98 | Modo Hockey | SEL | 44 | 18 | 12 | 30 | 64 | 8 | 2 | 3 | 5 | 36 |
| 1998–99 | Modo Hockey | SEL | 42 | 20 | 13 | 33 | 100 | 9 | 1 | 3 | 4 | 12 |
| 1999–2000 | Modo Hockey | SEL | 49 | 20 | 10 | 30 | 84 | 13 | 8 | 5 | 13 | 66 |
| 2000–01 | Modo Hockey | SEL | 45 | 13 | 6 | 19 | 36 | 7 | 4 | 1 | 5 | 20 |
| 2001–02 | Modo Hockey | SEL | 42 | 14 | 16 | 30 | 75 | 10 | 3 | 1 | 4 | 18 |
| 2002–03 | Modo Hockey | SEL | 45 | 26 | 19 | 45 | 48 | 6 | 3 | 1 | 4 | 14 |
| 2003–04 | Modo Hockey | SEL | 47 | 14 | 11 | 25 | 88 | 3 | 1 | 2 | 3 | 29 |
| 2004–05 | Skellefteå AIK | SWE.2 | 39 | 20 | 25 | 45 | 63 | 10 | 4 | 6 | 10 | 2 |
| 2005–06 | Skellefteå AIK | SWE.2 | 42 | 37 | 21 | 58 | 71 | 10 | 4 | 5 | 9 | 8 |
| 2006–07 | Skellefteå AIK | SEL | 49 | 25 | 10 | 35 | 79 | — | — | — | — | — |
| 2007–08 | Modo Hockey | SEL | 54 | 27 | 11 | 38 | 98 | 3 | 0 | 0 | 0 | 31 |
| 2008–09 | Modo Hockey | SEL | 17 | 2 | 2 | 4 | 30 | — | — | — | — | — |
| SEL totals | | | 677 | 266 | 157 | 423 | 1010 | 81 | 27 | 19 | 46 | 244 |

=== International ===
| Year | Team | Event | GP | G | A | Pts | PIM |
|---|---|---|---|---|---|---|---|
| 1991 | Sweden | EJC | 4 | 4 | 3 | 7 | 36 |
| 1993 | Sweden | WJC | 7 | 2 | 3 | 5 | 24 |
| Junior totals | | | 11 | 6 | 6 | 12 | 60 |
