= Jyrki Louhi =

Finnish ice hockey player

- Position: Forward
- SM-liiga team: HPK

Jyrki Louhi is a retired Finnish professional ice hockey forward who played for HPK and Jokerit in the SM-liiga.
