= Ondřej Veselý =

Czech ice hockey player

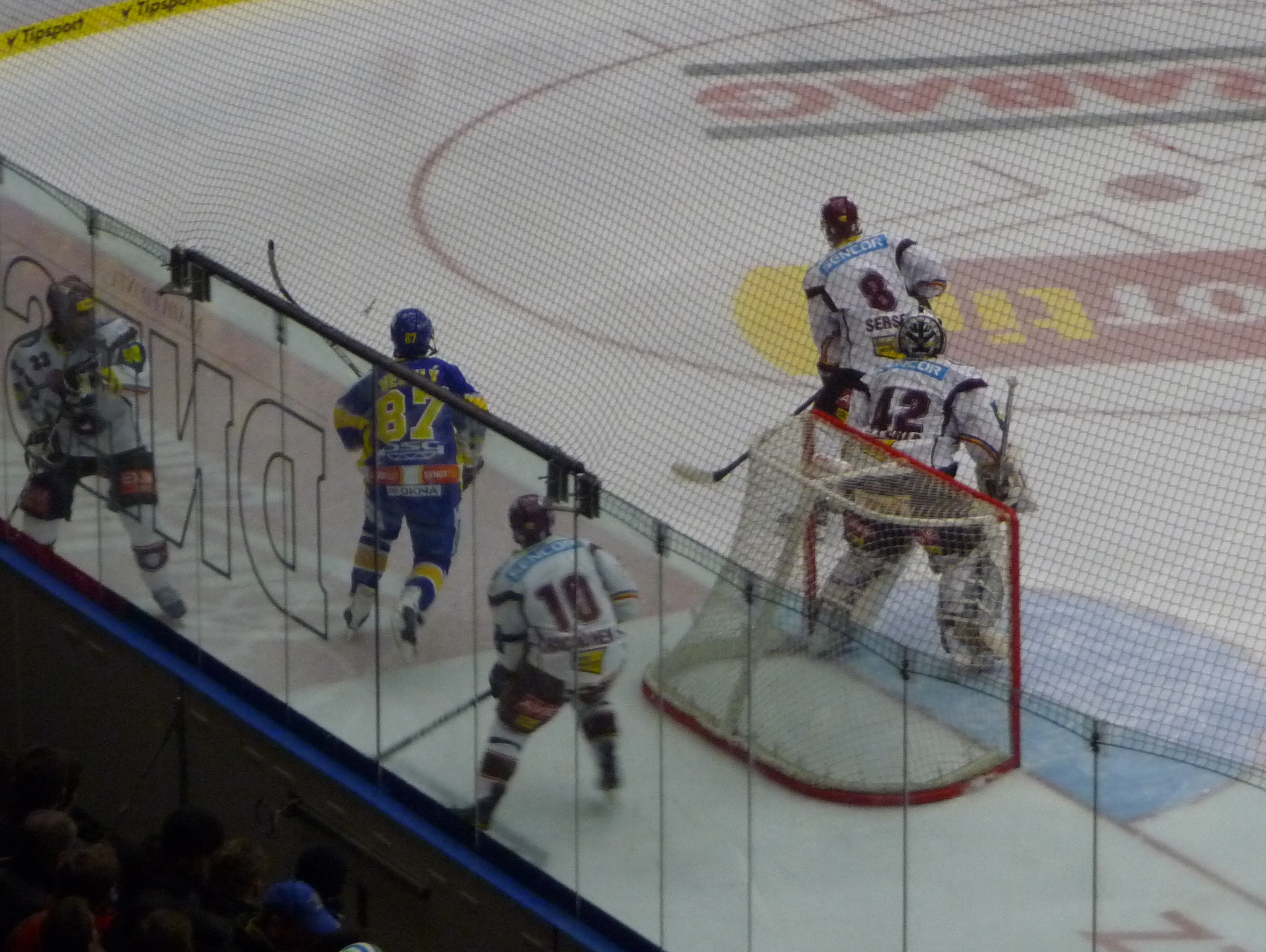
- Born: December 6, 1977 (age 48) Gottwaldov, Czechoslovakia
- Height: 5 ft 11 in (180 cm)
- Weight: 191 lb (87 kg; 13 st 9 lb)
- Position: Forward
- Shoots: Left
- Czech Extraliga team: HC Kometa Brno
- NHL draft: Undrafted
- Playing career: 1996–present

Ondřej Veselý (born December 6, 1977) is a Czech professional ice hockey player who currently plays with HC Kometa Brno in the Czech Extraliga. Veselý previously played for Portland Winter Hawks, Tri City Americans, HC Zlín, HC Vsetín and HC České Budějovice.
