= Greger Artursson =

Swedish ice hockey player

- Born: 6 February 1972 (age 53); Västerås, Sweden
- Height: 5 ft 9 in (175 cm)
- Weight: 187 lb (85 kg; 13 st 5 lb)
- Position: Defence
- Shot: Left
- Played for: Färjestads BK; EC Red Bull Salzburg; Mora IK
- National team: Sweden
- Playing career: 1989–2010

Greger Artursson (born 6 February 1972 in Västerås, Sweden) is a Swedish former professional ice hockey Defenseman who played predominantly in the Elitserien with Färjestads BK.

Artursson began his professional career in 1988 with Färjestads, which he played with from 1988–1992 and 1995–2004. Between 1992 and 1995 did he represented Vita Hästen and Troja-Ljungby in the second highest league in Sweden. During his second stint with Färjestad did he won the Swedish Championship three times, 1997, 1998 and 2002. In the 1998 final-series Färjestad play against arch-rival Djurgårdens IF and the fifth and last game of series went to overtime and Artursson became big hero when he scored in overtime shooting the puck past Djurgården-goalie Tommy Söderström and ended the game.

After four years with EC Red Bull Salzburg in the Austrian Hockey League, Greger returned to Sweden in 2008 to play with Mora IK in the HockeyAllsvenskan. After captaining his second year with Mora, Artursson retired from professional hockey on 13 March 2010 after his final game against Almtuna IS to take up a post as a vendor in a sports company.

== Career statistics ==
			Regular season					Playoffs
Season	Team	League	GP	G	A	Pts	PIM	GP	G	A	Pts	PIM
1987–88	Färjestad BK J18	J18 Elit	—	—	—	—	—	—	—	—	—	—
1988–89	Färjestad BK J20	Juniorserien	—	—	—	—	—	—	—	—	—	—
1988–89	Färjestad BK	Elitserien	2	0	0	0	0	—	—	—	—	—
1989–90	Färjestad BK J20	Juniorserien	—	—	—	—	—	—	—	—	—	—
1989–90	Färjestad BK	Elitserien	3	0	0	0	2	—	—	—	—	—
1990–91	Färjestad BK J20	Juniorserien	—	—	—	—	—	—	—	—	—	—
1990–91	Färjestad BK	Elitserien	24	0	1	1	4	7	0	0	0	0
1991–92	Färjestad BK	Elitserien	15	2	2	4	4	—	—	—	—	—
1991–92	Grums IK	Division 1	15	4	4	8	30	—	—	—	—	—
1992–93	HC Vita Hästen	Division 1	35	7	10	17	24	2	0	0	0	4
1993–94	HC Vita Hästen	Division 1	34	8	7	15	28	10	2	4	6	14
1994–95	IF Troja-Ljungby	Division 1	35	9	18	27	20	8	1	1	2	2
1995–96	Färjestad BK	Elitserien	39	4	7	11	18	4	1	0	1	2
1996–97	Färjestad BK	Elitserien	50	6	10	16	32	12	2	3	5	12
1997–98	Färjestad BK	Elitserien	44	6	8	14	12	12	1	1	2	10
1998–99	Färjestad BK	Elitserien	49	3	10	13	28	4	0	3	3	2
1999–00	Färjestad BK	Elitserien	49	10	11	21	40	7	3	1	4	16
2000–01	Färjestad BK	Elitserien	47	9	19	28	30	16	6	5	11	18
2001–02	Färjestad BK	Elitserien	50	11	6	17	22	10	3	4	7	6
2002–03	Färjestad BK	Elitserien	50	7	15	22	22	14	1	2	3	8
2003–04	Färjestad BK	Elitserien	50	6	11	17	34	16	0	3	3	6
2004–05	EC Salzburg	EBEL	44	12	20	32	38	—	—	—	—	—
2005–06	EC Salzburg	EBEL	46	10	30	40	34	11	1	6	7	12
2006–07	EC Salzburg	EBEL	36	5	23	28	48	5	0	2	2	6
2007–08	EC Salzburg	EBEL	23	3	11	14	12	14	1	3	4	8
2008–09	Mora IK	HockeyAllsvenskan	39	4	27	31	20	—	—	—	—	—
2009–10	Mora IK	HockeyAllsvenskan	50	13	29	42	28	2	0	2	2	4
Elitserien totals			472	64	100	164	248	102	17	22	39	80
