= Josef Beránek =

Czech ice hockey player, coach (born 1969)

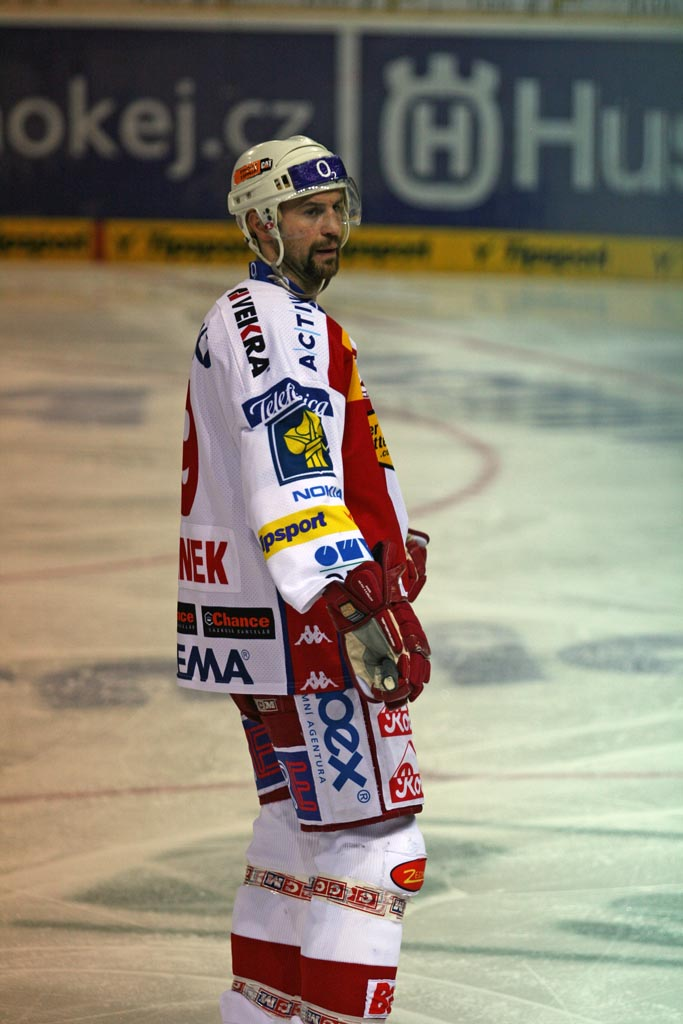
- Born: October 25, 1969 (age 56) Litvínov, Czechoslovakia
- Height: 6 ft 2 in (188 cm)
- Weight: 185 lb (84 kg; 13 st 3 lb)
- Position: Centre
- Shot: Left
- Played for: TJ CHZ Litvínov; HK Dukla Trenčín; Edmonton Oilers; Philadelphia Flyers; HC Vsetín; Vancouver Canucks; Pittsburgh Penguins; HC Slavia Praha
- National team: Czechoslovakia and Czech Republic
- NHL draft: 78th overall, 1989; Edmonton Oilers
- Playing career: 1991–2010

Josef Beránek (Czech pronunciation: [ˈjozɛv ˈbɛraːnɛk]; born 25 October 1969) is a Czech former professional ice hockey player and coach. He was selected in the fourth round of the 1989 NHL entry draft, 78th overall, by the Edmonton Oilers. He has extensive professional playing experience, in the Czech Republic, the AHL, and the NHL. At the NHL level, he has played for the Oilers, Philadelphia Flyers, Vancouver Canucks, and Pittsburgh Penguins. He ended his playing career with HC Slavia Praha in the Czech Republic. In 1998, Beránek was part of the Czech Republic's gold-medal winning Olympic ice hockey team.

His father Josef Beránek Sr. (1942–2024) was an ice hockey forward (Litvínov) and coach (Litvínov, Karlovy Vary, Slavia Prague).

== Career statistics ==
=== Regular season and playoffs ===
			Regular season					Playoffs
Season	Team	League	GP	G	A	Pts	PIM	GP	G	A	Pts	PIM
1987–88	TJ CHZ Litvínov	CSSR Jr	40	38	42	80	75	—	—	—	—	—
1987–88	TJ CHZ Litvínov	CSSR	14	7	4	11	12	—	—	—	—	—
1988–89	TJ CHZ Litvínov	CSSR	23	14	8	22	47	9	4	2	6	—
1989–90	ASVŠ Dukla Trenčín	CSSR	49	19	23	42	—	—	—	—	—	—
1990–91	CHZ Litvínov	CSSR	50	27	27	54	98	8	2	4	6	0
1991–92	Edmonton Oilers	NHL	58	12	16	28	18	12	2	1	3	0
1992–93	Cape Breton Oilers	AHL	6	1	2	3	8	—	—	—	—	—
1992–93	Edmonton Oilers	NHL	26	2	6	8	28	—	—	—	—	—
1992–93	Philadelphia Flyers	NHL	40	13	12	25	50	—	—	—	—	—
1993–94	Philadelphia Flyers	NHL	80	28	21	49	85	—	—	—	—	—
1994–95	Dadák Vsetín	CZE	16	7	7	14	26	—	—	—	—	—
1994–95	Philadelphia Flyers	NHL	14	5	5	10	2	—	—	—	—	—
1994–95	Vancouver Canucks	NHL	37	8	13	21	28	11	1	1	2	12
1995–96	Vancouver Canucks	NHL	61	6	14	20	60	3	2	1	3	0
1996–97	Petra Vsetín	CZE	38	19	24	43	100	3	3	2	5	6
1996–97	Pittsburgh Penguins	NHL	8	3	1	4	4	5	0	0	0	2
1997–98	Petra Vsetín	CZE	45	24	23	47	58	10	2	8	10	12
1998–99	Edmonton Oilers	NHL	66	19	30	49	23	2	0	0	0	4
1999–00	Edmonton Oilers	NHL	58	9	8	17	39	—	—	—	—	—
1999–00	Pittsburgh Penguins	NHL	13	4	4	8	18	11	0	3	3	4
2000–01	Pittsburgh Penguins	NHL	70	9	14	23	43	13	0	2	2	2
2001–02	Slavia Praha	CZE	36	13	20	33	71	9	1	2	3	6
2002–03	Slavia Praha	CZE	46	10	21	31	38	17	2	7	9	28
2003–04	Slavia Praha	CZE	51	16	47	63	93	19	7	11	18	30
2004–05	Slavia Praha	CZE	37	8	17	25	65	7	1	2	3	4
2005–06	Slavia Praha	CZE	50	14	38	52	101	15	1	8	9	28
2006–07	Slavia Praha	CZE	52	19	20	39	44	6	2	0	2	6
2007–08	Slavia Praha	CZE	50	15	15	30	42	12	1	0	1	6
2008–09	Slavia Praha	CZE	50	15	27	42	36	18	4	7	11	14
2009–10	Slavia Praha	CZE	39	6	12	18	6	—	—	—	—	—
CSSR totals			136	67	62	129	—	17	6	6	12	—
CZE totals			510	166	271	437	680	116	24	47	71	140
NHL totals			531	118	144	262	398	57	5	8	13	24

=== International ===
Year	Team	Event	GP	G	A	Pts	PIM
1989	Czechoslovakia	WJC	7	4	9	13	6
1991	Czechoslovakia	CC	5	1	1	2	4
1991	Czechoslovakia	WC	8	2	2	4	6
1993	Czech Republic	WC	8	3	3	6	22
1994	Czech Republic	WC	6	1	2	3	0
1996	Czech Republic	WCH	3	0	0	0	4
1998	Czech Republic	OG	6	1	0	1	4
1998	Czech Republic	WC	9	0	3	3	12
2004	Czech Republic	WC	7	2	2	4	4
Senior totals			52	10	13	23	56

== Transactions ==
- January 16, 1993 – Edmonton trades Beranek and Greg Hawgood to Philadelphia in exchange for Brian Benning
- February 15, 1995 – Philadelphia trades Beranek to Vancouver in exchange for Shawn Antoski
- March 18, 1997 – Vancouver trades Beranek to Pittsburgh in exchange for future considerations.
- June 16, 1998 – Pittsburgh trades Beranek to Edmonton in exchange for Tony Hrkac and Bobby Dollas
- March 14, 2000 – Edmonton trades Beranek to Pittsburgh in exchange for German Titov
