= Michal Broš =

Czech ice hockey player (born 1976)

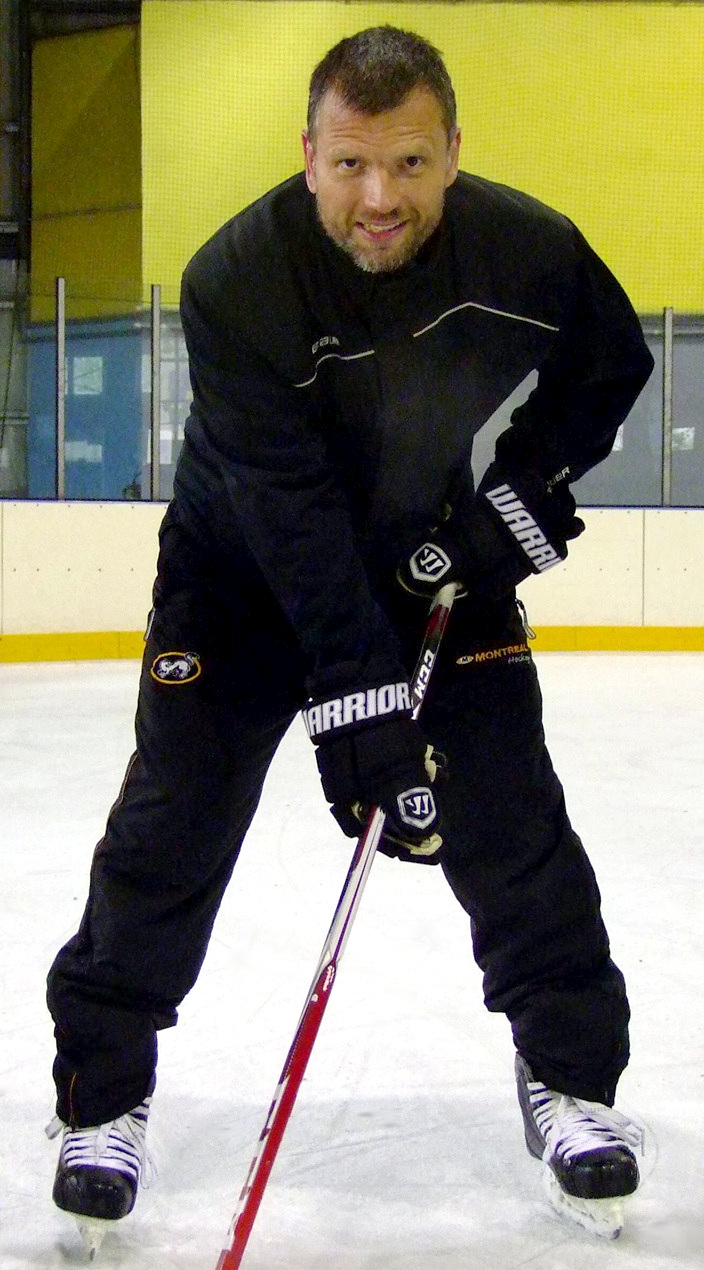
- Born: 25 January 1976 (age 50) Olomouc, Czechoslovakia
- Height: 6 ft 0 in (183 cm)
- Weight: 196 lb (89 kg; 14 st 0 lb)
- Position: Centre
- Shot: Right
- Czech Extraliga team Former teams: HC Sparta Prague; HC Olomouc; HC Vsetin; Kärpät (SM-liiga)
- National team: Czech Republic
- NHL draft: 130th overall, 1995; San Jose Sharks
- Playing career: 1995–2015

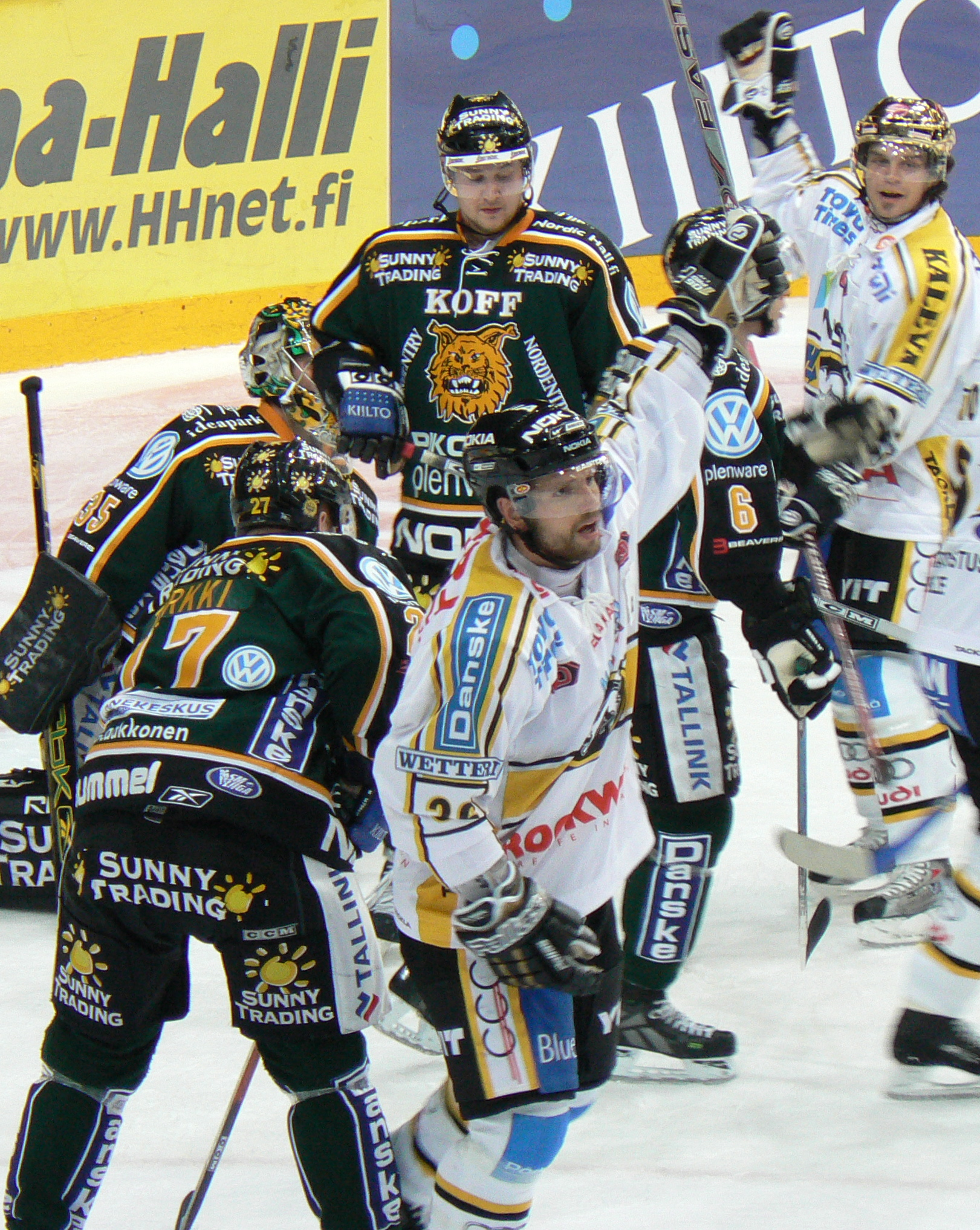
Michal Broš playing for Kärpat in 2007.

Michal Broš (born 25 January 1976) is a Czech former professional ice hockey forward who last played for HC Sparta Prague in the Czech Extraliga.

In his career Broš has won four Czech championships, in 1998 with HC Vsetin and in 1999, 2000 and 2002 with HC Sparta Prague and a Finnish championship in 2007 with Kärpät. He also won the World Ice Hockey Championship in 2000 with the Czech Republic.

He was drafted 130th overall by the San Jose Sharks in the 1995 NHL entry draft, but never signed a contract with the team and remained in the Czech Extraliga.

== Career statistics ==
=== Regular season and playoffs ===
			Regular season					Playoffs
Season	Team	League	GP	G	A	Pts	PIM	GP	G	A	Pts	PIM
1995–96	HC Olomouc	ELH	35	8	12	20	22	4	2	1	3	0
1996–97	HC Olomouc	ELH	48	13	11	24	28	—	—	—	—	—
1997–98	HC Petra Vsetín	ELH	47	14	18	32	28	8	3	1	4	2
1998–99	HC Slovnaft Vsetín	ELH	43	10	18	28	18	12	2	3	5	12
1999–2000	HC Sparta Praha	ELH	49	6	30	36	51	9	1	3	4	4
2000–01	HC Sparta Praha	ELH	27	3	13	16	22	13	4	6	10	8
2001–02	HC Sparta Praha	ELH	48	19	29	48	71	13	7	11	18	8
2002–03	HC Sparta Praha	ELH	40	13	17	30	90	10	2	4	6	8
2003–04	HC Sparta Praha	ELH	46	15	25	40	60	13	1	3	4	6
2004–05	HC Sparta Praha	ELH	44	7	14	21	63	3	1	0	1	0
2005–06	Kärpät	SM-l	47	15	21	36	38	11	3	5	8	6
2006–07	Kärpät	SM-l	50	21	21	42	24	10	6	6	12	8
2007–08	Kärpät	SM-l	53	25	28	53	34	13	5	4	9	6
2008–09	HC Sparta Praha	ELH	45	21	20	41	64	11	2	7	9	30
2009–10	HC Sparta Praha	ELH	51	17	12	29	36	7	1	1	2	4
2010–11	HC Sparta Praha	ELH	49	17	12	29	56	—	—	—	—	—
2011–12	HC Sparta Praha	ELH	51	15	16	31	36	5	0	1	1	6
2012–13	HC Sparta Praha	ELH	44	12	11	23	16	7	1	1	2	2
2013–14	BK Mladá Boleslav	CZE.2	48	19	35	54	51	10	3	6	9	2
2014–15	BK Mladá Boleslav	ELH	33	10	13	23	22	9	1	3	4	2
ELH totals			700	200	271	471	683	124	28	45	73	92
SM-l totals			150	61	70	131	96	34	14	15	29	20

=== International ===
Year	Team	Event	GP	G	A	Pts	PIM
1996	Czech Republic	WJC	6	3	3	6	4
2000	Czech Republic	WC	8	1	0	1	0
2002	Czech Republic	WC	7	0	2	2	4
Senior totals			15	1	2	3	4
