= Jiří Burger =

Czech ice hockey player

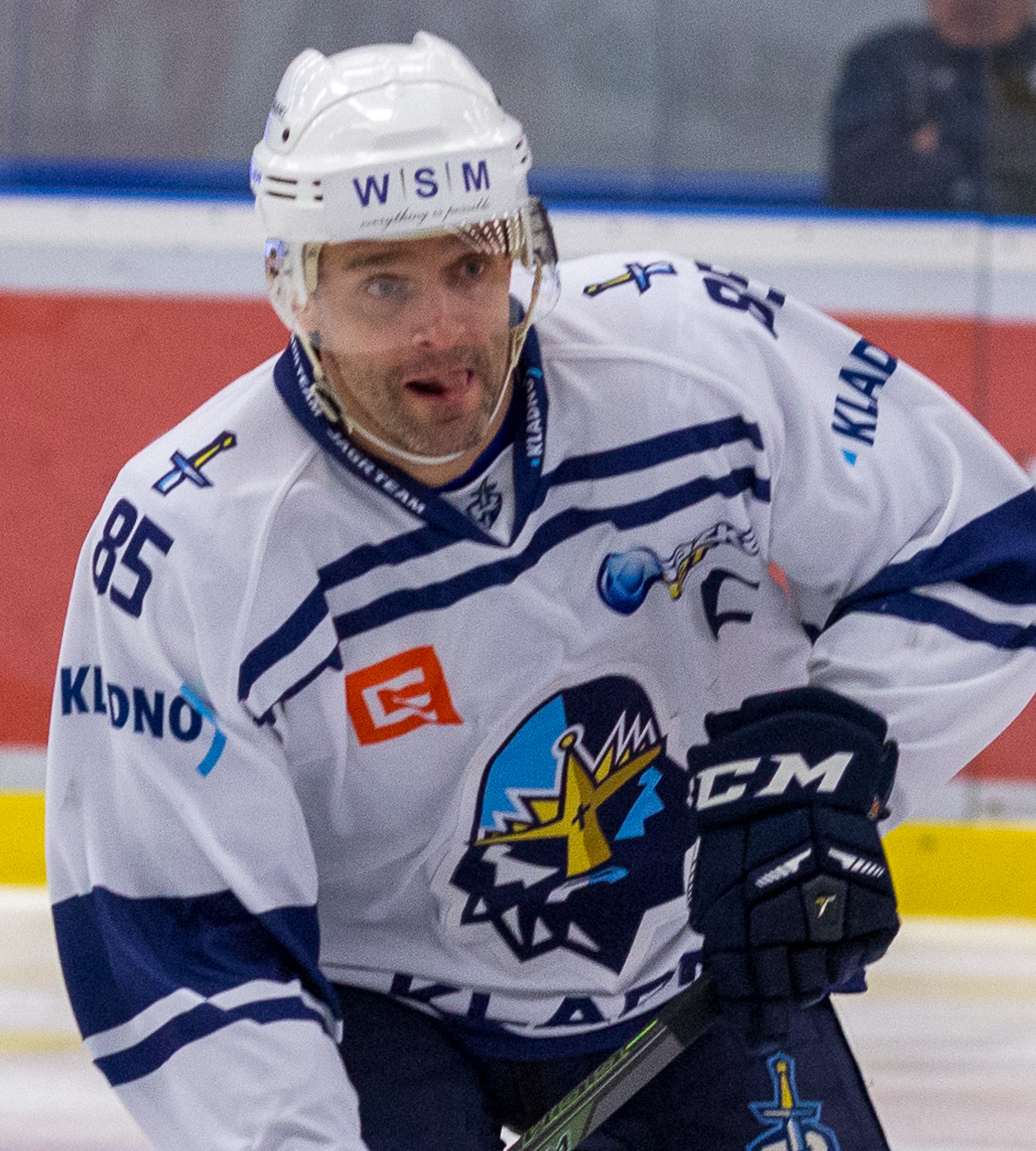
- Born: May 8, 1977 (age 47); Kladno, Czechoslovakia
- Height: 6 ft 0 in (183 cm)
- Weight: 183 lb (83 kg; 13 st 1 lb)
- Position: Forward
- Shoots: Right
- Czech Extraliga team: HC Vítkovice
- National team: Czech Republic
- Playing career: 1994–present

Jiří Burger (born May 8, 1977) is a Czech professional ice hockey player. He played with HC Vítkovice in the Czech Extraliga during the 2010–11 Czech Extraliga season.
