= Petr Ton =

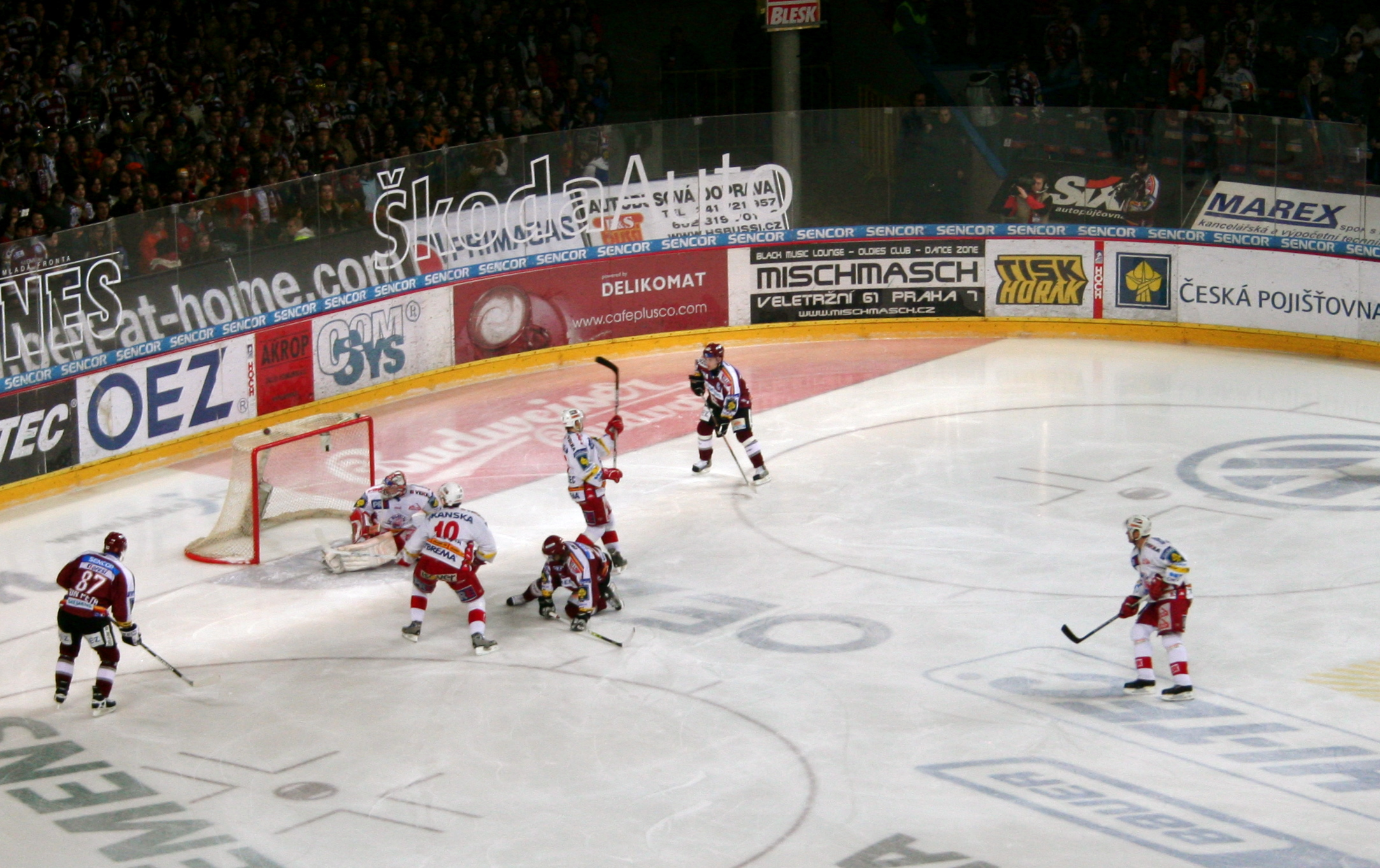
- Petr Ton (far left, #87) scores
- Born: October 8, 1973 (age 53) Slaný, Czechoslovakia
- Height: 6 ft 0 in (183 cm)
- Weight: 209 lb (95 kg; 14 st 13 lb)
- Position: Winger
- Shot: Right
- Played for: HC Kladno; Jokerit; Blues; JYP; Kärpät; HC Sparta Praha; HC Kometa Brno
- National team: Czech Republic
- Playing career: 1995–2011

Petr Ton (born 8 October 1973) is a Czech former professional ice hockey winger.

Ton played in the Czech Extraliga for HC Kladno, HC Sparta Praha and HC Kometa Brno. He also played in the Finnish SM-liiga for Jokerit, Blues, JYP and Oulun Kärpät.

Ton won the Czech Extraliga championship in 2006 and 2007 with Sparta Praha. In 2006-07 season Ton played 67 games and scored 36 goals in Czech Extraliga for HC Sparta Praha.

In 2018 he supports WBHF and Masters WBHFC.

== Career statistics ==
=== Regular season and playoffs ===
			Regular season					Playoffs
Season	Team	League	GP	G	A	Pts	PIM	GP	G	A	Pts	PIM
1991–92	Poldi SONP Kladno	TCH U20	38	16	24	40		—	—	—	—	—
1992–93	Poldi SONP Kladno	TCH	25	7	3	10	27	—	—	—	—	—
1993–94	Poldi SONP Kladno	ELH	20	2	3	5	0	10	2	5	7	4
1994–95	Poldi SONP Kladno	ELH	44	12	14	26	35	10	4	2	6	2
1995–96	HC Poldi Kladno	ELH	38	11	16	27	10	8	1	2	3	0
1996–97	HC Poldi Kladno	ELH	52	18	15	33	35	3	0	0	0	4
1997–98	HC Velvana Kladno	ELH	26	12	8	20	6	—	—	—	—	—
1997–98	Jokerit	SM-l	14	3	3	6	2	8	2	1	3	2
1998–99	Blues	SM-l	49	13	14	27	14	4	0	0	0	0
1999–2000	JYP	SM-l	54	24	30	54	12	—	—	—	—	—
2000–01	JYP	SM-l	56	21	31	52	22	—	—	—	—	—
2001–02	JYP	SM-l	52	21	23	44	41	—	—	—	—	—
2002–03	Kärpät	SM-l	48	24	14	38	10	15	3	7	10	4
2003–04	HC Sparta Praha	ELH	27	8	10	18	6	13	4	5	9	6
2004–05	HC Sparta Praha	ELH	49	17	20	37	18	5	1	1	2	4
2005–06	HC Sparta Praha	ELH	41	24	24	48	18	17	5	4	9	8
2006–07	HC Sparta Praha	ELH	51	25	24	49	45	16	11	5	16	2
2007–08	HC Sparta Praha	ELH	50	27	16	43	8	4	1	0	1	0
2008–09	HC Sparta Praha	ELH	45	19	16	35	10	11	4	9	13	2
2009–10	HC Sparta Praha	ELH	48	34	21	55	39	7	2	1	3	2
2010–11	HC Sparta Praha	ELH	50	13	22	35	16	—	—	—	—	—
2011–12	HC Sparta Praha	ELH	52	25	33	58	22	5	2	3	5	0
2012–13	HC Sparta Praha	ELH	48	25	24	49	10	7	3	4	7	2
2013–14	HC Sparta Praha	ELH	50	35	32	67	22	12	5	7	12	6
2014–15	HC Kometa Brno	ELH	51	22	20	42	16	12	1	3	4	4
2015–16	HC Kometa Brno	ELH	19	6	5	11	2	—	—	—	—	—
2016–17	Rytíři Kladno	CZE.2	49	16	22	38	14	6	2	1	3	2
ELH totals			761	335	323	658	318	140	46	51	97	46
SM-l totals			273	106	115	221	101	27	5	8	13	6

=== International ===
Year	Team	Event	GP	G	A	Pts	PIM
1993	Czechoslovakia	WJC	7	1	5	6	4
