= Trinity Bank Arena Luďka Čajky =

Multi-purpose indoor arena in Zlín, Czech Republic

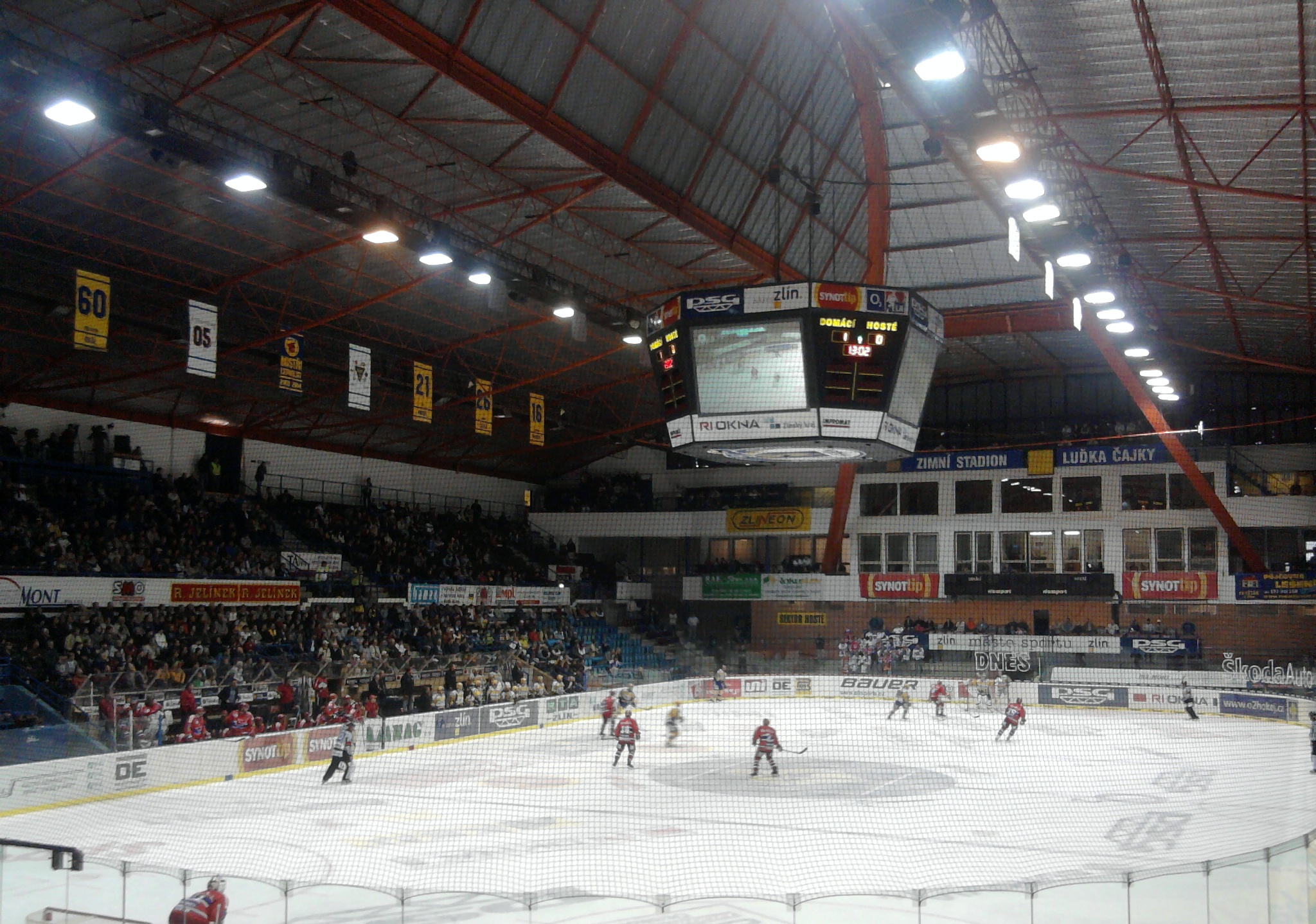
- Interactive map of Trinity Bank Arena Luďka Čajky
- Former names: Zimní stadion Gottwaldov (1957–1990); Zimní stadion Luďka Čajky (1990–2023)
- Location: Březnická 4068, Zlín, Czech Republic 760 01
- Coordinates: 49°13′3.711″N 17°39′35.450″E
- Owner: RI Okna Berani Zlín
- Capacity: 4,525
- Field size: 29 m × 60 m (95 ft × 197 ft)

Construction
- Opened: 1957

Tenant
- RI Okna Berani Zlín (Czech 1. Liga)

Trinity Bank Arena Luďka Čajky is an indoor sporting arena located in Zlín, Czech Republic. The capacity of the arena is 7,000 people and it was built in 1957. It is currently home to the RI Okna Berani Zlín ice hockey team.

== History ==
Roofing of the stadium, which began in 1962, was partially funded by the transfer of footballer Emil Látal. In 1990 the arena was named Zimní stadion Luďka Čajky after Zlín hockey player Ludek Čajka, who was fatally wounded during a game in Košice. By 2018 the arena was the oldest of all in the Czech Extraliga and in need of reconstruction. In 2023 the stadium was renamed to Trinity Bank Arena Luďka Čajky.
