= 2000 Sweden Hockey Games =

Tournament details
- Host country: Sweden
- City: Stockholm
- Venue: 1 (in 1 host city)
- Dates: 8-13 February 2000
- Teams: 5

Final positions
- Champions: Finland (3rd title)
- Runners-up: Czech Republic
- Third place: Canada
- Fourth place: Russia

Tournament statistics
- Games played: 10
- Attendance: 66,802 (6,680 per game)
- Scoring leader: (Canada) Chris Lindberg (3 points)

The 2000 Sweden Hockey Games was played between 8 and 13 February 2000 in Stockholm, Sweden. The Czech Republic, Finland, Sweden, Russia and Canada played a round-robin for a total of four games per team and 10 games in total. Five of the matches were played in the Globen in Stockholm, Sweden, and one match in the Aréna Pardubice in Pardubice, Czech Republic. The tournament was won by Sweden. The tournament was part of 1999–2000 Euro Hockey Tour.

Games against Canada was not included in the 1999–2000 Euro Hockey Tour.

== Standings ==
Pos	Team	Pld	W	D	L	GF	GA	GD	Pts
1	Finland	4	3	0	1	10	6	+4	9
2	Czech Republic	4	3	0	1	11	6	+5	9
3	Canada	4	2	1	1	8	7	+1	7
4	Russia	4	1	0	3	9	14	−5	3
5	Sweden	4	0	1	3	5	10	−5	1

Source: swehockey

== Games ==
All times are local. Stockholm – (Central European Time – UTC+1)

8 February 2000; 15:30	Czech Republic	6-2 (0-1, 1-1, 5-0)	Russia	Attendance: 692

Game reference

Dušan Salfický
Goalies
Yegor Podomatsky
Referee:
(Sweden) Thomas Andersson
Linesmen:
(Sweden) Karlberg
(Sweden) Leo Takula

	0-1	01:00 – Yakubov (Shargorodsky)
Dopita (Špaňhel, Sedlák) – 22:00	1-1
	1-2	40:00 – Khavanov (Kudashov)
Procházka (Martínek) – 42:00	2-2
Burger (Havlát) – 42:00	3-2
Vykoukal (Vlasák) – 48:00	4-2
Patera (Ujčík) – 54:00	5-2
Vlasák (Patera) – 59:00	6-2

20 min
Penalties
14 min

8 February 2000; 19:00	Canada	2-2 (1-0, 1-1, 0-1)	Sweden	Globen, Stockholm; Attendance: 10,932

Game reference

Jamie Ram
Goalies
Petter Rönnquist
Referee:
(Germany) Willi Schimm
Linesmen:
(Sweden) Ulf Lindgren
(Sweden) Kent Thudén

Bergeron (McTavish]) – 02:00	1-0
Lindberg (Parks) – 25:00	2-0
	2-1	29:00 – M.Johansson (Mikael Johansson, Åkerström)
	2-2	55:00 – Sandström (Falk, Thomas Johansson)

14 min
Penalties
8 min

9 February 2000; 19:00	Finland	3-1 (3-0, 0-0, 0-1)	Czech Republic	Globen, Stockholm; Attendance: 2,939

Game reference

Ari Sulander
Goalies
Roman Čechmánek
Referee:
(Germany) Willi Schimm
Linesmen:
(Sweden) Kent Thudén
(Sweden) Svensson

Hentunen (Pärssinen, Nummelin) – 16:00	1-0
Ojanen (Riihijärvi) – 17:00	2-0
Viitakoski (Tikkanen) – 20:00	3-0
	3-1	51:00 – Havlát

4 min
Penalties
6 min

10 February 2000; 15:30	Finland	2-3 (0-0, 1-2, 1-1)	Canada	Globen, Stockholm; Attendance: 1,843

Game reference

Vesa Toskala
Goalies
Jamie Ram
Referee:
(Sweden) Christer Lärking
Linesmen:
(Sweden) Ulf Lindgren
(Sweden) Svensson

	0-1	23:00 – Savoia (Gage)
	0-2	30:00 – Lindberg (Parks, Gordon)
Törmänen (Nieminen) – 36:00	1-2
Törmänen (Grönvall) – 49:00	2-2
	2-3	52:00 – Lindberg (Parks)

10 min
Penalties
12 min

10 February 2000; 19:00	Sweden	2-3 (0-3, 1-0, 1-0)	Russia	Globen, Stockholm; Attendance: 10,014

Game reference

Andreas Hadelöv
Goalies
Yegor Podomatsky
Referee:
(Finland) Pekka Haajanen
Linesmen:
(Sweden) Kent Thudén
(Sweden) Karlberg

	0-1	03:00 – Sushinsky (Yakubov, Zatonsky)
	0-2	05:00 – Vlasenkov
	0-3	20:00 – Zatonsky (Sushinsky)
Sandström (Carnbäck) – 33:00	1-3
Påhlsson (Wernblom) – 59:00	2-3

12 min
Penalties
18 min

11 February 2000; 19:00	Czech Republic	1-0 (0-0, 0-0, 1-0)	Canada	Globen, Stockholm; Attendance: 3,102

Game reference
Dušan Salfický	Goalies	Jamie Ram	Referee: (Finland) Pekka Haajanen; Linesmen: (Sweden) Pehr Claesson (Sweden) Karlsson
Ujčík (Patera) – 46:00 / 1-0			Referee: (Finland) Pekka Haajanen; Linesmen: (Sweden) Pehr Claesson (Sweden) Karlsson
10 min	Penalties	14 min	Referee: (Finland) Pekka Haajanen; Linesmen: (Sweden) Pehr Claesson (Sweden) Karlsson

12 February 2000; 12:00	Russia	2-3 (0-0, 1-0, 1-3)	Finland	Globen, Stockholm; Attendance: 5,131

Game reference

Yegor Podomatsky
Goalies
Ari Sulander
Referee:
(Sweden) Thomas Andersson
Linesmen:
(Sweden) Pehr Claesson
(Sweden) Ulf Lindgren

Vlasenkov (Prokopiev) – 24:00	1-0
	1-1	42:00 – Sihvonen (Tuulola, Törmänen)
	1-2	44:00 – Tuulola (Nieminen, Sihvonen)
Akhmetov (Vlasenkov, Prokopiev) – 56:00	2-2
	2-3	58:00 – Kakko (Varis)

12 min
Penalties
12 min

12 February 2000; 15:30	Czech Republic	3-1 (1-0, 2-0, 0-1)	Sweden	Globen, Stockholm; Attendance: 13,850

Game reference

Roman Čechmánek
Goalies
Petter Rönnquist
Referee:
(Russia) Sergei Karabanov
Linesmen:
(Sweden) Petter Norman
(Sweden) Svensson

Sedlák (Špaňhel, Tesařík) – 05:00	1-0
Dopita (Sedlák) – 31:00	2-0
Vykoukal (Pletka) – 34:00	3-0
	3-1	59:00 – Rönnqvist (Gahn, Nordström)

16 min
Penalties
16 min

13 February 2000; 13:00	Canada	3-2 (1-1, 2-0, 0-1)	Russia	Globen, Stockholm; Attendance: 4,449

Game reference

Joaquin Gage
Goalies
Yegor Podomatsky
Referee:
(Sweden) Thomas Andersson
Linesmen:
(Sweden) Petter Norman
(Sweden) Svensson

Savoia (McTavish) – 08:00	1-0
	1-1	08:00 – Koznev
Bergeron (McTavish) – 30:00	2-1
Bright (Parks) – 34:00	3-1
	3-2	54:00 – Zhdan (Koznev)

10 min
Penalties
10 min

13 February 2000; 17:00	Sweden	0-2 (0-2, 0-0, 0-0)	Finland	Globen, Stockholm; Attendance: 13,850

Game reference
Andreas Hadelöv	Goalies	Vesa Toskala	Referee: (Russia) Sergei Karabanov; Linesmen: (Sweden) Ulf Lindgren (Sweden) Kent Thudén
0-1 / 09:00 – Kapanen (Lydman); 0-2 / 16:00 – Nieminen (Sihvonen)			Referee: (Russia) Sergei Karabanov; Linesmen: (Sweden) Ulf Lindgren (Sweden) Kent Thudén
12 min	Penalties	8 min	Referee: (Russia) Sergei Karabanov; Linesmen: (Sweden) Ulf Lindgren (Sweden) Kent Thudén

== Scoring leaders ==
Pos	Player	Country	GP	G	A	Pts	+/−	PIM	POS
1	Chris Lindberg	Canada	4	3	0	3	+2	0	F
2	Dmitri Vlasenkov	Russia	4	2	1	3	+2	0	F
3	Antti Törmänen	Finland	4	2	1	3	+5	4	F
4	Toni Sihvonen	Finland	4	1	2	3	+4	0	F
5	Mika Nieminen	Finland	4	1	1	3	+3	0	F

GP = Games played; G = Goals; A = Assists; Pts = Points; +/− = Plus/minus; PIM = Penalties in minutes; POS = Position
Source: swehockey

== Goaltending leaders ==
Pos	Player	Country	TOI	GA	GAA	Sv%	SO
1	Dušan Salfický	Czech Republic	120:00	2	1.00	95.92	1
2	Jamie Ram	Canada	119:10	3	1.51	95.52	0
3	Roman Čechmánek	Czech Republic	120:00	4	2.00	94.03	0
4	Joaquin Gage	Canada	120:00	4	2.00	93.55	0
5	Ari Sulander	Finland	120:00	3	1.50	93.33	0
6	Vesa Toskala	Finland	118:51	3	1.51	92.31	1
7	Andreas Hadelöv	Sweden	115:59	5	2.59	90.20	0
8	Yegor Podomatsky	Russia	213:20	12	3.38	87.76	0
9	Petter Rönnquist	Sweden	120:00	5	2.50	86.11	0

TOI = Time on ice (minutes:seconds); SA = Shots against; GA = Goals against; GAA = Goals Against Average; Sv% = Save percentage; SO = Shutouts
Source: swehockey

== Tournament awards ==
The tournament directorate named the following players in the tournament 2000:

- Best goalkeeper: (Canada) Joaquin Gage
- Best defenceman: (Finland) Petteri Nummelin
- Best forward: (Finland) Niko Kapanen

Media All-Star Team:

- Goaltender: (Czech Republic) Roman Čechmánek
- Defence: (Finland) Petteri Nummelin, (Finland) Marko Tuulola
- Forwards: (Canada) Chris Lindberg, (Czech Republic) Pavel Patera, (Russia) Dmitri Vlasenkov
