= 1999 Baltika Cup =

Tournament details
- Host country: Russia
- City: Moscow
- Venue: 1 (in 1 host city)
- Dates: 16–21 December 1999
- Teams: 5

Final positions
- Champions: Russia (6th title)
- Runners-up: Czech Republic
- Third place: Finland
- Fourth place: Sweden

Tournament statistics
- Games played: 10
- Goals scored: 51 (5.1 per game)
- Attendance: 45,500 (4,550 per game)
- Scoring leader: (Russia) Maxim Sushinsky (5 points)

Awards
- MVP: (Russia) Yegor Podomatsky

The 1999 Baltika Cup was played between 16 and 21 December 1999. The Czech Republic, Finland, Sweden and Russia played a round-robin for a total of three games per team and six games in total. All of the matches were played in Luzhniki Palace of Sports in Moscow, Russia. Russia won the tournament. The tournament was part of the 1999–2000 Euro Hockey Tour.

Games against Canada was not included in the 1999–2000 Euro Hockey Tour.

== Standings ==
Pos	Team	Pld	W	D	L	GF	GA	GD	Pts
1	Russia	4	3	1	0	19	10	+9	10
2	Czech Republic	4	2	1	1	10	6	+4	7
3	Finland	4	1	2	1	7	9	−2	5
4	Sweden	4	1	1	2	9	9	0	4
5	Canada	4	0	1	3	6	20	−14	1

Source: swehockey

== Games ==
All times are local. Moscow – (Moscow Time – UTC+4)

16 December 1999; 13:00	Czech Republic	2-0 (0-0, 2-0, 0-0)	Sweden	Luzhniki Palace of Sports, Moscow; Attendance: 1,500

Game reference
Roman Čechmánek	Goalies	Petter Rönnquist
Vlasák (Ujčík, Patera) – 26:06 / 1-0; Šimíček (Štěpánek) – 39:36 / 2-0
8 min	Penalties	8 min
17	Shots	32

16 December 1999; 16:30	Russia	8-2 (2-1, 4-0, 2-1)	Canada	Luzhniki Palace of Sports, Moscow; Attendance: 9,500

Game reference

Maxim Sokolov
Goalies
Joaquin Gage
Referee:
(Sweden) Andersson
Linesmen:
(Russia) Sergei Kulakov
(Russia) Kimich

Arkhipov (Kudashov) – 16:00	1-0
	1-1	15:00 – Mougenel
Dobryshkin (Arkhipov) – 19:00	2-1
Markov (Kuvaldin, Kharitonov) – 24:00	3-1
Petrenko – 25:00	4-1
Markov (Karpov) – 28:00	5-1
Kuvaldin (Kharitonov, Prokopyev) – 31:00	6-1
Kuvaldin (Kharitonov) – 50:00	7-1
Khavanov (Sushinsky) – 52:00	8-1
	8-2	60:00 – Ulmer (Allen)

16 min
Penalties
22 min

17 December 1999; 13:00	Finland	3-1 (2-0, 1-0, 0-1)	Czech Republic	Luzhniki Palace of Sports, Moscow; Attendance: 1,100

Game reference

Pasi Nurminen
Goalies
Dušan Salfický
Referee:
(Russia) Alexander Zaitsev

Ikonen (Sarela) – 02:26	1-0
Ikonen (Sarela) – 12:48	2-0
Hentunen (Kapanen) – 23:40	3-0
	3-1	47:53 – Čajánek (Patera)

20 min
Penalties
26 min
26
Shots
28

17 December 1999; 16:30	Canada	0-4 (0-2, 0-1, 0-1)	Sweden	Luzhniki Palace of Sports, Moscow; Attendance: 1,300

Game reference

Jamie Ram
Goalies
Joakim Lundström
Referee:
(Russia) Valentin Kozin
Linesmen:
(Russia) Alexander Zaitsev
(Russia) Vasilev

0-1	04:33 – Ahlström (Nord) (PP)
0-2	17:57 – Andersson (Sundblad, Larsson)
0-3	30:59 – Huselius (Johansson, Nord) (PP)
0-4	59:40 – Esbjörs (Nordfeldt)

26 min
Penalties
14 min
8
Shots
29

18 December 1999; 16:30	Finland	2-3 (1-1, 1-2, 0-0)	Russia	Luzhniki Palace of Sports, Moscow; Attendance: 9,000

Game reference

Jussi Markkanen
Goalies
Yegor Podomatsky
Referee:
(Czech Republic) Balej
Linesmen:
(Russia) Khimikh
(Russia) Sergei Kulakov

Pärssinen (Hentunen) – 01:00	1-0
	1-1	16:00 – Khavanov (Markov)
Saarela (Viitakoski) – 27:00	2-1
	2-2	26:00 – Gusmanov (Karpov)
	2-3	35:0 – Vlasenkov (Dobryshkin)

14 min
Penalties
10 min

19 December 1999; 16:30	Russia	1-1 (0-1, 0-0, 1-0)	Czech Republic	Luzhniki Palace of Sports, Moscow; Attendance: 9,500

Game reference
Yegor Podomatsky	Goalies	Roman Čechmánek	Referee: (Sweden) Andersson; Linesmen: (Russia) Vasilev (Russia) Alexander Zaitsev
/ 0-1 / 18:00 – Benýšek (Čajánek); Petrochinin (Sushinsky) – 46:00 / 1-1			Referee: (Sweden) Andersson; Linesmen: (Russia) Vasilev (Russia) Alexander Zaitsev
14 min	Penalties	10 min	Referee: (Sweden) Andersson; Linesmen: (Russia) Vasilev (Russia) Alexander Zaitsev

20 December 1999; 13:00	Czech Republic	6-2 (2-1, 3-0, 1-1)	Canada	Luzhniki Palace of Sports, Moscow; Attendance: 1,000

Game reference

Dušan Salfický
Goalies
Joaquin Gage
Referee:
(Russia) Alexander Zaitsev
Linesmen:
(Russia) Biryukov
(Russia) Khimikh

	0-1	05:00 – Diduck (Johnson, Norris)
Špaňhel (Kořínek) – 13:00	1-1
Výborný (Kučera) – 17:00	2-1
Vykoukal (Pletka, Reichel) – 38:00	3-1
Špaňhel (Zábranský, Štěpánek) – 39:00	4-1
Kořínek (Výborný) – 40:00	5-1
Moravec – 49:00	6-1
	6-2	50:00 – Diduck (Savoia)

14 min
Penalties
14 min

20 December 1999; 16:30	Sweden	0-0 (0-0, 0-0, 0-0)	Finland	Luzhniki Palace of Sports, Moscow; Attendance: 1,500

Game reference
Joakim Lundström	Goalies	Pasi Nurminen	Referee: (Russia) Valentin Kozin; Linesmen: (Russia) Alexander Zaitsev (Russia) Vasilev
4 min	Penalties	6 min	Referee: (Russia) Valentin Kozin; Linesmen: (Russia) Alexander Zaitsev (Russia) Vasilev

21 December 1999; 13:00	Canada	2-2 (1-1, 0-0, 1-1)	Finland	Luzhniki Palace of Sports, Moscow; Attendance: 1,100

Game reference

Jamie Ram
Goalies
Jussi Markkanen
Referee:
(Russia) Karabanov
Linesmen:
(Russia) Biryukov
(Russia) Vasilev

Stonier (Boisvert) – 13:00	1-0
Simpson (Savoia) – 17:00	2-0
	2-1	19:00 – Kakko (Lydman, Kapanen)
	2-2	50:00 – Hentunen (Pärssinen, Markkanen)

16 min
Penalties
4 min

21 December 1999; 16:30	Sweden	5-7 (4-3, 1-2, 0-2)	Russia	Luzhniki Palace of Sports, Moscow; Attendance: 10,000

Game reference

Referees:
(Czech Republic) Jiri Balej
(Russia) Alexander Zjajtsev

	0-1	03:34 – Kharitonov (Prokopyev) (PP)
Gahn (Ekelund , Ahlström) – 04:09	1-1
	1-2	08:21 – Arkhipov (Vlasenkov, Dobryshkin)
Johansson (Huselius, Tjärnqvist) – 10:56	2-2
Huselius (Johansson) – 13:43	3-2
Johansson (Tjärnqvist) – 15:12	4-2
	4-3	19:58 – Markov (Vlasenkov, Bautin)
	4-4	21:14 – Kudashov (Sushinsky)
Huselius (Johansson) – 31:59	5-4
	5-5	38:54 – Petrochinin (Shargorodsky, Kudashov) (PP)
	5-6	41:31 – Sushinsky (Koznev, Kudashov)
	5-7	51:04 – Karpov (Shargorodsky, Sushinsky)

38 min
Penalties
24 min
26
Shots
29

== Scoring leaders ==
Pos	Player	Country	GP	G	A	Pts	+/−	PIM	POS
1	Maxim Sushinsky	Russia	4	1	4	5	+1	8	F
2	Kristian Huselius	Sweden	4	4	0	4	0	0	F
3	Andrei Markov	Russia	4	3	1	4	+4	2	D
3	Alexander Kharitonov	Russia	4	1	3	4	+3	0	F
5	Alexei Kudashov	Russia	4	1	3	4	+3	0	F

GP = Games played; G = Goals; A = Assists; Pts = Points; +/− = Plus/minus; PIM = Penalties in minutes; POS = Position
Source: quanthockey

== Tournament awards ==
The tournament directorate named the following players in the tournament 1999:

- Best goaltender: (Czech Republic) Roman Čechmánek
- Best defenceman: (Sweden) Peter Andersson
- Best forward: (Finland) Juha Ikonen
- Most Valuable Player: (Russia) Yegor Podomatsky
