= 2002 IIHF World Championship rosters =

Rosters at the 2002 IIHF World Championship in Sweden.

== Legend ==
Number	Uniform number	GP	Games played	SO	Shutouts
F	Forward	G	Goals	SV%	Save percentage
D	Defenceman	A	Assists	Min	Minutes played
GK	Goaltender	Pts	Points	GA	Goals against
Club	Player's club before tournament	PIM	Penalties in minutes	GAA	Goals against average

== Canada ==
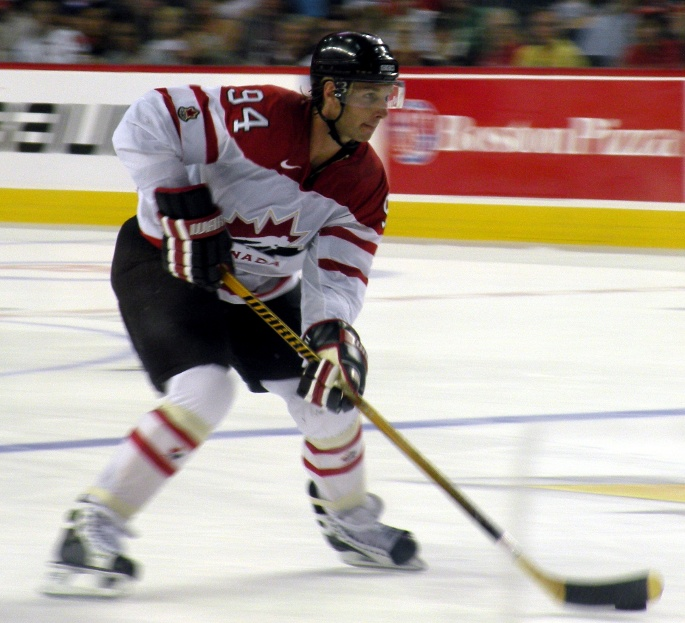
Ryan Smyth tied for the Team Canada lead with 4 goals

- Head coach: Wayne Fleming

=== Skaters ===
Number	Position	Player	Club	GP	G	A	Pts	PIM
2	D	Eric Brewer	Edmonton Oilers	7	2	3	5	4
32	F	Kyle Calder	Chicago Blackhawks	3	0	0	0	0
7	F	Daniel Cleary	Edmonton Oilers	7	2	1	3	2
89	F	Mike Comrie	Edmonton Oilers	7	1	2	3	10
45	D	Brad Ference	Florida Panthers	6	0	0	0	4
15	F	Dany Heatley	Atlanta Thrashers	7	2	2	4	2
27	F	Manny Malhotra	Dallas Stars	7	0	0	0	4
24	D	Richard Matvichuk	Dallas Stars	7	1	0	1	6
19	F	Andy McDonald	Mighty Ducks of Anaheim	7	4	1	5	0
33	D	Dan McGillis	Philadelphia Flyers	5	0	1	1	2
10	F	Brenden Morrow	Dallas Stars	7	0	1	1	2
3	D	James Patrick	Buffalo Sabres	7	0	2	2	0
72	F	Peter Schaefer	TPS Turku	7	0	1	1	2
22	D	Brad Schlegel	Kölner Haie	7	1	0	1	4
94	F	Ryan Smyth	Edmonton Oilers	7	4	0	4	2
4	D	Steve Staios	Edmonton Oilers	6	1	0	1	4
5	D	Darryl Sydor	Dallas Stars	1	0	0	0	0
14	F	Ray Whitney	Columbus Blue Jackets	7	1	3	4	2
41	F	Justin Williams	Philadelphia Flyers	5	0	3	3	6
18	F	Jamie Wright	Calgary Flames	7	1	1	2	2
28	F	Tyler Wright	Columbus Blue Jackets	7	0	2	2	33

=== Goaltenders ===
Number	Player	Club	GP	Min	GA	GAA	SV%	SO
35	Jean-Sebastien Giguere	Mighty Ducks of Anaheim	5	253:43	8	1.89	0.920	0
30	Jamie Ram	Jokerit	–	–	–	–	–	–
29	Jamie Storr	Los Angeles Kings	–	–	–	–	–	–
1	Marty Turco	Dallas Stars	3	165:31	5	1.81	0.934	1

Source: IIHF.

== Czech Republic ==
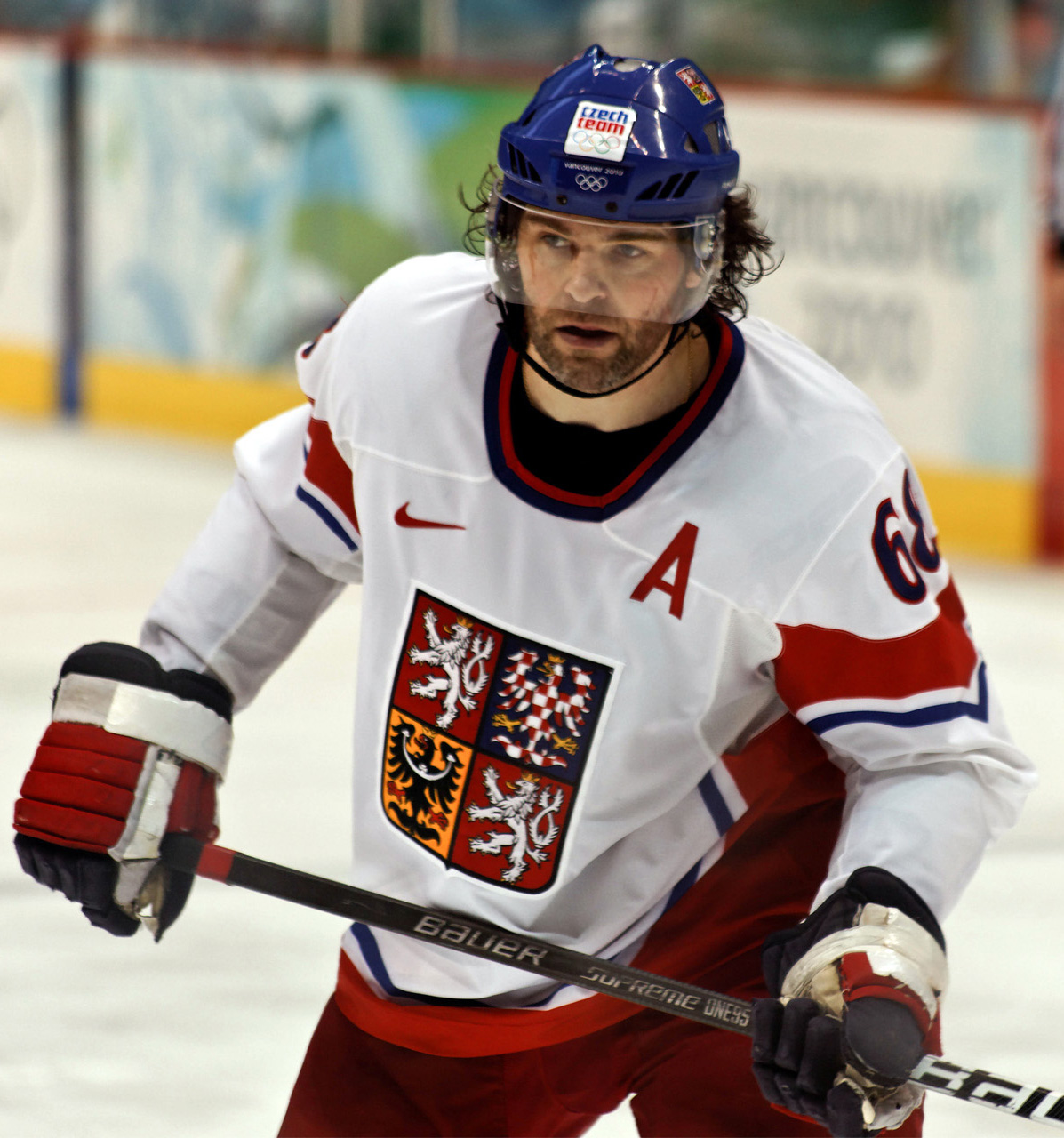
Jaromír Jágr led the Czech Republic in points.

- Head coach: Josef Augusta

=== Skaters ===
Number	Position	Player	Club	GP	G	A	Pts	PIM
36	F	Michal Broš	HC Sparta Praha	7	0	2	2	4
16	F	Petr Čajánek	HC Continental Zlín	7	3	2	5	2
17	F	Jaroslav Hlinka	HC Sparta Praha	7	1	5	6	2
38	F	Jan Hrdina	Pittsburgh Penguins	7	2	1	3	12
68	F	Jaromír Jágr	Washington Capitals	7	4	4	8	2
12	D	František Kaberle	Atlanta Thrashers	7	1	0	1	0
44	D	Rostislav Klesla	Columbus Blue Jackets	7	1	2	3	2
18	F	Ondřej Kratěna	HC Sparta Praha	5	0	0	0	0
8	D	Filip Kuba	Minnesota Wild	7	0	3	3	18
13	D	Pavel Kubina	Tampa Bay Lightning	7	3	4	7	8
22	F	David Moravec	HC Vítkovice	7	1	2	3	2
10	F	Pavel Patera	Avangard Omsk	7	2	3	5	4
20	F	Martin Procházka	Avangard Omsk	7	4	3	7	0
23	F	Zdeněk Sedlák	HC Keramika Plzeň	7	1	0	1	2
6	D	Jaroslav Špaček	Columbus Blue Jackets	7	1	2	3	8
29	D	Michal Sýkora	HC Pardubice	7	1	2	3	12
5	D	Martin Richter	HC Sparta Praha	6	0	0	0	0
11	F	Viktor Ujčík	HC Slavia Praha	7	2	2	4	2
26	F	Tomáš Vlasák	HC Ambri-Piotta	7	3	3	6	0
9	F	David Výborný	Columbus Blue Jackets	7	1	3	4	16

=== Goaltenders ===
Number	Player	Club	GP	Min	GA	GAA	SV%	SO
3	Milan Hnilička	Atlanta Thrashers	5	298:46	9	1.81	.917	1
72	Dušan Salfický	HC Pardubice	–	–	–	–	–	–
35	Jiří Trvaj	HC Vítkovice	2	120:00	8	4.00	.833	0

Source: IIHF.

== Finland ==
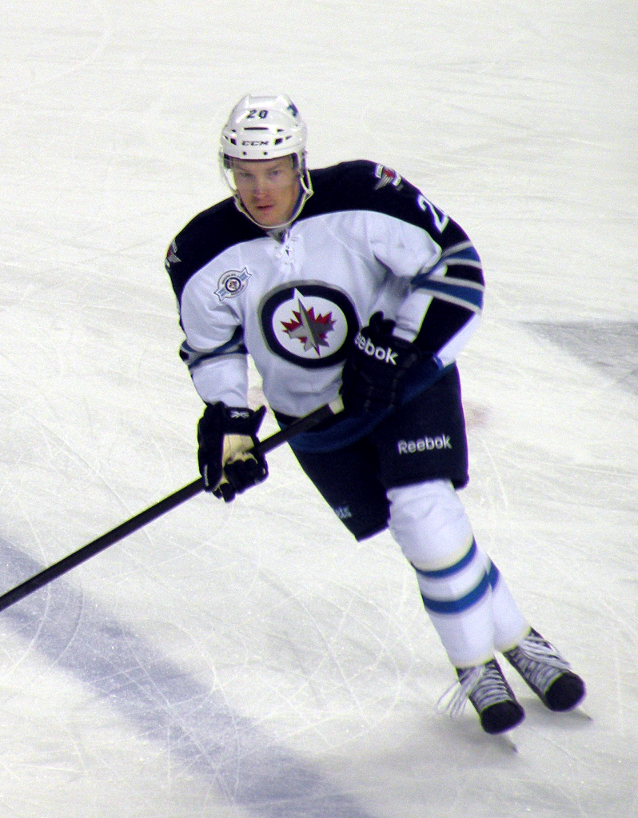
Antti Miettinen was Finland's third leading point producer

- Head coach: Hannu Aravirta

=== Skaters ===
Number	Position	Player	Club	GP	G	A	Pts	PIM
41	F	Antti Aalto	Jokerit	9	1	0	1	16
10	F	Niklas Hagman	Florida Panthers	9	5	2	7	2
14	F	Raimo Helminen	Ilves	9	0	2	2	2
12	F	Olli Jokinen	Florida Panthers	9	1	1	2	4
17	F	Tomi Kallio	Atlanta Thrashers	9	3	2	5	6
21	F	Niko Kapanen	Utah Grizzlies	9	0	4	4	10
13	D	Jere Karalahti	Nashville Predators	9	2	3	5	10
6	D	Tom Koivisto	Jokerit	9	2	1	3	4
27	F	Juha Lind	Södertälje SK	9	0	1	1	2
9	D	Toni Lydman	Calgary Flames	9	1	1	2	10
20	F	Antti Miettinen	HPK	9	2	4	6	4
44	D	Janne Niinimaa	Edmonton Oilers	9	0	4	4	8
3	D	Petteri Nummelin	HC Lugano	7	1	0	1	2
8	F	Janne Ojanen	Tappara	9	2	2	4	8
29	F	Timo Pärssinen	Mighty Ducks of Anaheim	9	3	5	8	4
56	F	Lasse Pirjetä	Kärpät	7	0	0	0	0
32	F	Kimmo Rintanen	Kloten Flyers	9	2	2	4	2
4	D	Kimmo Timonen	Nashville Predators	9	1	2	3	8
36	D	Marko Tuulola	HPK	9	1	1	2	0
39	F	Vesa Viitakoski	Ilves	9	1	1	2	2

=== Goaltenders ===
Number	Player	Club	GP	Min	GA	GAA	SV%	SO
33	Kari Lehtonen	Jokerit	–	–	–	–	–	–
30	Jussi Markkanen	Edmonton Oilers	7	429:42	10	1.40	.937	2
19	Fredrik Norrena	TPS	2	119:36	4	2.01	.920	1

Source: IIHF.

== Russia ==
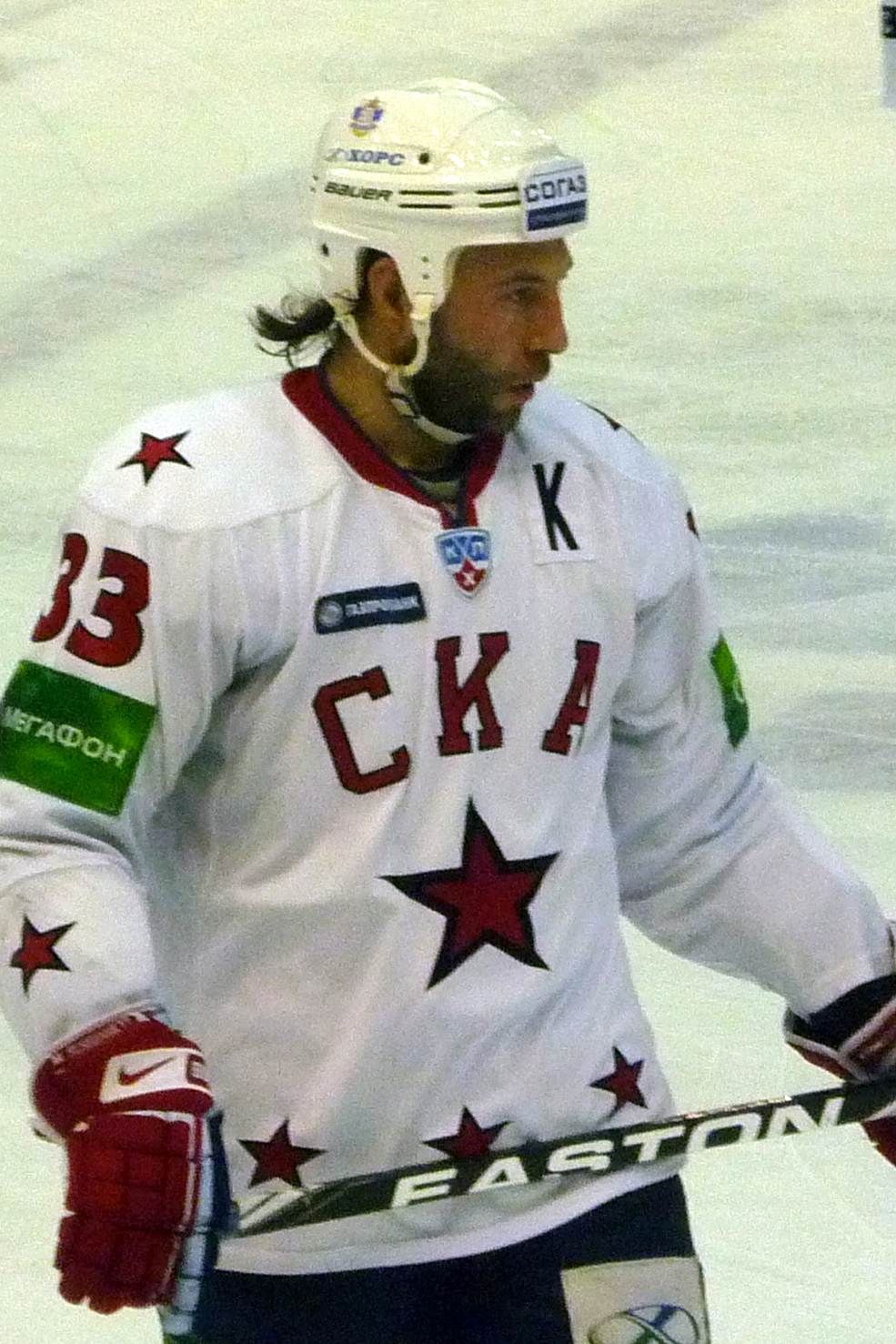
Maxim Sushinsky tied for the team lead with 7 points

- Head coach: Boris Mikhailov

=== Skaters ===
vlevo
Number	Position	Player	Club	GP	G	A	Pts	PIM
61	F	Maxim Afinogenov	Buffalo Sabres	9	3	0	3	6
24	F	Vladimir Antipov	Lokomotiv Yaroslavl	9	1	2	3	2
26	F	Vyacheslav Butsayev	Lokomotiv Yaroslavl	9	1	2	3	6
5	D	Dmitri Bykov	Ak Bars Kazan	5	3	1	4	2
8	D	Sergei Gusev	Severstal Cherepovets	3	0	0	0	0
7	D	Alexander Guskov	Lokomotiv Yaroslavl	9	0	1	1	6
27	F	Ravil Gusmanov	Metallurg Magnitogorsk	7	3	0	3	8
45	D	Dmitri Kalinin	Buffalo Sabres	9	0	1	1	4
44	F	Valeri Karpov	Metallurg Magnitogorsk	9	4	2	6	22
51	F	Andrei Kovalenko	Lokomotiv Yaroslavl	8	0	4	4	4
9	F	Alexei Koznev	Avangard Omsk	9	3	2	5	6
29	F	Roman Lyashenko	New York Rangers	9	0	2	2	14
23	F	Alexander Prokopiev	Avangard Omsk	9	3	4	7	18
13	F	Andrei Razin	HC Dynamo Moscow	–	–	–	–	–
11	D	Dmitri Ryabykin	Avangard Omsk	9	0	3	3	2
21	F	Alexander Savchenkov	HC Dynamo Moscow	2	0	0	0	2
33	F	Maxim Sushinski	Avangard Omsk	9	3	4	7	4
15	F	Ivan Tkachenko	Lokomotiv Yaroslavl	9	3	2	5	2
6	D	Anton Volchenkov	PHC Krylya Sovetov	9	0	0	0	0
4	D	Sergei Vyshedkevich	HC Dynamo Moscow	9	0	0	0	8
2	D	Alexander Yudin	HC Neftekhimik Nizhnekamsk	9	0	0	0	6
10	F	Dmitry Zatonsky	Avangard Omsk	9	2	3	5	22
25	D	Sergei Zhukov	Lokomotiv Yaroslavl	9	1	2	3	0

=== Goaltenders ===
Number	Player	Club	GP	Min	GA	GAA	SV%	SO
30	Victor Chistov	Severstal Cherepovets	–	–	–	–	–	–
31	Yegor Podomatsky	Lokomotiv Yaroslavl	5	258:09	12	2.79	0.906	0
39	Maxim Sokolov	Severstal Cherepovets	5	291:05	11	2.27	0.934	0

Source: IIHF.

== Slovakia ==
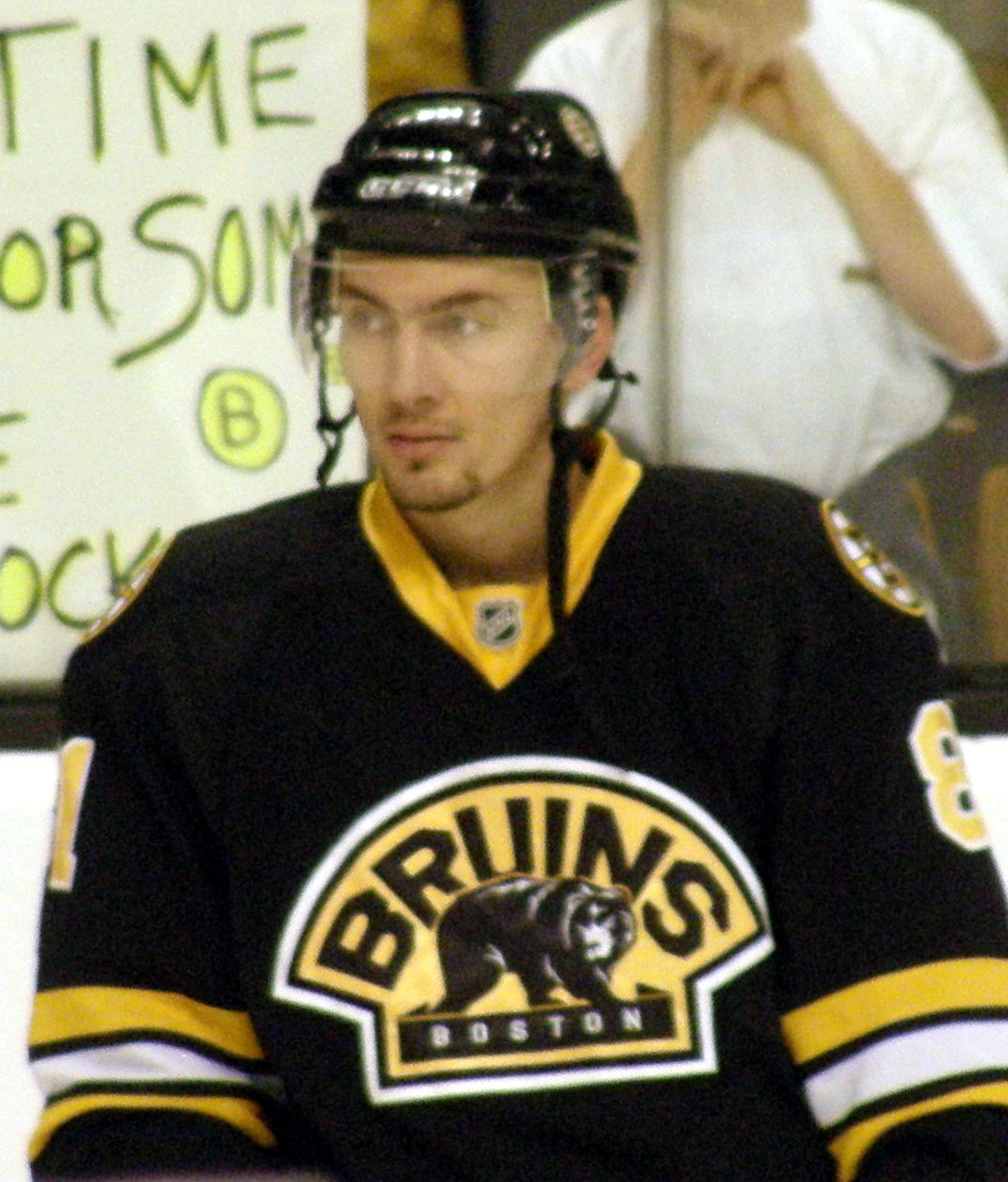
Miroslav Šatan led Slovakia in points with 13

- Head coach: Ján Filc

=== Skaters ===
vlevo
Number	Position	Player	Club	GP	G	A	Pts	PIM
4	D	Jerguš Bača	Revierlöwen Oberhausen	9	0	1	1	10
23	F	Ľuboš Bartečko	Atlanta Thrashers	9	2	2	4	2
12	F	Peter Bondra	Washington Capitals	9	7	2	9	20
74	D	Ladislav Čierny	HKm Zvolen	9	1	0	1	8
26	F	Michal Handzuš	Phoenix Coyotes	6	1	4	5	4
2	D	Radoslav Hecl	Slovan Bratislava	3	0	0	0	0
30	F	Miroslav Hlinka	Modo Hockey	9	1	1	2	6
41	D	Richard Lintner	Modo Hockey	9	4	4	8	22
11	D	Dusan Milo	HKm Zvolen	9	3	2	5	4
27	F	Ladislav Nagy	Phoenix Coyotes	6	1	3	4	6
16	F	Vladimír Országh	Nashville Predators	9	3	1	4	12
24	F	Žigmund Pálffy	Los Angeles Kings	3	1	6	7	2
19	F	Rastislav Pavlikovský	HV71	9	2	4	6	14
39	F	Róbert Petrovický	HC Ambri-Piotta	9	1	1	2	4
33	F	Peter Pucher	HC Znojemští Orli	6	0	2	2	4
18	F	Miroslav Šatan	Buffalo Sabres	9	5	8	13	2
8	D	Peter Smrek	Nashville Predators	9	0	0	0	8
21	F	Radovan Somík	HC Zlín	9	0	3	3	2
7	D	Martin Štrbák	Lokomotiv Yaroslavl	9	0	2	2	10
15	F	Jozef Stümpel	Boston Bruins	3	0	1	1	4
44	F	Róbert Tomík	HC Sparta Praha	6	3	0	3	0
79	F	Marek Uram	HC Znojemští Orli	6	0	0	0	0
17	D	Ľubomír Višňovský	Los Angeles Kings	5	2	1	3	2

=== Goaltenders ===
Number	Player	Club	GP	Min	GA	GAA	SV%	SO
25	Ján Lašák	Nashville Predators	6	368:53	14	2.28	0.921	0
1	Miroslav Šimonovič	HC SKP Poprad	–	–	–	–	–	–
31	Rastislav Staňa	Richmond Renegades	3	180:00	8	2.67	0.902	1

Source: IIHF.

== Sweden ==
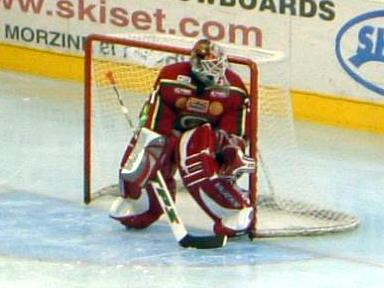
Tommy Salo recorded a 1.96 GAA and a shutout in seven games for Sweden

- Head coach: Hardy Nilsson

=== Skaters ===
vlevo
Number	Position	Player	Club	GP	G	A	Pts	PIM
24	F	Niklas Andersson	Frölunda HC	8	3	2	5	2
11	F	P. J. Axelsson	Boston Bruins	5	3	3	6	4
76	F	Johan Davidsson	HV71	7	1	1	2	2
22	F	Ulf Dahlén	Washington Capitals	9	5	2	7	0
16	F	Nichlas Falk	Djurgårdens IF	6	1	1	2	6
7	D	Per Gustafsson	HV71	–	–	–	–	–
3	D	Pierre Hedin	MoDo	9	2	1	3	4
44	F	Kristian Huselius	Florida Panthers	9	5	6	11	0
10	F	Andreas Johansson	New York Rangers	9	1	3	4	18
6	D	Magnus Johansson	Frölunda HC	9	1	0	1	6
17	F	Mathias Johansson	Färjestad BK	9	0	3	3	4
18	D	Thomas Johansson	AIK	9	2	0	2	6
31	F	Jonas Johnson	Frölunda HC	9	1	4	5	2
5	D	Kim Johnsson	Philadelphia Flyers	6	0	1	1	2
21	F	Jörgen Jönsson	Färjestad BK	9	1	3	4	6
19	F	Markus Näslund	Vancouver Canucks	3	1	2	3	0
92	F	Michael Nylander	Vancouver Canucks	8	1	6	7	0
25	D	Thomas Rhodin	Färjestad BK	9	4	1	5	10
23	D	Ronnie Sundin	Frölunda HC	9	2	2	4	4
34	D	Daniel Tjärnqvist	Atlanta Thrashers	9	3	2	5	0
26	F	Mattias Weinhandl	MoDo	9	3	4	7	4
20	F	Henrik Zetterberg	Timra IK	9	0	7	7	4

=== Goaltenders ===
Number	Player	Club	GP	Min	GA	GAA	SV%	SO
1	Stefan Liv	HV71 Jönköping	2	120:00	3	1.50	.903	1
30	Rolf Vanhainen	Södertälje SK	–	–	–	–	–	–
35	Tommy Salo	Edmonton Oilers	7	429:00	14	1.96	.921	1

Source: IIHF.

== United States ==
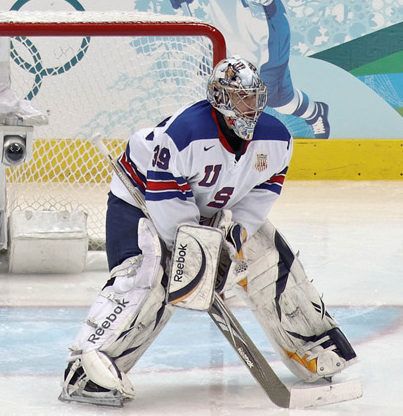
Ryan Miller was Team USA's top goaltender posting a 1.76 goals against average and one shutout

- Head coach: Lou Vairo

=== Skaters ===
Number	Position	Player	Club	GP	G	A	Pts	PIM
17	F	Christopher Clark	Calgary Flames	7	2	0	2	6
8	D	Joshua De Wolf	Cincinnati Mighty Ducks	7	0	0	0	2
21	F	Ted Donato	Manchester Monarchs	7	1	3	4	2
4	D	Mark Eaton	Nashville Predators	7	0	3	3	2
2	D	Derian Hatcher	Dallas Stars	7	0	1	1	0
19	F	Andy Hilbert	Providence Bruins	7	2	1	3	6
22	F	Steve Konowalchuk	Washington Capitals	7	2	1	3	4
33	F	Dan LaCouture	Pittsburgh Penguins	7	2	2	4	0
3	D	Jordan Leopold	University of Minnesota	7	0	1	1	4
10	F	Mark Murphy	Portland Pirates	7	2	0	2	2
16	F	Mark Mowers	Nashville Predators	7	2	0	2	2
27	D	Chris O'Sullivan	Kloten Flyers	7	0	0	0	0
18	F	Richard Park	Minnesota Wild	7	3	3	6	0
62	F	Derek Plante	Munchen Barons	7	2	1	3	2
37	F	Erik Rasmussen	Buffalo Sabres	7	0	1	1	2
11	F	Marty Reasoner	Edmonton Oilers	7	0	1	1	6
7	D	Todd Rohloff	Washington Capitals	7	0	1	1	2
14	F	Joe Sacco	Washington Capitals	7	2	1	3	2
24	D	Chris Tamer	Atlanta Thrashers	7	0	1	1	2
5	D	Eric Weinrich	Philadelphia Flyers	3	0	1	1	2

=== Goaltenders ===
Number	Player	Club	GP	Min	GA	GAA	SV%	SO
34	Dieter Kochan	Tampa Bay Lightning	3	149:26	5	2.01	0.918	0
39	Ryan Miller	Michigan State Spartans	4	238:13	7	1.76	0.946	1
29	Gregg Naumenko	Cincinnati Mighty Ducks	1	29:15	4	8.21	0.733	0

Source: IIHF.
