= Rhett Gordon =

Canadian ice hockey player

- Born: August 26, 1976 (age 49) Regina, Saskatchewan, Canada
- Height: 5 ft 11 in (180 cm)
- Weight: 174 lb (79 kg; 12 st 6 lb)
- Position: Right wing
- Shot: Right
- Played for: Springfield Falcons; Manitoba Moose; Ayr Scottish Eagles; Sheffield Steelers; Herning IK; Iserlohn Roosters; SG Cortina; Rødovre; Augsburger Panther; HC Bolzano; Nottingham Panthers
- NHL draft: Undrafted
- Playing career: 1996–2012

Rhett Gordon (born August 26, 1976) is a Canadian retired professional ice hockey forward who predominantly played his career in Europe, winning the Elite Ice Hockey League title in his last season with the Nottingham Panthers.

== Career statistics ==
			Regular season					Playoffs
Season	Team	League	GP	G	A	Pts	PIM	GP	G	A	Pts	PIM
1992–93	Regina Pats	WHL	2	1	0	1	2	4	0	0	0	0
1993–94	Regina Pats	WHL	60	19	28	47	14	4	0	0	0	7
1994–95	Regina Pats	WHL	71	36	43	79	64	4	2	2	4	0
1995–96	Regina Pats	WHL	66	53	50	103	68	11	9	4	13	10
1995–96	Springfield Falcons	AHL	2	0	0	0	2	1	0	0	0	0
1996–97	Springfield Falcons	AHL	54	11	11	22	54	8	1	2	3	6
1997–98	Springfield Falcons	AHL	75	17	11	28	54	4	1	1	2	0
1998–99	Manitoba Moose	IHL	76	14	23	37	61	5	0	0	0	0
1999–00	Kansas City Blades	IHL	12	1	3	4	0	—	—	—	—	—
1999–00	Canadian National Team	Intl	56	15	26	41	42	—	—	—	—	—
2000–01	Ayr Scottish Eagles	BISL	40	13	18	31	34	7	3	2	5	12
2001–02	Ayr Scottish Eagles	BISL	48	11	19	30	46	7	2	3	5	8
2002–03	Sheffield Steelers	BISL	25	10	12	22	22	1	0	0	0	0
2003–04	Herning IK	DEN	35	23	19	42	142	—	—	—	—	—
2004–05	Iserlohn Roosters	DEL	52	14	17	31	38	—	—	—	—	—
2005–06	SG Cortina	ITL	35	19	22	41	48	5	0	3	3	0
2006–07	Rødovre	DEN	36	20	37	57	94	4	0	0	0	6
2007–08	Augsburger Panther	DEL	49	13	21	34	76	—	—	—	—	—
2008–09	Augsburger Panther	DEL	50	12	33	45	104	4	1	0	1	6
2009–10	Augsburger Panther	DEL	55	12	18	30	70	14	0	6	6	6
2010–11	HC Bolzano	ITL	26	6	12	18	28	7	2	4	6	12
2011–12	Colorado Eagles	ECHL	10	1	4	5	4	—	—	—	—	—
2011–12	Nottingham Panthers	EIHL	17	3	14	17	10	4	1	1	2	0
AHL totals			131	28	22	50	110	13	2	3	5	6
