= Ryan Savoia =

Canadian ice hockey player

- Born: May 6, 1973 (age 51); Thorold, Ontario, Canada
- Height: 6 ft 1 in (185 cm)
- Weight: 205 lb (93 kg; 14 st 9 lb)
- Position: Centre
- Shot: Right
- Played for: Pittsburgh Penguins; HIFK; HC Fribourg-Gottéron; Augsburger Panther; SC Bern; Djurgårdens IF; SC Langnau; Milano Vipers; SG Cortina
- National team: Canada
- NHL draft: Undrafted
- Playing career: 1995–2008

Ryan Savoia (born May 6, 1973) is a Canadian retired professional ice hockey centre. He played 3 games in the National Hockey League with the Pittsburgh Penguins during the 1998–99 season. The rest of his career, which lasted from 1995 to 2008, was spent in the minor leagues and then in Europe.

== Biography ==
Savoia was born in Thorold, Ontario. As a youth, he played in the 1987 Quebec International Pee-Wee Hockey Tournament with a minor ice hockey team from St. Catharines. He later played three games in the National Hockey League for the Pittsburgh Penguins, during the 1998–99 NHL season. Savoia was also a member of the 1999–2000 Canada men's national ice hockey team. He led the team in scoring with 21 goals, 30 assists, and 51 points.

== Career statistics ==
=== Regular season and playoffs ===
			Regular season					Playoffs
Season	Team	League	GP	G	A	Pts	PIM	GP	G	A	Pts	PIM
1989–90	Thorold Eagles	GHL	40	13	16	29	14	—	—	—	—	—
1990–91	Thorold Eagles	GHL	35	13	20	33	28	—	—	—	—	—
1991–92	Thorold Eagles	GHL	41	26	24	50	46	—	—	—	—	—
1992–93	Thorold Eagles	GHL	39	27	41	66	74	—	—	—	—	—
1993–94	Thorold Blackhawks	GHL	39	51	51	102	48	—	—	—	—	—
1994–95	Brock University	CIAU	26	23	32	55	16	12	12	16	28	8
1994–95	Cleveland Lumberjacks	IHL	1	0	0	0	0	—	—	—	—	—
1995–96	Cleveland Lumberjacks	IHL	49	6	7	13	31	—	—	—	—	—
1996–97	Cleveland Lumberjacks	IHL	4	1	0	1	2	—	—	—	—	—
1996–97	Fort Wayne Komets	IHL	8	0	2	2	2	—	—	—	—	—
1996–97	Johnstown Chiefs	ECHL	60	35	44	79	100	—	—	—	—	—
1997–98	HIFK	FIN	1	0	0	0	0	—	—	—	—	—
1997–98	Syracuse Crunch	AHL	7	0	4	4	2	—	—	—	—	—
1997–98	Johnstown Chiefs	ECHL	6	1	5	6	0	—	—	—	—	—
1998–99	Pittsburgh Penguins	NHL	3	0	0	0	0	—	—	—	—	—
1998–99	Syracuse Crunch	AHL	1	0	0	0	0	—	—	—	—	—
1999–00	Canadian National Team	Intl	56	21	30	51	91	—	—	—	—	—
1999–00	HC Fribourg-Gottéron	NLA	—	—	—	—	—	4	1	1	2	0
2000–01	Augsburger Panther	DEL	47	14	16	30	42	—	—	—	—	—
2000–01	SC Bern	NLA	6	2	2	4	2	—	—	—	—	—
2001–02	EHC Biel-Bienne	NLB	36	25	27	52	62	4	3	2	5	4
2002–03	EHC Biel-Bienne	NLB	38	32	29	61	32	10	6	7	13	26
2003–04	Djurgårdens IF	SWE	6	0	0	0	0	—	—	—	—	—
2003–04	SC Langnau	NLA	12	3	4	7	12	—	—	—	—	—
2004–05	SC Langnau	NLA	13	2	1	3	14	—	—	—	—	—
2004–05	Milano Vipers	ITA	22	9	13	22	33	13	3	6	9	37
2005–06	Milano Vipers	ITA	45	17	15	32	30	7	3	3	6	6
2006–07	Milano Vipers	ITA	37	11	21	32	36	9	4	4	8	10
2007–08	SG Cortina	ITA	33	12	14	26	42	7	2	7	9	6
2008–09	Dundas Real McCoys	MLH	1	0	0	0	0	—	—	—	—	—
ITA totals			137	49	63	112	141	36	12	20	32	59
NHL totals			3	0	0	0	0	—	—	—	—	—
