= Yuri Dobryshkin =

Russian ice hockey player (born 1979)

- Born: July 19, 1979 (age 47) Penza, USSR
- Height: 6 ft 0 in (183 cm)
- Weight: 190 lb (86 kg; 13 st 8 lb)
- Position: Right wing
- Shot: Left
- Played for: Krylia Sovetov; AK Bars Kazan; Severstal Cherepovets; Metallurg Magnitogorsk; HC CSKA Moscow; Torpedo Nizhny Novgorod; Atlant Moscow Oblast; HC Dynamo Moscow; Dizel Penza
- National team: Russia
- NHL draft: 159th overall, 1999; Atlanta Thrashers
- Playing career: 1997–2010

Yuri Vladimirovich Dobryshkin (Russian: Юрий Владимирович Добрышкин; born 19 July 1979 in Penza, Soviet Union) is a Russian former professional ice hockey player. He played in the Russian Superleague and the Kontinental Hockey League for Krylia Sovetov, AK Bars Kazan, Severstal Cherepovets, Metallurg Magnitogorsk, HC CSKA Moscow, Torpedo Nizhny Novgorod, Atlant Moscow Oblast and HC Dynamo Moscow. He was selected by Atlanta Thrashers in the 6th round (159th overall) of the 1999 NHL entry draft.
