= Rafik Yakubov =

Russian ice hockey player

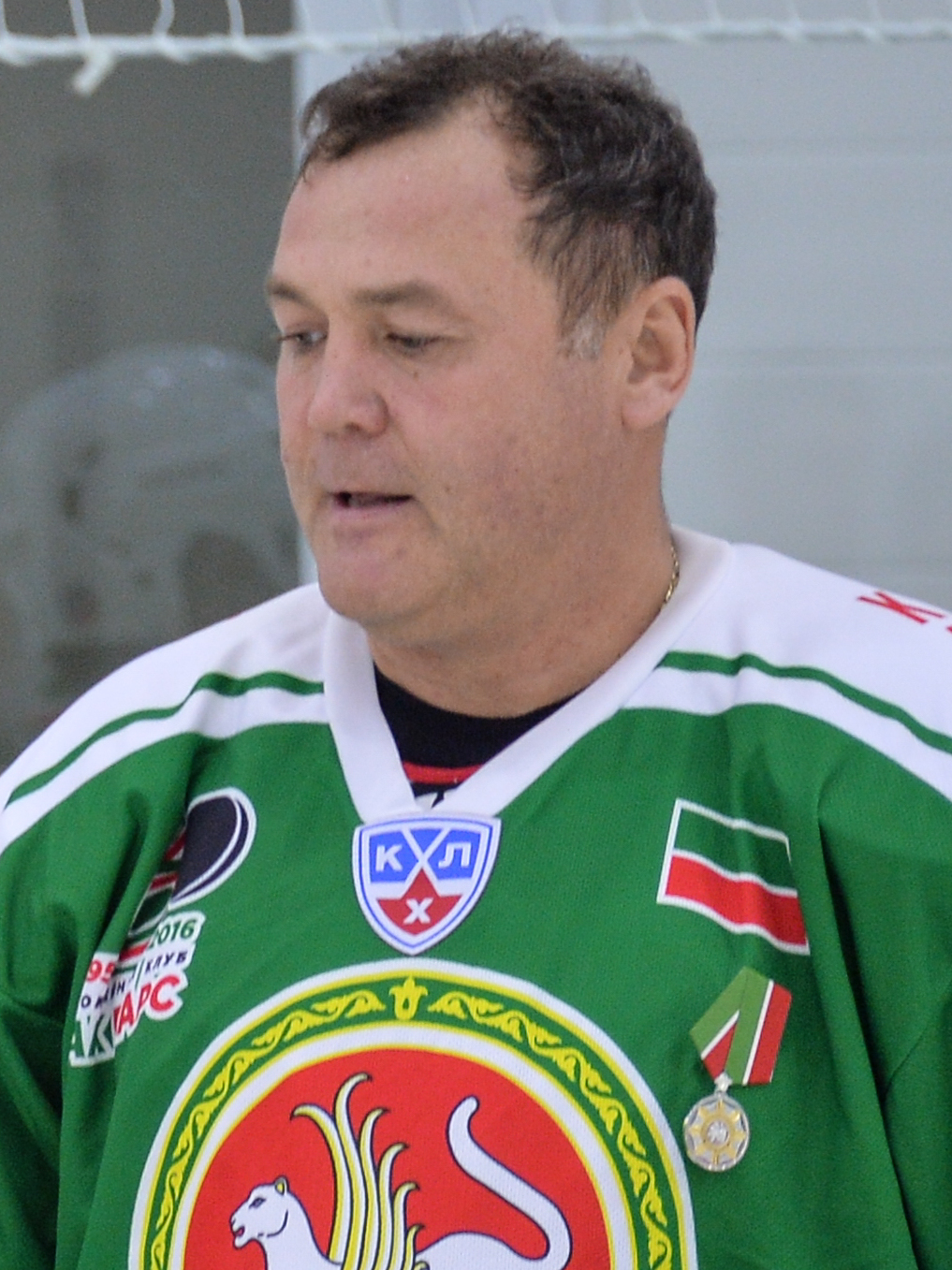
- 2016
- Born: September 14, 1966 (age 59) Kazan, Russian SFSR, Soviet Union
- Height: 5 ft 9 in (175 cm)
- Weight: 181 lb (82 kg; 12 st 13 lb)
- Position: Defence
- Shot: Right
- Played for: SC Uritskogo Kazan; SKA-Sverdlovsk; Itil Kazan; HC Lada Togliatti; Ak Bars Kazan; HC Neftekhimik Nizhnekamsk
- Playing career: 1983–2002

Rafik Yakubov (born September 14, 1966) is a Russian and Soviet former professional ice hockey defenceman, who played for the Russia II (Izvestia Trophy 1993) and the first national team of Russia (Deutschland Cup 1993). After completing his playing career, he became a coach and general manager.

== Career statistics ==
			Regular season					Playoffs
Season	Team	League	GP	G	A	Pts	PIM	GP	G	A	Pts	PIM
1983–84	SK Uritskogo Kazan	Soviet2	6	0	0	0	—	—	—	—	—	—
1984–85	SK Uritskogo Kazan	Soviet2	14	0	0	0	2	—	—	—	—	—
1985–86	SK Uritskogo Kazan	Soviet2	23	0	1	1	16	—	—	—	—	—
1986–87	SK Uritskogo Kazan	Soviet2	60	11	7	18	50	—	—	—	—	—
1987–88	SKA Sverdlovsk	Soviet2	67	12	5	17	44	—	—	—	—	—
1988–89	SKA Sverdlovsk	Soviet2	34	6	4	10	44	—	—	—	—	—
1988–89	SK Uritskogo Kazan	Soviet2	32	0	4	4	31	—	—	—	—	—
1989–90	SK Uritskogo Kazan	Soviet	30	2	1	3	40	—	—	—	—	—
1990–91	Itil Kazan	Soviet	26	1	4	5	58	—	—	—	—	—
1991–92	Itil Kazan	Soviet	29	6	4	10	52	—	—	—	—	—
1992–93	HC Lada Togliatti	Russia	39	6	6	12	28	10	0	2	2	4
1993–94	HC Lada Togliatti	Russia	43	2	9	11	40	9	1	6	7	24
1994–95	HC Lada Togliatti	Russia	51	7	8	15	36	12	0	0	0	16
1995–96	Ak Bars Kazan	Russia	47	0	5	5	48	5	0	0	0	2
1996–97	Ak Bars Kazan	Russia	39	4	5	9	28	3	0	0	0	4
1997–98	Ak Bars Kazan	Russia	46	1	6	7	73	7	1	3	4	8
1998–99	Ak Bars Kazan	Russia	31	1	4	5	34	7	0	2	2	6
1998–99	Ak Bars Kazan-2	Russia3	4	1	2	3	2	—	—	—	—	—
1999–00	HC Neftekhimik Nizhnekamsk	Russia	35	2	7	9	54	4	0	0	0	0
2000–01	HC Neftekhimik Nizhnekamsk	Russia	42	1	5	6	71	4	0	0	0	4
2001–02	HC Neftekhimik Nizhnekamsk	Russia	32	1	2	3	44	—	—	—	—	—
2001–02	HC Neftekhimik Nizhnekamsk-2	Russia3	4	0	3	3	8	—	—	—	—	—
2002–03	HC Neftekhimik Nizhnekamsk-2	Russia3	4	1	2	3	4	—	—	—	—	—
2003–04	HC Neftekhimik Nizhnekamsk-2	Russia3	1	0	0	0	0	—	—	—	—	—
Russia totals			405	25	57	82	456	61	2	13	15	68

== Awards and honors ==
Award	Year
Russian Championship
Champion (HC Lada Togliatti)	1994
Russian Superleague
Champion (Ak Bars Kazan)	1998
