= Chris Lindberg =

Canadian ice hockey player

- Born: April 16, 1967 (age 59) Fort Frances, Ontario, Canada
- Height: 6 ft 1 in (185 cm)
- Weight: 190 lb (86 kg; 13 st 8 lb)
- Position: Left wing
- Shot: Left
- Played for: Calgary Flames; Quebec Nordiques
- National team: Canada
- NHL draft: Undrafted
- Playing career: 1989–1997

Christopher Lawrence Lindberg (born April 16, 1967) is a Canadian former professional ice hockey player. Lindberg was a member of the Canadian 1992 Winter Olympics ice hockey team, winning a silver medal. He played professionally in North America in the National Hockey League (NHL) with the Calgary Flames and the Quebec Nordiques, but was also associated with the Hartford Whalers. He was claimed by the Ottawa Senators in the 1992 NHL expansion draft from Calgary; two days later, Lindberg was traded back to the Flames for Mark Osiecki. In total, Lindberg played 116 regular season games in the NHL, scoring 17 goals and 25 assists for 42 points, collecting 47 penalty minutes. He spent the remainder of his hockey career playing in leagues in Europe and minor leagues in North America.

== Career ==
=== Amateur ===
Lindberg began playing junior hockey with the Estevan Bruins of the Saskatchewan Junior Hockey League. He initially gave an oral commitment to join the University of Alaska Anchorage to play college hockey with their NCAA Division I Seawolves team. However, in May 1987, the Seawolves were informed that he instead signed a letter of intent to play for the University of Minnesota Duluth Bulldogs of the Western Collegiate Hockey Association (WCHA). Lindberg made his debut with the Bulldogs in the 1987–88 season, scoring two goals in his first game. In his freshman year, he recorded 12 goals, and 10 assists for 22 points in 35 games. He returned for his sophomore season in 1988–89 and played in 36 games, registering 15 goals and 33 points.

=== Professional ===
==== Hartford Whalers ====
Lindberg opted to forego his remaining college eligibility and signed a contract with the Hartford Whalers of the National Hockey League (NHL) on June 10, 1989. He was assigned to Hartford's American Hockey League (AHL) affiliate, the Binghamton Whalers, for the 1989–90 season after attending Hartford's training camp. After playing 20 games with Binghamton and only registering two goals and two assists, Lindberg was assigned to the Virginia Lancers of the East Coast Hockey League (ECHL) on December 12, 1989. He was recalled to Binghamton on February 14, 1990 but was returned to Virginia in March in a mutual agreement with management after appearing in 12 more games with the Whalers, scoring two more goals and two assists. In 26 games with the Lancers, he scored 11 goals and 34 points. The Lancers made the ECHL playoffs but lost to the Greensboro Monarchs in their quarterfinal series with Lindberg adding three assists in their four playoff games.

In the 1990 offseason, Hartford relocated its AHL affiliate from Binghamton to the Springfield Indians. The 1990–91 season was spent primarily playing with Canada's national team. However, in March 1991, Lindberg joined the Indians and played in their final game of the regular season. Springfield made the 1991 Calder Cup playoffs and ending up winning the Calder Cup. Lindberg played in one playoff game, going scoreless. Lindberg was offered a termination contract by Hartford that same month. (Note: A termination contract allowed the player to seek a better position/contract with another team while still having a one-year contract with the original team for the upcoming season.)

==== Calgary Flames ====
Lindberg signed with the Calgary Flames in April 1991. He was invited to their training camp, but returned to the Canadian national team for the 1991–92 season. After national teammate Kent Manderville was traded to the Toronto Maple Leafs, Lindberg became Calgary's top option to join the team in March 1992, once his term with the national team ended. He made his NHL debut for the Flames on February 27 against the Philadelphia Flyers. He registered his first NHL point assisting on Paul Ranheim's third period goal in a 5–5 tie with the Toronto Maple Leafs on March 5. He recorded his first NHL goal on March 19 in a 3–1 victory over the San Jose Sharks, snapping a shot past goaltender Jeff Hackett in the second period to open the scoring in the game. Lindberg finished the season with two goals and seven points in 17 games.

In the 1992 offseason, the NHL expanded by two teams, the Ottawa Senators and Tampa Bay Lightning. Lindberg was among the players left unprotected by the Flames and was selected by the Senators in the 1992 NHL expansion draft on June 18. Flames' general manager Doug Risebrough attempted to prevent Lindberg's selection by reportedly striking a deal with the Lightning and the Senators ahead of the draft, but angrily departed the draft room after the Senators selected him. Rumours of his return to Calgary began shortly after the draft. Five days after the draft on June 23, Lindberg was traded back to the Flames for defenceman Mark Osiecki.

Lindberg began the 1992–93 season with the Flames, playing on the third line with Joel Otto and Paul Ranheim. By January 1993 he was playing on a line with Robert Reichel and Theoren Fleury. That same month, he injured his knee and missed time. Beginning in mid February, he began a period of being in and out of the lineup. He ended up appearing in 62 games, scoring nine goals and 21 points. The Flames made the 1993 Stanley Cup playoffs and advanced to the Smythe Division semifinal against the Los Angeles Kings. Gary Roberts suffered an ankle injury before Game 5 of the series and Lindberg made his NHL playoff debut on April 27 in a 9–4 loss. He earned his first playoff point in the game assisting on Frantisek Musil's second period goal. He appeared in one more game before the Flames were eliminated by the Kings.

In the 1993 offseason, the NHL expanded again, adding the Mighty Ducks of Anaheim and the Florida Panthers. Lindberg was again, left unprotected by Calgary for the 1993 NHL expansion draft. However, he was not selected by either of the expansion teams. The Flames offered Lindberg a termination contract in the offseason and on August 1, he informed the Flames that he would not return to the team.

==== Quebec Nordiques ====
Lindberg signed a contract with the Quebec Nordiques in September 1993. He was invited to training camp and made the Nordiques, making his debut for the team in the season opener on October 6 against the Ottawa Senators. He recorded his first goal for Quebec on October 10, scoring the game winning goal against Ken Wregget in a 5–2 win over the Pittsburgh Penguins. However, he was assigned to Quebec's AHL affiliate, the Cornwall Aces, on November 24. He was recalled by Quebec on December 4 and remained with the Nordiques until January 15, 1994 when he was returned to Cornwall. He was recalled one last time on February 1 but pulled a muscle in his right hip and was sidelined. He returned from the injury and was assigned to Cornwall on March 9. He appeared in 37 games with Quebec, scoring six goals and 14 points. In 23 games with Cornwall, he scored 14 goals and 27 points. The Aces made the 1994 Calder Cup playoffs and advanced to the semifinals only to be eliminated by the Moncton Hawks. In 13 playoff games, Lindberg added 11 goals and 14 points and was the team's leading playoff scorer.

==== Germany and IHL ====
An unrestricted free agent in the 1994 season he opted to sign overseas in Germany with the Krefelder EV 1981 of the Deutsche Eishockey Liga (DEL) for the 1994–95 season. In 42 games, Lindberg scored 25 goals and 66 points. He was selected to play for the DEL all-star team that season that competed for the Deutschland Cup. Krefelder made the DEL playoffs and Lindberg played in 15 playoff games, scoring four goals and 14 points. For the 1995–96 season, the team changed its named to the Krefeld Pinguine and Lindberg registered 21 goals and 56 points in 49 games. In six playoff games, Lindberg added six goals and 14 points. In 1996–97, Lindberg recorded 37 goals and 72 points in 47 games for Krefeld, leading the league in goal scoring. He added only one assist in three playoff games for Krefeld. He briefly joined Grasshopper Club Zurich of the Swiss National League B (NLB) in 1997, playing in one playoff game, going scoreless.

He returned to Krefeld of the DEL for the 1997–98 season, appearing in 15 games, recording two goals and nine points. He was suspended eight games by the DEL for a slashing infraction. However, in November 1997, Lindberg signed a 25-game contract with the Grand Rapids Griffins of the North American International Hockey League (IHL). After playing four games with Grand Rapids and scoring seven points, he was forced to sit out three IHL games to complete his German suspension after complaints from other IHL teams. He returned to Germany after the suspension ended but the Grand Rapids continued to pursue him, especially after losing top scorer Michel Picard to the NHL. He returned to the Griffins again in January 1994 and in 18 games total with Grand Rapids, he scored eight goals and 22 points. However, in February, Lindberg, who had signed to play the remainder of the season with Grand Rapids, sought to be released by the IHL team to go play in Switzerland. His unauthorized departure from the team led him to be suspended by the IHL on February 23. Lindberg signed a contract with EV Zug of the Swiss National League A (NLA) while suspended. It was later revealed that the Griffins had not secured a proper release from the German team and that EV Zug had. He appeared in two regular season games for EV Zug, scoring one goal and two points. EV Zug made the NLA playoffs and advanced to the finals, winning the 1998 league title. Lindberg added six goals, 15 assists for 21 points in 17 playoff games. He led all skaters in the playoffs in assists.

==== Switzerland ====
Lindberg signed with SC Rapperswil-Jona of the NLA for the 1998–99 season. He appeared in 43 games, scoring 22 goals and 50 points. The team advanced to the playoffs where in five games, Lindberg recorded one goal and three points. Lindberg returned to the NHL to attend the Los Angeles Kings training camp in 1999. He attempted to make the NHL team because he was two games short of an NHL pension. However, his trial ended on September 21 when in order to make a deadline to play in Switzerland, he was granted his requested release by the Kings. For the 1999–2000 season, Lindberg once again moved to a new team in the NLA, joining Zurich SC. He appeared in 22 games with Zurich, scoring five goals and 13 points. Lindberg claimed a second NLA title as Zurich were named league champions. He moved on to HC Lugano of the NLA for the 2000–01 season, and appeared in 19 games, scoring nine goals and 17 points. In the playoffs, Lindberg added two goals and seven points in 13 games.

He returned to the NLB for 2001–02, splitting it between EHC Olten and Genève-Servette HC. He made seven appearances for EHC Olten, recording four goals and eight points and three appearances for Genève-Servette HC, marking two goals and four points in the regular season. (Note: Hockeydb.com has Lindberg playing in just seven games for EHC Olten that season, recording six goals and twelve points.) In the NLB playoffs, Lindberg helped Genève-Servette HC get promoted to the NLA as NLB champions. He added three goals and seven points in five playoff games. In the 2002–03 season, Lindberg was on the move again, signing with HC Ajoie. In 37 games, he scored 21 goals and 56 points. In the NLB playoffs he added two goals and three points in five games.

Lindberg moved to the Austrian Hockey League for the 2003–04 season, joining EC VSV. He appeared in 23 games, scoring seven goals and 28 points. The following season in 2004–05, which would be his last in professional hockey, Lindberg joined the Nippon Paper Cranes of the Asia League, appearing in 29 games, scoring 13 goals and 45 points. The Paper Cranes made the playoffs and Lindberg added six goals and seven points in eight games.

== International play ==
Medal record

Ice hockey

Representing Canada

Winter Olympic Games
Silver medal – second place	1992 Albertville	

Lindberg joined the Canadian national team in September 1990, taking part in exhibition games against IHL teams. He joined Canada for the 1990 Spengler Cup, in which Canada advanced to the tournament final. In 1991, he continued playing for the national team, making appearances in exhibition games against other national teams. He appeared in 55 games for the national team in 1990–91, scoring 25 goals and 56 points. He returned to the Canadian national team for the 1991–92 season appearing 56 times, recording 33 goals and 68 points. Lindberg, alongside Brad Schlegel, Todd Brost, Gord Hynes, Dave Archibald, and Randy Smith, formed the core of the team that would represent Canada at the 1992 Winter Olympics in Albertville, France. To reinforce that core, the team added NHL players who were not wanted or needed by their teams, such as Sean Burke and Dave Hannan and highly touted prospects such as Eric Lindros. However, in the gold medal game, with Canada down 2–0 to Russia, it was Lindberg who scored in the third period to bring the Canadians within one goal. Ultimately, the Canadians lost the game 3–1 and Lindberg earned an Olympic silver medal. He played in eight games, scoring the one goal and five points.

After completing the NHL season with Calgary in 1992, Lindberg was invited to join Team Canada for the 1992 World Championship in Prague, Czechoslovakia. Canada was eliminated by Finland in the quarterfinals, 4–3. Lindberg scored in the game in an effort to come back from a 3–0 deficit. Lindberg recorded just the one goal in five games.

He rejoined the Canadian national team for the 1999 Spengler Cup in December 1999. However, the team were eliminated by the Cologne Sharks of the DEL in the round-robin portion of the tournament. In four games, he had two goals and four points. He then joined the national team for a spell early in 2000 appearing in nine games, scoring six goals and eight points. In December 2000 he was once again named to the Canadian team for the 2000 Spengler Cup. The team advanced to the Spengler Cup final but lost to HC Davos. Lindberg played in three games, registering just one assist. Lindberg was named to the Canadian team for the 2002 Spengler Cup. The Canadian team went on to defeat the defending champion HC Davos in the final to win the Spengler Cup. Lindberg recorded two assists in four games.

== Personal life ==
Lindberg was born in Fort Frances, Ontario. He met his wife, Anita, while playing for the Canadian national team in Calgary, Alberta. They have a daughter.

== Career statistics ==
=== Regular season and playoffs ===
			Regular season					Playoffs
Season	Team	League	GP	G	A	Pts	PIM	GP	G	A	Pts	PIM
1985–86	Estevan Bruins	SJHL	60	30	38	68	110	15	5	14	19	6
1987–88	University of Minnesota Duluth	WCHA	35	12	10	22	36	—	—	—	—	—
1988–89	University of Minnesota Duluth	WCHA	36	15	18	33	51	—	—	—	—	—
1989–90	Binghamton Whalers	AHL	32	4	4	8	36	—	—	—	—	—
1989–90	Virginia Lancers	ECHL	26	11	23	34	27	4	0	3	3	2
1990–91	Canada	Intl	55	25	31	56	53	—	—	—	—	—
1990–91	Springfield Indians	AHL	1	0	0	0	2	1	0	0	0	0
1991–92	Canada	Intl	56	33	35	68	63	—	—	—	—	—
1991–92	Calgary Flames	NHL	17	2	5	7	17	—	—	—	—	—
1992–93	Calgary Flames	NHL	62	9	12	21	18	2	0	1	1	2
1993–94	Quebec Nordiques	NHL	37	6	8	14	12	—	—	—	—	—
1993–94	Cornwall Aces	AHL	23	14	13	27	28	13	11	3	14	10
1994–95	Krefelder EV 1981	DEL	42	25	41	66	105	15	4	10	14	20
1995–96	Krefeld Pinguine	DEL	49	19	34	53	96	6	6	8	14	8
1996–97	Krefeld Pinguine	DEL	47	37	34	71	129	3	0	1	1	6
1996–97	Grasshopper Club Zürich	SUI.2	—	—	—	—	—	1	0	0	0	0
1997–98	Krefeld Pinguine	DEL	15	2	7	9	33	—	—	—	—	—
1997–98	Grand Rapids Griffins	IHL	18	8	14	22	25	—	—	—	—	—
1997–98	EV Zug	NDA	2	1	1	2	0	17	6	15	21	22
1998–99	SC Rapperswil–Jona	NDA	43	22	28	50	114	5	1	2	3	4
1999–2000	ZSC Lions	NLA	22	5	8	13	62	—	—	—	—	—
1999–2000	Canada	Intl	9	2	6	8	8	—	—	—	—	—
2000–01	HC Lugano	NLA	19	9	8	17	22	13	2	5	7	42
2001–02	EHC Olten	SUI.2	4	4	4	8	8	—	—	—	—	—
2001–02	Genève–Servette HC	SUI.2	3	2	2	4	4	5	3	4	7	4
2002–03	HC Ajoie	SUI.2	37	21	35	56	152	5	2	1	3	14
2003–04	EC VSV	AUT	23	7	21	28	28	—	—	—	—	—
2004–05	Nippon Paper Cranes	ALH	29	13	32	45	76	8	6	1	7	12
NHL totals			116	17	25	42	47	2	0	1	1	2
DEL totals			153	83	116	199	363	24	10	19	29	34
NDA/NLA totals			86	37	45	82	198	35	9	22	31	68

=== International ===
Year	Team	Event	GP	G	A	Pts	PIM
1992	Canada	OG	8	1	4	5	4
1992	Canada	WC	5	1	0	1	8
Senior totals			13	2	4	6	12
