= Zdeněk Sedlák =

Czech ice hockey right winger

- Born: January 18, 1974 (age 51) Přerov, Czechoslovakia
- Height: 6 ft 1 in (185 cm)
- Weight: 190 lb (86 kg; 13 st 8 lb)
- Position: Right wing
- Shot: Right
- Played for: HC Zlín; HC Železárny Třinec; HC Slezan Opava; HC Plzeň; Blues; JYP; HC Ambrì-Piotta; HC Sparta Praha; HC Vsetín; HC TWK Innsbruck; HC Dinamo Minsk; AaB Ishockey; HC Pustertal Wölfe; Totempo HVIK
- National team: Czech Republic
- Playing career: 1992–2015

Zdeněk Sedlák (born January 18, 1974) is a Czech former professional ice hockey right winger.

Sedlák played 380 games in the Czech Extraliga for HC Zlín, HC Železárny Třinec, HC Slezan Opava, HC Plzeň, HC Sparta Praha and HC Vsetín. He also played in the SM-liiga for Blues and JYP.

Sedlák was also a member of the Czech Republic national team and played in the 2002 World Ice Hockey Championships.

== Career statistics ==
| | | | Regular season | | | | | Playoffs |
| Season | Team | League | GP | G | A | Pts | PIM | GP | G | A | Pts | PIM |
|---|---|---|---|---|---|---|---|---|---|---|---|---|
| 1992–93 | AC Zlín | Czechoslovakia | 17 | 2 | 2 | 4 | — | 3 | 0 | 0 | 0 | — |
| 1993–94 | HC VTJ Tábor | Czech2 | — | 10 | 18 | 28 | — | — | — | — | — | — |
| 1994–95 | AC Zlín | Czech | 27 | 4 | 4 | 8 | 10 | 7 | 0 | 0 | 0 | 6 |
| 1994–95 | HC Hodonín | Czech2 | — | — | — | — | — | — | — | — | — | — |
| 1995–96 | AC Zlín | Czech | 31 | 7 | 9 | 16 | 32 | 8 | 1 | 1 | 2 | 10 |
| 1995–96 | HC Havířov | Czech2 | 5 | 1 | 1 | 2 | — | — | — | — | — | — |
| 1996–97 | AC Zlín | Czech | 31 | 5 | 8 | 13 | 43 | — | — | — | — | — |
| 1996–97 | HC Přerov | Czech2 | 1 | 0 | 1 | 1 | — | — | — | — | — | — |
| 1997–98 | HC Zlín | Czech | 27 | 5 | 6 | 11 | 37 | — | — | — | — | — |
| 1997–98 | HC Třinec | Czech | 11 | 0 | 0 | 0 | 4 | 12 | 1 | 1 | 2 | 14 |
| 1998–99 | HC Slezan Opava | Czech | 40 | 4 | 9 | 13 | 48 | — | — | — | — | — |
| 1998–99 | SK Horácká Slavia Třebíč | Czech2 | — | — | — | — | — | — | — | — | — | — |
| 1999–00 | HC Plzeň | Czech | 52 | 17 | 11 | 28 | 95 | 6 | 0 | 1 | 1 | 33 |
| 2000–01 | Espoo Blues | SM-liiga | 9 | 3 | 2 | 5 | 14 | — | — | — | — | — |
| 2000–01 | JYP Jyväskylä | SM-liiga | 36 | 9 | 10 | 19 | 63 | — | — | — | — | — |
| 2001–02 | HC Plzeň | Czech | 50 | 19 | 12 | 31 | 58 | 6 | 1 | 4 | 5 | 10 |
| 2002–03 | HC Ambrì-Piotta | NLA | 40 | 12 | 12 | 24 | 20 | — | — | — | — | — |
| 2003–04 | HC Plzeň | Czech | 22 | 5 | 4 | 9 | 4 | — | — | — | — | — |
| 2003–04 | HC Sparta Praha | Czech | 21 | 2 | 5 | 7 | 16 | — | — | — | — | — |
| 2003–04 | Vsetínská hokejová | Czech | 9 | 5 | 1 | 6 | 10 | — | — | — | — | — |
| 2004–05 | HC Innsbruck | EBEL | 48 | 17 | 20 | 37 | 75 | 5 | 0 | 2 | 2 | 14 |
| 2005–06 | HC Dinamo Minsk | Belarus | 40 | 6 | 17 | 23 | 56 | 10 | 3 | 4 | 7 | 6 |
| 2006–07 | HC Dinamo Minsk | Belarus | 12 | 1 | 1 | 2 | 20 | — | — | — | — | — |
| 2006–07 | AaB Ishockey | Denmark | 21 | 13 | 11 | 24 | 30 | 17 | 5 | 8 | 13 | 40 |
| 2006–07 | HC Dinamo Minsk-2 | Belarus Vysshaya | 1 | 0 | 2 | 2 | 0 | — | — | — | — | — |
| 2007–08 | HC Pustertal-Val Pusteria | Italy | 28 | 12 | 16 | 28 | 36 | 2 | 0 | 0 | 0 | 6 |
| 2008–09 | TOTEMPO HvIK | Denmark | 38 | 10 | 17 | 27 | 50 | — | — | — | — | — |
| 2009–10 | HC Sumperk | Czech2 | 17 | 3 | 7 | 10 | 14 | — | — | — | — | — |
| 2009–10 | HC Zubr Přerov | Czech3 | 12 | 2 | 9 | 11 | 8 | 8 | 5 | 4 | 9 | 14 |
| 2010–11 | HC Zubr Přerov | Czech3 | 38 | 12 | 32 | 44 | 64 | 5 | 1 | 0 | 1 | 0 |
| 2011–12 | HC Zubr Přerov | Czech3 | 37 | 15 | 18 | 33 | 65 | 9 | 1 | 1 | 2 | 4 |
| 2012–13 | HC Zubr Přerov | Czech3 | 32 | 10 | 15 | 25 | 69 | 8 | 4 | 2 | 6 | 12 |
| 2013–14 | HC Zubr Přerov | Czech3 | 42 | 17 | 26 | 43 | 44 | 12 | 1 | 7 | 8 | 24 |
| 2014–15 | HC Zubr Přerov | Czech3 | 37 | 9 | 19 | 28 | 77 | 12 | 6 | 7 | 13 | 20 |
| Czech totals | | | 321 | 73 | 69 | 142 | 357 | 39 | 3 | 7 | 10 | 73 |
