= Joaquin Gage =

Canadian ice hockey player (born 1973)

- Born: October 19, 1973 (age 52) Vancouver, British Columbia, Canada
- Height: 6 ft 0 in (183 cm)
- Weight: 218 lb (99 kg; 15 st 8 lb)
- Position: Goaltender
- Caught: Left
- Played for: Edmonton Oilers
- NHL draft: 109th overall, 1992; Edmonton Oilers
- Playing career: 1994–2008

Joaquin Jesse Gage (born October 19, 1973) is a Canadian former professional ice hockey goaltender. Gage was selected in the fifth round of the 1992 NHL entry draft, 109th overall, by the Edmonton Oilers, and played 23 games in the NHL with the Oilers.

== Career ==
Gage was born in Vancouver, British Columbia. He spent his junior career with the Portland Winter Hawks of the WHL. As a professional, he spent the majority of his North American career in the AHL and the ECHL.

During the 2001–02 season, Gage was named MVP of the British Superleague while playing for the Ayr Scottish Eagles.

== Personal life ==
Born in Canada, Gage is of Haitian descent.

One of the Hosts of EST Afternoons, alongside Hernan Salas.

== Career statistics ==
=== Regular season and playoffs ===
			Regular season									Playoffs
Season	Team	League	GP	W	L	T	MIN	GA	SO	GAA	SV%	GP	W	L	T	MIN	GA	SO	GAA	SV%
1990–91	Bellingham Ice Hawks	BCJHL	16	—	—	—	751	64	0	5.11	.849	—	—	—	—	—	—	—	—	—
1990–91	Chilliwack Chiefs	BCJHL	2	1	0	0	85	11	0	7.76	.828	—	—	—	—	—	—	—	—	—
1990–91	Portland Winter Hawks	WHL	3	0	3	0	180	17	0	5.70	.841	—	—	—	—	—	—	—	—	—
1991–92	Portland Winter Hawks	WHL	63	27	30	4	3635	269	2	4.44	.871	6	2	4	—	366	28	0	4.59	.851
1992–93	Portland Winter Hawks	WHL	38	21	16	1	2302	153	2	3.99	.875	8	5	2	—	427	30	0	4.22	.865
1993–94	Prince Albert Raiders	WHL	53	24	25	3	3041	212	1	4.18	.866	—	—	—	—	—	—	—	—	—
1994–95	Edmonton Oilers	NHL	2	0	2	0	99	7	0	4.25	.825	—	—	—	—	—	—	—	—	—
1994–95	Cape Breton Oilers	AHL	54	17	28	5	3010	207	0	4.13	.877	—	—	—	—	—	—	—	—	—
1995–96	Edmonton Oilers	NHL	19	2	8	1	717	45	0	3.77	.871	—	—	—	—	—	—	—	—	—
1995–96	Cape Breton Oilers	AHL	21	8	11	0	1162	80	0	4.13	.869	—	—	—	—	—	—	—	—	—
1996–97	Hamilton Bulldogs	AHL	29	7	14	4	1558	91	0	3.50	.892	—	—	—	—	—	—	—	—	—
1996–97	Wheeling Nailers	ECHL	3	1	0	0	120	8	0	4.00	.857	—	—	—	—	—	—	—	—	—
1997–98	Raleigh IceCaps	ECHL	39	19	14	3	2173	116	1	3.20	.907	—	—	—	—	—	—	—	—	—
1997–98	Syracuse Crunch	AHL	2	1	1	0	120	7	0	3.50	.879	—	—	—	—	—	—	—	—	—
1998–99	Augusta Lynx	ECHL	5	5	0	0	300	16	0	3.20	.888	—	—	—	—	—	—	—	—	—
1998–99	Portland Pirates	AHL	26	8	11	3	1429	69	2	2.90	.909	—	—	—	—	—	—	—	—	—
1998–99	Providence Bruins	AHL	3	0	2	0	130	9	0	4.16	.870	—	—	—	—	—	—	—	—	—
1998–99	Syracuse Crunch	AHL	12	2	8	2	706	46	0	3.91	.884	—	—	—	—	—	—	—	—	—
1999–00	Canadian National Team	Intl	29	13	10	2	1530	83	0	3.25	.897	—	—	—	—	—	—	—	—	—
1999–00	Hamilton Bulldogs	AHL	2	0	1	1	124	5	0	2.42	.857	10	5	5	—	580	28	0	2.89	.912
2000–01	Edmonton Oilers	NHL	5	2	2	0	260	15	0	3.46	.880	—	—	—	—	—	—	—	—	—
2000–01	Hamilton Bulldogs	AHL	37	12	22	2	2129	118	0	3.33	.905	—	—	—	—	—	—	—	—	—
2001–02	Ayr Scottish Eagles	BISL	41	18	16	7	2459	104	2	2.54	.909	7	5	1	1	420	15	0	2.14	.929
2002–03	Djurgården	SEL	42	—	—	—	2441	104	3	2.56	.903	12	—	—	—	742	30	1	2.42	.914
2003–04	Kassel Huskies	DEL	48	—	—	—	2816	137	1	2.92	.908	—	—	—	—	—	—	—	—	—
2004–05	Kassel Huskies	DEL	35	—	—	—	2013	107	2	3.19	.907	7	—	—	—	414	17	2	2.46	.940
2005–06	Kassel Huskies	DEL	50	—	—	—	2930	155	1	3.17	.915	5	—	—	—	266	21	0	4.73	—
2006–07	Moskitos Essen	GER-2	38	—	—	—	—	—	—	3.57	—	—	—	—	—	—	—	—	—	—
2007–08	HC Pustertal	ITA	18	—	—	—	1903	94	0	2.96	.898	—	—	—	—	—	—	—	—	—
NHL totals			23	4	12	1	1077	67	0	3.74	.870	—	—	—	—	—	—	—	—	—
