= 1999–2000 Euro Hockey Tour =

Tournament details
- Dates: 2 September 1999 – 13 February 2000
- Teams: 4

Final positions
- Champions: Finland (2nd title)
- Runners-up: Czech Republic
- Third place: Russia
- Fourth place: Sweden

Tournament statistics
- Games played: 24
- Goals scored: 115 (4.79 per game)
- Attendance: 139,830 (5,826 per game)

The 1999–2000 Euro Hockey Tour was the fourth season of the Euro Hockey Tour. The season consisted of four tournaments, the Česká Pojišťovna Cup, Karjala Tournament, Baltica Brewery Cup, and the Sweden Hockey Games. The games Canada participated in did not count towards the final standings of the tournament.

== Standings ==
Pos	Team	Pld	W	D	L	GF	GA	GD	Pts
1	Finland	12	8	2	2	27	20	+7	18
2	Czech Republic	12	7	1	4	31	20	+11	15
3	Russia	12	5	2	5	33	35	−2	12
4	Sweden	12	1	1	10	24	40	−16	3

Source: eurohockey

== Česká Pojišťovna Cup ==
The tournament was played between 2–5 September 1999. All of the matches were played in Zlín, Czech Republic. The tournament was won by Czech Republic.

Pos	Team	Pld	W	D	L	GF	GA	GD	Pts
1	Czech Republic	3	3	0	0	10	3	+7	9
2	Finland	3	1	1	1	6	8	−2	4
3	Sweden	3	1	0	2	10	12	−2	3
4	Russia	3	0	1	2	7	10	−3	1

Source: swehockey

2 September 1999
Russia	2–2	Finland
Czech Republic	3–2	Sweden
4 September 1999
Finland	4–3	Sweden
Russia	1–3	Czech Republic
5 September 1999
Sweden	5–0	Russia
Czech Republic	3–0	Finland

== Karjala Tournament ==
The tournament was played between 11–11 November 1999. All of the matches were played in Helsinki and Espoo, Finland. The tournament was won by Finland.

Pos	Team	Pld	W	D	L	GF	GA	GD	Pts
1	Finland	3	3	0	0	8	5	+3	6
2	Russia	3	2	0	1	8	7	+1	4
3	Czech Republic	3	1	0	2	7	7	0	2
4	Sweden	3	0	0	3	6	11	−5	0

Source: hokej

11 November 1999
Russia	4–3	Sweden
Czech Republic	2–3	Finland
13 November 1999
Finland	2–1	Russia
Czech Republic	4–1	Sweden
14 November 1999
Czech Republic	1–3	Russia
Finland	3–2	Sweden

== Baltica Brewery Cup ==
The tournament was played between 16–21 December 1999. All of the matches were played in Moscow, Russia. The tournament was won by Russia.

Pos	Team	Pld	W	D	L	GF	GA	GD	Pts
1	Russia	4	3	1	0	19	10	+9	10
2	Czech Republic	4	2	1	1	10	6	+4	7
3	Finland	4	1	2	1	7	9	−2	5
4	Sweden	4	1	1	2	9	9	0	4
5	Canada	4	0	1	3	6	20	−14	1

Source: swehockey

16 December 1999
Czech Republic	2–0	Sweden
Russia	8–2	Canada
17 December 1999
Finland	3–1	Czech Republic
Canada	0–4	Sweden
18 December 1999
Finland	2–3	Russia
19 December 1999
Russia	1–1	Czech Republic
20 December 1999
Czech Republic	6–2	Canada
Sweden	0–0	Finland
21 December 1999
Canada	2–2	Finland
Sweden	5–7	Russia

== Sweden Hockey Games ==
The tournament was played between 8–13 February 2000. All of the matches were played in Stockholm, Sweden. The tournament was won by Finland.

Pos	Team	Pld	W	D	L	GF	GA	GD	Pts
1	Finland	4	3	0	1	10	6	+4	9
2	Czech Republic	4	3	0	1	11	6	+5	9
3	Canada	4	2	1	1	8	7	+1	7
4	Russia	4	1	0	3	9	14	−5	3
5	Sweden	4	0	1	3	5	10	−5	1

Source: swehockey

8 February 2000
Czech Republic	6–2	Russia
Canada	2–2	Sweden
9 February 2000
Finland	3–1	Czech Republic
10 February 2000
Finland	2–3	Canada
Sweden	2–3	Russia
11 February 2000
Czech Republic	1–0	Canada
12 February 2000
Russia	2–3	Finland
Czech Republic	3–1	Sweden
13 February 2000
Canada	3–2	Russia
Sweden	0–2	Finland
