= Petter Rönnquist =

Swedish ice hockey player (born 1973)

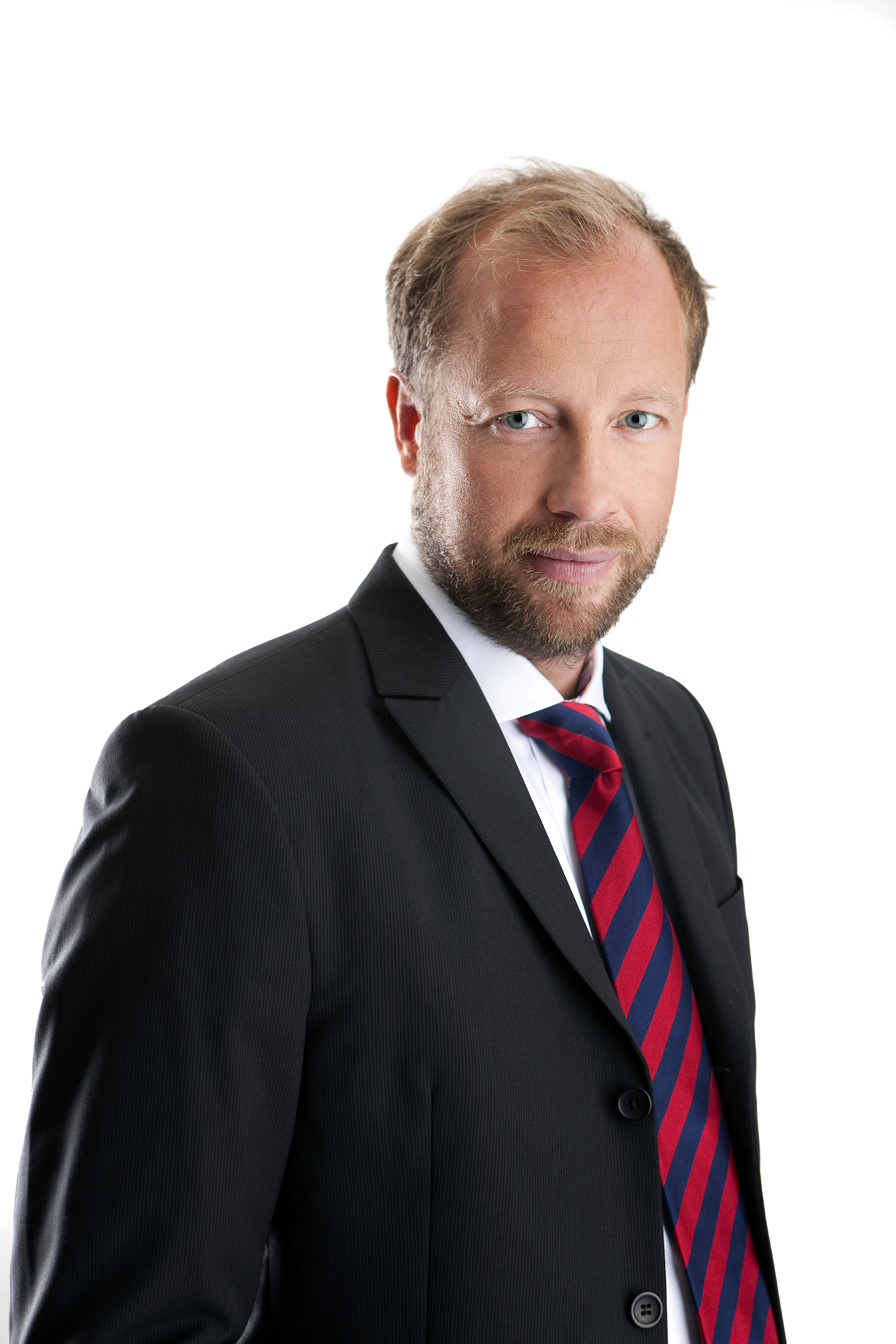
- Petter Rönnquist in 2013
- Born: February 7, 1973 (age 52); Stockholm, Sweden
- Height: 5 ft 11 in (180 cm)
- Weight: 176 lb (80 kg; 12 st 8 lb)
- Position: Goaltender
- Caught: Left
- Played for: Modo Hockey; Djurgårdens IF; Frölunda HC; HC Davos
- National team: Sweden
- NHL draft: 264th overall, 1992; Ottawa Senators
- Playing career: 1992–2006

Petter Rönnquist (born February 7, 1973) is a Swedish former professional ice hockey goaltender. He had a long professional career with various teams in the Swedish Elitserien including Modo Hockey, Djurgårdens IF, Frölunda HC. He also played one season in Switzerland with HC Davos and represented Sweden internationally.

== Playing career ==
Rönnquist played junior hockey with Nacka HK from 1990 until 1992 and was selected to the Swedish team at the 1991 European Junior Championship. In 1992, he was drafted by the Ottawa Senators of the National Hockey League (NHL) but he chose instead to play in Sweden. He joined Djurgårdens IF of the Eliserien in 1992 and stayed with the team until 1994. In 1993, he played nine games for Sweden in the 1993 World Junior Championship. He joined Modo in 1994, and played four seasons with club, with one season (1996–97) back at Djurgården. His best season was his last (1998–99) with Modo, playing 41 games with a 1.86 GAA and he was selected for Team Sweden at the 1999 World Championships. This was the pinnacle of his career.

After that he signed for one season with HC Davos and played for several teams back in Sweden (Björklöven, Frölunda, Leksand ) before returning to Djurgården for his final time in the Elitserien in the 2003–04 season. He played in various minor leagues after that before retiring in 2006 after a season as backup with Djurgården.
