= 2005–06 Serie A (ice hockey) season =

Ice Hockey Season

The 2005–06 Serie A season was the 72nd season of the Serie A, the top level of ice hockey in Italy. Eight teams participated in the league, and the HC Milano Vipers won the championship by defeating SV Ritten in the final.

== First round ==
	Club	GP	W	T	L	GF–GA	Pts
1.	HC Milano Vipers	42	24	6	12	143:104	54
2.	HC Alleghe	42	19	11	12	132:104	49
3.	SV Ritten	42	19	10	13	122:113	48
4.	SG Cortina	42	19	7	16	122:104	45
5.	Asiago Hockey	42	18	8	16	113:109	44
6.	HC Bozen	42	15	10	17	115:110	40
7.	HC Brunico	42	12	10	20	114:154	34
8.	SHC Fassa	42	8	6	28	103:166	22

== Second round ==
=== Group A ===
	Club	GP	W	T	L	GF–GA	Pts (Bonus)
1.	HC Milano Vipers	6	1	5	0	18:14	25(18)
2.	SG Cortina	6	2	3	1	16:14	22(15)
3.	Asiago Hockey	6	0	2	4	12:22	16(14)
4.	SHC Fassa	6	3	2	1	19:15	15(7)

=== Group B ===
	Club	GP	W	T	L	GF–GA	Pts (Bonus)
1.	SV Ritten	6	4	1	1	33:24	25(16)
2.	HC Alleghe	6	4	0	2	30:20	24(16)
3.	HC Bozen	6	1	1	4	17:22	16(13)
4.	HC Brunico	6	2	0	4	18:32	15(11)

== Playoffs ==
=== Semifinals ===
- HC Milano Vipers - HC Alleghe 3:1 (5:2, 4:5 OT, 6:1, 6:5 OT)
- SV Ritten - SG Cortina 3:2 (2:5, 4:6, 4:3 OT, 3:1, 5:2)

=== Final ===
- HC Milano Vipers - SV Ritten 3:0 (4:1, 3:1, 4:3 SO)
