= Dmitri Vlasenkov =

Russian ice hockey player

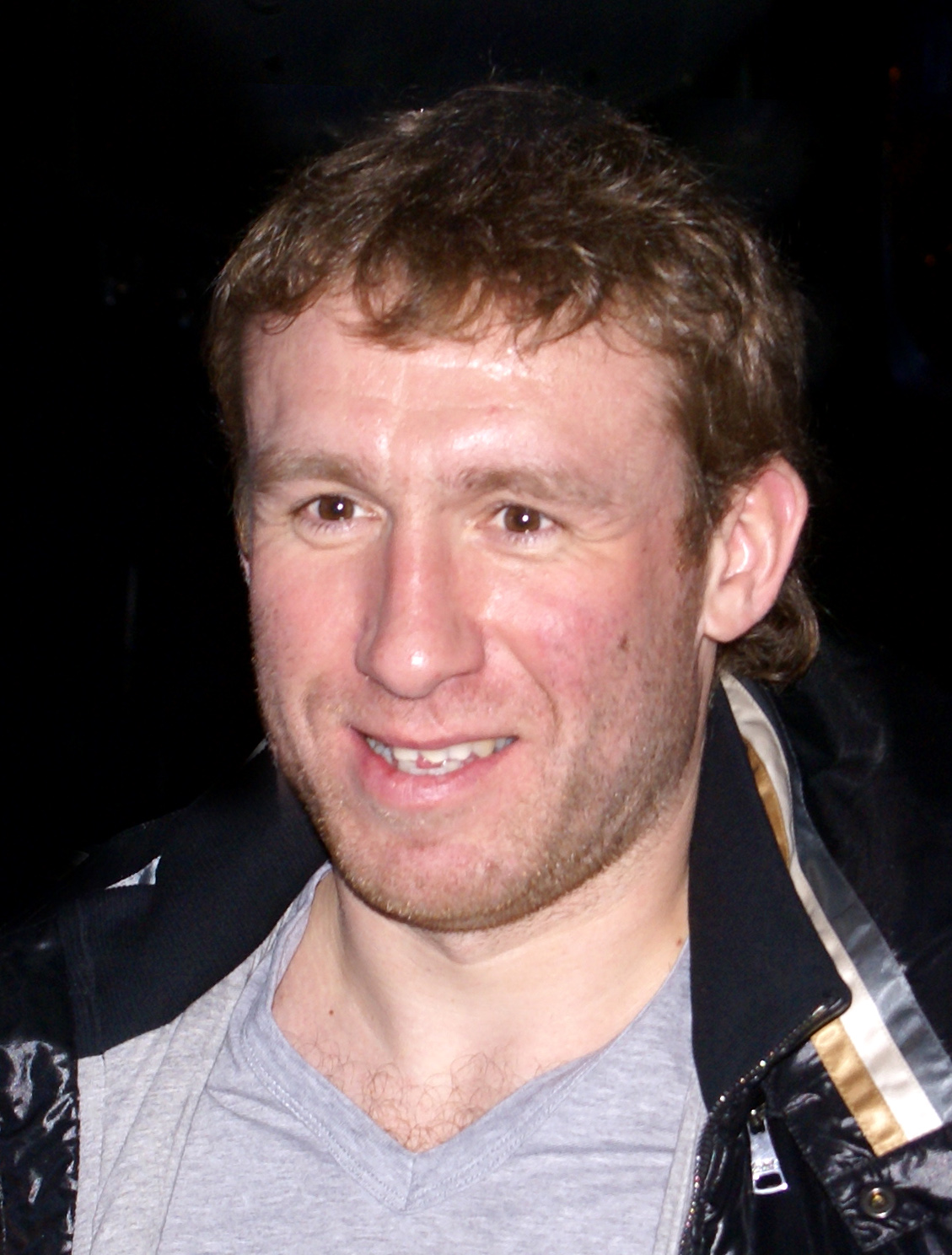
- Born: 1 January 1978 (age 48) Olenegorsk, Russian SFSR
- Height: 6 ft 0 in (183 cm)
- Weight: 218 lb (99 kg; 15 st 8 lb)
- Position: Left wing
- Shot: Left
- Played for: Lokomotiv Yaroslavl; Atlant Mytishchi; Avangard Omsk; Orlando Solar Bears; Severstal Cherepovets
- NHL draft: 73rd overall, 1996; Calgary Flames
- Playing career: 1995–2015

Dmitri Vyacheslavovich Vlasenkov (born 1 January 1978) is a Russian former ice hockey forward who last played with Severstal Cherepovets of the Kontinental Hockey League.

He was selected by the Calgary Flames in the 3rd round (73rd overall) of the 1996 NHL entry draft.

== Career statistics ==
| | | | Regular season | | | | | Playoffs |
| Season | Team | League | GP | G | A | Pts | PIM | GP | G | A | Pts | PIM |
|---|---|---|---|---|---|---|---|---|---|---|---|---|
| 1993–94 | Torpedo Yaroslavl-2 | Russia3 | 14 | 0 | 0 | 0 | 2 | — | — | — | — | — |
| 1994–95 | Torpedo Yaroslavl-2 | Russia2 | 30 | 7 | 3 | 10 | 12 | — | — | — | — | — |
| 1995–96 | Torpedo Yaroslavl | Russia | 17 | 1 | 1 | 2 | 4 | 1 | 0 | 0 | 0 | 0 |
| 1995–96 | Torpedo Yaroslavl-2 | Russia2 | 33 | 16 | 6 | 22 | 6 | — | — | — | — | — |
| 1996–97 | Torpedo Yaroslavl | Russia | 28 | 3 | 2 | 5 | 10 | 8 | 1 | 1 | 2 | 2 |
| 1996–97 | Torpedo Yaroslavl-2 | Russia3 | 29 | 20 | 5 | 25 | 10 | — | — | — | — | — |
| 1997–98 | Torpedo Yaroslavl | Russia | 44 | 10 | 3 | 13 | 12 | 7 | 0 | 0 | 0 | 2 |
| 1997–98 | Torpedo Yaroslavl-2 | Russia2 | 2 | 1 | 1 | 2 | 0 | — | — | — | — | — |
| 1998–99 | Torpedo Yaroslavl | Russia | 41 | 11 | 5 | 16 | 26 | 14 | 2 | 3 | 5 | 6 |
| 1999–00 | Torpedo Yaroslavl | Russia | 38 | 15 | 20 | 35 | 10 | 10 | 3 | 4 | 7 | 6 |
| 2000–01 | Orlando Solar Bears | IHL | 49 | 5 | 8 | 13 | 10 | 1 | 0 | 0 | 0 | 0 |
| 2001–02 | Lokomotiv Yaroslavl | Russia | 1 | 0 | 0 | 0 | 0 | 6 | 1 | 1 | 2 | 4 |
| 2002–03 | Lokomotiv Yaroslavl | Russia | 44 | 8 | 15 | 23 | 34 | 3 | 0 | 1 | 1 | 0 |
| 2002–03 | Lokomotiv Yaroslavl-2 | Russia3 | 6 | 4 | 4 | 8 | 0 | — | — | — | — | — |
| 2003–04 | Lokomotiv Yaroslavl | Russia | 22 | 2 | 4 | 6 | 2 | 1 | 0 | 0 | 0 | 0 |
| 2003–04 | Lokomotiv Yaroslavl-2 | Russia3 | 11 | 8 | 5 | 13 | 6 | — | — | — | — | — |
| 2004–05 | Lokomotiv Yaroslavl | Russia | 51 | 10 | 9 | 19 | 36 | 9 | 2 | 0 | 2 | 6 |
| 2004–05 | Lokomotiv Yaroslavl-2 | Russia3 | 2 | 2 | 3 | 5 | 14 | — | — | — | — | — |
| 2005–06 | Lokomotiv Yaroslavl | Russia | 51 | 18 | 18 | 36 | 57 | 11 | 2 | 5 | 7 | 6 |
| 2006–07 | Lokomotiv Yaroslavl | Russia | 54 | 13 | 17 | 30 | 30 | 7 | 2 | 0 | 2 | 2 |
| 2007–08 | Khimik Mytishchi | Russia | 56 | 11 | 5 | 16 | 52 | 5 | 1 | 1 | 2 | 2 |
| 2008–09 | Atlant Mytishchi | KHL | 30 | 3 | 4 | 7 | 4 | — | — | — | — | — |
| 2008–09 | Avangard Omsk | KHL | 21 | 8 | 5 | 13 | 12 | 9 | 5 | 1 | 6 | 6 |
| 2009–10 | Avangard Omsk | KHL | 47 | 6 | 11 | 17 | 57 | 3 | 0 | 0 | 0 | 2 |
| 2010–11 | Avangard Omsk | KHL | 52 | 1 | 7 | 8 | 22 | 14 | 1 | 3 | 4 | 4 |
| 2011–12 | Avangard Omsk | KHL | 5 | 0 | 0 | 0 | 0 | — | — | — | — | — |
| 2011–12 | Arlan Kokshetau | Kazakhstan | 5 | 4 | 4 | 8 | 0 | — | — | — | — | — |
| 2011–12 | Severstal Cherepovets | KHL | 21 | 0 | 4 | 4 | 10 | 6 | 0 | 3 | 3 | 0 |
| 2013–14 | Arlan Kokshetau | Kazakhstan | 44 | 7 | 21 | 28 | 20 | 14 | 0 | 6 | 6 | 0 |
| 2014–15 | HC CSKA Sofia | Bulgaria | — | — | — | — | — | — | — | — | — | — |
| IHL totals | | | 49 | 5 | 8 | 13 | 10 | 1 | 0 | 0 | 0 | 0 |
| KHL totals | | | 176 | 18 | 31 | 49 | 105 | 32 | 6 | 7 | 13 | 12 |
| Russia totals | | | 447 | 102 | 99 | 201 | 273 | 82 | 14 | 16 | 30 | 36 |
