= Oleg Shargorodsky =

Russian ice hockey player

Personal information
- Nationality: Russian
- Born: 18 November 1969 (age 55) Kharkiv, Ukrainian SSR, Soviet Union

Sport
- Sport: Ice hockey

Oleg Shargorodsky (born 18 November 1969) is a Russian ice hockey player. He competed in the men's tournament at the 1994 Winter Olympics.

== Career statistics ==
=== Regular season and playoffs ===
			Regular season					Playoffs
Season	Team	League	GP	G	A	Pts	PIM	GP	G	A	Pts	PIM
1987–88	Dynamo Kharkiv	URS.2	5	0	0	0	0	—	—	—	—	—
1988–89	Dynamo Kharkiv	URS	23	0	1	1	8	—	—	—	—	—
1989–90	Dynamo Kharkiv	URS	30	2	0	2	6	—	—	—	—	—
1990–91	Dynamo Kharkiv	URS.2	43	2	7	9	56	—	—	—	—	—
1991–92	Dynamo Moscow	CIS	35	3	3	6	38	1	0	0	0	2
1991–92	Dynamo–2 Moscow	CIS.3	10	2	2	4	8	—	—	—	—	—
1992–93	Dynamo Moscow	RUS	42	3	2	5	32	10	0	0	0	0
1993–94	Dynamo Moscow	RUS	38	9	10	19	42	9	1	1	2	10
1994–95	Houston Aeros	IHL	62	7	26	33	52	—	—	—	—	—
1994–95	Detroit Vipers	IHL	10	3	4	7	10	5	0	2	2	11
1995–96	Detroit Vipers	IHL	11	2	5	7	22	—	—	—	—	—
1995–96	Phoenix Roadrunners	IHL	67	9	21	30	89	3	0	2	2	9
1996–97	Detroit Vipers	IHL	3	0	3	3	4	—	—	—	—	—
1996–97	CSKA Moscow	RSL	29	2	5	7	38	2	0	0	0	4
1997–98	HPK	SM-l	47	7	14	21	134	—	—	—	—	—
1998–99	Fort Wayne Komets	IHL	79	18	30	48	100	2	0	0	0	0
1999–2000	Metallurg Novokuznetsk	RSL	35	8	6	14	53	10	1	3	4	20
2000–01	Avangard Omsk	RSL	35	2	9	11	40	16	4	6	10	8
2001–02	Avangard Omsk	RSL	46	8	13	21	44	8	0	2	2	47
2002–03	Avangard Omsk	RSL	11	1	2	3	4	—	—	—	—	—
2002–03	Ak Bars Kazan	RSL	26	3	2	5	38	3	0	0	0	4
2003–04	Krylia Sovetov Moscow	RUS.2	54	7	13	20	56	4	0	0	0	0
2003–04	Krylia Sovetov–2 Moscow	RUS.3	3	0	1	1	2	—	—	—	—	—
URS/CIS totals			88	5	4	9	22	1	0	0	0	2
IHL totals			232	39	89	128	277	10	0	4	4	20
RSL totals			182	24	37	61	207	39	5	11	16	83

=== International ===
Year	Team	Event	GP	G	A	Pts	PIM
1987	Soviet Union	EJC	7	4	3	7	4
1994	Russia	OG	8	0	0	0	4
Senior totals			8	0	0	0	4

"Oleg Shargorodsky". Elite Prospects.
