= Vesa Viitakoski =

Finnish ice hockey player

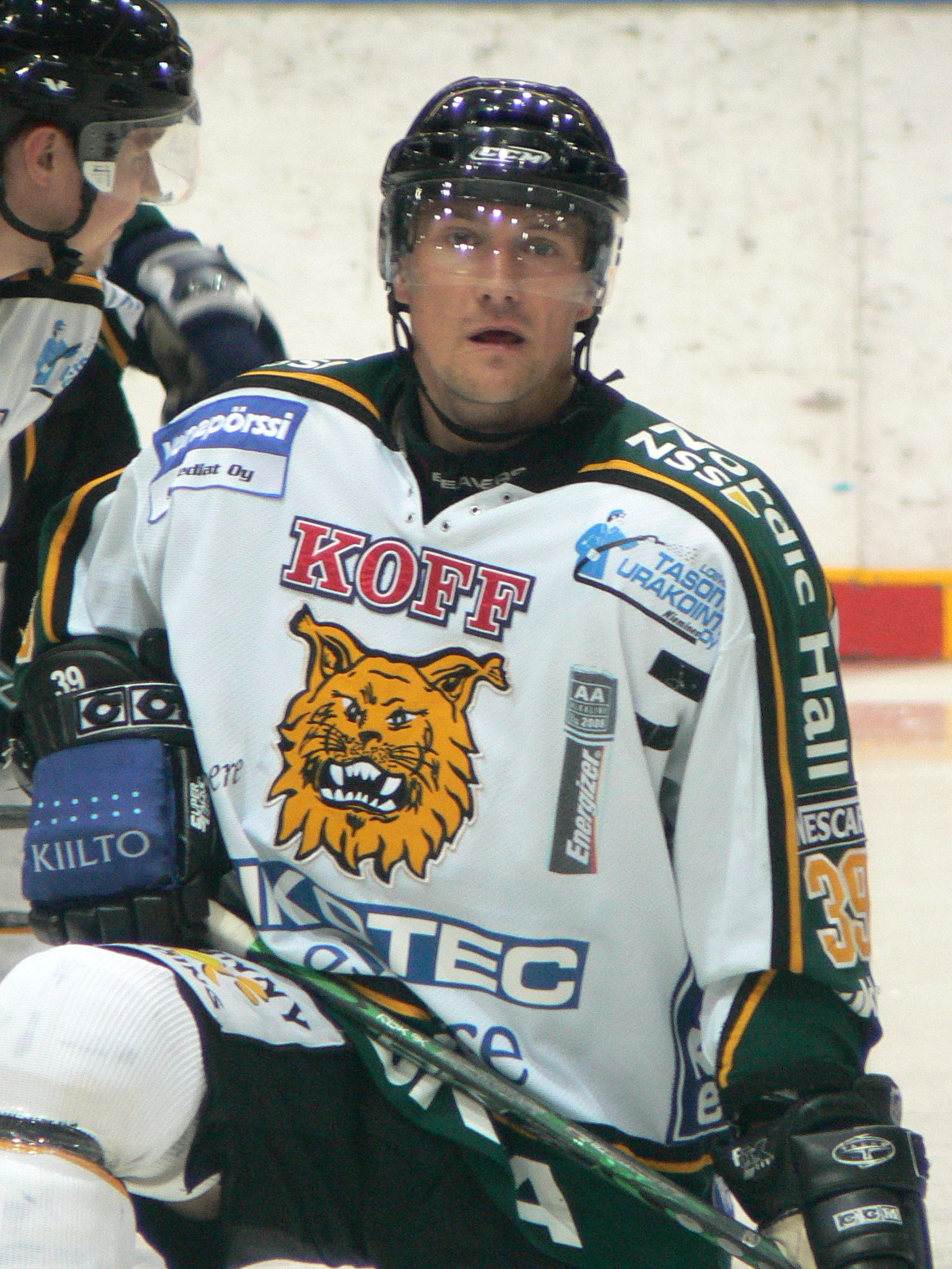
- Born: 13 February 1971 (age 55) Lappeenranta, FIN
- Height: 6 ft 2 in (188 cm)
- Weight: 212 lb (96 kg; 15 st 2 lb)
- Position: Left wing
- Shot: Left
- Played for: SM-l; SaiPa; Tappara; Ilves; Kärpät; NHL; Calgary Flames; SEL; HV71; Brynäs IF
- NHL draft: 32nd overall, 1990; Calgary Flames
- Playing career: 1988–2010

Vesa Ilmari Viitakoski (born 13 February 1971 in Lappeenranta, Finland) is a former professional ice hockey player.

== Career ==
Viitakoski started his professional career in his hometown, Lappeenranta, playing for two seasons in the local club, SaiPa. When SaiPa was relegated at the end of the 1990 SM-liiga season, Viitakoski moved to Tappara Tampere. After three seasons there and a strong performance in the national team, especially in the 1992 IIHF World Championships from which Team Finland came home with silver medals, he signed with the Calgary Flames.

All in all, Viitakoski appeared in 23 NHL games with the Flames in the 1993–94, 94–95 and 95–96 seasons, scoring two goals and providing four assists. He also played 198 AHL games as a member of the Saint John Flames and Cornwall Aces squads, with a point total of 72+106=178. Despite this consistently strong performance in the AHL he never broke through in the NHL; this has been attributed to disfavor by the then head coach Dave King.

Abandoning hope for an NHL career, Viitakoski returned to Europe to play for HV71 in the Swedish Elitserien during the 1996–1997 season. After one season there he came back to Finland and Tampere, but not to Tappara but their local rival, Ilves. Since then, Viitakoski played in Ilves, except for one and a half seasons spent in Brynäs IF of the Elitserien, in 2004–05, until he signed with Kärpät in April 2008.

== Career statistics ==
=== Regular season and playoffs ===
			Regular season					Playoffs
Season	Team	League	GP	G	A	Pts	PIM	GP	G	A	Pts	PIM
1986–87	SaiPa	FIN U20	1	1	1	2	2	—	—	—	—	—
1987–88	SaiPa	FIN U18	7	20	5	25	2	—	—	—	—	—
1987–88	SaiPa	FIN U20	20	21	11	32	16	—	—	—	—	—
1988–89	SaiPa	FIN U20	23	22	32	54	8	—	—	—	—	—
1988–89	SaiPa	SM-l	11	4	1	5	6	—	—	—	—	—
1989–90	SaiPa	FIN U20	9	9	8	17	6	—	—	—	—	—
1989–90	SaiPa	SM-l	44	24	10	34	8	—	—	—	—	—
1990–91	Tappara	SM-l	41	17	23	40	14	3	2	0	2	4
1991–92	Tappara	SM-l	44	19	19	38	39	—	—	—	—	—
1992–93	Tappara	SM-l	48	27	27	54	28	—	—	—	—	—
1993–94	Calgary Flames	NHL	8	1	2	3	0	—	—	—	—	—
1993–94	Saint John Flames	AHL	67	28	39	67	24	5	1	2	3	2
1994–95	Calgary Flames	NHL	10	1	2	3	6	—	—	—	—	—
1994–95	Saint John Flames	AHL	56	17	26	43	8	4	0	1	1	2
1995–96	Calgary Flames	NHL	5	0	0	0	2	—	—	—	—	—
1995–96	Saint John Flames	AHL	48	18	29	47	48	—	—	—	—	—
1995–96	Cornwall Aces	AHL	10	7	6	13	4	8	1	3	4	2
1996–97	HV71	SEL	50	17	12	29	24	5	1	1	2	2
1997–98	Ilves	SM-l	47	11	19	30	12	9	2	4	6	4
1998–99	Ilves	SM-l	53	17	5	22	18	4	2	1	3	2
1999–2000	Ilves	SM-l	53	20	20	40	28	3	1	0	1	4
2000–01	Ilves	SM-l	55	27	20	47	10	9	3	3	6	6
2001–02	Ilves	SM-l	56	34	26	60	12	3	0	0	0	0
2002–03	Ilves	SM-l	53	18	12	30	22	—	—	—	—	—
2003–04	Ilves	SM-l	56	21	15	36	14	7	2	2	4	2
2004–05	Brynäs IF	SEL	47	12	10	22	14	—	—	—	—	—
2005–06	Brynäs IF	SEL	13	1	2	3	16	—	—	—	—	—
2005–06	Ilves	SM-l	29	6	4	10	16	4	0	1	1	2
2006–07	Ilves	SM-l	56	17	12	29	38	7	1	0	1	2
2007–08	Ilves	SM-l	55	14	12	26	26	9	3	3	6	4
2008–09	Kärpät	SM-l	50	11	9	20	49	14	4	2	6	4
2009–10	Kärpät	SM-l	52	9	10	19	22	10	2	0	2	0
SM-l totals			803	296	244	540	362	82	22	16	38	34
SEL totals			110	30	24	54	54	5	1	1	2	2

=== International ===
Year	Team	Event	GP	G	A	Pts	PIM
1989	Finland	EJC	6	8	7	15	6
1990	Finland	WJC	7	6	1	7	2
1991	Finland	WJC	7	6	5	11	2
1992	Finland	WC	8	2	3	5	6
1993	Finland	WC	6	1	0	1	6
2002	Finland	WC	9	1	1	2	2
Junior totals			20	20	13	33	10
Senior totals			23	4	4	8	14
