= Jamie Ram =

Canadian ice hockey player

- Born: January 18, 1971 (age 55) Scarborough, Ontario, Canada
- Height: 5 ft 11 in (180 cm)
- Weight: 189 lb (86 kg; 13 st 7 lb)
- Position: Goaltender
- Caught: Right
- Played for: New York Rangers; Sapporo Snow Brand; Jokerit; Brynäs IF; Severstal Cherepovets; Amur Khabarovsk
- National team: Canada
- NHL draft: 213th overall, 1991; New York Rangers
- Playing career: 1994–2004

James Ernest Charles Ram (born January 18, 1971) is a Canadian former professional ice hockey goaltender. He played one game in the National Hockey League with the New York Rangers during the 1995–96 season. The rest of his career, which lasted from 1994 to 2004, was spent in the minor leagues and then in both Japan and Europe.

== Biography ==
Ram was born in Scarborough, Ontario. As a youth, he played in the 1984 Quebec International Pee-Wee Hockey Tournament, with a minor ice hockey team from Mississauga.

He was drafted in the tenth round, 213th overall, by the New York Rangers in the 1991 NHL entry draft. He played one game in the National Hockey League with the Rangers, in the 1995–96 season, when he replaced Glenn Healy and played the last 27 minutes of a game against the Colorado Avalanche on February 3, 1996. He stopped all nine shots he faced.

Ram is married to Tania Ram, and has two sons and two daughters.

== Career statistics ==
=== Regular season and playoffs ===
			Regular season									Playoffs
Season	Team	League	GP	W	L	T	MIN	GA	SO	GAA	SV%	GP	W	L	MIN	GA	SO	GAA	SV%
1988–89	Henry Carr Crusaders	MetJBHL	24	11	8	2	1200	82	1	4.10	—	—	—	—	—	—	—	—	—
1989–90	Henry Carr Crusaders	MetJBHL	23	14	5	2	1302	63	1	2.90	—	—	—	—	—	—	—	—	—
1990–91	Michigan Tech	WCHA	14	5	9	0	826	57	0	4.14	.901	—	—	—	—	—	—	—	—
1991–92	Michigan Tech	WCHA	23	9	9	1	1144	83	0	4.35	.875	—	—	—	—	—	—	—	—
1992–93	Michigan Tech	WCHA	36	16	14	5	2078	115	0	3.32	.899	—	—	—	—	—	—	—	—
1993–94	Michigan Tech	WCHA	39	12	20	5	2192	117	1	3.20	.912	—	—	—	—	—	—	—	—
1994–95	Binghamton Rangers	AHL	26	12	10	2	1472	81	1	3.30	.894	11	6	5	663	29	1	2.62	.916
1995–96	New York Rangers	NHL	1	0	0	0	27	0	0	0.00	1.000	—	—	—	—	—	—	—	—
1995–96	Binghamton Rangers	AHL	40	18	16	3	2262	151	1	4.01	.868	1	0	0	34	1	0	1.75	.947
1996–97	Kentucky Thoroughblades	AHL	50	25	19	5	2937	161	4	3.29	.903	1	0	1	60	3	0	3.00	.919
1997–98	Kentucky Thoroughblades	AHL	44	17	18	5	2553	124	3	2.91	.906	—	—	—	—	—	—	—	—
1997–98	Utah Grizzlies	IHL	7	3	4	0	398	24	0	3.61	.870	1	0	1	59	3	0	3.04	.900
1998–99	Cincinnati Mighty Ducks	AHL	35	14	19	1	1916	109	2	3.41	.893	—	—	—	—	—	—	—	—
1999–00	Canadian National Team	Intl	32	14	12	4	1759	80	0	2.73	.916	—	—	—	—	—	—	—	—
2000–01	Sapporo Snow Brand	JIHL	39	—	—	—	2379	108	—	2.72	.899	8	—	—	461	25	—	3.25	.895
2001–02	Jokerit	FIN	37	16	11	7	2165	61	5	1.69	.936	2	1	1	101	5	0	2.97	.865
2002–03	Brynäs IF	SWE	40	—	—	—	2344	118	0	3.02	.888	10	—	—	—	—	—	2.67	.888
2003–04	Severstal Cherepovets	RSL	7	2	2	0	319	15	1	2.82	.890	—	—	—	—	—	—	—	—
2003–04	Severstal Cherepovets-2	RUS-3	3	—	—	—	180	4	—	1.33	—	—	—	—	—	—	—	—	—
2003–04	Amur Khabarovsk	RSL	15	3	9	1	835	35	1	2.51	.891	—	—	—	—	—	—	—	—
NHL totals			1	0	0	0	27	0	0	0.00	1.000	—	—	—	—	—	—	—	—

== Awards and honors ==
Award	Year
All-WCHA Rookie Team	1990–91
All-WCHA First Team	1992–93
AHCA West First-Team All-American	1992–93
All-WCHA First Team	1993–94
AHCA West First-Team All-American	1993–94

== See also ==
- List of players who played only one game in the NHL
