= Yegor Podomatsky =

Russian ice hockey player

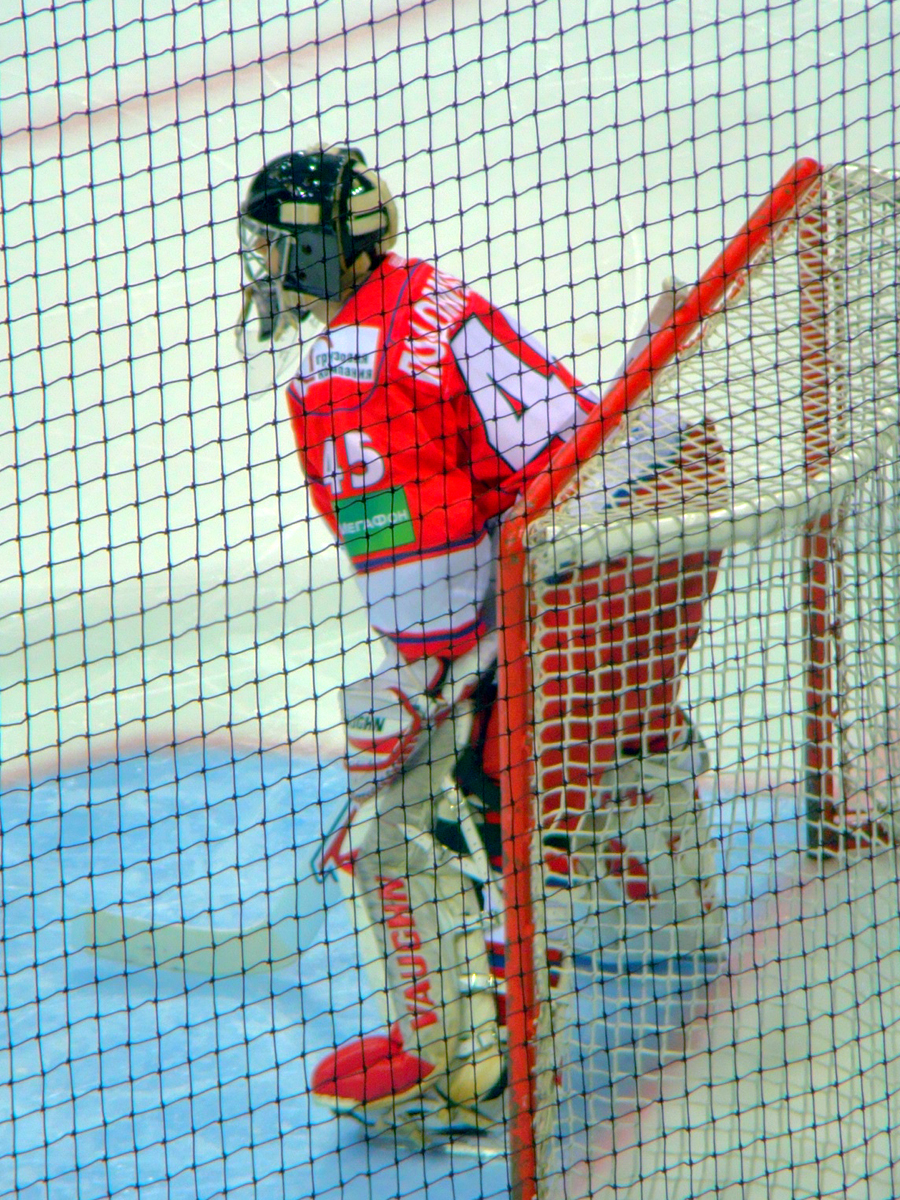
- Born: November 22, 1976 (age 49) Rybinsk, URS
- Height: 5 ft 10 in (178 cm)
- Weight: 181 lb (82 kg; 12 st 13 lb)
- Position: Goaltender
- Caught: Left
- RHL team: Angarsk Yermak
- National team: Russia
- Playing career: 1995–2013

Yegor Podomatsky
Medal record

Men's ice hockey

Olympic Games
Bronze medal – third place	2002 Salt Lake City	Team

World Championships
Silver medal – second place	2002 IHW Championship	Team

Yegor Gennadievich Podomatsky (Russian: Егор Геннадьевич Подомацкий; born November 22, 1976, in Rybinsk, Soviet Union, now Russia) is a Russian professional ice hockey goaltender. His first name is sometimes transliterated as Egor.

== Awards ==
- RHL Rookie of the Year: 1996–1997
- Best RHL Goaltender of the Year : 1996–1997, 1997–1998, 2001–2002, 2002–2003

== International play ==
Played for Russia in:

- 1998 Ice Hockey World Championship
- 1999 Ice Hockey World Championship
- 1999 Baltica Cup
- 2000 Ice Hockey World Championship
- 2002 Ice Hockey World Championship (silver medal)
- 2002 Winter Olympics (bronze medal)
- 2003 Ice Hockey World Championship
- 2003 Sweden Hockey Games
