= Alexei Koznev =

Russian ice hockey player

- Position: Forward
- KHL team: Vityaz Chekhov
- National team: Russia
- Playing career: 1992–present

Alexei Koznev (born October 3, 1975) is a Russian professional ice hockey Forward who currently plays for Vityaz Chekhov of the Kontinental Hockey League (KHL).
