= Maxim Sushinsky =

Russian ice hockey player (born 1974)

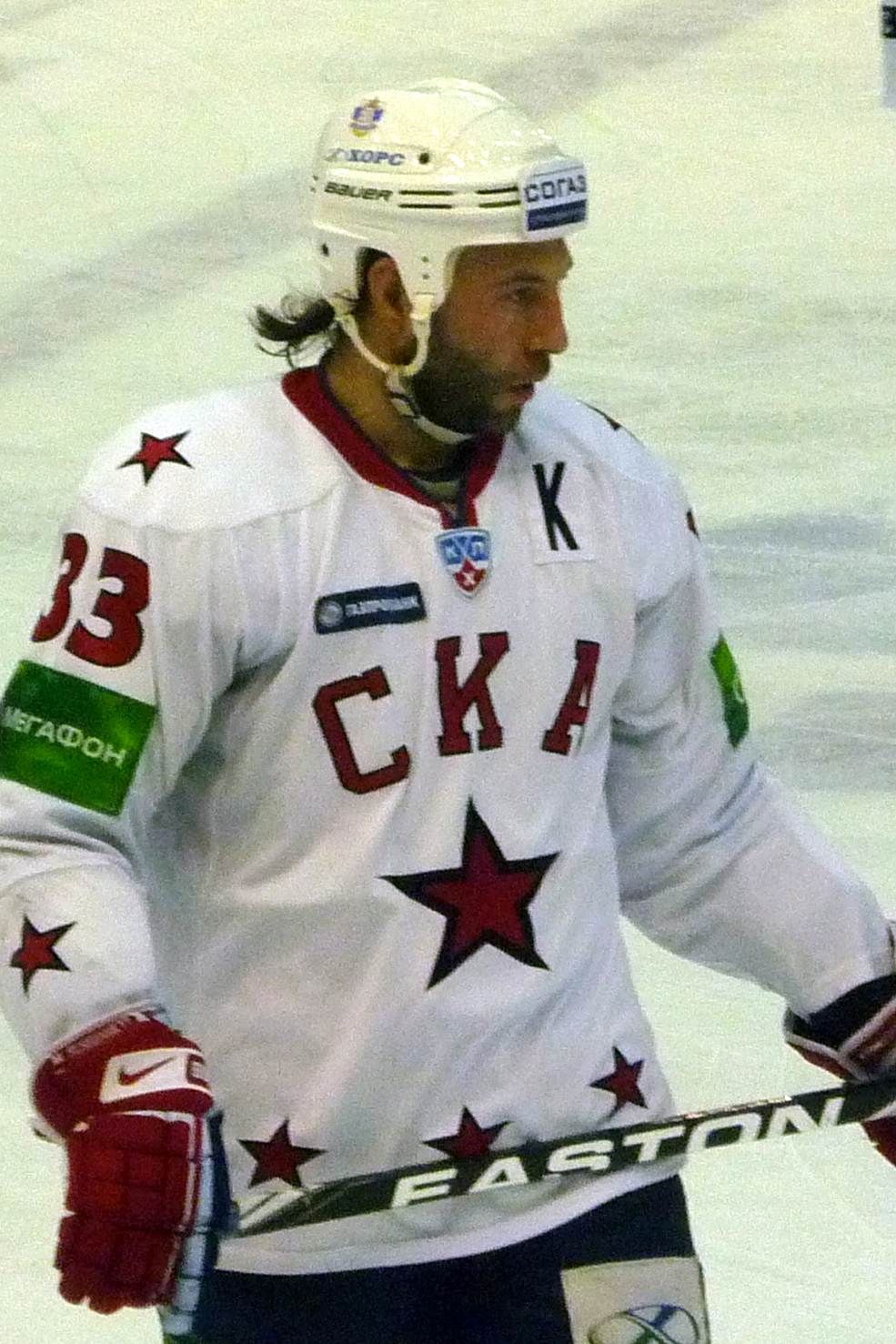
- Born: July 1, 1974 (age 51) Leningrad, Soviet Union
- Height: 5 ft 9 in (175 cm)
- Weight: 179 lb (81 kg; 12 st 11 lb)
- Position: Right wing
- Shot: Left
- Played for: SKA Saint Petersburg; Avangard Omsk; Minnesota Wild; Dynamo Moscow; Salavat Yulaev Ufa; Metallurg Magnitogorsk; HC Fribourg-Gottéron
- National team: Russia
- NHL draft: 132nd overall, 2000; Minnesota Wild
- Playing career: 1991–2013

Maxim Yuryevich Sushinsky (Russian: Максим Юрьевич Сушинский; born July 1, 1974) is a Russian former professional ice hockey player. He played in the Kontinental Hockey League (KHL) and with the Minnesota Wild in the National Hockey League (NHL). His last name is sometimes transliterated as Sushinski or Sushinskiy.

== Playing career ==
A skillful right winger, Sushinsky was drafted 132nd overall in the 2000 NHL entry draft by the Minnesota Wild, and played 30 games with the Wild before leaving the team for personal and family reasons.

Sushinsky has spent the majority of his career in playing in Russia, spending time with Avangard Omsk, HC Dynamo Moscow, and his current team SKA St. Petersburg in the Kontinental Hockey League.

Sushinsky represented the Russian Federation in the 2006 Winter Olympics, where he had five points in eight games played. Throughout the event the nameplate on the back of his jersey had his name spelled as "Sushinksky".

== Personal life ==
Before the 2006 Olympic Games, Sushinsky joined United Russia.

== Career statistics ==
=== Regular season and playoffs ===
			Regular season					Playoffs
Season	Team	League	GP	G	A	Pts	PIM	GP	G	A	Pts	PIM
1990–91	SKA Leningrad	URS	3	0	1	1	0	—	—	—	—	—
1990–91	SKA–2 Leningrad	URS.3	8	1	0	1	0	—	—	—	—	—
1991–92	SKA St. Petersburg	CIS.2	45	5	3	8	16	—	—	—	—	—
1991–92	SKA–2 St. Petersburg	CIS.3	20	14	1	15	38	—	—	—	—	—
1992–93	SKA St. Petersburg	IHL	23	2	3	5	22	6	2	1	3	2
1992–93	SKA St. Petersburg	RUS.2	17	11	7	18	21	—	—	—	—	—
1993–94	SKA St. Petersburg	IHL	45	7	4	11	26	—	—	—	—	—
1994–95	SKA St. Petersburg	IHL	52	11	11	22	57	3	1	0	1	6
1995–96	SKA St. Petersburg	IHL	49	21	15	36	43	2	0	0	0	0
1996–97	Avangard Omsk	RSL	39	20	16	36	24	5	3	1	4	0
1997–98	Avangard Omsk	RSL	20	6	11	17	6	—	—	—	—	—
1998–99	Avangard Omsk	RSL	41	15	16	31	46	5	3	1	4	10
1999–2000	Avangard Omsk	RSL	37	19	24	43	58	8	2	5	7	6
2000–01	Minnesota Wild	NHL	30	7	4	11	29	—	—	—	—	—
2000–01	Avangard Omsk	RSL	12	5	3	8	14	13	9	4	13	12
2001–02	Avangard Omsk	RSL	46	19	32	51	60	11	6	11	17	18
2002–03	Avangard Omsk	RSL	37	15	19	34	76	12	4	4	8	2
2003–04	Avangard Omsk	RSL	54	20	41	61	46	11	2	6	8	18
2004–05	Avangard Omsk	RSL	50	18	37	55	64	11	5	7	12	24
2005–06	Dynamo Moscow	RSL	39	11	21	32	44	2	1	1	2	4
2006–07	SKA St. Petersburg	RSL	54	14	29	43	88	3	1	0	1	2
2007–08	SKA St. Petersburg	RSL	56	22	29	51	65	9	2	2	4	8
2008–09	SKA St. Petersburg	KHL	48	18	27	46	83	3	1	0	1	2
2009–10	SKA St. Petersburg	KHL	56	27	38	65	87	4	2	2	4	4
2010–11	SKA St. Petersburg	KHL	50	16	23	39	48	11	2	7	9	12
2011–12	Salavat Yulaev Ufa	KHL	25	6	10	16	32	—	—	—	—	—
2011–12	Toros Neftekamsk	VHL	2	1	2	3	0	—	—	—	—	—
2011–12	Metallurg Magnitogorsk	KHL	24	3	9	12	16	11	3	3	6	4
2012–13	HC Fribourg–Gottéron	NLA	3	1	2	3	0	4	0	1	1	0
IHL totals			169	41	33	74	148	11	3	1	4	8
RSL totals			485	184	278	462	575	90	38	42	80	104
KHL totals			203	70	107	177	266	29	8	11	19	22

=== International ===
Year	Team	Event	Result	GP	G	A	Pts	PIM
1994	Russia	WJC	3rd place, bronze medalist(s)	7	4	2	6	10
1999	Russia	WC	5th	6	1	2	3	4
2000	Russia	WC	11th	6	3	1	4	0
2002	Russia	WC	2nd place, silver medalist(s)	9	3	4	7	4
2004	Russia	WC	10th	6	2	1	3	12
2006	Russia	OG	4th	8	2	3	5	8
2006	Russia	WC	5th	7	2	4	6	0
2008	Russia	WC	1st place, gold medalist(s)	9	4	1	5	6
2010	Russia	WC	2nd place, silver medalist(s)	5	0	1	1	8
Senior totals				56	17	17	34	42
