= Dušan Salfický =

Czech ice hockey player

- Born: March 28, 1972 (age 54) Chrudim, Czechoslovakia
- Height: 6 ft 1 in (185 cm)
- Weight: 185 lb (84 kg; 13 st 3 lb)
- Position: Goaltender
- Caught: Left
- Played for: HC Pardubice; HC Plzeň; Bridgeport Sound Tigers; HC CSKA Moscow; Severstal Cherepovets; Khimik Mytishchi; HC Sparta Praha; Torpedo Nizhny Novgorod; HC Karlovy Vary
- National team: Czech Republic
- NHL draft: 132nd overall, 2001; New York Islanders
- Playing career: 1990–2014

Dušan Salfický (born 28 March 1972 in Chrudim, Czechoslovakia) is a Czech former professional ice hockey goaltender. He was drafted 132nd overall by the National Hockey League's New York Islanders in the 2001 NHL entry draft but only played 4 games for the Islander's American Hockey League farm team, the Bridgeport Sound Tigers.
