= 2000 Baltika Cup =

Tournament details
- Host country: Russia
- City: Moscow
- Venue: 1 (in 1 host city)
- Dates: 17–20 December 2000
- Teams: 5

Final positions
- Champions: Russia (7th title)
- Runners-up: Czech Republic
- Third place: Finland
- Fourth place: Sweden

Tournament statistics
- Games played: 6
- Goals scored: 32 (5.33 per game)
- Attendance: 33,030 (5,505 per game)
- Scoring leader: (Czech Republic) Kamil Piroš (6 points)

Awards
- MVP: (Russia) Dmitri Kvartalnov

The 2000 Baltika Cup was played between 17 and 20 December 2000. The Czech Republic, Finland, Sweden and Russia played a round-robin for a total of three games per team and six games in total. All of the matches were played in Luzhniki Palace of Sports in Moscow, Russia. Russia won the tournament. The tournament was part of the 2000–01 Euro Hockey Tour.

== Standings ==
Pos	Team	Pld	W	OTW	SOW	OTL	SOL	L	GF	GA	GD	Pts
1	Russia	3	2	0	1	0	0	0	8	5	+3	8
2	Czech Republic	3	2	0	0	0	1	0	14	9	+5	7
3	Finland	3	1	0	0	0	0	2	7	9	−2	3
4	Sweden	3	0	0	0	0	0	3	3	9	−6	0

Source: swehockey

== Games ==
All times are local. Moscow – (Moscow Time – UTC+4)

17 December 2000; 13:00	Finland	1-2 (0-1, 0-0, 1-1)	Russia	Luzhniki Palace of Sports, Moscow; Attendance: 9,000

Game reference

Kimmo Kapanen
Goalies
Viktor Chistov

	0-1	04:03 – Evstafiev (Orekhovsky, Razin)
Hyvönen (Immonen, Pakaslahti) – 44:41	1-1
	1-2	44:54 – Razin (Gorbushin)

10 min
Penalties
8 min
14
Shots
23

17 December 2000; 17:00	Sweden	2-4 (1-1, 0-1, 1-2)	Czech Republic	Luzhniki Palace of Sports, Moscow; Attendance: 5,300

Game reference

Stefan Liv
Goalies
Dušan Salfický
Referee:
(Russia) Leonid Vaisfeld
Linesmen:
(Russia) Biryukov
(Russia) Chimic

	0-1	06:11 – Hübl (Vostřák)
Sundin (Johansson, Falk) – 10:19	1-1
	1-2	23:18 – Piroš (Vlasák)
	1-3	43:06 – Ujčík (Piroš)
Hedin (Olsson, Molin) – 47:55	2-3
	2-4	44:37 – Kotalík

6 min
Penalties
12 min
37
Shots
18

18 December 2000; 14:30	Sweden	1-4 (3-2, 3-0, 0-0)	Finland	Luzhniki Palace of Sports, Moscow; Attendance: 1,050

Game reference

Andreas Hadelöv
Goalies
Kimmo Kapanen
Referee:
(Russia) Sergei Karabanov
Linesmen:
(Russia) Sergei Kulakov
(Russia) Anatoly Zakharov

Falk (Sundin, Andreas Salomonsson) – 08:47	1-0
	1-1	23:07 – Miettinen (Pirnes, Puistola)
	1-2	39:01 – Hassinen (Immonen)
	1-3	42:22 – Joenväärä (Kauppinen)
	1-4	52:32 – Hagman (Pirnes, Miettinen)

18 min
Penalties
14 min
13
Shots
21

18 December 2000; 18:30	Russia	5-4 GWS (1-2, 1-2, 2-0) (OT: 0–0) (SO: 1–0)	Czech Republic	Luzhniki Palace of Sports, Moscow; Attendance: 6,500

Game reference

Viktor Chistov
Goalies
Martin Prusek
Referee:
(Sweden) Ulf Rådbjer
Linesmen:
(Russia) Biryukov
(Russia) Chimic

	0-1	04:31 – Piroš
Karpov (Kozlov) – 07:30	1-1
	1-2	08:23 – Matějovský (Kubinčák, Kotalík)
	1-3	26:35 – Hübl (Vostřák)
	1-4	28:58 – Ujčík (Piroš, Vlasák)
Kvartalnov (Bykov, Datsyuk) – 36:27	2-4
Karpov (Razin, Afinogenov) – 43:46	3-4
Karpov (Evstafiev) – 57:15	4-4

Karpov
Shootout

10 min
Penalties
24 min
41
Shots
19

20 December 2000; 14:30	Czech Republic	6-2 (3-2, 3-0, 0-0)	Finland	Luzhniki Palace of Sports, Moscow; Attendance: 2,180

Game reference

Dušan Salfický
Goalies
Jussi Markkanen
Referee:
(Russia) Mikhail Buturlin
Linesmen:
(Russia) Sergei Kulakov
(Russia) Anatoly Zakharov

	0-1	03:03 – Hyvönen (Palsola)
	0-2	06:29 – Immonen (Hyvönen, Pisto)
J.Hlinka (Martínek, Hübl) – 11:18	1-2
Piroš (Tesařík, Vlasák) – 16:47	2-2
J.Hlinka (Píša, Hübl) – 17:49	3-2
Piroš (Vlasák) – 17:18	4-2
Sýkora (J.Kudrna) – 29:24	5-2
Matějovský (Čajánek, Salfický) – 34:15	6-2

14 min
Penalties
12 min
34
Shots
20

20 December 2000; 18:30	Russia	1-0 (0-0, 1-0, 0-0)	Sweden	Luzhniki Palace of Sports, Moscow; Attendance: 9,000

Game reference
Andreas Hadelöv	Goalies	Vadim Tarasov	Referee: (Czech Republic) Vladimír Šindler; Linesmen: (Russia) Makarov (Russia) Sergei Shelyanin
Datsyuk (Kvartalnov) – 22:33 / 1-0			Referee: (Czech Republic) Vladimír Šindler; Linesmen: (Russia) Makarov (Russia) Sergei Shelyanin
10 min	Penalties	12 min	Referee: (Czech Republic) Vladimír Šindler; Linesmen: (Russia) Makarov (Russia) Sergei Shelyanin
21	Shots	18	Referee: (Czech Republic) Vladimír Šindler; Linesmen: (Russia) Makarov (Russia) Sergei Shelyanin

== Scoring leaders ==
Pos	Player	Country	GP	G	A	Pts	+/−	PIM	POS
1	Kamil Piroš	Czech Republic	3	4	2	6	+4	0	F
2	Valeri Karpov	Russia	3	4	0	4	+5	0	F
3	Viktor Hübl	Czech Republic	3	2	2	4	+4	0	F
3	Tomáš Vlasák	Czech Republic	3	0	4	4	+4	0	F
5	Hannes Hyvönen	Finland	3	2	1	3	+1	0	F

GP = Games played; G = Goals; A = Assists; Pts = Points; +/− = Plus/minus; PIM = Penalties in minutes; POS = Position
Source: quanthockey

== Goaltending leaders ==
Pos	Player	Country	TOI	GA	GAA	Sv%	SO
1	Vadim Tarasov	Russia	96:00	0	0.00	100.00	1
2	Jussi Markkanen	Finland	60:00	1	1.00	93.33	0
3	Dušan Salfický	Czech Republic	120:00	4	2.00	92.98	0
4	Martin Prusek	Czech Republic	65:00	5	4.62	88.64	0
5	Andreas Hadelöv	Sweden	119:00	5	2.52	88.10	0
6	Kimmo Kapanen	Finland	120:00	8	4.00	85.45	0
7	Viktor Chistov	Russia	89:00	5	3.37	80.00	0
8	Stefan Liv	Sweden	60:00	4	4.00	77.78	0

TOI = Time on ice (minutes:seconds); SA = Shots against; GA = Goals against; GAA = Goals Against Average; Sv% = Save percentage; SO = Shutouts
Source: swehockey

== Tournament awards ==
The tournament directorate named the following players in the tournament 2000:

- Best goaltender: (Czech Republic) Dušan Salfický
- Best defenceman: (Finland) Ilkka Mikkola
- Best forward: (Russia) Valeri Karpov
- Most Valuable Player: (Russia) Dmitri Kvartalnov
