= 2000 Karjala Tournament =

2000 Karjala Tournament II
Tournament details
- Host countries: Finland; Sweden
- Cities: Helsinki; Jönköping
- Venues: 2 (in 2 host cities)
- Dates: 9-12 November 2000
- Teams: 4

Final positions
- Champions: Finland (4th title)
- Runners-up: Sweden
- Third place: Russia
- Fourth place: Czech Republic

Tournament statistics
- Games played: 6
- Goals scored: 27 (4.5 per game)
- Attendance: 41,531 (6,922 per game)
- Scoring leader: (Finland) Jukka Hentunen (5 points)

The 2000 Karjala Tournament was played between 9 and 12 November 2000. The Czech Republic, Finland, Sweden and Russia played a round-robin for a total of three games per team and six games in total. One game was played in Kinnarps Arena, Jönköping, Sweden (Sweden vs Czech Republic ) all the other games was played in Hartwall Areena, Helsinki. Finland won the tournament. The tournament was part of the 2000–01 Euro Hockey Tour.

== Standings ==
Pos	Team	Pld	W	OTW	OTL	L	GF	GA	GD	Pts
1	Finland	3	2	1	0	0	12	5	+7	8
2	Sweden	3	2	0	0	1	7	7	0	6
3	Russia	3	1	0	0	2	5	7	−2	3
4	Czech Republic	3	0	0	1	2	3	8	−5	1

Source: hokej

== Games ==
All times are local. Helsinki – (Eastern European Time – UTC+2) Jöpköping– (Central European Time – UTC+1)

9 November 2000; 17:00	Sweden	4-1 (1-0, 3-0, 0-1)	Czech Republic	Kinnarps Arena, Jönköping; Attendance: 5,991

Game reference

Mikael Tellqvist
Goalies
Zdeněk Orct
Referee:
(Finland) Timo Favorin
Linesmen:
(Sweden) Karlsson
(Sweden) Ulf Lindgren

M.Johansson (A.Johansson) – 11:16	1-0
Salomonsson (Wernblom) – 20:27	2-0
Rohlin (Salomonsson, Gahn) – 30:57	3-0
Rohlin (Huselius, Ahlström) – 35:14	4-0
	4-1	56:58 – Čajánek (Vostřák, Martínek)

6 min
Penalties
20 min
30
Shots
30

9 November 2000; 18:00	Finland	4-3 (2-0, 0-0, 2-3)	Russia	Hartwall Areena, Helsinki; Attendance: 7,126

Game reference

Pasi Nurminen
Goalies
Viktor Chistov

Hentunen (Nurminen) – 13:42	1-0
Palsola (Virta) – 19:04	2-0
Pärssinen (Kapanen) – 42:43	3-0
Miettinen (Virta, Alanko) – 54:11	4-0
	4-1	45:40 – Gusmanov (Razin)
	4-2	43:11 – Karpov (Prokopyev)
	4-3	59:51 – Orekhovsky (Prokopyev, Karpov)

28 min
Penalties
15 min
34
Shots
32

11 November 2000; 15:00	Russia	0-2 (0-1, 0-1, 0-0)	Sweden	Hartwall Areena, Helsinki; Attendance: 2,853

Game reference
Alexei Ivashkin	Goalies	Mikael Tellqvist	Referee: (Finland) Kruus; Linesmen: (Finland) Lindfors (Finland) Saarnio
0-1 / 13:55; 0-2 / 32:09 – Salomonsson (M.Johansson)			Referee: (Finland) Kruus; Linesmen: (Finland) Lindfors (Finland) Saarnio
10 min	Penalties	8 min	Referee: (Finland) Kruus; Linesmen: (Finland) Lindfors (Finland) Saarnio
16	Shots	32	Referee: (Finland) Kruus; Linesmen: (Finland) Lindfors (Finland) Saarnio

11 November 2000; 18:30	Czech Republic	1-2 OT (0-1, 0-0, 1-0) (OT: 0–1)	Finland	Hartwall Areena, Helsinki; Attendance: 12,018

Game reference

Dušan Salfický
Goalies
Pasi Nurminen
Referee:
(Russia) Leonid Vaisfeld
Linesmen:
(Finland) Erik Hämäläinen
(Finland) Jyri-Petteri Rönn

	0-1	03:05 – Järventie (Hentunen, Pärssinen)
Vostřák (Zábranský, Hübl) – 55:24	1-1
	1-2	65:00 – Hentunen

10 min
Penalties
4 min
29
Shots
28

12 November 2000; 15:00	Czech Republic	1-2 (1-1, 0-1, 0-0)	Russia	Hartwall Areena, Helsinki; Attendance: 2,177

Game reference

Dušan Salfický
Goalies
Viktor Chistov
Referee:
(Sweden) Andersson
Linesmen:
(Finland) Timo Favorin
(Finland) Peltonen

Procházka (Reichel) – 11:53	1-0
	1-1	15:35 – Razin (Petrochinin)
	1-2	29:30 – Razin ([[[Yevgeni Petrochinin|Petrochinin]], Golev)

26 min
Penalties
12 min
28
Shots
19

12 November 2000; 18:30	Finland	6-1 (2-1, 3-0, 1-0)	Sweden	Hartwall Areena, Helsinki; Attendance: 11,366

Game reference

Jarmo Myllys
Goalies
Mikael Tellqvist
Referee:
(Russia) Leonid Vaisfeld
Linesmen:
(Finland) Bruun
(Sweden) Åberg

	0-1	08:05 – Mathias Johansson (Mikael Johansson, Andreas Johansson)
Pärssinen (Kapanen, Järventie) – 14:12	1-1
Koivisto (Hentunen, Järventie) – 19:16	2-1
Viitakoski – 21:40	3-1
Virta (Palsola) – 27:03	4-1
Rintanen (Petriläinen) – 34:08	5-1
Pärssinen (Kapanen, Hentunen) – 45:40	6-1

20 min
Penalties
14 min
30
Shots
24

== Scoring leaders ==
Pos	Player	Country	GP	G	A	Pts	POS
1	Jukka Hentunen	Finland	3	2	3	5	F
2	Andreas Salomonsson	Sweden	3	3	1	4	F
2	Juuso Pärssinen	Sweden	3	3	1	4	F
4	Andrei Razin	Russia	3	2	1	3	F
5	Tony Virta	Finland	3	1	2	3	F
5	Martti Järventie	Finland	3	1	2	3	F

GP = Games played; G = Goals; A = Assists; Pts = Points; +/− = Plus/minus; PIM = Penalties in minutes; POS = Position
Source: swehockey

== Goaltending leaders ==
Pos	Player	Country	TOI	GA	GAA	Sv%	SO
1	Jarmo Myllys	Finland	65:00	1	0.92	96.97	0
2	Alexei Ivashkin	Russia	60:00	2	2.00	93.75	0
3	Dušan Salfický	Czech Republic	125:00	4	1.92	92.86	0
3	Pasi Nurminen	Finland	120:00	4	2.00	92.86	0
5	Viktor Chistov	Russia	120:00	5	2.50	91.94	0
6	Mikael Tellqvist	Sweden	160:00	6	2.25	91.18	1
7	Zdeněk Orct	Czech Republic	60:00	4	4.00	86.67	0

TOI = Time on ice (minutes:seconds); SA = Shots against; GA = Goals against; GAA = Goals Against Average; Sv% = Save percentage; SO = Shutouts
Source: swehockey

== Tournament awards ==
The tournament directorate named the following players in the tournament 2000:

Media All-Star Team A:

- Goaltender: (Sweden) Mikael Tellqvist
- Defence: (Sweden) Leif Rohlin, (Finland) Martti Järventie
- Forwards: (Finland) Jukka Hentunen, (Sweden) Andreas Salomonsson, (Finland) Juuso Pärssinen

Media All-Star Team B:

- Goaltender: (Finland) Jarmo Myllys
- Defence: (Finland) Marko Kiprusoff, (Sweden) Niklas Olausson
- Forwards: (Czech Republic) Pavel Vostřák, (Russia) Andrei Razin, (Finland) Kimmo Rintanen
