= 2001 Baltika Cup =

Tournament details
- Host country: Russia
- City: Moscow
- Venue: 1 (in 1 host city)
- Dates: 18–22 December 2001
- Teams: 5

Final positions
- Champions: Czech Republic (2nd title)
- Runners-up: Russia
- Third place: Sweden
- Fourth place: Finland

Tournament statistics
- Games played: 6
- Goals scored: 33 (5.5 per game)
- Attendance: 23,450 (3,908 per game)
- Scoring leader: (Czech Republic) Petr Čajánek (4 points)

Awards
- MVP: (Czech Republic) Petr Čajánek

The 2001 Baltika Cup was played between 18 and 22 December 2001. The Czech Republic, Finland, Sweden and Russia played a round-robin for a total of three games per team and six games in total. All of the matches were played in Luzhniki Palace of Sports in Moscow, Russia. Czech Republic won the tournament. The tournament was part of the 2001–02 Euro Hockey Tour.

== Standings ==
Pos	Team	Pld	W	OTW	SOW	OTL	SOL	L	GF	GA	GD	Pts
1	Czech Republic	3	2	0	1	0	0	0	12	5	+7	8
2	Russia	3	1	0	1	0	0	1	6	8	−2	5
3	Sweden	3	0	0	1	0	1	1	8	10	−2	3
4	Finland	3	0	0	0	0	2	1	7	11	−4	2

Source: swehockey

== Games ==
All times are local. Moscow – (Moscow Time – UTC+4)

18 December 2001; 15:00	Czech Republic	4-3 GWS (0-1, 2-1, 1-1) (OT: 0-0) (SO: 1-0)	Sweden	Luzhniki Palace of Sports, Moscow; Attendance: 2,150

Game reference

Referee:
(Russia) Sergej Semenov

	0-1	01:55 – Melin (Davidsson)
	0-2	21:34 – Artursson (Söderström)
Leška (Štrba) – 30:20	1-2
Rosa – 34:10	2-2
Sedlák (Rosa, Kucharčík) – 50:09	3-2
	3-3	57:31 – Johansson (Andersson)

6 min
Penalties
6 min
25
Shots
29

18 December 2001; 18:30	Russia	3-2 GWS (1-1, 1-1, 0-0) (OT: 0-0) (SO: 1-0)	Finland	Luzhniki Palace of Sports, Moscow

Game reference

Vasiliev (Koznev) – 02:56	1-0
	1-1	16:48 – Koskenkorva (Tukio, Pirjetä)
	1-2	21:15 – Mäntylä (Pesonen, Hassinen)
Savchenkov (Razin, Golts) – 31:53	2-2

Karpov
Shootout

20 December 2001; 15:00	Finland	2-4 (0-0, 1-2, 1-2)	Czech Republic	Luzhniki Palace of Sports, Moscow; Attendance: 2,500

Game reference

Referee:
(Russia) Sergei Karabanov

	0-1	21:46 – Čajánek (Štrba) (PP)
Tukio (Pirjetä) (PP) – 26:30	1-1
	1-2	32:09 – Gureň (Čajánek, Nosek)
	1-3	50:27 – Mudroch (Posmyk, Patera)
Pesonen (Pirjetä) (PP) – 59:17	2-3
	2-4	59:51 – Ujčík (Čajánek)

14 min
Penalties
24 min
29
Shots
38

20 December 2001; 18:30	Sweden	1-3 (1-0, 0-1, 0-2)	Russia	Luzhniki Palace of Sports, Moscow; Attendance: 7,700

Game reference

Davidsson (Johnson) – 07:41	1-0
	1-1	34:33 – Torgayev (Sushinsky) (PP)
	1-2	49:15 – Gorokhov (Torgayev)
	1-3	59:50 – Razin

24 min
Penalties
2 min
13
Shots
19

21 December 2001; 18:30	Finland	3-4 GWS (0-2, 2-1, 1-0) (OT: 0–0) (SO: 0–1)	Sweden	Luzhniki Palace of Sports, Moscow; Attendance: 2,600

Game reference

Referee:
(Russia) Sergei Karabanov

	0-1	03:27 – Nordström (Johansson)
	0-2	19:09 – Johnson (Weinhandl, Johansson)
	0-3	23:58 – Johnson (Weinhandl) (PP)
Turunen (Pirnes) – 27:34	1-3
Viinanen (Maattanen, Kakko) – 28:54	2-3
Niskala (Pirjetä) – 47:30	3-3

Shootout
Weinhandl

22 December 2001; 13:00	Russia	0-4 (0-3, 0-1, 0-0)	Czech Republic	Luzhniki Palace of Sports, Moscow; Attendance: 8,500

Game reference

Referee:
(Sweden) Lars Johan Ryhed

0-1	06:21 – Balaštík (Čech, Leška) (PP)
0-2	07:45 – Kucharčík (Ujčík)
0-3	12:34 – Balaštík (Leška)
0-4	36:21 – Rosa (Čajánek)

10 min
Penalties
24 min
34
Shots
31

== Scoring leaders ==
Pos	Player	Country	GP	G	A	Pts	+/−	PIM	POS
1	Petr Čajánek	Czech Republic	3	1	3	4	+3	2	F
2	Lasse Pirjetä	Finland	3	0	4	4	-1	0	F
3	Pavel Rosa	Czech Republic	3	2	1	3	+1	0	F
3	Jonas Johnson	Sweden	3	2	1	3	-2	2	F
5	Johan Davidsson	Sweden	3	2	1	3	+1	2	F

GP = Games played; G = Goals; A = Assists; Pts = Points; +/− = Plus/minus; PIM = Penalties in minutes; POS = Position
Source: quanthockey

== Tournament awards ==
The tournament directorate named the following players in the tournament 2001:

- Best goaltender: (Czech Republic) Jiří Trvaj
- Best defenceman: (Sweden) Ronnie Sundin
- Best forward: (Russia) Pavel Torgayev
- Most Valuable Player: (Czech Republic) Petr Čajánek
