= 2001 Česká pojišťovna Cup =

2001 Česká Pojišťovna Cup
Tournament details
- Host countries: Czech Republic; Finland
- Cities: Zlín; Helsinki
- Venues: 2 (in 2 host cities)
- Dates: 6–9 September 2001
- Teams: 4

Final positions
- Champions: Finland (3rd title)
- Runners-up: Russia
- Third place: Sweden
- Fourth place: Czech Republic

Tournament statistics
- Games played: 6
- Goals scored: 32 (5.33 per game)
- Attendance: 22,563 (3,761 per game)
- Scoring leader: (Russia) Dmitry Zatonsky (4 points)

The 2001 Česká Pojišťovna Cup was played between 6 and 9 September 2001. The Czech Republic, Finland, Sweden and Russia played a round-robin for a total of three games per team and six games in total. Five of the matches were played in Zimní stadion Luďka Čajky in Zlín, Czech Republic, and one match in Hartwall Areena in Helsinki, Finland. The tournament was won by the Finland. The tournament was part of 2001–02 Euro Hockey Tour.

== Standings ==
Pos	Team	Pld	W	OTW	OTL	L	GF	GA	GD	Pts
1	Finland	3	3	0	0	0	9	3	+6	9
2	Russia	3	0	2	0	1	10	9	+1	4
3	Sweden	3	1	0	1	1	8	9	−1	4
4	Czech Republic	3	0	0	2	1	5	11	−6	2

Source: swehockey

== Games ==
All times are local. Zlín – (Central European Time – UTC+1) Helsinki – (Eastern European Time – UTC+2)

6 September 2001; 17:00	Czech Republic	4-5 GWS (1-1, 1-1, 2-2) (OT: 0–0) (SO: 0–1)	Russia	Zimní stadion Luďka Čajky, Zlín; Attendance: 4,500

Game reference

Vladimír Hudáček
Goalies
Maxim Sokolov
Referee:
(Finland) Timo Favorin

09:52 – Petr Sýkora (Kamil Brabenec, Mario Cartelli)	1-0
	1-1	13:00 – Alexander Gulyavtsev (Vadim Epanchintsev, Evgeny Petrochinin)
28:20 – David Moravec (Michal Sýkora)	2-1
	2-2	39:42 – Dmitry Zatonsky (Alexander Prokopyev)
	2-3	45:41 – Alexei Tertyshny (Yevgeny Fyodorov)
46:19 – Jaroslav Hlinka (Michal Sýkora, David Moravec)	3-3
48:05 – Petr Sýkora	4-3
	4-4	54:07 – Dmitry Zatonsky (Maxim Sushinsky)

Shootout
Sushinsky
18 min
Penalties
18 min
48
Shots
29

6 September 2001; 18:30	Finland	4-2 (0-1, 0-0, 4-1)	Sweden	Hartwall Areena, Helsinki; Attendance: 4,357

Game reference

Fredrik Norrena
Goalies
Andreas Hadelöv
Referee:
(Czech Republic) Vladimir Sindler

	0-1	03:05 – Christopher Ottosson (Mikael Håkanson, Henrik Zetterberg)
43:40 – Tom Koivisto (Mika Alatalo)	1-1
	1-2	44:33 – Mattias Weinhandl (Jonas Johnson, Niklas Andersson)
49:42 – Niklas Hedberg (Antti Miettinen, Esa pirnes)	2-2
51:37 – Mika Alatalo (Juha Lind, Petri Pakaslahti)	3-2
58:50 – Juha Lind	4-2

8 min
Penalties
8 min
22
Shots
5

8 September 2001; 13:30	Finland	2-1 (1-1, 1-0, 0-0)	Russia	Zimní stadion Luďka Čajky, Zlín; Attendance: 1,583

Game reference

Fredrik Norrena
Goalies
Maxim Sokolov
Referee:
(Czech Republic) Milan Minář
Linesman:
(Czech Republic) Stanislav Barvíř

08:05 – Petri Pakaslahti (Mika Alatalo)	1-0
	1-1	17:46 – Alexander Golts (Andrei Razin, Valeri Karpov)
33:07 – Eero Somervuori (Tuukka Mäntylä)	2-1

14 min
Penalties
14 min
30
Shots
1

8 September 2001; 17:30	Sweden	3-1 (1-1, 1-0, 1-0)	Czech Republic	Zimní stadion Luďka Čajky, Zlín; Attendance: 5,752

Game reference

Stefan Liv
Goalies
Roman Málek
Referee:
(Russia) Mikhail Buturlin

02:47 – Anders Huusko (Pierre Hedin)	1-0
	1-1	11:17 – Jaroslav Hlinka (David Moravec, Tomáš Kaberle)
26:23 – Niklas Andersson (Magnus Johansson, Mattias Weinhandl)	2-1
59:19 – Anders Burström)	3-1

12 min
Penalties
24 min
39
Shots
24

9 September 2001; 13:30	Russia	4-3 GWS (0-0, 1-1, 2-2) (OT: 0–0) (SO: 1–0)	Sweden	Zimní stadion Luďka Čajky, Zlín; Attendance: 1,456

Game reference
Maxim Sokolov	Goalies	Andreas Hadelöv	Referee: (Finland) Timo Favorin
24:49 – Alexander Yudin (Dmitry Zatonsky); 51:11 – Andrei Skopintsev (Aleksandr Golts, Sergei Vyshedkevich) (PP); 56:28 – Dmitry Zatonsky (Maxim Sushinsky, Alexander Prokopyev) / Goals / 20:26 – Mikael Håkanson (Nichlas Falk, Thomas Johansson) (PP); 40:33 – Jonas Johnsson (Niklas Andersson) (PP); 56:09 – Mathias Johansson (Jörgen Jönsson, Daniel Alfredsson)			Referee: (Finland) Timo Favorin
Karpov	Shootout		Referee: (Finland) Timo Favorin
8 min	Penalties	10 min	Referee: (Finland) Timo Favorin
33	Shots	47	Referee: (Finland) Timo Favorin

9 September 2001; 17:30	Czech Republic	0-3 (0-2, 0-0, 0-1)	Finland	Zimní stadion Luďka Čajky, Zlín; Attendance: 4,915

Game reference

Roman Málek
Goalies
Fredrik Norrena
Referee:
(Russia) Mikhail Buturlin
Linesman:
(Czech Republic) Stanislav Barvíř

0-1	04:48 – Tommi Santala (Mikko Luoma)
0-2	06:32 – Mikko Luoma (Petri Pakaslahti, Juha Lind)
0-3	47:37 – Eero Somervuori (Tuukka Mäntylä, Mikko Luoma)

8 min
Penalties
14 min
37
Shots
22

== Scoring leaders ==
Pos	Player	Country	GP	G	A	Pts	+/−	PIM	POS
1	Dmitry Zatonsky	Russia	3	3	1	4	+3	2	F
2	Mika Alatalo	Finland	3	1	2	3	+4	4	F
3	Niklas Andersson	Sweden	3	1	2	3	+1	0	F
4	Juha Lind	Finland	3	1	2	3	+4	2	F
5	Mikko Luoma	Finland	3	1	2	3	+6	0	D

GP = Games played; G = Goals; A = Assists; Pts = Points; +/− = Plus/minus; PIM = Penalties in minutes; POS = Position
Source: quanthockey
