= 2002 IIHF World Championship final =

Ice hockey match

	1	2	3	Total
Russia	0	1	2	3
Slovakia	2	1	1	4
- Date: May 11, 2002
- Arena: Scandinavium
- City: Gothenburg
- Attendance: 11,591

The 2002 IIHF World Championship final was an ice hockey match that took place on May 11, 2002 in Gothenburg, Sweden, to determine the winner of the 2002 IIHF World Championship. Slovakia defeated Russia to win its first championship.

== Details ==
11 May 2002; 19:00	Russia	3 – 4 (0–2, 1–1, 2–1)	Slovakia	Scandinavium; Attendance: 11,591

Game reference

Sokolov
Goalies
Lašák
Referees:
Pakaslahti
Carpentier, Redding

	0–1	0:22 Višňovský (Stümpel)
	0–2	12:10 Bondra (Šatan, Pálffy)
23:27 Sushinsky (Zatonsky, Prokopiev)	1–2
	1–3	26:59 Šatan (Handzuš)
42:09 Antipov (Karpov)	2–3
54:15 Sushinsky (Prokopiev)	3–3
	3–4	58:20 Bondra (Pálffy)

10 min
Penalties
8 min
21
Shots
21

== See also ==
- 2002 IIHF World Championship
- Slovakia men's national ice hockey team
- Russia men's national ice hockey team
