= Hübl =

Hübl is a surname. Notable people with the surname include:

- Arthur von Hübl (1853–1932), Austrian military officer, chemist and cartographer
  - Hübl Peak in Antarctica named after Arthur von Hübl
- Jaroslav Hübl (disambiguation), multiple people
- Viktor Hübl (born 1978), Czech ice hockey player
