= Tertyshny =

Tertyshny (Russian: Тертышный), feminine: Tertyshnaya is a Russian-language surname. Notable people with the surname include:

- Alexei Tertyshny (born 1977), Russian ice hockey player and coach
- Dmitri Tertyshny (1976–1999), Russian ice hockey player
- Evgeny Tertyshny (1935–2025), Soviet politician and engineer
- Sergey Tertyshny (born 1970), Russian ice hockey player
