= Jaroslav Hübl =

Jaroslav Hübl may refer to:

- Jaroslav Hübl (ice hockey, born 1957), Czech ice hockey player
- Jaroslav Hübl (ice hockey, born 1982), Czech ice hockey player
