= Vostřák =

Vostřák is a Czech surname. Notable people with the surname include:

- Pavel Vostřák (born 1972), Czech ice hockey player
- Zbyněk Vostřák (1920–1985), Czech composer
- Marek Vostřák (Died CERCA 1400), Czech Artist
