= Viinanen =

Viinanen is a Finnish surname. Notable people with the surname include:

- Iiro Viinanen (born 1944), Finnish politician
- Mika Viinanen (born 1979), Finnish ice hockey player
