= Martin Štrba =

Martin Štrba may refer to:

- Martin Štrba (cinematographer)
- Martin Štrba (ice hockey)
