= Järventie =

Järventie is a surname. Notable people with the surname include:

- Martti Järventie (born 1976), Finnish ice hockey defenceman
- Roby Järventie (born 2002), Finnish ice hockey left winger
