= Zatonsky =

Zatonsky (Russian: Затонский) is a surname. Notable people with the surname include:

- Dmitry Zatonsky (born 1971), Russian ice hockey player
- Volodymyr Zatonsky (1888–1938), Soviet academic, politician, and activist
