= Kamil Piroš =

Czech ice hockey player

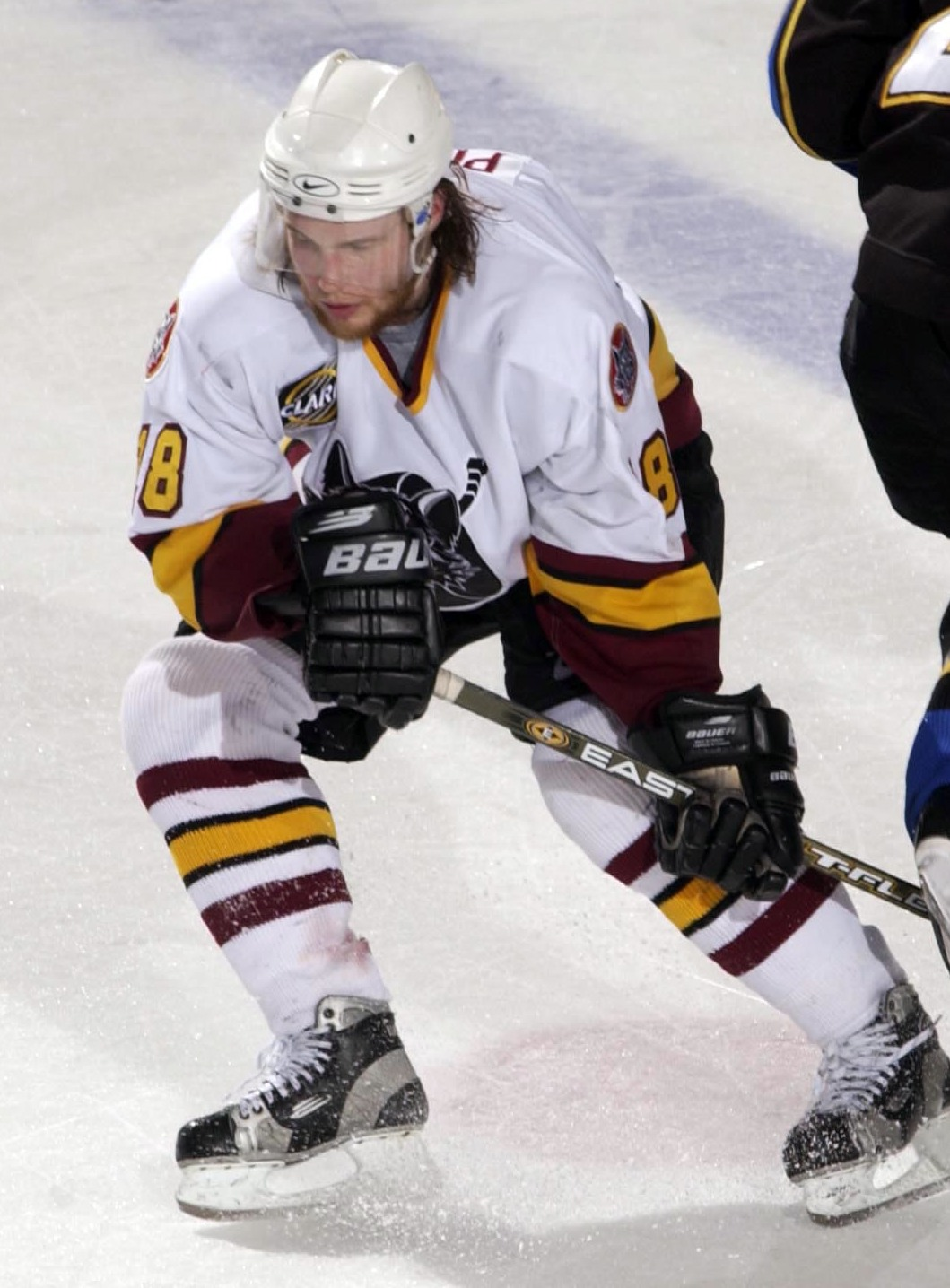
- Piroš with the Chicago Wolves in 2002
- Born: November 20, 1978 (age 47) Most, Czechoslovakia
- Height: 6 ft 1 in (185 cm)
- Weight: 198 lb (90 kg; 14 st 2 lb)
- Position: Centre
- Shot: Left
- Played for: HC Litvínov; HC Vítkovice; Atlanta Thrashers; Florida Panthers; Khimik Voskresensk; Neftekhimik Nizhnekamsk; EV Zug; Kölner Haie; HV71; Ässät; Timrå IK; Avtomobilist Yekaterinburg
- NHL draft: 212th overall, 1997; Buffalo Sabres
- Playing career: 1996–2016

Kamil Piroš (born November 20, 1978) is a Czech former professional ice hockey center/winger, who most notably played with HC Litvínov in the Czech Extraliga as well as the Atlanta Thrashers and the Florida Panthers in the National Hockey League (NHL). He was drafted in the eighth round, 212th overall, by the Buffalo Sabres in the 1997 NHL entry draft.

== Playing career ==
Piroš played six seasons in the Czech Extraliga before coming to North America. During that time, Buffalo Sabres traded his NHL rights (along with a fourth-round draft pick) to the Atlanta Thrashers in exchange for Donald Audette. Piroš joined the Thrashers' American Hockey League affiliate, the Chicago Wolves, in the 2001–02 season, playing in 64 games and scoring 49 points. He also made his NHL debut that season with Atlanta, playing in eight games.

Over the next two seasons, Piroš would appear in 101 more AHL games with the Wolves and 17 more NHL games with the Thrashers. In March 2004, Atlanta traded Piroš to the Florida Panthers in exchange for Kyle Rossiter. After finishing the season with the Panthers' organization (playing three NHL games with Florida and 14 games with their AHL affiliate, the San Antonio Rampage), Piroš left for the Russian Super League. In his NHL career to date, he has appeared in 28 games, recording four goals and adding four assists.

Piroš played two seasons in Russia, one each with Khimik Voskresensk and HC Neftekhimik Nizhnekamsk. In the 2006–07 season, Piroš joined EV Zug in the Swiss Nationalliga A and left for two seasons with Kölner Haie in German Deutsche Eishockey Liga. In late January 2009, he signed with the Swedish Elitserien club HV71 for the remainder of season 2008–09. He left in June 2009 to sign with the Finnish SM-liiga team Ässät Pori, and in late November moved back to Elitserien, this time with Timrå IK.

== Career statistics ==
=== Regular season and playoffs ===
| | | | Regular season | | | | | Playoffs |
| Season | Team | League | GP | G | A | Pts | PIM | GP | G | A | Pts | PIM |
|---|---|---|---|---|---|---|---|---|---|---|---|---|
| 1996–97 | HC Litvinov | ELH | 38 | 4 | 8 | 12 | 10 | — | — | — | — | — |
| 1997–98 | HC Litvinov | ELH | 15 | 0 | 1 | 1 | 2 | — | — | — | — | — |
| 1997–98 | HC Vitkovice | ELH | 25 | 2 | 8 | 10 | 14 | — | — | — | — | — |
| 1998–99 | HC Litvinov | ELH | 42 | 7 | 9 | 16 | 10 | — | — | — | — | — |
| 1999–00 | HC Litvinov | ELH | 40 | 8 | 8 | 16 | 18 | 7 | 0 | 3 | 3 | 2 |
| 2000–01 | HC Litvinov | ELH | 48 | 11 | 13 | 24 | 28 | 6 | 1 | 1 | 2 | 2 |
| 2000–01 | HC Most | Czech.3 | — | — | — | — | — | 2 | 0 | 0 | 0 | 2 |
| 2001–02 | Atlanta Thrashers | NHL | 8 | 0 | 1 | 1 | 4 | — | — | — | — | — |
| 2001–02 | Chicago Wolves | AHL | 64 | 19 | 30 | 49 | 16 | 25 | 6 | 11 | 17 | 6 |
| 2002–03 | Atlanta Thrashers | NHL | 3 | 3 | 2 | 5 | 2 | — | — | — | — | — |
| 2002–03 | Chicago Wolves | AHL | 51 | 10 | 9 | 19 | 16 | 9 | 1 | 0 | 1 | 4 |
| 2003–04 | Atlanta Thrashers | NHL | 14 | 0 | 1 | 1 | 4 | — | — | — | — | — |
| 2003–04 | Chicago Wolves | AHL | 50 | 10 | 20 | 30 | 20 | — | — | — | — | — |
| 2003–04 | Florida Panthers | NHL | 3 | 1 | 0 | 1 | 0 | — | — | — | — | — |
| 2003–04 | San Antonio Rampage | AHL | 14 | 2 | 5 | 7 | 6 | — | — | — | — | — |
| 2004–05 | Khimik Voskresensk | RSL | 27 | 2 | 6 | 8 | 8 | — | — | — | — | — |
| 2005–06 | Neftekhimik Nizhnekamsk | RSL | 33 | 6 | 5 | 11 | 32 | 5 | 1 | 0 | 1 | 2 |
| 2006–07 | EV Zug | NLA | 41 | 9 | 24 | 33 | 22 | — | — | — | — | — |
| 2007–08 | Kölner Haie | DEL | 53 | 12 | 22 | 34 | 34 | 14 | 3 | 6 | 9 | 18 |
| 2008–09 | Kölner Haie | DEL | 40 | 7 | 19 | 26 | 30 | — | — | — | — | — |
| 2008–09 | HV71 | SHL | 8 | 1 | 2 | 3 | 12 | 18 | 2 | 4 | 6 | 8 |
| 2009–10 | Ässät | Liiga | 22 | 2 | 3 | 5 | 16 | — | — | — | — | — |
| 2009–10 | Timrå IK | SHL | 24 | 8 | 5 | 13 | 8 | 5 | 0 | 3 | 3 | 6 |
| 2010–11 | HV71 | SHL | 54 | 12 | 27 | 39 | 34 | 4 | 0 | 0 | 0 | 0 |
| 2011–12 | HV71 | SHL | 47 | 12 | 13 | 25 | 12 | 6 | 1 | 1 | 2 | 0 |
| 2012–13 | Avtomobilist Yekaterinburg | KHL | 18 | 2 | 2 | 4 | 14 | — | — | — | — | — |
| 2012–13 | HC Litvinov | ELH | 18 | 1 | 4 | 5 | 6 | 7 | 1 | 0 | 1 | 0 |
| 2013–14 | HC Litvinov | ELH | 44 | 4 | 3 | 7 | 28 | — | — | — | — | — |
| 2014–15 | HC Litvinov | ELH | 38 | 4 | 6 | 10 | 30 | 16 | 0 | 0 | 0 | 4 |
| 2015–16 | HC Litvinov | ELH | 52 | 4 | 9 | 13 | 28 | — | — | — | — | — |
| ELH totals | | | 360 | 45 | 69 | 114 | 174 | 46 | 5 | 8 | 13 | 12 |
| NHL totals | | | 28 | 4 | 4 | 8 | 10 | — | — | — | — | — |

=== International ===
| Year | Team | Event | Result | GP | G | A | Pts | PIM |
|---|---|---|---|---|---|---|---|---|
| 1996 | Czech Republic | EJC18 | 5th | 4 | 1 | 0 | 1 | 2 |
| 1997 | Czech Republic | WJC | 4th | 7 | 0 | 1 | 1 | 0 |
| 1998 | Czech Republic | WJC | 4th | 7 | 2 | 6 | 8 | 6 |
| Junior totals | | | | 18 | 3 | 7 | 10 | 8 |

== Awards and honours ==
| Award | Year |
|---|---|
AHL
| Calder Cup (Chicago Wolves) | 2002 |
