= Petr Leška =

Czech professional ice hockey player (born 1975)

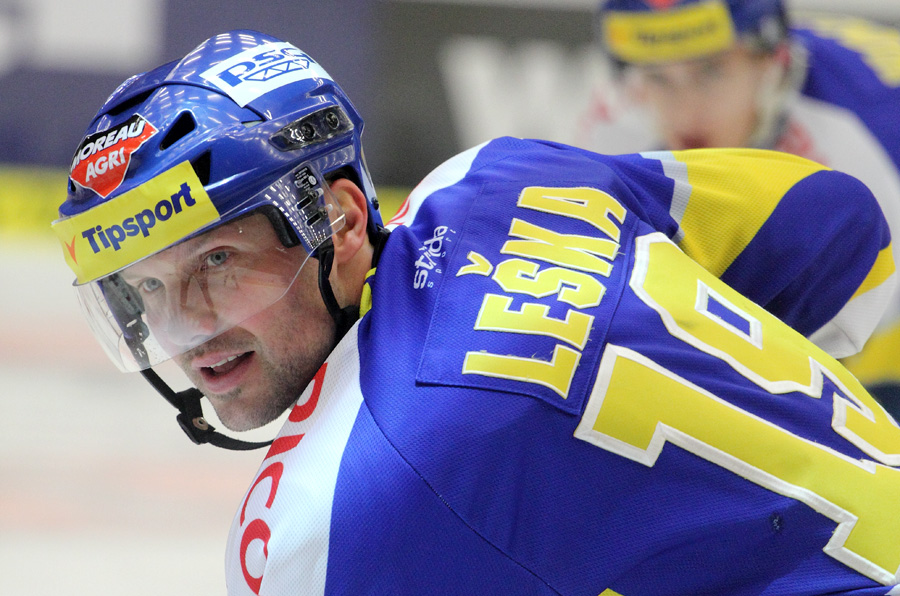
- Born: November 16, 1975 (age 49); Chomutov, Czechoslovakia
- Height: 5 ft 9 in (175 cm)
- Weight: 172 lb (78 kg; 12 st 4 lb)
- Position: Forward
- Shoots: Left
- Czech Extraliga team: HC Zlín
- Playing career: 1994–present

Petr Leška (born November 16, 1975) is a Czech professional ice hockey player. He played with HC Zlín in the Czech Extraliga during the 2010–11 Czech Extraliga season.

== Career statistics ==
			Regular season					Playoffs
Season	Team	League	GP	G	A	Pts	PIM	GP	G	A	Pts	PIM
1992–93	Rögle BK	SWE II Jr	16	11	11	22	46	—	—	—	—	—
1994–95	Flint Generals	CoHL	31	9	17	26	4	—	—	—	—	—
1995–96	AC ZPS Zlín	ELH	36	8	11	19	12	7	1	1	2	0
1996–97	AC ZPS Zlín	ELH	48	8	14	22	18	—	—	—	—	—
1997–98	HC ZPS Barum Zlín	ELH	27	2	6	8	8	—	—	—	—	—
1997–98	HC Keramika Plzeň	ELH	12	3	3	6	2	2	0	1	1	0
1998–99	HC ZPS Barum Zlín	ELH	52	9	15	24	26	11	0	2	2	6
1999–2000	HC Barum Continental Zlín	ELH	52	15	19	34	14	4	0	0	0	0
2000–01	HC Continental Zlín	ELH	52	18	29	47	18	6	2	4	6	4
2001–02	HC Continental Zlín	ELH	52	28	40	68	18	11	4	11	15	6
2002–03	HC Sparta Prag	ELH	52	12	26	38	14	10	3	3	6	0
2003–04	HC Hamé Zlín	ELH	52	14	43	57	48	17	9	9	18	0
2004–05	HC Hamé Zlín	ELH	52	11	38	49	30	4	1	3	4	4
2005–06	Södertälje SK	SEL	6	0	0	0	0	—	—	—	—	—
2005–06	HC Hamé Zlín	ELH	36	4	20	24	18	6	1	3	4	16
2006–07	HC Hamé Zlín	ELH	52	20	21	41	53	5	0	4	4	2
2007–08	RI Okna Zlín	ELH	52	5	27	32	44	—	—	—	—	—
2008–09	PSG Zlín	ELH	52	18	30	48	52	5	2	0	2	2
2009–10	PSG Zlín	ELH	52	14	40	54	32	6	5	7	12	10
2010–11	PSG Zlín	ELH	52	20	32	52	20	4	0	0	0	2
2011–12	PSG Zlín	ELH	52	13	27	40	55	12	2	10	12	8
2012–13	PSG Zlín	ELH	52	8	30	38	30	19	6	6	12	14
2013–14	PSG Zlín	ELH	52	6	38	44	22	17	0	13	13	12
2014–15	PSG Zlín	ELH	52	5	25	30	30	7	0	4	4	4
ELH totals			991	241	534	775	564	153	36	81	117	90
