= 2000–01 Euro Hockey Tour =

Tournament details
- Dates: 31 August 2000 – 11 February 2001
- Teams: 4

Final positions
- Champions: Finland (3rd title)
- Runners-up: Russia
- Third place: Sweden
- Fourth place: Czech Republic

Tournament statistics
- Games played: 24
- Goals scored: 102 (4.25 per game)
- Attendance: 160,305 (6,679 per game)
- Scoring leader: (Czech Republic) Viktor Hübl (6 points)

The 2000–01 Euro Hockey Tour was the fifth season of the Euro Hockey Tour. The season consisted of four tournaments, the Česká Pojišťovna Cup, Karjala Tournament, Baltica Brewery Cup, and the Sweden Hockey Games.

== Standings ==
Pos	Team	Pld	W	OTW	OTL	L	GF	GA	GD	Pts
1	Finland	12	5	3	1	3	36	26	+10	22
2	Russia	12	5	1	2	4	24	27	−3	19
3	Sweden	12	5	1	0	6	23	28	−5	17
4	Czech Republic	12	3	1	3	5	27	29	−2	14

Source: eurohockey

== Česká Pojišťovna Cup ==
The tournament was played between 31 August - 3 September 2000. All of the matches were played in Zlín, Czech Republic. The tournament was won by Finland.

Pos	Team	Pld	W	OTW	OTL	L	GF	GA	GD	Pts
1	Finland	4	1	1	1	1	9	7	+2	6
2	Sweden	3	1	1	0	1	8	8	0	5
3	Russia	3	1	0	2	0	7	8	−1	5
4	Czech Republic	3	0	1	0	2	5	6	−1	2

Source: swehockey

31 August 2000
Russia	3–4 (GWS)	Finland
Czech Republic	2–3	Sweden
1 September 2000
Finland	4–2	Sweden
Russia	2–1	Czech Republic
2 September 2000
Sweden	3–2 (GWS)	Russia
Czech Republic	2–1 (OT)	Finland

== Karjala Tournament ==
The tournament was played between 6–9 September 2000. Five of the matches were played in Helsinki, Finland and one match in Jönköping, Sweden. The tournament was won by Finland.

Pos	Team	Pld	W	OTW	OTL	L	GF	GA	GD	Pts
1	Finland	3	2	1	0	0	12	5	+7	8
2	Sweden	3	2	0	0	1	7	7	0	6
3	Russia	3	1	0	0	2	5	7	−2	3
4	Czech Republic	3	0	0	1	2	3	8	−5	1

Source: hokej

9 November 2000
Sweden	4–1	Czech Republic
Finland	4–3	Russia
11 November 2000
Russia	0–2	Sweden
Czech Republic	1–2 (OT)	Finland
12 November 2000
Czech Republic	1–2	Russia
Finland	6–1	Sweden

== Baltica Brewery Cup ==
The tournament was played between 17–20 December 2000. All of the matches were played in Moscow, Russia. The tournament was won by Russia.

Pos	Team	Pld	W	OTW	SOW	OTL	SOL	L	GF	GA	GD	Pts
1	Russia	3	2	0	1	0	0	0	8	5	+3	8
2	Czech Republic	3	2	0	0	0	1	0	14	9	+5	7
3	Finland	3	1	0	0	0	0	2	7	9	−2	3
4	Sweden	3	0	0	0	0	0	3	3	9	−6	0

Source: swehockey

17 December 2000
Finland	1–2	Russia
Sweden	2–4	Czech Republic
18 December 2000
Sweden	1–4	Finland
Russia	5–4 (GWS)	Czech Republic
20 December 2000
Czech Republic	6–2	Finland
Russia	1–0	Sweden

== Sweden Hockey Games ==
The tournament was played between 6–9 February 2001. Five of the matches were played in Stockholm, Sweden and one match in Pardubice, Czech Republic. The tournament was won by Sweden.

Pos	Team	Pld	W	OTW	OTL	L	GF	GA	GD	Pts
1	Sweden	4	3	0	0	1	10	5	+5	9
2	Finland	4	2	1	0	1	14	8	+6	8
3	Canada	4	2	0	0	2	13	16	−3	6
4	Czech Republic	4	1	0	1	2	6	9	−3	4
5	Russia	4	1	0	0	3	8	13	−5	3

Source: swehockey

6 February 2001
Russia	2–1	Czech Republic
Canada	1–5	Sweden
7 February 2001
Finland	3–2 (OT)	Czech Republic
8 February 2001
Finland	6–3	Canada
Sweden	2–1	Russia
9 February 2001
Czech Republic	1–3	Canada
10 February 2001
Russia	1–4	Finland
Czech Republic	2–1	Sweden
11 February 2001
Canada	6–4	Russia
Sweden	2–1	Finland
