= Vojtěch Kubinčák =

Czech ice hockey player

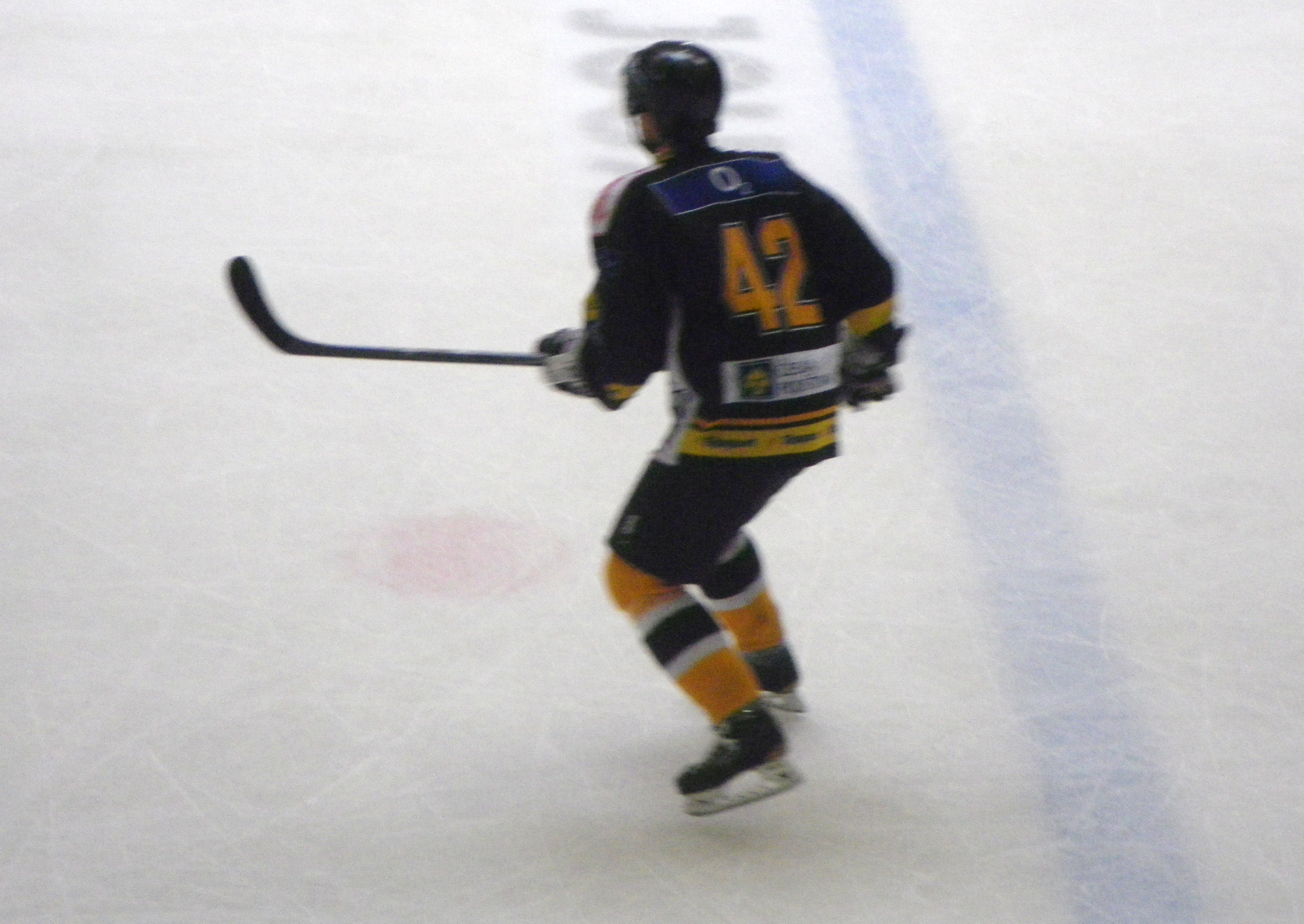
- Born: February 4, 1979 (age 46)
- Height: 5 ft 10 in (178 cm)
- Weight: 176 lb (80 kg; 12 st 8 lb)
- Position: Forward
- Shoots: Left
- ELH team Former teams: KLH Chomutov; HC Liberec; HC Sparta Praha; HC Litvinov
- Playing career: 1998–present

Vojtěch Kubinčák (born February 4, 1979) is a Czech professional ice hockey player currently playing for KLH Chomutov in the Czech Extraliga.

== Career ==
Kubinčák has played with HC Litvínov in the Czech Extraliga between seasons 1997–98 and 2001–02, and again since the season 2003–04. In the 2002–03 Czech Extraliga season he played with HC Liberec and HC Sparta Praha.

After the 2010–11 Czech Extraliga season Kubincak had played a total of 622 Czech Extraliga regular season games during 14 seasons and scored a total of 282 regular season points, 131 goals, and 151 assists.

Kubinčák has represented Czech Republic men's national ice hockey team in three Euro Hockey Tour games during the season 2006–2007.
