= 2014–15 Czech Extraliga season =

2014–15 Czech Extraliga
- League: Czech Extraliga
- Sport: Ice hockey
- Duration: September 2014 – March 2015
- Teams: 14
- TV partner: Czech Television

Regular season
- Presidential Cup: HC Oceláři Třinec
- Top scorer: Viktor Hübl (HC Verva Litvínov)

Playoffs

Finals
- Champions: HC Verva Litvínov
- Runners-up: HC Oceláři Třinec

Czech Extraliga seasons
- ← 2013–14 2015–16 →

The 2014–15 Czech Extraliga season is the 22nd season of the Czech Extraliga since its creation after the breakup of Czechoslovakia and the Czechoslovak First Ice Hockey League in 1993. HC Verva Litvínov won their first championship after defeating HC Oceláři Třinec in seven games in the finals.

== Regular season ==
As of 1 March 2015.

Pl.	Team	GP	W	OTW	OTL	L	Goals	Pts
1.	HC Oceláři Třinec	52	32	4	3	13	183:117	107
2.	HC Verva Litvínov	52	30	6	3	13	167:120	105
3.	HC Kometa Brno	52	28	3	5	16	153:135	95
4.	HC Sparta Praha	52	27	6	1	18	194:140	94
5.	Mountfield HK	52	26	3	1	22	136:131	85
6.	PSG Zlín	52	22	5	5	20	145:153	81
7.	HC Škoda Plzeň	52	19	8	2	23	144:133	75
8.	HC Vítkovice Steel	52	21	4	4	23	136:153	75
9.	HC ČSOB Pojišťovna Pardubice	52	22	1	6	23	143:156	74
10.	BK Mladá Boleslav	52	21	0	9	22	156:164	72
11.	HC Bílí Tygři Liberec	52	16	9	3	24	128:131	69
12.	HC Energie Karlovy Vary	52	16	2	10	24	110:146	62
13.	HC Olomouc	52	13	5	5	29	126:167	54
14.	HC Slavia Praha	52	12	3	2	35	106:181	44

=== Scoring leaders ===
List shows the ten best skaters based on the number of points during the regular season. If two or more skaters are tied (i.e. same number of points, goals and played games), all of the tied skaters are shown.
GP = Games played; G = Goals; A = Assists; Pts = Points; +/– = Plus/minus; PIM = Penalty minutes

Player	Team	GP	G	A	Pts	+/–	PIM
(Czech Republic) Viktor Hübl	HC Verva Litvínov	51	21	37	58	+16	30
(Czech Republic) Martin Ručinský	HC Verva Litvínov	51	19	35	54	+17	64
(Czech Republic) Tomáš Mertl	Mountfield HK	50	24	26	50	+11	58
(Czech Republic) Jaroslav Hlinka	HC Sparta Praha	48	17	33	50	+3	32
(Czech Republic) Erik Hrňa	HC Oceláři Třinec	45	26	21	47	+10	12
(Czech Republic) Petr Sýkora	HC ČSOB Pojišťovna Pardubice	48	26	18	44	+13	50
(Czech Republic) Jiří Polanský	HC Oceláři Třinec	46	18	25	43	+16	60
(Czech Republic) Jaroslav Bednář	HC Slavia Praha	47	17	26	43	-14	20
(Czech Republic) Petr Ton	HC Kometa Brno	51	22	20	42	+10	16
(Czech Republic) Vladimír Svačina	HC Vítkovice Steel	52	17	25	42	+7	18

=== Leading goaltenders ===
These are the leaders in GAA among goaltenders who played at least 40% of the team's minutes. The table is sorted by GAA, and the criteria for inclusion are bolded.

GP = Games played; TOI = Time on ice (minutes); GA = Goals against; SO = Shutouts; Sv% = Save percentage; GAA = Goals against average

Player	Team	GP	TOI	GA	SO	Sv%	GAA
(Czech Republic) Šimon Hrubec	HC Oceláři Třinec	37	2133	71	6	.924	2.00
(Czech Republic) Ondřej Kacetl	Mountfield HK	23	1275	43	1	.918	2.02
(Czech Republic) Pavel Francouz	HC Verva Litvínov	46	2711	94	7	.932	2.08
(Slovakia) Marek Čiliak	HC Kometa Brno	45	2598	95	5	.918	2.19
(Czech Republic) Filip Novotný	HC Sparta Praha	36	2034	76	1	.912	2.24
(Slovakia) Ján Lašák	HC Bílí Tygři Liberec	46	2735	106	2	.921	2.33
(Czech Republic) Matěj Machovský	HC Škoda Plzeň	48	2678	108	2	.917	2.42
(Czech Republic) Daniel Dolejš	HC Vítkovice Steel	39	2184	91	1	.911	2.50
(Czech Republic) Pavel Kantor	Mountfield HK	31	1790	78	1	.901	2.61
(Czech Republic) Tomáš Závorka	HC Energie Karlovy Vary	40	2282	100	1	.925	2.63

== Playoffs ==
=== Play-in Round ===
- HC Vítkovice Steel - HC ČSOB Pojišťovna Pardubice 1:3 (8:2, 2:4, 6:3, 5:0)
- HC Škoda Plzeň - BK Mladá Boleslav 1:3 (4:5, 2:1, 4:2, 4:2)

Quarterfinals
1	HC Oceláři Třinec	4
10	BK Mladá Boleslav	1
5	Mountfield HK	0
4	HC Sparta Praha	4
3	HC Kometa Brno	4
6	PSG Zlín	1
9	HC ČSOB Pojišťovna Pardubice	1
2	HC Verva Litvínov	4

Semifinals
1	HC Oceláři Třinec	4
4	HC Sparta Praha	2
2	HC Litvínov	4
3	HC Kometa Brno	1

Final
1	HC Oceláři Třinec	3
2	HC Litvínov	4

Play-off final: HC Oceláři Třinec - HC Verva Litvínov 3:4 (1:3, 2:3, 0:1, 3:0, 2:1 P, 6:3, 0:2). HC Litvínov won its first ever league title.

== Relegation ==
Place	Team	GP	W	OTW	OTL	L	GF	GA	Pts
1	HC Energie Karlovy Vary	58	21	2	11	24	131	160	78
2	HC Bílí Tygři Liberec	58	18	9	3	28	142	148	75
3	HC Olomouc	58	15	6	5	32	143	185	62
4	HC Slavia Praha	58	14	3	2	39	118	196	50
