= 2002 IIHF World Championship =

2002 edition of the IIHF World Championship

Tournament details
- Host country: Sweden
- Venues: 3 (in 3 host cities)
- Dates: 26 April – 11 May
- Opened by: Carl XVI Gustaf
- Teams: 16

Final positions
- Champions: Slovakia (1st title)
- Runners-up: Russia
- Third place: Sweden
- Fourth place: Finland

Tournament statistics
- Games played: 56
- Goals scored: 340 (6.07 per game)
- Attendance: 305,541 (5,456 per game)
- Scoring leader: (Slovakia) Miroslav Šatan (13 points)

The 2002 IIHF World Championship was held between 26 April and 11 May 2002 in Gothenburg, Karlstad and Jönköping, Sweden.

It was the 66th annual event, and was run by the International Ice Hockey Federation (IIHF).

== Qualification tournament ==
Far Eastern qualification for the tournament took place between October 15 and October 17, 2001, in Harbin, China.

Team	Pld	W	D	L	GF	GA	GD	Pts
Japan	2	1	1	0	4	2	+2	3
South Korea	2	0	2	0	1	1	0	2
China	2	0	1	1	1	3	−2	1

Source: IIHF

All times local

October 15, 2001; 19:00	South Korea	1–1	Japan

October 16, 2001; 19:00	Japan	3–1	China

October 17, 2001; 19:00	China	0–0	South Korea

== Venues ==
2002 IIHF World Championship is located in Southern half of Sweden	Scandinavium Capacity: 12,044	Kinnarps Arena Capacity: 6,236	Löfbergs Lila Arena Capacity: 8,647
2002 IIHF World Championship is located in Southern half of Sweden	Gothenburg	Jönköping	Karlstad

== Final tournament ==
In the first round, the top three teams from each group progressed to the second round, whilst the last-placed team progressed to the consolation round.

=== First round ===
==== Group A ====
Team	Pld	W	D	L	GF	GA	GD	Pts
Czech Republic	3	3	0	0	17	8	+9	6
Germany	3	2	0	1	17	9	+8	4
Switzerland	3	1	0	2	5	9	−4	2
Japan	3	0	0	3	6	19	−13	0

Source: IIHF

26 April 2002; 15:15	Germany	9–2	Japan

26 April 2002; 20:03	Switzerland	0–5	Czech Republic

28 April 2002; 15:15	Germany	3–0	Switzerland

28 April 2002; 19:00	Czech Republic	5–3	Japan

29 April 2002; 16:00	Japan	1–5	Switzerland

29 April 2002; 15:15	Czech Republic	7–5	Germany

==== Group B ====
Team	Pld	W	D	L	GF	GA	GD	Pts
Finland	3	3	0	0	14	1	+13	6
Slovakia	3	2	0	1	13	7	+6	4
Ukraine	3	1	0	2	7	8	−1	2
Poland	3	0	0	3	0	18	−18	0

Source: IIHF

27 April 2002; 15:15	Slovakia	7–0	Poland

27 April 2002; 19:00	Ukraine	0–3	Finland

29 April 2002; 16:00	Slovakia	5–4	Ukraine

29 April 2002; 20:00	Finland	8–0	Poland

30 April 2002; 16:00	Finland	3–1	Slovakia

30 April 2002; 20:00	Poland	0–3	Ukraine

==== Group C ====
Team	Pld	W	D	L	GF	GA	GD	Pts
Sweden	3	3	0	0	15	5	+10	6
Russia	3	2	0	1	14	6	+8	4
Austria	3	1	0	2	11	14	−3	2
Slovenia	3	0	0	3	6	21	−15	0

Source: IIHF

26 April 2002; 16:00	Russia	8–1	Slovenia

26 April 2002; 20:15	Austria	3–5	Sweden

28 April 2002; 15:15	Russia	6–3	Austria

28 April 2002; 19:00	Sweden	8–2	Slovenia

30 April 2002; 16:00	Slovenia	3–5	Austria

30 April 2002; 20:00	Sweden	2–0	Russia

==== Group D ====
Team	Pld	W	D	L	GF	GA	GD	Pts
Canada	3	3	0	0	11	2	+9	6
United States	3	2	0	1	9	6	+3	4
Latvia	3	1	0	2	7	8	−1	2
Italy	3	0	0	3	3	14	−11	0

Source: IIHF

27 April 2002; 15:15	Italy	2–5	United States

27 April 2002; 19:05	Canada	4–1	Latvia

29 April 2002; 16:00	Canada	5–0	Italy

29 April 2002; 20:00	United States	3–2	Latvia

30 April 2002; 16:00	Latvia	4–1	Italy

30 April 2002; 20:00	United States	1–2	Canada

=== Second round ===
In the second round, the top three teams from each group progressed to the final round, whilst the bottom two teams were eliminated.

==== Group E ====
Tables and scores below include meetings between teams during the first round.

Team	Pld	W	D	L	GF	GA	GD	Pts
Czech Republic	5	5	0	0	25	11	+14	10
Canada	5	4	0	1	13	10	+3	8
United States	5	2	1	2	13	11	+2	5
Germany	5	2	1	2	14	14	0	5
Switzerland	5	1	0	4	8	18	−10	2
Latvia	5	0	0	5	10	19	−9	0

Source: IIHF

26 April 2002; 20:03	Switzerland	0–5	Czech Republic

27 April 2002; 19:05	Canada	4–1	Latvia

28 April 2002; 15:15	Germany	3–0	Switzerland

29 April 2002; 20:00	United States	3–2	Latvia

29 April 2002; 15:15	Czech Republic	7–5	Germany

30 April 2002; 20:00	United States	1–2	Canada

2 May 2002; 16:00	United States	3–0	Switzerland

2 May 2002; 20:00	Canada	3–1	Germany

2 May 2002; 20:00	Czech Republic	3–1	Latvia

3 May 2002; 16:00	Switzerland	2–3	Canada

3 May 2002; 20:00	Germany	3–2	Latvia

4 May 2002; 15:15	Czech Republic	5–4	United States

5 May 2002; 15:15	United States	2–2	Germany

5 May 2002; 19:00	Canada	1–5	Czech Republic

5 May 2002; 19:00	Latvia	4–6	Switzerland

==== Group F ====
Tables and scores below include meetings between teams during the first round.

Team	Pld	W	D	L	GF	GA	GD	Pts
Sweden	5	4	0	1	19	7	+12	8
Finland	5	4	0	1	12	6	+6	8
Slovakia	5	4	0	1	20	15	+5	8
Russia	5	1	1	3	13	15	−2	3
Ukraine	5	1	1	3	10	20	−10	3
Austria	5	0	0	5	12	23	−11	0

Source: IIHF

26 April 2002; 20:15	Austria	3–5	Sweden

27 April 2002; 19:00	Ukraine	0–3	Finland

28 April 2002; 15:15	Russia	6–3	Austria

29 April 2002; 16:00	Slovakia	5–4	Ukraine

30 April 2002; 16:00	Finland	3–1	Slovakia

30 April 2002; 20:00	Sweden	2–0	Russia

2 May 2002; 16:00	Finland	3–1	Austria

2 May 2002; 20:00	Sweden	1–2	Slovakia

3 May 2002; 16:00	Russia	3–3	Ukraine

3 May 2002; 20:00	Slovakia	6–3	Austria

4 May 2002; 15:15	Ukraine	0–7	Sweden

4 May 2002; 19:00	Finland	1–0	Russia

5 May 2002; 19:00	Sweden	4–2	Finland

6 May 2002; 16:00	Austria	2–3	Ukraine

6 May 2002; 20:00	Russia	4–6	Slovakia

=== Consolation round 13–16 place ===
==== Group G ====
Team	Pld	W	D	L	GF	GA	GD	Pts
Slovenia	3	3	0	0	12	5	+7	6
Poland	3	2	0	1	12	7	+5	4
Italy	3	1	0	2	7	11	−4	2
Japan	3	0	0	3	7	15	−8	0

Source: IIHF

As the Far Eastern qualifier, Japan avoided relegation. Therefore, Poland and Italy were relegated to Division I for the 2003 Championships.

2 May 2002; 12:00	Slovenia	4–3	Japan

2 May 2002; 16:00	Poland	5–1	Italy

3 May 2002; 16:00	Poland	2–4	Slovenia

3 May 2002; 20:00	Japan	2–6	Italy

5 May 2002; 11:00	Italy	0–4	Slovenia

5 May 2002; 15:15	Japan	2–5	Poland

=== Final round ===
Quarter-finals
7 May
Finland	3
United States	1
7 May
Czech Republic	1
Russia	3
7 May
Sweden	6
Germany	2
7 May
Canada	2
Slovakia	3

Semi-finals
9 May
Finland	2
Russia	3
9 May
Sweden	2
Slovakia	3

Final
11 May
Russia	3
Slovakia	4
Third place
10 May
Finland	3
Sweden	5

==== Quarterfinals ====
7 May	Finland	3–1	United States

7 May	Sweden	6–2	Germany

7 May	Czech Republic	1–3	Russia

7 May	Canada	2–3 (1–0, 1–1, 0–2)	Slovakia

Dany Heatley 12:45; Ryan Smyth 23:59 / Goals / 39:59 Peter Bondra; 43:47 Miroslav Šatan; 44:37 Peter Bondra

==== Semifinals ====
9 May	Russia	3–2 (1–1, 1–1, 0–0 – 0–0, 1–0)	Finland

	0–1	04:37 – Jere Karalahti
Dmitry Zatonsky – 10:19	1–1
	1–2	20:48 – Niklas Hagman
Maxim Afinogenov – 29:40	2–2

9 May	Sweden	2–3 (1–0, 1–1, 0–1 – 0–0, 0–1)	Slovakia

Per-Johan Axelsson 17:02	1–0
Thomas Johansson 31:44	2–0
	2–1	35:32 Vladimír Országh
	2–2	58:02 Miroslav Šatan

==== Match for third place ====
10 May; 19:00	Finland	3–5 (2–0, 1–3, 0–2)	Sweden	Gothenburg; Attendance: 9,817

Tomi Kallio − 04:39	1–0
Niklas Hagman − 08:56	2–0
Kimmo Rintanen − 21:33	3–0
	3–1	23:22 − Johan Davidsson
	3–2	34:21 − Mattias Weinhandl
	3–3	38:44 − Thomas Rhodin
	3–4	53:54 − Thomas Rhodin
	3–5	59:53 − Nichlas Falk

==== Final ====
11 May; 19:00	Russia	3–4 (0–2, 1–1, 2–1)	Slovakia	Scandinavium; Attendance: 11,591

Game reference

Sokolov
Goalies
Lašák
Referees:
Pakaslahti
Carpentier, Redding

	0–1	0:22 Višňovský (Stümpel)
	0–2	12:10 Bondra (Šatan, Pálffy)
23:27 Sushinsky (Zatonsky, Prokopiev)	1–2
	1–3	26:59 Šatan (Handzuš)
42:09 Antipov (Karpov)	2–3
54:15 Sushinsky (Prokopiev)	3–3
	3–4	58:20 Bondra (Pálffy)

10 min
Penalties
8 min
21
Shots
21

== Ranking and statistics ==
2002 IIHF World Championship winners

Slovakia
1st title

=== Tournament awards ===
- Best players selected by the directorate:
  - Best Goaltender: (Russia) Maxim Sokolov
  - Best Defenceman: (Sweden) Daniel Tjärnqvist
  - Best Forward: (Finland) Niklas Hagman
  - Most Valuable Player: (Slovakia) Miroslav Šatan
- Media All-Star Team:
  - Goaltender: (Russia) Maxim Sokolov
  - Defence: (Slovakia) Richard Lintner, (Sweden) Thomas Rhodin
  - Forwards: (Slovakia) Peter Bondra, (Finland) Niklas Hagman, (Slovakia) Miroslav Šatan

=== Final standings ===
The final standings of the tournament according to IIHF:

1st place, gold medalist(s)	Slovakia
2nd place, silver medalist(s)	Russia
3rd place, bronze medalist(s)	Sweden
4	Finland
5	Czech Republic
6	Canada
7	United States
8	Germany
9	Ukraine
10	Switzerland
11	Latvia
12	Austria
13	Slovenia
14	Poland
15	Italy
16	Japan

=== Scoring leaders ===
List shows the top ten skaters sorted by points, then goals, then (fewer) games played.

Player	GP	G	A	Pts	+/−	PIM	POS
(Slovakia) Miroslav Šatan	9	5	8	13	+2	2	F
(Sweden) Kristian Huselius	9	5	6	11	+7	0	F
(Slovakia) Peter Bondra	9	7	2	9	+12	20	F
(Czech Republic) Jaromír Jágr	7	4	4	8	+5	2	F
(Slovakia) Richard Lintner	9	4	4	8	+1	22	D
(Finland) Timo Pärssinen	9	3	5	8	+3	4	F
(Germany) Jan Benda	7	1	7	8	+4	14	D
(Slovenia) Marcel Rodman	6	6	1	7	–1	2	F
(Sweden) Ulf Dahlén	9	5	2	7	+5	0	F
(Finland) Niklas Hagman	9	5	2	7	+2	2	F

Source: IIHF.com

=== Leading goaltenders ===
Only the top five goaltenders, based on save percentage, who have played 40% of their team's minutes are included in this list.

Player	MIP	SOG	GA	GAA	SVS%	SO
(United States) Ryan Miller	238:13	139	7	1.76	94.96	1
(Finland) Jussi Markkanen	429:42	159	10	1.40	93.71	2
(Russia) Maxim Sokolov	291:05	167	11	2.27	93.41	0
(Ukraine) Kostyantyn Simchuk	268:25	134	9	2.02	93.28	1
(Sweden) Tommy Salo	429:00	178	14	1.96	92.13	1

Source: IIHF.com

== IIHF honors and awards ==
The 2002 IIHF Hall of Fame induction ceremony has held in Gothenburg during the World Championships. Pat Marsh of Great Britain was given the Paul Loicq Award for outstanding contributions to international ice hockey.

IIHF Hall of Fame inductees

- Ernest Aljančič, Slovenia
- Ivan Hlinka, Czech Republic
- Matti Keinonen, Finland
- Nils Nilsson, Sweden
- Peter Patton, Great Britain
- Gord Renwick, Canada
- William Thayer Tutt, United States
- Vladimir Yurzinov, Russia

== See also ==
- IIHF World Championship
