= Alexander Savchenkov =

Russian ice hockey player

- Born: 30 September 1973 (age 52) Moscow, Soviet Union
- Height: 5 ft 9 in (175 cm)
- Weight: 187 lb (85 kg; 13 st 5 lb)
- Position: Right wing
- Shot: Right
- Played for: Krylya Sovetov Moscow; Dynamo Moscow; Metallurg Magnitogorsk; Vityaz Podolsk
- National team: Russia
- Playing career: 1991–2008

Alexander Savchenkov (Russian: Александр Савченков; born 30 September 1973) is a Russian former professional ice hockey forward who last played for Krylya Sovetov team in Russia. He scored 123 goals in 453 games in Russian championship.

In 2002–2003 season Savchenkov scored 12 goals in eight games against Moscow's teams in Russian championship.

== Honours ==
- Russian championship: 2000, 2005, 2007

== International statistics ==
Year	Team	Event	Place	GP	G	A	Pts	PIM
2002	Russia	WC	2nd place, silver medalist(s)	2	0	0	0	2
