= Jaroslav Hübl (ice hockey, born 1982) =

Czech ice hockey player

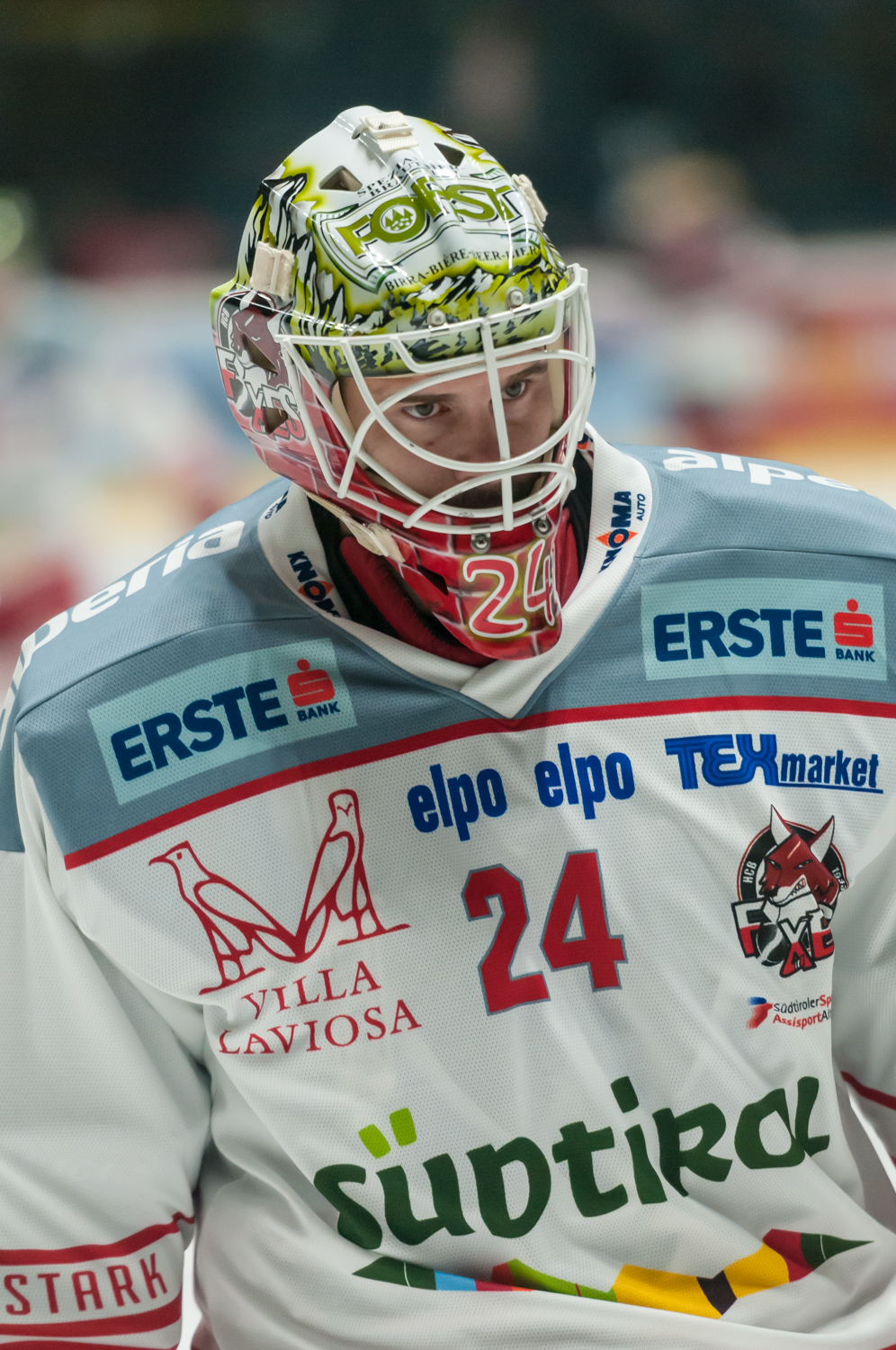
- Born: 29 December 1982 (age 43) Ústí nad Labem, Czechoslovakia
- Height: 6 ft 0 in (183 cm)
- Weight: 165 lb (75 kg; 11 st 11 lb)
- Position: Goaltender
- Catches: Left
- team Former teams: Free Agent; HC Litvínov; HC Davos; BK Mladá Boleslav; SCL Tigers; Ilves; HC Bolzano
- Playing career: 2002–present

Jaroslav Hübl (born 29 December 1982) is a Czech professional ice hockey goaltender currently an unrestricted free agent who most recently played with Italian club, HCB South Tyrol of the Austrian Hockey League (EBEL). He previously played with Ilves in the Finnish SM-liiga before joining Bolzano. He originally played professionally with HC Litvínov of the Czech Extraliga. On August 18, 2014, Hübl opted to remain with defending EBEL champions, HC Bolzano, signing a one-year contract.

His father Jaroslav and cousin Viktor were also professionals in the sport.
