= Evgeny Tertyshny =

Russian politician (1935–2025)

- Евгений Тертышный

Member of the Congress of People's Deputies of the Soviet Union
- In office 25 May 1989 – 5 September 1991

Personal details
- Born: Evgeny Alekseyevich Tertyshny; 22 February 1935 Shadrinsk, Chelyabinsk Oblast, Russian SFSR, USSR
- Died: 28 March 2025 (aged 90) Cheboksary, Chuvashia, Russia
- Party: CPSU
- Education: Saratov Polytechnic Institute
- Occupation: Politician, engineer

Evgeny Alekseyevich Tertyshny (Russian: Евгений Алексеевич Тертышный; 22 February 1935 – 28 March 2025) was a Russian politician and engineer, who was a member of the Communist Party of the Soviet Union. He served in the Congress of People's Deputies from 1989 to 1991.

Tertyshny died in Cheboksary on 28 March 2025, at the age of 90.
