= Arto Tukio =

Finnish ice hockey player

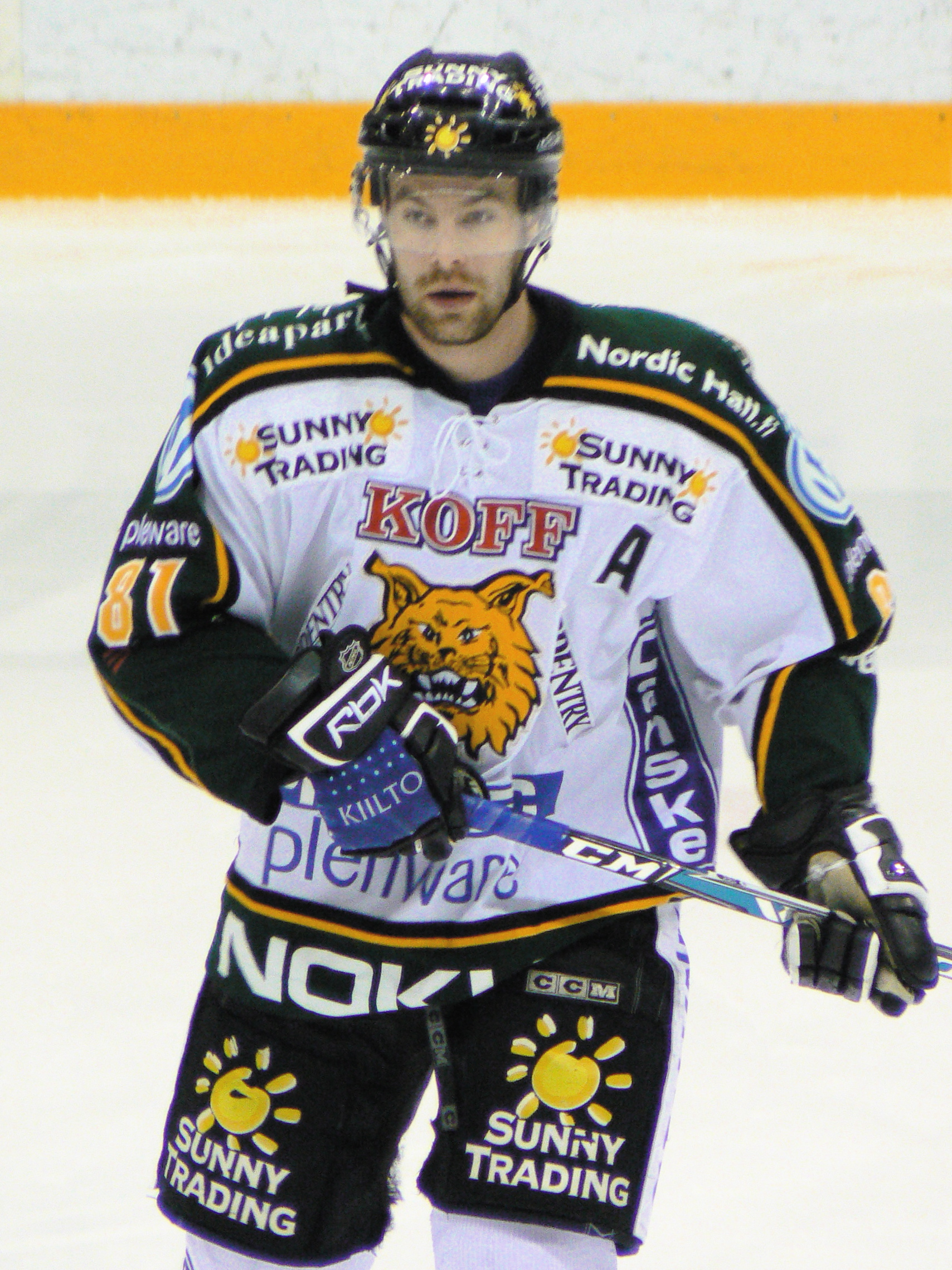
- Born: April 4, 1981 (age 45) Tampere, Finland
- Height: 5 ft 10 in (178 cm)
- Weight: 176 lb (80 kg; 12 st 8 lb)
- Position: Defence
- Shot: Left
- SM-liiga team Former teams: Ilves; Jokerit
- NHL draft: 101st overall, 2000; New York Islanders
- Playing career: 1999–2013

Arto Tukio
Medal record

Representing Finland

Men's ice hockey

World U18 Championships
Gold medal – first place	1999 Füssen	

Arto Tukio (born April 4, 1981) is a Finnish former professional ice hockey defenceman.

== Playing career ==
Tukio began his career with Ilves his hometown team. He was drafted 101st overall by the New York Islanders in the 2000 NHL entry draft but never made it to the North American leagues and remained in Scandinavia. After three seasons with Ilves, Tukio moved to Jokerit. In 2004, he moved to the Swedish Elitserien with Frölunda HC where he won the Swedish Championship. After two more years with Frölunda, Tukio returned to Ilves in 2007.

== Career statistics ==
=== Regular season and playoffs ===
			Regular season					Playoffs
Season	Team	League	GP	G	A	Pts	PIM	GP	G	A	Pts	PIM
1996–97	Ilves	FIN U18	20	0	2	2	6	1	1	0	1	0
1997–98	Ilves	FIN U18	21	4	6	10	38	—	—	—	—	—
1998–99	Ilves	FIN U18	10	1	5	6	18	—	—	—	—	—
1998–99	Ilves	FIN U20	18	1	4	5	12	10	0	0	0	2
1999–2000	Ilves	FIN U20	13	3	2	5	24	—	—	—	—	—
1999–2000	Ilves	SM-liiga	42	2	1	3	20	3	0	0	0	0
1999–2000	Hermes	FIN.2	3	0	0	0	2	—	—	—	—	—
2000–01	Ilves	FIN U20	3	1	1	2	0	—	—	—	—	—
2000–01	Ilves	SM-liiga	43	5	10	15	26	7	2	1	3	4
2001–02	Ilves	SM-liiga	47	8	9	17	28	3	0	1	1	0
2002–03	Jokerit	SM-liiga	49	6	10	16	26	9	0	1	1	4
2003–04	Jokerit	SM-liiga	54	4	12	16	10	—	—	—	—	—
2004–05	Frölunda HC	SEL	48	1	7	8	20	13	0	2	2	20
2005–06	Frölunda HC	SEL	38	4	6	10	71	17	1	3	4	22
2006–07	Frölunda HC	SEL	50	2	8	10	36	—	—	—	—	—
2007–08	Ilves	SM-liiga	52	6	22	28	64	9	0	3	3	10
2008–09	Ilves	SM-liiga	51	6	12	18	26	2	0	0	0	0
2009–10	Ilves	SM-liiga	32	0	5	5	38	—	—	—	—	—
2010–11	Ilves	SM-liiga	32	4	5	9	51	4	0	0	0	4
2010–11	LeKi	Mestis	1	0	0	0	0	—	—	—	—	—
2011–12	Ilves	SM-liiga	44	1	6	7	26	—	—	—	—	—
2012–13	Ilves	SM-liiga	51	1	5	6	32	—	—	—	—	—
SM-liiga totals			497	43	97	140	347	37	2	6	8	20
SEL totals			136	7	21	28	127	30	1	5	6	42

=== International ===
Year	Team	Event	GP	G	A	Pts	PIM
1999	Finland	WJC18	7	0	2	2	0
2000	Finland	WJC	7	3	3	6	6
Junior totals			14	3	5	8	6
