= Jaroslav Hübl (ice hockey, born 1957) =

Czech ice hockey player

- Born: October 4, 1957 (age 68) Czechoslovakia
- Position: Forward
- Played for: Czechoslovakia; HC Litvínov; HK Dukla Trenčín
- NHL draft: Undrafted
- Playing career: 1977–1993

Jaroslav Hübl (born October 4, 1957) is a Czech former professional ice hockey player.

== Career ==
Between 1977 and 1993, Hübl played 12 seasons in the Czechoslovak First Ice Hockey League, mostly with HC Litvínov. In 407 league games, he scored 120 goals and 126 assists for 246 points while registering 305 minutes in penalties.

== Personal life ==
Hübl's son Jaroslav (a goaltender) and nephew Viktor were also professionals in the sport.
