= Tomáš Závorka =

Czech ice hockey player

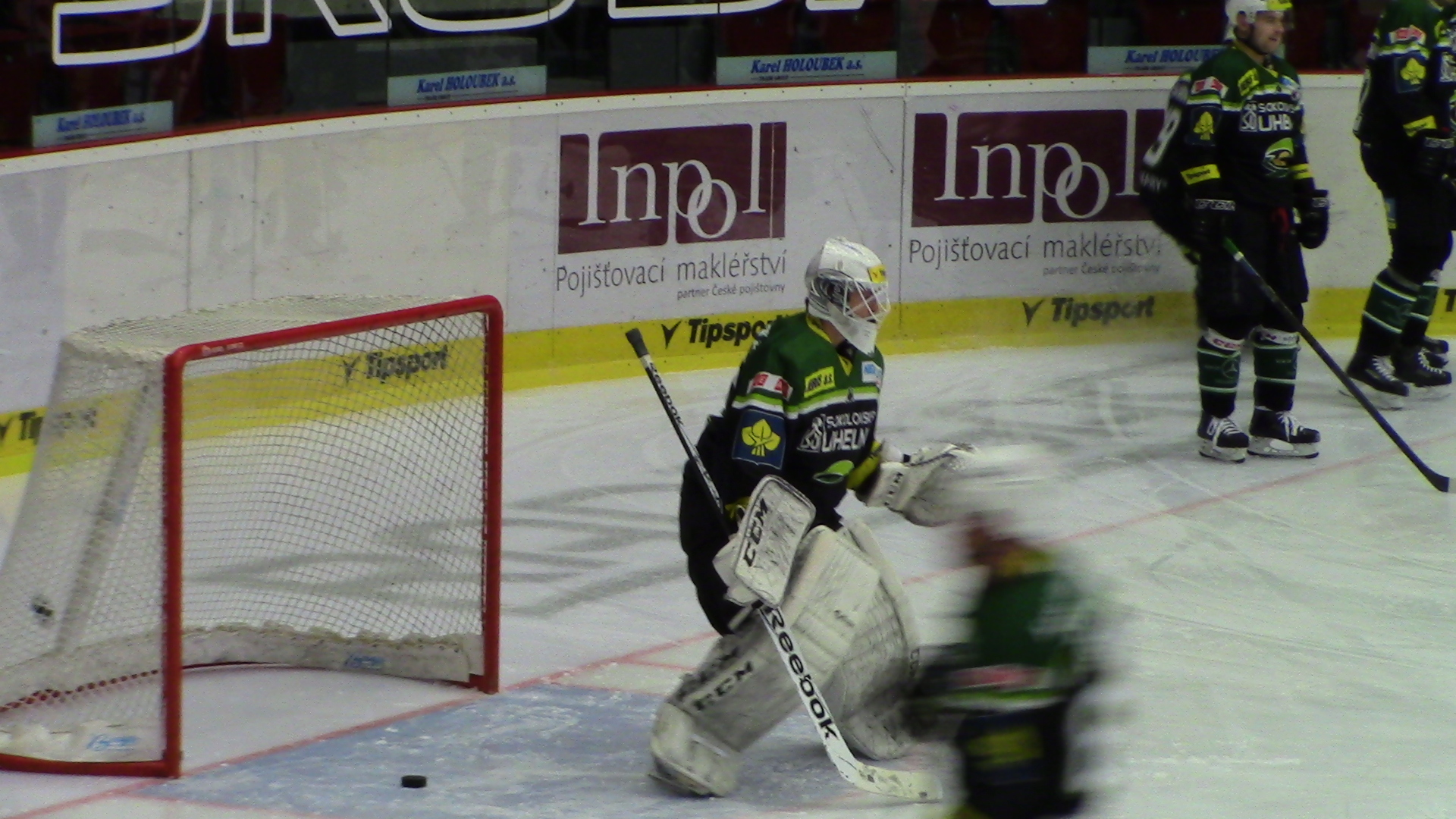
- Tomáš Závorka
- Born: November 26, 1987 (age 38) Sokolov, Czechoslovakia
- Height: 6 ft 0 in (183 cm)
- Weight: 174 lb (79 kg; 12 st 6 lb)
- Position: Goaltender
- Caught: Right
- Played for: HC Karlovy Vary
- Playing career: 2007–2019

Tomáš Závorka (born November 26, 1987) is a Czech former professional ice hockey goaltender.

Závorka played 227 games for HC Karlovy Vary in the Czech Extraliga from 2010 until his retirement in 2019.
