= Martti Järventie =

Finnish ice hockey player

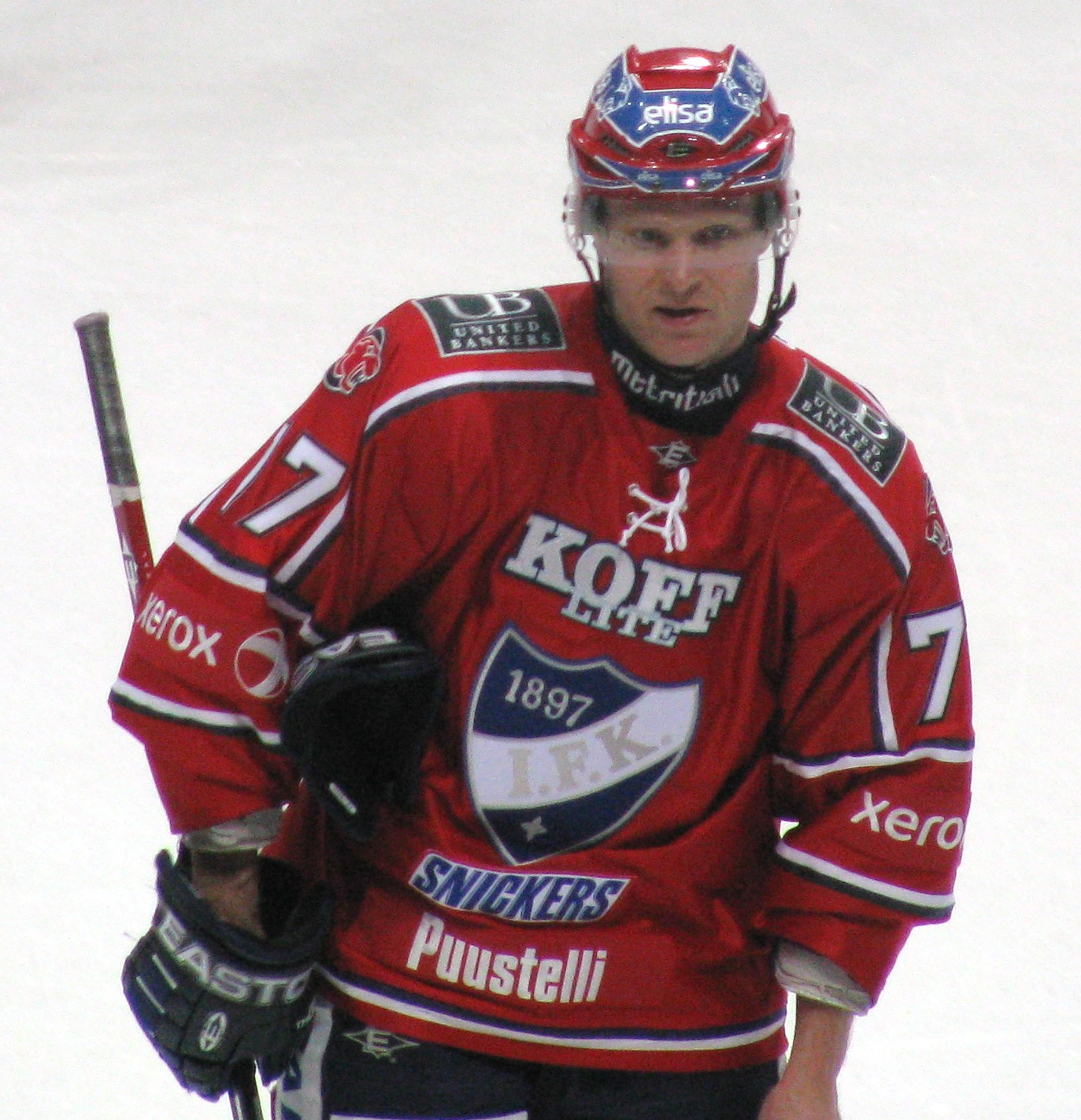
- Martti Järventie (HIFK) in 2010
- Born: April 4, 1976 (age 50) Tampere, Finland
- Height: 5 ft 11 in (180 cm)
- Weight: 192 lb (87 kg; 13 st 10 lb)
- Position: Defence
- Shot: Left
- Played for: Ilves; Lukko; TPS; Montreal Canadiens; Jokerit; Mora IK; Kärpät; HIFK; HPK
- National team: Finland
- NHL draft: 109th overall, 2001; Montreal Canadiens
- Playing career: 1994–2016

Martti Juhani Järventie (born April 4, 1976) is a Finnish former professional ice hockey defenceman. He was selected in the fourth round, 109th overall, by the Montreal Canadiens in the 2001 NHL entry draft and played one game for the Canadiens during the 2001–02 season. The rest of his career, which lasted from 1994 to 2016, was mainly spent in the Finnish SM-liiga.

== Career ==
Järventie began his career with Ilves where he spent a total of nine years, beginning at junior level in 1992. In 1995 he had spells with KOO-VEE and Lukko before returning to Ilves. In 2001, he moved to TPS. Järventie was drafted 109th overall by the Montreal Canadiens in the 2001 NHL entry draft. However, he managed to play only one game in the NHL; less than 24 hours after his debut, he was assigned to the American Hockey League's Quebec Citadelles.

Afterwards, Järventie returned to Ilves before joining Jokerit. After five seasons, Järventie moved to the Swedish Elitserien for Mora IK for one season before returning to the SM-liiga with Kärpät. In 2009, he joined HIFK and won the SM-Liiga championship with the team in 2011. In June 2011 Järventie returned to Tampere after signing a four-year contract with Ilves. During autumn 2015 Järventie played some games in HPK before his transfer to Milton Keynes Lightning.

== Career statistics ==
=== Regular season and playoffs ===
			Regular season					Playoffs
Season	Team	League	GP	G	A	Pts	PIM	GP	G	A	Pts	PIM
1992–93	Ilves	FIN U18	27	1	4	5	92	—	—	—	—	—
1992–93	Ilves	FIN U20	12	0	1	1	6	—	—	—	—	—
1993–94	Ilves	FIN U18	5	2	2	4	14	—	—	—	—	—
1993–94	Ilves	FIN U20	36	6	7	13	34	6	1	2	3	10
1994–95	Ilves	FIN U20	9	2	2	4	26	1	0	0	0	2
1994–95	Ilves	FIN	37	1	6	7	18	—	—	—	—	—
1995–96	Ilves	FIN U20	3	2	2	4	4	—	—	—	—	—
1995–96	Ilves	FIN	21	2	1	3	30	—	—	—	—	—
1995–96	KOOVEE	FIN-2	3	0	0	0	2	—	—	—	—	—
1995–96	Lukko	FIN	15	0	1	1	10	1	0	0	0	0
1996–97	Ilves	FIN U20	2	0	0	0	2	—	—	—	—	—
1996–97	Ilves	FIN	44	2	11	13	34	6	0	1	1	0
1997–98	Ilves	FIN	37	2	5	7	22	9	2	2	4	14
1998–99	Ilves	FIN	43	2	4	6	56	4	0	0	0	0
1999–00	Ilves	FIN	50	14	14	28	77	3	1	1	2	2
2000–01	TPS	FIN	56	5	14	19	71	10	1	2	3	4
2001–02	Montreal Canadiens	NHL	1	0	0	0	0	—	—	—	—	—
2001–02	Québec Citadelles	AHL	59	7	14	21	18	—	—	—	—	—
2002–03	Ilves	FIN	19	2	6	8	30	—	—	—	—	—
2002–03	Jokerit	FIN	15	1	4	5	10	10	0	2	2	4
2003–04	Jokerit	FIN	53	6	16	22	71	6	0	2	2	12
2004–05	Jokerit	FIN	54	5	10	15	113	12	1	4	5	30
2005–06	Jokerit	FIN	31	0	8	8	73	—	—	—	—	—
2006–07	Jokerit	FIN	54	8	17	25	114	10	2	1	3	4
2007–08	Mora IK	SEL	39	5	11	16	50	—	—	—	—	—
2008–09	Kärpät	FIN	17	1	3	4	39	14	0	1	1	12
2009–10	HIFK	FIN	56	8	19	27	91	6	1	2	3	2
2010–11	HIFK	FIN	58	8	26	34	58	14	1	6	7	12
2011–12	Ilves	FIN	49	4	11	15	36	—	—	—	—	—
2012–13	Ilves	FIN	26	2	4	6	32	—	—	—	—	—
2012–13	HIFK	FIN	16	2	0	2	20	7	0	1	1	6
2013–14	Ilves	FIN	39	0	12	12	36	—	—	—	—	—
2014–15	Ilves	FIN	42	0	4	4	24	2	0	0	0	2
2015–16	HPK	FIN	13	0	3	3	4	—	—	—	—	—
2015–16	Milton Keynes Lightning	EPIHL	24	3	13	16	71	4	1	0	1	2
FIN totals			845	75	199	274	1069	114	9	25	34	104
NHL totals			1	0	0	0	0	—	—	—	—	—

=== International ===
Year	Team	Event	GP	G	A	Pts	PIM
1994	Finland	EJC	5	1	1	2	8
1995	Finland	WJC	7	1	1	2	6
1996	Finland	WJC	6	0	1	1	22
Junior totals			18	2	3	5	36
