= Mika Viinanen =

Finnish ice hockey player (born 1979)

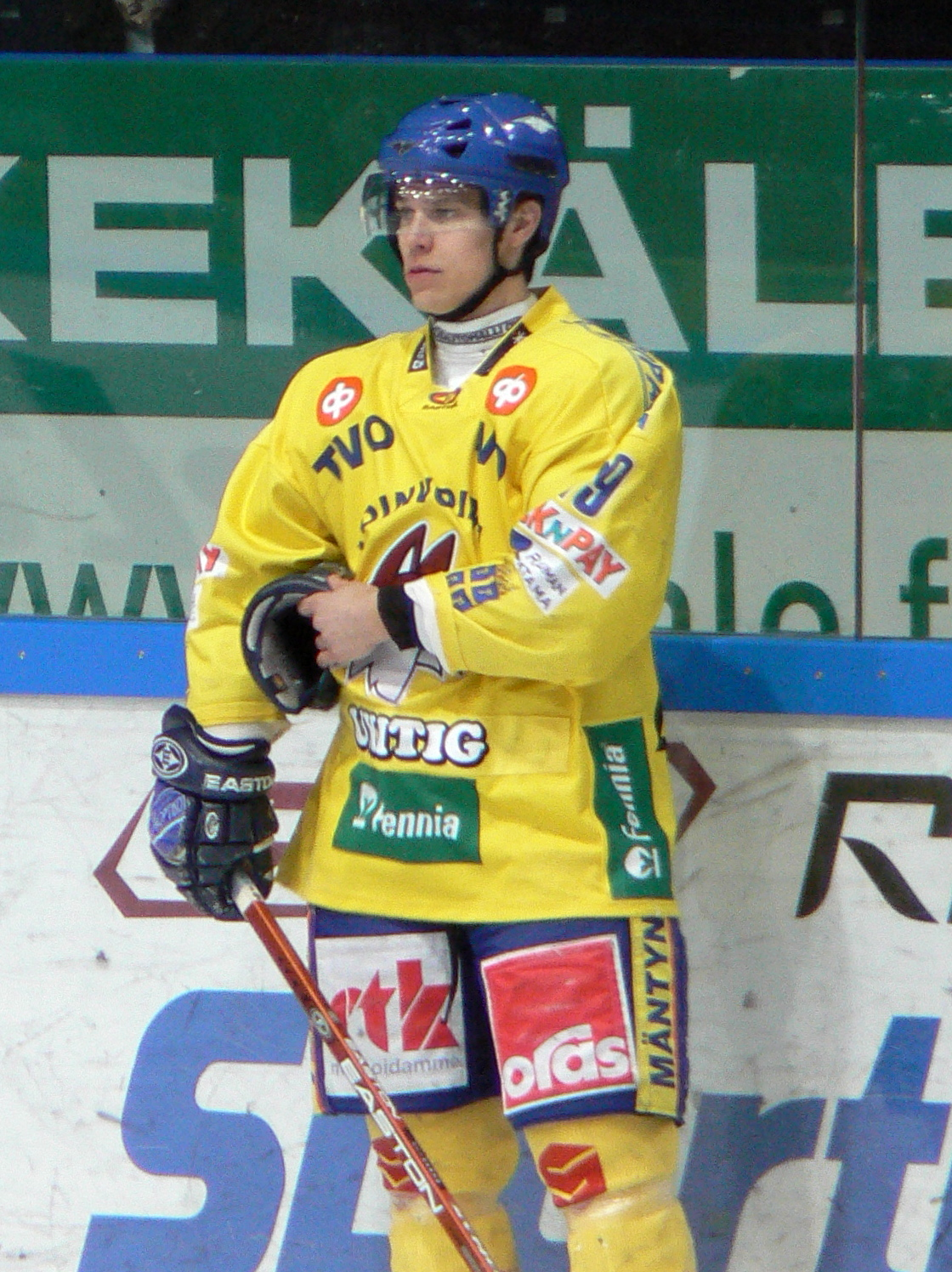
- Playing for Lukko Rauma, March 2008
- Born: July 21, 1979 (age 45); Kaarina, Finland
- Height: 6 ft 1 in (185 cm)
- Weight: 187 lb (85 kg; 13 st 5 lb)
- Position: Centre
- Shot: Left
- Played for: Lukko; Tappara; Kärpät; Traktor Chelyabinsk; Timrå IK; TPS; Ilves
- Playing career: 2000–2013

Mika Viinanen (born July 21, 1979) is a Finnish former professional ice hockey centre. He played in the SM-liiga for Lukko, Tappara, Karpat, TPS and Ilves. He also played for Traktor Chelyabinsk of the Kontinental Hockey League in Russia and for Timrå IK of the Elitserien in Sweden.

== Playing career ==
Viinanen began his career with TPS playing in their junior setup though he was unable to break into the main roster. After a season in Mestis for Sport, he made his SM-liiga debut for Lukko during the 2001-02 SM-liiga season. He remained until 2004 where he signed a three-year contract with Tappara. He then returned to Lukko in 2007 and stayed for two seasons before signing for Kärpät in 2009.

On July 2, 2010, Viinanen signed a one-year contract with Traktor Chelyabinsk of the Kontinental Hockey League. He was released by the team three months later and in November 2010 he signed an initial eleven-week contract with Timrå IK of the Elitserien. In January 2011, he signed a contract extension with Timrå to remain with the team for the remainder of the season.

In 2011, Viinanen returned to TPS, eleven years after leaving their junior team. He also had a brief loan spell with EHC Visp in the Switzerland's National League B before joining Ilves the following season, after which he retired from hockey.

== Career statistics ==
			Regular season					Playoffs
Season	Team	League	GP	G	A	Pts	PIM	GP	G	A	Pts	PIM
2000–01	Sport	Mestis	43	16	16	32	91	7	0	2	2	2
2001–02	Lukko	SM-l	52	16	11	27	64	-	-	-	-	-
2002–03	Lukko	SM-l	56	8	10	18	82	-	-	-	-	-
2003–04	Lukko	SM-l	55	5	10	15	32	4	1	0	0	0
2004–05	Tappara	SM-l	55	13	9	22	84	8	1	0	1	4
2005–06	Tappara	SM-l	56	9	11	20	72	6	0	1	1	8
2006–07	Tappara	SM-l	53	7	10	17	64	5	0	0	0	12
2007–08	Lukko	SM-l	56	10	19	29	48	-	-	-	-	-
2008–09	Lukko	SM-l	57	9	8	17	73	-	-	-	-	-
2009–10	Oulun Kärpät	SM-l	52	12	17	29	64	10	6	0	6	8
2010-11	Chelyabinsk Traktor	KHL	16	2	3	5	10	-	-	-	-	-
2010-11	Timrå IK	SEL	35	7	7	14	22	-	-	-	-	-
