= Viktor Chistov =

- Born: 12 January 1972 (age 53); Gorky, USSR
- Height: 5 ft 11 in (180 cm)
- Weight: 185 lb (84 kg; 13 st 3 lb)
- Position: Goaltender
- Caught: Left
- Played for: Superleague; Krylia Sovetov; CSK VVS Samara; HK Lipetsk; Severstal Cherepovets; HK MVD; Supreme League; Torpedo Nizhny Novgorod; HK Dmitrov
- National team: Russia
- Playing career: 1990–2008

Viktor Valentinovich Chistov (Russian: Виктор Валентинович Чистов; born 12 January 1972 in Gorky in USSR) is a Russian former professional ice hockey player.

Currently the Sports Director of the KHL Players and Coaches Union.

== Playing career ==
=== Club career ===
In 1994, he began his career with the Krylia Sovetov in the Russian Championship. The team also played in the International Hockey League during the 1994–1995 season. He then played for CSK VVS Samara then HK Lipetsk. From 1999 to 2005, he wore the colors of Severstal Tcherepovets before joining the HK MVD with whom he wins the Supreme League 2005. He did it again in 2007 with Torpedo Nizhni Novgorod. He ended his playing career in 2008 after a season at HK Dmitrov.

=== International career ===
He represented the Russia at the international level. Russia wins the silver medal at the 2002 World Championship.

== Trophies and personal honors ==
- 2004: participated in the All-Star Match of the Superleague with the West team.
