= Petri Pakaslahti =

Finnish ice hockey player

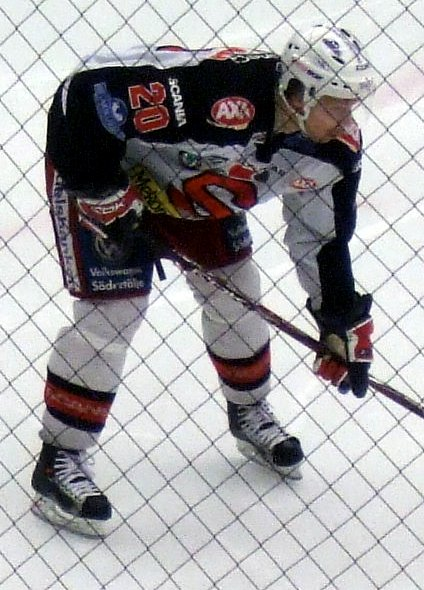
- Born: January 22, 1976 (age 49); Vaasa, FIN
- Height: 6 ft 2 in (188 cm)
- Weight: 202 lb (92 kg; 14 st 6 lb)
- Position: Centre
- Shot: Left
- Played for: Södertälje SK; Lukko; Jokerit
- Playing career: 1996–2011

Petri Jaakko Pakaslahti (born January 22, 1976, in Vaasa, Finland) is a retired Finnish professional ice hockey forward who currently serves as a European Scout for the Pittsburgh Penguins.

Pakaslahti was a good defensive center who specialized in faceoffs. He played in the checking line for Team Finland in the 2005 Men's World Ice Hockey Championships and took defensive zone faceoffs for other lines as well. He also played extensively on the penalty kill.

He started his pro hockey career in Lukko in the Finnish SM-liiga and moved to Jokerit in 2001, where he played until 2007. In summer 2007, he signed a contract with Elitserien team Södertälje SK. In 2011, Pakaslahti retired due to a nagging groin injury. He was hired by the Pittsburgh Penguins in 2015 as a European Scout, a role he still serves in as of 2024-25.

== Career statistics ==
| | | | Regular Season | | | | | Playoffs |
| Season | Team | League | GP | G | A | Pts | PIM | GP | G | A | Pts | PIM |
|---|---|---|---|---|---|---|---|---|---|---|---|---|
| 1995-96 | Lukko | SM-liiga | 1 | 0 | 0 | 0 | 0 | -- | -- | -- | -- | -- |
| 1996-97 | Lukko | SM-liiga | 42 | 2 | 1 | 3 | 0 | -- | -- | -- | -- | -- |
| 1997-98 | Lukko | SM-liiga | 46 | 6 | 5 | 11 | 14 | -- | -- | -- | -- | -- |
| 1998-99 | Lukko | SM-liiga | 49 | 8 | 8 | 16 | 38 | -- | -- | -- | -- | -- |
| 1999-00 | Lukko | SM-liiga | 40 | 2 | 9 | 11 | 20 | 4 | 1 | 0 | 1 | 13 |
| 2000-01 | Lukko | SM-liiga | 45 | 8 | 18 | 26 | 24 | 3 | 0 | 1 | 1 | 0 |
| 2001-02 | Jokerit | SM-liiga | 51 | 13 | 22 | 35 | 22 | 12 | 2 | 4 | 6 | 10 |
| 2002-03 | Jokerit | SM-liiga | 52 | 7 | 21 | 28 | 26 | 9 | 4 | 4 | 8 | 6 |
| 2003-04 | Jokerit | SM-liiga | 54 | 4 | 20 | 24 | 52 | 8 | 0 | 4 | 4 | 6 |
| 2004-05 | Jokerit | SM-liiga | 55 | 3 | 13 | 16 | 45 | 12 | 1 | 2 | 3 | 6 |
| 2005-06 | Jokerit | SM-liiga | 28 | 5 | 9 | 14 | 26 | -- | -- | -- | -- | -- |
| 2006-07 | Jokerit | SM-liiga | 51 | 12 | 22 | 34 | 52 | 10 | 1 | 3 | 4 | 8 |
| 2007-08 | Södertälje SK | SEL | 54 | 18 | 16 | 34 | 48 | -- | -- | -- | -- | -- |
| 2008-09 | Södertälje SK | SEL | 53 | 11 | 14 | 25 | 36 | -- | -- | -- | -- | -- |
