= Andreas Salomonsson =

Swedish ice hockey player

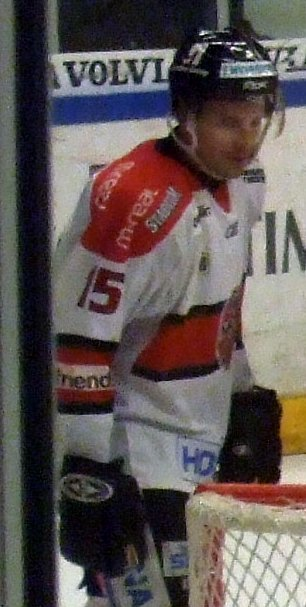
- Born: December 19, 1973 (age 51); Örnsköldsvik, Sweden
- Height: 6 ft 0 in (183 cm)
- Weight: 196 lb (89 kg; 14 st 0 lb)
- Position: Left wing
- Shot: Left
- Played for: Djurgårdens IF; Modo Hockey; New Jersey Devils; Washington Capitals
- NHL draft: 163rd overall, 2001; New Jersey Devils
- Playing career: 1991–2010

Jan Sverker Andreas Salomonsson (born December 19, 1973) is a Swedish former professional ice hockey player. He played 71 games in the National Hockey League with the New Jersey Devils and Washington Capitals during the 2001–02 and 2002–03 seasons. The rest of his career, which lasted from 1991 to 2010, was mainly spent in the Swedish Elitserien. Internationally Salomonsson played for the Swedish national team at the 2001 and 2004 World Championship, winning a bronze and silver medal, respectively.

== Playing career ==
Originally drafted in 2001 by the New Jersey Devils, Salomonsson was claimed on waivers by the Washington Capitals in 2002. Following the 2002–3 season, Salomonsson returned to play for Modo Hockey in the Swedish Elitserien, where he had previously played for many years before his brief time in North America.

On February 11, 2010, Salomonsson retired due to an unhealed groin injury.

== Career statistics ==
=== Regular season and playoffs ===
			Regular season					Playoffs
Season	Team	League	GP	G	A	Pts	PIM	GP	G	A	Pts	PIM
1990–91	Modo Hockey	SWE U20	—	—	—	—	—	—	—	—	—	—
1990–91	Modo Hockey	SEL	2	0	0	0	0	—	—	—	—	—
1991–92	Modo Hockey	SEL	20	1	1	2	26	—	—	—	—	—
1992–93	Modo Hockey	SWE U20	10	4	16	20	8	—	—	—	—	—
1992–93	Modo Hockey	SEL	33	1	1	2	0	—	—	—	—	—
1993–94	Modo Hockey	SEL	38	15	8	23	33	11	1	2	3	4
1994–95	Modo Hockey	SEL	40	5	9	14	34	—	—	—	—	—
1995–96	Modo Hockey	SEL	38	13	6	19	22	7	0	4	4	4
1996–97	Modo Hockey	SEL	23	6	6	12	22	—	—	—	—	—
1996–97	EC Ratingen	DEL	21	5	1	6	49	—	—	—	—	—
1997–98	Modo Hockey	SEL	45	5	16	21	69	8	4	3	7	4
1998–99	Modo Hockey	SEL	46	13	13	26	60	13	4	5	9	12
1999–00	Modo Hockey	SEL	48	9	15	24	38	12	0	4	4	12
2000–01	Djurgårdens IF	SEL	48	10	12	22	46	13	3	4	7	31
2001–02	New Jersey Devils	NHL	39	4	5	9	22	4	0	1	1	0
2001–02	Albany River Rats	AHL	19	3	10	13	6	—	—	—	—	—
2002–03	Washington Capitals	NHL	32	1	4	5	14	—	—	—	—	—
2002–03	Portland Pirates	AHL	31	7	17	24	23	3	4	0	4	0
2003–04	Modo Hockey	SEL	47	13	26	39	48	6	1	5	6	6
2004–05	Modo Hockey	SEL	30	7	9	16	46	6	1	4	5	4
2005–06	Modo Hockey	SEL	46	12	19	31	105	5	1	1	2	4
2006–07	Modo Hockey	SEL	30	9	11	20	24	8	0	2	2	14
2007–08	Modo Hockey	SEL	48	15	28	43	83	5	1	2	3	6
2008–09	Modo Hockey	SEL	44	13	17	30	44	—	—	—	—	—
2009–10	Modo Hockey	SEL	8	0	3	3	10	—	—	—	—	—
SEL totals			634	147	200	347	710	94	16	36	52	101
NHL totals			71	5	9	14	36	4	0 ! 1	1	0

=== International ===
Medal record

Representing Sweden

Ice hockey

World Championships
Silver medal – second place	2004 Czech Republic	
Bronze medal – third place	2001 Germany	

World Junior Championships
Bronze medal – third place	1993 Sweden	

Year	Team	Event	GP	G	A	Pts	PIM
1991	Sweden	EJC	6	3	5	8	18
1993	Sweden	WJC	5	0	3	3	2
2001	Sweden	WC	9	4	0	4	4
2004	Sweden	WC	9	3	1	4	12
Junior totals			11	3	8	11	20
Senior totals			18	7	1	8	16
