= Alexei Tertyshny =

Russian ice hockey player and coach

- Born: 27 March 1977 (age 47); Chelyabinsk, Russian SFSR, Soviet Union
- Height: 5 ft 11 in (180 cm)
- Weight: 176 lb (80 kg; 12 st 8 lb)
- Position: Right wing
- Shot: Left
- Played for: Traktor Chelyabinsk; Ak Bars Kazan; Metallurg Magnitogorsk; Avangard Omsk; CSKA Moscow; Sibir Novosibirsk; HK MVD
- NHL draft: Undrafted
- Playing career: 1995–2011

Alexei Viktorovich Tertyshny (Russian: Алексей Викторович Тертышный; born 27 March 1977) is a Russian former professional ice hockey winger and the current acting head coach of Traktor Chelyabinsk of the Kontinental Hockey League (KHL). He retired following the 2010–11 season played with Traktor Chelyabinsk of the Kontinental Hockey League (KHL).

== Career statistics ==
			Regular season					Playoffs
Season	Team	League	GP	G	A	Pts	PIM	GP	G	A	Pts	PIM
1994–95	UralAZ Miass	Russia2	50	15	8	23	2	—	—	—	—	—
1994–95	Traktor Chelyabinsk	Russia	3	0	0	0	2	—	—	—	—	—
1995–96	Traktor Chelyabinsk	Russia	42	6	3	9	29	—	—	—	—	—
1995–96	Nadezhda Chelyabinsk	Russia2	13	2	0	2	6	—	—	—	—	—
1996–97	Traktor Chelyabinsk	Russia	41	6	8	14	6	2	0	0	0	0
1997–98	Traktor Chelyabinsk	Russia	45	16	6	22	6	2	0	0	0	0
1997–98	Traktor Chelyabinsk	WPHL	8	4	2	6	2	—	—	—	—	—
1998–99	Traktor Chelyabinsk	Russia	41	10	5	15	10	—	—	—	—	—
1998–99	Traktor Chelyabinsk-2	Russia3	3	4	4	8	0	—	—	—	—	—
1999–00	Ak Bars Kazan	Russia	36	9	5	14	4	17	2	1	3	8
1999–00	Ak Bars Kazan-2	Russia3	1	4	0	4	0	—	—	—	—	—
2000–01	Ak Bars Kazan	Russia	38	11	8	19	2	4	1	0	1	0
2000–01	Ak Bars Kazan-2	Russia3	2	4	1	5	2	—	—	—	—	—
2001–02	Ak Bars Kazan	Russia	46	8	8	16	12	11	2	1	3	0
2001–02	Ak Bars Kazan-2	Russia3	1	0	1	1	2	—	—	—	—	—
2002–03	Ak Bars Kazan	Russia	29	8	3	11	4	1	0	0	0	0
2003–04	Metallurg Magnitogorsk	Russia	36	3	6	9	14	11	2	2	4	4
2003–04	Metallurg Magnitogorsk-2	Russia3	3	3	0	3	0	—	—	—	—	—
2004–05	Metallurg Magnitogorsk	Russia	58	18	12	30	10	4	0	0	0	0
2005–06	Metallurg Magnitogorsk	Russia	43	9	4	13	8	10	0	2	2	2
2006–07	Metallurg Magnitogorsk	Russia	49	5	6	11	26	15	1	0	1	8
2007–08	Avangard Omsk	Russia	50	8	9	17	41	4	3	0	3	2
2008–09	HC CSKA Moscow	KHL	21	3	5	8	10	—	—	—	—	—
2008–09	HC Sibir Novosibirsk	KHL	32	5	10	15	33	—	—	—	—	—
2009–10	HK MVD	KHL	56	8	14	22	14	18	2	2	4	10
2010–11	Traktor Chelyabinsk	KHL	36	4	5	9	14	—	—	—	—	—
Russia totals			557	117	83	200	174	81	11	6	17	24
KHL totals			145	20	34	54	71	18	2	2	4	10
