= Martin Štrba (ice hockey) =

Czech ice hockey right winger

- Born: March 22, 1976 (age 49) České Budějovice, Czechoslovakia
- Height: 5 ft 11 in (180 cm)
- Weight: 198 lb (90 kg; 14 st 2 lb)
- Position: Right wing
- Shot: Left
- Played for: HC České Budějovice; HC Spartak Moscow; HC Bílí Tygři Liberec; HC Sparta Praha; BK Mladá Boleslav; HKM Zvolen
- National team: Czech Republic
- Playing career: 1995–2013

Martin Štrba (born March 22, 1976) is a Czech coach and former professional ice hockey right winger working as the head coach of the HC Slavia Praha.

== Career ==
Štrba played in the Czech Extraliga for HC České Budějovice, HC Bílí Tygři Liberec, HC Sparta Praha and BK Mladá Boleslav. He also played in the Russian Superleague for HC Spartak Moscow and the Tipsport Liga for HKM Zvolen.

After retiring in 2013, Štrba became assistant coach for Motor České Budějovice in 2016 and later head coach for Piráti Chomutov in 2019. On April 8, 2020, Štrba was named head coach of Slavia Praha.
