= Dmitry Zatonsky =

Russian ice hockey forward (born 1971)

- Born: March 30, 1971 (age 54) Novosibirsk, Soviet Union
- Height: 5 ft 10 in (178 cm)
- Weight: 180 lb (82 kg; 12 st 12 lb)
- Position: Left wing
- Shot: Left
- Played for: HC Lada Togliatti; HC Sibir Novosibirsk; Avangard Omsk; Salavat Yulaev Ufa
- Playing career: 1993–2006

Dmitry Viktorovich Zatonsky (Russian: Дмитрий Викторович Затонский; born March 30, 1971) is a Russian former ice hockey forward. He played 532 games and scored 171 goals in Russian championship. He scored most goals in season 1999-2000 (23 goals) and season 2004-2005 (26 goals) in Russian championship.

== Honours ==
- MHL: 1994 (With Lada)
- Russian championship: 2004 (With Avangard)
- European Champions cup: 2005 (With Avangard)

== Career statistics ==
=== Regular season and playoffs ===
			Regular season					Playoffs
Season	Team	League	GP	G	A	Pts	PIM	GP	G	A	Pts	PIM
1986–87	Sibir Novosibirsk	USR.2	2	0	0	0	0	—	—	—	—	—
1987–88	Sibir Novosibirsk	USR.2	7	0	0	0	0	—	—	—	—	—
1988–89	Sibir Novosibirsk	USR.2	24	0	0	0	0	—	—	—	—	—
1988–89	Mashinostroitel Novosibirsk	USR.3	7	3	1	4	—	—	—	—	—	—
1989–90	Sibir Novosibirsk	USR.2	63	6	10	16	18	—	—	—	—	—
1990–91	SKA MVO Kalinin	USR.2	54	21	3	24	18	—	—	—	—	—
1991–92	Sibir Novosibirsk	CIS.2	77	28	16	44	20	—	—	—	—	—
1992–93	Sibir Novosibirsk	RUS.2	68	37	26	63	26	—	—	—	—	—
1993–94	Lada Togliatti	IHL	4	2	1	3	0	11	1	0	1	6
1993–94	Sibir Novosibirsk	RUS.2	41	24	13	37	22	—	—	—	—	—
1994–95	Sibir Novosibirsk	IHL	52	23	12	35	32	—	—	—	—	—
1995–96	Sibir Novosibirsk	IHL	51	11	8	19	22	—	—	—	—	—
1996–97	Sibir Novosibirsk	RSL	44	17	16	33	16	—	—	—	—	—
1997–98	Avangard Omsk	RSL	41	12	10	22	18	5	2	1	3	2
1998–99	Avangard Omsk	RSL	41	13	14	27	41	6	1	3	4	4
1999–2000	Avangard Omsk	RSL	36	20	19	39	38	8	3	3	6	24
2000–01	Avangard Omsk	RSL	33	14	8	22	24	16	1	5	6	6
2001–02	Avangard Omsk	RSL	50	16	25	41	32	11	3	4	7	8
2002–03	Avangard Omsk	RSL	47	18	18	36	61	12	3	2	5	2
2003–04	Avangard Omsk	RSL	58	21	27	48	8	11	0	5	5	2
2004–05	Avangard Omsk	RSL	59	23	23	46	70	11	3	2	5	14
2005–06	Avangard Omsk	RSL	46	4	4	7	28	—	—	—	—	—
2005–06	Avangard–2 Omsk	RUS.3	3	1	0	1	4	—	—	—	—	—
2006–07	Salavat Yulaev Ufa	RSL	2	0	0	0	2	—	—	—	—	—
2006–07	Salavat Yulaev–2 Ufa	RUS.3	4	2	5	7	0	—	—	—	—	—
USR.2/CIS.2 totals			227	55	29	84	56	—	—	—	—	—
IHL totals			107	36	21	57	54	11	1	0	1	6
RSL totals			457	157	164	321	378	80	16	25	41	62

=== International ===
Year	Team	Event	Result	GP	G	A	Pts	PIM
2002	Russia	WC	2nd place, silver medalist(s)	9	2	3	5	22
