= Pavel Vostřák =

Czech ice hockey player

- Born: December 8, 1972 (age 53) Vlašim, Czechoslovakia
- Height: 6 ft 2 in (188 cm)
- Weight: 201 lb (91 kg; 14 st 5 lb)
- Position: Forward
- Shot: Left
- Played for: HC Plzeň; JYP; Jokerit; HC Dukla Jihlava; HC Košice; HC Ambrì-Piotta; Stjernen Hockey
- Playing career: 1996–2014

Pavel Vostřák (born December 8, 1972) is a Czech professional ice hockey player. He played with HC Plzeň in the Czech Extraliga during the 2010–11 Czech Extraliga season.

Vostřák previously played for HC Karlovy Vary, Jokerit, HC Dukla Jihlava, BK Mladá Boleslav, HC Košice, HC Ambri-Piotta and HC Kometa Brno.

He also played for the Lausitzer Füchse in the 2nd Ice Hockey Bundesliga in Germany.
