= Viktor Hübl =

Czech ice hockey player (born 1978)

- Born: 12 August 1978 (age 47) Chomutov, Czechoslovakia
- Height: 6 ft 0 in (183 cm)
- Weight: 179 lb (81 kg; 12 st 11 lb)
- Position: Centre
- Shoots: Left
- Czech team: HC Litvínov
- National team: Czech Republic
- NHL draft: 284th overall, 2001; Washington Capitals
- Playing career: 1998–present

Viktor Hübl (born 12 August 1978) is a Czech professional ice hockey player and former National Team member. Hübl played with HC Litvínov in the Czech Extraliga during the 2010–11 Czech Extraliga season.

He was selected by the Washington Capitals in the 9th round (284th overall) of the 2001 NHL entry draft.

His uncle and cousin, both named Jaroslav Hübl, were also professionals in the sport.

== Career statistics ==
			Regular season					Playoffs
Season	Team	League	GP	G	A	Pts	PIM	GP	G	A	Pts	PIM
1995–96	KLH VT VTJ Chomutov	CZE U20	40	13	18	31		—	—	—	—	—
1996–97	KLH Chomutov	CZE U20	25	10	11	21		—	—	—	—	—
1997–98	KLH Chomutov	CZE U20	16	19	12	31		—	—	—	—	—
1997–98	KLH Chomutov	CZE.2	50	18	17	35		—	—	—	—	—
1998–99	KLH Chomutov	CZE.2	5	2	1	3		—	—	—	—	—
1998–99	HC Chemopetrol, a.s.	ELH	27	2	6	8	8	—	—	—	—	—
1999–2000	KLH Chomutov	CZE.2	8	2	4	6	4	—	—	—	—	—
1999–2000	HC Chemopetrol, a.s.	ELH	36	6	9	15	16	—	—	—	—	—
2000–01	HC Slavia Praha	ELH	50	16	24	40	24	11	0	2	2	6
2001–02	HC Slavia Praha	ELH	48	11	14	25	34	8	0	1	1	6
2002–03	HC Chemopetrol, a.s.	ELH	39	8	13	21	30	—	—	—	—	—
2003–04	HC Chemopetrol, a.s.	ELH	52	9	17	26	24	—	—	—	—	—
2004–05	HC Chemopetrol, a.s.	ELH	52	16	15	31	14	6	1	1	2	6
2005–06	HC České Budějovice	ELH	52	16	19	35	44	4	0	2	2	8
2006–07	HC Mountfield	ELH	52	16	19	35	46	11	4	1	5	24
2007–08	HC Mountfield	ELH	52	20	13	33	40	12	1	3	4	8
2008–09	HC Litvínov	ELH	45	19	16	35	36	2	1	0	1	4
2009–10	HC BENZINA Litvínov	ELH	49	16	18	34	38	5	1	4	5	4
2010–11	HC BENZINA Litvínov	ELH	52	16	29	45	32	8	2	2	4	8
2011–12	HC Verva Litvínov	ELH	49	21	27	48	52	—	—	—	—	—
2012–13	HC Verva Litvínov	ELH	52	22	36	58	62	7	2	4	6	10
2013–14	HC Verva Litvínov	ELH	46	14	24	38	36	—	—	—	—	—
2014–15	HC Verva Litvínov	ELH	51	21	37	58	30	17	4	6	10	12
2015–16	HC Verva Litvínov	ELH	41	19	13	32	34	—	—	—	—	—
2016–17	HC Verva Litvínov	ELH	52	17	21	38	30	5	1	2	3	0
2017–18	HC Verva Litvínov	ELH	45	15	24	39	34	—	—	—	—	—
2018–19	HC Verva Litvínov	ELH	52	14	13	27	36	—	—	—	—	—
2019–20	HC Verva Litvínov	ELH	52	19	18	37	32	—	—	—	—	—
2020–21	HC Verva Litvínov	ELH	51	14	23	37	54	2	0	0	0	0
2021–22	HC Verva Litvínov	ELH	56	8	16	24	24	—	—	—	—	—
ELH totals			1153	355	464	819	810	98	17	28	45	96
