= Andrei Razin (ice hockey) =

Russian ice hockey player

- Born: October 23, 1973 (age 52) Tolyatti, URS
- Height: 5 ft 11 in (180 cm)
- Weight: 189 lb (86 kg; 13 st 7 lb)
- Position: Centre
- Shot: Left
- Played for: HC Lada Togliatti; Metallurg Magnitogorsk; HC Dynamo Moscow; HC CSKA Moscow; Avangard Omsk; HC MVD
- Current KHL coach: SKA Saint Petersburg
- Coached for: Avtomobilist Yekaterinburg; HC Yugra; Severstal Cherepovets; Metallurg Magnitogorsk
- National team: Russia
- NHL draft: 177th overall, 2001; Philadelphia Flyers
- Playing career: 1992–2007

Andrei Vladimirovich Razin (Russian: Андре́й Влади́мирович Ра́зин; born 23 October 1973), is a Russian ice hockey coach and former professional player. He is currently the head coach of SKA Saint Petersburg of the Kontinental Hockey League (KHL). He previously served as head coach of Metallurg Magnitogorsk, where he won the 2024 Gagarin Cup. Razin was selected by the Philadelphia Flyers in the 6th round (177th overall) of the 2001 NHL entry draft.

== Career statistics ==
=== Regular season and playoffs ===
			Regular season					Playoffs
Season	Team	League	GP	G	A	Pts	PIM	GP	G	A	Pts	PIM
1990–91	Mayak Kuibyshev	URS.3	2	0	0	0	2	—	—	—	—	—
1991–92	Mayak Kuibyshev	CIS.3	42	15	16	31	26	—	—	—	—	—
1992–93	CSK VVS Samara	RUS.2	29	8	7	15	12	—	—	—	—	—
1992–93	Lada Togliatti	IHL	12	1	2	3	0	1	0	0	0	0
1993–94	Lada Togliatti	IHL	15	1	1	2	8	—	—	—	—	—
1994–95	Metallurg Magnitogorsk	IHL	49	11	14	25	12	7	3	2	5	16
1995–96	Metallurg Magnitogorsk	IHL	40	6	11	17	28	4	0	0	0	2
1996–97	CSK VVS Samara	RSL	32	7	8	15	12	2	0	1	1	2
1997–98	Metallurg Magnitogorsk	RSL	46	6	32	38	12	10	3	5	8	4
1998–99	Metallurg Magnitogorsk	RSL	39	7	25	32	14	16	4	3	7	6
1998–99	Metallurg–2 Magnitogorsk	RUS.3	1	2	2	4	0	—	—	—	—	—
1999–2000	Metallurg Magnitogorsk	RSL	28	11	10	21	8	12	3	2	5	4
1999–2000	Metallurg–2 Magnitogorsk	RUS.3	4	3	5	8	0	—	—	—	—	—
2000–01	Metallurg Magnitogorsk	RSL	44	16	31	47	80	12	7	6	13	20
2001–02	Dynamo Moscow	RSL	51	11	32	43	96	3	2	2	4	0
2002–03	Dynamo Moscow	RSL	40	9	28	37	55	5	1	3	4	24
2003–04	CSKA Moscow	RSL	57	10	43	53	70	—	—	—	—	—
2004–05	Avangard Omsk	RSL	20	2	5	7	10	—	—	—	—	—
2004–05	Avangard–2 Omsk	RUS.3	1	0	3	3	0	—	—	—	—	—
2004–05	Metallurg Magnitogorsk	RSL	32	5	9	14	18	5	1	2	3	14
2005–06	HC MVD	RSL	4	0	3	3	0	—	—	—	—	—
2006–07	Khimik Voskresensk	RUS.2	2	2	1	3	0	12	5	11	16	2
2006–07	Khimik–2 Voskresensk	RUS.3	1	0	1	1	0	—	—	—	—	—
IHL totals			116	19	28	47	48	12	3	2	5	18
RSL totals			393	84	226	310	375	65	21	24	45	74

=== International ===
Year	Team	Event	GP	G	A	Pts	PIM
2001	Russia	WC	7	3	4	7	0
Senior totals			7	4	3	7	0
