= Valeri Karpov =

Soviet ice hockey player (1971–2014)

- Born: 5 August 1971 Chelyabinsk, Soviet Union
- Died: 10 October 2014 (aged 43) Chelyabinsk, Russia
- Height: 5 ft 10 in (178 cm)
- Weight: 176 lb (80 kg; 12 st 8 lb)
- Position: Right wing
- Shot: Left
- Played for: Mighty Ducks of Anaheim; Traktor Chelyabinsk; HC CSKA Moscow; Metallurg Magnitogorsk; HC Lada Togliatti; HC Dynamo Moscow; HC Mechel
- National team: Russia
- NHL draft: 56th overall, 1993; Mighty Ducks of Anaheim
- Playing career: 1988–2005

Valeri Yevgenievich Karpov (Russian: Валерий Евгеньевич Карпов, 5 August 1971 – 10 October 2014) was an ice hockey player who played in the Soviet Hockey League and National Hockey League. He competed for Traktor Chelyabinsk and HC CSKA Moscow in Russia before moving to North America. He was drafted 56th overall by the Mighty Ducks of Anaheim in the 1993 NHL entry draft and joined the team the next season, but struggled to maintain a place in the Ducks roster, bouncing around the minor leagues. He played 76 regular season games for the Ducks over three seasons, scoring 14 goals and 15 assists for 29 points, collecting 32 penalty minutes. He returned to Russia in 1997, spending three seasons with Metallurg Magnitogorsk, helping them win the RSL title in 1999. After spells with HC Lada Togliatti and HC Dynamo Moscow, he returned to Metallurg Magnitogorsk in 2001, where he stayed for another four years. He was inducted into the Russian and Soviet Hockey Hall of Fame in 1993 and retired in 2005.

In the summer of 2014, during a brawl in his house he took a hit to the head and had a bad fall that resulted in a coma. He underwent two trepanning surgeries, but did not regain consciousness and died on 10 October 2014.

== Career statistics ==
=== Regular season and playoffs ===
			Regular season					Playoffs
Season	Team	League	GP	G	A	Pts	PIM	GP	G	A	Pts	PIM
1988–89	Traktor Chelyabinsk	Soviet	5	0	0	0	0	—	—	—	—	—
1989–89	Metallurg Chelyabinsk	URS.2	26	7	9	16	8	—	—	—	—	—
1989–90	Traktor Chelyabinsk	Soviet	24	1	2	3	6	—	—	—	—	—
1989–90	Metallurg Chelyabinsk	URS.2	1	3	1	4	0	—	—	—	—	—
1990–91	Traktor Chelyabinsk	Soviet	25	8	4	12	15	—	—	—	—	—
1991–92	Traktor Chelyabinsk	CIS	36	13	9	22	26	8	3	1	4	6
1991–92	Mechel Chelyabinsk	CIS.2	4	1	0	1	2	—	—	—	—	—
1992–93	CSKA Moscow	RUS	9	2	6	8	0	—	—	—	—	—
1992–93	Traktor Chelyabinsk	RUS	29	10	15	25	6	8	0	1	1	10
1993–94	Traktor Chelyabinsk	RUS	32	11	19	30	18	6	2	5	7	2
1994–95	Traktor Chelyabinsk	RUS	10	6	8	14	8	—	—	—	—	—
1994–95	Mighty Ducks of Anaheim	NHL	30	4	7	11	6	—	—	—	—	—
1994–95	San Diego Gulls	IHL	5	3	3	6	0	—	—	—	—	—
1995–96	Might Ducks of Anaheim	NHL	37	9	8	17	10	—	—	—	—	—
1996–97	Mighty Ducks of Anaheim	NHL	9	1	0	1	16	—	—	—	—	—
1996–97	Baltimore Bandits	AHL	10	4	8	12	8	—	—	—	—	—
1996–97	Long Beach Ice Dogs	IHL	30	18	17	35	19	18	8	7	15	18
1997–98	Metallurg Magnitogorsk	RSL	34	11	14	25	20	4	3	3	6	0
1998–99	Metallurg Magnitogorsk	RSL	39	16	14	30	38	16	6	10	16	14
1999–2000	Metallurg Magnitogorsk	RSL	38	9	15	24	22	10	2	4	6	8
2000–01	Lada Togliatti	RSL	40	8	6	14	20	5	0	1	1	6
2001–02	Dynamo Moscow	RSL	19	2	7	9	6	—	—	—	—	—
2001–02	Metallurg Magnitogorsk	RSL	30	3	7	10	22	9	3	0	3	2
2002–03	Metallurg Magnitogorsk	RSL	50	10	20	30	32	3	0	0	0	0
2003–04	Metallurg Magnitogorsk	RSL	60	15	24	39	46	11	0	0	0	10
2004–05	Metallurg Magnitogorsk	RSL	42	6	9	15	20	5	0	1	1	4
2005–06	Mechel Chelyabinsk	RUS.2	28	10	4	14	34	—	—	—	—	—
2005–06	Traktor Chelyabinsk	RUS.2	21	5	10	15	16	13	4	9	13	4
Soviet/CIS totals			90	22	15	37	47	8	3	1	4	6
NHL totals			76	14	15	29	32	—	—	—	—	—
RSL totals			352	80	116	196	226	63	14	19	33	44

=== International ===
Year	Team	Event	Result	GP	G	A	Pts	PIM
1989	Soviet Union	EJC	1st place, gold medalist(s)	6	2	2	4	6
1991	Soviet Union	WJC	2nd place, silver medalist(s)	7	0	4	4	2
1993	Russia	WC	1st place, gold medalist(s)	8	4	5	9	0
1994	Russia	OG	4th	8	3	1	4	2
1996	Russia	WC	4th	8	3	0	3	8
1999	Russia	WC	5th	6	0	0	0	0
2001	Russia	WC	6th	7	3	0	3	4
2002	Russia	WC	2nd place, silver medalist(s)	9	4	2	6	22
Junior totals				13	2	6	8	8
Senior totals				46	17	8	25	36
