= NHL Challenge =

Series of NHL exhibition games

The NHL Challenge series allows select NHL teams to travel outside North America to conduct training camp and participate in exhibition games. Although the games are played on the larger European ice surface, they are officiated by NHL referees and linesmen using NHL rules.

== List of games ==
2000

- September 13, Vancouver Canucks vs Modo Hockey 5–2 (Stockholm Globe Arena)
- September 15, Vancouver Canucks vs Djurgårdens IF 2–1 (Stockholm Globe Arena)

2001

- September 17, Colorado Avalanche vs Brynäs IF 5–3 (Stockholm Globe Arena)

2003

- September 16, Toronto Maple Leafs vs Jokerit 5–3 (Hartwall Areena)
- September 18, Toronto Maple Leafs vs Djurgårdens IF 9–2 (Stockholm Globe Arena)
- September 19, Toronto Maple Leafs vs Färjestad BK 3–0 (Stockholm Globe Arena)

2010

- October 2, Boston Bruins vs Belfast Giants 5-1 (Odyssey Arena) (Selects' game)

== See also ==
- NHL Global Series
- 2011 NHL Premiere
- Super Series
- Summit Series
- Rendez-vous '87
- Victoria Cup
- List of KHL vs NHL games
