= Super Series =

Series of ice hockey exhibition games between Soviet and NHL teams

- Status: inactive
- Genre: sports event
- Date: winter
- Frequency: annual
- Location: various
- Inaugurated: 1976
- Most recent: 1991
- Organiser: NHL

The Super Series were exhibition games between Soviet teams and NHL teams that took place on the NHL opponents' home ice in North America from 1976 to 1991. The Soviet teams were usually club teams from the Soviet hockey league. The exception was in 1983, when the Soviet National Team represented the Soviet Union. A total of 18 series were held; the Soviet teams won 14 and the NHL won 2, with the remaining two series tied. 98 games were played across the 18 series, with Soviet teams posting an overall record of 55–33–10.

== Summary of results ==
=== Soviet and NHL overall record by series and games ===
Soviet team	Total series played with NHL	Series won by Soviet team	Series won by NHL teams	Series tied	Series win percentage for Soviets	Games played	Games won by Soviet team	Games won by NHL teams	Games tied	Game win percentage for Soviets
CSKA Moscow (Red Army)	6	6	0	0	1.000	34	24	8	2	0.735
Dynamo Moscow	4	4	0	0	1.000	20	10	6	4	0.600
Krylya Sovetov (Soviet Wings)	3	2	1	0	0.667	13	6	5	2	0.538
Spartak Moscow	1	1	0	0	1.000	5	3	2	0	0.600
USSR (National team)	1	1	0	0	1.000	6	4	2	0	0.667
Khimik Voskresensk	2	0	0	2	0.500	13	6	6	1	0.500
Dinamo Riga	1	0	1	0	0.000	7	2	4	1	0.357
Totals	18	14	2	2	0.833	98	55	33	10	0.612

=== Records between individual Soviet and NHL teams ===
NHL team	Soviet team														Totals	
NHL team	Red Army		Dynamo Moscow		Soviet Wings		Spartak		USSR		Khimik		Riga		Totals	
NHL team	GP	PCT	GP	PCT	GP	PCT	GP	PCT	GP	PCT	GP	PCT	GP	PCT	GP	PCT
New York Rangers	3	0.000			1	0.000									4	0.000
Montreal Canadiens	3	0.500			1	1.000	1	1.000	1	0.000	1	0.000			7	0.500
Boston Bruins	2	0.000	2	0.000	1	0.000					1	0.000			6	0.000
Philadelphia Flyers	2	0.500	1	0.000	1	0.500			1	0.000					5	0.300
Pittsburgh Penguins	1	1.000	3	0.167	1	0.000									5	0.300
Buffalo Sabres	2	1.000	2	0.500	1	1.000					1	0.000			6	0.667
Chicago Blackhawks	2	0.000			1	0.000							1	1.000	4	0.250
New York Islanders	2	0.000			2	0.500					1	0.500			5	0.300
Vancouver Canucks	2	0.000	1	1.000			1	1.000					1	1.000	5	0.600
Colorado Rockies / New Jersey Devils	1	0.000	2	0.750			1	0.000							4	0.375
St. Louis Blues	1	0.000					1	0.000			2	0.500	1	1.000	5	0.400
Atlanta / Calgary Flames	1	0.000	1	1.000			1	0.000	1	1.000	1	1.000	1	0.500	6	0.583
Minnesota North Stars	2	0.000			1	0.000			1	0.000	1	1.000	1	0.000	6	0.167
Detroit Red Wings	1	0.000			1	1.000					1	0.000			3	0.333
Winnipeg Jets	2	0.500	1	0.000											3	0.333
Edmonton Oilers	2	0.500	1	0.000					1	1.000	1	1.000	1	1.000	6	0.667
Washington Capitals			2	0.750							1	1.000	1	1.000	4	0.875
Quebec Nordiques	3	0.500	1	0.000	1	0.500			1	0.000					6	0.333
Los Angeles Kings	1	0.000									2	0.500	1	0.000	4	0.250
Hartford Whalers	1	0.000	1	0.500	1	1.000									3	0.500
Toronto Maple Leafs			2	0.500											2	0.500
Totals	34	0.265	20	0.400	13	0.462	5	0.400	6	0.333	13	0.500	7	0.643	98	0.388

- GP: games played between NHL and Soviet Team
- PCT: winning percentage of NHL team versus Soviet Team

== Super Series 1976 ==
=== Moscow Central Red Army versus the NHL ===
The Red Army won a series against NHL teams, with 2 wins, 1 tie, 1 loss. The scores were:

- 1975-12-28 Red Army beat New York Rangers 7 to 3
- 1975-12-31 Red Army tied Montreal Canadiens 3 to 3
- 1976-01-08 Red Army beat Boston Bruins 5 to 2
- 1976-01-11 Philadelphia Flyers beat Red Army 4 to 1

Team	1	2	3	F
Flyers	2	1	1	4
CSKA	0	1	0	1
W: Stephenson
Philadelphia: Goodenaugh (1), Bill Barber, Dornhoefer, 14.Joe Watson (1), 16.Bobby Clarke, 18.Lonsberry, 19.MacLeish (1), 26.Kindrachuk, 27.Reggie Leach (1), CSKA: Kutergin (1)

=== Soviet Wings versus the NHL ===
The Wings won a series against NHL teams with 3 wins, 0 ties, 1 loss. The scores were:

- 1975-12-29 Soviet Wings beat Pittsburgh Penguins 7 to 4
- 1976-01-04 Buffalo Sabres beat Soviet Wings 12 to 6
- 1976-01-07 Soviet Wings beat Chicago Blackhawks 4 to 2
- 1976-01-10 Soviet Wings beat New York Islanders 2 to 1

== Super Series 1978 ==
=== Spartak Moscow versus the NHL ===
Spartak won a series against NHL teams with 3 wins, 0 ties, 2 losses. The scores were:

- Vancouver Canucks beat Spartak 2 to 0
- Spartak beat Colorado Rockies 8 to 3
- Spartak beat St. Louis Blues 2 to 1
- Montreal Canadiens beat Spartak 5 to 2
- Spartak beat Atlanta Flames 2 to 1

== Super Series 1979 ==
=== Soviet Wings versus the NHL ===
Soviet Wings won a series against NHL teams with 2 wins, 1 tie, 1 loss. The scores were:

- Soviet Wings beat Minnesota North Stars 8 to 5
- Soviet Wings tied Philadelphia Flyers 4 to 4
- Detroit Red Wings beat Soviet Wings 6 to 5
- Soviet Wings beat Boston Bruins 4 to 1

== Super Series 1980 ==
=== Dynamo Moscow versus NHL ===
Dynamo Moscow won a series against NHL team with 2 wins, 1 tie, and 1 loss. The scores were:

- Vancouver Canucks beat Dynamo Moscow 6 to 2
- Dynamo Moscow beat Winnipeg Jets 7 to 0
- Dynamo Moscow beat Edmonton Oilers 4 to 1
- Dynamo Moscow tied Washington Capitals, 5 to 5.

=== Moscow Central Red Army versus the NHL ===
Red Army won a series against NHL teams with 3 wins, 0 ties, and 2 losses. The scores were:

- Red Army beat New York Rangers 5 to 2
- Red Army beat New York Islanders 3 to 2
- Montreal Canadiens beat Red Army 4 to 2
- Buffalo Sabres beat Red Army 6 to 1
- Red Army beat Quebec Nordiques 6 to 4

== Super Series 1983 ==
Soviet journalist Vsevolod Kukushkin reported in his 2016 book The Red Machine, that the nickname for the Soviet national team came into usage during the 1983 series, when a headline in a Minneapolis newspaper read "The Red Machine rolled down on us".

=== Soviet national team versus NHL ===
The USSR won a series against NHL teams with 4 wins, 0 ties, and 2 losses. The scores were:

- Edmonton Oilers beat USSR 4 to 3
- USSR beat Quebec Nordiques 3 to 0
- USSR beat Montreal Canadiens 5 to 0
- Calgary Flames beat USSR 3 to 2
- USSR beat Minnesota North Stars 6 to 3
- USSR beat Philadelphia Flyers 5 to 1

== Super Series 1986 ==
=== Moscow Central Red Army versus the NHL ===
Red Army won a series against NHL teams with 5 wins, 0 ties, and 1 loss. The scores were:

- Red Army beat Los Angeles Kings 5 to 2
- Red Army beat Edmonton Oilers 6 to 3
- Quebec Nordiques beat Red Army 5 to 1
- Red Army beat Montreal Canadiens 6 to 1
- Red Army beat St. Louis Blues 4 to 2
- Red Army beat Minnesota North Stars 4 to 3

=== Dynamo Moscow versus NHL ===
Dynamo Moscow won a series against NHL teams with 2 wins, 1 tie, and 1 loss. The scores were:

- Calgary Flames beat Dynamo Moscow 4 to 3 (OT)
- Dynamo Moscow tied Pittsburgh Penguins 3 to 3
- Dynamo Moscow beat Boston Bruins 6 to 4
- Dynamo Moscow beat Buffalo Sabres 7 to 4

== Super Series 1989 ==
=== Moscow Central Red Army versus the NHL ===
Red Army won a series against NHL teams with 4 wins, 1 tie, and 2 losses. The scores were:

- Red Army tied the Quebec Nordiques 5 to 5
- Red Army beat the New York Islanders 3 to 2
- Red Army beat the Boston Bruins 5 to 4
- Red Army beat the New Jersey Devils 5 to 0
- Pittsburgh Penguins beat the Red Army 4 to 2
- Red Army beat the Hartford Whalers 6 to 3
- Buffalo Sabres beat the Red Army 6 to 5

=== Dynamo Riga versus NHL ===
The NHL teams won a series against Dynamo Riga with 5 wins, 1 tie, 2 losses. The scores were:

- Dynamo Riga tied the Calgary Flames 2 to 2 (Perry Berezan, Hakan Loob) (Alexander Kerch, Alexander Belyavsky)
- Edmonton Oilers beat Dynamo Riga 2 to 1
- Vancouver Canucks beat Dynamo Riga 6 to 1
- Dynamo Riga beat Los Angeles Kings 5 to 3
- Chicago Blackhawks beat Dynamo Riga 4 to 1
- St. Louis Blues beat Dynamo Riga 5 to 0
- Dynamo Riga beat Minnesota North Stars 2 to 1
- Washington Capitals beat Dynamo Riga 2 to 1 (19 September 1989 in Riga)

== Super Series 1990 ==
=== Khimik Voskresensk versus the NHL ===
Khimik Voskresensk tied a series against NHL teams with 3 wins, 0 ties, 3 losses. The scores were:

- Khimik Voskresensk beat Los Angeles Kings 6 to 3
- Edmonton Oilers beat Khimik Voskresensk 6 to 2
- Calgary Flames beat Khimik Voskresensk 6 to 3
- Khimik Voskresensk beat Detroit Red Wings 4 to 2
- Washington Capitals beat Khimik Voskresensk 5 to 2
- Khimik Voskresensk beat St. Louis Blues 6 to 3

=== Soviet Wings versus the NHL ===
The NHL teams won a series against Soviet Wings with 3 wins, 1 tie, 1 loss. The scores were:

- New York Islanders beat Soviet Wings 5 to 4
- Hartford Whalers beat Soviet Wings 4 to 3
- Soviet Wings tied Quebec Nordiques 4 to 4
- Soviet Wings beat New York Rangers 3 to 1
- Montreal Canadiens beat Soviet Wings 2 to 1

=== Moscow Central Red Army versus the NHL ===
Red Army won a series against NHL teams with 4 wins, 0 ties, 1 loss. The scores were:

- Winnipeg Jets beat Red Army 4 to 1
- Red Army beat Vancouver Canucks 6 to 0
- Red Army beat Minnesota North Stars 4 to 2
- Red Army beat Chicago Blackhawks 6 to 4
- Red Army beat Philadelphia Flyers 5 to 4

=== Dynamo Moscow versus NHL ===
Dynamo Moscow won a series against NHL team, with 3 wins, 0 ties, and 2 losses. The scores were:

- Dynamo Moscow beat Pittsburgh Penguins 5 to 2
- Dynamo Moscow beat Toronto Maple Leafs 7 to 4
- Buffalo Sabres beat Dynamo Moscow 4 to 2
- New Jersey Devils beat Dynamo Moscow 7 to 1
- Dynamo Moscow beat Boston Bruins 3 to 1

== Super Series 1991 ==
=== Khimik Voskresensk versus the NHL ===
Khimik Voskresensk tied a series against NHL teams with 3 wins, 1 tie, 3 losses. The scores were:

- Los Angeles Kings beat Khimik Voskresensk 5 to 1
- St. Louis Blues beat Khimik Voskresensk 4 to 2
- Khimik Voskresensk tied New York Islanders 2 to 2
- Khimik Voskresensk beat Montreal Canadiens 6 to 3
- Khimik Voskresensk beat Buffalo Sabres 5 to 4
- Khimik Voskresensk beat Boston Bruins 5 to 2
- Minnesota North Stars beat Khimik Voskresensk 6 to 4

=== Moscow Central Red Army versus the NHL ===
The Red Army won a series against NHL teams with 6 wins, 0 ties, 1 loss. The scores were:

- Red Army beat Detroit Red Wings 5 to 2
- Red Army beat New York Rangers 6 to 1
- Red Army beat Chicago Blackhawks 4 to 2
- Red Army beat Calgary Flames 6 to 4

Team	1	2	3	F
CSKA	2	1	3	6
Calgary	2	1	1	4
W: 20.Mihaylovski
CSKA: 2.Mironov, 3.Zubov, 4.Kravchuk, 6.Biakin, 8.Nemchinov, 9.Maslenikov (2), 11.Davidov, 13.Kaminsky (1), 15.Prokopiev, 16.Konstantinov (1), 18.Vostrikov, 19.Khmylev (2), 21.Stelnov, 22.Brezgunov, 24.Gordiyuk, 25.Butsayev, 26.Kovalenko, 27.Kostichkin, 29.Chibirev, Calgary: Sweeney(2), Fleury(1), Gilmour(1)

- Edmonton Oilers beat Red Army 4 to 2

Team	1	2	3	F
Edmonton Oilers	1	2	1	4
CSKA	0	0	2	2
W: Takko
Edmonton Oilers: 2.Joseph, 4.Lowe (1), 6.Beukeboom, 7.Lamb, 8.Murphy (1), 9.Anderson (1), 10.Tikkanen, 12.Graves, 14.MacTavish, 16.Buchberger, 18.Simpson (1), 19.Semenov, 20.Gelinas, 28.Muni, 29.Vyazmikin, 85.Klima, CSKA: Malahov(1), Biakin(1),

- Red Army beat Winnipeg Jets 6 to 4
- Red Army beat Vancouver Canucks 4 to 3 (OT)

=== Dynamo Moscow versus NHL ===
Dynamo Moscow won a series against NHL teams with 3 wins, 2 ties, 2 losses. The scores were:

- Toronto Maple Leafs beat Dynamo Moscow 7 to 4
- Dynamo Moscow tied Hartford Whalers 0 to 0
- Dynamo Moscow tied New Jersey Devils 2 to 2
- Washington Capitals beat Dynamo Moscow 3 to 2
- Dynamo Moscow beat Philadelphia Flyers 4 to 1 (Yuri Leonov-2, Igor Dorofeyev, Alexandr Galchenyuk)(Rick Tocchet)
- Dynamo Moscow beat Pittsburgh Penguins 4 to 3 (Alexei Zhamnov, Ravil Yakubov, Alexander Semak, Andrei Lomakin)(Errey, Jiri Hrdina, S. Young)
- Dynamo Moscow beat Quebec Nordiques 4 to 1 (Igor Dorofeyev-2, Kovalev, Ravil Khaydarov)(Pearson)

== See also ==
- Super Series '76-77
- Rendez-vous '87
- NHL Challenge
- 2007 Super Series
- List of international ice hockey competitions featuring NHL players
- Victoria Cup
- List of KHL vs NHL games
- Aggie Kukulowicz, Canadian-born Russian language interpreter for the series
