= 2012–13 NHL season =

National Hockey League season

- League: National Hockey League
- Sport: Ice hockey
- Duration: January 19 – June 24, 2013
- Games: 48
- Teams: 30
- TV partner(s): CBC, TSN, RDS (Canada); NBCSN, NBC, CNBC (United States)

Draft
- Top draft pick: Nail Yakupov
- Picked by: Edmonton Oilers

Regular season
- Presidents' Trophy: Chicago Blackhawks
- Season MVP: Alexander Ovechkin (Capitals)
- Top scorer: Martin St. Louis (Lightning)

Playoffs
- Playoffs MVP: Patrick Kane (Blackhawks)

Stanley Cup
- Champions: Chicago Blackhawks
- Runners-up: Boston Bruins

NHL seasons
- 2011–12 2013–14

The 2012–13 NHL season was the 96th season of operation (95th season of play) of the National Hockey League (NHL). The regular season began on January 19, 2013, and ended on April 28, 2013, with the playoffs to follow until June. The Chicago Blackhawks defeated the Boston Bruins in six games to win the Stanley Cup.

The season start was delayed from its original October 11, 2012, date due to a lockout imposed by the NHL franchise owners after the expiration of the league's collective bargaining agreement (CBA). After a new labour agreement was reached between the owners and the National Hockey League Players' Association (NHLPA), training camps opened on January 13, 2013, and a 48-game season (reduced from 82 games) started on January 19. Similar to the 1994–95 season, the shortened regular season was limited to intra-conference competition.

== League business ==
=== Entry draft ===
The 2012 NHL entry draft was held on June 22–23, 2012, at the Consol Energy Center in Pittsburgh. Nail Yakupov was selected first overall by the Edmonton Oilers.

=== Lockout ===
On September 13, 2012, all 29 league ownership groups (with the Phoenix Coyotes collectively owned by the NHL) authorized commissioner Gary Bettman to lock out the National Hockey League Players' Association (NHLPA) upon the expiration of the NHL collective bargaining agreement (CBA) on September 15. The action marked the fifth labour dispute in twenty years for the league, following a 1992 strike, lockouts in 1994–95 and 2004–05, as well as a referees lockout in 1993; this is more than any of the other major professional sports leagues in the United States and Canada during this period. In preparation for the lockout, NHL teams assigned all of their eligible players to their American Hockey League farm clubs.

Although Bettman acknowledged the 2005–12 CBA was fair, he also stated that he was demanding concessions due to the Great Recession, even though the league experienced significant growth at that time. Sports media reported on July 14 on the NHL's first offer to the players. The offer reportedly included: a drop in players' share of "hockey-related revenues" from 57 per cent to 46 per cent; a requirement that players play ten years before becoming an unrestricted free agent (UFA); a limit on players' contracts to five years in length; elimination of salary arbitration; and an extension of entry-level contracts to five years from three.

The NHLPA made an attempt to strike down the lockout as illegal in Alberta and Quebec; the Quebec Labour Board ruled against the NHLPA on September 14.

The NHL season officially entered a lockout after the expiration of the CBA on September 15, 2012, prior to the planned start of the pre-season. Locked-out players immediately began signing with the Kontinental Hockey League (KHL), Czech Extraliga (ELH), the SM-liiga, and the Elitserien (SEL), the last of which largely resisted signing locked-out players. The NHL canceled all regular-season games originally scheduled up to January 14, 2013, including the 2013 NHL Winter Classic. The 2013 NHL All-Star Game was also canceled.

On January 6, 2013, after a 16-hour negotiating session, the owners and players union reached a tentative agreement for a 10-year deal. NHL owners ratified the CBA on January 9, 2013, followed three days later by the deal's ratification by NHLPA members, and the signing of a memorandum of understanding between the two parties, marking their official agreement on the labour pact. The NHL announced a 48-game schedule, starting on January 19, 2013, and ending on April 28, 2013, consisting solely of intra-conference competition.

=== Proposed realignment ===
The relocation of the Atlanta Thrashers from the American southeast to the Canadian prairies, where the franchise is now known as the Winnipeg Jets, in the summer of 2011 resulted in discussions within the league on how to realign the league's 30 teams. Following several months of speculation, the NHL's Board of Governors voted in favor of a radical realignment plan that would have reduced the six current divisions in two conferences into four conferences. The top four teams in each conference would then qualify for the 2013 Stanley Cup playoffs, while for the regular season, each team would face its non-conference opponents twice: once each at home and on the road. Conference opponents would face each other five or six times each. The plan was designed to better balance each grouping of teams by time zone, as well as to cut the costs of travel western teams face.

However, on January 6, 2012, the league announced that the National Hockey League Players' Association (NHLPA) had rejected the proposed realignment, delaying any future changes until at least 2013–14. NHLPA officers expressed a desire to see a draft schedule for the realignment, which the league had not completed.

=== Salary cap ===
The NHL announced the revised salary cap on June 28, 2012. The salary cap figure is in effect until the end of the current collective bargaining agreement (CBA) with the Player's Association. The salary cap for players' salaries rose $5.9 million (USD) to $70.2 million per franchise. The salary floor, the minimum which franchises must spend, rose to $54.2 million.

As part of the newly agreed upon CBA, the salary cap for teams will be $64.3 million per franchise, with a floor of $44 million.

=== Arenas ===
The Florida Panthers' home arena, BankAtlantic Center, was renamed BB&T Center in recognition of BB&T's purchase of BankAtlantic.

On October 24, 2012, the New York Islanders announced that the team had signed a 25-year lease with the Barclays Center in Brooklyn, starting in 2015 after the team's current lease for the Nassau Veterans Memorial Coliseum expires. The arena, originally constructed as the home for the National Basketball Association's Brooklyn Nets, was intended to be expanded to meet NHL standards.

=== Rule changes ===
With the ratification of the new collective bargaining agreement, several rule changes took effect this season.

- Officials no longer had to be certain that contact had been made with the hands (as opposed to the stick) in deciding whether or not to assess a slashing minor.
- Making contact with the opponent's facemask will result in a minor penalty.
- Both players facing-off are prohibited from batting the puck with their hand in an attempt to win the face-off. Any attempt by either center to win the face-off by batting the puck with their hand shall result in a minor penalty. This penalty shall be announced as a "Minor Penalty for Delay of Game - Face-off Violation."
- Rule 67 has been changed to prevent players from getting a faceoff by putting their glove on the puck anywhere on the ice and not allowing play to continue. A minor penalty will be assessed for "closing his hand on the puck."

=== Uniforms ===
- To celebrate 20 years in Dallas, the Stars wore special patches this season.
- The Tampa Bay Lightning wore special patches to commemorate their 20th season in the NHL. Their alternate uniform was also modified to include the simplified logo they introduced in the 2011–12 season.
- The San Jose Sharks wore patches in memory of original owner George Gund III, who died January 15, 2013. Gund was instrumental in bringing, removing and returning NHL hockey to the Bay Area.
- To celebrate 100 years of hockey on the west coast, the Canucks honored Vancouver's first professional hockey team, the Vancouver Millionaires, who played in the Pacific Coast Hockey Association and the Western Canada Hockey League from 1912 to 1926 by wearing a patch of a re-colored Millionaires logo on their alternate home jerseys. The Canucks also wore throwback uniforms based on the 1915 Vancouver Millionaires in a game against the Detroit Red Wings.
- The Buffalo Sabres, Edmonton Oilers and Florida Panthers retired their third jerseys.

== Regular season ==
Originally planned for October 11, 2012, the lockout delay pushed the start of the 2012–13 season to January 19, 2013, with 12 games for the opening night. Each team played 18 games within its division (four or five games for each team) and 30 games against teams in the other division (three games for each team); no interconference games were played during the regular season. The regular season was shortened from 82 games down to 48, canceling 41.5 percent of the full regular season.

=== Postponed Winter Classic and All-Star Game ===
Both this season's Winter Classic and All-Star Game were postponed due to the lockout. The Winter Classic was scheduled to feature the Detroit Red Wings hosting the Toronto Maple Leafs at Michigan Stadium (the largest stadium in North America) in Ann Arbor, Michigan, but it was postponed to 2014. The game was played instead on January 1, 2014, at Michigan Stadium. The All-Star Game was originally scheduled to take place January 27, 2013, at Nationwide Arena in Columbus, Ohio; the city would later be awarded the 2015 All-Star Game.

=== European Premiere games ===
In past seasons, selected NHL teams began their season with exhibition games and the first two regular season games in European cities. In March 2012, the NHL announced that it had decided not to start the season with games in Europe, because of the upcoming Collective Bargaining Agreement negotiations and the surrounding uncertainty.

With the NHL not playing games in Europe, Russia's Kontinental Hockey League (against which the NHL has played several interleague competitions) was instead to come to the United States, with the NHL's blessing; the KHL was to feature two games between Dynamo Moscow and SKA Saint Petersburg at the Barclays Center in Brooklyn on January 19 and 20, 2013. However no agreement between the KHL and the Barclays Center had been signed, and the KHL announced the two games would be held in Russia; due to the NHL lockout, the signing of a 25-year lease with the New York Islanders, and pleas from the teams' fans to keep the games in Russia.

=== Postponement ===
- The February 9 game between the Tampa Bay Lightning and Boston Bruins at TD Garden was postponed due to inclement weather in Boston the day of the game.

Two games were affected by the Boston Marathon bombing:

- The April 15 game between the Ottawa Senators and Boston Bruins at TD Garden was postponed due to the bombing earlier that day. The game was rescheduled to April 28, the day after the previous final day of the regular season.
- The April 19 game between the Pittsburgh Penguins and Boston Bruins at TD Garden was postponed to April 20 due to the citywide lockdown as a result of the manhunt for the suspects of the bombing. As a result of the rescheduled Penguins-Bruins game, the game between the Penguins and Buffalo Sabres that was originally scheduled for April 20 was moved to April 23.

== Standings ==
Due to the lockout, each team played 48 games this season, all within their conference.

Eastern Conference
| Pos | Div | Team | GP | W | L | OTL | ROW | GF | GA | GD | Pts |
|---|---|---|---|---|---|---|---|---|---|---|---|
| 1 | AT | z – Pittsburgh Penguins | 48 | 36 | 12 | 0 | 33 | 165 | 119 | +46 | 72 |
| 2 | NE | y – Montreal Canadiens | 48 | 29 | 14 | 5 | 26 | 149 | 126 | +23 | 63 |
| 3 | SE | y – Washington Capitals | 48 | 27 | 18 | 3 | 24 | 149 | 130 | +19 | 57 |
| 4 | NE | x – Boston Bruins | 48 | 28 | 14 | 6 | 24 | 131 | 109 | +22 | 62 |
| 5 | NE | x – Toronto Maple Leafs | 48 | 26 | 17 | 5 | 26 | 145 | 133 | +12 | 57 |
| 6 | AT | x – New York Rangers | 48 | 26 | 18 | 4 | 22 | 130 | 112 | +18 | 56 |
| 7 | NE | x – Ottawa Senators | 48 | 25 | 17 | 6 | 21 | 116 | 104 | +12 | 56 |
| 8 | AT | x – New York Islanders | 48 | 24 | 17 | 7 | 20 | 139 | 139 | 0 | 55 |
| 9 | SE | Winnipeg Jets | 48 | 24 | 21 | 3 | 22 | 128 | 144 | −16 | 51 |
| 10 | AT | Philadelphia Flyers | 48 | 23 | 22 | 3 | 22 | 133 | 141 | −8 | 49 |
| 11 | AT | New Jersey Devils | 48 | 19 | 19 | 10 | 17 | 112 | 129 | −17 | 48 |
| 12 | NE | Buffalo Sabres | 48 | 21 | 21 | 6 | 14 | 115 | 143 | −28 | 48 |
| 13 | SE | Carolina Hurricanes | 48 | 19 | 25 | 4 | 18 | 128 | 160 | −32 | 42 |
| 14 | SE | Tampa Bay Lightning | 48 | 18 | 26 | 4 | 17 | 148 | 150 | −2 | 40 |
| 15 | SE | Florida Panthers | 48 | 15 | 27 | 6 | 12 | 112 | 171 | −59 | 36 |

Source: National Hockey League
x – Clinched playoff spot; y – Clinched division; z – Clinched conference

Western Conference
| Pos | Div | Team | GP | W | L | OTL | ROW | GF | GA | GD | Pts |
|---|---|---|---|---|---|---|---|---|---|---|---|
| 1 | CE | p – Chicago Blackhawks | 48 | 36 | 7 | 5 | 30 | 155 | 102 | +53 | 77 |
| 2 | PA | y – Anaheim Ducks | 48 | 30 | 12 | 6 | 24 | 140 | 118 | +22 | 66 |
| 3 | NW | y – Vancouver Canucks | 48 | 26 | 15 | 7 | 21 | 127 | 121 | +6 | 59 |
| 4 | CE | x – St. Louis Blues | 48 | 29 | 17 | 2 | 24 | 129 | 115 | +14 | 60 |
| 5 | PA | x – Los Angeles Kings | 48 | 27 | 16 | 5 | 25 | 133 | 118 | +15 | 59 |
| 6 | PA | x – San Jose Sharks | 48 | 25 | 16 | 7 | 17 | 124 | 116 | +8 | 57 |
| 7 | CE | x – Detroit Red Wings | 48 | 24 | 16 | 8 | 22 | 124 | 115 | +9 | 56 |
| 8 | NW | x – Minnesota Wild | 48 | 26 | 19 | 3 | 22 | 122 | 127 | −5 | 55 |
| 9 | CE | Columbus Blue Jackets | 48 | 24 | 17 | 7 | 19 | 120 | 119 | +1 | 55 |
| 10 | PA | Phoenix Coyotes | 48 | 21 | 18 | 9 | 17 | 125 | 131 | −6 | 51 |
| 11 | PA | Dallas Stars | 48 | 22 | 22 | 4 | 20 | 130 | 142 | −12 | 48 |
| 12 | NW | Edmonton Oilers | 48 | 19 | 22 | 7 | 17 | 125 | 134 | −9 | 45 |
| 13 | NW | Calgary Flames | 48 | 19 | 25 | 4 | 19 | 128 | 160 | −32 | 42 |
| 14 | CE | Nashville Predators | 48 | 16 | 23 | 9 | 14 | 111 | 139 | −28 | 41 |
| 15 | NW | Colorado Avalanche | 48 | 16 | 25 | 7 | 14 | 116 | 152 | −36 | 39 |

Source: National Hockey League
p – Clinched Presidents' Trophy; x – Clinched playoff spot; y – Clinched division

== Playoffs ==
Because of the lockout and delayed start of the shortened regular season, the playoffs did not begin until April 30. The last possible date of Game 7 of the Stanley Cup Final was then scheduled for June 28.

In each round, teams competed in a best-of-seven series following a 2–2–1–1–1 format (scores in the bracket indicate the number of games won in each best-of-seven series). The team with home ice advantage played at home for games one and two (and games five and seven, if necessary), and the other team played at home for games three and four (and game six, if necessary). The top eight teams in each conference made the playoffs, with the three division winners seeded 1–3 based on regular season record, and the five remaining teams seeded 4–8.

The NHL used "re-seeding" instead of a fixed bracket playoff system. During the first three rounds, the highest remaining seed in each conference was matched against the lowest remaining seed, the second-highest remaining seed played the second-lowest remaining seed, and so forth. The higher-seeded team was awarded home ice advantage. The two conference winners then advanced to the Stanley Cup Final, where home ice advantage was awarded to the team that had the better regular season record.

Conference quarterfinals | Conference semifinals
1 | Pittsburgh | 4
8 | NY Islanders | 2
1 | Pittsburgh | 4
7 | Ottawa | 1
2 | Montreal | 1
7 | Ottawa | 4
Eastern Conference
3 | Washington | 3
6 | NY Rangers | 4
4 | Boston | 4
6 | NY Rangers | 1
4 | Boston | 4
5 | Toronto | 3
1 | Chicago | 4
8 | Minnesota | 1
1 | Chicago | 4
7 | Detroit | 3
2 | Anaheim | 3
7 | Detroit | 4
Western Conference
3 | Vancouver | 0
6 | San Jose | 4
5 | Los Angeles | 4
6 | San Jose | 3
4 | St. Louis | 2
5 | Los Angeles | 4

Conference finals
1 | Pittsburgh | 0
4 | Boston | 4
1 | Chicago | 4
5 | Los Angeles | 1

Stanley Cup Final
E4 | Boston | 2
W1 | Chicago | 4

== NHL awards ==
Awards were presented during the NHL Awards television specials on June 14–15, 2013. Finalists for voted awards are announced during the playoffs and winners are presented at the awards specials. Voting concluded immediately after the end of the regular season. The President's Trophy, the Prince of Wales Trophy and Campbell Bowls are not presented at the awards specials. NHL Network U.S. and NHL Network Canada aired the first part of the awards presentation on June 14, while NBC Sports Network and CBC aired the second part on June 15 preceding game 2 of the 2013 Stanley Cup Final.

2012–13 NHL awards
| Award | Recipient(s) | Runner(s)-up |
|---|---|---|
| Presidents' Trophy (Best regular-season record) | Chicago Blackhawks | Pittsburgh Penguins |
| Prince of Wales Trophy (Eastern Conference playoff champion) | Boston Bruins | Pittsburgh Penguins |
| Clarence S. Campbell Bowl (Western Conference playoff champion) | Chicago Blackhawks | Los Angeles Kings |
| Art Ross Trophy (Top scorer) | Martin St. Louis (Tampa Bay Lightning) | Steven Stamkos (Tampa Bay Lightning) |
| Bill Masterton Memorial Trophy (Perseverance, Sportsmanship, and Dedication) | Josh Harding (Minnesota Wild) | Sidney Crosby (Pittsburgh Penguins); Adam McQuaid (Boston Bruins) |
| Calder Memorial Trophy (Best first-year player) | Jonathan Huberdeau (Florida Panthers) | Brendan Gallagher (Montreal Canadiens); Brandon Saad (Chicago Blackhawks) |
| Conn Smythe Trophy (Most valuable player, playoffs) | Patrick Kane (Chicago Blackhawks) | |
| Frank J. Selke Trophy (Defensive forward) | Jonathan Toews (Chicago Blackhawks) | Patrice Bergeron (Boston Bruins); Pavel Datsyuk (Detroit Red Wings) |
| Hart Memorial Trophy (Most valuable player, regular season) | Alexander Ovechkin (Washington Capitals) | Sidney Crosby (Pittsburgh Penguins); John Tavares (New York Islanders) |
| Jack Adams Award (Best coach) | Paul MacLean (Ottawa Senators) | Bruce Boudreau (Anaheim Ducks); Joel Quenneville (Chicago Blackhawks) |
| James Norris Memorial Trophy (Best defenceman) | P. K. Subban (Montreal Canadiens) | Kris Letang (Pittsburgh Penguins); Ryan Suter (Minnesota Wild) |
| King Clancy Memorial Trophy (Leadership and humanitarian contribution) | Patrice Bergeron (Boston Bruins) | |
| Lady Byng Memorial Trophy (Sportsmanship and excellence) | Martin St. Louis (Tampa Bay Lightning) | Patrick Kane (Chicago Blackhawks); Matt Moulson (New York Islanders) |
| Ted Lindsay Award (Outstanding player) | Sidney Crosby (Pittsburgh Penguins) | Alexander Ovechkin (Washington Capitals); Martin St. Louis (Tampa Bay Lightning) |
| Mark Messier Leadership Award (Leadership and community activities) | Daniel Alfredsson (Ottawa Senators) | Dustin Brown (Los Angeles Kings); Jonathan Toews (Chicago Blackhawks) |
| Maurice "Rocket" Richard Trophy (Top goal-scorer) | Alexander Ovechkin (Washington Capitals) | Steven Stamkos (Tampa Bay Lightning) |
| NHL Foundation Player Award (Award for community enrichment) | Henrik Zetterberg (Detroit Red Wings) | |
| NHL General Manager of the Year Award (Top general manager) | Ray Shero (Pittsburgh Penguins) | Marc Bergevin (Montreal Canadiens); Bob Murray (Anaheim Ducks) |
| Vezina Trophy (Best goaltender) | Sergei Bobrovsky (Columbus Blue Jackets) | Henrik Lundqvist (New York Rangers); Antti Niemi (San Jose Sharks) |
| William M. Jennings Trophy (Goaltender(s) of team with fewest goals against) | Corey Crawford and Ray Emery (Chicago Blackhawks) | |

=== All-Star teams ===
| Position | First Team | Second Team | Position | All-Rookie |
|---|---|---|---|---|
| G | Sergei Bobrovsky, Columbus Blue Jackets | Henrik Lundqvist, New York Rangers | G | Jake Allen, St. Louis Blues |
| D | P. K. Subban, Montreal Canadiens | Francois Beauchemin, Anaheim Ducks | D | Jonas Brodin, Minnesota Wild |
| D | Ryan Suter, Minnesota Wild | Kris Letang, Pittsburgh Penguins | D | Justin Schultz, Edmonton Oilers |
| C | Sidney Crosby, Pittsburgh Penguins | Jonathan Toews, Chicago Blackhawks | F | Jonathan Huberdeau, Florida Panthers |
| RW | Alexander Ovechkin, Washington Capitals | Martin St. Louis, Tampa Bay Lightning | F | Brendan Gallagher, Montreal Canadiens |
| LW | Chris Kunitz, Pittsburgh Penguins | Alexander Ovechkin, Washington Capitals | F | Brandon Saad, Chicago Blackhawks |

Note: Alexander Ovechkin was listed as a Left Wing but played the majority of his games at Right Wing. Some members of the Professional Hockey Writers Association voted for him at Left Wing while others voted for him at Right Wing and consequently, Ovechkin placed twice on the NHL All-Star team.

== Player statistics ==
=== Scoring leaders ===
The following players lead the league in points following the conclusion of the regular season.

GP = Games played; G = Goals; A = Assists; Pts = Points; +/– = P Plus–minus; PIM = Penalty minutes

| Player | Team | GP | G | A | Pts | +/– | PIM |
|---|---|---|---|---|---|---|---|
| Martin St. Louis | Tampa Bay Lightning | 48 | 17 | 43 | 60 | 0 | 14 |
| Steven Stamkos | Tampa Bay Lightning | 48 | 29 | 28 | 57 | –4 | 32 |
| Alexander Ovechkin | Washington Capitals | 48 | 32 | 24 | 56 | +2 | 36 |
| Sidney Crosby | Pittsburgh Penguins | 36 | 15 | 41 | 56 | +26 | 16 |
| Patrick Kane | Chicago Blackhawks | 47 | 23 | 32 | 55 | +11 | 8 |
| Eric Staal | Carolina Hurricanes | 48 | 18 | 35 | 53 | +5 | 54 |
| Chris Kunitz | Pittsburgh Penguins | 48 | 22 | 30 | 52 | +30 | 39 |
| Phil Kessel | Toronto Maple Leafs | 48 | 20 | 32 | 52 | –3 | 18 |
| Taylor Hall | Edmonton Oilers | 45 | 16 | 34 | 50 | +5 | 33 |
| Ryan Getzlaf | Anaheim Ducks | 44 | 15 | 34 | 49 | +14 | 41 |
| Pavel Datsyuk | Detroit Red Wings | 47 | 15 | 34 | 49 | +21 | 14 |

=== Leading goaltenders ===
The following goaltenders lead the league in goals against average following the conclusion of the regular season while playing at least 1200 minutes.

GP = Games played; Min = Minutes played; W = Wins; L = Losses; OT = Overtime/shootout losses; GA = Goals against; SO = Shutouts; SV% = Save percentage; GAA = Goals against average

| Player | Team | GP | Min | W | L | OT | GA | SO | SV% | GAA |
|---|---|---|---|---|---|---|---|---|---|---|
| Craig Anderson | Ottawa Senators | 24 | 1420:36 | 12 | 9 | 2 | 40 | 3 | .941 | 1.69 |
| Corey Crawford | Chicago Blackhawks | 30 | 1760:31 | 19 | 5 | 5 | 57 | 3 | .926 | 1.94 |
| Sergei Bobrovsky | Columbus Blue Jackets | 38 | 2218:57 | 21 | 11 | 6 | 74 | 4 | .932 | 2.00 |
| Tuukka Rask | Boston Bruins | 36 | 2104:09 | 19 | 10 | 5 | 70 | 5 | .929 | 2.00 |
| Henrik Lundqvist | New York Rangers | 43 | 2575:22 | 24 | 16 | 3 | 88 | 2 | .926 | 2.05 |
| Cory Schneider | Vancouver Canucks | 30 | 1733:19 | 17 | 9 | 4 | 61 | 5 | .927 | 2.11 |
| Jimmy Howard | Detroit Red Wings | 42 | 2445:44 | 21 | 13 | 7 | 87 | 5 | .923 | 2.13 |
| Antti Niemi | San Jose Sharks | 43 | 2580:46 | 24 | 12 | 6 | 93 | 4 | .924 | 2.16 |
| Viktor Fasth | Anaheim Ducks | 25 | 1428:18 | 15 | 6 | 2 | 52 | 4 | .921 | 2.18 |
| Martin Brodeur | New Jersey Devils | 29 | 1757:21 | 13 | 9 | 7 | 65 | 2 | .901 | 2.22 |

== Coaching changes ==
=== Offseason ===
- Anaheim Ducks: This was Bruce Boudreau's first season as head coach, who replaced Randy Carlyle on November 30, 2011.
- Calgary Flames: The Flames decided not to renew Brent Sutter's contract and hired Bob Hartley instead.
- Carolina Hurricanes: This was Kirk Muller's first full season as head coach after replacing Paul Maurice, who was fired on November 28, 2011.
- Columbus Blue Jackets: This was Todd Richards's first full season as head coach after replacing Scott Arniel, who was fired on January 9, 2012.
- Edmonton Oilers: The Oilers decided not to renew Tom Renney's contract and hired Ralph Krueger instead.
- Los Angeles Kings: This was Darryl Sutter's first full season after becoming the team's head coach on December 20, 2011. On December 12, 2011, Terry Murray was fired and John Stevens served as interim until Sutter was hired.
- Montreal Canadiens: Michel Therrien started his second stint as the Canadiens head coach, after previously coaching the team from 2000 to 2003. The Habs fired Jacques Martin on December 17, 2011, and assistant coach Randy Cunneyworth served as interim head coach for the remainder of the 2011–12 season.
- St. Louis Blues: This was Ken Hitchcock's first season as head coach, who replaced Davis Payne on November 6, 2011.
- Toronto Maple Leafs: This was Randy Carlyle's first full season as head coach after replacing Ron Wilson, who was fired on March 2, 2012.
- Washington Capitals: This was Adam Oates's first season as head coach. Bruce Boudreau was fired on November 28, 2011, and replaced by interim Dale Hunter.

=== In-season ===
- Buffalo Sabres: Lindy Ruff was fired on February 20, 2013, and replaced by Ron Rolston.
- Tampa Bay Lightning: Guy Boucher was fired on March 24, 2013, and replaced by Jon Cooper.

== Milestones ==
=== First games ===
The following is a list of notable players who played their first NHL game in 2013, listed with their first team:

| Player | Team | Notability |
|---|---|---|
| Filip Forsberg | Nashville Predators | One-time NHL All-Star team |
| Dougie Hamilton | Boston Bruins | One-time NHL All-Star team |
| Jonathan Huberdeau | Florida Panthers | Winner of the 2012–13 Calder Memorial Trophy, two-time NHL All-Star team |
| Anders Lee | New York Islanders | King Clancy Memorial Trophy winner |
| Jonathan Marchessault | Columbus Blue Jackets | Conn Smythe Trophy winner |
| Vladimir Tarasenko | St. Louis Blues | Two-time NHL All-Star team |
| Nail Yakupov | Edmonton Oilers | First overall pick in the 2012 draft |
| Jason Zucker | Minnesota Wild | King Clancy Memorial Trophy winner |

=== Last games ===
The following is a list of players of note who played their last NHL game in 2012–13, listed with their team:

| Player | Team | Notability |
|---|---|---|
| Adrian Aucoin | Columbus Blue Jackets | Over 1,100 career games played |
| Roman Hamrlik | New York Rangers | First overall pick in the 1992 NHL entry draft, over 1,300 career games played |
| Milan Hejduk | Colorado Avalanche | Second team All-Star, Maurice "Rocket" Richard Trophy winner |
| Tomas Kaberle | Montreal Canadiens | Four-time NHL All-Star |
| Miikka Kiprusoff | Calgary Flames | First team All-Star, Vezina Trophy winner, William M. Jennings Trophy winner |
| Mike Knuble | Philadelphia Flyers | Over 1,000 career games played |
| Alexei Kovalev | Florida Panthers | NHL second All-Star team, over 1,300 career games played |
| Vinny Prospal | Columbus Blue Jackets | Over 1,100 career games played |
| Wade Redden | Boston Bruins | NHL Plus-Minus Award winner, over 1,000 career games played |
| Sheldon Souray | Anaheim Ducks | Three-time NHL All-Star |
| Steve Sullivan | New Jersey Devils | Bill Masterton Memorial Trophy winner, over 1,000 games played |
| Jose Theodore | Florida Panthers | Vezina Trophy winner; Hart Memorial Trophy winner; Bill Masterton Memorial Trophy winner |

=== Major milestones reached ===
- On January 21, 2013, Tampa Bay Lightning forward Vincent Lecavalier participated in his 1,000th NHL game.
- On February 4, 2013, Colorado Avalanche forward Milan Hejduk participated in his 1,000th NHL game.
- On February 7, 2013, St. Louis Blues defenceman Wade Redden participated in his 1,000th NHL game.
- On February 22, 2013, the Chicago Blackhawks set a record by earning at least one point in 17 consecutive games to start a season. The previous record of 16 consecutive games was held by the 2006–07 Anaheim Ducks. The Blackhawks went on to extend the record for consecutive games with a point to start a season to 24 games (21–0–3).
- On March 3, 2013, Chicago Blackhawks forward Marian Hossa participated in his 1,000th NHL game.
- On March 5, 2013, Montreal Canadiens captain Brian Gionta scored the team's 20,000th NHL goal.^{[note 1]}
- On March 6, 2013, Chicago Blackhawks goaltender Ray Emery becomes the first goaltender in league history to start a season with 10 straight wins. He extended it to 12 straight wins to start a season on March 26.
- On March 18, 2013, Philadelphia Flyers defenceman Kimmo Timonen participated in his 1,000th NHL game.
- On March 28, 2013, Phoenix Coyotes forward Steve Sullivan participated in his 1,000th NHL game.
- On March 29, 2013, Dallas Stars forward Jaromir Jagr recorded his 1,000th career assist, becoming the 12th player in league history and the first non-Canadian to do so.
- On March 30, 2013, the Pittsburgh Penguins set a record by becoming the first NHL franchise to win every game during a calendar month. The Penguins defeated the New York Islanders 2–0, winning 15 consecutive games from March 2 until March 30.
- On April 22, 2013, Pittsburgh Penguins goaltender Tomas Vokoun won his 300th NHL game. He became the 28th player in league history to reach this milestone.

== Broadcasting rights ==
This was the fifth season of the league's Canadian national broadcast rights deals with CBC and TSN. During the regular season, CBC continued to air Saturday night Hockey Night in Canada games while TSN aired games on Wednesdays and other selected weeknights. CBC and TSN then split the first three rounds of the playoffs, selecting the rights to individual series using a draft-like setup. The Stanley Cup Final aired exclusively on CBC.

This was the second season under the NHL's ten-year U.S. rights deal with NBC Sports, with regular season games on the NBC broadcast network and NBCSN. Playoff games then aired across NBC, NBCSN, and CNBC.

== Notes ==
1: Michael Cammalleri had previously scored the 20,000th goal in Canadiens' franchise history on December 28, 2009. Cammalleri's mark included goals from the Canadiens time in the National Hockey Association.
