= First indoor ice hockey game =

1875 ice hockey game in Montreal, Canada

Coordinates: 45.4980°N 73.5724°W

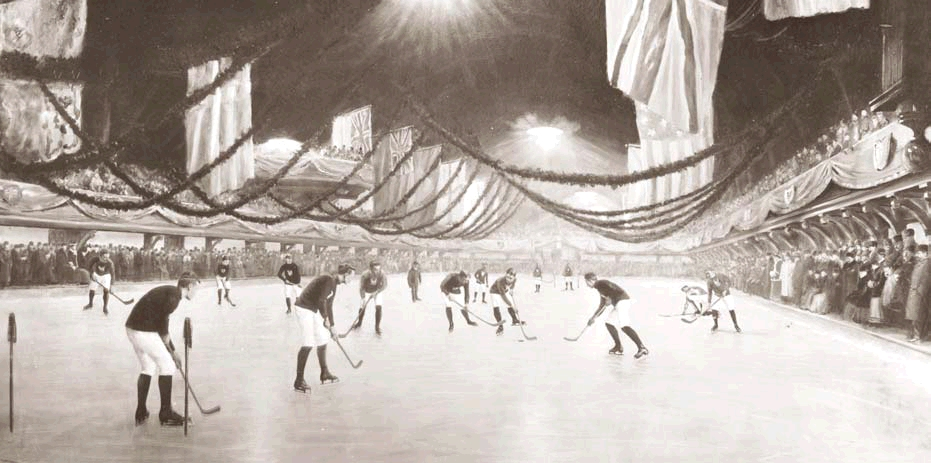
1893 ice hockey game at the same rink

On March 3, 1875 (151 years ago), the first recorded indoor ice hockey game took place at the Victoria Skating Rink in Montreal, Quebec. Organized by James Creighton, who captained one of the teams, the game was between two nine-member teams, using a rubber "puck". Members used skates and sticks used for outdoor hockey and shinny games in Nova Scotia, where Creighton was born and raised. It is recognized as the first organized ice hockey game.

== Victoria Rink ==
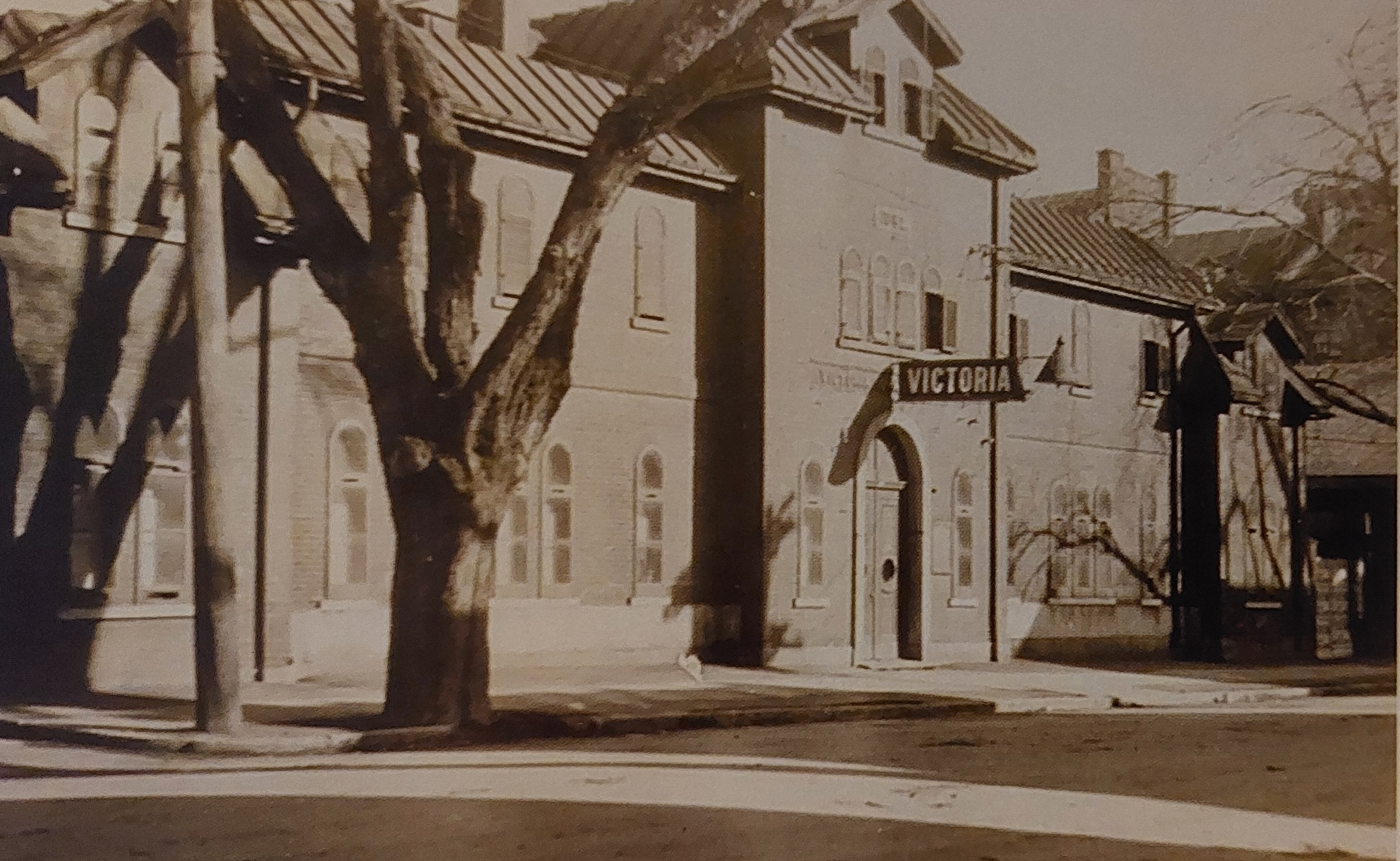
Exterior view of Victoria Skating Rink, 1862

The Victoria Skating Rink was a long (252 by 113 feet (77 m × 34 m)), two-story brick edifice with a 52-foot (16 m)-high pitched roof supported from within by curving wooden trusses, which arched over the entire width of the structure. Tall, round-arched windows punctuated its length and illuminated its interior, while evening skating was made possible by 500 gas-jet lighting fixtures set in coloured glass globes. At a later date, the lighting was converted to electric, making the building the first in Canada to be electrified.

The ice surface measured 204 by 80 feet (62 by 24 m), dimensions very similar to today's National Hockey League (NHL) ice rinks. It was surrounded by a 10-foot (3.0 m)-wide platform, or promenade, which was elevated approximately 1 foot (30 cm) above the ice surface and upon which spectators could stand or skaters could rest. Later, a gallery was added with a royal box for visiting dignitaries.

At the time of its construction, the rink's location at 49 Drummond Street (now renumbered to 1187) placed it in the centre of the English community in Montreal, in the vicinity of McGill University. The area is known today as the "Square Mile", the area of central Montreal populated then by rich English industrialists and the budding centre of commerce in Canada. One block east was Dominion Square, where annual outdoor winter sporting events and later the Montreal Winter Carnival were held. Across the street to the east, the Windsor Hotel, a long-time centre of social life and meeting place of several sports organizations, was built in 1875. Nearby is old Windsor Station, which was the eastern terminus of the Canadian Pacific Railway, built in 1889.

== Game ==
In 1873, James Creighton, a member of the Victoria Skating Club and a figure skating judge, started organizing sessions of shinny at the rink, played informally between members of the Club and friends. The rules used were developed from the informal rules of the outdoor game played in Nova Scotia where Creighton was born and raised, and adapted to the indoor setting and the rink's size.

=== First game ===
On March 3, 1875, the Rink hosted what has been recognized as the first organized ice hockey game, between members of the Victoria Skating Club, organized by Creighton. The match lays claim to this distinction because of factors which establish its link to modern ice hockey: it featured two teams (nine players per side) with a recorded score. Games prior to this had mostly been outdoors. In order to limit injuries to spectators and damage to glass windows, the game was played with a "flat block of wood" instead of a lacrosse ball. The two teams, members of the club, included a number of McGill University students. Sticks for this game were imported from Nova Scotia. This first game was pre-announced to the general public in the pages of The Montreal Gazette:

Announcement

Victoria Rink – A game of Hockey will be played at the Victoria Skating Rink this evening, between two nines chose from among the members. Good fun may be expected, as some of the players are reputed to be exceedingly expert at the game. Some fears have been expressed on the part of intending spectators that accidents were likely to occur through the ball flying about in too lively a manner, to the imminent danger of lookers on, but we understand that the game will be played with a flat circular piece of wood, thus preventing all danger of its leaving the surface of the ice. Subscribers will be admitted on presentation of their tickets.

Game report

HOCKEY – At the Rink last night a very large audience gathered to witness a novel contest on the ice. The game of hockey, though much in vogue on the ice in New England and other parts of the United States, is not much known here, and in consequence the game of last evening was looked forward to with great interest. Hockey is played usually with a ball, but last night, in order that no accident should happen, a flat block of wood was used, so that it should slide along the ice without rising, and thus going among the spectators to their discomfort. The game is like Lacrosse in one sense – the block having to go through flags placed about 8 feet apart in the same manner as the rubber ball – but in the main the old country game of shinty gives the best idea of hockey. The players last night were eighteen in number – nine on each side – and were as follows: – Messrs. Torrance (captain), Meagher, Potter, Goff, Barnston, Gardner, Griffin, Jarvis and Whiting. Creighton (captain), Campbell, Campbell, Esdaile, Joseph, Henshaw, Chapman, Powell and Clouston. The match was an interesting and well-contested affair, the efforts of the players exciting much merriment as they wheeled and dodged each other, and notwithstanding the brilliant play of Captain Torrance's team Captain Creighton's men carried the day, winning two games to the single of the Torrance nine. The game was concluded about half-past nine, and the spectators then adjourned well satisfied with the evening's entertainment.

The nine-man per side practice would last until 1880, when it was reduced during the Montreal Winter Carnival ice hockey tournaments.

=== After-game fight ===
Not reported in the Gazette, but reported elsewhere was that there was fighting after the game. This fighting was not between the on-ice combatants, rather, it was between the hockey players and spectators and members of the Skating Club. Members of the Skating Club were opposed to the use of the skating rink for hockey as it took away hours from other skating activities and it damaged the ice. According to the Kingston, Ontario, Daily British Whig "Shins and heads were battered, benches smashed and the lady spectators fled in confusion."

== IIHF recognition ==
In 2002, the International Ice Hockey Federation (IIHF) announced that it would acknowledge the site of Victoria Rink with "a commemorative plaque or other historical site marker to remind the passers-by of the existence of the Victoria Skating Rink, the birthplace of organized hockey." The commemoration has been marked in two ways. On May 22, 2008, a commemorative plaque was dedicated at the nearby Centre Bell, along with a plaque honouring James Creighton. Further, the IIHF created the Victoria Cup, a trophy named for the arena, for which—along with 1 million Swiss francs—one National Hockey League team and the champion of the European Champions Hockey League play-off annually. The first Cup match was held in Berne, Switzerland, on October 1, 2008, between the New York Rangers and Metallurg Magnitogorsk. The next, and last, edition of the Victoria Cup was held in Zürich on September 29, 2009, between the ZSC Lions and the Chicago Blackhawks.

== See also ==
- Amateur Hockey Association of Canada
- Matthews Arena
