= Victoria Cup (ice hockey) =

Series of ice hockey games

The Victoria Cup was a series of games played between professional ice hockey teams from Europe and the National Hockey League (NHL). The event was held twice, in 2008 and 2009.

== History ==
The Victoria Cup was announced in 2007 as one of the highlight events to celebrate 2008, the 100th anniversary of the International Ice Hockey Federation (IIHF). The Victoria Cup was named to commemorate the first recorded organised indoor ice hockey game, played in 1875 at the Victoria Skating Rink in Montreal, Quebec, Canada.

This is a milestone for international hockey and for the relationship between the IIHF and the National Hockey League," said IIHF President René Fasel. "Ever since the historic game between the Montreal Canadiens and CSKA Moscow on New Year's Eve 1975, hockey fans around the world have been longing for games between NHL clubs and European teams. There have been several games since then, but this is the first time we will have a summit meeting, a one-off final, for a trophy which we hope will be part of the annual international calendar for years to come.

— René Fasel, IIHF President

In the two editions of the event held, different criteria were used to choose the competing teams. One challenger, from Europe, was the winner of the IIHF European Champions Cup (in the 2009 edition) and then the Champions Hockey League (2009 edition). The other, from North America, was chosen by the NHL head office from among the teams that opened their NHL seasons with games in Europe. The IIHF publicly stated their wish to have the NHL champions (winners of the Stanley Cup) represent the NHL, but the NHL did not agree to that proposal, though the Chicago Blackhawks who challenged for the Victoria Cup in 2009 would go on to win the Stanley Cup during the 2009–10 season.

=== 2008 Victoria Cup ===
On October 1, 2008, the first Victoria Cup was awarded to the New York Rangers who won 4–3 against the Metallurg Magnitogorsk, winners of the 2008 European Champions Cup. The game was played under IIHF rules at the PostFinance Arena in Bern, Switzerland. Referees were split between the NHL and the IIHF.

The match was preceded by an exhibition game on September 30, 2008, between host SC Bern and the New York Rangers, which was won by the Rangers. It was the first time a Swiss club played against an NHL team. The Rangers followed the Victoria Cup game with two NHL regular season games against the Tampa Bay Lightning in Prague, Czech Republic, on October 4 and 5 at O2 Arena.

=== 2009 Victoria Cup ===
The second edition was contested by the ZSC Lions, champions of the Champions Hockey League, and the Chicago Blackhawks. The match was played on September 29, 2009 at the Hallenstadion in Zürich, Switzerland. ZSC Lions defeated the Blackhawks 2–1.

=== 2010–present ===
The Champions Hockey League was cancelled after the 2008–09 season with the IIHF originally announcing that the third edition of the Victoria Cup would feature an NHL team against a team from one of the top four European ice hockey leagues (KHL, SM-liiga, Czech Extraliga or Elitserien). However, the event was not held since the 2009 edition and has been suspended since the 2014 Russian invasion of Ukraine.

== Trophy ==
The IIHF commissioned a new trophy designed by GDE Bertoni, which designed the FIFA World Cup Trophy. The Victoria Cup is a gold cup with 12 Perspex – a thermoplastic material – light blue ice hockey sticks, six on each side, sitting on a marble case and forming a "V" coming up and out of the Cup. The names of the winning clubs are engraved on the back of the sticks.

== Results ==
Year	Winner	Score	Runner-up	Attendance	Venue
2008	(United States) New York Rangers	4–3	(Russia) Metallurg Magnitogorsk	13,794	PostFinance-Arena, Bern, Switzerland
2009	(Switzerland) ZSC Lions	2–1	(United States) Chicago Blackhawks	9,744	Hallenstadion, Zürich, Switzerland

== See also ==
- Super Series
- NHL Challenge
- List of international games played by NHL teams
- List of international ice hockey competitions featuring NHL players
- List of KHL vs NHL games
