= 2009 Victoria Cup =

Ice hockey championship

	1	2	3	Total
Chicago Blackhawks (NHL)	1	0	0	1
ZSC Lions (NLA)	1	1	0	2
- Date: September 29, 2009
- Arena: Hallenstadion
- City: Zurich, Switzerland
- Attendance: 9,744 (91.1% full)

The 2009 Victoria Cup was the second edition of the Victoria Cup challenge, played on September 29, 2009 between the 2008–09 Champions Hockey League winner ZSC Lions and the Chicago Blackhawks of the National Hockey League (NHL). The ZSC Lions won the game 2–1.

== ZSC Lions ==
The ZSC Lions qualified to play for the 2009 Victoria Cup by winning the 2008–09 Champions Hockey League competition. The ZSC Lions from Switzerland won the competition by beating Russia's Metallurg Magnitogorsk in the finals. Metallurg Magnitogorsk played in the inaugural 2008 Victoria Cup game.

== Chicago Blackhawks ==
The Chicago Blackhawks were named on May 10, 2009 to represent the NHL. The Blackhawks made it to the Western Conference Finals in 2009, eventually losing to the Detroit Red Wings. They would go on in the 2010 season to clinch the 2nd seed in the Western Conference and win the Stanley Cup for the first time since 1961. The Chicago Blackhawks were founded in 1926 and are one of the "Original Six" teams of the NHL. This was the Blackhawks' first game against a European club in Europe. The Blackhawks had played in Europe before, having played two exhibition games in 1992 in London, England against the NHL Montreal Canadiens. The Blackhawks played an exhibition game at Hallenstadion on September 28 against HC Davos, which they won 9 - 2.

== Game summary ==
=== Scoring summary ===
Period	Team	Goal	Assist(s)	Time	Score
1st	CHI	Cam Barker (1)	Patrick Sharp (1)	6:13	0–1 CHI
1st	ZSC	Patrik Bärtschi (1)	Thibaut Monnet (1), André Signoretti (1)	12:25	1–1 TIE
2nd	ZSC	Lukas Grauwiler (1)	Cyrill Bühler (1)	34:44	2–1 ZSC
3rd	No scoring				

=== Penalty summary ===
Period	Team	Player	Penalty	Time	PIM
1st	ZSC	Domenic Pittis	Interference	2:53	2:00
1st	ZSC	Domenic Pittis	Hooking	14:11	2:00
1st	CHI	Patrick Sharp	Boarding	15:17	2:00
2nd	ZSC	Blaine Down	Hooking	27:59	2:00
2nd	ZSC	Mathias Seger	Roughing	29:34	2:00
2nd	CHI	Dustin Byfuglien	Roughing	29:34	2:00
2nd	ZSC	Jean-Guy Trudel	Hooking	37:32	2:00
3rd	ZSC	Thibaut Monnet	Slashing	48:28	2:00
3rd	CHI	Dustin Byfuglien	Hooking	49:43	2:00
3rd	CHI	Jack Skille	Equipment Infraction	53:16	2:00
3rd	ZSC	Mark Bastl	Hooking	54:04	2:00
3rd	CHI	Dave Bolland	Boarding	54:19	2:00
3rd	CHI	Brent Seabrook	Hooking	56:46	PS

== Team rosters ==
ZSC Lions
#		Player	Position
4	(Switzerland)	Patrick Geering	D
7	(Switzerland)	Thibaut Monnet (A)	F
9	(Canada)	Domenic Pittis	F
10	(Switzerland)	Cyrill Bühler	F
11	(Switzerland)	Andri Stoffel	D
13	(Slovakia)	Peter Sejna	F
14	(Switzerland)	Pascal Müller	D
15	(Switzerland)	Mathias Seger (C)	D
17	(Switzerland)	Lukas Grauwiler	F
18	(Switzerland)	Daniel Schnyder	D
19	(Canada)	Jean-Guy Trudel	F
22	(Switzerland)	Mike Wolf	F
25	(Slovakia)	Radoslav Suchý	D
27	(Canada)	André Signoretti	D
28	(Switzerland)	Philippe Schelling	D
30	(Switzerland)	Lukas Flüeler	G
31	(Finland)	Ari Sulander	G
34	(Switzerland)	Claudio Cadonau	D
39	(Switzerland)	Mark Bastl	F
43	(Canada)	Jan Alston	F
51	(Switzerland)	Ryan Gardner (A)	F
61	(Russia)	Alexei Krutov	F
71	(Canada)	Patrick Bärtschi	F
77	(Switzerland)	Alan Reist	D
79	(Switzerland)	Oliver Kamber	F
82	(Canada)	Blaine Down	F
84	(Switzerland)	Patrick Schommer	F
97	(Switzerland)	Adrian Wichser	F
(Canada)		Head coach: Sean Simpson	

Chicago Blackhawks
#		Player	Position
2	(Canada)	Duncan Keith (A)	D
4	(Sweden)	Niklas Hjalmarsson	D
5	(Canada)	Brent Sopel	D
6	(Canada)	Jordan Hendry	D
7	(Canada)	Brent Seabrook	D
10	(Canada)	Patrick Sharp (A)	F
11	(Canada)	John Madden	F
16	(Canada)	Andrew Ladd	F
19	(Canada)	Jonathan Toews (C)	F
20	(United States)	Jack Skille	F
22	(Canada)	Troy Brouwer	F
23	(Canada)	Aaron Johnson	D
25	(Canada)	Cam Barker	D
28	(United States)	Jacob Dowell	F
29	(Canada)	Bryan Bickell	F
31	(Finland)	Antti Niemi	G
32	(Canada)	Kris Versteeg	F
33	(United States)	Dustin Byfuglien	F
36	(Canada)	Dave Bolland	F
39	(France)	Cristobal Huet	G
46	(Canada)	Colin Fraser	F
47	(Canada)	Evan Brophey	F
50	(Canada)	Corey Crawford	G
51	(Canada)	Brian Campbell	D
52	(Czech Republic)	Radek Smolenak	F
55	(Canada)	Ben Eager	F
59	(Canada)	Rob Klinkhammer	F
82	(Slovakia)	Tomas Kopecky	F
88	(United States)	Patrick Kane	F
(Canada)		Head coach: Joel Quenneville	

Lukas Flueler dressed for the ZSC Lions as the back-up goalie and did not enter the game.
Antti Niemi dressed for the Chicago Blackhawks as the back-up goalie and did not enter the game.

Source
ZSC Lions, Chicago Blackhawks

=== Officials ===
- Referees - (Russia) Vyacheslav Bulanov, (Canada) Daniel Marouelli
- Linesmen - (Czech Republic) Frantisek Kalovoda, (United States) Tim Nowak
