= Igor Dorofeyev =

Russian ice hockey player (born 1968)

- Born: August 10, 1968 (age 57) Dmitrov, Soviet Union
- Height: 5 ft 10 in (178 cm)
- Weight: 185 lb (84 kg; 13 st 3 lb)
- Position: Right wing
- Shot: Left
- Played for: HC Dynamo Moscow; HC Ambri-Piotta; Val Pusteria Wolves; Krylya Sovetov Moscow; Avangard Omsk
- Playing career: 1985–2002

Igor Vitalevich Dorofeyev (Russian: Игорь Витальевич Дорофеев; born August 10, 1968) is a Russian former professional ice hockey forward.

He played the majority of his career for HC Dynamo Moscow, winning 5 championships with the team and the 1991 Tampere Cup. He also played for Krylya Sovetov Moscow and Avangard Omsk, as well as HC Ambri-Piotta of the Swiss Nationalliga A, the Val Pusteral Wolves of Italy's Serie A and Oji Senshi Hockey of the Japan Ice Hockey League.

== Career statistics ==
			Regular season					Playoffs
Season	Team	League	GP	G	A	Pts	PIM	GP	G	A	Pts	PIM
1985–86	HC Dynamo Moscow	USSR	17	2	0	2	?	—	—	—	—	—
1986–87	HC Dynamo Moscow	USSR	13	3	2	5	?	—	—	—	—	—
1987–88	HC Dynamo Moscow	USSR	40	11	3	14	4	—	—	—	—	—
1988–89	HC Dynamo Moscow	USSR	44	16	6	22	4	—	—	—	—	—
1989–90	HC Dynamo Moscow	USSR	47	18	16	34	8	—	—	—	—	—
1990–91	HC Dynamo Moscow	USSR	28	7	11	18	6	—	—	—	—	—
1991–92	HC Dynamo Moscow	CIS	23	4	9	13	6	—	—	—	—	—
1992–93	HC Dynamo Moscow	IHL	22	4	4	8	8	6	2	1	3	0
1992–93	HC Ambri-Piotta	NLA	12	11	3	14	6	5	4	0	4	2
1993–94	HC Dynamo Moscow	IHL	45	21	14	35	12	—	—	—	—	—
1994–95	Val Pusteria Wolves	Serie A	34	29	41	70	45	2	1	0	1	0
1994–95	HC Dynamo Moscow	IHL	3	1	0	1	2	6	0	0	0	4
1995–96	HC Dynamo Moscow	IHL	40	2	11	13	12	—	—	—	—	—
1996–97	New Oji Seishi Tomakomai	JPN	29	17	31	48	30	—	—	—	—	—
1997–98	New Oji Seishi Tomakomai	JPN	34	15	34	49	?	—	—	—	—	—
1998–99	Krylya Sovetov Moscow	RSL	5	1	2	3	0	—	—	—	—	—
1998–99	Avangard Omsk	RSL	18	1	4	5	9	—	—	—	—	—
2001–02	HC MGU Moscow	EEHL	40	15	17	32	14	—	—	—	—	—

== International statistics ==
Year	Team	Event	Place	GP	G	A	Pts	PIM
1988	Soviet Union	WJC	2nd place, silver medalist(s)	7	4	1	4	4
