= List of international games played by NHL teams =

Throughout the history of the National Hockey League (NHL), there has been a long-standing tradition of international games played by NHL teams. The following is a list of games played by NHL teams against other NHL teams and non-NHL teams outside the United States and Canada, as well games played by NHL teams in the United States and Canada against non-North American teams.

The first NHL international games were held as part of the 1938 Detroit Red Wings–Montreal Canadiens European tour, where the Detroit Red Wings and the Montreal Canadiens played a nine-game series in various cities in Britain and France from April 21 to May 14. That first game played on April 21, 1938 was the first one organized by any major professional sports leagues in the United States and Canada, to take place outside North America. Since then, the league has staged games throughout Europe and in Japan, China, and Australia. While most NHL international games have been exhibition or preseason contests, the first ones to count towards the league's regular seasons standings were held in October 3–4, 1997, when the Mighty Ducks of Anaheim and the Vancouver Canucks played a two-game series in Japan to open the 1997–98 regular season.

In the tables below:

- **Bolded** team names denote winners.
- † Indicates regular season games.

== Europe ==
=== 1938 Detroit Red Wings–Montreal Canadiens European tour ===
In 1938, for the first time in NHL history two of the league's teams, the Detroit Red Wings and the Montreal Canadiens, went on a tour of Europe with a nine-game series in Britain and France. The Canadiens won the series with a record of 5–3–1.

Date	City	Arena	Team	Team	Score
April 21	London, United Kingdom	Empress Hall, Earl's Court	Detroit Red Wings	**Montreal Canadiens**	5–4 (OT)
April 23	Brighton, United Kingdom	Sports Stadium Brighton	Detroit Red Wings	Montreal Canadiens	5–5
April 25	Paris, France	Palais des Sports	Detroit Red Wings	**Montreal Canadiens**	10–8
April 27	Paris, France	Palais des Sports	**Detroit Red Wings**	Montreal Canadiens	4–3
April 29	Paris, France	Palais des Sports	Detroit Red Wings	**Montreal Canadiens**	7–5
May 5	London, United Kingdom	Empress Hall, Earl's Court	Detroit Red Wings	**Montreal Canadiens**	6–3
May 7	Brighton, United Kingdom	Sports Stadium Brighton	**Detroit Red Wings**	Montreal Canadiens	10–5
May 10	London, United Kingdom	Empress Hall, Earl's Court	Detroit Red Wings	**Montreal Canadiens**	5–4
May 14	Brighton, United Kingdom	Sports Stadium Brighton	**Detroit Red Wings**	Montreal Canadiens	5–2

=== 1959 Boston Bruins–New York Rangers European tour ===
In 1959, the Boston Bruins and the New York Rangers (aided by Bobby Hull, Ed Litzenberger, Eric Nesterenko, and Pierre Pilote of the Chicago Black Hawks) went on a 23-game tour of Europe, visiting England, Switzerland, France, Belgium, West Germany, and Austria. The Rangers won the series with a record of 11–9–3.

The first game in Geneva was attended by a sell-out crowd of 11,000, the attendance for the Zurich games was 4,500 and 2,000. In Berlin, only 600 people went to see the first game.

Date	City	Arena	Team	Team	Score	Attendance
April 29	London, United Kingdom	Empire Pool, Wembley	**Boston Bruins**	New York Rangers	7–5	
April 30	London, United Kingdom	Empire Pool, Wembley	Boston Bruins	**New York Rangers**	4–2	5,000
May 2	Geneva, Switzerland	Patinoire des Vernets	Boston Bruins	**New York Rangers**	4–3	11,000
May 3	Geneva, Switzerland	Patinoire des Vernets	**Boston Bruins**	New York Rangers	12–4	
May 4	Boulogne-Billancourt, France	Patinoire de Boulogne-Billancourt	Boston Bruins	**New York Rangers**	6–2	
May 5	Boulogne-Billancourt, France	Patinoire de Boulogne-Billancourt	**Boston Bruins**	New York Rangers	6–4	
May 6	Antwerp, Belgium	Sportpaleis	**Boston Bruins**	New York Rangers	6–3	
May 7	Antwerp, Belgium	Sportpaleis	Boston Bruins	**New York Rangers**	6–3	
May 8	Antwerp, Belgium	Sportpaleis	Boston Bruins	**New York Rangers**	8–4	
May 9	Zurich, Switzerland	Hallenstadion	Boston Bruins	**New York Rangers**	7–6	4,500
May 10	Zurich, Switzerland	Hallenstadion	**Boston Bruins**	New York Rangers	4–2	2,000
May 12	Dortmund, West Germany	Westfalenhallen	Boston Bruins	**New York Rangers**	4–2	
May 13	Dortmund, West Germany	Westfalenhallen	**Boston Bruins**	New York Rangers	6–4	
May 14	Essen, West Germany	Grugahalle	**Boston Bruins**	New York Rangers	6–4	
May 15	Essen, West Germany	Grugahalle	Boston Bruins	**New York Rangers**	4–3	
May 16	Krefeld, West Germany	Rheinlandhalle	Boston Bruins	**New York Rangers**	8–0	
May 17	Krefeld, West Germany	Rheinlandhalle	Boston Bruins	**New York Rangers**	7–2	
May 19	West Berlin, West Germany	Sportpalast	Boston Bruins	New York Rangers	6–6	600
May 20	West Berlin, West Germany	Sportpalast	Boston Bruins	**New York Rangers**	3–2	
May 21	West Berlin, West Germany	Sportpalast	**Boston Bruins**	New York Rangers	8–2	
May 22	Vienna, Austria	Wiener Stadthalle	Boston Bruins	New York Rangers	2–2	
May 23	Vienna, Austria	Wiener Stadthalle	**Boston Bruins**	New York Rangers	5–3	
May 24	Vienna, Austria	Wiener Stadthalle	Boston Bruins	New York Rangers	4–4	

=== 1975–76 Super Series ===
In late 1975 and early 1976, two Soviet League teams from Moscow, Soviet Union (CSKA, also known as "Red Army", and Krylya Sovetov, also known as "Soviet Wings") played an eight-game series against several NHL teams (the Chicago Black Hawks, the Boston Bruins, the Buffalo Sabres, the Montreal Canadiens, the New York Islanders, the New York Rangers, the Philadelphia Flyers, and the Pittsburgh Penguins). The games took place in the United States and Canada. The Soviet teams won the series with a record of 5–2–1. Individually, CSKA had a record of 2–1–1 and Krylya Sovetov had a record of 3–1–0.

Date	City	Arena	Team	Team	Score	Attendance
December 28, 1975	New York, United States	Madison Square Garden	**CSKA Moscow**	New York Rangers	7–3	17,500
December 29, 1975	Pittsburgh, United States	Civic Arena	**Krylya Sovetov Moscow**	Pittsburgh Penguins	7–4	13,218
December 31, 1975	Montreal, Canada	Montreal Forum	CSKA Moscow	Montreal Canadiens	3–3	18,975
January 4, 1976	Buffalo, United States	Buffalo Memorial Auditorium	Krylya Sovetov Moscow	**Buffalo Sabres**	6–12	16,433
January 7, 1976	Chicago, United States	Chicago Stadium	**Krylya Sovetov Moscow**	Chicago Black Hawks	4–2	18,500
January 8, 1976	Boston, United States	Boston Garden	**CSKA Moscow**	Boston Bruins	5–2	15,003
January 10, 1976	Uniondale, United States	Nassau Veterans Memorial Coliseum	**Krylya Sovetov Moscow**	New York Islanders	2–1	14,865
January 11, 1976	Philadelphia, United States	Spectrum	CSKA Moscow	**Philadelphia Flyers**	1–4	17,077

=== 1977–78 Czechoslovak NHL tour and Super Series ===
In late 1977 and early 1978, two Czechoslovak teams (TJ Poldi SONP Kladno and Tesla Pardubice) along with one Soviet team (Spartak Moscow) went on a 13-game tour of the NHL, playing against several NHL teams (the Atlanta Flames, the Chicago Black Hawks, the Cleveland Barons, the Colorado Rockies, the Detroit Red Wings, the Minnesota North Stars, the Montreal Canadiens, the New York Islanders, the New York Rangers, the Philadelphia Flyers, the St. Louis Blues, the Toronto Maple Leafs, and the Vancouver Canucks). Games took place in the United States and Canada. Both sides finished the series with 6–6–1 records. Individually, Kladno had a record of 2–1–1, Pardubice had a record of 1–3–0 (combined Czech record of 3–4–1), and Spartak had a record of 3–2–0.

Date	City	Arena	Team	Team	Score	Attendance
December 26, 1977	New York, United States	Madison Square Garden	Poldi Kladno	New York Rangers	4–4	10,123
December 26, 1977	Philadelphia, United States	Spectrum	Tesla Pardubice	**Philadelphia Flyers**	1–6	
December 28, 1977	Vancouver, Canada	Pacific Coliseum	Spartak Moscow	**Vancouver Canucks**	0–2	
December 28, 1977	Bloomington, United States	Metropolitan Sports Center	**Tesla Pardubice**	Minnesota North Stars	4–2	
December 31, 1977	Chicago, United States	Chicago Stadium	**Poldi Kladno**	Chicago Black Hawks	6–4	
January 2, 1978	Toronto, Canada	Maple Leaf Gardens	**Poldi Kladno**	Toronto Maple Leafs	8–5	
January 2, 1978	Detroit, United States	Detroit Olympia	Tesla Pardubice	**Detroit Red Wings**	4–5	
January 3, 1978	Denver, United States	McNichols Sports Arena	**Spartak Moscow**	Colorado Rockies	8–3	
January 4, 1978	Richfield, United States	Richfield Coliseum	Poldi Kladno	**Cleveland Barons**	3–4	
January 4, 1978	Uniondale, United States	Nassau Veterans Memorial Coliseum	Tesla Pardubice	**New York Islanders**	3–8	9,437
January 5, 1978	St. Louis, United States	Checkerdome	**Spartak Moscow**	St. Louis Blues	2–1	
January 6, 1978	Montreal, Canada	Montreal Forum	Spartak Moscow	**Montreal Canadiens**	2–5	
January 8, 1978	Atlanta, United States	Omni Coliseum	**Spartak Moscow**	Atlanta Flames	2–1	

=== 1978–79 Super Series ===
In late 1978 and early 1979, Soviet Union's Krylya Sovetov from Moscow played a four-game series against NHL teams (the Boston Bruins, the Detroit Red Wings, the Minnesota North Stars, and the Philadelphia Flyers). Games took place in the United States. Krylya Sovetov won the series with a 2–1–1 record.

Date	City	Arenas	Team	Team	Score
December 31, 1978	Bloomington, United States	Metropolitan Sports Center	**Krylya Sovetov**	Minnesota North Stars	8–5
January 2, 1979	Philadelphia, United States	Spectrum	Krylya Sovetov	Philadelphia Flyers	4–4
January 4, 1979	Detroit, United States	Detroit Olympia	Krylya Sovetov	**Detroit Red Wings**	5–6
January 9, 1979	Boston, United States	Boston Garden	**Krylya Sovetov**	Boston Bruins	4–1

=== 1979 Challenge Cup ===
The 1979 Challenge Cup was a series of international ice hockey games between the Soviet Union national ice hockey team and a team of All-Stars from the National Hockey League. The games were played on February 8, 10, and 11 at Madison Square Garden in New York City. It replaced the NHL's all-star festivities for the 1978–79 NHL season. The Soviets defeated the NHL All-Stars 2 games to 1.

Date	City	Arena	Team	Team	Score	Attendance
February 8, 1979	New York, United States	Madison Square Garden	**NHL All-Stars**	Soviet Union	4–2	17,438
February 10, 1979	New York, United States	Madison Square Garden	**Soviet Union**	NHL All-Stars	5–4	17,438
February 11, 1979	New York, United States	Madison Square Garden	**Soviet Union**	NHL All-Stars	6–0	17,545

=== 1979–80 Super Series ===
In late 1979 and early 1980, two Soviet teams from Moscow, CSKA and Dynamo, played a nine-game series against several NHL teams (the Buffalo Sabres, the Edmonton Oilers, the Montreal Canadiens, the New York Islanders, the New York Rangers, the Quebec Nordiques, the Vancouver Canucks, the Washington Capitals, and the original Winnipeg Jets). Games took place in the United States and Canada. The Moscow teams won the series with a record of 5–3–1. Individually, CSKA had a record of 3–2–0, and Dynamo had a record of 2–1–1.

Date	City	Arena	Team	Team	Score	Attendance
December 26, 1979	Vancouver, Canada	Pacific Coliseum	Dynamo Moscow	**Vancouver Canucks**	2–6	
December 27, 1979	New York, United States	Madison Square Garden	**CSKA Moscow**	New York Rangers	5–2	17,429
December 29, 1979	Uniondale, United States	Nassau Veterans Memorial Coliseum	**CSKA Moscow**	New York Islanders	3–2	10,123
December 31, 1979	Montreal, Canada	Montreal Forum	CSKA Moscow	**Montreal Canadiens**	2–4	17,000
January 2, 1980	Winnipeg, Canada	Winnipeg Arena	**Dynamo Moscow**	Winnipeg Jets	7–0	
January 3, 1980	Buffalo, United States	Buffalo Memorial Auditorium	CSKA Moscow	**Buffalo Sabres**	1–6	
January 4, 1980	Edmonton, Canada	Northlands Coliseum	**Dynamo Moscow**	Edmonton Oilers	4–1	
January 6, 1980	Quebec City, Canada	Colisée de Québec	**CSKA Moscow**	Quebec Nordiques	6–4	
January 8, 1980	Landover, United States	Capital Centre	Dynamo Moscow	Washington Capitals	5–5	

=== 1980 DN-Cup ===
In 1980, the Minnesota North Stars and the Washington Capitals participated in the DN-Cup, a round-robin tournament in Sweden sponsored by the newspaper Dagens Nyheter, with Swedish teams AIK and Djurgården from Stockholm. Six games were played in total, five involving the NHL teams (AIK beat Djurgården 1–0 on September 21, attendance: 2,668). Washington won the tournament with a 3–0–0 record, Minnesota finished second with 2–1–0, AIK finished third and Djurgården last.

Date	City	Arena	Team	Team	Score	Attendance
September 22	Stockholm, Sweden	Johanneshovs Isstadion	**Washington Capitals**	Minnesota North Stars	4–3 2OT	4,288
September 23	Stockholm, Sweden	Johanneshovs Isstadion	**Minnesota North Stars**	Djurgården Stockholm	8–0	3,663
September 24	Stockholm, Sweden	Johanneshovs Isstadion	**Washington Capitals**	AIK Stockholm	2–1	4,104
September 25	Stockholm, Sweden	Johanneshovs Isstadion	**Minnesota North Stars**	AIK Stockholm	4–3	2,895
September 26	Stockholm, Sweden	Johanneshovs Isstadion	**Washington Capitals**	Djurgården Stockholm	3–2	5,873

=== 1981 DN-Cup ===
In 1981, the New York Rangers and the Washington Capitals participated in the round-robin DN-Cup in Sweden with Swedish teams Västra Frölunda, AIK, and Djurgården. The New York won the tournament with a 4–0–0 record, ahead of AIK, Västra Frölunda, Washington (1–3–0) and Djurgården. The list of DN-Cup games excludes three games played without NHL participation. (Note: Other games: September 18, Gothenburg (Scandinavium), Västra Frölunda – Djurgården 5–4, attendance: 719.; September 20, Stockholm (Johanneshovs Isstadion), Djurgården – AIK 4–2, attendance: 4,459.; September 21, Gothenburg (Scandinavium), Västra Frölunda – AIK 0–5, attendance: 806.)

Each NHL team played an additional game in Finland, against HIFK and Oulun Kärpät. In total, the NHL teams posted a record of 5–3–0 against the European teams, New York finished 3–1–0, Washington 2–2–0 (excluding the NHL-only game).

==== DN-Cup ====
Date	City	Arena	Team	Team	Score	Attendance
September 17	Stockholm, Sweden	Johanneshovs Isstadion	**New York Rangers**	Djurgården Stockholm	5–1	6,652
September 17	Gothenburg, Sweden	Scandinavium	Washington Capitals	**Västra Frölunda Gothenburg**	4–7	1,392
September 18	Stockholm, Sweden	Johanneshovs Isstadion	Washington Capitals	**AIK Stockholm**	1–6	3,000
September 20	Södertälje, Sweden	Scaniarinken	**New York Rangers**	Washington Capitals	4–1	5,658
September 22	Stockholm, Sweden	Johanneshovs Isstadion	**Washington Capitals**	Djurgården Stockholm	5–2	2,734
September 22	Gothenburg, Sweden	Scandinavium	**New York Rangers**	Västra Frölunda Gothenburg	7–1	3,087
September 23	Stockholm, Sweden	Johanneshovs Isstadion	**New York Rangers**	AIK Stockholm	4–1	9,167

==== Other games ====
Date	City	Arena	Team	Team	Score	Attendance
September 16	Helsinki, Finland	Helsinki Ice Hall	New York Rangers	**HIFK Helsinki**	1–4	
September 24	Oulu, Finland	Raksilan jäähalli	**Washington Capitals**	Oulun Kärpät	5–3	

=== 1982–83 Super Series ===
In late 1982 and early 1983, the Soviet Union national team played a six-game series against several NHL teams (the Calgary Flames, the Edmonton Oilers, the Minnesota North Stars, the Montreal Canadiens, the Philadelphia Flyers, and the Quebec Nordiques). Games took place in the United States and Canada. The Soviet Union team won the series with a 4–2–0 record.

Date	City	Arena	Team	Team	Score
December 28, 1982	Edmonton, Canada	Northlands Coliseum	Soviet Union	**Edmonton Oilers**	3–4
December 30, 1982	Quebec City, Canada	Colisée de Québec	**Soviet Union**	Quebec Nordiques	3–0
December 31, 1982	Montreal, Canada	Montreal Forum	**Soviet Union**	Montreal Canadiens	5–0
January 2, 1983	Calgary, Canada	Stampede Corral	Soviet Union	**Calgary Flames**	2–3
January 4, 1983	Bloomington, United States	Met Center	**Soviet Union**	Minnesota North Stars	6–3
January 6, 1983	Philadelphia, United States	Spectrum	**Soviet Union**	Philadelphia Flyers	5–1

=== 1985–86 Super Series ===
In late 1985 and early 1986, two Soviet teams from Moscow, CSKA and Dynamo, played a ten-game series against several NHL teams (the Boston Bruins, the Buffalo Sabres, the Calgary Flames, the Edmonton Oilers, the Los Angeles Kings, the Minnesota North Stars, the Montreal Canadiens, the Pittsburgh Penguins, the Quebec Nordiques, and the St. Louis Blues). Games took place in the United States and Canada. The Moscow teams won the series with a record of 7–2–1. Individually, CSKA had a record of 5–1–0 and Dynamo had a record of 2–1–1.

Date	City	Arena	Team	Team	Score	Attendance
December 26, 1985	Inglewood, United States	The Forum	**CSKA Moscow**	Los Angeles Kings	5–2	16,005
December 27, 1985	Edmonton, Canada	Northlands Coliseum	**CSKA Moscow**	Edmonton Oilers	6–3	17,498
December 29, 1985	Quebec City, Canada	Colisée de Québec	CSKA Moscow	**Quebec Nordiques**	1–5	
December 29, 1985	Calgary, Canada	Olympic Saddledome	Dynamo Moscow	**Calgary Flames**	3–4	
December 31, 1985	Montreal, Canada	Montreal Forum	**CSKA Moscow**	Montreal Canadiens	6–1	
January 2, 1986	St. Louis, United States	St. Louis Arena	**CSKA Moscow**	St. Louis Blues	4–2	
January 4, 1986	Bloomington, United States	Met Center	**CSKA Moscow**	Minnesota North Stars	4–3 (OT)	
January 4, 1986	Pittsburgh, United States	Civic Arena	Dynamo Moscow	Pittsburgh Penguins	3–3	16,033
January 6, 1986	Boston, United States	Boston Garden	**Dynamo Moscow**	Boston Bruins	6–4	
January 8, 1986	Buffalo, United States	Buffalo Memorial Auditorium	**Dynamo Moscow**	Buffalo Sabres	7–4	

=== Rendez-vous '87 ===
Rendez-vous '87 was a series of international ice hockey games between the Soviet Union national ice hockey team and a team of All-Stars from the National Hockey League. The games were played on February 11 and 13 at Le Colisée in Quebec City. It replaced the NHL's all-star festivities for the 1986–87 NHL season. Both teams won one of the two games, with the Soviets winning overall on total score, 8–7.

Date	City	Arena	Team	Team	Score	Attendance
February 11, 1987	Quebec City, Canada	Colisée de Québec	Soviet Union	**NHL All-Stars**	3–4	15,398
February 13, 1987	Quebec City, Canada	Colisée de Québec	**Soviet Union**	NHL All-Stars	5–3	15,395

=== 1988–89 Super Series ===
In late 1988 and early 1989 two Soviet League teams, CSKA Moscow and Dinamo Riga, played a 14-games series against several NHL teams (the Boston Bruins, the Buffalo Sabres, the Calgary Flames, the Chicago Blackhawks, the Edmonton Oilers, the Hartford Whalers, the Los Angeles Kings, the Minnesota North Stars, the New Jersey Devils, the New York Islanders, the Pittsburgh Penguins, the Quebec Nordiques, the St. Louis Blues, and the Vancouver Canucks). Games took place in the United States and Canada. Both sides finished with a record of 6–6–2. Individually, CSKA had a record of 4–2–1 and Dinamo had a record of 2–4–1.

Date	City	Arena	Team	Team	Score
December 26, 1988	Quebec City, Canada	Colisée de Québec	CSKA Moscow	Quebec Nordiques	5–5
December 27, 1988	Calgary, Canada	Olympic Saddledome	Dinamo Riga	Calgary Flames	2–2
December 28, 1988	Edmonton, Canada	Northlands Coliseum	Dinamo Riga	**Edmonton Oilers**	1–2
December 29, 1988	Uniondale, United States	Nassau Coliseum	**CSKA Moscow**	New York Islanders	3–2
December 30, 1988	Vancouver, Canada	Pacific Coliseum	Dinamo Riga	**Vancouver Canucks**	1–6
December 31, 1988	Boston, United States	Boston Garden	**CSKA Moscow**	Boston Bruins	5–4
December 31, 1988	Inglewood, United States	Great Western Forum	**Dinamo Riga**	Los Angeles Kings	5–3
January 2, 1989	East Rutherford, United States	Brendan Byrne Arena	**CSKA Moscow**	New Jersey Devils	5–0
January 4, 1989	Pittsburgh, United States	Civic Arena	CSKA Moscow	**Pittsburgh Penguins**	2–4
January 4, 1989	Chicago, United States	Chicago Stadium	Dinamo Riga	**Chicago Blackhawks**	1–4
January 5, 1989	St. Louis, United States	St. Louis Arena	Dinamo Riga	**St. Louis Blues**	0–5
January 7, 1989	Bloomington, United States	Met Center	**Dinamo Riga**	Minnesota North Stars	2–1
January 7, 1989	Hartford, United States	Hartford Civic Center	**CSKA Moscow**	Hartford Whalers	6–3
January 9, 1989	Buffalo, United States	Buffalo Memorial Auditorium	CSKA Moscow	**Buffalo Sabres**	5–6 (OT)

=== 1989 Friendship Tour ===
In 1989, the Calgary Flames and the Washington Capitals went on a twelve-game European tour, playing against teams from Sweden (Färjestad BK and Brynäs IF) and the Soviet Union (CSKA Moscow, Dynamo Moscow, Dinamo Riga, Khimik Voskresensk, Krylya Sovetov Moscow, SKA Leningrad, Sokol Kiev, and Spartak Moscow). The Flames preceded these games with a two-game series in Czechoslovakia against the Czechoslovakia national team, losing both. The NHL teams won the series with a record of 7–5–0 (0–2–0 against Czechoslovakia, 1–1–0 against the Swedish teams, and 6–2–0 against Soviet teams). Individually, Calgary had a record of 3–3–0 and Washington had a record of 4–2–0.

Date	City	Arena	Team	Team	Score	Attendance
September 10	Prague, Czechoslovakia	Sportovní hala ČSTV	Calgary Flames	**Czechoslovakia**	2–4	
September 11	Prague, Czechoslovakia	Sportovní hala ČSTV	Calgary Flames	**Czechoslovakia**	1–4	
September 12	Karlstad, Sweden	Färjestads Ishall	Washington Capitals	**Färjestad BK**	4–7	
September 13	Gävle, Sweden	Gavlerinken	**Washington Capitals**	Brynäs IF	3–1	
September 14	Leningrad, Soviet Union	V. I. Lenin Sport & Concert Complex	**Calgary Flames**	Khimik Voskresensk	4–2	14,000
September 15	Moscow, Soviet Union	Luzhniki Palace of Sports	**Washington Capitals**	Spartak Moscow	8–7 (OT)	10,000
September 16	Kiev, Soviet Union	Palace of Sports	**Calgary Flames**	Sokol Kiev	5–2	6,900
September 17	Moscow, Soviet Union	Luzhniki Palace of Sports	Washington Capitals	**Dynamo Moscow**	2–7	8,700
September 18	Moscow, Soviet Union	Luzhniki Palace of Sports	**Calgary Flames**	Krylya Sovetov Moscow	3–2 (OT)	6,000
September 19	Riga, Soviet Union	Palace of Sports	**Washington Capitals**	Dinamo Riga	2–1 (OT)	5,000
September 20	Moscow, Soviet Union	Luzniki Palace of Sports	Calgary Flames	**CSKA Moscow**	1–2	12,000
September 21	Leningrad, Soviet Union	V. I. Lenin Sport & Concert Complex	**Washington Capitals**	SKA Leningrad	5–4	8,500

=== 1989–90 Super Series ===
In late 1989 and early 1990 a record four Soviet teams (CSKA Moscow, Dynamo Moscow, Khimik Voskresensk, and Krylya Sovetov Moscow went on a 21-game tour of North America, playing against every NHL team (the Boston Bruins, the Buffalo Sabres, the Calgary Flames, the Chicago Blackhawks, the Detroit Red Wings, the Edmonton Oilers, the Hartford Whalers, the Los Angeles Kings, the Minnesota North Stars, the Montreal Canadiens, the New Jersey Devils, the New York Islanders, the New York Rangers, the Philadelphia Flyers, the Pittsburgh Penguins, the Quebec Nordiques, the St. Louis Blues, the Toronto Maple Leafs, the Vancouver Canucks, the Washington Capitals, and the original Winnipeg Jets). Games took place in the United States and Canada. The Soviet teams won the series with a record of 11–9–1. Individually, CSKA had a record of 4–1–0, Dynamo had a record of 3–2–0, Khimik had a record of 3–3–0, and Krylya Sovetov had a record of 1–3–1.

Date	City	Arena	Team	Team	Score
December 4, 1989	Inglewood, United States	Great Western Forum	**Khimik Voskresensk**	Los Angeles Kings	6–3
December 6, 1989	Edmonton, Canada	Northlands Coliseum	Khimik Voskresensk	**Edmonton Oilers**	2–6
December 8, 1989	Calgary, Canada	Olympic Saddledome	Khimik Voskresensk	**Calgary Flames**	3–6
December 11, 1989	Detroit, United States	Joe Louis Arena	**Khimik Voskresensk**	Detroit Red Wings	4–2
December 12, 1989	Landover, United States	Capital Centre	Khimik Voskresensk	**Washington Capitals**	2–5
December 14, 1989	St. Louis, United States	St. Louis Arena	**Khimik Voskresensk**	St. Louis Blues	6–3
December 26, 1989	Uniondale, United States	Nassau Coliseum	Krylya Sovetov Moscow	**New York Islanders**	4–5
December 27, 1989	Hartford, United States	Hartford Civic Center	Krylya Sovetov Moscow	**Hartford Whalers**	3–4 (OT)
December 27, 1989	Winnipeg, Canada	Winnipeg Arena	CSKA Moscow	**Winnipeg Jets**	1–4
December 29, 1989	Pittsburgh, United States	Civic Arena	**Dynamo Moscow**	Pittsburgh Penguins	5–2
December 29, 1989	Vancouver, Canada	Pacific Coliseum	**CSKA Moscow**	Vancouver Canucks	6–0
December 31, 1989	Quebec City, Canada	Colisée de Québec	Krylya Sovetov Moscow	Quebec Nordiques	4–4
December 31, 1989	Toronto, Canada	Maple Leaf Gardens	**Dynamo Moscow**	Toronto Maple Leafs	7–4
January 1, 1990	New York, United States	Madison Square Garden	**Krylya Sovetov Moscow**	New York Rangers	3–1
January 2, 1990	Bloomington, United States	Met Center	**CSKA Moscow**	Minnesota North Stars	4–2
January 3, 1990	Montreal, Canada	Montreal Forum	Krylya Sovetov Moscow	**Montreal Canadiens**	1–2
January 3, 1990	Buffalo, United States	Buffalo Memorial Auditorium	Dynamo Moscow	**Buffalo Sabres**	2–4
January 6, 1990	East Rutherford, United States	Brendan Byrne Arena	Dynamo Moscow	**New Jersey Devils**	1–7
January 7, 1990	Chicago, United States	Chicago Stadium	**CSKA Moscow**	Chicago Blackhawks	6–4
January 9, 1990	Philadelphia, United States	Spectrum	**CSKA Moscow**	Philadelphia Flyers	5–4
January 9, 1990	Boston, United States	Boston Garden	**Dynamo Moscow**	Boston Bruins	3–1

=== 1990 Edmonton Oilers–St. Louis Blues European tournament ===
In 1990, the Edmonton Oilers and the St. Louis Blues participated in the Epson Cup played in Düsseldorf with hosts Düsseldorfer EG. The Oilers then played two more games against EC Graz of Austria, and EC Hedos Munich of Germany. The NHL teams posted a record of 4–0–0, excluding the NHL-only game.

Date	City	Arena	Team	Team	Score	Attendance
September 6	Düsseldorf, West Germany	Eisstadion an der Brehmstraße	**St. Louis Blues**	Düsseldorfer EG	3–1	5,800
September 7	Düsseldorf, West Germany	Eisstadion an der Brehmstraße	**St. Louis Blues**	Edmonton Oilers	10–1	5,000
September 8	Düsseldorf, West Germany	Eisstadion an der Brehmstraße	**Edmonton Oilers**	Düsseldorfer EG	2–0	8,125
September 14	Graz, Austria	Eisstadion Liebenau	**Edmonton Oilers**	EC Graz	12–3	5,000
September 15	Munich, West Germany	Olympia-Eissportzentrum	**Edmonton Oilers**	EC Hedos Munich	8–4	6,300

=== 1990 Friendship Tour ===
In 1990, the Minnesota North Stars and the Montreal Canadiens went on a nine-game tour of Europe, dubbed the Friendship Tour '90, with a game in Sweden against AIK, and the rest in the Soviet Union against CSKA Moscow, Dynamo Moscow, Khimik Voskresensk, Krylya Sovetov Moscow, a SKA Leningrad/Torpedo Yaroslavl joint squad, Sokol Kiev, Spartak Moscow, and Latvian (the country declared its independence from the Soviet Union on 4 May) team Dinamo Riga. The European teams won the series with a record of 5–4–0. Individually, the Canadiens had a record of 3–2–0 and the North Stars had a record of 1–3–0.

For the game in Sweden, the NHL had required the Canadiens to wear generic orange jerseys with the NHL shield, but backed off when the organisation was uncooperative.

Date	City	Arena	Team	Team	Score	Attendance
September 10	Stockholm, Sweden	Stockholm Globe Arena	**Montreal Canadiens**	AIK Stockholm	7–1	8,658
September 12	Leningrad, Soviet Union	Yubileyny Sports Palace	**Montreal Canadiens**	SKA Leningrad/Torpedo Yaroslavl	5–3	6,500 or 7,000
September 13	Moscow, Soviet Union	Luzhniki Palace of Sports	Minnesota North Stars	**Spartak Moscow**	5–8	7,000
September 14	Riga, Latvia	Palace of Sports	**Montreal Canadiens**	Dinamo Riga	4–2	5,500 or 5,000
September 15	Moscow, Soviet Union	Luzhniki Palace of Sports	Minnesota North Stars	**Krylya Sovetov Moscow**	2–3 (OT)	3,500
September 16	Moscow, Soviet Union	Luzhniki Palace of Sports	Montreal Canadiens	**Dynamo Moscow**	1–4	10,000
September 17	Voskresensk, Soviet Union	Podmoskovie Ice Palace	**Minnesota North Stars**	Khimik Voskresensk	3–2	3,000
September 18	Moscow, Soviet Union	Luzhniki Palace of Sports	Montreal Canadiens	**CSKA Moscow**	2–3 (OT)	10,000
September 19	Kiev, Soviet Union	Palace of Sports	Minnesota North Stars	**Sokol Kiev**	0–5	4,000

=== 1990–91 Super Series ===
In late 1990 and early 1991 three Soviet teams (CSKA Moscow, Dynamo Moscow, Khimik Voskresensk) went on a 21-game tour of North America, playing against every NHL team (the Boston Bruins, the Buffalo Sabres, the Calgary Flames, the Chicago Blackhawks, the Detroit Red Wings, the Edmonton Oilers, the Hartford Whalers, the Los Angeles Kings, the Minnesota North Stars, the Montreal Canadiens, the New Jersey Devils, the New York Islanders, the New York Rangers, the Philadelphia Flyers, the Pittsburgh Penguins, the Quebec Nordiques, the St. Louis Blues, the Toronto Maple Leafs, the Vancouver Canucks, the Washington Capitals, and the original Winnipeg Jets). Games took place in the United States and Canada. The Soviet teams won the series with a record of 12–6–3. Individually, CSKA had a record of 6–1–0, Dynamo had a record of 3–2–2, and Khimik had a record of 3–3–1.

Date	City	Arena	Team	Team	Score
December 3, 1990	Inglewood, United States	Great Western Forum	Khimik Voskresensk	**Los Angeles Kings**	1–5
December 5, 1990	St. Louis, United States	St. Louis Arena	Khimik Voskresensk	**St. Louis Blues**	2–4
December 8, 1990	Uniondale, United States	Nassau Coliseum	Khimik Voskresensk	New York Islanders	2–2
December 10, 1990	Montreal, Canada	Montreal Forum	**Khimik Voskresensk**	Montreal Canadiens	6–3
December 12, 1990	Buffalo, United States	Buffalo Memorial Auditorium	**Khimik Voskresensk**	Buffalo Sabres	5–4 (OT)
December 16, 1990	Boston, United States	Boston Garden	**Khimik Voskresensk**	Boston Bruins	5–2
December 18, 1990	Bloomington, United States	Met Center	Khimik Voskresensk	**Minnesota North Stars**	4–6
December 26, 1990	Detroit, United States	Joe Louis Arena	**CSKA Moscow**	Detroit Red Wings	5–2
December 31, 1990	New York, United States	Madison Square Garden	**CSKA Moscow**	New York Rangers	6–1
January 1, 1991	Toronto, Canada	Maple Leaf Gardens	Dynamo Moscow	**Toronto Maple Leafs**	4–7
January 1, 1991	Chicago, United States	Chicago Stadium	**CSKA Moscow**	Chicago Blackhawks	4–2
January 3, 1991	Hartford, United States	Hartford Civic Center	Dynamo Moscow	Hartford Whalers	0–0
January 4, 1991	Calgary, Canada	Olympic Saddledome	**CSKA Moscow**	Calgary Flames	6–4
January 6, 1991	East Rutherford, United States	Brendan Byrne Arena	Dynamo Moscow	New Jersey Devils	2–2
January 6, 1991	Edmonton, Canada	Northlands Coliseum	CSKA Moscow	**Edmonton Oilers**	2–4
January 8, 1991	Landover, United States	Capital Centre	Dynamo Moscow	**Washington Capitals**	2–3
January 9, 1991	Winnipeg, Canada	Winnipeg Arena	**CSKA Moscow**	Winnipeg Jets	6–4
January 10, 1991	Philadelphia, United States	Spectrum	**Dynamo Moscow**	Philadelphia Flyers	4–1
January 12, 1991	Pittsburgh, United States	Civic Arena	**Dynamo Moscow**	Pittsburgh Penguins	4–3
January 13, 1991	Vancouver, Canada	Pacific Coliseum	**CSKA Moscow**	Vancouver Canucks	4–3 (OT)
January 15, 1991	Quebec City, Canada	Colisée de Québec	**Dynamo Moscow**	Quebec Nordiques	4–1

=== 1992 Chicago Blackhawks–Montreal Canadiens English games ===
In 1992, the Chicago Blackhawks and the Montreal Canadiens played a two-game series in England. Each team won one game.

Date	City	Arena	Team	Team	Score
September 12	London, United Kingdom	Wembley Arena	Chicago Blackhawks	**Montreal Canadiens**	2–3
September 13	London, United Kingdom	Wembley Arena	**Chicago Blackhawks**	Montreal Canadiens	5–4 (OT)

=== 1993 New York Rangers–Toronto Maple Leafs English games ===
In 1993, the New York Rangers and the Toronto Maple Leafs played a two-game series in England. The Rangers won both games.

Date	City	Arena	Team	Team	Score
September 11	London, United Kingdom	Wembley Arena	Toronto Maple Leafs	**New York Rangers**	3–5
September 12	London, United Kingdom	Wembley Arena	**New York Rangers**	Toronto Maple Leafs	3–1

=== 1994 NHL International Challenge in Finland, with the Winnipeg Jets ===
In 1994, the original Winnipeg Jets played in a four-team compressed tournament with HIFK Helsinki, Helsinki Jokerit, and Tappara Tampere in Finland. The Jets won their first game against Tappara, and then HIFK in the final. The tournament had been set up for a final game between Teemu Selänne's old team (Jokerit) and current team (the Jets).

Date	City	Arena	Team	Team	Score
September 9	Helsinki, Finland	Helsinki Ice Hall	**Winnipeg Jets**	Tappara Tampere	8–2
September 11	Helsinki, Finland	Helsinki Ice Hall	**Winnipeg Jets**	HIFK Helsinki	5–3

=== Ninety Nine All Stars Tour ===
During the 1994–95 NHL lockout, Wayne Gretzky formed a team called the Ninety Nine All Stars to play a tour of exhibition games across Europe against various European club teams, in order to stay in game shape and raise money for charity.

Date	City	Arena	Team	Team	Score
December 1	Auburn Hills, United States	The Palace of Auburn Hills	Ninety Nine All Stars	**Detroit Vipers**	3–4
December 3	Helsinki, Finland	Helsinki Ice Hall	**Ninety Nine All Stars**	Jokerit	7–1
December 4	Tampere, Finland	Tampere Ice Stadium	Ninety Nine All Stars	**Ilves**	3–4 (OT)
December 6	Oslo, Norway	Oslo Spektrum	**Ninety Nine All Stars**	Norwegian Spectrum All Stars	6–3
December 9	Stockholm, Sweden	Stockholm Globe Arena	**Ninety Nine All Stars**	Djurgårdens IF	8–3
December 10	Gothenburg, Sweden	Scandinavium	**Ninety Nine All Stars**	Västra Frölunda HC	5–2
December 12	Malmö, Sweden	Malmö Isstadion	Ninety Nine All Stars	**Malmö IF**	5–6 (OT)
December 14	Freiburg, Germany	Franz Siegel Stadion	**Ninety Nine All Stars**	German All Stars	8–5

=== 1998 Buffalo Sabres–Tampa Bay Lightning Austrian tournament ===
In 1998, the Buffalo Sabres and the Tampa Bay Lightning played in a three-game tournament in Austria against the Austrian teams KAC Klagenfurt and VEU Feldkirch. The NHL teams won the tournament with a record of 2–0–0, excluding the NHL-only game.

Date	City	Arena	Team	Team	Score
September 15	Klagenfurt, Austria	Vorarlberghalle	**Tampa Bay Lightning**	VEU Feldkirch	4–1
September 16	Klagenfurt, Austria	Stadthalle	**Buffalo Sabres**	KAC Klagenfurt	5–1
September 18	Innsbruck, Austria	Olympiahalle	**Tampa Bay Lightning**	Buffalo Sabres	5–1

=== 2000 NHL Challenge ===
In 2000, the Vancouver Canucks played a two-game series in Sweden against the Swedish teams Djurgården Stockholm and MoDo Örnsköldsvik. The Canucks won both games.

Date	City	Arena	Team	Team	Score
September 13	Stockholm, Sweden	Stockholm Globe Arena	**Vancouver Canucks**	MoDo Örnsköldsvik	5–2
September 15	Stockholm, Sweden	Stockholm Globe Arena	**Vancouver Canucks**	Djurgården Stockholm	2–1 (OT)

=== 2001 NHL Challenge ===
In 2001, the Colorado Avalanche played a single game in Sweden against the Swedish team Brynäs IF. The Avalanche won. Two more games were scheduled (against Djurgarden and Jokerit), but the tour was cut short due to the September 11 attacks.

Date	City	Arena	Team	Team	Score
September 16	Stockholm, Sweden	Stockholm Globe Arena	**Colorado Avalanche**	Brynäs IF	5–3

=== 2003 NHL Challenge ===
In 2003, the Toronto Maple Leafs played a three-game series in Finland and Sweden against the Finnish team Jokerit Helsinki and the Swedish teams Djurgården Stockholm and Färjestad Karlstad. The Maple Leafs won all games.

Date	City	Arena	Team	Team	Score
September 16	Helsinki, Finland	Hartwall Areena	**Toronto Maple Leafs**	Jokerit Helsinki	5–3
September 18	Stockholm, Sweden	Stockholm Globe Arena	**Toronto Maple Leafs**	Djurgården Stockholm	9–2
September 19	Stockholm, Sweden	Stockholm Globe Arena	**Toronto Maple Leafs**	Färjestad Karlstad	3–0

=== 2004–05 season NHL Worldstars ===
During the 2004–2005 NHL labour dispute, the NHL Worldstars team played.

Date	City	Arena	Team	Team	Score
December 9, 2004	Riga, Latvia	Rigas Sporta Pils	HK Riga 2000	**NHL Worldstars**	2–4
December 12, 2004	Saint Petersburg, Russia	Ice Palace	HV71	**NHL Worldstars**	4–7 (1–2 SO)
December 17, 2004	Jönköping, Sweden	Kinnarps Arena	HV71	**NHL Worldstars**	1–5

=== 2007 NHL Premiere ===
In 2007, the NHL opened its regular season in Europe for the first time. The Anaheim Ducks and the Los Angeles Kings played a two-game series in England that counted towards the 2007–08 regular season. Each team won one game. Prior to this, the Kings played a two-game series in Austria against the Austrian team Red Bull Salzburg and the Swedish team Färjestad Karlstad, winning both.

Date	City	Arena	Team	Team	Score
September 25	Salzburg, Austria	Eisarena Salzburg	**Los Angeles Kings**	Red Bull Salzburg	7–6
September 26	Salzburg, Austria	Eisarena Salzburg	**Los Angeles Kings**	Färjestad Karlstad	3–2
September 29†	London, United Kingdom	The O_{2} Arena	Anaheim Ducks	**Los Angeles Kings**	1–4
September 30†	London, United Kingdom	The O_{2} Arena	Los Angeles Kings	**Anaheim Ducks**	1–4

=== 2008 NHL Premiere ===
In 2008, four teams from the NHL (the New York Rangers, the Ottawa Senators, the Pittsburgh Penguins, and the Tampa Bay Lightning) opened their 2008–09 regular seasons in Europe. The Rangers and the Lightning played a two-game series in the Czech Republic, with the Rangers winning both games. The Senators and the Penguins played a two-game series in Sweden, with each team winning one game. Prior to this, the Rangers played in the inaugural Victoria Cup against Metallurg Magnitogorsk from Russia. All four teams also played against various European teams (Eisbären Berlin from Germany, SC Bern from Switzerland, Slovan Bratislava from Slovakia, Jokerit Helsinki from Finland, and Frölunda Gothenburg from Sweden). The NHL teams won all games.

Date	City	Arena	Team	Team	Score
September 28	Berlin, Germany	O_{2} World	**Tampa Bay Lightning**	Eisbären Berlin	4–1
September 30	Bern, Switzerland	PostFinance Arena	**New York Rangers**	SC Bern	8–1
September 30	Bratislava, Slovakia	Samsung Aréna	**Tampa Bay Lightning**	Slovan Bratislava	3–2 (SO)
October 1	Bern, Switzerland	PostFinance Arena	**New York Rangers**	Metallurg Magnitogorsk	4–3
October 2	Helsinki, Finland	Hartwall Areena	**Pittsburgh Penguins**	Jokerit Helsinki	4–1
October 2	Gothenburg, Sweden	Scandinavium	**Ottawa Senators**	Frölunda Gothenburg	4–1
October 4†	Prague, Czech Republic	O_{2} Arena	**New York Rangers**	Tampa Bay Lightning	2–1
October 4†	Stockholm, Sweden	Stockholm Globe Arena	**Pittsburgh Penguins**	Ottawa Senators	4–3 (OT)
October 5†	Prague, Czech Republic	O_{2} Arena	Tampa Bay Lightning	**New York Rangers**	1–2
October 5†	Stockholm, Sweden	Stockholm Globe Arena	**Ottawa Senators**	Pittsburgh Penguins	3–1

=== 2009 NHL Premiere ===
In 2009, four teams from the NHL (the Chicago Blackhawks, the Detroit Red Wings, the Florida Panthers, and the St. Louis Blues) opened their 2009–10 regular seasons in Europe. The Blackhawks and the Panthers played a two-game series in Finland, with each team winning once. The Red Wings and the Blues played a two-game series in Sweden, with the Blues winning both games. Prior to this, the Blackhawks played in the second annual Victoria Cup against ZSC Lions from Switzerland. All four teams also played against various European teams (Jokerit Helsinki and Tappara Tampere from Finland, HC Davos from Switzerland, and Färjestad BK and Linköpings HC from Sweden). The NHL teams had a record of 4–2–0 against the European teams.

Date	City	Arena	Team	Team	Score
September 28	Tampere, Finland	Tampere Ice Stadium	Florida Panthers	**Tappara Tampere**	2–3 (SO)
September 28	Zurich, Switzerland	Hallenstadion	**Chicago Blackhawks**	HC Davos	9–2
September 29	Linköping, Sweden	Cloetta Center	**St. Louis Blues**	Linköpings HC	6–0
September 29	Zurich, Switzerland	Hallenstadion	Chicago Blackhawks	**ZSC Lions**	1–2
September 30	Helsinki, Finland	Hartwall Areena	**Florida Panthers**	Jokerit Helsinki	4–2
September 30	Karlstad, Sweden	Löfbergs Lila Arena	**Detroit Red Wings**	Färjestad BK	6–2
October 2†	Helsinki, Finland	Hartwall Areena	**Florida Panthers**	Chicago Blackhawks	4–3 (SO)
October 2†	Stockholm, Sweden	Ericsson Globe	Detroit Red Wings	**St. Louis Blues**	3–4
October 3†	Helsinki, Finland	Hartwall Areena	**Chicago Blackhawks**	Florida Panthers	4–0
October 3†	Stockholm, Sweden	Ericsson Globe	**St. Louis Blues**	Detroit Red Wings	5–3

=== 2010 NHL Premiere ===
In 2010, a record six NHL teams (the Boston Bruins, the Carolina Hurricanes, the Columbus Blue Jackets, the Minnesota Wild, the Phoenix Coyotes, and the San Jose Sharks) opened their 2010–11 regular seasons in Europe. The Hurricanes and the Wild played a two-game series in Finland, with the Hurricanes winning both games. The Blue Jackets and the Sharks played a two-game series in Sweden, with each team winning one game. The Bruins and the Coyotes played a two-game series in the Czech Republic, with each team winning one game. Prior to this, all six teams also played against various European teams (Adler Mannheim from Germany, Belfast Giants Selects from Northern Ireland (an all-star team of the EIHL), SKA Saint Petersburg from Russia, Ilves Tampere from Finland, HC Bílí Tygři Liberec from the Czech Republic, Malmö Redhawks from Sweden, and Dinamo Riga from Latvia). The NHL teams had a record of 6–1–0 against the European teams.

Date	City	Arena	Team	Team	Score
October 2	Mannheim, Germany	SAP Arena	**San Jose Sharks**	Adler Mannheim	3–2 (SO)
October 2	Belfast, United Kingdom	Odyssey Centre	**Boston Bruins**	Belfast Giants Selects	5–1
October 4	Saint Petersburg, Russia	Ice Palace	Carolina Hurricanes	**SKA Saint Petersburg**	3–5
October 4	Tampere, Finland	Tampere Ice Stadium	**Minnesota Wild**	Ilves Tampere	5–1
October 5	Liberec, Czech Republic	Tipsport Arena	**Boston Bruins**	HC Bílí Tygři Liberec	7–1
October 5	Malmö, Sweden	Malmö Arena	**Columbus Blue Jackets**	Malmö Redhawks	4–1
October 6	Riga, Latvia	Arena Riga	**Phoenix Coyotes**	Dinamo Riga	3–1
October 7†	Helsinki, Finland	Hartwall Areena	**Carolina Hurricanes**	Minnesota Wild	4–3
October 8†	Helsinki, Finland	Hartwall Areena	Minnesota Wild	**Carolina Hurricanes**	2–1 (SO)
October 8†	Stockholm, Sweden	Ericsson Globe	**San Jose Sharks**	Columbus Blue Jackets	3–2
October 9†	Prague, Czech Republic	O_{2} Arena	**Phoenix Coyotes**	Boston Bruins	5–2
October 9†	Stockholm, Sweden	Ericsson Globe	**Columbus Blue Jackets**	San Jose Sharks	3–2 (OT)
October 10†	Prague, Czech Republic	O_{2} Arena	**Boston Bruins**	Phoenix Coyotes	3–0

=== 2011 NHL Premiere ===
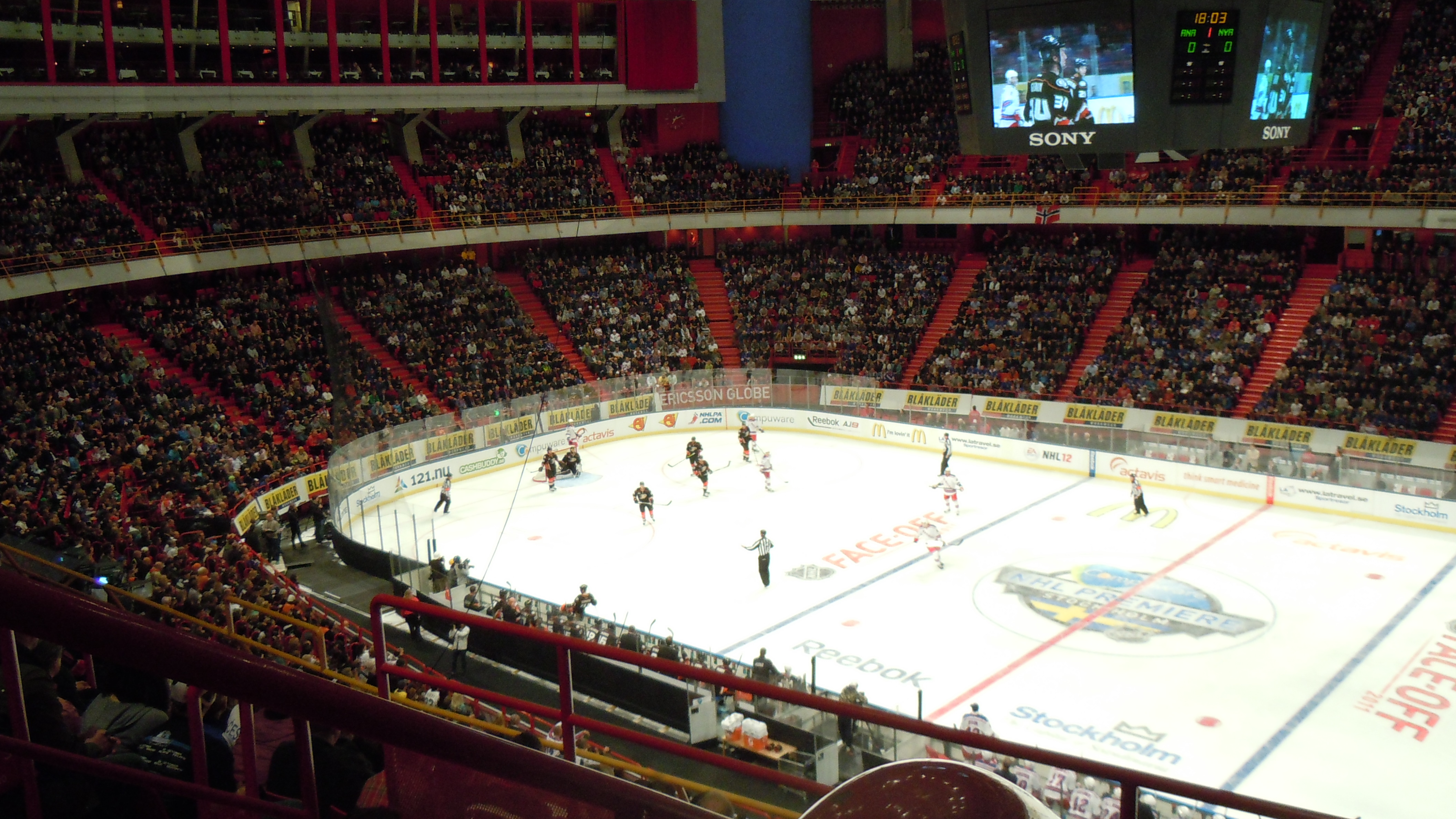
Anaheim vs NY Rangers in Stockholm

In 2011, four teams from the NHL (the Anaheim Ducks, the Buffalo Sabres, the Los Angeles Kings, and the New York Rangers) opened their regular seasons in Europe, marking the fifth straight season of the NHL Premiere games. On October 7, the Ducks and the Sabres played a game in Finland, while the Kings and the Rangers played a game in Sweden. The next day, the Ducks and the Rangers played a game in Sweden, while the Sabres and the Kings played a game in Germany. These teams also played exhibition games against HC Sparta Prague from the Czech Republic, Frölunda HC from Sweden, Slovan Bratislava from Slovakia, EV Zug from Switzerland, Jokerit Helsinki from Finland and Adler Mannheim and Hamburg Freezers from Germany as part of their preseason schedule. The New York Rangers, playing four games in five days in four countries, had a record of 3–1–0 against the European teams. The NHL teams had an overall record of 6–1–0 against the European teams.

Date	City	Arena	Team	Team	Score
September 29	Prague, Czech Republic	Tesla Arena	**New York Rangers**	HC Sparta Prague	2–0
September 30	Gothenburg, Sweden	Scandinavium	**New York Rangers**	Frölunda Gothenburg	4–2
October 2	Bratislava, Slovakia	Slovnaft Arena	**New York Rangers**	Slovan Bratislava	4–1
October 3	Zug, Switzerland	Bossard Arena	New York Rangers	**EV Zug**	4–8
October 4	Helsinki, Finland	Hartwall Areena	**Anaheim Ducks**	Jokerit Helsinki	4–3 (OT)
October 4	Hamburg, Germany	O_{2} World Hamburg	**Los Angeles Kings**	Hamburg Freezers	5–4
October 4	Mannheim, Germany	SAP Arena	**Buffalo Sabres**	Adler Mannheim	8–3
October 7†	Helsinki, Finland	Hartwall Areena	Anaheim Ducks	**Buffalo Sabres**	1–4
October 7†	Stockholm, Sweden	Ericsson Globe	New York Rangers	**Los Angeles Kings**	2–3 (OT)
October 8†	Stockholm, Sweden	Ericsson Globe	New York Rangers	**Anaheim Ducks**	1–2 (SO)
October 8†	Berlin, Germany	O_{2} World	**Buffalo Sabres**	Los Angeles Kings	4–2

=== 2017 NHL Global Series ===
On March 24, 2017, the NHL announced the return of regular season games played outside North America in a new event called the NHL Global Series. The Colorado Avalanche and Ottawa Senators played two regular season games at the Ericsson Globe in Stockholm, Sweden on November 10 and 11, 2017 five days after the trade for Matt Duchene. Unlike the previous regular-season series played in Europe by the NHL, these games were played a month into the regular season rather than the start of it.

Date	City	Arena	Team	Team	Score
November 10†	Stockholm, Sweden	Ericsson Globe	**Ottawa Senators**	Colorado Avalanche	4–3 (OT)
November 11†	Stockholm, Sweden	Ericsson Globe	Colorado Avalanche	**Ottawa Senators**	3–4

=== 2018 NHL Global Series ===
On March 26, 2018, the NHL announced the 2018 slate of NHL Global Series games. The New Jersey Devils and Edmonton Oilers played their regular season opening game in Sweden on October 6, preceded by two exhibition games against European teams. The Florida Panthers and Winnipeg Jets then played two regular season games in Finland on November 1 and 2.

Date	City	Arena	Team	Team	Score
October 1	Bern, Switzerland	PostFinance Arena	**New Jersey Devils**	SC Bern	3–2 (OT)
October 3	Cologne, Germany	Lanxess Arena	**Edmonton Oilers**	Kölner Haie	4–3 (OT)
October 6†	Gothenburg, Sweden	Scandinavium	Edmonton Oilers	**New Jersey Devils**	2–5
November 1†	Helsinki, Finland	Hartwall Arena	Florida Panthers	**Winnipeg Jets**	2–4
November 2†	Helsinki, Finland	Hartwall Arena	Winnipeg Jets	**Florida Panthers**	2–4

=== 2019 NHL Global Series ===
On March 21, 2019, the NHL announced the 2019 lineup of hockey games in Europe. The Chicago Blackhawks and Philadelphia Flyers played their regular season opening game in Prague on October 4, preceded by two exhibition games against European teams. The Blackhawks played Eisbären Berlin on September 29 in Berlin and the Flyers played Lausanne HC in Lausanne on September 30. The Buffalo Sabres and Tampa Bay Lightning then played two regular season games in Sweden on November 8 and 9.

Date	City	Arena	Team	Team	Score
September 29	Berlin, Germany	Mercedes-Benz Arena	**Chicago Blackhawks**	Eisbären Berlin	3–1
September 30	Lausanne, Switzerland	Vaudoise Aréna	Philadelphia Flyers	**Lausanne HC**	3–4
October 4†	Prague, Czech Republic	O_{2} Arena	Chicago Blackhawks	**Philadelphia Flyers**	3–4
November 8†	Stockholm, Sweden	Ericsson Globe	**Tampa Bay Lightning**	Buffalo Sabres	3–2
November 9†	Stockholm, Sweden	Ericsson Globe	Buffalo Sabres	**Tampa Bay Lightning**	3–5

=== 2022 NHL Global Series ===
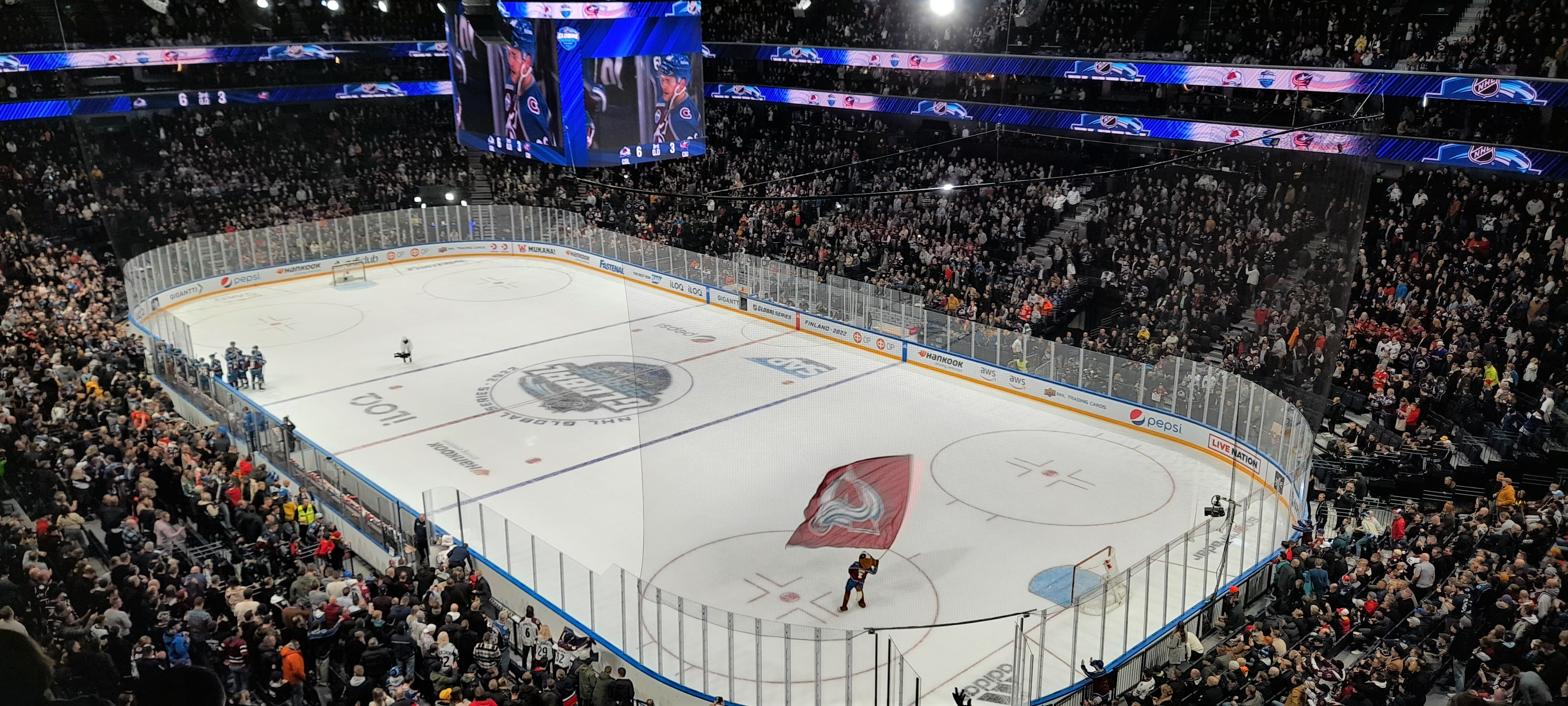
Nokia Arena in Tampere, after the first match of 2022 NHL Global Series between Colorado Avalanche and Columbus Blue Jackets

After a two-year hiatus because of the COVID-19 pandemic, the Global Series returned for the autumn of 2022. The slate of games was revealed on April 22.

The Nashville Predators and San Jose Sharks began the 2022–23 season with two games in Prague. Both teams had preseason games against SC Bern and Eisbären Berlin. The Columbus Blue Jackets and Colorado Avalanche had games in Tampere.

Date	City	Arena	Team	Team	Score
October 3	Bern, Switzerland	PostFinance Arena	**Nashville Predators**	SC Bern	4–3
October 4	Berlin, Germany	Mercedes-Benz Arena	**San Jose Sharks**	Eisbären Berlin	3–1
October 7†	Prague, Czech Republic	O_{2} Arena	San Jose Sharks	**Nashville Predators**	1–4
October 8†	Prague, Czech Republic	O_{2} Arena	**Nashville Predators**	San Jose Sharks	3–2
November 4†	Tampere, Finland	Nokia Arena	Columbus Blue Jackets	**Colorado Avalanche**	6–3
November 5†	Tampere, Finland	Nokia Arena	**Colorado Avalanche**	Columbus Blue Jackets	5–1

=== 2023 NHL Global Series Sweden ===
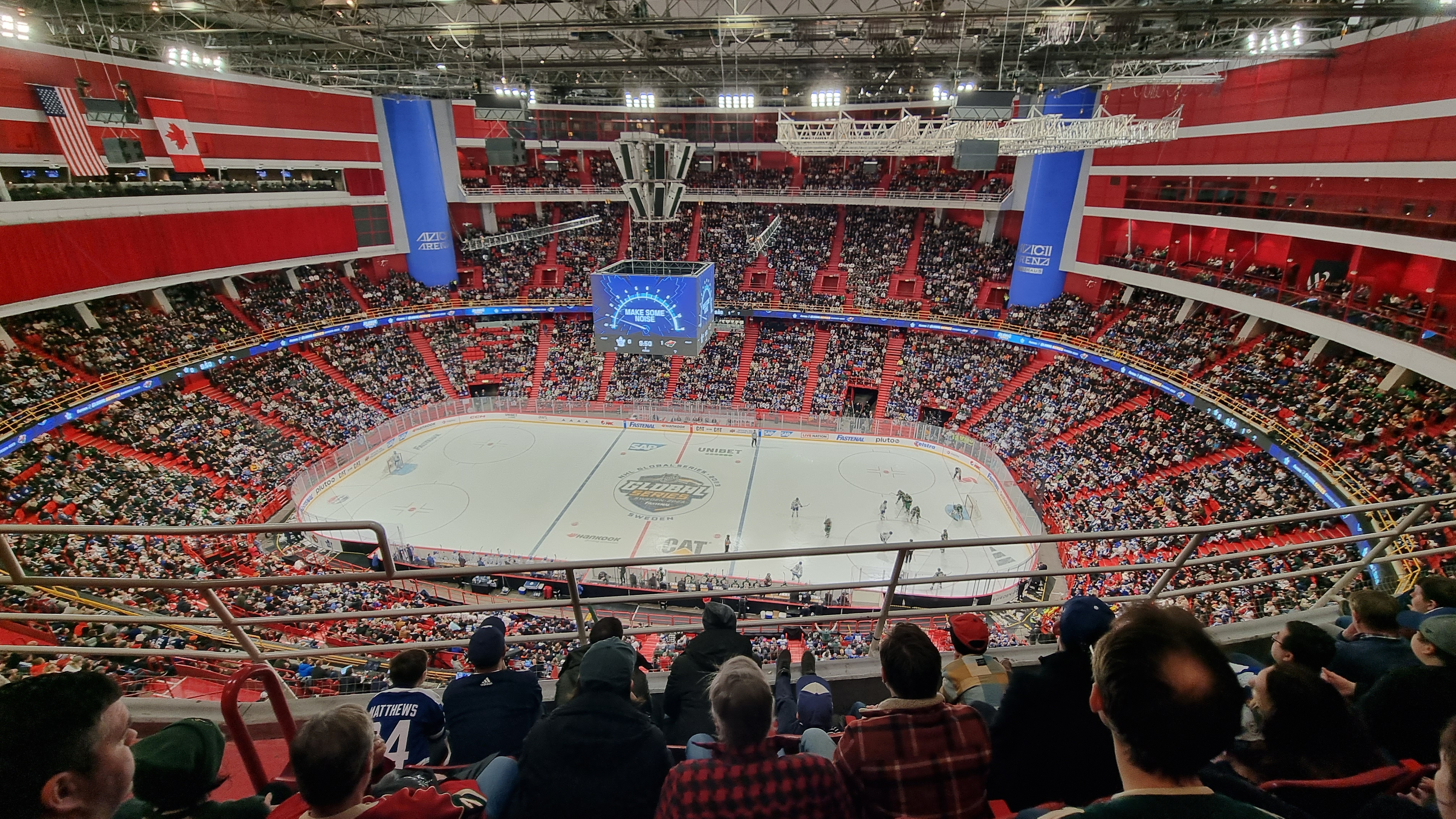
Hockey game in Avicii Arena between Toronto Maple Leafs vs Minnesota Wild in 2023

On April 26, 2023, the NHL announced that the Detroit Red Wings, Minnesota Wild, Ottawa Senators and the Toronto Maple Leafs would contest four regular season games at Avicii Arena in Stockholm, Sweden, on four consecutive days, November 16–19, 2023, as part of the 2023 NHL Global Series Sweden.

Date	City	Arena	Team	Team	Score
November 16†	Stockholm, Sweden	Avicii Arena	Detroit Red Wings	**Ottawa Senators**	4–5 (OT)
November 17†	Stockholm, Sweden	Avicii Arena	**Toronto Maple Leafs**	Detroit Red Wings	3–2
November 18†	Stockholm, Sweden	Avicii Arena	Minnesota Wild	**Ottawa Senators**	1–2 (SO)
November 19†	Stockholm, Sweden	Avicii Arena	**Toronto Maple Leafs**	Minnesota Wild	4–3 (OT)

=== 2024 NHL Global Series ===
On March 12, 2024, the NHL announced that the Buffalo Sabres, New Jersey Devils, Florida Panthers, and Dallas Stars would contest four regular season games in Europe, with the Sabres and Devils opening the season on October 4–5 at O2 Arena in Prague, Czech Republic and the Panthers and Stars playing at Nokia Arena in Tampere, Finland on November 1–2 as part of the 2024 NHL Global Series. In addition, the Sabres played a preseason game on September 27 in Munich, Germany against EHC Red Bull München at their new arena, SAP Garden.

Date	City	Arena	Team	Team	Score
September 27	Munich, Germany	SAP Garden	**Buffalo Sabres**	EHC Red Bull München	5–0
October 4†	Prague, Czech Republic	O_{2} Arena	**New Jersey Devils**	Buffalo Sabres	4–1
October 5†	Prague, Czech Republic	O_{2} Arena	Buffalo Sabres	**New Jersey Devils**	1–3
November 1†	Tampere, Finland	Nokia Arena	**Florida Panthers**	Dallas Stars	6–4
November 2†	Tampere, Finland	Nokia Arena	Dallas Stars	**Florida Panthers**	2–4

=== 2025 NHL Global Series Sweden ===
On March 18, 2025, the NHL announced that the Nashville Predators and Pittsburgh Penguins have been scheduled to play against each other on November 14 and 16, 2025, at Avicii Arena in Stockholm, Sweden.

Date	City	Arena	Team	Team	Score
November 14†	Stockholm, Sweden	Avicii Arena	Pittsburgh Penguins	**Nashville Predators**	1–2 (OT)
November 16†	Stockholm, Sweden	Avicii Arena	Nashville Predators	**Pittsburgh Penguins**	0–4

=== 2026 NHL Global Series ===
On March 13, 2026, the NHL announced that the Ottawa Senators and Chicago Blackhawks have been scheduled to play against each other on December 18 and 20, 2026, at PSD Bank Dome in Düsseldorf, Germany. On March 23, 2026, the NHL announced the Carolina Hurricanes and Seattle Kraken have been scheduled to play against each other on November 12 and 14, 2026 at Veikkaus Arena in Helsinki, Finland.

Date	City	Arena	Team	Team	Score
November 12†	Helsinki, Finland	Veikkaus Arena	**Carolina Hurricanes**	Seattle Kraken	4–1
November 14†	Helsinki, Finland	Veikkaus Arena	Seattle Kraken	**Carolina Hurricanes**	1–5
December 18†	Düsseldorf, Germany	PSD Bank Dome	Chicago Blackhawks	Ottawa Senators	
December 20†	Düsseldorf, Germany	PSD Bank Dome	Ottawa Senators	Chicago Blackhawks	

=== 2027 NHL Global Series ===
On August 20, 2026, the NHL announced that the Boston Bruins and Edmonton Oilers have been scheduled to play at SAP Garden in Munich, Germany and Lanxess Arena in Cologne respectively.

Date	City	Arena	Team	Team	Score
TBD†	Munich, Germany	SAP Garden	TBD	Boston Bruins	
TBD†	Munich, Germany	SAP Garden	Boston Bruins	TBD	
TBD†	Cologne, Germany	Lanxess Arena	TBD	Edmonton Oilers	
TBD†	Cologne, Germany	Lanxess Arena	Edmonton Oilers	TBD	

== Japan ==
=== 1976 Kansas City Scouts–Washington Capitals Japanese tour ===
In 1976, the Kansas City Scouts and the Washington Capitals played a four-game series in Japan. The Capitals won the series with a 3–1–0 record.

Date	City	Arena	Team	Team	Score
April 14	Sapporo, Japan	Makomanai Ice Arena	Kansas City Scouts	**Washington Capitals**	2–5
April 15	Sapporo, Japan	Makomanai Ice Arena	**Washington Capitals**	Kansas City Scouts	6–2
April 17	Tokyo, Japan	Yoyogi National Gymnasium	Kansas City Scouts	**Washington Capitals**	2–6
April 18	Tokyo, Japan	Yoyogi National Gymnasium	**Kansas City Scouts**	Washington Capitals	4–2

=== 1997 Mighty Ducks of Anaheim–Vancouver Canucks Japanese games ===
In 1997, the Mighty Ducks of Anaheim and the Vancouver Canucks played a two-game series in Japan to open the 1997–98 regular season. This marked the first time that games played by NHL teams outside of North America counted in the league standings. Each team won one game.

Date	City	Arena	Team	Team	Score
October 3†	Tokyo, Japan	Yoyogi National Gymnasium	Mighty Ducks of Anaheim	**Vancouver Canucks**	2–3
October 4†	Tokyo, Japan	Yoyogi National Gymnasium	Vancouver Canucks	**Mighty Ducks of Anaheim**	2–3

=== 1998 Calgary Flames–San Jose Sharks Japanese games ===
In 1998, the Calgary Flames and the San Jose Sharks played a two-game series in Japan. The teams tied one game, and the Flames won the other. These games counted in the regular-season standings.

Date	City	Arena	Team	Team	Score
October 9†	Tokyo, Japan	Yoyogi National Gymnasium	San Jose Sharks	Calgary Flames	3–3
October 10†	Tokyo, Japan	Yoyogi National Gymnasium	**Calgary Flames**	San Jose Sharks	5–3

=== 2000 Nashville Predators–Pittsburgh Penguins Japanese games ===
In 2000, the Nashville Predators and the Pittsburgh Penguins played a two-game series in Japan. Each team won one game. As with the previous season-opening series in Japan in 1997 and 1998, these games counted in the regular-season standings.

Date	City	Arena	Team	Team	Score
October 6†	Saitama, Japan	Saitama Super Arena	**Nashville Predators**	Pittsburgh Penguins	3–1
October 7†	Saitama, Japan	Saitama Super Arena	**Pittsburgh Penguins**	Nashville Predators	3–1

== China ==
=== 2017 NHL China Games ===
NHL China Games
- Simplified Chinese: NHL中国运动会
- Traditional Chinese: NHL中國運動會
Transcriptions
Standard Mandarin
- Hanyu Pinyin: NHL Zhōngguó yùndònghuì
Hakka
- Romanization: NHL Chûng-koet yun-thûngfi
Yue: Cantonese
- Yale Romanization: NHL Zùnggwók wàhndùhngkūi
Southern Min
- Hokkien POJ: Tiong-kok ūn-tōnghōe

China Games
- Simplified Chinese: 中国赛
- Traditional Chinese: 中國賽
- Literal meaning: Chinese race
Transcriptions
Standard Mandarin
- Hanyu Pinyin: Zhōngguó sài
Yue: Cantonese
- Yale Romanization: Zùnggwók cói

On March 29, 2017, the NHL announced that the Los Angeles Kings and Vancouver Canucks would play two exhibition games in China in a new event called the NHL China Games. Both teams faced each other in Shanghai, on September 21, 2017, and then in Beijing, on September 23. This was the first time NHL teams played in China.

Date	City	Arena	Team	Team	Score
September 21	Shanghai, China	Mercedes-Benz Arena	Vancouver Canucks	**Los Angeles Kings**	2–5
September 23	Beijing, China	Cadillac Arena	**Los Angeles Kings**	Vancouver Canucks	4–3 (SO)

=== 2018 NHL China Games ===
On May 2, 2018, the NHL announced that the Boston Bruins and Calgary Flames would play two exhibition games in China for the second consecutive year. Both teams faced each other in Shenzhen on September 15, and then in Beijing on September 19.

Date	City	Arena	Team	Team	Score
September 15	Shenzhen, China	Shenzhen Universiade Sports Centre	**Boston Bruins**	Calgary Flames	4–3 (SO)
September 19	Beijing, China	Cadillac Arena	Calgary Flames	**Boston Bruins**	1–3

== Puerto Rico ==
=== 2006 Florida Panthers–New York Rangers Puerto Rican game ===
In 2006, as part of the preseason for the 2006–07 NHL season, the Florida Panthers and the New York Rangers played an exhibition game at the Coliseo de Puerto Rico, San Juan, Puerto Rico. The Rangers won the game.

Date	City	Arena	Team	Team	Score
September 23	San Juan, Puerto Rico	Coliseo de Puerto Rico	Florida Panthers	**New York Rangers**	2–3

== Australia ==
=== 2023 NHL Global Series Melbourne ===
On April 12, 2023, the NHL announced that the Los Angeles Kings and the Arizona Coyotes would contest two preseason games at Rod Laver Arena in Melbourne, Australia on September 23–24, 2023, as part of the 2023 NHL Global Series Melbourne.

Date	City	Arena	Team	Team	Score
September 23	Melbourne, Australia	Rod Laver Arena	Los Angeles Kings	**Arizona Coyotes**	3–5
September 24	Melbourne, Australia	Rod Laver Arena	Arizona Coyotes	**Los Angeles Kings**	2–3

== See also ==
- List of KHL vs NHL games
- List of international ice hockey competitions featuring NHL players
- Gardiner Cup
