= List of KHL vs NHL games =

Although the NHL teams played against Soviet league teams during the Super Series between 1976 and 1991, there were no games between post-Soviet and NHL teams until 2008, when Metallurg Magnitogorsk played against the New York Rangers for the 2008 Victoria Cup. Two years later, in 2010, marked the first time since 1990 that NHL teams played games on post-Soviet ice.

== List of games ==
Date	Venue	KHL team	Score	NHL team	Event
1 October 2008	(Switzerland) PostFinance-Arena, Bern	(Russia) Metallurg Magnitogorsk	3–4	(United States) New York Rangers	2008 Victoria Cup
4 October 2010	(Russia) Ice Palace Saint Petersburg	(Russia) SKA Saint Petersburg	5–3	(United States) Carolina Hurricanes	2010 Compuware NHL Premiere Challenge
6 October 2010	(Latvia) Arena Riga	(Latvia) Dinamo Riga	1–3	(United States) Phoenix Coyotes	2010 Compuware NHL Premiere Challenge
Totals	3 matches	1 win	9–10	2 wins	

== See also ==
- NHL Challenge
- List of international ice hockey competitions featuring NHL players
- List of international games played by NHL teams
- Victoria Cup
