= List of people from Ufa =

Coat of Arms of Ufa

This is a list of notable people who were born or have lived in Ufa, Russia.

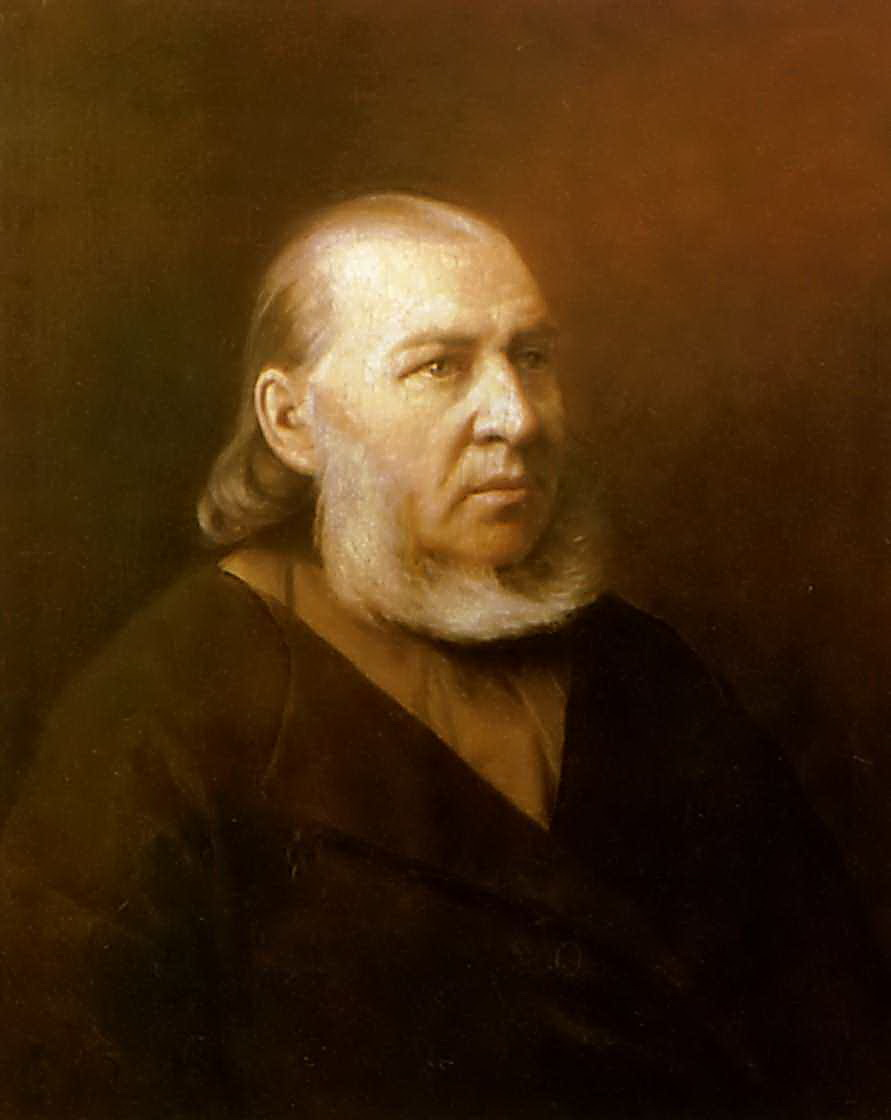
Sergey Aksakov (1791–1859)

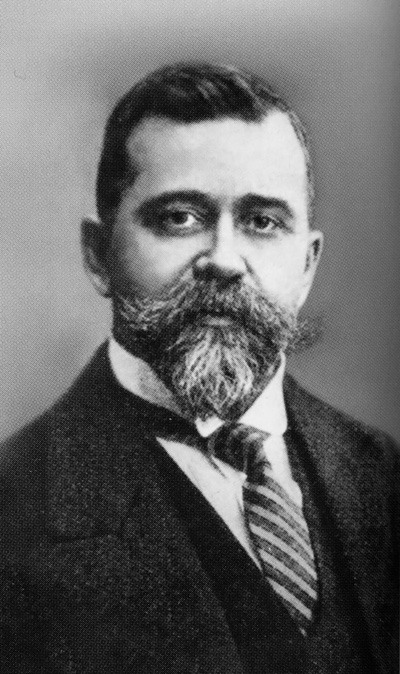
Ilya Bondarenko (1870–1947)

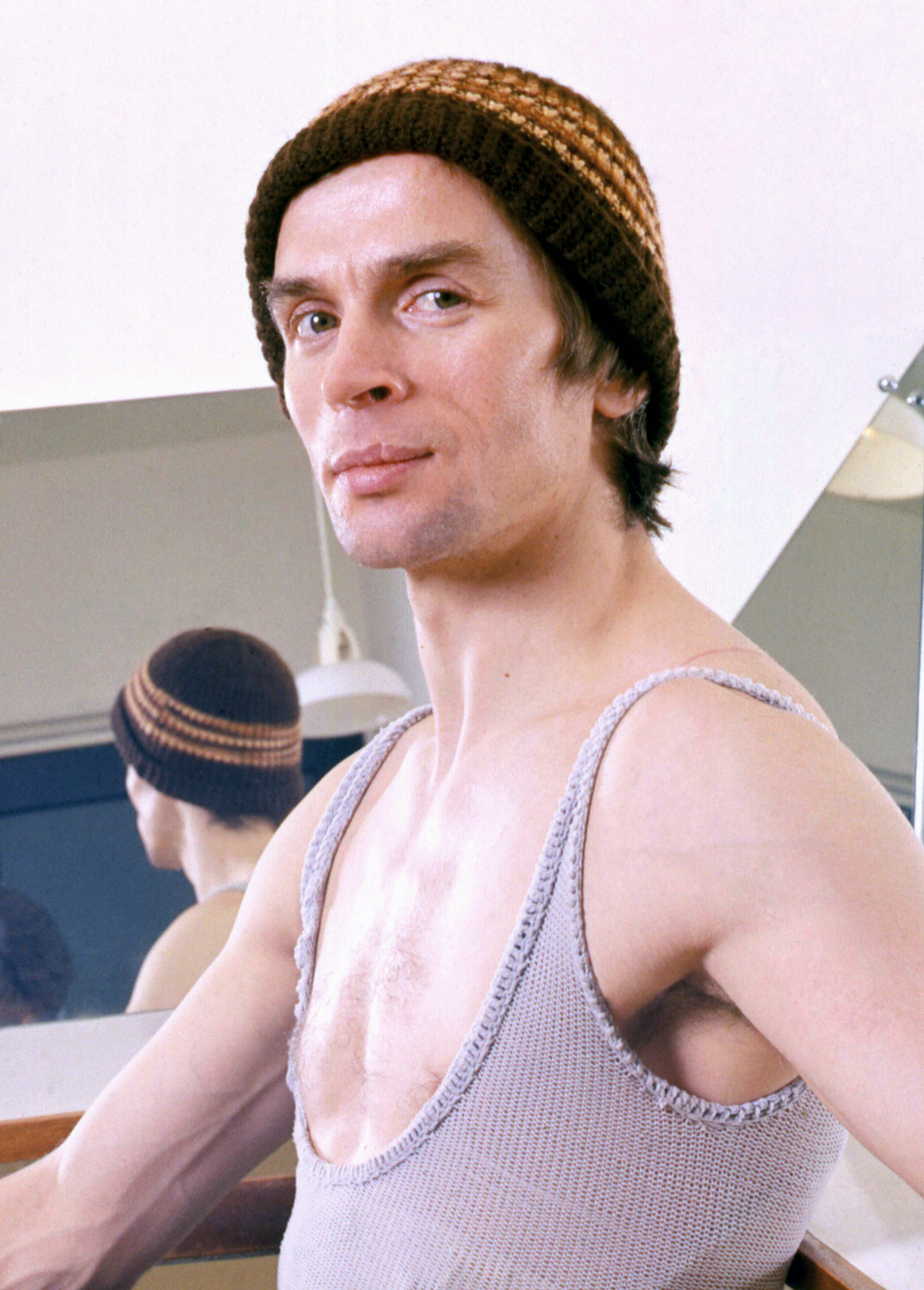
Rudolf Nureyev (1938–1993)

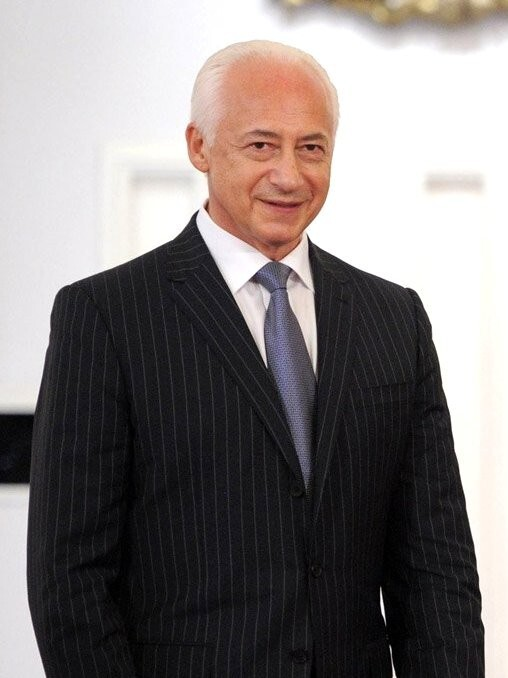
Vladimir Spivakov (born 1944)

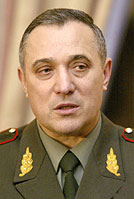
Anatoly Kvashnin (1946–2022)

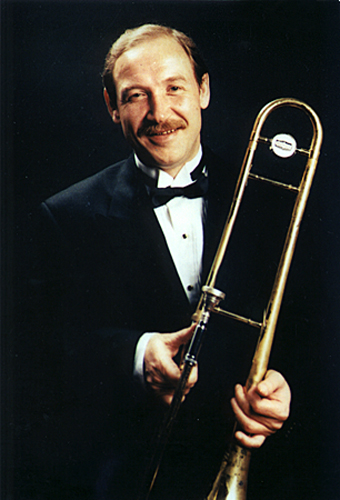
Viatcheslav Nazarov (1952–1996)

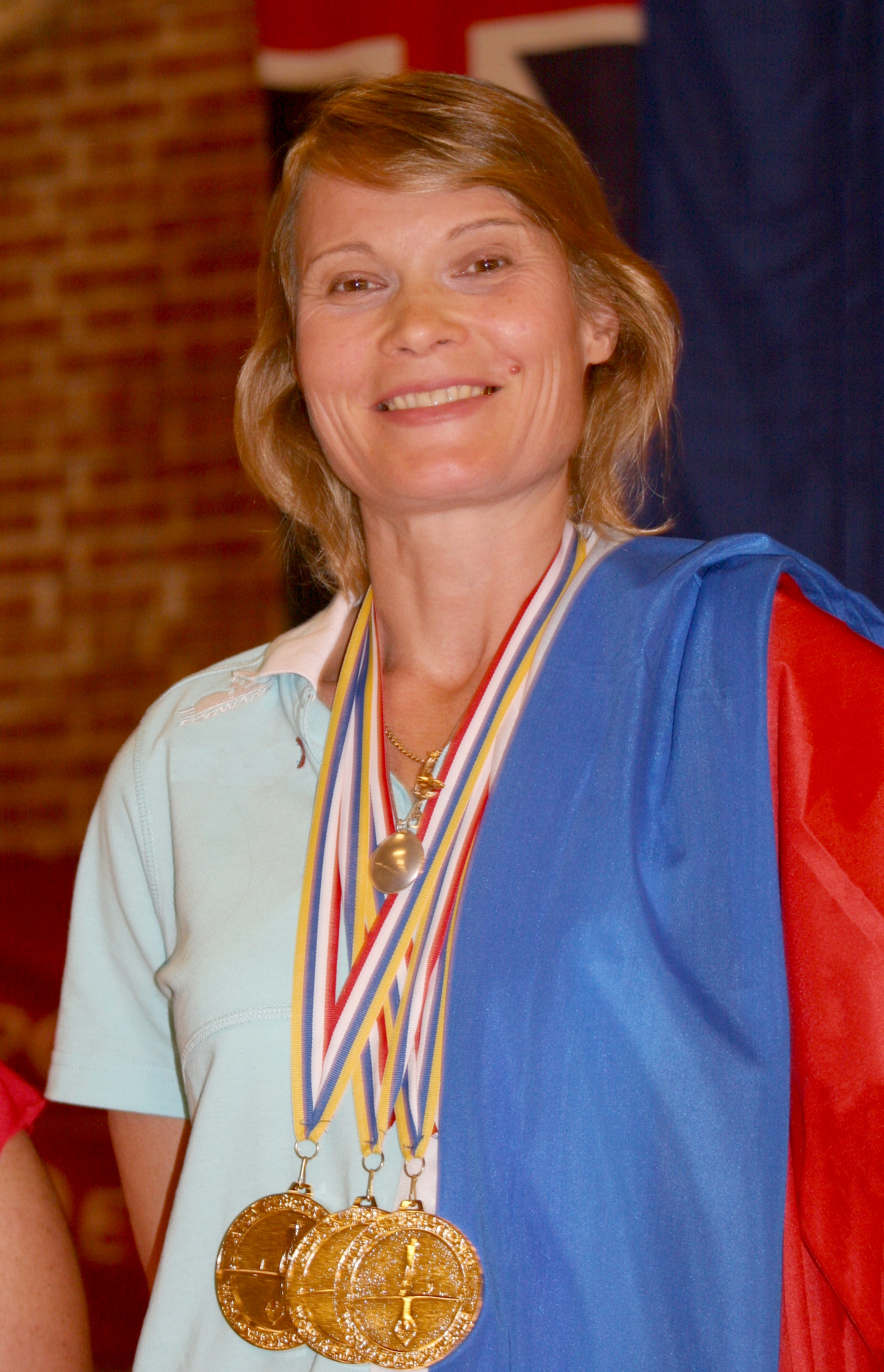
Natalia Molchanova (1962–2015)

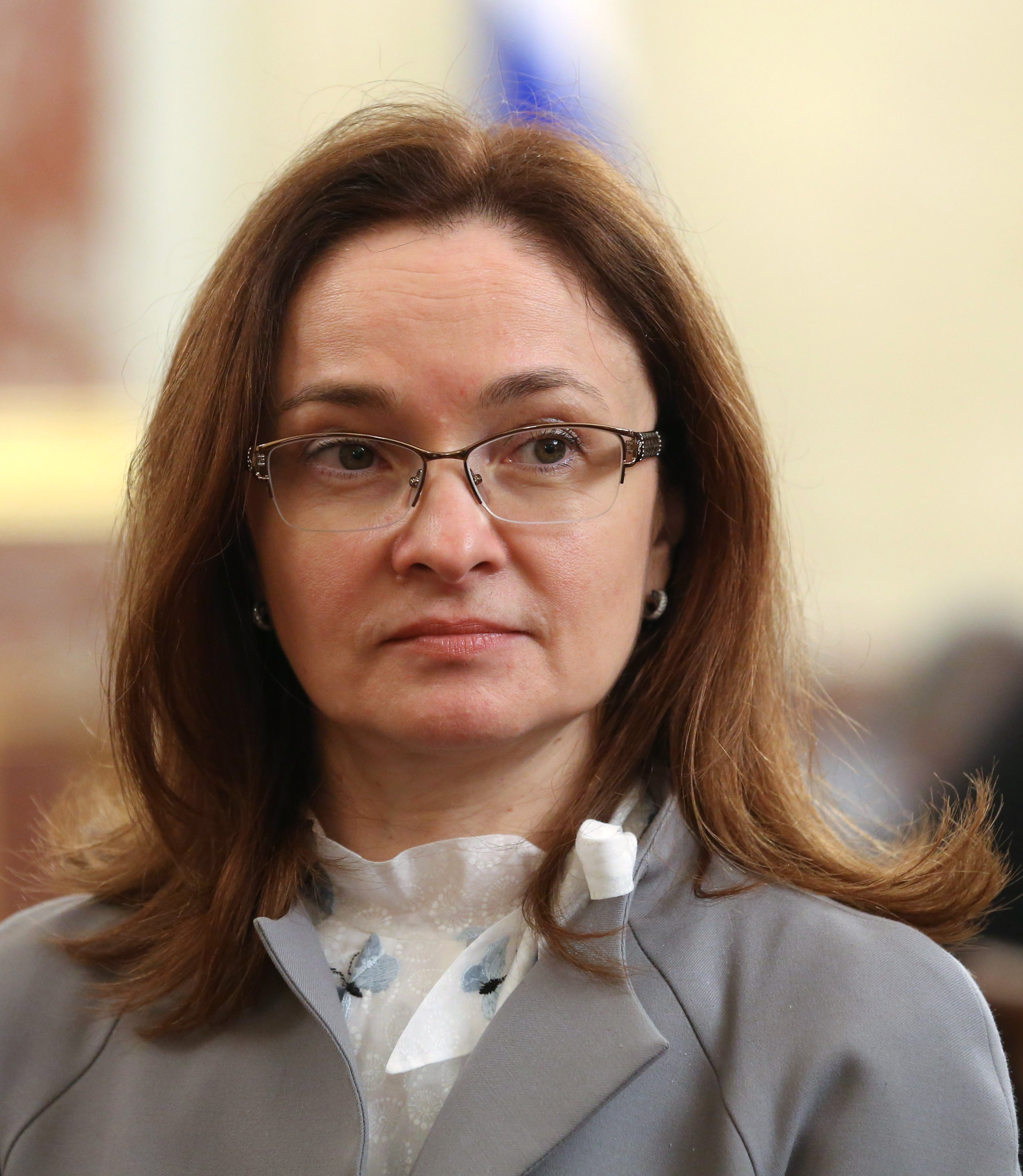
Elvira Nabiullina (born 1963)

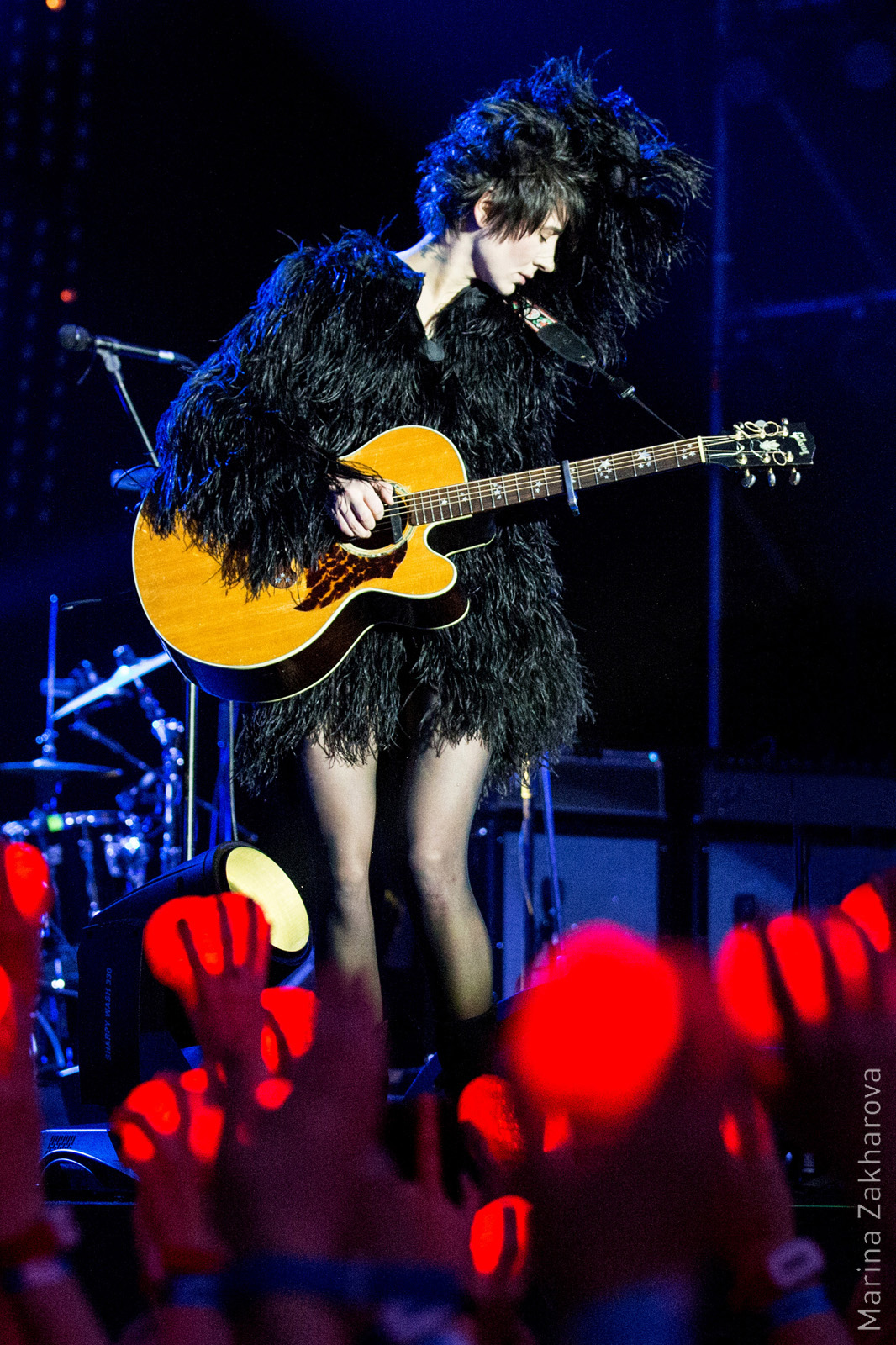
Zemfira (born 1976)

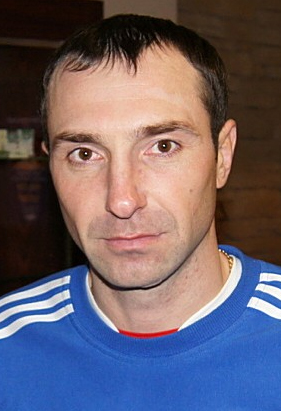
Dimitry Vassiliev (born 1979)

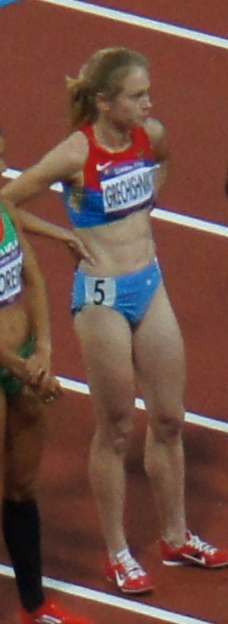
Yelizaveta Grechishnikova (born 1983)

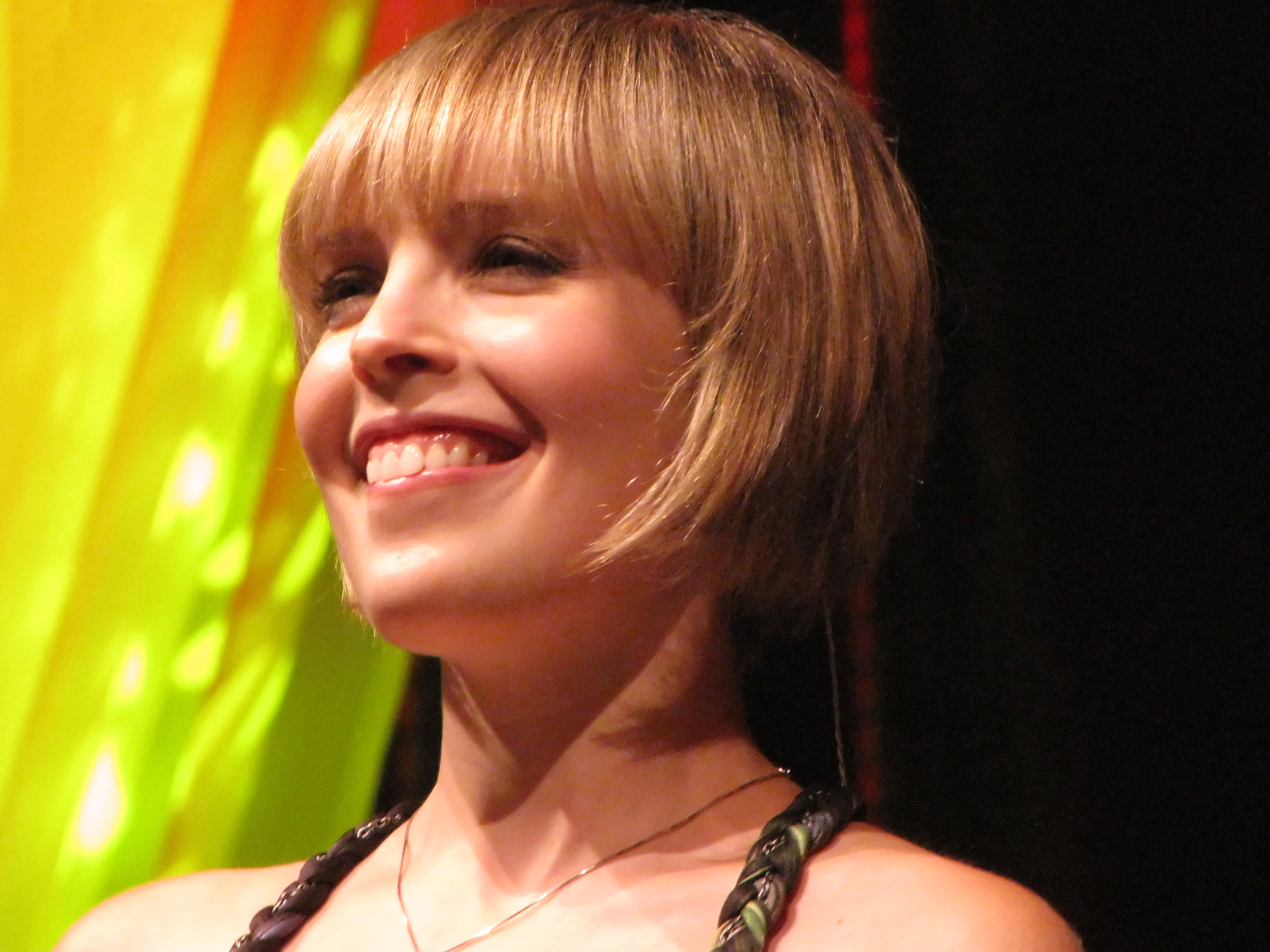
Sophie Milman (born 1984)

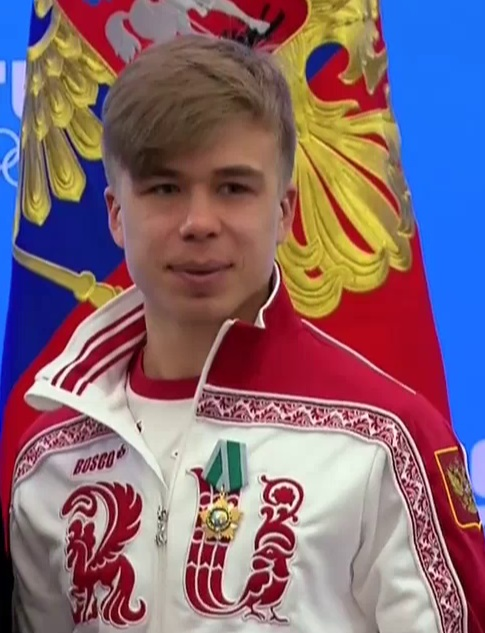
Semion Elistratov (born 1990)

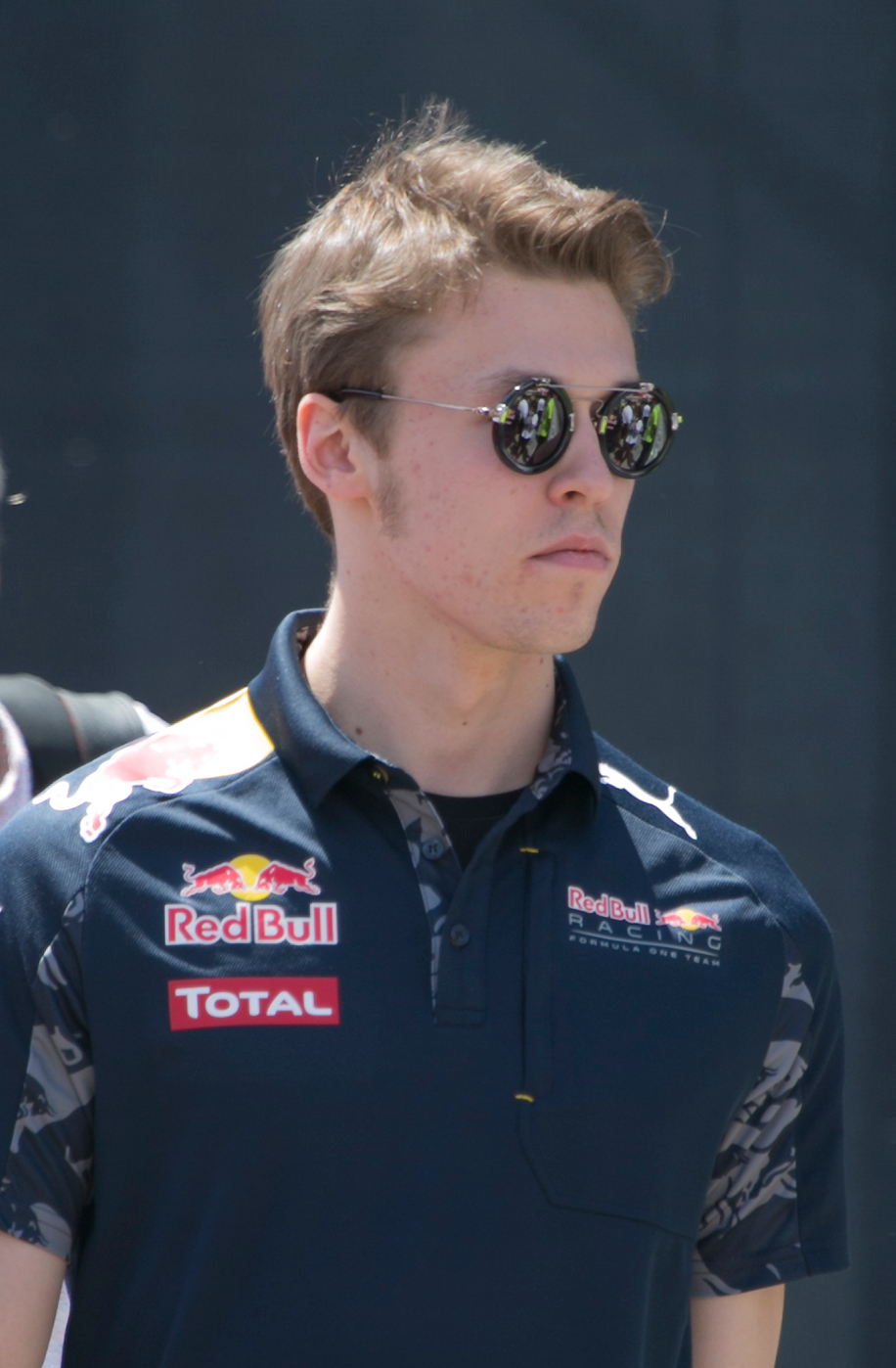
Daniil Kvyat (born 1994)

== Born in Ufa ==
=== 18th century ===
==== 1701–1800 ====
- Sergey Aksakov (1791–1859), Russian literary figure remembered for his semi-autobiographical tales of family life, as well as his books on hunting and fishing

=== 19th century ===
==== 1801–1900 ====
- Nikolay Zhukovsky (1833–1895), Russian revolutionary and narodnik
- Georgiy Afanasyev (1848–1925), Russian and Ukrainian historian, politician and diplomat
- Vera Timanova (1855–1942), Russian pianist
- Mikhail Nesterov (1862–1942), major representative of religious symbolism in Russian art
- Yekaterina Kuskova (1869–1958), Russian economist, journalist and politician
- Ilya Bondarenko (1870–1947), Russian-Soviet architect, historian and preservationist
- Ivan Meshchaninov (1883–1967), Soviet linguist and ethnographer
- Alexander Serebrovsky (1884–1938), Russian revolutionary and Soviet petroleum and mining engineer nicknamed the "Soviet Rockefeller"
- Yuri Rall (1890-1948), Soviet naval officer, vice-admiral
- Mirsaid Sultan-Galiev (1892–1940), Tatar Bolshevik

=== 20th century ===
==== 1901–1920 ====
- Boris Gudz (1902–2006), the last survivor of the October Revolution, a veteran of the Russian Civil War and an OGPU security agent
- Jarosław Skulski (1907–1977), Russian-born Polish film and theatre actor
- Elizaveta Mukasei (1912–2009), Soviet spy codenamed Elza
- Viktor Khokhryakov (1913–1986), Soviet Russian film actor, theater actor and director
- Natalya Kovshova (1920–1942), female Soviet sniper who fought in the Great Patriotic War

==== 1921–1940 ====
- Liya Shakirova (1921–2015), Soviet and Russian linguist
- Grigory Svirsky (1921–2016), Russian-Canadian writer
- Lena Mukhina (1924–1991), Russian woman, who wrote her experiences as teenage schoolgirl during the Siege of Leningrad in her diary, pouring out her hopes and fears
- Georgy Mosolov (1926–2018), Soviet test pilot and Hero of the Soviet Union
- Igor Plekhanov (1933–2007), Soviet speedway rider
- Renart Suleymanov (born 1937), Russian sport shooter

==== 1941–1950 ====
- Sergei Dovlatov (1941–1990), Russian and American journalist and writer
- Serhiy Komisarenko (born 1943), Ukrainian scientist, politician, and diplomat
- Vladimir Spivakov (born 1944), Russian conductor and violinist
- Andrei Boltnev (1946–1995), Soviet and Russian actor
- Anatoly Kvashnin (1946–2022), Chief of the Russian General Staff from 1997 to 2004 and Hero of the Russian Federation

==== 1951–1960 ====
- Viktor Anokhin (born 1951), Soviet Russian sprint athlete
- Viatcheslav Nazarov (1952–1996), Russian world-class jazz trombonist, pianist, and vocalist
- Zilya Valeeva (born 1952), politician in Republic of Tatarstan in Russia
- Oleg Vyugin (born 1952), Head of the Federal Financial Markets Service of Russia
- Valery Limasov (born 1955), Soviet Russian boxer
- Sergey Veremeenko (born 1955), Russian businessman
- Vladimir Vinogradov (1955–2008), owner and president of Inkombank
- Irek Gimayev (born 1957), Soviet ice hockey player
- Arthur Alexandrovich Rean (born 1957), psychologist
- Igor Sokolov (born 1958), Soviet sport shooter and Olympic champion

==== 1961–1970 ====
- Ural Rakhimov (born 1961), Russian businessman of Bashkir ethnicity
- Ramil Yuldashev (born 1961), Ukrainian ice hockey winger
- Natalia Molchanova (1962–2015), Russian champion free diver, multiple world record holder and the former president of the Russian Free Dive Federation
- Svetlana Zainetdinova (born 1962), Estonian chess Woman FIDE Master
- Ildar Garifullin (1963–2023), Soviet/Russian Nordic combined skier
- Elvira Nabiullina (born 1963), Tatar born-Russian economist and head of the Central Bank of Russia
- Eugene Shvidler (born 1964), Soviet-born businessman
- Anatoly Emelin (born 1964), Soviet/Russian ice hockey player
- Rustem Dautov (born 1965), German chess Grandmaster of Tatar origin
- Anvar Ibragimov (1965–2023), Soviet fencer
- Igor Kravchuk (born 1966), Russian ice hockey defenceman
- Igor Nikitin (1966–2013), Russian ice hockey player and coach
- Vadym Rubel (born 1966), Ukrainian historian
- Alexander Semak (born 1966), Russian professional ice hockey centre
- Ratmir Timashev (born 1966), Russian IT entrepreneur
- Pavel Muslimov (born 1967), Russian biathlete
- Veniamin Tayanovich (born 1967), Russian freestyle swimmer
- Oleg Yeryomin (born 1967), Russian football player
- Andrei Cherkasov (born 1970), Soviet and Russian professional tennis player

==== 1971–1975 ====
- Svetlana Gladysheva (born 1971), Russian alpine skier
- Ildar Pomykalov (born 1971), Russian Paralympian athlete
- Vadim Milov (born 1972), Swiss grandmaster of chess
- Denis Afinogenov (born 1974), Russian professional ice hockey player
- Andrey Gubin (born 1974), Russian pop-singer, poet, composer, and record producer
- Albert Lukmanov (born 1974), Russian professional football player
- Vadim Sharifijanov (born 1975), Russian professional ice hockey right winger
- Nikolai Tsulygin (born 1975), Russian professional ice hockey player

==== 1976–1980 ====
- Ildar Abdrazakov (born 1976), Russian bass opera singer
- Alexei Seliverstov (born 1976), Russian bobsledder
- Zemfira (born 1976), Russian rock musician
- Konstantin Fomichev (born 1977), Russian sprint canoeist
- Arthur Khamidulin (born 1977), Russian ski jumper
- Evgeni Petrov (born 1978), Russian professional road bicycle racer
- Andrei Zyuzin (born 1978), Russian professional ice hockey player
- Denis Khlystov (born 1979), Russian professional ice hockey centre
- Andrei Sidyakin (born 1979), Russian ice hockey forward
- Dimitry Vassiliev (born 1979), Russian ski jumper
- Artem Derepasko (born 1980), Russian professional tennis player
- Ruslan Nurtdinov (born 1980), Russian professional ice hockey winger

==== 1981–1985 ====
- Ildar Fatchullin (born 1982), Tatar ski jumper
- Evdokia Gretchichnikova (born 1982), Russian modern pentathlete
- Sergey Maslennikov (born 1982), Russian Nordic combined skier
- Evgueni Nourislamov (born 1982), Russian professional ice hockey defenceman
- Alexander Seluyanov (born 1982), Russian professional ice hockey defenceman
- Yelizaveta Grechishnikova (born 1983), Russian long-distance runner
- Dmitri Makarov (born 1983), Russian professional ice hockey winger
- Nikita Shchitov (born 1983), Russian professional ice hockey defenceman
- Igor Volkov (born 1983), Russian professional ice hockey player
- Ruslan Abdrakhmanov (born 1984), Russian professional ice hockey player
- Sophie Milman (born 1984), Russian-born jazz vocalist who lives in Canada
- Artem Bulyansky (born 1985), Russian professional ice hockey forward
- Renal Ganeyev (born 1985), Russian fencer, who has won bronze Olympic medal in the team foil competition at the 2004 Summer Olympics in Athens
- Konstantin Makarov (born 1985), Russian professional ice hockey player

==== 1986–1990 ====
- Elena Chalova (born 1987), professional Russian tennis player
- Alexander Loginov (born 1987), Russian professional ice hockey defenceman
- Oleksander Zhyrnyi (born 1987), Ukrainian biathlete of Russian origins
- Andrei Zubarev (born 1987), Russian professional ice hockey player
- Dmitri Zyuzin (born 1987), Russian professional ice hockey player
- Nikita Davydov (born 1988), Russian professional ice hockey goaltender
- Artyom Gordeyev (born 1988), Russian professional ice hockey player
- Lyaysan Rayanova (born 1989), Russian alpine skier
- Vladimir Sokhatsky (born 1989), Russian professional ice hockey goaltender
- Semion Elistratov (born 1990), Russian short-track speed-skater, the 2014 Olympic champion in the 5000m relay
- Pavel Ilyashenko (born 1990), modern pentathlete from Kazakhstan
- Rafael Khakimov (born 1990), Russian ice hockey goaltender
- Yuri Kirillov (born 1990), Russian professional footballer
- Kseniya Makeyeva (born 1990), Russian female handball player

==== 1991–2000 ====
- Anton Babikov (born 1991), Russian biathlete
- Ilmir Hazetdinov (born 1991), Russian ski jumper of Tatar descent
- Anton Koprivitsa (born 1991), Russian snowboarder
- Ranya Mordanova (born 1991), Russian fashion model
- Alexander Pankov (born 1991), Russian professional ice hockey player
- Ernest Yahin (born 1991), Russian Nordic combined skier
- Sergei Yemelin (born 1991), Russian professional ice hockey player
- Artyom Gareyev (born 1992), Russian professional ice hockey player
- Ildar Isangulov (born 1992), Russian ice hockey defenceman
- Dmitry Migunov (born 1992), Russian short-track speed-skater
- Albert Sharipov (born 1993), Russian professional football player
- Alexei Vasilevsky (born 1993), Russian ice hockey defenceman
- Eduard Gimatov (born 1994), Russian ice hockey player
- Bulat Khayernasov (born 1994), Russian football forward
- Daniil Kvyat (born 1994), Russian auto racing driver
- Igor Bezdenezhnykh (born 1996), Russian professional football player
- Ivan Dryomin (born 1997), Russian rap artist
- Mikhail Vorobyev (born 1997), Russian ice hockey forward
- Morgenshtern (born 1998), Russian rapper
- Igor Diveyev (born 1999), Russian professional football player

== Lived in Ufa ==
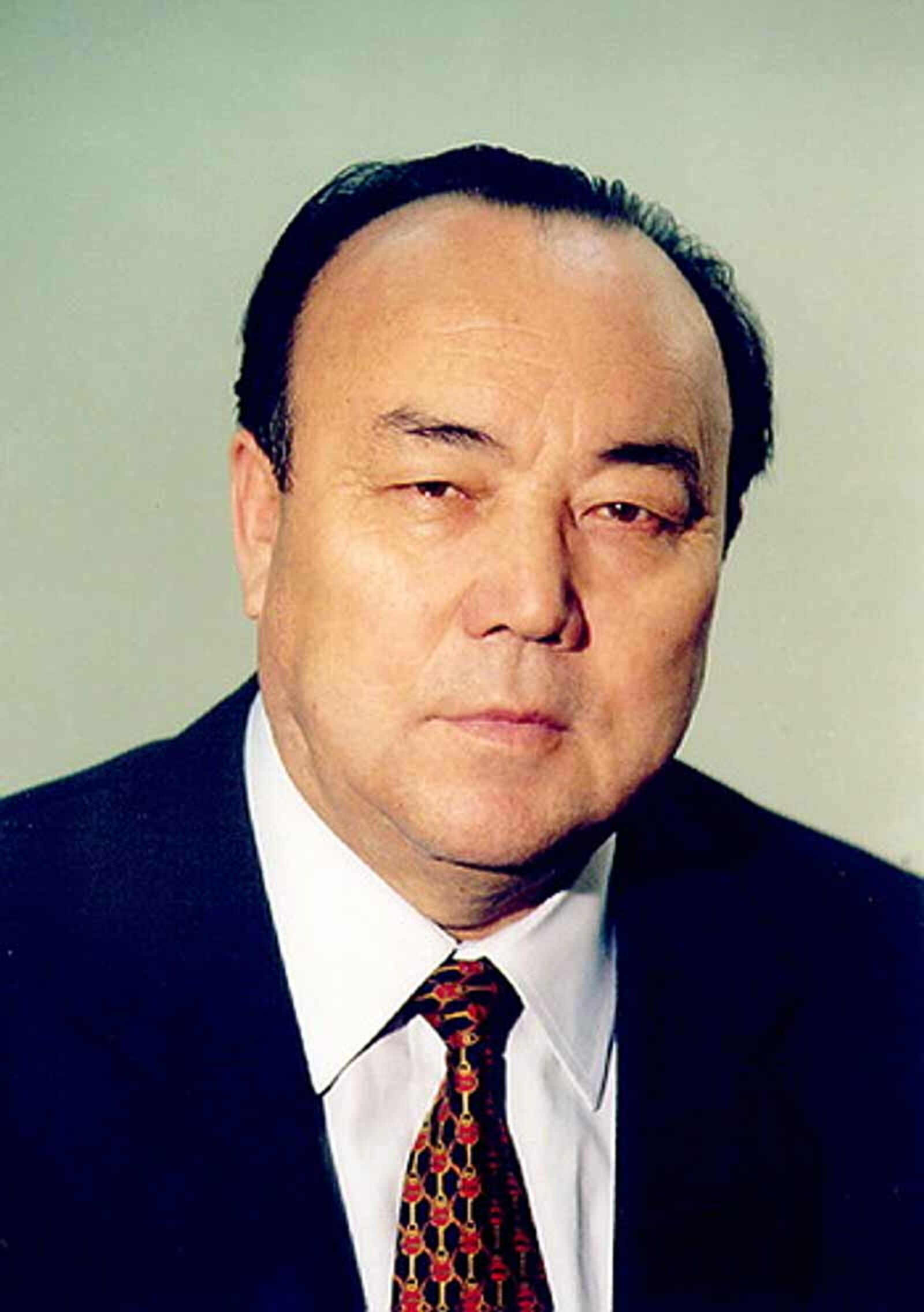
Murtaza Rakhimov (1934–2023)

- Dmitry Shuvayev (1854–1937), Russian military leader, Infantry General
- Valerian Albanov (1881–1919), Russian navigator; born in Voronezh and was raised by his uncle in the city of Ufa
- Murtaza Rakhimov (1934–2023), Russian politician of Bashkir ethnicity who served as the first President of Bashkortostan, a republic within Russia, from 1993 to 2010
- Rudolf Nureyev (1938–1993), Soviet dancer of ballet and modern dance
- Yuri Shevchuk (born 1957), Soviet and Russian singer/songwriter

== Died in Ufa ==
- Joseph Le Brix (1899–1931), French aviator and a capitain de corvette (lieutenant commander) in the French Navy

== See also ==
- List of Russian people
- List of Russian-language poets
