= 2008–09 Champions Hockey League =

- League: Champions Hockey League (2008–09)
- Sport: Ice hockey
- Duration: 8 October 2008 – 28 January 2009
- Number of teams: 14 (12 in group stage)
- Season MVP: (Finland) Ari Sulander (ZSC)
- Top scorer: (Canada) Jean-Guy Trudel (ZSC)

Finals
- Champions: (Switzerland) ZSC Lions
- Runners-up: (Russia) Metallurg Magnitogorsk

Seasons
- ← none none →

The 2008–09 Champions Hockey League was the only season of the Champions Hockey League (2008–09), an IIHF-organized ice hockey tournament for the best club teams in Europe. The season was played with 12 teams from seven countries (two teams each from Russia, Czech Republic, Sweden and Finland, one team each from Switzerland, Germany and Slovakia and a 12th team from one of these three countries, determined in a qualification tournament). Every participating team was guaranteed an appearance fee of 300,000 euro and the winner received 1,000,000 euro. Prize money was also awarded for winning group stage matches (50,000 euro), for the semi-final appearance (200,000 euro) and for the other finalist (500,000 euro). In total, 10 million euros were distributed, the largest prize sum ever in a European hockey club competition. The ZSC Lions from Switzerland won the competition by beating Russia's Metallurg Magnitogorsk in the finals.

In December 2013, the IIHF officially announced that they had launched a new tournament with the same name, born out of the European Trophy, starting in the 2014–15 season.

== Participating teams ==
The 2008–09 edition of the Champions Hockey League was played with twelve teams from Europe's top seven hockey leagues. Ten teams qualified directly for the group stage due to their performances in the domestic leagues. The field was completed with the winner of last season's Champions Cup and one team from the qualifying tournament. The tables below lists these teams together with the reasons for qualifying.

=== Directly qualified for group stage ===
(Russia)	Metallurg Magnitogorsk	Magnitogorsk, Russia	2008 IIHF European Champions Cup winner
(Russia)	Salavat Yulaev Ufa	Ufa, Russia	Russian Superleague champion
(Finland)	Kärpät	Oulu, Finland	Finnish SM-liiga champion
(Finland)	Espoo Blues	Espoo, Finland	Finnish SM-liiga playoff finalist
(Czech Republic)	HC Slavia Praha	Prague, Czech Republic	Czech Extraliga champion
(Czech Republic)	HC České Budějovice	České Budějovice, Czech Republic	Czech Extraliga regular-season winner
(Sweden)	HV71	Jönköping, Sweden	Swedish Elitserien champion
(Sweden)	Linköpings HC	Linköping, Sweden	Swedish Elitserien regular-season runner-up
(Slovakia)	HC Slovan Bratislava	Bratislava, Slovakia	Slovak Extraliga champion
(Switzerland)	ZSC Lions	Zürich, Switzerland	Swiss National League A champion
(Germany)	Eisbären Berlin	Berlin, Germany	Deutsche Eishockey Liga champion

Note: Because the Swedish regular-season winner (HV71) also won the play-offs, Linköpings HC as the runner-up of the regular-season participated.

=== Participating in qualifying tournament ===
(Slovakia)	HC Košice	Košice, Slovakia	Slovak Extraliga regular-season runner-up
(Switzerland)	SC Bern	Berne, Switzerland	Swiss National League A regular-season winner
(Germany)	Sinupret Ice Tigers	Nuremberg, Germany	Deutsche Eishockey Liga regular-season winner

Note: Because the Slovak regular-season winner (Slovan Bratislava) also won the play-offs, HC Košice as the runner-up of the regular-season participated in the qualifying tournament.

== Qualifying tournament ==
Three teams played a qualifying tournament on 12–14 September in Nuremberg, Germany. A win was awarded 3 points, 0 points for a loss. SC Bern won the tournament and qualified as the second team from Switzerland for the group stage of the Champions Hockey League. Bern's Ramzi Abid was the top scorer of the tournament with 3 goals and 1 assist. The matches were attended by an average of 3,426 spectators.

Team	GP	W	SOW	SOL	L	GF	GA	PTS
(Switzerland) SC Bern	2	2	0	0	0	9	5	6
(Germany) Sinupret Ice Tigers	2	1	0	0	1	6	7	3
(Slovakia) HC Košice	2	0	0	0	2	7	10	0

September 12, 2008; 19:30 CET	Sinupret Ice Tigers (Germany)	1–4 (0–0, 1–1, 0–3)	(Switzerland) SC Bern	Nuremberg Arena, Nuremberg; Attendance: 7,658

Game reference
A. Savage (ES) 35:52 / Goals / 30:07 (PP) R. Abid; 41:13 (ES) P. Bärtschi; 50:52 (ES) S. Gamache; 59:41 (EN) S. Bordeleau

September 13, 2008; 18:30 CET	SC Bern (Switzerland)	5–4 (2–0, 2–3, 1–1)	(Slovakia) HC Košice	Nuremberg Arena, Nuremberg; Attendance: 1,859

Game reference
L. Goren (PP) 06:59; C. Dubé (PP) 10:49; P. Bärtschi (ES) 28:23; R. Abid (ES) 35:17; R. Abid (PP) 52:03 / Goals / 26:38 (PP) J. Faith; 27:09 (ES) M. Simurda; 28:43 (ES) M. Simurda; 44:26 (ES) J. Faith

September 14, 2008; 18:30 CET	HC Košice (Slovakia)	3–5 (0–2, 2–2, 1–1)	(Germany) Sinupret Ice Tigers	Nuremberg Arena, Nuremberg; Attendance: 3,373

Game reference
J. Kmiť (PP) 24:27; M. Miklík (ES) 28:22; J. Sýkora (ES) 50:19 / Goals / 01:31 (PP) B. Leeb; 15:30 (PP) M. Periard; 24:46 (ES) B. Leeb; 34:56 (PP) C. Laflamme; 48:03 (PP) P. Fical

== Group stage ==
Location of teams of the group stage in 2008–09 Champions Hockey League.
Yellow: Group A, Red: Group B, Blue: Group C, Green: Group D.

The draw for the group stage took place on Friday, 25 April 2008 in Zürich, Switzerland. The twelve teams were drawn into groups of three. Each group played a double round-robin. If the games were decided after 60 minutes, the winner was awarded 3 points and the loser 0 points. In case of a tie, both teams got 1 point and a penalty shoot-out was staged with the winner being awarded a second point. The best team of each group – the two Russian teams Ufa and Magnitogorsk, Espoo from Finland and the ZSC Lions from Switzerland – advanced to the semi-finals.

=== Group A ===
Eisbären Berlin played their two home games at the new O2 World in Berlin in front of 13,000 and 13,500 spectators, respectively, a Champions Hockey League record. Magnitogorsk qualified for the semi-finals on gameday 5 after winning their first three games. Metallurg's Jan Marek was the top scorer in group A with 2 goals and 5 assists.

Team	GP	W	OTW	OTL	L	GF	GA	PTS
(Russia) Metallurg Magnitogorsk	4	3	0	0	1	11	5	9
(Germany) Eisbären Berlin	4	2	1	0	1	10	10	8
(Finland) Kärpät	4	0	0	1	3	5	11	1

October 8, 2008; 19:30 CET	Eisbären Berlin (Germany)	3–2 (1–1, 1–0, 1–1)	(Finland) Kärpät	O2 World, Berlin; Attendance: 13,000

Game reference
T. Mulock (ES) 01:35; A. Rankel (ES) 20:52; D. Pederson (ES) 40:34 / Goals / 04:33 (PP) I. Mikkola; 47:45 (ES) T. Koivisto

October 22, 2008; 20:30 EET	Kärpät (Finland)	0–2 (0–0, 0–1, 0–1)	(Russia) Metallurg Magnitogorsk	Oulun Energia Areena, Oulu; Attendance: 6,614

Game reference
Goals / 34:30 (PP) J. Marek; 43:46 (PP) V. Atyushov

October 29, 2008; 20:00 YEKT	Metallurg Magnitogorsk (Russia)	5–2 (4–0, 0–1, 1–1)	(Germany) Eisbären Berlin	Magnitogorsk Arena, Magnitogorsk; Attendance: 7,701

Game reference

November 12, 2008; 20:30 EET	Kärpät (Finland)	2–3 (GWS) (1–0, 0–1, 1–1, 0–1)	(Germany) Eisbären Berlin	Oulun Energia Areena, Oulu; Attendance: 4,619

Game reference

November 19, 2008; 20:00 YEKT	Metallurg Magnitogorsk (Russia)	3–1 (0–0, 2–0, 1–1)	(Finland) Kärpät	Magnitogorsk Arena, Magnitogorsk; Attendance: 7,593

Game reference

December 3, 2008; 19:30 CET	Eisbären Berlin (Germany)	2–1 (1–0, 1–1, 0–0)	(Russia) Metallurg Magnitogorsk	O2 World, Berlin; Attendance: 13,500

Game reference

=== Group B ===
Espoo won all 4 of their games and qualified for the semi-final after gameday 5. The top scorer in group B was Bern's Christian Dubé with 5 goals (and 0 assists).

Team	GP	W	OTW	OTL	L	GF	GA	PTS
(Finland) Espoo Blues	4	4	0	0	0	13	4	12
(Sweden) HV71	4	1	0	0	3	13	18	3
(Switzerland) SC Bern	4	1	0	0	3	11	15	3

October 8, 2008; 19:30 CET	HV71 (Sweden)	6–2 (1–0, 2–0, 3–2)	(Switzerland) SC Bern	Kinnarps Arena, Jönköping; Attendance: 6,903

Game reference
T. Laine (PP) 18:29; T. Laine (ES) 20:20; M. Tedenby (ES) 22:31; M. Thörnberg (PP) 44:22; J. Lindström (ES) 44:36; B. Melin (ES) 51:38 / Goals / 48:36 (PP) S. Bordeleau; 55:41 (ES) C. Dubé

October 22, 2008; 19:30 CET	SC Bern (Switzerland)	1–3 (0–2, 0–0, 1–1)	(Finland) Espoo Blues	PostFinance Arena, Berne; Attendance: 6,756

Game reference
S. Gamache (ES) 53:55 / Goals / 03:19 (ES) T. Kähkönen; 19:39 (PP) E. Rajamäki; 59:55 (EN) J. Uhlbäck

October 29, 2008; 20:30 EET	Espoo Blues (Finland)	3–2 (2–1, 0–0, 1–1)	(Sweden) HV71	LänsiAuto Areena, Espoo; Attendance: 6,083

Game reference

November 12, 2008; 19:30 CET	SC Bern (Switzerland)	7–5 (1–3, 3–0, 3–2)	(Sweden) HV71	PostFinance Arena, Berne; Attendance: 7,057

Game reference

November 19, 2008; 20:30 EET	Espoo Blues (Finland)	2–1 (2–1, 0–0, 0–0)	(Switzerland) SC Bern	LänsiAuto Areena, Espoo; Attendance: 6,247

Game reference

December 3, 2008; 19:30 CET	HV71 (Sweden)	0–6 (0–3, 0–1, 0–2)	(Finland) Espoo Blues	Kinnarps Arena, Jönköping; Attendance: 5,028

Game reference

=== Group C ===
Salavat Yulaev was the first team of the 2008–09 Champions Hockey League to qualify for the semi-finals after winning their first three games. The top scorer in group C was Ufa's Alexander Radulov with 1 goal and 4 assists.

Team	GP	W	OTW	OTL	L	GF	GA	PTS
(Russia) Salavat Yulaev Ufa	4	4	0	0	0	22	5	12
(Czech Republic) HC České Budějovice	4	1	0	0	3	9	17	3
(Slovakia) HC Slovan Bratislava	4	1	0	0	3	11	20	3

October 8, 2008; 20:00 YEKT	Salavat Yulaev Ufa (Russia)	7–1 (1–0, 3–0, 3–1)	(Czech Republic) HC České Budějovice	Ufa Arena, Ufa; Attendance: 7,835

Game reference
K. Koltsov (PP) 11:19; R. Nurtdinov (ES) 21:15; A. Perezhogin (ES) 34:06; I. Grigorenko (ES) 39:11; L. Cermak (PP) 43:17; A. Perezhogin (SH) 45:57; K. Koltsov (ES) 55:37 / Goals / 45:19 (ES) T. Kurka

October 22, 2008; 19:30 CET	HC České Budějovice (Czech Republic)	5–2 (1–0, 2–1, 2–1)	(Slovakia) HC Slovan Bratislava	Budvar Arena, České Budějovice; Attendance: 4,250

Game reference
M. Hudec (ES) 01:17; P. Gregorek (PP) 22:52; I. Huml (SH) 29:49; O. Vesely (ES) 40:28; R. Horak (ES) 46:47 / Goals / 24:08 (ES) L. Vaic; 50:28 (ES) R. Kukumberg

October 29, 2008; 19:30 CET	HC Slovan Bratislava (Slovakia)	2–4 (1–0, 1–3, 0–1)	(Russia) Salavat Yulaev Ufa	Samsung Arena, Bratislava; Attendance: 5,238

Game reference
M. Lazo (ES) 06:54; R. Liscak (ES) 23:01 / Goals / 20:50 (ES) I. Shadilov; 30:09 (PP) V. Vorobyev; 39:11 (ES) A. Radulov; 48:15 (ES) K. Koltsov

November 12, 2008; 19:30 CET	HC České Budějovice (Czech Republic)	0–3 (0–2, 0–1, 0–0)	(Russia) Salavat Yulaev Ufa	Budvar Arena, České Budějovice; Attendance: 4,109

Game reference

November 19, 2008; 19:30 CET	HC Slovan Bratislava (Slovakia)	5–3 (3–0, 0–0, 2–3)	(Czech Republic) HC České Budějovice	Samsung Arena, Bratislava; Attendance: 4,880

Game reference

December 3, 2008; 20:00 YEKT	Salavat Yulaev Ufa (Russia)	8–2 (1–1, 4–1, 3–0)	(Slovakia) HC Slovan Bratislava	Ufa Arena, Ufa; Attendance: 8,292

Game reference

=== Group D ===
The winner of group D was not decided until the final game in Prague between Slavia and the ZSC Lions. In front of 8,137 spectators, the Lions won the game 5–1 after scoring 4 goals in the last period. The group's top scorer (and the leading scorer after all group stage games) was Adrian Wichser from ZSC with 9 assists (and 0 goals).

Team	GP	W	OTW	OTL	L	GF	GA	PTS
(Switzerland) ZSC Lions	4	3	0	1	0	20	11	10
(Czech Republic) HC Slavia Praha	4	2	1	0	1	15	15	8
(Sweden) Linköpings HC	4	0	0	0	4	11	20	0

October 8, 2008; 19:30 CET	HC Slavia Praha (Czech Republic)	4–2 (2–1, 1–1, 1–0)	(Sweden) Linköpings HC	O2 Arena, Prague; Attendance: 4,108

Game reference
M. Vondrka (ES) 15:26; R. Červenka (PP) 17:24; R. Červenka (PP) 38:26; J. Bednář (ES) 49:19 / Goals / 08:31 (ES) J. Fransson; 36:30 (ES) P. Petterstrom

October 22, 2008; 19:30 CET	Linköpings HC (Sweden)	2–7 (2–2, 0–2, 0–3)	(Switzerland) ZSC Lions	Cloetta Center, Linköping; Attendance: 7,961

Game reference
M. Ylven (ES) 02:32; J. Eriksson (ES) 18:59 / Goals / 06:47 (ES) S. Blindenbacher; 17:53 (PP) T. Monnet; 26:59 (ES) P. Sejna; 38:24 (ES) P. Sejna; 42:42 (ES) C. Buhler; 47:30 (ES) T. Monnet; 57:51 (PP) D. Pittis

October 29, 2008; 19:30 CET	ZSC Lions (Switzerland)	4–5 (GWS) (0–1, 1–1, 3–2, 0–1)	(Czech Republic) HC Slavia Praha	Hallenstadion, Zürich; Attendance: 8,220

Game reference

November 12, 2008; 19:30 CET	Linköpings HC (Sweden)	4–5 (0–2, 3–1, 1–2)	(Czech Republic) HC Slavia Praha	Cloetta Center, Linköping; Attendance: 6,842

Game reference

November 19, 2008; 19:30 CET	ZSC Lions (Switzerland)	4–3 (1–1, 2–1, 1–1)	(Sweden) Linköpings HC	Hallenstadion, Zürich; Attendance: 8,574

Game reference

December 3, 2008; 19:30 CET	HC Slavia Praha (Czech Republic)	1–5 (0–1, 1–0, 0–4)	(Switzerland) ZSC Lions	O2 Arena, Prague; Attendance: 8,137

Game reference

== Knockout round ==
Semifinals
(Russia) Metallurg Magnitogorsk	1	3	1(2)
(Russia) Salavat Yulaev Ufa	2	1	1(0)
(Switzerland) ZSC Lions	6	4	2
(Finland) Espoo Blues	3	1	0

Finals
(Russia) Metallurg Magnitogorsk	2	0	0
(Switzerland) ZSC Lions	2	5	1

== Semi-finals ==
The semi-finals were played as two-legged matches. If a game was tied after 60 minutes, it would have been counted as a tie, without a penalty shoot-out taking place. Only if after two games the teams were level on points (i.e. one win each or two ties), a penalty shoot-out was staged to determine the series winner Home ice advantage of the second game went to the teams with the better records in the group stage.

=== First Semi-final ===
Because both teams from Russia qualified for the semi-finals, they had to play against each other according to the tournament regulations. Salavat Yulaev won the first game in Magnitogorsk with goaltender Alexandr Eremenko stopping 36 shots. The second game in Ufa, however, was won by Metallurg. Therefore, a penalty shoot-out was staged to determine the series winner, which was won 2–0 by Magnitogorsk.

10 December 2008; 20:00 YEKT	Metallurg Magnitogorsk (Russia)	1–2 (0–0, 0–2, 1–0)	(Russia) Salavat Yulaev Ufa	Magnitogorsk Arena, Magnitogorsk; Attendance: 7,750

Game reference

7 January 2009; 20:00 YEKT	Salavat Yulaev Ufa (Russia)	1–3 (0–2 GWS) (0–0, 1–0, 0–3)	(Russia) Metallurg Magnitogorsk	Ufa Arena, Ufa; Attendance: 8,500

Game reference

=== Second Semi-final ===
Because the Hallenstadion in Zürich, the home arena of the ZSC Lions, was not available on the semi-final dates, the Lions were forced to play their home game at the Diners Club Arena in Rapperswil-Jona, about 25 km away from Zurich. The ZSC Lions won both their "home" game and the game in Espoo, where they were accompanied by about 600 fans from Switzerland.

10 December 2008; 19:30 CET	ZSC Lions (Switzerland)	6–3 (1–0, 3–2, 2–1)	(Finland) Espoo Blues	Diners Club Arena, Rapperswil-Jona; Attendance: 6,100

Game reference

7 January 2009; 20:30 EET	Espoo Blues (Finland)	1–4 (0–2, 1–0, 0–2)	(Switzerland) ZSC Lions	LänsiAuto Areena, Espoo; Attendance: 6,612

Game reference

== Finals ==
The final was also played as a two-legged match. Home ice advantage of the second game went to the ZSC Lions which had the better record in the group stage. As in the semi-finals, the Lions were forced to play their home game in Rapperswil in an arena with only half the capacity of the Hallenstadion in Zürich. The game in the Diners Club Arena was sold out within 30 minutes, leaving many fans without a ticket for the most important game in their club's history.

The ZSC Lions became the first-ever Swiss team to win a major European club competition by winning the Champions Hockey League. After a 2–2 draw in Magnitogorsk, the ZSC Lions won the return game against Metallurg Magnitogorsk 5–0 to dethrone the 2008 European club champion. ZSC goaltender Ari Sulander was named Champions Hockey League MVP and was the first to hoist the Silver Stone Trophy.

21 January 2009; 21:30 (UTC+5)	Metallurg Magnitogorsk (Russia)	2–2 (0–2, 0–0, 2–0)	(Switzerland) ZSC Lions	Magnitogorsk Arena, Magnitogorsk; Attendance: 7,700

Game reference

Referees:
(Czech Republic) Radek Husička
(Czech Republic) Vladimír Šindler
Linesmen:
(Czech Republic) Petr Blümel
(Czech Republic) Roman Pouzar

	0–1	09:14 – Trudel (Schelling, Pittis)
	0–2	12:05 – Wichser (Sejna, Gardner)
Atyushov (Marek) – 51:01	1–2
Rolinek (Varlamov) – 59:17	2–2

8 min
Penalties
8 min
35
Shots
28

28 January 2009; 19:30 (UTC+1)	ZSC Lions (Switzerland)	5–0 (1–0, 1–0, 3–0)	(Russia) Metallurg Magnitogorsk	Diners Club Arena, Rapperswil; Attendance: 6,200

Game reference

Referees:
(Finland) Tom Laaksonen
(Finland) Jari Levonen
Linesmen:
(Finland) Mikko Kekäläinen
(Finland) Jussi Terho

Down (Pittis, Trudel) – 17:17	1–0
Sejna (Wichser, Suchý) (PP) – 34:48	2–0
Seger (Pittis, Monnet) (PP) – 48:57	3–0
Alston (Geering, Monnet) – 49:51	4–0
Trudel (Pittis, Down) – 57:29	5–0

6 min
Penalties
10 min
39
Shots
25

Champions Hockey League
2008–09 Winners

ZSC Lions
First Title

== Statistics ==
=== Scoring leaders ===
List shows the top skaters sorted by points, then goals. If the list exceeds 5 skaters because of a tie in points, all of the tied skaters are shown.

Pos	Player	Team	GP	G	A	Pts	+/−	PIM
1	(Canada) Jean-Guy Trudel	(Switzerland) ZSC Lions	8	4	9	13	+1	2
2	(Switzerland) Adrian Wichser	(Switzerland) ZSC Lions	8	1	12	13	+4	4
3	(Canada) Domenic Pittis	(Switzerland) ZSC Lions	8	1	10	11	0	6
4	(Slovakia) Peter Sejna	(Switzerland) ZSC Lions	8	5	5	10	+8	0
5	(Czech Republic) Jan Marek	(Russia) Metallurg Magnitogorsk	8	3	7	10	+7	14

GP = Games played; G = Goals; A = Assists; Pts = Points; +/− = Plus/minus; PIM = Penalties In Minutes
Source: IIHF.com

=== Leading goaltenders ===
Only the top five goaltenders, based on save percentage, who have played 40% of their team's minutes are included in this list.

Pos	Player	Team	TOI	SA	GA	GAA	Sv%	SO
1	(Russia) Alexandr Eremenko	(Russia) Salavat Yulaev Ufa	280:00	145	7	1.50	95.17	0
2	(Russia) Ilya Proskuryakov	(Russia) Metallurg Magnitogorsk	478:29	233	15	1.88	93.56	1
3	(Finland) Ari Sulander	(Switzerland) ZSC Lions	480:00	241	17	2.13	92.95	1
4	(Austria) Bernd Brückler	(Finland) Espoo Blues	299:09	136	10	2.01	92.65	1
5	(Germany) Rob Zepp	(Germany) Eisbären Berlin	240:00	97	10	2.50	89.69	0

TOI = Time on ice (minutes:seconds); SA = Shots against; GA = Goals against; GAA = Goals against average; Sv% = Save percentage; SO = Shutouts
Source: IIHF.com
