= Svirsky =

Svirsky (feminine: Svirskaya) is a Russian-language toponymic surname literally meaning "of Svir"/"from Svir". Another transliteration is Swirsky. The Polish-language equivalent is Świrski.

Notable people with this surname include:

- Grigory Svirsky
- Alexander Svirsky
