= Abdrakhmanov =

Abdrakhmanov is a surname. Notable people with the surname include:

- Asaf Abdrakhmanov (1918–2000), Soviet World War II naval hero
- Berik Abdrakhmanov (born 1986), Kazakh amateur boxer
- Ruslan Abdrakhmanov (born 1984), Russian professional ice hockey player
