= Khakimov =

Khakimov is a surname. Notable people with the surname include:

- Karim Khakimov (1890–1938), Tartar revolutionary and diplomat
- Nikita Khakimov (born 1988), Russian badminton player
- Rafael Khakimov (born 1990), Russian ice hockey player

== See also ==
- Hakimov, surname
