= Swirsky =

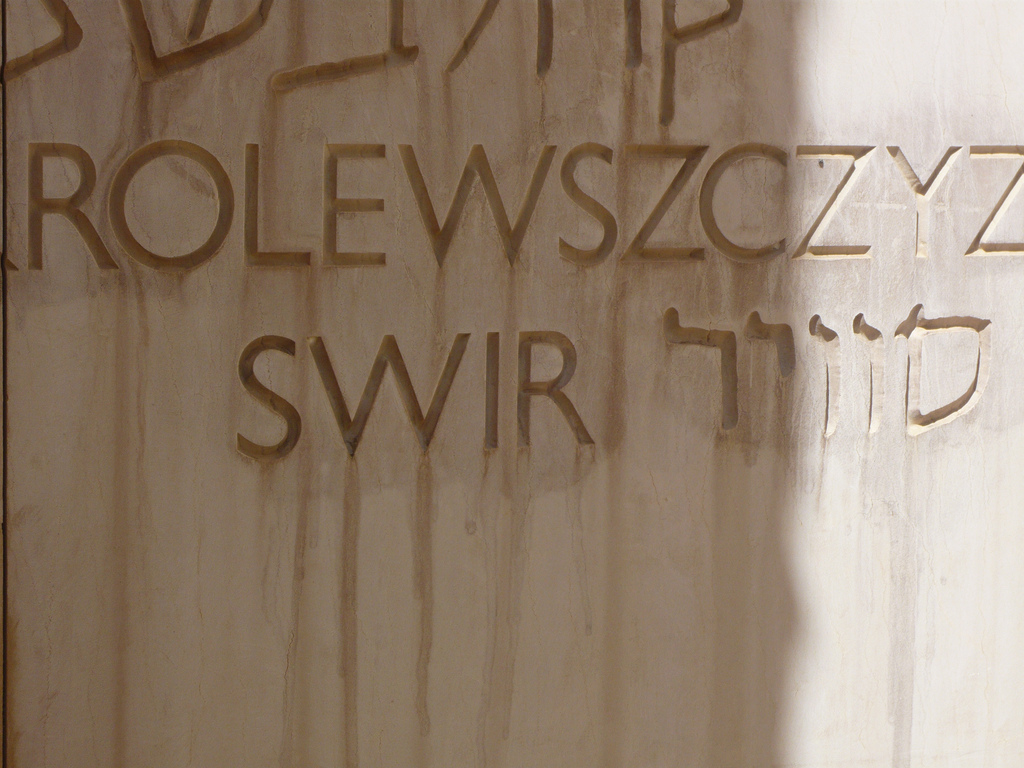
Swir featured on the Valley of Communities at Yad Vashem

Swirsky (feminine: Swirskaya) is an East Slavic-language surname, a variant of the Polish surname Świrski. Another Russian-language form is Svirsky.

Notable people with this surname include:

- Chuck Swirsky (b. 1954) - sports commentator.
- David Swirsky - vocalist for the Moshav Band
- Rachel Swirsky (b. 1982) - science fiction & fantasy author.
- Robert Swirsky (b. 1962) - computer scientist, author, pianist.
- Seth Swirsky (b. 1960) - songwriter, recording artist, author.
- Thamara Swirskaya (1888-1961), Russia-born dancer
