= Hakimov =

Hakimov is a surname. Notable people with the surname include:

- Mansur Hakimov (born 1977), Tajikistani footballer
- Numonjon Hakimov (born 1978), Tajikistani footballer
- Rahim Hakimov (born 1983) Uzbek legal scholar and politician

== See also ==
- Khakimov, surname
