= Champions Hockey League (2008–09) =

One-off European ice hockey tournament

- Sport: Ice hockey
- Founded: 2008
- First season: 2008
- Folded: 2009
- CEO: Craig Thompson
- No. of teams: 12 (group stage); 14 (total)
- Country: Multiple in Europe
- Last champion: (Switzerland) ZSC Lions (1)
- Broadcasters: Europe: various USA: Universal Sports; CAN: The Score
- Related competitions: Victoria Cup
- Website: championshockeyleague.com

The Champions Hockey League was an ice hockey tournament which was launched in 2008 by the International Ice Hockey Federation (IIHF) after adopting the proposal put forth by Ovation Sports AG, and only played in the 2008–09 season. Its creation coincided with the IIHF's 100th anniversary and replaced the IIHF European Champions Cup, the previous competition for Europe's top ice hockey teams. The financial reward for progressing to the CHL Group Stage was a portion of the 16.9 million Swiss francs that was distributed between the teams with a 1,000,000 Swiss francs bonus going to the winner; the largest monetary reward ever given in any European ice hockey competition.

The Silver Stone Trophy, which has been awarded to the top club team in European hockey since 1997, was the CHL's championship trophy. Because of contractual problems between the IIHF and CHL investors, the Champions Hockey League was cancelled after only one season had been played.

On December 9, 2013, the IIHF officially announced that they had launched a new tournament with the same name, born out of the original Champions Hockey League and the European Trophy, starting in the 2014–15 season.

== Format ==
Map of teams which have reached the group stage of the Champions Hockey League Member country that has been represented in the group stage Member country that has not been represented in the group stage Not a member

The Champions Hockey League was planned to be a best-of-the-best competition contested among the European national club champions and the top runners-up of the best seven hockey leagues, a total of 12 teams. The 12 teams included the champions of the best seven leagues and a second team from each of the best four leagues. The second teams from the leagues placed 5–7, played a qualification tournament over one weekend to determine the twelfth and final participant of the Champions Hockey League.

The following table based on the 2008 IIHF League Ranking gives an overview over the qualification process.

== Teams ==
Russia	Kontinental Hockey League	Two teams in the 2008–09 CHL
Finland	SM-liiga	Two teams in the 2008–09 CHL
Czech Republic	Czech Extraliga	Two teams in the 2008–09 CHL
Sweden	Elitserien	Two teams in the 2008–09 CHL
Slovakia	Slovak Extraliga	One team guaranteed in the 2008–09 CHL + one qualifier
Switzerland	National League A	One team guaranteed in the 2008–09 CHL + one qualifier
Germany	Deutsche Eishockey Liga	One team guaranteed in the 2008–09 CHL + one qualifier
Belarus	Belarusian Hockey League	Teams from these leagues had planned to participate in the following season of the CHL (which was never played).
Latvia	Latvian Hockey League	Teams from these leagues had planned to participate in the following season of the CHL (which was never played).
Denmark	Oddset Ligaen	Teams from these leagues had planned to participate in the following season of the CHL (which was never played).
Austria	Austrian Hockey League	Teams from these leagues had planned to participate in the following season of the CHL (which was never played).
Kazakhstan	Kazakhstan Hockey Championship	Teams from these leagues had planned to participate in the following season of the CHL (which was never played).
Great Britain	Elite Ice Hockey League	Teams from these leagues had planned to participate in the following season of the CHL (which was never played).
Norway	GET-ligaen	Teams from these leagues had planned to participate in the following season of the CHL (which was never played).
France	Ligue Magnus	Teams from these leagues had planned to participate in the following season of the CHL (which was never played).
Slovenia	Slovenian Ice Hockey League	Teams from these leagues had planned to participate in the following season of the CHL (which was never played).
Italy	Serie A	Teams from these leagues had planned to participate in the following season of the CHL (which was never played).
Hungary	OB I bajnokság	Teams from these leagues had planned to participate in the following season of the CHL (which was never played).
Poland	Polska Liga Hokejowa	Teams from these leagues had planned to participate in the following season of the CHL (which was never played).
Netherlands	Eredivisie	Teams from these leagues had planned to participate in the following season of the CHL (which was never played).
Ukraine	Professional Hockey League	Teams from these leagues had planned to participate in the following season of the CHL (which was never played).
Romania	Liga Națională de hochei	Teams from these leagues had planned to participate in the following season of the CHL (which was never played).

== Broadcasting ==
The CHL was broadcast across Europe on various national TV networks, as well as on the Internet. It could also be watched regularly in some extra-European markets. Universal Sports (part of the NBC Universal group) was the league's broadcaster in the United States, while The Score held the Canadian rights. Paul Graham produced The Sports Network coverage of the Champions Hockey League.

== History ==
=== 2008–09 season ===
The first edition was played with the top 12 teams from the top seven leagues in Europe. The four top leagues (Russia, Czech Republic, Sweden and Finland) were represented with two teams each. The leagues ranked 5-7 (Slovakia, Switzerland and Germany) were represented with one team. A second team from Switzerland (SC Bern), qualified for the main stage by winning a qualifying tournament which was held in September.

The main phase of the CHL consisted of 4 groups with 3 teams each that played home and away games against the two other teams in the group, with the 4 group winners advancing to the semi-finals. In the first semi-final, the two Russian teams Metallurg Magnitogorsk and Salavat Yulaev Ufa played against each other. After both teams won one game, a penalty shoot-out had to be played to decide the winner. Magnitogorsk was luckier and advanced to the final. In the other semi-final, the Swiss ZSC Lions played against Finnish team Espoo Blues. ZSC won both games and qualified for the final.

The first game of the final was played in Magnitogorsk and ended in a 2–2 draw. The decisive second game was played in Rapperswil, Switzerland and won 5–0 by the ZSC Lions, which became the Champions Hockey League winners.

The Champions League proved to be very popular with the fans and the media, and had larger average attendance than the seven national hockey leagues' regular season games of that season.

=== Victoria Cup ===
It was planned that every year, the Champions Hockey League winner and one team from the National Hockey League play for the IIHF-run Victoria Cup. The first edition in 2008 was won by the New York Rangers who beat the IIHF European Champions Cup winners from the previous season, Metallurg Magnitogorsk. The second edition in 2009 saw the ZSC Lions defeating the Chicago Blackhawks.

=== Cancellation ===
The International Ice Hockey Federation (IIHF) officially announced on 15 June 2009 the cancellation of the Champions Hockey League for the 2009–10 season, but that it would possibly be resumed in the 2010–11 season, with the possible contribution of the NHL. The continuation of the league was already called into question in January when the IIHF's main investors pulled out of their commitments to back the league for three seasons. Conflict with the NHL also arose when several Russian KHL teams signed Russian players that were under contract with NHL teams.

Some teams were considering legal actions against IIHF for the cancellation of the CHL, because "the clubs have blocked out game dates and C.H.L. participation in their budget-planning consideration", as Gernot Tripcke, the general manager of the Deutsche Eishockey Liga (DEL), said. The participating clubs in the 2008–09 season were unanimous in their support for continuing the Champions Hockey League.

On 21 October 2009, the IIHF announced an agreement with Hockey Europe to re-launch the CHL during the 2010–11 season, with teams from the 7 top European leagues (although the agreement was cancelled later, see below). Included in the agreement was to be a settlement that would've compensated the clubs that qualified for the cancelled 2009–10 edition.

Due to the contractual problems between the IIHF and their investors, on 25 November 2009, Ovation Sports AG, the founding organization behind the Champions Hockey League, announced that they were discontinuing their efforts and that the league would not continue.

On 9 March 2010, the IIHF announced that they and the European leagues failed to agree on a re-launch of the Champions Hockey League. Therefore, there was no CHL during the 2010–11 season. Thus, the CHL had probably been permanently cancelled.

On 6 December 2010, the IIHF announced that the federation "...invites Europe's top clubs to a repeat of [the] 2008-2009 success of the initial Champions Hockey League". The IIHF Council approved the re-launch of the Champions Hockey League for the 2011–12 season, with the overall planned length of the approved project of 3 seasons. However, on 23 February 2011, the IIHF announced that the Council had decided to postpone the plans for a re-launch of the CHL in the 2011–12 season, due to lack of interest from professional leagues.

The Champions Hockey League was eventually re-launched when on 9 December 2013, the IIHF officially announced that they had launched a new tournament with the same name, starting in the 2014–15 season.

== See also ==
- European Trophy, a similar tournament played annually between 2006–2013
