= Świrski =

Świrski is the name two different Polish noble families who do not share same descents. It is a toponymic surname literally meaning "of Świr", in the case of Świrskis of Lis clan (House of Świrski of Lis clan) or "of Świrz", in the case of Świrskis of Szaława clan, see Svirzh Castle (House of Świrski of Szaława clan). Belarusian-language form: Swirsky, Russian: Svirsky, Lithianian: Svirskis.

Notable persons with this surname include:

- Jerzy Świrski (1882–1959), Polish vice admiral and officer in the Russian Imperial Navy and later the Polish Navy
- Peter Swirski (born 1966), Canadian scholar and literary critic

== See also ==
- Swirski mite
