= Nikita Davydov =

Russian ice hockey player

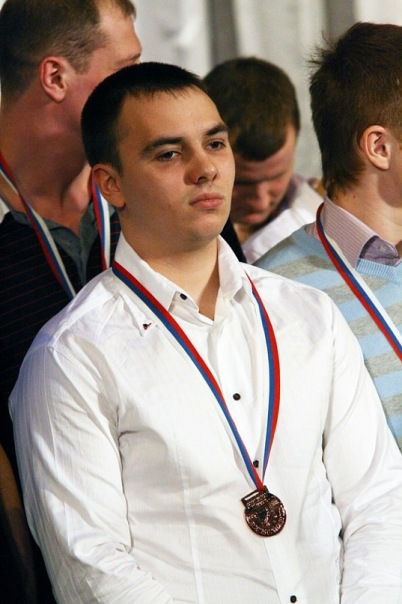
- Born: 9 April 1988 (age 37) Ufa, RUS
- Height: 5 ft 9 in (175 cm)
- Weight: 185 lb (84 kg; 13 st 3 lb)
- Position: Goaltender
- Catches: Left
- KHL team Former teams: Atlant Moscow Oblast; Salavat Yulaev Ufa
- Playing career: 2008–present

Nikita Davydov (born 9 April 1988) is a Russian professional ice hockey goaltender currently playing for Atlant Moscow Oblast of the Kontinental Hockey League.
