= Petr Gřegořek =

Czech ice hockey player

- Born: May 25, 1978 (age 47) Český Těšín, TCH
- Height: 5 ft 11 in (180 cm)
- Weight: 194 lb (88 kg; 13 st 12 lb)
- Position: Defence
- Shot: Left
- Played for: HC Vítkovice; HC Třinec; HC České Budějovice; Bílí Tygři Liberec; Molot-Prikamie Perm; Vsetínská hokejová HC Energie Karlovy Vary; HC Sparta Praha; HC Milevsko 2010
- National team: Czech Republic
- NHL draft: Undrafted
- Playing career: 1997–2020

Petr Gřegořek (born May 25, 1978) is a Czech professional ice hockey player who participated at the 2010 IIHF World Championship as a member of the Czech Republic National men's ice hockey team.

He previously played for HC Oceláři Třinec, HC Bílí Tygři Liberec, HC České Budějovice and HC Vsetín.

== Career statistics ==
			Regular season					Playoffs
Season	Team	League	GP	G	A	Pts	PIM	GP	G	A	Pts	PIM
1995–96	HC Slezan Opava U20	Czech U20	28	4	6	10	—	—	—	—	—	—
1996–97	HC Vitkovice U20	Czech U20	36	1	7	8	—	—	—	—	—	—
1996–97	HC Vitkovice	Czech	1	0	0	0	0	—	—	—	—	—
1997–98	HC Vitkovice	Czech	1	0	0	0	0	—	—	—	—	—
1997–98	HC Trinec	Czech	34	1	4	5	32	12	0	1	1	8
1998–99	HC Trinec	Czech	48	3	4	7	76	8	1	1	2	6
1999–00	HC Ocelari Trinec	Czech	49	8	11	19	95	3	0	0	0	4
2000–01	HC Ocelari Trinec	Czech	47	5	8	13	68	—	—	—	—	—
2001–02	HC Ocelari Trinec	Czech	41	4	3	7	61	6	2	1	3	22
2002–03	HC Ceske Budejovice	Czech	23	1	4	5	14	—	—	—	—	—
2002–03	Bili Tygri Liberec	Czech	15	0	0	0	8	—	—	—	—	—
2002–03	HC Ocelari Trinec	Czech	5	0	1	1	29	12	1	3	4	8
2003–04	Molot-Prikamye Perm	Russia2	40	2	4	6	22	13	1	1	2	8
2003–04	Molot-Prikamye Perm-2	Russia3	1	0	0	0	0	—	—	—	—	—
2004–05	Vsetínská hokejová	Czech	34	2	3	5	20	—	—	—	—	—
2004–05	HC Ceske Budejovice	Czech2	6	0	1	1	0	7	0	1	1	8
2005–06	HC Ceske Budejovice	Czech	51	8	16	24	54	10	1	3	4	4
2006–07	HC Mountfield	Czech	50	9	10	19	96	10	2	0	2	51
2007–08	HC Mountfield	Czech	49	6	8	14	52	12	2	0	2	31
2008–09	HC Mountfield	Czech	51	4	8	12	42	—	—	—	—	—
2009–10	HC Mountfield	Czech	50	6	23	29	104	5	3	0	3	0
2010–11	HC Energie Karlovy Vary	Czech	48	4	9	13	64	5	0	1	1	4
2011–12	HC Energie Karlovy Vary	Czech	46	4	17	21	82	—	—	—	—	—
2012–13	HC Energie Karlovy Vary	Czech	20	3	4	7	10	—	—	—	—	—
2012–13	HC Sparta Praha	Czech	31	3	4	7	20	7	0	0	0	4
2013–14	HC Sparta Praha	Czech	18	1	1	2	6	—	—	—	—	—
2013–14	Bili Tygri Liberec	Czech	17	1	8	9	10	3	0	1	1	2
2013–14	Bili Tygri Liberec	Czech	36	0	7	7	65	—	—	—	—	—
2018–19	HC Milevsko 2010	Czech4	7	0	5	5	4	—	—	—	—	—
2019–20	HC Milevsko 2010	Czech4	5	2	1	3	29	2	1	1	2	0
Czech totals			765	73	153	226	1,008	105	12	13	25	148
