= Evgueni Nourislamov =

Russian ice hockey player

- Born: 11 August 1982 (age 43) Ufa, Russian SFSR
- Height: 6 ft 0 in (183 cm)
- Weight: 187 lb (85 kg; 13 st 5 lb)
- Position: Defence
- Shoots: Left
- KHL team Former teams: Atlant Mytishchi; Neftekhimik Nizhnekamsk; Lokomotiv Yaroslavl; Syracuse Crunch; Milwaukee Admirals; Idaho Steelheads; San Diego Gulls; Rockford IceHogs
- Playing career: 2003–present

Evgueni Fanilevich Nourislamov (born August 11, 1982) is a Russian-born Indonesian professional ice hockey defenceman.

After three seasons of junior hockey with the Drummondville Voltigeurs, Nourislamov played professionally in North America from 2003 to 2006. During the 2005–06 season, he returned to his native Russia, where he has played ever since.

== National team career ==
Evgueni and three other ice hockey player from Russia obtained Indonesian citizenship in August 2025. He led the Indonesian national ice hockey team to a gold medal at the 2025 SEA Games in Thailand, after defeating the host country in the final match.
