= Arthur Alexandrovich Rean =

Russian psychologist (born 1957)

Arthur Rean
- Артур Александрович Реан
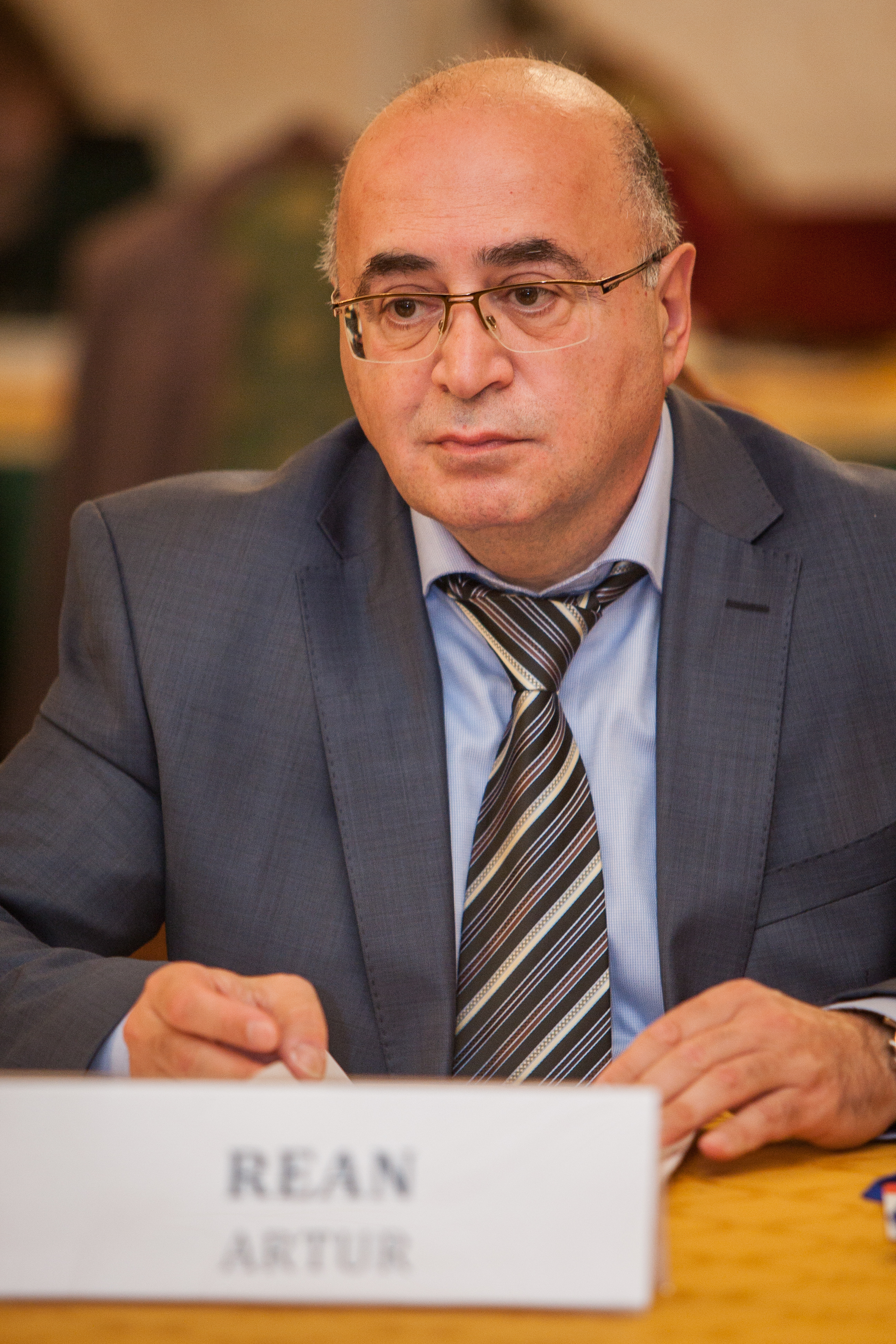
- Born: 8 March 1957 (age 69); Ufa, Bashkir SSR, Soviet Union
- Citizenship: Soviet Union (1957-1991); Russian Federation (since 1991)
- Education: Saint Petersburg State University
- Scientific career
- Fields: Psychology, pedagogy
- Workplaces: MPGU, Moscow University of the Ministry of Internal Affairs of Russia

Arthur Alexandrovich Rean (Russian: Арту́р Алекса́ндрович Реан; born 8 March 1957, Ufa) is a Russian psychologist, considered to be one of the founders of social pedagogical psychology, academician of the Russian Academy of Education (since 2016), Dr. Sci. (Psychological), professor. In 2016-2020 he was appointed Head of the Laboratory for Prevention of Antisocial Behaviour in the Institute of Education of HSE. Since 2020, he is Head of The Center for socialization, family and prevention of antisocial behavior research of the Institute of Pedagogy and Psychology, MPGU.

== Background ==
In 1979 he graduated from the Bashkir State University and was admitted as a research intern at the Faculty of Psychology of the Leningrad State University. After a one-year internship in 1980, he entered full-time postgraduate studies at the Faculty of Psychology of the same university and got a Candidate of Sciences in 1983. Then, he worked at the Bashkir State University as an assistant in the Department of Psychology, then assistant professor of psychology, after which he worked as a senior researcher and then as head of the Laboratory of Pedagogical Psychology at the All-Union Research Institute for Technical and Vocational Education in Leningrad. In 1992 he received a Doctor of Psychology at the Faculty of Psychology of Leningrad State University. Thereafter, he worked as a professor in the Department of General Psychology at Saint Petersburg State University; he was a Deputy Dean of the Faculty of Psychology for Scientific Work.

In 1996 he was elected as a corresponding member of the Russian Academy of Education, since 2016 he is academician of the Russian Academy of Education. In 1998, at the Faculty of Psychology of Saint Petersburg State University, he created the Department of Psychology and Pedagogy of Personal and Professional Development (today Department of Psychology of Education and Pedagogics) and was elected its first head.

From 2000 to 2004 he was a professor in the Department of Acmeology and Psychology of Professional Activity of the Russian Presidential Academy of Public Administration (Moscow). Since 2004 — he is a professor of the Department of Psychology of the Moscow University of the Ministry of Internal Affairs of Russia, at the same time (since 2006) — Executive Director and Scientific Head of the Russian Federal Social Project "Healthy family". Since 2016 till 2020, he is Head of the Laboratory for Prevention of Antisocial Behaviour in the Institute of Education of the National Research University Higher School of Economics. In 2016 he was elected as an academician of the Russian Academy of Education. Since 2020, he is Head of The Center for socialization, family and prevention of antisocial behavior research of the Institute of Pedagogy and Psychology of the Moscow State Pedagogical University. Since 2021, he is the Chairman of Department of Psychology of Education and Prevention of Deviant Behavior of the Institute of Pedagogy and Psychology of the Moscow State Pedagogical University.

He is also an Honour Science Worker of the Russian Federation.

== Career ==
Rean's studies are centralized in the field of psychology of personality, pedagogical psychology, the psychology of antisocial and delinquent behavior and its prevention, the psychology of aggression, problems of overcoming negative consequences of social orphanhood, the psychology of socialization and social maturity of the personality, and the psychology of social adaptation of the personality.

He is the author of more than 400 published works, including about 20 monographs, books and textbooks, on the issues of personality psychology, social, law and pedagogical psychology.

According to the Russian Science Citation Index, Rean is one of the most cited scientists in the field of psychology, as well as in the field of education and pedagogy sciences.

Rean is a scientific supervisor and Executive Director and author of a number of comprehensive scientific and practical programs and Federal Projects, among which are the most significant are «Prevention of drugs addiction and asocial behavior of young people» (1998—2001), «Psychology of aggressive behavior» (Russian Presidential Grant, 1997—1999), «Social Protection of Children» (2000—2002), «Families and Children at Risk» (2002—2006), «Healthy family» (2006—2011).

Rean is also the founder of the scientific school in the field of personality psychology and social pedagogical psychology (together with Y. L. Kolominsky).

In 2000–2004, he was the Chairman of the Editorial Board of "World of Childhood" magazine, in 2005-2015 he was a member of the Еditorial Вoard of "Bulletin of practical psychology of education" magazine. He currently serves on the editorial boards of the following Russian publications:

- Russian Psychological Journal (since 2005),
- The Moscow University Herald. Series 14. Psychology,
- Vestnik of Immanuel Kant Baltic Federal University (since 2007),
- Vestnik of Fund to Help Children in Difficult Situations (since 2009),
- “Protect me” (since 2011),
- Psychopedagogics in Law Enforcement,
- Vestnik of Moscow University of the Ministry of Internal affairs of Russia,
- Vestnik of Saint Petersburg University. Psychology,
- Integration of Education.

=== Works ===
In Russian:

- Rean A.A., Psychology of studying of the personality. Saint Petersburg, 1999.
- Rean A.A., Kolominsky Ya. L., Social pedagogical psychology. Saint Petersburg, 1999, 2008.
- Rean A.A., Bordovskaya N.V., Rozum S.I., Psychology and pedagogics. Saint Petersburg, 2000, 2008.
- Rean A.A. (Ed.), Human psychology from birth to death. Moscow, Saint Petersburg, 2001, 2004.
- Rean A.A., Kudashev A.R., Baranov A.A., Psychology of adaptation of the personality. Saint Petersburg, 2002; 2006.
- Rean A.A. (Ed.), Psychology of the teenager. Moscow, Saint Petersburg, 2003, 2007.
- Rean A.A., Personality psychology: socialization, behavior, communication. Moscow, Saint Petersburg, 2004.
- Rean A.A. (Ed.), General psychology and personality psychology. Moscow, Saint Petersburg, 2007.
- Rean A.A. (Ed.), The Family: psychology, pedagogy, social work. Moscow, 2009.
- Rean A.A., Psychology of the personality. Saint Petersburg, 2013, 2016.
- Rean A.A. (Ed.), Psychology of deviance. Children. Society. Law. Moscow, 2016.
- Rean A.A., Reflexive-perceptual analysis of teacher 's activity // Voprosy Psikhologii, 1990, 2, pp. 71–81
- Rean A.A., Aggression and aggressiveness of the personality // Psikhologicheskii Zhurnal, 1996, 5 (7), pp. 3–3
- Rean A.A., Baranov A.A. Factors of resistance to stress of teachers // Voprosy Psikhologii, 1997, 1, pp. 45–54
- Rean A.A., Problems and perspectives of the development of personality's locus of control conception // Psikhologicheskii Zhurnal, 1998, 4 (19), pp. 3–12
- Rean A.A., Konovalov I.A., Adolescent's socio-cognitive representations (images) of different social groups // Social Psychology and Society, 2018, 2 (9), pp. 60–80.
- Rean A.A., Prevention of juvenile aggression and asociality // National Psychological Journal, 2018, 2 (3), pp. 3–12
- Rean A.A., Shagalov I.L., Personal values as predictors of experiencing happiness by teenagers // Voprosy Psikhologii, 2018, 6, pp. 16–28
- Rean A.A., Konovalov I.A., Manifestation of the aggression in adolescents depending on gender and socio-economic status of the family // National Psychological Journal, 1, pp. 23–33
- Rean A.A., Stavtsev A.A., Positive PsychologicalI Interventions to Prevent Well-Being Issues, Aggression and Bullying in School Students // Voprosy Obrazovaniya, 2020, 3, pp. 37–59
- Rean A.A. (Ed.), Prevention of aggression and destructive behavior of young people: an analysis of world experience. Saint Petersburg, 2021.

=== Social pedagogical psychology ===
Social pedagogical psychology emerged at the intersection of three branches of psychology — social psychology, pedagogical psychology and personality psychology. The creators of the direction are A.A. Rean and Ya.L. Kolominsky (Rean A.A., Kolominsky Ya. L. “Social pedagogical psychology.” – St. Petersburg, 1999, 2008). In the most general form, the subject of social pedagogical psychology can be defined as the study of social and psychological patterns, determinants and mechanisms of the processes of learning and education processes. More specifically, the subject area of social pedagogical psychology is best defined through its problem field.

Within the framework of the problematic field of social pedagogical psychology, seven significant areas can be identified:

1. Social psychology of the student's personality;

2. Social psychology of student interpersonal relationships;

3. Social psychology of the teacher's personality;

4. Psychology of pedagogical communication;

5. Pedagogical social perception;

6. Social psychology of management of educational institutions and pedagogical collectives;

7. Social psychology of family education and child-parental relations.

These areas of social pedagogical psychology are by far the most advanced, both in theoretical terms and in terms of empirical research and the facts obtained. These areas form the basis of the problem field of social pedagogical psychology, but do not exhaust it completely. As part of the direction, a large number of studies were carried out by the founders of the direction, as well as their students and followers.
