= IIHF European Champions Cup =

Annual European hockey tournament

The IIHF European Champions Cup (ECC) was an annual event organized by the International Ice Hockey Federation (IIHF), which took place during a long weekend in early January. The winner was considered the official club champion of Europe by the IIHF. The Champions Cup was first played in 2005, as a replacement for the defunct European Cup (1965–1997), and the suspended European Hockey League (1996–2000). In the 2008–09 season, the ECC was replaced by the Champions Hockey League, which was the new official European club championship event. The new tournament was cancelled after only one season. However, another tournament with the same name was introduced in 2014.

== Format ==
The competition featured the reigning club champions from the top six European hockey nations according to the IIHF World Ranking; these teams were known as the Super Six. Two groups of three played in a round-robin tournament, with the winners of each group facing off in a championship game. The two groups were named after international hockey legends Alexander Ragulin and Ivan Hlinka.

== ECC winners (2005–2008) ==
Season	Winner	Score	Runner-up	Group Runner-up (Equal with Semifinalist)	Venue
2005	(Russia) Avangard Omsk	2–1 (OT)	(Finland) Kärpät	Czech Republic and Sweden	St. Petersburg, Russia
2006	(Russia) Dynamo Moscow	4–4 (2-1 SO)	(Finland) Kärpät	Switzerland and Czech Republic	St. Petersburg, Russia
2007	(Russia) Ak Bars Kazan	6–0	(Finland) HPK	Switzerland and Slovakia	St. Petersburg, Russia
2008	(Russia) Metallurg Magnitogorsk	5–2	(Czech Republic) Sparta Praha	Finland and Slovakia	St. Petersburg, Russia

== Medals ==
Rank	Nation	Gold	Silver	Bronze	Total
1	Russia (RUS)	4	0	0	4
2	Finland (FIN)	0	3	1	4
3	Czech Republic (CZE)	0	1	2	3
4	Slovakia (SVK)	0	0	2	2
4	Switzerland (SUI)	0	0	2	2
6	Sweden (SWE)	0	0	1	1
Totals (6 entries)		4	4	8	16

== Participants and results (2005–2008) ==
=== 2005 results ===
Group A

- (Slovakia) Dukla Trenčín – (Russia) Avangard Omsk – 1:6 (1:3; 0:1; 0:2)
- (Sweden) HV71 – (Slovakia) Dukla Trenčín – 4:1 (3:0; 0:0; 1:1)
- (Russia) Avangard Omsk – (Sweden) HV71 – 9:0 (4:0; 2:0; 3:0)

Group B

- (Czech Republic) HC Hamé Zlín – (Germany) Frankfurt Lions – 4:3 (2:2; 0:1; 2:0)
- (Finland) Kärpät – (Czech Republic) HC Hamé Zlín – 4:1 (1:0; 2:1; 1:0)
- (Germany) Frankfurt Lions – (Finland) Kärpät – 3:6 (1:3; 0:2; 2:1)

Final

- (Russia) Avangard Omsk – (Finland) Kärpät – 2:1 (OT) (0:1; 0:0; 1:0; 1:0)

=== 2006 results ===
Alexander Ragulin division

- (Russia) HC Dynamo Moscow – (Slovakia) HC Slovan Bratislava – 3:1 (2:0; 0:0; 1:1)
- (Slovakia) HC Slovan Bratislava – (Czech Republic) HC Moeller-Pardubice – 0:2 (0:0; 0:2; 0:0)
- (Czech Republic) HC Moeller-Pardubice – (Russia) HC Dynamo Moscow – 1:5 (1:3; 0:0; 0:2)

Ivan Hlinka division

- (Finland) Kärpät – (Switzerland) HC Davos – 3:1 (1:0; 0:1; 2:0)
- (Switzerland) HC Davos – (Sweden) Frölunda HC – 6:2 (2:0; 2:1; 2:1)
- (Sweden) Frölunda HC – (Finland) Kärpät – 0:3 (0:1; 0:1; 0:1)

Final

- (Russia) HC Dynamo Moscow – (Finland) Kärpät – 5:4 (in a shootout) (1:0; 1:2; 2:2; 0:0; 2:1)

=== 2007 results ===
Alexander Ragulin division

- (Finland) HPK – (Slovakia) MsHK Žilina – 7:0 (2:0; 3:0; 2:0)
- (Slovakia) MsHK Žilina – (Czech Republic) HC Sparta Praha – 4:2 (0:1; 2:1; 2:0)
- (Czech Republic) HC Sparta Praha – (Finland) HPK – 2:3 (1:1; 1:2; 0:0)

Ivan Hlinka division

- (Russia) Ak Bars Kazan – (Sweden) Färjestad BK – 6:4 (2:2; 2:1; 2:1)
- (Sweden) Färjestad BK – (Switzerland) HC Lugano – 0:3 (0:1; 0:1; 0:1)
- (Switzerland) HC Lugano – (Russia) Ak Bars Kazan – 0:3 (0:1; 0:1; 0:1)

Final

- (Finland) HPK – (Russia) Ak Bars Kazan – 0:6 (0:3, 0:0, 0:3)

=== 2008 results ===
Alexander Ragulin division

- (Russia) Metallurg Magnitogorsk – (Sweden) Modo Hockey – 3:0 (2:0; 1:0; 0:0)
- (Sweden) Modo Hockey – (Slovakia) HC Slovan Bratislava – 1:4 (1:0; 0:3; 0:1)
- (Slovakia) HC Slovan Bratislava – (Russia) Metallurg Magnitogorsk – 1:2 (1:0; 0:0; 0:1; 0:0; 0:1)

Ivan Hlinka division

- (Finland) Kärpät – (Czech Republic) HC Sparta Praha – 3:5 (0:2; 1:2; 2:1)
- (Czech Republic) HC Sparta Praha – (Switzerland) HC Davos – 6:4 (1:2; 3:1; 2:1)
- (Switzerland) HC Davos – (Finland) Kärpät – 1:6 (0:1; 1:3; 0:2)

Final

- (Czech Republic) HC Sparta Praha – (Russia) Metallurg Magnitogorsk – 2:5 (1:1; 1:2; 0:2)

== Predecessors ==
=== European Cup (1965–1997) ===
The European Cup, also known as the Europa Cup, was a European ice hockey club competition for champions of national leagues which was contested between 1965 and 1997.

==== Medals 1965-1996 (Including Precursors) ====
Rank	Nation	Gold	Silver	Bronze	Total
1	Russia	22	6	2	30
2	Czech Republic	4	13	7	24
3	Finland	3	4	9	16
4	Sweden	3	4	7	14
5	Germany	0	4	12	16
6	Austria	0	1	3	4
7	Italy	0	0	1	1
7	Netherlands	0	0	1	1
7	Norway	0	0	1	1
Totals (9 entries)		32	32	43	107

Note: 11 Editions since 1965/66 to 1977/78 have 2 Semifinalists (Exclude 1973–74 IIHF European Cup and 1977–78 IIHF European Cup).

=== European Hockey League (1996–2000) ===
The European Hockey League was a European ice hockey club competition which ran between the years 1996 and 2000.

==== Medals 1996-2000 ====
Rank	Nation	Gold	Silver	Bronze	Total
1	Russia	2	3	0	5
2	Finland	1	0	1	2
3	Austria	1	0	0	1
4	Czech Republic	0	1	1	2
5	Germany	0	0	1	1
5	Sweden	0	0	1	1
Totals (6 entries)		4	4	4	12

=== IIHF Continental Cup (1997–present) ===
The Continental Cup is an ice hockey tournament for European clubs, begun in 1997 after the discontinuing of the IIHF European Cup. It was intended for teams from countries without representatives in the European Hockey League, with participating teams chosen by the countries' respective ice hockey associations.

=== IIHF Super Cup (1997–2000) ===
The IIHF Super Cup was an ice hockey event played between the champions of the two main European club tournaments at the time; it began in 1997 and ended in 2000.

== Successors ==
=== IIHF Champions Hockey League (2008–2009) ===
The Champions Hockey League was conducted by 14 teams of which 12 are in the group stage. It replaced the IIHF European Champions Cup in 2008. The league was staged for one year only.

=== Champions Hockey League (2014–present) ===
On December 9, 2013, the IIHF officially announced that they had launched a new tournament with a similar name as their previous tournament, born out of the European Trophy, starting in the 2014–15 season.

== See also ==
- Ice Hockey European Championships
- Champions Hockey League
- Champions Hockey League (2008–09)
- IIHF Continental Cup
- IIHF Super Cup
- Spengler Cup
- European Trophy
- Junior Club World Cup
