= Adrian Wichser =

Swiss ice hockey player

- Born: March 18, 1980 (age 46) Winterthur, Switzerland
- Height: 5 ft 11 in (180 cm)
- Weight: 187 lb (85 kg; 13 st 5 lb)
- Position: Centre
- Shot: Left
- Played for: Kloten Flyers; HC Lugano; ZSC Lions; SC Rapperswil-Jona Lakers
- National team: Switzerland
- NHL draft: 231st overall, 1998; Florida Panthers
- Playing career: 1997–2018

Adrian Wichser (born March 18, 1980) is a retired Swiss ice hockey winger, who played for different clubs in the Swiss National League A (NLA), including EHC Kloten, HC Lugano, ZSC Lions and Rapperswil-Jona Lakers. He won the Swiss national championship in 2003 and 2008 as well as the Champions Hockey League in 2009. Wichser was the leading scorer of the NLA in the 2002-03 campaign.

Internationally, he won 99 caps for the Swiss men's national team, participating in the 2006 Winter Olympics and five World Championships.

He announced his retirement in April 2018 and became a skill coach.

== Career statistics ==
=== Regular season and playoffs ===
			Regular season					Playoffs
Season	Team	League	GP	G	A	Pts	PIM	GP	G	A	Pts	PIM
1996–97	EHC Winterthur	SUI.3	22	9	11	20		—	—	—	—	—
1997–98	EHC Kloten	NDA	35	6	5	11	31	7	0	1	1	6
1997–98	EHC Winterthur	SUI.3
1998–99	EHC Kloten	NDA	40	11	14	25	14	9	7	0	7	8
1998–99	EHC Kloten	SUI U20	—	—	—	—	—	1	1	2	3	0
1999–2000	EHC Kloten	NLA	33	8	15	23	12	6	2	1	3	0
2000–01	Kloten Flyers	NLA	31	9	9	18	12	9	2	3	5	0
2001–02	Kloten Flyers	NLA	41	18	27	45	18	11	4	4	8	2
2002–03	HC Lugano	NLA	44	26	17	43	4	15	2	2	4	2
2003–04	HC Lugano	NLA	47	17	20	37	12	16	6	7	13	2
2004–05	HC Lugano	NLA	43	8	18	26	39	5	0	2	2	2
2005–06	ZSC Lions	NLA	33	11	15	26	10	—	—	—	—	—
2006–07	ZSC Lions	NLA	36	4	20	24	28	7	1	5	6	0
2007–08	ZSC Lions	NLA	46	10	40	50	50	17	5	10	15	4
2008–09	ZSC Lions	NLA	44	7	31	38	6	—	—	—	—	—
2009–10	ZSC Lions	NLA	33	9	22	31	10	7	2	3	5	0
2009–10	GCK Lions	SUI.2	2	1	1	2	0	—	—	—	—	—
2010–11	ZSC Lions	NLA	35	3	10	13	4	5	0	1	1	2
2011–12	GCK Lions	SUI.2	17	1	7	8	4	—	—	—	—	—
2011–12	Rapperswil–Jona Lakers	NLA	25	2	11	13	2	—	—	—	—	—
2012–13	Rapperswil–Jona Lakers	NLA	41	5	19	24	2	—	—	—	—	—
2013–14	Rapperswil–Jona Lakers	NLA	36	3	14	17	8	—	—	—	—	—
2014–15	HC Thurgau	SUI.2	40	5	17	22	6	4	0	3	3	6
2015–16	HC Thurgau	SUI.2	28	3	7	10	8	7	1	1	2	4
2016–17	EHC Winterthur	SUI.2	35	4	23	27	16	—	—	—	—	—
2017–18	EHC Winterthur	SUI.2	42	3	12	15	6	—	—	—	—	—
NDA/NLA totals			642	157	307	464	262	114	31	39	70	28
SUI.2 totals			164	17	67	84	40	11	1	4	5	10

=== International ===
Year	Team	Event	GP	G	A	Pts	PIM
1996	Switzerland	EJC	5	1	0	1	2
1997	Switzerland	EJC	5	0	5	5	0
1998	Switzerland	WJC	7	1	3	4	0
1998	Switzerland	EJC	6	1	2	3	4
1999	Switzerland	WJC	6	2	1	3	2
2000	Switzerland	WJC	7	5	1	6	4
2002	Switzerland	WC	6	2	0	2	0
2003	Switzerland	WC	7	1	1	2	0
2004	Switzerland	WC	6	1	2	3	0
2005	Switzerland	OGQ	3	0	1	1	4
2005	Switzerland	WC	5	0	3	3	0
2006	Switzerland	OG	6	0	0	0	2
2007	Switzerland	WC	7	1	3	4	2
Junior totals			36	10	12	22	12
Senior totals			40	5	10	15	8
