= Viatcheslav Nazarov =

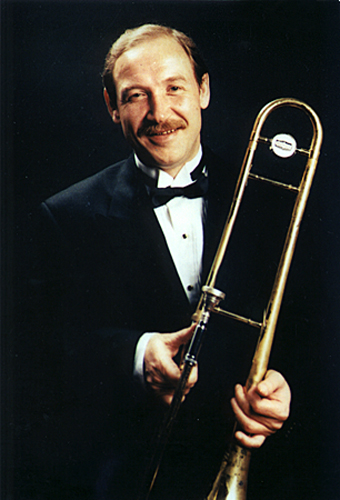
Viatcheslav Nazarov 1952 - 1996

Viatcheslav Sergeyevich Nazarov (Russian: Вячеслав Серге́евич Назаров; June 3, 1952 in Ufa, Soviet Union – January 2, 1996 in Denver, Colorado) was a world-class jazz trombonist, pianist, and vocalist, whose extraordinary performance was recognized by jazz musicians and critics in Russia and in the United States (Vyacheslav and Viacheslav are improper his English spelling).

Nazarov graduated from the Military Music School and Musical College of Ufa. He started to play professionally in a variety of famous Soviet jazz bands when he was 16. He played in KADANS, a group led by German Lukianov, in 1977. By 1983, Nazarov was the leading soloist in the Oleg Lundstrem Orchestra, of which Igor Butman was also a member. In 1989, he and Butman played in the jazz ensemble Allegro led by Nick Levinovsky. In 1990, Nazarov worked for the ensemble Melodia. With those bands, he toured nationally and played at jazz festivals abroad. Along with Viatcheslav Preobrazhensky, he assembled a quintet and recorded two disks. Soviet jazz critics recognized Nazarov as the number one trombonist of the country for eight years.

In 1990 Nazarov immigrated to the United States. He tried to play in a variety of groups in New York, NY and in Denver, CO. He played with jazz stars such as Lew Tabackin, Benny Golson, Valery Ponomarev, Carl Fontana, Freddy Cole and more. In 1995, Nazarov and the new Allegro participated in the JVC jazz festival in Avery Fisher Hall in New York. He died in a car accident near Denver, CO, on January 2, 1996, returning home after Christmas and New Year's eve gigs in Connecticut.

== Discography ==
- Maxim Dunayevsky. The Three Musketeers, musical. Athos — V. Nazarov. (1981) Melodia
- Jazz 82. VIII Moscow Jazz Festival (Disk 1). With Oleg Lundstrem Orchestra. (1983) Melodia
- Oleg Lundstrem Orchestra. In a Mellow Tone. (1982) Melodia
- Oleg Lundstrem Orchestra. Nowadays. (1982) Melodia
- Autumn Rhythms’ 84. From the Concerts of Leningrad Jazz Festival. With Ensemble 'Kadans'. (1985) Melodia
- Autumn Rhythms’ 85. From the Concerts of Leningrad Jazz Festival. (Disk 1). Viatcheslav Nazarov Trio. 1985 Melodia
- Jazz Ensemble ‘Allegro’. Golden Mean. (1985) Melodia
- Jazz Ensemble ‘Allegro’. Sphinx. (1986) Melodia
- Sergei Gurbelashvili. Simple and Involved. (1986) Melodia
- Autumn Rhythms’ 87. From the Concerts of Leningrad Jazz Festival. (Disk 1). Viatcheslav Nazarov Jazz Quartet. (1988) Melodia
- Sergei Gurbelashvili. Breeze. (1989) Melodia
- Nikolai Levinovsky. Five novels. (1989) Melodia
- Viatcheslav Preobrazhensky and Viatcheslav Nazarov Jazz Quintet. Back Address. (1990) Melodia
- Viatcheslav Preobrazhensky. Only Yesterday… (1991) Melodia
- Jazznost: Moscow — Washington. Jazz Summit 1991. (1991) Elephant Music
- Memory of Viatcheslav Nazarov (1999) IMB Music (Disk not published)
