= Zilya Valeeva =

Russian Tatar politician

Zilya Valeeva Зи́ля Вале́ева
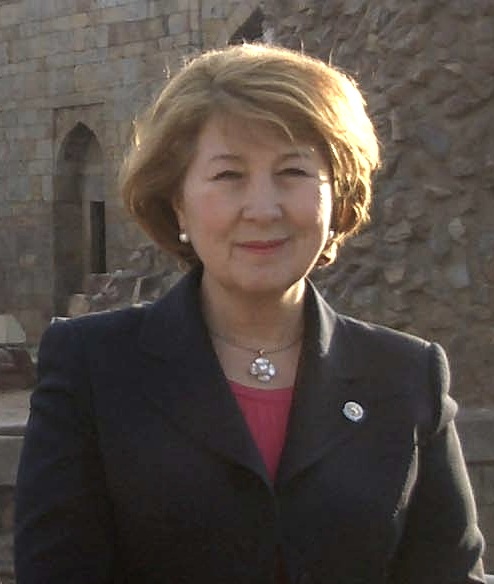
- Zilya Valeeva, Director for State Museum Historic and Architectural Complex of the Kazan Kremlin, Chairwoman of public organization The Women of Tatarstan, Chairwoman for Commission of the Republic of Tatarstan on UNESCO

Deputy Prime Minister of Republic of Tatarstan
- In office 2001–2012

Deputy Prime Minister - Minister of Culture of Republic of Tatarstan
- In office 2005–2011
- Preceded by: Ildus Tarkhanov
- Succeeded by: Airat Sibagatullin

Minister of press, broadcasting and mass media of the Republic of Tatarstan
- In office 1999–2001

Deputy Chairman of State Council of Republic of Tatarstan
- In office 1995–1999

First Deputy Chairman of the Supreme Soviet of Republic of Tatarstan
- In office 1992–1995

Personal details
- Born: Zilya Rakhimyanovna Valeeva; 15 October 1952 (age 74) Ufa, Bashkortostan, Russian Federation
- Education: Moscow State University, (degree in Journalism); Kazan Federal University, (PhD in Philosophical Sciences)

Zilya Valeeva (Zilya Rakhimyanovna Valeeva; born 15 October 1952 in Ufa, Republic of Bashkortostan Russia) is a former politician and public official in the Republic of Tatarstan, and a cultural official in the Russian Federation. She holds a PhD in Philosophical Sciences from Kazan Federal University.

For 20 years, from 1992–2012, she served as one of the first female politicians of the Republic of Tatarstan, traditionally regarded as one of the most patriarchal Muslim regions in the Russian Federation.

Currently, Valeeva works as the Director of the State Museum Historic and Architectural Complex of the Kazan Kremlin. She also serves as chairwoman for the public organization The Women of Tatarstan, as well as chairwoman for the Commission of the Republic of Tatarstan on UNESCO

== Biography ==
1970–1980 — Correspondent, later Head of Literature and Art Department of the republican youth newspaper Leninets (Ufa);

1980–1982 — Correspondent of the Evening Kazan newspaper (Kazan);

1982–1990 — Correspondent, Head of Department on Social Issues at Sovetskaya Tatariya (Russian: Советская Татария) newspaper, which was later renamed Republic of Tatarstan (Kazan);

1990–1992— Editor on politics at News of Tatarstan newspaper (Kazan);

1992–1995 — First Deputy Chairman of the Supreme Soviet of Republic of Tatarstan;

1995–1999 — Deputy Chairman of State Council of the Republic of Tatarstan;

1999–2001 — Minister of press, broadcasting and mass media of the Republic of Tatarstan;

2001–2005 — Deputy Prime Minister of the Republic of Tatarstan;

2005–2011 — Deputy Prime Minister - Minister of Culture of the Republic of Tatarstan;

March 2011–May 2012 — Deputy Prime Minister of the Republic of Tatarstan;

Since 17 May 2012 — Director of State Museum Historic and Architectural Complex of the Kazan Kremlin.

== Awards ==
- The Medal for Valorous Labor;
- The Letter of Honor of Republic of Tatarstan (2002);
- Medal "In Commemoration of the 300th Anniversary of Saint Petersburg" (2003);
- Medal "In Commemoration of the 1000th Anniversary of Kazan" (2005);
- Letter of appreciation on behalf of the President of the Republic of Tatarstan (2007);
- Order of Friendship (2008);
- State Russian Federation award on the Culture recipient (2009).
