= Vadym Rubel =

Rubel Vadym A.
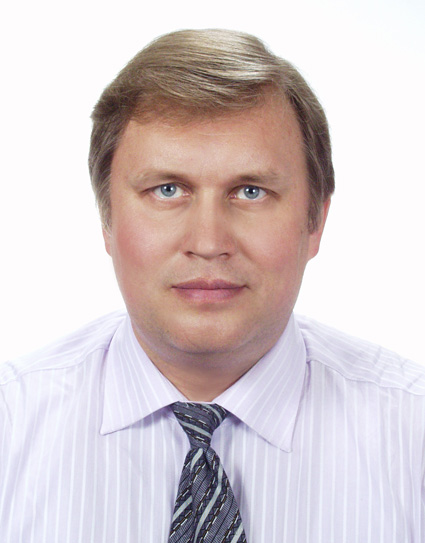
- Born: June 19, 1966; Ufa, USSR
- Citizenship: Ukraine
- Education: Kyiv Shevchenko University
- Known for: orientalists
- Scientific career
- Fields: history
- Workplaces: Kyiv Shevchenko University

Vadym A. Rubel (born 19 June 1966) is a Ukrainian historian of the history of Japan, the civilizations of the Classic East and pre-Columbian America and the political history of the Far East. Doctor of science (History) (1999), professor (2002). Graduated from faculty of history of Taras Shevchenko University of Kiev.

== Life ==
1990-1993, he was lecturer of the department of Ancient and Medieval History of Taras Shevchenko University of Kiev. In 1993 he defended his Ph.D. thesis on the topic of "Political and historical concepts of Medieval Japan XIII – first half of XIV century". 1993-1994 he worked as a diplomat in the Department of Countries of Asia and the Pacific Rim in the Ministry for Foreign Affairs of Ukraine.

In 1994 he came back to teaching at the faculty of history of Taras Shevchenko National University of Kiev. Since 1995 – associate professor, since 2000 – professor of the department of Ancient and Medieval History. In 1999 he defended the thesis on the topic “Origin of the military samurai State system in Traditional Japan (middle I millennium B.C. – XIV cent. A.D.)”, which became the first doctoral thesis in the field of the study of Japan in Ukrainian historical science. He has published about 90 scientific and educational works on History, Philology, Literature and Politology in the field of Orientalism and pre-Columbian Americanology. Author of scientific publications on Japanese, Korean, Chinese, Arabic, Islamic, African and Indianistic studies.

He published the first textbook in Ukraine on the history of the History of Medieval East (2002) and the first textbook in Ukraine on the history of civilizations of pre-Columbian America (2005), in which he explained the mechanism of the support of social stability social systems of Ancient Indians through the system of strict compliance of status and material welfare given to every individual with the directly proportional quantity of demonstrative sacrificial obligations. He published two summarizing monographs on the modern history of Asia and Africa (2007, 2010), in which he developed and implemented in the scientific circle the concept of post-Middle Ages as a specific and integral epoch in the history of civilizations of Classic East. On the basis of personal studies of many years he developed and implemented in the scientific circle a new system of transcription of Japanese words by means of Ukrainian language. On the basis of personal author’s system of transcription of Japanese words by means of Ukrainian language developed for the first time Ukrainian theme reader for university course “The History of Medieval East” (2011).

== Main works ==
- Рубель В. А. Японська цивілізація: традиційне суспільство і державність. — Київ: Аквілон-Прес, 1997. — 256 с. [Japan Civilization: Traditional Society and Statehood / Rubel V.A. – Kiev: Akvilon-Pres, 1997. – 256 p. – Ukrainian]. (in Ukrainian)
- Рубель В. А. Історія середньовічного Сходу: Підручник. — Київ: Либідь, 2002. — 736 с. [The History of Medieval East: Textbook / Rubel V.A. – Kiev: Lybid, 2005. – 736 p. – Ukrainian]. (in Ukrainian)
- Shevchenko Olga. The Stories of bygone years / Edited by V.A. Rubel: Manual for post-graduates and students of Humanities. — Kyiv: «Yurydychna Knyha» Publishing House, 2003. — 464 p.
- Історія цивілізацій Доколумбової Америки / Рубель В.А. – Київ: Либідь, 2005. – 504 с. [The History of civilizations of pre-Columbian America / Rubel V.A. – Kiev: Lybid, 2005. – 504 p. – Ukrainian]. (in Ukrainian)
- Нова історія Азії та Африки: Постсередньовічний Схід (XVIII – друга половина XIX ст.) / Рубель В.А. – Київ: Либідь, 2007. – 560 с. [The New History of Asia and Africa: post-Medieval East (XVIII – the second part of XIX century) / Rubel V.A. – Kiev: Lybid, 2007. – 560 p. – Ukrainian]. (in Ukrainian)
- Китай / Рубель В.А. // Енциклопедія історії України: У 8 т. – Київ: Наукова думка, 2007. – Т. 4. Ка-Ком. – С. 305-312. [China / Rubel V.A. // The Encyclopedia of History of Ukraine: In 8 vol. – Kiev: Scientific View, 2007. – V. 4. – P. 305-312. – Ukrainian]. (in Ukrainian)
- Транскрибування японських слів засобами української мови: проблеми і пропозиції / Рубель В.А. // Східний світ. – 2009. – № 4. – С. 151-156. [Transcription of the Japanese Words by Means of the Ukrainian Language: Problems and Offers / Rubel V.A. // The World of the Orient. – 2009. – № 4. – Р. 151-156. – Ukrainian]. (in Ukrainian)
- Нова історія Азії та Африки: Колоніальний Схід (кінець XIX – друга третина XX ст.) / Головченко В.І., Рубель В.А. – Київ: Либідь, 2010. – 520 с. [The New History of Asia and Africa: the Colonial East (end of XIX – second third of XX century) / Holovchenko V.I., Rubel V.A. – Kiev: Lybid, 2010. – 520 p. – Ukrainian]. (in Ukrainian)
- Історія Середньовічного Сходу: Тематична хрестоматія / Рубель В.А. – Київ: Либідь, 2011. – 792 с. [The History of Medieval East: Theme Reading Book / Rubel V.A. – Kiev: Lybid, 2011. – 792 p. – Ukrainian]. (in Ukrainian)
