= Juraj Faith =

Slovak ice hockey player

- Born: 14 March 1976 (age 50) Košice, Czechoslovakia
- Height: 5 ft 10 in (178 cm)
- Weight: 187 lb (85 kg; 13 st 5 lb)
- Position: Forward
- Shot: Left
- Played for: HC Košice; HK Spišská Nová Ves; Scorpions de Mulhouse; Wölfe Freiburg; HK Poprad; HKm Zvolen; MHC Martin; MsHK Žilina; MHk 32 Liptovský Mikuláš; DVTK Jegesmedvék; HC Nové Zámky; HK Dukla Michalovce
- Playing career: 1994–2017

Juraj Faith (born 14 March 1976) is a Slovak former professional ice hockey forward.

Faith played in the Slovak Extraliga for HC Košice, HK Spišská Nová Ves, HK Poprad, HKm Zvolen, MHC Martin, MsHK Žilina and MHk 32 Liptovský Mikuláš. He also played in the Deutsche Eishockey Liga for Wölfe Freiburg, the Ligue Magnus for Scorpions de Mulhouse and the English Premier Ice Hockey League for the Manchester Phoenix.

== Personal life ==
His father Jan Faith played professional ice hockey for HC Košice and the Czechoslovakia national team.
