= Ruslan Nurtdinov =

Russian ice hockey player (born 1980)

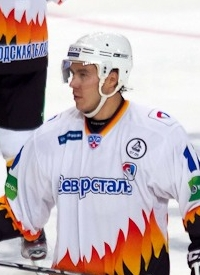
- Nurtdinov in 2011
- Born: March 30, 1980 (age 46) Ufa, Russian SFSR, Soviet Union
- Height: 5 ft 9 in (175 cm)
- Weight: 163 lb (74 kg; 11 st 9 lb)
- Position: Left wing
- Shot: Right
- Played for: Salavat Yulaev Ufa; SKA Saint Petersburg; Severstal Cherepovets; Ak Bars Kazan; Metallurg Magnitogorsk; Amur Khabarovsk; Neftekhimik Nizhnekamsk; Metallurg Novokuznetsk
- Playing career: 1998–2016

Ruslan Nailevich Nurtdinov (Russian: Руслан Наильевич Нуртдинов; born March 30, 1980) is a Russian former professional ice hockey winger.

Nurtdinov played for Salavat Yulaev Ufa, SKA Saint Petersburg, Severstal Cherepovets, Ak Bars Kazan, Metallurg Magnitogorsk, Amur Khabarovsk, Neftekhimik Nizhnekamsk and Metallurg Novokuznetsk.

== Career statistics ==
			Regular season					Playoffs
Season	Team	League	GP	G	A	Pts	PIM	GP	G	A	Pts	PIM
1995–96	Nowoil Ufa	Russia2	12	1	0	1	0	—	—	—	—	—
1996–97	Nowoil Ufa	Russia3	30	7	10	17	14	—	—	—	—	—
1997–98	Salavat Yulaev Ufa	Russia	2	0	0	0	0	—	—	—	—	—
1997–98	Nowoil Ufa	Russia3	28	8	5	13	10	—	—	—	—	—
1998–99	Salavat Yulaev Ufa	Russia	34	1	3	4	6	1	0	0	0	0
1998–99	Nowoil Ufa	Russia3	8	10	6	16	4	—	—	—	—	—
1999–00	Salavat Yulaev Ufa	Russia	38	8	3	11	34	—	—	—	—	—
1999–00	Salavat Yulaev Ufa-2	Russia3	2	3	0	3	4	—	—	—	—	—
2000–01	Salavat Yulaev Ufa	Russia	43	8	8	16	12	—	—	—	—	—
2000–01	Salavat Yulaev Ufa-2	Russia3	2	4	2	6	0	—	—	—	—	—
2001–02	SKA St. Petersburg	Russia	28	8	5	13	4	—	—	—	—	—
2002–03	Severstal Cherepovets	Russia	50	18	16	34	32	12	2	2	4	2
2003–04	Ak Bars Kazan	Russia	52	11	16	27	10	8	2	1	3	0
2004–05	Salavat Yulaev Ufa	Russia	29	5	4	9	26	—	—	—	—	—
2004–05	Severstal Cherepovets	Russia	24	5	3	8	4	—	—	—	—	—
2004–05	Severstal Cherepovets-2	Russia3	1	0	0	0	0	—	—	—	—	—
2005–06	Metallurg Magnitogorsk	Russia	45	17	20	37	6	11	0	0	0	2
2006–07	Metallurg Magnitogorsk	Russia	43	4	13	17	10	7	0	1	1	4
2007–08	Salavat Yulaev Ufa	Russia	40	11	5	16	12	15	2	0	2	4
2008–09	Salavat Yulaev Ufa	KHL	42	8	5	13	26	1	0	0	0	0
2009–10	Salavat Yulaev Ufa	KHL	30	6	3	9	10	10	0	0	0	4
2010–11	Amur Khabarovsk	KHL	50	8	4	12	16	—	—	—	—	—
2011–12	Severstal Cherepovets	KHL	47	13	7	20	16	6	1	1	2	2
2012–13	Severstal Cherepovets	KHL	16	1	3	4	8	—	—	—	—	—
2012–13	HC Neftekhimik Nizhnekamsk	KHL	12	2	3	5	0	1	0	0	0	0
2013–14	Metallurg Novokuznetsk	KHL	8	0	0	0	0	—	—	—	—	—
2013–14	HC Kuban	VHL	29	8	5	13	16	5	2	2	4	2
2014–15	Sputnik Nizhny Tagil	VHL	42	8	13	21	33	7	3	2	5	2
2015–16	Sputnik Nizhny Tagil	VHL	32	10	7	17	30	—	—	—	—	—
KHL totals			205	38	25	63	76	18	1	1	2	6
Russia totals			428	96	96	192	156	56	6	4	10	12
