= Ruslan Abdrakhmanov =

Russian professional ice hockey player

- Born: December 25, 1984 (age 40); Ufa, Russia
- Height: 5 ft 10 in (178 cm)
- Weight: 168 lb (76 kg; 12 st 0 lb)
- Position: Forward
- Shoots: Left
- Kazakhstan team Former teams: HK Almaty; Salavat Yulaev Ufa; Toros Neftekamsk; Amur Khabarovsk; Ermak Angarsk; Sputnik Nizhny Tagil; Kristall Saratov; Dizel Penza
- NHL draft: Undrafted
- Playing career: 2003–present

Ruslan Abdrakhmanov (born December 25, 1984) is a Russian professional ice hockey player. He is currently playing with HK Almaty of the Kazakhstan Hockey Championship.

Abdrakhmanov played 10 games in the Kontinental Hockey League with Amur Khabarovsk during the 2008–09 season. He also appeared in 17 games in the Russian Superleague, the top-level Russian league prior to the KHL's foundation, during the 2003–04 and 2004–05 seasons.
