= Rafael Khakimov =

Russian ice hockey player

- Born: June 4, 1990 (age 35) Ufa, Russian SFSR
- Height: 5 ft 11 in (180 cm)
- Weight: 174 lb (79 kg; 12 st 6 lb)
- Position: Goaltender
- Catches: Left
- VHL team Former teams: Neftyanik Almetievsk; Metallurg Novokuznetsk; Salavat Yulaev Ufa; Neftekhimik Nizhnekamsk; Severstal Cherepovets
- Playing career: 2012–present

Rafael Khakimov (born June 4, 1990) is a Russian professional ice hockey goaltender. He is currently playing with Neftyanik Almetievsk of the Supreme Hockey League (VHL).

Khakimov made his Kontinental Hockey League debut playing with Metallurg Novokuznetsk during the 2014–15 KHL season.
