= Grigory Svirsky =

Russian-born Canadian writer (1921–2016)

Grigory Tsezarevich Svirsky (Russian: Григорий Цезаревич Свирский) (September 29, 1921 – 2016) was a Russian-born Canadian writer.

Svirsky was born in Ufa in September 1921. He was a military pilot during World War II from 1941 to 1944, then worked as a journalist. After publishing several books, Svirsky openly criticized censorship in the Soviet Union, and all his writings were forbidden and destroyed in 1968. Svirsky also criticized the 1968 suppression of the Prague Spring by Soviet military forces. He was forced to emigrate to Israel on the personal request from KGB director Yuri Andropov in 1972.

He published numerous fiction and non-fiction books, short stories, and plays. He was also an active participant of political discussions in RuNet, Russian blogosphere.

One of his recent books was about the Internet brigades - teams of FSB agents who conduct psychological operations in the internet against political bloggers. These "internet brigades" allegedly disseminate disinformation and prevent free discussion of undesirable subjects in the internet forums by harassing and intimidating the bloggers He was interested in moral aspects of their work: "It seems that offending, betraying, or even "murdering" people in the virtual space is easy. This is like killing an enemy in a video game: one do not see a disfigured body or eyes of the person who is dying right in front of you. However, human soul lives by its own basic laws that force it to pay the price in the real life".

He died in 2016.

== External links (Russian) ==
- Photo
- His biography
- His biography and links to some books
- Memories about him
- Links to his books
- Interview with G. Svirsky in "Nasha Canada" - Toronto russian newspaper

== His books ==
- Dead end of Lenin, Moscow, Publishing house "Soviet writer", 1962. Full text in Russian
- Hostages: The personal testimony of a Soviet Jew. Vintage/Ebury (A Division of Random House Group), 1976, ISBN 0-370-10328-9. Full text in Russian
- Polar tragedy, Frankfurt, "Posev", 1976. Full text in Russian, French translation: Tragedie Polarie, Quine, Montreal, 1978.
- Breakthrough, New York, 1983. ISBN 5-86090-141-0 Four chapters in Russian, Hebrew translation: Hapriza by Maoz, Israel, 1990.
- At the execution place. The literature of moral resistance, 1946-1986. Moscow, 1992. Full text in Russian English version: A history of post-Soviet writing (The literature of the Moral Opposition), Ardis, Ann Arbor, USA, 1981, ISBN 0-88233-449-2.
- Soviet penal battalions Full text in Russian
- Luba means "love" or never-ending Nord-Ost. A non-fiction story. Jerusalem, 2004 Full text in Russian
- Anastasya. A story on-line (Full text in Russian)
- Farewell to Russia, New York, 1986 ISBN 0-938920-80-4 Full text in Russian
- Mother and stepmother, "Scholar", Toronto, Canada, 1990. ISBN 1-895399-01-7 Full text in Russian
- Forbidden story, "Scholar", Toronto, Canada, 1990. Full text in Russian
- Escape, Jerusalem, 1994 Full text in Russian
- Little Andrei, Moscow, 1998. Full text in Russian
- On the islands of George Washington, New York, 1998 Full text in Russian
- Fuel pump kings. Russian gangsters in America 2000. Full text in Russian
- Masters of disguise. A story of Russian leaders. Moscow. 2002. ISBN 5-900816-48-6 Full text in Russian
- My Galich, a story of Alexander Galich Full text in Russian
