= 2008 Victoria Cup =

Series of ice hockey games in 2008

Victoria Cup
	1	2	3	Total
Metallurg Magnitogorsk (KHL)	2	1	0	3
New York Rangers (NHL)	0	1	3	4
- Date: October 1, 2008
- Arena: PostFinance Arena
- City: Bern, Switzerland
- Attendance: 13,794 (80.5% full)

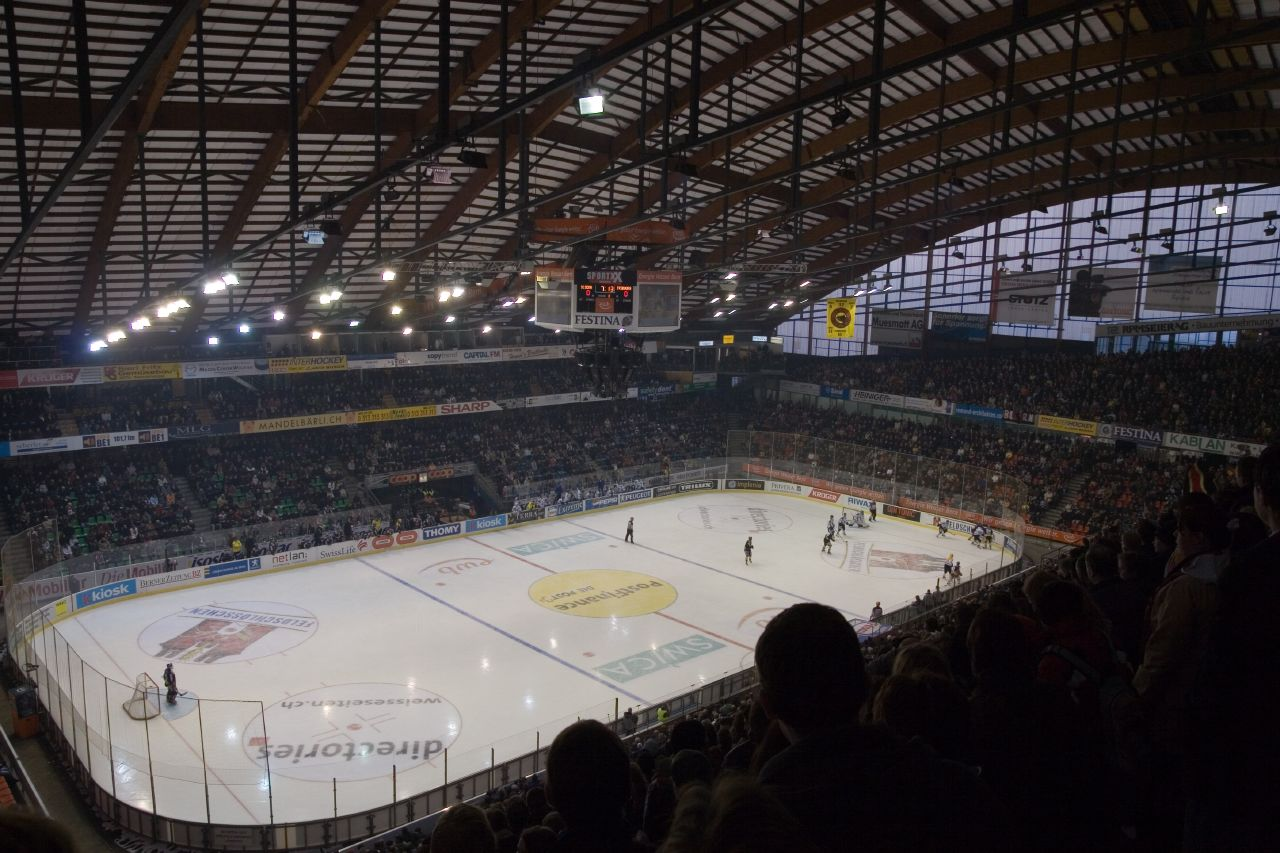
The PostFinance Arena, where the first Victoria Cup was played.

The 2008 Victoria Cup was the first edition of the Victoria Cup challenge, played on October 1, 2008, between the 2008 European Champions Cup winners, Metallurg Magnitogorsk, and the New York Rangers of the National Hockey League (NHL), at the PostFinance Arena in Bern, Switzerland. The game was played under IIHF rules. The Rangers won the challenge as they battled from a 3–0 deficit to win the game 4–3.

The match was preceded on September 30, 2008, by an exhibition between host SC Bern and the New York Rangers, meant to commemorate the centennial of the Swiss Ice Hockey Association. However the additional game, the first ever between a Swiss team and an NHL team, ended up competing with the main event at the box office. With tickets steeply priced, neither game sold out and a number of Swiss fans favored the SC Bern game, which drew a significantly larger audience (16,022) than the actual Victoria Cup game.

The New York Rangers defeated SC Bern in this game 8–1. The Rangers followed the Victoria Cup game with two NHL regular season games against the Tampa Bay Lightning in Prague, Czech Republic, on October 4 and 5 at the O_{2} Arena. Both games were won 2–1 by the Rangers.

== Game description ==
The goalies in the game were Henrik Lundqvist for the New York Rangers and Andrei Mezin for Metallurg Magnitogorsk.

At 1:28 of the first period, Metallurg's Denis Platonov scored a goal past Lundqvist to give them the lead. With 18:07 gone in the first, with the Rangers' Paul Mara in the box for holding, Vladimir Malenkikh made it 2–0 for Magnitogorsk on the power-play.

In the second period, Nikolai Zavarukhin scored another power-play goal at 30:20 to give Magnitogorsk a 3–0 lead over New York, this time with Petr Prucha in the box for holding. Late in the second, Metallurg ran into penalty trouble as Alexei Kaigorodov and Zavarukhin found their way to the box for holding. The two-man power-play led to a goal at 39:37 for Chris Drury.

In the third, penalty troubles continued to plague Magnitogorsk. At 45:45 Dan Fritsche scored for the Rangers to make the score 3–2. Then, with Metallurg's Stanislav Chistov in the penalty box for hooking, Drury scored his second power play goal of the game at 50:13. With the score tied 3–3, the Rangers were badly outshooting Metallurg. In the last minute, Ryan Callahan picked off a sloppy pass by defenseman Vladimir Malenkikh at Metallurg's blue line and came in alone on goalie Mezin. In a "shoot-out move", he faked a backhand shot, switched to his forehand and managed to wrap the puck around Mezin's outstretched right leg for the game-winning goal at 59:40.

Lundqvist stopped 22 of 25 shots for the win, while Mezin stopped 40 of 44 shots for Magnitogorsk. According to Lundqvist, "I think we should have won the game, and we did. I think we were the better team. They got some easy goals the first period and made it tough on us. That's on me, but the way we came back in this game was great to see. I think we learned a lot. It gave us confidence moving forward, and now we don't have to hear about it."

The Victoria Cup Trophy was accepted on behalf of the team by Nikolai Zherdev and Dmitri Kalinin, the two Russian players on the Rangers. The Rangers received $1,000,000 for their victory.

=== SC Bern vs New York Rangers ===
September 30, 2008; 18:00 UTC+1	SC Bern (Switzerland)	1–8 (0–2, 0–0, 1–6)	(United States) New York Rangers	PostFinance Arena

Game reference

Jonas Muller
Marco Buhrer
Goalies
Stephen Valiquette
Referees:
(Canada) Don Koharski
(Sweden) Marcus Vinnerborg

	0–1	04:30 – D. Girardi (PP)
	0–2	18:28 – W. Redden (PP)
T. Roche – 41:02	1–2
	1–3	43:55 – C. Drury (PP)
	1–4	44:22 – D. Bubinsky (PP)
	1–5	51:35 – P. Pucha
	1–6	52:35 – L. Korpikoski
	1–7	55:31 – C. Potter
	1–8	58:47 – B. Dubinsky

18 min
Penalties
12 min
46
Shots
22

== Game summary ==
=== Scoring summary ===
Period	Team	Goal	Assist(s)	Time	Score
1st	MET	Denis Platonov (1)	Stanislav Chistov (1)	1:28	0–1 MET
1st	MET	Vladimir Malenkikh (1) (PP)		18:27	0–2 MET
2nd	MET	Nikolai Zavarukhin (1)	Vitali Atyushov (1), Jan Marek (1)	30:20	0–3 MET
2nd	NYR	Chris Drury (1)(PP)	Nikolai Zherdev (1)	39:37	1–3 NYR
3rd	NYR	Dan Fritsche (1)	Michal Rozsíval (1)	45:45	2–3 NYR
3rd	NYR	Chris Drury (2) (PP)	Scott Gomez (1), Markus Näslund (1)	50:13	3–3 NYR
3rd	NYR	Ryan Callahan (1)		59:40	4–3 NYR

=== Penalty summary ===
Period	Team	Player	Penalty	Time	PIM
1st	NYR	Dan Fritsche	Interference	2:39	2:00
1st	MET	Vadim Ermolayev	Hooking	6:23	2:00
1st	NYR	Markus Näslund	Holding	9:43	2:00
1st	NYR	Paul Mara	Holding	16:19	2:00
2nd	MET	Evgeni Biryukov	Interference	26:27	2:00
2nd	NYR	Petr Průcha	Holding	29:17	2:00
2nd	MET	Vadim Ermolayev	Hooking	31:48	2:00
2nd	NYR	Markus Näslund	Hooking	32:17	2:00
2nd	NYR	Wade Redden	Interference	34:09	2:00
2nd	MET	Alexei Kaigorodov	Hooking	39:25	2:00
2nd	MET	Nikolai Zavarukhin	Hooking	39:28	2:00
3rd	MET	Vitali Atyushov	Slashing	42:19	2:00
3rd	MET	Stanislav Chistov	Hooking	49:20	2:00
3rd	MET	Evgeni Varlamov	Tripping	50:50	2:00
3rd	NYR	Ryan Callahan	Roughing	55:37	2:00
3rd	MET	Karel Pilař	Roughing	55:37	2:00

== Team rosters ==
Metallurg Magnitogorsk
#		Player	Position
27	(Russia)	Vitali Atyushov	D
48	(Russia)	Evgeni Biryukov	D
26	(Russia)	Vladislav Bulin	D
23	(Russia)	Stanislav Chistov	F
32	(Russia)	Vadim Ermolayev	F
79	(Russia)	Evgeni Fedorov	F
34	(Russia)	Ravil Gusmanov	F
5	(Russia)	Rinat Ibragimov	D
55	(Russia)	Alexei Kaigorodov	F
29	(Russia)	Denis Khlystov	F
21	(Czech Republic)	Jaroslav Kudrna	F
24	(Russia)	Vladimir Malenkikh	D
15	(Czech Republic)	Jan Marek	F
31	(Belarus)	Andrei Mezin	G
92	(Czech Republic)	Karel Pilař	D
39	(Russia)	Denis Platonov	F
73	(Russia)	Ilya Proskuryakov	G
60	(Czech Republic)	Tomáš Rolinek	F
40	(Russia)	Alexander Seluyanov	D
14	(Russia)	Alexei Simakov	F
36	(Russia)	Evgeni Varlamov	D
11	(Russia)	Nikolai Zavarukhin	F
(Russia)		Head coach: Valeri Belousov	

New York Rangers
#		Player	Position
15	(Canada)	Blair Betts	F
24	(United States)	Ryan Callahan	F
10	(Canada)	Nigel Dawes	F
23	(United States)	Chris Drury	F
17	(United States)	Brandon Dubinsky	F
49	(United States)	Dan Fritsche	F
5	(Canada)	Dan Girardi	D
19	(United States)	Scott Gomez	F
45	(Russia)	Dmitri Kalinin	D
29	(Finland)	Lauri Korpikoski	F
30	(Sweden)	Henrik Lundqvist	G
27	(United States)	Paul Mara	D
91	(Sweden)	Markus Näslund	F
28	(Canada)	Colton Orr	F
33	(United States)	Corey Potter	D
25	(Czech Republic)	Petr Průcha	F
6	(Canada)	Wade Redden	D
12	(United States)	Patrick Rissmiller	F
3	(Czech Republic)	Michal Rozsíval	D
18	(Canada)	Marc Staal	D
40	(Canada)	Stephen Valiquette	G
13	(Russia)	Nikolai Zherdev	F
(Canada)		Head coach: Tom Renney	

- Ilya Proskuryakov dressed for the Metallurg Magnitogorsk as the back-up goalie and did not enter the game.
- Stephen Valiquette dressed for the New York Rangers as the back-up goalie and did not enter the game.

Source
Magnitogorsk, New York

=== Officials ===
- Referees – (Canada) Dan Ohalloran, (Finland) Jyri Rönn
- Linesmen – (Canada) Lonnie Cameron, (Finland) Stefan Fonselius

== René Fasel of IIHF ==
We agreed that the Rangers would be the optimal club to represent the NHL in the first Victoria Cup, The Rangers were the first ever NHL club to play against a European team when they met CSKA Moscow in New York on December 28, 1975. They have been one of the NHL teams that have most often shown enthusiasm to go overseas and there is no doubt that many Europeans fans will have no problems identifying with the heavy international presence that the club has. But first and foremost, the New York Rangers are one of the most identifiable clubs in all of hockey and professional sports.

— René Fasel

Out of several choices we worked with, in the end nobody had the credentials of SC Bern and its arena. SC Bern is one of the best-organised hockey clubs in Europe, they are in a successful phase and their fans are maybe the best in the world. Of the many options we had to consider for the Victoria Cup, we felt Bern had earned the right to host this inaugural event because of its devoted fan support.

— René Fasel
