= Victory Song =

Victory Song may refer to:

- Victory Song, 1945 Japanese film by Kenji Mizoguchi and Kinuyo Tanaka
- Victory Song (horse), 1947 American Harness Horse of the Year

== Music ==
- "The Victory Song", Mattie E. Allen Frank W. Ford 1919
- Pitt Victory Song
- Eagles Victory Song fight song of the Philadelphia Eagles
- "Go, Cubs, Go", Chicago Cubs victory song
- New York Rangers Victory Song 1940 by J. Fred Coots
- "Under the Southern Cross I Stand", victory song of the Australian cricket team
- Victory Songs, album by Ensiferum
