= Rinat Ibragimov =

Rinat Ibragimov may refer to:

- Rinat Ibragimov (ice hockey) (born 1986), Russian ice hockey player
- Rinat Ibragimov (judoka) (born 1986), Russian judoka
- Rinat Ibragimov (musician) (1960–2020), Russian musician
