= Andrei Mezin =

Belarusian ice hockey player and coach

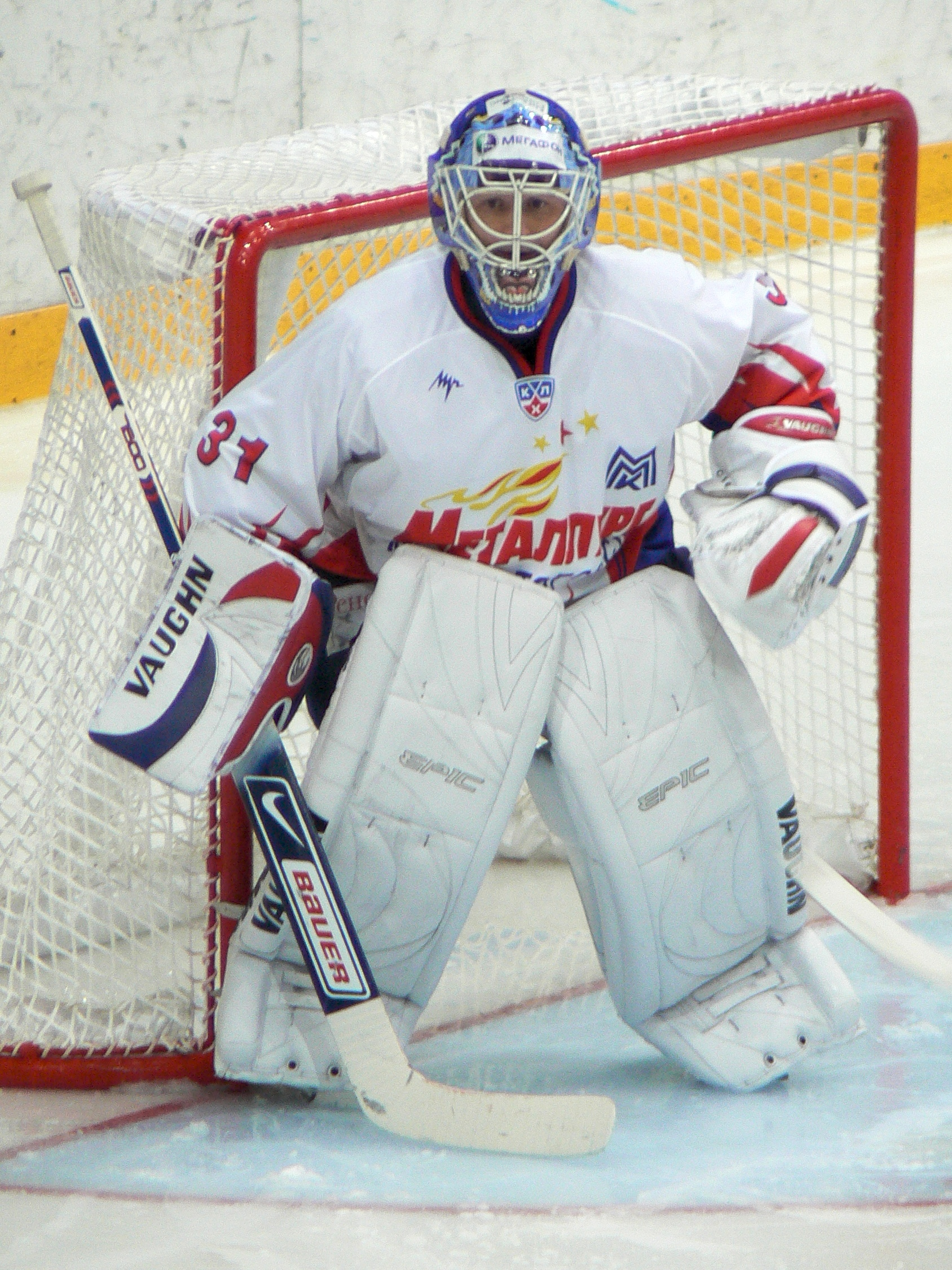
- Born: 8 July 1974 (age 52) Chelyabinsk, Russian SFSR, Soviet Union
- Height: 6 ft 0 in (183 cm)
- Weight: 173 lb (78 kg; 12 st 5 lb)
- Position: Goaltender
- Caught: Left
- KHL team: Traktor Chelyabinsk
- National team: Belarus
- Playing career: 1993–2014

Andrei Anatolyevich Miezin (Belarusian: Андрэй Анатольевiч Мезiн, Russian: Андрей Анатольевич Мезин; born 8 July 1974) is a Belarusian ice hockey coach and a retired goaltender.

== Playing career ==
Mezin left his native Belarus in 1993 to head to North America and would spend five seasons playing in different leagues, including the American Hockey League, the International Hockey League and the United Hockey League. From 1998 to 2002, he played in Germany: one year with the Nürnberg Ice Tigers and three with the Berlin Capitals. He then played in Russia and the Czech Republic. Starting 2008, he spent time with KHL teams HC Dinamo Minsk, Lokomotiv Yaroslavl, Traktor Chelyabinsk and Avangard Omsk.

Mezin gained international attention in 2002 as a member of the Belarus national men's ice hockey team at the 2002 Winter Olympics. Despite not winning a game in the Group D round robin, Belarus beat the Sweden national men's ice hockey team in the quarterfinals. Mezin was stellar, holding a star-laden Swedish team to three goals on more than 50 shots. The game was won by Belarus late in the third on a long shot gaffe made by Tommy Salo in the Swedish net. Belarus ended up finishing in fourth place after losing to Canada in the semifinals. Mezin has represented the Belarus national team at the 1998, 2002 and 2010 Olympic Games and played several World Championships.

On 1 October 2008 Mezin and Metallurg Magnitogorsk faced the New York Rangers of the NHL in the inaugural Victoria Cup. Mezin stopped 40 out of 44 shots, playing a very respectable game in the 4–3 loss.

Mezin retired in 2014.

== Coaching career ==
He has been serving as goaltender coach of HC Dinamo Minsk of the Kontinental Hockey League (KHL) since 2016.

== Off the ice ==
In the offseason, Mezin lives in Kyiv, Ukraine.

== Career statistics ==
			Regular season											Playoffs
Season	Team	League	GP	W	L	T	MIN	GA	SO	GAA	SV%	Pts	PIM	GP	W	L	MIN	GA	SO	GAA	SV%	Pts	PIM
1993–94	Roanoke Express	ECHL	1	0	1	0	18	1	0	3.28	0.667	0	2	--	--	--	--	--	--	--	--	--	--
1995–96	Flint Generals	CoHL	40	27	9	2	2270	132	1	3.49	0.883	1	2	7	5	1	410	18	1	2.64	0.903	0	0
1995–96	Fort Wayne Komets	IHL	1	?	?	?	35	1	0	1.72	0.958	0	0	--	--	--	--	--	--	--	--	--	--
1996–97	Flint Generals	CoHL	25	19	4	1	1416	58	2	2.46	0.902	0	8	4	0	2	175	13	0	4.46	?	0	0
1996–97	Las Vegas Thunder	IHL	10	4	5	0	490	33	0	4.04	0.883	0	0	--	--	--	--	--	--	--	--	--	--
1996–97	Rochester Americans	AHL	7	3	3	1	386	31	0	4.82	0.843	1	0	--	--	--	--	--	--	--	--	--	--
1997–98	Flint Generals	UHL	27	21	5	0	1488	86	1	3.47	0.885	2	4	8	?	?	?	?	?	?	?	1	2
1997–98	Detroit Vipers	IHL	4	2	1	0	178	8	0	2.69	0.852	1	0	--	--	--	--	--	--	--	--	--	--
1998–99	Nürnberg Ice Tigers	DEL	49	?	?	?	2856	124	5	2.60	0.900	2	32	13	?	?	765	31	0	2.43	0.908	0	27
1999–00	Berlin Capitals	DEL	53	?	?	?	2979	138	4	2.78	0.896	2	72	7	?	?	422	23	0	3.27	0.908	1	0
2000–01	Berlin Capitals	DEL	56	?	?	?	3220	148	3	2.76	0.907	4	26	5	?	?	300	17	0	3.40	0.890	0	12
2001–02	Berlin Capitals	DEL	54	?	?	?	3147	166	4	3.16	0.893	3	58	--	--	--	--	--	--	--	--	--	--
2001–02	Berlin Capitals	DEL - Abstiegsrunde	6	?	?	?	?	?	?	3.17	0.894	0	0	?	?	?	?	?	?	?	?	?	?
2002–03	Ak Bars Kazan	RSL	1	0	0	0	1	0	0	0.00	0	0	0	--	--	--	--	--	--	--	--	--	--
2003–04	HC České Budějovice	CzEx	15	4	9	2	805	40	1	2.98	0.904	0	12	--	--	--	--	--	--	--	--	--	--
2003–04	HC České Budějovice	1.liga (CZE)	--	--	--	--	--	--	--	--	--	--	--	4	0	4	250	9	0	2.16	0.900	0	2
2004–05	SKA Saint Petersburg	RSL	42	14	20	5	2328	100	2	2.58	0.910	0	6	--	--	--	--	--	--	--	--	--	--
2005–06	Salavat Yulaev Ufa	RSL	37	16	13	6	2118	68	2	1.93	0.925	2	10	6	3	3	354	16	0	2.71	0.902	0	0
2006–07	Salavat Yulaev Ufa	RSL	19	?	?	?	?	?	?	1.71	0.933	0	4	3	?	?	?	?	?	1.83	0.923	0	0
2007–08	Metallurg Magnitogorsk	RSL	35	?	?	?	?	?	?	1.84	0.932	1	6	3	?	?	?	?	?	2.67	0.892	0	0
2008–09	Metallurg Magnitogorsk	KHL	26	?	?	?	?	?	?	2.82	0.896	0	0	6	?	?	?	?	?	2.27	0.922	0	0
Russian Superleague totals			135	--	--	--	--	--	--	--	--	2	26	12	--	--	--	--	--	2.40	--	0	0
Deutsche Eishockey Liga totals			217	--	--	--	--	--	--	2.80	0.899	11	188	25	--	--	--	--	--	3.03	0.902	1	39
International Hockey League totals			15	--	--	--	703	42	2	2.82	0.898	1	0	--	--	--	--	--	--	--	--	--	--
Colonial Hockey League totals			65	46	13	3	3686	190	3	2.98	0.93	1	10	12	--	--	--	--	--	--	--	0	0

== Awards and honours ==
- Belarus Player of the Year (1998, 1999, 2005, 2006)
- All-Star Team (WC 2006, WC 2009)
