= Chris Drury =

American ice hockey player and executive (born 1976)

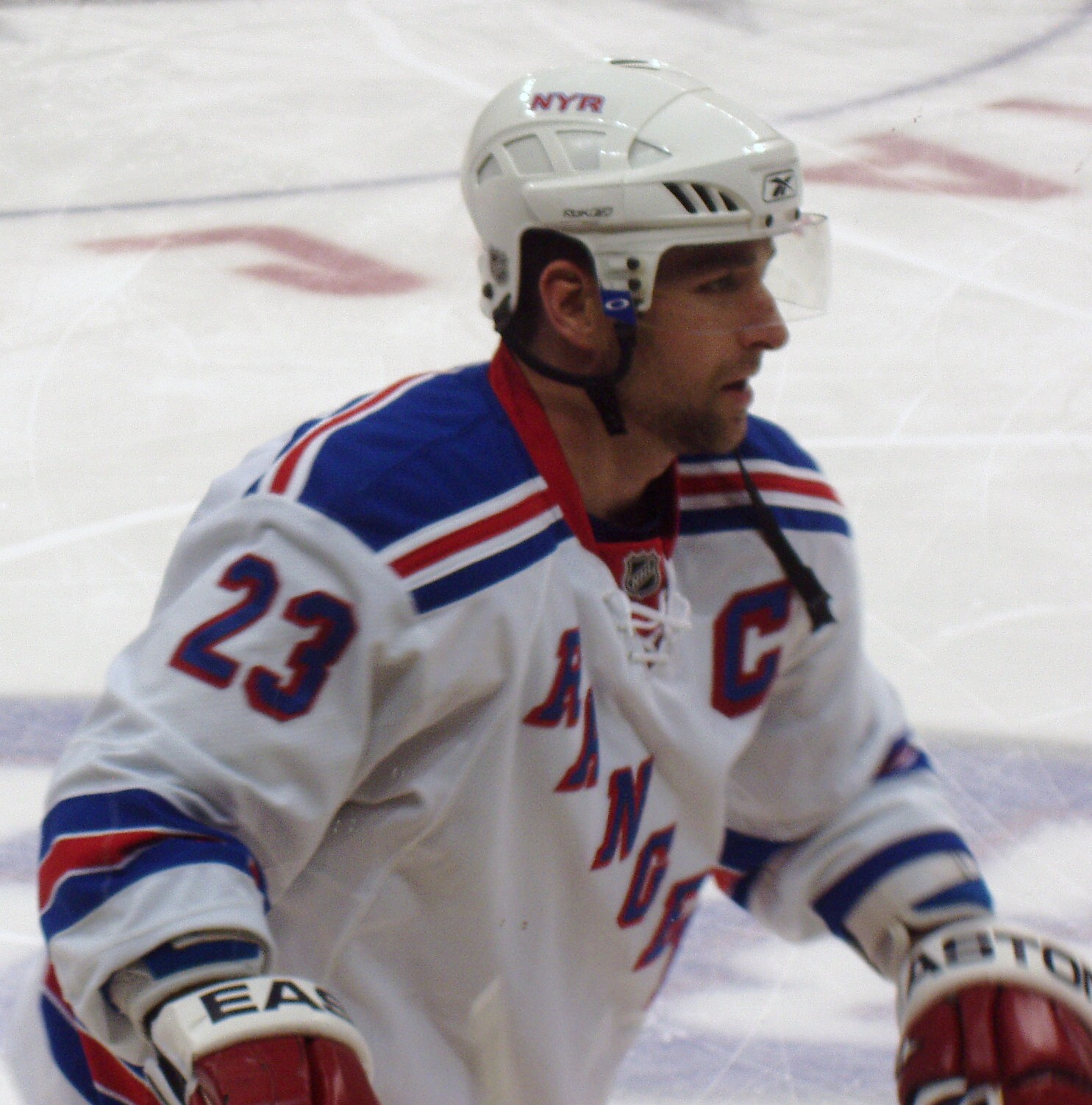
- Drury with the New York Rangers in 2008
- Born: August 20, 1976 (age 50) Trumbull, Connecticut, U.S.
- Height: 5 ft 10 in (178 cm)
- Weight: 190 lb (86 kg; 13 st 8 lb)
- Position: Center
- Shot: Right
- Played for: Colorado Avalanche; Calgary Flames; Buffalo Sabres; New York Rangers
- National team: United States
- NHL draft: 72nd overall, 1994; Quebec Nordiques
- Playing career: 1998–2011
Medal record
Representing United States
Men's ice hockey
Olympic Games
Silver medal – second place	2002 Salt Lake City
Silver medal – second place	2010 Vancouver
World Championships
Bronze medal – third place	2004 Prague

Christopher Ellis Drury (born August 20, 1976) is an American professional ice hockey executive and former player. He has served as the president and general manager for the New York Rangers since May 5, 2021. He previously served as the general manager of the Rangers American Hockey League (AHL) affiliate, the Hartford Wolf Pack.

Drury is a Hobey Baker Award-winner with Boston University, a Calder Memorial Trophy winner with the Colorado Avalanche, a Stanley Cup champion with the Avalanche, a two-time Olympic silver medalist with the United States and a former captain of the Buffalo Sabres and New York Rangers. He was inducted into the United States Hockey Hall of Fame in 2015. As a child, he also won the Little League Baseball World Series Championship with his hometown team from Trumbull, Connecticut.

== Early life ==
Drury excelled at a variety of sports as a child, including hockey and baseball. Playing for his hometown baseball team from Trumbull, Drury pitched a complete game, five-hitter and drove in two runs to win the 1989 Little League World Series championship game against Chinese Taipei. Two months later, Drury threw out the ceremonial first pitch in game 2 of the 1989 World Series. He also met President George H. W. Bush and appeared on Good Morning America in New York City. Drury played in the 1990 Quebec International Pee-Wee Hockey Tournament with a minor ice hockey team from Rye, New York.

Drury played many sports simultaneously; before winning the Little League World Series with Trumbull, he won a national pee wee championship with his hockey team from Bridgeport the same year. Along with his older brother Ted, he attended Fairfield College Preparatory School. He was co-captain of the varsity hockey team in his senior year, receiving Connecticut all-state honors for his efforts on the ice. Chris and Ted are the only players in Fairfield Prep's hockey history to have their numbers retired. The number 18, which they both wore, hangs above the school's home rink at the Wonderland of Ice in Bridgeport in the old rink, as well as in the lobby outside the locker room complex at Fairfield Prep itself. Chris' name and number are also painted above the entrance doors to the Classic arena at the same ice rink.

== Playing career ==
=== Boston University (1994–1998) ===
After graduating from Fairfield College Preparatory School, Drury was drafted by the Quebec Nordiques 72nd overall in the third round of the 1994 NHL entry draft. Upon being drafted, he began a four-year career at Boston University (BU). In his freshman year in 1995, he won a national championship with BU. In both 1997 and 1998 he was named Hockey East's player of the year and was also named best defensive forward in 1998. In his senior year, he won the Hobey Baker Award as the National Collegiate Athletic Association (NCAA)'s top ice hockey player after finishing as the runner-up the previous season. Drury was the first BU player to reach 100 career goals and assists, finishing with 113 and 100, respectively. BU won the Beanpot tournament all four years he played for them. On January 15, 2009, well into his NHL career, Drury was named Hockey East's Best Defensive Forward, as part of the league's 25th Anniversary celebration. Drury was chosen in a vote of Hockey East fans and members of the league's 25th Anniversary Committee.

=== NHL ===
==== Colorado Avalanche (1998–2002) ====
Drury began his NHL career there in 1998–99. Recording 44 points in his first season, Drury was awarded the Calder Memorial Trophy as the league's top rookie. In so doing, he became the first player in history to have won both the Hobey Baker Award and the Calder Trophy.

After a 65-point season in 2000–01, Drury won the Stanley Cup with the Avalanche, adding 16 points in the playoffs. Drury became a fan favorite with the Avalanche crowd primarily due to his clutch play during playoffs. He had a total of 11 game-winning goals in four straight playoff seasons in Colorado. Avalanche captain Joe Sakic once said of Drury, "You want a goal, you're in overtime – you want him." Because of his penchant for game-winning goals, Drury was often referred to as one of the best clutch players in the NHL.

Although Drury's production dipped to 46 points in 2001–02, he was named to the U.S. roster for the 2002 Winter Olympics in Salt Lake City. Though he did not record any points in the tournament, the Americans surprised many by making it all the way to the final where they lost to Canada. This was the best finish for the United States at the tournament since the 1980 "Miracle on Ice".

==== Calgary Flames (2002–2003) ====
Before the start of the next season, on October 1, 2002, Drury and Stéphane Yelle were traded to the Calgary Flames in exchange for Derek Morris, Dean McAmmond and Jeff Shantz. Drury recorded 53 points for the Flames during the year, finishing third in team scoring.

==== Buffalo Sabres (2003–2007) ====
Drury spent just one season with the Flames before he was traded on July 3, 2003, along with Steve Bégin, to the Buffalo Sabres in exchange for former Avalanche teammate Steven Reinprecht and Rhett Warrener. Traded twice in two seasons, Drury was admittedly frustrated. However, Drury regained his form and excelled in Buffalo, serving as co-captain with Daniel Brière from 2005 to his departure via free agency in 2007. With his previous numbers (37 with Colorado and 18 with Calgary) both taken in Buffalo, Drury switched to 23 in honor of his childhood hero, New York Yankees first baseman Don Mattingly.

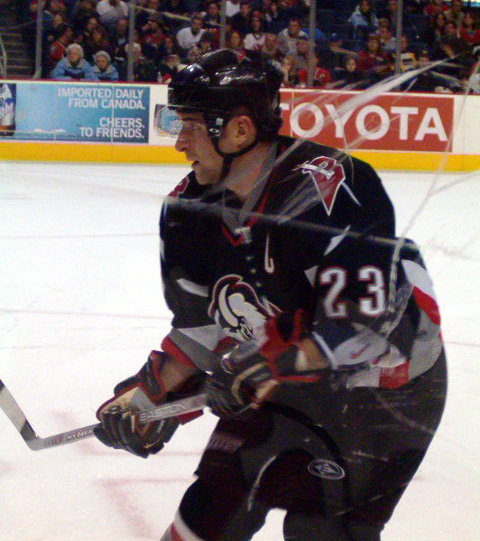
Drury playing for the Buffalo Sabres in 2005

Drury again represented the United States at the 2006 Winter Olympics, where the Americans finished eighth overall.

After a career-high 37-goal, 69-point campaign in 2006–07, the Sabres made a second consecutive run to the Eastern Conference Finals this time as the Presidents' Trophy-winning first seed, where they faced the Ottawa Senators. Proving he could still be a clutch performer, Drury scored two game-winning goals in the first round against the New York Islanders, then scored the game-tying goal in game five of the second round against the New York Rangers with 7.7 seconds left in regulation time. The Sabres won 2–1 in overtime and closed out the series against the Rangers, four games to two. In game four of the conference finals against the Senators, Drury recorded another game-winner to stave off elimination, though the Sabres were eventually defeated four games to one.

==== New York Rangers (2007–2011) ====
In the off-season, Drury and co-captain Daniel Brière both became unrestricted free agents. While Brière signed with the Philadelphia Flyers, on July 1, 2007, Drury signed a five-year, $35.25 million contract with the New York Rangers. He made his Rangers debut against the Florida Panthers, scoring a goal in a 5–2 win. On February 1, 2008, in a game against the New Jersey Devils, Drury scored an empty net goal on the power play for his 500th career point. He finished his first season with the Rangers with 58 points – third in team scoring. Matched up against New Jersey in the first round, Drury scored the game-winning and series-clinching goal to eliminate the Devils in five games. On October 1, 2008, Drury and the Rangers won the Victoria Cup, defeating Metallurg Magnitogorsk by a score of 4–3.

After the departure of Jaromír Jágr from the Rangers to play in the Kontinental Hockey League (KHL), Drury was named the 25th captain in Rangers history on October 3, 2008. Drury was only the second American-born captain in team history (the first was Brian Leetch from 1997 to 2000). This made Drury one of four active NHL players at the time to have captained two different NHL teams (the others were Chris Pronger, Joe Thornton and former teammate Adam Foote).

Drury was named to the United States roster for the 2010 Winter Olympics. Drury, Jamie Langenbrunner and Brian Rafalski were the only members of the 2010 team who had previous Olympic experience. Because of his disappointing play for the Rangers in 2010 (he had spent much of the season on the fourth line, with a pre-Olympics scoring total of 8G-11A-19P and a −14 plus-minus rating), Drury's inclusion on the team was questioned by former Olympian Jeremy Roenick, who said the team might be better served by adding either former Rangers teammate Scott Gomez or T. J. Oshie. On February 21, 2010, Drury scored the go-ahead goal to break a 2–2 tie in a critical round-robin game against Canada. The Americans went on to win 5–3. The Americans lost a rematch to the Canadians in the gold medal game and Drury was awarded an Olympic silver medal for the second time.

In February 2011, Drury underwent arthroscopic surgery on his left knee, missing 6 weeks. At the time of the surgery, he missed 33 games during the season. In June 2011, rumors began circulating that the Rangers were looking to negotiate a contract buyout with Drury. However, these rumors were silenced after it was announced Drury may have a degenerative condition in his left knee which would cause him to miss the entire 2011–12 season.

On June 29, 2011, Drury accepted a buy-out of the final year of his contract to become an unrestricted free agent July 1, 2011. Drury would count approximately $3.716 million against the 2011–12 salary cap, and about $1.667 million against the 2012–13 salary cap. On August 19, 2011, Drury retired as a player.

== Management career ==
In September 2015, the Rangers named Drury their director of player development. In September 2016, Drury was promoted by the Rangers to assistant general manager. The next season, he was also assigned to be the general manager of their American Hockey League (AHL) affiliate, the Hartford Wolf Pack.

In March 2019, the Rangers signed Drury to a contract extension as assistant general manager. On February 5, 2021, Drury was promoted to associate general manager. On May 5, 2021, following the sudden dismissal of John Davidson and Jeff Gorton from the team's front office, Drury was promoted to President and General Manager of the New York Rangers.

In Chris Drury's first offseason as general manager, he made several free agent signings and trades in response to the Tom Wilson incident on May 3, which occurred two days before he took over as general manager. This includes trading for Barclay Goodrow (and later signing him on a six-year deal), signing Patrik Nemeth to a three-year, $7.5 million deal, and signing Ryan Reaves. Although Drury made these signings in response to the Tom Wilson incident, he also faced criticism throughout the offseason, most notably on July 23 when he traded Pavel Buchnevich to the St. Louis Blues for Sammy Blais. His offseason with the Rangers was ranked 23rd by The Athletic, and the Buchnevich trade has been considered as one of the worst trades in franchise history. Despite the Buchnevich trade and criticism for his offseason moves, the Rangers did make the Eastern Conference finals following his trade deadline additions for Andrew Copp, Frank Vatrano, and Justin Braun. Following the season, Drury was named as a finalist for the Jim Gregory General Manager of the Year Award, an award given to the top NHL general manager, along with former teammate and Colorado Avalanche general manager Joe Sakic and Tampa Bay Lightning general manager Julien BriseBois.

== Personal life ==
Drury and his wife Rory have two daughters and a son. The family resides in Greenwich, Connecticut.

Drury's older brother, Ted, played professional hockey in the NHL for six different teams between 1989 and 2001. His nephew, Jack, currently plays professional hockey for the Nashville Predators, after several years with the Colorado Avalanche and the Carolina Hurricanes.

In the late 2000s, Drury, along with partners Ken Martin, Paul Coniglio, and Cody Lee, purchased Colony Grill in Stamford, Connecticut, a pizza tavern established in 1935. Since the purchase, the group has opened four more locations throughout southwestern Connecticut and New York, including Fairfield, Connecticut, near where Drury played high school hockey at Fairfield Prep. Locations have also been opened in the Tampa Bay area of Florida, Maryland, and Virginia.

== Records ==
- The first player in hockey history to win both the Hobey Baker Memorial Award and Calder Memorial Trophy.
- Holds the record for most goals in Boston University men's ice hockey history with 113.
- Only Boston University ice hockey player with at least 100 goals and 100 assists.

== Career statistics ==
=== Regular season and playoffs ===
			Regular season					Playoffs
Season	Team	League	GP	G	A	Pts	PIM	GP	G	A	Pts	PIM
1991–92	Fairfield Prep	HS-CT	25	22	27	49	—	—	—	—	—	—
1992–93	Fairfield Prep	HS-CT	24	25	32	57	15	—	—	—	—	—
1993–94	Fairfield Prep	HS-CT	24	37	18	55	—	—	—	—	—	—
1994–95	Boston University	HE	39	12	15	27	38	—	—	—	—	—
1995–96	Boston University	HE	37	35	32	67	46	—	—	—	—	—
1996–97	Boston University	HE	41	38	24	62	64	—	—	—	—	—
1997–98	Boston University	HE	38	28	29	57	88	—	—	—	—	—
1998–99	Colorado Avalanche	NHL	79	20	24	44	62	19	6	2	8	4
1999–2000	Colorado Avalanche	NHL	82	20	47	67	42	17	4	10	14	4
2000–01	Colorado Avalanche	NHL	71	24	41	65	47	23	11	5	16	4
2001–02	Colorado Avalanche	NHL	82	21	25	46	38	21	5	7	12	10
2002–03	Calgary Flames	NHL	80	23	30	53	33	—	—	—	—	—
2003–04	Buffalo Sabres	NHL	76	18	35	53	68	—	—	—	—	—
2005–06	Buffalo Sabres	NHL	81	30	37	67	32	18	9	9	18	10
2006–07	Buffalo Sabres	NHL	77	37	32	69	30	16	8	5	13	2
2007–08	New York Rangers	NHL	82	25	33	58	45	10	3	3	6	8
2008–09	New York Rangers	NHL	81	22	34	56	32	6	1	0	1	2
2009–10	New York Rangers	NHL	77	14	18	32	31	—	—	—	—	—
2010–11	New York Rangers	NHL	24	1	4	5	8	5	0	1	1	2
NHL totals			892	255	360	615	468	135	47	42	89	46

=== International ===
Year	Team	Event	Result	GP	G	A	Pts	PIM
1996	United States	WJC	5th	6	2	2	4	2
1997	United States	WC	6th	8	0	1	1	2
1998	United States	WC	12th	6	1	2	3	12
2002	United States	OG	2nd place, silver medalist(s)	6	0	0	0	0
2004	United States	WC	3rd place, bronze medalist(s)	9	3	3	6	27
2004	United States	WCH	4th	5	0	0	0	0
2006	United States	OG	8th	6	0	3	3	2
2010	United States	OG	2nd place, silver medalist(s)	6	2	0	2	0
Junior totals				6	2	2	4	2
Senior totals				46	6	9	15	43

== Awards and honors ==
Award	Year	Ref
College
NCAA Division I National Champion	1995	
All-Hockey East All-Star	1995–96	
AHCA East Second-Team All-American	1995–96	
All-Hockey East All-Star	1996–97	
AHCA East First-Team All-American	1996–97	
All-NCAA All-Tournament Team	1997	
All-Hockey East First Team	1997–98	
AHCA East First-Team All-American	1997–98	
Hobey Baker Award	1998	
NHL
All-Rookie Team	1999	
Calder Memorial Trophy	1999	
Stanley Cup champion	2001	
NHL 2K cover athlete	2002	

== See also ==
- Notable families in the NHL

Sporting positions
Preceded by Jaromír Jágr	New York Rangers captain 2008–2011	Succeeded by Ryan Callahan
Preceded by Miroslav Šatan	Buffalo Sabres captain November 2003	Succeeded by James Patrick
Preceded by Daniel Brière	Buffalo Sabres captain March–April 2004	Succeeded by Co-captain with Daniel Brière
Preceded by Himself rotating captaincy ended	Buffalo Sabres captain 2005–2007; With: Daniel Brière	Succeeded by Jochen Hecht rotating captaincy resumed
Awards
Preceded by Jay Pandolfo	Hockey East Player of the Year; 1996–97, 1997–98	Succeeded by Jason Krog
Preceded by Travis Dillabough	Hockey East Best Defensive Forward; 1997–98	Succeeded by Doug Nolan
Preceded by Greg Bullock	Hockey East Scoring Champion; 1995–96, 1996–97	Succeeded by Marty Reasoner / Tom Nolan
Preceded by Brendan Morrison	Winner of the Hobey Baker Award; 1997–98	Succeeded by Jason Krog
Preceded by Sergei Samsonov	Winner of the Calder Memorial Trophy; 1999	Succeeded by Scott Gomez
