= History of the New York Rangers =

The history of the New York Rangers began in 1926 when the National Hockey League (NHL) granted a franchise to Tex Rickard, the founder of the team. The Rangers experienced early success, winning the Stanley Cup in only their second season of existence, and would go on to win two more in the next 12 years.

After their Stanley Cup win in 1940, the Rangers then suffered through one of the longest championship droughts in NHL history, which became known as the Curse of 1940. The 54-year drought ended with a Stanley Cup win in 1994 by a team led by captain Mark Messier, Brian Leetch, Adam Graves and Mike Richter, all of whose numbers have since been retired by the team.

== Early years and the Original Six era (1926–1967) ==
In 1925–26, the New York Americans joined the NHL, playing in Madison Square Garden. The "Amerks" proved to be a greater success than expected, leading Garden president Tex Rickard to seek his own franchise for the Garden, despite promising the Amerks they would be the only hockey team to play there.

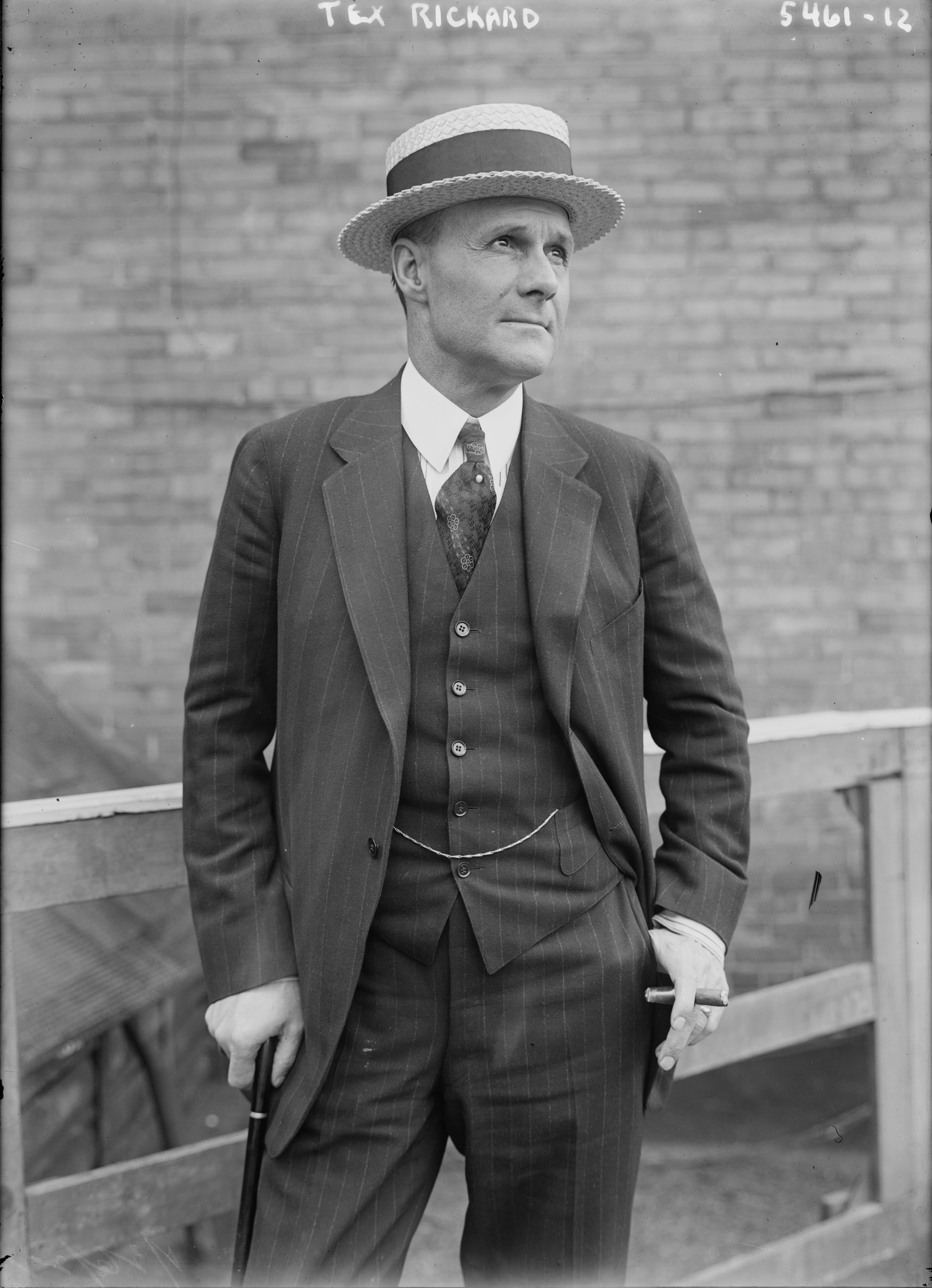
Tex Rickard, president of Madison Square Garden, was awarded the Rangers in 1926.

Tex Rickard was granted a franchise, which was originally incorporated under the name "New York Giants Professional Hockey Club" during a league meeting with NHL president Frank Calder on April 17, 1926, but during the meeting the name was then changed to "New York Rangers Hockey Club." The origin of the "Rangers" name is attributed to George Haley, the sports editor of the New York Herald Tribune, as he coined the new team as "Tex's Rangers" because of Rickard's decision to bring a new NHL team to New York.

At the time, there was no expansion draft in the NHL to help new teams ice competitive rosters, which in any other year would have made assembling a playoff contender extremely difficult. However, 1926 also happened to be the year the NHL's last major rival of its early era (the Western Hockey League) went out of business, so there was an abundance of top-caliber hockey talent searching for new clubs. The owners of the Rangers' expansion cousins (the Detroit Cougars and Chicago Black Hawks) opted to purchase entire WHL rosters (the Victoria Cougars and Portland Rosebuds respectively) to stock their teams. Smythe eschewed this approach, opting instead to sign who he felt were the best players from the remaining four WHL teams as well as a few NHL castaways he felt the other teams had misjudged.

Smythe had a falling-out with Rickard's hockey man, Col. John S. Hammond, and was fired as manager-head coach on the eve of the first season; he was paid a then-hefty $10,000 to leave. Smythe was replaced by Pacific Coast Hockey Association co-founder Lester Patrick, who kept all of the players Smythe had assembled. Smythe's approach to building the team paid quick dividends, as Rangers turned out to be a winner. The Rangers won the American Division title their first year, but lost to the Boston Bruins in the playoffs. The team's early success led to players becoming minor celebrities and fixtures in New York City's "Roaring Twenties" nightlife. It was also during this time, playing at the Garden on 48th Street, blocks away from Times Square, the Rangers obtained their now-famous nickname "The Broadway Blueshirts".

In only their second season, the Rangers won the Stanley Cup, defeating the Montreal Maroons three games to two. One of the most memorable stories that emerged from the finals involved Patrick playing in goal at age 44. At the time, teams were not required to dress a backup goaltender, so when the Rangers' starting goaltender Lorne Chabot left a game with an eye injury, Maroons head coach Eddie Gerard vetoed his original choice for a replacement (who was Alex Connell, another NHL goaltender of the old Ottawa Senators who was in attendance for the game). An angry Patrick lined up between the pipes for two periods in game two of the Stanley Cup Final, allowing one goal to Maroons center Nels Stewart. Frank Boucher would score the game-winning goal in overtime for New York. An expansion team would not come this far this fast in North American professional sports until the Philadelphia Atoms won the North American Soccer League title in their first year of existence.

=== 1930s ===
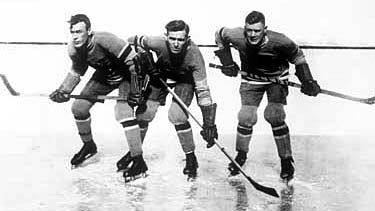
The Bread Line was the Rangers' first notable line. Consisting of Bill Cook, Bun Cook and Frank Boucher, they played together from 1926 to 1937.

After a loss to the Boston Bruins in the 1929 Stanley Cup Final and a few mediocre seasons in the early 1930s, the Rangers, led by the brothers Bill and Bun Cook on the right and left wings, respectively, and Frank Boucher at center, would defeat the Toronto Maple Leafs in the 1932–33 best-of-five finals, three games to one, to win their second Stanley Cup, exacting revenge against the Leafs' "Kid line" of Busher Jackson, Joe Primeau and Charlie Conacher. The Rangers would spend the rest of the 1930s playing close to .500 hockey until their next Stanley Cup win. Lester Patrick stepped down as head coach and was replaced by Frank Boucher.

In 1939–40, the Rangers finished the regular season in second place behind the Boston Bruins. The two teams would meet in the first round of the playoffs. The Bruins gained a two-games-to-one series lead from the Rangers until they recovered to win three straight games, defeating the first-place Bruins four games to two. The Rangers' first-round victory gave them a bye until the finals. The Detroit Red Wings disposed of the New York Americans in their first round best-of-three series two games to one (even as the Americans had analytical and notorious ex-Bruins star Eddie Shore) and the Toronto Maple Leafs ousted the Chicago Black Hawks two games to none. The Maple Leafs and Red Wings would play a best-of-three series to determine who would go on to play the Rangers in the Cup Final. The Maple Leafs swept the Red Wings and the finals match-up was determined. The 1940 Stanley Cup Final started in Madison Square Garden in New York. The first two games went to the Rangers. In Game 1, the Rangers needed overtime to gain a 1–0 series lead, but they won Game 2 more easily with a 6–2 victory. The series then headed to Toronto where the Maple Leafs won the next two games, tying the series 2–2. In Games 5 and 6, the Rangers won in overtime. They took the series four games to two to earn their third Stanley Cup.

=== Original Six era (1942–1967) ===
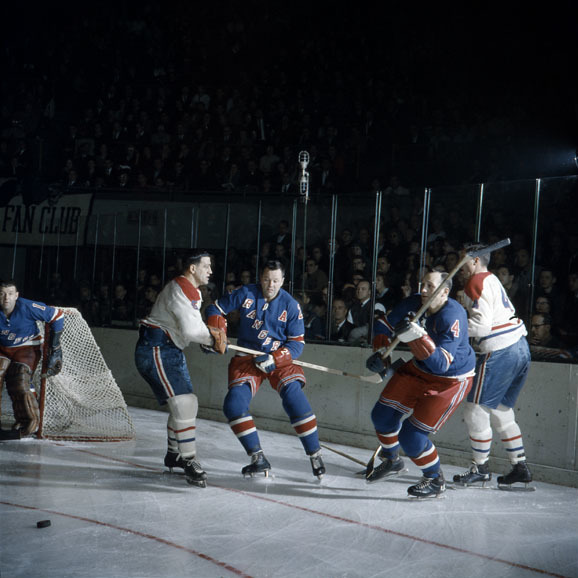
A game between the Rangers and the Montreal Canadiens, 1962.

The Rangers would collapse by the mid-1940s, winning 41 games (out of 200) between 1942 and 1946. In the 1943–44 season, the team posted its worst ever record (as of 2021), when they finished 6–39–5. During the year, goaltender Ken McAuley posted a 6.24 goals against average (GAA) in 50 games played, which included a 15–0 loss to the Detroit Red Wings, which remains an NHL record for most consecutive goals by one team in one game. They would miss the playoffs for five consecutive seasons before squeaking into the fourth and final playoff spot in 1947–48. They lost in the first round and would miss the playoffs again in 1948–49. In the 1950 Stanley Cup Final, the Rangers were forced to play all of their games on the road (home games in Toronto) while the circus was at the Garden. They would end up losing to the Detroit Red Wings in overtime in the seventh game of the finals, despite a stellar first-round performance as underdogs to the Montreal Canadiens.

During this time, Red Wings owner James E. Norris became the largest stockholder in the Garden. However, he did not buy controlling interest in the arena, which would have violated the NHL's rule against one person owning more than one team. Nonetheless, he had enough support on the board of directors to exercise de facto control.

== Expansion era (1967–1993) ==
The Rangers missed the playoffs in 12 of the next 16 seasons. However, the team was rejuvenated in the late 1960s, symbolized by moving into a newly rebuilt Madison Square Garden in 1968. A year earlier, they had made the playoffs for the first time in five years on the strength of rookie goaltender Eddie Giacomin and acquired 1950s Montreal Canadiens star right wing Bernie "Boom Boom" Geoffrion.

The Rangers made the finals twice in the 1970s, but lost both times to two 1970s powerhouses; in six games to the Boston Bruins in 1972, who were led by such stars as Bobby Orr, Phil Esposito, Ken Hodge, Johnny Bucyk and Wayne Cashman; and in five games to the Canadiens in 1979, who had Bob Gainey, Guy Lafleur, Larry Robinson, Ken Dryden, Guy Lapointe and Serge Savard. This time the Rangers had Esposito, but it didn't matter, as the Canadiens were dominant.

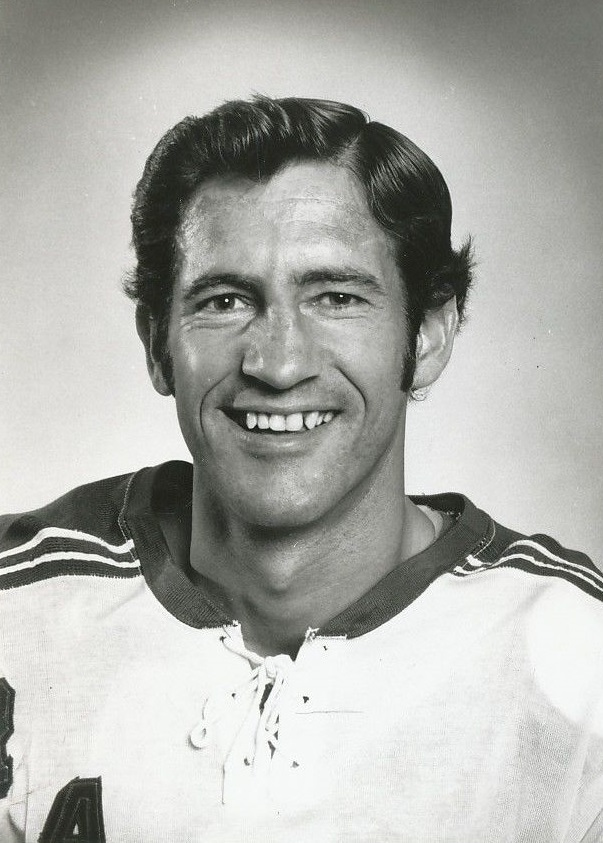
Jean Ratelle played with the Rangers from 1960 to 1975, helping the Rangers reach the playoffs during the expansion era.

By 1971–72, the Rangers reached the Stanley Cup Final despite losing high-scoring center Jean Ratelle (who had been on pace over Bruin Phil Esposito to become the first Ranger since Bryan Hextall in 1942 to lead the NHL in scoring) to injury during the stretch drive of the regular season. The strength of players like Brad Park, Ratelle, Vic Hadfield and Rod Gilbert (the last three constructing the famed "GAG line", meaning "goal-a-game") would still carry them through the playoffs. They would defeat the defending-champion Canadiens in the first round and the Chicago Blackhawks in the second, but lost to the Bruins in the finals.

The Rangers played a legendary semi-final series against the Philadelphia Flyers in the 1973–74 playoffs. This series was noted for a Game 7 fight between Dale Rolfe of the Rangers and Dave Schultz of the Flyers. Schultz pummeled Rolfe without anyone on the Rangers lifting a finger to protect him (the GAG line was on the ice at the time). This led to the belief the Rangers of that period were soft, especially when taking into account the bullying endured by the Rangers during the 1972 finals. One example is Gilbert's beating at the hands of Derek Sanderson of the Bruins.

Their new rivals, the New York Islanders, who entered the NHL in the 1972–73 season after paying a huge territorial fee — some $4 million — to the Rangers, were their first-round opponent in 1974–75. After splitting the first two games, the Islanders defeated the more-established Rangers 11 seconds into overtime of the deciding Game 3, establishing a rivalry that continued to grow for years.

After some off years in the mid-to-late 1970s, they picked up Esposito and Carol Vadnais from the Bruins for Park, Ratelle, and Joe Zanussi in 1975–76. Swedish stars Anders Hedberg and Ulf Nilsson jumped to the Rangers from the maverick World Hockey Association (WHA). In 1978–79, they defeated the surging Islanders in the semi-finals and would return to the finals again before bowing out to the Canadiens. However, the Islanders got their revenge, eliminating the Rangers in four consecutive playoff series starting in 1980–81 en route to their second of four consecutive Stanley Cup titles.

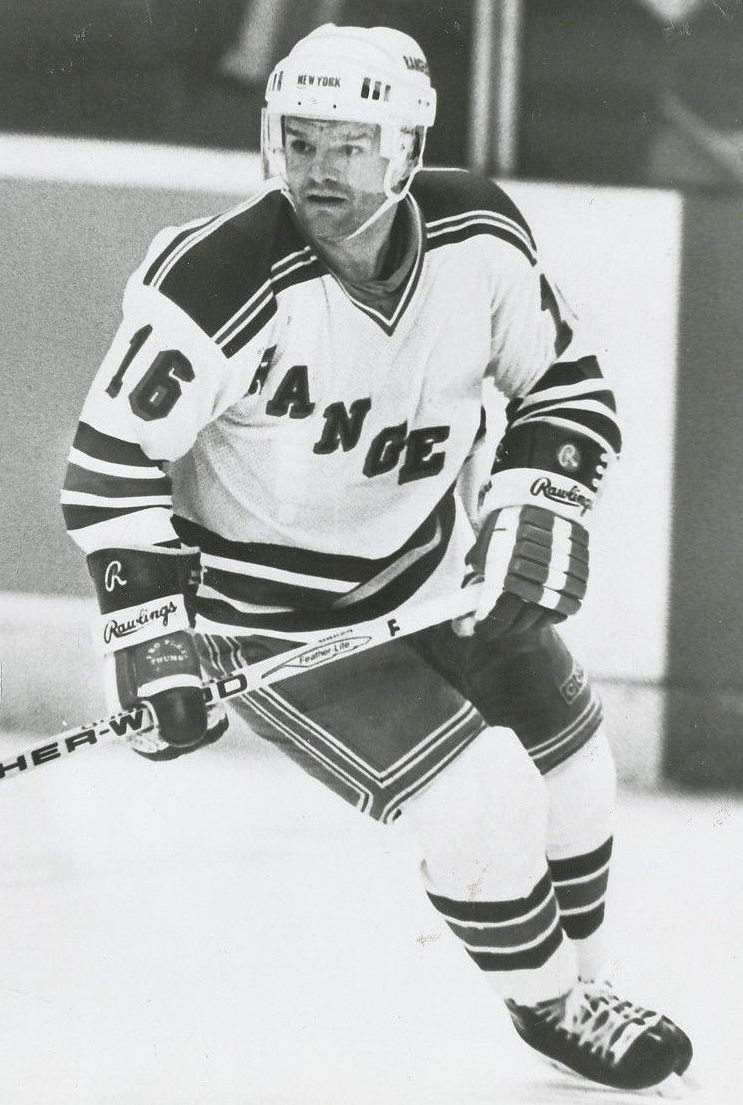
Marcel Dionne with the Rangers, 1987.

The Rangers stayed competitive through the 1980s and early 1990s, making the playoffs each year save for one, but never going very far. An exception was 1985–86, when the Rangers, behind rookie goaltender John Vanbiesbrouck, upended the Patrick Division-winning Flyers in five games followed by a six-game win over the Washington Capitals in the Patrick Division Finals. Montreal disposed of the Rangers in the Wales Conference Finals behind a rookie goaltender of their own, Patrick Roy. The Rangers then acquired superstar center Marcel Dionne after almost 12 years as a Los Angeles King the next year. In 1988, Dionne moved into third place in career goals scored (since bettered by Brett Hull). But Dionne's always-churning legs started to slow the next year, thereby ensuring that his goals came further and further apart. "Because you love the game so much, you think it will never end," said Dionne, who spent nine games in the minors before retiring in 1989. He would only play 49 playoff games in 17 seasons with the Rangers, Kings and Detroit Red Wings.

The many playoff failures convinced Rangers fans that this was a manifestation of the Curse of 1940, which is said to either have begun when the Rangers management burnt the mortgage to Madison Square Garden in the bowl of the Stanley Cup after the 1940 victory or by Red Dutton following the collapse of the New York Americans franchise. In the early 1980s, Islander fans began chanting "1940! 1940!" to taunt the Rangers. Fans in other cities soon picked up the chant.

Frustration was at its peak when the 1991–92 squad captured the Presidents' Trophy. They took a 2–1 series lead on the defending champion Pittsburgh Penguins and then faltered in three straight (most observers note a Ron Francis slapshot from the blue line that eluded Mike Richter as the series' turning point). The following year, injuries and a 1–11 finish landed the Rangers in the cellar of the Patrick Division after being in a playoff position for much of the season. Head coach Roger Neilson did not finish the season. The off-season hiring of controversial head coach Mike Keenan was criticized by many who pointed out Keenan's 0–3 record in the finals.

During this period, the Rangers were owned by Gulf+Western, which was renamed to Paramount Communications in 1989, and sold to Viacom in 1994. Viacom then sold the team to ITT Corporation and Cablevision, and in 1997, ITT sold its 50% ownership stake to Cablevision, which still owns the team today.

== Modern era (1993–present) ==
=== Stanley Cup: the ending of the curse (1993–1994) ===
The 1993–94 season was a successful one for Rangers fans, as Mike Keenan led the Rangers to their first Stanley Cup championship in 54 years. Two years prior, they acquired center Mark Messier, who was a part of the Edmonton Oilers' Stanley Cup-winning teams. Adam Graves, who also came from the Oilers, joined the Rangers as well. Other ex-Oilers on the Rangers included Esa Tikkanen and trade deadline acquisitions Oilers captain Craig MacTavish and Glenn Anderson from the Toronto Maple Leafs. Graves would set a team record with 52 goals, breaking the old record of 50 held by Vic Hadfield. This record would later be broken by Jaromír Jágr on April 8, 2006, against the Boston Bruins.

The Rangers clinched the Presidents' Trophy by finishing with the best record in the NHL at 52–24–8, setting a franchise record with 112 points. Their winning of the inaugural Atlantic Division title was only one of three times that the division title was not won by two of their biggest rivals, the New Jersey Devils and the Philadelphia Flyers.

The Rangers successfully made it past the first two rounds of the playoffs, sweeping the New York Islanders, who were seeded eighth in the first round, and then defeated the Washington Capitals, seeded seventh, in five. However, matters got interesting in the conference finals against the third-seeded New Jersey Devils. The Rangers lost the series opener at home in double overtime, but won the next two games before the Devils beat the New York offense and defeated them 3–1 and 4–1. The series headed back to the Meadowlands for the next game, but the day before the sixth game, Rangers captain Mark Messier stepped up and guaranteed a win. Keenan said of the guarantee:

Mark was sending a message to his teammates that he believed together we could win. He put on an amazing performance to make sure it happened.

In game 6, Messier rose to the occasion and scored three times in the final period to lead the Rangers to a 4–2 win and set up a seventh game back at Madison Square Garden. The Rangers won Game 7 2–1, when Stephane Matteau scored a goal in double overtime, leading the team to the finals for the first time since 1979.

Up against the Vancouver Canucks, the Cinderella team from the west, the Rangers again lost the series opener at home in overtime. Brian Leetch hit the crossbar at one end, and the Canucks going down to score the winner at the other on a shot from Greg Adams. The Rangers then bounced back and they won the next three games, allowing the Canucks just four goals. That set the stage for a game-five Stanley Cup celebration at home, the first time the team had ever been in a position to win a Cup at the Garden.

That night, the Canucks were leading 3–0 by the third minute of the third period. Even though the Rangers pulled even by the midway point, Vancouver took the lead 29 seconds later and cruised to a 6–3 win. New York's parade hopes were given another jolt two nights later when the Canucks put together a 4–1 win. Keenan said of playing Game 7:

Even though we were up 3–1 in the series and had to play a seventh game, the team was very confident and very poised. We had a lot of experience and a lot of leadership in our room... I told the players they should be proud of themselves... play hard and enjoy the moment. This is what we all dreamed about, playing a seventh game on home ice to win the Stanley Cup.

Entering Game 7, Keenan became the first person to be a head coach in game sevens of the Stanley Cup Final for two different teams; Keenan had coached the Flyers in 1987 when they lost to the Oilers. Mike Babcock would join him in this feat in 2009 while with the Detroit Red Wings, having been with the Mighty Ducks of Anaheim when they lost to the Devils in 2003 (the home team won all seven games of the series).

Game 7 was a classic. The Rangers took a 2–0 first period lead on goals by Leetch and Graves, but Vancouver captain Trevor Linden scored short-handed to cut the lead. Messier scored later on a power play to put the Rangers up 3–1. Linden scored a power play goal early in the third, but the Rangers managed to hang on 3–2 as the Garden erupted in cheers and tears. Mark Messier provided two of the most memorable images of that Stanley Cup Final that would become iconic images to the Rangers and their fans and in all of hockey: first, jumping up and down like a little kid with overwhelming emotion as ticker tape fell, then, showing incredible emotion as he accepted the Stanley Cup from NHL Commissioner Gary Bettman, as he became the first (and to this date, the only) player to captain two teams to the Stanley Cup, having been with the Oilers in 1990. This image was taken by George Kalinsky, photographer at Madison Square Garden, and was captured on film.

Leetch became the first American-born player to win the Conn Smythe Trophy, the first non-Canadian to win it, and Keenan avoided being the first coach to lose Game 7 Stanley Cup Final with two teams. However, this unfortunate fate would befall Babcock in 2009 when the Red Wings lost to the Pittsburgh Penguins, in-state rivals of the Flyers.

The Rangers winning this Stanley Cup was the highest-rated single CBC Sports program in history to that point (now that distinction belongs to the men's ice hockey gold medal game between Canada and the United States at the 2002 Winter Olympics, when Canada won its first Olympic ice hockey gold medal since the 1952 Winter Olympics). CBC commentator Bob Cole said Game 7 was one of his most memorable TV games.

=== Expensive acquisitions (1994–2004) ===
Despite having coached the Rangers to a regular season first-place finish and the Stanley Cup, head coach Mike Keenan left after a dispute with general manager Neil Smith. During the 1994–95 lockout-shortened season, the Rangers struggled to find their form and lost in the second round of the playoffs. They snuck in with the eighth seed and defeated the Quebec Nordiques in the first round, but were swept by Philadelphia in the second round. Succeeding Rangers head coach Colin Campbell orchestrated a deal that sent Sergei Zubov and center Petr Nedved to Pittsburgh in exchange for defenceman Ulf Samuelsson and left winger Luc Robitaille in the summer of 1995.

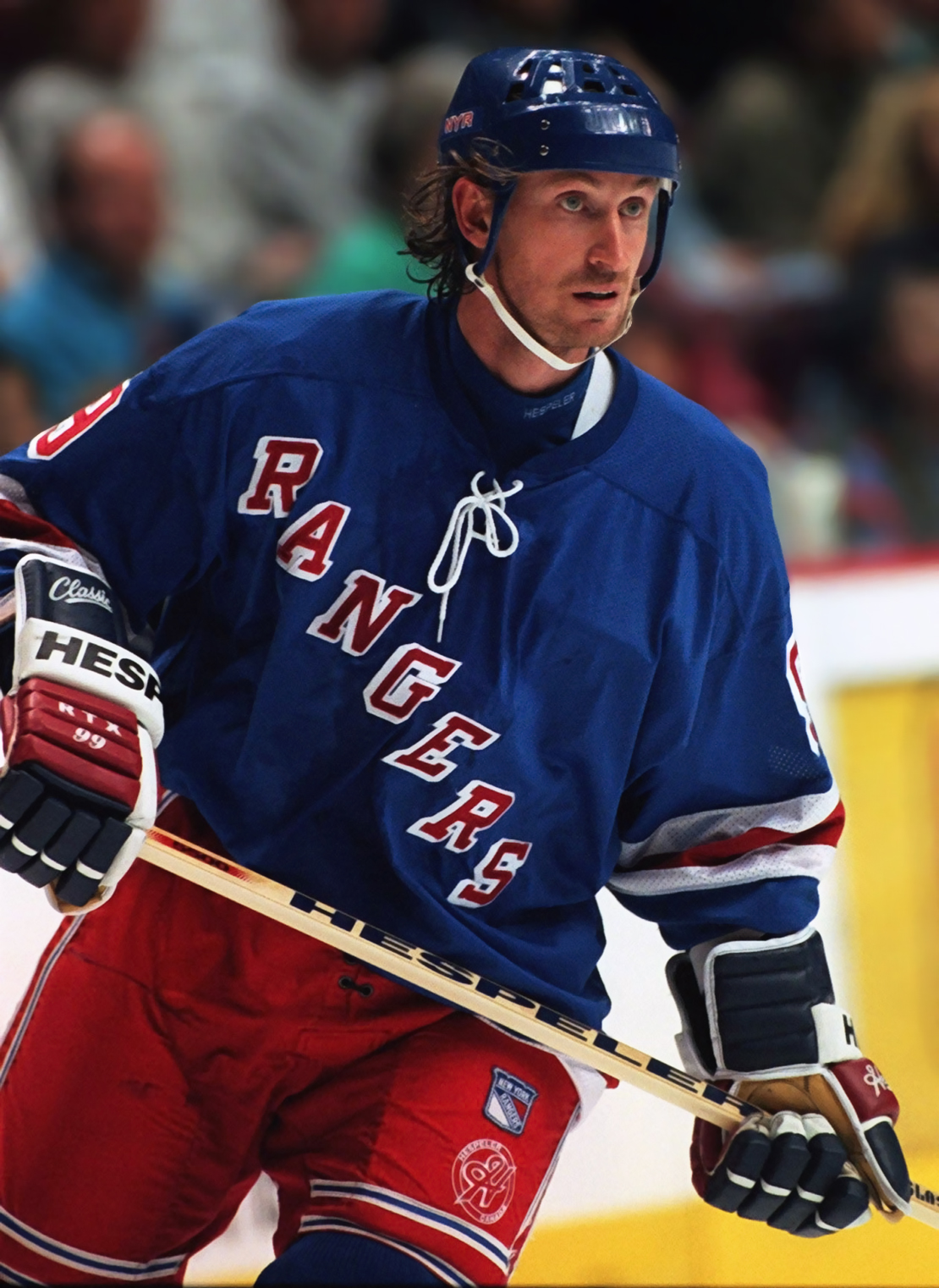
The Rangers acquired Wayne Gretzky as a free agent in the 1996 off-season.

The Rangers landed an aging Wayne Gretzky in 1996, but even with The Great One, they would fizzle out. Their 1994 stars were aging and many retired or dropped off in performance. Gretzky's greatest accomplishment was leading them to the 1997 Eastern Conference finals, where they lost 4–1 to the Eric Lindros-led Philadelphia Flyers. After GM Neil Smith ran Messier, a former Oiler teammate of Gretzky's, out of town in the summer of 1997 and failed in a bid to replace him with Colorado Avalanche superstar Joe Sakic, the Rangers began a streak of seven seasons without making the playoffs, despite routinely having the highest payroll in the NHL.

In 1999, James Dolan, son of Cablevision CEO Charles Dolan, assumed primary ownership and management responsibilities for the Rangers, the New York Knicks and Madison Square Garden. In March 2000, Dolan fired head coach John Muckler and general manager Neil Smith, replacing the latter with Glen Sather later that summer. By the end of the 2000–01 season, the Rangers had landed a lot of star power. Mark Messier had returned to New York, Theoren Fleury joined the Rangers after spending most of his career with the Calgary Flames, and Eric Lindros was traded to the Rangers from the Philadelphia Flyers. The Rangers also acquired Pavel Bure late in the 2001–02 season from the Florida Panthers. It was the rookie season of goaltender Dan Blackburn, who made the NHL All-Rookie Team even as the Rangers fell back to last place in the conference. Despite these high-priced acquisitions, the Rangers still finished out of the playoffs. Later years saw other stars such as Alexei Kovalev, Jaromir Jagr, Martin Rucinsky and Bobby Holik added, but in 2002–03 and 2003–04, the team again missed the playoffs. Blackburn started strongly in 2002–03, but burned out after 17 games. He then missed 2003–04 due to mononucleosis and a damaged nerve in his left shoulder. Blackburn could not rehabilitate the damaged nerve, and was forced to retire at age 22.

=== Post-lockout revival (2005–2014) ===
Towards the end of the 2003–04 season, GM Glen Sather finally gave in to a rebuilding process by trading away Brian Leetch, Alexei Kovalev and eight others for numerous prospects and draft picks. With the retirements of Pavel Bure and Mark Messier, as well as Eric Lindros signing with the Toronto Maple Leafs, the post-lockout Rangers, under new head coach Tom Renney, moved away from high-priced veterans towards a group of talented young players, such as Petr Prucha, Dominic Moore and Blair Betts. However, the focus of the team remained on veteran superstar Jaromir Jagr. The Rangers were expected to struggle during the 2005–06 season for their eighth consecutive season out of the postseason. For example, Sports Illustrated declared them the worst team in the NHL in their season preview, but behind stellar performances by Swedish rookie goaltender Henrik Lundqvist, Martin Straka, Michael Nylander, Prucha and Jagr, the Rangers finished the season a record of 44–26–12, their best record since 1993–94.

Jagr broke the Rangers' single-season points record with a first-period assist in a 5–1 win against the New York Islanders on March 29, 2006. The assist gave him 110 points on the season, breaking Jean Ratelle's record. Less than two weeks later, on April 8, Jagr scored his 53rd goal of the season against the Boston Bruins, breaking the club record previously held by Adam Graves. Two games prior, on April 4, the Rangers defeated the Philadelphia Flyers 3–2 in a shootout to clinch a playoff spot for the first time since 1996–97. On April 18, the Rangers lost to the Ottawa Senators 5–1, and, due to wins by Division rivals New Jersey and Philadelphia, the Rangers fell back to third place in the Atlantic and sixth in the Eastern Conference to end the season. In the Eastern Conference Quarter-finals, the Rangers drew a matchup with the Devils and were defeated in a four-game sweep. In the process, they were outscored 17–4, as New Jersey goaltender Martin Brodeur took two shutouts and a 1.00 GAA to Lundqvist's 4.25. In the first game of the series, Jagr suffered an undisclosed injury to his left shoulder, diminishing his usefulness as the series progressed. He missed Game 2 of the series and was back in the lineup for Game 3, though he was held to just one shot on goal. However, on his first shift of Game 4, Jagr re-injured his shoulder and was unable to return for the remainder of the game. Jagr fell two points short of winning his sixth Art Ross Trophy as scoring champion in 2005–06 (the San Jose Sharks' Joe Thornton claimed the award, his first, with 125 points), but Jagr did win his third Pearson Award as the players' choice for the most outstanding player.

With the Rangers doing so well in 2005–06, expectations were raised for the 2006–07 season, evidenced by Sports Illustrated then predicting the Rangers would finish first in their division. Realizing the team had trouble scoring goals in the 2005–06 campaign, the Rangers went out and signed Triple Gold Club winner, 12-time 30-goal scorer and long-time Detroit Red Wing Brendan Shanahan to a one-year contract. However, the organization remained committed to its rebuilding program despite the signing of the 37-year-old left winger.

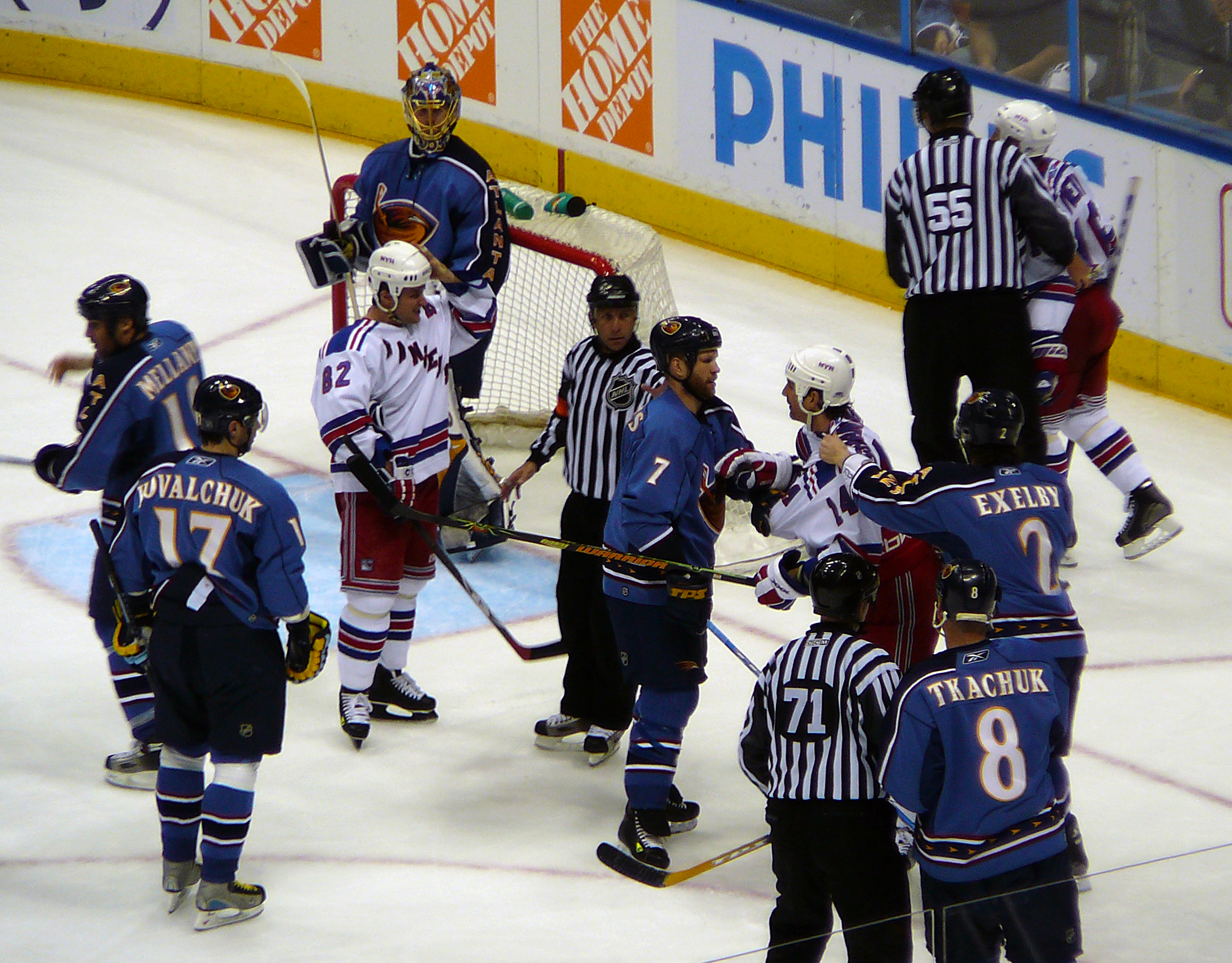
The Rangers faced the Atlanta Thrashers in the first round of the 2007 NHL playoffs.

On October 5, 2006, opening night of the 2006–07 season, Jagr was named the first team captain since Mark Messier's retirement. Though the Rangers started a bit slow in the first half of the 2006–07 season, the second half was dominated by the stellar goaltending of Henrik Lundqvist. On February 5, 2007 the Rangers acquired agitating forward Sean Avery in a trade with the Los Angeles Kings. The acquisition of Sean Avery brought new life and intensity to the team. Despite losing several players to injury in March, the Rangers went 10–2–3 in March to move into playoff position, and on April 5, clinched a playoff berth for the second consecutive season with a 3–1 win over the Montreal Canadiens. The Rangers finished the season ahead of the Tampa Bay Lightning and the New York Islanders, finishing in third place in the Atlantic Division and sixth place in the Eastern Conference for the second straight year. Facing the Atlanta Thrashers in the first round of the playoffs, the Rangers swept the series thanks to play from all around the ice. However, the Rangers lost the next round to the Buffalo Sabres by four games to two.

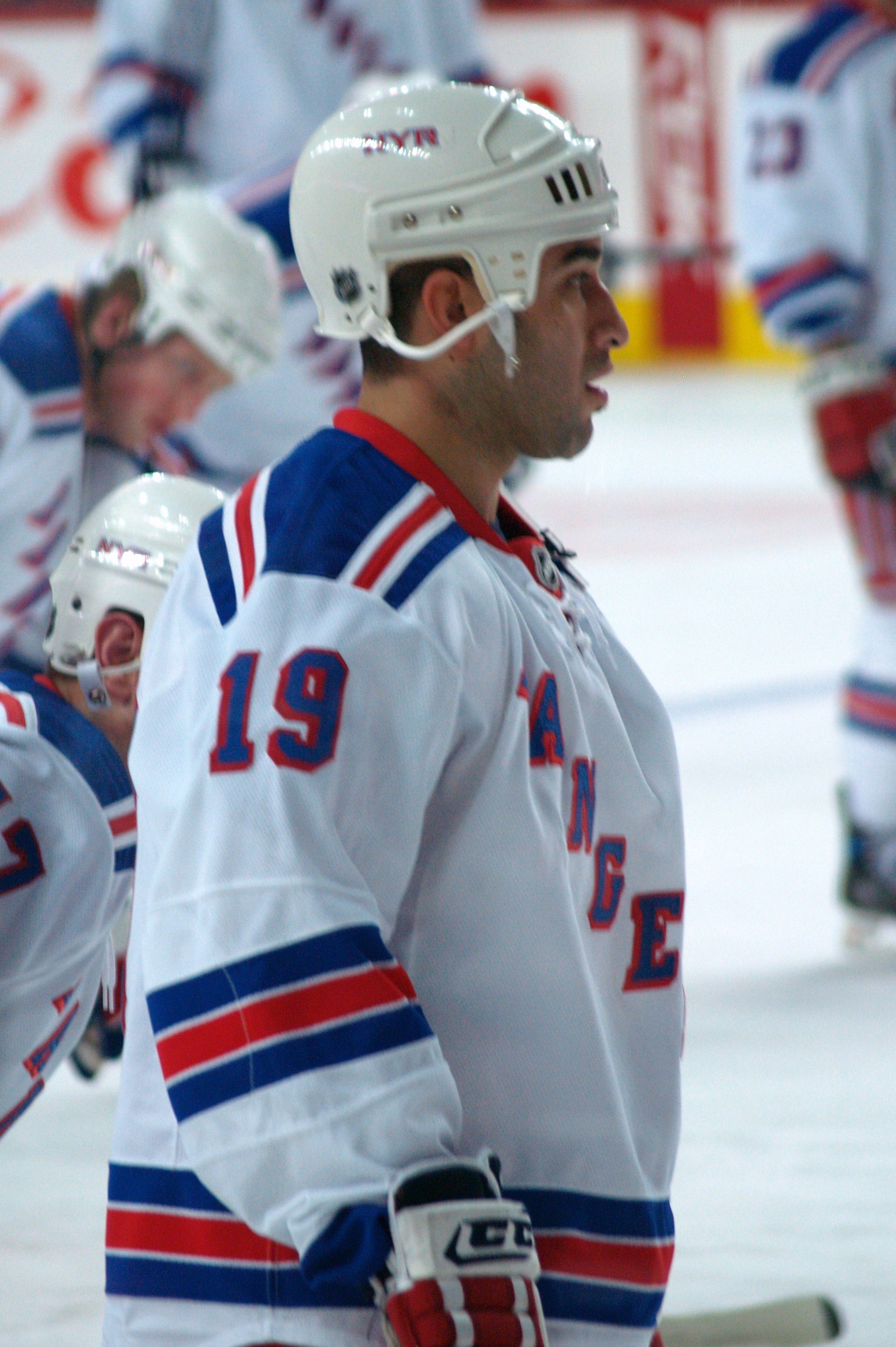
Scott Gomez with the Rangers during the 2007–08 season. Gomez signed with the Rangers in 2007.

At the 2007 NHL entry draft, the Rangers chose Alexei Cherepanov 17th overall. Cherepanov had been ranked by the NHL Central Scouting Bureau as the number one European skater and was considered to be a top-five pick leading up to the draft, but fell due to teams being unsure whether he would ever come to the NHL from Russia. Despite the departure of Michael Nylander in free agency, the 2007 free agency season started with a bang for the Rangers, with the signing of two high-profile centerman, Scott Gomez from New Jersey on a seven-year, $51.5 million contract, as well as Chris Drury from Buffalo on a five-year, $32.25 million deal. The moves, along with retaining most other key players, had been met favorably, as the Rangers appeared to be strong Stanley Cup contenders, making the playoffs for the third consecutive season and the second round for the second season in a row. However, despite these streaks, the Rangers failed to meet expectations, losing their second round series four games to one to the Pittsburgh Penguins. The following off-season saw the departures of captain Jaromir Jagr to the Kontinental Hockey League (KHL), and alternate captains Martin Straka and Brendan Shanahan, who returned to play in the Czech Republic and with the New Jersey Devils, respectively. Following these departures, Chris Drury was named captain on October 3, 2008.

The Rangers were one of four NHL teams to open their 2008–09 season in Europe, being featured in the Victoria Cup final, defeating the European Champions Cup winner Metallurg Magnitogorsk in Bern, Switzerland. The Rangers followed by playing two NHL regular season games against Tampa Bay in Prague on October 4 and 5, winning both games 2–1. The Rangers tied the 1983–84 Rangers for the best start in franchise history with a 5–0 record and set the franchise record for best start in a season through the first 13 games by going 10–2–1 for 21 points, with the 10 wins and 21 points each becoming franchise records. However, a successful start to the season was tempered with by the news of the sudden death of 2007 first-round pick Alexei Cherepanov, which occurred during a KHL game in Russia on October 13, 2008. A disappointing second half of the season followed. After the Rangers went 2-7-3 in their previous 12 games, on February 23, 2009 coach Tom Renney was fired, with 2004 Stanley Cup and Jack Adams Award winner John Tortorella named as his replacement. The Rangers made the 2009 playoffs, but lost their opening round series to the Washington Capitals four games to three after winning the first two games in Washington and having a 3–1 series lead after Game 4. On June 30, 2009, the Rangers traded Scott Gomez, Tom Pyatt and Michael Busto to the Montreal Canadiens in exchange for Chris Higgins, Ryan McDonagh, Pavel Valentenko and Doug Janik. With Gomez's contract and salary cap hit gone, the Rangers then signed superstar Marian Gaborik on July 1, the first day of free agency.

In the 2009–10 season, the Rangers failed to make the playoffs for the first time in five years. There was some criticism that the off-season acquisition of Gaborik, among other top-tier players, had not paid off. However, Gaborik scored 42 goals and 86 points in the season, an impressive return for the team. Despite a strong 8–2 start to the season, the Rangers appeared to play inconsistently with numerous losing streaks. By March 2010, the Rangers were in danger of falling out of the 2010 playoff race entirely, but they registered a respectable 7–1–2 record to finish the season. The final two games of the season were a home-and-home against the Philadelphia Flyers. The first was April 9, 2010, in New York, and the Rangers skated away with the victory, keeping their postseason hopes alive. The final game of the season would become the deciding game to determine who would make the playoffs. The Flyers peppered Rangers goaltender Henrik Lundqvist with 47 shots, but scored only once. The game went to a shootout, and the Flyers prevailed to move on to the playoffs despite the strong overall finish to the season by the Rangers.

For the 2010–11 season, the Rangers waived defenseman Wade Redden and brought in several players to achieve more balanced scoring. They also wore a third jersey for the first time in several years. On November 12, the Rangers unveiled the new Heritage Jersey for the first time at the rink at Rockefeller Center in a special ceremony featuring Rangers alumni and current players discussing the history of the storied franchise. The club wore the jersey for the first time on November 17 when they played the Boston Bruins at Madison Square Garden. The jersey was to be worn every time the Rangers play an Original Six team, or on a Sunday afternoon game at home. The Rangers' fate of making or missing the playoffs would come down to the final day of the regular season for the second-straight year. The team defeated the New Jersey Devils on the final day of the season to finish with 93 points on the year. However, in order to qualify for the 2011 playoffs, they needed the Carolina Hurricanes to lose their final game of the season, as Carolina owned the tiebreaker as both teams finished with the same number of points. Carolina lost its final game to Tampa Bay, 6–2, putting the Rangers in the playoffs after missing-out the previous season. The Rangers then faced Washington in the first round. After blowing a 3–0 third period lead in Game 4, with Washington ahead in the best-of-seven series two games to one, the Rangers lost the series in five games. It was the second time in three years that the Capitals eliminated the Rangers from the playoffs.

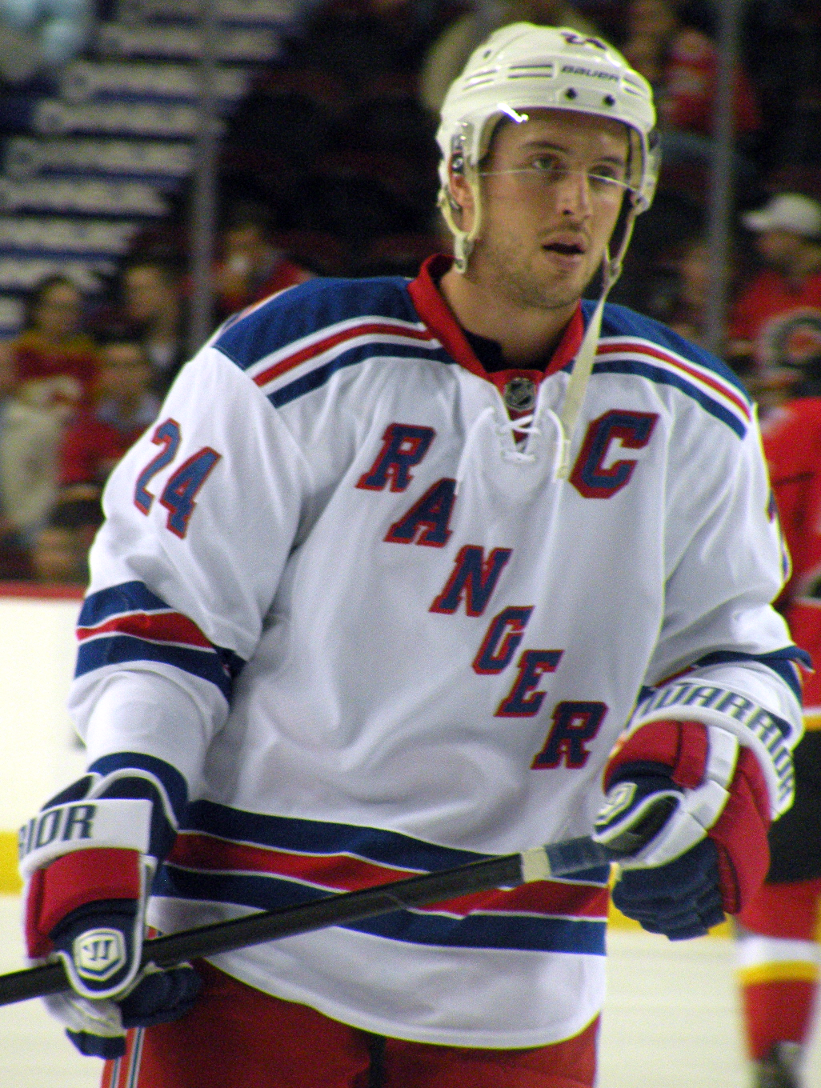
Ryan Callahan was named the captain of the New York Rangers in September 2011.

On May 13, 2011, Derek Boogaard, a player whom the Rangers signed the previous off-season for four years, was found dead in his Minnesota apartment. On June 29, 2011, the Rangers bought out captain Chris Drury's contract, and July 2, Brad Richards, an unrestricted free agent who had played with the Dallas Stars during the prior season, signed a nine-year, $60 million contract with the Rangers. On September 12, 2011, Ryan Callahan was named the 26th captain in New York Rangers history. He became the fifth-youngest captain in team history. Brad Richards and Marc Staal were named alternate captains on the same day.

In the 2011–12 season, the Rangers finished as the top seed in the Eastern Conference. Going 51–24–7, the team finished with 109 points for the regular season. Their leading scorer for the regular season was Marian Gaborik, who finished the season with 41 goals and 76 points while playing all 82 games. However, the Rangers missed-out on the Presidents' Trophy on the final day of the season to the Vancouver Canucks after a 4–1 loss to Washington. In the first round of the playoffs, the Rangers faced the eighth-seeded Ottawa Senators. After falling behind 3–2 in the series, the Rangers bounced back to win Game 6 in Ottawa, as well as the deciding Game 7 at home, propelling them to the Conference Semi-finals. In the semi-finals, the Rangers faced the Capitals. In game 3, Gaborik received a pass from Brad Richards to seal a victory 14:41 into the third overtime, giving the Rangers a 2–1 lead in the series. Washington then came back to tie the series 2–2 in Game 4. The Rangers avoided going down 3–2 in the series when Richards tied Game 5 at 2–2 with just 6.6 seconds left in the third period. The goal was scored on a power-play as a result of a high-sticking double-minor committed by Washington's Joel Ward on Rangers' forward Carl Hagelin. Then, in overtime, Rangers defenseman Marc Staal scored on the second penalty of the double-minor just 1:35 into overtime, giving the Rangers a 3–2 series lead. The Rangers went on to win the series 4–3, sending them to the Eastern Conference finals for the first time since 1997. In the conference finals, they faced the New Jersey Devils, a major divisional rival. After leading the series 2–1, the Rangers lost three games in a row, losing Game 6 in New Jersey with a goal by Devils forward Adam Henrique at 1:03 in overtime, giving the Devils a 4–2 series win and ending the Rangers' season.

On July 23, 2012, the Rangers traded Brandon Dubinsky, Artem Anisimov, Tim Erixon and a 2013 first-round draft pick to the Columbus Blue Jackets in exchange for All-Star Rick Nash, Steven Delisle and a 2013 conditional third-round pick. At the 2013 NHL trade deadline on April 3, the Rangers then traded Marian Gaborik, Steven Delisle and Blake Parlett to Columbus in exchange for Derick Brassard, Derek Dorsett, John Moore and a 2014 sixth-round draft pick. After the Rangers were eliminated from the second round of the playoffs by Boston, management fired head coach John Tortorella, and on June 21, 2013, GM Glen Sather formally introduced ex-Canucks head coach Alain Vigneault as Tortorella's replacement.

==== Return to the final (2013–2014) ====
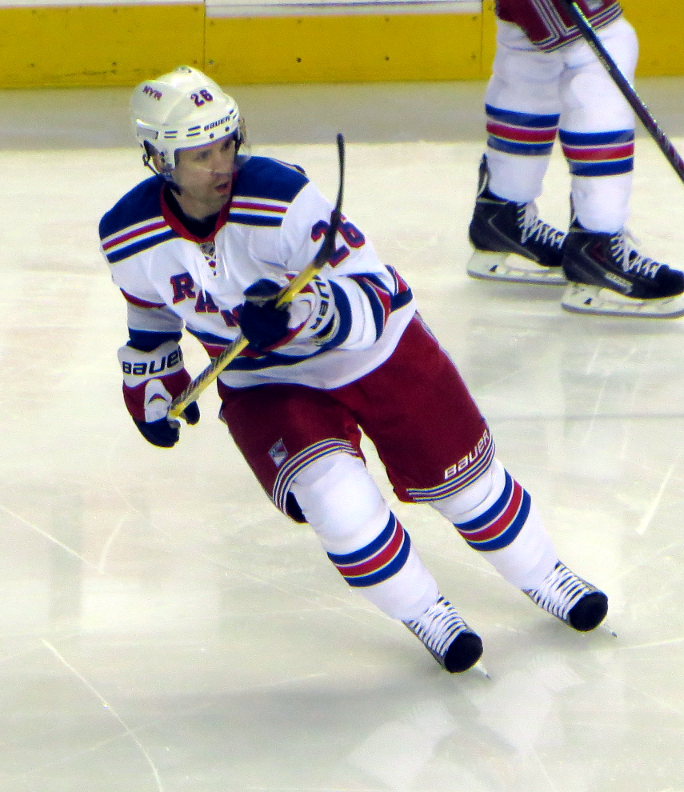
Martin St. Louis with the Rangers, several weeks after being acquired from the Tampa Bay Lightning, March 2014.

On March 5, 2014, the Rangers traded captain Ryan Callahan, a first-round draft pick in 2015, a conditional second-round pick in 2014 (which later became a first-round pick) and a conditional seventh-round pick in 2015 in exchange for Tampa Bay captain Martin St. Louis and a conditional second-round pick in 2015. The trade occurred in large part after the Rangers and Callahan were unable to reach a contract extension in the days leading up to the deadline. During the regular season, the Rangers won 25 road games, setting a then-franchise record. In the first round of the 2014 playoffs, New York defeated Philadelphia in seven games, and in the next round, the Rangers rallied from a 3–1 series deficit for the first time in their history to defeat Pittsburgh in seven games. They then defeated the Montreal Canadiens in six games to become the Eastern Conference champions, moving on to the Stanley Cup Final for the first time in 20 years. In the finals, they faced the Los Angeles Kings, the Western Conference champions and champions in 2012. The Rangers led the first two games by two goals and eventually fell in overtime, and were then shut-out at home 3–0 in Game 3. The Kings outshot the Rangers in Game 4, but the Rangers staved off elimination by winning the game 2–1 to force a Game 5 in Los Angeles. They had another lead in Game 5, but after the game was tied and subsequently sent to overtime, Kings defenseman Alec Martinez scored with 5:17 left in the second overtime period to win the game for Los Angeles, 3–2, as well as the Stanley Cup.

On June 20, 2014, a week after their season ended, the Rangers bought-out the remaining six years of Brad Richards' contract in order to free up salary cap space. This move left Marc Staal and Dan Girardi as the team's remaining alternate captains.

=== 2014–present ===
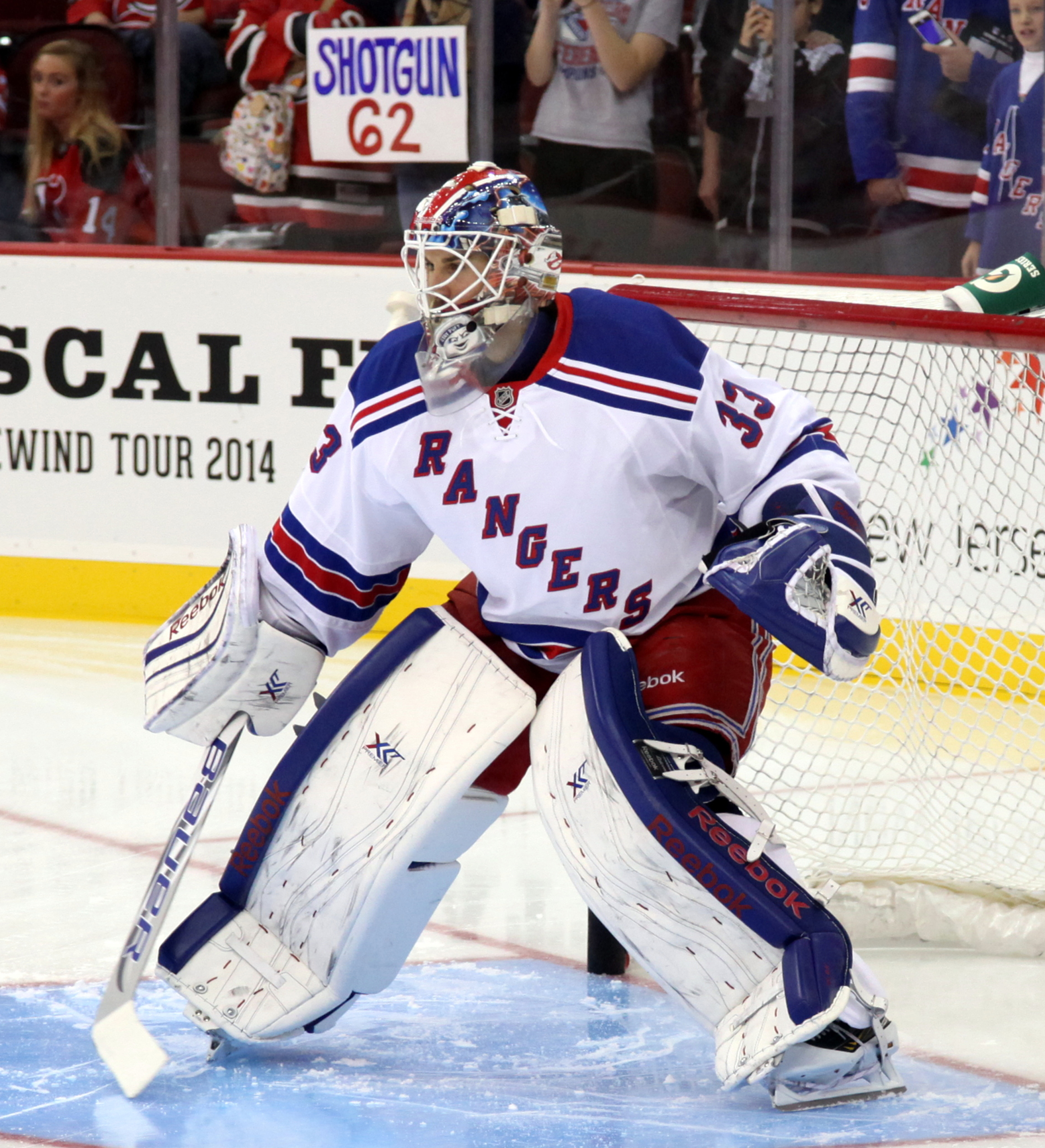
Cam Talbot with the Rangers during the 2014–15 NHL season. The Rangers signed Talbot to a contract extension during that season.

On October 6, 2014, defenseman Ryan McDonagh was named the Rangers' 27th captain in team history, with Derek Stepan, Dan Girardi, Marc Staal and Martin St. Louis serving as alternates. In the 2014–15 season, the Rangers won the Presidents' Trophy for the third time in franchise history and their seventh division title by finishing with the best record in the NHL at 53–22–7. The 53 wins and 113 points both set franchise records. The division title was the Rangers' first in the Metropolitan Division, which was created during the NHL's realignment in the 2013 off-season. The team won 28 road games in the regular season, breaking the franchise record set the previous season. Over the course of the season, the Rangers agreed to terms on a contract extension with goaltender Cam Talbot, Marc Staal and Mats Zuccarello. In the playoffs, the Rangers dispatched the Pittsburgh Penguins in five games in the first round. The Rangers then came back from a 3–1 series deficit to win their second-round series against the Capitals in seven games, becoming the first team in NHL history to battle back from a 3–1 deficit in back-to-back seasons and sending the Rangers to the Eastern Conference final for the third time in four years. However, after winning the first game against the Tampa Bay Lightning, the Rangers lost Game 2 by four goals. The two teams split the first four games of the series, but the Rangers lost Game 5 2–0 at home, which gave the Lightning an opportunity to clinch the conference finals in Tampa Bay. However, this did not happen in Game 6, as Derick Brassard scored a hat-trick and assisted on two other goals in an emphatic 7–3 Rangers victory to force a Game 7 in New York. There, the Lightning shutout the Rangers 2–0, ending the Rangers' season and marking the first occasion the Rangers had ever lost a Game 7 at home in franchise history and the first time they lost an elimination game at home since they lost to Buffalo in 2007.

On June 27, 2015 the Rangers traded Carl Hagelin and a pair of draft picks to the Anaheim Ducks in exchange for Emerson Etem and a draft pick, Cam Talbot and a draft pick to the Edmonton Oilers for three draft picks, and prospect Ryan Haggerty to the Chicago Blackhawks in exchange for Antti Raanta, who was to become the backup goaltender to Lundqvist. Subsequently, on July 1, 2015, Glen Sather resigned as GM, with Jeff Gorton taking his place to become the 11th general manager in team history. On July 2, 2015, Martin St. Louis announced his retirement from professional hockey. The team then signed Emerson Etem and re-signed Oscar Lindberg, Jesper Fast, J. T. Miller and Derek Stepan.

The Rangers started off the 2015–16 season well. After 18 games, they had a 14–2–2 record and a nine-game winning streak, which was eventually halted by Tampa Bay. However, the organization soon went downhill in the winter, losing three-straight games against the Montreal Canadiens, Boston Bruins and Philadelphia Flyers. They eventually posted a 4–7–2 record in December for only ten points. In January, the Rangers started playing more efficiently, posting a fair 6–4–1 record, and improved in February by going on a 10–3–1 run without any back-to-back losses. On January 8, 2016, the Rangers traded Emerson Etem to the Vancouver Canucks in exchange for Nicklas Jensen and a sixth-round pick in the 2017 NHL entry draft. On February 28, the Rangers traded prospect Aleksi Saarela, a 2016 second-round draft pick and a 2017 second-round draft pick for Carolina Hurricanes' captain Eric Staal, who later left the team after the season. The Rangers finished the season third in the division with 101 points for back-to-back 100+ point seasons. Despite high hopes, the Rangers were eliminated by the Pittsburgh Penguins in the first round of the 2016 playoffs in five games. On May 2, the Rangers agreed to terms with Antti Raanta on a contract extension, and on May 13, signed Pavel Buchnevich to an entry-level contract.

On June 25, 2016, the Rangers acquired Nick Holden from the Colorado Avalanche in exchange for a 2017 fourth-round draft pick. Over the course of the summer, the Rangers re-signed J. T. Miller, Chris Kreider and Kevin Hayes, while Dominic Moore, among others, departed via free agency. On July 18, the Rangers traded their leading scorer Derick Brassard and a 2018 seventh-round draft pick to the Ottawa Senators in exchange for Mika Zibanejad and a 2018 second-round draft pick. The team also signed Michael Grabner to a two-year contract and the much-anticipated college sensation Jimmy Vesey to a two-year, entry-level contract. In the ensuing season, the Rangers earned 102 points and clinched the top wild card spot in the Eastern Conference. They would go on to defeat Montreal in six games in the Eastern Conference first round but fell to the Ottawa Senators in six in the next round.

Following the narrow playoff defeat, the Rangers traded Stepan and Raanta to the Arizona Coyotes in exchange for Tony DeAngelo and the seventh overall pick in the 2017 draft, which became Lias Andersson. The Rangers then used their regularly scheduled first-round choice at 21st overall to select Filip Chytil. The team also signed All-Star defenseman Kevin Shattenkirk to a four-year deal worth $26.6 million. New York's 2017–18 season started slowly with losses in seven of their first eight games (1–5–2), but the team entered the new calendar year with a 20–13–5 mark that reinserted them back into the postseason picture. However, after an overtime victory over Buffalo in the 2018 NHL Winter Classic, the Rangers dropped 11 of their next 15 games. Following a 6–1 defeat by the Boston Bruins on February 7, the Rangers released an open letter to their fanbase that announced their intentions to rebuild. Several beloved names from their postseason runs were shipped off, including Rick Nash, Ryan McDonagh, and J. T. Miller. The Rangers finished the season with a 34–39–9 record, missing the playoffs for the first time since 2010.

Following the season, Vigneault was fired and replaced by former Boston University head coach David Quinn. During the 2018 draft, they used their first-round picks to select Vitali Kravtsov, K'Andre Miller, and Nils Lundkvist. In the midst of another rebuilding season, the Rangers traded away more familiar faces like Mats Zuccarello and Kevin Hayes. They missed the playoffs for the second consecutive season with a 32–36–14 record but they did enjoy a breakout season from Zibanejad, who scored a career-best 30 goals. Shortly after the season's end, the Rangers brought in defenseman Jacob Trouba from Winnipeg as well as touted Carolina prospect Adam Fox.

Granted the sixth-best odds to win the top overall pick at the 2019 draft, the Rangers moved up to the second slot after getting lucky at the lottery. They used the choice to select Finnish wing Kaapo Kakko. Additionally, the Rangers made a major splash in free agency by signing former Columbus Blue Jacket Artemi Panarin to a seven-year deal. The Rangers got off to a slow start in Panarin's first year with the team, but an 11–4–0 mark in February put them in the postseason discussion. Zibanejad led the team with 41 goals, five alone coming in an overtime win over Washington on March 5, 2020, while Panarin earned 95 points. Those marks were good enough for fifth and third respectively in the NHL. The Rangers sat within striking distance of a playoff spot with a 37–28–5 record on March 12, when the NHL shut down its season due to the COVID-19 pandemic. They were nonetheless invited to a 24-team tournament in a bubbled setting in Toronto when the league resumed the season later that summer. The Rangers were seeded 11th but failed to earn a single win in the Toronto bubble, as they were promptly swept by the sixth-seeded Carolina Hurricanes in the Eastern Conference's qualifying round.

Following their elimination, the Rangers hit the jackpot at the 2020 draft lottery, which yielded them the top overall pick over the other seven teams that were vanquished in the qualifying round. The Rangers used that selection to take top prospect Alexis Lafreniere. During the off-season, the Rangers traded Marc Staal to the Detroit Red Wings and bought out the final year of Henrik Lundqvist's contract, leaving Kreider as the lone leftover from their 2014 Eastern Conference-winning squad. Over an abbreviated 56-game season, the Rangers posted a respectable 27–23–6 record despite several in-season calamities. DeAngelo was waived in January 2021 after several behavioral incidents led to his dismissal. Panarin took a leave of absence in February to deal with a personal matter in his native Russia, while Quinn and his staff were briefly sidelined due to COVID-19 issues, forcing AHL Hartford head coach Kris Knoblauch to temporarily take over. The Rangers were eliminated from playoff contention on May 3, after which general manager Jeff Gorton and team president John Davidson were relieved of their duties. Both roles were assumed by associate general manager and former Rangers captain Chris Drury. Quinn and his staff were likewise ousted at the end of the season.

In June 2021, the Rangers hired Gerard Gallant to be their new head coach. Over the offseason, the Rangers added several players known for their physicality, including Barclay Goodrow, Ryan Reaves, and Sammy Blais (who was obtained in a trade with the St. Louis Blues in exchange for Buchnevich). Anchored by the play of new franchise goaltender Igor Shesterkin and a breakthrough season from Kreider, the Rangers finished second in the Metropolitan Division with a 52-24-6 record. Kreider, who became the fourth Ranger to score at least 50 goals, earned the team's Steven McDonald Extra Effort Award, as well as the Rod Gilbert "Mr. Ranger" Award, named after the Rangers great who died in August 2021. At the trade deadline, the Rangers added Frank Vatrano, Justin Braun, Tyler Motte, and Andrew Copp. In the postseason, the Rangers lost three of their first four games against the third-seeded Pittsburgh Penguins but came to win the first round series in seven games, capping off the comeback with an overtime goal from Panarin. The Rangers then advanced to take on the Hurricanes in the second round, winning in seven games. They were then eliminated by the Tampa Bay Lightning in six games in the Conference Finals.

By the end of the next season, the Rangers had acquired Vladimir Tarasenko and Niko Mikkola from the St. Louis Blues and Patrick Kane from the Blackhawks. The team finished third in their division with a record of 47–22–13, and made the playoffs for the second year in a row. However, they lost to their river rivals, the New Jersey Devils in seven games despite having a 2–0 series lead, and as a result Gallant was fired as head coach and replaced with Peter Laviolette following the season.

The Rangers went on to set several milestones during the 2023–24 season – the team earned the 3,000th regular season victory in its history, becoming the fifth team to reach the milestone. The team also took home a thrilling victory in the 2024 Stadium Series, defeating the rival Islanders 6–5 at MetLife Stadium. The Rangers posted a franchise-record 55 wins and 114 points, enough to win the Presidents' Trophy for the fourth time. In the postseason, the Rangers won each of their first seven games (the first team to do so since 2008), including a sweep of Washington in round one before they defeated Carolina in six. They then took a 2–1 series lead against the Florida Panthers in the Eastern Conference finals, but dropped the last three games to endure their third consecutive semifinal appearance. Despite this run, the following season was disastrous, as the Rangers became the fourth team in NHL history to miss the playoffs after winning the Presidents' Trophy the prior season. Veteran players, such as Chris Kreider and Mika Zibanejad, received significant criticism throughout the season, while captain Jacob Trouba, Kaapo Kakko, and Filip Chytil were traded away, and Laviolette was fired at the end of the season.

== See also ==
- List of NHL rivalries
