= Vladimir Malenkikh =

Russian ice hockey player

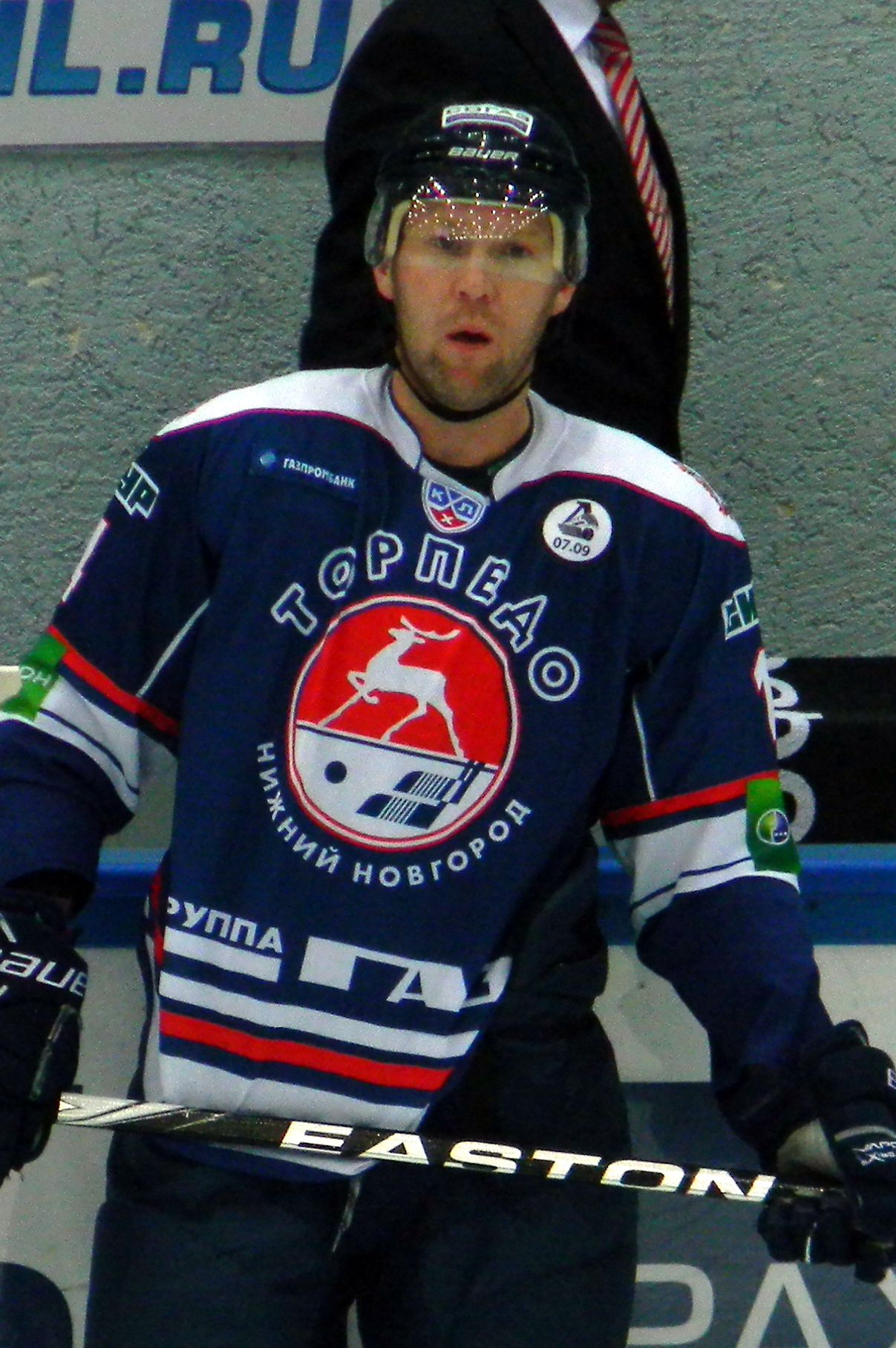
- Born: 1 October 1980 (age 45) Togliatti, Soviet Union
- Height: 6 ft 1 in (185 cm)
- Weight: 198 lb (90 kg; 14 st 2 lb)
- Position: Defence
- Shot: Left
- Played for: Lada Togliatti; CSK VVS Samara; Metallurg Magnitogorsk; Torpedo Nizhny Novgorod
- NHL draft: 157th overall, 1999; Pittsburgh Penguins
- Playing career: 1998–2018

Vladimir Malenkikh (born October 1, 1980) is a Russian former professional ice hockey defenceman who played most notably in the Kontinental Hockey League (KHL). He was drafted 157th overall by the Pittsburgh Penguins in the fifth round of the 1999 NHL entry draft.

== Playing career ==
Malenkikh started his career with Lada Togliatti in 1999 and remained with the team until 2005. He spent the next six seasons with Metallurg Magnitogorsk, staying with the team until the conclusion of the 2010-11 KHL season.

Malenkikh signed with Torpedo Nizhny Novgorod on May 12, 2011, joining the team with long-time friend Alexander Yevseyenkov.

On June 6, 2018, Malenkikh ended his 20 year professional career, announcing his retirement however continuing his association with Lada Togliatti, remaining as an assistant coach for their MHL junior club.

== Awards and accomplishments ==
- 2007: Russian Superleague champion
