= Rinat Ibragimov (ice hockey) =

Russian ice hockey player

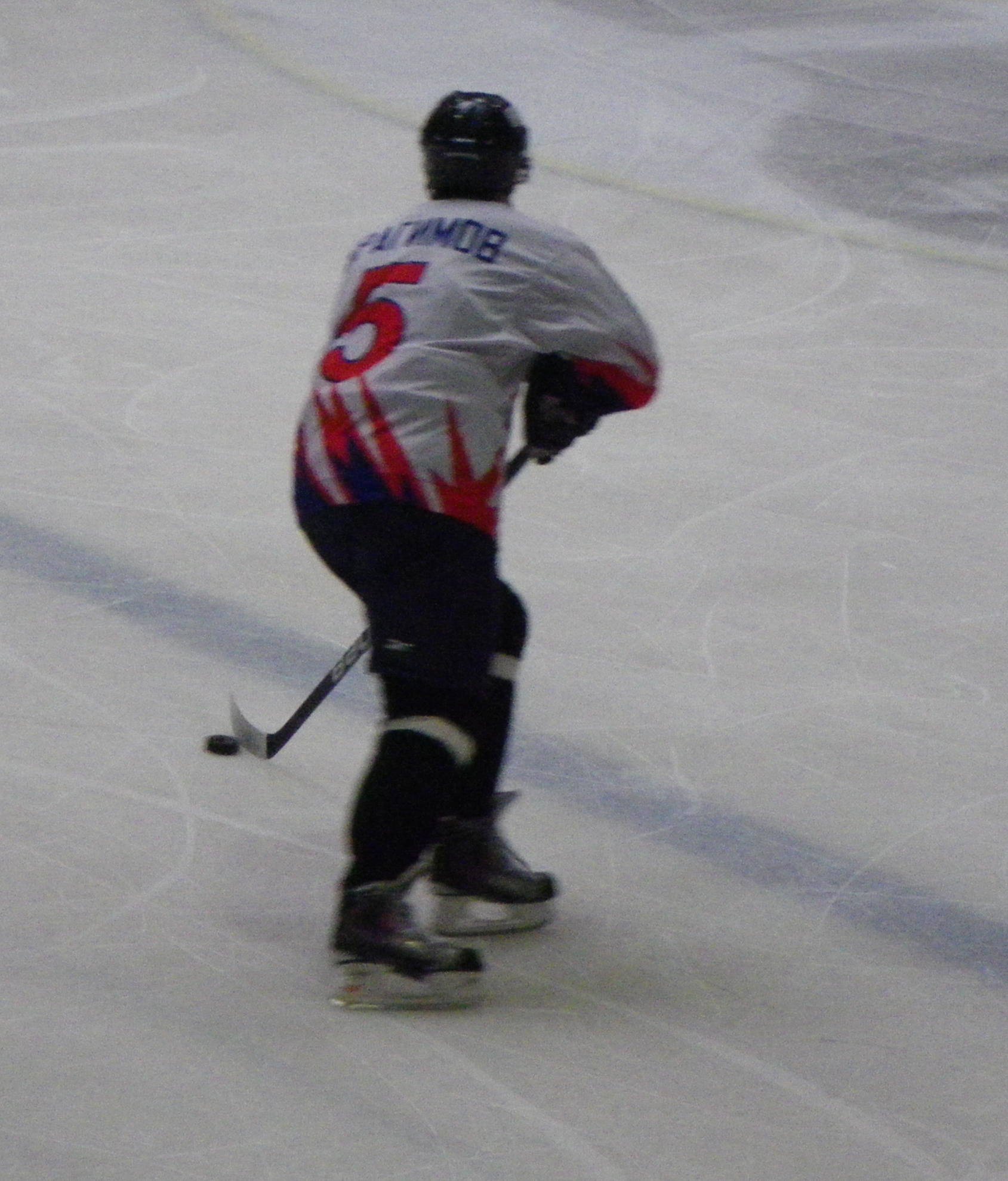
- Born: 7 March 1986 (age 39) Ust-Kamenogorsk, Kazakh SSR, Soviet Union
- Height: 6 ft 0 in (183 cm)
- Weight: 205 lb (93 kg; 14 st 9 lb)
- Position: Defence
- Shot: Left
- Played for: Metallurg Magnitogorsk; Lada Togliatti; Yugra Khanty-Mansiysk; HC Sibir Novosibirsk; Amur Khabarovsk; HC Sochi; HK SKP Poprad; Kunlun Red Star
- Playing career: 2005–2018

Rinat Rashidovich Ibragimov (Russian: Ринат Рашидович Ибрагимов; born 7 March 1986) is a Russian former professional ice hockey defenceman who played for HC Kunlun Red Star in the Kontinental Hockey League (KHL).

== Playing career ==
In the 2015–16 season, Ibragimov joined Khabarovsk in a mid-season trade after contributing with 6 points in 28 games with the HC Sibir Novosibirsk on 30 November 2015. He produce a further 5 points in 22 games with Khabarovsk before opting to leave as a free agent in the off-season to join HC Sochi on a one-year deal on 1 May 2016.

== International ==
Year	Team	Event	Result	GP	G	A	Pts	PIM
2004	Russia	WJC18	1st place, gold medalist(s)	6	0	0	0	0
Junior totals				6	0	0	0	0
