= 2005 IIHF European Champions Cup =

Tournament details
- Host country: Russia
- Venue: 1 (in 1 host city)
- Dates: January 13 - January 16
- Teams: 6

Final positions
- Champions: (Russia) Avangard Omsk (1st title)

Tournament statistics
- Games played: 7
- Goals scored: 45 (6.43 per game)
- Attendance: 28,100 (4,014 per game)
- Scoring leader: (Russia) Maxim Sushinsky (7 points)

Awards
- MVP: (Russia) Maxim Sushinsky

The 2005 IIHF European Champions Cup was the first edition of IIHF European Champions Cup. It was held in Saint Petersburg at the Ice Palace arena, from January 13 to January 16. The champions of 2004 of the six strongest hockey nations of Europe participate: Avangard Omsk (RUS), HV71 (SWE), HC Dukla Trenčín (SVK), Kärpät (FIN), HC Hame Zlín (CZE) and Frankfurt Lions (GER).

== Group A ==
=== Results ===
All times local (CET/UTC +1)

January 13, 2005; 19:30	HC Hame Zlín (Czech Republic)	4 – 3 (2 - 2, 0 - 1, 2 - 0)	(Germany) Frankfurt Lions	Ice Palace; Attendance: 2,100

M. Okál 1:05; M. Okál 18:08; M. Erat 53:58; J. Kristek 57:22 / Goals / P. Ratchuk 4:07; P. Lebeau 16:57; C. Bassen 36:25

January 14, 2005; 16:00	Kärpät (Finland)	4 – 1 (1 - 0, 2 - 1, 1 - 0)	(Czech Republic) HC Hame Zlín	Ice Palace; Attendance: 1,800

J. Jokinen 2:26; J.-P. Haataja 35:40; P. Tenkrát 39:55; J. Boumedienne 48:53 / Goals / J. Balaštík 24:32

January 15, 2005; 19:30	Kärpät (Finland)	6 – 3 (3 - 1, 2 - 0, 1 - 2)	(Germany) Frankfurt Lions	Ice Palace; Attendance: 2,200

J.-P. Haataja 5:18; J. Viuhkola 7:16; J. Viuhkola 12:17; L. Kukkonen 26:33; E. Somervuori 37:11; J. Jokinen 59:21 / Goals / P. Lebeau 10:23; J. Young 43:30; J. Murphy 48:50

=== Standings ===
Pos	Team	Pld	W	OTW	OTL	L	GF	GA	GD	Pts
1	(Finland) Kärpät	2	2	0	0	0	10	4	+6	6
2	(Czech Republic) HC Hame Zlín	2	1	0	0	1	5	7	−2	3
3	(Germany) Frankfurt Lions	2	0	0	0	2	6	10	−4	0

== Group B ==
=== Results ===
All times local (CET/UTC +1)

January 13, 2005; 16:00	Avangard Omsk (Russia)	6 – 1 (3 - 1, 1 - 0, 2 - 0)	(Slovakia) HC Dukla Trenčín	Ice Palace; Attendance: 3,200

A. Kovalenko 1:45; M. Sushinsky 9:44; O. Tverdovsky 16:46; J. Bednář 29:44; J. Jágr 42:38; A. Kalyuzhny 45:08 / Goals / J. Zlocha 11:21

January 14, 2005; 19:30	HV71 (Sweden)	4 – 1 (3 - 0, 0 - 0, 1 - 1)	(Slovakia) HC Dukla Trenčín	Ice Palace; Attendance: 1,300

P. Ekelund 1:12; P.-Å. Skrøder 1:58; S. Skoog 6:53; A. Eriksson 55:38 / Goals / P. Fabuš 57:32

January 15, 2005; 16:00	Avangard Omsk (Russia)	9 – 0 (4 - 0, 2 - 0, 3 - 0)	(Sweden) HV71	Ice Palace; Attendance: 7,500

A. Kovalenko 8:08; A. Guskov 11:08; M. Sushinsky 12:28; A. Perezhogin 18:02; M. Sushinsky 29:41; A. Kurianov 31:27; A. Perezhogin 53:25; M. Sushinsky 55:43; O. Tverdovsky 56:52 / Goals

=== Standings ===
Pos	Team	Pld	W	OTW	OTL	L	GF	GA	GD	Pts
1	(Russia) Avangard Omsk	2	2	0	0	0	15	1	+14	6
2	(Sweden) HV71	2	1	0	0	1	4	10	−6	3
3	(Slovakia) HC Dukla Trenčín	2	0	0	0	2	2	10	−8	0

== Gold medal game ==
January 16, 2005; 16:00	Avangard Omsk (Russia)	2 – 1 (OT) (0 - 1, 0 - 0, 1 - 0, 1 - 0 (OT))	(Finland) Kärpät	Ice Palace; Attendance: 10,000

A. Kalyuzhny 51:00; J. Jágr 74:38 / Goals / I. Mikkola 12:16

2005 IIHF European Champions Cup Winners
(Russia)
Avangard Omsk
First title
