= Jaromír Jágr =

Czech ice hockey player (born 1972)

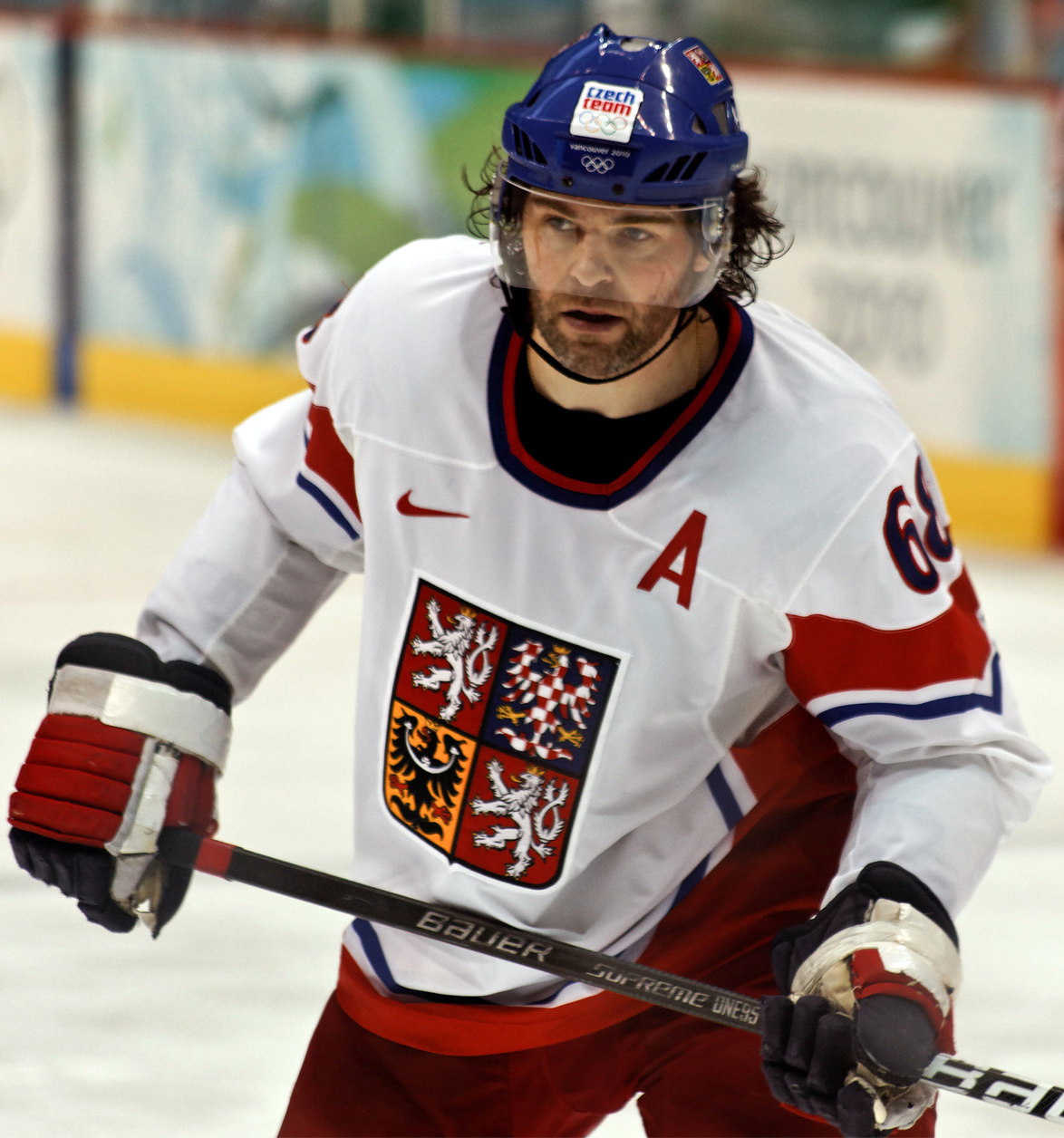
- Jágr with the Czech Republic in 2010
- Born: 15 February 1972 (age 54) Kladno, Czechoslovakia
- Height: 6 ft 3 in (191 cm)
- Weight: 230 lb (104 kg; 16 st 6 lb)
- Position: Right wing
- Shoots: Left
- ELH team Former teams: Rytíři Kladno; Pittsburgh Penguins; HC Bolzano; Washington Capitals; New York Rangers; Avangard Omsk; Philadelphia Flyers; Dallas Stars; Boston Bruins; New Jersey Devils; Florida Panthers; Calgary Flames
- National team: Czechoslovakia and Czech Republic
- NHL draft: 5th overall, 1990; Pittsburgh Penguins
- Playing career: 1988–present

Jaromír Jágr (Czech pronunciation: [ˈjaromiːr ˈjaːɡr̩]; born 15 February 1972) is a Czech professional ice hockey player who is a right winger and owner of Rytíři Kladno of the Czech Extraliga (ELH). He previously played in the National Hockey League (NHL) for the Pittsburgh Penguins, Washington Capitals, New York Rangers, Philadelphia Flyers, Dallas Stars, Boston Bruins, New Jersey Devils, Florida Panthers, and Calgary Flames, serving as captain of the Penguins from 1998 to 2001 and the Rangers between 2006 and 2008.

After leaving the Rangers in 2008, he played three seasons in the Kontinental Hockey League (KHL) with Avangard Omsk. He returned to the NHL in 2011 with the Flyers and remained in the league for seven more years before being assigned by the Flames in 2018 to HC Kladno. Having played in 37 professional seasons (as of 2024) and over 2,000 professional games, Jágr has had the longest playing career in professional ice hockey history. He is the most productive European player who has ever played in the NHL and is widely regarded as one of the greatest players ever.

Jágr has the second-most points in NHL history, after Wayne Gretzky. In 1990, at age 18, he was the youngest player in the NHL. Until his transfer, at age 45, he was the oldest player in the NHL and is the oldest player to record a hat-trick. In 2017, Jágr was named one of the 100 Greatest NHL Players in history.

Jágr was the fifth overall selection in the 1990 NHL entry draft. He won consecutive Stanley Cups in the 1991 and 1992 seasons with the Penguins. Individually, he has won the Art Ross Trophy as the NHL scoring champion five times (four times in a row), the Lester B. Pearson Award for the NHL's outstanding player as voted by the NHL Players' Association (NHLPA) three times, and the Hart Memorial Trophy as the league's most valuable player once, in 1999, while finishing second four times.

Jágr is a member of the Triple Gold Club, individuals who have played for teams that have won the Stanley Cup (1991, 1992), the Ice Hockey World Championships (2005, 2010) and the Olympic gold medal in ice hockey (1998). Jágr is one of only two Czech players (the other being Jiří Šlégr) in the club, achieving this feat in 2005. Jágr was the Czech Republic's flag bearer at the 2010 Winter Olympics. Jágr is also one of only three players from 1981 to 2001 to win the Art Ross Trophy as the leading point-scorer during the regular season; the others are Wayne Gretzky and Mario Lemieux. Jágr has won the award more times than any other non-Canadian player. He has been a member of the Czech Ice Hockey Hall of Fame since 2008 and the IIHF Hall of Fame since 2024.

== Playing career ==
=== Early career ===
Jágr began skating at age three, and he immediately showed exceptional abilities. At age 15, he played at the highest level of competition in Czechoslovakia for Poldi SONP Kladno. When he was 17, he became the youngest member of the Czechoslovakia national team.

As a youth in his native country, he kept a photograph of American president Ronald Reagan in his school grade book as a protest against the policies of the Soviet Union.

=== Pittsburgh Penguins (1990–2001) ===
Jágr was the first Czechoslovak player to be drafted by the NHL without having to defect to the West; his selection in the NHL draft came as the Iron Curtain fell. Because of this, after Jágr was selected by the Pittsburgh Penguins with the fifth overall pick in the 1990 NHL entry draft, he was able to relocate to North America from Czechoslovakia immediately. When he attended the draft in Vancouver, he was the first Czechoslovak player present at the NHL draft with his government's blessings.

Jágr was a supporting player with the powerhouse Penguins that won back-to-back Stanley Cups in 1991 and 1992. He was one of the youngest players in NHL history, at age 20, to score a goal in the Stanley Cup Final.

Before he had a clear grasp of the English language, Jágr could be heard reading the daily weather forecast on Pittsburgh radio station WDVE in his broken, thickly-accented English. He and teammate (and fellow countryman) Jiří Hrdina were promoted as the "Czechmates", a play on the term "checkmate" from chess. He also played Scrabble to increase his English vocabulary. Some Penguins fans realized that the letters in his first name could be scrambled to form the anagram "Mario Jr.", a reference to teammate Mario Lemieux.

In the 1994–95 season, Jágr won his first Art Ross Trophy after finishing the regular season with the most points in the NHL; he tied Eric Lindros with 70 points but won based on his 32 goals to Lindros' 29. Jágr set a record for most points, 149, by a European-born player the following year. His 62 goals and 87 assists from that season still stand as career highs. His 1995–96 totals for assists and points stand as the records for right-wingers in those categories. After the 1997–98 season, Penguins captain Ron Francis signed with the Carolina Hurricanes, leaving Jágr the Penguins' captaincy. From 1997–98 to 2000–01, Jágr would win four straight NHL scoring titles. In 1999, he would win the Hart Memorial Trophy as the NHL's most valuable player, as well as the Lester B. Pearson Award. In 1998, he led the Czech Republic to a gold medal at the 1998 Winter Olympics.

On 30 December 1999, against the New York Islanders, Jágr scored three goals and four assists for a career-high seven-point night. He would later match this feat on 11 January 2003 by once again scoring three goals and four assists in a game against the Florida Panthers as a member of the Washington Capitals.

In 2000–01, Jágr was struggling to find his scoring touch and faced criticisms about his relationship with Penguins head coach Ivan Hlinka. With the return of Mario Lemieux from retirement, the Penguins had two superstars, but friction developed between the two; Jágr continued to hold the captaincy for the rest of the season even after Lemieux returned, but many fans regarded Lemieux as the talisman of the team. Additionally, the struggling, medium-market Penguins could, with Lemieux back, no longer hope to afford Jágr's high salary. Thus, on 11 July 2001, the organization traded him, along with František Kučera, to the Washington Capitals in exchange for Kris Beech, Michal Sivek and Ross Lupaschuk.

In 806 games with Pittsburgh, Jágr became only the second player (after Lemieux) to score 1,000 points as a Penguin. Jágr sits second behind Lemieux in career goals in franchise history and third in games played, assists, and points, having since been surpassed by Sidney Crosby. His no. 68 jersey was eventually retired in a pregame ceremony on 18 February 2024, with Jágr becoming just the third Penguins player to receive the honour.

=== Washington Capitals (2001–2004) ===
Later in 2001, the Capitals signed Jágr to the then-largest contract in NHL history at $77 million over seven years, an average annual value of $11 million, with an option for an eighth year. However, Jágr did not live up to expectations in Washington, as the Capitals failed to defend their division title and missed the 2002 Stanley Cup playoffs. During his tenure with the Capitals, for the first time in his career Jágr failed to finish among the NHL's top scorers, help his team qualify for the Stanley Cup playoffs, or make the NHL All-Star team. During the summer of 2002, the Capitals reunited Jágr with former teammate Robert Lang. In 2002–03, Washington finished sixth overall in the Eastern Conference. Still, it lost to the upstart Tampa Bay Lightning in the first round of the 2003 playoffs despite winning the series' first two games.

The lack of organizational success prompted the Capitals to unload much of their high-priced talent to save money—not just a cost-cutting spree, but also an acknowledgment that their attempt to build a contender with high-priced veteran talent had failed. Disgruntled, Washington ownership spent much of 2003 trying to trade Jágr. Still, a year before a new Collective Bargaining Agreement (CBA) was to be signed, few teams were willing to risk $11 million on Jágr.

On 23 January 2004, Jágr was eventually traded to the New York Rangers in exchange for Anson Carter and an agreement that Washington would pay approximately $4 million per year of Jágr's salary. Jágr also agreed to defer (with interest) $1 million per year for the remainder of his contract to allow the trade to go through.

=== New York Rangers (2004–2008) ===
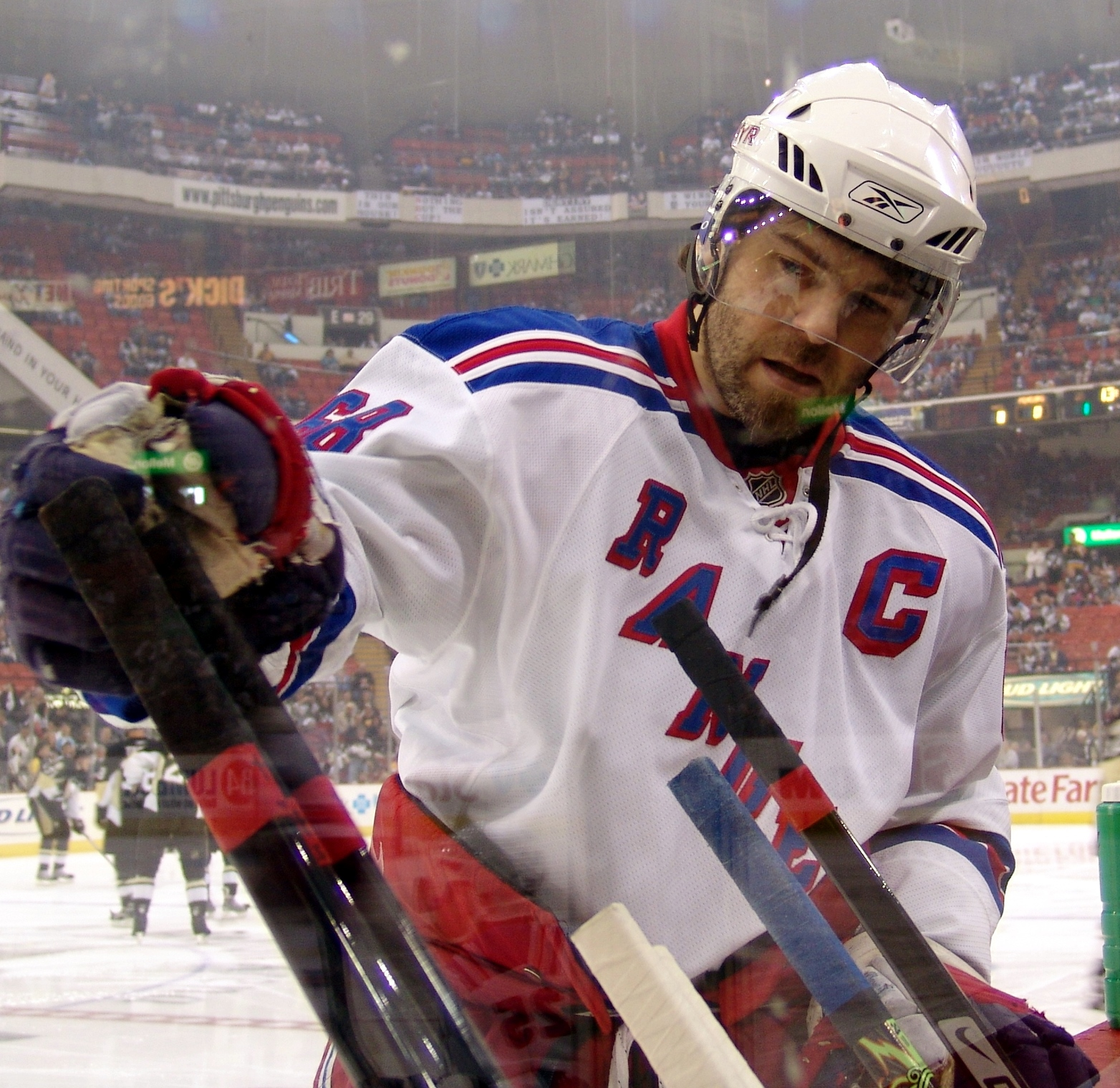
Jágr with the Rangers in the 2008 playoffs.

Due to the new CBA signed before the start of the 2005–06 season, Jágr's salary was reduced to $7.8 million, the maximum allowed under the terms of the new salary cap.

During the NHL labor dispute in 2004–05, he played for HC Kladno in the Czech Republic and, afterward, for Avangard Omsk in the Russian Superleague (RSL).

Jágr led the Czech Republic to gold at the 2005 World Hockey Championships in Austria and was elected a tournament all-star. He also became a member of hockey's prestigious Triple Gold Club, players who have won a Stanley Cup, a World Hockey Championship and an Olympic gold medal.

Before the 2005–06 season, the Rangers had missed the playoffs for seven consecutive seasons. Following the fire sale of the high-priced, underachieving veterans that made up the team's roster (as well as the retirement of long-time captain Mark Messier), many experts picked the Rangers to be the worst team in the NHL. Jágr disagreed and promised the team would surprise many people and make the Stanley Cup playoffs. He started strong during the beginning of the 2005 season and the return from the lockout of the NHL. He became only the fourth player in NHL history to score ten or more goals in less than ten games at the start of a season. His return to dominance helped the Rangers return to the Stanley Cup playoffs, but injuries to Jágr and others contributed to a four-game sweep in the first round by the New Jersey Devils.

Jágr scored his 1,400th point on a power-play goal against the Philadelphia Flyers on 2 March 2006, pushing him past Jari Kurri into second place all-time among European-born players. He later passed Stan Mikita to become the all-time leader.

On 18 March 2006, against the Toronto Maple Leafs, Jágr became only the sixth Rangers player in team history to break the 100-point barrier, and became the only Ranger right winger to score 100 points in a season.

On 27 March 2006, against the Buffalo Sabres, Jágr had a goal and an assist, which tied both the Rangers' single-season goal record of 52 (Adam Graves, 1993–94) and the Rangers' single-season points record of 109 (Jean Ratelle, 1971–72). Two nights later, on 29 March, Jágr passed Ratelle when he assisted on Petr Průcha's first-period goal against the New York Islanders' Rick DiPietro. On 8 April, against the Boston Bruins, Jágr scored his NHL-leading 53rd goal of the season, breaking the Rangers' single-season goals record.

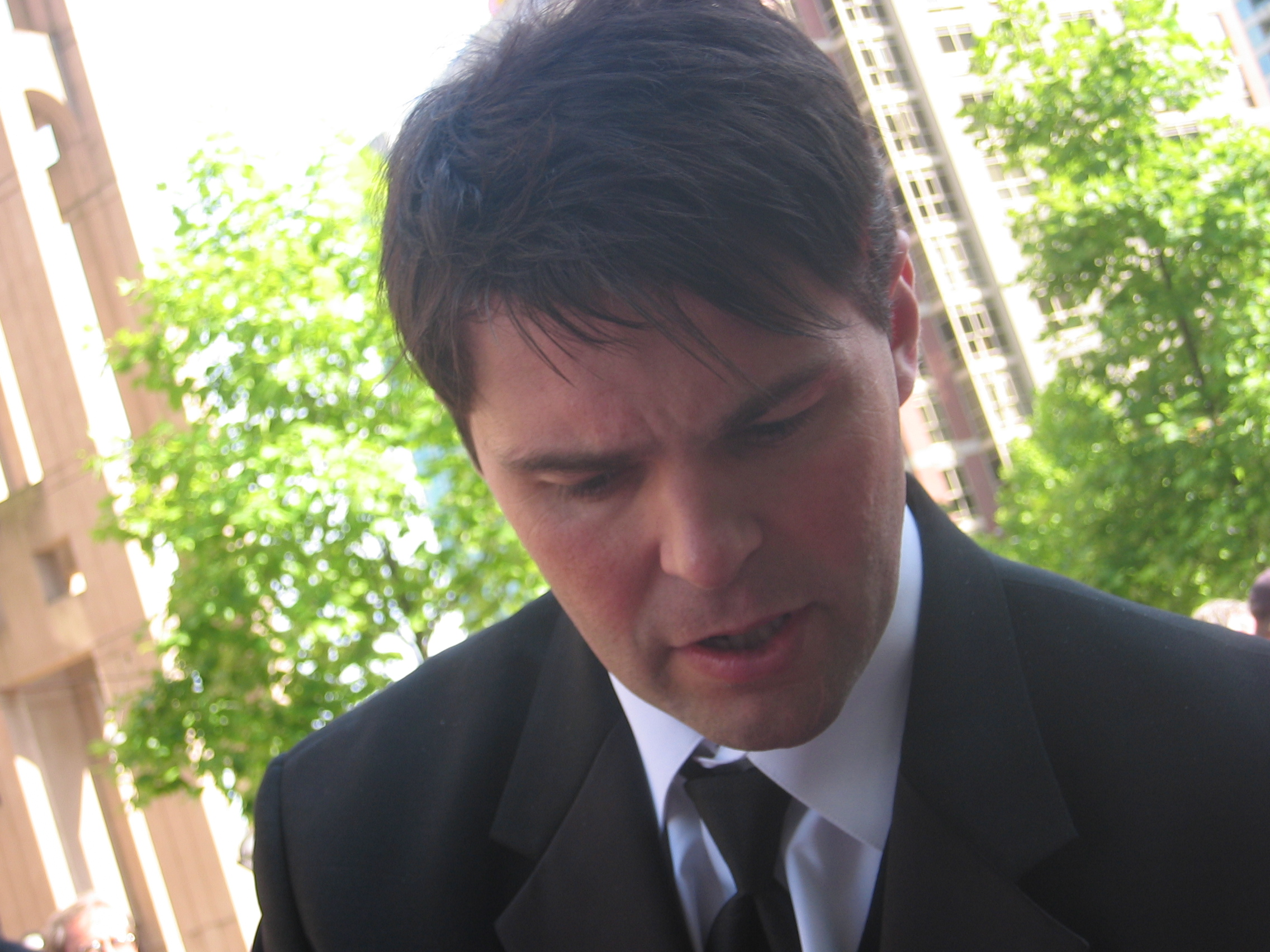
Jágr at the 2006 NHL Awards Show

After leading the NHL in points and goals for most of the 2005–06 season, Jágr was surpassed by the San Jose Sharks' duo of Joe Thornton (125 points) and Jonathan Cheechoo (56 goals), losing both the Art Ross and Maurice Richard trophies in the final week of the season. Jágr finished with 123 points, 54 goals, and 24 power-play goals, second in the NHL in all three categories. He also finished third in the NHL in both assists (69) and plus-minus (+34). However, just as in Washington, playoff success was not to be for Jágr, whose Rangers were swept in four games by New Jersey. In the series, he suffered a dislocated shoulder in the third period of the first game, which kept him from playing at his top form for the rest of the series. Jágr had surgery on the shoulder after the Rangers were eliminated from the playoffs.

Despite being inched out by Joe Thornton for the Art Ross Trophy and Hart Trophy (league MVP), Jágr won his third Lester B. Pearson Award as the NHL's most outstanding player. During his acceptance speech for the Award, Jágr said, "With this award, you get voted on by players you play against every night, and I think they understand the game better than the media." He has been named to seven NHL first All-Star teams.

On 5 October 2006, before the first game of the 2006–07 season (against his former team Washington), Jágr was named as the 24th captain in the history of the New York Rangers, replacing Mark Messier, who had retired before the 2005–06 season. Jágr scored a goal on his first shift in the game, just under 30 seconds into the new season.

Jágr became the 16th player to score 600 career NHL goals on 19 November 2006 against Tampa Bay goaltender Johan Holmqvist. Power play linemate Brendan Shanahan had scored his 600th goal almost three weeks earlier, making them the first teammates in NHL history to score their 600th goal in the same season.

On 10 February 2007, against Washington, Jágr earned an assist on a goal by Michal Rozsíval to record his 1,500th career point. He is only the 12th NHLer to reach this mark and the fourth-fastest player to do so after Marcel Dionne, Mario Lemieux, and Wayne Gretzky.

On 5 April 2007, against the Montreal Canadiens, Jágr scored his 30th goal of the 2006–07 season, tying the NHL record held by Mike Gartner. Thus, Jágr has now scored 30 or more goals in 15 consecutive seasons.

After a regular season slowed by a weak shoulder, Jágr then led the New York Rangers to a sweep of the Atlanta Thrashers in the Eastern Conference quarterfinals, the Rangers would fall to the Buffalo Sabres in game six of the conference semifinals.

On 14 November 2007, against New Jersey, Jágr scored his fourth goal of the 2007–08 season at the Prudential Center in Newark, making him the first player to score a goal in 53 different NHL arenas.

=== Avangard Omsk (2008–2011) ===
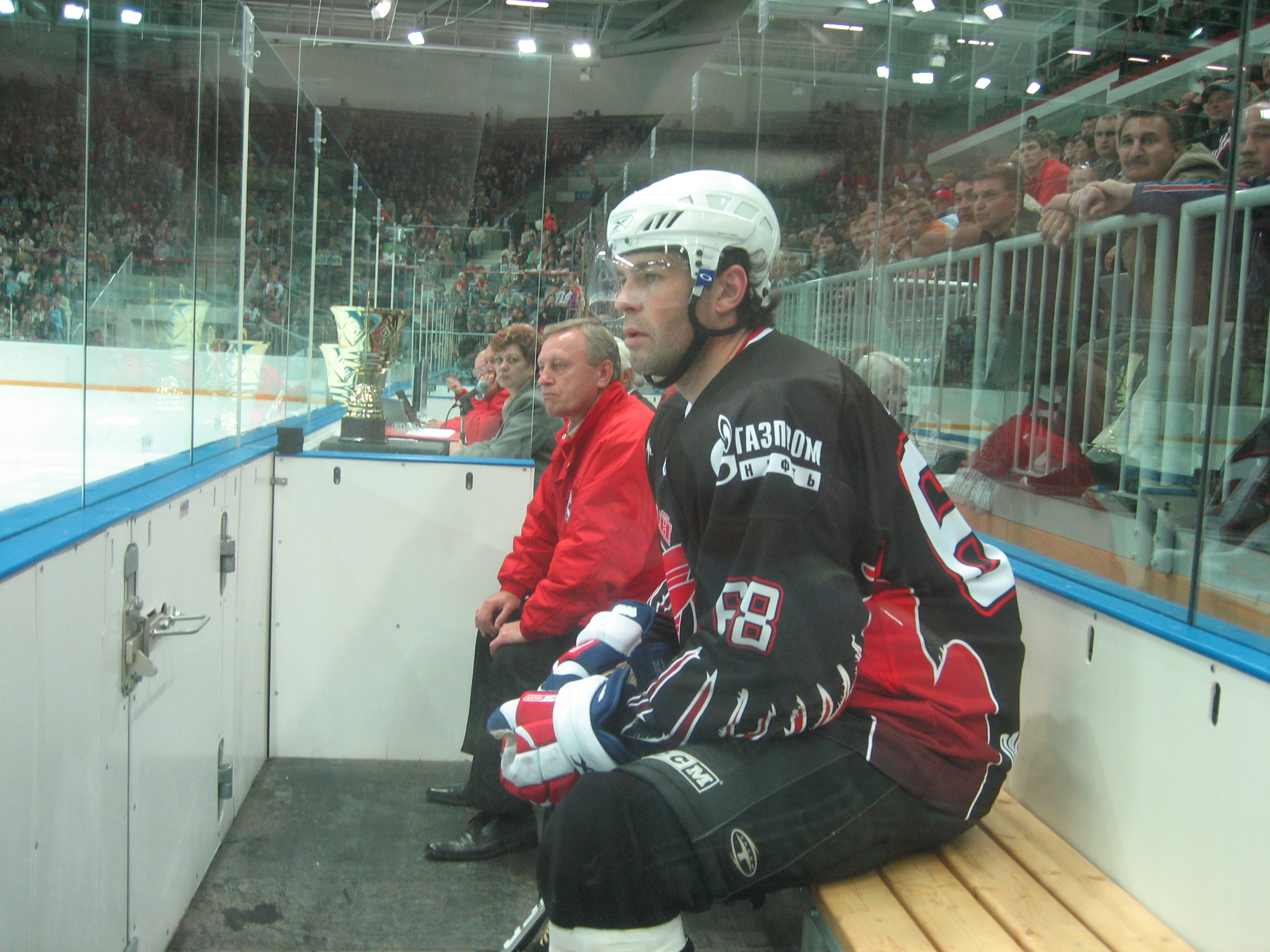
Jágr sitting in a penalty box while playing with Omsk, August 2008

On 3 July 2008, Jágr, an unrestricted free agent for the first time in his career, was informed by Rangers general manager Glen Sather that the club would not offer him a new contract. Sather admitted that the two sides never engaged in detailed negotiations for a new contract and that after many months of speculation, Jágr was "seriously considering" going to Russia to finish his career despite offers from other NHL teams. Jágr expressed a desire to possibly finish out his career at his father's club, HC Kladno. On 4 July, Jágr agreed to a two-year contract with Avangard Omsk of the Kontinental Hockey League (KHL); the contract was reported to pay Jágr the equivalent of US$5 million annually.

Jágr was named Avangard's captain on 30 January 2009. As a member of Avangard, Jágr was sitting next to Alexei Cherepanov, a first-round pick of the New York Rangers, who died during a game against Vityaz Chekhov. They were discussing the past shift when the 19-year-old Cherepanov collapsed onto Jágr on the bench at the Ice Hockey Center 2004 in Chekov.

In April 2009, Jágr publicly stated an interest in returning to the NHL, stating that he needed a break from the pressures of an 82-game NHL schedule. Jágr, who claimed to have lost 15 pounds since his last NHL season, and who was "practicing a lot harder than [he] ever did in [his] life", stated that he would be interested in joining the Edmonton Oilers because of the interest they showed in July 2008. However, following the expiration of his initial contract with Avangard, Jágr signed a new contract with Avangard for the 2010–11 season.

=== Philadelphia Flyers (2011–2012) ===
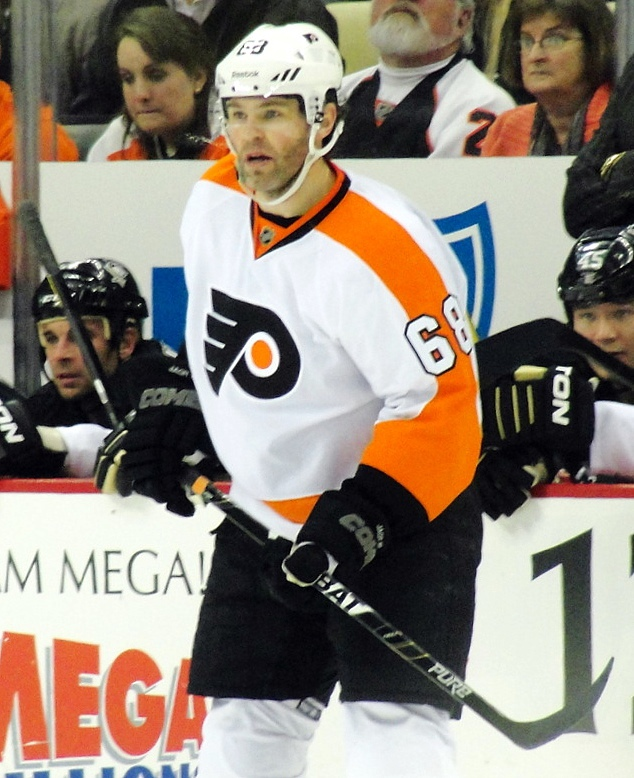
Jágr with the Flyers in 2011

On 1 July 2011, Jágr returned to the NHL, signing a one-year, $3.3 million contract with Pittsburgh's cross-state rival, the Philadelphia Flyers. He scored his 1,600th NHL point during his debut game with the Flyers, assisting on a Claude Giroux goal as the Flyers won their season opener 2–1 over the Boston Bruins on 6 October 2011. Typically playing on the first line with Giroux and Scott Hartnell, Jágr was among the top scorers during the start of the 2011–12 season. He scored his first and second goals as a Flyer on 24 October against the Toronto Maple Leafs. On 29 October 2011, against the Carolina Hurricanes, he scored his 650th and 651st NHL goals. He scored his only goal of the 2012 playoffs during Philadelphia's series against Pittsburgh. The Flyers were eliminated by the New Jersey Devils, who would ultimately become the 2012 Eastern Conference champions.

=== Dallas Stars (2012–2013) ===
On 3 July 2012, Jágr signed a one-year contract with the Dallas Stars reportedly worth $4.5 million. The signing marked Jágr's first time playing for a club in the Western Conference. Jágr said during a conference call two days later that the Montreal Canadiens had been his first choice as a free agent. "I always wanted to play in Canada, and I wanted to go to Montreal if I had a chance, but Montreal wasn't interested," Jágr said. "All of a sudden, I got a phone call from Stars' general manager Joe Nieuwendyk that Dallas was interested."

During the 2012–13 NHL lockout, Jágr played for his team, Rytíři Kladno, in the Czech Extraliga. During the lockout, he scored 24 goals and 33 assists in 34 games and, before leaving Kladno for the Stars, was in second place on Czech Extraliga's scoring list. After the NHL lockout ended, he made his debut as a Star on 19 January 2013, when he tallied two goals and two assists in a 4–3 victory over the Phoenix Coyotes.

Jágr reached the 1,000-assist mark on 29 March 2013 in a game against the Minnesota Wild, becoming just the 12th player to do so and the first non-Canadian NHLer to reach the milestone.

=== Boston Bruins (2013) ===
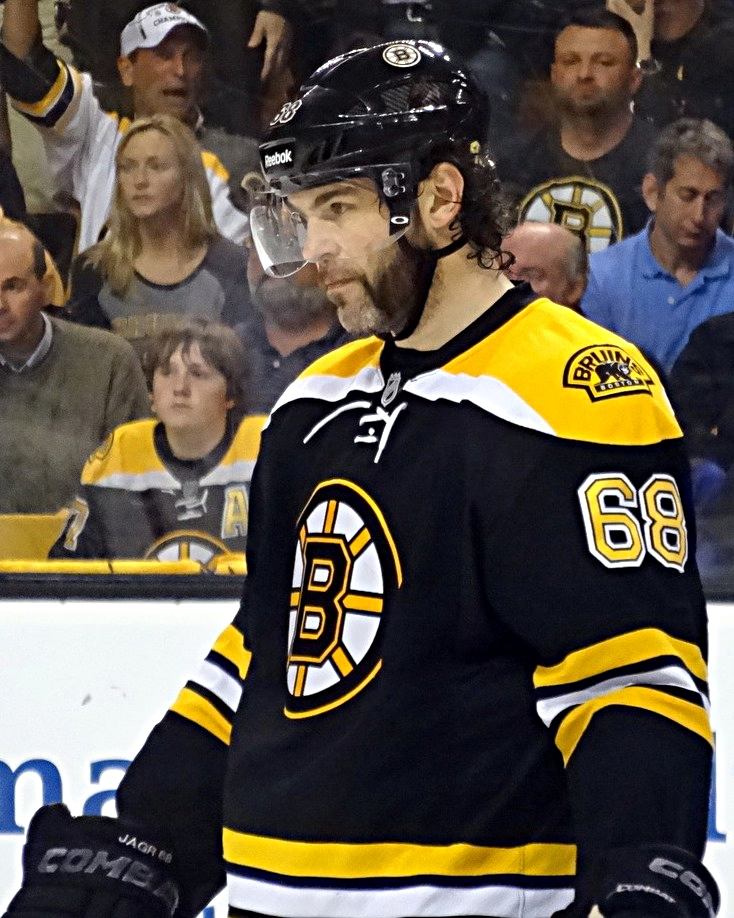
Jágr with the Bruins during the 2013 Eastern Conference finals

On 2 April 2013, Jágr was traded to the Boston Bruins in exchange for Lane MacDermid, Cody Payne and a conditional 2013 third-round pick. He made his Bruins debut on 4 April, scoring the lone goal in Boston's 1–0 win over the New Jersey Devils, and with his second Bruins goal, the first scored in a 3–0 shutout over the Florida Panthers on 21 April, Jágr tied the record for the most game-winning goals in an NHL career (118), previously set by Phil Esposito.

When Jágr played in the first game of the 2013 Stanley Cup Final on 12 June, he set a new record for the longest gap between Finals appearances at 21 years, surpassing the previous record of 19 years, which was established by Gary Roberts in 2008; coincidentally, both instances involved someone with the Penguins at one end of those streaks. Also coincidental was that, as in his previous Stanley Cup appearance, Jágr's opponents were the Presidents' Trophy-winning Chicago Blackhawks. He spent the bulk of the Bruins' lengthy playoff run on the top line with Brad Marchand and Patrice Bergeron. After the Bruins lost the Final to Chicago in six games, the team announced on 26 June that they did not intend to offer Jágr a new contract.

=== New Jersey Devils (2013–2015) ===
On 22 July 2013, Jágr signed a one-year contract with the New Jersey Devils; the contract included $2 million guaranteed and another $2 million as an incentive bonus if Jágr was to play in at least 40 games. Jágr, at age 41, hoped to help the Devils overcome the loss of Ilya Kovalchuk, who had previously departed for the KHL. Jágr scored his first goal as a Devil on 7 October, in a 5–4 shootout loss to the Edmonton Oilers. The goal came on the 23rd anniversary of his first NHL goal which, coincidentally, was against the Devils.

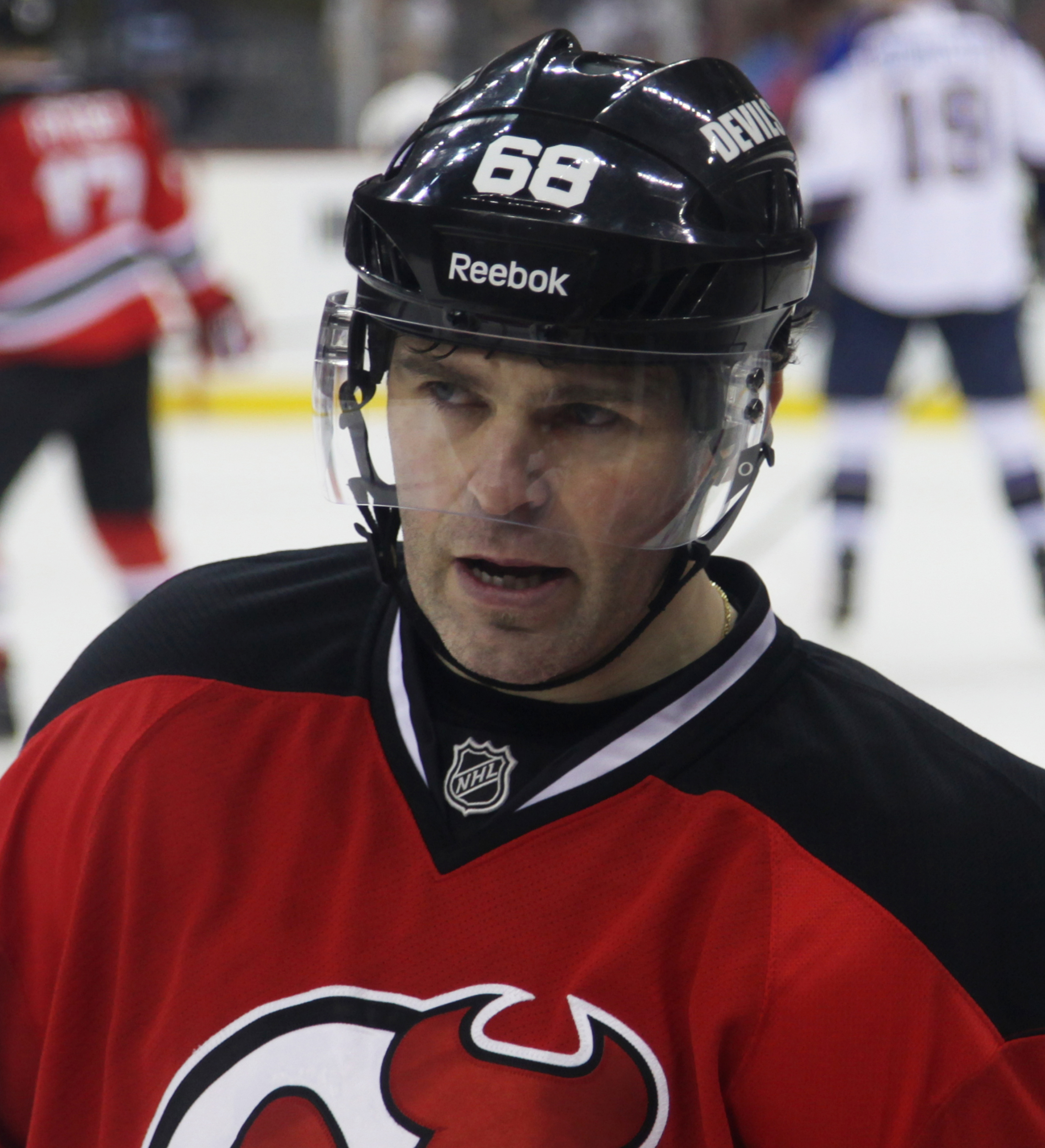
Jágr with the Devils in January 2014

On 21 November, Jágr tied Gordie Howe's record of game-winning goals with 121, with his 690th goal, which tied him in ninth place (with former teammate Mario Lemieux) for all-time goal-scoring leaders. On 20 December, he scored his 693rd goal, putting him in eighth place over Steve Yzerman. A day later, Jágr tied Mark Messier for seventh place in NHL history for goals scored with 694. Later in the season, on 14 January 2014, he scored his 695th goal, passing Messier, putting him 14 goals away from passing Mike Gartner. On 1 March, Jágr scored his 700th career NHL goal as the Devils won 6–1 against the New York Islanders at Nassau Veterans Memorial Coliseum. On 8 April, near the conclusion of the Devils' season, he was awarded the New Jersey Devils MVP Award at their annual team awards ceremony. He scored two points in his final game of the season (two assists in the third period), surpassing Gordie Howe for eighth place on the NHL's all-time list for career assists and tying Steve Yzerman for sixth on the all-time points list at 1,755. Jágr finished the season as the team's leading scorer, with his highest points total in a season since 2007–08. Jágr's play led the Devils to re-sign him to another one-year contract on 30 April. He became the joint sixth-highest scorer in NHL history in November 2014 after scoring his 708th NHL goal for the Devils against Boston. On 8 December, in his 1,500th NHL game, he moved ahead of Marcel Dionne for fifth place on the NHL's all-time points list with 1,772. On 3 January 2015, in a game against the Philadelphia Flyers, Jágr became the oldest player in NHL history to score a hat-trick at 42 years and 322 days. The record was previously held by Detroit Red Wings defenceman Nicklas Lidström.

=== Florida Panthers (2015–2017) ===
On 26 February 2015, Jágr was traded to the Florida Panthers in exchange for a 2015 second-round pick and a 2016 third-round pick. He made his team debut on 28 February in a 5–3 Panthers win over the Buffalo Sabres and registered his first points with the team in the following game on 1 March, posting a goal and an assist in a 4–3 win over the Tampa Bay Lightning. On 19 March, Jágr scored his 718th career goal against Detroit to move him past Phil Esposito and fifth on the all-time goal-scoring list. In a 9 April, 4–2 Panthers victory over the Bruins, Jágr registered two assists to give him 1,800 career points in the NHL and sole possession of fourth place on the all-time points list, surpassing former Penguins teammate Ron Francis. On 11 April, in the Panthers' season finale, Jágr reached 2,000 NHL points (including playoff games) when he assisted on a Jonathan Huberdeau goal. He scored his 800th NHL goal (including playoffs) later in the third period. On 12 April, one day after the end of the 2014–15 regular season, Jágr signed a new one-year, $3.5 million contract with Florida for the 2015–16 season.

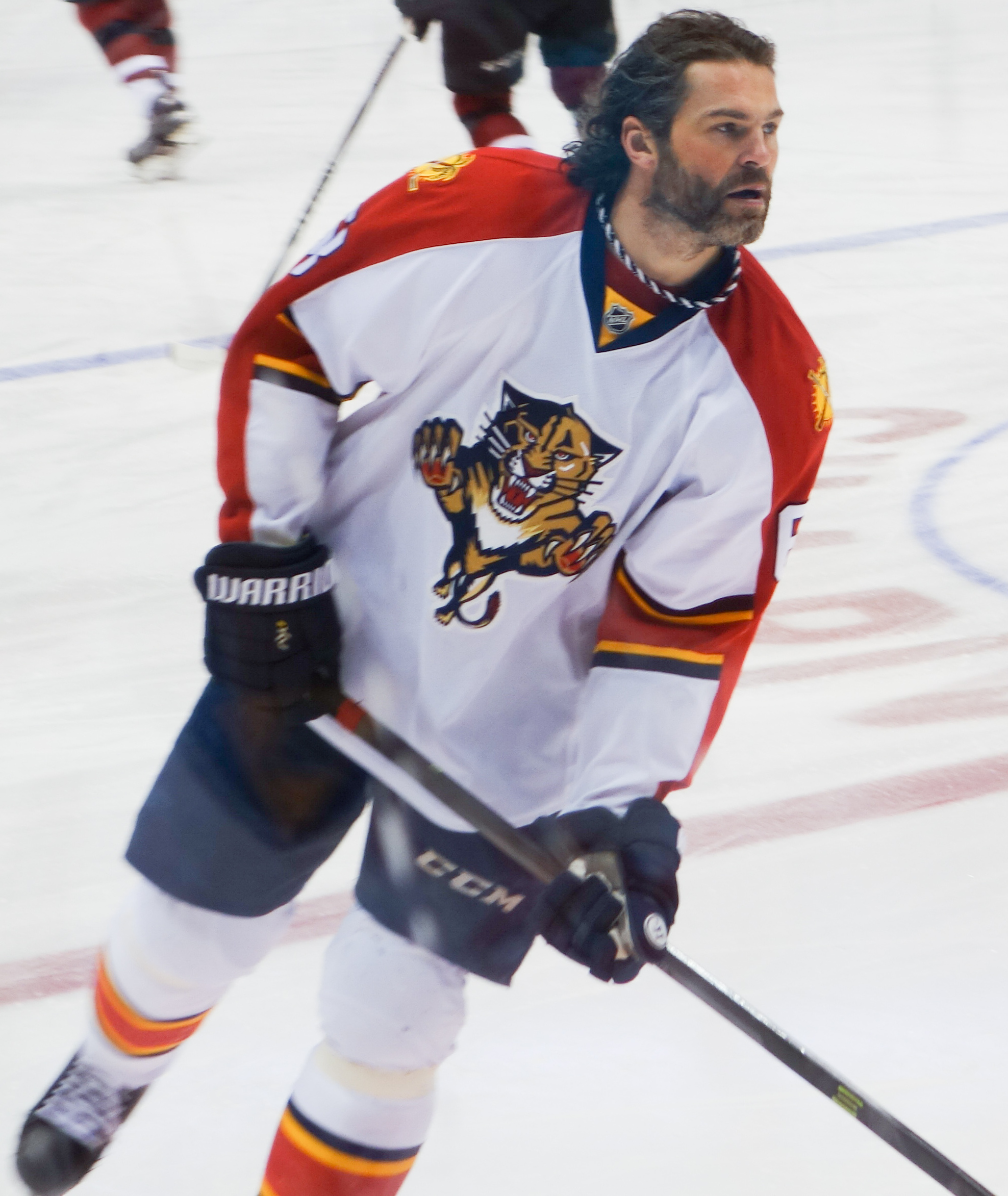
Jágr with the Panthers in 2016

Jágr reached multiple milestones as a Panther. On 20 December 2015, he scored his 732nd goal, passing Marcel Dionne for fourth place in NHL history. On 4 February 2016, Jágr became the sixth player in NHL history to record 1,100 career assists. On 20 February, he scored his 742nd goal, surpassing Brett Hull for third place in NHL history. In a 7 March, 5–4 overtime loss to the Bruins, an assist on Aleksander Barkov's goal put Jágr at 1,851 career points, passing Gordie Howe on the all-time points list and putting him in sole possession of third place overall. With the Panthers qualifying for the 2016 playoffs, Jágr played in his first playoff series since the 2013 Stanley Cup Finals. Though he only registered two assists in the Panthers' six-game first-round exit to the Islanders (who would win their first playoff series since 1993), he became the fifth NHL player all-time to record 200 career playoff points.

At age 44, Jágr led the Panthers in scoring with 66 points. In reward for his strong play and leadership abilities, the team announced on 5 May 2016 that they had signed Jágr to a new one-year, $4 million contract.

On 20 October 2016, Jágr became the third player in NHL history to score 750 goals. On 22 December 2016, he scored his 1,888th career point, surpassing Mark Messier to become second in career points, and on 15 February 2017, his 45th birthday, he became the second player to register his 1,900th NHL point.

In 2017 on Twitter, as a free agent, Jágr tweeted: "FA 1994 - all GMs called, FA 2017- 0 calls" accompanied by a trophy emoji and a smiley emoji and pictures taken in 1994 and 2017. In the 1994 picture, a smiling Jágr is on the phone with an unspecified general manager. In the 2017 picture, he looks at his mobile phone with a puzzled expression. The Panthers organization announced shortly after that they would not offer Jágr a new contract.

=== Calgary Flames (2017–2018) ===
On 4 October 2017, Jágr signed a one-year contract with the Calgary Flames. Jágr had indicated before that he would like to play professionally until age 50, but later said that it would be very likely that he would stop playing after the 2017–18 season, at which point he would be 46. He noted the tendency of teams to focus on younger players to the exclusion of older ones like himself, which he considers understandable and in light of which he remarked, "I was pretty lucky." The Flames were Jágr's ninth NHL team, but his first Canadian team, which prompted him to say, "I want to get the experience so I can one day say I played for a Canadian team. So I'm here."

On 9 November 2017 against the Detroit Red Wings, Jágr scored his first goal as a Flame, earning two points in a 6–3 win. However, on 6 January 2018, it was reported that Jágr and the Flames were negotiating the termination of his contract, as injuries had limited Jágr to a career-low seven points (including the one goal above) in 22 games. On 14 January 2018, Jágr was placed on the injured reserve, retroactive to 31 December 2017, while the Flames called up Ryan Lomberg from their American Hockey League (AHL) affiliate, the Stockton Heat, in his place. On 28 January, it was reported that Jágr was placed on waivers, signalling the end of his brief tenure with the Flames; he cleared waivers the following day and was assigned to Rytíři Kladno in the WSM Liga.

=== Return to Kladno (2018–present) ===
On 3 February 2018, Jágr played his first game for his hometown team, and his first game since 31 December 2017, playing nearly 20 minutes and recording three assists. In his fifth game for Kladno, he was injured and remained sidelined for the rest of the season with a knee injury. He played a few seconds in ten playoff games to be eligible for participation in the playoff finals. On 14 May, Jágr announced his plans to remain with Kladno for his 30th professional season. On 19 April, Jágr scored four goals in one game as Kladno was promoted to the top-flight Czech Extraliga.

In 2022, at the age of 50 and spending most of his games in the dressing room, Jágr admitted he was considering retirement, being too busy with the team administration and lacking the motivation for the physically demanding game, saying that at most he will "have to force myself to go play" in the alumni game of the 2023 NHL Winter Classic featuring the Penguins. The 2023–24 season marked Jágr's 36th consecutive season of professional ice hockey, and in February 2023 he scored his 1,100th professional goal. Jágr has said that the biggest fear regarding retirement is the potential loss of sponsors for Kladno, thereby jeopardizing Kladno's viability as a team.

On 20 December 2023, at 51, Jágr played his first game of his 36th professional season, recording an assist in a 4–3 loss.

On 18 April 2024, at 52 years and 63 days, Jágr scored against VHK Vsetín to become the oldest player ever to score a goal in a professional competition. He thus broke the record of Gordie Howe, who scored the last goal of his career at 52 years and six days.

During the 2024 off-season, Jágr hinted on multiple occasions that he would retire from professional ice hockey at the conclusion of the 2024–25 season. However, following Kladno's final game of the season, Jágr avoided answering questions on the topic of retirement, leading to speculation that he would return for a 38th professional season.

On 28 July 2025, Jágr skated with the Kladno team on the opening day of training camp, further fuelling speculation that he would continue playing. Jágr made his season debut for Kladno on 17 October, in a 3–1 victory over HC Vítkovice Ridera.

== International play ==
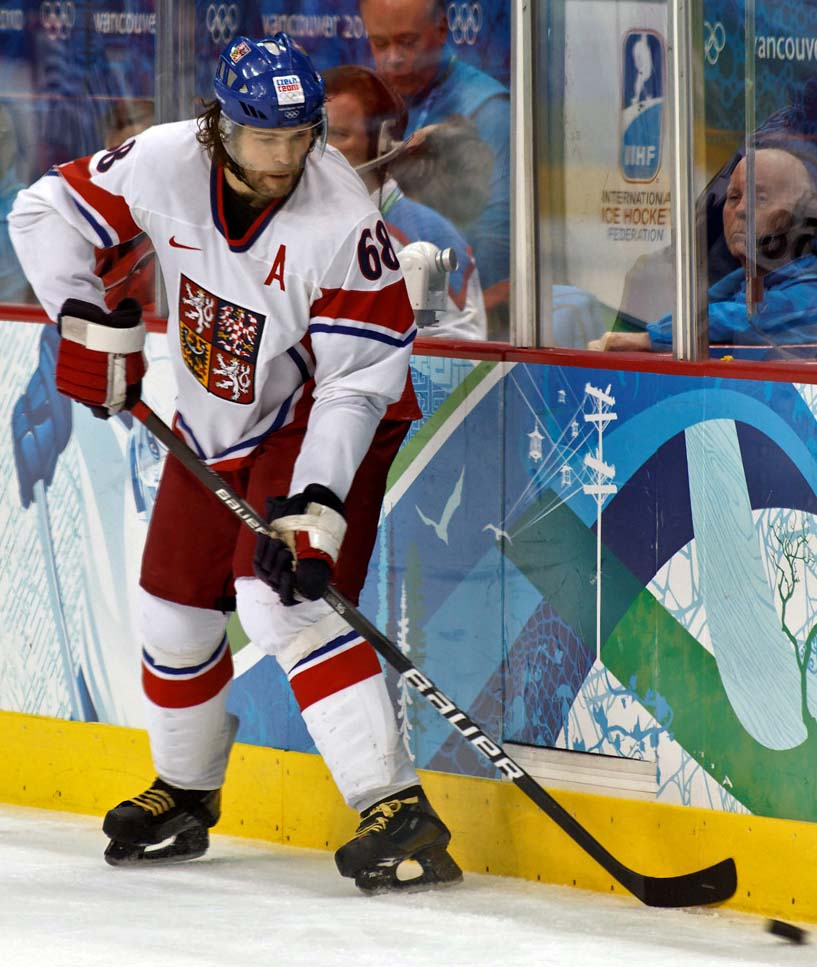
- Jágr during the 2010 Winter Olympics in Vancouver

Medal record

Men's ice hockey

Representing Czech Republic

Winter Olympic
Gold medal – first place	1998 Nagano	
Bronze medal – third place	2006 Turin	

World Cup
Bronze medal – third place	2004 World Cup	

World Championships
Gold medal – first place	2005 Vienna	
Gold medal – first place	2010 Cologne	
Bronze medal – third place	2011 Bratislava	

European Champions Cup
Gold medal – first place	2005 Saint Petersburg	

Representing Czechoslovakia

World Championships
Bronze medal – third place	1990 Bern	

European Junior Championship
Silver medal – second place	1989 Kiev	

World Junior Championship
Bronze medal – third place	1990 Finland	

Jágr has represented his country many times. In 1994, he and Pittsburgh Penguins teammate Martin Straka arrived in the middle of the 1994 World Championships after Pittsburgh's elimination from the Stanley Cup playoffs. Czech fans' expectations were high as Jágr was an NHL star, but before the team could integrate him, the Czechs lost their quarterfinal game and were eliminated. Jágr was also hurt in numerous other games.

The 1996 World Cup of Hockey also did not see Jágr at his best. The flu hampered his performance and it only underscored the poor play of the whole team — after losing 7–3 to Finland, 3–0 to Sweden and even 7–1 to a relatively weak Germany, the team did not qualify for the tournament's playoffs.

The team's recent failures, however, were mitigated in 1998 when the Czech Republic won the men's gold medal in the 1998 Winter Olympics in Nagano, Japan. It was only the third gold medal for Czech or Czechoslovak athletes from the Winter Olympics and is still fondly remembered.

Jágr did not play in the 1996, 1999, 2000 nor 2001 World Championships in which the Czech Republic won the gold medals. He was, however, a team member at the 2004 World Championship in Prague, where the expectations were high. However, after the team won all the games in the group, they lost in the quarterfinal game, stumbling out of the tournament.

The 2005 edition of the tournament finally brought a gold medal to Jágr. Although he broke his finger in an early game against Germany, he played with it bandaged during the tournament, leading his team to victory.

More injuries struck Jágr in the 2006 Winter Olympics in Turin. He was injured after a hit from Finland's Jarkko Ruutu, requiring stitches to his eyebrow. However, the injury was not as severe as first anticipated, and Jágr could play in the following games, though he could not finish the bronze medal game due to muscle injury. Despite the trouble, Jágr won his second career Olympic medal. In 2010, Jágr was his nation's flag bearer at the 2010 Winter Olympics. Still, in the men's ice hockey tournament, the Czechs finished a disappointing seventh after defeating Finland in the quarterfinals. Jágr again represented his country at the 2014 Winter Olympics in Sochi, scoring two goals and one assist in five games as the Czech Republic again lost in the quarterfinals.

After losing to Sweden in a battle for a bronze medal on 2014 World Championship, Jágr announced the end of his career in international play with the Czech national team, focusing his efforts on returning to the NHL playoffs after New Jersey failed to qualify in 2014. However, Jágr stepped back from his decision after being called up to the Czech team for the 2015 World Championship in Prague and Ostrava, making the team's roster. On 1 May, he scored a goal in the Czechs' 6–5 loss to Sweden, his 50th for the national team, to become the oldest player to score at the World Championship.

In the Czech Republic's quarterfinal game against Finland, Jágr scored one assist and two goals, including the game-winning goal. At the end of the tournament, despite the Czechs' loss in the bronze medal game, Jágr was named the tournament's most valuable player.

== Personal life ==
Jágr resides in the Czech Republic during the off-season. His father, also named Jaromír Jágr (1940–2022), owned a chain of hotels and served as president of HC Kladno. Jágr credited his physical strength and penchant for exercise to growing up on a farm and working all year long.

Jágr wears the number 68, which he has worn through his entire career, in honour of the Prague Spring that occurred in Czechoslovakia in 1968 and his grandfather, who died while in prison that same year and had earlier been imprisoned for opposing the collectivization of his farm in the post-war Communist takeover of Czechoslovakia. In any interviews when asked about his number, Jágr explains that he wears it not due to bad relations with Russian people, but rather due to disaffection with Communism. During his time with the New Jersey Devils, Jágr was granted special exception to keep wearing number 68, as then-general manager Lou Lamoriello had a policy in place which generally forbade players from wearing any number higher than 35. Jágr names former United States President Ronald Reagan as his hero for his work towards ending communism in Europe.

Jágr has been a long-time supporter of the liberal conservative Civic Democratic Party (ODS), stating in 2004 that he "had always" voted for the party. In the previous election, he appeared on the party's billboards and was among its sponsors. On 26 May 2010, Jágr announced that he was backing the Civic Democrats and its leader Petr Nečas. At the press conference, he said, "I realize that there will be elections in two to three days. I would like their outcome to be good." He also urged the party not to forget about sports when distributing money. "We all know what would happen if the young did not practice any sport. If children practice some sport, they do not have time for other things such as alcohol."

Jágr is an Orthodox Christian; he was baptized in 2001 by Prague's metropolitan. He began to speak more publicly about his faith during his three-year stint in Russia, a historically Orthodox nation.

Although he has repeatedly denied that he has a gambling problem, Jágr admitted in 2003 that he settled debts totaling $950,000 with two internet gambling sites between 1998 and 2002. The first of these incidents centered on Belize-based website CaribSports and its owner, William Caesar, to which Jágr owed $500,000. Sports Illustrated reported that Jágr agreed to make monthly payments to Caesar to settle the debt, and Caesar leaked the story to the press when Jágr stopped making payments. In 2003, the Internal Revenue Service (IRS) filed a $3.27 million lien against him for unpaid taxes for the 2001 tax year. Only a few months before, Jágr had settled a $350,000 claim for taxes dating to 1999. In the summer of 2006, Jágr sued his former accountant over a tax form that was supposed to have been filed in 2003, claiming that the form would have saved him $6 million had it been timely filed.

In 2015, an 18-year-old model attempted to extort $2,000 from Jágr, threatening to post a photo of them in bed; Jágr responded, "I don’t care," leading to the picture being published online.

Jágr's longevity in the NHL spawned a fan club known as "The Traveling Jagrs", a group of hockey fans from the Alberta cities of Calgary and Camrose who share interest in the player. The group dressed in the sweater, hockey socks and pant shells of 11 of Jágr's teams (his nine NHL teams, the NHL All-Star team and the Czech national team) plus long black wigs in reference to Jágr's traditional hair-style. Typically, the club travelled once or twice a year to see him play in person, but after Jágr signed with the Flames, they announced that they would be a more regular fixture at games. When Jagr's number 68 was retired by the Pittsburgh Penguins in 2024, the Traveling Jagrs made the trip one last time to watch their namesake player skate during warm-ups, and see his banner raised to the rafters.

In October 2025, Jágr published an autobiography named JÁ68 that was released by the newspaper Sport. The book presented insight into his life, career, faith, and values, and also included previously unpublished photographs and reflections on the meaning of sport and life.

== Career statistics ==
=== Regular season and playoffs ===
Bold indicates led league

			Regular season					Playoffs
Season	Team	League	GP	G	A	Pts	PIM	GP	G	A	Pts	PIM
1984–85	Poldi SONP Kladno	TCH U18	34	24	17	41	—	—	—	—	—	—
1985–86	Poldi SONP Kladno	TCH U18	36	41	29	70	—	—	—	—	—	—
1986–87	Poldi SONP Kladno	TCH U20	30	35	35	70	—	—	—	—	—	—
1987–88	Poldi SONP Kladno	TCH U20	35	57	27	84	—	—	—	—	—	—
1988–89	Poldi SONP Kladno	TCH	29	3	3	6	4	10	5	7	12	0
1989–90	Poldi SONP Kladno	TCH	42	22	28	50	14	9	8	2	10	4
1990–91	Pittsburgh Penguins	NHL	80	27	30	57	42	24	3	10	13	6
1991–92	Pittsburgh Penguins	NHL	70	32	37	69	34	21	11	13	24	6
1992–93	Pittsburgh Penguins	NHL	81	34	60	94	61	12	5	4	9	23
1993–94	Pittsburgh Penguins	NHL	80	32	67	99	61	6	2	4	6	16
1994–95	Poldi SONP Kladno	CZE	11	8	14	22	10	—	—	—	—	—
1994–95	HC Bolzano	ITA	1	0	0	0	0	—	—	—	—	—
1994–95	HC Bolzano	ALP	5	8	8	16	4	—	—	—	—	—
1994–95	Schalker Haie 87	DEU.2	1	1	10	11	0	—	—	—	—	—
1994–95	Pittsburgh Penguins	NHL	48	32	38	**70**	37	12	10	5	15	6
1995–96	Pittsburgh Penguins	NHL	82	62	87	149	96	18	11	12	23	18
1996–97	Pittsburgh Penguins	NHL	63	47	48	95	40	5	4	4	8	4
1997–98	Pittsburgh Penguins	NHL	77	35	**67**	**102**	64	6	4	5	9	2
1998–99	Pittsburgh Penguins	NHL	81	44	**83**	**127**	66	9	5	7	12	16
1999–2000	Pittsburgh Penguins	NHL	63	42	54	**96**	50	11	8	8	16	6
2000–01	Pittsburgh Penguins	NHL	81	52	**69**	**121**	42	16	2	10	12	18
2001–02	Washington Capitals	NHL	69	31	48	79	30	—	—	—	—	—
2002–03	Washington Capitals	NHL	75	36	41	77	38	6	2	5	7	2
2003–04	Washington Capitals	NHL	46	16	29	45	26	—	—	—	—	—
2003–04	New York Rangers	NHL	31	15	14	29	12	—	—	—	—	—
2004–05	HC Rabat Kladno	CZE	17	11	17	28	16	—	—	—	—	—
2004–05	Avangard Omsk	RSL	32	16	22	38	63	11	4	10	14	22
2005–06	New York Rangers	NHL	82	54	69	123	72	3	0	1	1	2
2006–07	New York Rangers	NHL	82	30	66	96	78	10	5	6	11	12
2007–08	New York Rangers	NHL	82	25	46	71	58	10	5	10	15	12
2008–09	Avangard Omsk	KHL	55	25	28	53	62	9	4	5	9	4
2009–10	Avangard Omsk	KHL	51	22	20	42	50	3	1	1	2	0
2010–11	Avangard Omsk	KHL	49	19	31	50	48	14	2	7	9	8
2011–12	Philadelphia Flyers	NHL	73	19	35	54	30	11	1	7	8	2
2012–13	Rytíři Kladno	CZE	34	24	33	57	28	—	—	—	—	—
2012–13	Dallas Stars	NHL	34	14	12	26	20	—	—	—	—	—
2012–13	Boston Bruins	NHL	11	2	7	9	2	22	0	10	10	8
2013–14	New Jersey Devils	NHL	82	24	43	67	46	—	—	—	—	—
2014–15	New Jersey Devils	NHL	57	11	18	29	42	—	—	—	—	—
2014–15	Florida Panthers	NHL	20	6	12	18	6	—	—	—	—	—
2015–16	Florida Panthers	NHL	79	27	39	66	48	6	0	2	2	4
2016–17	Florida Panthers	NHL	82	16	30	46	56	—	—	—	—	—
2017–18	Calgary Flames	NHL	22	1	6	7	10	—	—	—	—	—
2017–18	Rytíři Kladno	CZE.2	5	0	4	4	0	10	0	0	0	0
2018–19	Rytíři Kladno	CZE.2	4	1	3	4	4	19	12	6	18	20
2019–20	Rytíři Kladno	CZE	38	15	14	29	28	—	—	—	—	—
2020–21	Rytíři Kladno	CZE.2	19	2	10	12	8	16	2	8	10	8
2021–22	Rytíři Kladno	CZE	43	8	11	19	20	5	0	2	2	0
2022–23	Rytíři Kladno	CZE	26	5	9	14	16	4	0	0	0	2
2023–24	Rytíři Kladno	CZE	15	0	4	4	10	3	1	1	2	0
2024–25	Rytíři Kladno	CZE	39	5	11	16	16	—	—	—	—	—
2025–26	Rytíři Kladno	CZE	6	0	1	1	10	—	—	—	—	—
TCH/CZE totals			300	101	145	246	172	31	14	12	26	6
NHL totals			1,733	766	1,155	1,921	1,167	208	78	123	201	163
RSL/KHL totals			187	82	101	183	223	37	11	23	34	34

=== International ===
Year	Team	Event	Result	GP	G	A	Pts	PIM
1989	Czechoslovakia	EJC	2nd place, silver medalist(s)	5	8	4	12	2
1990	Czechoslovakia	WJC	3rd place, bronze medalist(s)	7	5	13	18	6
1990	Czechoslovakia	WC	3rd place, bronze medalist(s)	10	3	2	5	2
1991	Czechoslovakia	CC	6th	5	1	0	1	0
1994	Czech Republic	WC	7th	3	0	2	2	2
1996	Czech Republic	WCH	8th	3	1	0	1	2
1998	Czech Republic	OG	1st place, gold medalist(s)	6	1	4	5	2
2002	Czech Republic	OG	7th	4	2	3	5	4
2002	Czech Republic	WC	5th	7	4	4	8	2
2004	Czech Republic	WC	5th	7	5	4	9	6
2004	Czech Republic	WCH	3rd place, bronze medalist(s)	5	1	1	2	2
2005	Czech Republic	WC	1st place, gold medalist(s)	8	2	7	9	2
2006	Czech Republic	OG	3rd place, bronze medalist(s)	8	2	5	7	6
2009	Czech Republic	WC	6th	7	3	6	9	0
2010	Czech Republic	OG	7th	5	2	1	3	6
2010	Czech Republic	WC	1st place, gold medalist(s)	9	3	4	7	12
2011	Czech Republic	WC	3rd place, bronze medalist(s)	9	5	4	9	4
2014	Czech Republic	OG	6th	5	2	1	3	2
2014	Czech Republic	WC	4th	10	4	4	8	12
2015	Czech Republic	WC	4th	10	6	3	9	8
Junior totals				12	13	17	30	8
Senior totals				121	47	55	102	74

== Awards ==
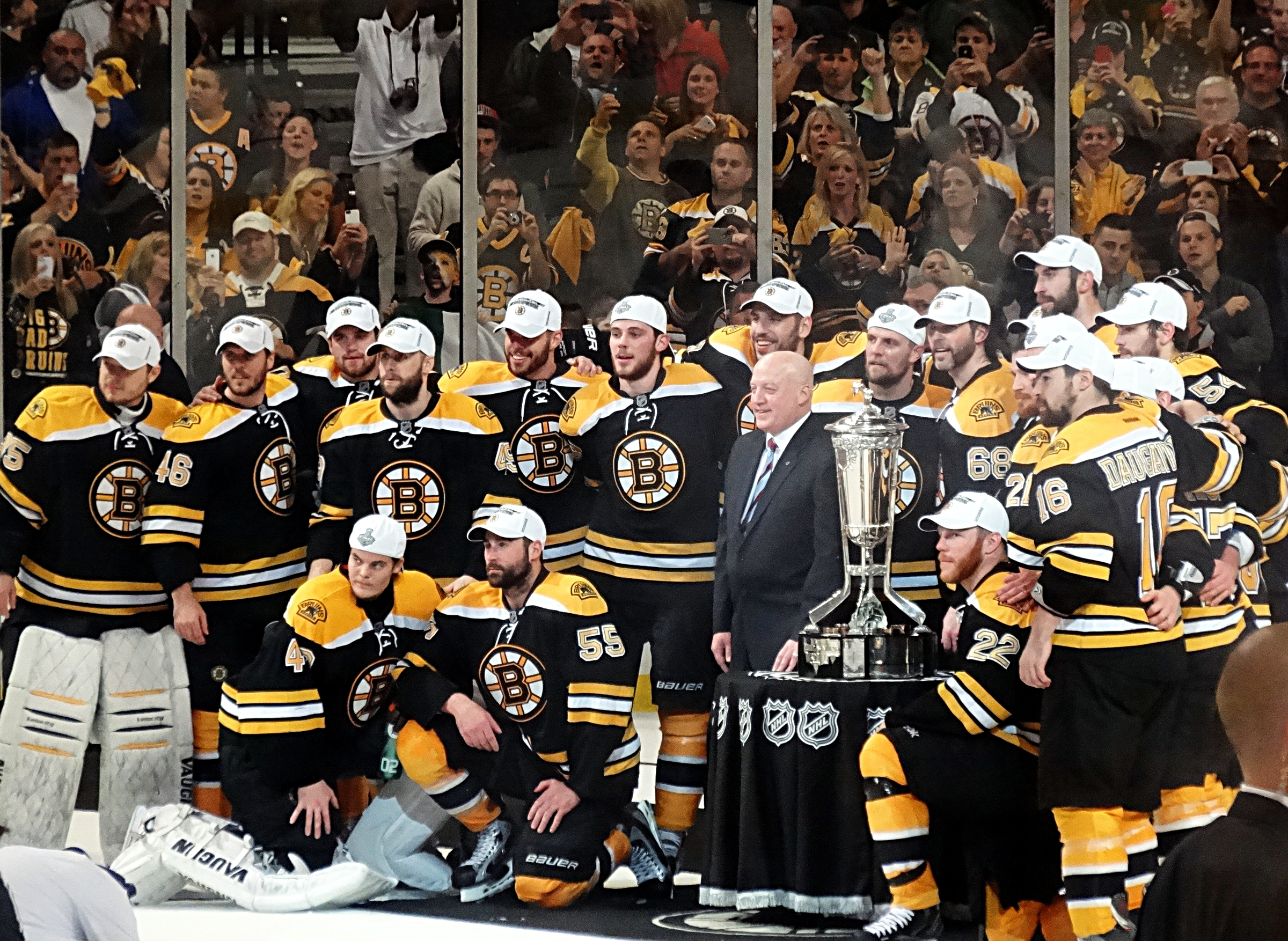
Jágr and the Bruins with the Prince of Wales Trophy following the Eastern Conference finals series in 2013. Jágr (#68) is to the immediate right of the trophy.

=== NHL ===
Award	Year(s) awarded
Stanley Cup champion	1991, 1992
NHL All-Rookie Team	1991
NHL All-Star Game	1992, 1993, 1994, 1996, 1997, 1998, 1999, 2000, 2001, 2002, 2003, 2004, 2016
Art Ross Trophy	1995, 1998, 1999, 2000, 2001
NHL first All-Star team	1995, 1996, 1998, 1999, 2000, 2001, 2006
NHL second All-Star team	1997
Hart Memorial Trophy	1999
Lester B. Pearson Award	1999, 2000, 2006
Bill Masterton Memorial Trophy	2016

=== Czech awards ===
Award	Year(s) awarded
Golden Hockey Stick	1995, 1996, 1999, 2000, 2002, 2005, 2006, 2007, 2008, 2011, 2014, 2016
Czech Sportsperson of the Year (team)	1998, 2005, 2010
Czech Sportsperson of the Year (individual)	2005

=== International ===
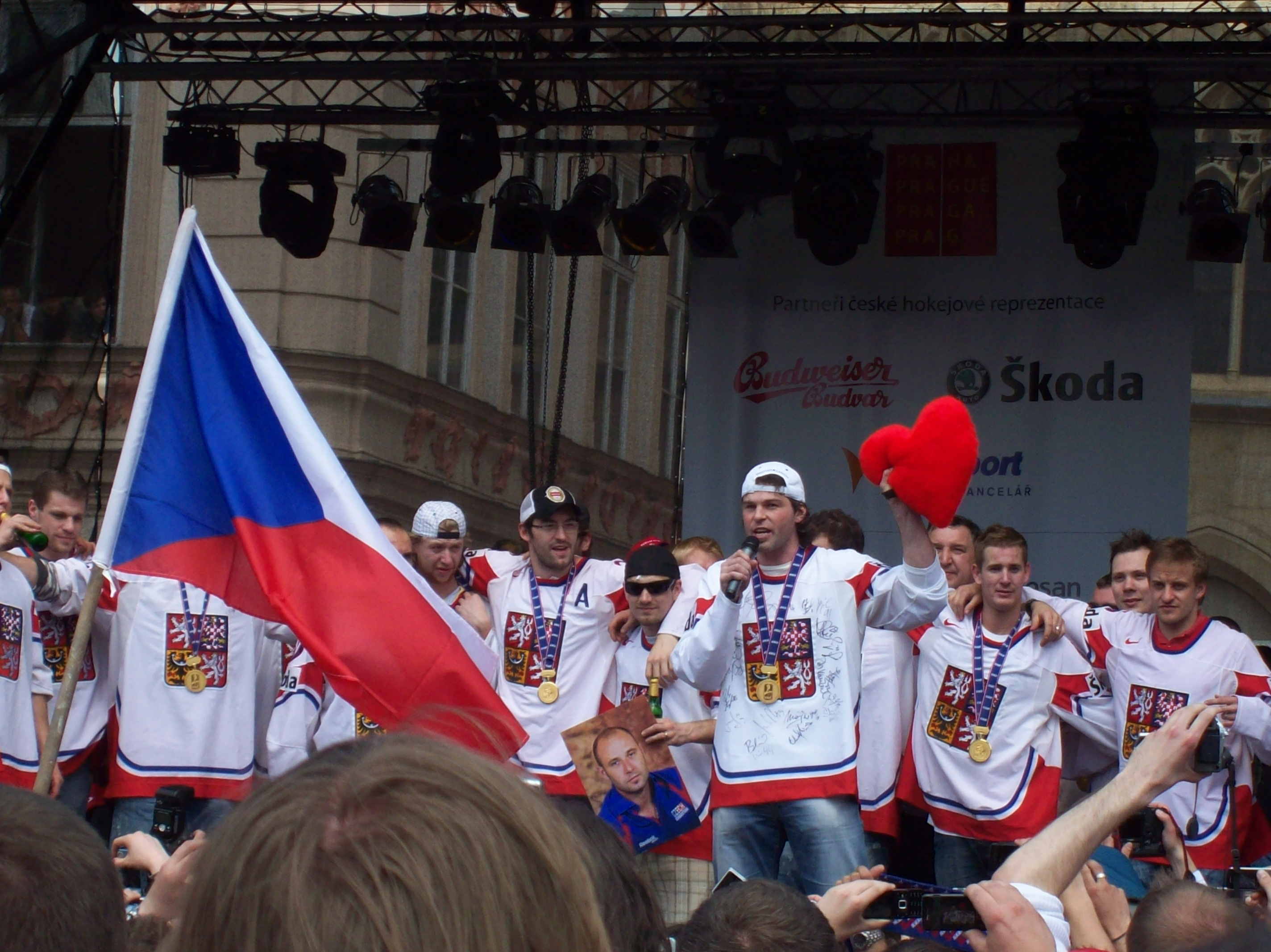
Jágr with his Czech teammates after winning gold at the 2010 World Championship.

Award	Year(s) awarded
WC All-Star team	2004, 2005, 2011, 2015
WC Best Forward	2011
WC Most Valuable Player	2015
IIHF All-Time Czech Team	2020
IIHF Hall of Fame	2024

=== KHL ===
Award	Year(s) awarded
KHL All-Star Game	2009, 2010, 2011
Continental Cup	2011

=== Other ===
Award	Year(s) awarded
Six Nations Tournament champion	1995
Best NHL Player ESPY Award	2006
Medal of Merit (second grade)	2010

== NHL records ==
These records are as of 9 October 2021 for regular season games unless stated otherwise.

- Most career points by a right wing – 1921
- Most career assists by a right wing – 1142
- Most single-season points by a right wing – 149
- 2nd most single-season assists by a right wing - 87 (Nikita Kucherov - 100)
- Most single-season points by a European-born player – 149
- Most career assists by a European-born player – 1142
- Most career points by a European-born player – 1921
- Most career game-tying goals by a European-born player – 11 (tied with Teemu Selänne)
- Most career playoff game-winning goals by a European-born player – 16
- Most consecutive 30-goal seasons (1991–2007) – 15 (shared with Mike Gartner and Alexander Ovechkin; included the shortened 1994–95 season, 48 games)
- Most consecutive 70-point seasons (15) (including the shortened 1994–95 NHL season, 48 games)
- Longest gap between Stanley Cup Finals appearances – 21 years (1992–2013)
- Only player to play in the Stanley Cup Finals as a teenager and at over 40 years of age
- Oldest player to score 60 points in a season
- Oldest player to score a hat-trick (42 years and 322 days old)
- Most different teams played on by a 1000-point scorer - 9 (tied with Paul Coffey)

=== Pittsburgh Penguins records ===
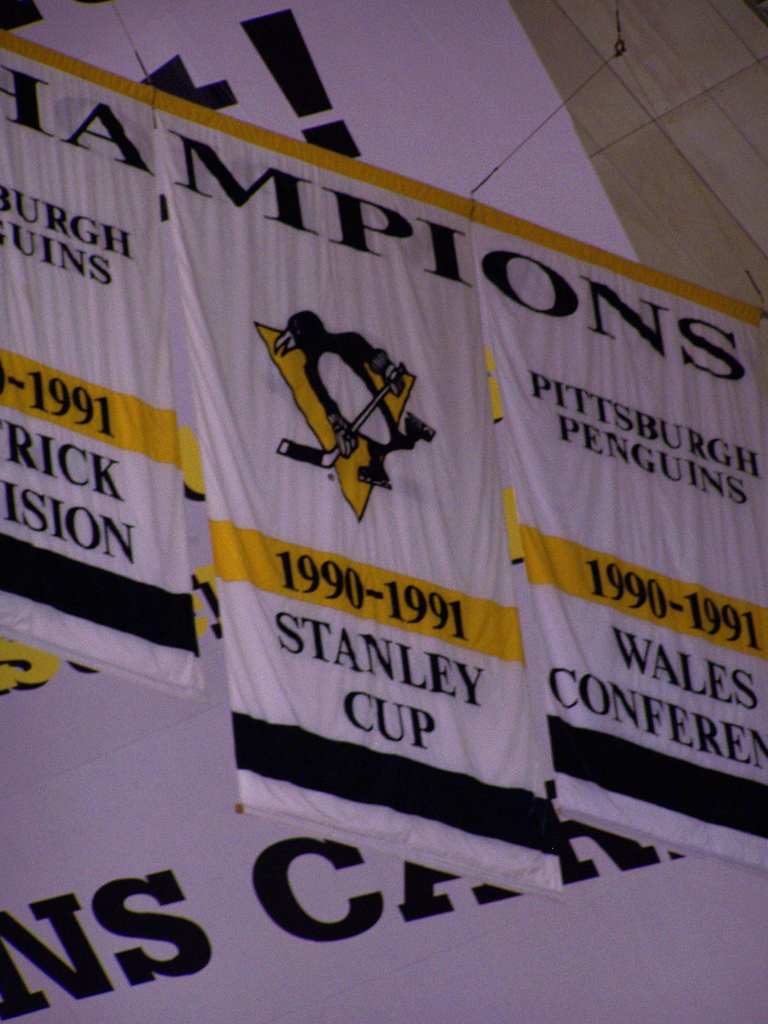
Pittsburgh Penguins 1991 Stanley Cup champions banner. Jágr was a part of the Penguins' roster that year

- Most single-season points by a right wing – 149
- Most single-season assists by a right wing – 87
- Most single-season assists by a European-born player – 87
- Most single-season power-play goals by a European-born player – 20
- Most single-season game-winning goals – 12
- Most single-season shots on goal – 403
- Most career points by a right wing – 1079
- Most career points by a European-born player – 1079
- Most career goals by a right wing – 439
- Most career goals by a European-born player – 439
- Most career assists by a right wing – 640
- Most career assists by a European-born player – 640
- Most career playoff game-winning goals – 78
- Most career power-play goals by a right wing – 110
- Most career power-play goals by a European-born player – 110
- Most career shorthanded goals by a European-born player – 9
- Most career overtime goals – 9
- Most career game-tying goals – 10
- Most career shots on goal by a right wing – 2911
- Most career shots on goal by a European-born player – 2911
- Most career playoff goals by a right wing – 65
- Most career playoff goals by a European-born player – 65
- Most career playoff points by a right wing – 147
- Most career playoff points by a European-born player – 147
- Most career playoff shorthanded goals by a right wing – 2 (tied with Ed Olczyk)
- Most career playoff shorthanded goals by a European-born player – 2
- Most career playoff game-winning goals – 14
- Most career playoff overtime goals – 4
- Most career playoff shots on goal – 461
- Most career playoff power-play goals by a right wing – 19
- Most career playoff power-play goals by a European-born player – 19

=== New York Rangers records ===
- Most single-season goals (2005–06) – 54
- Most single-season points (2005–06) – 123
- Most single-season shots on goal (2005–06) – 368
- Most single-season game-winning goals (2005–06) – 9 (tied with Mark Messier in 1996–97 and Don Murdoch in 1980–81)
- Most single-season assists by a right wing (2005–06) – 69

== NHL scoring achievements ==
Jágr is second in NHL career regular season points and is sixth in career playoff points.

He is also amongst the career leaders in several other major NHL regular season statistical categories: goals (fourth), assists (fifth), games played (fourth), overtime goals (tied for second), game-winning goals (second), even-strength goals (third), power-play goals (tied for 11th), points per game (20th) and shots on goal (third).

Also amongst all-time leaders in NHL playoff statistical categories, Jágr ranks in the top 20 in points (sixth), goals (11th), assists (10th), overtime goals (tied for sixth), game-winning goals (10th), games played (tied for 15th), power-play goals (tied for 19th) and shots on goal (sixth).

Awards and achievements
Preceded by Jamie Heward	Pittsburgh Penguins first-round draft pick 1990	Succeeded by Markus Näslund
Preceded by Wayne Gretzky; Mario Lemieux	Winner of the Art Ross Trophy; 1995; 1998–2001	Succeeded by Mario Lemieux; Jarome Iginla
Preceded by Dominik Hašek	Winner of the Hart Memorial Trophy; 1999	Succeeded by Chris Pronger
Preceded by Roman Turek; Dominik Hašek; Jiří Dopita; Robert Lang	Czech Golden Hockey Stick; 1995, 1996; 1999, 2000; 2002; 2005–2008	Succeeded by Dominik Hašek; Jiří Dopita; Milan Hejduk; Patrik Eliáš
Preceded by Roman Šebrle	Czech Athlete of the Year; 2005	Succeeded by Kateřina Neumannová
Preceded by Martin St. Louis	Winner of the Lester B. Pearson Award; 2006	Succeeded by Sidney Crosby
Preceded by Devan Dubnyk	Winner of the Bill Masterton Memorial Trophy; 2016	Succeeded by Craig Anderson
Sporting positions
Preceded by Ron Francis	Pittsburgh Penguins captain 1998–2001	Succeeded by Mario Lemieux
Preceded by Mark Messier	New York Rangers captain 2006–2008	Succeeded by Chris Drury
Preceded by Alexander Svitov	Avangard Omsk captain 2009–2011	Succeeded by Alexei Kalyuzhny
Olympic Games
Preceded by Martina Sáblíková	Flag bearer for the Czech Republic; Vancouver 2010	Succeeded by Šárka Strachová
