= Finland at the 2014 Winter Olympics =

- IOC code: FIN
- NOC: Finnish Olympic Committee
- Website: sport.fi/olympiakomitea (in Finnish and Swedish)

in Sochi
- Competitors: 103 in 9 sports
- Flag bearers: Enni Rukajärvi (opening); Iivo Niskanen (closing)
- Officials: 123
- Medals Ranked 18th: Gold 1 Silver 3 Bronze 1 Total 5

Winter Olympics appearances (overview)
- 1924; 1928; 1932; 1936; 1948; 1952; 1956; 1960; 1964; 1968; 1972; 1976; 1980; 1984; 1988; 1992; 1994; 1998; 2002; 2006; 2010; 2014; 2018; 2022; 2026

Finland competed at the 2014 Winter Olympics in Sochi, Russia from 7 to 23 February 2014. The Finnish team consisted of 103 competitors who participated in alpine skiing, biathlon, cross-country skiing, freestyle skiing, ice hockey, ski jumping, snowboarding, and speed skating.

== Medalists ==
Medals by sport
| Sport | 1st place, gold medalist(s) | 2nd place, silver medalist(s) | 3rd place, bronze medalist(s) | Total |
| Cross-country skiing | 1 | 2 | 0 | 3 |
| Ice hockey | 0 | 0 | 1 | 1 |
| Snowboarding | 0 | 1 | 0 | 1 |
| Total | 1 | 3 | 1 | 5 |

| Medal | Name | Sport | Event | Date |
|---|---|---|---|---|
| Gold | Iivo Niskanen; Sami Jauhojärvi | Cross-country skiing | Men's team sprint | 19 February |
| Silver | Enni Rukajärvi | Snowboarding | Women's slopestyle | 9 February |
| Silver | Anne Kyllönen; Krista Lähteenmäki; Kerttu Niskanen; Aino-Kaisa Saarinen | Cross-country skiing | Women's relay | 15 February |
| Silver | Kerttu Niskanen; Aino-Kaisa Saarinen | Cross-country skiing | Women's team sprint | 19 February |
| Bronze | Finland men's national ice hockey team: Juhamatti Aaltonen; Aleksander Barkov; Mikael Granlund; Juuso Hietanen; Jarkko Immonen; Jussi Jokinen; Olli Jokinen; Leo Komarov; Petri Kontiola; Lauri Korpikoski; Lasse Kukkonen; Jori Lehterä; Kari Lehtonen; Sami Lepistö; Olli Määttä; Antti Niemi; Antti Pihlström; Tuukka Rask; Tuomo Ruutu; Sakari Salminen; Sami Salo; Teemu Selänne; Kimmo Timonen; Sami Vatanen; Ossi Väänänen | Ice hockey | Men's tournament | 22 February |

== Preparations by the Finnish Olympic Committee ==
=== Financial coaching support ===
The Finnish Olympic Committee launched its Sochi 2014 coaching program in June 2010, distributing financial support in winter sports to member federations and top level athletes directly.

Coaching support in euros per discipline by season
| | 2010–2011 | 2011–2012 | 2012–2013 | 2013–2014 | Total | 2010 total |
|---|---|---|---|---|---|---|
| Alpine skiing | 140,000 | 150,000 | 150,000 | 245,000 | 685,000 | 490,000 |
| Biathlon | 13,000 | 70,000 | 70,000 | 119,000 | 272,000 | 190,000 |
| Cross-country skiing^{x} | 180,000 | 210,000 | 200,000 | 275,000 | 865,000 | 667,000 |
| Curling | 0 | 30,000 | 30,000 | 25,000 | 85,000 | 55,000 |
| Figure skating | 80,000 | 80,000 | 80,000 | 120,000 | 360,000 | 161,000 |
| Freestyle skiing | 80,000 | 100,000 | 110,000 | 182,000 | 472,000 | 460,000 |
| Women's ice hockey | 180,000 | 200,000 | 190,000 | 190,000 | 760,000 | 640,000 |
| Nordic combined | 80,000 | 30,000 | 40,000 | 109,000 | 259,000 | 440,000 |
| Ski jumping | 80,000 | 80,000 | 80,000 | 130,000 | 370,000 | 440,000 |
| Snowboarding | 100,000 | 120,000 | 135,000 | 235,000 | 590,000 | 145,000 |
| Speed skating | 30,000 | 70,000 | 100,000 | 190,000 | 390,000 | 365,000 |
| Total | 963,000 | 1,140,000 | 1,185,000 | 1,820,000 | 5,108,000 | 4,053,000 |

^{x} including ski maintenance, which contributes to biathlon and Nordic combined as well

=== Ban on rainbow nails ===
In August 2013, Helsingin Sanomat quoted the President of the Board of the Finnish Olympic Committee Risto Nieminen, that it is forbidding its athletes the rainbow-patterned fingernails in the upcoming games, ruling it political abuse of the Olympic Charter. The issue was raised after high-jumper Emma Green Tregaro displayed her rainbow nails and the Finnish Minister of Culture and Sport Paavo Arhinmäki waved the rainbow flag in the Moscow 2013 World Championships in Athletics in support of LGBT rights in Russia. Arhinmäki responded, that the Olympic movement should defend, not limit, the freedom of speech, and the Minister for European Affairs and Foreign Trade of Finland Alexander Stubb commented that the issue is about human rights, not politics, both bringing up the 1968 Olympics Black Power salute as one of the finest moments in Olympic history. The Committee followed up, that they were simply quoting the Charter, which bans political abuse, and themselves couldn't allow or disallow the nails.

=== Athlete prize bonuses ===
The Finnish Olympic Committee offers prize bonuses for medalists: €30,000 for gold, €15,000 for silver and €10,000 for bronze, where in team events the price has to be divided between athletes, with a cap of €60,000 per athlete. The exception is for an ice hockey medal where the bonus is €60,000 for gold, €40,000 for silver and €30,000 for bronze.

=== Budget ===
The cost of the games for the Finnish Olympic Committee is 1.2 million euros. About half of it, food and accommodation expenses, will be subsidised by the International Olympic Committee.

== Finnish Olympic team ==
The Finnish Olympic team in Sochi consists of 226 people, of which 16 are the team's general leadership, 103 athletes, and 107 other staff members, such as coaches, masseurs, physiotherapists and physicians.

Competitors from Finland per sport excluding reserves
| Sport | Men | Women | Total | 2010 total | |
|---|---|---|---|---|---|
| Alpine skiing | 3 | 1 | 4 | Steady | 4 |
| Biathlon | 2 | 2 | 4 | Steady | 4 |
| Cross-country skiing | 8 | 7 | 15 | ▼ | 17 |
| Figure skating | 0 | 0 | 0 | ▼ | 3 |
| Freestyle skiing | 10 | 0 | 10 | ▲ | 4 |
| Ice hockey | 25 | 21 | 46 | ▲ | 41 |
| Nordic combined | 4 | —N/a | 4 | Steady | 4 |
| Ski jumping | 5 | 1 | 6 | ▲ | 5 |
| Snowboarding | 8 | 3 | 11 | ▲ | 5 |
| Speed skating | 3 | 0 | 3 | ▼ | 4 |
| Total | 68 | 35 | 103 | ▲ | 91 |

=== Athlete selection method ===
Athletes to the Olympic team are picked by the Elite Sports Unit of the Finnish Olympic Committee based on presentations by the national sports federations. The Unit is led by Mika Kojonkoski. It revised the selection from earlier games by creating a continuous method, where athletes are added as they display to fulfill requirements. The athletes are required to

1. have a realistic chance to finish in the top 16 in an individuals' event or in the top 8 in a team event, or
2. be in the career's development phase with a prospect to become a major international athlete

based on their results in the current and previous season. The Committee considered the bar raised from the preceding games.

Schedule for selection publication:

1. 30 October 2013: first 10 athletes nominated in alpine skiing, biathlon, freestyle skiing, snowboarding and speed skating
2. 16 December 2013: 14 athletes nominated in cross-country skiing, Nordic combined, ski jumping and snowboarding
3. 18 December 2013: women's ice hockey team of 21 players nominated
4. 7 January 2014: men's ice hockey team of 25 players nominated
5. 13 January 2014: 8 athletes nominated in cross-country skiing and ski jumping
6. 21 January 2014: 22 athletes nominated in biathlon, freestyle skiing, snowboarding, ski jumping and Nordic combined
7. 27 January 2014: final 7 athletes nominated in alpine skiing, freestyle skiing, snowboarding and speed skating

=== Appearance records ===
For Janne Ahonen and Teemu Selänne, 2014 will be their sixth Olympic games, tying them for the most Olympic appearances for Finns with Marja-Liisa Kirvesniemi, Harri Kirvesniemi and Raimo Helminen. Selänne will be alongside Helminen the only ice hockey player with six appearances, Selänne already being the all-time Olympic point-leader.

=== Sports without participation by Finland ===
Finland will not compete in bobsleigh, curling, figure skating, luge, short track speed skating and skeleton. For figure skating Finland has the 2nd stand-by entry for ladies' singles, 4th for ice dancing and 7th for men's singles. The entries may not be transferred after 27 January 2014. Finland failed to qualify the curling team at the Olympic qualification event.

== Medal count predictions and expectations ==
The Finnish Olympic Committee set no official medal target.

An article published by International Associations of Sports Economists / North American Association of Sports Economists in 2011, using such parameters as population, political regime, snow coverage and winter sports facilities, predicted Finland to win 5 medals.

In a poll ordered by MTV3, a majority from a sample of 1,700 Finns in December 2013 expected Finland to win 2–4 medals, having best chances in snowboarding.

Infostrada Sports predicts that Finland will win one gold and five bronzes, broken down:

- in cross-country skiing: gold in women's team sprint and bronze in women's 4 × 5 kilometre relay
- in biathlon: bronze for Kaisa Mäkäräinen in women's pursuit and sprint
- in ice hockey: bronze in men's and women's tournament

Associated Press projected Finland to win two silvers and three bronzes, broken down:

- in biathlon: silver for Kaisa Mäkäräinen in women's pursuit and mass start
- in cross-country skiing: bronze in women's team sprint and 4 × 5 kilometre relay
- in ice hockey: bronze in women's tournament

Ilta-Sanomat expected certain Finnish medals as a top two finish in women's team sprint, a silver in women's 4 × 5 kilometre relay, a medal in women's ice hockey and possibly multiple medals for Kaisa Mäkäräinen.

PricewaterhouseCoopers, using regression analysis with such variables as gross domestic product and climate to estimate medal shares, predicted Finland to win 6 medals.

== Alpine skiing ==
Finland has qualified a total quota of four athletes by the International Ski Federation (FIS), based on qualification points awarded in races within the FIS Calendar during the period of July 2012–19 January 2014. National quotas per each Olympic event were allocated according to points awarded in these competitions. Andreas Romar was initially selected to the Finnish Olympic team, but declared absent on January 10, 2014, following his heel fracture.

| Athlete | Event | Run 1 | | Run 2 | | Total | |
| Athlete | Event | Time | Rank | Time | Rank | Time | Rank |
|---|---|---|---|---|---|---|---|
| Santeri Paloniemi | Men's slalom | 49.57 | 31 | DNF | | | |
| Marcus Sandell | Men's giant slalom | DNF | | | | | |
| Samu Torsti | Men's giant slalom | 1:23.59 | 25 | 1:24.38 | =17 | 2:47.97 | 21 |
| Tanja Poutiainen | Women's giant slalom | 1:20.12 | 12 | 1:19.76 | 21 | 2:39.88 | =14 |
| Tanja Poutiainen | Women's slalom | 54.94 | 13 | 53.07 | 16 | 1:48.01 | 12 |

== Biathlon ==
Finland has qualified a total quota of four athletes by the International Biathlon Union (IBU), based on Nation Cup points won in 2012 and 2013 Biathlon World Championships during the qualification period of 16 November 2012 – 19 January 2014. There were no event-specific requirements.

| Athlete | Event | Time | Misses | Rank |
|---|---|---|---|---|
| Jarkko Kauppinen | Men's sprint | 27:57.8 | 3 (2+1) | 78 |
| Jarkko Kauppinen | Men's individual | DNF | 5 (3+2) | DNF |
| Ahti Toivanen | Men's sprint | 26:58.6 | 2 (1+1) | 62 |
| Ahti Toivanen | Men's individual | 55:55.4 | 3 (1+1+1) | 56 |
| Mari Laukkanen | Women's sprint | 22:37.3 | 2 (0+2) | 36 |
| Mari Laukkanen | Women's pursuit | DNS | | |
| Mari Laukkanen | Women's individual | DNS | | |
| Kaisa Mäkäräinen | Women's sprint | 22:18.4 | 2 (0+2) | 30 |
| Kaisa Mäkäräinen | Women's pursuit | 31:02.3 | 3 (0+0+2+1) | 16 |
| Kaisa Mäkäräinen | Women's individual | 46:02.5 | 3 (0+1+0+2) | 9 |
| Kaisa Mäkäräinen | Women's mass start | 36:27.1 | 2 (0+0+1+1) | 6 |

== Cross-country skiing ==
Finland has awarded a total quota of seventeen athletes by International Ski Federation (FIS), based on qualification points awarded in races within the FIS Calendar during the period of July 2012–19 January 2014. National quotas per each Olympic event were allocated according to points awarded in these competitions.

Distance
Men

| Athlete | Event | Classical | | Freestyle | | Final | | |
| Athlete | Event | Time | Rank | Time | Rank | Time | Deficit | Rank |
|---|---|---|---|---|---|---|---|---|
| Matti Heikkinen | 15 km classical | —N/a | | | | 40:17.8 | +1:48.1 | 20 |
| Matti Heikkinen | 30 km skiathlon | 36:40.3 | 23 | 34:39.2 | 48 | 1:11:52.6 | +3:37.2 | 40 |
| Matti Heikkinen | 50 km freestyle | —N/a | | | | 1:47:35.0 | +39.8 | 15 |
| Sami Jauhojärvi | 15 km classical | —N/a | | | | 40:14.4 | +1:44.7 | 17 |
| Sami Jauhojärvi | 30 km skiathlon | 36:54.3 | 31 | 33:46.8 | 36 | 1:11:12.0 | +2:56.6 | 33 |
| Martti Jylhä | 50 km freestyle | —N/a | | | | DNF | | |
| Lari Lehtonen | 30 km skiathlon | 37:30.8 | 42 | 33:31.3 | 33 | 1:11:34.1 | +3:18.7 | 38 |
| Lari Lehtonen | 50 km freestyle | —N/a | | | | 1:47:48.7 | +53.5 | 23 |
| Iivo Niskanen | 15 km classical | —N/a | | | | 39:08.7 | +39.0 | 4 |
| Iivo Niskanen | 30 km skiathlon | 36:42.3 | 26 | 33:07.8 | 29 | 1:10:22.0 | +2:06.6 | 26 |
| Iivo Niskanen | 50 km freestyle | —N/a | | | | 1:47:27.5 | +32.3 | 10 |
| Ville Nousiainen | 15 km classical | —N/a | | | | 40:52.6 | +2:22.9 | 28 |
| Matti Heikkinen; Sami Jauhojärvi; Lari Lehtonen; Iivo Niskanen | 4×10 km relay | —N/a | | | | 1:30:28.4 | +1:46.4 | 6 |

Women

| Athlete | Event | Classical | | Freestyle | | Final | | |
| Athlete | Event | Time | Rank | Time | Rank | Time | Deficit | Rank |
|---|---|---|---|---|---|---|---|---|
| Anne Kyllönen | 10 km classical | —N/a | | | | 29:52.8 | +1:35.0 | 13 |
| Anne Kyllönen | 15 km skiathlon | 19:30.3 | 11 | 21:12.9 | 47 | 41:18.9 | +2:45.3 | 33 |
| Krista Lähteenmäki | 10 km classical | —N/a | | | | 29:36.0 | +1:18.2 | 10 |
| Krista Lähteenmäki | 15 km skiathlon | 19:27.6 | 10 | 20:07.7 | 24 | 40:09.9 | +1:36.3 | 13 |
| Krista Lähteenmäki | 30 km freestyle | —N/a | | | | 1:13:37.6 | +2:32.4 | 18 |
| Kerttu Niskanen | 10 km classical | —N/a | | | | 29:16.7 | +58.9 | 8 |
| Kerttu Niskanen | 15 km skiathlon | 19:17.4 | 7 | 19:45.9 | 14 | 39:35.3 | +1:01.7 | 7 |
| Kerttu Niskanen | 30 km freestyle | —N/a | | | | 1:12:26.9 | +1:21.7 | 4 |
| Riitta-Liisa Roponen | 30 km freestyle | —N/a | | | | 1:14:51.6 | +3:46.4 | 26 |
| Aino-Kaisa Saarinen | 10 km classical | —N/a | | | | 28:48.1 | +30.3 | 4 |
| Aino-Kaisa Saarinen | 15 km skiathlon | 19:12.4 | 5 | 19:02.3 | 5 | 38:48.9 | +15.3 | 5 |
| Aino-Kaisa Saarinen | 30 km freestyle | —N/a | | | | 1:13:52.5 | +2:47.3 | 21 |
| Anne Kyllönen; Krista Lähteenmäki; Kerttu Niskanen; Aino-Kaisa Saarinen | 4×5 km relay | —N/a | | | | 53:03.2 | +0.5 | 2nd place, silver medalist(s) |

Sprint
Men

| Athlete | Event | Qualification | | Quarterfinal | | Semifinal | | Final | |
| Athlete | Event | Time | Rank | Time | Rank | Time | Rank | Time | Rank |
|---|---|---|---|---|---|---|---|---|---|
| Martti Jylhä | Sprint | 3:34.49 | 12 Q | 3:37.98 | 5 | did not advance | | | |
| Juho Mikkonen | Sprint | 3:40.72 | 43 | did not advance | | | | | |
| Ville Nousiainen | Sprint | 3:37.52 | 25 Q | 3:40.84 | 5 | did not advance | | | |
| Anssi Pentsinen | Sprint | 3:38.66 | 34 | did not advance | | | | | |
| Sami Jauhojärvi; Iivo Niskanen | Team sprint | —N/a | | | | 23:26.13 | 1 Q | 23:14.89 | 1st place, gold medalist(s) |

Women

| Athlete | Event | Qualification | | Quarterfinal | | Semifinal | | Final | |
| Athlete | Event | Time | Rank | Time | Rank | Time | Rank | Time | Rank |
|---|---|---|---|---|---|---|---|---|---|
| Anne Kyllönen | Sprint | 2:35.57 | 11 Q | 2:37.07 | 4 | did not advance | | | |
| Mona-Liisa Malvalehto | Sprint | 2:40.08 | 28 Q | 2:41.20 | 6 | did not advance | | | |
| Mari Laukkanen | Sprint | 2:39.06 | 24 Q | 2:37.48 | 3 | did not advance | | | |
| Riikka Sarasoja-Lilja | Sprint | 2:41.55 | 37 | did not advance | | | | | |
| Kerttu Niskanen; Aino-Kaisa Saarinen | Team sprint | —N/a | | | | 16:42.15 | 1 Q | 16:13.14 | 2nd place, silver medalist(s) |

== Freestyle skiing ==
Finland has awarded a total quota of 9 athletes (all in men's events) by the International Ski Federation (FIS), based on competitions in the International FIS Calendar during the qualification period of July 2012–19 January 2014. National quotas per each Olympic event were allocated according to points awarded in these competitions. On January 31, 2014, a fourth slopestyle spot was allocated to the team after a scheduling and calculation adjustment.

Halfpipe

| Athlete | Event | Qualification | | | | Final | | | |
| Athlete | Event | Run 1 | Run 2 | Best | Rank | Run 1 | Run 2 | Best | Rank |
|---|---|---|---|---|---|---|---|---|---|
| Antti-Jussi Kemppainen | Men's halfpipe | 79.40 | 60.40 | 79.40 | 9 Q | 74.40 | 78.20 | 78.20 | 8 |

Moguls

| Athlete | Event | Qualification | | | | | | | | Final | | | | | | | | | | | |
| Athlete | Event | Run 1 | | | | Run 2 | | | | Run 1 | | | | Run 2 | | | | Run 3 | | | |
| Athlete | Event | Time | Points | Total | Rank | Time | Points | Total | Rank | Time | Points | Total | Rank | Time | Points | Total | Rank | Time | Points | Total | Rank |
|---|---|---|---|---|---|---|---|---|---|---|---|---|---|---|---|---|---|---|---|---|---|
| Arttu Kiramo | Men's moguls | 27.18 | 3.91 | 9.09 | 26 | 26.17 | 13.07 | 18.73 | 12 | Did not advance | | | | | | | | | | | |
| Ville Miettunen | Men's moguls | DNF | | | | DNS | | | | Did not advance | | | | | | | | | | | |
| Jussi Penttala | Men's moguls | 24.86 | 11.71 | 17.99 | 23 | DNF | | | | Did not advance | | | | | | | | | | | |
| Jimi Salonen | Men's moguls | 24.53 | 13.21 | 19.64 | 20 | 25.26 | 15.76 | 21.85 | 3 Q | 24.77 | 14.43 | 20.75 | 18 | did not advance | | | | | | | |

Ski cross

| Athlete | Event | Seeding | | Round of 16 | Quarterfinal | Semifinal | Final | |
| Athlete | Event | Time | Rank | Position | Position | Position | Position | Rank |
|---|---|---|---|---|---|---|---|---|
| Jouni Pellinen | Men's ski cross | 1:17.41 | 9 | 1 Q | 4 | did not advance | | 13 |

Qualification legend: FA – Qualify to medal round; FB – Qualify to consolation round

Slopestyle

| Athlete | Event | Qualification | | | | Final | | | |
| Athlete | Event | Run 1 | Run 2 | Best | Rank | Run 1 | Run 2 | Best | Rank |
|---|---|---|---|---|---|---|---|---|---|
| Lauri Kivari | Men's slopestyle | 45.8 | 2.8 | 45.8 | 29 | did not advance | | | |
| Antti Ollila | Men's slopestyle | 81.4 | 31.6 | 81.4 | 13 | did not advance | | | |
| Aleksi Patja | Men's slopestyle | 10.8 | 12.0 | 12.0 | 31 | did not Advance | | | |
| Otso Räisänen | Men's slopestyle | 59.6 | 56.2 | 59.6 | 25 | did not advance | | | |

== Ice hockey ==
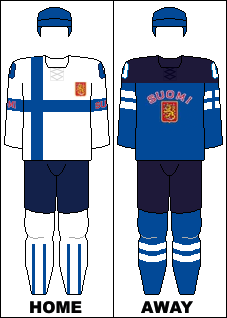
Finland's ice hockey jerseys at the 2014 Olympics, designed by Nike

Finland is defending the men's and women's bronze medals won in the previous games.

=== Men's tournament ===
Governing body of the Olympic ice hockey is the International Ice Hockey Federation (IIHF). Top 9 teams in the men's IIHF World Ranking of 2012 qualified directly to the games, Finland ranking 2nd.

Roster

The following players are in the reserve, in case of injuries before the games begin:

- Goalkeepers: Antti Raanta, Pekka Rinne
- Defenders: Topi Jaakola, Petteri Nummelin, Jere Karalahti, Rasmus Ristolainen, Tuukka Mäntylä
- Forwards: Sean Bergenheim, Teemu Hartikainen, Jarkko Immonen

Saku Koivu refused a spot in the team due to a concussion suffered in November 2013.

The Finnish roster for the men's ice hockey tournament of the 2014 Winter Olympics was published on 7 January 2014. The players were picked by the head coach Erkka Westerlund.

| No. | Pos. | Name | Height | Weight | Birthdate | Birthplace | 2013–14 team |
|---|---|---|---|---|---|---|---|
| 3 | D | Olli Määttä | 187 cm (6 ft 2 in) | 89 kg (196 lb) | 22 August 1994 | Jyväskylä | (United States) Pittsburgh Penguins (NHL) |
| 4 | D | Ossi Väänänen | 191 cm (6 ft 3 in) | 99 kg (218 lb) | 18 August 1980 | Vantaa | (Finland) Jokerit (Liiga) |
| 5 | D | Lasse Kukkonen | 183 cm (6 ft 0 in) | 85 kg (187 lb) | 18 September 1981 | Oulu | (Finland) Oulun Kärpät (Liiga) |
| 6 | D | Sami Salo | 190 cm (6 ft 3 in) | 93 kg (205 lb) | 2 September 1974 | Turku | (United States) Tampa Bay Lightning (NHL) |
| 8 | F | Teemu Selänne – C | 182 cm (6 ft 0 in) | 91 kg (201 lb) | 3 July 1970 | Helsinki | (United States) Anaheim Ducks (NHL) |
| 12 | F | Olli Jokinen | 187 cm (6 ft 2 in) | 91 kg (201 lb) | 5 December 1978 | Kuopio | (Canada) Winnipeg Jets (NHL) |
| 15 | F | Tuomo Ruutu | 182 cm (6 ft 0 in) | 89 kg (196 lb) | 16 February 1983 | Vantaa | (United States) Carolina Hurricanes (NHL) |
| 16 | F | Aleksander Barkov | 190 cm (6 ft 3 in) | 91 kg (201 lb) | 2 September 1995 | Tampere | (United States) Florida Panthers (NHL) |
| 18 | D | Sami Lepistö | 186 cm (6 ft 1 in) | 85 kg (187 lb) | 17 October 1984 | Espoo | (Russia) Avtomobilist Yekaterinburg (KHL) |
| 21 | F | Jori Lehterä | 187 cm (6 ft 2 in) | 97 kg (214 lb) | 23 December 1987 | Helsinki | (Russia) HC Sibir Novosibirsk (KHL) |
| 23 | F | Sakari Salminen | 177 cm (5 ft 10 in) | 75 kg (165 lb) | 31 May 1988 | Pori | (Russia) Torpedo Nizhny Novgorod (KHL) |
| 26 | F | Jarkko Immonen | 182 cm (6 ft 0 in) | 90 kg (200 lb) | 19 April 1982 | Rantasalmi | (Russia) Torpedo Nizhny Novgorod (KHL) |
| 27 | F | Petri Kontiola | 182 cm (6 ft 0 in) | 92 kg (203 lb) | 4 October 1984 | Seinäjoki | (Russia) Traktor Chelyabinsk (KHL) |
| 28 | F | Lauri Korpikoski | 185 cm (6 ft 1 in) | 88 kg (194 lb) | 28 July 1986 | Turku | (United States) Phoenix Coyotes (NHL) |
| 31 | G | Antti Niemi | 187 cm (6 ft 2 in) | 91 kg (201 lb) | 29 August 1983 | Vantaa | (United States) San Jose Sharks (NHL) |
| 32 | G | Kari Lehtonen | 193 cm (6 ft 4 in) | 91 kg (201 lb) | 16 November 1983 | Helsinki | (United States) Dallas Stars (NHL) |
| 36 | F | Jussi Jokinen | 181 cm (5 ft 11 in) | 86 kg (190 lb) | 1 April 1983 | Kalajoki | (United States) Pittsburgh Penguins (NHL) |
| 38 | D | Juuso Hietanen | 180 cm (5 ft 11 in) | 85 kg (187 lb) | 14 June 1985 | Hämeenlinna | (Russia) Torpedo Nizhny Novgorod (KHL) |
| 40 | G | Tuukka Rask | 187 cm (6 ft 2 in) | 90 kg (200 lb) | 10 March 1987 | Savonlinna | (United States) Boston Bruins (NHL) |
| 41 | F | Antti Pihlström | 180 cm (5 ft 11 in) | 82 kg (181 lb) | 22 October 1984 | Vantaa | (Russia) Salavat Yulaev Ufa (KHL) |
| 44 | D | Kimmo Timonen – A | 177 cm (5 ft 10 in) | 84 kg (185 lb) | 18 March 1975 | Kuopio | (United States) Philadelphia Flyers (NHL) |
| 45 | D | Sami Vatanen | 177 cm (5 ft 10 in) | 79 kg (174 lb) | 3 June 1991 | Jyväskylä | (United States) Anaheim Ducks (NHL) |
| 50 | F | Juhamatti Aaltonen | 184 cm (6 ft 0 in) | 85 kg (187 lb) | 4 June 1985 | Ii | (Finland) Oulun Kärpät (Liiga) |
| 64 | F | Mikael Granlund | 179 cm (5 ft 10 in) | 83 kg (183 lb) | 26 February 1992 | Oulu | (United States) Minnesota Wild (NHL) |
| 71 | F | Leo Komarov – A | 180 cm (5 ft 11 in) | 90 kg (200 lb) | 23 January 1987 | Narva, Soviet Union | (Russia) HC Dynamo Moscow (KHL) |

Forwards Mikko Koivu and Valtteri Filppula were also selected but were unable to participate due to injury. They were replaced by Jarkko Immonen and Sakari Salminen respectively.

Group standings

Finland will play in Group B. All times are local (UTC+4).

| Team | Pld | W | OTW | OTL | L | GF | GA | GD | Pts | Qualification |
|---|---|---|---|---|---|---|---|---|---|---|
| Canada | 3 | 2 | 1 | 0 | 0 | 11 | 2 | +9 | 8 | Quarterfinals |
| Finland | 3 | 2 | 0 | 1 | 0 | 15 | 7 | +8 | 7 | Quarterfinals |
| Austria | 3 | 1 | 0 | 0 | 2 | 7 | 15 | −8 | 3 | |
| Norway | 3 | 0 | 0 | 0 | 3 | 3 | 12 | −9 | 0 | |

Source: IIHF

| 13 February 2014; 12:00 | Finland | 8–4 (4–2, 2–0, 2–2) | Austria | Bolshoy Ice Dome, Sochi; Attendance: 5,664 |

Game reference

Tuukka Rask
Goalies
Bernhard Starkbaum
Referees:
(Germany) Daniel Piechaczek
(United States) Ian Walsh
Linesmen:
(United States) Tommy George
(Canada) Brad Kovachik

| | 0–1 | 0:36 – M. Grabner (M. Raffl) |
| M. Granlund (T. Selänne, S. Vatanen) – 5:15 | 1–1 |
| | 1–2 | 9:19 – T. Hundertpfund (T. Vanek, O. Setzinger) |
| S. Lepistö (J. Jokinen, T. Ruutu) – 11:23 | 2–2 |
| O. Määttä (O. Jokinen) – 19:25 | 3–2 |
| J. Immonen (J. Lehterä, O. Väänänen) – 19:33 | 4–2 |
| J. Jokinen (P. Kontiola) – 21:43 | 5–2 |
| P. Kontiola (M. Granlund) – 32:10 | 6–2 |
| | 6–3 | 41:29 – M. Grabner (M. Raffl, B. Lebler) |
| J. Immonen (A. Barkov, S. Vatanen) (PP) – 51:25 | 7–3 |
| | 7–4 | 54:22 – M. Grabner (M. Trattnig, B. Lebler) |
| M. Granlund (K. Timonen, S. Vatanen) (PP) – 58:25 | 8–4 |

4 min
Penalties
10 min
52
Shots
20

| 14 February 2014; 21:00 | Norway | 1–6 (0–3, 0–2, 1–1) | Finland | Shayba Arena, Sochi; Attendance: 3,018 |

Game reference

Lars Haugen (out 20:00)
Lars Volden (in 20:00)
Goalies
Kari Lehtonen
Referees:
(Germany) Lars Brüggemann
(Canada) Kelly Sutherland
Linesmen:
(Canada) Derek Amell
(Canada) Chris Carlson

| | 0–1 | 5:46 – T. Selänne (S. Vatanen, K. Lehtonen) |
| | 0–2 | 6:51 – L. Korpikoski (O. Jokinen, O. Määttä) |
| | 0–3 | 17:21 – J. Lehterä |
| | 0–4 | 28:03 – L. Korpikoski (O. Määttä, T. Ruutu) |
| | 0–5 | 31:26 – O. Jokinen (S. Salo, T. Ruutu) |
| P. Skrøder (M. Olimb, J. Holøs) (PP2) – 41:01 | 1–5 |
| | 1–6 | 57:41 – O. Määttä (P. Kontiola, K. Lehtonen) |

6 min
Penalties
6 min
21
Shots
39

| 16 February 2014; 21:00 | Finland | 1–2 (OT) (0–1, 1–0, 0–0, 0–1) | Canada | Bolshoy Ice Dome, Sochi; Attendance: 11,263 |

Game reference

Tuukka Rask
Goalies
Carey Price
Referees:
(Czech Republic) Antonín Jeřábek
(Canada) Kevin Pollock
Linesmen:
(Belarus) Ivan Dedioulia
(Canada) Brad Kovachik

| | 0–1 | 13:44 – D. Doughty (S. Weber, S. Crosby) (PP) |
| T. Ruutu (J. Jokinen, O. Väänänen) – 38:00 | 1–1 |
| | 1–2 | 62:32 – D. Doughty (J. Carter) |

2 min
Penalties
2 min
15
Shots
27

Quarterfinal

| 19 February 2014; 16:30 | Finland | 3–1 (2–1, 1–0, 0–0) | Russia | Bolshoy Ice Dome, Sochi; Attendance: 11,654 |

Game reference

Tuukka Rask
Goalies
Semyon Varlamov (out 26:42)
Sergei Bobrovsky (in 26:42)
Referees:
(Canada) Kelly Sutherland
(Sweden) Marcus Vinnerborg
Linesmen:
(Canada) Greg Devorski
(Canada) Jesse Wilmot

| | 0–1 | 7:51 – I. Kovalchuk (P. Datsyuk) (PP) |
| J. Aaltonen (P. Kontiola) – 9:18 | 1–1 |
| T. Selänne (M. Granlund) – 17:38 | 2–1 |
| M. Granlund (T. Selänne, K. Timonen) (PP) – 25:37 | 3–1 |

6 min
Penalties
8 min
22
Shots
38

Semifinal

| 21 February 2014; 16:00 | Sweden | 2–1 (0–0, 2–1, 0–0) | Finland | Bolshoy Ice Dome, Sochi; Attendance: 9,476 |

Game reference

Henrik Lundqvist
Goalies
Kari Lehtonen
Referees:
(Russia) Konstantin Olenin
(United States) Tim Peel
Linesmen:
(Canada) Derek Amell
(Canada) Chris Carlson

| | 0–1 | 26:17 – O. Jokinen (S. Vatanen) |
| L. Eriksson (Jo. Ericsson, N. Bäckström) – 31:39 | 1–1 |
| E. Karlsson (A. Steen, D. Sedin) (PP) – 36:26 | 2–1 |

10 min
Penalties
4 min
25
Shots
26

Bronze medal game

| 22 February 2014; 19:00 | United States | 0–5 (0–0, 0–2, 0–3) | Finland (bronze) | Bolshoy Ice Dome, Sochi; Attendance: 9,052 |

Game reference

Jonathan Quick
Goalies
Tuukka Rask
Referees:
(Russia) Konstantin Olenin
(United States) Tim Peel
Linesmen:
(Canada) Chris Carlson
(Belarus) Ivan Dedioulia

| 0–1 | 21:27 – T. Selänne (M. Granlund, L. Korpikoski) |
| 0–2 | 21:38 – J. Jokinen (J. Lehterä, P. Kontiola) |
| 0–3 | 46:10 – J. Hietanen (T. Ruutu, S. Lepistö) |
| 0–4 | 49:06 – T. Selänne (M. Granlund, L. Korpikoski) (PP) |
| 0–5 | 53:09 – O. Määttä (J. Lehterä, J. Jokinen) (PP) |

12 min
Penalties
4 min
27
Shots
29

Teemu Selänne, at age 43 years and 234 days, became the oldest ice hockey player to win an Olympic medal. He also holds the Olympic record for total ice hockey points, upping it to 43. He also shares the record for most appearances in ice hockey at the Olympics, appearing in 6.

=== Women's tournament ===
Top 6 teams in the women's IIHF World Ranking of 2012 qualified directly to the games, Finland ranking 3rd.

Roster

The Finnish roster for the women's ice hockey tournament of the 2014 Winter Olympics was published on 18 December 2013. The players were picked by the head coach Mika Pieniniemi.

| No. | Pos. | Name | Height | Weight | Birthdate | Birthplace | 2013–14 team |
|---|---|---|---|---|---|---|---|
| 1 | G | Eveliina Suonpää | 173 cm (5 ft 8 in) | 63 kg (139 lb) | 12 April 1995 | Kiukainen | (Finland) Team Oriflame Kuortane (SM-sarja) |
| 3 | D | Emma Terho | 159 cm (5 ft 3 in) | 60 kg (130 lb) | 17 December 1981 | Washington, D.C., USA | (Finland) Espoo Blues (SM-sarja) |
| 4 | D | Rosa Lindstedt | 186 cm (6 ft 1 in) | 80 kg (180 lb) | 24 January 1988 | Ylöjärvi | (Finland) JYP Jyväskylä (SM-sarja) |
| 5 | D | Anna Kilponen | 169 cm (5 ft 7 in) | 74 kg (163 lb) | 16 May 1995 | Orivesi | (Finland) Team Oriflame Kuortane (SM-sarja) |
| 6 | D | Jenni Hiirikoski – C | 162 cm (5 ft 4 in) | 60 kg (130 lb) | 30 March 1987 | Lempäälä | (Finland) JYP Jyväskylä (SM-sarja) |
| 7 | D | Mira Jalosuo | 184 cm (6 ft 0 in) | 80 kg (180 lb) | 3 February 1989 | Lieksa | (Russia) SKIF Nizhny Novgorod (RWHL) |
| 9 | F | Venla Hovi | 169 cm (5 ft 7 in) | 63 kg (139 lb) | 28 October 1987 | Tampere | (Finland) KalPa Kuopio (SM-sarja) |
| 10 | F | Linda Välimäki | 166 cm (5 ft 5 in) | 70 kg (150 lb) | 31 May 1990 | Ylöjärvi | (Finland) Espoo Blues (SM-sarja) |
| 11 | F | Anniina Rajahuhta | 164 cm (5 ft 5 in) | 70 kg (150 lb) | 8 March 1989 | Helsinki | (Finland) Espoo Blues (SM-sarja) |
| 13 | F | Riikka Välilä | 160 cm (5 ft 3 in) | 63 kg (139 lb) | 12 June 1973 | Jyväskylä | (Finland) JYP Jyväskylä (SM-sarja) |
| 15 | F | Minttu Tuominen | 165 cm (5 ft 5 in) | 70 kg (150 lb) | 26 June 1990 | Helsinki | (Finland) Espoo Blues (SM-sarja) |
| 16 | F | Vilma Tanskanen | 175 cm (5 ft 9 in) | 66 kg (146 lb) | 14 April 1995 | Helsinki | (Finland) Team Oriflame Kuortane (SM-sarja) |
| 18 | G | Meeri Räisänen | 170 cm (5 ft 7 in) | 62 kg (137 lb) | 2 December 1989 | Tampere | (Finland) JYP Jyväskylä (SM-sarja) |
| 20 | D | Saija Tarkki | 172 cm (5 ft 8 in) | 60 kg (130 lb) | 29 December 1982 | Oulu | (Finland) Oulun Kärpät (SM-sarja) |
| 21 | F | Michelle Karvinen | 166 cm (5 ft 5 in) | 69 kg (152 lb) | 27 March 1990 | Rødovre, Denmark | (United States) University of North Dakota (NCAA) |
| 23 | F | Nina Tikkinen | 170 cm (5 ft 7 in) | 66 kg (146 lb) | 6 February 1987 | Salo | (Finland) Oulun Kärpät (SM-sarja) |
| 29 | F | Karoliina Rantamäki | 163 cm (5 ft 4 in) | 65 kg (143 lb) | 23 February 1978 | Vantaa | (Russia) SKIF Nizhny Novgorod (RWHL) |
| 41 | G | Noora Räty | 165 cm (5 ft 5 in) | 70 kg (150 lb) | 29 May 1989 | Espoo | (Finland) Ilves Tampere (SM-sarja) |
| 77 | F | Susanna Tapani | 177 cm (5 ft 10 in) | 64 kg (141 lb) | 2 March 1993 | Laitila | (United States) University of North Dakota (NCAA) |
| 80 | D | Tea Villilä | 168 cm (5 ft 6 in) | 63 kg (139 lb) | 16 April 1991 | Hyvinkää | (United States) Minnesota Duluth Bulldogs (NCAA) |
| 96 | F | Emma Nuutinen | 176 cm (5 ft 9 in) | 73 kg (161 lb) | 7 December 1996 | Helsinki | (Finland) Espoo Blues (SM-sarja) |

Group standings

Finland will play in Group A. All times are local (UTC+4).

| Team | Pld | W | OTW | OTL | L | GF | GA | GD | Pts | Qualification |
|---|---|---|---|---|---|---|---|---|---|---|
| Canada | 3 | 3 | 0 | 0 | 0 | 11 | 2 | +9 | 9 | Semifinals |
| United States | 3 | 2 | 0 | 0 | 1 | 14 | 4 | +10 | 6 | Semifinals |
| Finland | 3 | 0 | 1 | 0 | 2 | 5 | 9 | −4 | 2 | Quarterfinals |
| Switzerland | 3 | 0 | 0 | 1 | 2 | 3 | 18 | −15 | 1 | Quarterfinals |

Source: IIHF

| 8 February 2014; 12:00 | United States | 3–1 (1–0, 2–0, 0–1) | Finland | Shayba Arena, Sochi; Attendance: 4,135 |

Game reference

Jessie Vetter
Goalies
Noora Räty
Referee:
(Germany) Nicole Hertrich
Linesmen:
(Sweden) Therese Bjorkman
(Canada) Stephanie Gagnon

| H. Knight – 00:53 | 1–0 |
| K. Stack (H. Knight, M. Bozek) – 27:42 | 2–0 |
| A. Carpenter (A. Schleper) (PP) – 35:59 | 3–0 |
| | 3–1 | 55:22 – S. Tapani (M. Karvinen) (PP) |

4 min
Penalties
8 min
43
Shots
15

| 10 February 2014; 19:00 | Finland | 0–3 (0–0, 0–0, 0–3) | Canada | Shayba Arena, Sochi; Attendance: 4,837 |

Game reference

Noora Räty
Goalies
Shannon Szabados
Referee:
(United Kingdom) Joy Tottman
Linesmen:
(Sweden) Therese Bjorkman
(United States) Laura Johnson

| 0–1 | 49:27 – M. Agosta-Marciano (PP) |
| 0–2 | 52:24 – J. Hefford |
| 0–3 | 56:36 – R. Johnston (J. Hefford, M-P. Poulin) |

10 min
Penalties
12 min
14
Shots
42

| 12 February 2014; 12:00 | Switzerland | 3–4 OT (0–2, 2–1, 1–0) (OT 0–1) | Finland | Shayba Arena, Sochi; Attendance: 4,211 |

Game reference

Florence Schelling
Goalies
Noora Räty
Referee:
(United States) Erin Blair
Linesmen:
(United States) Laura Johnson
(Slovakia) Michaela Kúdelová

| | 0–1 | 07:56 – J. Hiirikoski (M. Jalosuo, M. Karvinen) |
| | 0–2 | 09:55 – M. Karvinen, (S. Tapani, A. Kilponen) |
| 23:28 – R. Eggimann (N. Bullo) | 1–2 |
| 28:00 – P. Stanz (J. Lutz) (PP) | 2–2 |
| | 2–3 | 35:31 – M. Karvinen (S. Tapani, J. Hiirikoski) (PP) |
| 56:25 – S. Marty (N. Bullo) (PP) | 3–3 |
| | 3–4 | 62:38 – J. Hiirikoski (L. Välimäki, A. Kilponen) |

31 min
Penalties
12 min
27
Shots
34

Quarterfinal

| 15 February 2014; 12:00 | Finland | 2–4 (0–0, 1–0, 1–4) | Sweden | Shayba Arena, Sochi; Attendance: 2,917 |

Game reference

Noora Räty
Goalies
Valentina Wallner
Referee:
(Germany) Nicole Hertrich
Linesmen:
(Canada) Stephanie Gagnon
(United States) Laura Johnson

| V. Hovi (L. Välimäki) – 33:16 | 1–0 |
| | 1–1 | 40:48 – A. Borgqvist (PP) |
| | 1–2 | 45:09 – L. Wester (J. Asserholt, P. Winberg) |
| E. Nuutinen (K. Rantamäki, R. Lindstedt) – 45:21 | 2–2 |
| | 2–3 | 55:45 – E. Eliasson (M. Löwenhielm, E. Grahm) (PP) |
| | 2–4 | 59:19 – E. Nordin (P. Winberg) (EN) |

12 min
Penalties
10 min
31
Shots
32

5th-8th place semifinal

| 16 February 2014; 12:00 | Finland | 2–1 (2–0, 0–1, 0–0) | Germany | Shayba Arena, Sochi; Attendance: 2,009 |

Game reference

Noora Räty
Goalies
Jennifer Harß
Referee:
(Norway) Aina Hove
Linesmen:
(Slovakia) Michaela Kúdeľová
(Czech Republic) Zuzana Svobodová

| J. Hiirikoski (R. Välilä) (PP) – 01:15 | 1–0 |
| M. Karvinen (R. Välilä, S. Tapani) – 08:32 | 2–0 |
| | 2–1 | 28:59 – B. Evers (S. Götz) (PP) |

8 min
Penalties
8 min
27
Shots
21

5th place game

| 18 February 2014; 16:30 | Finland | 4–0 (2–0, 0–0, 2–0) | Russia | Shayba Arena, Sochi; Attendance: 4,112 |

Game reference

Noora Räty
Goalies
Anna Prugova
Referee:
(United States) Erin Blair
Linesmen:
(Canada) Stephanie Gagnon
(United States) Laura Johnson

| L. Välimäki (K. Rantamäki, V. Hovi) – 16:37 | 1–0 |
| R. Välilä (S. Tapani, J. Hiirikoski) – 17:28 | 2–0 |
| M. Karvinen (R. Välilä, S. Tarkki) – 42:30 | 3–0 |
| M. Karvinen (R. Välilä, M. Tuominen) (PP) – 43:31 | 4–0 |

14 min
Penalties
12 min
29
Shots
19

== Nordic combined ==
Finland has awarded a total quota of 4 athletes and a spot in the team relay, based on points achieved in the FIS Nordic Combined World Cup and secondarily in the FIS Nordic Combined Continental Cup during the qualification period of July 2012–19 January 2014.

| Athlete | Event | Ski jumping | | | Cross-country | | Total | |
| Athlete | Event | Distance | Points | Rank | Time | Rank | Time | Rank |
|---|---|---|---|---|---|---|---|---|
| Ilkka Herola | Normal hill/10 km | 94.0 | 111.9 | 29 | 23:41.9 | 9 | 24:59.9 | 16 |
| Ilkka Herola | Large hill/10 km | 126.5 | 106.8 | 16 | 22:42.2 | 9 | 24:11.2 | 14 |
| Mikke Leinonen | Normal hill/10 km | 92.0 | 106.7 | 37 | 25:30.3 | 37 | 27:09.3 | 40 |
| Mikke Leinonen | Large hill/10 km | 118.5 | 89.9 | 42 | 24:43.4 | 41 | 27:19.4 | 42 |
| Janne Ryynänen | Normal hill/10 km | 93.5 | 108.2 | 31 | 25:01.0 | 33 | 26:24.0 | 36 |
| Janne Ryynänen | Large hill/10 km | 117.0 | 91.7 | 40 | 24:16.9 | 37 | 26:45.9 | 40 |
| Eetu Vähäsöyrinki | Normal hill/10 km | 94.5 | 112.4 | 26 | 25:32.7 | 38 | 26:48.7 | 38 |
| Eetu Vähäsöyrinki | Large hill/10 km | 124.5 | 99.3 | =27 | 24:25.2 | 39 | 26:24.2 | 38 |
| Ilkka Herola; Mikke Leinonen; Janne Ryynänen; Eetu Vähäsöyrinki | Team large hill/4×5 km | did not start | | | | | | |

== Ski jumping ==
Finland has qualified a total quota of six athletes (five men and one woman) by the International Ski Federation (FIS), based on their performances at the FIS Ski Jumping World Cup and secondarily on the Continental Cup results during the qualification period of July 2012–19 January 2014.

Men

| Athlete | Event | Qualification | | | First round | | | Final | | | Total | |
| Athlete | Event | Distance | Points | Rank | Distance | Points | Rank | Distance | Points | Rank | Points | Rank |
|---|---|---|---|---|---|---|---|---|---|---|---|---|
| Janne Ahonen | Normal hill | 89.0 | 107.8 | 27 Q | 97.0 | 118.9 | 29 | 92.5 | 110.3 | 28 | 229.2 | 29 |
| Janne Ahonen | Large hill | 126.5 | 62.7 | 11 Q | 126.0 | 119.8 | 20 Q | 123.0 | 121.5 | 19 | 241.3 | 22 |
| Anssi Koivuranta | Normal hill | 89.5 | 104.5 | 37 Q | 99.5 | 126.1 | 13 | 101.5 | 126.7 | 6 | 252.8 | 12 |
| Anssi Koivuranta | Large hill | 128.5 | 66.3 | 5 Q | 131.5 | 130.9 | 5 Q | 121.5 | 119.7 | 21 | 250.6 | 11 |
| Jarkko Määttä | Normal hill | 91.5 | 104.6 | 36 Q | 96.5 | 116.9 | 32 | did not advance | | | | |
| Jarkko Määttä | Large hill | 118.0 | 47.4 | 33 Q | 124.0 | 101.3 | 43 | did not advance | | | | |
| Olli Muotka | Normal hill | 91.0 | 107.0 | 30 Q | 92.5 | 113.0 | 38 | did not advance | | | | |
| Olli Muotka | Large hill | 128.5 | 66.3 | 12 Q | 124.5 | 108.9 | 33 | did not advance | | | | |
| Janne Ahonen; Anssi Koivuranta; Jarkko Määttä; Olli Muotka | Team large hill | —N/a | | | 505.5 | 461.5 | 8 Q | 512 | 481.3 | 8 | 942.8 | 8 |

Women

| Athlete | Event | First round | | | Final | | | Total | |
| Athlete | Event | Distance | Points | Rank | Distance | Points | Rank | Points | Rank |
|---|---|---|---|---|---|---|---|---|---|
| Julia Kykkänen | Normal hill | 95.5 | 115.1 | 14 | 93.5 | 106.4 | 20 | 221.5 | 17 |

== Snowboarding ==
Finland has awarded a total quota of 13 spots (10 in men's events and 3 in women's) by the International Ski Federation (FIS) based on competitions in the International FIS Calendar during the period of July 2012–9 January 2014. On 31 January 2014, slopestyle snowboarder Petja Piiroinen was originally selected to the Finnish Olympic team, but was relegated into a reserve after a scheduling adjustment.

Halfpipe

| Athlete | Event | Qualification | | | | Semifinal | | | | Final | | | |
| Athlete | Event | Run 1 | Run 2 | Best | Rank | Run 1 | Run 2 | Best | Rank | Run 1 | Run 2 | Best | Rank |
|---|---|---|---|---|---|---|---|---|---|---|---|---|---|
| Janne Korpi | Men's halfpipe | 28.00 | 41.00 | 41.00 | 17 | did not advance | | | | | | | |
| Ilkka-Eemeli Laari | Men's halfpipe | 49.00 | 52.00 | 52.00 | 18 | did not advance | | | | | | | |
| Markus Malin | Men's halfpipe | 33.50 | 62.50 | 62.50 | 13 | did not advance | | | | | | | |
| Peetu Piiroinen | Men's halfpipe | DNS | | | | did not advance | | | | | | | |
| Ella Suitiala | Women's halfpipe | 31.75 | 51.50 | 51.50 | 10 | did not advance | | | | | | | |

Slopestyle

| Athlete | Event | Qualification | | | | Semifinal | | | | Final | | | |
| Athlete | Event | Run 1 | Run 2 | Best | Rank | Run 1 | Run 2 | Best | Rank | Run 1 | Run 2 | Best | Rank |
|---|---|---|---|---|---|---|---|---|---|---|---|---|---|
| Janne Korpi | Men's slopestyle | 49.75 | 35.50 | 49.75 | 12 QS | 41.00 | 68.50 | 68.50 | 10 | did not advance | | | |
| Ville Paumola | Men's slopestyle | 54.75 | 21.25 | 54.25 | 11 QS | 25.25 | 22.75 | 25.25 | 19 | did not advance | | | |
| Peetu Piiroinen | Men's slopestyle | 90.75 | 80.00 | 90.75 | 2 QF | BYE | | | | 78.50 | 81.25 | 81.25 | 7 |
| Roope Tonteri | Men's slopestyle | 33.75 | 95.75 | 95.75 | 2 QF | BYE | | | | 31.50 | 39.00 | 39.00 | 11 |
| Merika Enne | Women's slopestyle | 17.00 | DNS | 17.00 | 10 QS | DNS | | | | did not advance | | | |
| Enni Rukajärvi | Women's slopestyle | 79.00 | 23.75 | 79.00 | 4 QF | BYE | | | | 73.75 | 92.50 | 92.50 | 2nd place, silver medalist(s) |

Qualification Legend: QF – Qualify directly to final; QS – Qualify to semifinal

Snowboard cross

| Athlete | Event | Seeding | | Round of 16 | Quarterfinal | Semifinal | Final | |
| Athlete | Event | Time | Rank | Position | Position | Position | Position | Rank |
|---|---|---|---|---|---|---|---|---|
| Anton Lindfors | Men's snowboard cross | CAN | | 2 Q | 4 | did not advance | | =13 |
| Jussi Taka | Men's snowboard cross | CAN | | 5 | did not advance | | | =33 |

== Speed skating ==
Finland has awarded four spots (all in the men's events, while the nation has the first priority for a reserve spot in the women's) based on their performance at the 2013–14 ISU Speed Skating World Cup.

Men

| Athlete | Event | Race 1 | | Race 2 | | Final | |
| Athlete | Event | Time | Rank | Time | Rank | Time | Rank |
|---|---|---|---|---|---|---|---|
| Pekka Koskela | 500 m | 35.19 | 15 | 35.41 | 20 | 70.61 | 17 |
| Pekka Koskela | 1000 m | —N/a | | | | DNS | |
| Mika Poutala | 500 m | 35.58 | 30 | 35.56 | 27 | 71.14 | 29 |
| Tommi Pulli | 1000 m | —N/a | | | | 1:12.16 | 37 |

== Miscellaneous ==
=== Sport psychologist ===
In order to improve mental training in the team, the Finnish Olympic Committee recruited a sport psychologist, Hannaleena Ronkainen. This was a part of a long-term coaching program launched in 2013 with a target to reach its fullest by 2016. Mental trainer and sprinter Hanna-Maari Latvala expressed scepticism at the haste in which the project was launched, and the capability of a single psychologist to service a team of one hundred representing various sports. The women's ice hockey team have a dedicated psychologist, Sari Honkanen.

=== Limited accreditations ===
The staff accreditations in an Olympic team were limited by a quota based on the number of athletes, and the Finnish Olympic Committee could not send as many coaches as they wished. Some personal coaches left out, who without an accreditation would have had to attend as spectators with little personal contact with their athletes, preferred to remain in Finland and rely on telephone communications. A vocal critic was Ari Saukko, the personal coach of Janne Ahonen, who was denied accreditation by the committee, and after public complaints was offered an unsatisfactory alternative trip arrangement, which he would have had to pay for in his own expense.

=== Political boycotts by Finns ===
Minister of Culture and Sport of Finland Paavo Arhinmäki decided not to participate the opening ceremony, citing human rights violations and environmental issues, but planned to visit some of the events, and objected to an athletes' boycott. President Sauli Niinistö and Prime Minister Jyrki Katainen will attend the opening ceremony. The Left Youth had earlier called for a boycott on the games on behalf of Niinistö, Katainen and Arhinmäki. Minister for Foreign Affairs Erkki Tuomioja opposed boycotts and wished the games to be held separate from politics. However, Jari Porttila reported, that only Niinistö had been invited to the opening ceremony, and Arhinmäki had received a reservation merely for the final days of the games.

== See also ==
- Finland at the 2014 Winter Paralympics
