= Ice hockey at the 2014 Winter Olympics – Men's tournament =

2014 Winter Olympics
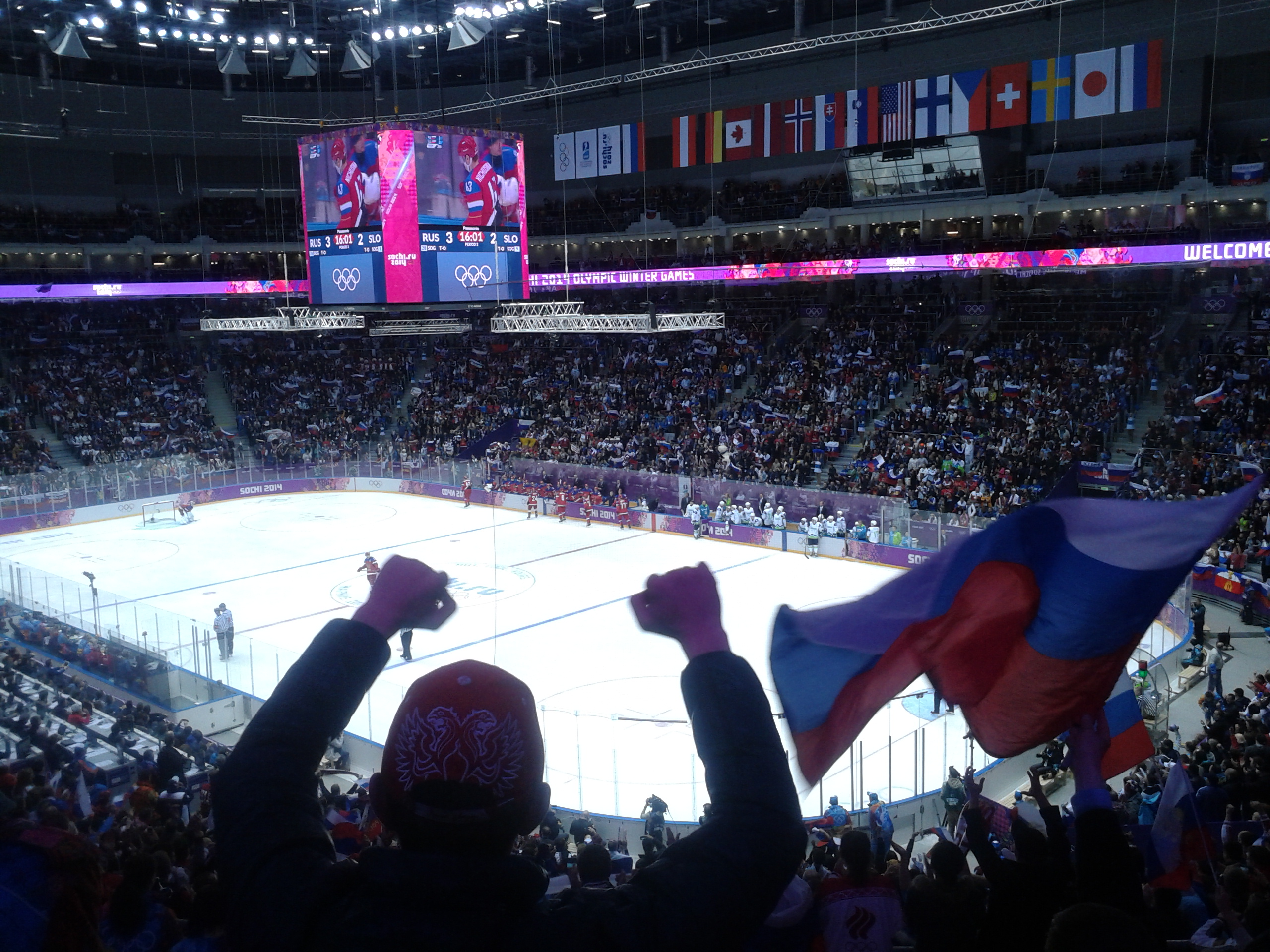
- Fans during the Russia vs Slovenia game

Tournament details
- Host country: Russia
- Venue(s): Bolshoy Ice Dome; Shayba Arena
- Dates: 12–23 February
- Teams: 12

Final positions
- Champions: Canada (9th title)
- Runners-up: Sweden
- Third place: Finland
- Fourth place: United States

Tournament statistics
- Games played: 30
- Goals scored: 141 (4.7 per game)
- Attendance: 245,200 (8,173 per game)
- Scoring leader: Phil Kessel (8 points)

Awards
- MVP: Teemu Selänne

The men's tournament in ice hockey at the 2014 Winter Olympics was held in Sochi, Russia between 12–23 February 2014. For the fifth consecutive Olympics, players from the National Hockey League participated. Twelve countries qualified for the tournament; nine of them did so automatically by virtue of their ranking by the International Ice Hockey Federation, while the other three took part in a qualification tournament.

In the semifinals, Canada defeated the United States, and Sweden beat Finland. Finland finished with the bronze medal, beating the United States, with 43-year-old captain Teemu Selänne awarded as the MVP of the tournament, scoring twice in the bronze-medal game. In the final, Canada defeated Sweden to win the tournament for the ninth time, and avenged their 1994 gold medal loss.

With the gold medal, Canada became the first men's team to successfully defend an Olympic title since the Soviet Union in 1988, the first team to finish the tournament undefeated since 1984 and the first to do both with the full NHL participation.

Canada surrendered only three goals in six games, the fewest allowed by a gold medallist since 1928 when Canada shut out the opposition in a three-game tournament. Canada also scored only seventeen goals, the fewest by a gold medal-winning team in Olympic history, although Great Britain averaged fewer goals per game at the 1936 Winter Olympics (nineteen goals in eight games).

== Venue ==
Bolshoy Ice Dome Capacity: 12,035	Shayba Arena Capacity: 7,000
Bolshoy Ice Dome	Shayba Arena
(Russia) Sochi	(Russia) Sochi

== Qualification ==
Canada, Czech Republic, Finland, Norway, Russia, Slovakia, Sweden, Switzerland, and the United States qualified as the top nine teams in the IIHF World Ranking in 2012. Austria, Latvia, and Slovenia qualified by winning the qualification tournament.

== Rosters ==
Group A	Group B	Group C
Russia; Slovakia; United States; Slovenia	Finland; Canada; Norway; Austria	Czech Republic; Sweden; Switzerland; Latvia

== Officials ==
The IIHF selected 14 referees and 14 linesmen to work the 2014 Winter Olympics. They were the following:

Games were primarily officiated by NHL referees, a stipulation by the NHL if most Olympic players are NHLers, according to the IIHF (not NHL) rules.

Referees

- (Germany) Lars Brüggemann
- (Canada) Dave Jackson
- (Czech Republic) Antonín Jeřábek
- (Canada) Mike Leggo
- (United States) Brad Meier
- (Russia) Konstantin Olenin
- (Canada) Tim Peel

Referees

- (Germany) Daniel Piechaczek
- (Canada) Kevin Pollock
- (Finland) Jyri Rönn
- (Czech Republic) Vladimír Šindler
- (Canada) Kelly Sutherland
- (Sweden) Marcus Vinnerborg
- (United States) Ian Walsh

Linesmen

- (Canada) Derek Amell
- (Canada) Lonnie Cameron
- (Canada) Chris Carlson
- (Belarus) Ivan Dedioulia
- (Canada) Greg Devorski
- (United States) Tommy George
- (Canada) Brad Kovachik

Linesmen

- (United States) Andy McElman
- (Germany) André Schrader
- (Finland) Sakari Suominen
- (Slovakia) Miroslav Valach
- (Canada) Mark Wheler
- (Canada) Jesse Wilmot
- (United States) Chris Woodworth

== Preliminary round ==
=== Tiebreak criteria ===
In each group, teams were ranked according to the following criteria:

1. Number of points (three points for a regulation-time win, two points for an overtime or shootout win, one point for an overtime or shootout defeat, no points for a regulation-time defeat);
2. In case two teams were tied on points, the result of their head-to-head game determined the ranking;
3. In case three or four teams were tied on points, the following criteria applied (if, after applying a criterion, only two teams remained tied, the result of their head-to-head game determined their ranking):
  1. Points obtained in head-to-head games between the teams concerned;
  2. Goal differential in head-to-head games between the teams concerned;
  3. Number of goals scored in head-to-head games between the teams concerned;
  4. If three teams remained tied, result of head-to-head games between each of the teams concerned and the remaining team in the group (points, goal difference, goals scored);
  5. Pre-tournament seeding, which is based on the 2012 IIHF World Ranking.

All times are local (UTC+4).

=== Group A ===
Team	Pld	W	OTW	OTL	L	GF	GA	GD	Pts	Qualification
United States	3	2	1	0	0	15	4	+11	8	Quarterfinals
Russia	3	1	1	1	0	8	5	+3	6	
Slovenia	3	1	0	0	2	6	11	−5	3	
Slovakia	3	0	0	1	2	2	11	−9	1	

Source: IIHF

13 February 2014; 16:30	Russia	5–2 (2–0, 1–2, 2–0)	Slovenia	Bolshoy Ice Dome, Sochi; Attendance: 11,653

Game reference

Semyon Varlamov
Goalies
Robert Kristan
Referees:
(Canada) Dave Jackson
(Czech Republic) Vladimír Šindler
Linesmen:
(Canada) Lonnie Cameron
(Canada) Chris Carlson

A. Ovechkin (E. Malkin, A. Semin) – 1:17	1–0
E. Malkin (A. Ovechkin, E. Medvedev) – 3:54	2–0
	2–1	21:43 – Ž. Jeglič (M. Robar)
I. Kovalchuk (E. Malkin, A. Radulov) (PP) – 37:48	3–1
	3–2	38:52 – Ž. Jeglič (R. Sabolič, A. Kopitar)
V. Nichushkin (A. Tereshchenko) – 43:59	4–2
A. Belov (N. Nikitin, A. Tereshchenko) – 47:53	5–2

6 min
Penalties
6 min
35
Shots
14

13 February 2014; 16:30	Slovakia	1–7 (0–1, 1–6, 0–0)	United States	Shayba Arena, Sochi; Attendance: 4,119

Game reference

Jaroslav Halák (out 33:30)
Peter Budaj (in 33:30)
Goalies
Jonathan Quick
Referees:
(Czech Republic) Antonín Jeřábek
(Canada) Kevin Pollock
Linesmen:
(Canada) Mark Wheler
(Canada) Jesse Wilmot

	0–1	14:27 – J. Carlson (P. Kessel, J. van Riemsdyk)
T. Tatar (Mari. Hossa) – 20:24	1–1
	1–2	21:26 – R. Kesler (P. Kane)
	1–3	22:32 – P. Stastny (M. Pacioretty, T. Oshie)
	1–4	28:16 – D. Backes (P. Kessel)
	1–5	33:30 – P. Stastny (K. Shattenkirk, T. Oshie)
	1–6	34:20 – P. Kessel (R. Kesler, J. van Riemsdyk)
	1–7	35:17 – D. Brown (J. Carlson, P. Kane)

4 min
Penalties
2 min
23
Shots
33

15 February 2014; 12:00	Slovakia	1–3 (0–0, 0–0, 1–3)	Slovenia	Bolshoy Ice Dome, Sochi; Attendance: 7,438

Game reference

Jaroslav Halák
Goalies
Robert Kristan
Referees:
(Russia) Konstantin Olenin
(United States) Tim Peel
Linesmen:
(Canada) Derek Amell
(Belarus) Ivan Dedioulia

	0–1	43:23 – R. Tičar (Ž. Jeglič, R. Sabolič) (PP)
	0–2	48:59 – T. Razingar (J. Urbas, M. Rodman)
	0–3	49:22 – A. Kopitar (J. Muršak)
T. Jurčo (T. Záborský, Z. Chára) (PP) – 59:42	1–3

8 min
Penalties
10 min
28
Shots
31

15 February 2014; 16:30	United States	3–2 (SO) (0–0, 1–1, 1–1, 0–0, 1–0)	Russia	Bolshoy Ice Dome, Sochi; Attendance: 11,678

Game reference

Jonathan Quick
Goalies
Sergei Bobrovsky
Referees:
(United States) Brad Meier
(Sweden) Marcus Vinnerborg
Linesmen:
(Canada) Greg Devorski
(Canada) Jesse Wilmot

	0–1	29:15 – P. Datsyuk (A. Markov, A. Radulov)
C. Fowler (J. van Riemsdyk, P. Kessel) (PP) – 36:34	1–1
J. Pavelski (P. Kane, K. Shattenkirk) (PP) – 49:27	2–1
	2–2	52:44 – P. Datsyuk (A. Markov) (PP)

T. Oshie
J. van Riemsdyk (miss)
J. Pavelski (miss)
T. Oshie (miss)
T. Oshie
T. Oshie
T. Oshie (miss)
T. Oshie
Shootout
(miss) E. Malkin
(miss) P. Datsyuk
I. Kovalchuk
(miss) I. Kovalchuk
P. Datsyuk
I. Kovalchuk
(miss) P. Datsyuk
(miss) I. Kovalchuk
12 min
Penalties
10 min
34
Shots
31

A Russian goal scored late in the third period, which would have given the team a 3–2 lead, was disallowed after referees ruled that the net was moved when the goal was scored. The decision resulted in the score remaining 2–2. USA went on to win the game in a shootout, which resulted in Russia playing a playoff qualification game while USA received a bye to the quarterfinals. The decision was criticized by many Russian politicians, TV hosts and commentators. Following the game, protesters led by the Kremlin party's youth group held a demonstration in front of the U.S. Embassy in Moscow to protest the decision. In response to the controversy, Konstantin Komissarov, the referee supervisor of International Ice Hockey Federation, officially confirmed that the decision by the referee was correct, citing the appropriate use of video review in assessing the play.

16 February 2014; 16:30	Russia	1–0 (SO) (0–0, 0–0, 0–0, 0–0, 1–0)	Slovakia	Bolshoy Ice Dome, Sochi; Attendance: 11,097

Game reference
Semyon Varlamov	Goalies	Ján Laco	Referees: (Germany) Lars Brüggemann (Canada) Kelly Sutherland; Linesmen: (Canada) Chris Carlson (United States) Andy McElman
A. Radulov; I. Kovalchuk	Shootout	(miss) M. Handzuš; (miss) T. Tatar	Referees: (Germany) Lars Brüggemann (Canada) Kelly Sutherland; Linesmen: (Canada) Chris Carlson (United States) Andy McElman
4 min	Penalties	10 min	Referees: (Germany) Lars Brüggemann (Canada) Kelly Sutherland; Linesmen: (Canada) Chris Carlson (United States) Andy McElman
37	Shots	27	Referees: (Germany) Lars Brüggemann (Canada) Kelly Sutherland; Linesmen: (Canada) Chris Carlson (United States) Andy McElman

16 February 2014; 16:30	Slovenia	1–5 (0–2, 0–2, 1–1)	United States	Shayba Arena, Sochi; Attendance: 4,892

Game reference

Luka Gračnar
Goalies
Ryan Miller
Referees:
(Canada) Mike Leggo
(Finland) Jyri Rönn
Linesmen:
(Slovakia) Miroslav Valach
(Canada) Mark Wheler

	0–1	1:04 – P. Kessel (J. Pavelski)
	0–2	4:33 – P. Kessel (J. Pavelski, B. Orpik)
	0–3	31:05 – P. Kessel (J. van Riemsdyk, J. Pavelski)
	0–4	32:17 – R. McDonagh (B. Wheeler, T. Oshie)
	0–5	43:26 – D. Backes (R. Callahan, D. Brown)
M. Rodman (D. Rodman, J. Urbas) – 59:42	1–5

4 min
Penalties
6 min
18
Shots
28

=== Group B ===
Team	Pld	W	OTW	OTL	L	GF	GA	GD	Pts	Qualification
Canada	3	2	1	0	0	11	2	+9	8	Quarterfinals
Finland	3	2	0	1	0	15	7	+8	7	Quarterfinals
Austria	3	1	0	0	2	7	15	−8	3	
Norway	3	0	0	0	3	3	12	−9	0	

Source: IIHF

13 February 2014; 12:00	Finland	8–4 (4–2, 2–0, 2–2)	Austria	Bolshoy Ice Dome, Sochi; Attendance: 5,664

Game reference

Tuukka Rask
Goalies
Bernhard Starkbaum
Referees:
(Germany) Daniel Piechaczek
(United States) Ian Walsh
Linesmen:
(United States) Tommy George
(Canada) Brad Kovachik

	0–1	0:36 – M. Grabner (M. Raffl)
M. Granlund (T. Selänne, S. Vatanen) – 5:15	1–1
	1–2	9:19 – T. Hundertpfund (T. Vanek, O. Setzinger)
S. Lepistö (J. Jokinen, T. Ruutu) – 11:23	2–2
O. Määttä (O. Jokinen) – 19:25	3–2
J. Immonen (J. Lehterä, O. Väänänen) – 19:33	4–2
J. Jokinen (P. Kontiola) – 21:43	5–2
P. Kontiola (M. Granlund) – 32:10	6–2
	6–3	41:29 – M. Grabner (M. Raffl, B. Lebler)
J. Immonen (A. Barkov, S. Vatanen) (PP) – 51:25	7–3
	7–4	54:22 – M. Grabner (M. Trattnig, B. Lebler)
M. Granlund (K. Timonen, S. Vatanen) (PP) – 58:25	8–4

4 min
Penalties
10 min
52
Shots
20

13 February 2014; 21:00	Canada	3–1 (0–0, 2–0, 1–1)	Norway	Bolshoy Ice Dome, Sochi; Attendance: 10,261

Game reference

Carey Price
Goalies
Lars Haugen
Referees:
(Canada) Mike Leggo
(Sweden) Marcus Vinnerborg
Linesmen:
(United States) Andy McElman
(United States) Chris Woodworth

S. Weber (D. Keith, P. Bergeron) – 26:20	1–0
J. Benn (P. Bergeron, D. Doughty) – 35:19	2–0
	2–1	40:22 – P. Thoresen (M. Olimb) (PP)
D. Doughty (R. Getzlaf, P. Marleau) – 41:47	3–1

10 min
Penalties
6 min
38
Shots
20

14 February 2014; 21:00	Canada	6–0 (2–0, 4–0, 0–0)	Austria	Bolshoy Ice Dome, Sochi; Attendance: 8,969

Game reference

Roberto Luongo
Goalies
Bernhard Starkbaum (out 40:00)
Mathias Lange (in 40:00)
Referees:
(Canada) Dave Jackson
(Russia) Konstantin Olenin
Linesmen:
(Canada) Lonnie Cameron
(Slovakia) Miroslav Valach

D. Doughty (J. Toews) – 5:24	1–0
S. Weber (C. Perry, R. Getzlaf) – 10:12	2–0
J. Carter (P. Marleau, S. Crosby) – 22:39	3–0
J. Carter (P. Marleau, A. Pietrangelo) – 24:09	4–0
J. Carter (P. Marleau, S. Weber) – 34:33	5–0
R. Getzlaf (SH) – 36:48	6–0

8 min
Penalties
2 min
46
Shots
23

14 February 2014; 21:00	Norway	1–6 (0–3, 0–2, 1–1)	Finland	Shayba Arena, Sochi; Attendance: 3,018

Game reference

Lars Haugen (out 20:00)
Lars Volden (in 20:00)
Goalies
Kari Lehtonen
Referees:
(Germany) Lars Brüggemann
(Canada) Kelly Sutherland
Linesmen:
(Canada) Derek Amell
(Canada) Chris Carlson

	0–1	5:46 – T. Selänne (S. Vatanen, K. Lehtonen)
	0–2	6:51 – L. Korpikoski (O. Jokinen, O. Määttä)
	0–3	17:21 – J. Lehterä
	0–4	28:03 – L. Korpikoski (O. Määttä, T. Ruutu)
	0–5	31:26 – O. Jokinen (S. Salo, T. Ruutu)
P. Skrøder (M. Olimb, J. Holøs) (PP2) – 41:01	1–5
	1–6	57:41 – O. Määttä (P. Kontiola, K. Lehtonen)

6 min
Penalties
6 min
21
Shots
39

16 February 2014; 12:00	Austria	3–1 (2–0, 0–1, 1–0)	Norway	Bolshoy Ice Dome, Sochi; Attendance: 6,882

Game reference

Mathias Lange
Goalies
Lars Haugen
Referees:
(Czech Republic) Vladimír Šindler
(United States) Ian Walsh
Linesmen:
(Canada) Lonnie Cameron
(Germany) André Schrader

M. Grabner (T. Pöck, R. Lukas) – 4:27	1–0
M. Raffl (M. Grabner) (PP) – 6:52	2–0
	2–1	28:05 – P. Skrøder (P. Thoresen)
M. Grabner (D. Welser) – 58:23	3–1

12 min
Penalties
8 min
27
Shots
35

16 February 2014; 21:00	Finland	1–2 (OT) (0–1, 1–0, 0–0, 0–1)	Canada	Bolshoy Ice Dome, Sochi; Attendance: 11,263

Game reference

Tuukka Rask
Goalies
Carey Price
Referees:
(Czech Republic) Antonín Jeřábek
(Canada) Kevin Pollock
Linesmen:
(Belarus) Ivan Dedioulia
(Canada) Brad Kovachik

	0–1	13:44 – D. Doughty (S. Weber, S. Crosby) (PP)
T. Ruutu (J. Jokinen, O. Väänänen) – 38:00	1–1
	1–2	62:32 – D. Doughty (J. Carter)

2 min
Penalties
2 min
15
Shots
27

=== Group C ===
Team	Pld	W	OTW	OTL	L	GF	GA	GD	Pts	Qualification
Sweden	3	3	0	0	0	10	5	+5	9	Quarterfinals
Switzerland	3	2	0	0	1	2	1	+1	6	
Czech Republic	3	1	0	0	2	6	7	−1	3	
Latvia	3	0	0	0	3	5	10	−5	0	

Source: ESPN

12 February 2014; 21:00	Czech Republic	2–4 (0–2, 2–2, 0–0)	Sweden	Bolshoy Ice Dome, Sochi; Attendance: 11,419

Game reference

Jakub Kovář (out 20:51)
Alexander Salák (in 20:51)
Goalies
Henrik Lundqvist
Referees:
(Russia) Konstantin Olenin
(Canada) Kelly Sutherland
Linesmen:
(Belarus) Ivan Dedioulia
(Canada) Greg Devorski

	0–1	10:07 – E. Karlsson (O. Ekman-Larsson, A. Steen)
	0–2	13:17 – P. Berglund (O. Ekman-Larsson, H. Lundqvist)
	0–3	20:51 – H. Zetterberg (G. Landeskog, N. Kronwall)
	0–4	24:07 – E. Karlsson (D. Sedin, N. Bäckström) (PP)
M. Židlický (P. Eliáš) – 28:12	1–4
J. Jágr (T. Plekanec, T. Kaberle) – 30:01	2–4

10 min
Penalties
10 min
29
Shots
25

12 February 2014; 21:00	Latvia	0–1 (0–0, 0–0, 0–1)	Switzerland	Shayba Arena, Sochi; Attendance: 5,116

Game reference
Edgars Masaļskis	Goalies	Jonas Hiller	Referees: (Germany) Lars Brüggemann (United States) Brad Meier; Linesmen: (Canada) Derek Amell (Finland) Sakari Suominen
0–1 / 59:52 – S. Moser (M. Streit)			Referees: (Germany) Lars Brüggemann (United States) Brad Meier; Linesmen: (Canada) Derek Amell (Finland) Sakari Suominen
10 min	Penalties	6 min	Referees: (Germany) Lars Brüggemann (United States) Brad Meier; Linesmen: (Canada) Derek Amell (Finland) Sakari Suominen
21	Shots	39	Referees: (Germany) Lars Brüggemann (United States) Brad Meier; Linesmen: (Canada) Derek Amell (Finland) Sakari Suominen

14 February 2014; 12:00	Czech Republic	4–2 (2–1, 2–1, 0–0)	Latvia	Bolshoy Ice Dome, Sochi; Attendance: 5,831

Game reference

Ondřej Pavelec
Goalies
Edgars Masaļskis
Referees:
(United States) Tim Peel
(Finland) Jyri Rönn
Linesmen:
(Germany) André Schrader
(Canada) Mark Wheler

M. Erat (D. Krejčí, A. Hemský) – 10:10	1–0
	1–1	13:05 – J. Sprukts (K. Rēdlihs, L. Dārziņš) (PP)
J. Jágr (M. Židlický, T. Plekanec) (PP) – 19:29	2–1
	2–2	22:45 – H. Vasiļjevs (G. Pujacs)
J. Voráček (Z. Michálek) – 27:06	3–2
M. Židlický (M. Hanzal, P. Nedvěd) – 37:02	4–2

8 min
Penalties
8 min
39
Shots
20

14 February 2014; 16:30	Sweden	1–0 (0–0, 0–0, 1–0)	Switzerland	Bolshoy Ice Dome, Sochi; Attendance: 7,968

Game reference
Henrik Lundqvist	Goalies	Reto Berra	Referees: (Canada) Mike Leggo (Czech Republic) Vladimír Šindler; Linesmen: (Canada) Greg Devorski (Finland) Sakari Suominen
D. Alfredsson (E. Karlsson, P. Berglund) – 52:39 / 1–0			Referees: (Canada) Mike Leggo (Czech Republic) Vladimír Šindler; Linesmen: (Canada) Greg Devorski (Finland) Sakari Suominen
4 min	Penalties	8 min	Referees: (Canada) Mike Leggo (Czech Republic) Vladimír Šindler; Linesmen: (Canada) Greg Devorski (Finland) Sakari Suominen
31	Shots	26	Referees: (Canada) Mike Leggo (Czech Republic) Vladimír Šindler; Linesmen: (Canada) Greg Devorski (Finland) Sakari Suominen

15 February 2014; 21:00	Switzerland	1–0 (1–0, 0–0, 0–0)	Czech Republic	Bolshoy Ice Dome, Sochi; Attendance: 10,253

Game reference
Jonas Hiller	Goalies	Ondřej Pavelec	Referees: (Germany) Daniel Piechaczek (Canada) Kevin Pollock; Linesmen: (Canada) Brad Kovachik (United States) Chris Woodworth
S. Bodenmann (D. Hollenstein, K. Romy) – 14:10 / 1–0			Referees: (Germany) Daniel Piechaczek (Canada) Kevin Pollock; Linesmen: (Canada) Brad Kovachik (United States) Chris Woodworth
10 min	Penalties	6 min	Referees: (Germany) Daniel Piechaczek (Canada) Kevin Pollock; Linesmen: (Canada) Brad Kovachik (United States) Chris Woodworth
26	Shots	26	Referees: (Germany) Daniel Piechaczek (Canada) Kevin Pollock; Linesmen: (Canada) Brad Kovachik (United States) Chris Woodworth

15 February 2014; 21:00	Sweden	5–3 (1–1, 3–1, 1–1)	Latvia	Shayba Arena, Sochi; Attendance: 3,709

Game reference

Henrik Lundqvist
Goalies
Kristers Gudļevskis
Referees:
(Czech Republic) Antonín Jeřábek
(United States) Ian Walsh
Linesmen:
(United States) Tommy George
(United States) Andy McElman

P. Berglund (E. Karlsson, A. Steen) (PP) – 15:50	1–0
	1–1	18:48 – L. Dārziņš (J. Sprukts, K. Sotnieks)
	1–2	21:22 – J. Sprukts (K. Rēdlihs, M. Karsums) (PP)
E. Karlsson (N. Bäckström, D. Alfredsson) (PP) – 22:45	2–2
D. Alfredsson (D. Sedin, A. Edler) (PP) – 36:14	3–2
Ji. Ericsson (O. Ekman-Larsson, J. Silfverberg) (PP) – 38:47	4–2
	4–3	41:28 – Z. Girgensons (K. Daugaviņš, R. Freibergs) (PP)
A. Edler (D. Sedin, M. Johansson) – 52:20	5–3

12 min
Penalties
12 min
30
Shots
23

=== Ranking after preliminary round ===
Team advanced to Quarterfinals
Team played in Qualification playoffs

Rank	Team	Group	Pos	GP	Pts	GD	GF	IIHF Rank
1D	Sweden	C	1	3	9	+5	10	1
2D	United States	A	1	3	8	+11	15	6
3D	Canada	B	1	3	8	+9	11	5
4D	Finland	B	2	3	7	+8	15	2
5D	Russia	A	2	3	6	+3	8	3
6D	Switzerland	C	2	3	6	+1	2	7
7D	Czech Republic	C	3	3	3	−1	6	4
8D	Slovenia	A	3	3	3	−5	6	17
9D	Austria	B	3	3	3	−8	7	15
10D	Slovakia	A	4	3	1	−9	2	8
11D	Latvia	C	4	3	0	−5	5	11
12D	Norway	B	4	3	0	−9	3	9

== Playoff round ==
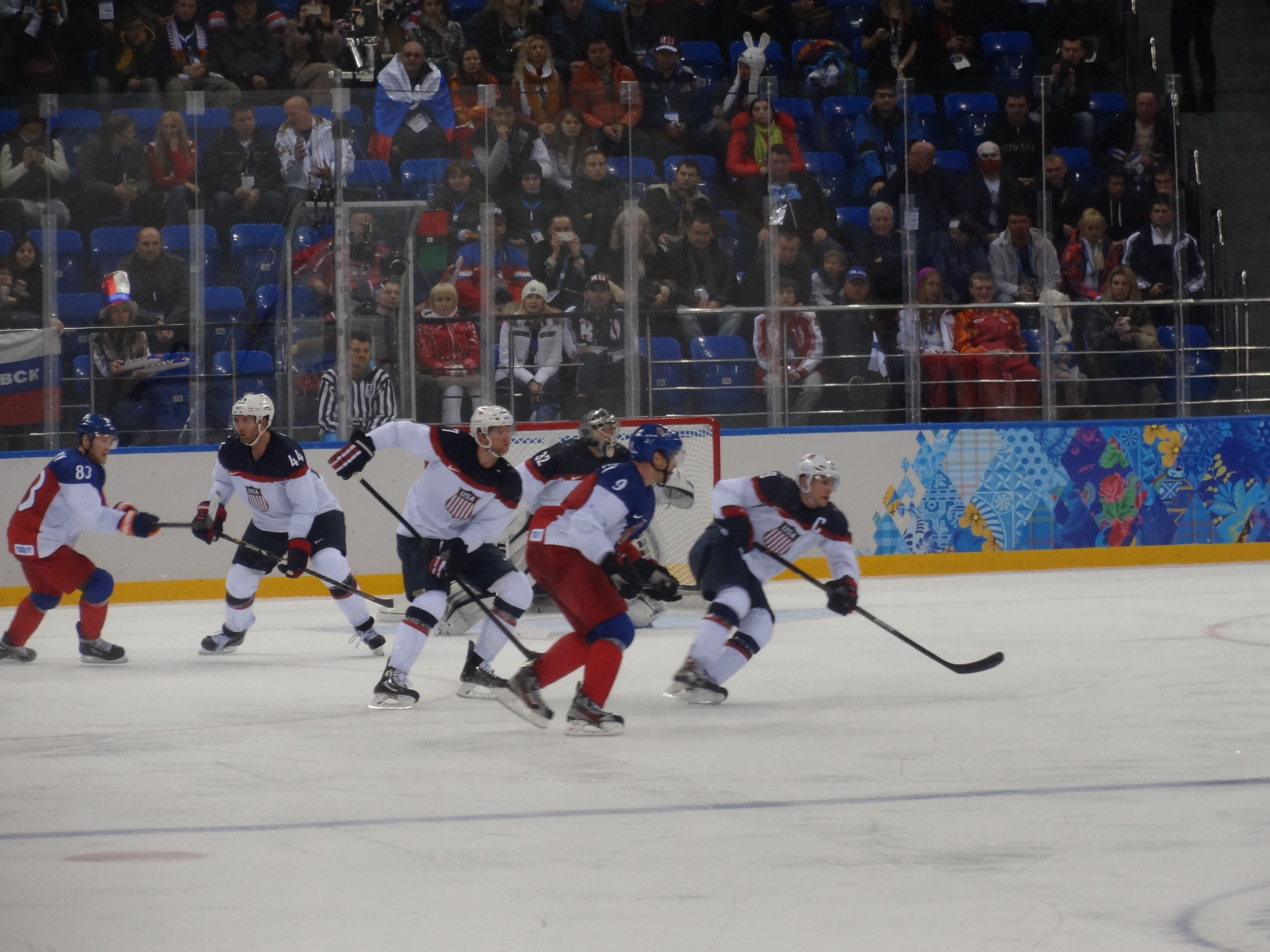
Quarterfinal game between the United States and the Czech Republic

Following the completion of the preliminary round, all teams were ranked 1D through 12D. To determine this ranking, the following criteria were used in the order presented:

1. higher position in the group
2. higher number of points
3. better goal difference
4. higher number of goals scored for
5. better 2013 IIHF World Ranking.

=== Bracket ===
Qualification playoffs
8D	Slovenia	4
9D	Austria	0
5D	Russia	4
12D	Norway	0
6D	Switzerland	1
11D	Latvia	3
7D	Czech Republic	5
10D	Slovakia	3

Quarterfinals
1D	Sweden	5
E4	Slovenia	0
4D	Finland	3
E1	Russia	1
3D	Canada	2
E2	Latvia	1
2D	United States	5
E3	Czech Republic	2

Semifinals
F1	Sweden	2
F4	Finland	1
F3	Canada	1
F2	United States	0

Gold medal game
F1	Sweden	0
F3	Canada	3
Bronze medal game
F4	Finland	5
F2	United States	0

† Indicates overtime victory
‡ Indicates shootout victory

=== Qualification playoffs ===
The four highest-ranked teams (1D–4D) received byes and were deemed the home team in the quarterfinals as they were seeded to advance, with the remaining eight teams (5D–12D) playing qualification playoff games as follows.

18 February 2014; 12:00	Slovenia	4–0 (2–0, 1–0, 1–0)	Austria	Bolshoy Ice Dome, Sochi; Attendance: 6,821

Game reference

Robert Kristan
Goalies
Mathias Lange
Referees:
(Canada) Dave Jackson
(Czech Republic) Vladimír Šindler
Linesmen:
(United States) Tommy George
(United States) Chris Woodworth

A. Kopitar (R. Tičar, Ž. Jeglič) (PP) – 5:29	1–0
J. Urbas (S. Kovačević) (SH) – 11:57	2–0
S. Kovačević (D. Rodman, J. Muršak) – 23:21	3–0
J. Muršak (D. Rodman) (EN) – 57:02	4–0

6 min
Penalties
10 min
35
Shots
30

18 February 2014; 16:30	Russia	4–0 (0–0, 2–0, 2–0)	Norway	Bolshoy Ice Dome, Sochi; Attendance: 11,423

Game reference

Sergei Bobrovsky
Goalies
Lars Haugen
Referees:
(Germany) Daniel Piechaczek
(Canada) Kevin Pollock
Linesmen:
(United States) Andy McElman
(Slovakia) Miroslav Valach

A. Radulov (P. Datsyuk) – 24:12	1–0
I. Kovalchuk (A. Radulov, P. Datsyuk) – 37:11	2–0
A. Radulov (P. Datsyuk) (EN) – 58:53	3–0
A. Tereshchenko (V. Tikhonov, V. Tarasenko) – 59:20	4–0

2 min
Penalties
6 min
31
Shots
22

18 February 2014; 21:00	Switzerland	1–3 (0–2, 1–0, 0–1)	Latvia	Bolshoy Ice Dome, Sochi; Attendance: 7,912

Game reference

Jonas Hiller
Goalies
Edgars Masaļskis
Referees:
(Canada) Mike Leggo
(Finland) Jyri Rönn
Linesmen:
(Canada) Brad Kovachik
(Germany) André Schrader

	0–1	8:38 – O. Bārtulis (K. Daugaviņš, Z. Girgensons)
	0–2	11:19 – L. Dārziņš (M. Rēdlihs) (PP)
M. Plüss (R. Suri) – 35:01	1–2
	1–3	59:00 – L. Dārziņš (V. Pavlovs, E. Masaļskis) (EN)

4 min
Penalties
2 min
33
Shots
22

18 February 2014; 21:00	Czech Republic	5–3 (3–0, 1–1, 1–2)	Slovakia	Shayba Arena, Sochi; Attendance: 3,628

Game reference

Ondřej Pavelec
Goalies
Ján Laco
Referees:
(United States) Tim Peel
(Sweden) Marcus Vinnerborg
Linesmen:
(Canada) Lonnie Cameron
(Finland) Sakari Suominen

A. Hemský (T. Kaberle, J. Voráček) (PP) – 6:53	1–0
R. Červenka (J. Jágr, T. Plekanec) – 7:22	2–0
D. Krejčí (T. Kaberle) (PP) – 17:03	3–0
R. Červenka – 35:41	4–0
	4–1	38:57 – Mari. Hossa (A. Sekera, M. Handzuš)
	4–2	47:20 – Mari. Hossa (T. Tatar, M. Handzuš)
	4–3	48:51 – T. Surový (A. Sekera, M. Bartovič)
T. Plekanec (D. Krejčí, M. Židlický) (PP) (EN) – 59:21	5–3

2 min
Penalties
10 min
29
Shots
32

=== Quarterfinals ===
Teams seeded D1 to D4 were the home teams.

Following the quarterfinal games, the winning teams were re-ranked F1 through F4, with the winner of 1D vs. E4 re-ranked as F1, the winner of 2D vs. E3 re-ranked as F2, the winner of 3D vs. E2 re-ranked as F3, and the winner of 4D vs. E1 re-ranked as F4. The losers of the quarterfinal round games received a final ranking of 5 through 8 based on their preliminary round ranking.

19 February 2014; 12:00	Sweden	5–0 (1–0, 0–0, 4–0)	Slovenia	Bolshoy Ice Dome, Sochi; Attendance: 7,325

Game reference

Henrik Lundqvist
Goalies
Robert Kristan
Referees:
(United States) Brad Meier
(Czech Republic) Vladimír Šindler
Linesmen:
(Canada) Chris Carlson
(Canada) Mark Wheler

A. Steen (D. Alfredsson, E. Karlsson) (PP) – 18:50	1–0
D. Sedin (L. Eriksson) – 41:42	2–0
L. Eriksson (N. Bäckström, J. Oduya) – 48:04	3–0
C. Hagelin (N. Kronwall, Ji. Ericsson) – 51:27	4–0
C. Hagelin (E. Karlsson) – 56:10	5–0

8 min
Penalties
8 min
38
Shots
19

19 February 2014; 16:30	Finland	3–1 (2–1, 1–0, 0–0)	Russia	Bolshoy Ice Dome, Sochi; Attendance: 11,654

Game reference

Tuukka Rask
Goalies
Semyon Varlamov (out 26:42)
Sergei Bobrovsky (in 26:42)
Referees:
(Canada) Kelly Sutherland
(Sweden) Marcus Vinnerborg
Linesmen:
(Canada) Greg Devorski
(Canada) Jesse Wilmot

	0–1	7:51 – I. Kovalchuk (P. Datsyuk) (PP)
J. Aaltonen (P. Kontiola) – 9:18	1–1
T. Selänne (M. Granlund) – 17:38	2–1
M. Granlund (T. Selänne, K. Timonen) (PP) – 25:37	3–1

6 min
Penalties
8 min
22
Shots
38

19 February 2014; 21:00	Canada	2–1 (1–1, 0–0, 1–0)	Latvia	Bolshoy Ice Dome, Sochi; Attendance: 9,825

Game reference

Carey Price
Goalies
Kristers Gudļevskis
Referees:
(United States) Tim Peel
(Finland) Jyri Rönn
Linesmen:
(Canada) Brad Kovachik
(Finland) Sakari Suominen

P. Sharp (R. Nash) – 13:37	1–0
	1–1	15:41 – L. Dārziņš (A. Kulda, J. Sprukts)
S. Weber (D. Doughty, J. Toews) (PP) – 53:06	2–1

6 min
Penalties
6 min
57
Shots
16

19 February 2014; 21:00	United States	5–2 (3–1, 1–0, 1–1)	Czech Republic	Shayba Arena, Sochi; Attendance: 4,606

Game reference

Jonathan Quick
Goalies
Ondřej Pavelec (out 29:31)
Alexander Salák (in 29:31)
Referees:
(Russia) Konstantin Olenin
(Canada) Kevin Pollock
Linesmen:
(Canada) Derek Amell
(Belarus) Ivan Dedioulia

J. van Riemsdyk (R. Kesler, P. Kane) – 1:39	1–0
	1–1	4:31 – A. Hemský
D. Brown (D. Backes, R. Suter) – 14:38	2–1
D. Backes (R. Suter, R. McDonagh) – 19:58	3–1
Z. Parise (J. Pavelski, R. Suter) (PP) – 29:31	4–1
P. Kessel (R. Kesler, K. Shattenkirk) – 42:01	5–1
	5–2	53:00 – A. Hemský

2 min
Penalties
6 min
25
Shots
23

=== Semifinals ===
21 February 2014; 16:00	Sweden	2–1 (0–0, 2–1, 0–0)	Finland	Bolshoy Ice Dome, Sochi; Attendance: 9,476

Game reference

Henrik Lundqvist
Goalies
Kari Lehtonen
Referees:
(Russia) Konstantin Olenin
(United States) Tim Peel
Linesmen:
(Canada) Derek Amell
(Canada) Chris Carlson

	0–1	26:17 – O. Jokinen (S. Vatanen)
L. Eriksson (Jo. Ericsson, N. Bäckström) – 31:39	1–1
E. Karlsson (A. Steen, D. Sedin) (PP) – 36:26	2–1

10 min
Penalties
4 min
25
Shots
26

21 February 2014; 21:00	United States	0–1 (0–0, 0–1, 0–0)	Canada	Bolshoy Ice Dome, Sochi; Attendance: 11,172

Game reference
Jonathan Quick	Goalies	Carey Price	Referees: (United States) Brad Meier (Canada) Kelly Sutherland; Linesmen: (Belarus) Ivan Dedioulia (Canada) Greg Devorski
0–1 / 21:41 – J. Benn (J. Bouwmeester)			Referees: (United States) Brad Meier (Canada) Kelly Sutherland; Linesmen: (Belarus) Ivan Dedioulia (Canada) Greg Devorski
4 min	Penalties	6 min	Referees: (United States) Brad Meier (Canada) Kelly Sutherland; Linesmen: (Belarus) Ivan Dedioulia (Canada) Greg Devorski
31	Shots	37	Referees: (United States) Brad Meier (Canada) Kelly Sutherland; Linesmen: (Belarus) Ivan Dedioulia (Canada) Greg Devorski

=== Bronze medal game ===
22 February 2014; 19:00	United States	0–5 (0–0, 0–2, 0–3)	Finland (bronze)	Bolshoy Ice Dome, Sochi; Attendance: 9,052

Game reference

Jonathan Quick
Goalies
Tuukka Rask
Referees:
(Russia) Konstantin Olenin
(United States) Tim Peel
Linesmen:
(Canada) Chris Carlson
(Belarus) Ivan Dedioulia

0–1	21:27 – T. Selänne (M. Granlund, L. Korpikoski)
0–2	21:38 – J. Jokinen (J. Lehterä, P. Kontiola)
0–3	46:10 – J. Hietanen (T. Ruutu, S. Lepistö)
0–4	49:06 – T. Selänne (M. Granlund, L. Korpikoski) (PP)
0–5	53:09 – O. Määttä (J. Lehterä, J. Jokinen) (PP)

12 min
Penalties
4 min
27
Shots
29

=== Gold medal game ===
Canada won the game 3–0 with goals from Jonathan Toews, Sidney Crosby, and Chris Kunitz, each scoring their first goal of the tournament. Canada shut Sweden out with an overpowering defense limiting them to 24 shots, and Canada's goaltender Carey Price played well when needed. The Canadian team's executive director Steve Yzerman called the performance in Sochi the finest defensive effort ever for a Canadian team. Canada shut out its opponents in the semifinals and final and allowed only three goals in six games. It was also the first time since 1928 that a Canadian team won all its games.

The win represented Canada's second consecutive men's gold in ice hockey, and the third time in four Olympics that Canada won both men's and women's hockey tournaments.

The game was a national phenomenon in Canada, with more than 15 million Canadians watching at least part of the game. Several provinces and cities relaxed their liquor laws to allow bars to open as early as 4 am.

23 February 2014; 16:00	(silver) Sweden	0–3 (0–1, 0–1, 0–1)	Canada (gold)	Bolshoy Ice Dome, Sochi; Attendance: 11,076

Game reference

Henrik Lundqvist
Goalies
Carey Price
Referees:
(United States) Brad Meier
(Canada) Kelly Sutherland
Linesmen:
(Canada) Derek Amell
(Canada) Greg Devorski

0–1	12:55 – J. Toews (J.Carter, S. Weber)
0–2	35:43 – S. Crosby
0–3	49:04 – C. Kunitz

6 min
Penalties
4 min
24
Shots
36

== Final rankings ==
The final standings of the tournament according to the IIHF:

1st place, gold medalist(s)	Canada
2nd place, silver medalist(s)	Sweden
3rd place, bronze medalist(s)	Finland
4	United States
5	Russia
6	Czech Republic
7	Slovenia
8	Latvia
9	Switzerland
10	Austria
11	Slovakia
12	Norway

== Statistics ==
=== Average age ===
Team Czech Republic was the oldest team in the tournament, averaging 30 years and 7 months. Team USA was the youngest team in the tournament, averaging 27 years and 6 months. Gold medalists Team Canada averaged 28 years and 9 months. Tournament average was 28 years and 10 months.

=== Leading scorers ===
Rankings based upon points, and sorted by goals.

Rank	Player	GP	G	A	Pts	PIM	+/−
1	Phil Kessel (USA)	6	5	3	8	4	+6
2	Erik Karlsson (SWE)	6	4	4	8	0	+5
3	Mikael Granlund (FIN)	6	3	4	7	4	+3
4	James van Riemsdyk (USA)	6	1	6	7	2	+7
5	Michael Grabner (AUT)	4	5	1	6	0	−2
6	Drew Doughty (CAN)	6	4	2	6	0	+4
7	Teemu Selänne (FIN)	6	4	2	6	4	+3
8	Alexander Radulov (RUS)	5	3	3	6	4	+4
9	Shea Weber (CAN)	6	3	3	6	0	+5
10	Pavel Datsyuk (RUS)	5	2	4	6	0	+3

Hat-trick scorers

- Michael Grabner (AUT)
- Phil Kessel (USA)
- Jeff Carter (CAN)

=== Leading goaltenders ===
Goalkeepers with 40% or more of their team's total minutes, ranked by save percentage.

Rank	Goaltender	Minutes	GA	GAA	SV%	Saves	SO
1	Carey Price (CAN)	302:32	3	0.59	.972	103	2
2	Jonas Hiller (SUI)	179:09	2	0.67	.971	66	2
3	Sergei Bobrovsky (RUS)	157:12	3	1.15	.952	60	1
4	Mathias Lange (AUT)	139:38	4	1.72	.952	80	0
5	Edgars Masaļskis (LAT)	179:52	6	2.00	.946	105	0

Shutout posters

- Jonas Hiller (SUI) (2)
- Henrik Lundqvist (SWE) (2)
- Carey Price (CAN) (2)
- Sergei Bobrovsky (RUS)
- Robert Kristan (SLO)
- Roberto Luongo (CAN)
- Tuukka Rask (FIN)
- Semyon Varlamov (RUS)

=== Awards ===
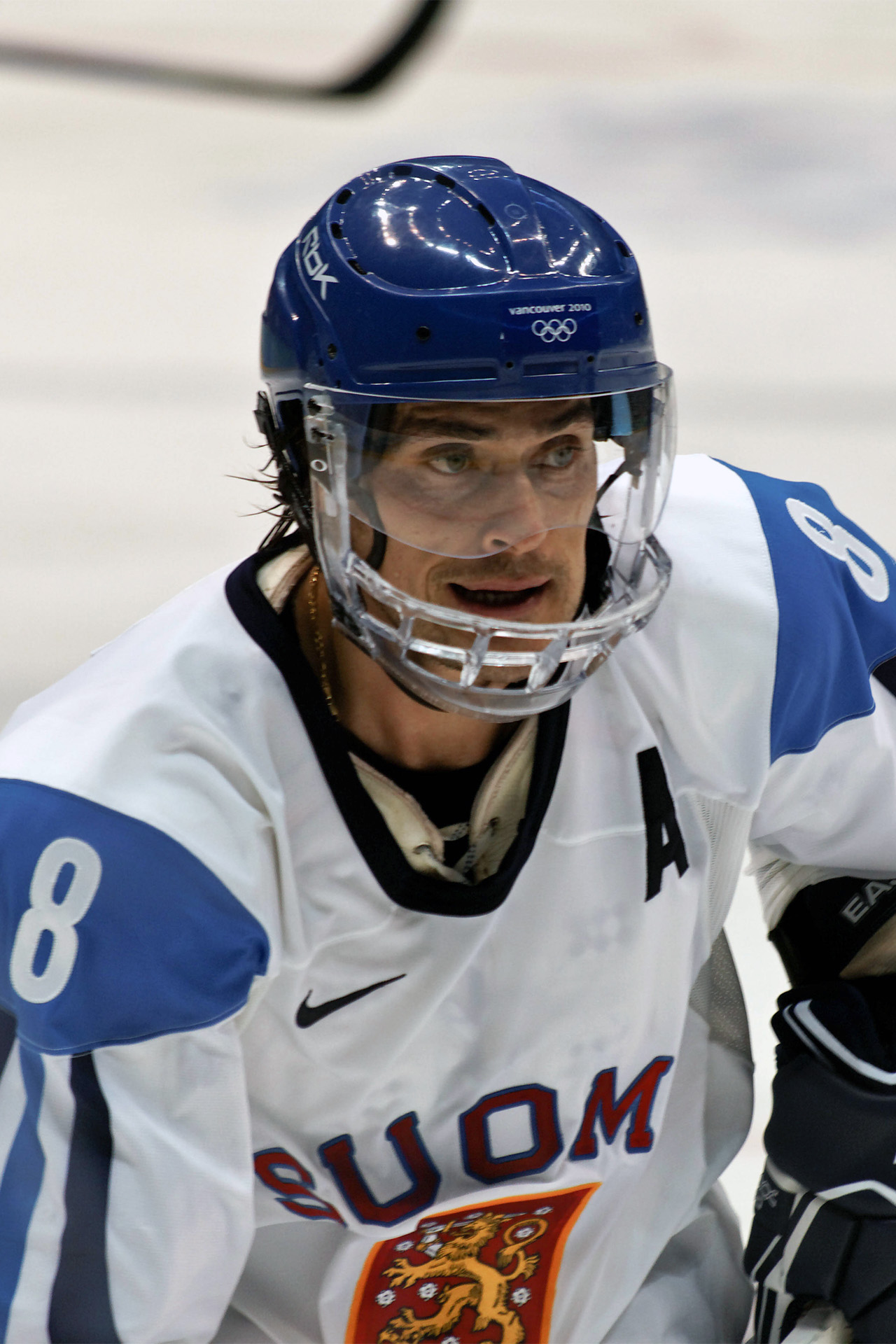
The Finnish national team and Anaheim Ducks' player Teemu Selänne was selected as the MVP of the tournament.

Most valuable player	Teemu Selänne	Finland
Best goaltender	Carey Price	Canada
Best defenseman	Erik Karlsson	Sweden
Best forward	Phil Kessel	United States

Source: IIHF.com

=== Tournament all-star team ===
Position	Player	Team
G	Henrik Lundqvist	Sweden
D	Erik Karlsson	Sweden
D	Drew Doughty	Canada
F	Teemu Selänne	Finland
F	Phil Kessel	United States
F	Mikael Granlund	Finland
