= Ian Walsh =

Ian Walsh is the name of:

- Ian Walsh (rugby league) (1933–2013), Australian former rugby league footballer and coach
- Ian Walsh (Fair City character), character in soap opera Fair City
- Ian Walsh (footballer) (born 1958), former Wales international footballer
- Ian Walsh (ice hockey) (born 1972), National Hockey League referee
