= Lonnie Cameron =

Canadian ice hockey official

- Born: July 15, 1964 (age 60); Victoria, British Columbia, Canada
- Position: Linesman

Lonnie Cameron (born July 15, 1964) is a Canadian retired National Hockey League linesman, who wears uniform number #74. He has worked more than 1500 NHL games including the NHL All-Star Game and the Stanley Cup Playoffs. He was selected to work games in the men's ice hockey tournament at the 2014 Winter Olympics in Sochi.
