= Brad Meier =

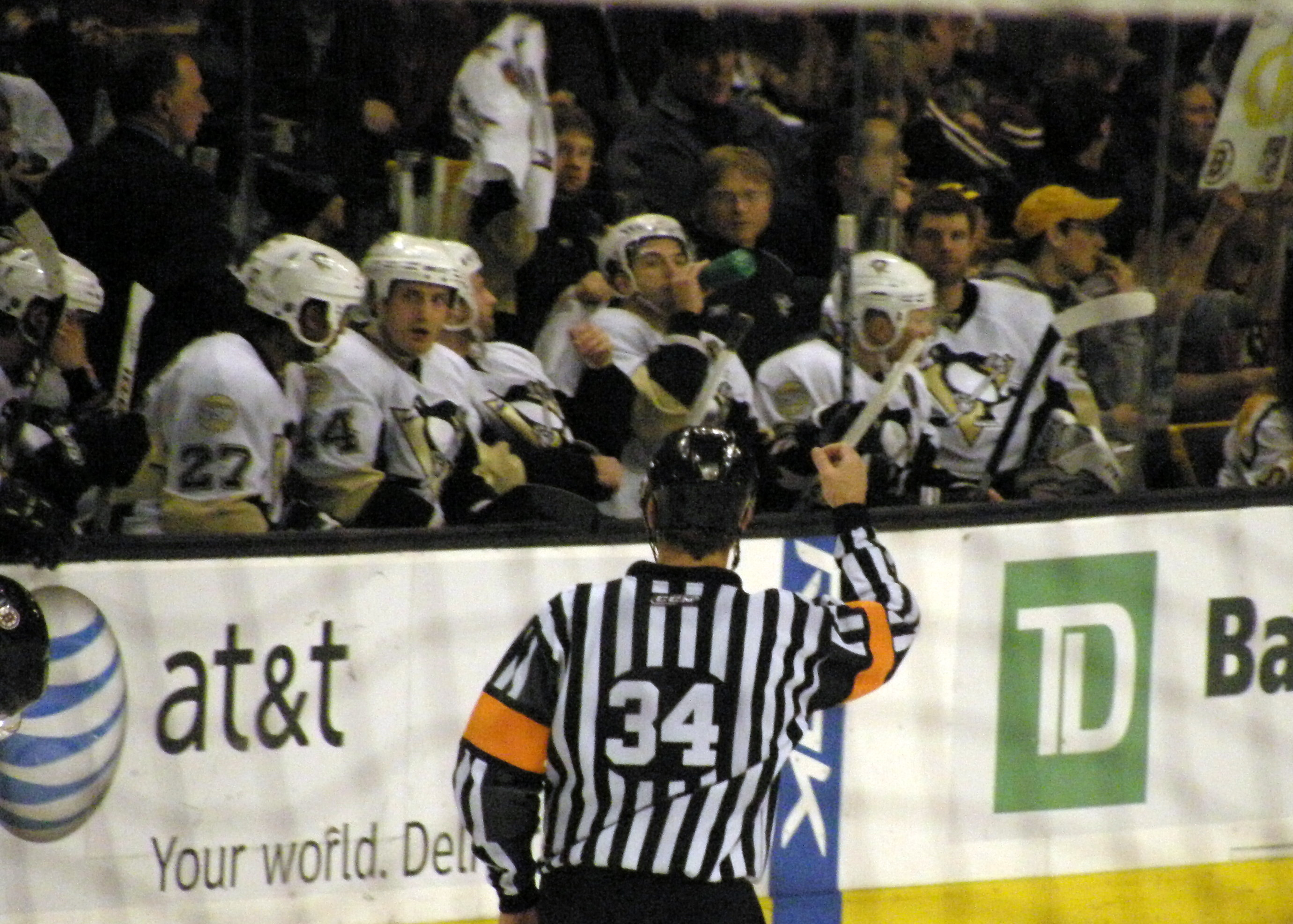
- Meier in 2008
- Born: Brad Meier; April 11, 1967 (age 59); Dayton, Ohio, U.S.
- Occupation: NHL referee

Brad Meier (born April 11, 1967, in Dayton, Ohio) was a National Hockey League (NHL) referee, who wore uniform number 34. Meier's first game as an NHL official was in the 1999–2000 NHL season. Meier was officiating on December 8, 2009, when Martin Brodeur tied Terry Sawchuk's career shutout record with his 103rd shutout.

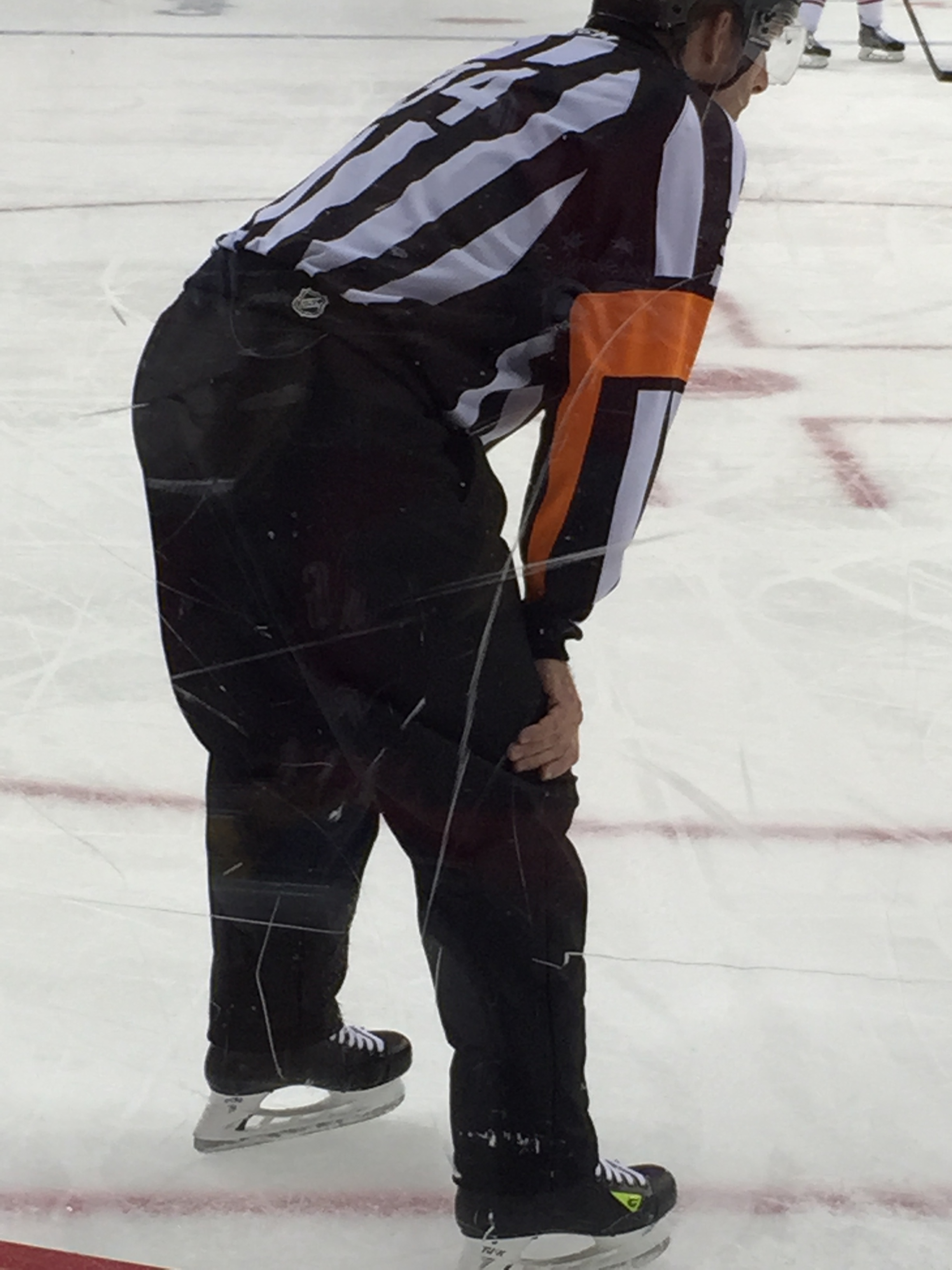
Brad Meier in 2014 - Coyotes @ Capitals

Meier, along with Marc Joannette, was selected to officiate the 57th National Hockey League All-Star Game in January 2009. He was selected to work games in the ice hockey men's tournament at the 2014 Winter Olympics in Sochi, Russia.

His final season officiating was the 2021-2022 NHL season. Meier officiated the Minnesota Wild and the New York Rangers game on March 8, 2022, and was congratulated by both teams at the conclusion of the game on his many seasons, although it was not his final game.

His final game was a game between the Arizona Coyotes and the Calgary Flames on April 16, 2022, where both teams at the conclusion of the game congratulated him.
