= Lauri Korpikoski =

Finnish ice hockey player (born 1986)

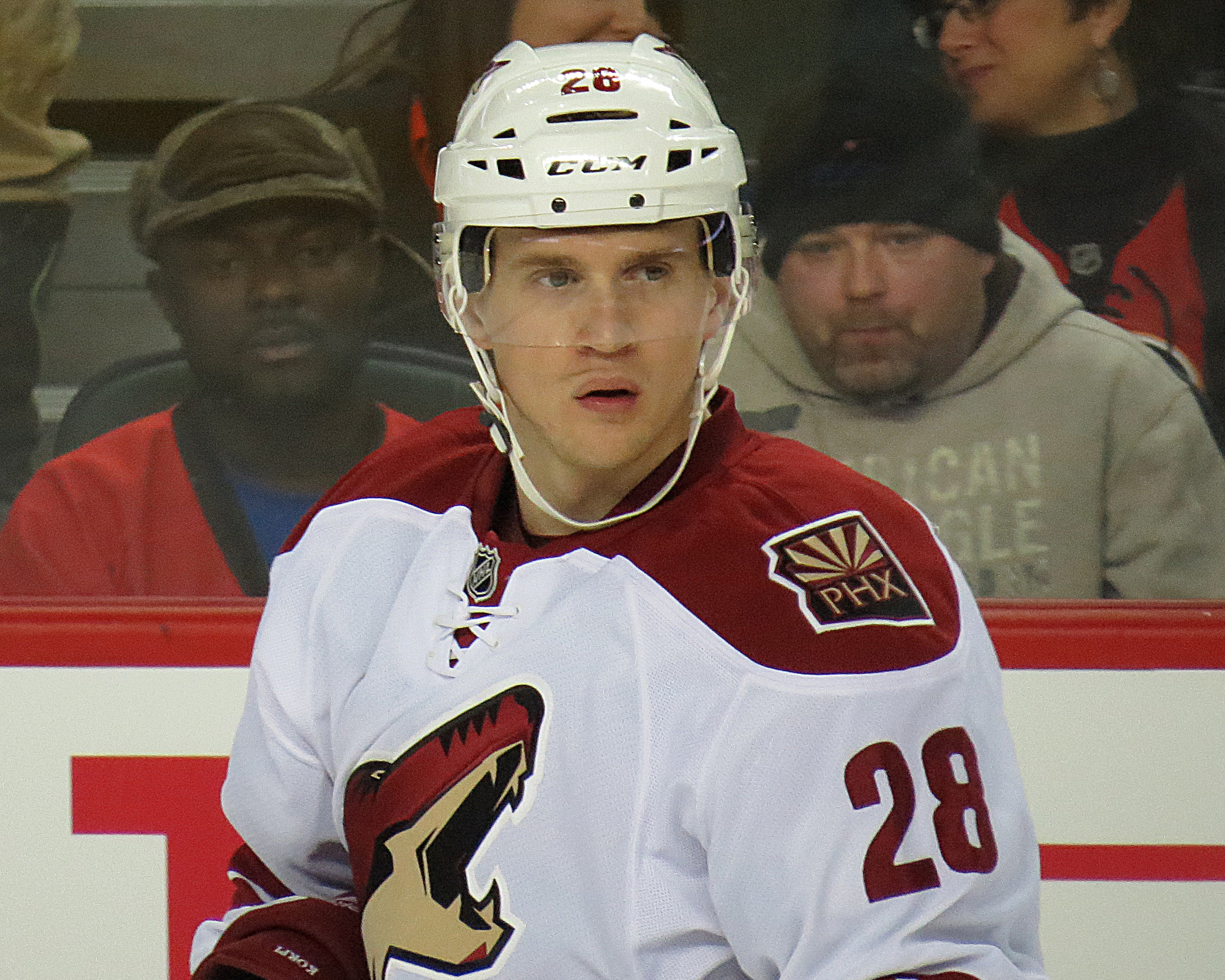
- Korpikoski with the Arizona Coyotes in 2014
- Born: 28 July 1986 (age 40) Turku, Finland
- Height: 6 ft 1 in (185 cm)
- Weight: 205 lb (93 kg; 14 st 9 lb)
- Position: Left wing
- Shoots: Left
- Liiga team Former teams: HC TPS; New York Rangers; Arizona Coyotes; Edmonton Oilers; Dallas Stars; Columbus Blue Jackets; ZSC Lions; EHC Biel
- National team: Finland
- NHL draft: 19th overall, 2004; New York Rangers
- Playing career: 2004–present

Lauri Korpikoski (born 28 July 1986) is a Finnish professional ice hockey left winger who is currently playing for HC TPS of the Liiga. Korpikoski has previously played in the NHL for the Arizona Coyotes, Edmonton Oilers, Dallas Stars, Columbus Blue Jackets and the New York Rangers, the organization that drafted him in the first round, 19th overall, at the 2004 NHL entry draft.

== Playing career ==
Korpikoski was drafted in the first round, 19th overall, in the 2004 NHL entry draft by the New York Rangers. He originally played for TPS' junior team in the SM-liiga before moving up to the main team for the 2004–05 season. He then played two seasons of professional hockey in Finland before joining the Rangers' American Hockey League (AHL) affiliate, the Hartford Wolf Pack, after TPS' 2005–06 season; he played five regular season games and 11 playoff games for Hartford for the team's 2005–06 season.

In 2006–07, Korpikoski had 11 goals and 38 points for the Wolf Pack, while in 2007–08, in his second year with the team, he bested his previous year's totals, scoring 23 goals and having 50 points, also scoring two points in five Calder Cup playoff games. Following Hartford's first-round exit from the playoffs, Korpikoski was named to the Rangers' reserves squad for the team's 2008 Stanley Cup playoff run. On 4 May, he dressed for Game 5 of the Eastern Conference Semifinals against the Pittsburgh Penguins, and 2:03 into the game's third period, he scored his first career NHL goal on just his second-ever shot. The goal brought the Rangers to within one goal of tying (which they did), although the team eventually lost in overtime, eliminating them from the playoffs.

After scoring points in every pre-season game in which he played, Korpikoski survived cuts to make the Rangers' 23-man roster for the start of the 2008–09 season, the only rookie to make the team. He later scored his first career regular season NHL goal against Kevin Weekes of the New Jersey Devils on 12 November 2008.

On 13 July 2009, Korpikoski was traded to the Phoenix Coyotes in exchange for Enver Lisin. On 11 July 2013, the Coyotes re-signed Korpikoski to a four-year contract extension.

On 30 June 2015, with two seasons left on his contract, Korpikoski was traded by the rebuilding Coyotes to the Edmonton Oilers in exchange for Boyd Gordon. He scored his first career NHL hat trick on 11 December 2015 against the New York Rangers.

After only one year in Edmonton, on 30 June 2016, Korpikoski was placed on unconditional waivers by the Oilers for the purpose of buying out the final year of his contract.

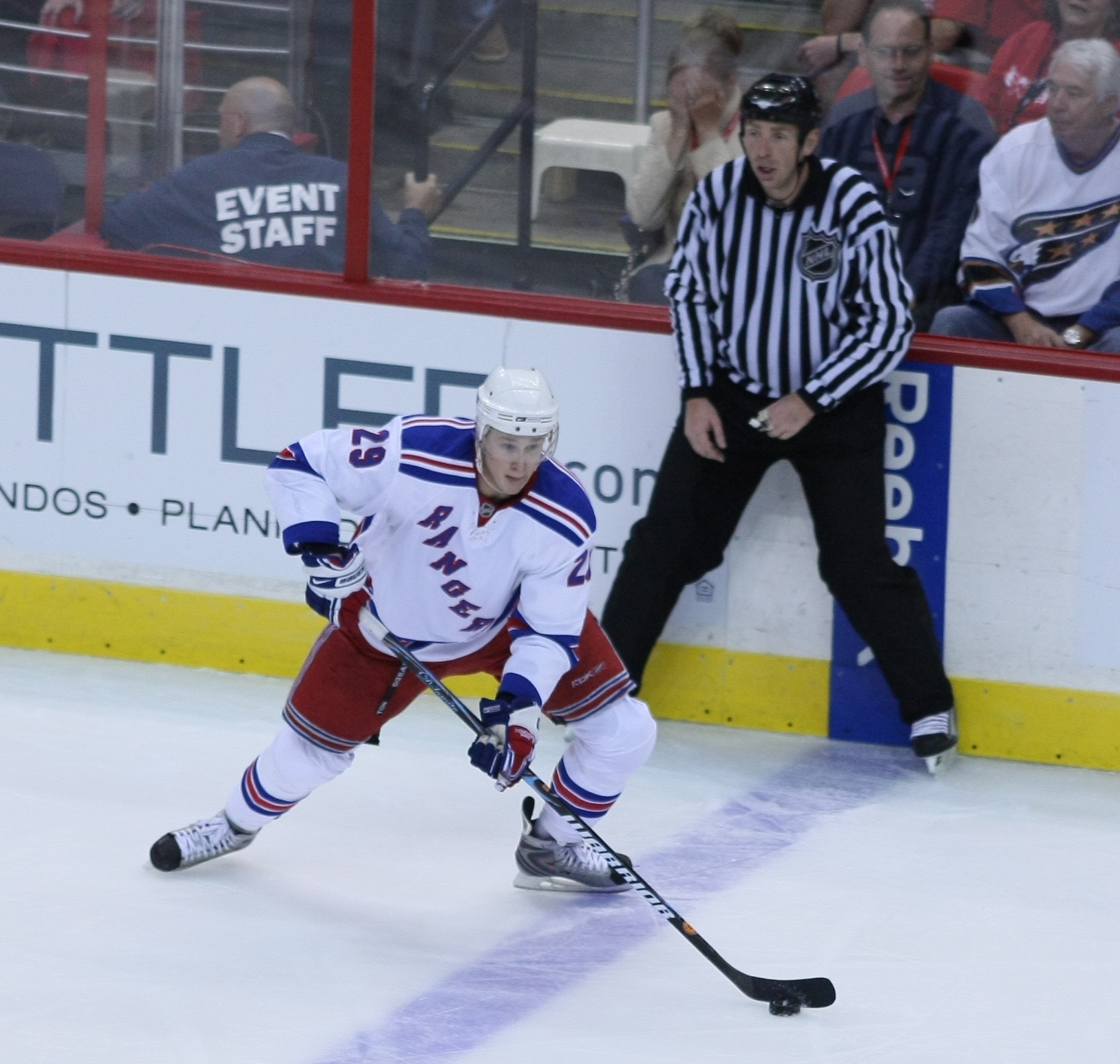
Korpikoski during his tenure with the New York Rangers

Before the start of the 2016–17 season, the Calgary Flames signed Korpikoski to a professional try-out contract to attend training camp on 22 September 2016. Despite a successful pre-season with the Flames, Korpikoski was without a contract with the Flames. On 9 October, he was released at his request to pursue a contract offer. The following day he signed a one-year, $1 million contract with the Dallas Stars. Korpokoski cemented his role within the Stars checking lines, scoring 8 goals and 20 points in 60 games before he was dealt with the Stars out of post-season contention, to the Columbus Blue Jackets in exchange for Dillon Heatherington on 1 March 2017.

After ending his NHL career as an unsigned free agent, Korpikoski joined Swiss club ZSC Lions of the National League for the duration of the 2017–18 season. In helping the Lions capture the Swiss championship, Korpikoski produced 2 goals and 6 points in 16 post-season games.

Korpikoski left Switzerland after one season and opted to return to his native Finland, securing a long-term 6-year contract with his former club, HC TPS of the Liiga, on May 21, 2018.

== Career statistics ==
=== Regular season and playoffs ===
			Regular season					Playoffs
Season	Team	League	GP	G	A	Pts	PIM	GP	G	A	Pts	PIM
2002–03	TPS	FIN U18	21	7	4	11	10	—	—	—	—	—
2003–04	TPS	FIN U20	36	12	8	20	20	4	0	2	2	4
2003–04	TPS	FIN U18	—	—	—	—	—	4	5	3	8	16
2004–05	TPS	FIN U20	3	3	0	3	0	—	—	—	—	—
2004–05	TPS	SM-l	41	0	6	6	12	6	1	0	1	0
2005–06	TPS	FIN U20	1	1	0	1	2	—	—	—	—	—
2005–06	TPS	SM-l	51	3	4	7	16	2	0	1	1	0
2005–06	Hartford Wolf Pack	AHL	5	2	1	3	0	11	1	0	1	2
2006–07	Hartford Wolf Pack	AHL	78	11	27	38	23	7	0	0	0	0
2007–08	Hartford Wolf Pack	AHL	79	23	27	50	71	5	1	1	2	0
2007–08	New York Rangers	NHL	—	—	—	—	—	1	1	0	1	0
2008–09	New York Rangers	NHL	68	6	8	14	14	7	0	2	2	0
2008–09	Hartford Wolf Pack	AHL	4	4	2	6	0	—	—	—	—	—
2009–10	Phoenix Coyotes	NHL	71	5	6	11	16	7	1	0	1	2
2010–11	Phoenix Coyotes	NHL	79	19	21	40	20	4	0	1	1	2
2011–12	Phoenix Coyotes	NHL	82	17	20	37	14	11	0	0	0	2
2012–13	TPS	SM-l	11	6	11	17	10	—	—	—	—	—
2012–13	Phoenix Coyotes	NHL	36	6	5	11	12	—	—	—	—	—
2013–14	Phoenix Coyotes	NHL	64	9	16	25	24	—	—	—	—	—
2014–15	Arizona Coyotes	NHL	69	6	15	21	12	—	—	—	—	—
2015–16	Edmonton Oilers	NHL	71	10	12	22	10	—	—	—	—	—
2016–17	Dallas Stars	NHL	60	8	12	20	10	—	—	—	—	—
2016–17	Columbus Blue Jackets	NHL	9	0	0	0	0	—	—	—	—	—
2017–18	ZSC Lions	NL	19	2	6	8	6	16	2	4	6	4
2018–19	TPS	Liiga	4	0	0	0	2	3	0	0	0	0
2019–20	TPS	Liiga	48	17	16	33	28	—	—	—	—	—
2020–21	TPS	Liiga	18	4	13	17	16	—	—	—	—	—
2021–22	EHC Biel	NL	11	0	1	1	12	1	0	0	0	0
2022–23	TPS	Liiga	43	11	13	24	8	–	–	—	—	—
Liiga totals			216	41	63	104	92	11	1	1	2	0
NHL totals			609	86	115	201	132	30	2	3	5	6

=== International ===
Medal record

Ice hockey

Representing Finland

Olympic Games
Bronze medal – third place	2014 Sochi	

World Junior Championships
Bronze medal – third place	2006 British Columbia	

Year	Team	Event	Result	GP	G	A	Pts	PIM
2004	Finland	WJC18	7th	6	5	6	11	2
2005	Finland	WJC	5th	5	2	0	2	6
2006	Finland	WJC	3rd place, bronze medalist(s)	7	1	5	6	4
2010	Finland	WC	6th	7	0	0	0	0
2013	Finland	WC	4th	8	3	2	5	4
2014	Finland	OG	3rd place, bronze medalist(s)	6	2	2	4	2
2016	Finland	WCH	8th	3	0	0	0	4
Junior totals				18	8	11	19	12
Senior totals				24	5	4	9	10

Awards and achievements
Preceded by Al Montoya	New York Rangers first-round draft pick 2004	Succeeded by Marc Staal
