= Kevin Pollock =

Canadian ice hockey official

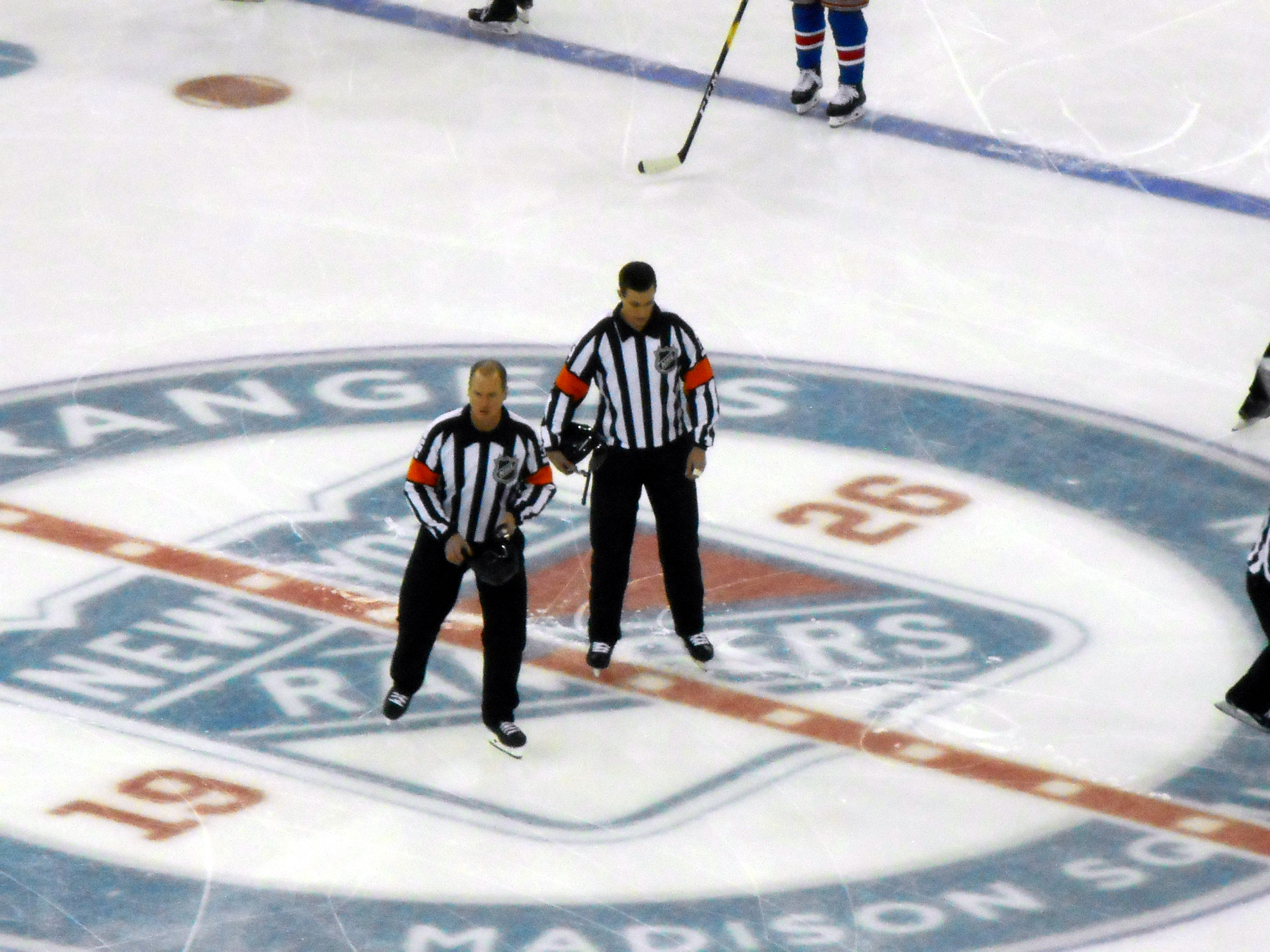
- Pollock (left) in 2020
- Born: February 7, 1970 (age 56); Kincardine, Ontario, Canada
- Occupation: Ice hockey referee

Kevin Pollock (born February 7, 1970) is a retired Canadian ice hockey official. He worked in the National Hockey League from the 1999–2000 NHL season until the 2023–24 NHL season, and officiated in ice hockey at the 2014 Winter Olympics – Men's tournament.

== Early life and family ==
Kevin Pollock was born on February 7, 1970, in Kincardine, Ontario. As a junior ice hockey player, Pollock won an Ontario Hockey Association (OHA) championship with the Hanover Barons in 1991. He later officiated in the OHA before working in the NHL. His granduncle Lloyd Pollock was a founder of the original Windsor Spitfires junior team, and later served as president of the OHA and the Canadian Amateur Hockey Association. Kevin and his father Clarke Pollock, are the namesakes of the Pollock Division in the Provincial Junior Hockey League.

== Refereeing career ==
Pollock (upper right) officiates as the referee in Game 7 of the 2017 Stanley Cup playoffs.

Pollock has been a National Hockey League referee since the 1999–2000 NHL season, and wears uniform number 33. He was selected to work games in the ice hockey men's tournament at the 2014 Winter Olympics in Sochi, Russia, and in the 2015 Stanley Cup Finals. He refereed game 6 of the 2017 Stanley Cup Finals, with the Pittsburgh Penguins winning the game and ultimately the Stanley Cup. Other notable games include the 2003 Heritage Classic game between the Edmonton Oilers and Montreal Canadiens, the 2004 World Cup of Hockey, and the 2011 National Hockey League All-Star Game.

During a game on February 19, 2024, Pollock sustained a career ending knee injury after being slid into by Buffalo Sabres forward Jordan Greenway. Pollock had planned to retire at the conclusion of the 2023–24 season. He worked 1,608 regular season games which led active officials at the time, and 219 playoff games.
