= Derek Amell =

Canadian ice hockey official

- Born: Derek Amell; September 16, 1968 (age 57); Port Colborne, Ontario
- Occupation: NHL official

Derek Amell (born September 16, 1968 in Port Colborne, Ontario) is a National Hockey League linesman, who wears uniform number 75. He was one of the selected linesman who officiated the 2009, 2012, 2014, 2015, 2016, 2018, 2019, and 2020 Stanley Cup Final. He was selected to work games in the ice hockey men's tournament at the 2014 Winter Olympics in Sochi, Russia.
