= Brad Kovachik =

Canadian ice hockey official

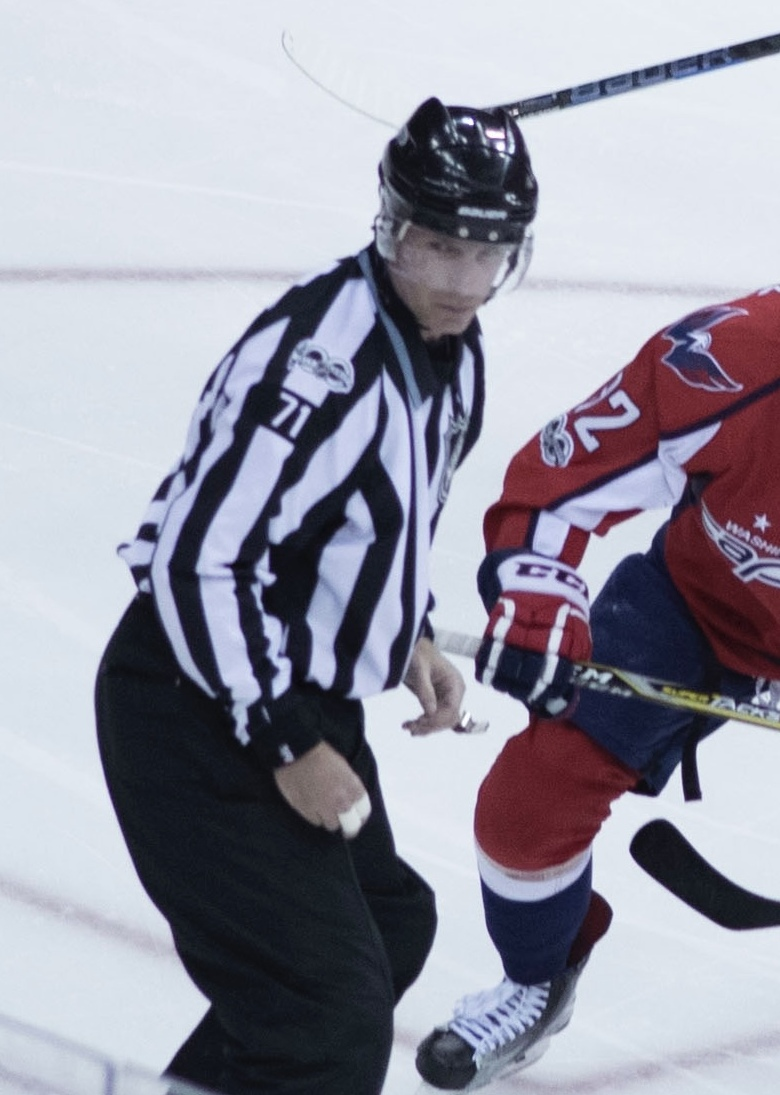
- Kovachik during the 2017 Stanley Cup playoffs
- Born: 1971 or 1972 (age 54–55); Woodstock, Ontario, Canada
- Occupation: Ice hockey linesman
- Years active: 1996–present
- Employer: National Hockey League

Brad Kovachik is a Canadian ice hockey linesman currently officiating in the National Hockey League. He made his debut during the 1996–97 NHL season, and has worked 1,836 regular season games and 200 playoff games as of the start of the 2024–25 season. Kovachik has made five appearances in the Stanley Cup Final and wears uniform number 71. He has also worked a Memorial Cup, and was selected to officiate ice hockey in the 2014 Winter Olympics.

== Early life ==
Kovachik was born and raised in Woodstock, Ontario, where he started officiating while playing minor hockey at age 12. He played with the Provincial Junior Hockey League’s Woodstock Navy Vets from 1989 to 1992, and was hired as a linesman for the Ontario Hockey League following his final season of junior hockey. He spent three seasons in the OHL, and worked the 1996 Memorial Cup final in Peterborough. His performance caught the attention of the NHL, and he signed a minor league contract that summer.

== Career ==
Kovachik made his NHL debut on October 10, 1996, for a game between the Los Angeles Kings and the Philadelphia Flyers. Joining the young linesman at the CoreStates Center was Ron Asselstine and referee Stephen Walkom. A memorable game for him was his first time officiating the Boston Bruins. He was a fan growing up, and was awestruck being on the ice with his childhood idol Ray Bourque.

Kovachik was promoted to a full time official for the 1997–98 season, and worked his first playoff game on April 14, 2001. That game was the second of the Western Conference quarterfinal between the Dallas Stars and Edmonton Oilers. He would work his first Stanley Cup Final thirteen years later, in 2014. Before then, he was assigned to the 2004 World Cup of Hockey, the 2008 Winter Classic, the 2012 All-Star Game, and he officiated the 2014 Olympic men's ice hockey tournament in Sochi, Russia.

Since 2014, Kovachik has officiated in the 2017, 2020, 2022, and 2023 Stanley Cup Final, as well as the 2017 Stadium Series. He was under consideration for the 2015 Stanley Cup Final, but suffered a knee injury during the Eastern Conference finals. He marked his 1,500th NHL game on March 1, 2019, at the KeyBank Center between the Pittsburgh Penguins and the Buffalo Sabres. (Note: The game was actually Kovachik’s 1,504th, as he requested to delay the recognition until the upcoming Sabres home game. His 1,500th game was on February 21, between the Ottawa Senators and the New Jersey Devils.) Commenting on the milestone, then Edmonton Oilers head coach Ken Hitchcock noted that Kovachik was "one of the best" and that "when he calls a game, you know it is going to be under control."

In October 2025, the Greater Ontario Hockey League announced he had been hired as their referee in chief.

== Personal life ==
Kovachik lives in Fort Erie, Ontario.

== See also ==
- List of NHL on-ice officials
