= Lars Haugen =

Norwegian ice hockey player (born 1987)

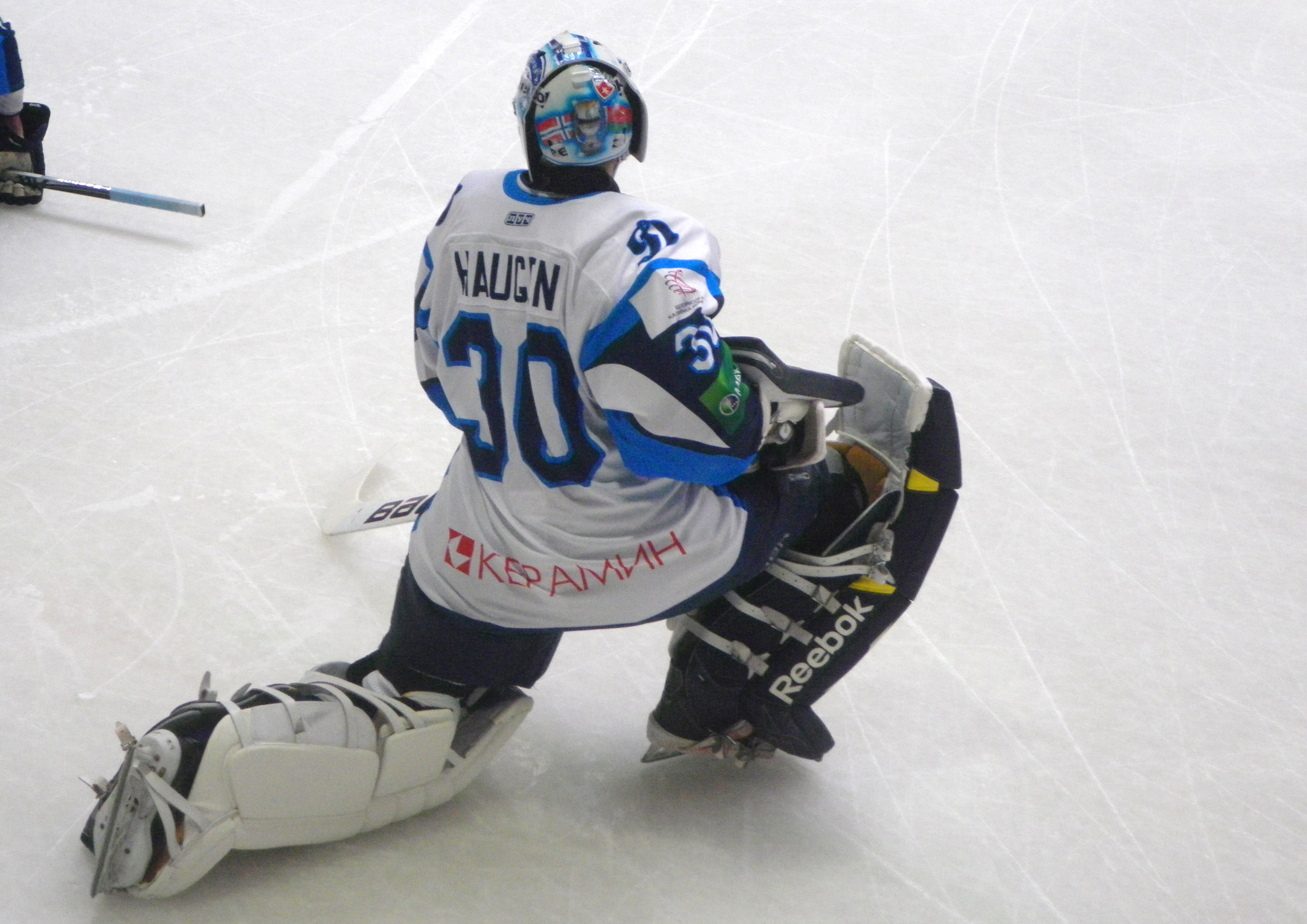
- Born: 19 March 1987 (age 39) Oslo, Norway
- Height: 6 ft 0 in (183 cm)
- Weight: 183 lb (83 kg; 13 st 1 lb)
- Position: Goaltender
- Catches: Left
- team Former teams: Free Agent; Lørenskog IK; Sparta Warriors; Manglerud Star; Dinamo Minsk; Färjestad BK; EC KAC
- National team: Norway
- Playing career: 2006–present

Lars Haugen (born 19 March 1987) is a former Norwegian professional ice hockey goaltender who most recently played with Manglerud Star in the Eliteserien.

== Playing career ==
He started out as a youth product of Vålerenga, before moving to play junior hockey in Manglerud Star and Leksand. In 2006 he signed his first professional contract with Sparta Warriors of GET-ligaen, where he played three seasons before moving to Lørenskog. Near the end of the 2010–11 GET-ligaen season, he was loaned out to Manglerud Star, helping them to secure a place in the 2011–12 GET-ligaen season. During his first season in the KHL (2011–2012) he only appeared in two regular season games and one playoff game for the HC Dinamo Minsk team.

== International play ==
He participated at the 2011 IIHF World Championship as a member of the Norway men's national ice hockey team. On 30 April 2011 he debuted in goal for the national team in their first ever win over Sweden After helping Norway to reach the quarter final 2011 IIHF World Championship, HC Dinamo Minsk signed him on a two-year contract because of his great statistics in the tournament.

On 7 January 2014 he was named to Team Norway's official 2014 Winter Olympics roster.
