= Lars Brüggemann =

German ice hockey player

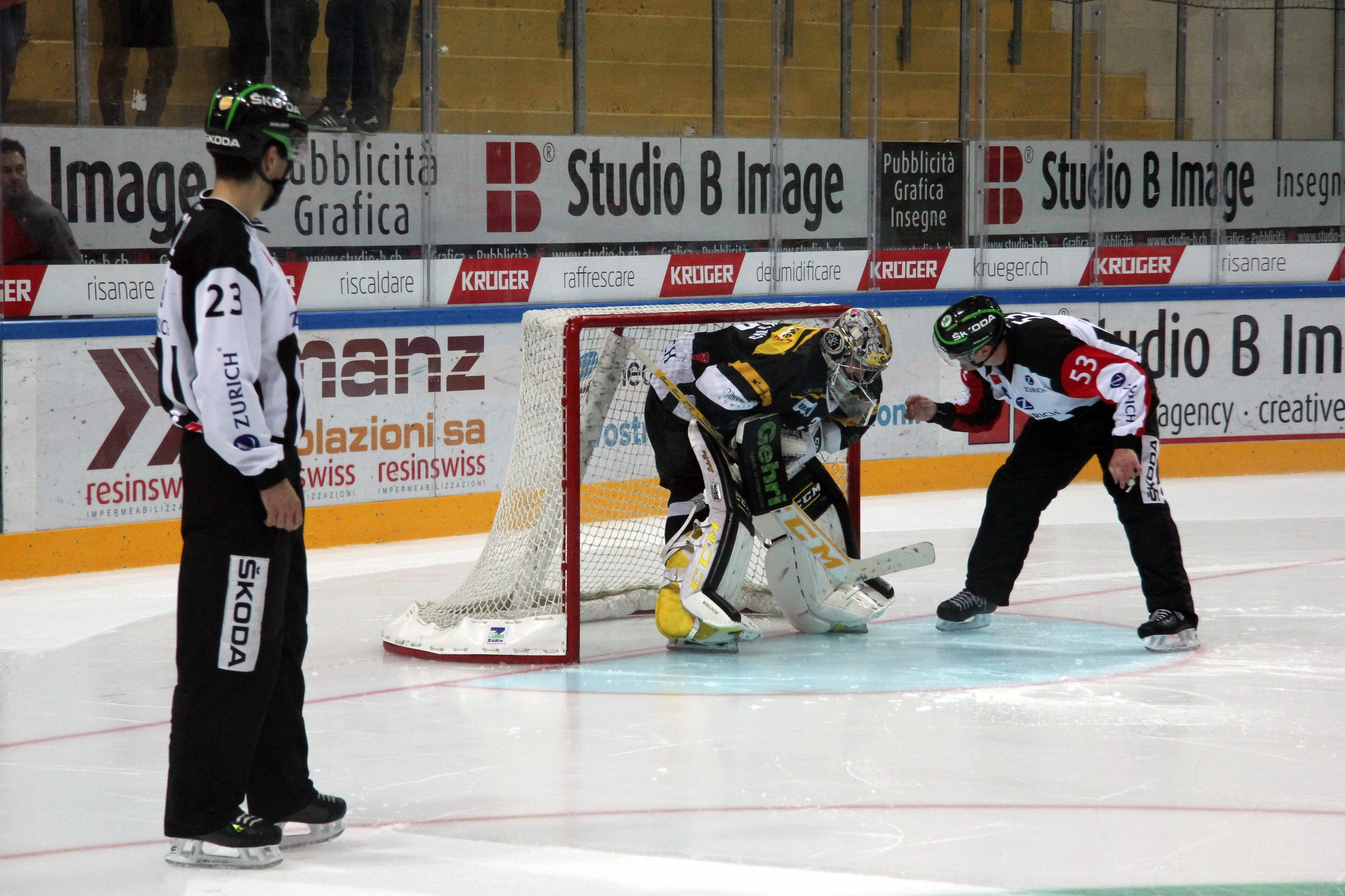
- Brüggemann (right) as a referee

Personal information
- Nationality: German
- Born: 2 March 1976 (age 49); Hemer, Germany

Sport
- Sport: Ice hockey

Lars Brüggemann (born 2 March 1976) is a German ice hockey player. He competed in the men's tournament at the 1998 Winter Olympics.
