= Ian Walsh (ice hockey) =

American ice hockey official

- Born: May 9, 1972 (age 54); Philadelphia, Pennsylvania, U.S.
- Occupation: Ice hockey referee
- Years active: 2000–2023
- Employer: National Hockey League

Ian Walsh (born May 9, 1972) is a retired American ice hockey referee. He worked in the National Hockey League from the 2000–01 NHL season to the end of the 2022–23 season, officiating 1,321 regular season games and 30 Stanley Cup playoff games. He wore uniform number 29.

== Early life ==
Walsh was born in Philadelphia in 1972 and started officiating ice hockey in the Philadelphia metropolitan area at age 15.

== Career ==
Walsh has also worked as an official in the United States Hockey League and the ECHL. His first NHL game was a matchup between the New Jersey Devils and the Anaheim Ducks on October 14, 2000. He worked his first NHL playoff game between the Detroit Red Wings and the Columbus Blue Jackets on April 16, 2009. Walsh's 1,000th game officiated occurred on October 21, 2017, between the Philadelphia Flyers and Edmonton Oilers.
