= 2004 World Cup of Hockey rosters =

Listed below are the rosters for the eight teams participating in the 2004 World Cup of Hockey. Players who held NHL contracts are listed by the team they were signed too during the 2004-05 lockout. Footnotes detail teams they played for during the lockout.

== Canada ==
Canada's roster was announced on May 15, 2004.

Head coach: Pat Quinn

Assistant coaches: Wayne Fleming, Ken Hitchcock, Jacques Martin

No.	Pos.	Name	Height	Weight	Birthdate	2004-05 Team
30	G	Martin Brodeur	6 ft 2 in (188 cm)	220 lb (100 kg)	May 6, 1972 (aged 32)	(United States) New Jersey Devils
1	G	Roberto Luongo	6 ft 3 in (191 cm)	216 lb (98 kg)	April 4, 1979 (aged 25)	(United States) Florida Panthers
60	G	José Théodore	5 ft 11 in (180 cm)	172 lb (78 kg)	September 13, 1976 (aged 28)	(Canada) Montreal Canadiens (Note: Played for Djurgårdens IF during the 2004-05 NHL lockout)
3	D	Jay Bouwmeester	6 ft 4 in (193 cm)	204 lb (93 kg)	September 7, 1983 (aged 21)	(United States) Florida Panthers (Note: Played for 64 games for the San Antonio Rampage, Florida's AHL affiliate, and 18 games on loan for the Chicago Wolves)
2	D	Eric Brewer	6 ft 4 in (193 cm)	216 lb (98 kg)	April 17, 1979 (aged 25)	(Canada) Edmonton Oilers
52	D	Adam Foote	6 ft 2 in (188 cm)	216 lb (98 kg)	July 10, 1971 (aged 33)	(United States) Colorado Avalanche
22	D	Scott Hannan	6 ft 1 in (185 cm)	216 lb (98 kg)	January 23, 1979 (aged 25)	(United States) San Jose Sharks
55	D	Ed Jovanovski	6 ft 3 in (191 cm)	220 lb (100 kg)	June 26, 1976 (aged 28)	(Canada) Vancouver Canucks
27	D	Scott Niedermayer (A)	6 ft 1 in (185 cm)	201 lb (91 kg)	August 31, 1973 (aged 31)	(United States) New Jersey Devils
6	D	Wade Redden	6 ft 2 in (188 cm)	209 lb (95 kg)	June 12, 1977 (aged 27)	(Canada) Ottawa Senators
28	D	Robyn Regehr	6 ft 3 in (191 cm)	225 lb (102 kg)	April 19, 1980 (aged 24)	(Canada) Calgary Flames
9	F	Shane Doan	6 ft 2 in (188 cm)	216 lb (98 kg)	October 10, 1976 (aged 27)	(United States) Phoenix Coyotes
33	F	Kris Draper	5 ft 10 in (178 cm)	190 lb (86 kg)	May 24, 1971 (aged 33)	(United States) Detroit Red Wings
21	F	Simon Gagné	6 ft 0 in (183 cm)	185 lb (84 kg)	February 29, 1980 (aged 24)	(United States) Philadelphia Flyers
15	F	Dany Heatley	6 ft 3 in (191 cm)	216 lb (98 kg)	January 21, 1981 (aged 23)	(United States) Atlanta Thrashers (Note: Played 16 games for SC Bern and 11 games for Ak Bars Kazan during the 2004-05 NHL lockout)
12	F	Jarome Iginla	6 ft 1 in (185 cm)	209 lb (95 kg)	July 1, 1977 (aged 27)	(Canada) Calgary Flames
4	F	Vincent Lecavalier	6 ft 4 in (193 cm)	205 lb (93 kg)	April 21, 1980 (aged 24)	(United States) Tampa Bay Lightning (Note: Played 30 games for Ak Bars Kazan during the 2004-05 NHL lockout)
66	F	Mario Lemieux (C)	6 ft 4 in (193 cm)	231 lb (105 kg)	October 5, 1965 (aged 38)	(United States) Pittsburgh Penguins
18	F	Kirk Maltby	6 ft 0 in (183 cm)	194 lb (88 kg)	December 22, 1972 (aged 31)	(United States) Detroit Red Wings
10	F	Brenden Morrow	5 ft 11 in (180 cm)	212 lb (96 kg)	January 16, 1979 (aged 25)	(United States) Dallas Stars (Note: Played 19 games for the Oklahoma City Blazers during the 2004-05 NHL lockout)
39	F	Brad Richards	6 ft 1 in (185 cm)	200 lb (91 kg)	May 2, 1980 (aged 24)	(United States) Tampa Bay Lightning (Note: Played six games for the Ak Bars Kazan during the 2004-05 NHL lockout)
91	F	Joe Sakic (A)	5 ft 11 in (180 cm)	194 lb (88 kg)	July 7, 1969 (aged 35)	(United States) Colorado Avalanche
94	F	Ryan Smyth	6 ft 1 in (185 cm)	190 lb (86 kg)	February 21, 1976 (aged 28)	(Canada) Edmonton Oilers
26	F	Martin St. Louis	5 ft 9 in (175 cm)	185 lb (84 kg)	June 18, 1975 (aged 29)	(United States) Tampa Bay Lightning (Note: Played 23 games for Lausanne HC during the 2004-05 NHL lockout)
97	F	Joe Thornton	6 ft 4 in (193 cm)	225 lb (102 kg)	July 2, 1979 (aged 25)	(United States) Boston Bruins (Note: Played 40 games for HC Davos during the 2004-05 NHL lockout)

== Czech Republic ==
Czech Republic's roster was announced on May 25, 2004.

Head coach: Vladimír Růžička

Assistant coach: Marian Jelínek, Radim Rulík, Ondrej Weissmann

No.	Pos.	Name	Height	Weight	Birthdate	2004-05 Team
32	G	Roman Čechmánek	6 ft 3 in (191 cm)	201 lb (91 kg)	March 2, 1971 (aged 33)	(United States) Los Angeles Kings (Note: Played 35 games for Vsetínska hokejová during the 2004-05 NHL lockout)
72	G	Petr Bříza	6 ft 0 in (183 cm)	181 lb (82 kg)	December 9, 1964 (aged 39)	(Czech Republic) HC Sparta Praha
29	G	Tomáš Vokoun	6 ft 0 in (183 cm)	216 lb (98 kg)	July 2, 1976 (aged 28)	(United States) Nashville Predators (Note: Played 27 games for HC Znojemštrí Orli and 19 games for HIFK during the 2004-05 NHL lockout)
2	D	Jiří Fischer	6 ft 5 in (196 cm)	229 lb (104 kg)	July 31, 1980 (aged 24)	(United States) Detroit Red Wings (Note: Played 27 games for Bílí Tygři Liberec and one game for HC Berounští Medvědi during the 2004-05 NHL lockout)
4	D	Roman Hamrlík	6 ft 1 in (185 cm)	207 lb (94 kg)	April 12, 1974 (aged 30)	(United States) New York Islanders (Note: Played 45 games for HC Hamé during the 2004-05 NHL lockout)
15	D	Tomáš Kaberle	6 ft 1 in (185 cm)	212 lb (96 kg)	March 2, 1978 (aged 26)	(Canada) Toronto Maple Leafs (Note: Played 49 games for HC Kladno during the 2004-05 NHL lockout)
8	D	Marek Malík	6 ft 4 in (193 cm)	236 lb (107 kg)	June 25, 1975 (aged 29)	(Canada) Vancouver Canucks (Note: Played 42 games for HC Vítkovice during the 2004-05 NHL lockout)
41	D	Martin Škoula	6 ft 3 in (191 cm)	223 lb (101 kg)	October 28, 1979 (aged 24)	(Czech Republic) HC Litvínov
71	D	Jiři Šlégr	6 ft 0 in (183 cm)	223 lb (101 kg)	May 30, 1971 (aged 33)	(Czech Republic) HC Chemopetrol
6	D	Jaroslav Špaček	5 ft 11 in (180 cm)	203 lb (92 kg)	February 11, 1974 (aged 30)	(United States) Columbus Blue Jackets (Note: Played 30 games for HC Plzeň and 17 games for HC Sparta Praha during the 2004-05 NHL lockout)
3	D	Marek Židlický	5 ft 10 in (178 cm)	190 lb (86 kg)	February 3, 1977 (aged 27)	(United States) Nashville Predators (Note: Played 49 games for HIFK during the 2004-05 NHL lockout)
16	F	Petr Čajánek	5 ft 11 in (180 cm)	185 lb (84 kg)	August 18, 1975 (aged 29)	(United States) St. Louis Blues (Note: Played 49 games for HC Hamé during the 2004-05 NHL lockout)
30	F	Jiří Dopita	6 ft 4 in (193 cm)	227 lb (103 kg)	December 2, 1968 (aged 35)	(Czech Republic) HC Pardubice
20	F	Radek Dvorák	6 ft 2 in (188 cm)	194 lb (88 kg)	March 9, 1977 (aged 27)	(Canada) Edmonton Oilers (Note: Played 32 games for HC České Budějovice during the 2004-05 NHL lockout)
26	F	Patrik Eliáš	6 ft 1 in (185 cm)	190 lb (86 kg)	April 13, 1976 (aged 28)	(United States) New Jersey Devils (Note: Played 28 games for HC Znojemštrí Orli and 17 games for Metallurg Magnitogorsk during the 2004-05 NHL lockout)
24	F	Martin Havlát	6 ft 2 in (188 cm)	209 lb (95 kg)	April 19, 1981 (aged 23)	(Canada) Ottawa Senators (Note: Played 12 games for HC Znojemštrí Orli, 10 games for Dynamo Moskva, and 9 games for HC Sparta Praha during the 2004-05 NHL lockout)
23	F	Milan Hejduk	6 ft 0 in (183 cm)	192 lb (87 kg)	February 14, 1976 (aged 28)	(United States) Colorado Avalanche (Note: Played 48 games for HC Pardubice during the 2004-05 NHL lockout)
68	F	Jaromír Jágr	6 ft 3 in (191 cm)	230 lb (100 kg)	February 15, 1972 (aged 32)	(United States) New York Rangers (Note: Played 17 games for HC Kladno and 32 games for Avangard Omsk during the 2004-05 NHL lockout)
20	F	Václav Prospal	6 ft 2 in (188 cm)	198 lb (90 kg)	February 17, 1975 (aged 29)	(United States) Mighty Ducks of Anaheim (Note: Played 39 games for HC České Budějovice during the 2004-05 NHL lockout)
21	F	Robert Reichel (C)	5 ft 10 in (178 cm)	183 lb (83 kg)	June 25, 1971 (aged 33)	(Czech Republic) HC Chemopetrol
26	F	Martin Ručinský	6 ft 2 in (188 cm)	209 lb (95 kg)	March 11, 1971 (aged 33)	(Czech Republic) HC Chemopetrol
28	F	Martin Straka	5 ft 9 in (175 cm)	174 lb (79 kg)	September 3, 1972 (aged 32)	(United States) Los Angeles Kings (Note: Played 45 games for HC Plzeň during the 2004-05 NHL lockout)
17	F	Petr Sýkora	6 ft 0 in (183 cm)	190 lb (86 kg)	November 19, 1976 (aged 27)	(United States) Mighty Ducks of Anaheim (Note: Played 45 games for Metallurg Magnitogorsk during the 2004-05 NHL lockout)
63	F	Josef Vašíček	6 ft 4 in (193 cm)	201 lb (91 kg)	September 12, 1980 (aged 24)	(United States) Carolina Hurricanes (Note: Played 52 games for HC Slavia Praha during the 2004-05 NHL lockout)
75	F	Tomáš Vlasák	5 ft 10 in (178 cm)	187 lb (85 kg)	February 1, 1975 (aged 29)	(Russia) Ak Bars Kazan (Note: Played 44 games for HC Slavia Praha)
9	F	David Výborný (A)	5 ft 10 in (178 cm)	183 lb (83 kg)	January 25, 1975 (aged 29)	(United States) Columbus Blue Jackets (Note: Played 51 games for HC Sparta Praha during the 2004-05 NHL lockout)

== Finland ==
Finland's roster was announced on May 25, 2004.

Head coach: Raimo Summanen

Assistant coaches: Timo Jutila, Jari Kurri, Hannu Viirlas, Erkka Westerlund

No.	Pos.	Name	Height	Weight	Birthdate	2004-05 Team
34	G	Miikka Kiprusoff	6 ft 1 in (185 cm)	183 lb (83 kg)	October 26, 1976 (aged 27)	(Canada) Calgary Flames (Note: Played 46 games for Timrå IK during the 2004-05 NHL lockout)
30	G	Kari Lehtonen	6 ft 4 in (193 cm)	209 lb (95 kg)	November 16, 1983 (aged 20)	(United States) Atlanta Thrashers (Note: Played 57 games for the Chicago Wolves during the 2004-05 NHL lockout)
35	G	Vesa Toskala	5 ft 10 in (178 cm)	187 lb (85 kg)	May 20, 1977 (aged 27)	(United States) San Jose Sharks (Note: Played three games for Ilves during the 2004-05 NHL lockout)
7	D	Aki Berg	6 ft 4 in (193 cm)	214 lb (97 kg)	July 28, 1977 (aged 27)	(Canada) Toronto Maple Leafs (Note: Played 47 games for Timrå IK during the 2004-05 NHL lockout)
32	D	Toni Lydman	6 ft 1 in (185 cm)	201 lb (91 kg)	September 25, 1977 (aged 26)	(Canada) Calgary Flames (Note: Played eight games for HIFK during the 2004-05 NHL lockout)
44	D	Janne Niinimaa	6 ft 1 in (185 cm)	220 lb (100 kg)	May 22, 1975 (aged 29)	(United States) New York Islanders (Note: Played 26 games for Kärpät and ten games for the Malmö Redhawks during the 2004-05 NHL lockout)
27	D	Teppo Numminen (A)	6 ft 1 in (185 cm)	198 lb (90 kg)	July 3, 1968 (aged 36)	Free agent
2	D	Joni Pitkänen	6 ft 3 in (191 cm)	209 lb (95 kg)	September 19, 1983 (aged 20)	(United States) Philadelphia Flyers (Note: Played 76 games for the Philadelphia Phantoms during the 2004-05 NHL lockout)
6	D	Sami Salo	6 ft 3 in (191 cm)	216 lb (98 kg)	March 22, 1974 (aged 30)	(Canada) Vancouver Canucks (Note: Played 41 games for Frölunda HC during the 2004-05 NHL lockout)
4	D	Kimmo Timonen	5 ft 10 in (178 cm)	194 lb (88 kg)	March 18, 1975 (aged 29)	(United States) Nashville Predators (Note: Played three games for HC Lugano, ten games for Brynäs IF, and 12 games for KalPa during the 2004-05 NHL lockout)
5	D	Ossi Väänänen	6 ft 4 in (193 cm)	216 lb (98 kg)	August 18, 1980 (aged 24)	(United States) Colorado Avalanche (Note: Played three 28 for Jokerit during the 2004-05 NHL lockout)
22	F	Mikko Eloranta	6 ft 0 in (183 cm)	190 lb (86 kg)	August 24, 1972 (aged 32)	(Switzerland) SC Rapperswil-Jona
9	F	Niklas Hagman	6 ft 0 in (183 cm)	205 lb (93 kg)	December 5, 1979 (aged 24)	(United States) Florida Panthers (Note: Played three 44 for HC Davos during the 2004-05 NHL lockout)
36	F	Riku Hahl	6 ft 0 in (183 cm)	205 lb (93 kg)	November 1, 1980 (aged 23)	(Finland) HPK
25	F	Jukka Hentunen	5 ft 10 in (178 cm)	198 lb (90 kg)	May 3, 1974 (aged 30)	(Switzerland) HC Fribourg-Gottéon
12	F	Olli Jokinen (A)	6 ft 2 in (188 cm)	209 lb (95 kg)	December 5, 1978 (aged 25)	(United States) Florida Panthers (Note: Played eight games for the Kloten Flyers, 23 games for Södertälje SK]], and 14 games for HIFK during the 2004-05 NHL lockout)
39	F	Niko Kapanen	5 ft 10 in (178 cm)	176 lb (80 kg)	April 29, 1978 (aged 26)	(United States) Dallas Stars (Note: Played 44 games for the HC Zug during the 2004-05 NHL lockout)
21	F	Mikko Koivu	6 ft 2 in (188 cm)	214 lb (97 kg)	March 12, 1983 (aged 21)	(United States) Houston Aeros
11	F	Saku Koivu (C)	5 ft 10 in (178 cm)	181 lb (82 kg)	November 23, 1974 (aged 29)	(Canada) Montreal Canadiens (Note: Played 20 games for TPS during the 2004-05 NHL lockout)
24	F	Antti Laaksonen	6 ft 0 in (183 cm)	181 lb (82 kg)	October 3, 1973 (aged 30)	Free agent
26	F	Jere Lehtinen	6 ft 0 in (183 cm)	194 lb (88 kg)	June 24, 1973 (aged 31)	(United States) Dallas Stars
10	F	Ville Nieminen	6 ft 0 in (183 cm)	207 lb (94 kg)	April 6, 1977 (aged 27)	(Canada) Calgary Flames (Note: Played 26 games for Tappara during the 2004-05 NHL lockout)
16	F	Ville Peltonen	5 ft 11 in (180 cm)	187 lb (85 kg)	March 24, 1973 (aged 31)	(Switzerland) HC Lugano
37	F	Jarkko Ruutu	6 ft 1 in (185 cm)	203 lb (92 kg)	August 23, 1975 (aged 29)	(Canada) Vancouver Canucks (Note: Played 50 games for HIFK during the 2004-05 NHL lockout)
15	F	Tuomo Ruutu	6 ft 0 in (183 cm)	201 lb (91 kg)	February 16, 1983 (aged 21)	(United States) Chicago Blackhawks
8	F	Teemu Selänne	6 ft 0 in (183 cm)	201 lb (91 kg)	July 3, 1970 (aged 34)	Free agent

== Germany ==
Germany's roster was announced on May 17, 2004.

Head coach: Franz Reindl

Assistant coaches: Bernhard Englbrecht, Ernst Höfner

No.	Pos.	Name	Height	Weight	Birthdate	2004-05 Team
1	G	Oliver Jonas	6 ft 0 in (183 cm)	176 lb (80 kg)	May 14, 1979 (aged 25)	(Germany) Eisbären Berlin
37	G	Olaf Kölzig	6 ft 3 in (191 cm)	225 lb (102 kg)	April 6, 1970 (aged 34)	(United States) Washington Capitals (Note: Played eight games for Eisbären Berlin during the 2004-05 NHL lockout)
80	G	Robert Müller	5 ft 8 in (173 cm)	187 lb (85 kg)	June 25, 1980 (aged 24)	(Germany) Krefeld Pinguine
10	D	Christian Ehrhoff	6 ft 2 in (188 cm)	201 lb (91 kg)	July 6, 1982 (aged 22)	(United States) San Jose Sharks (Note: Played 79 games for the Cleveland Barons, San Jose's AHL affiliate, during the 2004-05 NHL lockout)
7	D	Sashca Goc	6 ft 2 in (188 cm)	227 lb (103 kg)	April 14, 1979 (aged 25)	(Germany) Adler Mannheim
58	D	Lasse Kopitz	6 ft 3 in (191 cm)	198 lb (90 kg)	May 29, 1980 (aged 24)	(Germany) Nürnberg Ice Tigers
5	D	Robert Leask	6 ft 2 in (188 cm)	205 lb (93 kg)	June 9, 1971 (aged 33)	(Germany) Eisbären Berlin
12	D	Mirko Lüdermann (A)	5 ft 11 in (180 cm)	192 lb (87 kg)	December 15, 1973 (aged 30)	(Germany) Kölner Haie
31	D	Andreas Renz	6 ft 0 in (183 cm)	207 lb (94 kg)	June 12, 1977 (aged 27)	(Germany) Kölner Haie
76	D	Stephan Retzer	6 ft 0 in (183 cm)	194 lb (88 kg)	October 11, 1975 (aged 28)	(Germany) Kassel Huskies
13	D	Christoph Schubert	6 ft 3 in (191 cm)	236 lb (107 kg)	February 5, 1982 (aged 22)	(United States) Binghamton Senators
84	D	Dennis Seidenberg (A)	6 ft 0 in (183 cm)	198 lb (90 kg)	June 18, 1981 (aged 23)	(United States) Philadelphia Flyers (Note: Played 79 games for the Philadelphia Phantoms, the Flyers' AHL affiliate, during the 2004-05 NHL lockout)
27	F	Tobias Abstreiter	5 ft 9 in (175 cm)	185 lb (84 kg)	July 6, 1970 (aged 34)	(Germany) Kassel Huskies
73	F	Tino Boos	6 ft 0 in (183 cm)	187 lb (85 kg)	April 10, 1975 (aged 29)	(Germany) Kölner Haie
72	F	Petr Fical	5 ft 10 in (178 cm)	181 lb (82 kg)	September 23, 1977 (aged 26)	(Germany) Nürnberg Ice Tigers
57	F	Marcel Goc	6 ft 0 in (183 cm)	203 lb (92 kg)	August 24, 1983 (aged 21)	(United States) San Jose Sharks (Note: Played 76 games for the Cleveland Barons, San Jose's AHL affiliate, during the 2004-05 NHL lockout)
17	F	Jochen Hecht	6 ft 1 in (185 cm)	192 lb (87 kg)	June 21, 1977 (aged 27)	(United States) Buffalo Sabres (Note: Played 48 games for Adler Mannheim during the 2004-05 NHL lockout)
49	F	Klaus Kathan	6 ft 0 in (183 cm)	187 lb (85 kg)	January 7, 1977 (aged 27)	(Germany) DEG Metro Stars
26	F	Daniel Kreutzer	5 ft 9 in (175 cm)	192 lb (87 kg)	October 23, 1979 (aged 24)	(Germany) DEG Metro Stars
34	F	Eduard Lewandowski	6 ft 2 in (188 cm)	203 lb (92 kg)	September 7, 1980 (aged 24)	(Germany) Kölner Haie
32	F	Tomas Martinec	6 ft 0 in (183 cm)	190 lb (86 kg)	March 5, 1976 (aged 28)	(Germany) Nürnberg Ice Tigers
22	F	Martin Reichel	6 ft 2 in (188 cm)	190 lb (86 kg)	November 7, 1973 (aged 30)	(Germany) Frankfurt Lions
19	F	Marco Sturm (C)	5 ft 11 in (180 cm)	194 lb (88 kg)	September 8, 1978 (aged 26)	(United States) San Jose Sharks (Note: Played 45 games for ERC Ingolstadt during the 2004-05 NHL lockout)
21	F	Stefan Ustorf	5 ft 11 in (180 cm)	194 lb (88 kg)	January 3, 1974 (aged 30)	(Germany) Eisbären Berlin

== Russia ==
Russia's roster was announced on May 31, 2004.

Head coach: Zinetula Bilyaletdinov

Assistant coaches: Anatoli Bukatin, Vladimir Yurzinov

No.	Pos.	Name	Height	Weight	Birthdate	2004-05 Team
30	G	Ilya Bryzgalov	6 ft 2 in (188 cm)	194 lb (88 kg)	June 22, 1980 (aged 24)	(United States) Mighty Ducks of Anaheim (Note: Played 36 games for the Cincinnati Mighty Ducks, Anaheim's AHL affiliate, during the 2004-05 NHL lockout)
35	G	Alexander Fomichev	5 ft 10 in (178 cm)	181 lb (82 kg)	February 19, 1979 (aged 25)	(Russia) CSKA Moskva (Note: Played five games for CSKA Moskva-2)
39	G	Maxim Sokolov	6 ft 0 in (183 cm)	181 lb (82 kg)	May 27, 1979 (aged 25)	(Russia) Avangard Omsk (Note: Played one games for the Omskie Yastreby, Avangard Omsk's MHL affiliate)
55	D	Sergei Gonchar	6 ft 2 in (188 cm)	209 lb (95 kg)	April 13, 1974 (aged 30)	(United States) Boston Bruins (Note: Played 40 games for Metallurg Magnitogorsk during the 2004-05 NHL lockout)
45	D	Dmitri Kalinin	6 ft 3 in (191 cm)	216 lb (98 kg)	June 22, 1980 (aged 24)	(United States) Buffalo Sabres (Note: Played 48 games for Metallurg Magnitogorsk during the 2004-05 NHL lockout)
11	D	Darius Kasparaitis (A)	5 ft 11 in (180 cm)	218 lb (99 kg)	October 16, 1972 (aged 31)	(United States) New York Rangers (Note: Played 29 games for Ak Bars Kazan during the 2004-05 NHL lockout)
29	D	Alexander Khavanov	6 ft 1 in (185 cm)	198 lb (90 kg)	January 30, 1972 (aged 32)	(United States) St. Louis Blues (Note: Played three games for SKA St. Petersburg during the 2004-05 NHL lockout)
32	D	Andrei Markov	6 ft 0 in (183 cm)	198 lb (90 kg)	December 20, 1978 (aged 25)	(Canada) Montreal Canadiens (Note: Played 42 games for Dynamo Moskva during the 2004-05 NHL lockout)
10	D	Oleg Tverdovsky	6 ft 0 in (183 cm)	203 lb (92 kg)	May 18, 1976 (aged 28)	(Russia) Avangard Omsk
5	D	Vitaly Vishnevskiy	6 ft 2 in (188 cm)	203 lb (92 kg)	March 18, 1980 (aged 24)	(United States) Mighty Ducks of Anaheim (Note: Played 51 games for Khimik Voskresensk during the 2004-05 NHL lockout)
6	D	Anton Volchenkov	6 ft 1 in (185 cm)	225 lb (102 kg)	February 25, 1982 (aged 22)	(Canada) Ottawa Senators (Note: Played 69 games for Binghamton Senators, Ottawa's AHL affiliate, during the 2004-05 NHL lockout)
22	F	Dmitry Afanasenkov	5 ft 8 in (173 cm)	176 lb (80 kg)	May 12, 1980 (aged 24)	(United States) Tampa Bay Lightning (Note: Played 30 games for Lada Togliatti during the 2004-05 NHL lockout)
61	F	Maxim Afinogenov	6 ft 0 in (183 cm)	194 lb (88 kg)	September 4, 1979 (aged 25)	(United States) Buffalo Sabres (Note: Played 36 games for Dynamo Moskva during the 2004-05 NHL lockout)
31	F	Artem Chubarov	6 ft 1 in (185 cm)	203 lb (92 kg)	December 13, 1979 (aged 24)	(Russia) Dynamo Moskva
13	F	Pavel Datsyuk	5 ft 10 in (178 cm)	190 lb (86 kg)	July 20, 1978 (aged 26)	(United States) Detroit Red Wings (Note: Played 47 games for Dynamo Moskva during the 2004-05 NHL lockout)
24	F	Alexander Frolov	6 ft 2 in (188 cm)	209 lb (95 kg)	June 19, 1982 (aged 22)	(United States) Los Angeles Kings (Note: Played 42 games for CSKA Moskva and six games for Dynamo Moskva during the 2004-05 NHL lockout)
71	F	Ilya Kovalchuk	6 ft 2 in (188 cm)	218 lb (99 kg)	April 15, 1983 (aged 21)	(United States) Atlanta Thrashers (Note: Played 53 games for Ak Bars Kazan during the 2004-05 NHL lockout)
51	F	Andrei Kovalenko	6 ft 1 in (185 cm)	190 lb (86 kg)	June 7, 1970 (aged 34)	(Russia) Lokomotiv Yaroslavl (Note: Played seven games for Lokomotiv Yaroslavl-2 and 33 games for Avangard Omsk)
27	F	Alexei Kovalev (C)	6 ft 2 in (188 cm)	225 lb (102 kg)	February 24, 1973 (aged 31)	(Canada) Montreal Canadiens (Note: Played 35 games for Ak Bars Kazan during the 2004-05 NHL lockout)
25	F	Viktor Kozlov	6 ft 5 in (196 cm)	229 lb (104 kg)	February 14, 1975 (aged 29)	(United States) New Jersey Devils (Note: Played 52 games for Lada Togliatti during the 2004-05 NHL lockout)
12	F	Oleg Kvasha	6 ft 5 in (196 cm)	240 lb (110 kg)	July 26, 1978 (aged 26)	(United States) New York Islanders (Note: Played 22 games for Severstal Cherepovets and 26 games for CSKA Moskva during the 2004-05 NHL lockout)
8	F	Alexander Ovechkin	6 ft 2 in (188 cm)	216 lb (98 kg)	October 17, 1985 (aged 18)	(United States) Washington Capitals (Note: Played 37 games for Dynamo Moskva during the 2004-05 NHL lockout)
15	F	Oleg Petrov	5 ft 10 in (178 cm)	179 lb (81 kg)	April 18, 1971 (aged 33)	(Switzerland) EV Zug
14	F	Sergei Samsonov	5 ft 9 in (175 cm)	185 lb (84 kg)	October 27, 1978 (aged 25)	(United States) Boston Bruins (Note: Played three games for Dynamo Moskva during the 2004-05 NHL lockout)
19	F	Alexei Yashin (A)	6 ft 3 in (191 cm)	220 lb (100 kg)	November 5, 1973 (aged 30)	(United States) New York Islanders (Note: Played ten games for Lokomotiv Yaroslavl during the 2004-05 NHL lockout)
9	F	Danius Zubrus	6 ft 4 in (193 cm)	209 lb (95 kg)	June 16, 1978 (aged 26)	(United States) Washington Capitals (Note: Played 42 games for Lada Togliatti during the 2004-05 NHL lockout)

== Slovakia ==
Slovakia's roster was announced on May 19, 2004.

Head coach: Ján Filc

Assistant coaches: František Hossa, Lubomir Pokovic

No.	Pos.	Name	Height	Weight	Birthdate	2004-05 Team
37	G	Peter Budaj	6 ft 1 in (185 cm)	196 lb (89 kg)	September 18, 1982 (aged 21)	(United States) Hershey Bears
25	G	Ján Lašák	6 ft 0 in (183 cm)	205 lb (93 kg)	April 10, 1979 (aged 25)	(Czech Republic) HC Pardubice
31	G	Rastislav Staňa	6 ft 1 in (185 cm)	198 lb (90 kg)	January 10, 1980 (aged 24)	(Sweden) Södertälje SK
3	D	Zdeno Chára	6 ft 9 in (206 cm)	249 lb (113 kg)	March 18, 1977 (aged 27)	(Canada) Ottawa Senators (Note: Played 33 games for Färjestad BK during the 2004-05 NHL lockout)
74	D	Ladislav Čierny	6 ft 0 in (183 cm)	187 lb (85 kg)	November 3, 1974 (aged 29)	(Slovakia) HKM Zvolen
41	D	Richard Lintner	6 ft 3 in (191 cm)	214 lb (97 kg)	November 15, 1977 (aged 26)	(Switzerland) HC Fribourg-Gottéron
2	D	Branislav Mezei	6 ft 4 in (193 cm)	229 lb (104 kg)	October 8, 1980 (aged 23)	(United States) Florida Panthers (Note: Played 41 games for HC Oceláři Třinec and 10 games for HK Dukla Trencin during the 2004-05 NHL lockout)
43	D	Jaroslav Obšut	6 ft 1 in (185 cm)	209 lb (95 kg)	September 3, 1976 (aged 28)	(Sweden) Luleå HF
7	D	Martin Štrbák	6 ft 3 in (191 cm)	212 lb (96 kg)	January 15, 1975 (aged 29)	(Slovakia) HC Košice (Note: Played 36 games for CSKA Moskva)
6	D	Radoslav Suchý	6 ft 2 in (188 cm)	205 lb (93 kg)	April 7, 1976 (aged 28)	(United States) Columbus Blue Jackets (Note: Played 34 games for HK SKP Poprad during the 2004-05 NHL lockout)
17	D	Ľubomír Višňovský	5 ft 10 in (178 cm)	192 lb (87 kg)	August 11, 1976 (aged 28)	(United States) Los Angeles Kings (Note: Played 43 games for HC Slovan Bratislava during the 2004-05 NHL lockout)
23	F	Ľuboš Bartečko	6 ft 0 in (183 cm)	201 lb (91 kg)	July 14, 1976 (aged 28)	(Russia) Dynamo Moskva
8	F	Martin Cibák	6 ft 1 in (185 cm)	196 lb (89 kg)	May 17, 1980 (aged 24)	(United States) Tampa Bay Lightning (Note: Played four games for HK 32 Liptovsky Mikulas, 30 games for HC Plzeň, and sx games for HC Kosice]] during the 2004-05 NHL lockout)
38	F	Pavol Demitra (A)	6 ft 0 in (183 cm)	205 lb (93 kg)	November 29, 1974 (aged 29)	(Slovakia) HK Dukla Trenčín
10	F	Marián Gáborík	6 ft 1 in (185 cm)	201 lb (91 kg)	February 14, 1982 (aged 22)	(United States) Minnesota Wild (Note: Played 29 games for HK Dukla Trencin and 12 games for Färjestad BK during the 2004-05 NHL lockout)
30	F	Miroslav Hlinka	6 ft 2 in (188 cm)	209 lb (95 kg)	August 30, 1972 (aged 32)	(Slovakia) HK Dukla Trenčín (Note: Played 16 games for MsHK Zilina)
81	F	Marián Hossa	6 ft 2 in (188 cm)	207 lb (94 kg)	January 12, 1979 (aged 25)	(Canada) Ottawa Senators (Note: Played 25 games for HK Dukla Trencin and 24 games for Mora IK during the 2004-05 NHL lockout)
27	F	Ladislav Nagy	5 ft 10 in (178 cm)	192 lb (87 kg)	June 1, 1979 (aged 25)	(United States) Phoenix Coyotes (Note: Played 18 games for HC Kosice and 19 games for Mora IK during the 2004-05 NHL lockout)
16	F	Vladimír Országh	5 ft 11 in (180 cm)	190 lb (86 kg)	May 24, 1977 (aged 27)	(United States) Nashville Predators (Note: Played 37 games for HKM Zvolen and two games for SaHK Banská Bystrica during the 2004-05 NHL lockout)
82	F	Rastislav Pavlikovský	5 ft 11 in (180 cm)	198 lb (90 kg)	March 2, 1977 (aged 27)	(Sweden) Mora IK
19	F	Branko Radivojevič	6 ft 2 in (188 cm)	205 lb (93 kg)	November 24, 1980 (aged 23)	(United States) Philadelphia Flyers (Note: Played 32 games for Vsetínská Hokejová and ten games for Luleå HF during the 2004-05 NHL lockout)
18	F	Miroslav Šatan (C)	6 ft 2 in (188 cm)	194 lb (88 kg)	October 22, 1974 (aged 29)	(United States) Buffalo Sabres (Note: Played 18 games for HC Slovan Bratislava during the 2004-05 NHL lockout)
21	F	Radovan Somík	6 ft 3 in (191 cm)	198 lb (90 kg)	May 5, 1977 (aged 27)	(United States) Philadelphia Flyers (Note: Played two games for MHC Martin, 31 games for Vsetínská Hokejová, and eight games for the Malmö Redhawks during the 2004-05 NHL lockout)
15	F	Jozef Stümpel (A)	6 ft 3 in (191 cm)	218 lb (99 kg)	July 20, 1972 (aged 32)	(Czech Republic) HC Slavia Praha
20	F	Richard Zedník	6 ft 0 in (183 cm)	192 lb (87 kg)	January 6, 1976 (aged 28)	(Canada) Montreal Canadiens (Note: Played 36 games for HKM Zvolen during the 2004-05 NHL lockout)

== Sweden ==
Sweden's roster was announced on May 17, 2004.

Head coach: Hardy Nilsson

Assistant coaches: Ulf Dahlén, Johan Garpenlöv

No.	Pos.	Name	Height	Weight	Birthdate	2004-05 Team
30	G	Henrik Lundqvist	6 ft 1 in (185 cm)	181 lb (82 kg)	March 2, 1982 (aged 22)	(Sweden) Frölunda HC
35	G	Tommy Salo	6 ft 0 in (183 cm)	179 lb (81 kg)	February 1, 1971 (aged 33)	(Sweden) MODO Hockey
32	G	Mikael Tellqvist	6 ft 0 in (183 cm)	190 lb (86 kg)	September 19, 1979 (aged 24)	(Canada) Toronto Maple Leafs (Note: Played 45 games for the St. John's Maple Leafs during the 2004-05 NHL lockout)
8	D	Christian Bäckman	6 ft 4 in (193 cm)	209 lb (95 kg)	April 28, 1980 (aged 24)	(United States) St. Louis Blues (Note: Played 50 games for Frölunda HC during the 2004-05 NHL lockout)
3	D	Kim Johnsson	6 ft 1 in (185 cm)	205 lb (93 kg)	March 16, 1976 (aged 28)	(United States) Philadelphia Flyers (Note: Played 24 games for HC Ambrì-Piotta during the 2004-05 NHL lockout)
5	D	Nicklas Lidström (A)	6 ft 1 in (185 cm)	190 lb (86 kg)	April 28, 1970 (aged 34)	(United States) Detroit Red Wings
14	D	Mattias Norström	6 ft 1 in (185 cm)	223 lb (101 kg)	January 2, 1972 (aged 32)	(United States) Los Angeles Kings (Note: Played eight games for AIK during the 2004-05 NHL lockout)
17	D	Marcus Ragnarsson	6 ft 1 in (185 cm)	216 lb (98 kg)	August 13, 1971 (aged 33)	(United States) Philadelphia Flyers (Note: Played one game for Almtuna IS during the 2004-05 NHL lockout)
34	D	Daniel Tjärnqvist	6 ft 2 in (188 cm)	201 lb (91 kg)	October 14, 1976 (aged 27)	(United States) Atlanta Thrashers (Note: Played 49 games for Djurgårdens IF during the 2004-05 NHL lockout)
6	D	Dick Tärnström	6 ft 1 in (185 cm)	205 lb (93 kg)	January 20, 1975 (aged 29)	(United States) Pittsburgh Penguins (Note: Played 50 games for Södertälje SK during the 2004-05 NHL lockout)
2	D	Mattias Öhlund	6 ft 4 in (193 cm)	234 lb (106 kg)	September 9, 1976 (aged 28)	(Canada) Vancouver Canucks (Note: Played two games for Luleå HF during the 2004-05 NHL lockout)
11	F	Daniel Alfredsson	6 ft 0 in (183 cm)	203 lb (92 kg)	December 11, 1972 (aged 31)	(Canada) Ottawa Senators (Note: Played 15 games for Frölunda HC during the 2004-05 NHL lockout)
22	F	P.J. Axelsson	6 ft 1 in (185 cm)	190 lb (86 kg)	February 26, 1975 (aged 29)	(United States) Boston Bruins (Note: Played 45 games for Frölunda HC during the 2004-05 NHL lockout)
29	F	Nils Ekman	6 ft 0 in (183 cm)	185 lb (84 kg)	May 11, 1976 (aged 28)	(United States) San Jose Sharks (Note: Played 44 games for Djurgårdens IF during the 2004-05 NHL lockout)
21	F	Peter Forsberg (A)	6 ft 1 in (185 cm)	205 lb (93 kg)	July 20, 1973 (aged 31)	(United States) Colorado Avalanche (Note: Played 33 games for MODO Hockey during the 2004-05 NHL lockout)
96	F	Tomas Holmström	6 ft 0 in (183 cm)	198 lb (90 kg)	January 23, 1973 (aged 31)	(United States) Detroit Red Wings (Note: Played 47 games for Luleå HF during the 2004-05 NHL lockout)
10	F	Andreas Johansson	6 ft 0 in (183 cm)	205 lb (93 kg)	May 19, 1973 (aged 31)	(Switzerland) Genève-Servette HC
72	F	Jörgen Jönsson	6 ft 0 in (183 cm)	192 lb (87 kg)	September 29, 1972 (aged 31)	(Sweden) Färjestad BK
33	F	Frederik Modin	6 ft 4 in (193 cm)	220 lb (100 kg)	October 8, 1974 (aged 29)	(United States) Tampa Bay Lightning (Note: Played 43 games for Timrå IK during the 2004-05 NHL lockout)
18	F	Marcus Nilson	6 ft 2 in (188 cm)	196 lb (89 kg)	March 1, 1978 (aged 26)	(Canada) Calgary Flames (Note: Played 48 games for Djurgårdens IF during the 2004-05 NHL lockout)
19	F	Markus Näslund	6 ft 0 in (183 cm)	196 lb (89 kg)	July 30, 1973 (aged 31)	(Canada) Vancouver Canucks (Note: Played 13 games for MODO Hockey during the 2004-05 NHL lockout)
26	F	Samuel Påhlsson	6 ft 0 in (183 cm)	212 lb (96 kg)	December 17, 1977 (aged 26)	(United States) Mighty Ducks of Anaheim (Note: Played 48 games for Frölunda HC during the 2004-05 NHL lockout)
12	F	Daniel Sedin	6 ft 1 in (185 cm)	190 lb (86 kg)	September 26, 1980 (aged 23)	(Canada) Vancouver Canucks (Note: Played 49 games for MODO Hockey during the 2004-05 NHL lockout)
20	F	Henrik Sedin	6 ft 2 in (188 cm)	183 lb (83 kg)	September 26, 1980 (aged 23)	(Canada) Vancouver Canucks (Note: Played 44 games for MODO Hockey during the 2004-05 NHL lockout)
13	F	Mats Sundin (C)	6 ft 5 in (196 cm)	231 lb (105 kg)	February 13, 1971 (aged 33)	(Canada) Toronto Maple Leafs
40	F	Henrik Zetterberg	6 ft 0 in (183 cm)	196 lb (89 kg)	October 9, 1980 (aged 23)	(United States) Detroit Red Wings (Note: Played 50 games for Timrå IK during the 2004-05 NHL lockout)

== United States ==
The United States' roster was announced on May 20, 2004.

Head coach: Ron Wilson

Assistant coaches: Tim Army, Peter Laviolette, Barry Smith

No.	Pos.	Name	Height	Weight	Birthdate	2004-05 Team
30	G	Ty Conklin	6 ft 0 in (183 cm)	183 lb (83 kg)	March 30, 1976 (aged 28)	(Canada) Edmonton Oilers (Note: Played 11 games for Grizzly Adams Wolfsburg during the 2004-05 NHL lockout)
29	G	Rick DiPietro	6 ft 1 in (185 cm)	209 lb (95 kg)	September 19, 1981 (aged 22)	(United States) New York Islanders
42	G	Robert Esche	6 ft 2 in (188 cm)	203 lb (92 kg)	January 22, 1978 (aged 26)	(United States) Philadelphia Flyers
24	D	Chris Chelios (C)	5 ft 11 in (180 cm)	191 lb (87 kg)	January 25, 1962 (aged 42)	(United States) Motor City Mechanics
20	D	Ken Klee	6 ft 1 in (185 cm)	216 lb (98 kg)	April 24, 1971 (aged 33)	(Canada) Toronto Maple Leafs
2	D	Brian Leetch (A)	6 ft 1 in (185 cm)	187 lb (85 kg)	March 3, 1968 (aged 36)	(Canada) Toronto Maple Leafs
4	D	Jordan Leopold	6 ft 1 in (185 cm)	205 lb (93 kg)	August 3, 1980 (aged 24)	(Canada) Calgary Flames
26	D	John-Michael Liles	5 ft 10 in (178 cm)	185 lb (84 kg)	November 25, 1980 (aged 23)	(United States) Colorado Avalanche (Note: Played 17 games for the Iserlohn Roosters during the 2004-05 NHL lockout)
10	D	Paul Martin	6 ft 1 in (185 cm)	201 lb (91 kg)	March 5, 1981 (aged 23)	(United States) New Jersey Devils (Note: Played 11 games for HC Fribourg-Gottéron during the 2004-05 NHL lockout)
3	D	Aaron Miller	6 ft 3 in (191 cm)	209 lb (95 kg)	August 11, 1971 (aged 33)	(United States) Los Angeles Kings
28	D	Brian Rafalski	5 ft 10 in (178 cm)	192 lb (87 kg)	September 28, 1973 (aged 30)	(United States) New Jersey Devils
23	D	Mathieu Schneider	5 ft 11 in (180 cm)	192 lb (87 kg)	June 12, 1969 (aged 35)	(United States) Detroit Red Wings
6	D	Eric Weinrich	6 ft 1 in (185 cm)	209 lb (95 kg)	December 9, 1966 (aged 37)	(United States) St. Louis Blues (Note: Played ten games for Villacher SV during the 2004-05 NHL lockout)
11	F	Tony Amonte	6 ft 0 in (183 cm)	202 lb (92 kg)	August 2, 1970 (aged 34)	(Canada) Calgary Flames
55	F	Jason Blake	5 ft 10 in (178 cm)	190 lb (86 kg)	September 12, 1973 (aged 31)	(United States) New York Islanders (Note: Played seven games for HC Lugano during the 2004-05 NHL lockout)
33	F	Craig Conroy	6 ft 2 in (188 cm)	194 lb (88 kg)	September 4, 1971 (aged 33)	(United States) Los Angeles Kings
37	F	Chris Drury	5 ft 10 in (178 cm)	190 lb (86 kg)	August 20, 1976 (aged 28)	(United States) Buffalo Sabres
19	F	Scott Gomez	5 ft 11 in (180 cm)	201 lb (91 kg)	December 23, 1979 (aged 24)	(United States) New Jersey Devils (Note: Played 61 games for the Alaska Aces during the 2004-05 NHL lockout)
13	F	Bill Guerin	6 ft 2 in (188 cm)	220 lb (100 kg)	November 9, 1970 (aged 33)	(United States) Dallas Stars
16	F	Brett Hull	5 ft 11 in (180 cm)	201 lb (91 kg)	August 9, 1964 (aged 40)	(United States) Phoenix Coyotes
22	F	Steve Konowalchuk	6 ft 1 in (185 cm)	198 lb (90 kg)	November 11, 1972 (aged 31)	(United States) Colorado Avalanche
15	F	Jamie Langenbrunner	6 ft 1 in (185 cm)	205 lb (93 kg)	July 24, 1975 (aged 29)	(United States) New Jersey Devils (Note: Played 11 games for ERC Ingolstadt during the 2004-05 NHL lockout)
9	F	Mike Modano (A)	6 ft 3 in (191 cm)	210 lb (95 kg)	June 7, 1970 (aged 34)	(United States) Dallas Stars
97	F	Jeremy Roenick	6 ft 1 in (185 cm)	205 lb (93 kg)	January 17, 1970 (aged 34)	(United States) Philadelphia Flyers
12	F	Brian Rolston	6 ft 2 in (188 cm)	214 lb (97 kg)	February 21, 1973 (aged 31)	(United States) Minnesota Wild
21	F	Bryan Smolinski	6 ft 1 in (185 cm)	203 lb (92 kg)	December 27, 1971 (aged 32)	(Canada) Ottawa Senators (Note: Played 21 games for the Motor City Mechanics during the 2004-05 NHL lockout)
17	F	Keith Tkachuk	6 ft 2 in (188 cm)	235 lb (107 kg)	March 28, 1972 (aged 32)	(United States) St. Louis Blues
39	F	Doug Weight	5 ft 11 in (180 cm)	196 lb (89 kg)	January 21, 1971 (aged 33)	(United States) St. Louis Blues (Note: Played seven games for the Frankfurt Lions during the 2004-05 NHL lockout)

== See also ==
- 2004 World Cup of Hockey statistics
