= EV Landshut =

Eislaufverein Landshut
- City: Landshut, Bavaria, Germany
- League: DEL 2
- Founded: 1948
- Home arena: VR-Bank Landshut Arena (capacity: 4448 [after stadium renovation])
- Colours: Red, white
- General manager: Ralf Hantschke
- Head coach: Uwe Krupp
- Captain: Andreas Schwarz
- Website: www.evl.info www.ev-landshut.com

Franchise history
- 1948–2002: Eislaufverein Landshut
- 2002–2013: Landshut Cannibals
- 2013–2015: EVL Landshut Eishockey
- 2015–present: Eislaufverein Landshut

Former team logo (2002–2012)

EV Landshut, formerly known as the Landshut Cannibals and later as EVL Landshut Eishockey, are a professional ice hockey team based in Landshut, Bavaria, Germany. They currently play in Deutsche Eishockey Liga 2, the second level of ice hockey in Germany. They were promoted from the third-tier Oberliga in 2019 after winning the Oberliga finals against the Tilburg Trappers.

The team was founded in 1948 as Eislaufverein Landshut (EVL), but since 2002 the professional operations have been incorporated as a separate entity. From 2002 to 2013 the professional team was competing as the Landshut Cannibals; in 2013 the name was changed back to EVL Landshut Eishockey to more closely reflect the tradition and history of the team. There is close cooperation with the not-for-profit EVL, which is still responsible for non-professional sporting competitions, i.e. junior hockey and figure skating. From 1963 to 1994 the team was a participant in the Ice hockey Bundesliga, and was a founder member of the DEL. The team won the West German National Championship in 1970 and 1983.

The home arena of the Landshut Cannibals is the Eisstadion am Gutenbergweg, where they have played since 1957, after leaving tentative other locations. The arena has since been renovated several times, last in 2021, and currently holds 4,448 people. Landshut's player development program is counted among the best in Germany, producing numerous well-known hockey players such as “Germany’s hockey player of the century” Erich Kühnhackl, Gerd Truntschka (All-Star at the 1987 World Ice Hockey Championships) and longtime NHL players Marco Sturm (Washington Capitals), Christoph Schubert (Atlanta Thrashers), Tobias Rieder and double Stanley Cup winner Tom Kühnhackl (Pittsburgh Penguins and New York Islanders).

== History ==
=== The origins of ice hockey in Landshut and promotion to the top division (1934–1957) ===
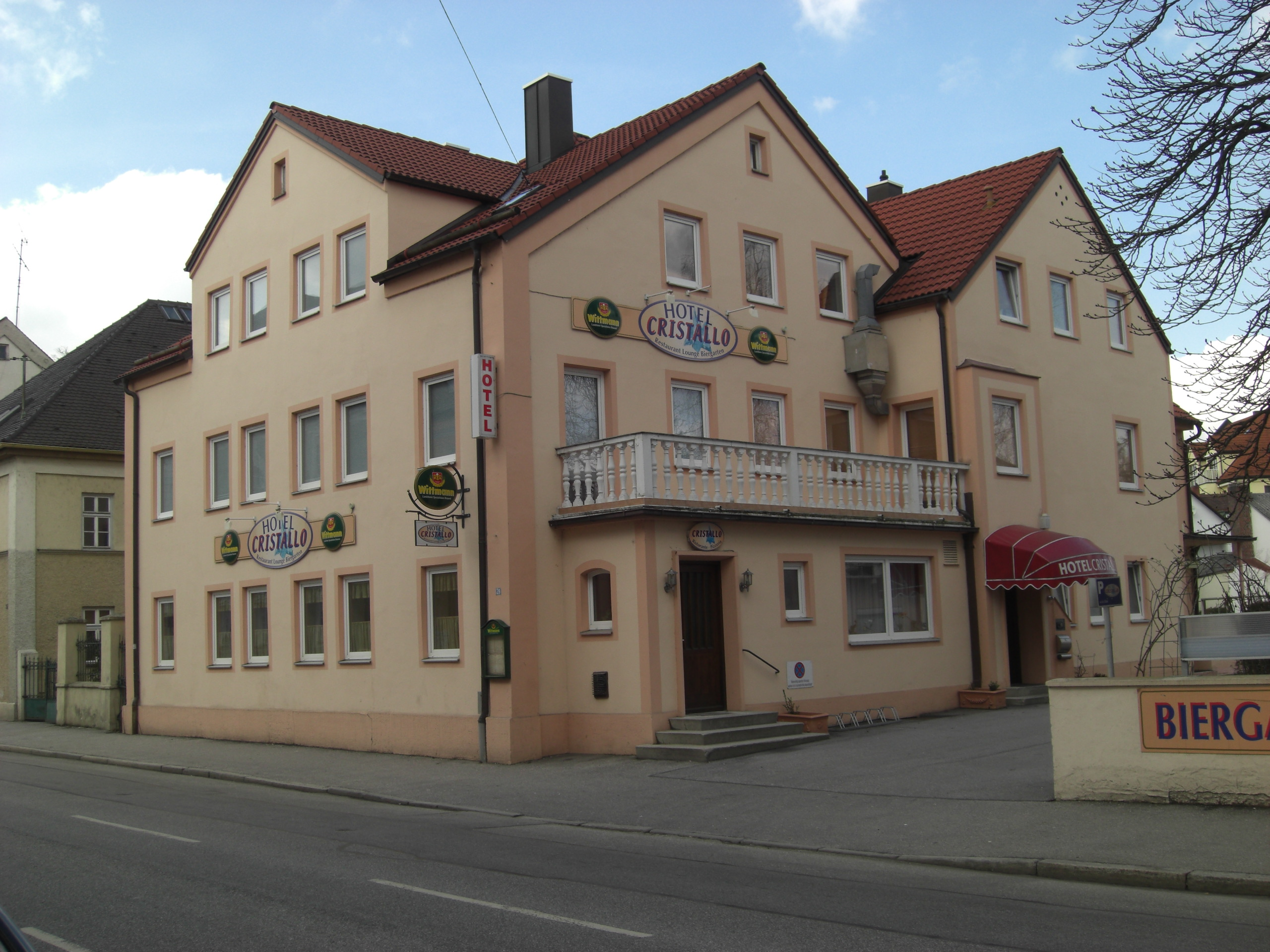
The former “Sterngarten” tavern

It was not until 1934 when Landshut-born Heinz Wittmann organised an ice hockey team from Garmisch-Partenkirchen. The first games were played under the name of Team Brauerei Wittmann (named after Wittmann Brewery) against squads from Wartenberg, Bavaria and Donaustauf. On February 1, 1934 the team was incorporated into the Ski-Club Landshut (SCL). The same season they became champions of the Danube region. The 1935–36 season marked the first appearance in the Kreisliga (then second division), where the squad played the following three years. In 1937 the ice hockey section was transferred from the SCL to another club, the Turngemeinde Landshut (TGL). After the 1938–39 season, a regular schedule of the league was no longer possible because of the outbreak of World War II. During the war there were only a few friendly games, for example against Straubing on January 10, 1943. From the first post-war season 1945–46 to 1947-48 the team started in the newly formed Landesliga – again as a section of the TGL. In 1948 contentions evolved concerning transferring the earnings from the lucrative hockey games to the club's other sections.

As a result of the dispute, most of TGL's hockey players formed a new registered association, the “Eislaufverein Landshut” (EVL). The founding ceremony took place on April 25, 1948 at the Sterngarten tavern. The driving force behind this move was Georg Zeller; other notable players of the early time were Hans Frühmorgen, Walter Rauhmeier, and Jaro Truntschka. The latter would become an eight-time season-leading EVL scorer. The few players who stayed with the TGL formed a squad that broke up in 1951. The newly founded EVL team, however, started in the Landesliga, the then-second division. In the 1948–49 season, their first one, the team lost the finals against EV Tegernsee. The following eight seasons were also played in the Landesliga, until the team won the promotion tiebreaker for 1956–57 against TEV Miesbach. That game's decisive player was Jaro Truntschka, who scored twice. Following this victory, the club moved up to the Oberliga, then the top-level hockey league in Germany.

=== From the underdog to the champion of the ice hockey Bundesliga (1957–1994) ===
In the run-up to the first season in the Oberliga calls for the construction of an artificial ice rink grew louder, because with only a natural ice rink the EVL would not be competitive in Germany's highest hockey league. After prolonged negotiations, the city favored building an ice rink instead of a public pool, and with this cooperative work the Eisstadion am Gutenbergweg was completed timely for the 1957–58 season (then without roof). The official inauguration took place on November 10, 1957 against EC Kitzbühel. 5,000 spectators saw a 4–4 draw. Thanks to the new rink, the EVL played against international teams (e.g. Blau-Weiss Zürich, HC Bozen or HK Partizan Belgrad for the first time. Following the season, the German league system was reformed and EV Landshut was relegated to the second division (then called Oberliga).

Increasing its pace of junior hockey player development, the team was quite successful in the following years. Placing 1st after the 1961–62 season, the EVL lost the promotion tiebreaker against TSC Eintracht Dortmund, but the consecutive season they beat Dortmund and were promoted to the ice hockey Bundesliga. Without acquiring new players, the Landshut-based team started their first Bundesliga season in 1963-64 as an underdog and candidate for relegation. Home games attracted up to 10,000 people. Surprisingly the team reached fifth place out of eight. 1965 marked the beginning of a friendly relationship with HC Sparta Praha, e.g. regarding training camps and friendly games. In 1967, ten years after the construction of the ice rink, the stadium was roofed and converted into an arena. That year the EV Landshut signed coach Karel Gut from Sparta Praha for three years. In his first year on the Isar, his team placed third. The following year was rather disappointing: having placed fourth, the squad had to play to avoid relegation. The 1969–70 season preliminary round, with the team facing pressure to perform, resulted in a first-place finish. The championship round was also dominated by Landshut, winning the German championship for the first time. The hockey euphoria in the city was immense; four out of ten home games were sold out. The most impactful players during the season were Alois Schloder, Rudi Hejtmanek, and goalie Sepp Schramm. In the 1970-71 European Cup, Landshut defeated SG Cortina, but was disqualified due to an unlicensed player.

In the following years the team were runners-up twice in 1973-74 and 1975–76. Both Alois Schloder and Erich Kühnhackl were in the top-five scorers in the Bundesliga for several seasons. An important task for every coach was the integration of the most talented junior players into the professional team. In a legendary game in the 1974–75 season, the team suffered a 0–10 loss against Krefeld, with only six players available due to a flu epidemic. In the following season two young players joined the team, who would be important in the years to come: Bernhard Englbrecht and Gerd Truntschka. At the 1976 Winter Olympics in Innsbruck three EVL players joined the German national team: Alois Schloder, Erich Kühnhackl, and Klaus Auhuber. The Germans won bronze, finishing behind the Soviet Union and Czechoslovakia – the greatest victory in German hockey history at the time. After middling results in the 1977–78 season, the management signed František Pospíšil. Nevertheless, the team had to play to avoid relegation and the attendance dropped from an estimated 4,500 to 1,700. Signing Jiří Kochta for the 1979–80 season brought better luck and a fourth-place finish.

In 1980 the coach from the first championship season, Karel Gut, returned to Landshut. This season saw the NHL-like playoff system introduced. While the team was eliminated in the 1980-81 quarterfinals, and the 1981-82 semifinals, they knocked out Mannheimer ERC in the 1982-83 finals, becoming German champions for the second time. The major players for Landshut were Bob Laycock, Robin Laycock, and Michael Betz (who scored the decisive goal in the last game of the final).

In the 1983–84 season, the EV Landshut lost in the finals against Kölner EC and were runners-up. In the following years, the club faced increasing financial troubles, as did most Bavarian hockey strongholds. Depts totalled 2.7 million Deutsche Mark. This was because Landshut's junior player education costs were expensive, and the well-trained players would be contracted by wealthy larger city clubs Despite signing a few well-known players like Tom Roulston, Matti Hagman, and Tom O'Regan between 1984 and 1989 the club was not able to get through the quarterfinals. They declined from fourth to eighth in the preliminary standings, before the team missed the playoff qualification in the 1989-90 preliminaries. They finished first in the relegation round. The 1990-91 preliminaries saw a ninth-place finish, but in the playdowns the EVL knocked out EHC Dynamo Berlin. In the following season, the squad finally hit rock bottom, losing all its relegation games. After surviving the 1992-93 relegation round, Landshut's management decided to invest in a punchier lineup to play for the championship, but the team was knocked out in the quarterfinals.

=== The founding of the DEL and the sale of the license (1994–2000) ===
Due to the bleak financial situation in German professional ice hockey, the Deutsche Eishockey Liga was founded in 1994. It was the first self-managed German professional league. All teams of the Bundesliga and the 2nd Bundesliga were outsourcing their professional operations into corporations. The EV Landshut's team was transferred to the Cannibals Eissport GmbH and for marketing purposes the professional team was known as the Landshut Cannibals from that point.

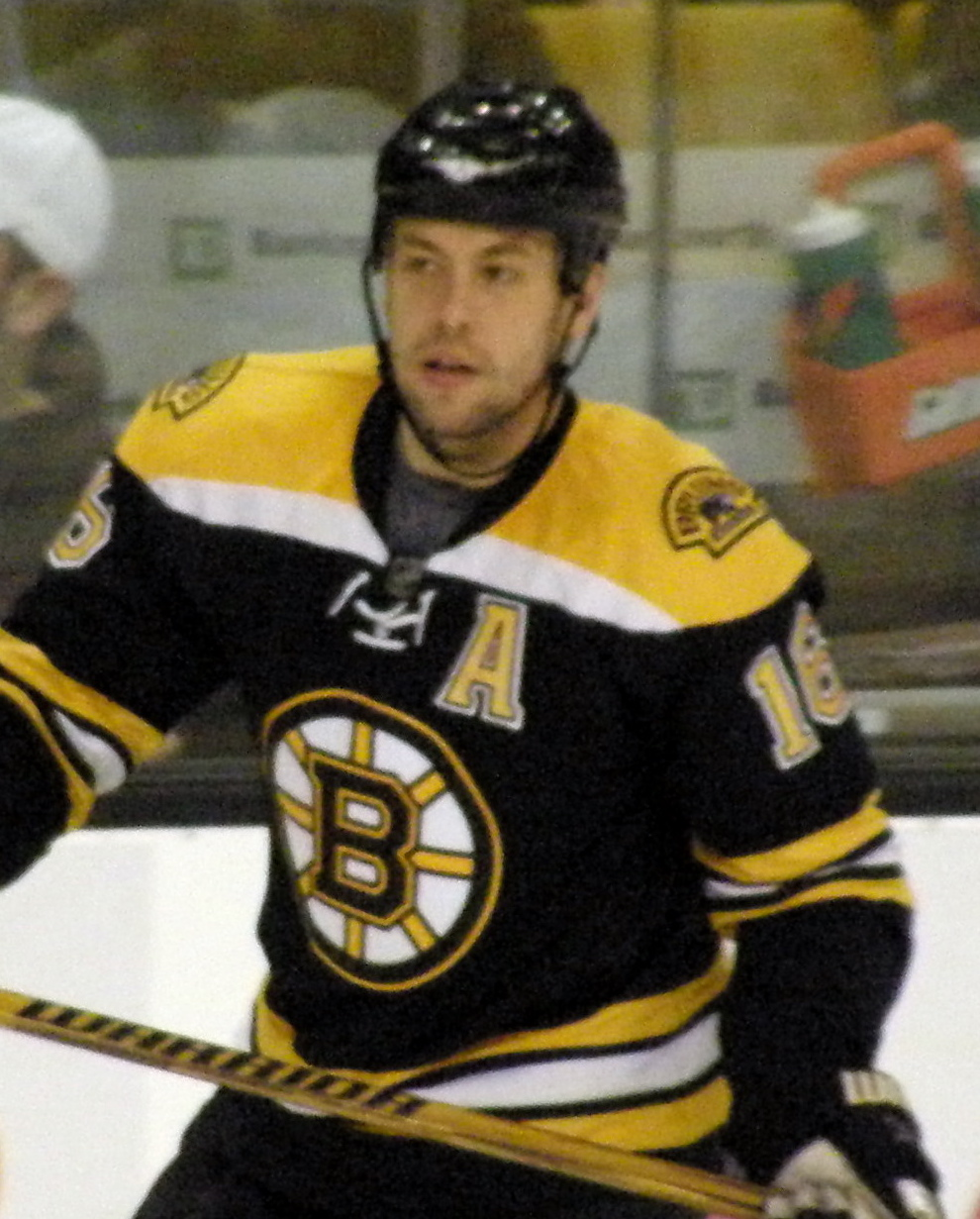
Marco Sturm playing for the Boston Bruins

In the 1994-95 DEL season – the first ever for the league – coach Bernie Johnston was able to keep most of the previous year's squad and strengthened it by signing NHL star Wallace Schreiber. Furthermore, benefited the team from the 1994–95 NHL lockout more than most other DEL franchises, with Pavel Bure, Scott Young and Uwe Krupp playing shortly for the Cannibals. Bure's only game for Landshut was legendary, scoring three times against the Eisbären Berlin. Ranked second after the preliminaries, the Cannibals knocked out the Lausitzer Füchse in the round of sixteen, before defeating both Kassel Huskies and Krefeld Pinguine. In the finals, they were beaten by the Kölner Haie. Wallace Schreiber and Mike Bullard were the top scorers in the league, with 38 and 39 goals respectively. The following season the Cannibals landed José Charbonneau (top scorer with 42 goals), while Marco Sturm turned professional and scored 12 times. In the 1995-96 playoff season they defeated the Starbulls Rosenheim in the first round and swept the Adler Mannheim, setting up another showdown with the Kölner Haie, which they lost. In the 1996-97 playoffs they played Köln for the third time in a row, this time knocking them out in the quarterfinal round, before losing to Mannheim in the semifinals. The top scorer was Gino Cavallini with 28 goals. The following season's team, led by top scorer Dave McLlwain, swept rival Kölner Haie, but lost to the Eisbären Berlin in the semifinals.

For the 1998-99 DEL season, the Cannibals management envisaged proceeding to the final round for the first time in the last four years. After signing Chris Valentine as coach, they signed former NHL players Dean Evason, Jason Herter, David Bruce, Mike Casselman, Peter Douris, and Bob Joyce as well as Evan Marble and Jari Korpisalo. In sixth place after the preliminary round, the squad was surprisingly knocked out in the quarterfinals by the Adler Mannheim. The disappointment of the early elimination gave way to consternation regarding the club's financial situation. With depths totaling 10 million Marks (about 6.5 mil. USD) the club management announced on May 12, 1999, they would not be able to run a team for the 1999/2000 DEL season. The franchise for the corporation Cannibals Eissport GmbH was sold to the Anschutz Entertainment Group, renamed “MEC Münchener Eishockey Club GmbH” (Munich ice hockey club Gmbh) and relocated to Munich, where the franchise played for three seasons as Munich Barons. In 2002 the franchise was relocated to Hamburg and started operation as the Hamburg Freezers. A cooperation contract ruled out that EV Landshut had to stay two levels below the Barons for at least three years, therefore earning 350,000 Marks for junior hockey development per year. As a result, ice hockey in Landshut had to continue on in the third-level semi-professional Oberliga after 36 seasons of top-level participation.

=== The new beginning in the third division (2000–2003) ===
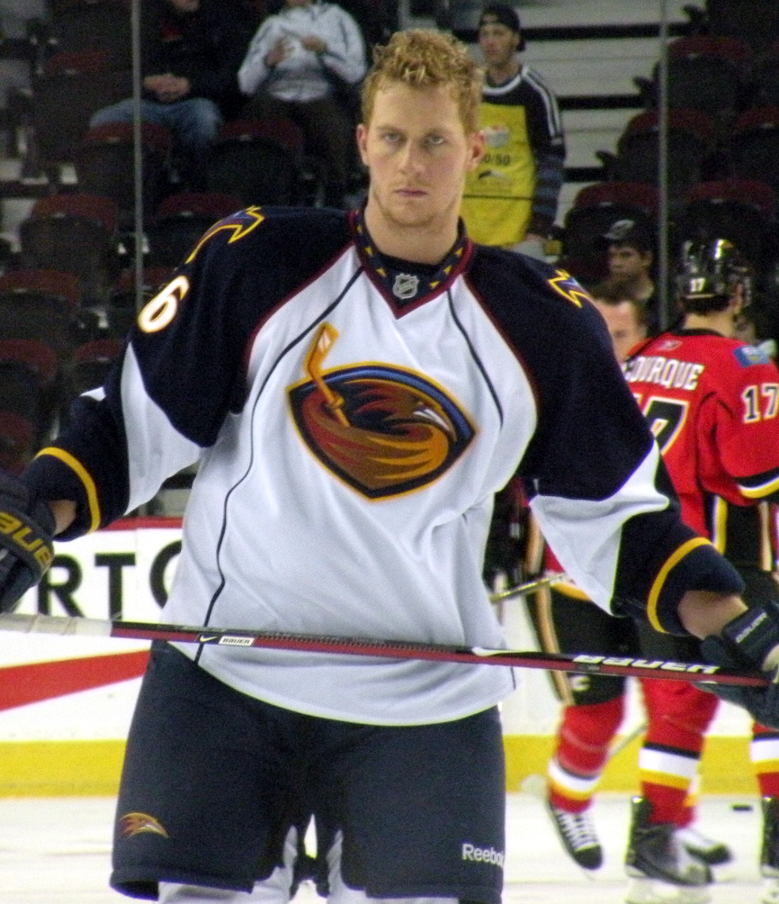
Christoph Schubert playing for the Atlanta Thrashers

With the end of top-level professional ice hockey in Landshut, most of the squad left the team and continued their careers with the Munich Barons or other clubs in the DEL. Michael Eibl was one of the first newcomers to join the team, which consisted mainly of young players out of the club's junior teams (e.g. Markus Hundhammer and Christoph Schubert), but also included foreign players like Kamil Ťoupal from HC České Budějovice. Later the management signed Gary Clark as coach. In sixth place after the preliminaries, the squad knocked out the Grizzly Adams Wolfsburg and the TSV Erding and qualified for playing the 2000/01 2nd Bundesliga season, but had to withdraw due to the cooperation contract with the Munich Barons.

After completing the 2000/01 Oberliga preliminaries in sixth place, the team was swept by the Füchse Duisburg in the playoff quarterfinal round. That season saw later general manager Bernd Truntschka return as a player due to a player shortage. The average audience dropped to 1,300 – a record low in the recent history of the club. The following season the management signed coach Bernhard Englbrecht and fought for promotion. Due to ongoing financial troubles – a legacy of the DEL era – the club filed for bankruptcy, while the team still was playing the preliminaries. They placed first, finishing 14 points better than second-place ESV Kaufbeuren. The squad swept Erding in the semifinals and the Dresdner Eislöwen in the finals. Consequently, EV Landshut was promoted to the 2nd Bundesliga.

=== Landshut Cannibals in the 2nd Bundesliga (since 2003) ===
Upon re-entering the professional league system, the professional operation of the EV Landshut was outsourced again. Since 2002 the team has been organised as the Landshuter Eishockey Spielbetriebs-GmbH and is known as the Landshut Cannibals. Bernd Truntschka was appointed general manager. In October 2002 the insolvency plan was approved and the following year the last debt payment was made.

The 2002-03 2nd Bundesliga preliminaries saw a surprising finish in fourth place. In the playoffs the squad knocked out the Heilbronner Falken but was defeated by SC Riessersee in the playoff semifinals. Christian Brittig was the top scorer with 20 goals. The Cannibals' second season in the league was even more successful: They beat the EV Duisburg, before defeating EC Bad Nauheim in the fifth and last game 3-2 SO. After losing the finals to Wolfsburg in four games Landshut were runners-up. 2,622 spectators per game watched this spectacular season, and with the insolvency proceedings completed, the EVL was debt-free.

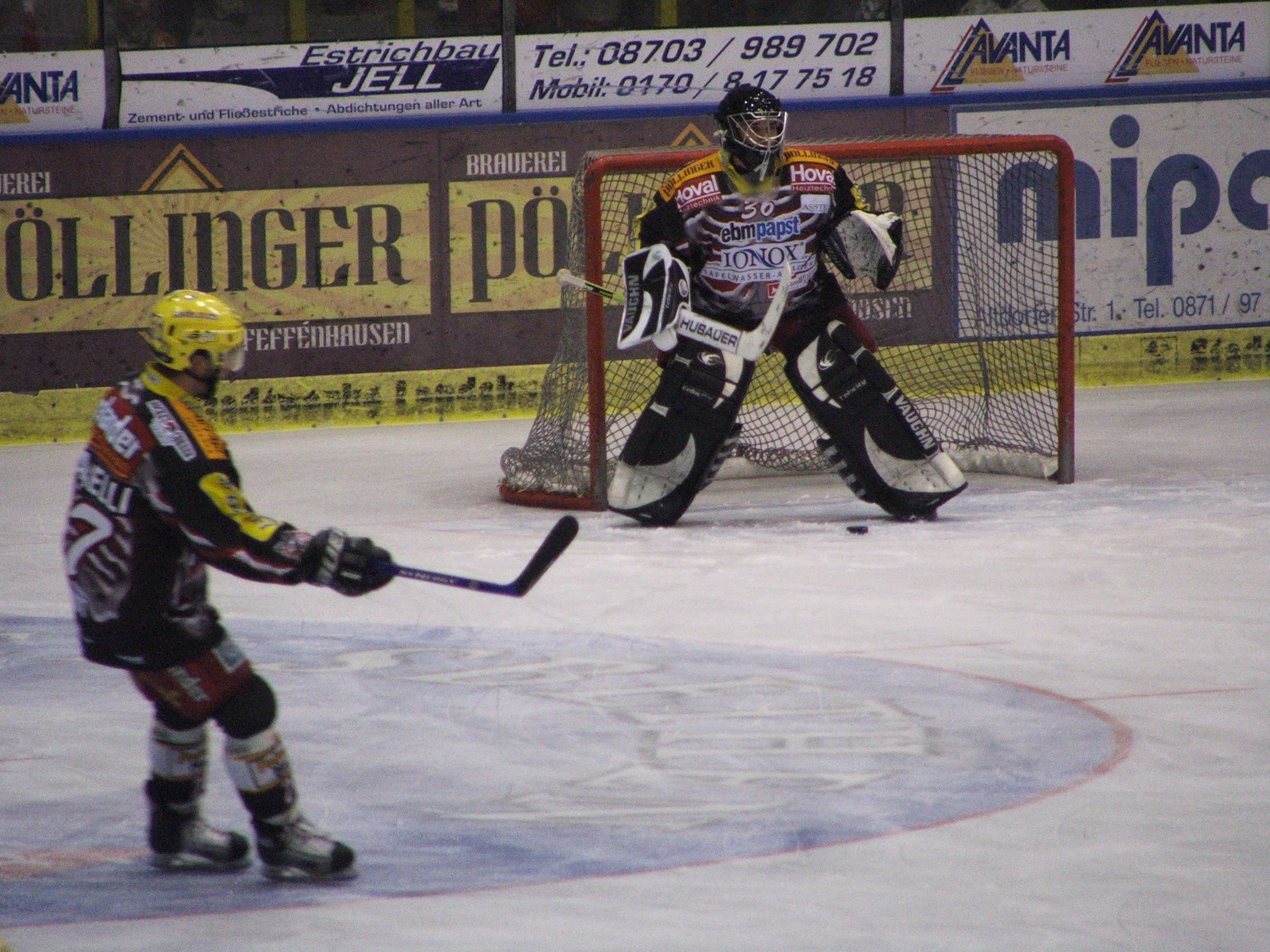
Stefan Horneber and T. J. Guidarelli in the Cannibals dress

In the 2004-05 preliminaries the team qualified for the playoffs. In the quarterfinals they were knocked out by derby opponent EV Regensburg. The following season the club signed among others Daniel Naud as coach and goalie Martin Cinibulk. The powerful squad was ranked second in the first round. Understandably management, players and fans were heavily disappointed as the team was defeated by underdog Dresdner Eislöwen in seven games. Strangely enough the EVL celebrated walkovers in the home games (7-1, 7–1, 4-1), while losing narrowly away. The team lost the final game in Landshut 4–1. In the 2006–07 season the Cannibals knocked out the Schwenninger Wild Wings, but were swept by Wolfsburg in the semifinals.

In the 2007-08 pre-season coach Andreas Brockmann formed a powerful team consisting of Brent Walton, Brandon Dietrich, and Peter Abstreiter and kept most of the regulars. The second placing in the preliminaries got fans and team in the right mood for a successful playoff season. In the quarterfinals the team defeated the Bietigheim Steelers 4–1, and swept Heilbronn in the semifinals. The Cannibals entered a 2nd Bundesliga final round for the second time since 2004. Although the team's opponent, the Kassel Huskies, had a budget twice the amount of Landshut's, the finals were close. Winning the first game 1–0 in Kassel, the team lost the following two encounters (0-6 and 0-5). In the fourth game the Cannibals won 5-4 in OT. The final game was not finished until Drew Bannister lifted Kassel to the championship and promotion to the DEL in overtime.

In the 2008–09 season the financial background was not that bright, so fifth place after the preliminaries was a good result. Ben Cottreau (top-scorer with 59 points) was a lucky pull, and Tom Kühnhackl made his debut in professional hockey. Unfortunately the team was defeated in the quarterfinals by EV Ravensburg in six games. The 2009-10 preliminaries resulted in a fifth place finish again. Even young forwards Tom Kühnhackl and Tobias Rieder, who left for Canada after that season, could not prevent a loss against Bietigheim in the playoff quarterfinals.

== Players ==
=== Roster ===
(current as of Sept. 10, 2019) Goalkeepers: Jaroslav Hübl, Philipp Maurer, Patrick Berger Defense Christian Ettwein, Stephan Kronthaler, Josh McFadden, Phillip Messing, Manuel Neumann, Elia Ostwald, Mario Zimmermann Offense: Marco Baßler, Maximilian Brandl, Robbie Czarnik, Alexander Ehl (FL), Christoph Fischhaber, Maximilian Forster, Erik Gollenbeck, Maximilian Hofbauer, Ales Jirik, Tadas Kumeliauskas, Lukas Mühlbauer, Mathieu Pompei, Marc Schmidpeter, Marco Sedlar, Luca Trinkberger Manager: Axel Kammerer

=== Honored members ===
Many important hockey players played in Landshut or learned how to play hockey there. The first-ever German drafted into the NHL, Bernhard “Bernie” Englbrecht was a product of Landshut's system, as were the two bronze medal winners of the 1976 olympics, Klaus “Butzi” Auhuber and franchise player Alois Schloder. Some of the most known were Sepp Schramm, Jaro Truntschka, Rudi Hejtmanek, Jiri Kochta, Bob and Robin Laycock, Helmut Steiger, Christian Brittig, Mike Bullard, Petr Briza, Wally Schreiber, Matti Hagman, Jiri Pospisil, Craig Laughlin, Bernd Truntschka and in more recent times, Kamil Toupal. The most notable coaches in club history include Dr. Karel Gut and Bernie Johnston.

- Erich Kühnhackl
- Alois Schloder
- Gerd Truntschka
- Bernd Truntschka
- Helmut Steiger
- Udo Kiessling
- Marco Sturm
- Christoph Schubert
- Mike Bullard
- Hans Zach
- Bernhard Englbrecht
- Wallace Schreiber
- Petr Briza
- Pavel Bure (played 1 game: 3 goals)
- Peter Douris
- Dean Evason
- Gino Cavallini
- Craig Laughlin
- Matti Hagman
