= Korpisalo =

Korpisalo is a Finnish surname. Notable people with the surname include:

- Jari Korpisalo (born 1966), Finnish ice hockey player
- Joonas Korpisalo (born 1994), Finnish ice hockey player
