= Pasi Peltonen =

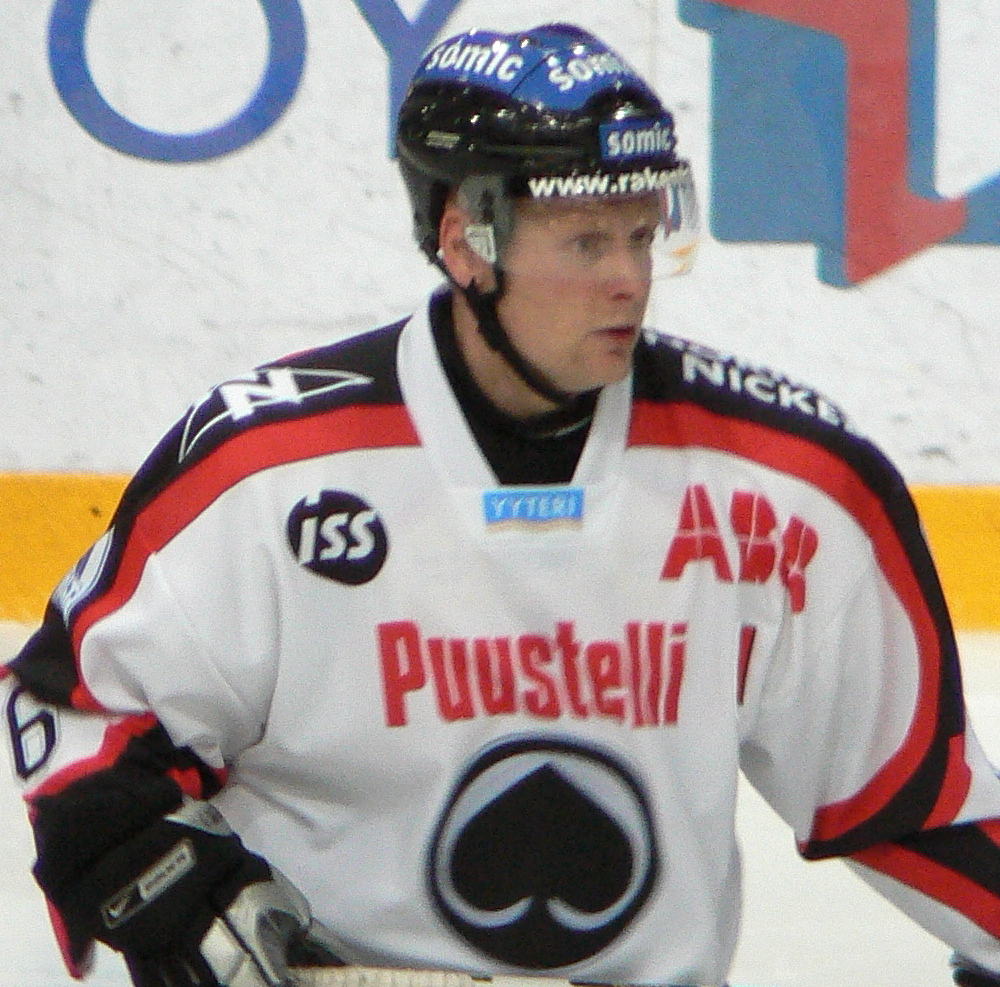
- Pasi Peltonen with Ässät in 2008
- Born: 17 February 1972 (age 53) Pori, Finland
- Height: 186 cm (6 ft 1 in)
- Weight: 90 kg (198 lb; 14 st 2 lb)
- Position: Defence
- Shot: Left
- Played for: Porin Ässät
- Playing career: 1993–2009

Pasi Peltonen (born 17 February 1972) is a Finnish former professional ice hockey defenceman. Peltonen played his whole career in Porin Ässät of the SM-liiga (now Liiga) playing over 800 matches between 1993 and 2009 and serving as Ässät's captain during four seasons and as assistant captain during six seasons. Peltonen won bronze with Ässät in the 1994–95 season and silver in the 2005–06 season. Peltonen is also in second place with all-time regular season SM-liiga penalty minutes with 1402.

== Playing career ==
Pasi Peltonen was an Ässät junior, playing his last junior game in 1993.

In the 1993–94 season Peltonen was promoted to Ässät's men's SM-liiga roster. Peltonen appeared in 47 regular season games where his point total was 7. Peltonen gathered a plus-minus of +17 and a total of 48 penalty minutes. Peltonen captained Ässät through 1998–2000 and 2005–2007. Peltonen captained Ässät through the 2005–06 playoffs and into the finals where HPK Hämeenlinna was better with wins 3 to 1. Peltonen ended his career with Ässät in 2009 after a battle against Vaasan Sport to avoid relegation, in which Ässät succeeded.

Overall in Peltonen's career he played 827 games through 16 seasons with 234 points, 1 402 penalty minutes and a plus-minus of -65.

Sporting positions
Preceded by Jari Korpisalo	Porin Ässät captain 2005–07	Succeeded by Matti Kuparinen
Preceded by Jari Levonen	Porin Ässät captain 1998–00	Succeeded by Jari Korpisalo
