= Hundhammer =

Hundhammer is a German surname. Notable people with the surname include:

- Alois Hundhammer (1900–1974), German politician
- Beate Heieren Hundhammer (born 1968), Norwegian politician
- Markus Hundhammer (born 1980), German ice hockey player
- Richard Hundhammer, German politician (1927–2012)
