= Michael Betz =

German ice hockey player

- Born: 19 February 1962 (age 63); Landshut, West Germany
- Height: 5 ft 11 in (180 cm)
- Weight: 168 lb (76 kg; 12 st 0 lb)
- Position: Forward
- Shot: Left
- Played for: EV Landshut; Sportbund DJK Rosenheim; EC Hedos München; TSV Erding
- National team: Germany
- NHL draft: Undrafted
- Playing career: 1980–1990

Michael Betz (born 19 February 1962) is a German ice hockey player. He competed in the men's tournament at the 1984 Winter Olympics.

== Career statistics ==
			Regular season					Playoffs
Season	Team	League	GP	G	A	Pts	PIM	GP	G	A	Pts	PIM
1980–81	EV Landshut	Germany	41	6	5	11	11	4	0	0	0	2
1981–82	EV Landshut	Germany	43	17	10	27	16	—	—	—	—	—
1982–83	EV Landshut	Germany	—	—	—	—	—	—	—	—	—	—
1983–84	Sportbund DJK Rosenheim	Germany	—	—	—	—	—	—	—	—	—	—
1984–85	Sportbund DJK Rosenheim	Germany	45	25	10	35	12	—	—	—	—	—
1985–86	Sportbund DJK Rosenheim	Germany	35	10	7	17	26	9	3	2	5	0
1986–87	Sportbund DJK Rosenheim	Germany	33	5	2	7	10	9	0	1	1	0
1987–88	EC Hedos München	Germany	32	23	27	50	34	—	—	—	—	—
1988–89	EC Hedos München	Germany	35	28	11	39	34	—	—	—	—	—
1989–90	TSV Erding	Germany3	26	35	19	54	43	—	—	—	—	—
Germany totals			264	114	72	186	143	53	17	16	33	8
