= Jari Korpisalo =

Finnish ice hockey player

- Born: 17 February 1966 (age 60) Helsinki, Finland
- Height: 5 ft 10 in (178 cm)
- Weight: 176 lb (80 kg; 12 st 8 lb)
- Position: Forward
- Shot: Right
- Played for: Ässät; EV Landshut; Munich Barons
- National team: Finland
- Playing career: 1986–2005

Jari Korpisalo (born 17 February 1966) is a Finnish former professional ice hockey player.

== Playing career ==
He played 575 games in the SM-liiga with Ässät Pori, scoring 213 goals and 231 assists for 444 points, while accumulating 893 penalty minutes.

Korpisalo competed in the 1993 Men's World Ice Hockey Championships as a member of the Finland men's national ice hockey team.

== Personal life ==
Korpisalo's son, Joonas, is a professional goaltender for the New York Rangers of the National Hockey League (NHL). He also has represented Team Finland in several international junior tournaments.

== Career statistics ==
			Regular season					Playoffs
Season	Team	League	GP	G	A	Pts	PIM	GP	G	A	Pts	PIM
1985–86	Granby Bisons	QMJHL	60	22	27	49	73	—	—	—	—	—
1986–87	Karhu-Kissat	I-Divisioona	44	23	20	43	72	—	—	—	—	—
1987–88	SaPKo	I-divisioona	29	15	16	31	30	—	—	—	—	—
1988–89	Karhu-Kissat	I-Divisioona	43	28	42	70	60	—	—	—	—	—
1989–90	Karhu-Kissat	I-Divisioona	43	31	45	76	56	—	—	—	—	—
1990–91	Ässät	Liiga	43	11	16	27	14	—	—	—	—	—
1991–92	Ässät	Liiga	43	25	21	46	24	8	2	2	4	2
1992–93	Ässät	Liiga	47	26	26	52	91	8	4	2	6	4
1993–94	Ässät	Liiga	48	26	23	49	86	5	1	2	3	4
1994–95	Ässät	Liiga	50	21	32	53	84	7	4	2	6	6
1995–96	Ässät	Liiga	49	27	20	47	90	3	1	0	1	6
1996–97	Ässät	Liiga	49	20	25	45	86	4	2	2	4	2
1997–98	EV Landshut	DEL	35	1	9	10	20	6	3	1	4	4
1998–99	EV Landshut	DEL	52	7	15	22	24	—	—	—	—	—
1999–00	München Barons	DEL	56	7	17	24	42	2	0	0	0	0
2000–01	Ässät	Liiga	50	17	25	42	119	—	—	—	—	—
2001–02	Ässät	Liiga	52	9	13	22	129	—	—	—	—	—
2002–03	Ässät	Liiga	56	12	12	24	60	—	—	—	—	—
2003–04	Ässät	Liiga	53	16	14	30	62	—	—	—	—	—
2004–05	Ässät	Liiga	35	3	4	7	46	2	0	1	1	0
Liiga totals			575	213	231	444	891	37	14	11	25	24

Sporting positions
Preceded by Pasi Peltonen	Porin Ässät captain 2000–05	Succeeded by Pasi Peltonen
Preceded by Jokke Heinänen	Porin Ässät captain 1995–97	Succeeded by Jari Levonen
