= Peter Douris =

- Born: February 19, 1966 (age 60) Toronto, Ontario, Canada
- Height: 6 ft 1 in (185 cm)
- Weight: 195 lb (88 kg; 13 st 13 lb)
- Position: Right wing
- Shot: Right
- Played for: Winnipeg Jets; Boston Bruins; Mighty Ducks of Anaheim; Dallas Stars
- NHL draft: 30th overall, 1984; Winnipeg Jets
- Playing career: 1985–2002

Peter W. Douris (born February 19, 1966) is a Canadian former professional ice hockey right winger who played in the National Hockey League from 1985 to 1998.

== Biography ==
Douris was born in Toronto, Ontario. As a youth, he played in the 1979 Quebec International Pee-Wee Hockey Tournament with a minor ice hockey team from Don Mills.

He was drafted in the second round, 30th overall by the Winnipeg Jets in the 1984 NHL entry draft after his freshman season at the University of New Hampshire. He left college hockey after his sophomore year to join the Canadian National Team in 1985-86.

In Douris's first season he only played 11 games and did not acquire any points. In his second season, he showed impressive actions in the American Hockey League for the Sherbrooke Canadiens by notching 14 goals and 28 assists for 42 points in 62 games. But in the Jets he was only dressed in 6 games.

After spending 3 seasons with the Jets he was traded to the St. Louis Blues for defenseman Kent Carlson and a fourth round draft pick. Peter spent the season playing for the Blues International Hockey League affiliate Peoria Rivermen. Douris signed with Boston Bruins for the 1989–90 season as an unrestricted free agent. In his first season in Boston colours, he played 36 games and notched 5 goals and 6 assists along with 15 penalty minutes.

In the 1992 playoffs with the Bruins, Douris scored the game-winner in Game Two at the Forum against Montreal en route to a four-game series sweep. It was the first time Boston had won an overtime playoff game at the Forum since 1943. "That was definitely a huge thrill," Douris says years later. "I remember coming off the ice, [and the scratches were] waiting by the dressing room... The look on their faces were like, 'Holy smokes! ... You just got an overtime goal at the Forum. You were just eating hotdogs in the stands with us [in the last game]!"

After spending three seasons with Boston, the Mighty Ducks of Anaheim acquired him as a free agent for their inaugural season in 1993. He was at the Mighty Ducks for three seasons before moving to the Dallas Stars in 1998 where he only play just one game and that was his last season with the NHL.

Douris then headed to Germany's Deutsche Eishockey Liga where he spent four seasons, one with Landshut EV and three with the Munich Barons after relocating from Landshut. Douris retired in 2002, in 11 NHL seasons he scored 54 goals and 67 assists for 121 points in 321 games, picking up 80 penalty minutes. Douris spent the 2013-2014 season as head coach of Vojens IK. He is now retired from hockey and lives in Maine where he works in real estate.

Douris's niece, Raina Douris, is the host of NPR's World Cafe.

== Career statistics ==
=== Regular season and playoffs ===
			Regular season					Playoffs
Season	Team	League	GP	G	A	Pts	PIM	GP	G	A	Pts	PIM
1981–82	Don Mills Flyers U18 AAA	GTHL U18	—	—	—	—	—	—	—	—	—	—
1982–83	Don Mills Flyers U18 AAA	GTHL U18	—	—	—	—	—	—	—	—	—	—
1983–84	University of New Hampshire	ECAC	38	19	15	34	14	—	—	—	—	—
1984–85	University of New Hampshire	Hockey East	42	27	24	51	34	—	—	—	—	—
1985–86	Winnipeg Jets	NHL	11	0	0	0	0	—	—	—	—	—
1985–86	Canadian National Team	Intl	33	16	7	23	18	—	—	—	—	—
1986–87	Sherbrooke Canadiens	AHL	62	14	28	42	24	17	7	15	22	16
1986–87	Winnipeg Jets	NHL	6	0	0	0	0	—	—	—	—	—
1987–88	Moncton Hawks	AHL	72	42	37	79	53	—	—	—	—	—
1987–88	Winnipeg Jets	NHL	4	0	2	2	0	1	0	0	0	0
1988–89	Peoria Rivermen	IHL	81	28	41	69	32	4	1	2	3	0
1989–90	Maine Mariners	AHL	38	17	20	37	14	—	—	—	—	—
1989–90	Boston Bruins	NHL	36	5	6	11	15	8	0	1	1	5
1990–91	Maine Mariners	AHL	35	16	15	31	9	2	3	0	3	2
1990–91	Boston Bruins	NHL	39	5	2	7	9	7	0	1	1	6
1991–92	Marine Mariners	AHL	12	4	3	7	2	—	—	—	—	—
1991–92	Boston Bruins	NHL	54	10	13	23	10	7	2	3	5	0
1992–93	Providence Bruins	AHL	50	29	26	55	12	—	—	—	—	—
1992–93	Boston Bruins	NHL	19	4	4	8	4	4	1	0	1	0
1993–94	Mighty Ducks of Anaheim	NHL	74	12	22	34	21	—	—	—	—	—
1994–95	Mighty Ducks of Anaheim	NHL	46	10	11	21	12	—	—	—	—	—
1995–96	Mighty Ducks of Anaheim	NHL	31	8	7	15	9	—	—	—	—	—
1996–97	Milwaukee Admirals	IHL	80	36	36	72	14	3	2	2	4	2
1997–98	Michigan K-Wings	IHL	78	26	31	57	29	4	0	5	5	2
1997–98	Dallas Stars	NHL	1	0	0	0	0	—	—	—	—	—
1998–99	EV Landshut	DEL	51	17	26	43	59	3	1	0	1	0
1999–00	Munich Barons	DEL	56	18	34	52	24	12	3	6	9	2
2000–01	Munich Barons	DEL	23	12	6	18	14	6	1	1	2	4
2001–02	Munich Barons	DEL	60	18	28	46	12	9	4	3	7	4
NHL totals			321	54	67	121	80	27	3	5	8	11

=== International ===
Year	Team	Event	GP	G	A	Pts	PIM
1986	Canada	WJC	7	4	2	6	6
Junior totals			7	4	2	6	6
