= Unto Wiitala trophy =

"Unto Wiitala" trophy
- Awarded for: Best referee of the season in ice hockey
- Country: Finland
- Presented by: Liiga

The Unto Wiitala trophy is an ice-hockey award given by the Finnish Liiga to the best referee of the season. It is named after Unto Wiitala a Finnish goalkeeper who competed in the 1950s and became a referee after his playing career.

== Trophy winners ==
Season	Winner
1967–68	Sakari Sillankorva
1968–69	Sakari Sillankorva
1969–70	Sakari Sillankorva
1970–71	Pentti Isotalo
1971–72	Unto Wiitala
1972–73	Unto Wiitala
1973–74	Unto Wiitala
1974–75	Unto Wiitala
1975–76	Raimo Sepponen
1976–77	Raimo Sepponen
1977–78	Karl-Gustav Kaisla
1978–79	Pertti Juhola
1979–80	Karl-Gustav Kaisla
1980–81	Antti Koskinen
1981–82	Raimo Sepponen
1982–83	Seppo Mäkelä
1983–84	Seppo Mäkelä
1984–85	Pertti Juhola
1985–86	Antti Koskinen
1986–87	Pertti Juhola
1987–88	Seppo Mäkelä
1988–89	Seppo Mäkelä
1989–90	Karl-Gustav Kaisla
1990–91	Antti Koskinen
1991–92	Seppo Mäkelä
1992–93	Seppo Mäkelä
1993–94	Kari Nieminen
1994–95	Rami Savolainen
1995–96	Seppo Mäkelä
1996–97	Seppo Mäkelä
1997–98	Seppo Mäkelä
1998–99	Pekka Haajanen
1999–00	Marko Lepaus
2000–01	Markku Kruus
2001–02	Markku Kruus
2002–03	Jari Levonen
2003–04	Timo Favorin
2004–05	Jari Levonen
2005–06	Markku Kruus
2006–07	Timo Favorin
2007–08	Timo Favorin
2008–09	Jari Levonen
2009–10	Jari Levonen
2010–11	Jari Levonen; Antti Boman
2011–12	Jari Levonen
2012–13	Aleksi Rantala
2013–14	Jari Levonen; Jukka Hakkarainen
2014–15	Stefan Fonselius
2015–16	Stefan Fonselius
2016–17	Timo Favorin
2017–18	Aleksi Rantala
2018–19	Stefan Fonselius
2019–20	Mikko Kaukokari
2020–21	Lassi Heikkinen
2021–22	Joonas Kova
2022–23	Mikko Kaukokari
2023–24	Joonas Kova
