= Ralf Hantschke =

German ice hockey player and general manager

- Born: 27 May 1965 (age 59); Bad Muskau, East Germany
- Height: 6 ft 1 in (185 cm)
- Weight: 190 lb (86 kg; 13 st 8 lb)
- Position: Right wing
- Shot: Left
- Played for: SG Dynamo/PEV/ES Weißwasser; Landshut Cannibals; Newcastle Cobras; Frankfurt Lions; EHC Leipziger Eislöwen
- National team: East Germany
- NHL draft: Undrafted
- Playing career: 1984–2004

Ralf Hantschke (born 27 May 1965) is a German former ice hockey player and the current general manager of the Lausitzer Füchse.

== Career ==
Hantschke began his career in 1984, playing for SG Dynamo Weißwasser in the DDR-Oberliga. He won the Oberliga with his team in 1989 and 1990. Following the Reunification of Germany in 1990, Hantschke played for PEV Weißwasser in the Eishockey-Bundesliga. Hantschke played for them until 1992, when he joined EV Landshut. For Landshut, he played two seasons in the Bundesliga and two more in the Deutsche Eishockey Liga (which had replaced the Bundesliga as the top-level German league in 1994). Hantschke then joined the Newcastle Cobras of the British Ice Hockey Superleague for the 1996-97 season, before returning to the DEL with the Frankfurt Lions the following season. He retired after the 2003-04 season spent with EHC Leipziger Eislöwen in the fourth-level Regionalliga.

=== International ===
Hantschke played for the East Germany national ice hockey team in the top-level World Championships in 1985, as well as in the B Pool in 1986, 1987, 1989, and 1990.
