= Daniel Naud =

Canadian ice hockey player and coach

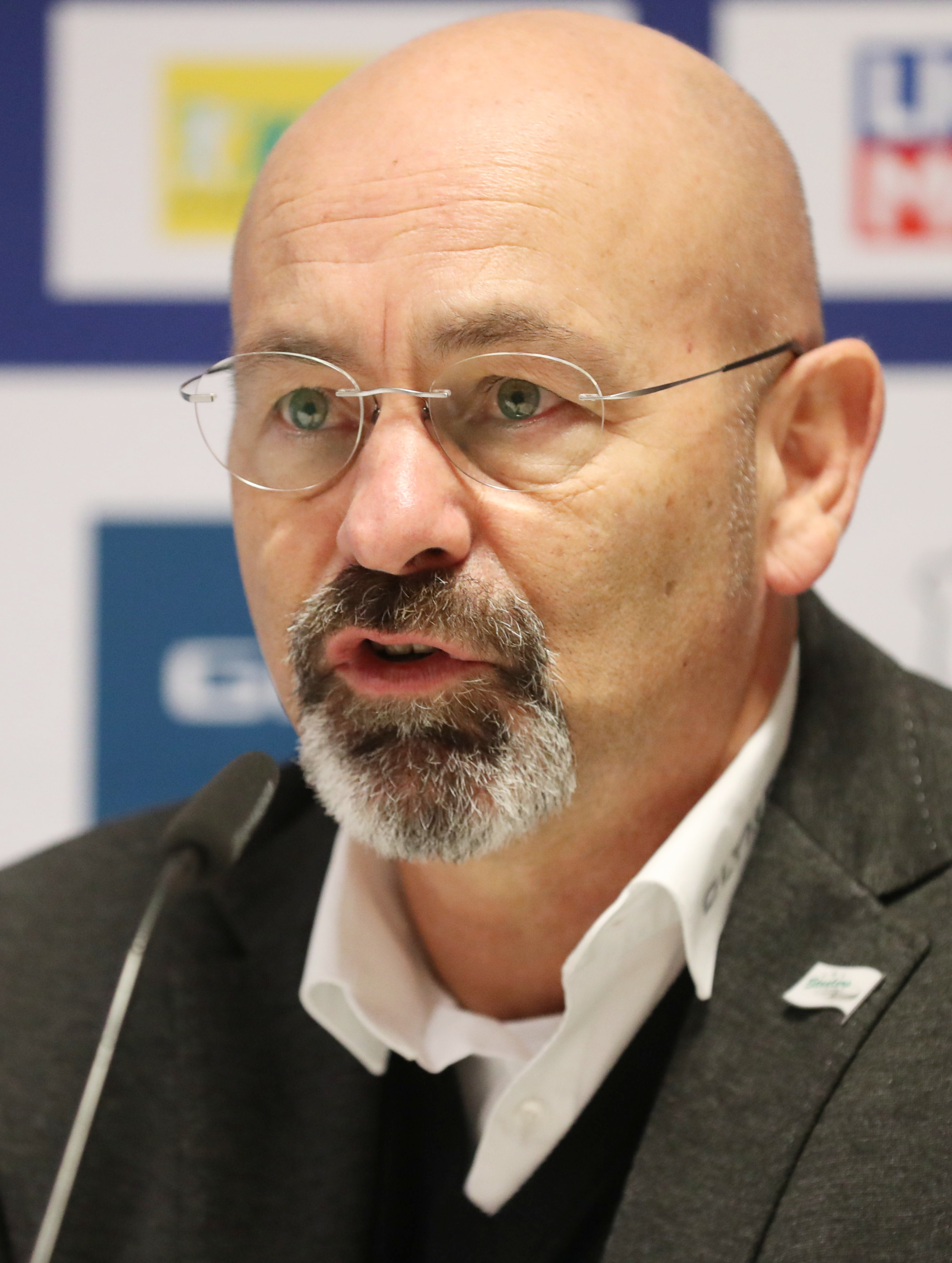
- Born: February 20, 1962 (age 64) Trois-Rivières, Quebec, Canada
- Height: 5 ft 10 in (178 cm)
- Weight: 190 lb (86 kg; 13 st 8 lb)
- Position: Defence
- Shot: Right
- Played for: Rochester Americans; Flint Generals; Muskegon Lumberjacks; Augsburger Panther; Minnesota Moose
- NHL draft: 125th overall, 1980; Buffalo Sabres
- Playing career: 1982–1997

Daniel "Danny" Naud (born February 20, 1962) is a Canadian professional ice hockey coach and a former professional player. He is currently serving as sporting director of the Bietigheim Steelers in Germany.

== Playing career ==
Born in Trois-Rivières, Quebec, Naud played professionally in the AHL and the IHL, before taking his game to Europe in 1986. A defenseman, his overseas career included stints in Germany (EV Landshut, Augsburger EV/Augsburger Panther, TuS Geretsried), Switzerland (SC Langnau) and France (Dragons de Rouen) and lasted from 1986 to 1999.

Highlights of his playing career were winning the AHL Calder Cup with the Rochester Americans in 1983, the Turner Cup with IHL’s Muskegon Lumberjacks in 1985 and earning promotion to the German elite league Deutsche Eishockey Liga with the Augsburger Panther in 1994. He also participated in the Spengler-Cup twice, representing Team Canada and HC Davos, and played in the Deutschland-Cup as a member of an DEL-Allstar-Team.

== Coaching career ==
Following his retirement as a player, Naud was named assistant coach of the Augsburger Panther, a member of the German elite league Deutsche Eishockey Liga (DEL) in 2000. As a player, he had spent four year with the club. During his first year coaching, Naud was promoted from assistant to head coach when the Panthers parted ways with Bob Manno in October 2000. Naud was relieved from his duties in November 2002 after an eleven-game losing streak and took the head coaching position at German second-division side Bietigheim Steelers in January 2003. He remained in the job until November 2004, followed by a short stint as head coach of the Straubing Tigers, another German second-division team, in 2004-05. Naud led the Tigers to the 2. Bundesliga finals.

Prior to the 2005-06 season, Naud was hired as head coach by the Landshut Cannibals, where he had started his overseas playing career in 1986. He spent two years at the helm, before returning to his native Québec, where he served as assistant coach of QMJHL’s Victoriaville Tigres in 2008-09.

Naud joined the coaching staff of German DEL team Hamburg Freezers for the 2009-10 campaign, serving as assistant to head coach Paul Gardner.

In 2010-11, he worked in the Swiss top flight NLA, serving a stint as an assistant coach at EHC Biel before moving to fellow NLA side HC Fribourg-Gottéron, where he held the same position.

From 2011 to 2014, Naud took over head coaching duties at Austrian HC Innsbruck, guiding the club to the Nationalliga championship title and to promotion to the country’s top-tier league in his first year. After three years at the Innsbruck helm, he did not have his contract renewed following the 2013-14 season.

Prior to the 2014-15 season, Naud was appointed head coach of German second-division club Ravensburg Towerstars. In February 2015, he signed a contract extension with the Towerstars through the 2015-16 season and then was handed a contract extension in April 2016. He was sacked on October 25, 2016. At that time, the Towerstars were sitting in 11th place in the DEL2 standings. He was named assistant coach of German DEL outfit EHC Wolfsburg on December 12, 2016 and stayed on that job until the end of the 2017-18 season. In February 2019, he took over the head coaching job at DEL2 team Eispiraten Crimmitschau. He parted company with the team in March 2020 after one season. The Crimmitschau team played 69 games under Naud, winning 30.

Naud was named head coach of the Bietigheim Steelers prior to the 2020-21 season. Under his guidance, Bietigheim won promotion to the German top-tier DEL in 2021. In Bietigheim's first DEL season, Naud managed to keep the team in the league. On November 26, 2022, he was sacked after only six wins in 22 games of the 2022-23 campaign. On February 17, 2023, Naud came back to Bietigheim, accepting the position as Sporting Director.

== Personal life ==
Guillaume Naud, one of his two sons, plays for the Bietigheim Steelers. He previously played for junior teams in Germany and Canada, and the universities of Lethbridge and Nipissing.
