= Unto Wiitala =

Finnish ice hockey player (1925–2019)

Unto Mauri Wiitala
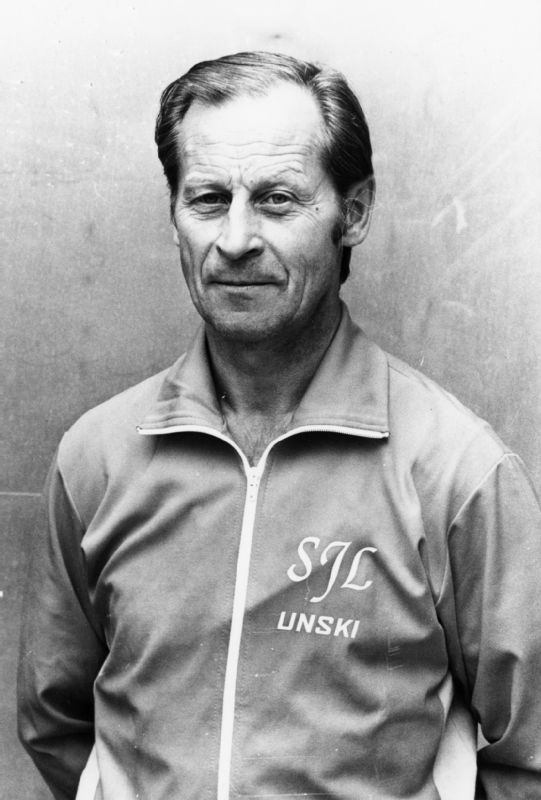
- Born: 5 July 1925
- Died: 16 January 2019 (aged 93)
- National team: Finland
- Playing career: 1946–1959

Unto Mauri Wiitala (5 July 1925 – 16 January 2019) was a Finnish professional ice hockey player who played in the SM-liiga. Born in Kuolemajärvi, Finland, he played for Hämeenlinnan Tarmo before working as a referee and hockey executive. He competed at the 1952 Winter Olympics with Team Finland and five Ice Hockey World Championships.

Wiitala was inducted into the Finnish Hockey Hall of Fame in 1985 and became the first Finnish referee inducted into the IIHF Hall of Fame. The Finnish Liiga honored him by naming their best referee during the regular season award in his name.

== Career ==
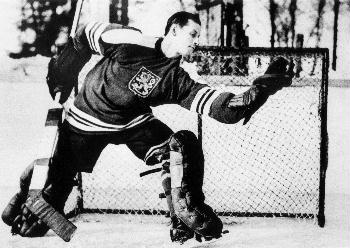
Unto Wiitala in 1950s

Wiitala began his professional career playing for Karhu-Kissat in 1946. In 1952, he was selected to represent Finland at the 1952 Winter Olympics where they placed fifth. His career ended with him being awarded the best goalkeeper award three times by 1956. After retirement, Wiitala became a referee for 15 consecutive seasons which included two Winter Olympic Games and three Ice Hockey World Championships. He was subsequently named referee-in-chief for the Liiga. He also served as chairperson of the Finnish Hockey Hall of Fame from 1996 to 2001.

Wiitala was inducted into the Finnish Hockey Hall of Fame in 1985 and later became the first Finnish referee inducted into the IIHF Hall of Fame. In 1995, in honor of his accomplishments, the Finnish Liiga named their best referee during the regular season award in his name.
