= Christoph Schubert =

German ice hockey player (born 1982)

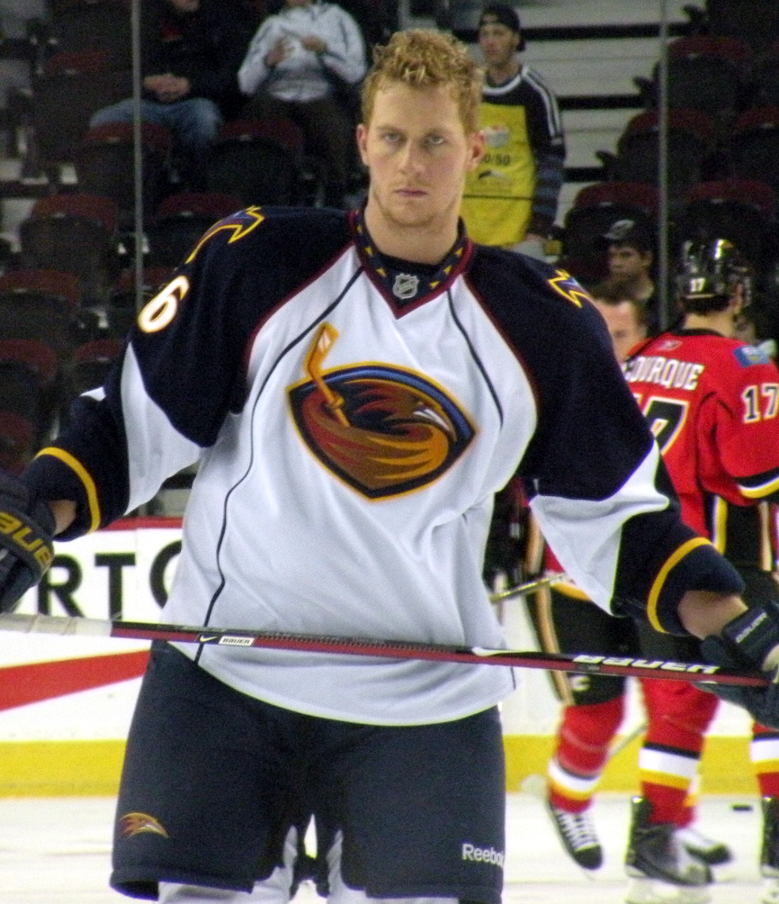
- Schubert with the Atlanta Thrashers in 2009
- Born: 5 February 1982 (age 44) Munich, West Germany
- Height: 1.90 m (6 ft 3 in)
- Weight: 107 kg (236 lb; 16 st 12 lb)
- Position: Defence
- Shot: Left
- Played for: Munich Barons; Ottawa Senators; Atlanta Thrashers; Frölunda HC; Hamburg Freezers; Hamburg Crocodiles
- National team: Germany
- NHL draft: 127th overall, 2001; Ottawa Senators
- Playing career: 2000–2019

Christoph Schubert (born 5 February 1982) is a German former professional ice hockey player. Schubert played over 300 games in the National Hockey League (NHL) for the Atlanta Thrashers and Ottawa Senators from 2005 to 2010.

== Playing career ==
Schubert started his career in the junior sections of the EHC Klostersee and moved, after his junior time, to the DNL-team EV Landshut. In the 1999–2000 season, as a 17-year-old, he made his debut in the Oberliga. After EV Landshut missed promotion to the 2nd Bundesliga, he joined his home team for the following season, German championship winners the Munich Barons in the Deutsche Eishockey Liga (DEL). In two future seasons, he evolved himself to a tough defenceman with a strong slap shot. In spring 2001, the Barons finished second in the German championship. Following the conclusion of the 2001–02 season, Schubert was drafted 127th overall in the 2001 NHL entry draft by the Ottawa Senators. He is generally seen as a competent defenceman and a checking forward with some physical upside.

One of his greatest assets is his shot, which was measured at over 100 mph in the 2005–06 Senators' Super Skills Competition, giving him the second-hardest shot in Senators team history behind former teammate Zdeno Chára.

He scored his first career NHL goal on future teammate Martin Gerber of the Carolina Hurricanes on 22 November 2005. In the 2006–07 Super Skills Competition for the Senators, despite losing to Mike Fisher for the hardest shot, he achieved first place in the puck control relay portion.

At the beginning of the 2009–10 season, on October 2, Schubert was claimed off waivers by the Atlanta Thrashers. Schubert remained on the Thrashers roster primarily as a depth player and in 47 games scored 2 goals and 7 points.

In the following 2010–11 season, Schubert was unable to garner another NHL contract and after eight years returned to Europe, signing with Frölunda HC of the Swedish Elitserien on 15 September 2010. Contributing 4 assists in 23 games with the Indians, Schubert was mutually released from his contract and returned to his native Germany, signing a two-year deal with the Hamburg Freezers of the DEL on 8 December 2010. In November 2011, he signed a contract extension until 2015 and in July 2013, Schubert inked a new deal with the Freezers that would keep him in Hamburg until 2017.

After the owner of the Freezers, the Anschutz Entertainment Group, announced in May 2016 not to apply for a license for the 2016–17 DEL campaign, Schubert, and Moritz Fürste, a field hockey Olympic gold medalist and Hamburg native, launched an initiative to raise money to save the team. They collected more than 500,000 Euro within a couple of days, which however did not make the owner group change its mind. After the Freezers had folded, Schubert became a free agent. He opted to stay in the city of Hamburg and signed with local club Hamburg Crocodiles, a member of Germany's third-tier Oberliga, in June 2016 to serve as a team captain and join the club's front office. Schubert announced his retirement from hockey in June 2019.

== International play ==
Schubert played for the German national team in the 2002 Winter Olympics in Salt Lake City and the 2006 Winter Olympics in Turin. The team finished out of the medal round both times.

Schubert also attended the World Championships in 2002, 2005, 2008, 2009 and 2012 and participated in the 2004 World Cup of Hockey.

== Career statistics ==
=== Regular season and playoffs ===
			Regular season					Playoffs
Season	Team	League	GP	G	A	Pts	PIM	GP	G	A	Pts	PIM
1998–99	EV Landshut	DEU U20	28	15	20	35	77	—	—	—	—	—
1999–2000	EV Landshut	DEU U20	11	14	11	25	51	—	—	—	—	—
1999–2000	EV Landshut	DEU.3	55	7	5	12	68	—	—	—	—	—
2000–01	München Barons	DEL	55	6	3	9	80	10	0	2	2	27
2001–02	München Barons	DEL	50	5	11	16	125	9	3	4	7	32
2002–03	Binghamton Senators	AHL	70	2	8	10	102	8	0	1	1	2
2003–04	Binghamton Senators	AHL	70	2	10	12	69	1	0	0	0	0
2004–05	Binghamton Senators	AHL	76	10	22	32	110	6	2	2	4	20
2005–06	Ottawa Senators	NHL	56	4	6	10	48	7	0	1	1	4
2006–07	Ottawa Senators	NHL	80	8	17	25	56	20	0	1	1	22
2007–08	Ottawa Senators	NHL	82	8	16	24	64	4	0	0	0	8
2008–09	Ottawa Senators	NHL	50	3	3	6	26	—	—	—	—	—
2009–10	Atlanta Thrashers	NHL	47	2	5	7	69	—	—	—	—	—
2010–11	Frölunda HC	SEL	23	0	4	4	49	—	—	—	—	—
2010–11	Hamburg Freezers	DEL	26	3	14	17	20	—	—	—	—	—
2011–12	Hamburg Freezers	DEL	39	3	19	22	71	5	0	0	0	4
2012–13	Hamburg Freezers	DEL	39	5	16	21	76	6	0	2	2	18
2013–14	Hamburg Freezers	DEL	32	1	4	5	72	12	1	3	4	6
2014–15	Hamburg Freezers	DEL	48	5	18	23	82	7	0	1	1	35
2015–16	Hamburg Freezers	DEL	39	6	9	15	78	—	—	—	—	—
2016–17	Hamburg Crocodiles	DEU.3	41	12	65	77	142	4	1	6	7	16
2017–18	Hamburg Crocodiles	DEU.3	18	3	9	12	75	—	—	—	—	—
DEL totals			328	34	94	128	604	49	4	12	16	122
AHL totals			216	14	40	54	281	15	2	3	5	22
NHL totals			315	25	47	72	263	31	0	2	2	34

=== International ===
Year	Team	Event	GP	G	A	Pts	PIM
2000	Germany	WJC18	6	2	2	4	12
2001	Germany	WJC D1	5	1	1	2	10
2001	Germany	OGQ	3	0	0	0	0
2001	Germany	WC	1	0	0	0	0
2002	Germany	WJC D1	4	4	1	5	8
2002	Germany	OG	7	0	1	1	6
2002	Germany	WC	7	1	0	1	8
2004	Germany	WCH	2	0	0	0	6
2005	Germany	WC	3	0	4	4	6
2006	Germany	OG	5	0	1	1	2
2008	Germany	WC	6	1	2	3	12
2009	Germany	WC	4	2	0	2	6
2012	Germany	WC	7	1	2	3	2
Junior totals			15	7	4	11	30
Senior totals			42	5	10	15	48
