= Joonas Korpisalo =

Finnish ice hockey player (born 1994)

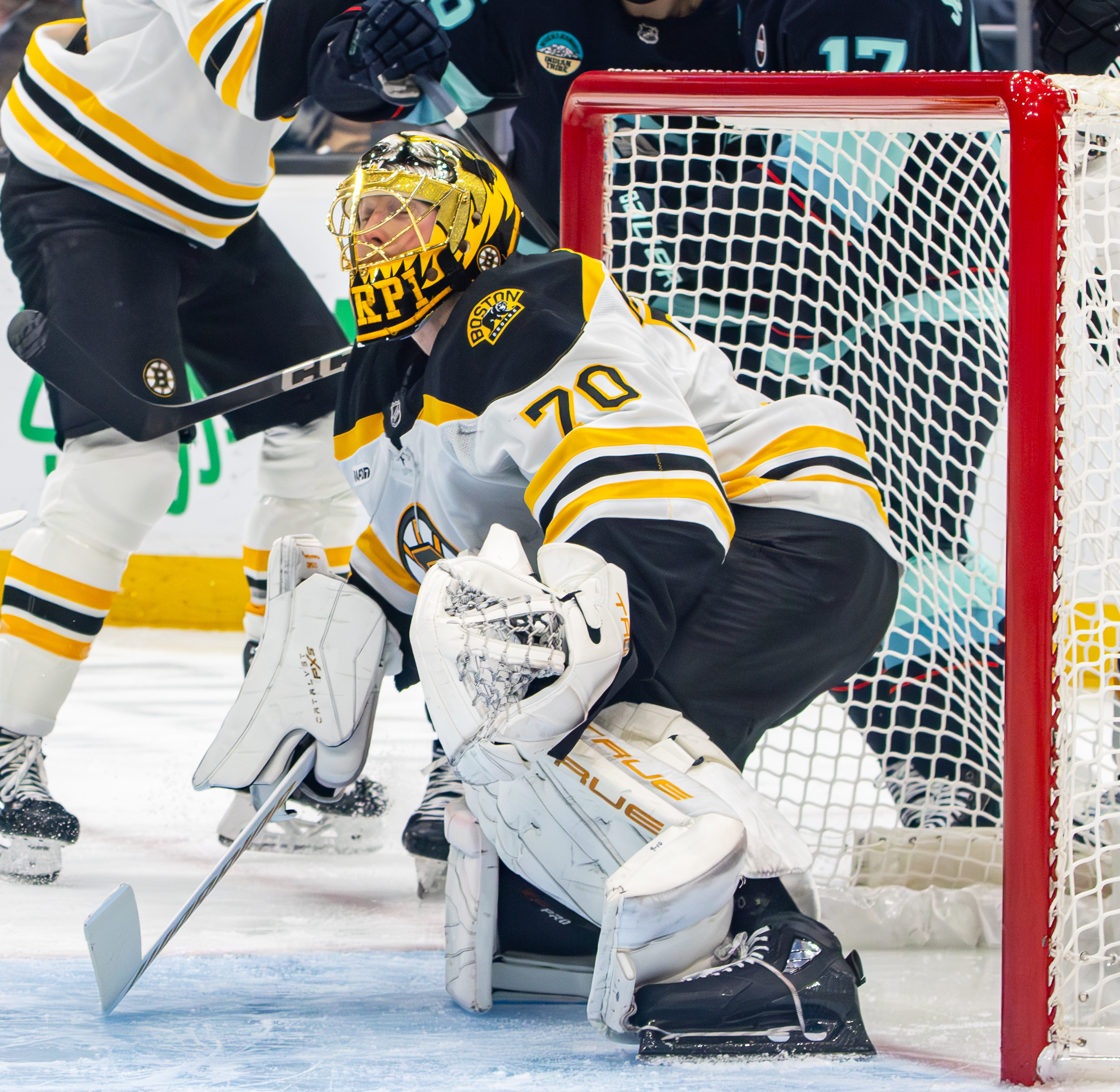
- Korpisalo with the Boston Bruins in 2024
- Born: 28 April 1994 (age 32) Pori, Finland
- Height: 6 ft 4 in (193 cm)
- Weight: 200 lb (91 kg; 14 st 4 lb)
- Position: Goaltender
- Catches: Left
- NHL team Former teams: New York Rangers; Jokerit; Ilves; Columbus Blue Jackets; Los Angeles Kings; Ottawa Senators; Boston Bruins
- National team: Finland
- NHL draft: 62nd overall, 2012; Columbus Blue Jackets
- Playing career: 2012–present

Joonas Korpisalo (Finnish pronunciation: [ˈjoːnɑs ˈkorpisɑlo]; born 28 April 1994) is a Finnish professional ice hockey player who is a goaltender for the New York Rangers of the National Hockey League (NHL). He previously played for the Columbus Blue Jackets, Los Angeles Kings, Ottawa Senators, and Boston Bruins.

== Playing career ==
Korpisalo played professionally in his native Finland in the SM-liiga during the 2012–13 and 2013–14 seasons for Jokerit and Ilves respectively.

=== Columbus Blue Jackets (2014–2023) ===
Korpisalo was selected by the Blue Jackets in the third round (62nd overall) of the 2012 NHL entry draft. On 21 March 2014, the Blue Jackets signed Korpisalo to a three-year, entry-level contract.

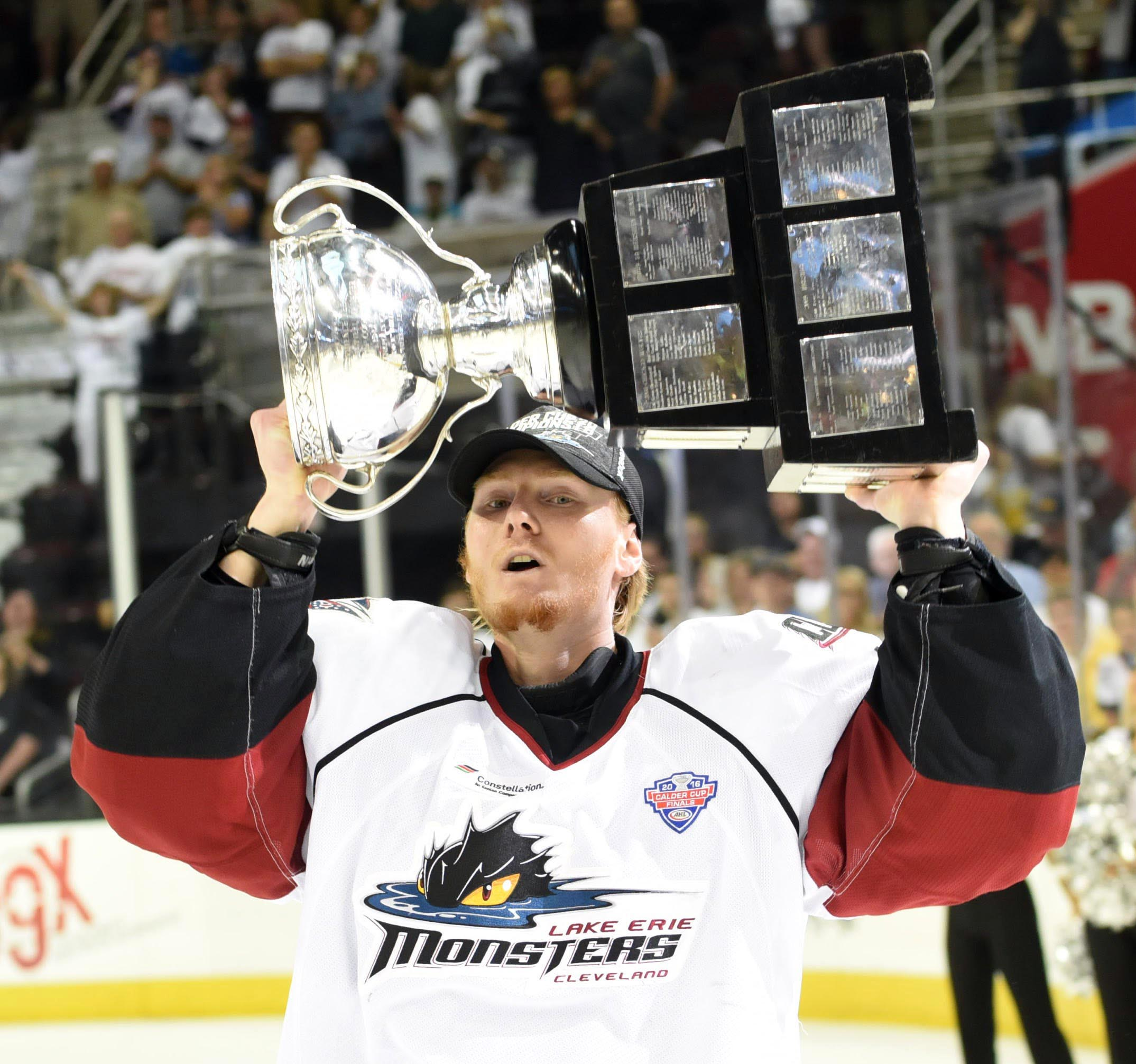
Korpisalo with the Calder Cup in 2016.

During the latter half of the 2016–17 NHL season, Korpisalo took over as the Blue Jackets' backup goaltender behind Sergei Bobrovsky. On 9 June 2017, the Blue Jackets signed Korpisalo to a two-year contract extension. When Bobrovsky left to the Florida Panthers in free agency before the 2019–20 season, Korpisalo became the Blue Jackets' starting goaltender. However, after injuring his knee in a shootout loss to the Chicago Blackhawks on 29 December, rookie goaltender Elvis Merzļikins started in his absence.

On 17 April 2020, Korpisalo signed a two-year contract extension worth $5.6 million to stay with the Blue Jackets.

Korpisalo hung onto the starting job for the 2020 Stanley Cup playoffs, and made his NHL playoff debut for the Blue Jackets on 2 August 2020. Korpisalo did not allow a goal against the Toronto Maple Leafs in a 2–0 victory, the first Blue Jackets goaltender to record a shutout in the playoffs. On 9 August 2020, Korpisalo would again shut out the Maple Leafs by a 3–0 score, eliminating them from the playoffs and securing a series win for the Blue Jackets. In game one of the Blue Jackets' first-round series, Korpisalo set a modern NHL record for saves in a single game with 85, despite a 3–2 defeat in quintuple overtime versus the Tampa Bay Lightning. His performance surpassed the previous modern record of 73 by Kelly Hrudey in the Easter Epic 33 years prior, and was eight short of the all-time record of 92 set by Detroit Red Wings goaltender Normie Smith in the 1936 NHL playoffs.

=== Los Angeles Kings (2023) ===
During the 2022–23 season, his ninth season within the Blue Jackets organization, Korpisalo was traded with Vladislav Gavrikov to the Los Angeles Kings in exchange for Jonathan Quick, a conditional first-round pick in 2023, and a third-round pick in 2024 on 1 March 2023. Acquired to assume the role as the Kings starting goaltender, Korpisalo had an impressive end to the regular season in collecting 7 wins through 11 appearances. In the post-season, Korpisalo was unable to help the Kings advance past the first round, losing in six games against the Edmonton Oilers.

=== Ottawa Senators (2023–2024) ===
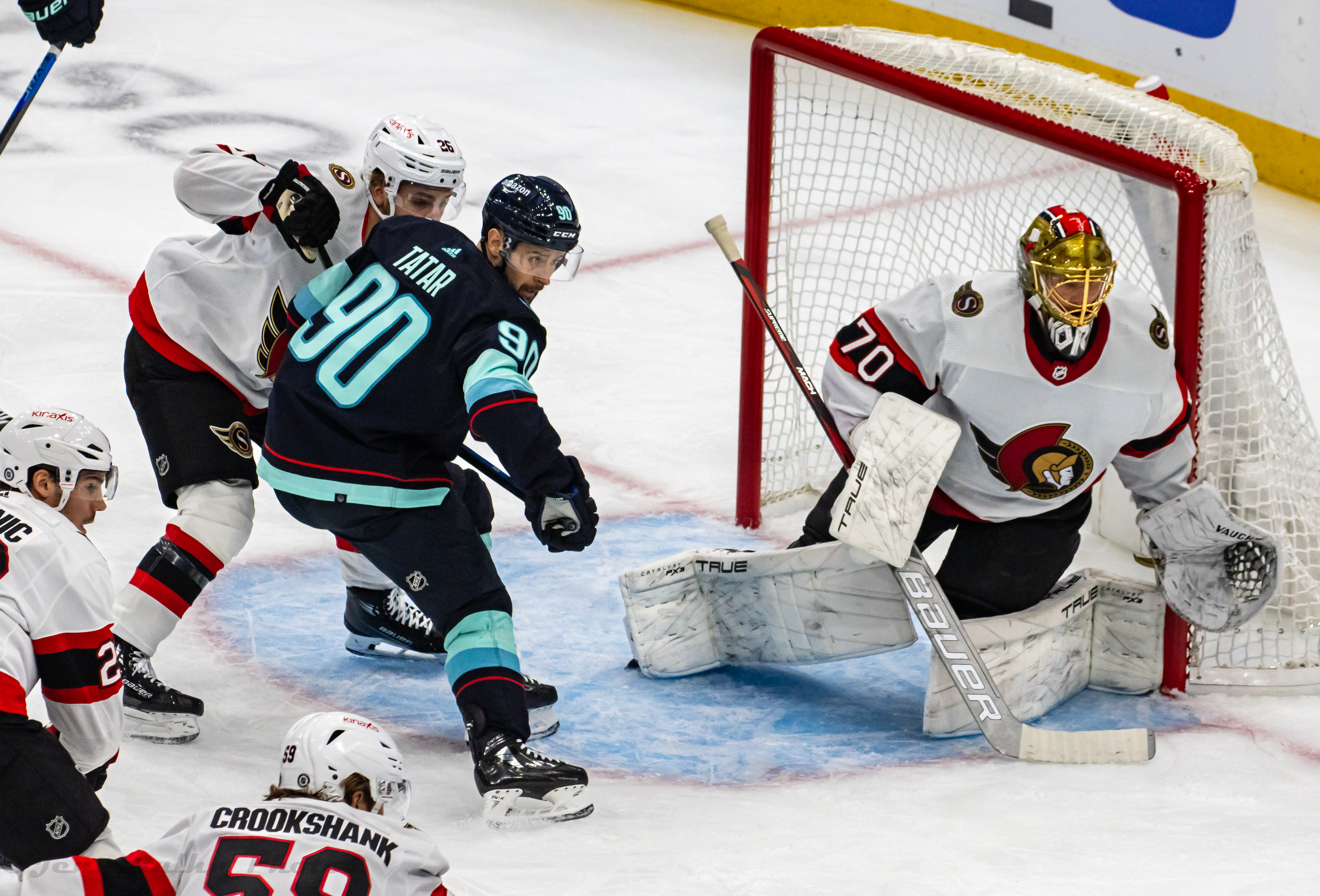
Korpisalo in action against the Seattle Kraken in 2024.

As a free agent at the conclusion of his contract with the Kings, Korpisalo was signed on the opening day of free agency to a five-year, $20 million contract with the Ottawa Senators on 1 July 2023.

=== Boston Bruins (2024–2026) ===
On 24 June 2024, Korpisalo was traded alongside Mark Kastelic and a 2024 first-round pick to the Boston Bruins, in exchange for Linus Ullmark.

Korpisalo was slated to be the backup to fellow netminder Jeremy Swayman for the 2024–25 season. However, due to contract negotiations between the Bruins and Swayman, it caused Swayman to miss training camp, and as a result, Korpisalo was given the nod to start on Opening Night for the Bruins. Korpisalo and the Bruins lost the first game, 6–4, to the Florida Panthers. Just a few games later, in his second start for the Bruins, Korpisalo earned his first win in the black and gold, a 5–3 victory over the Colorado Avalanche. He earned his first shutout as a Bruin on 2 November 2024, in a 3–0 win over the Philadelphia Flyers. Korpisalo proved himself to be a solid backup for the Bruins in what many saw as a bounceback season for him. Many even saw him as having potential to take the starting job away from Swayman, due to both the Bruins and Swayman's struggles. Korpisalo finished the season 11–10–3 in 27 games, with a 2.90 GAA, and a career high three shutouts. On 11 April 2025, Korpisalo was named the Bruins nominee for the Bill Masterton Memorial Trophy, awarded to players who "exemplify perseverance, sportsmanship and dedication to hockey."

=== New York Rangers (2026–present) ===
On 1 July 2026, Korpisalo was traded to the New York Rangers in exchange for Kalle Väisänen and a 2028 fourth-round draft pick.

== International play ==
Medal record

Men's ice hockey

Representing Finland

Winter Olympics
Bronze medal – third place	2026 Milano Cortina	

World Championships
Gold medal – first place	2026 Switzerland	

He represented Finland at the 2026 Winter Olympics and won a bronze medal.

== Personal life ==
Korpisalo is the son of Jari Korpisalo who played as a forward in the SM-liiga.

== Career statistics ==
=== Regular season and playoffs ===
			Regular season									Playoffs
Season	Team	League	GP	W	L	T/OT	MIN	GA	SO	GAA	SV%	GP	W	L	MIN	GA	SO	GAA	SV%
2012–13	Jokerit	SM-l	1	0	0	0	15	0	0	0.00	1.000	—	—	—	—	—	—	—	—
2012–13	Kiekko-Vantaa	Mestis	18	—	—	—	997	45	0	2.71	.900	—	—	—	—	—	—	—	—
2013–14	Jokerit	Liiga	1	0	1	0	34	3	0	5.34	.813	—	—	—	—	—	—	—	—
2013–14	Kiekko-Vantaa	Mestis	4	—	—	—	199	11	0	3.31	.895	—	—	—	—	—	—	—	—
2013–14	Ilves	Liiga	8	3	1	0	337	8	1	1.42	.957	—	—	—	—	—	—	—	—
2013–14	LeKi	Mestis	2	—	—	—	68	7	0	6.13	.851	—	—	—	—	—	—	—	—
2014–15	Ilves	Liiga	38	14	13	7	2132	83	2	2.34	.919	2	0	2	193	4	0	1.24	.951
2014–15	Springfield Falcons	AHL	3	0	2	0	169	9	0	3.20	.878	—	—	—	—	—	—	—	—
2015–16	Lake Erie Monsters	AHL	18	8	8	4	1066	42	2	2.36	.913	9	6	2	506	25	0	2.96	.898
2015–16	Columbus Blue Jackets	NHL	31	16	11	4	1803	78	0	2.60	.920	—	—	—	—	—	—	—	—
2016–17	Cleveland Monsters	AHL	16	7	6	5	935	42	0	2.69	.907	—	—	—	—	—	—	—	—
2016–17	Columbus Blue Jackets	NHL	14	7	5	1	791	38	1	2.88	.905	—	—	—	—	—	—	—	—
2017–18	Columbus Blue Jackets	NHL	18	8	8	1	1049	58	0	3.32	.897	—	—	—	—	—	—	—	—
2017–18	Cleveland Monsters	AHL	8	3	4	1	479	18	0	2.26	.924	—	—	—	—	—	—	—	—
2018–19	Columbus Blue Jackets	NHL	27	10	7	3	1361	67	0	2.95	.897	—	—	—	—	—	—	—	—
2019–20	Columbus Blue Jackets	NHL	37	19	12	5	2126	92	2	2.60	.911	9	3	5	599	19	2	1.90	.941
2019–20	Cleveland Monsters	AHL	1	1	0	0	62	2	0	1.95	.941	—	—	—	—	—	—	—	—
2020–21	Columbus Blue Jackets	NHL	33	9	13	7	1747	96	0	3.30	.894	—	—	—	—	—	—	—	—
2021–22	Columbus Blue Jackets	NHL	22	7	11	0	1129	78	0	4.15	.877	—	—	—	—	—	—	—	—
2022–23	Cleveland Monsters	AHL	1	1	0	0	60	2	0	2.00	.950	—	—	—	—	—	—	—	—
2022–23	Columbus Blue Jackets	NHL	28	11	11	3	1551	81	0	3.13	.913	—	—	—	—	—	—	—	—
2022–23	Los Angeles Kings	NHL	11	7	3	1	621	22	1	2.13	.921	6	2	4	351	22	0	3.77	.892
2023–24	Ottawa Senators	NHL	55	21	26	4	3080	168	0	3.27	.890	—	—	—	—	—	—	—	—
2024–25	Boston Bruins	NHL	27	11	10	3	1530	74	3	2.90	.893	—	—	—	—	—	—	—	—
2025–26	Boston Bruins	NHL	31	14	9	6	1713	90	1	3.15	.894	1	0	0	13	0	0	0.00	1.000
NHL totals			334	140	126	38	18,500	943	8	3.06	.900	16	5	9	963	41	2	2.56	.922

=== International ===
Year	Team	Event	Result	GP	W	L	T	MIN	GA	SO	GAA	SV%
2013	Finland	WJC	7th	5	3	2	0	303	17	0	3.36	.858
2017	Finland	WC	4th	6	3	2	1	303	17	0	3.32	.897
2026	Finland	WC	1st place, gold medalist(s)	2	2	0	0	120	1	1	0.50	.947
Junior totals				5	3	2	0	303	17	0	3.36	.858
Senior totals				8	5	2	1	423	18	1	2.55	.876

== Awards and honors ==
Awards	Year
AHL
Calder Cup champion	2016
NHL
NHL All-Star Game	2020
