= Bernd Truntschka =

German ice hockey player

Personal information
- Nationality: German
- Born: 7 August 1965 (age 59); Landshut, West Germany

Sport
- Sport: Ice hockey

Bernd Truntschka (born 7 August 1965) is a German former ice hockey player. He competed in the men's tournaments at the 1988 Winter Olympics, the 1992 Winter Olympics and the 1994 Winter Olympics.
