= Bernhard Englbrecht =

German ice hockey player and coach

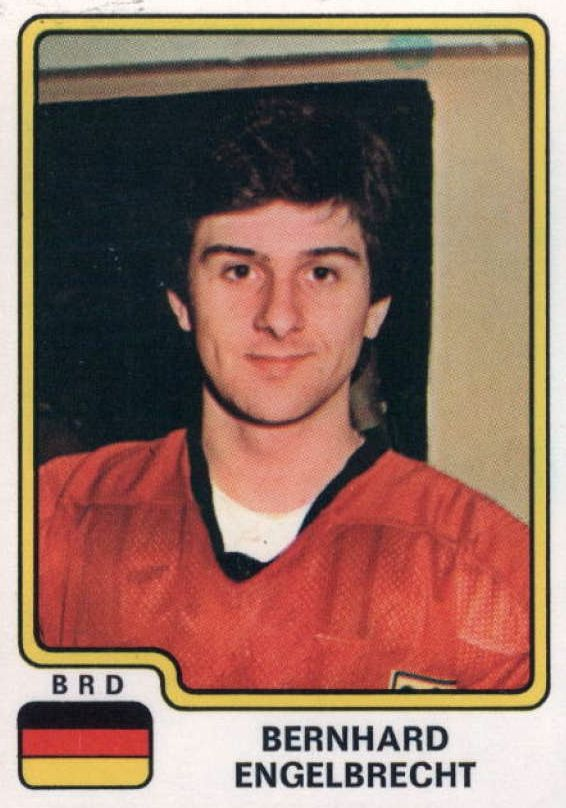
- Born: February 16, 1958 (age 67); Landshut, West Germany
- Height: 5 ft 8 in (173 cm)
- Weight: 152 lb (69 kg; 10 st 12 lb)
- Position: Goaltender
- Caught: Left
- Played for: EV Landshut; SC Riessersee; EHC Essen-West; EHC 80 Nürnberg; TSV Erding
- National team: West Germany
- NHL draft: 196th overall, 1978; Atlanta Flames
- Playing career: 1979–2000

Bernhard Englbrecht (born February 16, 1958, in Landshut) is a German former professional ice hockey goaltender and coach. He was selected by the Atlanta Flames in the 12th round (196th overall) of the 1978 NHL Amateur Draft.

== Career ==
Englbrecht began his coaching career in 2001 with EV Landshut. He was a coach with the Germany men's national ice hockey team at the 2001 IIHF World Championship.

Englbrecht took over the head coaching duties for the Straubing Tigers during the 2010–11 DEL season.

Between December 2015 and January 2017 he had the position of head coach at EV Landshut.
