= Markus Hundhammer =

German ice hockey player

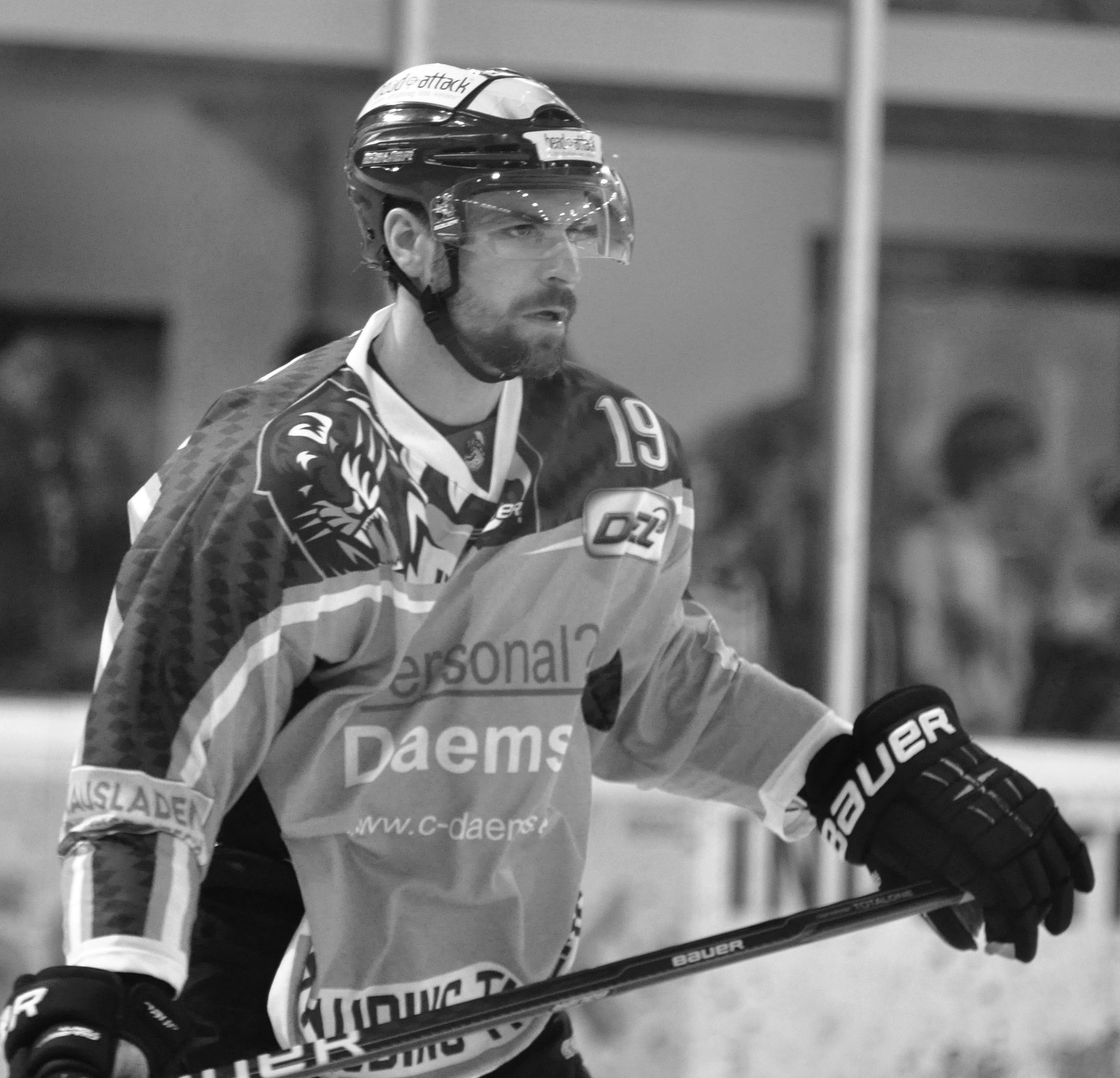
- Born: April 24, 1980 (age 44); Landshut, West Germany
- Height: 6 ft 2 in (188 cm)
- Weight: 187 lb (85 kg; 13 st 5 lb)
- Position: Centre
- Shoots: Right
- DEL team Former teams: Free Agent; Straubing Tigers
- NHL draft: Undrafted
- Playing career: 2002–present

Markus Hundhammer (born September 19, 1980) is a German professional ice hockey player. He is currently an Unrestricted Free Agent. He most recently played for the Straubing Tigers in the Deutsche Eishockey Liga (DEL).
