= Jari Levonen =

Former ice hockey player and referee

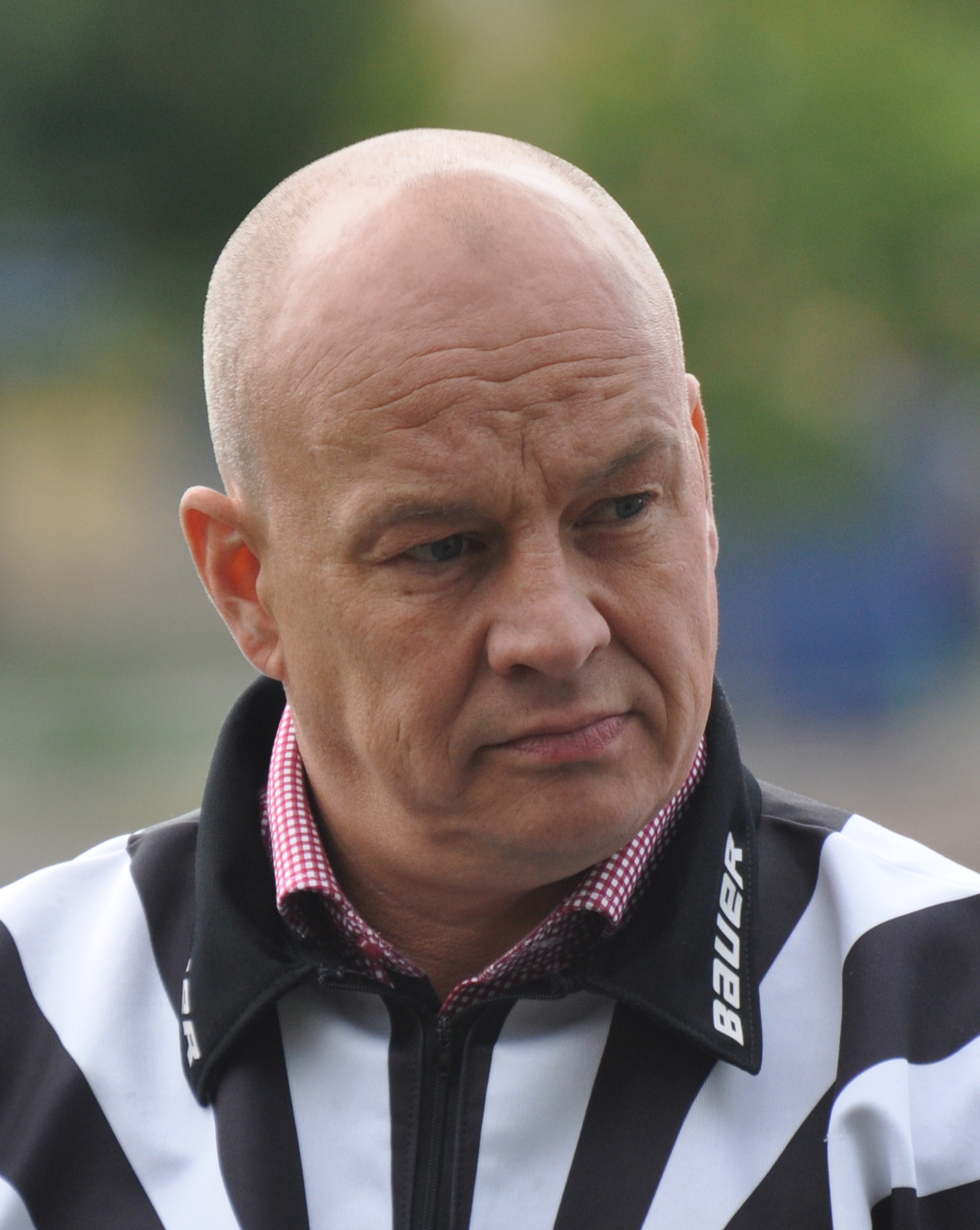
- Jari Levonen in 2013
- Born: August 23, 1966 (age 58); Pori, Finland
- Height: 177 cm (5 ft 10 in)
- Weight: 83 kg (183 lb; 13 st 1 lb)
- Position: Winger
- Shot: Left
- Played for: Jokipojat; Porin Ässät
- Playing career: 1985–1999

Jari "Japa" Levonen (Born: 23 August 1966) is a Finnish former professional ice hockey winger and referee. Levonen represented the Porin Ässät and the Jokipojat during his player career. He has won the golden Whistle award 15 times in the SM-liiga, being the best referee voted by players 15 times in a row between 2002 and 2017. He has also won the Unto Wiitala trophy seven times as the best referee in Finland decided by SM-liiga's referee coaching group. Levonen has the second most whistled games in the SM-liiga with 979, only behind Timo Favorin. Levonen retired in 2020, but has officiated in preseason games.

== Playing career ==
Levonen played 459 matches in his SM-liiga career, which ended with an injury, all in the Porin Ässät. In his playing career, Levonen scored 101 goals and 89 assists. He sat in the penalty box for 691 minutes. In the playoffs, the corresponding statistics were 38 matches, 9 goals and 7 assists and 46 penalty minutes.

== Referee career ==
In the spring of 2017, he was awarded the Golden Whistle for the fifteenth time in a row as the best referee voted by the players. In January 2019, Levonen refereed the 900th SM-liiga match of his career. He reached that mark as the second referee ever. The SM-liiga has awarded him with the Unto Wiitala award seven times.

Levonen has officiated in the 2006 and the 2010 IIHF World Championships.

== Personal life ==
Levonen is related to former ice hockey players, Rauli Levonen, Jarno Levonen, Toni Levonen, Ari-Pekka Levonen, Jarkko Levonen, Jyrki Levonen and Harri Levonen.

Levonen is married to politician Mari Kaunistola.

Jari Levonen got an invite to the Independence Day Reception at the Presidential palace on the Finnish independence day on the 6th of December 2023.
