= Wade Redden =

Canadian ice hockey player (born 1977)

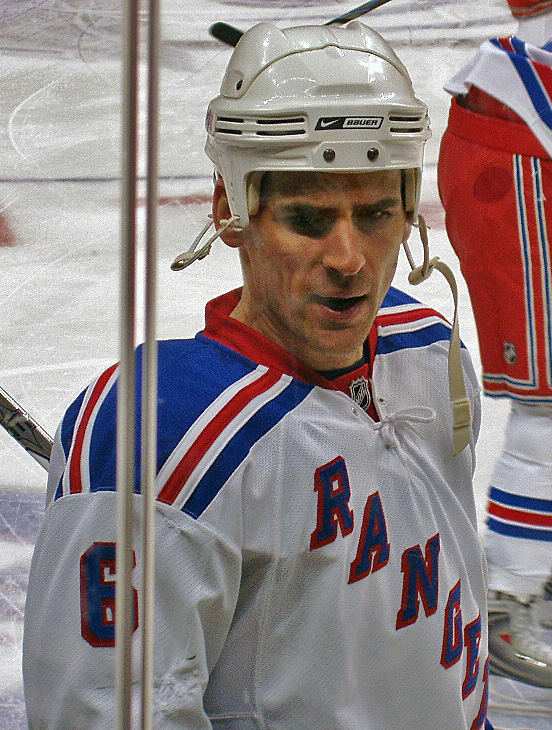
- Redden with the New York Rangers in 2008
- Born: June 12, 1977 (age 49) Lloydminster, Saskatchewan, Canada
- Height: 6 ft 2 in (188 cm)
- Weight: 209 lb (95 kg; 14 st 13 lb)
- Position: Defence
- Shot: Left
- Played for: Ottawa Senators; New York Rangers; St. Louis Blues; Boston Bruins
- National team: Canada
- NHL draft: 2nd overall, 1995; New York Islanders
- Playing career: 1996–2013

Wade Redden (born June 12, 1977) is a Canadian former professional ice hockey player and a development coach of the Ottawa Senators, with whom he spent the majority of his career in the National Hockey League (NHL), which lasted from 1996 to 2013. He also played for the New York Rangers, St. Louis Blues and Boston Bruins. He played for the Canadian national team internationally seven times, winning two gold medals in the World Junior Championships and one in the World Cup of Hockey. He was a two-time NHL All-Star.

== Early life ==
Born on June 12, 1977, in Lloydminster, Saskatchewan, Redden, who is Métis, grew up in Hillmond, Saskatchewan. Redden went to school at Hillmond, where he completed kindergarten to grade nine. He went to Lloydminster comprehensive school for grade ten. He then completed his 11th and 12th year in Brandon, Manitoba at Crocus Plains Regional High School while playing for the Brandon Wheat Kings. Redden has an older sister Nikki, and an older brother, Bart making him the youngest of three.

== Playing career ==
=== Junior ===
Redden played minor hockey with the teams at Hillmond High School, and the Mid West Red Wings, which were from the rural area. After that, he played one year with the Lloydminster Blazers, before joining the Western Hockey League (WHL)'s Brandon Wheat Kings for the 1993–94 season. In his first year of major junior hockey with Brandon, he was awarded the Jim Piggott Memorial Trophy for WHL rookie of the year honours. The Wheat Kings made it to two Memorial Cup appearances, in 1995 and 1996, whilst Redden was a member of the team. He was also a member of the 1995 and 1996 Canadian teams at the World Junior Hockey Championships, both teams winning gold medals.

=== Pre-Senators ===
Redden was originally selected second overall by the New York Islanders in the 1995 NHL entry draft, but never played for the team – he was traded in a three-team deal with the Ottawa Senators and Toronto Maple Leafs that saw his rights, along with Kirk Muller, Ken Belanger, Damian Rhodes, Don Beaupre, Martin Straka and the rights to Bryan Berard move between the teams on January 23, 1996. The trade had become necessary when the Senators' efforts to sign Berard, whom they had selected first overall in the same draft, had become futile.

=== Ottawa Senators ===
Redden joined the Senators from the Wheat Kings for the 1996–97 season, making the team out of his first training camp. He scored his first career NHL goal on his first shot, against Jocelyn Thibault of the Montreal Canadiens on October 5, 1996. Redden would be named NHL Rookie of the Month for April 1997, and was an important part of the team's drive to qualify for the Stanley Cup playoffs that season; The appearance was the first in modern Senators' history.

By the 1999–2000 season, Redden was an important part of the team. On October 2, 1999, he was named alternate captain of the Senators, a position he eventually held for nine seasons. Near the end of the season, however, he suffered an ankle injury, forcing him to miss the 2000 playoffs, a contributing factor in the Senators losing in the first round to the Toronto Maple Leafs. Despite the injury setback, the following year Redden continued his improvement, averaging over 25 minutes of ice time per game, scoring 37 assists, recording a three-point game as well as several two-point games. After the Senators were eliminated from the 2001 playoffs, he was named to the Team Canada's senior team for the first time for the 2001 IIHF World Championship.

The next year, 2001–02, Redden was named to the 2002 NHL All-Star Game to represent the Senators. In the next season, he would have nine multi-point games in 2002–03 and would set a personal best of 17 goals in the following 2003–04 season, which helped earn him a spot in the 2004 NHL All-Star Game. He was also named to the gold medal-winning Canadian team for the 2004 World Cup of Hockey, and would also play for Canada in the 2005 IIHF World Championship.

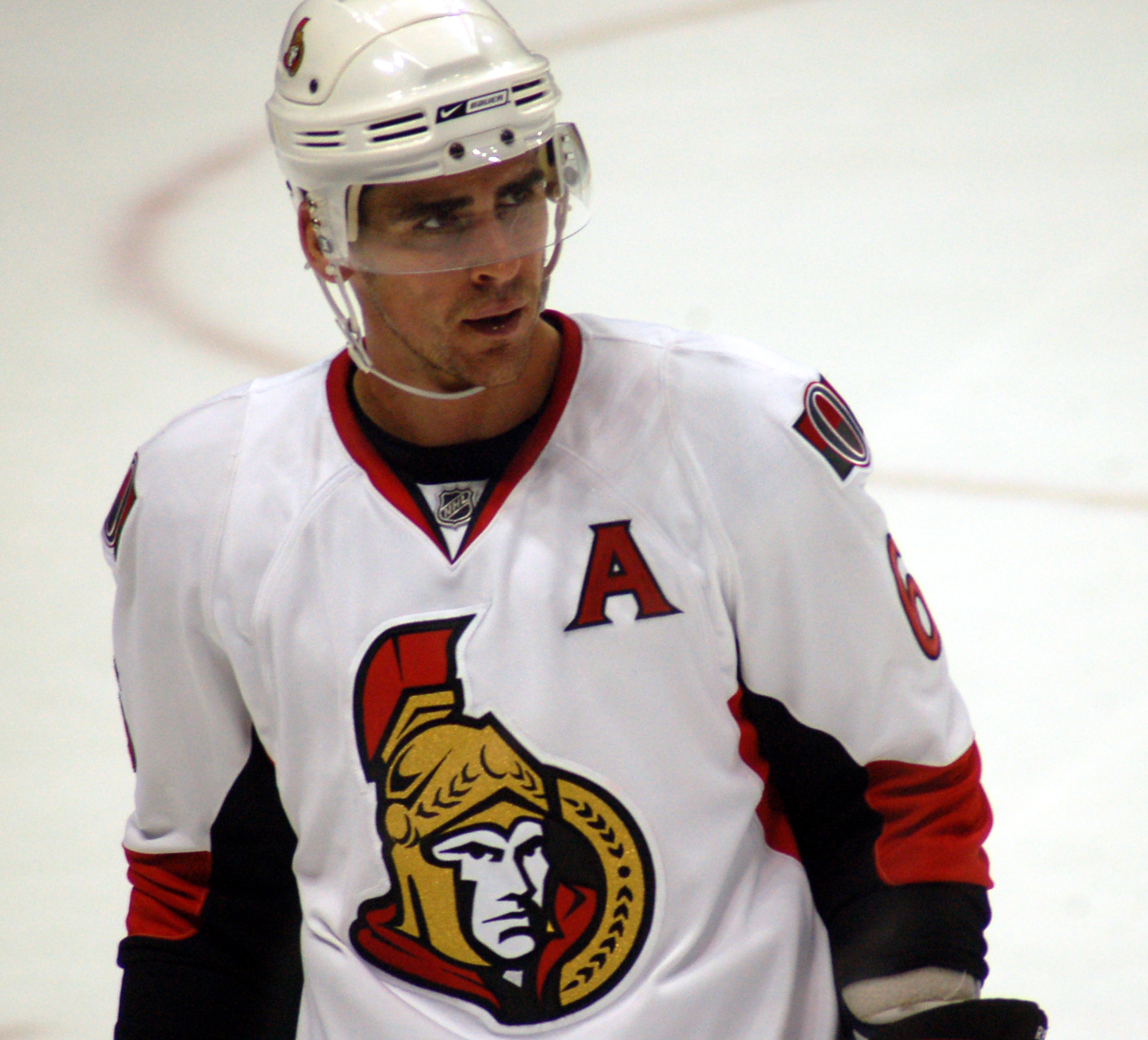
Redden with the Ottawa Senators, 2007.

In the 2005–06 season, Redden missed games due to a knee injury and to be with his mother, Pat, as she battled cancer. He finished the season with a career-high 50 points and a joint-NHL-leading plus-minus rating of +35 in 65 games. He also had 12 multi-point games, including a four-point game against the New York Rangers on December 26, 2005. For his career-season, Redden was selected to Team Canada's roster, along with teammate Dany Heatley, for the 2006 Winter Olympics in Turin.

After the 2005–06 season, the Senators were faced with having their two top defencemen (Redden and Zdeno Chára) becoming unrestricted free agents, and having to choose to sign only one to keep the team salaries within the League-mandated salary cap. The Senators ultimately chose to retain Redden, and the two agreed on a two-year, $13 million contract with a no-trade clause; Chára signed instead with the Boston Bruins. Redden's salary made him the highest-paid player on the team, and the media and fans expected another top-notch season. Redden being of Metis descent, was noted to be the highest paid aboriginal player in the NHL. The 2006–07 NHL season was a difficult one for Redden, however, playing with a new defensive partner, Andrej Meszároš, who had previously played on a defensive pair alongside Chára. Despite the initial struggles, by the time of the 2007 playoffs, Redden and Meszároš had jelled and were a strong pairing for the Senators. Redden participated in all of Ottawa's run to the Stanley Cup Finals, recording 10 points in 20 playoff games, albeit in a losing effort as the Senators eventually lost to the Anaheim Ducks in five games.

The 2007–08 was eventful for Redden. Newly promoted general manager Bryan Murray attempted to trade Redden to the Edmonton Oilers during the 2007 NHL entry draft. Redden turned down the trade proposal. Trade rumours would swirl around Redden for most of the season, though he remained a starter with the team and played in his 800th career NHL game on January 10, 2008, against the Buffalo Sabres. As the team began to slump, Murray started to look for solutions to turn the team around. In February 2008, it was revealed that Redden used the no-trade clause in his contract to kill a deal that would have sent him to the San Jose Sharks in exchange for Matt Carle and a draft pick. As the leaked deal became public, Redden publicly declared his desire to win the Stanley Cup with Ottawa, at the time still the Eastern Conference leader. Within weeks of the aborted trade, the Sharks surpassed Ottawa in the League-wide standings, and the Senators performance continued to decline; the coach was eventually fired and the team struggled into the playoffs.

Redden's numbers improved slightly over the previous season, but this was overshadowed by the size of his contract and the team's overall performance. The 2007–08 season was also the last season of the contract and speculation about his re-signing was regularly discussed in the media. Redden made clear that he would take a "hometown discount", taking less money to stay in Ottawa. After the season, the media openly speculated that Redden would be leaving the Senators.

=== New York Rangers ===
On July 1, 2008, Redden signed a six-year, $39 million contract as an unrestricted free agent with the New York Rangers. Redden's performance continued to decline in New York, where he faced considerable criticism – one writer for the New York Post even called the contract "the worst in the history of the NHL, if not in the history of hard-cap pro sports." On September 25, 2010, the Rangers placed Redden on waivers in part due to the defenceman's declining play. The move also allowed the Rangers to fit under salary cap. Speaking in 2013 on his stint with the Rangers, Redden said, "I think maybe making that money there and being the player I am… I felt like the first little while, things were going pretty good, and then they kind of fell off. I felt like I wasn't doing enough, and like I should have been doing more. Once I started feeling that way, I think I just got away from the things that made me successful. Things just kind of snowballed from there."

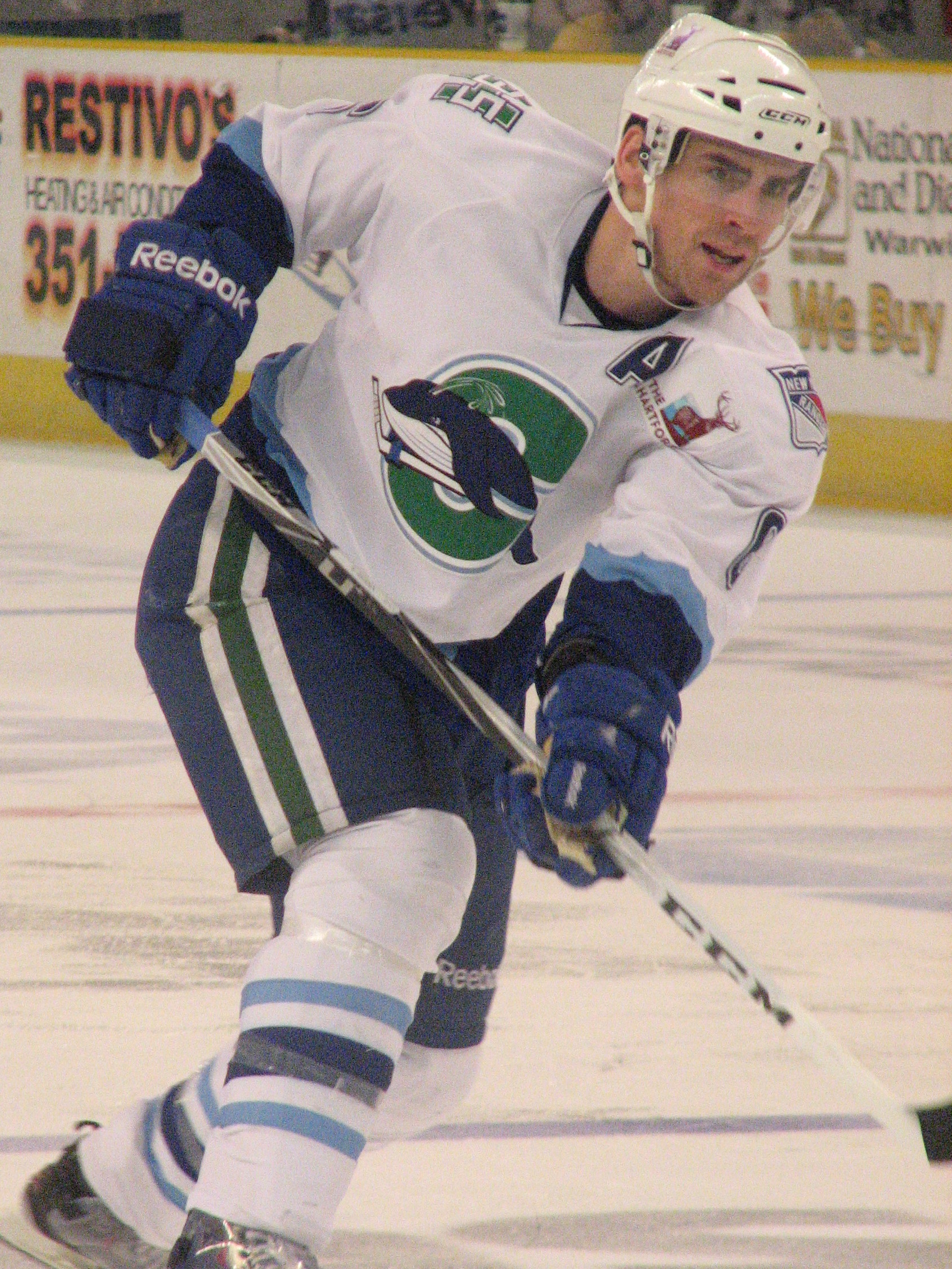
Redden with the Connecticut Whale in 2011

Redden cleared waivers and was assigned to the Rangers' American Hockey League (AHL) affiliate, the Hartford Wolf Pack, becoming the highest-paid player in the history of the AHL in the process. Redden admitted contemplating retirement after the demotion, though he ultimately decided to report and play for Hartford. Of Redden's ill-fated signing with the Rangers, one newspaper later commented that "through no fault of his own, [Redden] has become the poster-boy for free-agent foolishness." In the 2011–12 season, Redden served as the captain of the Connecticut Whale, the Wolf Pack's new name.

==== 2012–13 lockout ====
At the time of the 2012–13 NHL lockout, the Rangers decided not to transfer Redden to the AHL roster, thereby not having to pay his salary during the labour dispute. When the lockout was settled, however, the newly ratified NHL Collective Bargaining Agreement (CBA) directly affected Redden in two ways: 1) It forced teams to count any AHL player's salary above $900,000 against its NHL cap; and 2) It allowed for up to two contracts per team to be bought out for up to two-thirds of the remaining salary, without the buyout counting against the cap in the 2013 and/or 2014 off-seasons, so as to help teams get under the reduced cap, also known as a compliance buyout. However, the buyouts cannot be used on injured players, so, to avoid any risk of a hockey-related injury, the Rangers originally instructed Redden to simply not report to camp.

While this meant that Redden (along with Scott Gomez of the Montreal Canadiens, who was in a similar situation) would still have been paid his prorated 2012–13 salary despite not playing, the NHL Players' Association (NHLPA) was concerned that for Redden and Gomez to be forced to spend an entire year away from hockey would adversely affect their ability to find employment elsewhere in the NHL during the 2013 off-season, even at a much reduced salary. On January 15, in order to avoid this process, the CBA was revised to allow teams to use one of their two compliance buyouts prior to the start of the shortened 2012–13 season, with the provision that the players bought-out in such a way would still be paid their prorated but otherwise full 2012–13 salaries (which would still count against the 2012–13 cap), and with the buyout of the subsequent years otherwise proceeding as originally intended.

With the revised Agreement in place, Redden was waived by the Rangers on January 16, 2013, and cleared waivers the following day. After a compliance buyout from the Rangers was completed, Redden became a free agent for the first time since 2008.

=== Return to NHL ===
On January 18, 2013, the eve of the shortened 2012–13 season, Redden signed a one-year, $800,000 contract with the St. Louis Blues. The Blues activated Redden on January 23, opening the door for him to play the following night against the Nashville Predators. To make room for Redden, the Blues demoted Ian Cole to the Peoria Rivermen of the AHL. On January 24, against Nashville, Redden played his first NHL game since April 11, 2010. He scored his first goal back against the Dallas Stars on January 26, and played his 1,000th career NHL game on February 7, against the Detroit Red Wings.

At the 2013 NHL trade deadline, Redden was traded to the Boston Bruins in exchange for a conditional seventh-round pick in 2014 on April 3. The Bruins hoped he would rediscover the chemistry he had with former Senators teammate Zdeno Chára and return to elite form, though he was a non-factor for the Bruins. In six regular season games with the Bruins, Redden scored one goal and had one assist. In the first game of the conference quarterfinals series of the 2013 Stanley Cup playoffs, Redden scored a goal and added an assist in the Bruins' 4–1 victory over the Toronto Maple Leafs.

On January 9, 2014, Redden announced his retirement from professional ice hockey.

== Post-playing career ==
On June 27, 2016, Redden joined the Nashville Predators organization as assistant director of player development, specifically to evaluate prospects and ease their transition to the NHL with mentorship.

On July 11, 2022, Redden was named as the development coach for the Ottawa Senators.

== Personal life ==
Redden sponsored a suite at Scotiabank Place, named Wade's World and reserved for critically and terminally ill children, while a member of the Senators from 1997 until 2008. He was also involved with the charity 65 Roses Club, which is committed to raising money for cystic fibrosis research. Redden also appeared in Road Hockey Rumble in his hometown. In 2015, Redden was honoured by the Brandon Wheat Kings as he was awarded for alumni achievement and was recognized as one of the WHL's top 125 players of all time. Redden then partook in the Wheat Kings' home opener and dropped the puck for the ceremonial face-off.

During the off-season, Redden and his wife spent time in their home near Kelowna, British Columbia. After two years of involvement, the couple became engaged in September 2007 and married in August 2008. Redden and his wife have three daughters.

== Career statistics ==
=== Regular season and playoffs ===
			Regular season					Playoffs
Season	Team	League	GP	G	A	Pts	PIM	GP	G	A	Pts	PIM
1992–93	Lloydminster Blazers	AJHL	34	4	11	15	64	—	—	—	—	—
1993–94	Brandon Wheat Kings	WHL	64	4	35	39	98	14	2	4	6	10
1994–95	Brandon Wheat Kings	WHL	64	14	46	60	83	18	5	10	15	8
1995–96	Brandon Wheat Kings	WHL	51	9	45	54	55	19	5	10	15	19
1996–97	Ottawa Senators	NHL	82	6	24	30	41	7	1	3	4	2
1997–98	Ottawa Senators	NHL	80	8	14	22	27	9	0	2	2	2
1998–99	Ottawa Senators	NHL	72	8	21	29	54	4	1	2	3	2
1999–00	Ottawa Senators	NHL	81	10	26	36	49	—	—	—	—	—
2000–01	Ottawa Senators	NHL	78	10	37	47	49	4	0	0	0	0
2001–02	Ottawa Senators	NHL	79	9	25	34	48	12	3	2	5	6
2002–03	Ottawa Senators	NHL	76	10	35	45	70	18	1	8	9	10
2003–04	Ottawa Senators	NHL	81	17	26	43	65	7	1	0	1	2
2005–06	Ottawa Senators	NHL	65	10	40	50	63	9	2	8	10	10
2006–07	Ottawa Senators	NHL	64	7	29	36	50	20	3	7	10	10
2007–08	Ottawa Senators	NHL	80	6	32	38	60	4	0	1	1	11
2008–09	New York Rangers	NHL	81	3	23	26	51	7	0	2	2	0
2009–10	New York Rangers	NHL	75	2	12	14	27	—	—	—	—	—
2010–11	Hartford Wolf Pack	AHL	70	8	34	42	46	6	0	6	6	0
2011–12	Connecticut Whale	AHL	49	4	16	20	26	9	0	1	1	8
2012–13	St. Louis Blues	NHL	23	2	3	5	11	—	—	—	—	—
2012–13	Boston Bruins	NHL	6	1	1	2	0	5	1	1	2	0
NHL totals			1,023	109	348	457	665	106	13	36	49	55

=== International ===
Medal record

Representing Canada

Ice hockey

World Championships
Silver medal – second place	2005 Vienna	

World Cup of Hockey
Gold medal – first place	2004 Canada	

World Junior Championships
Gold medal – first place	1995 Alberta	
Gold medal – first place	1996 Massachusetts	

Year	Team	Event	GP	G	A	Pts	PIM
1995	Canada	WJC	7	3	2	5	0
1996	Canada	WJC	6	0	2	2	0
1999	Canada	WC	10	1	2	3	6
2001	Canada	WC	7	0	3	3	25
2004	Canada	WCH	2	0	1	1	0
2005	Canada	WC	9	2	3	5	2
2006	Canada	OLY	6	1	0	1	0
Junior totals			13	3	4	7	0
Senior totals			34	4	9	13	35

== Awards and honours ==
Award	Year
CHL/WHL
Jim Piggott Memorial Trophy	1994
WHL East First All-Star Team	1996
WHL East Second All-Star Team	1995
Memorial Cup All-Star Team	1996
NHL
All-Star Game	2002, 2004 (did not play due to flu)
Plus-Minus Award	2006 (shared with Michal Rozsíval)
New York Rangers
Victoria Cup winner	2008
International
Best Defenceman	2005

Preceded by Brett Lindros	New York Islanders first-round draft pick 1995	Succeeded by Jean-Pierre Dumont
Preceded by Martin St. Louis, Marek Malík	Co-winner of the NHL Plus-Minus Award; 2006; With: Michal Rozsíval	Succeeded by Thomas Vanek
