= Martin St. Louis =

Canadian ice hockey player (born 1975)

- Hockey Hall of Fame, 2018
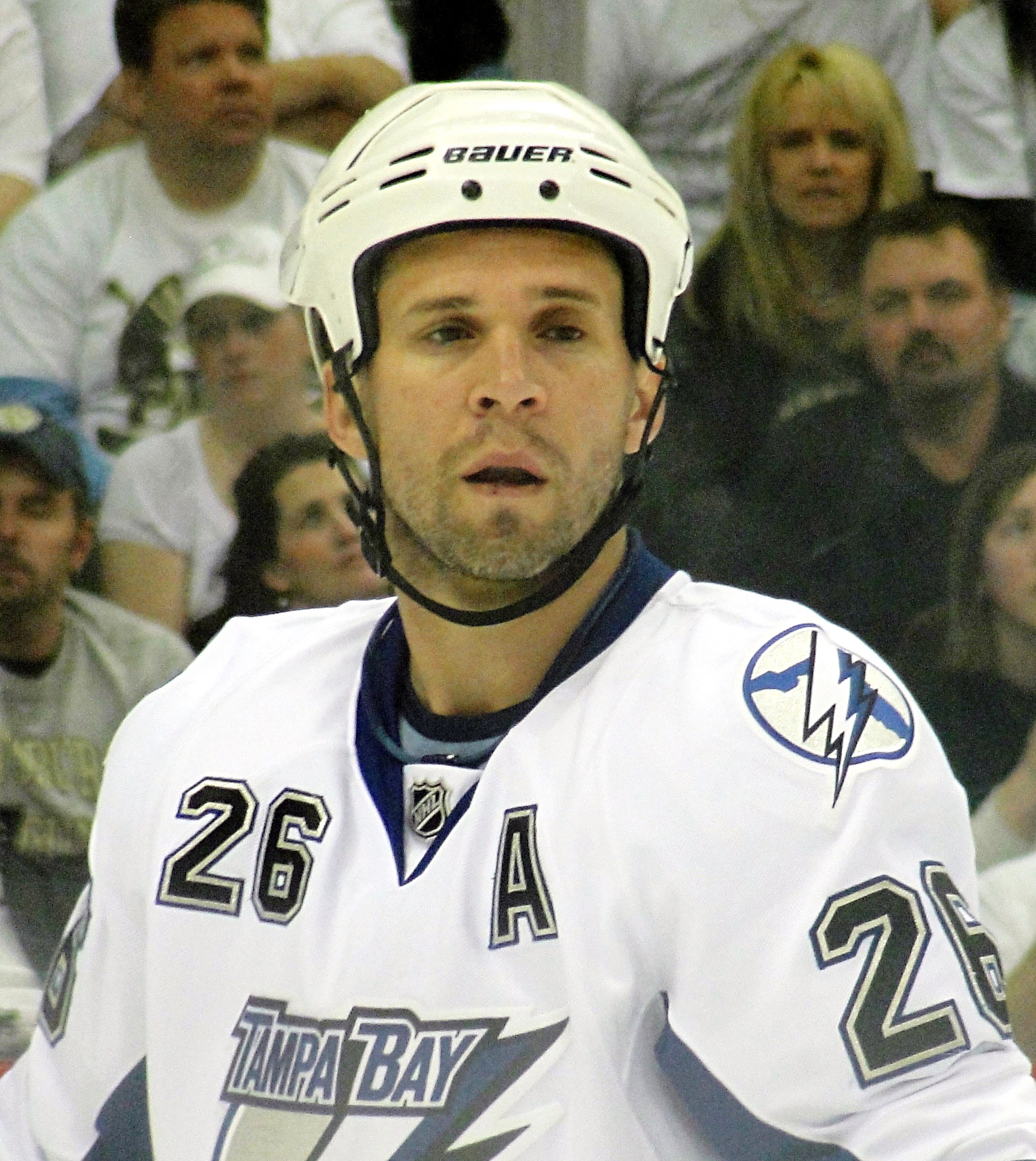
- St. Louis with the Tampa Bay Lightning in 2011
- Born: June 18, 1975 (age 51) Laval, Quebec, Canada
- Height: 5 ft 8 in (173 cm)
- Weight: 180 lb (82 kg; 12 st 12 lb)
- Position: Right wing
- Shot: Left
- Played for: Calgary Flames; Tampa Bay Lightning; Lausanne HC; New York Rangers
- Current NHL coach: Montreal Canadiens
- National team: Canada
- NHL draft: Undrafted
- Playing career: 1997–2015
- Coaching career: 2022–present

Martin St. Louis (French spelling Martin St-Louis, French pronunciation: [maʁtɛ̃ sɛ̃ lwi]; born June 18, 1975) is a Canadian professional ice hockey coach and former player who is the head coach for the Montreal Canadiens of the National Hockey League (NHL). An undrafted player, St. Louis played a total of 1,134 games, scoring 391 goals and 1,033 points in an NHL career that began with the Calgary Flames in 1998 and ended with the New York Rangers in 2015. He is best remembered for having played with the Tampa Bay Lightning and was a member of the Lightning's 2004 Stanley Cup championship team. St. Louis also briefly played with HC Lausanne of the Swiss National League A. He was elected into the Hockey Hall of Fame in 2018, his first year of eligibility. St. Louis is widely considered one of the best undrafted players of all time. On January 17, 2017, St. Louis' number 26 jersey became the first to be retired in Lightning history.

A standout player in college for the Vermont Catamounts, St. Louis earned East Coast Athletic Conference (ECAC) and National Collegiate Athletic Association (NCAA) all-American honors for three consecutive seasons between 1995 and 1997 and was named the ECAC Player of the Year in 1995. As a professional, St. Louis played in six All-Star Games. He was voted the recipient of the Lester B. Pearson Award and Hart Memorial Trophy as the NHL's most valuable player as chosen by the players and league respectively in 2003–04, also winning his first Art Ross Trophy as the NHL's leading scorer with 94 points. St. Louis has on three occasions won the Lady Byng Memorial Trophy as the NHL's most gentlemanly player. In 2013, at age 37, he won his second Art Ross Trophy, becoming the oldest player to ever lead the NHL in scoring. He has also led the NHL in assists in two different seasons (2003–04 and 2012–13).

Internationally, St. Louis has played for Canada on several occasions. He was a member of the team that won the 2004 World Cup of Hockey and is a two-time silver medalist at the World Championships; he was named a tournament all-star after leading the 2009 event in scoring with 15 points. A two-time Olympian, St. Louis was a member of Canada's gold medal-winning team at the 2014 Winter Games.

== Early life ==
St. Louis was born in Laval, Quebec, to Normand and France St. Louis. He has a sister, Isabelle.

As a youth, St. Louis played in the 1988 Quebec International Pee-Wee Hockey Tournament with a minor ice hockey team from Laval, Quebec. He was passed over for a provincial team at a midget age tournament despite leading his league in scoring. He played one season of junior ice hockey with the Hawkesbury Hawks of the Central Junior Hockey League (CJHL) in 1992–93 where he scored 37 goals and 87 points in just 31 games.

== Playing career ==
=== College ===
St. Louis was listed at 5 feet 9 inches (1.75 m) tall in college. He often struggled to gain recognition for his ability, while teams showed little interest in him. He was heavily recruited by National Collegiate Athletic Association (NCAA) schools to play for their programs, however. The University of Vermont Catamounts convinced St. Louis to join their hockey program. He had 51 points in 33 games in his freshman season of 1993–94 and was named to the East Coast Athletic Conference's All-Rookie Team.

In his sophomore season (1994–95), St. Louis was among the top scorers in the NCAA. He had 71 points in 35 games and was named both an ECAC First Team All-Star and NCAA All-American for the first of three consecutive seasons. Additionally, he was named the ECAC Player of the Year. Named team captain for his junior season, St. Louis scored 85 points in 35 games. He tied friend and teammate Éric Perrin for the NCAA scoring lead and the pair, along with goaltender Tim Thomas, led the Catamounts to the first ECAC hockey championship in school history. Named an all-star at the 1996 NCAA Division I Men's Ice Hockey Tournament, St. Louis scored the winning goal in a 2–1 victory over Lake Superior State to reach the Frozen Four. The Catamounts lost the national semi-final to Colorado College, 4–3, in double overtime.

A finalist for the Hobey Baker Award for the first of two consecutive seasons, St. Louis earned interest from National Hockey League (NHL) teams in the summer of 1996. Teams offered signing bonuses of up to $150,000 hoping to convince him to leave Vermont and turn professional. Believing he could attract similar offers the following year, he chose to complete his final year of college eligibility. His offensive numbers slipped in 1996–97 as he scored 59 points in 36 games. St. Louis finished as Vermont's all-time leading scorer with 267 points, a record he continues to hold as of 2023, as well as his school mark of 176 assists. He won the J. Edward Donnelly Award as the top male senior athlete at the University of Vermont in 1997 and was named to the ECAC's all-decade team of the 1990s. The University of Vermont inducted him into its athletics Hall of Fame in 2007, and in 2012 he was presented with the school's Alumni Achievement Award. On January 8, 2016, the University of Vermont retired his jersey number 8 at Gutterson Fieldhouse in front of a sold-out crowd.

=== Calgary Flames (1998–2000) ===
The NHL offers St. Louis anticipated never materialized as teams lost interest in him. Only the Ottawa Senators offered him a tryout prior to the 1997–98 NHL season. When they released him, St. Louis signed a two-year contract with the Cleveland Lumberjacks that included a clause allowing him to leave the team if offered an NHL contract. He had 50 points in 56 games for Cleveland, catching the attention of the Calgary Flames, who signed him to a contract on February 18, 1998. He was assigned to their then-American Hockey League (AHL) affiliate, the Saint John Flames, where he scored 26 points in 25 regular season games. He then added 20 points in 20 playoff games as Saint John reached the Calder Cup finals, losing in six games to the Philadelphia Phantoms.

St. Louis earned a spot on the Calgary roster to begin the 1998–99 season and made his NHL debut on October 9, 1998, against the San Jose Sharks. He scored his first goal on October 20 against Dallas Stars' goaltender Roman Turek. He began the season playing with Calgary's top forward, Theoren Fleury, but was quickly demoted to the fourth line, and often sat out of the lineup. He appeared in only 13 games in Calgary, spending the majority of the season in Saint John where he led the AHL squad with 28 goals and 62 points. He began the 1999–2000 season with Saint John, but earned a recall to Calgary after scoring 26 points in 17 games. St. Louis completed his first full NHL season with 3 goals and 18 points in 56 games. Pleased with his progress, general manager Al Coates picked up St. Louis' contract option for the 2000–01 season. However, the organization fired Coates and his staff that summer and the new management team was not interested in retaining St. Louis. The Flames exposed him in the 2000 NHL Expansion Draft, but after he went unselected, the team bought out his contract and made him an unrestricted free agent.

=== Tampa Bay Lightning (2000–2014) ===
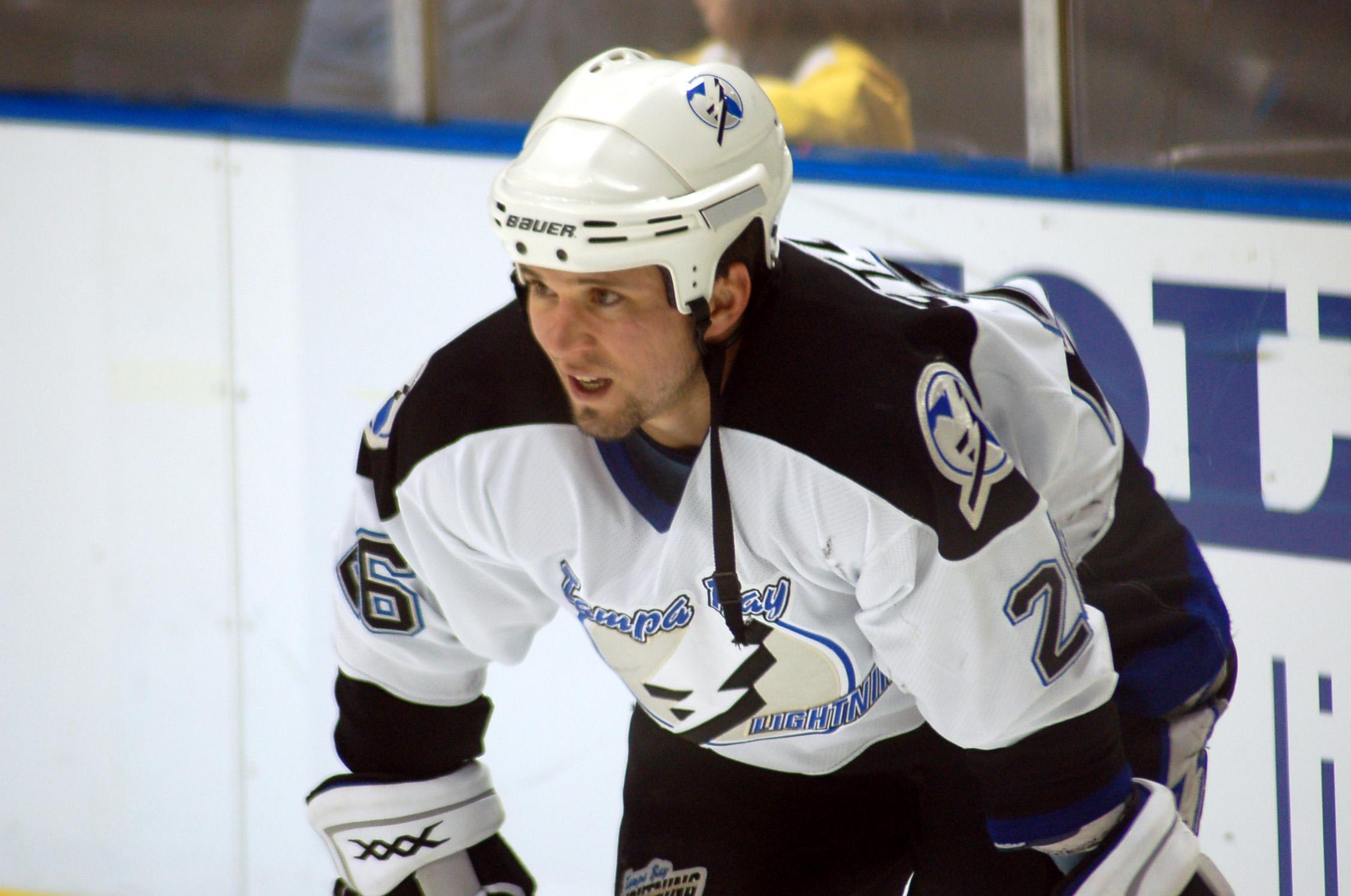
St. Louis with the Tampa Bay Lightning in January 2006

A few teams expressed interest in St. Louis. He chose to sign with the Tampa Bay Lightning as he believed they were the most likely to give him playing time in the NHL. He made his debut with the team on October 6, 2000. He struggled at first, failing to score a goal in the first six weeks of the season and again found himself out of the lineup at times. Realizing that he was at a career crossroads, St. Louis abandoned the changes to his game that his NHL coaches had impressed on him, trusting his own instincts. He scored his first goal of the season on November 22, 2000, and finished the season playing in 78 games with 18 goals, 22 assists and 40 points – 34 of which came after December 1.

While leading the team with 16 goals midway through the 2001–02 season, St. Louis suffered a broken leg following an awkward check by Josef Melichar of the Pittsburgh Penguins on January 23, 2002. Consequently, he appeared in only 53 of Tampa Bay's 82 games, finishing with 35 points. He had a breakout season in 2002–03, finishing fourth in team scoring with 70 points and tying Vincent Lecavalier for the team lead with 33 goals along with 37 assists. He led the team in plus-minus at +10 and appeared in his first NHL All-Star Game. St. Louis won the puck control relay event and finished second in the fastest skater events of the 2003 All-Star Game's skills competition. He scored his first career hat-trick on January 30, 2003, in a game against the Carolina Hurricanes. In the 2003 playoffs, Tampa Bay won its first playoff series in franchise history when they eliminated the Washington Capitals. Three of St. Louis' seven goals were game-winners, including the overtime goal in the sixth game that won the series against the sixth-seeded Capitals before falling in five games in the second round to the second-seeded New Jersey Devils. He led the team with 12 points (seven goals, five assists) in all 11 playoff games.

St. Louis exceeded his previous season in 2003–04, capturing the Art Ross Trophy as the NHL's leading scorer with 94 points (38 goals, 56 assists). His plus-minus of +38 led the league. He scored his 100th career goal on February 17, 2004, against the Philadelphia Flyers. He led the 2004 playoffs with 15 assists and finished with 24 playoff points in 23 games. He led the Lightning to the Stanley Cup Final against St. Louis' former team, the Calgary Flames, against whom he scored the overtime winning goal on Miikka Kiprusoff in game six to force a deciding seventh game of the series. The Lightning won the game 2–1 to secure the franchise's first Stanley Cup. St. Louis won several postseason awards: He was named a first team All-Star and voted recipient of the Lester B. Pearson Award as the NHL's most valuable player as selected by the players. He also won the Hart Memorial Trophy as the NHL's most valuable player. St. Louis was only the eighth player in NHL history to win the Art Ross and Hart Trophies and the Stanley Cup in the same season, and the first to do so since Wayne Gretzky in 1986–87.

While the 2004–05 NHL season was ultimately cancelled by a labour dispute, St. Louis spent it playing in Europe. He signed a contract with HC Lausanne of Switzerland's National League A. He scored 25 points in 23 games. When the NHL resumed in 2005–06, St. Louis signed a six-year contract extension with the Lightning worth US$31.5 million. He finished with his third 30-goal season, but scored only 61 points on the campaign.

The 2006–07 season was St. Louis' greatest offensive year as he topped the 100-point plateau for the first time. He finished with career highs in goals, (43), and points, (102). He played in his 500th career game on February 9, 2007, against the New York Rangers and after becoming the first Lightning player to appear in three All-Star Games, became the first to score a goal in the mid-season event. He was named to the second All-Star team following the season. An injury to Tim Taylor resulted in St. Louis being named an alternate captain in 2007–08. St. Louis made his fourth All-Star Game appearance in 2007–08 amidst an 83-point campaign. He scored his 500th career point with a goal against the Buffalo Sabres on March 19, 2008. Leading the Lightning with 30 goals, 50 assists and 80 points in 2008–09, St. Louis earned his fifth All-Star appearance.

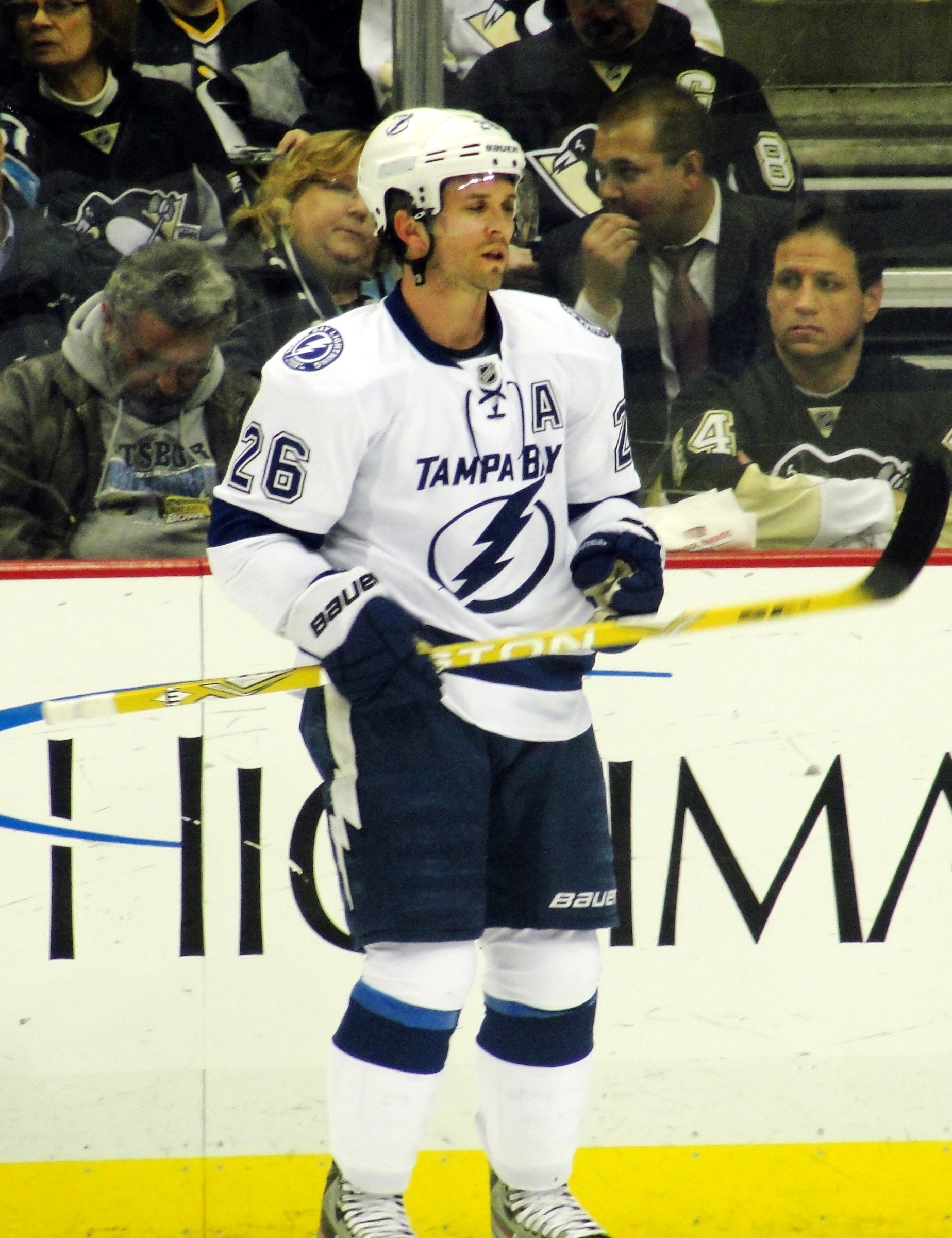
St. Louis with the Tampa Bay Lightning in February 2012

St. Louis finished fifth in the league with 94 points in 2009–10. He had two 11-game point streaks during the season, the longest in franchise history, and was named to the second All-Star team. Finishing with only 12 penalty minutes on the season, he was voted the recipient of the Lady Byng Memorial Trophy as the NHL player displaying the best combination of skill and sportsmanship. It was the fifth time he had been named a finalist for the award.

He won the Lady Byng Trophy for a second time in 2010–11, the culmination of a season in which St. Louis made his sixth All-Star Game appearance, was named to the second All-Star team for the third time and finished second in league scoring with 99 points (31 goals, 68 assists) only behind Daniel Sedin of the Vancouver Canucks, who finished with 104 points. He was a finalist for the Hart Memorial Trophy for the second time, losing out to Anaheim Ducks forward Corey Perry.

The 2011–12 season was the first under a four-year contract extension signed during the previous campaign. Lightning general manager Steve Yzerman praised St. Louis' importance to the organization when announcing the signing: "Marty means so much to this franchise, both on and off the ice. His hard work and dedication are unsurpassed and we are thrilled that he will finish his career here in Tampa Bay." A durable player, St. Louis held the NHL's third longest "ironman" streak among active players, having played every game since 2005. The streak came to an end at 499 consecutive games played in early December 2011 when he was struck in the face by a shot from teammate Dominic Moore during practice. Despite suffering facial and sinus fractures, he missed only five games due to the injury. The 36-year-old St. Louis finished the season with 74 points (25 goals, 49 assists) in 77 games.

In the lockout-shortened 2012–13 season, St. Louis led the NHL with 43 assists, and his 60 points were enough to capture his second Art Ross Trophy as the NHL's leading scorer. After the season, he was named a second team All-Star. With only 14 penalty minutes on the season, St. Louis also won his third Lady Byng Trophy.

The Lightning named St. Louis the ninth captain in franchise history prior to the 2013–14 season. He replaced Vincent Lecavalier, who departed Tampa in the off-season. St. Louis played his 1,000th NHL game on November 19, 2013, against the Los Angeles Kings. He is the 286th player in NHL history to reach the milestone, but only the 16th undrafted player to do so since the creation of the universal NHL entry draft in 1969. In his 1,000th game, he recorded an assist on a goal scored by Valtteri Filppula. St. Louis set a career high and tied a Lightning franchise record by scoring four goals in a January 18, 2014, game against the San Jose Sharks. His 600th career assist came two weeks later on a goal scored by Victor Hedman in a 5–3 loss to the Ottawa Senators on January 30.

=== New York Rangers (2014–2015) ===
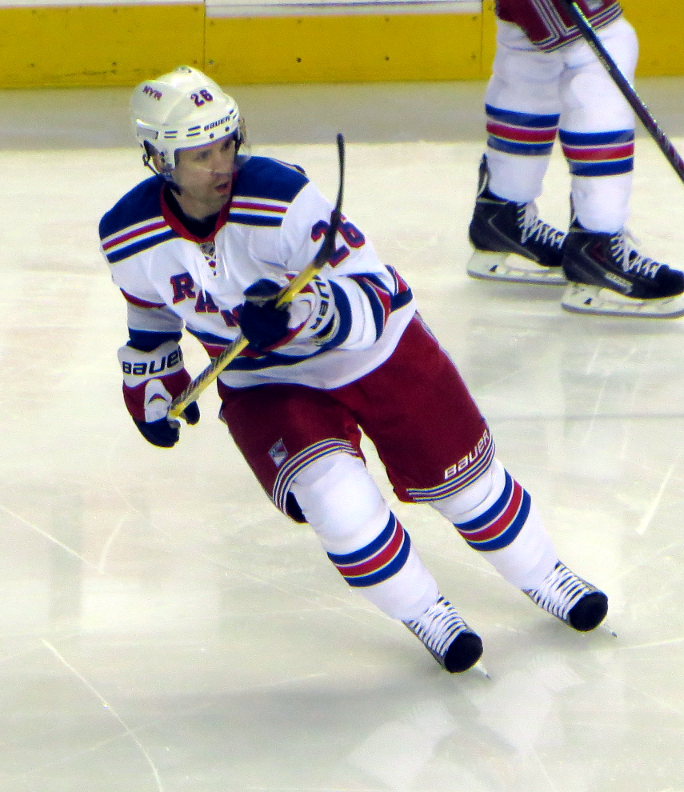
St. Louis as a member of the Rangers in 2014

In January 2014, then-Lightning general manager Steve Yzerman, who also served as the general manager for Canada's team at the 2014 Winter Olympics, elected not to include St. Louis on Canada's roster. St. Louis was ultimately named to the team as an injury replacement after Steven Stamkos was not medically cleared to play. At the same time, St. Louis requested a trade from Tampa Bay. The no movement clause in his contract gave St. Louis control over where he could be moved and he reportedly consented to only being traded to the New York Rangers, a request he first made in 2009. The Lightning honoured his request, and St. Louis was sent to New York along with a conditional 2015 second-round pick on March 5, 2014, in exchange for Ryan Callahan, a 2015 first-round draft pick, a conditional 2014 second-round pick (which became a first-round pick) and a conditional 2015 seventh-round pick. Both of the first-round draft picks acquired by the Lightning in this trade were eventually traded to the New York Islanders. Though reluctant to speak of his reasons for requesting the trade, he eventually admitted the initial Olympic snub was the primary cause. He felt a lack of respect when Yzerman initially left him off the Canadian team. St. Louis also expressed his regret over the damage the events caused to his relationship with the fans in Tampa.

St. Louis struggled offensively in his first games with the Rangers as he went 14 games without scoring a goal. He scored only one in 19 regular season games – finishing the season with 30 combined between Tampa Bay and New York – and added seven assists to finish with 69 points on the season. The death of his mother, France, of a heart attack on May 8 left St. Louis' participation in games five and six of New York's second-round playoff series against the Pittsburgh Penguins in doubt. He chose to play after speaking with his father. The Rangers players rallied around St. Louis as he became the team's focus. He led the Rangers as they overcame a 3–1 series deficit against Pittsburgh to win the series in seven games en route to reaching the 2014 Stanley Cup Final. St. Louis led the team with eight goals in the playoffs and finished second with 15 points, but the Rangers lost the final to the Los Angeles Kings in five games.

St. Louis returned to the Rangers for what would be his last NHL season in 2014–15, and was named an alternate captain underneath newly appointed captain Ryan McDonagh.

St. Louis made his first return to Tampa Bay on November 26, and was welcomed with a video tribute and standing ovation from the fans prior to the start of the game, which Tampa won 5–4. Two days later, St. Louis recorded a goal and an assist against the Philadelphia Flyers to reach 1,000 points in his career, becoming the sixth undrafted player in NHL history to do so. St. Louis would face the Lightning again in the 2015 Eastern Conference Final, in a series Tampa Bay won in seven games. St. Louis finished the 2015 playoff campaign with 1 goal and 6 assists in 19 playoff games.

The Rangers did not offer St. Louis a new contract during the off-season, despite his desire to return to the team. Despite receiving other offers in free agency, St. Louis formally announced his retirement from professional hockey on July 2, 2015.

== International play ==
Medal record

Representing Canada

Men's ice hockey

Olympic Games
Gold medal – first place	2014 Sochi	

World Championships
Silver medal – second place	2008 Canada	
Silver medal – second place	2009 Switzerland	

Following his MVP season in the NHL, St. Louis joined Team Canada for the first time, appearing at the 2004 World Cup of Hockey. With a goal and an assist, he led Canada to an opening game, 2–1 victory over the United States. Overall, he scored four points in six games as Canada won the World Cup. The majority of that team returned for the 2006 Winter Olympic tournament, and St. Louis played in his first Olympic Games. The team struggled offensively throughout the tournament, finishing in seventh place. St. Louis scored two goals and added an assist in six games.

St. Louis has twice played in the World Championships. He first played in the 2008 tournament, held in Canada. He appeared in all nine games for Team Canada, scoring ten points. Canada reached the final, but were forced to settle for the silver medal after a 5–4 overtime loss to Russia. Returning for the 2009 World Championship in Switzerland, St. Louis led the tournament in scoring with 15 points. Canada met Russia in a rematch of the 2008 final, however St. Louis and his teammates were again relegated to the silver medal, dropping a 2–1 decision. St. Louis was named to the tournament's all-star team at forward. He was selected as a reserve by Team Canada for the 2010 Winter Olympics. On February 6, 2014, he was selected to replace injured former Lightning teammate Steven Stamkos for representation at the 2014 Winter Olympics and played in five of Canada's six games. St. Louis won an Olympic gold medal with Canada in a 3–0 victory over Sweden in the gold medal game.

== Coaching career ==
In 2017, St. Louis was offered the position of head coach of the Hartford Wolf Pack, the AHL affiliate of the New York Rangers, by Rangers general manager Jeff Gorton. He declined, citing a desire to focus on his sons' youth hockey teams.

Interest in St. Louis's services on a professional level persisted. On January 21, 2019, he became the special teams consultant for the Columbus Blue Jackets, working alongside John Tortorella, his former Tampa Bay Lightning head coach.

=== Montreal Canadiens (2022–present) ===
On February 9, 2022, St. Louis was named as interim head coach of the Montreal Canadiens, following the firing of Dominique Ducharme. The Canadiens' new general manager, Kent Hughes, had first become acquainted with St. Louis while the latter was playing for the University of Vermont, while Gorton, who had previously offered St. Louis a coaching role in the AHL, was now the Canadiens' executive vice president. They recruited him to assist the team in the midst of a historically poor 8–30–7 start to the 2021–22 season. St. Louis' lack of professional coaching experience attracted media comment, to which he said, "I'm not coming in as a substitute teacher. I'm coming here to show my work and we'll see what happens this summer, but my intention is to stay here for a long time. But I'll need to show and prove it." Arriving when team morale was low, St. Louis was credited with boosting competitiveness through narrow losses in his first three games before recording his first NHL win as a coach on February 17 in a 3–2 victory over the St. Louis Blues. In his first visit to Tampa Bay as a coach, the Canadiens won their first game at Amalie Arena since 2017. He finished his first half-season as a coach with a 14–19–4 record. St. Louis was widely credited with huge improvement in the performance of Cole Caufield, a rookie often compared to St. Louis himself as a shorter than average forward. After the end of the season, St. Louis was named permanent head coach of the Canadiens on June 1, 2022, signing a three-year extension with the team.

On April 17, 2024, the Canadiens exercised a two-year option on St. Louis' contract, extending it through the conclusion of the 2026–27 season. After three years at or near the bottom of the league standings, St. Louis and Canadiens management approached the 2024–25 season with the goal of being "in the mix" for the 2025 Stanley Cup playoffs until late March or April. The season began poorly, with St. Louis taking criticism in some quarters for the perceived difficulty of the team's defensive scheme, which prompted him to make alterations. The team's performance gradually improved thereafter. St. Louis registered his 100th career coaching win on February 4, 2025. Following the league's midseason hiatus for the 4 Nations Face-Off, the Canadiens went on 15–5–6 run through the end of the season, clinching the final playoff berth in the Eastern Conference in their final regular season game. St. Louis was widely credited as a key figure in the team reaching the playoffs for the first time in four years. In recognition of his work, he was named a finalist for the Jack Adams Award, given annually to the NHL's best coach.

In the 2025–26 season, St. Louis' Canadiens would finish sixth in the league, and third in the Atlantic Division. The Canadiens defeated the Lightning in the first round of the 2026 Stanley Cup playoffs, giving him his first playoff series win as a coach. In the second round, St. Louis led the Canadiens to a series win over the Atlantic Division's top-seeded Buffalo Sabres, and Montreal then played in the Eastern Conference finals against the Carolina Hurricanes where they lost in five games. St. Louis was fifth in balloting for the Jack Adams Award that year.

Shortly before the beginning of the 2026–27 season, St. Louis signed a new four-year contract with the Canadiens.

== Playing style ==
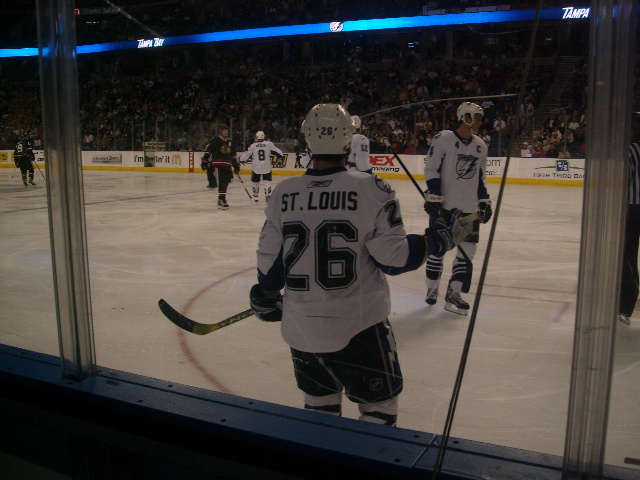
St. Louis skates against the Blackhawks in February 2009. He wears number 26 in tribute to his childhood hero, diminutive former Montreal Canadiens star Mats Näslund.

Listed at five-foot-eight inches tall during his playing days, St. Louis found himself to be one of the smallest players in the NHL. Hockey Hall of Fame coach Scotty Bowman credited St. Louis' desire to succeed as being his primary attribute: "His long suit is his passion. Small players have to have some special attribute that makes them stand out. He's got great acceleration and hockey sense." St. Louis was also a durable player throughout his career, missing only seven games between 2002 and 2012.

An offensive minded player throughout his amateur and minor professional career, St. Louis was forced into a checking-line role by the Calgary Flames. He credits the experience for rounding out his game: "I played a true third-line role, killing penalties and playing against the other team's top lines. For me, it was like a five-month crash course on developing my defensive game. My whole life, I had been an offensive player, and suddenly I was in the role of trying to be smart without the puck. I think those fifty-six games helped me develop into a complete player."

== Personal life ==
St. Louis met his wife Heather Anne Caragol at the University of Vermont, where he graduated in 1997 with a degree in small business management. They have three sons. The family maintains an off-season home in Heather's native Greenwich, Connecticut.

St. Louis runs an annual summer hockey camp in the nearby community of Stamford for young players in the region.

On January 8, 2016, the Vermont Catamounts held Martin St. Louis Night, which resulted in a 1–0 victory over visiting Dartmouth. During the night, St. Louis' number 8 was retired by the program during a pre-game ceremony. This was the first time in program history that the team retired the jersey of a former player. Additionally, senior Jonathan Turk handed St. Louis his number 8 jersey prior to the game. Turk wore the number 88 for the rest of the season.

On October 6, 2016, the Lightning announced that they would retire St. Louis' number 26. St. Louis became the first player in the history of the Lightning organization to have his jersey retired. The ceremony occurred on January 13, 2017, when the Lightning hosted the Columbus Blue Jackets at Amalie Arena.

On March 17, 2023, St. Louis was inducted into the Tampa Bay Lightning Hall of Fame, as a member of its inaugural class.

== Career statistics ==
=== Regular season and playoffs ===
Bold indicates led league

			Regular season					Playoffs
Season	Team	League	GP	G	A	Pts	PIM	GP	G	A	Pts	PIM
1992–93	Hawkesbury Hawks	CJHL	31	37	50	87	70	—	—	—	—	—
1993–94	Vermont Catamounts	ECAC	33	15	36	51	24	—	—	—	—	—
1994–95	Vermont Catamounts	ECAC	35	23	48	71	36	—	—	—	—	—
1995–96	Vermont Catamounts	ECAC	35	29	56	85	38	—	—	—	—	—
1996–97	Vermont Catamounts	ECAC	36	24	36	60	65	—	—	—	—	—
1997–98	Cleveland Lumberjacks	IHL	56	16	34	50	24	—	—	—	—	—
1997–98	Saint John Flames	AHL	25	15	11	26	20	20	5	15	20	16
1998–99	Calgary Flames	NHL	13	1	1	2	10	—	—	—	—	—
1998–99	Saint John Flames	AHL	53	28	34	62	30	7	4	4	8	2
1999–00	Saint John Flames	AHL	17	15	11	26	14	—	—	—	—	—
1999–00	Calgary Flames	NHL	56	3	15	18	22	—	—	—	—	—
2000–01	Tampa Bay Lightning	NHL	78	18	22	40	12	—	—	—	—	—
2001–02	Tampa Bay Lightning	NHL	53	16	19	35	20	—	—	—	—	—
2002–03	Tampa Bay Lightning	NHL	82	33	37	70	32	11	7	5	12	0
2003–04	Tampa Bay Lightning	NHL	82	38	**56**	**94**	24	23	9	15	24	14
2004–05	HC Lausanne	NLA	23	9	16	25	16	—	—	—	—	—
2005–06	Tampa Bay Lightning	NHL	80	31	30	61	38	5	4	0	4	2
2006–07	Tampa Bay Lightning	NHL	82	43	59	102	28	6	3	5	8	8
2007–08	Tampa Bay Lightning	NHL	82	25	58	83	26	—	—	—	—	—
2008–09	Tampa Bay Lightning	NHL	82	30	50	80	14	—	—	—	—	—
2009–10	Tampa Bay Lightning	NHL	82	29	65	94	12	—	—	—	—	—
2010–11	Tampa Bay Lightning	NHL	82	31	68	99	12	18	10	10	20	4
2011–12	Tampa Bay Lightning	NHL	77	25	49	74	16	—	—	—	—	—
2012–13	Tampa Bay Lightning	NHL	48	17	**43**	**60**	14	—	—	—	—	—
2013–14	Tampa Bay Lightning	NHL	62	29	32	61	6	—	—	—	—	—
2013–14	New York Rangers	NHL	19	1	7	8	4	25	8	7	15	2
2014–15	New York Rangers	NHL	74	21	31	52	20	19	1	6	7	4
NHL totals			1,134	391	642	1,033	310	107	42	48	90	34

=== International ===
Year	Team	Event	Result	GP	G	A	Pts	PIM
2004	Canada	WCH	1st place, gold medalist(s)	6	2	2	4	0
2006	Canada	OG	7th	6	2	1	3	0
2008	Canada	WC	2nd place, silver medalist(s)	9	2	8	10	0
2009	Canada	WC	2nd place, silver medalist(s)	9	4	11	15	0
2014	Canada	OG	1st place, gold medalist(s)	5	0	0	0	2
Senior totals				35	10	22	32	2

== Head coaching record ==
Team	Year	Regular season						Postseason			
Team	Year	G	W	L	OTL	Pts	Finish	W	L	Win %	Result
MTL	2021–22	37	14	19	4	(32)	8th in Atlantic	—	—	—	Missed playoffs
MTL	2022–23	82	31	45	6	68	8th in Atlantic	—	—	—	Missed playoffs
MTL	2023–24	82	30	36	16	76	8th in Atlantic	—	—	—	Missed playoffs
MTL	2024–25	82	40	31	11	91	5th in Atlantic	1	4	.200	Lost in first round (WSH)
MTL	2025–26	82	48	24	10	106	3rd in Atlantic	9	10	.474	Lost in conference finals (CAR)
Total		365	163	155	47			10	14	.417	2 playoff appearances

== Awards and honours ==
Award	Year	Ref
College
All-ECAC Hockey Rookie Team	1994	
All-ECAC Hockey First Team	1995, 1996, 1997	
AHCA East First-Team All-American	1995, 1996, 1997	
ECAC Player of the Year	1995	
ECAC Hockey All-Tournament Team	1996	
All-NCAA All-Tournament Team	1996	
NHL
All-Star Game	2003, 2004, 2007, 2008, 2009, 2011	
Plus-Minus Award (shared with Marek Malík)	2004	
NHL first All-Star team	2004	
Art Ross Trophy	2004, 2013	
Lester B. Pearson Award	2004	
Hart Memorial Trophy	2004	
Stanley Cup champion	2004	
NHL 2K cover athlete	2005	
NHL second All-Star team	2007, 2010, 2011, 2013	
Lady Byng Memorial Trophy	2010, 2011, 2013	
Hockey Hall of Fame	2018	
International
World Cup of Hockey champion	2004	
World Championship All-Star forward	2009	

Awards and achievements
Preceded by Steve Martins	ECAC Hockey Player of the Year; 1994–95	Succeeded by Éric Perrin
Preceded by Brendan Morrison	NCAA Ice Hockey Scoring Champion; 1995–96; With: Éric Perrin	Succeeded by Brendan Morrison
Preceded by Peter Forsberg	Winner of the Hart Memorial Trophy; 2004	Succeeded by Joe Thornton
Preceded by Peter Forsberg; Evgeni Malkin	Winner of the Art Ross Trophy; 2004; 2013	Succeeded by Joe Thornton; Sidney Crosby
Preceded by Markus Näslund	Winner of the Lester B. Pearson Award; 2004	Succeeded by Jaromír Jágr
Preceded by Peter Forsberg and Milan Hejduk	Co-winner of the NHL Plus/Minus Award; 2004; With: Marek Malík	Succeeded by Wade Redden and Michal Rozsíval
Preceded by Pavel Datsyuk; Brian Campbell	Winner of the Lady Byng Memorial Trophy; 2010, 2011; 2013	Succeeded by Brian Campbell; Ryan O'Reilly
Sporting positions
Preceded by Vincent Lecavalier	Tampa Bay Lightning captain 2013–14	Succeeded by Steven Stamkos
Preceded by Dominque Ducharme	Head coach of the Montreal Canadiens; 2022–present	Incumbent
