= Pavel Datsyuk =

Russian ice hockey player (born 1978)

- Hockey Hall of Fame, 2024
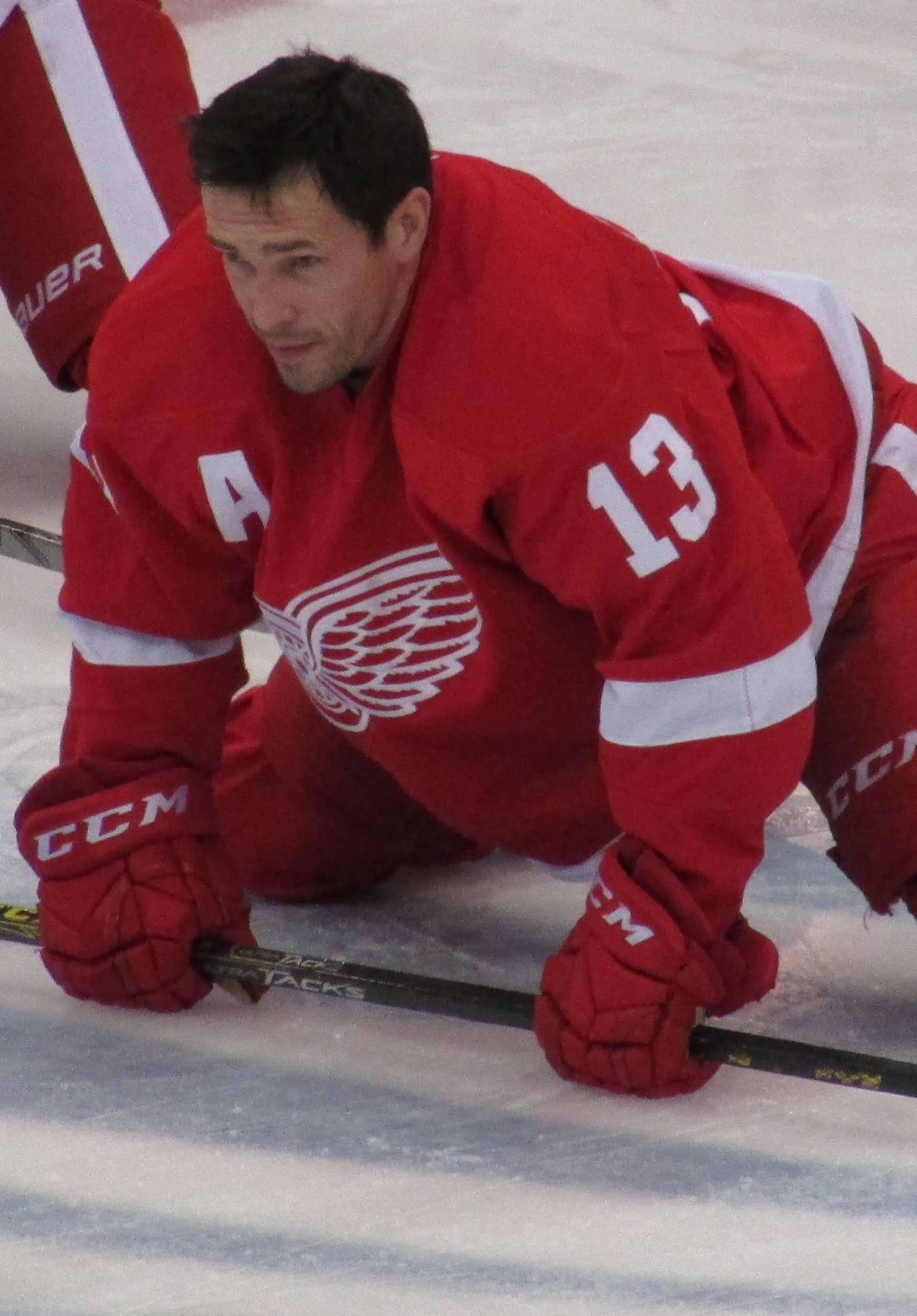
- Datsyuk with the Detroit Red Wings in 2015
- Born: 20 July 1978 (age 48) Sverdlovsk, Russian SFSR, Soviet Union
- Height: 5 ft 11 in (180 cm)
- Weight: 198 lb (90 kg; 14 st 2 lb)
- Position: Centre
- Shot: Left
- Played for: Spartak Yekaterinburg; Ak Bars Kazan; Detroit Red Wings; Dynamo Moscow; CSKA Moscow; SKA Saint Petersburg; Avtomobilist Yekaterinburg
- National team: Russia
- NHL draft: 171st overall, 1998; Detroit Red Wings
- Playing career: 1996–2021

Pavel Valeryevich Datsyuk (Russian: Па́вел Вале́рьевич Дацю́к, IPA: [ˈpavʲɪl dɐˈtsuk]; born 20 July 1978) is a Russian former professional ice hockey player, who played for the Detroit Red Wings of the National Hockey League (NHL) from 2001 to 2016. Nicknamed the "Magic Man", Datsyuk was named one of the "100 Greatest NHL Players" in history, and was the only active player on the list outside the NHL at the time of announcement.

Datsyuk won the Stanley Cup in 2002 and 2008 with the Red Wings, and the Gagarin Cup in 2017 with SKA Saint Petersburg. He was part of the Russia men's national ice hockey team at the Olympic Games in 2002, 2006, 2010 and was team captain in 2014 and 2018. With his gold medal win at the 2018 Olympics, Datsyuk joined the Triple Gold Club.

Datsyuk was well known for his elite defensive play and game-changing offensive skills. He won the Frank J. Selke Trophy as the NHL's top defensive forward in 2008, 2009 and 2010 while also being a finalist for the award in 2011, 2012 and 2013. He also won four consecutive Lady Byng Memorial Trophies, from 2006 to 2009, awarded for performance and sportsmanship while also being a finalist for the award in 2015. He was nominated for the Hart Memorial Trophy as the NHL's most valuable player in 2009. He was also a leading player for the Russian hockey team at multiple Olympics and World Cups. Datsyuk was inducted into the Hockey Hall of Fame in 2024.

== Early years ==
Datsyuk was born in Sverdlovsk, Russian SFSR, in the Soviet Union. His parents have called him by his diminutive (nickname) "Pasha" from an early age. His childhood had more than its fair share of difficulties, especially at the age of 15, when his mother died.

While Datsyuk displayed above-average hockey skills, he was often overlooked by scouts because of his smaller size. He began playing for the farm club of Dynamo Yekaterinburg in the mid-1990s, though he seemed headed for an undistinguished career until noted Olympic trainer Vladimir Krikunov began coaching the team.

The boy "with the twitchy walk" caught the eye of Krikunov, but not on the ice. Instead, Datsyuk excelled on the soccer field, where his anticipation, vision, and intelligence were more apparent. Under Krikunov, Datsyuk evolved into a particularly efficient two-way player, and he began to draw wider attention among Russian hockey fans. Despite his early successes, however, he went undrafted in the 1996 and 1997 NHL drafts.

== Playing career ==
=== Early play in Russia ===
Datsyuk was first noticed by Detroit Red Wings Director of European Scouting Håkan Andersson in the summer of 1997–98. Andersson was in Moscow to scout defenceman Dmitri Kalinin, but the one who caught his eye was Datsyuk, described as "this little guy on the other team." Andersson made another trip to see Datsyuk and would have gone a third time, though his flight was canceled due to a storm. A scout from the Calgary Flames was scheduled to fly on the plane as well, and as a result of the storm Andersson believes he was the only NHL scout to have seen Datsyuk play prior to the 1998 NHL entry draft, when the Red Wings drafted him 171st overall. Despite being selected in the 1998 NHL Entry Draft, Datsyuk continued to play for Dynamo Yekaterinburg through 2000, when he then played for Ak Bars Kazan during the 2000–01 season. During the 2000–01 season for AK Bars Kazan, he recorded 42 games played, nine goals, and 17 assists.

=== Detroit Red Wings (2001–2016) ===
==== 2001–2006: Early years, first Stanley Cup title ====
When Datsyuk began his NHL career for the Red Wings, he was mentored by compatriot stars Igor Larionov and Sergei Fedorov, as well as Detroit captain Steve Yzerman. He was put on a line with Brett Hull and Boyd Devereaux and had a moderately productive first year. The length and difficulty of the NHL season forced him to sit out a number of games at the end of the year in preparation for the 2002 playoffs. After the Red Wings won the Presidents' Trophy as the regular season champions, Datsyuk contributed three goals and three assists to the Red Wings' 2002 Stanley Cup run.

Expectations were high for Datsyuk's second season, particularly with the addition of another highly touted prospect to the team, Henrik Zetterberg. Zetterberg replaced Boyd Devereaux on the Datsyuk–Hull line, and the famous version of the "Two Kids and an Old Goat Line" was born. He played only 64 games due to a knee injury but ended up with 51 points for the season. His playoff performance was disappointing, however, the same as the entire Red Wings team; Detroit was swept by the Mighty Ducks of Anaheim in the first round of the 2003 playoffs, and Datsyuk was held pointless within the four games played.

The departure of Sergei Fedorov in the 2003 off-season made room for Datsyuk to rise to prominence on the Red Wings. He took full advantage of his elevated ice time, where his playmaking skills earned him a spot in the 2004 NHL All-Star Game. Datsyuk finished the 2003–04 season with 30 goals and 38 assists for 68 points in 75 games as the Red Wings won the Presidents' Trophy. In the 2004 playoffs, he had no goals and six assists through 12 games before Detroit was eliminated in the second round by the Calgary Flames.

Datsyuk became a restricted free agent during the 2004–05 off-season but could not reach a deal with the Red Wings despite repeated statements by his agent, Gary Greenstin, indicating his desire to stay in Detroit. He chose not to take the salary dispute to arbitration, and instead played with Dynamo Moscow during the 2004–05 NHL lockout. On 4 September 2005, Datsyuk then signed a one-year contract with Avangard Omsk of the Russian Superleague (RSL), where Dynamo Moscow matched the offer two days later, retaining the player.

On 19 September 2005, the day the arbitration committee of the RSL was set to determine which club had Datsyuk's rights, Datsyuk agreed to a two-year deal with the Red Wings for a total of US$7.8 million. During the 2005–06 season, which saw the Red Wings win another presidents' Trophy, Datsyuk's high level of play, combined with his sportsmanship (just 22 penalty minutes for the entire season), won him the Lady Byng Trophy, the first of four consecutive awards. Datsyuk also earned a spot on the Russian national team for the 2006 Winter Olympics in Turin, Italy.

==== 2006–2013: Ascent to stardom, Selke trophies, second Stanley Cup championship ====
During the 2006–07 season, Datsyuk debuted Reebok's new hockey stick, with holes bored into the shaft to make it more aerodynamic, dubbed the 9KO. He completed the season matching his previous campaign's total of 87 points. Prior to the beginning of the 2007 playoffs, on 6 April 2007, Datsyuk signed a seven-year, US$46.9 million contract extension with the Red Wings. He then helped Detroit to another lengthy playoff run as they advanced to the Western Conference Finals against the second-seeded eventual Stanley Cup champion Anaheim Ducks, who defeated the Red Wings in six games. He contributed 16 points (eight goals and assists) in all 18 games during the run.

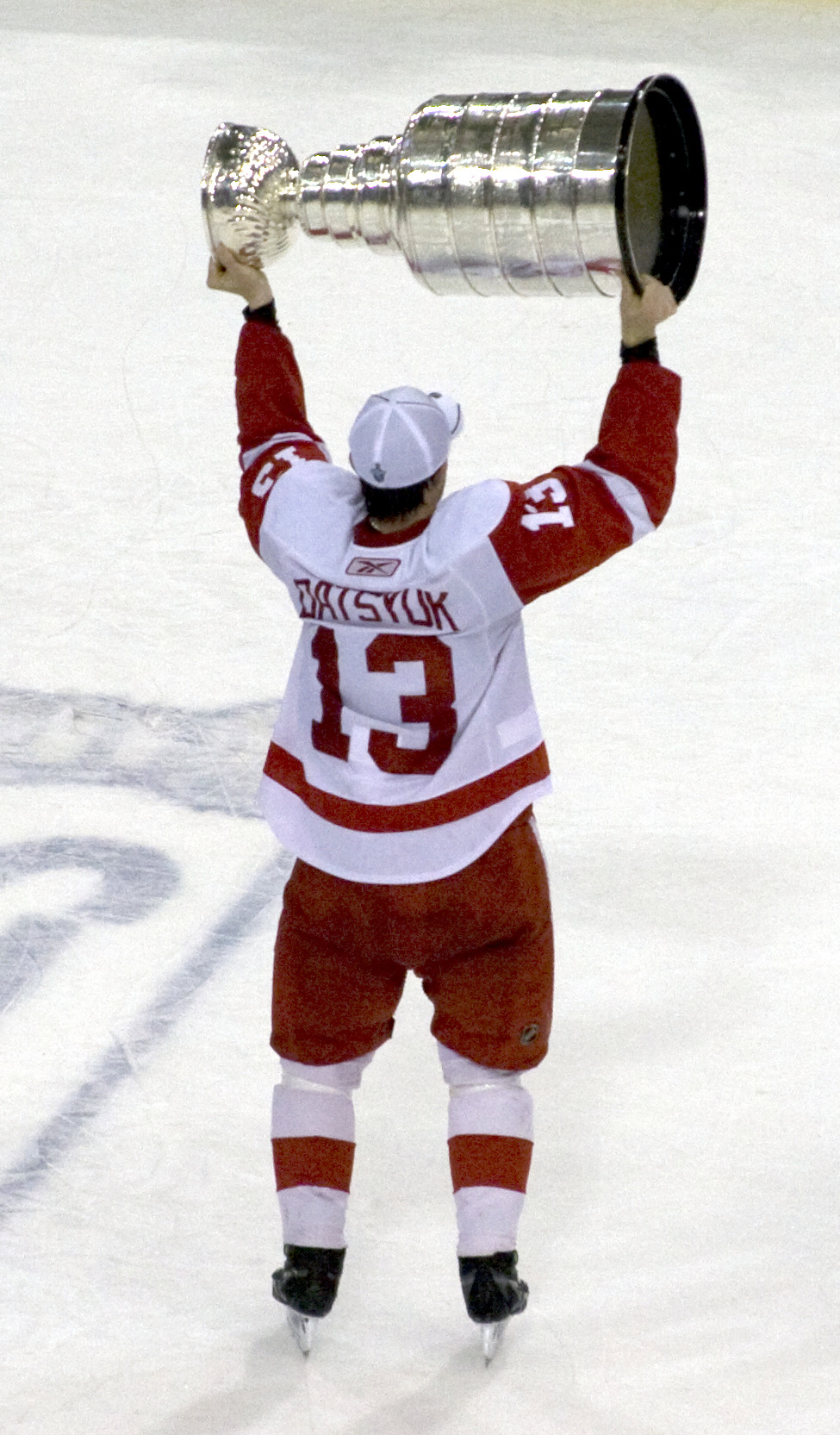
Datsyuk hoisting the Stanley Cup in June 2008

In 2007–08, Datsyuk was voted by NHL fans, along with teammates Nicklas Lidström and Henrik Zetterberg, to start for the Western Conference in the 2008 All-Star Game at Philips Arena in Atlanta on January 27, 2008. He went on to have a career year, scoring a team-high 97 points (31 goals, 66 assists) in all 82 games while also leading all Red Wings forwards in blocked shots. In leading the team in scoring, he joined Ted Lindsay, Gordie Howe and Steve Yzerman as the only players in franchise history to do so in three consecutive seasons. The Red Wings would also go on to win the Presidents' Trophy as the regular season champions. Entering into the 2008 playoffs, Datsyuk scored his first career NHL hat-trick on 12 May, in a 5–2 win over the Dallas Stars in game three of the Western Conference Finals, en route to a meeting in the Final with the Pittsburgh Penguins. In game six of the series, Datsyuk recorded two assists on goals by Henrik Zetterberg and Brian Rafalski in a 3–2 win to win the series in six games and clinch the team's 11th Stanley Cup title and its fourth title in 11 years and second for Datsyuk himself. Having led the NHL in 2007–08 with a plus-minus of +41 and 144 takeaways (58 more than Mike Modano's second-best total of 86), Datsyuk was awarded the Frank J. Selke Trophy as the League' best defensive forward. With just 20 penalty minutes, he also won the Lady Byng Trophy. In voting for the Selke, Datsyuk received 537 points (43 first place votes) while John Madden of the New Jersey Devils received 447 points and Datsyuk's linemate Henrik Zetterberg received 425 points. In voting for the Lady Byng, Datsyuk received 985 points (75 first place votes). In addition, Datsyuk became the first NHL player to win the Lady Byng three consecutive times in over 70 years, since Frank Boucher of the New York Rangers won from 1933 to 1935. Datsyuk, Anze Kopitar, and Ron Francis are the only players to have been awarded both the Selke and Lady Byng trophies during their careers.

Datsyuk was selected to his third NHL All-Star Game in 2009, but due to a hip injury, he did not participate. However, as per a newly formed League policy stating players must demonstrate injury by missing at least one game prior to the All-Star Game, Datsyuk was suspended one game, along with teammate Nicklas Lidström, for not attending. On 13 February 2009, Datsyuk played in his 500th NHL game in a 3–2 loss to the Columbus Blue Jackets and recorded an assist in the game on a Nicklas Lidström goal. Datsyuk finished the 2008–09 season with 97 points (32 goals and 65 assists) in 81 games, matching his career high from the previous season. He also won the Frank J. Selke Trophy, beating out Philadelphia Flyers center Mike Richards and Vancouver Canucks center Ryan Kesler, and won the Lady Byng for the fourth consecutive season. Datsyuk also received a nomination for the Best NHL Player Award at the ESPYs, but lost to the Pittsburgh Penguins' center and captain Sidney Crosby. In game two in the third round of the 2009 playoffs against the Chicago Blackhawks, Datsyuk blocked a shot from a Chicago player, causing him to miss the remainder of the series. In his absence, Datsyuk and the Red Wings would reach the Stanley Cup Final for a second consecutive season against the Pittsburgh Penguins and third time under Datsyuk's career. After not playing the last three games of the third round and the first four games of the Finals, Datsyuk returned to the lineup for Game 5. Despite building a 3–2 series lead and on the verge of clinching a second straight championship, Datsyuk and the Red Wings would fall to the Penguins in games six and seven (both by 2–1 scores) to lose the series in seven games, one win short from a second consecutive Stanley Cup championship and third altogether. He ended the playoffs with a goal and eight assists for nine points in 16 games.

Datsyuk finished with his lowest end-of-season point total since the lockout in the 2009–10 season, scoring 70 points in 80 games for his third straight Selke Trophy. As a result of early season injuries to sniper Johan Franzén, center Valtteri Filppula and defenceman Niklas Kronwall, the Red Wings struggled to find consistency. However, a strong finish escalated the team from ninth place in the Western Conference in February to fifth place. Datsyuk scored the first two goals in game seven of the first round against the fourth-seeded Phoenix Coyotes, including a breakaway deke on Ilya Bryzgalov, that sent the Wings to the second round for the fourth consecutive playoff season. The Red Wings, however, lost in five games to the top-seeded San Jose Sharks.

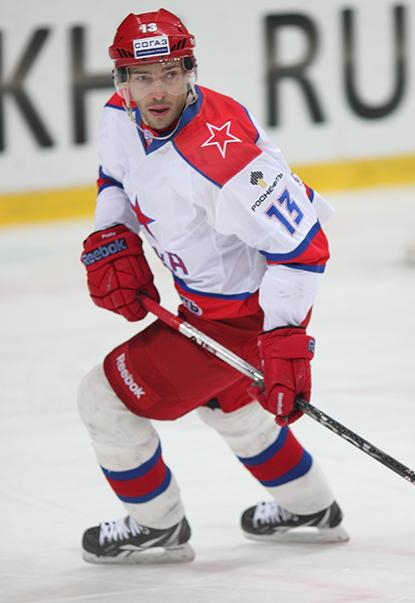
Datsyuk in November 2012 playing for CSKA during the 2012 NHL lockout

Datsyuk achieved a Gordie Howe hat trick on the opening night of the 2010–11 season on October 8, 2010, against the Anaheim Ducks with a goal, an assist and a fight, which came against Corey Perry. On 22 December, Datsyuk suffered a broken wrist in a game against the Vancouver Canucks as a result of a collision with Canucks' winger Mikael Samuelsson, causing him to miss the next 19 games. Despite an injury-shortened year, Datsyuk was named a finalist for the Selke Trophy for the fourth straight season, which ultimately went to Vancouver Canucks' center Ryan Kesler. After recording 23 goals, 36 assists and 59 points in 56 games in the regular season, Datsyuk was yet again impressive in the 2011 playoffs, leading his team with 15 points (four goals, 11 assists) in all 11 games. After sweeping the sixth-seeded Phoenix Coyotes in the first round, the Red Wings fell behind 3–0 to the second-seeded San Jose Sharks in the second round (which also happened the previous year), Datsyuk almost led his team back from the deficit to win the series; a game five-winning assist to Tomas Holmström's goal, a game six-winning assist to Valtteri Filppula's goal and a game seven late backhand goal on Sharks' goaltender Antti Niemi highlighted Datsyuk's heroics in an eventual losing effort.

During the entirety of the 2011 pre-season, Datsyuk wore jersey number 24 as a tribute to former teammate Ruslan Salei, who perished on 7 September 2011, in the Lokomotiv Yaroslavl plane crash, along with 43 others until switching back to his usual number 13 for the 2011–12 season. Datsyuk was an early-season candidate for the Hart Memorial Trophy, awarded to the League MVP, until surgery to remove fragments in his knee on 21 February 2012 forced the Red Wings into a slump. Despite him returning to the lineup after missing 11 games, the team dropped from first place in the Western Conference in February to fifth place at the end of the season, where they drew the fourth-seeded Nashville Predators in the first round of the 2012 playoffs, losing the series in five games. Datsyuk finished the season with 67 points (19 goals, 48 assists) in 70 games for the season followed by one goals, two assists and three points in all five playoff games, and was also named to the 2012 NHL All-Star Game in Ottawa. Datsyuk was also named a finalist for the Selke Trophy for the fifth straight season which was eventually awarded to Boston Bruins center Patrice Bergeron.

As the NHL entered its second lockout in eight years in 2012–13, Datsyuk followed other prominent NHL players, such as Washington Capitals winger and captain Alexander Ovechkin and Pittsburgh Penguins center Evgeni Malkin, in playing overseas while the lockout was in effect; he signed with CSKA Moscow of the Kontinental Hockey League (KHL) on 16 September 2012. Datsyuk tallied 36 points in 31 games. When play for the NHL resumed in January 2013 for a 48 game-shortened regular season, Datsyuk returned to the Red Wings and managed to score 15 goals, 34 assists for 49 points in 47 games. Datysuk was named a finalist for the Selke Trophy for the sixth straight year, ultimately ceding the award to Chicago Blackhawks center and captain Jonathan Toews. Detroit as a team finished as the seventh seed and as a result would take on the second-seeded Anaheim Ducks in the first round where they would upset them in seven games (recovering from a 3–2 series deficit along the way) and make it back to the second round of the 2013 playoffs where they were defeated by the presidents' Trophy-winning and eventual Stanley Cup champion Chicago Blackhawks in seven games via an overtime goal in game seven by Blackhawks defenceman Brent Seabrook. The Red Wings lost the series despite having a 3–1 series lead.

==== 2013–2016: Final years in Detroit ====
On 18 June 2013, Datsyuk signed a three-year extension to stay with Detroit. On 23 November, Datsyuk suffered a concussion against the Ottawa Senators as a result from a hit by Senators defenceman Jared Cowen, causing him to miss the next six games. Throughout the 2013–14 campaign, Datsyuk had also been hampered by a knee injury which resulted in him missing 15 games after the season resumed following the Olympic break. He finished the injury-shortened 2013–14 season with 17 goals and 20 assists for 37 points in 45 games played along with five points (three goals, two assists) in all five playoff games in a Red Wings first-round exit in the 2014 playoffs to the Presidents' Trophy-winning Boston Bruins.

Datsyuk missed the first five games of the 2014–15 regular season due to a separated shoulder sustained in a pre-season game against the Pittsburgh Penguins on 22 September 2014 as a result from a hit from Penguins' defenceman Rob Scuderi. He ultimately finished the season with 26 goals and 39 assists for 65 points in 63 contests played followed by five points (three goals, two assists) in all seven games in the 2015 playoffs in the Red Wings first seven-game round exit to the Tampa Bay Lightning and was a finalist for the Lady Byng Memorial Trophy for the sixth time in his career with former Red Wing teammate Jiri Hudler of the Calgary Flames receiving the award.

Datsyuk missed the first 15 games of the 2015–16 season recovering from ruptured tendons in his ankle that required surgery. On 14 February 2016, Datsyuk recorded his 900th point against in a 6–5 win over the Boston Bruins with a goal on Bruins' goaltender Tuukka Rask to become the sixth Red Wing player and fifth Russian player in league history to reach the milestone. Datsyuk was named the First Star of the Week for the week ending 15 February. He shared the league lead with five goals and tied for second overall with seven points in four games to help lead the Red Wings to seven out of a possible eight standings points. Datsyuk completed the 2015–16 season playing in 66 games with 16 goals, 33 assists and 49 points and was held pointless in all five games in the 2016 playoffs in the Red Wings first round exit to the Tampa Bay Lightning for the second straight season with this series ending in five games this time around.

On 18 June 2016, Datsyuk announced that he was leaving Detroit to play in Russia, ending his 14-year career with the Red Wings. He left the Wings having won two Stanley Cups (2002 and 2008), four consecutive Lady Byng trophies (2006, 2007, 2008, and 2009), 953 games played, and 918 points. He was the last remaining member of the Wings' 2002 Stanley Cup Championship team.

On 24 June 2016, the Red Wings traded Datsyuk's contract to the Arizona Coyotes with the 16th overall pick in the 2016 NHL entry draft for the 20th overall pick, the 53rd overall pick, and Joe Vitale to clear salary cap space.

=== Return to Russia (2016–2021) ===
==== SKA Saint Petersburg: 2016–2019 ====
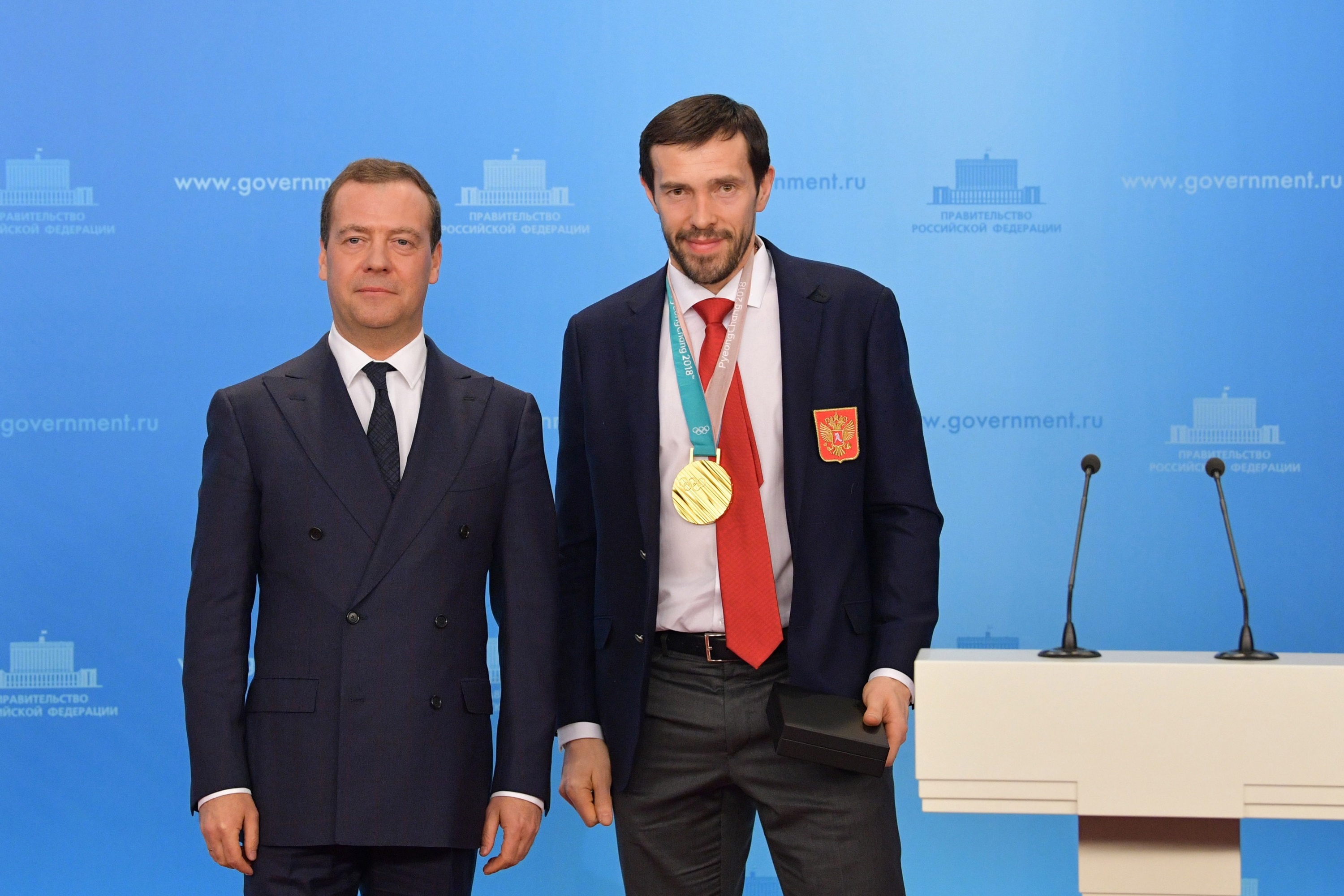
Datsyuk with Dmitry Medvedev after winning gold at the 2018 Winter Olympics in Pyeongchang

On 8 July 2016, Datsyuk signed a two-year contract with powerhouse SKA Saint Petersburg of the KHL. During the 2016–17 season, Datsyuk recorded 12 goals and 22 assists in 44 regular season games, and helped lead SKA Saint Petersburg to the Gagarin Cup in his first season back in the KHL. During the 2017–18 season, Datsyuk recorded eight goals and 27 assists in 37 regular season games. On 17 April 2018, Datsyuk signed a one-year contract extension with SKA Saint Petersburg.

He was named "Male Athlete of the Year" in the nomination "Pride of Russia" by the Ministry of Sport of Russia, leaving behind runner Sergey Shubenkov and cross-country skier Alexander Bolshunov.

==== Avtomobilist Yekaterinburg: 2019–2021 ====
Following completion of the 2018–19 season, his third with SKA, Datsyuk left the club as a free agent following the conclusion of his contract. On 5 June 2019, despite light speculation of a possible reunion with the Red Wings, Datsyuk opted to continue in the KHL, returning to play in his hometown with Avtomobilist Yekaterinburg on a one-year contract. On 10 July 2020, Datsyuk extended with Avtomobilist for another one-year contract. He retired in 2021.

== Playing style ==
Throughout his career in the NHL, Datsyuk was known as a top two-way forward with stellar play in both the offensive and defensive sides of the game. He won the Frank J. Selke Trophy as the league's best defensive forward three straight times in 2008, 2009 and 2010 and was also a finalist six straight times having also been named a finalist in 2011, 2012, 2013. In addition to his defensive style of play, Datsyuk was also well known for his backhand shot and ability to deke and maneuver around opposing players while stickhandling, a move that was eventually named "The Datsyukian" and Datsyuk himself being nicknamed "The Magic Man".

"I'd call Datsyuk a master chess player. As a goalie, your nightmare is when the puck carrier has multiple options. Datsyuk has a knack for seeing the entire ice and holding onto the puck until space opens up and he has a couple different plays he can make. He kind of stretches you and forces you to get caught in the middle of taking away the shot or taking away the pass. You have to commit to one or you're toast. It's a 50–50 gamble sometimes with him."

— Los Angeles Kings goaltender Jonathan Quick on Datsyuk, July 2015

== Personal life ==
At the age of 18, Datsyuk met his future wife Svetlana in Yekaterinburg. They married three years later, and had a daughter named Elizabeth in 2004. They divorced in 2010. Datsyuk got married for a second time in 2012; his new wife is named Maria. On 23 April 2014, she gave birth to his second child, a daughter named Vasilisa. His third child, a son named Pavel Jr., was born in February 2017.

He is a Russian Orthodox Christian.

== Career achievements ==
=== International ===
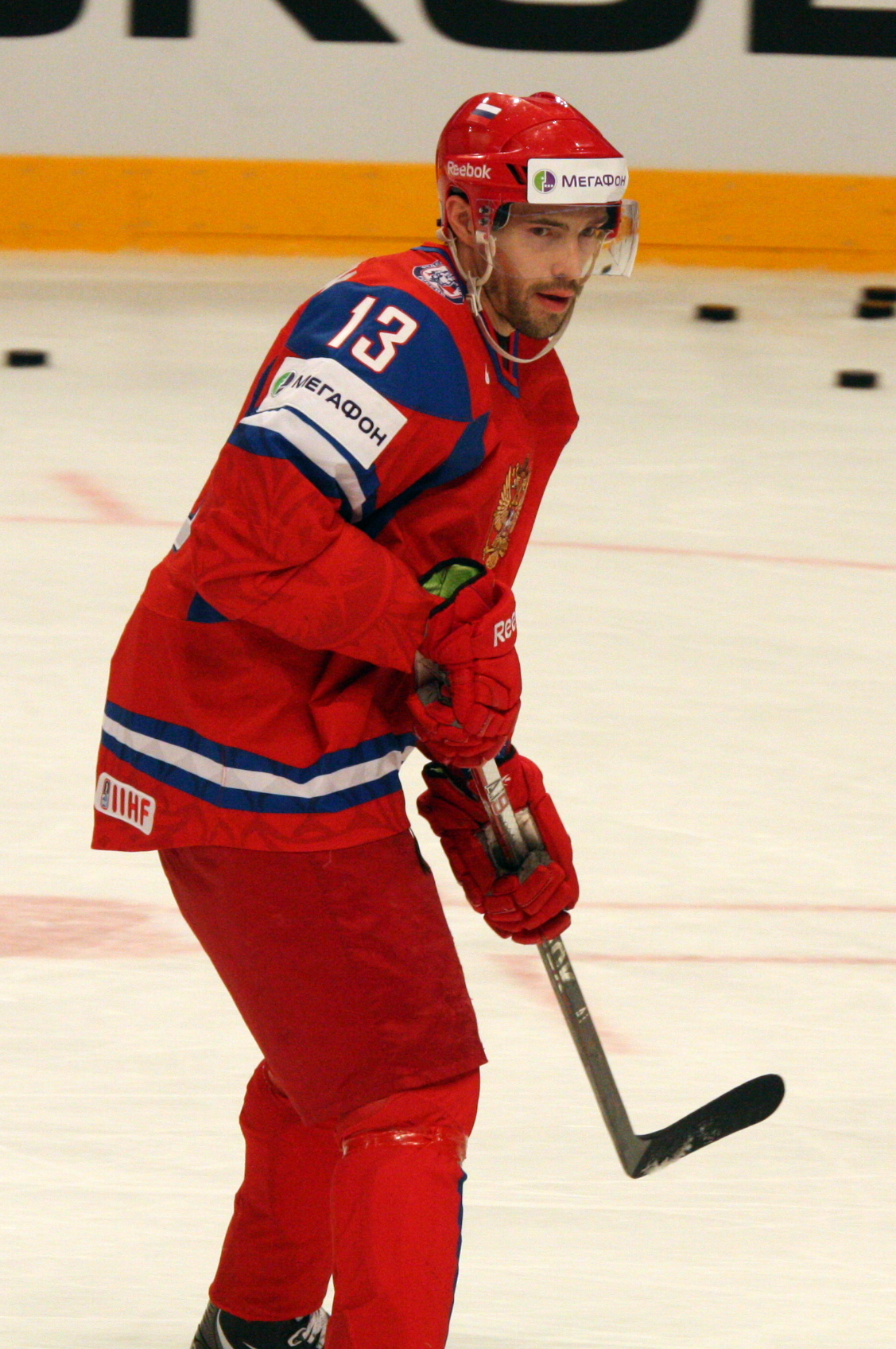
- Datsyuk warming up during a 2012 World Championship game

Medal record

Men's ice hockey

Representing Olympic Athletes from Russia

Olympic Games
| Gold medal – first place | 2018 Pyeongchang | |

Representing Russia

Olympic Games
| Bronze medal – third place | 2002 Salt Lake City | |

World Championships
| Gold medal – first place | 2012 Finland/Sweden | |
| Silver medal – second place | 2010 Germany | |
| Bronze medal – third place | 2005 Austria | |
| Bronze medal – third place | 2016 Russia | |

- World Championship best forward – 2010
- World Championship All-Star team – 2010
- Olympic All-Star team – 2018

=== NHL ===
- 2-time Stanley Cup champion – 2002, 2008
- NHL Second All-Star team – 2009
- Selected to the NHL All-Star Game – 2004, 2008, 2009*, 2012
- Played in the NHL YoungStars Game – 2002
- Lady Byng Memorial Trophy – 2006, 2007, 2008, 2009
- Frank J. Selke Trophy – 2008, 2009, 2010
- NHL Plus-Minus Award – 2008
- NHL Offensive Player of the Month – December 2003
- Carhartt "Hardest Working" Player of the Month – December 2007
- 2010–11 NHL Players Poll: Hardest to Take the Puck Off of; Cleanest Player.
- 2011–12 NHL Players Poll: Smartest Player; Most Difficult to Play Against; Hardest to Take the Puck From; Most Difficult to Stop; Cleanest Player; Toughest Forward to Play Against.
- Selected as one of the 100 Greatest NHL Players (2017)
- Elected to Hockey Hall of Fame – 2024

=== KHL ===
- Gagarin Cup champion – 2017
- 2-time KHL All-Star – 2013, 2017
- Sergey Gimayev Prize (top veteran player) – 2021

=== Other ===
- Kharlamov Trophy – 2011, 2013

== Career statistics ==
=== Regular season and playoffs ===
| | | | Regular season | | | | | Playoffs |
| Season | Team | League | GP | G | A | Pts | PIM | GP | G | A | Pts | PIM |
|---|---|---|---|---|---|---|---|---|---|---|---|---|
| 1994–95 | SKA Avtomobilist–2 Yekaterinburg | RUS.2 | 8 | 0 | 1 | 1 | 4 | — | — | — | — | — |
| 1995–96 | SKA Avtomobilist–2 Yekaterinburg | RUS.2 | 44 | 8 | 9 | 17 | 8 | — | — | — | — | — |
| 1996–97 | Spartak Yekaterinburg | RSL | 18 | 2 | 2 | 4 | 4 | — | — | — | — | — |
| 1996–97 | SKA Yekaterinburg | RUS.3 | 7 | 3 | 3 | 6 | 2 | — | — | — | — | — |
| 1997–98 | Dinamo–Energija Yekaterinburg | RSL | 24 | 3 | 4 | 7 | 4 | — | — | — | — | — |
| 1998–99 | Dinamo–Energija Yekaterinburg | RUS.2 | 13 | 9 | 8 | 17 | 2 | — | — | — | — | — |
| 1998–99 | Dinamo–Energija–2 Yekaterinburg | RUS.3 | 10 | 14 | 14 | 28 | 4 | — | — | — | — | — |
| 1999–2000 | Dinamo–Energija Yekaterinburg | RSL | 15 | 1 | 3 | 4 | 4 | — | — | — | — | — |
| 2000–01 | Ak Bars Kazan | RSL | 42 | 9 | 19 | 28 | 12 | 4 | 0 | 1 | 1 | 2 |
| 2001–02 | Detroit Red Wings | NHL | 70 | 11 | 24 | 35 | 4 | 21 | 3 | 3 | 6 | 2 |
| 2002–03 | Detroit Red Wings | NHL | 64 | 12 | 39 | 51 | 16 | 4 | 0 | 0 | 0 | 0 |
| 2003–04 | Detroit Red Wings | NHL | 75 | 30 | 38 | 68 | 35 | 12 | 0 | 6 | 6 | 2 |
| 2004–05 | Dynamo Moscow | RSL | 47 | 15 | 17 | 32 | 16 | 10 | 6 | 3 | 9 | 4 |
| 2005–06 | Detroit Red Wings | NHL | 75 | 28 | 59 | 87 | 22 | 5 | 0 | 3 | 3 | 0 |
| 2006–07 | Detroit Red Wings | NHL | 79 | 27 | 60 | 87 | 20 | 18 | 8 | 8 | 16 | 8 |
| 2007–08 | Detroit Red Wings | NHL | 82 | 31 | 66 | 97 | 20 | 22 | 10 | 13 | 23 | 6 |
| 2008–09 | Detroit Red Wings | NHL | 81 | 32 | 65 | 97 | 22 | 16 | 1 | 8 | 9 | 5 |
| 2009–10 | Detroit Red Wings | NHL | 80 | 27 | 43 | 70 | 18 | 12 | 6 | 7 | 13 | 8 |
| 2010–11 | Detroit Red Wings | NHL | 56 | 23 | 36 | 59 | 15 | 11 | 4 | 11 | 15 | 8 |
| 2011–12 | Detroit Red Wings | NHL | 70 | 19 | 48 | 67 | 14 | 5 | 1 | 2 | 3 | 2 |
| 2012–13 | CSKA Moscow | KHL | 31 | 11 | 25 | 36 | 4 | — | — | — | — | — |
| 2012–13 | Detroit Red Wings | NHL | 47 | 15 | 34 | 49 | 14 | 14 | 3 | 6 | 9 | 4 |
| 2013–14 | Detroit Red Wings | NHL | 45 | 17 | 20 | 37 | 6 | 5 | 3 | 2 | 5 | 0 |
| 2014–15 | Detroit Red Wings | NHL | 63 | 26 | 39 | 65 | 8 | 7 | 3 | 2 | 5 | 2 |
| 2015–16 | Detroit Red Wings | NHL | 66 | 16 | 33 | 49 | 14 | 5 | 0 | 0 | 0 | 4 |
| 2016–17 | SKA Saint Petersburg | KHL | 44 | 12 | 22 | 34 | 14 | 7 | 3 | 5 | 8 | 27 |
| 2017–18 | SKA Saint Petersburg | KHL | 37 | 8 | 27 | 35 | 8 | 15 | 4 | 3 | 7 | 0 |
| 2018–19 | SKA Saint Petersburg | KHL | 54 | 12 | 30 | 42 | 6 | 12 | 1 | 6 | 7 | 4 |
| 2019–20 | Avtomobilist Yekaterinburg | KHL | 43 | 5 | 17 | 22 | 10 | 4 | 2 | 2 | 4 | 2 |
| 2020–21 | Avtomobilist Yekaterinburg | KHL | 51 | 12 | 23 | 35 | 10 | 5 | 1 | 2 | 3 | 0 |
| RSL totals | | | 146 | 30 | 45 | 75 | 40 | 14 | 6 | 4 | 10 | 6 |
| NHL totals | | | 953 | 314 | 604 | 918 | 228 | 157 | 42 | 71 | 113 | 55 |
| KHL totals | | | 260 | 60 | 144 | 204 | 52 | 43 | 11 | 18 | 29 | 33 |

=== International ===
| Year | Team | Event | Result | GP | G | A | Pts | PIM |
|---|---|---|---|---|---|---|---|---|
| 2001 | Russia | WC | 6th | 7 | 0 | 4 | 4 | 0 |
| 2002 | Russia | OG | 3rd place, bronze medalist(s) | 6 | 1 | 2 | 3 | 0 |
| 2003 | Russia | WC | 7th | 7 | 1 | 4 | 5 | 0 |
| 2004 | Russia | WCH | 5th | 4 | 1 | 0 | 1 | 0 |
| 2005 | Russia | WC | 3rd place, bronze medalist(s) | 9 | 3 | 4 | 7 | 0 |
| 2006 | Russia | OG | 4th | 8 | 1 | 7 | 8 | 10 |
| 2010 | Russia | OG | 6th | 4 | 1 | 2 | 3 | 2 |
| 2010 | Russia | WC | 2nd place, silver medalist(s) | 6 | 6 | 1 | 7 | 0 |
| 2012 | Russia | WC | 1st place, gold medalist(s) | 10 | 3 | 4 | 7 | 2 |
| 2014 | Russia | OG | 5th | 5 | 2 | 4 | 6 | 0 |
| 2016 | Russia | WC | 3rd place, bronze medalist(s) | 10 | 1 | 10 | 11 | 0 |
| 2016 | Russia | WCH | 4th | 2 | 0 | 2 | 2 | 0 |
| 2018 | OAR | OG | 1st place, gold medalist(s) | 6 | 0 | 6 | 6 | 0 |
| 2018 | Russia | WC | 6th | 8 | 2 | 8 | 10 | 2 |
| Senior totals | | | | 92 | 22 | 58 | 80 | 16 |

Awards and achievements
| Preceded by Brad Richards | Lady Byng Memorial Trophy winner 2006, 2007, 2008, 2009 | Succeeded by Martin St. Louis |
| Preceded by Thomas Vanek | Winner of the NHL Plus/Minus Award; 2008 | Succeeded by Award discontinued |
| Preceded by Rod Brind'Amour | Frank J. Selke Trophy winner 2008, 2009, 2010 | Succeeded by Ryan Kesler |
