= NHL Plus-Minus Award =

Ice hockey award

NHL Plus/Minus Award
- Sport: Ice hockey
- Awarded for: A player, having played a minimum of 60 games, who leads the league in plus/minus statistics

History
- First award: 1982–83 NHL season
- Final award: 2007–08 NHL season

The NHL Plus/Minus Award was a trophy awarded annually by the National Hockey League to the ice hockey "player, having played a minimum of 60 games, who leads the league in plus-minus statistics." It was sponsored by a commercial business, and it had been known under five different names. First given for performance during the 1982–83 season, Wayne Gretzky won the award the most times, with three. Gretzky also led the league once prior to the inception of the award. Bobby Orr has led the NHL the most times in plus-minus, with six, all prior to the inception of the award. The award was discontinued after being awarded to Pavel Datsyuk following the 2007–08 season.

== History ==
The plus/minus statistic was first established during the 1967–68 NHL season. This statistic reflects a player's ability to contribute offensively and defensively. The award was first given at the end of the 1982–83 season. From 1982–83 to 1987–88, it was known as the Emery Edge Award. During 1988–89, there was no formal name for the Award. From 1989–90 to 1995–96, it was known as the Alka-Seltzer Plus Award. From 1996–97 to 1997–98, it was known as the Bud Ice Plus-Minus Award. Finally, from 1998–99 to 2007–08, it was known as the Bud Light Plus-Minus Award.

Three-time winner Wayne Gretzky won the award the most times out of any player, and is one of only three repeat winners, joined by two-time winners John LeClair and Chris Pronger. Gretzky recorded the highest single-season result, +100, of all Award winners. The Award was won by players on the Edmonton Oilers and Detroit Red Wings four times each, with three wins by players on the Calgary Flames, Colorado Avalanche, Philadelphia Flyers, Pittsburgh Penguins and St. Louis Blues.

Including the 20 seasons the League tracked plus-minus as a statistic without an award, the Boston Bruins have led the League 11 times (six by Bobby Orr and twice by David Krejci, the only other repeat leaders), Edmonton Oilers five times (four by Wayne Gretzky, including three official awards) and four times each by players on the Detroit Red Wings, Montreal Canadiens and Philadelphia Flyers.

== Winners ==
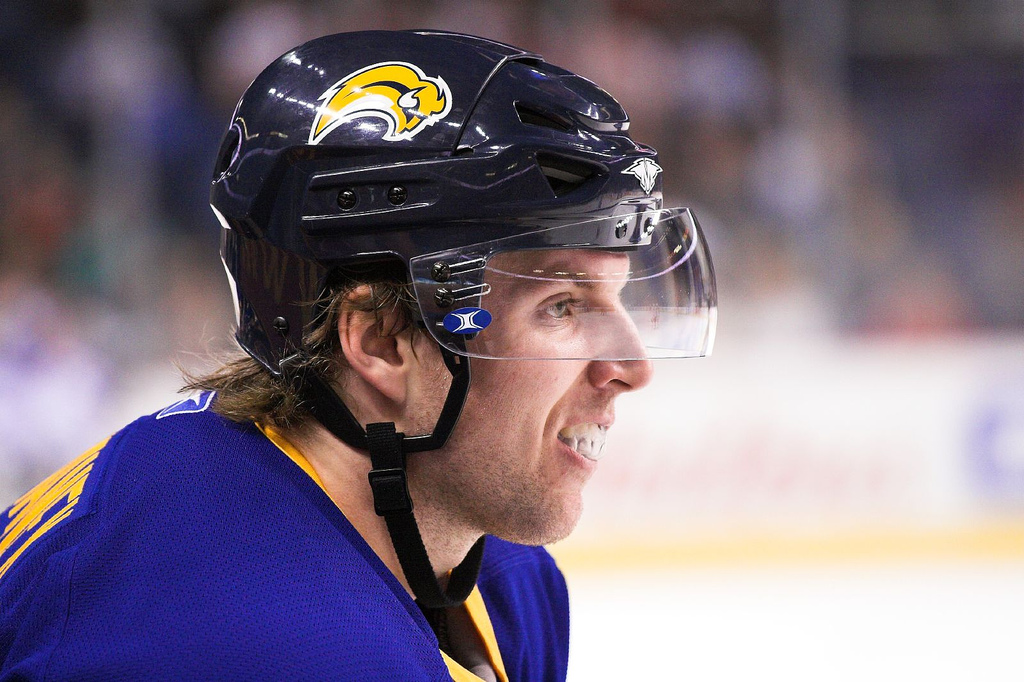
Thomas Vanek, one-time winner

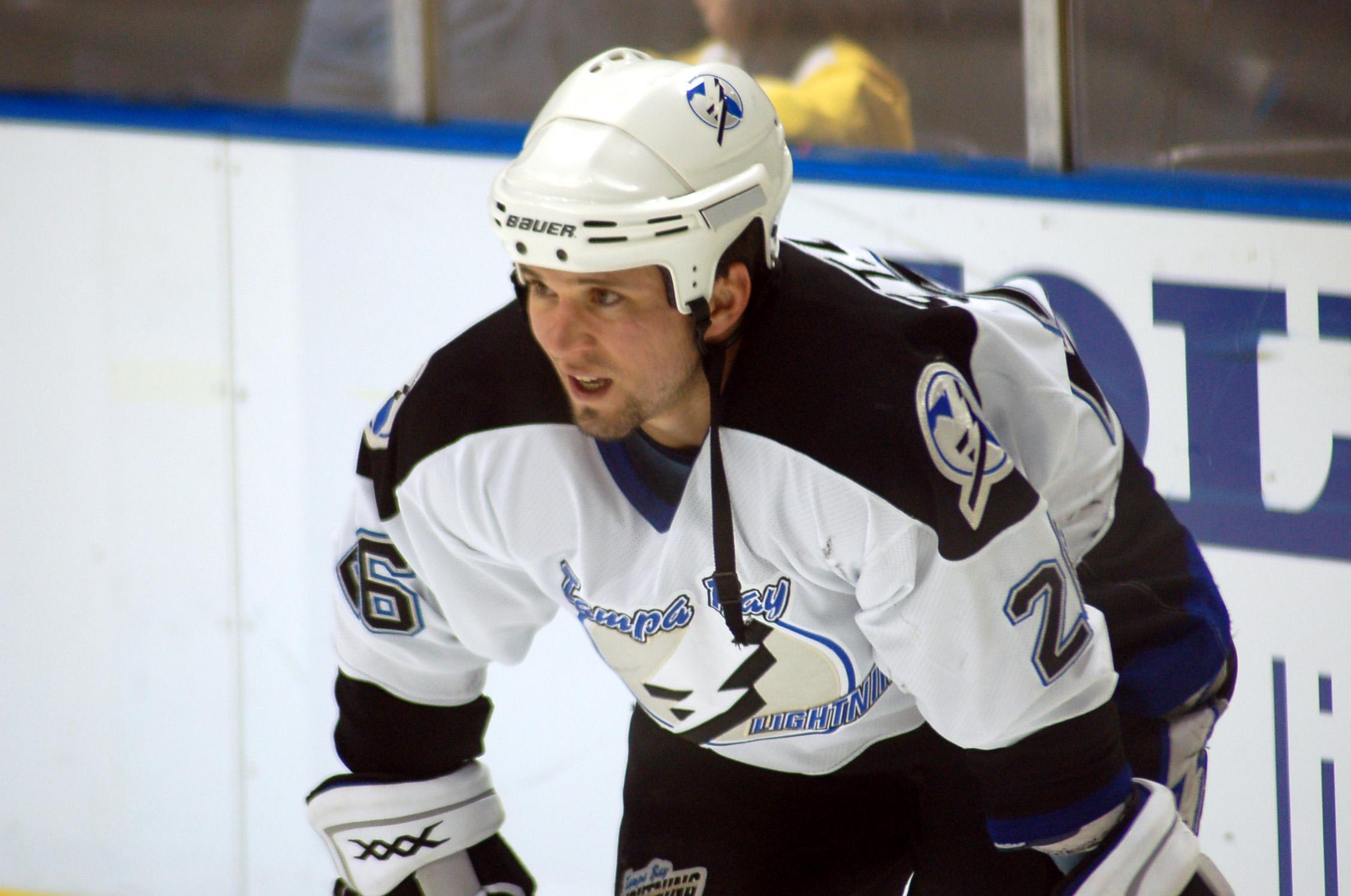
Martin St. Louis, one-time winner

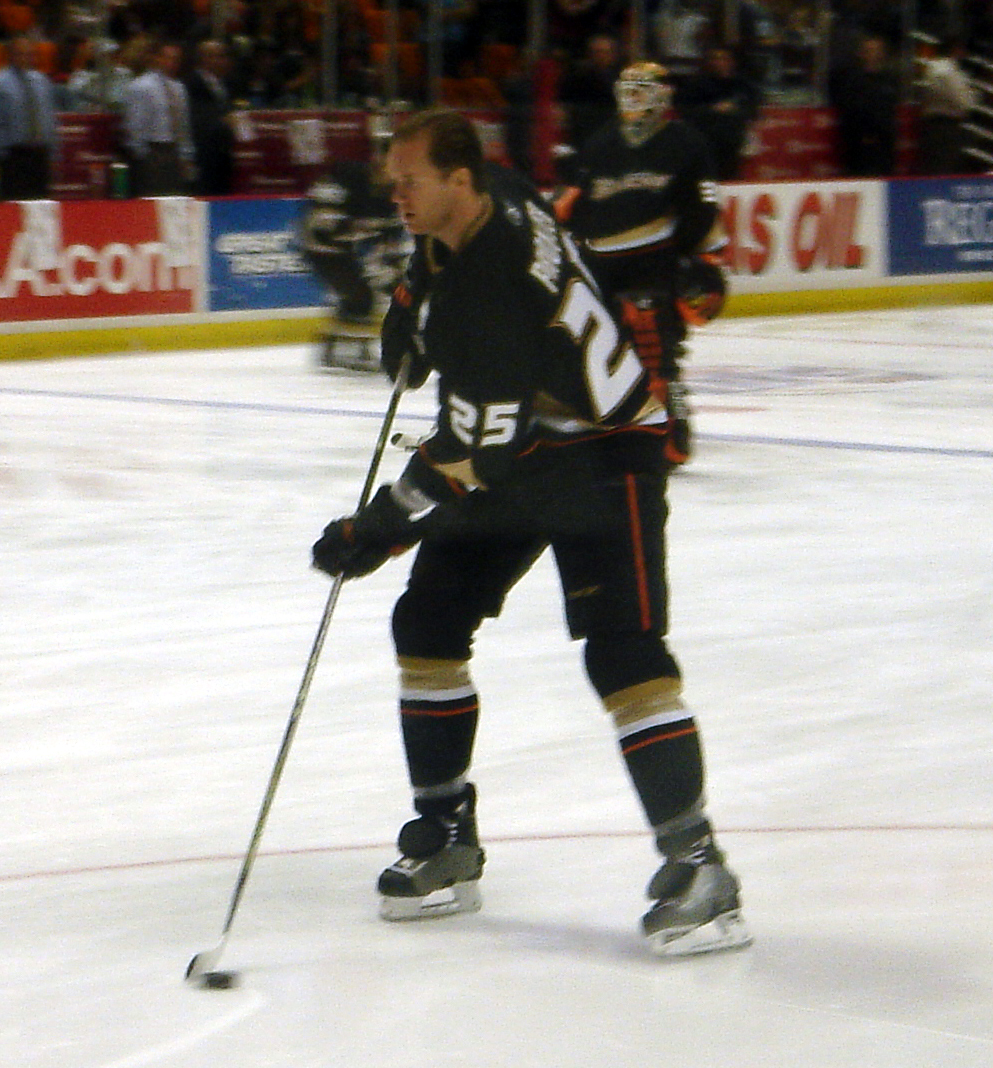
Chris Pronger, two-time winner

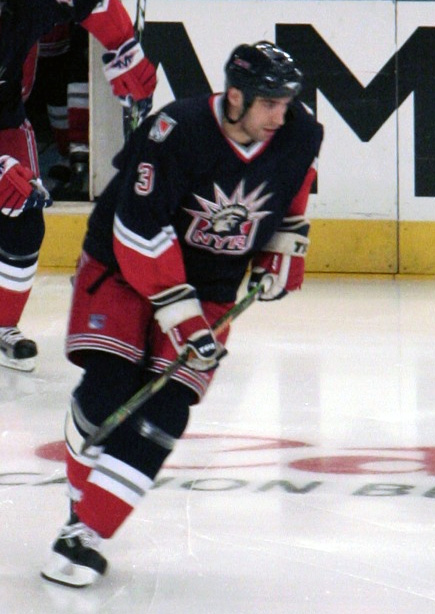
Michal Rozsival, one-time winner

* Season shortened by the 1994–95 NHL lockout

Positions key
C	Centre	LW	Left wing	RW	Right wing	F	Forward	D	Defence

Player is still active in the NHL

Bold Player with the best plus-minus ever recorded in a season.

=== Plus-minus leaders (1959–1982) ===
Before 1983, there was no award for leading the League in plus-minus. The NHL started counting the statistics in 1967, while records have been compiled by the NHL for plus-minus back to 1959. This table lists all the leaders from the available statistics to the inception of the award.

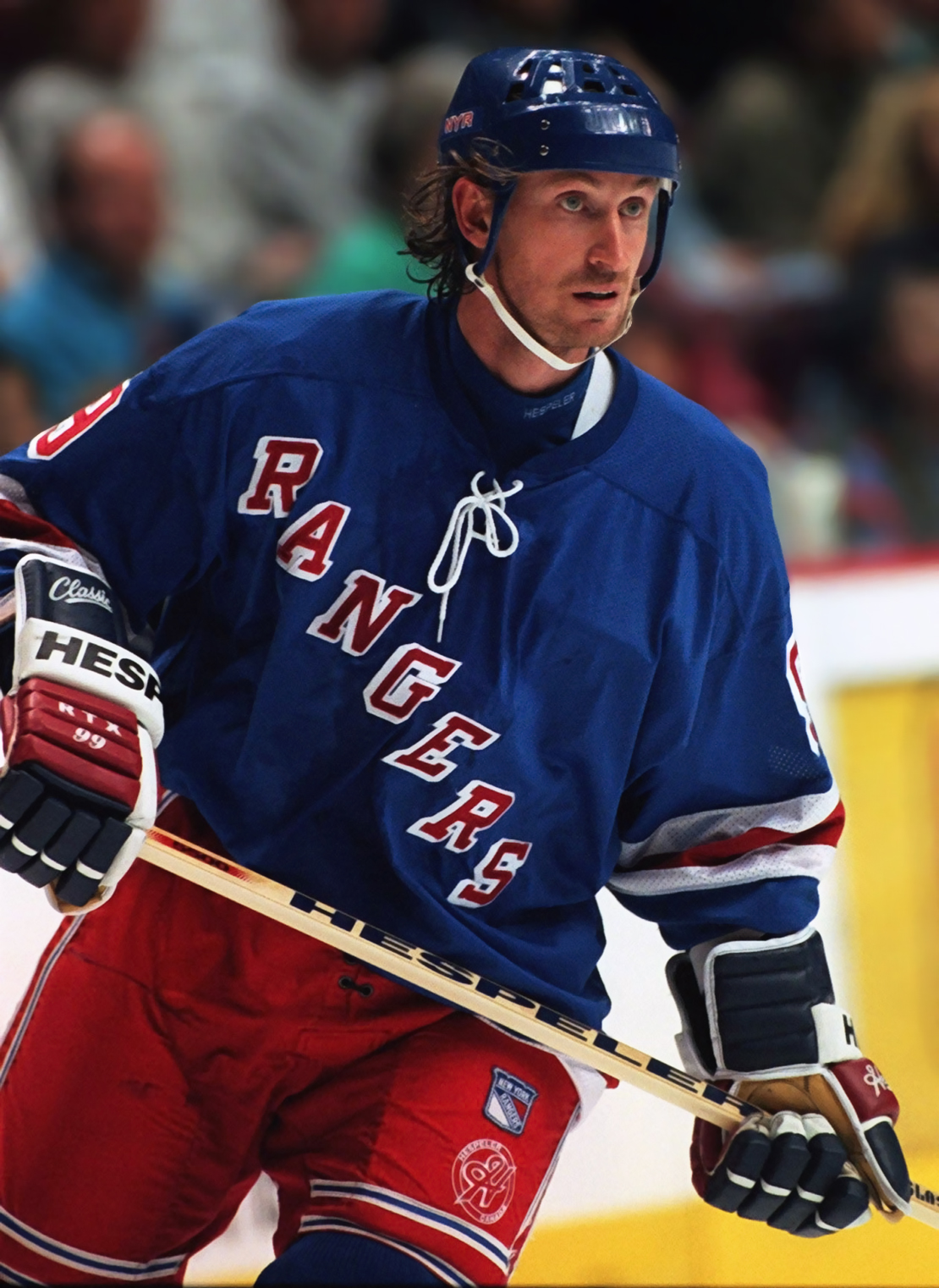
Wayne Gretzky, three-time winner (four-time leader)

Season	Player	Team	Position	Rating	Win #
1959–60	Doug Harvey	Montreal Canadiens	D	+37	1
1960–61	Tim Horton	Toronto Maple Leafs	D	+31	1
1961–62	Lou Fontinato	Montreal Canadiens	D	+55	1
1962–63	Carl Brewer	Toronto Maple Leafs	D	+32	1
1963–64	Pierre Pilote	Chicago Black Hawks	D	+31	1
1964–65	Carl Brewer	Toronto Maple Leafs	D	+33	2
1965–66	Ted Harris	Montreal Canadiens	D	+34	1
1966–67	Pierre Pilote	Chicago Black Hawks	D	+54	2
1967–68	Dallas Smith	Boston Bruins	D	+33	1
1968–69	Phil Esposito	Boston Bruins	C	+55	1
1968–69	Bobby Orr	Boston Bruins	D	+55	1
1969–70	Bobby Orr	Boston Bruins	D	+54	2
1970–71	Bobby Orr	Boston Bruins	D	+124	3
1971–72	Bobby Orr	Boston Bruins	D	+83	4
1972–73	Jacques Laperriere	Montreal Canadiens	D	+77	1
1973–74	Bobby Orr	Boston Bruins	D	+84	5
1974–75	Bobby Orr	Boston Bruins	D	+80	6
1975–76	Bobby Clarke	Philadelphia Flyers	C	+83	1
1976–77	Larry Robinson	Montreal Canadiens	D	+120	1
1977–78	Guy Lafleur	Montreal Canadiens	RW	+73	1
1978–79	Bryan Trottier	New York Islanders	C	+76	1
1979–80	Jim Schoenfeld	Buffalo Sabres	D	+60	1
1980–81	Brian Engblom	Montreal Canadiens	D	+63	1
1981–82	Wayne Gretzky	Edmonton Oilers	C	+80	1

=== Plus-minus leaders (1982–2008) ===
From 1982–83 to 2007–08, the League awarded the player with the best plus-minus. This lists the winners of the plus-minus award by season.

Season	Player	Team	Position	Rating	Win #
1982–83	Charlie Huddy	Edmonton Oilers	D	+63	1
1983–84	Wayne Gretzky	Edmonton Oilers	C	+76	1
1984–85	Wayne Gretzky	Edmonton Oilers	C	+100	2
1985–86	Mark Howe	Philadelphia Flyers	D	+85	1
1986–87	Wayne Gretzky	Edmonton Oilers	C	+70	3
1987–88	Brad McCrimmon	Calgary Flames	D	+48	1
1988–89	Joe Mullen	Calgary Flames	F	+51	1
1989–90	Paul Cavallini	St. Louis Blues	D	+38	1
1990–91	Marty McSorley^{1}	Los Angeles Kings	D	+48	1
1990–91	Theoren Fleury^{1}	Calgary Flames	RW	+48	1
1991–92	Paul Ysebaert	Detroit Red Wings	LW	+44	1
1992–93	Mario Lemieux	Pittsburgh Penguins	C	+55	1
1993–94	Scott Stevens	New Jersey Devils	D	+53	1
1994–95*	Ron Francis	Pittsburgh Penguins	C	+30	1
1995–96	Vladimir Konstantinov	Detroit Red Wings	D	+60	1
1996–97	John LeClair	Philadelphia Flyers	C	+44	1
1997–98	Chris Pronger	St. Louis Blues	D	+47	1
1998–99	John LeClair^{2}	Philadelphia Flyers	LW	+36	2
1999–2000	Chris Pronger	St. Louis Blues	D	+52	2
2000–01	Patrik Elias^{3}	New Jersey Devils	LW	+45	1
2000–01	Joe Sakic^{3}	Colorado Avalanche	C	+45	1
2001–02	Chris Chelios	Detroit Red Wings	D	+40	1
2002–03	Peter Forsberg^{4}	Colorado Avalanche	C	+52	1
2002–03	Milan Hejduk^{4}	Colorado Avalanche	RW	+52	1
2003–04	Martin St. Louis^{5}	Tampa Bay Lightning	RW	+35	1
2003–04	Marek Malik^{5}	Vancouver Canucks	D	+35	1
2004–05	Season cancelled due to the 2004–05 NHL lockout				
2005–06	Wade Redden^{6}	Ottawa Senators	D	+35	1
2005–06	Michal Rozsival^{6}	New York Rangers	D	+35	1
2006–07	Thomas Vanek	Buffalo Sabres	LW	+47	1
2007–08	Pavel Datsyuk	Detroit Red Wings	C	+41	1

=== Plus-minus leaders (2008–present) ===
After 2007–08, the League no longer officially awarded the player with the best plus-minus. This lists the leaders of each season from 2008.

* Season shortened by the 2012–13 NHL lockout
† Season shortened by the COVID-19 pandemic

Season	Player	Team	Position	Rating	Win #
2008–09	David Krejci	Boston Bruins	C	+37	1
2009–10	Jeff Schultz	Washington Capitals	D	+50	1
2010–11	Zdeno Chara	Boston Bruins	D	+33	1
2011–12	Patrice Bergeron	Boston Bruins	C	+36	1
2012–13*	Pascal Dupuis	Pittsburgh Penguins	RW	+31	1
2013–14	David Krejci	Boston Bruins	C	+39	2
2014–15	Nikita Kucherov^{7}	Tampa Bay Lightning	RW	+38	1
2014–15	Max Pacioretty^{7}	Montreal Canadiens	LW	+38	1
2015–16	Tyler Toffoli	Los Angeles Kings	C	+35	1
2016–17	Ryan Suter^{8}	Minnesota Wild	D	+34	1
2016–17	Jason Zucker^{8}	Minnesota Wild	LW	+34	1
2017–18	William Karlsson	Vegas Golden Knights	C	+49	1
2018–19	Mark Giordano	Calgary Flames	D	+39	1
2019–20†	Ryan Graves	Colorado Avalanche	D	+40	1
2020–21†	Mikko Rantanen	Colorado Avalanche	RW	+30	1
2021–22	Johnny Gaudreau	Calgary Flames	LW	+64	1
2022–23	Hampus Lindholm	Boston Bruins	D	+49	1
2023–24	Gustav Forsling	Florida Panthers	D	+56	1
2024–25	Ryan McDonagh	Tampa Bay Lightning	D	+43	1
2025–26	Nathan MacKinnon	Colorado Avalanche	C	+57	1

=== Situational plus–minus leaders (2007–present) ===
While not all types of goals are included in the calculation of plus-minus — such as power play goals — and every other type of goal is weighed the same, situational plus–minus (Sit +/−) allows for each goal to be included by adjusting by the number of skaters (i.e. not goaltenders) on the ice at the time of the goal, to accommodate for special-team and empty net goals. The plus–minus rating is calculated by dividing the number of skaters on the ice for the team scored upon by the number of skaters on the ice for the scoring team, applied as a plus to all players (including goaltenders) on the ice for the scoring team and as a minus for all players (including goaltenders) on the ice for the team scored upon. This also allows the statistics to be applied to goaltenders.

* Season shortened by the 2012–13 NHL lockout
† Season shortened by the COVID-19 pandemic

	Best situational plus–minus					Worst situational plus–minus				
Season	Player	Team	Position	NHL +/−	Sit +/−	Player	Team	Position	NHL +/−	Sit +/−
2007−08	Pavel Datsyuk	Detroit Red Wings	C	+41	+75.30	Jamal Mayers	St. Louis Blues	RW	−19	−41.86
2008–09	Mike Green	Washington Capitals	D	+24	+70.76	Brendan Witt	New York Islanders	D	−34	−56.22
2009–10	Alex Ovechkin	Washington Capitals	LW	+45	+87.71	Nate Thompson	New York Islanders, Tampa Bay Lightning	C	−17	−46.00
2010–11	Daniel Sedin	Vancouver Canucks	LW	+30	+73.63	Chris Phillips	Ottawa Senators	D	−35	−52.77
2011–12	Marc-Andre Fleury	Pittsburgh Penguins	G	N/A	+59.61	Milan Jurcina	New York Islanders	D	−34	−45.67
2012–13*	Chris Kunitz	Pittsburgh Penguins	LW	+30	+52.55	Erik Gudbranson	Florida Panthers	D	−22	−28.20
2013–14	Chris Kunitz	Pittsburgh Penguins	LW	+25	+62.04	Steve Ott	Buffalo Sabres, St. Louis Blues	C	−38	−48.09
2014–15	Nikita Kucherov	Tampa Bay Lightning	RW	+38	+54.85	Mike Smith	Arizona Coyotes	G	N/A	−76.31
2015–16	Alex Ovechkin	Washington Capitals	LW	+21	+60.65	Bo Horvat	Vancouver Canucks	C	−30	−38.15
2016–17	Braden Holtby	Washington Capitals	G	N/A	+63.28	Fedor Tyutin	Colorado Avalanche	D	−25	−45.07
2017–18	Connor Hellebuyck	Winnipeg Jets	G	N/A	+67.44	Johan Larsson	Buffalo Sabres	C	−30	−46.50
2018–19	Brayden Point	Tampa Bay Lightning	C	+27	+72.77	Adam Larsson	Edmonton Oilers	D	−28	−46.52
2019–20†	Artemi Panarin	New York Rangers	LW	+36	+64.04	Filip Hronek	Detroit Red Wings	D	−38	−53.69
2020–21†	Philipp Grubauer	Colorado Avalanche	G	N/A	+64.13	David Savard	Columbus Blue Jackets, Tampa Bay Lightning	D	−27	−37.82
2021–22	Johnny Gaudreau	Calgary Flames	LW	+64	+94.80	Karel Vejmelka	Arizona Coyotes	G	N/A	−57.20
2022−23	Connor McDavid	Edmonton Oilers	C	+22	+83.35	John Gibson	Anaheim Ducks	G	N/A	−79.24
2023–24	Nathan MacKinnon	Colorado Avalanche	C	+34	+84.21	Mario Ferraro	San Jose Sharks	D	−38	−67.37
2024–25	Connor Hellebuyck	Winnipeg Jets	G	N/A	+86.05	Rasmus Andersson	Calgary Flames	D	−38	−53.18
2025–26	Nathan MacKinnon	Colorado Avalanche	C	+57	+88.02	Kevin Lankinen	Vancouver Canucks	G	N/A	−57.41

== See also ==
- List of National Hockey League awards
- List of NHL players
- List of NHL statistical leaders

== Notes ==
During the 1990–91 season, there was a tie between Marty McSorley of the Los Angeles Kings and Theoren Fleury of the Calgary Flames.
During the 1998–99 season, Alexander Karpovtsev led the League with a +39 rating. However, he played in 58 games and was ineligible since there is a 60-game minimum. Therefore, LeClair was given the award with a +36 rating.
During the 2000–01 season, there was a tie between Joe Sakic of the Colorado Avalanche and Patrik Elias of the New Jersey Devils.
During the 2002–03 season, there was a tie between Peter Forsberg and Milan Hejduk of the Colorado Avalanche.
During the 2003–04 season, there was a tie between Martin St. Louis of the Tampa Bay Lighting and Marek Malik of the Vancouver Canucks.
During the 2005–06 season, there was a tie between Michal Rozsival of the New York Rangers and Wade Redden of the Ottawa Senators.
During the 2014–15 season, there was a tie between Nikita Kucherov of the Tampa Bay Lighting and Max Pacioretty of the Montreal Canadiens.
During the 2016–17 season, there was a tie between Ryan Suter and Jason Zucker of the Minnesota Wild.
