= Marek Malík =

Czech ice hockey player (born 1975)

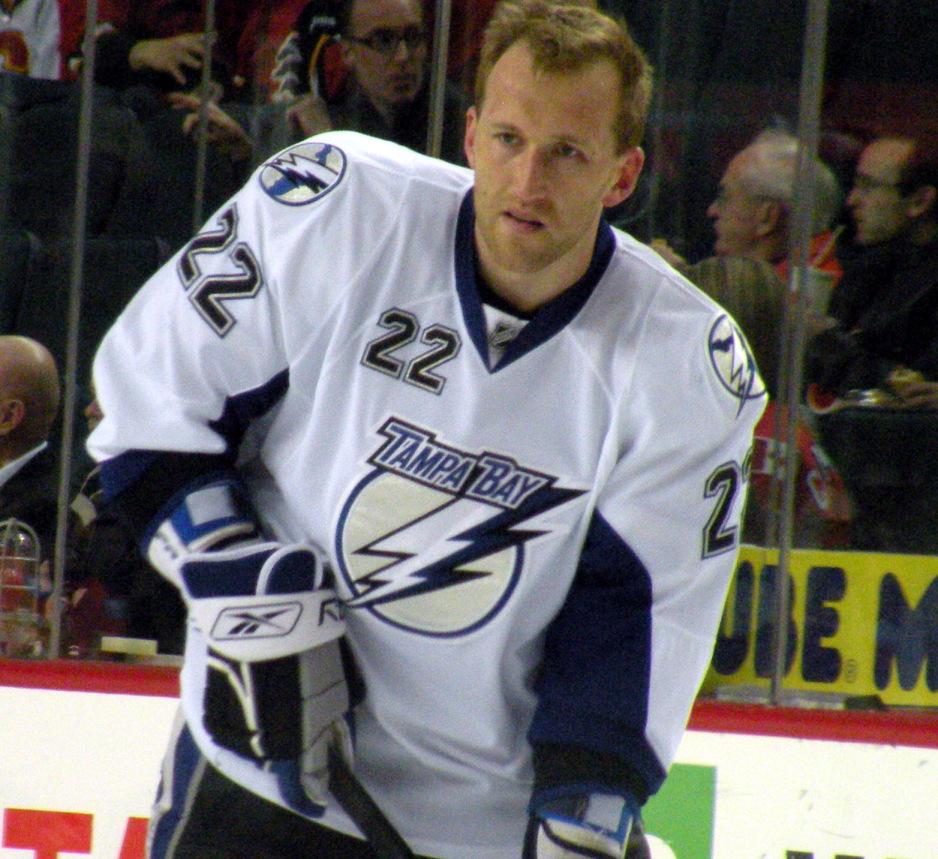
- Born: June 24, 1975 (age 51) Ostrava, Czechoslovakia
- Height: 6 ft 6 in (198 cm)
- Weight: 240 lb (109 kg; 17 st 2 lb)
- Position: Defence
- Shot: Left
- Played for: HC Vítkovice; Hartford Whalers; Malmö Redhawks; Carolina Hurricanes; Vancouver Canucks; New York Rangers; Tampa Bay Lightning; Genève-Servette HC; HC TWK Innsbruck
- National team: Czech Republic
- NHL draft: 72nd overall, 1993; Hartford Whalers
- Playing career: 1993–2014

Marek Malík (born June 24, 1975) is a Czech former professional ice hockey defenceman who played in the National Hockey League (NHL) from 1994 to 2009.

== Playing career ==
After playing with TJ Vitkovice Jr. in the Czech junior league, Malík was drafted 72nd overall by the Hartford Whalers in the 1993 NHL entry draft. He played one season for HC Vítkovice of the Czech Extraliga before joining the Whalers' American Hockey League (AHL) affiliate, the Springfield Falcons, in 1994–95. He played the better part of two seasons with the Falcons before earning a roster spot with the Whalers. Marek scored his first career NHL goal on October 19, 1996, against Jeff Reese and the New Jersey Devils in a 6–2 Whalers victory.

While the Whalers' franchise relocated to Raleigh, North Carolina in 1997–98 to become the Carolina Hurricanes, Malík played in Sweden's Elitserien with the Malmö Redhawks. He returned to the NHL the following season with the Hurricanes. In 2001–02, Malík recorded a career-high 23 points. The following season, his ninth with the Whalers/Hurricanes franchise, Malík was traded to the Vancouver Canucks along with Darren Langdon in exchange for Jan Hlaváč and Harold Druken. He completed his second season with the Canucks, in 2003–04, as co-recipient of the NHL Plus/Minus Award (shared with Martin St. Louis of the Tampa Bay Lightning) with a +35 rating.

During the 2004–05 NHL lockout, Malík returned to the Czech Extraliga to play for HC Vítkovice. With NHL play set to resume the following season, he signed a three-year deal with the New York Rangers.

On November 26, 2005, Malík scored on Washington Capitals netminder Olaf Kölzig to finish the then longest shootout in NHL history. The goal was described as a "circus shot" as Malík drew the puck towards the center of the net, put his stick between his legs, and shot high on Kölzig's stick side. With goaltenders Henrik Lundqvist and Kölzig dominant in net, the shootout went to 15 rounds. The teams had selected so many players to shoot that they were being forced to send out their weaker defencemen. Bryan Muir of the Caps scored in round 14, and Jason Strudwick answered for the Rangers to tie the score again. The next Caps shooter (Matt Bradley) was stopped by Lundqvist, which set the stage for Malík. He skated in on Kölzig, deked to his glove, pulled the puck back, put his stick through his legs, and flipped the puck in over Kölzig's blocker to score and win the game. He had not scored a goal during the season at the time. After the shot, he raised his arm and shrugged to the fans before being mobbed by his teammates. Former Rangers commentator John Davidson said, "Now I've seen it all! First Strudwick scores, then Malík wins a shootout with a shot between the legs. Oh Baby!" The goal was ranked as the play of the year by TSN's SportsCentre.

During his time with New York, Malík was criticized for his lack of physical play, despite his size, as well as his risky decision-making with the puck. These criticisms have been applied to Malík as early as his minor league days in Springfield.

On January 24, 2008, he was not at the game on Brian Leetch Night, even though it was team policy for players to be present at games. He also did not attend practice and his locker was empty for the game after he refused to shake hands with head coach Tom Renney after a victory in the Rangers' previous game.

On October 14, 2008, Malík signed a one-year contract with the Tampa Bay Lightning.

On November 23, 2009, Malik signed a one-year contract with the Genève-Servette HC from the Swiss National League A.

On May 7, 2014, Malik announced his retirement.

== Personal life ==
Malík has a wife and two sons. Malik's teammates and coaches called him "Harry", a nickname he received during his rookie season in Hartford because (at that time) he reminded them of the title character from Harry and the Hendersons.

== Career statistics ==
=== Regular season and playoffs ===
			Regular season					Playoffs
Season	Team	League	GP	G	A	Pts	PIM	GP	G	A	Pts	PIM
1992–93	TJ Vítkovice	TCH U20	29	5	19	24	16	—	—	—	—	—
1993–94	HC Vítkovice	ELH	39	3	4	7	65	2	0	0	0	2
1994–95	Hartford Whalers	NHL	1	0	1	1	0	—	—	—	—	—
1994–95	Springfield Falcons	AHL	58	11	30	41	91	—	—	—	—	—
1995–96	Hartford Whalers	NHL	7	0	0	0	4	—	—	—	—	—
1995–96	Springfield Falcons	AHL	68	8	14	22	135	8	1	3	4	20
1996–97	Hartford Whalers	NHL	47	1	5	6	50	—	—	—	—	—
1996–97	Springfield Falcons	AHL	3	0	3	3	4	—	—	—	—	—
1997–98	MIF Redhawks	SEL	37	1	5	6	68	—	—	—	—	—
1997–98	HC Vítkovice	ELH	1	0	0	0	0	—	—	—	—	—
1998–99	HC Vítkovice	ELH	1	1	0	1	6	—	—	—	—	—
1998–99	Carolina Hurricanes	NHL	52	2	9	11	36	4	0	0	0	4
1998–99	Beast of New Haven	AHL	21	2	8	10	28	—	—	—	—	—
1999–2000	Carolina Hurricanes	NHL	57	4	10	14	63	—	—	—	—	—
2000–01	Carolina Hurricanes	NHL	61	6	14	20	34	3	0	0	0	6
2001–02	Carolina Hurricanes	NHL	82	4	19	23	88	23	0	3	3	18
2002–03	Carolina Hurricanes	NHL	10	0	2	2	16	—	—	—	—	—
2002–03	Vancouver Canucks	NHL	69	7	11	18	52	14	1	1	2	10
2003–04	Vancouver Canucks	NHL	78	3	16	19	45	7	0	0	0	10
2004–05	HC Vítkovice	ELH	42	1	9	10	50	7	0	0	0	37
2005–06	New York Rangers	NHL	74	2	16	18	78	4	0	1	1	6
2006–07	New York Rangers	NHL	69	2	19	21	70	10	1	3	4	10
2007–08	New York Rangers	NHL	42	2	8	10	48	—	—	—	—	—
2008–09	Tampa Bay Lightning	NHL	42	0	5	5	36	—	—	—	—	—
2009–10	HC Vítkovice Steel	ELH	8	0	4	4	6	—	—	—	—	—
2009–10	Genève–Servette HC	NLA	25	0	4	4	10	20	2	8	10	14
2010–11	HC Vítkovice Steel	ELH	47	5	24	29	134	14	1	4	5	6
2011–12	HC Vítkovice Steel	ELH	48	2	14	16	155	—	—	—	—	—
2012–13	HC Vítkovice Steel	ELH	49	1	16	17	91	9	0	0	0	54
2013–14	HC TWK Innsbruck	AUT	47	4	14	18	48	—	—	—	—	—
ELH totals			235	13	71	84	505	32	1	4	5	99
NHL totals			691	33	135	168	620	65	2	8	10	64
AHL totals			150	21	55	76	258	8	1	3	4	20

=== International ===
Marek Malík
Medal record

Representing Czech Republic

Ice hockey

Olympic Games
Bronze medal – third place	2006 Turin	

Year	Team	Event	GP	G	A	Pts	PIM
1993	Czechoslovakia	EJC	2	0	2	2	0
1994	Czech Republic	WJC	7	2	4	6	20
1995	Czech Republic	WJC	7	2	5	7	12
2004	Czech Republic	WCH	4	0	0	0	4
2006	Czech Republic	OG	8	0	0	0	8
Junior totals			16	4	11	15	48
Senior totals			12	0	0	0	12

== Awards ==
- Awarded the Plus/Minus Award in 2004 (co-recipient with Martin St. Louis)
- Bronze medal with the Czech Republic at the 2006 Winter Olympics

Preceded by Peter Forsberg; Milan Hejduk	Co-winner of the NHL Plus/Minus Award; 2004; With: Martin St. Louis	Succeeded by Wade Redden; Michal Rozsíval
