= 2004 World Cup of Hockey statistics =

These are the individual player statistics for the 2004 World Cup of Hockey.

== Canada ==
Note: GP = Games Played, G = Goals, A = Assists, Pts = Points, PIM = Penalty Minutes

| Player-Position | Team | GP | G | A | Pts | PIM |
|---|---|---|---|---|---|---|
| Vincent Lecavalier-F | (Canada) | 6 | 2 | 5 | 7 | 8 |
| Joe Sakic-F | (Canada) | 6 | 4 | 2 | 6 | 2 |
| Joe Thornton-F | (Canada) | 6 | 1 | 5 | 6 | 0 |
| Mario Lemieux-F | (Canada) | 6 | 1 | 4 | 5 | 2 |
| Ryan Smyth-F | (Canada) | 6 | 3 | 1 | 4 | 2 |
| Kris Draper-F | (Canada) | 5 | 2 | 2 | 4 | 2 |
| Martin St. Louis-F | (Canada) | 6 | 2 | 2 | 4 | 0 |
| Eric Brewer-D | (Canada) | 6 | 1 | 3 | 4 | 4 |
| Brad Richards-F | (Canada) | 6 | 1 | 3 | 4 | 0 |
| Jarome Iginla-F | (Canada) | 6 | 2 | 1 | 3 | 2 |
| Adam Foote-D | (Canada) | 6 | 0 | 3 | 3 | 0 |
| Scott Niedermayer-D | (Canada) | 6 | 1 | 1 | 2 | 9 |
| Shane Doan-F | (Canada) | 6 | 1 | 1 | 2 | 2 |
| Simon Gagné-F | (Canada) | 6 | 1 | 1 | 2 | 0 |
| Dany Heatley-F | (Canada) | 6 | 0 | 2 | 2 | 2 |
| Wade Redden-D | (Canada) | 2 | 0 | 1 | 1 | 0 |
| Scott Hannan-D | (Canada) | 5 | 0 | 1 | 1 | 4 |
| Ed Jovanovski-D | (Canada) | 1 | 0 | 0 | 0 | 0 |
| Brenden Morrow-F | (Canada) | 1 | 0 | 0 | 0 | 4 |
| Jay Bouwmeester-D | (Canada) | 4 | 0 | 0 | 0 | 0 |
| Robyn Regehr-D | (Canada) | 6 | 0 | 0 | 0 | 6 |

== Czech Republic ==
Note: GP = Games Played, G = Goals, A = Assists, Pts = Points, PIM = Penalty Minutes

| Player | Team | GP | G | A | Pts | PIM |
|---|---|---|---|---|---|---|
| Martin Havlát-F | (Czech Republic) | 5 | 3 | 3 | 6 | 2 |
| Milan Hejduk-F | (Czech Republic) | 4 | 3 | 2 | 5 | 2 |
| Patrik Eliáš-F | (Czech Republic) | 5 | 3 | 2 | 5 | 10 |
| Marek Židlický-D | (Czech Republic) | 5 | 3 | 1 | 4 | 2 |
| Václav Prospal-F | (Czech Republic) | 4 | 1 | 3 | 4 | 0 |
| Petr Čajánek-F | (Czech Republic) | 4 | 1 | 2 | 3 | 0 |
| Martin Straka-F | (Czech Republic) | 5 | 1 | 2 | 3 | 0 |
| Martin Ručinský-F | (Czech Republic) | 4 | 1 | 1 | 2 | 10 |
| Jaromír Jágr-F | (Czech Republic) | 5 | 1 | 1 | 2 | 2 |
| Roman Hamrlík-D | (Czech Republic) | 4 | 0 | 2 | 2 | 0 |
| Jiří Šlégr-D | (Czech Republic) | 3 | 1 | 0 | 1 | 2 |
| Radek Dvořák-F | (Czech Republic) | 4 | 1 | 0 | 1 | 0 |
| Tomáš Vlasák-F | (Czech Republic) | 2 | 0 | 1 | 1 | 0 |
| Tomáš Kaberle-D | (Czech Republic) | 4 | 0 | 1 | 1 | 0 |
| Jiří Dopita-F | (Czech Republic) | 5 | 0 | 1 | 1 | 0 |
| Josef Vašíček-F | (Czech Republic) | 1 | 0 | 0 | 0 | 0 |
| Martin Škoula-D | (Czech Republic) | 2 | 0 | 0 | 0 | 2 |
| Robert Reichel-F | (Czech Republic) | 4 | 0 | 0 | 0 | 2 |
| Marek Malík-D | (Czech Republic) | 4 | 0 | 0 | 0 | 4 |
| Jiří Fischer-D | (Czech Republic) | 4 | 0 | 0 | 0 | 2 |
| Jaroslav Špaček-D | (Czech Republic) | 4 | 0 | 0 | 0 | 0 |
| David Výborný-F | (Czech Republic) | 5 | 0 | 0 | 0 | 2 |

== Germany ==
Note: GP = Games Played, G = Goals, A = Assists, Pts = Points, PIM = Penalty Minutes

| Player | Team | GP | G | A | Pts | PIM |
|---|---|---|---|---|---|---|
| Marco Sturm-F | (Germany) | 4 | 2 | 0 | 2 | 0 |
| Tino Boos-F | (Germany) | 4 | 1 | 1 | 2 | 2 |
| Daniel Kreutzer-F | (Germany) | 4 | 1 | 1 | 2 | 4 |
| Jochen Hecht-F | (Germany) | 4 | 1 | 0 | 1 | 2 |
| Marcel Goc-F | (Germany) | 3 | 0 | 1 | 1 | 2 |
| Rob Leask-D | (Germany) | 4 | 0 | 1 | 1 | 6 |
| Eduard Lewandowski-F | (Germany) | 4 | 0 | 1 | 1 | 4 |
| Martin Reichel-F | (Germany) | 2 | 0 | 0 | 0 | 0 |
| Christoph Schubert-D | (Germany) | 2 | 0 | 0 | 0 | 6 |
| Stephan Retzer-F | (Germany) | 2 | 0 | 0 | 0 | 0 |
| Sascha Goc-D | (Germany) | 3 | 0 | 0 | 0 | 2 |
| Lasse Kopitz-D | (Germany) | 3 | 0 | 0 | 0 | 4 |
| Andreas Renz-D | (Germany) | 3 | 0 | 0 | 0 | 2 |
| Klaus Kathan-F | (Germany) | 3 | 0 | 0 | 0 | 2 |
| Tomas Martinec-F | (Germany) | 3 | 0 | 0 | 0 | 2 |
| Stefan Ustorf-F | (Germany) | 4 | 0 | 0 | 0 | 0 |
| Christian Ehrhoff-D | (Germany) | 4 | 0 | 0 | 0 | 2 |
| Dennis Seidenberg-D | (Germany) | 4 | 0 | 0 | 0 | 0 |
| Mirko Ludemann-D | (Germany) | 4 | 0 | 0 | 0 | 0 |
| Tobias Abstreiter-F | (Germany) | 4 | 0 | 0 | 0 | 2 |
| Petr Fical-F | (Germany) | 4 | 0 | 0 | 0 | 0 |

== Finland ==
Note: GP = Games Played, G = Goals, A = Assists, Pts = Points, PIM = Penalty Minutes

| Player | Team | GP | G | A | Pts | PIM |
|---|---|---|---|---|---|---|
| Kimmo Timonen-D | (Finland) | 6 | 1 | 5 | 6 | 2 |
| Saku Koivu-F | (Finland) | 6 | 3 | 1 | 4 | 2 |
| Teemu Selänne-F | (Finland) | 6 | 1 | 3 | 4 | 4 |
| Jere Lehtinen-F | (Finland) | 6 | 1 | 3 | 4 | 2 |
| Olli Jokinen-F | (Finland) | 6 | 2 | 1 | 3 | 6 |
| Ossi Väänänen-D | (Finland) | 4 | 1 | 2 | 3 | 0 |
| Ville Peltonen-F | (Finland) | 6 | 1 | 2 | 3 | 2 |
| Niko Kapanen-F | (Finland) | 6 | 1 | 2 | 3 | 0 |
| Tuomo Ruutu-F | (Finland) | 6 | 1 | 2 | 3 | 4 |
| Toni Lydman-D | (Finland) | 6 | 0 | 3 | 3 | 6 |
| Mikko Eloranta-F | (Finland) | 6 | 2 | 0 | 2 | 2 |
| Jukka Hentunen-F | (Finland) | 6 | 1 | 1 | 2 | 2 |
| Teppo Numminen-D | (Finland) | 6 | 0 | 2 | 2 | 2 |
| Riku Hahl-F | (Finland) | 2 | 1 | 0 | 1 | 0 |
| Niklas Hagman-F | (Finland) | 5 | 1 | 0 | 1 | 2 |
| Mikko Koivu-F | (Finland) | 4 | 0 | 1 | 1 | 2 |
| Aki Berg-D | (Finland) | 5 | 0 | 1 | 1 | 2 |
| Sami Salo-D | (Finland) | 6 | 0 | 1 | 1 | 2 |
| Antti Laaksonen-F | (Finland) | 1 | 0 | 0 | 0 | 0 |
| Ville Nieminen-F | (Finland) | 2 | 0 | 0 | 0 | 0 |
| Janne Niinimaa-D | (Finland) | 3 | 0 | 0 | 0 | 0 |
| Jarkko Ruutu-F | (Finland) | 4 | 0 | 0 | 0 | 6 |

== Russia ==
Note: GP = Games Played, G = Goals, A = Assists, Pts = Points, PIM = Penalty Minutes

| Player | Team | GP | G | A | Pts | PIM |
|---|---|---|---|---|---|---|
| Alexei Kovalev-F | (Russia) | 4 | 2 | 1 | 3 | 4 |
| Dainius Zubrus-F | (Russia) | 4 | 2 | 1 | 3 | 4 |
| Alexei Yashin-F | (Russia) | 4 | 1 | 2 | 3 | 4 |
| Sergei Gonchar-D | (Russia) | 4 | 1 | 2 | 3 | 6 |
| Sergei Samsonov-F | (Russia) | 4 | 1 | 2 | 3 | 0 |
| Dmitry Afanasenkov-F | (Russia) | 2 | 1 | 1 | 2 | 0 |
| Alexander Frolov-F | (Russia) | 4 | 0 | 2 | 2 | 2 |
| Alexander Ovechkin-F | (Russia) | 2 | 1 | 0 | 1 | 0 |
| Viktor Kozlov-F | (Russia) | 4 | 1 | 0 | 1 | 0 |
| Pavel Datsyuk-F | (Russia) | 4 | 1 | 0 | 1 | 0 |
| Ilya Kovalchuk-F | (Russia) | 4 | 1 | 0 | 1 | 4 |
| Oleg Kvasha-F | (Russia) | 2 | 0 | 1 | 1 | 0 |
| Andrei Markov-D | (Russia) | 2 | 0 | 1 | 1 | 2 |
| Darius Kasparaitis-D | (Russia) | 4 | 0 | 1 | 1 | 8 |
| Maxim Afinogenov-F | (Russia) | 4 | 0 | 1 | 1 | 2 |
| Artem Chubarov-F | (Russia) | 4 | 0 | 1 | 1 | 0 |
| Alexander Khavanov-D | (Russia) | 4 | 0 | 1 | 1 | 4 |
| Anton Volchenkov-D | (Russia) | 1 | 0 | 0 | 0 | 0 |
| Andrei Kovalenko-F | (Russia) | 2 | 0 | 0 | 0 | 6 |
| Oleg Tverdovsky-D | (Russia) | 3 | 0 | 0 | 0 | 0 |
| Vitaly Vishnevskiy-D | (Russia) | 3 | 0 | 0 | 0 | 0 |
| Dmitri Kalinin-D | (Russia) | 3 | 0 | 0 | 0 | 0 |

== Slovakia ==
Note: GP = Games Played, G = Goals, A = Assists, Pts = Points, PIM = Penalty Minutes

| Player | Team | GP | G | A | Pts | PIM |
|---|---|---|---|---|---|---|
| Pavol Demitra-F | (Slovakia) | 4 | 0 | 2 | 2 | 2 |
| Zdeno Chára-D | (Slovakia) | 4 | 0 | 2 | 2 | 8 |
| Marián Hossa-F | (Slovakia) | 4 | 1 | 0 | 1 | 2 |
| Ladislav Nagy-F | (Slovakia) | 4 | 1 | 0 | 1 | 0 |
| Martin Cibák-F | (Slovakia) | 4 | 1 | 0 | 1 | 0 |
| Marián Gáborík-F | (Slovakia) | 4 | 1 | 0 | 1 | 2 |
| Ľuboš Bartečko-F | (Slovakia) | 4 | 0 | 1 | 1 | 2 |
| Branko Radivojevič-F | (Slovakia) | 4 | 0 | 1 | 1 | 2 |
| Radovan Somík-F | (Slovakia) | 1 | 0 | 0 | 0 | 0 |
| Ladislav Čierny-D | (Slovakia) | 1 | 0 | 0 | 0 | 0 |
| Rastislav Pavlikovský-F | (Slovakia) | 2 | 0 | 0 | 0 | 2 |
| Branislav Mezei-D | (Slovakia) | 2 | 0 | 0 | 0 | 0 |
| Miroslav Hlinka-F | (Slovakia) | 2 | 0 | 0 | 0 | 2 |
| Richard Zedník-F | (Slovakia) | 3 | 0 | 0 | 0 | 0 |
| Jaroslav Obšut-D | (Slovakia) | 3 | 0 | 0 | 0 | 0 |
| Richard Lintner-D | (Slovakia) | 3 | 0 | 0 | 0 | 0 |
| Radoslav Suchý-D | (Slovakia) | 3 | 0 | 0 | 0 | 0 |
| Jozef Stümpel-F | (Slovakia) | 4 | 0 | 0 | 0 | 2 |
| Miroslav Šatan-F | (Slovakia) | 4 | 0 | 0 | 0 | 4 |
| Martin Štrbák-D | (Slovakia) | 4 | 0 | 0 | 0 | 4 |
| Vladimír Országh-F | (Slovakia) | 4 | 0 | 0 | 0 | 6 |
| Ľubomír Višňovský-D | (Slovakia) | 4 | 0 | 0 | 0 | 6 |

== Sweden ==
Note: GP = Games Played, G = Goals, A = Assists, Pts = Points, PIM = Penalty Minutes

| Player | Team | GP | G | A | Pts | PIM |
|---|---|---|---|---|---|---|
| Fredrik Modin-F | (Sweden) | 4 | 4 | 4 | 8 | 2 |
| Daniel Alfredsson-F | (Sweden) | 4 | 0 | 6 | 6 | 2 |
| Tomas Holmström-F | (Sweden) | 4 | 3 | 2 | 5 | 8 |
| Mats Sundin-F | (Sweden) | 4 | 1 | 4 | 5 | 0 |
| Kim Johnsson-D | (Sweden) | 4 | 1 | 3 | 4 | 0 |
| Peter Forsberg-F | (Sweden) | 4 | 1 | 2 | 3 | 0 |
| Markus Näslund-F | (Sweden) | 4 | 0 | 3 | 3 | 0 |
| Henrik Zetterberg-F | (Sweden) | 4 | 1 | 1 | 2 | 4 |
| Nicklas Lidström-D | (Sweden) | 4 | 1 | 0 | 1 | 2 |
| Mattias Öhlund-D | (Sweden) | 4 | 1 | 0 | 1 | 0 |
| Marcus Nilson-F | (Sweden) | 4 | 1 | 0 | 1 | 4 |
| Dick Tärnström-D | (Sweden) | 2 | 0 | 0 | 0 | 0 |
| Marcus Ragnarsson-D | (Sweden) | 3 | 0 | 0 | 0 | 0 |
| Daniel Tjärnqvist-D | (Sweden) | 3 | 0 | 0 | 0 | 2 |
| Andreas Johansson-F | (Sweden) | 4 | 0 | 0 | 0 | 4 |
| Mattias Norström-D | (Sweden) | 4 | 0 | 0 | 0 | 0 |
| Jörgen Jönsson-F | (Sweden) | 4 | 0 | 0 | 0 | 0 |
| P. J. Axelsson-F | (Sweden) | 4 | 0 | 0 | 0 | 2 |
| Samuel Påhlsson-F | (Sweden) | 4 | 0 | 0 | 0 | 6 |

== United States ==
Note: GP = Games Played, G = Goals, A = Assists, Pts = Points, PIM = Penalty Minutes

| Player | Team | GP | G | A | Pts | PIM |
|---|---|---|---|---|---|---|
| Keith Tkachuk-F | (United States) | 5 | 5 | 1 | 6 | 23 |
| Mike Modano-F | (United States) | 5 | 0 | 6 | 6 | 0 |
| Bill Guerin-F | (United States) | 5 | 2 | 2 | 4 | 8 |
| Scott Gomez-F | (United States) | 5 | 1 | 3 | 4 | 0 |
| Brian Rafalski-D | (United States) | 4 | 0 | 3 | 3 | 6 |
| Bryan Smolinski-F | (United States) | 3 | 1 | 0 | 1 | 0 |
| Jason Blake-F | (United States) | 4 | 1 | 0 | 1 | 2 |
| Doug Weight-F | (United States) | 5 | 1 | 0 | 1 | 4 |
| Paul Martin-D | (United States) | 3 | 0 | 1 | 1 | 0 |
| Chris Chelios-D | (United States) | 5 | 0 | 1 | 1 | 6 |
| Brian Leetch-D | (United States) | 5 | 0 | 1 | 1 | 6 |
| Tony Amonte-F | (United States) | 5 | 0 | 1 | 1 | 0 |
| Brett Hull-F | (United States) | 2 | 0 | 0 | 0 | 2 |
| Eric Weinrich-D | (United States) | 2 | 0 | 0 | 0 | 0 |
| Craig Conroy-F | (United States) | 2 | 0 | 0 | 0 | 0 |
| Brian Rolston-F | (United States) | 2 | 0 | 0 | 0 | 0 |
| John-Michael Liles-D | (United States) | 2 | 0 | 0 | 0 | 0 |
| Jamie Langenbrunner-F | (United States) | 3 | 0 | 0 | 0 | 4 |
| Ken Klee-D | (United States) | 4 | 0 | 0 | 0 | 0 |
| Jeff Halpern-F | (United States) | 4 | 0 | 0 | 0 | 7 |
| Aaron Miller-D | (United States) | 5 | 0 | 0 | 0 | 4 |
| Steve Konowalchuk-F | (United States) | 5 | 0 | 0 | 0 | 4 |
| Chris Drury-F | (United States) | 5 | 0 | 0 | 0 | 0 |

== Goalies ==
Note: W = Wins, L = Losses, T = Ties, GAA = Goals Against Average, SPCT = Save Percentage

| Player | Team | W | L | T | GAA | SPCT |
|---|---|---|---|---|---|---|
| Martin Brodeur | (Canada) | 5 | 0 | 0 | 1.00 | .961 |
| Roberto Luongo | (Canada) | 1 | 0 | 0 | 2.82 | .925 |
| Tomáš Vokoun | (Czech Republic) | 2 | 3 | 0 | 2.98 | .881 |
| Olaf Kölzig | (Germany) | 0 | 4 | 0 | 3.34 | .905 |
| Robert Müller | (Germany) | 0 | 0 | 0 | 5.94 | .885 |
| Oliver Jonas | (Germany) | 0 | 0 | 0 | 8.08 | .867 |
| Miikka Kiprusoff | (Finland) | 4 | 1 | 1 | 1.48 | .940 |
| Ilya Bryzgalov | (Russia) | 2 | 1 | 0 | 2.34 | .897 |
| Maxim Sokolov | (Russia) | 0 | 1 | 0 | 3.01 | .893 |
| Rastislav Staňa | (Slovakia) | 0 | 1 | 0 | 4.08 | .860 |
| Ján Lašák | (Slovakia) | 0 | 3 | 0 | 4.75 | .833 |
| Tommy Salo | (Sweden) | 1 | 0 | 0 | 2.00 | .895 |
| Mikael Tellqvist | (Sweden) | 1 | 1 | 1 | 4.03 | .875 |
| Robert Esche | (United States) | 1 | 3 | 0 | 2.53 | .909 |
| Rick DiPietro | (United States) | 1 | 0 | 0 | 1.00 | .941 |
