= 2004 World Cup of Hockey =

2004 edition of the World Cup of Hockey

Tournament details
- Host countries: Canada; United States; Finland; Sweden; Czech Republic; Germany
- Venues: 7 (in 7 host cities)
- Dates: August 30 – September 14, 2004
- Teams: 8

Final positions
- Champions: Canada (1st title)

Tournament statistics
- Games played: 19
- Goals scored: 104 (5.47 per game)
- Attendance: 303,630 (15,981 per game)
- Scoring leader: (Sweden) Fredrik Modin (8 pts)

Awards
- MVP: (Canada) Vincent Lecavalier

The 2004 World Cup of Hockey (Note: German: Eishockey-Weltpokal 2004, French: Coupe du monde de hockey sur glace 2004, Czech: Světový pohár v ledním hokeji 2004, Swedish: Världscupen i ishockey 2004, Finnish: Jääkiekon maailmancup 2004) was an international ice hockey tournament. It was the second installment of the National Hockey League (NHL)-sanctioned competition, eight years after the inaugural 1996 World Cup of Hockey. It was held from August 30 to September 14, 2004, and took place in various venues in North America and Europe. Canada won the championship, defeating Finland in the final, held in Toronto.

The tournament directly preceded the NHL lockout, as the NHL announced they were locking out players during 2004–05 season two days after the tournament final was played, pending the adoption of a new Collective Bargaining Agreement.

== Team participants ==
North American pool	European pool
Canada (roster, statistics)	Czech Republic (roster, statistics)
Russia (roster, statistics)	Finland (roster, statistics)
Slovakia (roster, statistics)	Germany (roster, statistics)
United States (roster, statistics)	Sweden (roster, statistics)

== Venues ==
North American pool and quarterfinals, semifinals and final

- Air Canada Centre – Toronto, Ontario, Canada
- Bell Centre – Montreal, Quebec, Canada
- Xcel Energy Center – St. Paul, Minnesota, U.S.

European pool and quarterfinals

- Globen – Stockholm, Sweden
- Hartwall Areena – Helsinki, Finland
- Kölnarena – Cologne, Germany
- Sazka Arena – Prague, Czech Republic

== Pre-tournament games ==
- Russia–Germany 3–3 (Cologne)
- Sweden–Slovakia 2–0 (Bratislava)
- Finland–Czech Republic 1–1 (Prague)
- Canada–United States 1–3 (Columbus)
- Finland–Sweden 1–2 OT (Stockholm)
- Czech Republic–Germany 7–4 (Cologne)
- United States–Canada 1–3 (Ottawa)
- Germany–Finland 2–4 (Helsinki)
- Sweden–Czech Republic 3–5 (Prague)
- Russia–United States 0–2 (Columbus)
- Slovakia–Canada 2–2 (Ottawa)
- Slovakia–Russia 0–0 (Ottawa)

== Preliminary round ==
=== North American pool ===
Team	Pld	W	L	D	GF	GA	GD	Pts
Canada (H)	3	3	0	0	10	3	+7	6
Russia	3	2	1	0	9	6	+3	4
United States (H)	3	1	2	0	5	6	−1	2
Slovakia	3	0	3	0	4	13	−9	0

(H) Hosts

All times are local (UTC-5 / UTC-4).

31 August 2004; 19:00	United States	1–2 (0–1, 1–1, 0–0)	Canada	Bell Centre, Montreal; Attendance: 21,273

Game reference

Robert Esche
Goalies
Martin Brodeur
Referees:
Paul Devorski
Brad Watson
Linesmen:
Brian Murphy
Tim Nowak

	0–1	16:01 – M. St. Louis (J. Thornton, S. Niedermayer) (PP)
	0–2	23:05 – J. Sakic (W. Redden, M. St. Louis) (PP)
B. Guerin (S. Gomez) – 30:40	1–2

21 min
Penalties
19 min
24
Shots
32

1 September 2004; 19:00	Canada	5–1 (2–0, 1–0, 2–1)	Slovakia	Bell Centre, Montreal; Attendance: 21,273

Game reference

Martin Brodeur
Goalies
Rastislav Staňa
Referees:
Don Van Massenhoven
Stephen Walkom
Linesmen:
Jean Morin
Pierre Racicot

J. Thornton – 3:02	1–0
R. Smyth (A. Foote, V. Lecavalier) – 4:43	2–0
S. Gagné (M. St. Louis) – 24:07	3–0
M. St. Louis (B. Richards, A. Foote) (PP) – 40:58	4–0
	4–1	44:53 – M. Cibák (Ľ. Bartečko, B. Radivojevič)
R. Smyth (V. Lecavalier, D. Heatley) – 47:11	5–1

8 min
Penalties
12 min
35
Shots
25

2 September 2004; 19:00	Russia	3–1 (0–0, 1–1, 2–0)	United States	Xcel Energy Center, St. Paul; Attendance: 18,064

Game reference

Ilya Bryzgalov
Goalies
Robert Esche
Referees:
Paul Devorski
Brad Watson
Linesmen:
Brian Murphy
Tim Nowak

D. Zubrus (O. Kvasha, A. Yashin) – 32:20	1–0
	1–1	33:44 – K. Tkachuk (M. Modano, B. Rafalski) (PP)
A. Kovalev (A. Khavanov) – 45:05	2–1
V. Kozlov (S. Samsonov) – 58:02	3–1

41 min
Penalties
17 min
45
Shots
21

3 September 2004; 19:00	Slovakia	1–3 (1–2, 0–0, 0–1)	United States	Xcel Energy Center, St. Paul; Attendance: 17,104

Game reference

Ján Lašák
Goalies
Rick DiPietro
Referees:
Don Van Massenhoven
Stephen Walkom
Linesmen:
Jean Morin
Pierre Racicot

	0–1	3:09 – B. Smolinski (B. Leetch, T. Amonte) (PP)
L. Nagy (P. Demitra, Z. Chára) (PP) – 11:14	1–1
	1–2	13:27 – J. Blake (C. Chelios, S. Gomez)
	1–3	56:17 – B. Guerin (M. Modano)

12 min
Penalties
12 min
17
Shots
39

4 September 2004; 19:00	Russia	1–3 (0–0, 0–2, 1–1)	Canada	Air Canada Centre, Toronto; Attendance: 19,226

Game reference

Maxim Sokolov
Goalies
Martin Brodeur
Referees:
Paul Devorski
Brad Watson
Linesmen:
Brian Murphy
Tim Nowak

	0–1	23:40 – B. Richards (S. Gagné, S. Hannan) (SH)
	0–2	25:17 – K. Draper (S. Doan, V. Lecavalier)
	0–3	45:43 – J. Sakic (M. Lemieux)
S. Gonchar (M. Afinogenov) – 52:46	1–3

12 min
Penalties
12 min
28
Shots
28

5 September 2004; 19:00	Slovakia	2–5 (1–1, 0–2, 1–2)	Russia	Air Canada Centre, Toronto; Attendance: 18,115

Game reference

Ján Lašák
Goalies
Ilya Bryzgalov
Referees:
Don Van Massenhoven
Stephen Walkom
Linesmen:
Jean Morin
Pierre Racicot

	0–1	8:10 – P. Datsyuk (A. Markov, A. Frolov)
M. Hossa (P. Demitra, Z. Chára) – 10:27	1–1
	1–2	32:01 – A. Kovalev
	1–3	35:47 – S. Samsonov (D. Zubrus, S. Gonchar)
	1–4	40:59 – A. Yashin (A. Frolov) (SH)
M. Gáborík – 45:47	2–4
	2–5	47:10 – A. Ovechkin (D. Afanasenkov)

14 min
Penalties
12 min
27
Shots
15

=== European pool ===
Team	Pld	W	L	D	GF	GA	GD	Pts
Finland	3	2	0	1	11	4	+7	5
Sweden	3	2	0	1	13	9	+4	5
Czech Republic	3	1	2	0	10	10	0	2
Germany	3	0	3	0	4	15	−11	0

All times are local (UTC+2 / UTC+3).

30 August 2004; 20:00	Czech Republic	0–4 (0–1, 0–0, 0–3)	Finland	Hartwall Areena, Helsinki; Attendance: 11,407

Game reference

Tomáš Vokoun
Goalies
Miikka Kiprusoff
Referees:
Marc Joannette
Don Koharski
Linesmen:
Greg Devorski
Brad Lazarowich

0–1	6:33 – J. Hentunen (N. Kapanen, T. Numminen)
0–2	40:30 – S. Koivu (J. Lehtinen)
0–3	44:54 – N. Kapanen (S. Salo, V. Peltonen) (PP)
0–4	48:51 – M. Eloranta (K. Timonen, M. Koivu)

14 min
Penalties
4 min
12
Shots
34

31 August 2004; 19:00	Germany	2–5 (1–1, 1–4, 0–0)	Sweden	Globen, Stockholm; Attendance: 12,133

Game reference

Olaf Kölzig
Goalies
Tommy Salo
Referees:
Dan Marouelli
Kevin Pollock
Linesmen:
Derek Amell
Brad Kovachik

	0–1	16:34 – T. Holmström (M. Näslund, P. Forsberg) (PP)
M. Sturm (SH) – 17:53	1–1
	1–2	21:59 – M. Sundin (D. Alfredsson, F. Modin)
	1–3	27:26 – K. Johnsson (D. Alfredsson, F. Modin) (PP)
	1–4	31:51 – M. Nilson (M. Sundin, T. Holmström)
D. Kreutzer (T. Boos) (SH) – 33:00	2–4
	2–5	36:25 – F. Modin (K. Johnsson, M. Sundin)

14 min
Penalties
8 min
19
Shots
42

1 September 2004; 19:00	Czech Republic	3–4 (0–1, 0–3, 3–0)	Sweden	Globen, Stockholm; Attendance: 13,850

Game reference

Tomáš Vokoun
Goalies
Mikael Tellqvist
Referees:
Dan Marouelli
Kevin Pollock
Linesmen:
Derek Amell
Brad Kovachik

	0–1	11:49 – F. Modin (M. Sundin)
	0–2	22:58 – P. Forsberg (T. Holmström, M. Näslund) (PP)
	0–3	24:28 – M. Öhlund (D. Alfredsson, F. Modin) (PP)
	0–4	30:30 – H. Zetterberg (K. Johnsson) (PP)
M. Ručinský (M. Havlát) – 43:12	1–4
M. Židlický – 45:16	2–4
P. Eliáš (R. Hamrlík) – 54:25	3–4

16 min
Penalties
16 min
40
Shots
20

2 September 2004; 19:30	Finland	3–0 (1–0, 1–0, 1–0)	Germany	Kölnarena, Cologne; Attendance: 12,975

Game reference

Miikka Kiprusoff
Goalies
Olaf Kölzig
Referees:
Marc Joannette
Don Koharski
Linesmen:
Greg Devorski
Brad Lazarowich

K. Timonen (J. Lehtinen, T. Selänne) (PP) – 10:47	1–0
T. Selänne (K. Timonen, S. Koivu) (PP) – 31:27	2–0
J. Lehtinen (K. Timonen) – 55:38	3–0

14 min
Penalties
10 min
39
Shots
29

3 September 2004; 19:00	Germany	2–7 (0–0, 0–5, 2–2)	Czech Republic	Sazka Arena, Prague; Attendance: 11,944

Game reference

Robert Müller (out 30:17)
Oliver Jonas (in 30:17)
Goalies
Tomáš Vokoun
Referees:
Marc Joannette
Don Koharski
Linesmen:
Greg Devorski
Brad Lazarowich

	0–1	22:56 – M. Židlický (M. Straka, V. Prospal) (PP)
	0–2	24:27 – J. Šlégr (J. Dopita, P. Sýkora)
	0–3	25:52 – J. Jágr (V. Prospal)
	0–4	30:50 – M. Hejduk (P. Eliáš) (PP)
	0–5	35:48 – P. Eliáš (M. Havlát)
T. Boos (E. Lewandowski) – 43:55	1–5
	1–6	50:59 – M. Havlát (T. Vlasák, R. Hamrlík)
J. Hecht (R. Leask) – 57:19	2–6
	2–7	58:36 – V. Prospal (J. Jágr)

10 min
Penalties
8 min
30
Shots
56

4 September 2004; 20:00	Sweden	4–4 (OT) (3–3, 0–1, 1–0, 0–0)	Finland	Hartwall Areena, Helsinki; Attendance: 12,948

Game reference

Mikael Tellqvist
Goalies
Miikka Kiprusoff
Referees:
Dan Marouelli
Kevin Pollock
Linesmen:
Derek Amell
Brad Kovachik

	0–1	1:39 – V. Peltonen (T. Ruutu, O. Väänänen)
	0–2	4:34 – O. Väänänen (T. Lydman, J. Hentunen) (PP)
F. Modin (H. Zetterberg, D. Alfredsson) (PP) – 12:27	1–2
	1–3	12:46 – S. Koivu (J. Lehtinen, T. Selänne)
N. Lidström (D. Alfredsson, M. Sundin) (PP) – 17:24	2–3
F. Modin (K. Johnsson, D. Alfredsson) – 19:17	3–3
	3–4	20:38 – O. Jokinen (T. Ruutu, V. Peltonen)
T. Holmström (P. Forsberg, F. Modin) (PP) – 59:49	4–4

10 min
Penalties
16 min
30
Shots
25

== Playoff round ==
=== Bracket ===
Quarterfinals
E1	Finland	2
E4	Germany	1
NA3	United States	5
NA2	Russia	3
NA1	Canada	5
NA4	Slovakia	0
E3	Czech Republic	6
E2	Sweden	1

Semifinals
E1	Finland	2
NA3	United States	1
NA1	Canada	4
E3	Czech Republic	3

Final
E1	Finland	2
NA1	Canada	3

=== Quarter-finals ===
All times are local (UTC+3 / UTC+2 / UTC-5 / UTC-4).

6 September 2004; 20:00	Germany	1–2 (0–0, 0–1, 1–1)	Finland	Hartwall Areena, Helsinki; Attendance: 8,650

Olaf Kölzig
Goalies
Miikka Kiprusoff
Referees:
Dan Marouelli
Kevin Pollock
Linesmen:
Derek Amell
Brad Kovachik

	0–1	30:50 – N. Hagman (N. Kapanen, K. Timonen) (PP)
M. Sturm (M. Goc, D. Kreutzer) – 53:58	1–1
	1–2	56:38 – M. Eloranta (K. Timonen, O. Jokinen)

8 min
Penalties
4 min
28
Shots
24

7 September 2004; 19:00	Czech Republic	6–1 (2–0, 1–0, 3–1)	Sweden	Globen, Stockholm; Attendance: 11,957

Game reference

Tomáš Vokoun
Goalies
Mikael Tellqvist
Referees:
Marc Joannette
Don Koharski
Linesmen:
Greg Devorski
Brad Lazarowich

M. Straka (V. Prospal) – 6:15	1–0
M. Havlát (P. Eliáš) – 13:30	2–0
M. Židlický (M. Straka) – 36:08	3–0
R. Dvořák (P. Čajánek) (SH) – 48:17	4–0
M. Hejduk (M. Židlický) – 54:37	5–0
	5–1	56:29 – T. Holmström (M. Näslund, P. Forsberg) (PP)
M. Hejduk (P. Čajánek) (EN) – 58:15	6–1

4 min
Penalties
8 min
32
Shots
18

7 September 2004; 18:00	United States	5–3 (1–0, 1–1, 3–2)	Russia	Xcel Energy Center, St. Paul; Attendance: 17,218

Game reference

Robert Esche
Goalies
Ilya Bryzgalov
Referees:
Paul Devorski
Brad Watson
Linesmen:
Brian Murphy
Tim Nowak

K. Tkachuk (M. Modano, B. Rafalski) – 11:20	1–0
K. Tkachuk (B. Guerin, M. Modano) – 21:56	2–0
	2–1	27:14 – D. Afanasenkov (A. Chubarov, S. Gonchar)
	2–2	40:36 – D. Zubrus (A. Yashin, D. Kasparaitis)
S. Gomez (K. Tkachuk) – 44:25	3–2
K. Tkachuk (B. Guerin, M. Modano) – 44:47	4–2
	4–3	51:04 – I. Kovalchuk (S. Samsonov, A. Kovalev) (PP)
K. Tkachuk (M. Modano, B. Rafalski) (EN) – 59:05	5–3

10 min
Penalties
6 min
21
Shots
21

8 September 2004; 19:00	Slovakia	0–5 (0–0, 0–4, 0–1)	Canada	Air Canada Centre, Toronto; Attendance: 18,786

Game reference

Ján Lašák (out 31:48)
Rastislav Staňa (in 31:48)
Goalies
Martin Brodeur
Referees:
Don Van Massenhoven
Stephen Walkom
Linesmen:
Jean Morin
Pierre Racicot

0–1	22:28 – V. Lecavalier (B. Richards, E. Brewer) (PP)
0–2	25:26 – J. Iginla (J. Sakic, E. Brewer)
0–3	31:29 – R. Smyth (V. Lecavalier, D. Heatley)
0–4	31:48 – J. Sakic (J. Iginla, M. Lemieux)
0–5	47:49 – J. Iginla (M. Lemieux, J. Sakic)

8 min
Penalties
8 min
23
Shots
26

=== Semi-finals ===
All times are local (UTC-5 / UTC-4).

10 September 2004; 18:00	United States	1–2 (0–0, 1–0, 0–2)	Finland	Xcel Energy Center, St. Paul; Attendance: 18,064

Game reference

Robert Esche
Goalies
Miikka Kiprusoff
Referees:
Marc Joannette
Don Koharski
Linesmen:
Greg Devorski
Brad Lazarowich

D. Weight (S. Gomez, P. Martin) (PP) – 32:57	1–0
	1–1	45:04 – O. Jokinen (T. Numminen)
	1–2	56:06 – S. Koivu (O. Väänänen, T. Selänne)

8 min
Penalties
8 min
17
Shots
12

11 September 2004; 18:30	Czech Republic	3–4 (OT) (0–0, 1–2, 2–1, 0–1)	Canada	Air Canada Centre, Toronto; Attendance: 19,273

Game reference

Tomáš Vokoun
Goalies
Roberto Luongo
Referees:
Paul Devorski
Stephen Walkom
Linesmen:
Jean Morin
Pierre Racicot

	0–1	31:15 – E. Brewer (K. Draper, J. Thornton)
	0–2	34:25 – M. Lemieux (V. Lecavalier, B. Richards) (PP)
P. Čajánek (M. Hejduk, M. Ručinský) – 35:07	1–2
M. Havlát (T. Kaberle, M. Hejduk) (PP) – 47:21	2–2
	2–3	53:47 – K. Draper (J. Thornton)
P. Eliáš (M. Havlát) – 53:53	3–3
	3–4	63:45 – V. Lecavalier (R. Smyth)

2 min
Penalties
2 min
40
Shots
24

=== Final ===
Time is Eastern Daylight-Saving Time (UTC-4).

14 September 2004; 19:00	Finland	2–3 (1–1, 1–1, 0–1)	Canada	Air Canada Centre, Toronto; Attendance: 19,370

Game reference

Miikka Kiprusoff
Goalies
Martin Brodeur
Referees:
Paul Devorski
Stephen Walkom
Linesmen:
Greg Devorski
Brad Lazarowich

	0–1	0:52 – J. Sakic (M. Lemieux, E. Brewer)
R. Hahl (T. Lydman, A. Berg) – 6:34	1–1
	1–2	23:15 – S. Niedermayer (K. Draper, J. Thornton)
T. Ruutu (T. Lydman) – 39:00	2–2
	2–3	40:34 – S. Doan (J. Thornton, A. Foote)

2 min
Penalties
2 min
29
Shots
33

== Ranking and statistics ==
2004 World Cup of Hockey winners

Canada
1st title

=== Tournament awards ===
- Tournament MVP
  - (Canada) Vincent Lecavalier
- All-star team
  - Goaltender: (Canada) Martin Brodeur
  - Defence: (Canada) Adam Foote, (Finland) Kimmo Timonen
  - Forwards: (Canada) Vincent Lecavalier, (Finland) Saku Koivu, (Sweden) Fredrik Modin

=== Final standings ===
1	Canada
2	Finland
3	Czech Republic
4	United States
5	Sweden
6	Russia
7	Slovakia
8	Germany

=== Scoring leaders ===
Player	GP	G	A	Pts	PIM
(Sweden) Fredrik Modin	4	4	4	8	2
(Canada) Vincent Lecavalier	6	2	5	7	8
(United States) Keith Tkachuk	5	5	1	6	23
(Czech Republic) Martin Havlat	5	3	3	6	2
(Canada) Joe Sakic	6	3	3	6	2
(Finland) Kimmo Timonen	6	1	5	6	2
(United States) Mike Modano	5	0	6	6	0
(Sweden) Daniel Alfredsson	4	0	6	6	2
(Czech Republic) Milan Hejduk	5	3	2	5	2
(Czech Republic) Patrik Elias	5	3	2	5	10

=== Leading goaltenders ===
Player	MIP	GA	GAA	SVS%
(Canada) Martin Brodeur	300	5	1.00	0.961
(United States) Rick DiPietro	60	1	1.00	0.941
(Finland) Miikka Kiprusoff	365	9	1.50	0.939
(Sweden) Tommy Salo	60	2	2.00	0.895
(Russia) Ilya Bryzgalov	180	7	2.34	0.897
(United States) Robert Esche	238	10	2.53	0.909
(Canada) Roberto Luongo	64	3	2.82	0.925
(Czech Republic) Tomas Vokoun	302	15	2.98	0.881
(Russia) Maxim Sokolov	60	3	3.01	0.893
(Germany) Olaf Kolzig	180	10	3.34	0.905

== See also ==
- International Ice Hockey Federation
- National Hockey League
- Summit Series
- World Cup of Hockey
- World Professional Hockey Championships
- 1996 World Cup of Hockey
- 2004 World Cup of Hockey statistics
