= Napgate =

Napgate may refer to:

- Ken Griffey Jr.'s sleeping in the Seattle Mariners' clubhouse in 2010.
- Ilya Bryzgalov allegedly sleeping in a Philadelphia Flyers' team meeting in 2013.
