= Pavol Demitra =

Slovak ice hockey player (1974–2011)

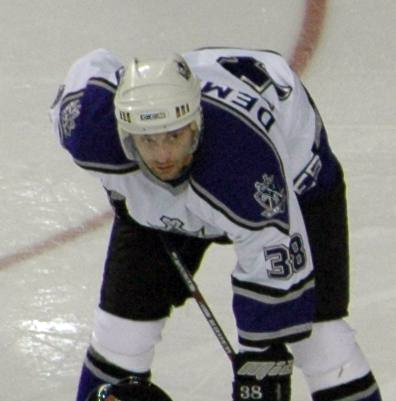
- Demitra with the Los Angeles Kings in December 2005
- Born: 29 November 1974 Dubnica nad Váhom, Czechoslovakia
- Died: 7 September 2011 (aged 36) Yaroslavl, Russia
- Height: 6 ft 0 in (183 cm)
- Weight: 200 lb (91 kg; 14 st 4 lb)
- Position: Center
- Shot: Left
- Played for: HC Dukla Trenčín; Ottawa Senators; St. Louis Blues; Los Angeles Kings; Minnesota Wild; Vancouver Canucks; Lokomotiv Yaroslavl
- National team: Slovakia
- NHL draft: 227th overall, 1993; Ottawa Senators
- Playing career: 1992–2011
Medal record
Men's ice hockey
Representing Slovakia
World Championships
Bronze medal – third place	2003 Finland
Representing Czechoslovakia
World Junior Championships
Bronze medal – third place	1993 Sweden

Pavol Demitra (Slovak pronunciation: [ˈpaʋɔl ˈdemitra]; 29 November 1974 – 7 September 2011) was a Slovak professional ice hockey player. He played nineteen seasons of professional hockey, for teams in the Czechoslovak First Ice Hockey League (CSL), National Hockey League (NHL), Slovak Extraliga (SVK), and Kontinental Hockey League (KHL). A skilled offensive player, Demitra was a top-line forward throughout his career.

After a season with HC Dukla Trenčín in the CSL, Demitra was selected 227th overall in the 1993 NHL entry draft by the Ottawa Senators. He subsequently left Slovakia to join the Senators organization, spending three seasons split between team and their American Hockey League affiliate. A contract holdout at the start of the 1996–97 season saw Demitra traded to the St. Louis Blues. Demitra had his most successful seasons with St. Louis, being selected for three NHL All-Star Games and winning the Lady Byng Memorial Trophy in 2000. He scored at least 30 goals three times and 90 points once while with the Blues. During the 2004–05 NHL lockout, Demitra returned to HC Dukla Trenčín for, and upon returning to the NHL the following year, he signed as a free agent with the Los Angeles Kings. After one season with Los Angeles, he was traded to the Minnesota Wild, where he played for two further seasons before signing with the Vancouver Canucks, and spent his last two NHL seasons with the team. In 2010 Demitra signed with Lokomotiv Yaroslavl of the KHL, playing one season there before dying in the 2011 Lokomotiv Yaroslavl plane crash that involved most of the team prior to the 2011–12 KHL season.

Internationally, Demitra played in junior tournaments with the Czechoslovak national junior team. He won a gold medal at the 1992 IIHF European U18 Championship and a bronze medal at the 1993 IIHF World U20 Championship. After the country split in 1993, Demitra began competing for Slovakia. Beginning in 1996, he played in six IIHF World Championships, winning a bronze medal in 2003 and captaining his country in 2011. He also played in the 1996 and 2004 World Cup of Hockey. Demitra also played in three Winter Olympics: 2002, 2006 (where he was captain of the Slovak team), and 2010, where he led all scorers in points and was named to the tournament's All-Star Team.

== Playing career ==
=== Czechoslovakia ===
Initially a soccer player, like his father (who played professionally), Demitra only began to focus on hockey when he was 15. Demitra began playing at the senior level with ZŤS Dubnica in Czechoslovakia's second-tier league; he recorded 23 points (13 goals and 10 assists) over 28 games. The following season, Demitra joined HC Dukla Trenčín of the premier Czechoslovak Extraliga in 1992–93, where he scored 11 goals and 28 points in 46 games. After the season, Demitra was drafted by the Ottawa Senators in the ninth round, 227th overall in the 1993 NHL entry draft. He came to be considered one of the best draft steals in NHL history.

=== Ottawa Senators ===
Demitra began the 1993–94 season with the Ottawa Senators, and in his first NHL game on 9 October 1993, Demitra scored on St. Louis Blues goaltender Curtis Joseph for his first NHL goal and point. He played in 12 games for Ottawa during the season, scoring a goal and two points. Demitra mainly spent the season with Ottawa's American Hockey League affiliate, the Prince Edward Island Senators. In 41 AHL games Demitra recorded 41 points, sixth on the team. He spent most of the following season in the AHL, scoring 74 points in 61 games. Demitra also spent time with Ottawa, as he scored four goals and seven points in 16 games. He began the 1995–96 season in the AHL, but after scoring 81 points in 48 games was recalled to Ottawa permanently. With Ottawa, Demitra had seven goals and 17 points in 31 games.

To start the 1996–97 season, Demitra was a contract hold-out with Ottawa. He played a game with HC Dukla Trenčín]of the Slovak Extraliga, getting a goal and two points, before joining the Las Vegas Thunder of the IHL. With the Thunder, Demitra had eight goals and 21 points in 22 games. On 27 November 1996, the Senators parted ways with Demitra, as Ottawa traded him to the St. Louis Blues for Christer Olsson.

=== St. Louis Blues ===
The Blues assigned Demitra to the Grand Rapids Griffins of the IHL, where in 42 games, Demitra had 20 goals and 50 points. He was called up to the Blues, and played his first game with the club on 17 March 1997, getting no points in a 3–2 loss to the Phoenix Coyotes. Demitra scored his first two goals with St. Louis on 3 April 1997, scoring twice against Tommy Salo in a 5–5 tie with the New York Islanders. He finished the season appearing in eight games with St. Louis, scoring three goals. Demitra made his NHL playoff debut on 16 April 1997, recording his first playoff point, an assist, in the Blues 2–0 win over the Detroit Red Wings. On 22 April 1997, Demitra scored his first playoff goal, beating Red Wings goaltender Mike Vernon, and added two assists in a 4–0 win over Detroit. Overall, Demitra had a goal and four points in six playoff games.

Demitra made the NHL full-time in 1997–98, as he played in 61 games with St. Louis, scoring 22 goals and 52 points to finish fifth in team scoring. In 10 playoff games, Demitra had three goals and six points.

The 1998–99 was a break-out season for Demitra, as he finished tenth in NHL scoring with 89 points, as he scored 37 goals and added 52 assists in 82 games. Demitra appeared in the 1999 NHL All-Star Game held in Tampa, Florida, scoring a goal for the World team in an 8–6 loss to North America. In the playoffs, Demitra added five goals and nine points in 13 games.

Demitra continued his success in 1999–2000, as he scored 27 goals and 75 points in 71 games to lead the Blues in scoring once again. Demitra played in the 2000 NHL All-Star Game held in Toronto, Ontario, where he scored two goals in a 9–4 World victory over North America. Demitra also scored his first career hat trick, scoring three goals against the Mighty Ducks of Anaheim on 12 February 2000 in a 6–3 Blues victory. Demitra suffered a season-ending injury on 24 March 2000, and missed the playoffs. After the season, he was awarded the Lady Byng Memorial Trophy after he accumulated only eight penalty minutes throughout the season.

Injuries cut short Demitra's season in 2000–01 when he appeared in only 44 games with St. Louis. He scored 20 goals and 45 points to finish fifth in team scoring. He scored a hat trick and added two assists for a five-point game against the New York Rangers on 20 December 2000 in a 6–3 win. Less than a week later, on 26 December 2000, Demitra had another high scoring game, scoring two goals and four points against the Columbus Blue Jackets in a 5–0 victory. On 30 December 2000, Demitra suffered an injury, however, he came back with the team late in the season, and appeared in 15 playoff games, scoring two goals and six points.

In 2001–02, Demitra was healthy, as he appeared in all 82 games for St. Louis, scoring 35 goals and 78 points to lead the team in scoring and finish seventh in the league scoring race. Demitra had a league high ten game-winning goals. He had a four-point night against his former team, Ottawa Senators, on 27 November 2001, scoring two goals and two assists in a 4–2 victory. Demitra appeared in the 2002 NHL All-Star Game held in Los Angeles, California, however, he was held off the scoresheet in an 8–5 World win over North America. In the playoffs, Demitra appeared in 10 games, scoring four goals and 11 points. He had a four-point night against the Detroit Red Wings on 7 May 2002, scoring a goal and three assists in the Blues 6–1 victory.

The 2002–03 was Demitra's most productive in the NHL, as he set a career high with 93 points, which placed him sixth in NHL scoring, as Demitra scored 36 goals and 57 assists in 78 games. He had a hat trick and a season high four points on 29 November 2002 in a 7–2 win over the Calgary Flames. In the playoffs, Demitra had two goals and six points in seven games.

Demitra had a disappointing 2003–04 season, scoring 23 goals and 58 points, his lowest totals since his injury plagued 2000–01 season, in 68 games. In the playoffs, Demitra had a goal in five contests. This would be his final season with the Blues, as Demitra left the team fifth in franchise scoring with 493 points in 494 games.

=== HK Dukla Trenčin ===
With the 2004–05 NHL lockout cancelling the season, Demitra signed with HK Dukla Trenčín of the Slovak Extraliga on 17 September 2004. Demitra led the league in scoring with 28 goals and 82 points in 54 games. Demitra scored four goals and 17 points in 12 playoff games with the team.

=== Los Angeles Kings ===
On 2 August 2005, Demitra signed a three-year, $13.5 million contract with the Los Angeles Kings. On 5 October 2005, Demitra played his first game with the Kings, scoring an assist in a 5–4 loss to Dallas Stars. The next night, on 6 October 2005, Demitra scored his first goal with his new team, scoring against David LeNeveu of Phoenix Coyotes in a 3–2 win. Demitra had three four-point games during the season, including one on 22 November 2005 against his former team St. Louis Blues in a 6–3 Los Angeles win. Demitra missed 24 games with injuries, including an eye problem, during the season. In 58 games during the season, Demitra had 25 goals and 62 points to finish third in team scoring. On 24 June 2006, Los Angeles traded Demitra to the Minnesota Wild for Patrick O'Sullivan and a first round draft pick in the 2006 NHL entry draft.

=== Minnesota Wild ===
Demitra joined the Wild and fellow Slovak Marián Gáborík for the 2006–07 season. Demitra played his first game with the Wild on 5 October 2006, recording two assists in a 3–2 win over the Colorado Avalanche. In his next game on 7 October 2006, Demitra scored his first goal with Minnesota, scoring against Tomáš Vokoun of the Nashville Predators in a 6–5 victory. Demitra finished the season tied for first in team scoring, as he had 25 goals and 64 points in 71 games. The 64 points were the highest by Demitra since 2002–03. Demitra played in his first playoff game with Minnesota on 11 April 2007, scoring a goal against Ilya Bryzgalov of the Anaheim Ducks in a 2–1 loss. Demitra appeared in five playoff games, scoring a goal and four points.

Demitra was named the captain of the Wild for the month of October 2007 as part of the Wild's rotating captaincy to begin the 2007–08 season. Demitra had a tough season, scoring only 15 goals, his lowest total since 1996–97, and 54 points through 68 games as he finished fourth in team scoring. In the playoffs, Demitra had a goal and three points in six games. At the end of the season, he became an unrestricted free agent.

=== Vancouver Canucks ===
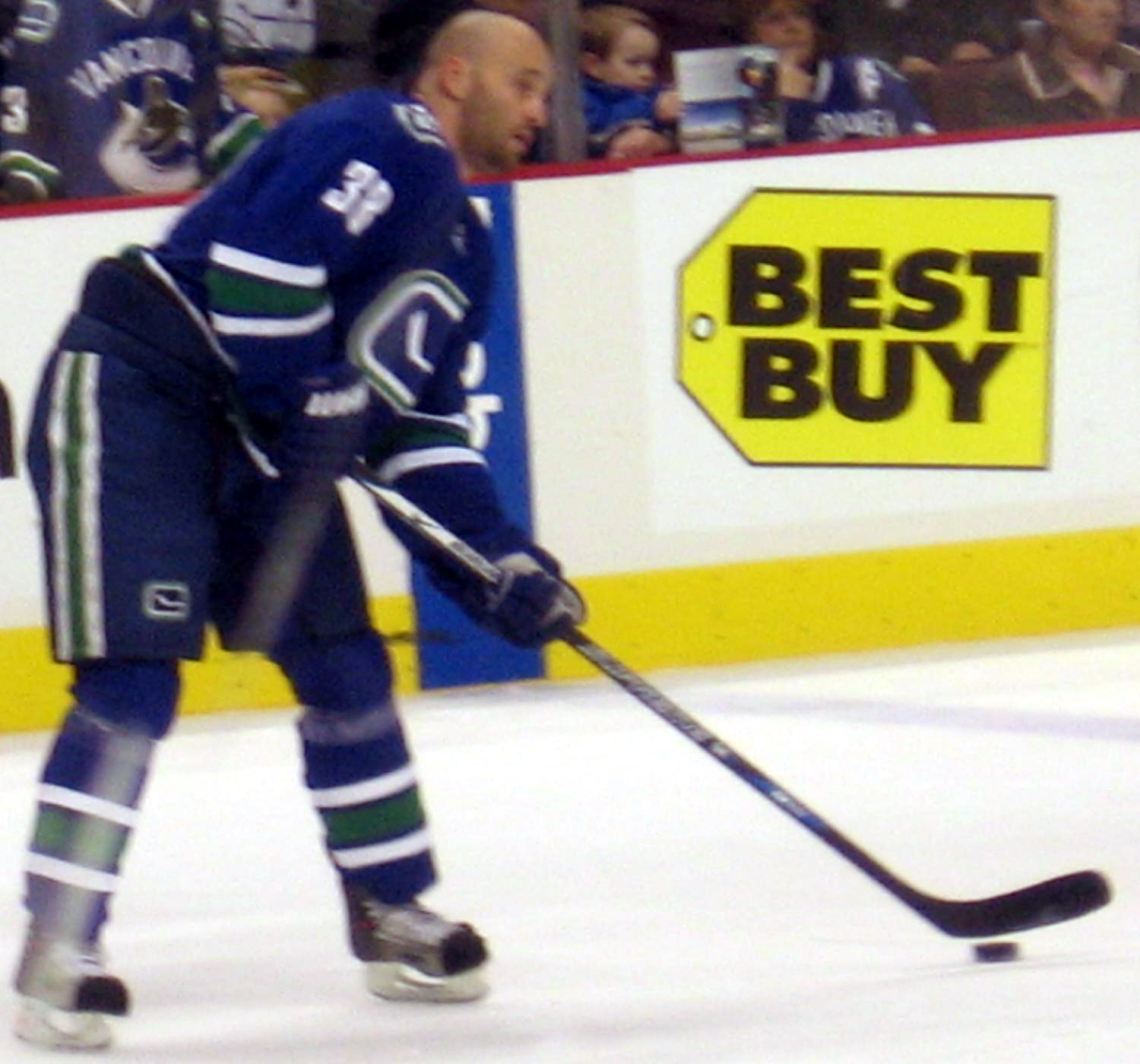
Pavol Demitra with the Vancouver Canucks in January 2009.

On 10 July 2008, Demitra signed a two-year, $8 million contract with the Vancouver Canucks. He played in his first game as a Canuck on 9 October 2008, getting no points in a 6–0 win over Calgary Flames. In his next game, also against Calgary, Demitra scored his first goal with Vancouver, the game winning overtime goal against Miikka Kiprusoff in a 5–4 win. He finished the season with 20 goals and 53 points in 69 games, finishing fourth in team scoring. Demitra appeared in his first playoff game with Vancouver on 15 April 2009, recording an assist in a 2–1 win over St. Louis Blues. Demitra scored his first playoff goal with the Canucks on 30 April 2009, scoring against Nikolai Khabibulin of the Chicago Blackhawks in a 5–3 victory. On 2 May 2009, Demitra suffered a shoulder injury against the Blackhawks that would end his season. In six playoff games, Demitra had a goal and three points.

The 2009–10 would be a tough season on Demitra, as he missed most of the regular season with the shoulder injury that occurred in the 2009 playoffs. In 28 games, Demitra had three goals and 16 points, his lowest totals since 1996–97. In the playoffs, Demitra had a three-point game against Los Angeles Kings on 23 April 2010, helping Vancouver to a 7–2 win. Overall, Demitra appeared in 11 playoff games, scoring two goals and six points. After the season, he became an unrestricted free agent. This would mark the end of Demitra's NHL career. Demitra played in 847 career games, and scored 304 goals with 464 assists for 768 points.

=== Lokomotiv Yaroslavl ===
Demitra joined Lokomotiv Yaroslavl of the KHL on 15 July 2010. In his first season with Lokomotiv, Demitra scored 18 goals and 60 points in 54 games to finish fifth in league scoring. He was named Forward of the Month in January 2011. In 18 playoff games with Yaroslavl, Demitra had six goals and 15 assists for 21 points which placed him second in KHL playoff scoring.

Demitra returned to the team for the 2011–12 season; however, on 7 September 2011, he was killed in the 2011 Lokomotiv Yaroslavl plane crash along with the entirety of the team roster and most of the flight crew.

== International play ==
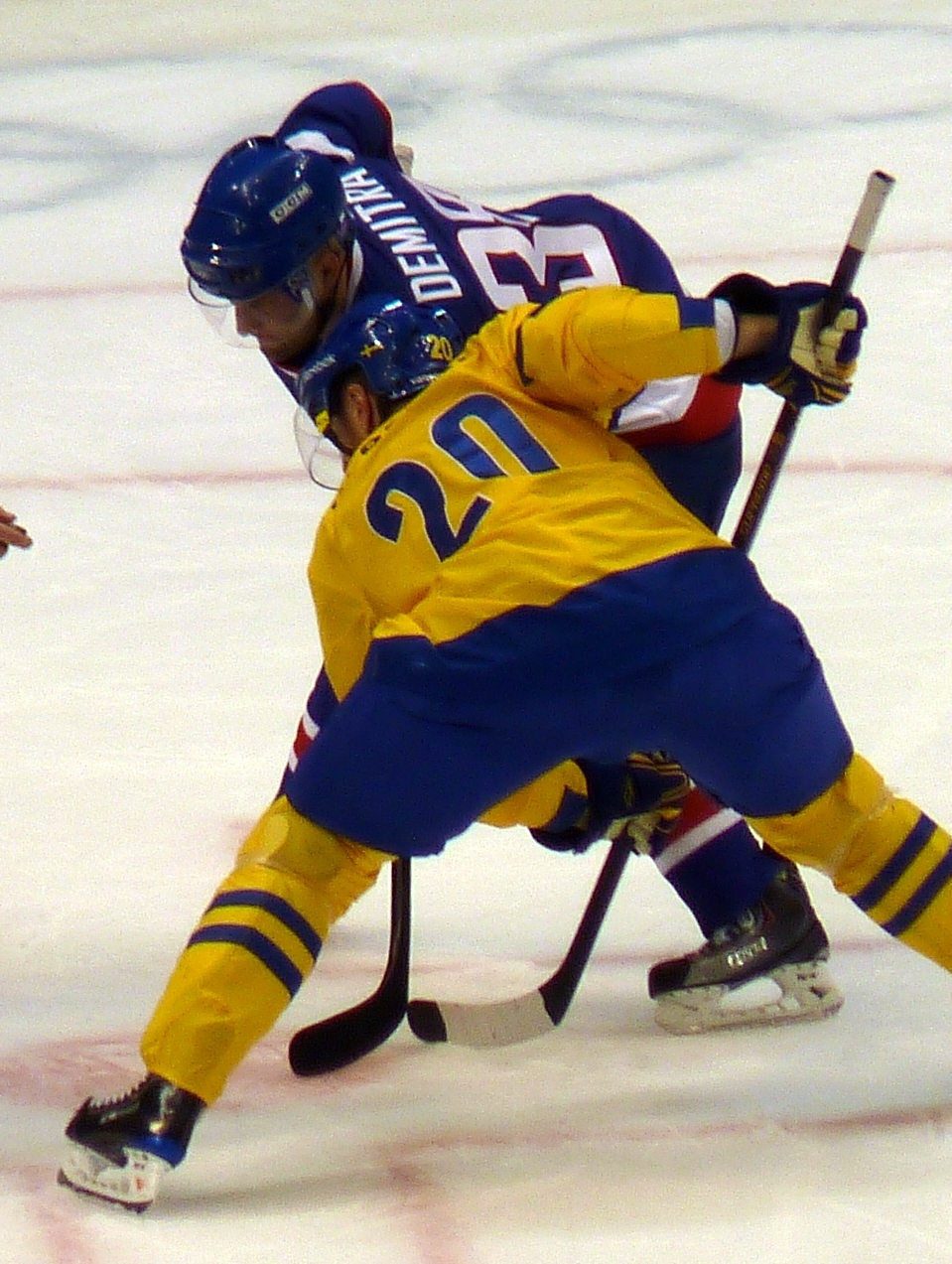
Demitra faces off with Henrik Sedin during the 2010 Olympics

Demitra was named to Team Slovakia for the 2010 Winter Olympics in his NHL hometown Vancouver. On 18 February 2010, he scored in the seventh round of a shootout to help Slovakia beat Russia in the round robin. In the semi-finals against hosts Canada, Slovakia trailed 3–0 after two periods but rallied with 2 goals in the third period, and Demitra nearly scored with 9 seconds remaining in regulation but his shot was stopped by Canucks teammate Roberto Luongo, and the save was dubbed the "Glove from Above". In the bronze medal game against Finland, Demitra assisted twice and scored once in the second period to help his team to a 3–1 lead, though they could not hold on as Finland scored four times (including an empty-net goal) in the third period to claim bronze. Slovakia was ranked in fourth place, as Demitra led the tournament in points with 10 and tied for the lead in assists with seven. His play in the tournament led him to a selection to the all-star team.

Demitra played for Czechoslovakia in the following competitions:

- 1992 European Junior Championships
- 1993 World Junior Championships (bronze medal)

Demitra played for Slovakia in the following competitions:

- 1996 World Championships
- 1996 World Cup
- 1999 Ball Hockey World Championships - 1999 (gold medal)
- 2002 Winter Olympics in Salt Lake City
- 2003 World Championships (bronze medal)
- 2004 World Championship
- 2004 World Cup
- 2005 World Championships
- 2006 Winter Olympics in Turin (captain)
- 2007 World Championships
- 2010 Winter Olympics in Vancouver
- 2011 World Championships (captain)

== Awards and achievements ==
- Awarded the Lady Byng Memorial Trophy in 2000.
- Played in the NHL All-Star Game in 1999, 2000 and 2002.
- Olympic All-Star team and leading scorer of the 2010 Winter Olympics
- Fifth on St. Louis Blues' all-time scoring list – 204 goals, 289 assists, 493 points in 494 games
- Team Slovakia retired Demitra's no. 38 jersey on 11 September 2011.
- HC Dukla Trenčín retired Demitra's no. 38 jersey on 16 September 2011. Former teammate and close friend Marián Hossa hoisted his number to the rafters.

== Death ==
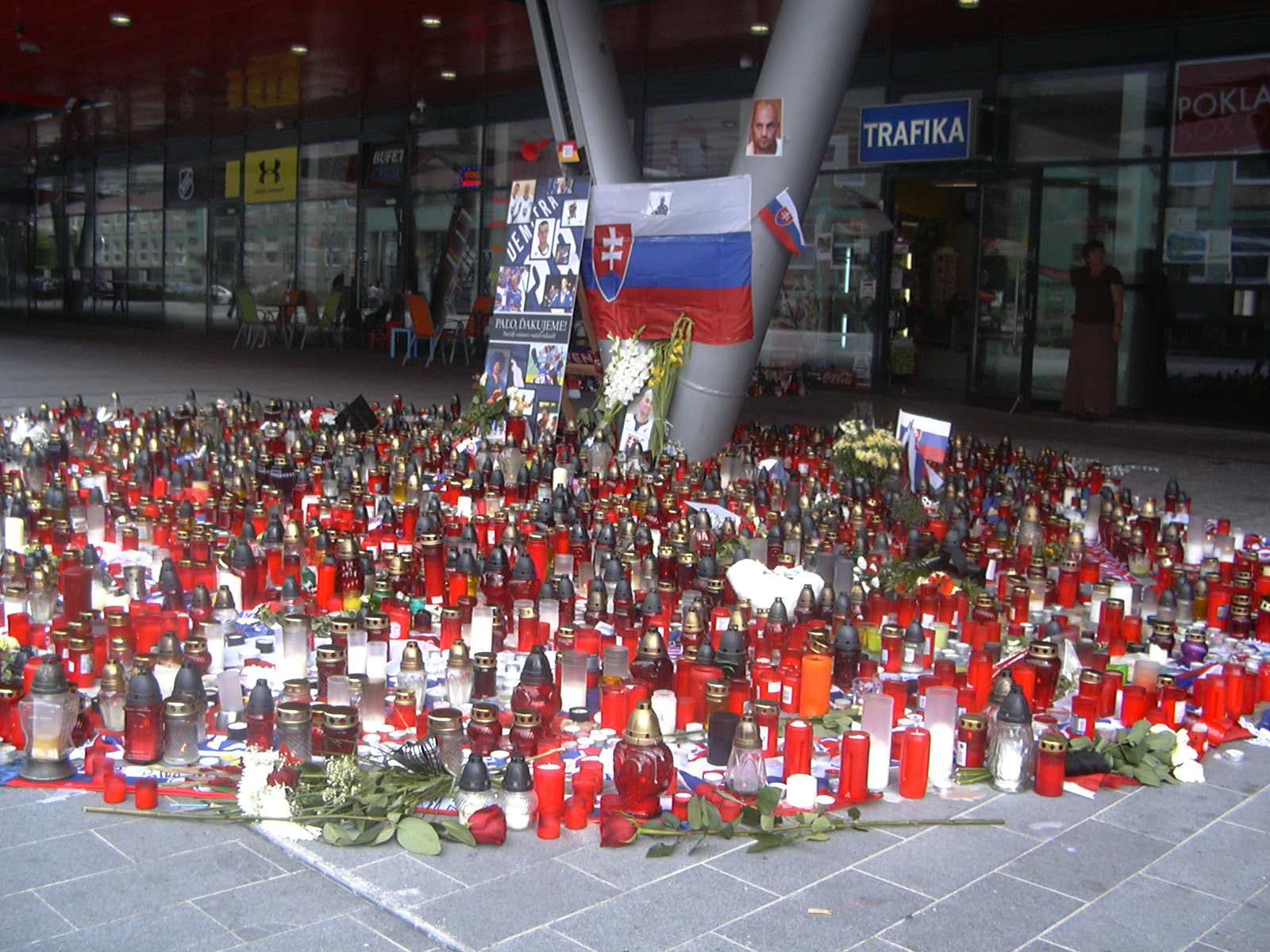
Tribute to Pavol Demitra, Ondrej Nepela Arena, Bratislava, Slovakia.

On 7 September 2011, at 4:02 PM local time, a Yakovlev Yak-42 passenger aircraft, carrying Demitra and his Lokomotiv Yaroslavl teammates, crashed near Yaroslavl, Russia, on its way to Minsk, Belarus, to start the 2011–12 KHL season. The airplane caught fire and crashed shortly after take-off, a mere four kilometers from the Tunoshna airport. Preliminary reports said that 43 of the 45 passengers on board had been killed, including 35 affiliated with the club, and that the remaining one, Alexander Galimov, was in critical condition. Galimov died a few days later.

Demitra was survived by his wife Maja and two children, Lucas and Zara. He was predeceased by his infant son, Tobias.

Following his death, the elementary school in Dubnica nad Váhom which he had attended, and the ice hockey stadium in Trenčín where he started his successful career together with famous Slovak ice hockey players Zdeno Chára, Marián Hossa, Marcel Hossa and Marián Gáborík, were named after him.

== Career statistics ==
=== Regular season and playoffs ===
Bold indicates led league

			Regular season					Playoffs
Season	Team	League	GP	G	A	Pts	PIM	GP	G	A	Pts	PIM
1991–92	Spartak ZŤS Dubnica nad Váhom	CSSR-2	28	13	10	23	12	—	—	—	—	—
1992–93	CAPEH Dubnica nad Váhom	CSSR-2	4	3	0	3	2	—	—	—	—	—
1992–93	ASVŠ Dukla Trenčín	CSSR	46	11	17	28	—	—	—	—	—	—
1993–94	Ottawa Senators	NHL	12	1	1	2	4	—	—	—	—	—
1993–94	P.E.I. Senators	AHL	41	18	23	41	8	—	—	—	—	—
1994–95	Ottawa Senators	NHL	16	4	3	7	0	—	—	—	—	—
1994–95	P.E.I. Senators	AHL	61	26	48	74	23	5	0	7	7	0
1995–96	Ottawa Senators	NHL	31	7	10	17	6	—	—	—	—	—
1995–96	P.E.I. Senators	AHL	48	28	53	81	44	—	—	—	—	—
1996–97	Dukla Trenčín	SVK	1	1	1	2	—	—	—	—	—	—
1996–97	Las Vegas Thunder	IHL	22	8	13	21	10	—	—	—	—	—
1996–97	Grand Rapids Griffins	IHL	42	20	30	50	24	—	—	—	—	—
1996–97	St. Louis Blues	NHL	8	3	0	3	2	6	1	3	4	6
1997–98	St. Louis Blues	NHL	61	22	30	52	22	10	3	3	6	2
1998–99	St. Louis Blues	NHL	82	37	52	89	16	13	5	4	9	4
1999–2000	St. Louis Blues	NHL	71	28	47	75	8	—	—	—	—	—
2000–01	St. Louis Blues	NHL	44	20	25	45	16	15	2	4	6	2
2001–02	St. Louis Blues	NHL	82	35	43	78	46	10	4	7	11	6
2002–03	St. Louis Blues	NHL	78	36	57	93	32	7	2	4	6	2
2003–04	St. Louis Blues	NHL	68	23	35	58	18	5	1	0	1	4
2004–05	Dukla Trenčín	SVK	54	**28**	**54**	**82**	39	12	4	13	17	14
2005–06	Los Angeles Kings	NHL	58	25	37	62	42	—	—	—	—	—
2006–07	Minnesota Wild	NHL	71	25	39	64	28	5	1	3	4	0
2007–08	Minnesota Wild	NHL	68	15	39	54	24	6	1	2	3	2
2008–09	Vancouver Canucks	NHL	69	20	33	53	20	6	1	2	3	2
2009–10	Vancouver Canucks	NHL	28	3	13	16	0	11	2	4	6	4
2010–11	Lokomotiv Yaroslavl	KHL	54	18	42	60	29	18	6	15	21	4
NHL totals			847	304	464	768	284	94	23	36	59	34

=== International ===
Year	Team	Event	GP	G	A	Pts	PIM
1992	Czechoslovakia	EJC	6	4	8	12	2
1993	Czechoslovakia	WJC	7	4	4	8	8
1996	Slovakia	WC	5	1	2	3	2
1996	Slovakia	WCH	3	0	0	0	4
2002	Slovakia	OLY	2	1	2	3	2
2003	Slovakia	WC	5	2	2	4	4
2004	Slovakia	WC	9	4	4	8	4
2004	Slovakia	WCH	4	0	2	2	2
2005	Slovakia	WC	7	2	5	7	2
2006	Slovakia	OLY	6	2	5	7	2
2007	Slovakia	WC	6	2	2	4	12
2010	Slovakia	OLY	7	3	7	10	2
2011	Slovakia	WC	6	1	2	3	0
Junior totals			13	8	12	20	10
Senior totals			60	18	33	51	36

=== All-Star Games ===
Year	Location	G	A	P
1999	Tampa	1	0	1
2000	Toronto	2	0	2
2002	Los Angeles	0	0	0
All-Star totals		3	0	3

== Transactions ==
- 27 November 1996 – Traded to St. Louis by Ottawa for Christer Olsson.
- 17 September 2004 – Signed as a free agent by Trenčín (Slovakia).
- 2 August 2005 – Signed as a free agent by the Los Angeles Kings.
- 24 June 2006 – Traded to the Minnesota Wild by Los Angeles for Patrick O'Sullivan and first round pick (Edmonton Oilers' pick) in 2006 NHL entry draft (Trevor Lewis).
- 10 July 2008 – Signed as a free agent by the Vancouver Canucks.

Source: "NHL.com – Players: Pavol Demitra, Canucks". NHL.com.

== See also ==
- Slovaks in the NHL
- List of ice hockey players who died during their playing career

Awards and achievements
Preceded by Wayne Gretzky	Winner of the Lady Byng Trophy; 2000	Succeeded by Joe Sakic
Sporting positions
Preceded by Mark Parrish	Minnesota Wild captain October 2007	Succeeded by Brian Rolston
