= Dmitri Afanasenkov =

Russian ice hockey player (born 1980)

- Born: May 12, 1980 (age 45) Arkhangelsk, Russian SFSR, Soviet Union
- Height: 6 ft 2 in (188 cm)
- Weight: 210 lb (95 kg; 15 st 0 lb)
- Position: Left wing
- Shot: Right
- Played for: Tampa Bay Lightning; Kloten Flyers; Philadelphia Flyers; HC Dynamo Moscow; Lokomotiv Yaroslavl; Traktor Chelyabinsk; HC Fribourg-Gottéron; Avtomobilist Yekaterinburg; HK Gomel
- National team: Russia
- NHL draft: 72nd overall, 1998; Tampa Bay Lightning
- Playing career: 2000–2013

Dmitri Anatolyevich Afanasenkov (Russian: Дмитрий Анатольевич Афанасенков; born May 12, 1980) is a Russian former professional ice hockey player who played in the National Hockey League (NHL) with the Tampa Bay Lightning and the Philadelphia Flyers.

== Playing career ==
Afanasenkov began his North American ice hockey career after being drafted by the Tampa Bay Lightning in the 1998 NHL entry draft in the third round, 72nd overall. He started playing in the Quebec Major Junior Hockey League (QMJHL) for the Moncton Wildcats in his first season, and then for the Sherbrooke Castors in the 1999–2000 and 2000–01 seasons.

Following the 2000–01 season, he was signed by the Lightning. Until the 2003–04 NHL season, he would split his time between the Lightning and their farm team. He would play for one IHL team (the Detroit Vipers) and two AHL teams (the Grand Rapids Griffins and Springfield Falcons).

During the 2003–04 NHL season, his rookie season, he scored six goals and ten assists during the regular season and three points during the Lightning's post season run to the 2004 Stanley Cup.

Following the lockout, he returned to the Lightning, but with the presence of Vincent Lecavalier, Martin St. Louis, and Brad Richards, he had limited playing time. He did not put up the numbers he could, and so, on December 30, 2006, the Lightning waived him and he was picked up by the Philadelphia Flyers. While in Philadelphia, Afanasenkov picked up the nickname "The Shark", scoring 15 points (8 goals, 7 assists) in 41 games with the Flyers. A pending restricted free agent, he was not tendered a qualifying offer and became an unrestricted free agent. He signed with Dynamo Moscow on August 1, 2007 and signed on 26 September 2009 for Lokomotiv Yaroslavl.

== Career statistics ==
=== Regular season and playoffs ===
			Regular season					Playoffs
Season	Team	League	GP	G	A	Pts	PIM	GP	G	A	Pts	PIM
1995–96	Torpedo–2 Yaroslavl	RUS.2	25	10	5	15	10	—	—	—	—	—
1996–97	Torpedo–2 Yaroslavl	RUS.3	45	20	15	35	14	—	—	—	—	—
1997–98	Torpedo Yaroslavl	RSL	1	0	0	0	0	—	—	—	—	—
1997–98	Torpedo–2 Yaroslavl	RUS.2	22	4	3	7	2	—	—	—	—	—
1998–99	Moncton Wildcats	QMJHL	15	5	5	10	12	—	—	—	—	—
1998–99	Sherbrooke Castors	QMJHL	51	23	30	53	22	13	10	6	16	6
1999–2000	Sherbrooke Castors	QMJHL	60	56	43	99	70	5	3	2	5	4
2000–01	Detroit Vipers	IHL	65	15	22	37	26	—	—	—	—	—
2000–01	Tampa Bay Lightning	NHL	9	1	1	2	4	—	—	—	—	—
2001–02	Grand Rapids Griffins	AHL	18	1	2	3	2	—	—	—	—	—
2001–02	Tampa Bay Lightning	NHL	5	0	0	0	0	—	—	—	—	—
2001–02	Springfield Falcons	AHL	28	4	5	9	4	—	—	—	—	—
2002–03	Springfield Falcons	AHL	41	4	9	13	25	—	—	—	—	—
2002–03	Kloten Flyers	NLA	—	—	—	—	—	5	1	1	2	0
2003–04	Tampa Bay Lightning	NHL	71	6	10	16	12	23	1	2	3	6
2004–05	Lada Togliatti	RSL	30	2	9	11	12	9	0	0	0	4
2005–06	Tampa Bay Lightning	NHL	68	9	6	15	16	5	0	1	1	2
2006–07	Tampa Bay Lightning	NHL	33	3	3	6	8	—	—	—	—	—
2006–07	Philadelphia Flyers	NHL	41	8	7	15	12	—	—	—	—	—
2007–08	Dynamo Moscow	RSL	45	13	6	19	56	—	—	—	—	—
2008–09	Dynamo Moscow	KHL	56	19	16	35	40	12	2	3	5	16
2009–10	Dynamo Moscow	KHL	6	1	3	4	6	—	—	—	—	—
2009–10	Lokomotiv Yaroslavl	KHL	44	12	9	21	20	8	0	0	0	4
2010–11	Traktor Chelyabinsk	KHL	30	7	8	15	18	—	—	—	—	—
2011–12	HC Fribourg–Gottéron	NLA	14	3	5	8	6	—	—	—	—	—
2012–13	Avtomobilist Yekaterinburg	KHL	3	0	0	0	2	—	—	—	—	—
2012–13	HK Gomel	BHL	5	1	4	5	8	5	1	1	2	4
NHL totals			227	27	27	54	52	28	1	3	4	6
KHL totals			139	39	37	76	86	20	2	3	5	20

=== International ===
Year	Team	Event	Result	GP	G	A	Pts	PIM
1998	Russia	EJC18	3rd place, bronze medalist(s)	6	1	1	2	4
2000	Russia	WJC	2nd place, silver medalist(s)	7	5	1	6	6
2004	Russia	WCH	6th	2	1	1	2	0
Junior totals				13	6	2	8	10
Senior totals				2	1	1	2	0

== Awards and honours ==
Award	Year
NHL
Stanley Cup (Tampa Bay Lightning)	2004
