= Martin Cibák =

Slovak ice hockey player (born 1980)

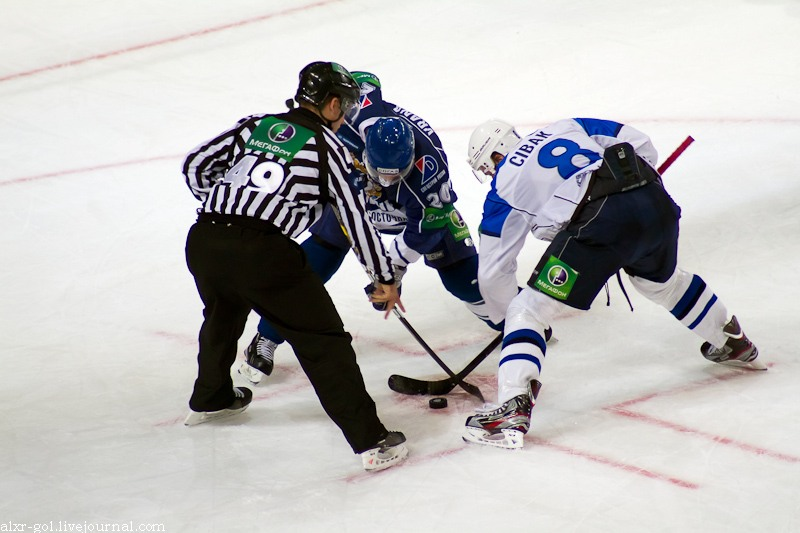
- KHL game Amur Khabarovsk vs. HC Neftekhimik Nizhnekamsk on September 26, 2011. Face-off Petr Vrána (in blue) vs. Martin Cibák.
- Born: 17 May 1980 (age 46) Liptovský Mikuláš, Czechoslovakia
- Height: 6 ft 1 in (185 cm)
- Weight: 196 lb (89 kg; 14 st 0 lb)
- Position: Centre
- Shot: Left
- Played for: MHk 32; Detroit Vipers; Springfield Falcons; Tampa Bay Lightning; Hershey Bears; HC Plzeň; HC Košice; Frölunda HC; Södertälje SK; HC Spartak Moscow; Severstal Cherepovets; HC Neftekhimik Nizhnekamsk; HC Vityaz; HC Olomouc; PSG Berani Zlín
- National team: Slovakia
- NHL draft: 252nd overall, 1998; Tampa Bay Lightning
- Playing career: 1998–2016

Martin Cibák (born 17 May 1980) is a Slovak former professional ice hockey player.

== Biography ==
Cibák was born in Liptovský Mikuláš, Czechoslovakia. As a youth, he played in the 1994 Quebec International Pee-Wee Hockey Tournament with a team from Poprad.

Cibák won the Stanley Cup with Tampa Bay Lightning in the 2003–04 NHL season, and also played with the Slovak National Team in the 2004 World Cup of Hockey. Cibak earned the nickname "Cibby" while playing for the Tampa Bay Lightning.

He signed a one-year contract with Frölunda HC in August, 2006. In summer 2007, he signed a contract with Södertälje SK and left the club on 26 April 2009 to sign with HC Spartak Moscow on 6 May 2009.

Slalom canoeist Peter Cibák is his cousin.

== Career statistics ==
=== Regular season and playoffs ===
			Regular season					Playoffs
Season	Team	League	GP	G	A	Pts	PIM	GP	G	A	Pts	PIM
1995–96	HK 32 Liptovský Mikuláš	SVK U18	45	32	18	50	64	—	—	—	—	—
1996–97	HK 32 Liptovský Mikuláš	SVK U20	52	18	29	47	54	—	—	—	—	—
1997–98	HK 32 Liptovský Mikuláš	SVK U20	20	8	11	19	6	—	—	—	—	—
1997–98	HK 32 Liptovský Mikuláš	SVK	33	2	4	6	18	—	—	—	—	—
1998–99	Medicine Hat Tigers	WHL	66	21	26	47	72	—	—	—	—	—
1999–2000	Medicine Hat Tigers	WHL	58	16	29	45	77	—	—	—	—	—
2000–01	Detroit Vipers	IHL	79	10	28	38	88	—	—	—	—	—
2001–02	Springfield Falcons	AHL	52	5	9	14	44	—	—	—	—	—
2001–02	Tampa Bay Lightning	NHL	26	1	5	6	8	—	—	—	—	—
2002–03	Springfield Falcons	AHL	62	5	15	20	78	6	1	2	3	4
2003–04	Hershey Bears	AHL	1	0	0	0	2	—	—	—	—	—
2003–04	Tampa Bay Lightning	NHL	63	2	7	9	30	6	0	1	1	0
2004–05	HK 32 Liptovský Mikuláš	SVK	4	0	0	0	6	—	—	—	—	—
2004–05	HC Lasselsberger Plzeň	ELH	30	4	11	15	52	—	—	—	—	—
2004–05	HC Košice	SVK	6	1	3	4	8	10	2	5	7	36
2005–06	Tampa Bay Lightning	NHL	65	2	6	8	22	5	0	0	0	0
2006–07	Frölunda HC	SEL	55	10	13	23	94	—	—	—	—	—
2007–08	Södertälje SK	SEL	51	3	8	11	62	—	—	—	—	—
2008–09	Södertälje SK	SEL	49	10	13	23	94	—	—	—	—	—
2009–10	Spartak Moscow	KHL	50	17	15	32	93	10	0	2	2	36
2010–11	Spartak Moscow	KHL	4	0	0	0	8	—	—	—	—	—
2010–11	Severstal Cherepovets	KHL	41	10	3	13	42	6	0	0	0	10
2011–12	Nefekhimik Nizhnekamsk	KHL	45	7	19	26	60	—	—	—	—	—
2012–13	Nefekhimik Nizhnekamsk	KHL	48	8	10	18	58	4	0	0	0	4
2013–14	Nefekhimik Nizhnekamsk	KHL	38	6	6	12	58	—	—	—	—	—
2013–14	HC Vityaz	KHL	16	2	1	13	16	—	—	—	—	—
2014–15	HC Olomouc	ELH	48	11	9	20	106	—	—	—	—	—
2015–16	PSG Zlín	ELH	50	3	6	9	50	1	0	0	0	0
2016–17	MHk 32 Liptovský Mikuláš	SVK	29	3	6	9	58	—	—	—	—	—
NHL totals			154	5	18	23	60	11	0	1	1	0
SEL totals			155	23	34	57	250	—	—	—	—	—
KHL totals			242	50	53	103	335	20	0	2	2	50

=== International ===
Year	Team	Event	GP	G	A	Pts	PIM
1998	Slovakia	EJC	6	3	0	3	10
1999	Slovakia	WJC	6	2	3	5	6
2000	Slovakia	WJC	7	2	1	3	4
2004	Slovakia	WCH	4	1	0	1	0
2006	Slovakia	WC	7	2	1	3	8
2010	Slovakia	OG	7	0	0	0	6
2011	Slovakia	WC	3	0	1	1	2
Junior totals			19	7	4	11	20
Senior totals			21	3	2	5	16
