= Alexander Khavanov =

Russian ice hockey player

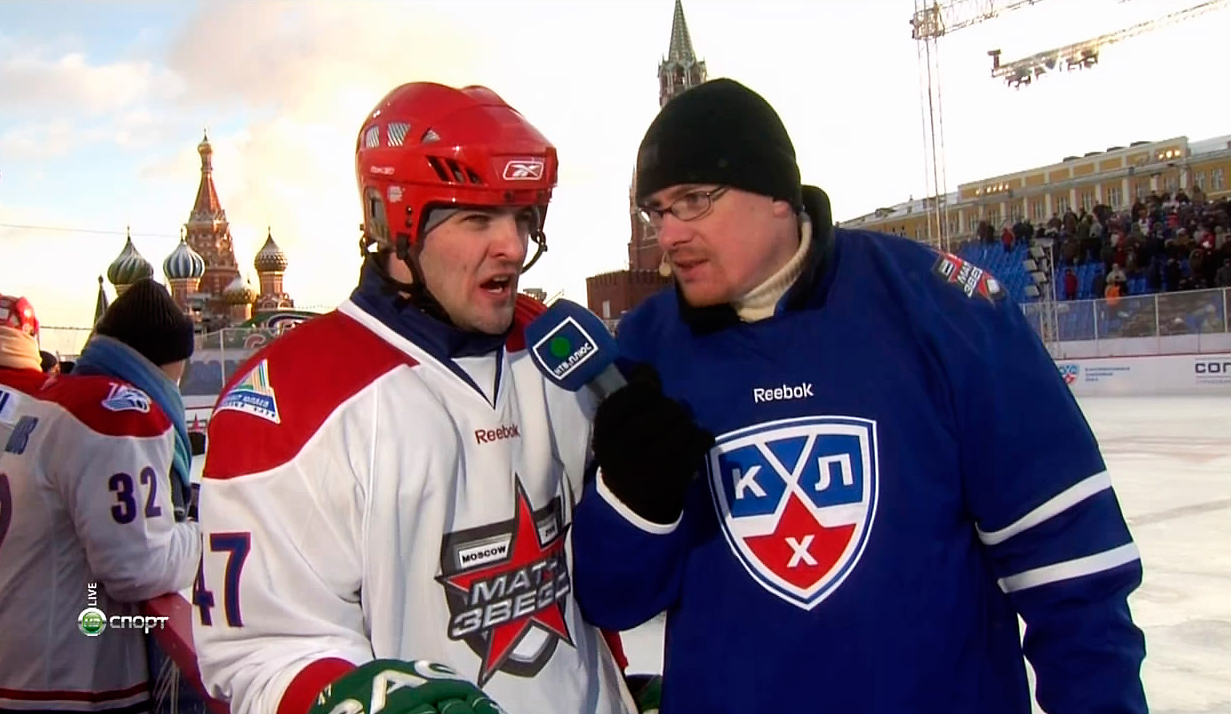
- Radulov and Khavanov
- Born: January 30, 1972 (age 54) Moscow, Soviet Union
- Height: 6 ft 2 in (188 cm)
- Weight: 205 lb (93 kg; 14 st 9 lb)
- Position: Defence
- Shot: Left
- Played for: SKA Saint Petersburg; HPK; Severstal Cherepovets; HC Dynamo Moscow; St. Louis Blues; Toronto Maple Leafs; HC Davos
- National team: Russia
- NHL draft: 232nd overall, 1999; St. Louis Blues
- Playing career: 1989–2007

Alexander Pavlovich Khavanov (Russian: Александр Павлович Хаванов, born January 30, 1972) is a former professional ice hockey defenceman who played in the NHL for the St. Louis Blues and Toronto Maple Leafs.

== Career ==
Khavanov was drafted in the 8th round (232nd overall) by the St. Louis Blues in the 1999 NHL entry draft.

Khavanov scored two goals, including the game-tying goal with less than 30 seconds remaining in regulation, for the Blues in their victorious "Wednesday Night Miracle" game where the Blues were trailing 5–0 to the Toronto Maple Leafs.

Khavanov left the NHL to play 2006 / 2007 season with HC Davos in Switzerland.

== Jersey numbers ==
- SKA Saint Petersburg – Number 3 (1993–1994)
- SKA Saint Petersburg – Number 35 (1994–1996)
- Severstal Cherepovets – Number 30 (1996–1998)
- Dynamo Moscow – Number 21 (1998–2000)
- St. Louis Blues – Number 29 (2000–2004)
- SKA Saint Petersburg – Number 35 (2004–2005)
- Toronto Maple Leafs – Number 25 (2005–2006)
- Russian National Team – Number 4 (1998–2000)
- Russian National Team – Number 29 (2002–2004)

== Career statistics ==
=== Regular season and playoffs ===
			Regular season					Playoffs
Season	Team	League	GP	G	A	Pts	PIM	GP	G	A	Pts	PIM
1990–91	Argus Moscow	URS.4
1991–92	Argus Moscow	CIS.4
1992–93	Birmingham Bulls	ECHL	19	0	3	3	14	—	—	—	—	—
1992–93	Raleigh IceCaps	ECHL	17	0	6	6	8	—	—	—	—	—
1992–93	Vyatich Ryazan	RUS.2	4	0	2	2	0	—	—	—	—	—
1993–94	SKA St. Petersburg	IHL	41	1	2	3	24	—	—	—	—	—
1994–95	SKA St. Petersburg	IHL	49	7	0	7	32	3	0	0	0	0
1994–95	SKA–2 St. Petersburg	RUS.2	2	1	1	2	2	—	—	—	—	—
1995–96	SKA St. Petersburg	IHL	32	1	5	6	41	—	—	—	—	—
1995–96	HPK	SM-l	16	0	2	2	4	9	0	0	0	0
1996–97	Severstal Cherepovets	RSL	39	3	8	11	56	3	1	0	1	4
1997–98	Severstal Cherepovets	RSL	44	3	5	8	46	—	—	—	—	—
1998–99	Dynamo Moscow	RSL	40	2	7	9	14	16	1	5	6	35
1999–2000	Dynamo Moscow	RSL	38	5	11	16	49	17	0	3	3	4
2000–01	St. Louis Blues	NHL	74	7	16	23	52	15	3	2	5	14
2001–02	St. Louis Blues	NHL	81	3	21	24	55	4	0	0	0	2
2002–03	St. Louis Blues	NHL	81	8	25	33	48	7	2	3	5	2
2003–04	St. Louis Blues	NHL	48	3	7	10	18	—	—	—	—	—
2004–05	SKA St. Petersburg	RSL	3	0	0	0	27	—	—	—	—	—
2005–06	Toronto Maple Leafs	NHL	64	6	6	12	60	—	—	—	—	—
2006–07	HC Davos	NLA	34	1	19	20	72	—	—	—	—	—
IHL totals			122	9	7	16	97	3	0	0	0	0
RSL totals			164	13	31	44	192	39	2	9	11	47
NHL totals			348	27	75	102	233	26	5	5	10	18

=== International ===
Year	Team	Event	Result	GP	G	A	Pts	PIM
1999	Russia	WC	5th	6	0	0	0	6
2000	Russia	WC	11th	4	0	2	2	0
2003	Russia	WC	5th	4	0	1	1	0
2004	Russia	WCH	5th	4	0	1	1	4
Senior totals				18	0	4	4	10
