= Ossi Väänänen =

Finnish ice hockey player (born 1980)

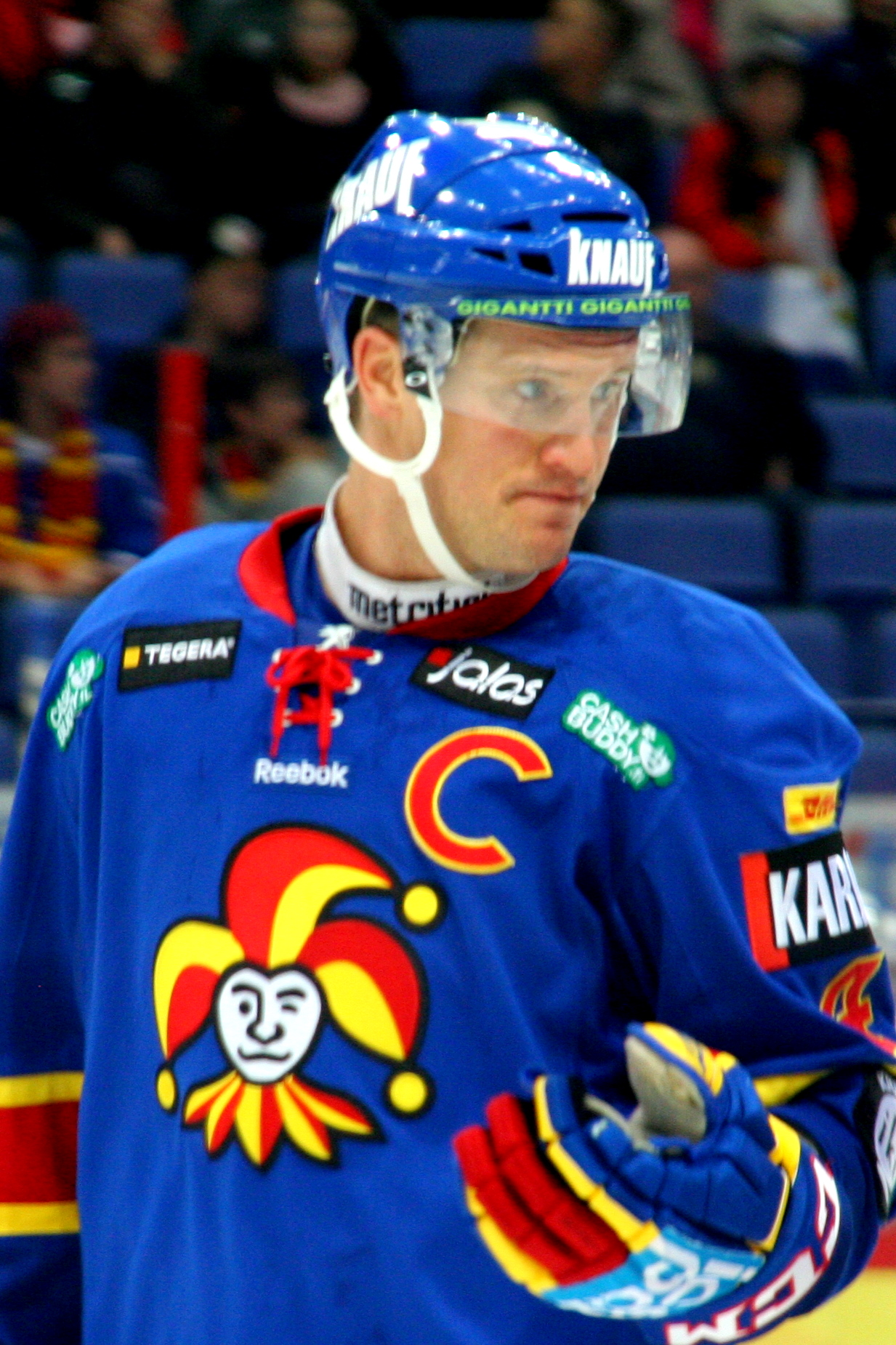
- Born: August 18, 1980 (age 46) Vantaa, Finland
- Height: 6 ft 4 in (193 cm)
- Weight: 220 lb (100 kg; 15 st 10 lb)
- Position: Defense
- Shot: Left
- Played for: Jokerit; Phoenix Coyotes; Colorado Avalanche; Djurgårdens IF; Philadelphia Flyers; Vancouver Canucks; Dynamo Minsk
- National team: Finland
- NHL draft: 43rd overall, 1998; Phoenix Coyotes
- Playing career: 1998–2016

Ossi Reijo Juhani Väänänen (Finnish pronunciation: [ˈosːi ˈvæːnænen]; born August 18, 1980) is a Finnish former professional ice hockey defenceman. He was the captain of Jokerit of the Kontinental Hockey League (KHL), with whom he has previously won two silver medals as runner-up for the Kanada-malja in 2000 and 2005 in the Finnish Liiga. He was originally drafted by the Phoenix Coyotes and has additionally played for the Colorado Avalanche, Philadelphia Flyers and Vancouver Canucks in the National Hockey League (NHL).

== Playing career ==
After a junior career with Jokerit's under-18 and junior teams, Väänänen was drafted by the Phoenix Coyotes in the 1998 NHL entry draft as their second-round pick, 43rd overall. He remained in Finland to play with Jokerit in the professional SM-liiga for two seasons, winning a silver medal with the team in 2000 as runner-up for the Kanada-malja, the SM-liiga's championship trophy. Väänänen then joined the Coyotes in 2000–01 and recorded 16 points in his rookie season. In his fourth season with the Coyotes in 2003–04, he was traded at the trade deadline to the Colorado Avalanche (along with Chris Gratton and a second-round draft choice, used to select Paul Stastny) in 2005 in exchange for Derek Morris and Keith Ballard.

Due to the subsequent NHL lockout, Väänänen returned to Jokerit in 2004–05 and helped his former team to another silver medal, losing the Finnish championship to Kärpät. Returning to the NHL in 2005–06, he played two more seasons with the Avalanche before returning to Europe to play in the Swedish Elitserien for Djurgårdens IF during the 2007–08 season.

On July 1, 2008, Väänänen signed a one-year contract with the Philadelphia Flyers. However, late in the 2008–09 season, on February 27, 2009, he was placed on waivers and claimed by the Vancouver Canucks. The move by the Flyers, which also included waiving Glen Metropolit, was precipitated by the imminent return of forward Daniel Brière from injury, requiring the club to dump salary to remain under the cap. On August 2, 2009, Väänänen joined national teammate Ville Peltonen, signing a one-year contract with Dynamo Minsk of the Kontinental Hockey League (KHL). He appeared in 52 games and recorded 6 assists as Minsk failed to make the playoffs in 2009–10.

On May 3, 2010, Väänänen returned to Finland signing a contract with his original club, Jokerit, of the SM-liiga.

On July 13, 2016, after six additional seasons with Jokerit, Väänänen retired from professional hockey, having been restricted to just six games due to injury in the 2015–16 season.

== International play ==
Medal record

Representing Finland

Ice hockey

Olympic Games
Bronze medal – third place	2014 Sochi	

World Cup
Silver medal – second place	2004 Toronto	

World Championships
Gold medal – first place	2011 Slovakia	
Silver medal – second place	2001 Germany	
Bronze medal – third place	2008 Canada	

As a junior, Väänänen competed for Finland at the European Junior Championships in 1998 and World Junior Championships in 1999 and 2000. At the senior level, he has represented team Finland in five World Championships, earning a silver medal in 2001 and a bronze medal in 2008. In 2011 he won a gold medal.

At the 2004 World Cup of Hockey, Väänänen contributed an international career-high three points in four games, helping Finland to the World Cup final, where they were defeated by Canada. He made his Olympic Games debut at the 2002 Games in Salt Lake City. Four years later, he was named to the Finnish team for the 2006 Winter Olympics in Turin, where he earned a silver medal despite not appearing in any games.

== Awards ==
- Won the Finnish Junior Player of the Year Award in 2000.

== Career statistics ==
=== Regular season and playoffs ===
			Regular season					Playoffs
Season	Team	League	GP	G	A	Pts	PIM	GP	G	A	Pts	PIM
1996–97	Jokerit	FIN U18	18	1	2	3	43	—	—	—	—	—
1996–97	Jokerit	FIN U20	1	0	0	0	0	—	—	—	—	—
1997–98	Jokerit	FIN U18	7	3	3	6	8	—	—	—	—	—
1997–98	Jokerit	FIN U20	31	0	6	6	24	7	0	2	2	16
1998–99	Jokerit	FIN U20	12	1	6	7	16	6	1	0	1	12
1998–99	Jokerit	SM-l	48	0	1	1	42	3	0	1	1	0
1999–2000	Jokerit	SM-l	49	1	6	7	46	11	1	1	2	2
2000–01	Phoenix Coyotes	NHL	81	4	12	16	90	—	—	—	—	—
2001–02	Phoenix Coyotes	NHL	76	2	12	14	74	5	0	0	0	6
2002–03	Phoenix Coyotes	NHL	67	2	7	9	82	—	—	—	—	—
2003–04	Phoenix Coyotes	NHL	67	2	4	6	87	—	—	—	—	—
2003–04	Colorado Avalanche	NHL	12	0	0	0	2	11	0	1	1	18
2004–05	Jokerit	SM-l	28	2	2	4	30	12	0	0	0	26
2005–06	Colorado Avalanche	NHL	53	0	4	4	56	1	0	0	0	0
2006–07	Colorado Avalanche	NHL	74	2	6	8	69	—	—	—	—	—
2007–08	Djurgårdens IF	SEL	45	7	8	15	102	5	0	0	0	2
2008–09	Philadelphia Flyers	NHL	46	1	9	10	22	—	—	—	—	—
2008–09	Vancouver Canucks	NHL	3	0	1	1	0	3	0	0	0	2
2009–10	Dinamo Minsk	KHL	52	0	6	6	76	—	—	—	—	—
2010–11	Jokerit	SM-l	60	2	11	13	79	7	1	2	3	2
2011–12	Jokerit	SM-l	57	5	16	21	98	10	1	2	3	8
2012–13	Jokerit	SM-l	53	2	11	13	61	6	0	3	3	6
2013–14	Jokerit	Liiga	44	1	4	5	24	2	0	0	0	0
2014–15	Jokerit	KHL	44	0	6	6	60	10	0	1	1	33
2015–16	Jokerit	KHL	6	0	0	0	2	—	—	—	—	—
SM-l/Liiga totals			339	13	51	64	380	51	3	9	12	44
NHL totals			479	13	55	68	482	20	0	1	1	26
KHL totals			102	0	12	12	138	10	0	1	1	33

=== International ===
Year	Team	Event	Result	GP	G	A	Pts	PIM
1998	Finland	EJC	2nd place, silver medalist(s)	6	0	0	0	20
1999	Finland	WJC	5th	6	0	2	2	8
2000	Finland	WJC	7th	7	0	0	0	16
2001	Finland	WC	2nd place, silver medalist(s)	9	0	2	2	16
2002	Finland	OG	6th	2	0	1	1	0
2003	Finland	WC	5th	7	0	4	4	8
2004	Finland	WCH	2nd place, silver medalist(s)	4	1	2	3	0
2005	Finland	WC	7th	7	0	1	1	8
2008	Finland	WC	3rd place, bronze medalist(s)	9	0	1	1	8
2011	Finland	WC	1st place, gold medalist(s)	9	0	0	0	4
2012	Finland	WC	4th	10	0	1	1	4
2013	Finland	WC	4th	10	1	3	4	6
2014	Finland	OG	3rd place, bronze medalist(s)	6	0	2	2	0
Junior totals				19	0	2	2	44
Senior totals				73	2	17	19	54

== Transactions ==
- June 27, 1998 – Drafted in the second round, 43rd overall, by the Phoenix Coyotes at the 1998 NHL entry draft.
- March 9, 2004 – Traded to the Colorado Avalanche from the Phoenix Coyotes along with Chris Gratton and a second-round choice (Paul Stastny) in 2005 in exchange for Derek Morris and Keith Ballard
- December 1, 2004 – Signed as a free agent by Jokerit.
- July 1, 2008 – Signed to a one-year contract by the Philadelphia Flyers.
- February 27, 2009 – Put on waivers by the Philadelphia Flyers, claimed by the Vancouver Canucks.
