= Brad Lazarowich =

Canadian ice hockey official

- Born: August 4, 1962 (age 64) Vancouver, British Columbia, Canada
- Position: Linesman

Brad Lazarowich (born August 4, 1962) is a Canadian former National Hockey League linesman and the current director of officiating and player safety for the British Columbia Hockey League.

== Background ==
Born in Vancouver, British Columbia, Lazarowich has worked more than 2,000 NHL games. He has officiated three Stanley Cup Finals and the Memorial Cup, and has also worked two World Cup of Hockey tournaments, and the 2014 Heritage Classic. On April 3, 2016, Lazarowich officiated the last regular NHL season game of his career at MTS Centre in Winnipeg, Manitoba, Canada. He wore uniform number #86.
