= Kim Johnsson =

Swedish ice hockey player (born 1976)

- Born: March 16, 1976 (age 50) Malmö, Sweden
- Height: 6 ft 1 in (185 cm)
- Weight: 193 lb (88 kg; 13 st 11 lb)
- Position: Defence
- Shot: Left
- Played for: Malmö Redhawks; New York Rangers; Philadelphia Flyers; HC Ambrì-Piotta; Minnesota Wild; Chicago Blackhawks
- National team: Sweden
- NHL draft: 286th overall, 1994; New York Rangers
- Playing career: 1993–2010
Medal record
Representing Sweden
Ice hockey
World Championships
| Gold medal – first place | 1998 Switzerland |
| Bronze medal – third place | 1999 Norway |
| Bronze medal – third place | 2001 Germany |
| Bronze medal – third place | 2002 Sweden |
World Junior Championships
| Silver medal – second place | 1996 United States |

Kim Emil Jörgen Johnsson (born March 16, 1976) is a Swedish former professional ice hockey defenceman who played ten seasons in the National Hockey League (NHL) for the New York Rangers, Philadelphia Flyers, Minnesota Wild and Chicago Blackhawks. He played six seasons for the Malmö Redhawks in the Swedish Elitserien prior to his NHL career.

== Playing career ==
Johnsson was selected 286th overall by the New York Rangers in the 1994 NHL entry draft, the last pick in that draft. After playing two seasons with the Rangers, he was traded to the Philadelphia Flyers on August 20, 2001, along with Jan Hlaváč, Pavel Brendl, and a third-round pick in exchange for Eric Lindros.

After four seasons with the Flyers, Johnsson signed a four-year contract with the Minnesota Wild on July 1, 2006.

On February 12, 2010, after playing 52 games with the Wild, Johnsson and Nick Leddy were traded to the Chicago Blackhawks for Cam Barker. He played eight regular season games for Chicago before getting injured. Johnsson missed the remaining 14 regular season games and all 22 playoff games in the Blackhawks run to the Stanley Cup in the 2010 playoffs because of a concussion sustained on 13 March in a 3–2 win over his former team, the Philadelphia Flyers. While the Blackhawks won the Stanley Cup that year beating the Nashville Predators, Vancouver Canucks and San Jose Sharks in the first three rounds before beating out his former team, the Philadelphia Flyers in the Stanley Cup Final. Johnsson did not play 41 games for Chicago, and his name was not engraved on the Stanley Cup. Johnsson never played again after suffering his concussion.

As of April 2020, Johnsson has returned to private life in Sweden. Scott Powers of The Athletic attempted to reach Johnsson, but he declined an interview via his agent. Johnsson did, however, reveal that he returned to full health following his career-ending concussion and that he was satisfied with his life after hockey.

== International play ==
Played for Sweden in the 2002 Winter Olympics.

== Career statistics ==
=== Regular season and playoffs ===
| | | | Regular season | | | | | Playoffs |
| Season | Team | League | GP | G | A | Pts | PIM | GP | G | A | Pts | PIM |
|---|---|---|---|---|---|---|---|---|---|---|---|---|
| 1993–94 | Malmö IF | SWE U20 | 14 | 5 | 3 | 8 | 14 | — | — | — | — | — |
| 1993–94 | Malmö IF | SEL | 2 | 0 | 0 | 0 | 0 | — | — | — | — | — |
| 1994–95 | Malmö IF | J20 | 29 | 6 | 15 | 21 | 40 | — | — | — | — | — |
| 1994–95 | Malmö IF | SEL | 12 | 0 | 0 | 0 | 4 | 1 | 0 | 0 | 0 | 0 |
| 1995–96 | Malmö IF | J20 | 2 | 3 | 1 | 4 | 4 | — | — | — | — | — |
| 1995–96 | Malmö IF | SEL | 38 | 2 | 0 | 2 | 30 | 4 | 0 | 1 | 1 | 8 |
| 1996–97 | MIF Redhawks | SEL | 49 | 4 | 9 | 13 | 42 | 4 | 0 | 0 | 0 | 2 |
| 1997–98 | MIF Redhawks | SEL | 45 | 5 | 9 | 14 | 34 | — | — | — | — | — |
| 1998–99 | MIF Redhawks | SEL | 49 | 9 | 8 | 17 | 74 | 8 | 2 | 3 | 5 | 12 |
| 1999–00 | New York Rangers | NHL | 76 | 6 | 15 | 21 | 46 | — | — | — | — | — |
| 2000–01 | New York Rangers | NHL | 75 | 5 | 21 | 26 | 40 | — | — | — | — | — |
| 2001–02 | Philadelphia Flyers | NHL | 82 | 11 | 30 | 41 | 42 | 5 | 0 | 0 | 0 | 2 |
| 2002–03 | Philadelphia Flyers | NHL | 82 | 10 | 29 | 39 | 38 | 13 | 0 | 3 | 3 | 8 |
| 2003–04 | Philadelphia Flyers | NHL | 80 | 13 | 29 | 42 | 26 | 15 | 2 | 6 | 8 | 8 |
| 2004–05 | HC Ambrì–Piotta | NLA | 24 | 4 | 10 | 14 | 61 | — | — | — | — | — |
| 2005–06 | Philadelphia Flyers | NHL | 47 | 6 | 19 | 25 | 34 | — | — | — | — | — |
| 2006–07 | Minnesota Wild | NHL | 76 | 3 | 19 | 22 | 64 | 4 | 0 | 0 | 0 | 2 |
| 2007–08 | Minnesota Wild | NHL | 80 | 4 | 23 | 27 | 42 | 6 | 0 | 1 | 1 | 18 |
| 2008–09 | Minnesota Wild | NHL | 81 | 2 | 22 | 24 | 44 | — | — | — | — | — |
| 2009–10 | Minnesota Wild | NHL | 52 | 6 | 8 | 14 | 26 | — | — | — | — | — |
| 2009–10 | Chicago Blackhawks | NHL | 8 | 1 | 2 | 3 | 4 | — | — | — | — | — |
| SEL totals | | | 195 | 20 | 26 | 46 | 184 | 17 | 2 | 4 | 6 | 22 |
| NHL totals | | | 739 | 67 | 217 | 284 | 406 | 43 | 2 | 10 | 12 | 38 |

=== International ===
| Year | Team | Event | GP | G | A | Pts | PIM |
|---|---|---|---|---|---|---|---|
| 1994 | Sweden | EJC | 5 | 0 | 1 | 1 | 0 |
| 1996 | Sweden | WJC | 7 | 1 | 2 | 3 | 6 |
| 1998 | Sweden | WC | 10 | 1 | 0 | 1 | 4 |
| 1999 | Sweden | WC | 10 | 0 | 0 | 0 | 4 |
| 2001 | Sweden | WC | 9 | 4 | 4 | 8 | 6 |
| 2002 | Sweden | OLY | 4 | 1 | 1 | 2 | 0 |
| 2002 | Sweden | WC | 6 | 0 | 1 | 1 | 2 |
| 2004 | Sweden | WCH | 4 | 1 | 3 | 4 | 0 |
| Junior totals | | | 12 | 1 | 3 | 4 | 6 |
| Senior totals | | | 43 | 7 | 9 | 16 | 16 |

== Awards and honors ==
- 2001–02: Barry Ashbee Trophy (Best Defenseman (Philadelphia Flyers))
- 2003–04: Barry Ashbee Trophy (Best Defenseman (Philadelphia Flyers))

| Preceded by Mikko Koivu | Minnesota Wild captain December 2008 | Succeeded by Mikko Koivu |
