= Ilya Bryzgalov =

Russian ice hockey player (born 1980)

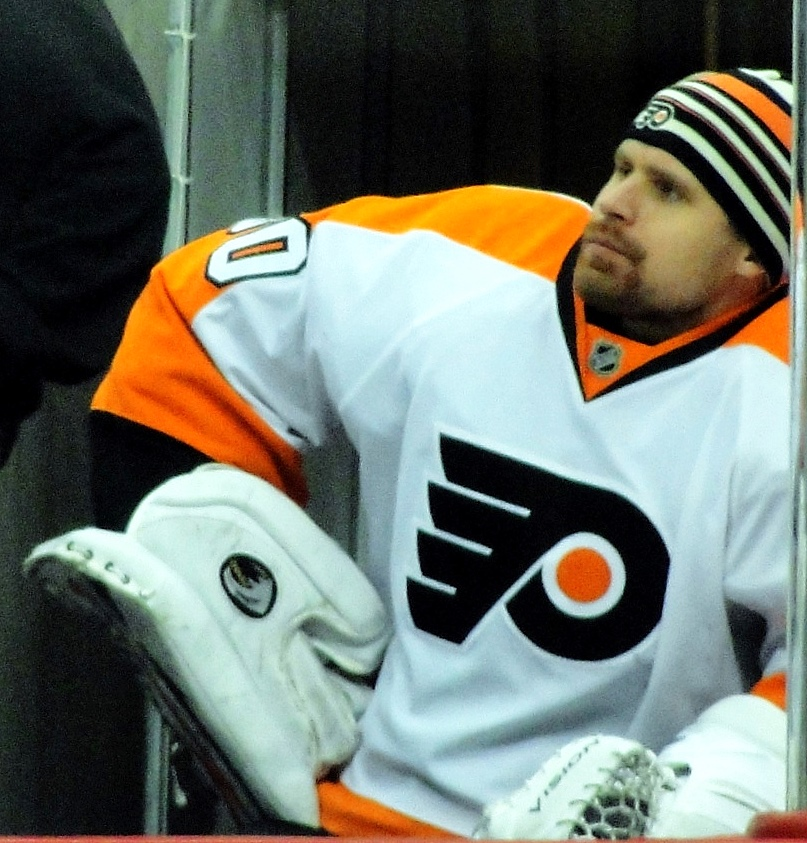
- Bryzgalov with the Philadelphia Flyers in 2011
- Born: 22 June 1980 (age 46) Tolyatti, Russian SFSR, Soviet Union
- Height: 6 ft 3 in (191 cm)
- Weight: 213 lb (97 kg; 15 st 3 lb)
- Position: Goaltender
- Caught: Left
- Played for: Lada Togliatti; Anaheim Ducks; Phoenix Coyotes; Philadelphia Flyers; CSKA Moscow; Edmonton Oilers; Minnesota Wild
- National team: Russia
- NHL draft: 44th overall, 2000; Mighty Ducks of Anaheim
- Playing career: 1999–2015

Ilya Nikolayevich Bryzgalov (/brɪsˈɡɑːlɒf/; Russian: Илья Николаевич Брызгалов; born 22 June 1980) is a Russian former professional ice hockey goaltender who played in the National Hockey League (NHL) for the Anaheim Ducks, Phoenix Coyotes, Philadelphia Flyers, Edmonton Oilers and Minnesota Wild. He was drafted by Anaheim in the second round of the 2000 NHL entry draft, 44th overall.

In 2006–07, Bryzgalov won the Stanley Cup with the Anaheim Ducks. Internationally, he has earned a bronze medal with Russia at the 2002 Winter Olympics, and a silver medal at the 2000 World Junior Championships. Bryzgalov also competed in the 2004 World Cup of Hockey and is a three-time Olympian. As the starting goaltender, he helped Russia win back-to-back gold medals at the 2009 World Ice Hockey Championships, making them ranked number one in the world. He was also runner-up for the Vezina Trophy and a top-five finalist for the Hart Memorial Trophy in the 2009–10 season.

== Playing career ==
=== Early years and Anaheim tenure ===
Bryzgalov started his professional career in his native Russia, splitting the 1999–2000 season between Spartak Moscow of the Russian Supreme League (RSL-2) and Lada Togliatti of the Russian Superleague (RSL). Bryzgalov played two seasons with Lada Togliatti before joining the Mighty Ducks of Anaheim, who had drafted him in the second round, 44th overall, in the 2000 NHL entry draft.

However, with Jean-Sébastien Giguère and Martin Gerber ahead of him in the club's depth chart, Bryzgalov spent the better part of his first four seasons in North America with the Cincinnati Mighty Ducks of the American Hockey League (AHL). He made his Mighty Ducks debut in 2001–02, playing in his first of two games during that four-season stretch.

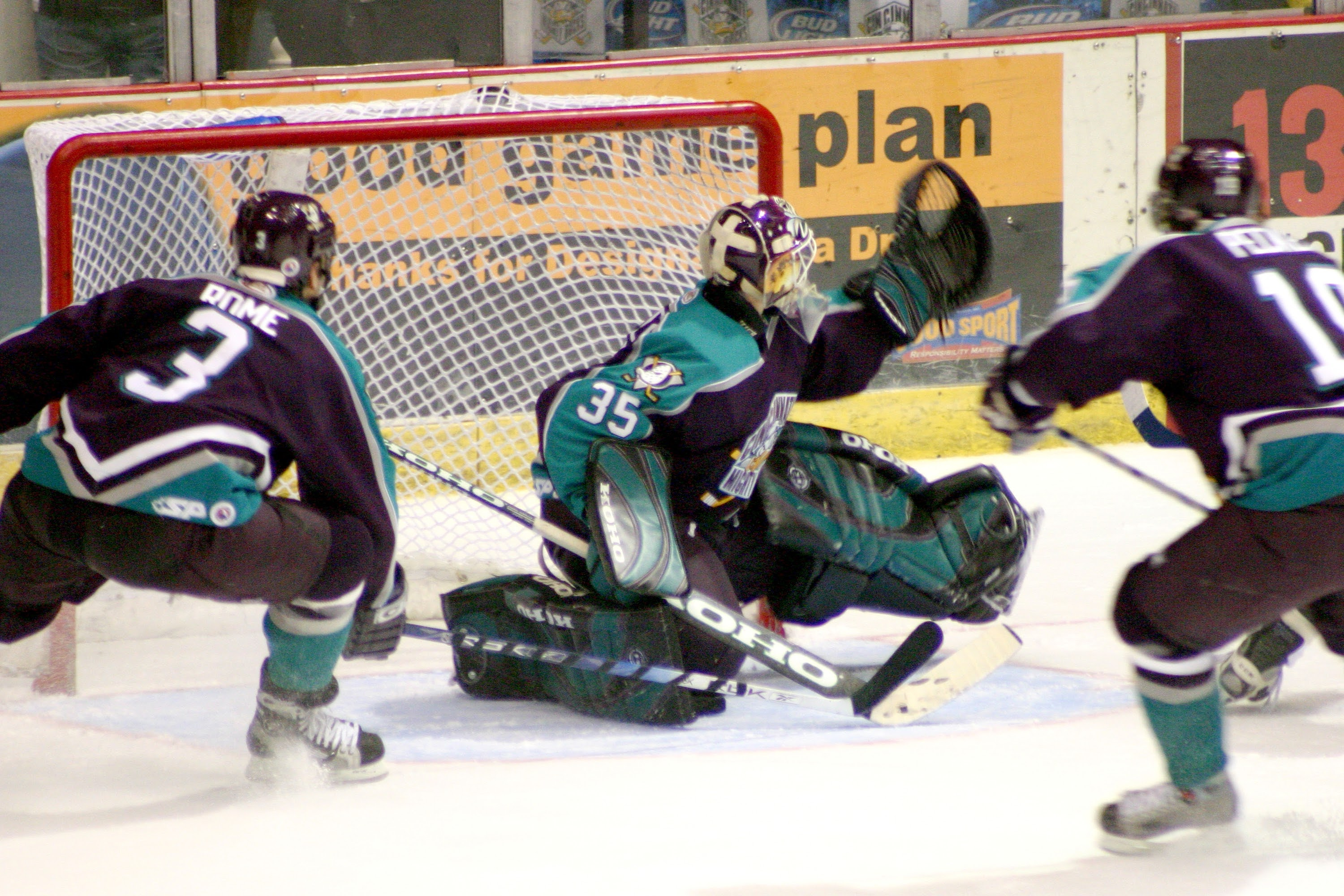
Bryzgalov playing for the Cincinnati Mighty Ducks in 2004.

With the departure of backup Gerber, Bryzgalov took over behind Giguère in 2005–06 season. However, injuries to the Ducks starter allowed Bryzgalov to play more games than he otherwise would have and he responded to the challenge with a 13–12–1 record with a 2.51 goals against average (GAA) and .910 save percentage. In the subsequent playoffs, Bryzgalov made three starts and one relief appearance for the Ducks in their first-round series against the Calgary Flames. In Game 1, he filled-in for an injured Giguère, taking a 2–1 overtime loss. He relieved Giguère once more in Game 5 and stopped all 19 shots he faced in a 3–2 loss. He then took over the starting job for Games 6 and 7 of the series, winning 2–1 in Game 6 and recording a shutout in the decisive Game 7. Moving past the Flames, Bryzgalov then recorded 5–0 and 3–0 shutouts in the first two games of the second series against the Colorado Avalanche for three consecutive shutouts. He tied Frank McCool's 1945 playoff record for most consecutive shutouts by a rookie and passed Giguère, who had recorded consecutive shutouts in 2003 for the third-longest playoff shutout streak of all time. Despite his success in the first two rounds, Bryzgalov struggled in the semifinals against the Edmonton Oilers and was eventually replaced by Giguère for the rest of the series as the Ducks were eliminated in five games.

Bryzgalov continued to play backup to Giguère the following season and into the 2007 playoffs. Bryzgalov made comments regarding Ducks head coach Randy Carlyle, saying he believed Carlyle had no confidence in him. However, he briefly took over as the starter for the first four games of the Western Conference Quarterfinals, winning three games as Giguère took a leave of absence with personal issues. Bryzgalov came in for relief in the Western Conference finals against the Detroit Red Wings, but remained on the bench as the Ducks went on to defeat the Ottawa Senators in the Finals in five games to win the franchise's, and Bryzgalov's, first Stanley Cup.

=== Phoenix Coyotes ===
With the re-signing of Giguère to a four-year contract in the off-season and the acquisition of Jonas Hiller from Switzerland, the Ducks attempted to trade Bryzgalov, but were unable to do so. Anaheim general manager Brian Burke claimed he had a deal worked out at the 2007 NHL entry draft, but could not finish it. As a result, on 16 November 2007, Bryzgalov was placed on waivers and claimed by the Phoenix Coyotes the following day, on 17 November. In his first game with the team that same day, Bryzgalov made 27 saves for his third career shutout in a 1–0 win over the Los Angeles Kings. Phoenix promptly signed him to a three-year contract extension and he went on to record 26 wins in 55 games for the Coyotes as they battled for a playoff spot, establishing himself as the club's starting goaltender.

Bryzgalov again recorded 26 wins for the Coyotes during the 2008–09 season, though the Coyotes did not qualify for the playoffs. But the 2009–10 season would be a different story for Bryzgalov and the Coyotes, who would qualify for the playoffs for the first time since 2002 on the back of Bryzgalov's 42 victories. The fourth-seeded Coyotes would face-off against the veteran Detroit Red Wings in the Western Conference Quarterfinals. The series proved to be a see-saw battle that eventually saw Detroit prevail in seven games. Bryzgalov averaged 3.43 goals against per game during the series.

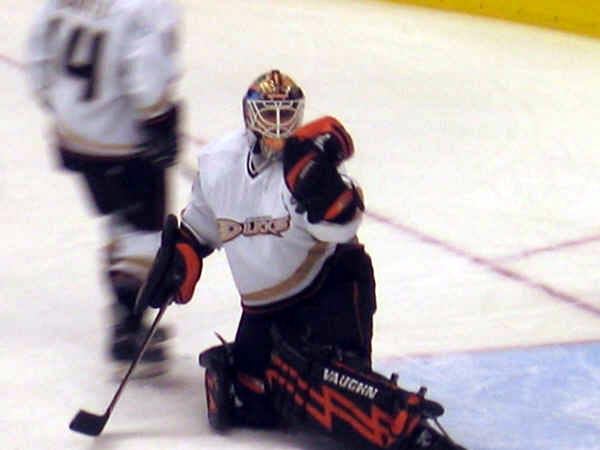
Bryzgalov warming up during the 2007 playoffs.

Despite the uncertainty surrounding the Coyotes during the 2010–11 season, Bryzgalov's 36 wins helped them to the sixth seed in the Western Conference and a return trip to the playoffs. Once again, the Coyotes faced the Red Wings. Despite Bryzgalov's strong play throughout the regular season, he struggled in the playoff rematch with Detroit, averaging 4.36 goals against per game as the Red Wings swept the Coyotes in four straight games. Set to become an unrestricted free agent in the off-season, the Coyotes did not meet Bryzgalov's asking price for a contract extension. On 6 June 2011, Bryzgalov's negotiation rights were traded to the Philadelphia Flyers for a third-round pick in the 2012 NHL entry draft, forward Matt Clackson and future considerations. Bryzgalov averaged 33 victories a season the past four seasons with the Coyotes.

=== Philadelphia Flyers ===
During the previous two seasons, the Flyers had lacked a player who consistently filled the starting goaltender position. The duo of Michael Leighton and Brian Boucher were able to help the team to the 2010 Stanley Cup Finals in place of the injured starter Ray Emery, but neither goaltender held onto the starting position for an extended period of time. Rookie Sergei Bobrovsky was the Flyers' starter in the 2010–11 season, but he and Boucher formed another tandem with similar inconsistency, including a dismal playoff for both.

On 23 June 2011, the Flyers signed Bryzgalov to be their new starter, and signed him to a nine-year, $51 million contract. In order to accommodate his contract under the team's salary cap, the Flyers made two high-profile trades an hour before the Bryzgalov signing was first reported, sending Jeff Carter to the Columbus Blue Jackets (for Jakub Voráček, as well as first- and third-round picks in the 2011 Entry Draft) and captain Mike Richards to the Los Angeles Kings (for Wayne Simmonds, Brayden Schenn and a second-round pick).

On 27 October 2011, following a 9–8 loss to the Winnipeg Jets, Bryzgalov commented on his own play: "I have zero confidence in myself right now." He also likened himself to somebody "lost in the woods" and that, "If you probably throw a ball instead of the puck, I'm not gonna stop it." Bryzgalov would quickly rebound, however, by winning six of his next eight games.

Bryzgalov would become well known for his comments regarding the universe during the filming of HBO's 24/7 series – "Solar system is so humongous big, right? But if you see the, like, our solar system and our galaxy on the, like, on the side, you know, like, and we're so small — you can never see it — our galaxy is like huge, but if you see the big picture, our galaxy, like, it's small, tiny, like dot in the universe. Like, and I think like, 'And we have some problems here on the Earth we worry about?' Compared to like... nothing. Just... be happy. Don't worry, be happy right now." His comments have resulted in some good fun, including how when requesting information about the universe, Siri instead returns information about Bryzgalov, referring to him as "Mr. Universe".

Bryzgalov made news when he said he believed Sergei Bobrovsky would be the starter for the 2012 NHL Winter Classic: "I have great news and even better news. Okay, great news is I'm not playing, and better news is we have a chance to win the game... [I'll] make sure I don't forget my thermos with some nice tea and enjoy the bench," he said. Bobrovsky then started the Winter Classic on 2 January 2012, a 3–2 Flyers loss to the New York Rangers at Citizens Bank Park.

Following a 6–4 loss to the Pittsburgh Penguins on 18 February 2012, Bryzgalov was quoted as saying, "I know I was frustrated in my game today and I know I have to be better and I will continue to work on this, but ... I will try to find peace in my soul to play in this city."

From 4 to 13 March 2012, Bryzgalov recorded four shutouts and allowed just two goals over a five-game span. Two days later, on 15 March, Bryzgalov set the Flyers all-time record for longest shutout streak, in a game against the New York Islanders.

Bryzgalov was named the NHL's First Star of the Month for March 2012.

On 8 May 2012, the Flyers and Bryzgalov recorded a 3–1 loss to the New Jersey Devils, and were eliminated in the second round of the 2012 Stanley Cup playoffs. He recorded a 3.46 goals against average combined with an .887 save percentage during the playoffs.

On 2 March 2013, he won his 200th career game, a 2–1 win against the Ottawa Senators.

On 25 June 2013, Bryzgalov was informed the Flyers would use a compliance buyout to buy the remaining seven years on his contract.

=== Las Vegas Wranglers ===
On 2 October 2013, Bryzgalov signed a try-out contract with the Las Vegas Wranglers of the ECHL. According to the ECHL website, Bryzgalov was signed as an emergency backup goaltender by the Wranglers on 17 October 2013. He would be released two weeks later, on 16 October, without ever playing a game for the Wranglers.

=== Edmonton Oilers ===
On 8 November 2013, Bryzgalov entered a verbal agreement to sign a one-year contract with the Edmonton Oilers. He began on a conditioning assignment with the Edmonton's AHL affiliate, the Oklahoma City Barons, but was finally called up to the Oilers on 17 November. On 28 November, Bryzgalov made his first start of the season with a 3–0 shutout win over the Nashville Predators, stopping all 33 shots. After coming in a relief role the previous night, Bryzgalov posted his 31st career shutout. Head coach Dallas Eakins said after the game, "And he picked up right where he left off last game. I thought he was solid. He looked big in the net, everything. Check marks right across the page for him." Starting goaltender Devan Dubnyk sat as Bryzgalov's backup for the night. However, Bryzgalov was injured only two games later, temporarily halting his bid to supplant Dubnyk to become the Oilers' starter. However, Dubnyk was then traded to Nashville in January, which made Bryzgalov Edmonton's new starter until he was traded.

=== Minnesota Wild ===
On 4 March 2014, Bryzgalov was traded to the Minnesota Wild in exchange for a fourth-round draft pick. He played well for the Wild down the stretch, posting a 7–1–3 record, and he shared playing time with goaltender Darcy Kuemper in the 2014 playoffs. The Wild defeated the Colorado Avalanche in the first round but lost to the Chicago Blackhawks in round two. Bryzgalov became an unrestricted free agent at the conclusion of the season.

=== Return to Anaheim ===
On 3 December 2014, Bryzgalov signed a tryout contract with the Anaheim Ducks, the team for which he played from 2001 to 2008. After a successful tryout, the Ducks signed him to a one-year deal reportedly worth $2.88 million on 9 December 2014.

On 23 February 2015, the Ducks placed Bryzgalov on waivers and he was assigned to their AHL affiliate, the Norfolk Admirals, after fighting for the Ducks' third-string position with Jason LaBarbera. However, on 26 February, the Ducks put Bryzgalov on unconditional waivers, normally an indication a team is about to release a player. Shortly after, the Ducks made a public statement saying Bryzgalov would be returning home to his family and not finish the 2014–15 season with them, ending his professional career.

== International play ==
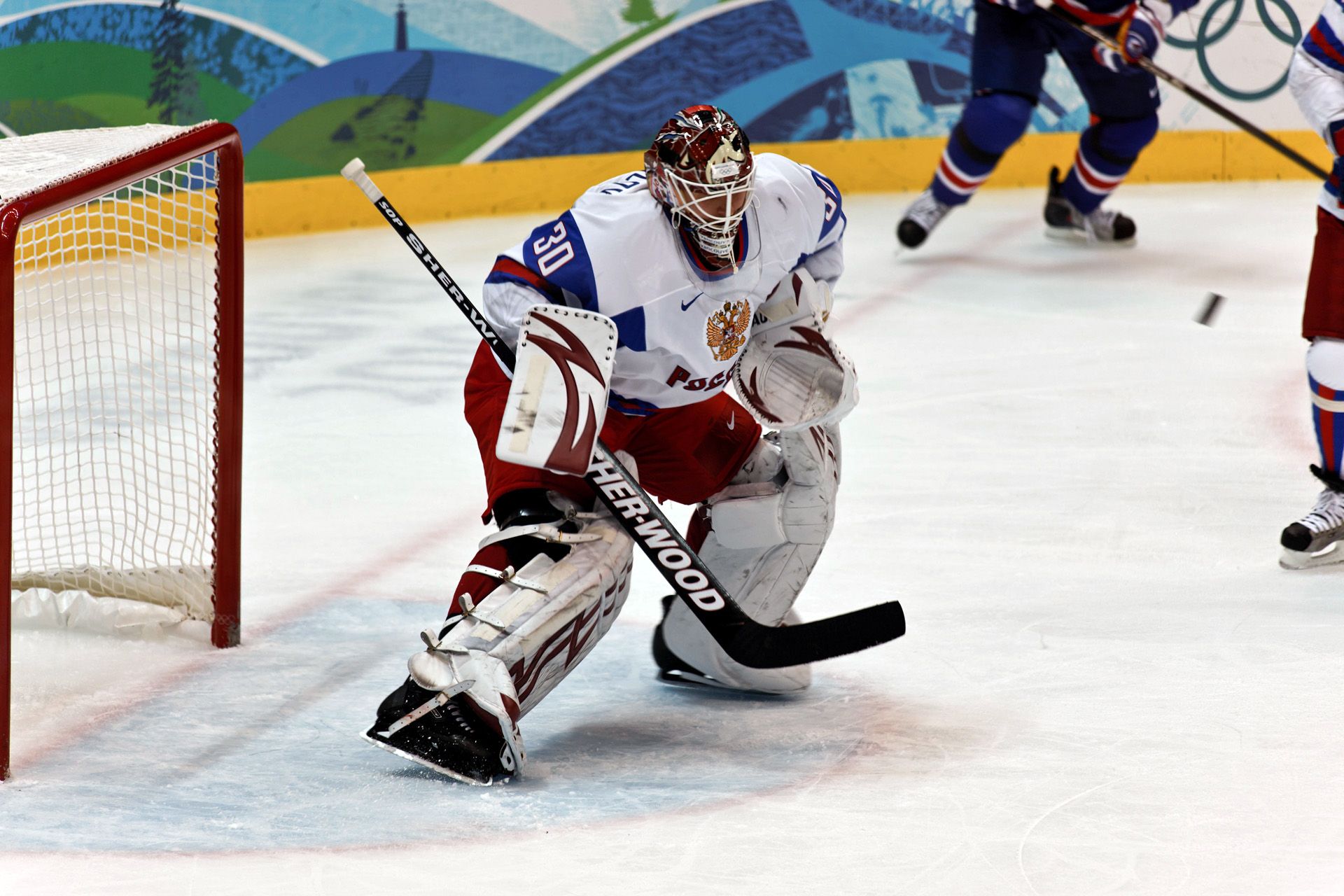

Medal record

Representing Russia

Ice hockey

World Championship
Gold medal – first place	2009 Bern	

Winter Olympics
Bronze medal – third place	2002 Salt Lake City	

World Junior Championships
Silver medal – second place	2000 Umeå	

Bryzgalov competed for Russia in the 2000 World Junior Championships in Umeå. He recorded a 0.77 GAA in four games to help Russia to a silver medal. Later that year, he was named to the Russia's senior team for the 2000 World Championships, where he played in four games as Russia failed to reach the podium. Two years later, he competed for Russia at the 2002 Winter Olympics in Salt Lake City, earning bronze. Playing in a backup position, Bryzgalov did not appear in any games.

However, Bryzgalov played in a more expanded role at the 2004 World Cup of Hockey, playing in 240 minutes and recording a 2.34 GAA in three games. Bryzgalov received his first international gold medal at the 2009 World Championships after defeating Canada in the final.

== In popular culture ==
A 2006 post game interview given by Bryzgalov while he was a member of the Anaheim Ducks has become an internet meme. He was asked by a reporter how he felt about Ducks teammate Chris Pronger who joined the Ducks after a controversial departure from the Edmonton Oilers, and Bryzgalov answered "Is only game[sic], why you heff to be mad?" in an unusual high-pitched voice, with his characteristically thick Russian accent. The quotation was included in the game Overwatch as a voice line spoken by the character Zarya, who is Russian. Overwatch lead writer Michael Chu explains that many of the development team are hockey fans, and he himself was introduced to hockey after watching the Disney film, The Mighty Ducks.

== Personal life ==
Bryzgalov and his wife, Yevgeniya, have a daughter, Valery, and a son, Vladislav. The family lived in Yorba Linda, California, during Bryzgalov's tenure with the Anaheim Ducks. He spent five summers attending college in Russia, where he earned his degree, allowing him to teach and coach in Russian schools. He reads books and enjoys studying philosophy. Bryzgalov once owned a Siberian Husky, a breed of dog he considers very beautiful. In HBO's 24/7 Flyers/Rangers: Road to the NHL Winter Classic series, he compared his dog to a "hot blonde girl".

== Career statistics ==
=== Regular season and playoffs ===
			Regular season										Playoffs
Season	Team	League	GP	W	L	T	OTL	MIN	GA	SO	GAA	SV%	GP	W	L	MIN	GA	SO	GAA	SV%
1996–97	Lada–2 Togliatti	RUS.3	5	—	—	—	—	—	—	—	—	—	—	—	—	—	—	—	—	—
1997–98	Lada–2 Togliatti	RUS.3	8	—	—	—	—	480	28	—	3.50	—	—	—	—	—	—	—	—	—
1998–99	Lada–2 Togliatti	RUS.4	20	—	—	—	—	1200	43	—	2.15	—	—	—	—	—	—	—	—	—
1999–2000	Spartak–2 Moscow	RUS.2	9	—	—	—	—	500	21	—	2.52	—	—	—	—	—	—	—	—	—
1999–2000	Lada Togliatti	RSL	14	—	—	—	—	796	18	3	1.36	.930	7	—	—	407	10	1	1.47	—
1999–2000	Lada–2 Togliatti	RUS.3	2	—	—	—	—	—	—	—	2.50	—	—	—	—	—	—	—	—	—
2000–01	Lada Togliatti	RSL	34	—	—	—	—	1992	61	8	1.84	.922	5	—	—	249	8	0	1.93	.932
2001–02	Cincinnati Mighty Ducks	AHL	45	20	16	4	—	2399	99	4	2.48	.916	—	—	—	—	—	—	—	—
2001–02	Mighty Ducks of Anaheim	NHL	1	0	0	0	—	32	1	0	1.88	.917	—	—	—	—	—	—	—	—
2002–03	Cincinnati Mighty Ducks	AHL	54	12	26	9	—	3020	142	1	2.82	.910	—	—	—	—	—	—	—	—
2003–04	Cincinnati Mighty Ducks	AHL	64	27	25	10	—	3748	145	6	2.32	.919	9	5	4	536	27	1	3.02	.909
2003–04	Mighty Ducks of Anaheim	NHL	1	1	0	0	—	60	2	0	2.00	.929	—	—	—	—	—	—	—	—
2004–05	Cincinnati Mighty Ducks	AHL	36	17	13	1	—	2007	87	4	2.60	.902	7	3	3	314	13	0	2.48	.904
2005–06	Mighty Ducks of Anaheim	NHL	31	13	12	—	1	1575	66	1	2.51	.910	11	6	4	659	16	3	1.46	.944
2006–07	Anaheim Ducks	NHL	27	10	8	—	6	1509	62	1	2.47	.907	5	3	1	267	10	0	2.25	.922
2007–08	Anaheim Ducks	NHL	9	2	3	—	1	447	19	0	2.55	.909	—	—	—	—	—	—	—	—
2007–08	Phoenix Coyotes	NHL	55	26	22	—	5	3167	128	3	2.43	.921	—	—	—	—	—	—	—	—
2008–09	Phoenix Coyotes	NHL	65	26	31	—	6	3760	187	3	2.98	.906	—	—	—	—	—	—	—	—
2009–10	Phoenix Coyotes	NHL	69	42	20	—	6	4084	156	8	2.29	.920	7	3	4	419	24	0	3.44	.906
2010–11	Phoenix Coyotes	NHL	68	36	20	—	10	4060	168	7	2.48	.921	4	0	4	234	17	0	4.36	.879
2011–12	Philadelphia Flyers	NHL	59	33	16	—	7	3415	141	6	2.48	.909	11	5	6	642	37	0	3.46	.887
2012–13	CSKA Moscow	KHL	12	6	5	—	0	647	23	0	2.13	.913	—	—	—	—	—	—	—	—
2012–13	Philadelphia Flyers	NHL	40	19	17	—	3	2298	107	1	2.79	.900	—	—	—	—	—	—	—	—
2013–14	Oklahoma City Barons	AHL	2	1	1	—	0	119	6	0	3.03	.880	—	—	—	—	—	—	—	—
2013–14	Edmonton Oilers	NHL	20	5	8	—	5	1135	57	1	3.01	.908	—	—	—	—	—	—	—	—
2013–14	Minnesota Wild	NHL	12	7	1	—	3	679	24	3	2.12	.911	9	3	6	479	21	1	2.63	.885
2014–15	Norfolk Admirals	AHL	2	1	1	—	0	119	5	0	2.53	.915	—	—	—	—	—	—	—	—
2014–15	Anaheim Ducks	NHL	8	1	4	—	1	329	23	0	4.19	.847	—	—	—	—	—	—	—	—
KHL totals			12	6	5	—	0	647	23	0	2.13	.913	—	—	—	—	—	—	—	—
NHL totals			465	221	162	0	54	26,550	1,141	34	2.58	.912	47	20	25	2,700	125	4	2.78	.905

=== International ===
Year	Team	Event	Result	GP	W	L	T	MIN	GA	SO	GAA	SV%
2000	Russia	WJC	2nd place, silver medalist(s)	4				234	3	1	0.77	.971
2000	Russia	WC	11th	4				218	10	0	2.75	.880
2002	Russia	OG	3rd place, bronze medalist(s)	DNP	—	—	—	—	—	—	—	—
2004	Russia	WCH	5th	3	2	1	0	180	7	0	2.33	.897
2006	Russia	OG	4th	1	0	1	0	60	5	0	5.00	.861
2009	Russia	WC	1st place, gold medalist(s)	7	7	0	—	404	14	1	2.09	.929
2010	Russia	OG	6th	2	0	1	—	101	3	0	1.78	.942
2013	Russia	WC	6th	4	3	1	—	218	8	1	2.20	.901
Junior totals				4	—	—	—	234	3	1	0.77	.971
Senior totals				21	—	—	—	1181	47	2	2.39	.908

== Awards and achievements ==
Award	Year
NHL
Stanley Cup (Anaheim Ducks)	2007
Second All-Star Team	2010

== Transactions ==
- 24 June 2000 — Drafted by the Mighty Ducks of Anaheim in the second round, 44th overall.
- 17 November 2007 — Claimed off waivers by the Phoenix Coyotes from the Anaheim Ducks.
- 7 June 2011 — Traded to the Philadelphia Flyers for Matt Clackson, a third-round draft pick in 2012 and a conditional draft pick.
- 23 June 2011 — Signed a nine-year, $51 million deal with the Philadelphia Flyers.
- 26 June 2013 — Remaining seven years on his contract bought out by the Philadelphia Flyers.
- 8 November 2013 — Signed a one-year, $2 million deal with the Edmonton Oilers.
- 4 March 2014 — Traded to the Minnesota Wild for a fourth-round draft pick in 2014.
- 9 December 2014 — Signed a one-year, $2.88 million deal with the Anaheim Ducks.
