= Roman Neumayer =

Austrian and German ice hockey executive (died 2015)

- Born: 1930/1931; Bukovina, Romania
- Died: 23/24 December 2015 (aged 84); Olching, Germany
- Known for: Director for the International Ice Hockey Federation and the German Ice Hockey Federation
- Awards: Paul Loicq Award; German Ice Hockey Hall of Fame

Roman Neumayer (1930/1931 – 23/24 December 2015) was an Austrian and German ice hockey executive. He served as the sport director of the German Ice Hockey Federation from 1970 to 1986, and as technical director for the International Ice Hockey Federation from 1986 to 1996. He received the Paul Loicq Award for services to international ice hockey, and was inducted into the German Ice Hockey Hall of Fame.

== Early life ==
Neumayer was born in 1930 or 1931, (Note: Neumayer was reported to be 59 years old as of 6 August 1990. (Born in 1930 or 1931) Neumayer was reported to be 84 years old as of 23 December 2015. (Born in 1930 or 1931)) in the historical region of Bukovina in the Kingdom of Romania. He began in ice hockey as a player, then a hockey coach and hockey referee in Czechoslovakia, before his defection to Austria in 1963. In a 1990 interview, he stated that defecting was the best decision he ever made. He continued to coach hockey in Austria, and became a tennis coach.

== Hockey in West Germany ==
Neumayer served as the sport director of the German Ice Hockey Federation from 1970 to 1986. As of 1976, the German Ice Sport Federation oversaw ice hockey, in addition to figure skating, speed skating, and curling. Neumayer had 30 teams to choose players for the West Germany men's national team, which was headquartered at Füssen. Neumayer had traveled with the West Germany men's national team on a tour of Canada in 1973, and was the team's manager in 1976 when they won their only Olympic medal.

Coach Xaver Unsinn led Germany to a bronze medal in ice hockey at the 1976 Winter Olympics based on a better goal differential than the Finland men's national team. The "Miracle of Innsbruck" team were all amateurs, and defeated the United States men's national team by a 4–1 score in their final game of the Olympic tournament. Neumayer arranged a nine-game tour in Canada following the 1976 Winter Olympics. He sought higher-level international competition, but was disappointed with the calibre of the junior ice hockey teams played from the Saskatchewan Junior Hockey League and Alberta Junior Hockey League.

In 1978, Neumayer as manager arranged a tour of Alaska for the national team, splitting the players into two groups with exhibition games for each. In preparation for ice hockey at the 1980 Winter Olympics, Neumayer he arranged exhibition games versus the Adirondack Red Wings, University of Vermont, and Cornell University. The average age of players on the 1980 Olympics team was 21.5 years, drawing from the top tier of the Eishockey-Bundesliga, which scheduled a break to allow its players to complete in the Olympics.

In December 1980, Neumayer spoke out against teams in West German professional leagues stacking their rosters with more than the two allowed foreigner-born players, resulting in the West German Ice Hockey Federation suspending 50 players with invalid passports from German consulates in Canada.

== International Ice Hockey Federation ==
From 1986 to 1996, Neumayer served as the technical director for the International Ice Hockey Federation (IIHF). As the technical director, he was an ex-officio member of all IIHF committees and acted in an advisory role to the respective chair of the committee. He attended an international symposium on refereeing in hockey arranged by the Canadian Amateur Hockey Association in 1987, where discussion included consistency in the interpretation of rules, and dealing with on-ice violence. He helped investigate doping in sport in co-operation with the IIHF medical committee, and attended the Goodwill Games.

Neumayer felt that development of women's ice hockey was uneven since only a few nations played at a quality level, but was optimistic for the potential inclusion of women's hockey in the Winter Olympics as of 1998. In commenting about the 1992 IIHF Women's World Championship, he felt that China's play was a pleasant surprise and hoped it would encourage growth in the sport within Asia. After retiring from the IIHF, Neumayer remained in a technical advisory role at the 1998 Winter Olympics in Nagano, Japan, and served as chairman of other IIHF tournaments.

== German and IIHF halls of fame ==
In 1988, Neumayer and Horst Eckert co-founded the German Ice Hockey Museum and German Ice Hockey Hall of Fame. The exhibits toured German cities including Garmisch-Partenkirchen, Mannheim, and Landshut until 1993; and were displayed during the 1993 Men's Ice Hockey World Championships in Munich. The exhibits were stored in Füssen until 1999, when Neumayer suggested a permanent museum in Augsburg. The IIHF since declared it was one of the four best ice hockey museums in Europe.

In 1990, Neumayer helped negotiate a deal with representatives from Kingston, Ontario, to display IIHF memorabilia at the International Hockey Hall of Fame, and sought to make North American people aware of the history of ice hockey in Europe. He considered Kingston an ideal location for the proposed IIHF Hall of Fame, since like the city focused on amateur hockey similar to Europe rather than professional hockey. In 1993, he delivered more than 4,000 items to the International Hockey Hall of Fame in Kingston.

== Later hockey career and honors ==
Neumayer received the Paul Loicq Award in 1999, in recognition for his service to the IIHF and promoting ice hockey worldwide. Two years later, he was honored with induction into the German Ice Hockey Hall of Fame in 2001. Franz Reindl, the president of the German Ice Hockey Federation, said Neumayer was an outstanding and formative personality who had a significant leadership role in winning the bronze medal during the 1976 Winter Olympic Games.

In 2003, Neumayer and team executives from the Augsburger Panther assisted in founding the Windhoek Lions as the first ice hockey team in Namibia. The Panthers donated jerseys and ice hockey equipment. Neumayer assisted in the planned construction of an arena, and used his connections to convince Bernd Haake from Germany to coach the team and set up a training camp playing against teams in South Africa.

== Personal life ==
Neumayer resided in Vienna as of 1990, and was fluent in six languages. He died during the night from the 23 to 24 December 2015, at age 84 in Olching, Germany.
