= Düsseldorfer EG =

- City: Düsseldorf, Germany
- League: DEL2
- Founded: 1935
- Home arena: ISS Dome (capacity: 13,400)
- Colors
- Owner: Harald Wirtz
- Head coach: Steven Reinprecht
- Captain: Philip Gogulla
- Website: deg-eishockey.de

Franchise history
- 1935–2002: Düsseldorfer EG
- 2002–2012: DEG Metro Stars
- 2012–: Düsseldorfer EG

Düsseldorfer Eislauf-Gemeinschaft or Düsseldorfer EG (DEG) is a German professional ice hockey team in Düsseldorf. It was Germany's most successful hockey club for a long time and had many international players. The famous Eisstadion at the Brehmstrasse was the home venue for most of the team's history. The team now plays in the DEL2 (Deutsche Eishockey Liga 2); the home venue is the PSD Bank Dome.

The club was founded on 8 November 1935 as Düsseldorfer Eislauf Gemeinschaft (DEG) and was renamed DEG Metro Stars on 1 March 2002. It was renamed again as Düsseldorfer Eislauf-Gemeinschaft (DEG) in 2012.

== Honors ==
- German champions 1967, 1972, 1975, 1990, 1991, 1992, 1993, 1996
- German runner-up, 1969, 1971, 1973, 1980, 1981, 1986, 1989, 1994, 2006, 2009
- DEB-Pokal winners 2006
- DEB-Pokal runner-up, 2005
- NRW state champion 1946
- Champion in the 2. Bundesliga 2000 (the DEG was two years in the 2nd division due to financial problems)
- 2nd place in Eurocup 1991
- 3rd place in Eurocup 1997
- Beat the NHL BLUE ALL-STARS team 3–1 in the first cross-league game in the team's history.

== Players ==
=== Current roster ===
Updated 11 April 2025.

No.	Nat	Player	Pos	S/G	Age	Acquired	Birthplace
7	(Germany)	Sinan Akdag	D	L	36	2023	Rosenheim, Germany
94	(Canada)	Tyler Angle	C	L	25	2024	Niagara Falls, Ontario, Canada
81	(Germany)	Torsten Ankert	D	R	38	2023	Essen, Germany
58	(Canada)	Max Balinson	D	L	29	2024	Ancaster, Ontario, Canada
17	(Germany)	Lenny Boos	F	R	19	2024	Cologne, Germany
92	(Germany)	Jakub Borzecki	RW	R	24	2022	Syracuse, New York, United States
18	(Germany)	Laurin Braun	LW	L	35	2024	Lampertheim, Germany
16	(Canada)	Kyle Cumiskey	D	L	39	2020	Abbotsford, British Columbia, Canada
67	(Germany)	Bernhard Ebner	D	L	35	2012	Schongau, Germany
93	(Canada)	Tyler Gaudet	C	L	33	2024	Hamilton, Ontario, Canada
87	(Germany)	Philip Gogulla (C)	LW	L	38	2022	Düsseldorf, Germany
40	(Norway)	Henrik Haukeland	G	L	31	2022	Fredrikstad, Norway
35	(Germany)	Leon Hümer	G	L	21	2024	Büdingen, Germany
3	(United States)	Alec McCrea	D	R	31	2022	San Diego, California, United States
8	(United States)	Ryan McKiernan	D	R	36	2024	White Plains, New York, United States
22	(Germany)	Oliver Mebus	D	L	33	2023	Dormagen, Germany
21	(Canada)	Brendan O'Donnell	LW	L	34	2021	Winnipeg, Manitoba, Canada
44	(United States)	Jacob Pivonka	C	L	26	2024	Olathe, Kansas, United States
4	(Canada)	Paul Postma	D	R	37	2024	Red Deer, Alberta, Canada
33	(Germany)	Nikita Quapp	G	L	23	2024	Ravensburg, Germany
14	(United States)	Justin Richards	C	R	28	2024	Orlando, Florida, United States
72	(Germany)	Bennet Roßmy	LW	L	22	2023	Zittau, Germany
86	(United States)	Drake Rymsha	C	R	27	2024	Huntington Woods, Michigan, United States
9	(Canada)	Rick Schofield	C	L	39	2024	Pickering, Ontario, Canada
42	(Germany)	Luis Üffing	F	L	26	2023	Peißenberg, Germany

=== Honored members ===
- 10 Chris Valentine
- 12 Peter-John Lee
- 13 Walter Köberle
- 23 Daniel Kreutzer

=== Coaches ===
- 1930s – Bobby Bell
- 1952–53 – Rainer Hillmann
- 1950s – Clare (Jimmy) Drake
- 1950s – Gerald Strong
- 1956–58 – Frank Trottier
- 1958–62 – Vlastimil Suchoparek
- 1962–65 – Engelbert Holderied
- 1965–69 – Hans Rampf
- 1969–70 – Dr. Ladislav Horsky
- 1970–72 – Xaver Unsinn
- 1972–73 – Jiri Pokorny
- 1973–76 – Chuck Holdaway
- 1976–77 – Hans Rampf
- 1977 – George Agar
- 1977–78 – Rudi Hejtmanek
- 1978–79 – Otto Schneitberger
- 1979–82 – Gerhard Kießling
- 1982–83 – Jaromir Frycer
- 1983–84 – Heinz Weisenbach
- 1984–87 – Otto Schneitberger
- 1987–88 – Brian Lefley
- 1988–89 – Peter Johannson
- 1989–90 – Peter Hejma
- 1990–95 – Hans Zach
- 1995–97 – Hardy Nilsson
- 1997 – Hans Zach
- 1997–98 – Chris Valentine
- 1998–99 – Czeslaw Panek
- 1999–01 – Gerhard Brunner
- 2001–04 – Michael Komma
- 2004 – Walter Köberle
- 2004–05 – Butch Goring
- 2005–07 – Don Jackson
- 2007 – Slavomir Lener
- 2007–08 – Lance Nethery
- 2008–10 – Harold Kreis
- 2010–12 – Jeff Tomlinson
- 2012–14 – Christian Brittig
- 2014–17 – Christoph Kreutzer
- 2017–18 – Mike Pellegrims
- 2018 – Tobias Abstreiter
- 2018–22 – Harold Kreis
- 2022–23 – Roger Hansson
- 2023–present – Thomas Dolak
