= Heinz Henschel =

German ice hockey player and sports administrator (1920–2006)

- Born: 27 January 1920; Berlin, Germany
- Died: 21 October 2006 (aged 86); Berlin, Germany
- Occupation: Banker
- Known for: Sports administration
- Awards: IIHF Hall of Fame; German Ice Hockey Hall of Fame
Ice hockey career
- Position: Forward
- Played for: Berliner Schlittschuhclub & others
- Playing career: 1932–1956

Heinz Henschel (27 January 1920 – 21 October 2006) was a German ice hockey player, sports administrator, and banker. He played for 24 seasons and won two German championships as a member of the Berliner Schlittschuhclub. He later became a banker involved in sports and entertainment. He was the founder of multiple sporting associations and served as president of the German Ice Sport Federation. He was the leader of German delegations at Winter Olympic Games and a member of the German Olympic Sports Confederation. His career was recognized by induction into both the IIHF Hall of Fame and the German Ice Hockey Hall of Fame.

== Early life ==
Henschel was born 27 January 1920 in Berlin, Germany. He attended the gymnasium in Lankwitz, began playing ice hockey at age nine, then organized a student team at the school by age ten.

== Career ==
Henschel played the forward position in his ice hockey career, which lasted 24 seasons from 1932 to 1956 and included two national championships as a member of the Berliner Schlittschuhclub. Other clubs he played for included Berliner EV 1898, LTTC Red-White Berlin, Prussia Berlin, and SC Brandenburg.

Henschel also had a career as a banker. He was forced to close his bank in Steglitz due to investment losses in the Berlin Sportpalast. He was unable to revive his former home arena as a profitable entertainment venue, and had amassed debt due to borrowing more than a half million Deutsche Marks in a five-year lease.

Henschel later turned his efforts towards hockey diplomacy and sports administration. He attended the 1947 Ice Hockey World Championships and was successful in negotiating the return of the German Ice Hockey Association into the International Ice Hockey Federation (IIHF) membership, and also the Germany men's national ice hockey team's participation in future Ice Hockey World Championships. He later negotiated the entry of the German Ice Hockey Federation into the IIHF to represent West Germany.

Henschel helped establish several associations to oversee sports in Berlin and in Germany. He was involved in setting up the Berlin Ice Sport Federation, the Berlin Regional Sport Federation, the German Ice Sport Federation, and the German Ice Hockey Federation. He served as president of the German Ice Sport Federation from 1963 to 1988, was president of the German Ice Sports Federation from 1992 and 1994, and also served as an executive member of the German Sports Federation (GSF). As a member of the GSF, he was a founder of the German Ice Hockey Museum.

Henschel was the chief organizer of the 1983 World Ice Hockey Championships hosted by West Germany. In 2003, he organized the 20th anniversary of the game between the West German team and East German team at the 1983 championships at the Westfalenhallen in Dortmund. Regarding the event, he said that "the game is intended to express the memory and joy that today we all belong to one federation and after the match we will spend a cozy evening together".

Henschel was the leader of the German delegations at eight Winter Olympic Games, and the national team at 27 Ice Hockey World Championships. As a member of the German Olympic Sports Confederation, he acted as Chef de Mission for West Germany at the 1984 Winter Olympics.

== Later life and honors ==
Henschel was inducted into the IIHF Hall of Fame in 2003, in the builder category, and was also inducted into German Ice Hockey Hall of Fame. He was made an honorary member of the German Ice Hockey Federation, the German Ice Sport Federation, and the Berlin Ice Sport Association.

Henschel died on 21 October 2006 in Berlin.
