= Duanne Moeser =

Canadian-German ice hockey player and manager

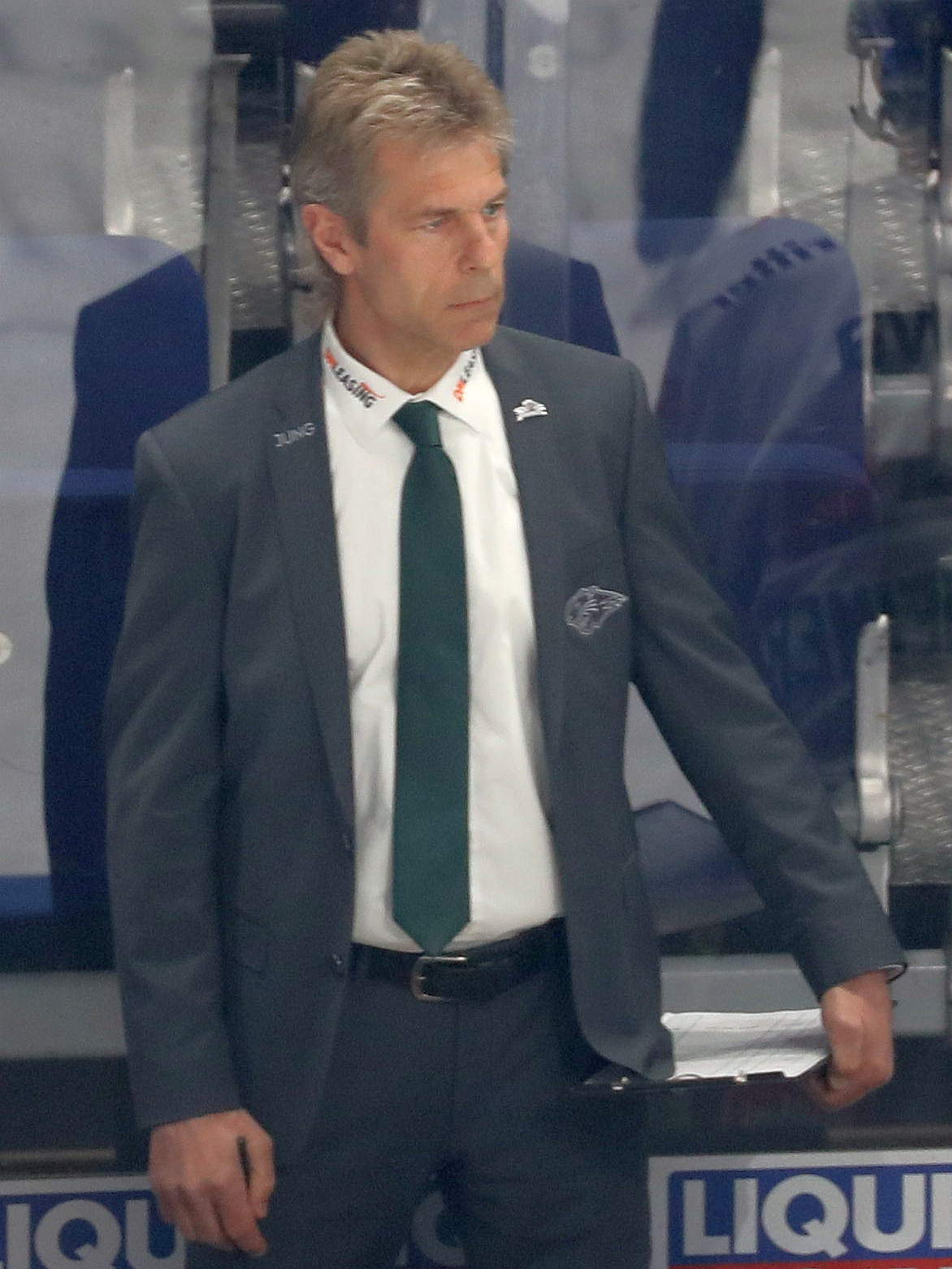
- Born: April 3, 1963 (age 61); Waterloo, Ontario, Canada
- Height: 5 ft 10 in (178 cm)
- Weight: 171 lb (78 kg; 12 st 3 lb)
- Position: Forward
- Shot: Left
- Played for: New Haven Nighthawks; Erie Golden Blades; Flint Spirits; Starbulls Rosenheim; Eisbären Berlin; Augsburger Panther
- NHL draft: Undrafted
- Playing career: 1986–2005

Duanne Moeser (born April 3, 1963) is a Canadian-German former professional ice hockey player. He is a member of the German ice hockey hall of fame.

== Playing career ==
Moeser attended Cornell University from 1982 to 1986, serving as team captain his junior and senior year, while winning multiple awards and accomplishments. In 1987, Moeser landed his first contract in Germany, signing with ERC Sonthofen, where he stayed until 1989.

Moeser then played 15 seasons with the Augsburger Panther, interrupted by stints at EC Kassel, Eisbären Berlin, EA Kempten and Starbulls Rosenheim, and is Augsburg's team's all-time leading scorer. He had his jersey number 7 retired by the club.

== National team ==
Of German descent, Moeser received German citizenship during his career. In 1997, at the age of 34, he made his debut on the German Men's National Team, and appeared in a total of four games for Germany.

== Coaching and managing career ==
After his playing career, Moeser served as the assistant coach of Augsburger Panther from 2005 to 2012 and was appointed the club's sport manager in 2012.

Following the 2024–25 season, Moeser stepped down as the Sports Manager however would remain within Augsburger with Markus Keller announcing his retirement to succeed Moeser at his request on 25 March 2025.

== Charity ==
Moeser and his wife Christine founded "7 x Sieben - Gemeinsam Stark Für Kinder", a charity organization to support children and young people in the city of Augsburg.

== Awards and honors ==
Award	Year
All-ECAC Hockey Second Team	1984–85

Cornell University:

- 1984: Cornell University Nicky Bawlf Award (Team Most Valuable Player)
- 1985: Joe DeLibero/Stan Tsapis Award (Presented for skilled efficiency, unselfish dedication, and hard-nosed competitive application)
- 1986: Ironman Award (Presented to the player showing determination to overcome injuries)
- 1986: Cornell Hockey Association Award (Presented to the player displaying enthusiasm, dedication, desire, and an unselfish willingness to give the team an extra ounce of energy)

Ivy League:

- 1983: All-Ivy Honorable Mention
- 1984: Co-Ivy Player of the Year, All-Ivy First Team
- 1985: All-Ivy First Team
- 1986: All-Ivy Second Team

Eastern College Athletic Conference

- 1986: Eastern College Athletic Conference Honorable Mention
