= Markus Keller =

Markus Keller may refer to:

- Markus Keller (triathlete) (born 1967), Swiss triathlete
- Markus Keller (ice hockey) (born 1989), German ice hockey goaltender
- Markus Keller (snowboarder) (born 1982), Swiss snowboarder
