= Sudanese People's Socialist Front =

The Sudanese People's Socialist Front was a Tripoli-based Sudanese opposition group, led by Abdullah Zakaria (rumoured to have been a co-author of The Green Book). The Sudanese People's Liberation Front was founded in 1984. In May 1985 the Sudanese Movement of Revolutionary Committees was formed as an outgrowth of the Sudanese People's Socialist Front.
