= Harold Kreis =

German-Canadian ice hockey player and coach

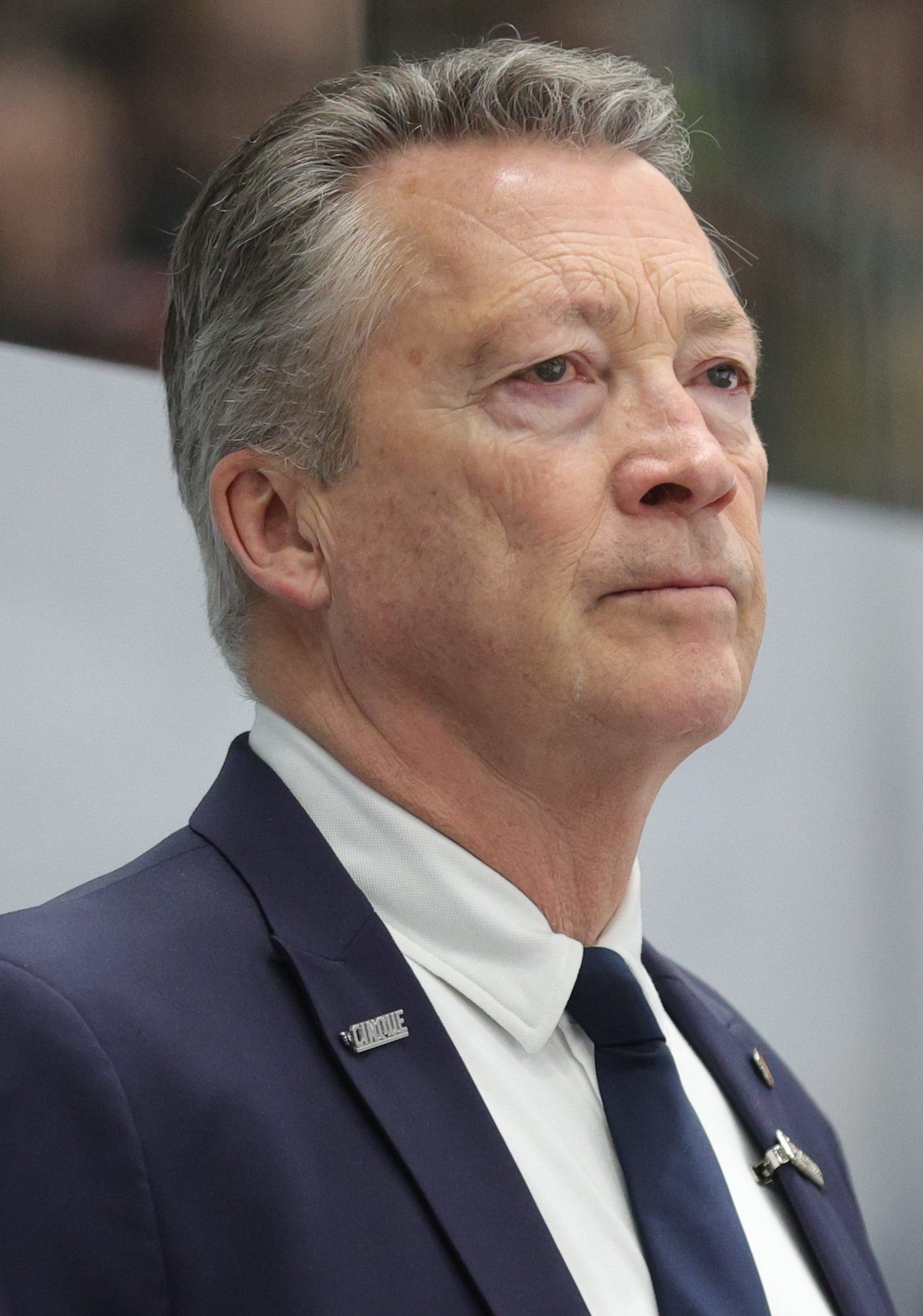
- Kreis in 2024
- Born: January 19, 1959 (age 67) Winnipeg, Manitoba, Canada
- Height: 180 cm (5 ft 11 in)
- Weight: 89 kg (196 lb; 14 st 0 lb)
- Position: Defence
- Shot: Right
- Played for: Mannheimer ERC
- Coached for: HC Lugano; ZSC Lions; DEG Metro Stars; Adler Mannheim; EV Zug; Düsseldorfer EG; Schwenninger Wild Wings
- National team: West Germany
- Playing career: 1977–1997
- Coaching career: 1997–present

Harold Kreis (born January 19, 1959) is a German–Canadian professional ice hockey coach and former player. He is a member of the German Ice Hockey Hall of Fame.

== Playing career ==
Born in Winnipeg, Manitoba, Canada, Kreis played junior ice hockey for the Kildonan North Stars and Calgary Wranglers in the 1970s. Kreis signed with Mannheimer ERC of the Eishockey-Bundesliga at the age of 19 in 1978. At the time, the club was looking for Canadian players of German descent, who were eligible for a German passport, because the number of foreign players per team was restricted in the German league. He would stay with the club until the end of his playing career in 1997. A longtime captain of the Mannheim team, Kreis won German championships in 1980 and 1997, he played a total of 891 games for the club.

After coming over to Germany, Kreis was also selected to represent the West German national teams internationally. In the course of his career, he won 180 caps for West Germany, playing in the Winter Olympics in 1984 and 1988, and eight World Championships. He also represented West Germany at the 1979 World Junior Championships.

== Coaching career ==
Kreis joined the Mannheim coaching staff as an assistant after retiring as a player in 1997 and helped guide the team to German championships in 1998 and 1999. In November 1999, he was hired for his first head coach position, as he took over second-division side EC Bad Nauheim. After a stint as assistant coach with Kölner Haie in 2000–01, Kreis returned to Bad Nauheim and remained in the job until February 2002.

He signed with HC Davos of the National League A (NLA), the top-tier of Swiss ice hockey, for the 2002–03 season, serving as assistant coach on the club’s men’s team and head coach of the junior squad. Kreis left Davos following the 2004–05 season to take over head coaching duties at Swiss second-division side EHC Chur. During the 2006 NLA playoffs, he was named head coach of HC Lugano. Lugano was down 0–2 in the quarterfinals, when Kreis took over and guided the team to the title. This was later called the "most amazing comeback in Swiss playoff history".

He won more silverware in 2008, when he captured his second Swiss championship title, this time with the ZSC Lions. Following the championship season and a two-year tenure in Zurich, the DEG Metro Stars of the German top-flight Deutsche Eishockey Liga appointed Kreis head coach in 2008. Under his guidance, DEG reached the DEL finals in 2009. In March 2010, he was sacked after a streak of eight losses in eleven games and after it was published that Kreis had signed a contract as head coach of fellow DEL side Adler Mannheim for the following season.

His coaching tenure with Mannheim lasted three and a half years and included a DEL finals appearance in 2012. In January 2014, Kreis and the Adler organization parted company by mutual consent after a 5–0 loss to Wolfsburg.

In March 2014, Kreis agreed on a two-year deal with Swiss NLA team EV Zug and was handed a contract extension until 2017 in September 2015. In the 2016–17 season, he steered Zug to the NLA finals where they lost 4–2 to Bern. In April 2017, Kreis signed a fresh two-year contract with the EVZ organization. In the 2017–18 campaign, Kreis led EVZ to a second-place finish in the regular season before losing in the playoff quarterfinals. After the season, he parted ways with Zug and then returned for a second stint as head coach of German team Düsseldorfer EG. Kreis parted company with the Düsseldorf team when his contract expired at the end of the season 2021–22 season.

He was hired as Schwenninger Wild Wings head coach for the 2022–23 season.

=== Coaching internationally ===
Kreis served as assistant coach of the German men's team at three World Championships. He was announced as the new German head coach on January 30, 2023. His tenure began after the conclusion of the 2022–23 domestic season. He led Germany to a silver medal at the 2023 World Championship.
