= Heinz Weifenbach =

- Born: 11 July 1939; Hemer, Germany
- Died: 21 February 2015 (aged 75)
- Occupation: Developer
- Known for: Chairman of ECD Iserlohn (1981–91)

Heinz Weifenbach (11 July 1939 – 21 February 2015) was a German ice hockey executive best known for the 1987 advertising contract he negotiated in which his club, the ECD Iserlohn, advertised Muammar Gaddafi's Green Book (German: Das Grüne Buch) on its shirts.

== Biography ==
Weifenbach, in private life a developer, took over as chairman of ECD Iserlohn in 1981 and held this position until 1991, with the club folding in between and reforming under the name of ECD Sauerland. Under Weifenbach, the club's greatest success came in 1986, when it reached the semi-finals of the play-offs. In its current incarnation, the club is known as the Iserlohn Roosters and plays in the Deutsche Eishockey Liga.

After resigning from his position as chairman in 1991, Weifenbach had little involvement with the club and ice hockey, rarely visiting the stadium. He was however well received when attending the 40th anniversary of ice hockey in Iserlohn and the crowd asked for him to take to the ice, calling him by his nickname, Big Heinz. His financial activities as chairman of the club eventually resulted in him serving a prison term, but he is, especially in Iserlohn, still regarded as somebody that tried to keep ice hockey in the town alive, and consequently still enjoys a good reputation. Weifenbach had privately employed many of the clubs ice hockey players through 13 different companies but, in many cases, had failed to pay taxes and mandatory social insurance premiums. Owing more than DM2 million in taxes, he was sentenced to four years in jail in 1993, of which he served 27 month. During his time as chairman, he invested a great deal of his own money in the club and was described by the sentencing judge as an "Ice hockey nut" (German: Eishockey-Verrückter).

In the last years of his life, Weifenbach suffered from dementia and required permanent care. He died on 21 February 2015.

== The Green Book ==
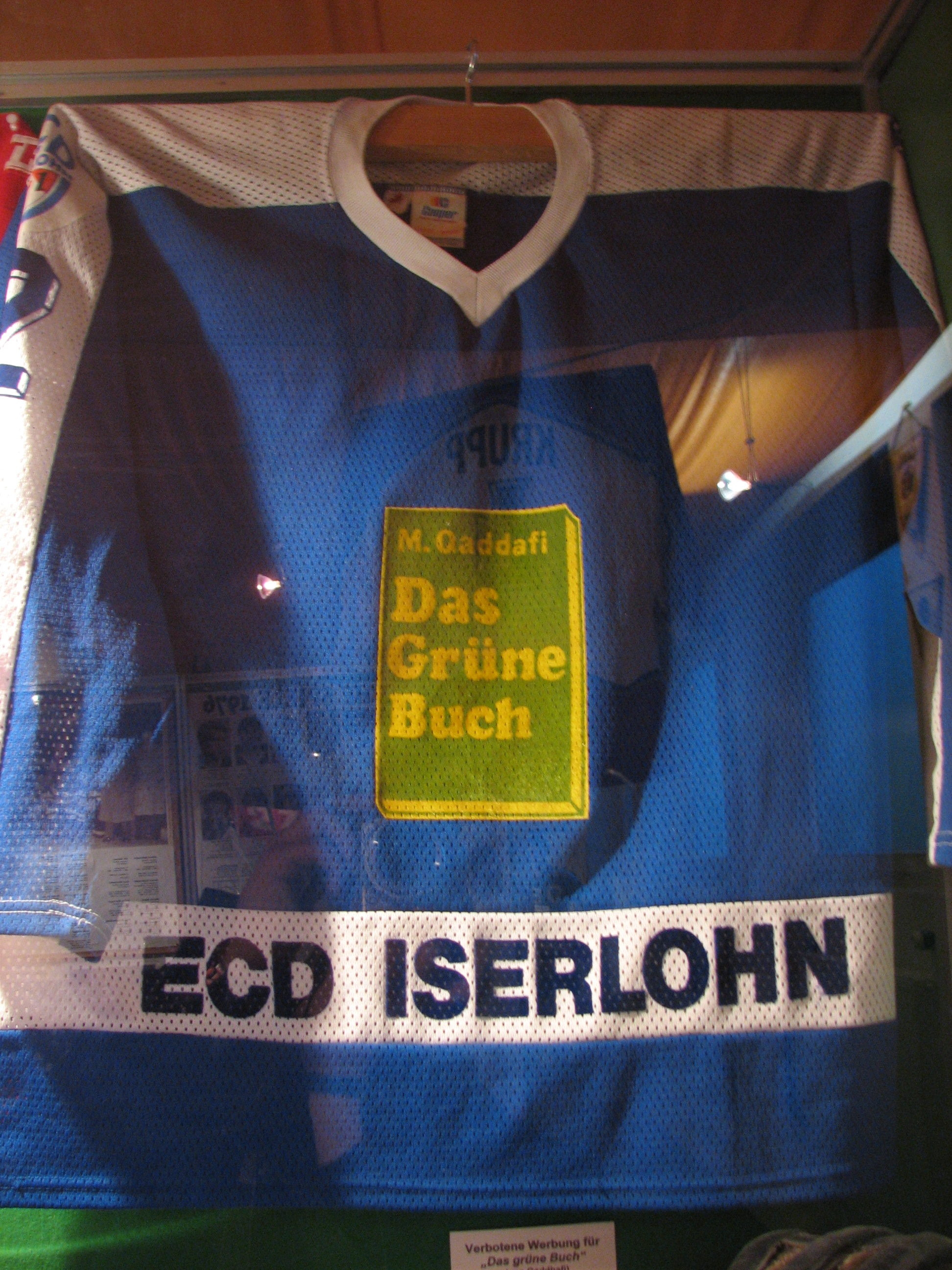
An ECD Iserlohn shirt with advertising for the Green Book, exhibited in the German Ice Hockey Hall of Fame.

Weifenbach's club, the ECD Iserlohn, had been rumored to be in financial trouble and to make under-hand payments to players for a number of years. A number of players had previously been investigated by the German tax department for this reason. In the summer of 1987, ECD found itself repeatedly rejected for an Ice hockey Bundesliga license and when it was eventually granted, two weeks before the start of the season, it was only because the other nine clubs had pushed the German Ice Hockey Federation, the DEB, to grant it under the promise that they would not demand compensation if the club did fold during the season. At the time, the club was reported to owe the tax department US$3.4 million.

The tax department did eventually demand outstanding tax repayments and, when they were not forthcoming, had the club declared insolvent. Following this, Weifenbach declared that there was no need to panic as he had a sponsor who was willing to support the club with DM10 million over the coming years. The sponsor turned out to be the organisation marketing Gaddafi's Green Book, the Center for the Studies and Researches of the Green Book, and ECD Iserlohn, on the 4 December 1987, took to the ice against SB Rosenheim with advertising for the Green Book on its shirts. Reportedly, the club received US$900,000 for the advertising of the book on its shirts and in its arena.

The DEB reacted promptly, banning the club from using the Green Book as a shirt sponsor on the grounds that religious or political advertising was illegal in German sports. For the following game, the ECD returned without a shirt sponsor. It was also the club's last game as the administrators deregistered it from competition.

Weifenbach however continued his fight for the club's survival, organising a flight to Libya for himself and 25 journalists to meet Muammar Gaddafi. Gaddafi signed copies of the Green Book for the visitors but may have known very little about the deal, asking, according to one of the accompanying journalists, what the name of the tennis club is he was sponsoring.

Weifenbach also took the case to the internal tribunal of the DEB who ruled partly in his favour. The club was allowed to continue its existence, now under the new name of ECD Sauerland, but not in the Bundesliga. Instead, if it fulfilled certain requirements, it would be allowed to enter the promotion round to the Bundesliga. In the end, Weifenbach was not able to raise a new team in time, the majority of the ECD Iserlohn players having left the club with the insolvency, and Sauerland was forced to restart play in the third division Oberliga.

The affair caused a rift between the Bundesliga clubs and the DEB, with some of them advocating a break away league which would have included Austrian and Italian clubs. Eventually, seven years later, this did happen, when the Deutsche Eishockey Liga was formed, but without any non-German teams.

Weifenbach continued his connections to Libya in the following year, when he advertised on cars of the then government owned Deutsche Post for a publishing company he owned, with the company's only published book being the Green Book, a move that, according to his former lawyer Ingo Graumann, caused embarrassment to the German government and consequently caused him to be sentenced to jail.

At least two of the shirts used in the game against Rosenheim may still survive. One was donated by Czech ice hockey player Robert Simon to the Deutsches Sport & Olympia Museum in Cologne in August 2011. Simon, who played 108 games for Iserlohn, had worn the shirt during the game but actually had to exchange it back with a collector to be able to donate it to the museum. A second shirt, different in color combination, is currently exhibited at the German Ice Hockey Hall of Fame in Augsburg.
