= Sudanese Movement of Revolutionary Committees =

The Sudanese Movement of Revolutionary Committees was a political movement in Sudan, whose ideology was based on The Green Book of Muammar Gaddafi. The organization was established in May 1985. The movement, which emerged as an outgrowth of the Tripoli-based Sudanese People's Socialist Front, was financially supported by the Libyan government. The movement was led by Abdullah Zakaria (rumoured to have been a co-author of The Green Book).

By late 1987 the movement appeared largely dormant, as popular interest to take part in the activities of the Revolutionary Committees had been weak.
