= Serge Aubin =

Canadian ice hockey player (born 1975)

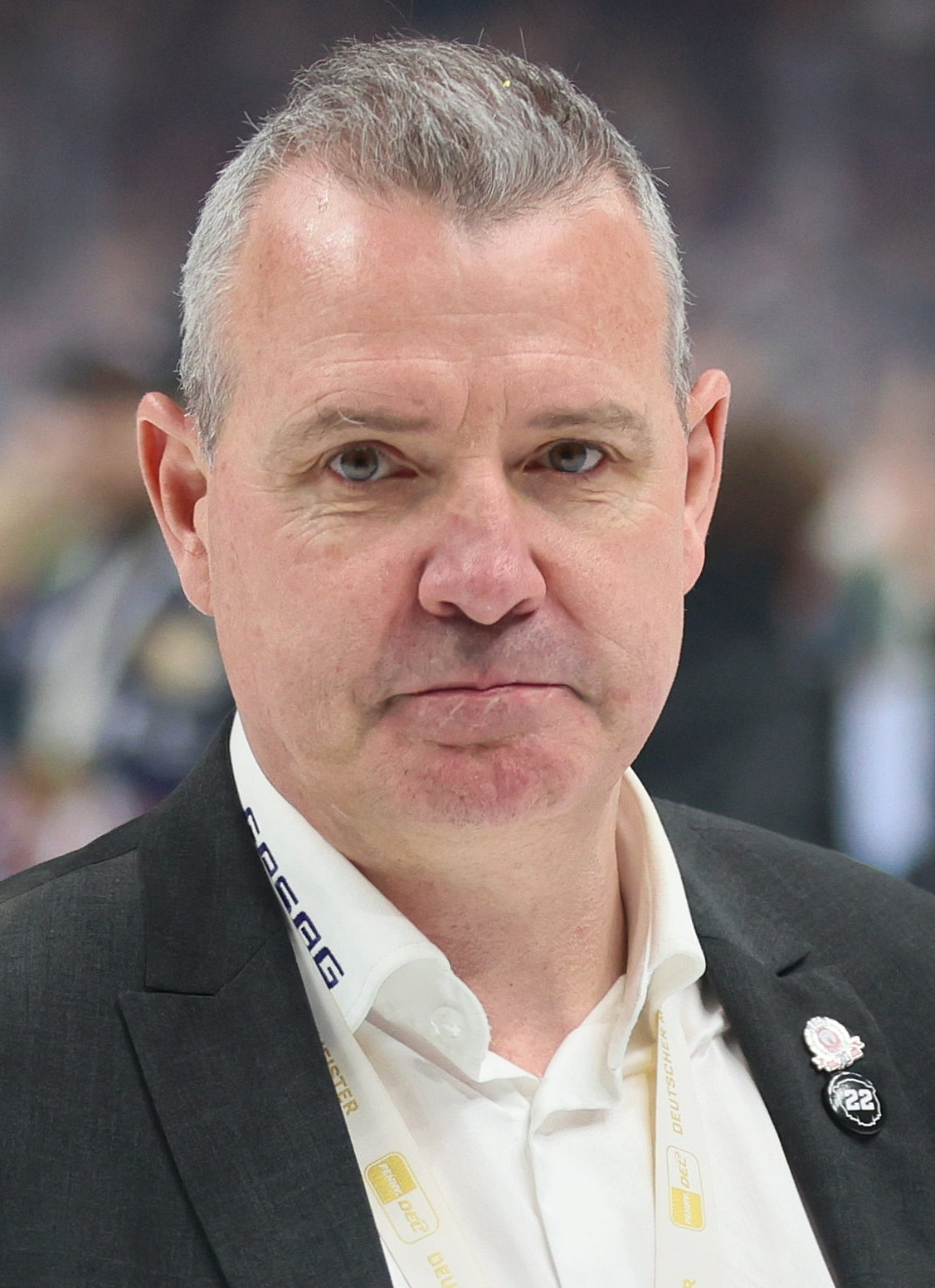
- Aubin in 2025
- Born: February 15, 1975 (age 51) Val-d'Or, Quebec, Canada
- Height: 6 ft 1 in (185 cm)
- Weight: 200 lb (91 kg; 14 st 4 lb)
- Position: Centre
- Shot: Left
- Played for: Colorado Avalanche; Columbus Blue Jackets; Atlanta Thrashers; Genève-Servette HC; HC Fribourg-Gottéron; Hamburg Freezers
- NHL draft: 161st overall, 1994; Pittsburgh Penguins
- Playing career: 1995–2013

Serge D. Aubin (born February 15, 1975) is a Canadian ice hockey coach and a former professional ice hockey centre who played 374 games in the National Hockey League for the Colorado Avalanche, Columbus Blue Jackets and Atlanta Thrashers. He is currently serving as head coach of SC Bern in the Swiss National League. He was previously the head coach of Eisbären Berlin in the German DEL from 2019 to 2026.

== Playing career ==
Aubin was drafted in the 1994 NHL entry draft, in the 7th round, 161st overall by the Pittsburgh Penguins. He spent his junior years playing in the QMJHL, playing for the Drummondville Voltigeurs and the Granby Bisons. Until 1999, Aubin was mostly playing for the NHL's farm league, having only played one NHL game for the Colorado Avalanche. He spent time with the Hampton Roads Admirals of the ECHL and in the AHL with the Syracuse Crunch and the Hershey Bears.

After playing 15 more regular season games and 17 playoff games for Colorado, Aubin moved to the Columbus Blue Jackets as a free agent on July 11, 2000. It was with the Blue Jackets where Aubin had his best season in 2000–01, scoring 13 goals and 17 assists for 30 points and only missed one game the entire season. After another season with Columbus, he was brought back to Colorado, but after just one season, Aubin was claimed by the Atlanta Thrashers in the NHL waiver draft. In the 2003–04 he scored 25 points, 5 short of his NHL career best in scoring.

During the 2004–05 NHL lockout, which resulted in the cancellation of the 2004–05 NHL season, Aubin played in Switzerland for Genève-Servette HC. Aubin returned to the Thrashers for the 2005–06 season, his last in the NHL. He returned to Geneva for the 2006–07 season. After the season ended for HC Genève-Servette, he was hired by EHC Biel to play in the Nationalliga B playoff finals and in a possible promotion series. Aubin was named captain of the Canadian team for the 2007 Spengler Cup, he signed than on 7 April 2009 by HC Fribourg-Gottéron.

Following a Quarterfinal defeat in the 2010–11 season, Aubin left Fribourg as a free agent and signed a two-year contract with Deutsche Eishockey Liga club, the Hamburg Freezers, on March 28, 2011. In 46 games, Aubin produced a respectable 31 points. With his veteran experience and leadership a positive for the Freezers, Aubin returned to play in the following pre-season European Tournament, however after suffering a severe thumb injury Aubin was unable to play for the Freezers in the 2012–13 season and announced his retirement on January 15, 2013.

== Coaching career ==
Aubin was then named an assistant coach for the Freezers, beginning the 2013–14 season. In the following season he replaced Benoit Laporte on September 25, 2014, and took over head coaching responsibilities. In November 2014, he was named to the coaching staff of the Canadian Men's National Team for the Deutschland Cup, serving as assistant to head coach Jeff Tomlinson. One year later, Aubin served as an assistant coach for the German Men's National Team at the Deutschland Cup. In January 2015, he signed a contract extension, that would keep him in Hamburg until 2017. However, the Freezers organization folded in May 2016, which ended Aubin's coaching tenure in Hamburg.

On June 7, 2016, Aubin was named head coach of the Vienna Capitals of the Austrian Hockey League. He guided the team to the championship in his first year as coach. On December 29, 2017, the ZSC Lions of the National League announced that Aubin would take over the head coaching job at ZSC starting with the 2018–19 season. He was sacked on January 14, 2019, after failing to guide the club to expectations. In May 2019, he signed a two-year deal as head coach of German DEL team Eisbären Berlin.

== Career statistics ==
			Regular season					Playoffs
Season	Team	League	GP	G	A	Pts	PIM	GP	G	A	Pts	PIM
1992–93	Drummondville Voltigeurs	QMJHL	65	16	34	50	30	—	—	—	—	—
1993–94	Granby Bisons	QMJHL	63	42	32	74	80	—	—	—	—	—
1994–95	Granby Bisons	QMJHL	60	37	73	110	55	11	8	15	23	4
1995–96	Hampton Roads Admirals	ECHL	62	24	62	86	74	3	1	4	5	10
1995–96	Cleveland Lumberjacks	IHL	2	0	0	0	0	2	0	0	0	0
1996–97	Cleveland Lumberjacks	IHL	57	9	16	25	38	2	0	0	0	0
1997–98	Syracuse Crunch	AHL	55	6	14	20	57	—	—	—	—	—
1997–98	Hershey Bears	AHL	5	2	1	3	0	7	1	3	4	6
1998–99	Colorado Avalanche	NHL	1	0	0	0	0	—	—	—	—	—
1998–99	Hershey Bears	AHL	64	30	39	69	58	3	0	1	1	2
1999–00	Hershey Bears	AHL	58	42	38	80	56	—	—	—	—	—
1999–00	Colorado Avalanche	NHL	15	2	1	3	6	17	0	1	1	6
2000–01	Columbus Blue Jackets	NHL	81	13	17	30	107	—	—	—	—	—
2001–02	Columbus Blue Jackets	NHL	71	8	8	16	32	—	—	—	—	—
2002–03	Colorado Avalanche	NHL	66	4	6	10	64	5	0	0	0	4
2003–04	Atlanta Thrashers	NHL	66	10	15	25	73	—	—	—	—	—
2004–05	Genève-Servette HC	NLA	6	2	1	3	8	3	1	2	3	2
2005–06	Atlanta Thrashers	NHL	74	7	17	24	79	—	—	—	—	—
2006–07	Genève-Servette HC	NLA	40	21	29	50	50	5	1	2	3	8
2006–07	EHC Biel	NLB	—	—	—	—	—	10	6	13	19	10
2007–08	Genève-Servette HC	NLA	47	27	35	62	65	13	2	10	12	22
2008–09	Genève-Servette HC	NLA	36	14	28	42	61	4	0	3	3	4
2009–10	HC Fribourg-Gottéron	NLA	49	20	21	41	62	5	0	2	2	2
2010–11	HC Fribourg-Gottéron	NLA	31	7	17	24	12	4	0	0	0	4
2011–12	Hamburg Freezers	DEL	46	11	20	31	59	5	3	0	3	2
NHL totals			374	44	64	108	361	22	0	1	1	10

== Awards and honours ==
Award	Year
AHL
First All-Star Team	1999–2000
DEL
Coach of the year	2021–22
