= German Ice Hockey Hall of Fame =

Hockey hall of fame in Germany

Coordinates: 48°22′33.38″N 10°52′49.88″E

The German Ice Hockey Hall of Fame German: Eishockeymuseum was founded in 1988, and is located in Augsburg. The hall honors individuals who have contributed to ice hockey in Germany, and displays memorabilia depicting contributions of players, coaches, referees, and other important figures in the sport.

== History ==
In 1988, Roman Neumayer and Horst Eckert co-founded the German Ice Hockey Museum and German Ice Hockey Hall of Fame. The exhibits toured German cities including Garmisch-Partenkirchen, Mannheim, and Landshut until 1993; and were displayed during the 1993 Men's Ice Hockey World Championships in Munich. The exhibits were stored in Füssen until 1999, when Neumayer suggested a permanent museum in Augsburg. The IIHF since declared it was one of the four best ice hockey museums in Europe.

== Notable inductees ==
There are 247 inductees into the hall of fame as of 2018. Notable inductees include:

- Paul Ambros
- Franz Baader
- Ignaz Berndaner
- Joachim von Bethmann-Hollweg
- René Bielke
- Helmut de Raaf
- Hans Dobida
- Jan-Åke Edvinsson
- Sven Felski
- Karl Friesen
- Lorenz Funk
- Erich Goldmann
- Jozef Golonka
- Bruno Guttowski
- Dieter Hegen
- Heinz Henschel
- Uli Hiemer
- Udo Kiessling
- Josef Kompalla
- Ēriks Koņeckis
- Erich Kühnhackl
- Peter Lee
- Wolf-Dieter Montag
- Klaus Merk
- Roman Neumayer
- Hartmut Nickel
- Rainer Philipp
- Roy Roedger
- Erich Römer
- Michael Rumrich
- Marquardt Slevogt
- Ján Starší
- Rudolf Thanner
- Xaver Unsinn
- Stefan Ustorf
- Ferenc Vozar
- Heinz Weifenbach
- Hans Zach
