= Riegsee =

- Municipality
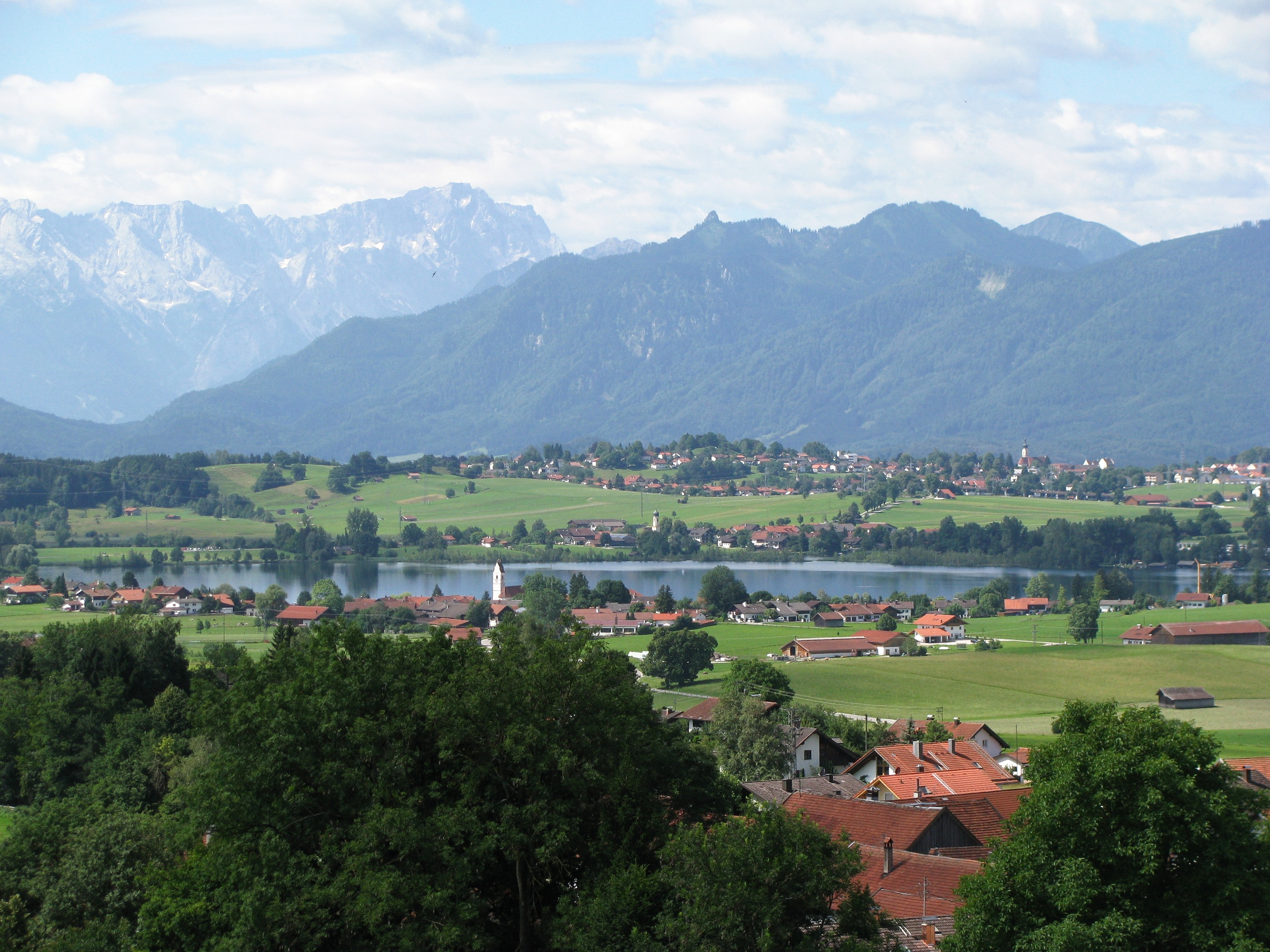
- General view of the village

- Coat of arms

- Location of Riegsee within Garmisch-Partenkirchen district
- Interactive map of Riegsee
- Location within Germany Location within Bavaria
- Coordinates: 47°41′56″N 11°14′02″E
- Country: Germany
- State: Bavaria
- Admin. region: Oberbayern
- District: Garmisch-Partenkirchen
- Municipal assoc.: Seehausen am Staffelsee

Government
  - Mayor (2020–26): Jörg Steinleinter

Area
  - Total: 20.44 km^{2} (7.89 sq mi)
- Elevation: 668 m (2,192 ft)

Population (2025-12-31)
  - Total: 1,260
  - Density: 61.6/km^{2} (160/sq mi)
- Time zone: UTC+01:00 (CET)
  - Summer (DST): UTC+02:00 (CEST)
- Postal codes: 82418
- Dialling codes: 08841
- Vehicle registration: GAP
- Website: www.riegsee.de

Riegsee is a municipality in the district of Garmisch-Partenkirchen, in Bavaria, Germany. The town lies on Riegsee Lake, of the same name.

== Names ==
The name Riegsee derives from the personal name Ruodgis and the Old High German word for "lake", sê(o). Attested historical forms of the name include Ruodgise (1050–c. 1065), Rvodgisisse (1052–55), Roueggese (c. 1065–75), Ruodkisesse/Rotkisesse (1152–53), Ruetgisse (1193–95), Ruggessê (1193–95), Roͮikisse (12th century), Rovchse (c. 1200), Rügsee (14th century), Rugksee (1403), Ruexsee (1431), Rügksee (1501), Riechsee (c. 1583), and Riegsee (1629).

== Notable people ==
- Wolf-Dieter Montag resided in Riegsee later in life
