= Jeff Tomlinson =

Jeffrey "Jeff" Tomlinson (born April 23, 1970) is a Canadian-German professional ice hockey coach. He was most recently the head coach of the EHC Kloten in the National League (NL).

== Playing career ==
Born in Winnipeg, Manitoba, Tomlinson played for the Prince Albert Raiders, the Roanoke Valley Rebels and the Raleigh Icecaps, before taking his game to Germany in 1992. After almost five years with EC Timmendorfer Strand, he had a short stint with the Berlin Capitals of the Deutsche Eishockey Liga during the 1996-97 season and then would spend the following three years in England, playing for Manchester Storm.

In 2000, Tomlinson came back to the German capital city, signing with Eisbären Berlin, where he would stay for the remainder of his playing tenure. After suffering a torn ACL in November 2002, he tried to come back to the game, but decided to end his playing career in 2004.

== Coaching career ==
Tomlinson started his career behind the bench at the Eisbären Berlin organization, serving as head coach of the club’s youth team, Eisbären Berlin Juniors, between 2004 and 2007. He then served as an assistant coach of Eisbären Berlin in the German elite league Deutsche Eishockey Liga (DEL) until 2010. In July 2010, Tomlinson was appointed head coach of fellow DEL-side Düsseldorfer EG and would guide the team to back-to-back playoff appearances. He moved to the Nürnberg IceTigers for the 2012-13 season, but was sacked in December 2012. Under his guidance, the IceTigers had suffered defeat in 15 of 25 games played.

In July 2013, he returned to Eisbären Berlin, taking over as head coach on a two-year contract. He was released in December 2014 and replaced by Uwe Krupp.

In June 2015, Tomlinson agreed on a one-year deal with Swiss team Rapperswil-Jona Lakers. Later that year, he inked a contract extension through the 2017-18 campaign. He guided the Lakers to the 2016 NLB finals, where they fell short to HC Ajoie. In 2016-17, he led them to another finals appearance, but fell short of the title once again, being defeated by SC Langenthal. In the 2017-18 season, Tomlinson's Rapperswil team captured the title in the NLB and earned promotion to the top-tier National League by holding off EHC Kloten in the relegation round. Prior to the 2021-22 season, he was named EHC Kloten head coach. Tomlinson took the Kloten team back up to the Swiss National League in 2022. In January 2023, he announced his plans to step back from the Kloten coaching job at the end of the 2022-23 season, citing health reasons. Tomlinson had undergone a kidney transplantation in 2019. After leaving the head coach role, he became a EHC Kloten consultant. Due to an optic nerve infarction, he has been almost completely blind in both eyes since 2020.

== Coaching internationally ==
Tomlinson served as head coach of the Canadian Men’s National Team at the 2014 Deutschland-Cup and was part of the coaching staff for Germany’s Men’s National Team during the 2015 World Championships, serving as assistant to head coach Pat Cortina.

In December 2023, Tomlinson was a member of Team Canada's coaching staff at the Spengler Cup.
