= Seehausen am Staffelsee (Verwaltungsgemeinschaft) =

- Verwaltungsgemeinschaft
- Location of Seehausen am Staffelsee within Garmisch-Partenkirchen district
- Interactive map of Seehausen am Staffelsee
- Location within Germany Location within Bavaria
- Coordinates: 47°42′N 11°11′E
- Country: Germany
- State: Bavaria
- Admin. region: Upper Bavaria
- District: Garmisch-Partenkirchen
- Seat: Seehausen am Staffelsee
- Subdivisions: 3 municipalities

Area
  - Total: 43.89 km^{2} (16.95 sq mi)

Population (2025-12-31)
  - Total: 4,439
  - Density: 101.1/km^{2} (261.9/sq mi)
- Time zone: UTC+01:00 (CET)
  - Summer (DST): UTC+02:00 (CEST)
- Website: www.vg-seehausen.de

Seehausen am Staffelsee is a Verwaltungsgemeinschaft (municipal association) in the district of Garmisch-Partenkirchen in Bavaria, Germany. Its seat is in Seehausen am Staffelsee.

It consists of the following municipalities:

1. Riegsee
2. Seehausen am Staffelsee
3. Spatzenhausen
