= People's Establishment for Publication, Distribution, and Advertising =

Former Libyan governmental agency

Department overview
- Formed: 1975
- Dissolved: 2011
- Jurisdiction: General People's Committee
- Headquarters: Tripoli, Libya
- Employees: 600 (1988)
- Department executive: Mohamed Ahmad Zwai, Chairman

The People's Establishment for Publication, Distribution, and Advertising was a government agency of the Great Socialist People's Libyan Arab Jamahiriya responsible for the publication and distribution of The Green Book (written by Muammar Gaddafi) and related literature that propagated the Third International Theory of Gaddafi, founded in 1975. The People's Establishment was an organ of the General People's Committee.
