= Augsburger Panther =

- City: Augsburg, Germany
- League: Deutsche Eishockey Liga
- Founded: 1878
- Home arena: Curt Frenzel Stadion (capacity: 6,218)
- Colors
- Owner: Lothar Sigl
- General manager: Markus Keller
- Head coach: Bill Peters
- Website: aev-panther.de

Franchise history
- 1878–1994: Augsburger EV
- 1994–: Augsburger Panther

The Augsburger Panther are a professional ice hockey team in the DEL. The team is based in Augsburg, Bavaria, Germany. They play their home games at the Curt Frenzel Stadion.

Founded in 1878, the team's name was Augsburger EV (Augsburger Eislaufverein, i.e. "Augsburgian Skating Society") until 1994, when it was changed to Augsburger Panther.

== Season records ==
Season	Games	Won	Lost	Tie	OTL	SOL	Points	Goals for	Goals against	Rank	Playoffs
DEL
1994–95	44	12	25	7	-	-	31	137	189	13	Lost in preliminary round
1995–96	50	17	27	6	-	-	42	163	180	12	Lost in quarterfinals
1996–97	48	21	21	5	1	-	48	176	181	11	No playoffs
1997–98	44	16	24	2	2	-	36	122	160	13	Lost in preliminary round
1998–99	52	22	19	8	3	-	85	169	155	8	Lost in quarterfinals
1999–00	56	30	24	0	2	-	90	178	161	8	Lost in quarterfinals
2000–01	60	26	31	0	3	-	73	187	242	14	No playoffs
2001–02	60	31	23	0	6	-	91	185	189	8	Lost in quarterfinals
2002–03	52	22	24	6	0	-	66	127	146	11	No playoffs
2003–04	52	26	21	0	5	-	78	180	177	9	No playoffs
2004–05	52	24	22	0	6	-	76	150	154	7	Lost in quarterfinals
2005–06	52	20	26	-	0	6	61	139	184	12	No playoffs
2006–07	52	17	32	-	2	1	48	148	205	13	No playoffs
2007–08	56	23	28	-	3	2	67	158	187	12	No playoffs
2008–09	52	26	22	-	2	2	80	156	178	10	Lost in preliminary round
2009–10	56	31	24	-	1	0	87	201	188	8	Lost in finals
2010–11	52	20	25	-	3	4	63	162	175	14	No playoffs
2011–12	52	26	19	-	1	6	79	135	131	8	Lost in preliminary round
2012–13	52	26	23	-	1	2	77	137	155	8	Lost in preliminary round
2013–14	52	18	24	-	1	4	69	147	179	11	No playoffs
2014–15	52	17	30	-	3	2	53	139	185	12	No playoffs
2015–16	52	20	27	-	0	1	69	158	185	12	No playoffs
2016–17	52	30	18	-	1	3	87	155	152	6	Lost in quarterfinals
2017–18	52	17	25	-	1	5	65	151	158	12	No playoffs
2018–19	52	24	18	-	5	1	86	149	139	3	Lost in semi-finals
2019–20	52	22	22	-	5	3	72	142	152	10	Cancelled due to the COVID-19 pandemic.
2020–21	38	17	20	-	1	0	46	107	134	11	No playoffs
2021–22	52	20	21	-	8	3	67	137	169	11	No playoffs
2022–23	56	16	32	-	6	2	51	138	193	14	No playoffs
2023–24	52	12	29	-	6	5	53	138	177	14	No playoffs
2024–25	52	18	31	-	1	2	51	135	185	13	No playoffs
2025–26	52	19	24	-	5	4	60	150	189	11	No playoffs

== Players ==
=== Current roster ===
Updated 9 August 2025.

No.	Nat	Player	Pos	S/G	Age	Acquired	Birthplace
26	(Germany)	Alexander Blank	F	L	24	2025	Berlin, Germany
22	(Canada)	Madison Bowey	D	R	31	2025	Winnipeg, Manitoba, Canada
14	(United States)	D.J. Busdeker	RW	R	26	2024	Dexter, Michigan, United States
55	(Germany)	Ryan Button	D	L	35	2025	Edmonton, Alberta, Canada
92	(Canada)	Joseph Cramarossa	C	L	33	2025	Markham, Ontario, Canada
19	(Canada)	Riley Damiani	C	R	26	2024	Mississauga, Ontario, Canada
67	(Germany)	Florian Elias	C	L	23	2024	Augsburg, Germany
46	(Germany)	Moritz Elias	RW	L	22	2023	Augsburg, Germany
34	(Canada)	Michael Garteig	G	L	34	2025	Prince George, British Columbia, Canada
82	(Canada)	Alexandre Grenier	RW	R	34	2025	Laval, Quebec, Canada
25	(Germany)	Christian Hanke	F	R	22	2022	Forchheim, Germany
52	(Germany)	Enrico Henriquez	F	L	24	2025	Bad Aibling, Germany
41	(United States)	Peyton Jones	G	L	30	2025	Langhorne, Pennsylvania, United States
20	(Canada)	Cody Kunyk (A)	C	L	35	2024	Sherwood Park, Alberta, Canada
18	(United States)	Anthony Louis (A)	C	L	31	2024	Winfield, Illinois, United States
27	(United States)	Kyle Mayhew	D	L	28	2025	Anaheim Hills, California, United States
68	(Germany)	Fabrizio Pilu	D	R	23	2025	Mannheim, Germany
58	(Germany)	Maximilian Renner	D	R	34	2023	Rosenheim, Germany
62	(Canada)	Thomas Schemitsch	D	R	29	2024	Thornhill, Ontario, Canada
77	(Germany)	Luca Tosto	F	L	25	2023	Bad Tölz, Germany
24	(Canada)	T.J. Trevelyan	LW	L	42	2011	Mississauga, Ontario, Canada
43	(Germany)	Leon van der Linde	D	L	23	2023	Lindau, Germany
9	(Germany)	Moritz Wirth	D	L	26	2025	Frankfurt, Germany
33	(Germany)	Tim Wohlgemuth	C	L	26	2025	Landsberg am Lech, Germany
83	(Germany)	Sebastian Zwickl	F	L	19	2025	Rosenheim, Germany

=== Notable alumni ===
- Dennis Endras – First German Player who was voted for MVP at IIHF World Championships 2010
- Duanne Moeser – The club's all-time scoring leader, he played 15 years in Augsburg and since 2005/2006 he has been working in the club's management
- Ernst Höfner – 3x Bundesliga champion and currently assistant head coach of the German National Hockey Team
- Glenn Anderson – Represented Canada at the 1980 Olympics, twice at the World Championships, the Canada Cup, and won six Stanley Cups
- Paul Ambros – 11x Bundesliga champion
- Udo Kießling – 6x Bundesliga champion and member of the IIHF-Hockey Hall of Fame
- Xaver Unsinn – 8x Bundesliga champion and former head coach of the German National Hockey Team
