= Germany men's national ice hockey team =

Men's national ice hockey team representing Germany

Germany
- Nickname: Träger der Adler (Bearers of the Eagle)
- Association: Deutscher Eishockey-Bund
- General manager: Christian Künast
- Head coach: Harold Kreis
- Assistants: Mark French; Rob Leask; Alexander Sulzer
- Captain: Moritz Seider
- Most games: Udo Kießling (321)
- Top scorer: Erich Kühnhackl (134)
- Most points: Erich Kühnhackl (224)
- Team colors
- IIHF code: GER
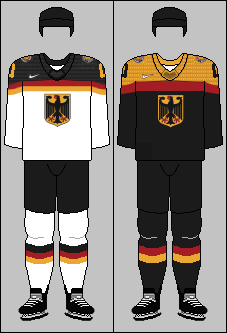

Ranking
- Current IIHF: 7 (3 June 2026)
- Highest IIHF: 5 (2021, 2023)
- Lowest IIHF: 13 (2014–15)

First international
- England 1–0 Germany (Montreux, Switzerland; 10 January 1910)

Biggest win
- Germany 14–0 FR Yugoslavia (Ljubljana, Slovenia; 10 February 2000)

Biggest defeat
- Soviet Union 10–0 Germany (Zug, Switzerland; 7 December 1990); Canada 10–0 Germany (Prague, Czech Republic; 3 May 2015)

Olympics
- Appearances: 22 (first in 1928)
- Medals: Silver (2018); Bronze (1932, 1976)

IIHF World Championships
- Appearances: 71 (first in 1930)
- Best result: (silver) (1930, 1953, 2023)

European Championships
- Appearances: 8 (first in 1910)
- Best result: (silver) (1910, 1911, 1914)

International record (W–L–T)
- 604–822–118

Medal record

Olympic Games
Silver medal – second place	2018 Pyeongchang	Team
Bronze medal – third place	1932 Lake Placid	Team
Bronze medal – third place	1976 Innsbruck	Team

World Championship
Silver medal – second place	1930 Austria/France/Germany	
Silver medal – second place	1953 Switzerland	
Silver medal – second place	2023 Finland/Latvia	
Bronze medal – third place	1932 United States	
Bronze medal – third place	1934 Italy	

European Championship
Silver medal – second place	1910 Switzerland	
Silver medal – second place	1911 Germany	
Silver medal – second place	1912 Austria-Hungary	
Silver medal – second place	1914 Germany	
Bronze medal – third place	1913 Germany	
Bronze medal – third place	1927 Austria	

The German men's national ice hockey team is the national ice hockey team of Germany and is controlled by the German Ice Hockey Federation. It first participated in serious international competition at the 1911 European Hockey Championship. When Germany was split after World War II, a separate East Germany national ice hockey team existed until 1990. By 1991, the West and East German teams and players were merged into the United German team. The team's head coach is Harold Kreis.

Germany has won several medals at the World Championships, including three silver medals in 1930, 1953 and 2023, as well as a silver medal at the 2018 Winter Olympics.

== History ==
=== West Germany ===
The West German team's greatest success came in 1976 at the Winter Olympics, when the team went 2–3–0 and won the bronze medal. The Swedish and Canadian teams, traditionally two hockey powerhouses, had boycotted the 1976 Games in protest of the amateur rules that allowed Eastern Bloc countries to send their best players while keeping Western nations from doing the same.

West Germany's wins in the 1976 Games came against the United States (4–1) and Poland (7–4).

In 1980, the team did not do as well and only won one game in the preliminary round, which kept them from advancing. They finished 10th out of 12.

In 1984, the team was invited to the Canada Cup. By 1991, the reunification of East and West Germany meant the inclusion of players from the former East Germany.

=== Post-unification ===
The team is considered to be slightly behind the Big Six (Canada, the Czech Republic, Finland, Russia, Sweden and the United States); they are ranked 7th in the world (2026) by the IIHF. Since re-unification, their best result is silver in the 2018 Olympic Winter Games, when they lost to the Olympic Athletes From Russia 4–3 in overtime. It was the first time that Germany had reached the gold medal game at the Winter Olympics. Other top results include finishing in 6th place at the 2003 World Championships where they lost a close quarter-final match in overtime to Canada, and 4th at the 2010 World Championships where they lost to Sweden in the bronze medal game, their best placement since 1953. Previously, they finished third in the European Group and qualified for the quarter-finals at the 1996 World Cup after a surprising 7–1 victory against the Czech Republic. In the 1992 Olympics, they lost to Canada 4–3 in an overtime shoot-out in the quarter-finals.

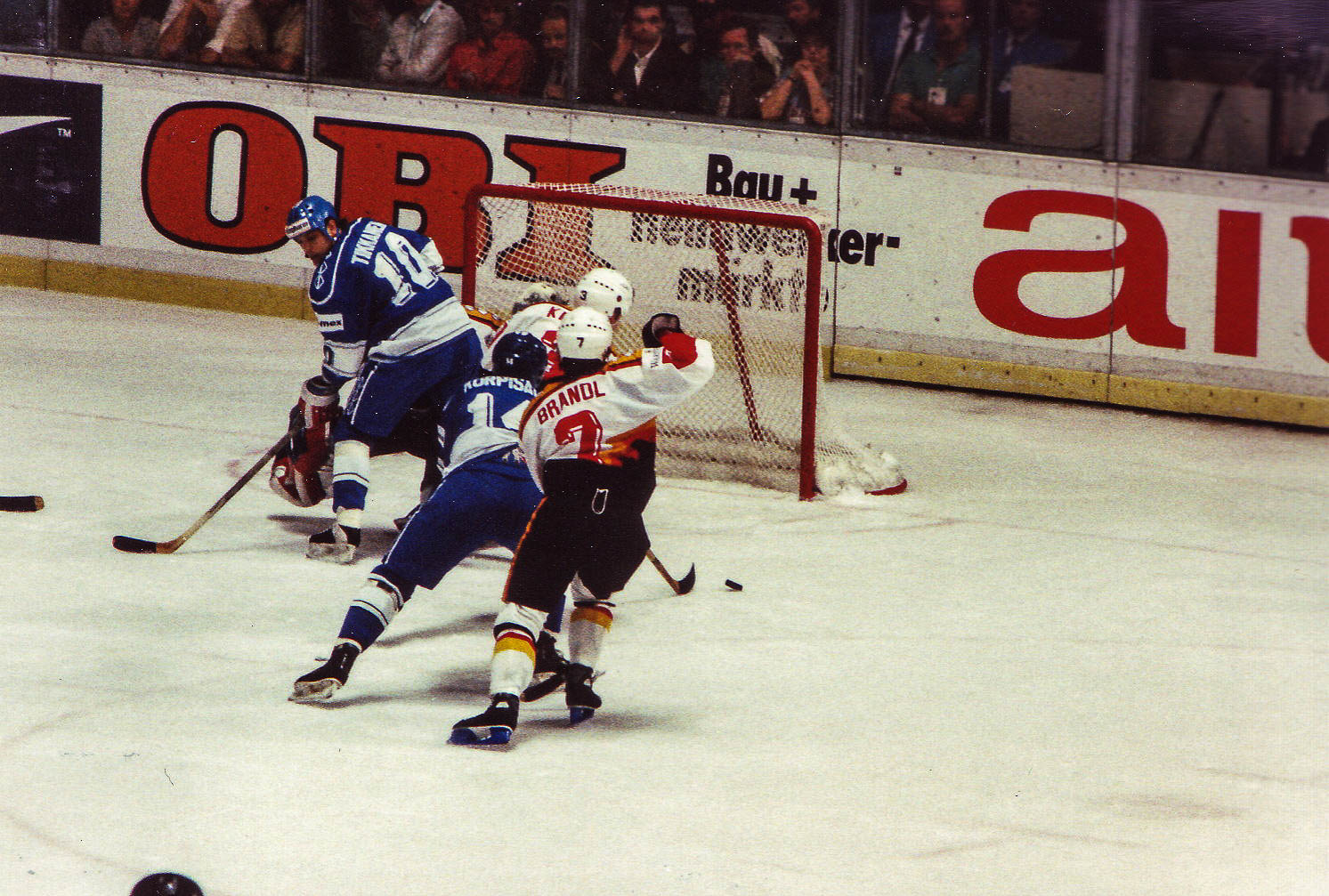
Finland and Germany in the 1993 World Championships

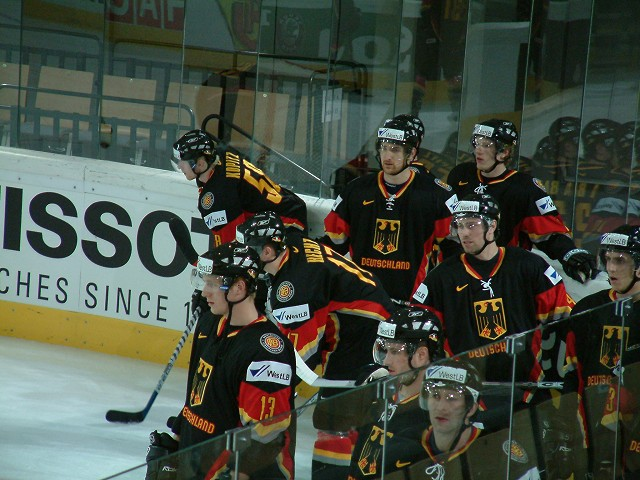
The German national team at the 2005 World Championship

== Competition results ==
=== Olympic Games ===
Games	Coach	Captain	Finish
(Switzerland) 1928 St. Moritz	Erich Römer	Walter Sachs	10th
(United States) 1932 Lake Placid	Erich Römer	Gustav Jaenecke	Bronze
(Germany) 1936 Garmisch-Partenkirchen	(Canada) Val Hoffinger	Rudi Ball	5th
In 1949, Germany was split and was succeeded by West Germany and East Germany
(Switzerland) 1948 St. Moritz	did not compete		
(Norway) 1952 Oslo	(Canada) Joe Aitken	Herbert Schibukat	8th
(Italy) 1956 Cortina d'Ampezzo	As United Team of Germany		
(Italy) 1956 Cortina d'Ampezzo	(Canada) Frank Trottier	Paul Ambros	6th
(United States) 1960 Squaw Valley	As United Team of Germany		
(United States) 1960 Squaw Valley	Karl Wild	Heinz Henschel	6th
(Austria) 1964 Innsbruck	As United Team of Germany		
(Austria) 1964 Innsbruck	Egen, Holderied, Unsinn	Ernst Trautwein	7th
(France) 1968 Grenoble	(Canada) Ed Reigle	Heinz Bader	7th
(Japan) 1972 Sapporo	Gerhard Kießling	Alois Schloder	7th
(Austria) 1976 Innsbruck	Xaver Unsinn	Alois Schloder	Bronze
(United States) 1980 Lake Placid	Hans Rampf	Rainer Philipp	10th
(Socialist Federal Republic of Yugoslavia) 1984 Sarajevo	Xaver Unsinn	Erich Kühnhackl	5th
(Canada) 1988 Calgary	Xaver Unsinn	Udo Kießling	5th
In 1990, West and East Germany united back to Germany
(France) 1992 Albertville	(Czechoslovakia) Luděk Bukač	Gerd Truntschka	6th
(Norway) 1994 Lillehammer	(Czech Republic) Luděk Bukač	Uli Hiemer	7th
(Japan) 1998 Nagano	(Canada) George Kingston	Dieter Hegen	9th
(United States) 2002 Salt Lake City	Hans Zach	Jürgen Rumrich	8th
(Italy) 2006 Turin	Uwe Krupp	Marcel Goc	10th
(Canada) 2010 Vancouver	Uwe Krupp	Marcel Goc	11th
(Russia) 2014 Sochi	did not qualify		
(South Korea) 2018 Pyeongchang	Marco Sturm	Marcel Goc	Silver
(China) 2022 Beijing	(Finland) Toni Söderholm	Moritz Müller	10th
(Italy) 2026 Milan / Cortina d'Ampezzo	Harold Kreis	Leon Draisaitl	6th

Totals
Games	Gold	Silver	Bronze	Total
16	0	1	2	3

=== World Championship ===
Year	Location	Coach	Result
1930	Chamonix, France / Vienna, Austria / Berlin, Germany	?	Silver
Did not participate in 1931
1933	Prague, Czechoslovakia	?	5th place
1934	Milan, Italy	?	Bronze
1935	Davos, Switzerland	?	9th place
1937	London, Great Britain	?	4th place
1938	Prague, Czechoslovakia	?	4th place
1939	Basel / Zurich, Switzerland	?	5th place
Did not participate between 1947 and 1951
In 1949, Germany was split and was succeeded by West Germany and East Germany
1953	Basel / Zurich, Switzerland	?	Silver
1954	Stockholm, Sweden	?	5th place
1955	Düsseldorf / Dortmund / Krefeld / Cologne, West Germany	?	6th place
Did not participate between 1957 and 1958
1959	Prague / Brno / Ostrava, Czechoslovakia	?	7th place
1961	Geneva / Lausanne, Switzerland	?	8th place
1962	Colorado Springs / Denver, United States	?	6th place
1963	Stockholm, Sweden	?	7th place
1965	Turku / Rauma / Pori, Finland	?	11th place (3rd place in Group B)
1966	Zagreb, Yugoslavia	?	9th place (1st place in Group B)
1967	Vienna, Austria	?	8th place (Relegated)
1969	Ljubljana, Yugoslavia	?	10th place (4th place in Group B)
1970	Bucharest, Romania	?	8th place (2nd place in Group B)
1971	Bern / Geneva, Switzerland	?	5th place
1972	Prague, Czechoslovakia	?	5th place
1973	Moscow, Soviet Union	?	6th place (Relegated)
1974	Ljubljana, Yugoslavia	?	9th place (3rd place in Group B)
1975	Sapporo, Japan	?	8th place (2nd place in Group B)
1976	Katowice, Poland	?	6th place
1977	Vienna, Austria	?	7th place
1978	Prague, Czechoslovakia	?	5th place
1979	Moscow, Soviet Union	?	6th place
1981	Stockholm, Sweden	?	7th place
1982	Helsinki / Tampere, Finland	?	6th place
1983	Munich / Dortmund / Düsseldorf, West Germany	?	5th place
1985	Prague, Czechoslovakia	?	7th place
1986	Moscow, Soviet Union	?	7th place
1987	Vienna, Austria	?	6th place
1989	Stockholm / Södertälje, Sweden	?	7th place
1990	Bern / Fribourg, Switzerland	?	7th place
In 1990, West and East Germany united back to Germany
1991	Turku / Helsinki / Tampere, Finland	Erich Kühnhackl	8th place
1992	Prague / Bratislava, Czechoslovakia	(Czechoslovakia) Luděk Bukač	6th place
1993	Dortmund / Munich, Germany	(Czech Republic) Luděk Bukač	5th place
1994	Bolzano / Canazei / Milan, Italy	(Czech Republic) Luděk Bukač	9th place
1995	Stockholm / Gävle, Sweden	(Canada) George Kingston	9th place
1996	Vienna, Austria	(Canada) George Kingston	8th place
1997	Helsinki / Turku / Tampere, Finland	(Canada) George Kingston	11th place
1998	Zurich / Basel, Switzerland	(Canada) George Kingston	11th place (Relegated)
1999	Odense / Rødovre, Denmark	Hans Zach	20th place (4th place in Pool B)
2000	Katowice / Kraków, Poland	Hans Zach	17th place (Won Pool B)
2001	Cologne / Hanover / Nuremberg, Germany	Hans Zach	8th place
2002	Gothenburg / Karlstad / Jönköping, Sweden	Hans Zach	8th place
2003	Helsinki / Tampere / Turku, Finland	Hans Zach	6th place
2004	Prague / Ostrava, Czech Republic	Hans Zach	9th place
2005	Innsbruck / Vienna, Austria	(United States) Greg Poss	15th place (Relegated)
2006	Amiens, France	Uwe Krupp	17th place (Won Division I, Group A)
2007	Moscow / Mytishchi, Russia	Uwe Krupp	9th place
2008	Quebec City / Halifax, Canada	Uwe Krupp	10th place
2009	Bern / Kloten, Switzerland	Uwe Krupp	15th place
2010	Cologne / Mannheim / Gelsenkirchen, Germany	Uwe Krupp	4th place
2011	Bratislava / Košice, Slovakia	Uwe Krupp	7th place
2012	Helsinki, Finland / Stockholm, Sweden	(Switzerland) Jakob Kölliker	12th place
2013	Stockholm, Sweden / Helsinki, Finland	(Canada) Pat Cortina	9th place
2014	Minsk, Belarus	(Canada) Pat Cortina	14th place
2015	Prague / Ostrava, Czech Republic	(Canada) Pat Cortina	10th place
2016	Moscow / Saint Petersburg, Russia	Marco Sturm	7th place
2017	Cologne, Germany / Paris, France	Marco Sturm	8th place
2018	Copenhagen / Herning, Denmark	Marco Sturm	11th place
2019	Bratislava / Košice, Slovakia	(Finland) Toni Söderholm	6th place
2020	Zurich / Lausanne, Switzerland	Cancelled	
2021	Riga, Latvia	(Finland) Toni Söderholm	4th place
2022	Tampere / Helsinki, Finland	(Finland) Toni Söderholm	7th place
2023	Tampere, Finland / Riga, Latvia	Harold Kreis	Silver
2024	Prague / Ostrava, Czech Republic	Harold Kreis	6th place
2025	Stockholm, Sweden / Herning, Denmark	Harold Kreis	9th place
2026	Zurich / Fribourg, Switzerland	Harold Kreis	10th place
2027	Düsseldorf / Mannheim, Germany		

=== European Championship ===
Year	GP	W	T	L	GF	GA	Finish	Rank
(Switzerland) 1910 Les Avants	3	2	0	1	17	5	Round-robin	2nd place, silver medalist(s)
(German Empire) 1911 Berlin	3	3	0	0	20	1	Round-robin	2nd place, silver medalist(s)
(Austria-Hungary) 1912 Prague*	2	1	1	0	6	3	Round-robin	2nd place, silver medalist(s)
(German Empire) 1913 Munich	3	1	0	2	21	16	Round-robin	3rd place, bronze medalist(s)
(German Empire) 1914 Berlin	2	1	0	1	4	3	Round-robin	2nd place, silver medalist(s)
1915–1920	No championships (World War I)							
1921–1926	Did not participate							
(Austria) 1927 Vienna	5	3	0	2	10	7	Round-robin	3rd place, bronze medalist(s)
(Hungary) 1929 Budapest	2	0	0	2	1	3	First round	8th
(Germany) 1932 Berlin	6	1	4	1	5	5	Final round	4th
1933–1991	After 1932, the European Championship medals were awarded based on the results of the Ice Hockey World Championships, with Germany receiving Gold in 1930 and 1934							

- 1912 Championship was later annulled because Austria was not a member of the IIHF at the time of the competition.

=== World Cup of Hockey ===
- 1996 – lost in quarterfinals
- 2004 – lost in quarterfinals
- 2016 – Not invited (six German players played for Team Europe and won the silver medal)

=== Canada Cup ===
- 1984 – Finished in 6th place

=== Other tournaments ===
- Deutschland Cup: (gold) Gold medal (1995, 1996, 2009, 2010, 2012, 2014, 2015, 2021, 2022, 2023, 2025)
- Nissan Cup: (gold) Gold medal (1993)

== Team ==
=== Current roster ===
Roster for the 2026 IIHF World Championship.

Head coach: Harold Kreis

No.	Pos.	Name	Height	Weight	Birthdate	Team
1	G	Jonas Stettmer	1.96 m (6 ft 5 in)	101 kg (223 lb)	9 October 2001 (age 25)	(Germany) ERC Ingolstadt
6	D	Kai Wissmann – A	1.90 m (6 ft 3 in)	88 kg (194 lb)	22 October 1996 (age 30)	(Germany) Eisbären Berlin
7	F	Maximilian Kastner	1.80 m (5 ft 11 in)	84 kg (185 lb)	3 January 1993 (age 33)	(Germany) EHC Red Bull München
9	D	Leon Gawanke	1.86 m (6 ft 1 in)	90 kg (200 lb)	31 May 1999 (age 27)	(Germany) Adler Mannheim
12	D	Eric Mik	1.82 m (6 ft 0 in)	83 kg (183 lb)	28 February 2000 (age 26)	(Germany) Eisbären Berlin
15	F	Stefan Loibl	1.86 m (6 ft 1 in)	83 kg (183 lb)	24 June 1996 (age 30)	(Germany) Straubing Tigers
21	F	Nico Krämmer	1.86 m (6 ft 1 in)	89 kg (196 lb)	23 October 1992 (age 34)	(Germany) Fischtown Pinguins
25	D	Leon Hüttl	1.82 m (6 ft 0 in)	80 kg (180 lb)	21 September 2000 (age 26)	(Germany) ERC Ingolstadt
30	G	Philipp Grubauer	1.85 m (6 ft 1 in)	84 kg (185 lb)	25 November 1991 (age 34)	(United States) Seattle Kraken
37	G	Maximilian Franzreb	1.83 m (6 ft 0 in)	98 kg (216 lb)	18 August 1996 (age 30)	(Germany) Adler Mannheim
38	D	Fabio Wagner	1.82 m (6 ft 0 in)	83 kg (183 lb)	17 September 1995 (age 31)	(Germany) EHC Red Bull München
40	F	Alexander Ehl	1.75 m (5 ft 9 in)	76 kg (168 lb)	28 November 1999 (age 26)	(Germany) Adler Mannheim
43	F	Andreas Eder	1.89 m (6 ft 2 in)	91 kg (201 lb)	20 March 1996 (age 30)	(Germany) EHC Red Bull München
44	F	Josh Samanski	1.90 m (6 ft 3 in)	91 kg (201 lb)	22 March 2002 (age 24)	(Canada) Edmonton Oilers
47	F	Alexander Karachun	1.88 m (6 ft 2 in)	92 kg (203 lb)	3 March 1995 (age 31)	(Germany) Schwenninger Wild Wings
48	D	Phillip Sinn	1.88 m (6 ft 2 in)	87 kg (192 lb)	13 January 2004 (age 22)	(Germany) EHC Red Bull München
53	D	Moritz Seider – C	1.92 m (6 ft 4 in)	90 kg (200 lb)	6 April 2001 (age 25)	(United States) Detroit Red Wings
56	F	Manuel Wiederer	1.83 m (6 ft 0 in)	82 kg (181 lb)	21 November 1996 (age 29)	(Germany) Eisbären Berlin
62	F	Parker Tuomie	1.76 m (5 ft 9 in)	77 kg (170 lb)	31 October 1995 (age 31)	(Germany) Fischtown Pinguins
64	D	Marcus Weber	1.88 m (6 ft 2 in)	82 kg (181 lb)	2 November 1992 (age 34)	(Germany) Nürnberg Ice Tigers
65	F	Marc Michaelis	1.77 m (5 ft 10 in)	79 kg (174 lb)	31 July 1995 (age 31)	(Germany) Adler Mannheim
71	F	Daniel Fischbuch	1.80 m (5 ft 11 in)	80 kg (180 lb)	19 August 1993 (age 33)	(Germany) Kölner Haie
72	F	Dominik Kahun	1.80 m (5 ft 11 in)	79 kg (174 lb)	2 July 1995 (age 31)	(Switzerland) Lausanne HC
73	F	Lukas Reichel	1.83 m (6 ft 0 in)	78 kg (172 lb)	17 May 2002 (age 24)	(United States) Boston Bruins
75	F	Samuel Dove-McFalls	1.88 m (6 ft 2 in)	94 kg (207 lb)	10 April 1997 (age 29)	(Germany) Nürnberg Ice Tigers
95	F	Frederik Tiffels – A	1.83 m (6 ft 0 in)	87 kg (192 lb)	20 May 1995 (age 31)	(Germany) Eisbären Berlin

=== 2026 Olympics roster ===
The first six players of Germany's roster were announced on 16 June 2025. The remainder of the roster was named on 7 January 2026. On 9 February, Leon Draisaitl was named Germany's captain, with Moritz Seider and Tim Stützle serving as alternate captains.

Head coach: Harold Kreis

No.	Pos.	Name	Height	Weight	Birthdate	Team
6	D	Kai Wissmann	1.93 m (6 ft 4 in)	94 kg (207 lb)	22 October 1996 (aged 29)	(Germany) Eisbären Berlin
8	F	Tobias Rieder	1.80 m (5 ft 11 in)	86 kg (190 lb)	10 January 1993 (aged 33)	(Germany) EHC Red Bull München
9	D	Leon Gawanke	1.85 m (6 ft 1 in)	90 kg (198 lb)	31 May 1999 (aged 26)	(Germany) Adler Mannheim
11	D	Korbinian Geibel	1.83 m (6 ft 0 in)	91 kg (201 lb)	8 July 2002 (aged 23)	(Germany) Eisbären Berlin
18	F	Tim Stützle – A	1.83 m (6 ft 0 in)	87 kg (192 lb)	15 January 2002 (aged 24)	(Canada) Ottawa Senators
19	F	Wojciech Stachowiak	1.85 m (6 ft 1 in)	85 kg (187 lb)	3 July 1999 (aged 26)	(United States) Syracuse Crunch
29	F	Leon Draisaitl – C	1.88 m (6 ft 2 in)	96 kg (212 lb)	27 October 1995 (aged 30)	(Canada) Edmonton Oilers
30	G	Philipp Grubauer	1.85 m (6 ft 1 in)	88 kg (194 lb)	25 November 1991 (aged 34)	(United States) Seattle Kraken
35	G	Mathias Niederberger	1.80 m (5 ft 11 in)	79 kg (174 lb)	3 January 1993 (aged 33)	(Germany) EHC Red Bull München
37	G	Maximilian Franzreb	1.83 m (6 ft 0 in)	90 kg (198 lb)	18 August 1996 (aged 29)	(Germany) Adler Mannheim
38	D	Fabio Wagner	1.85 m (6 ft 1 in)	83 kg (183 lb)	17 September 1995 (aged 30)	(Germany) EHC Red Bull München
40	F	Alexander Ehl	1.75 m (5 ft 9 in)	80 kg (176 lb)	8 November 1999 (aged 26)	(Germany) Adler Mannheim
41	D	Jonas Müller	1.83 m (6 ft 0 in)	92 kg (203 lb)	19 October 1995 (aged 30)	(Germany) Eisbären Berlin
44	F	Josh Samanski	1.91 m (6 ft 3 in)	91 kg (201 lb)	22 March 2002 (aged 23)	(United States) Bakersfield Condors
49	D	Lukas Kälble	1.85 m (6 ft 1 in)	93 kg (205 lb)	13 October 1997 (aged 28)	(Germany) Adler Mannheim
53	D	Moritz Seider – A	1.93 m (6 ft 4 in)	90 kg (198 lb)	6 April 2001 (aged 24)	(United States) Detroit Red Wings
62	F	Parker Tuomie	1.78 m (5 ft 10 in)	84 kg (185 lb)	31 October 1995 (aged 30)	(Germany) Kölner Haie
65	F	Marc Michaelis	1.80 m (5 ft 11 in)	85 kg (187 lb)	31 July 1995 (aged 30)	(Germany) Adler Mannheim
72	F	Dominik Kahun	1.80 m (5 ft 11 in)	79 kg (174 lb)	2 July 1995 (aged 30)	(Switzerland) Lausanne HC
73	F	Lukas Reichel	1.83 m (6 ft 0 in)	85 kg (187 lb)	17 May 2002 (aged 23)	(Canada) Abbotsford Canucks
74	F	Justin Schütz	1.80 m (5 ft 11 in)	86 kg (190 lb)	24 June 2000 (aged 25)	(Germany) Adler Mannheim
77	F	JJ Peterka	1.80 m (5 ft 11 in)	85 kg (187 lb)	14 January 2002 (aged 24)	(United States) Utah Mammoth
78	F	Nico Sturm	1.91 m (6 ft 3 in)	94 kg (207 lb)	3 May 1995 (aged 30)	(United States) Minnesota Wild
91	D	Moritz Müller	1.88 m (6 ft 2 in)	92 kg (203 lb)	19 November 1986 (aged 39)	(Germany) Kölner Haie
95	F	Frederik Tiffels	1.83 m (6 ft 0 in)	92 kg (203 lb)	20 May 1995 (aged 30)	(Germany) Eisbären Berlin

=== Retired numbers ===
- 20 – Robert Dietrich
- 80 - Robert Müller

=== Notable players ===
- Leon Draisaitl
- Rudi Ball
- Christian Ehrhoff
- Karl Friesen
- Marcel Goc
- Thomas Greiss
- Philipp Grubauer
- Jochen Hecht
- Dieter Hegen
- Gustav Jaenecke
- Udo Kießling
- Ralph Krueger
- Patrick Reimer
- Olaf Kölzig
- Erich Kühnhackl
- Uwe Krupp (also former head coach)
- Robert Müller
- Helmut de Raaf
- Hans Rampf
- Dennis Seidenberg
- Alois Schloder
- Marco Sturm (also former head coach)
- Xaver Unsinn (also former head coach)

=== Notable executives ===
- Heinz Henschel, president of the German Ice Sport Federation
- Wolf-Dieter Montag, team physician
- Roman Neumayer, sport director for the German Ice Hockey Federation

== Uniform evolution ==
National team jerseys

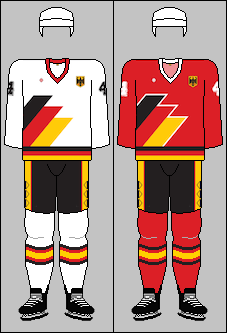
(West Germany) 1988 Olympic jerseys

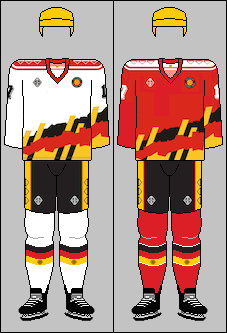
1992 Olympic jerseys

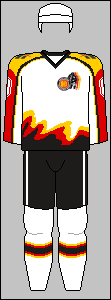
1994 Olympic jersey

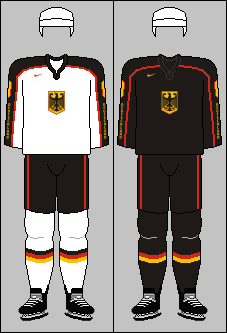
1998 Olympic jerseys

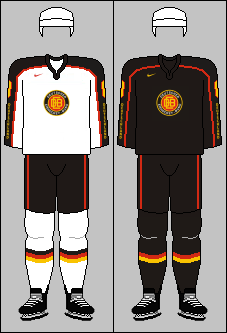
1999-2000 IIHF jerseys

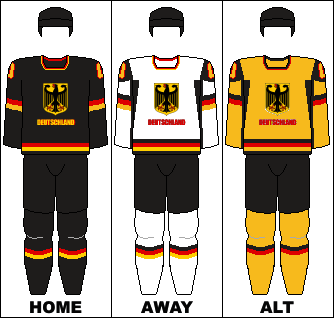
former IIHF jerseys

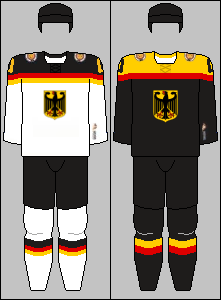
2014–2017 IIHF jerseys

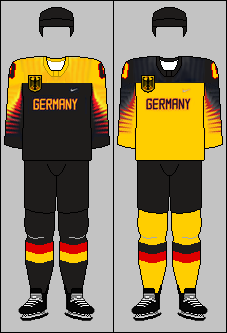
2018 Olympic jerseys

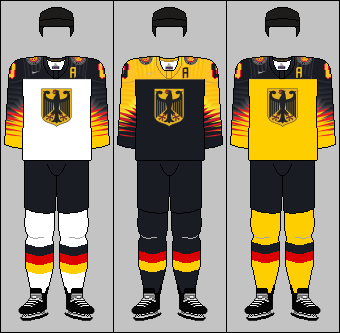
2018–2021 IIHF jerseys

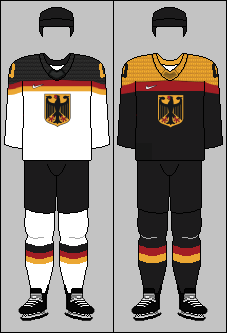
2022 Olympic jerseys

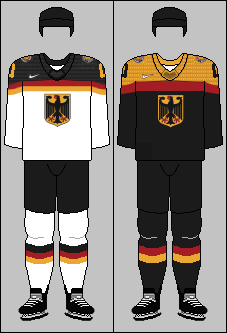
2022– IIHF jerseys

== All-time record ==
As of 8 November 2025.

Opponent	Played	Won	Drawn	Lost	GF	GA	GD
Australia	1	1	0	0	15	1	+14
Austria	57	38	4	15	187	91	+96
Belarus	29	10	2	17	69	83	-14
Belgium	14	9	1	4	69	32	+37
Bohemia	4	0	1	3	5	12	-7
Bulgaria	1	1	0	0	13	1	+12
Canada	132	19	7	106	251	674	-423
China	1	1	0	0	3	2	+1
Czech Republic	59	8	2	49	117	243	−126
Czechoslovakia	65	10	6	49	120	364	−244
Denmark	30	19	0	11	90	67	+23
East Germany	20	12	4	4	73	54	+19
England	10	6	1	3	40	23	+17
Estonia	2	2	0	0	7	3	+4
Finland	122	26	14	82	309	537	−228
France	47	27	4	16	138	97	+41
Great Britain	15	11	1	3	65	26	+39
Hungary	23	18	4	1	78	33	+45
Israel	1	1	0	0	11	2	+9
Italy	59	33	9	17	230	157	+73
Japan	23	21	0	2	138	57	+81
Kazakhstan	12	7	0	5	40	27	+13
Latvia	42	23	4	15	109	97	+12
Netherlands	11	10	1	0	79	23	+56
Norway	50	34	2	14	243	147	+96
Poland	54	31	7	16	192	161	+31
Protectorate of Bohemia and Moravia	1	0	0	1	1	5	−4
Romania	21	17	0	4	100	57	+43
Russia	33	5	3	25	62	111	−49
Serbia and Montenegro	1	1	0	0	14	0	+14
Slovakia	87	38	2	47	206	234	-28
Slovenia	11	8	2	1	41	15	+26
South Korea	2	2	0	0	10	4	+6
Soviet Union	71	0	1	70	111	581	-470
Sweden	112	12	5	95	200	523	−323
Switzerland	161	72	16	73	528	456	+72
Ukraine	7	3	2	2	18	15	+3
United States	115	31	9	75	316	457	−141
Yugoslavia	33	21	5	7	173	111	+62
Total	1 537	587	119	832	4 467	5 572	-1 099

== See also ==
- Germany men's national ice sledge hockey team
- East Germany national ice hockey team
