= Wolf-Dieter Montag =

German physician and sports administrator (1924–2018)

- Born: 10 December 1924; Bamberg, Germany
- Died: 21 July 2018 (aged 93); Riegsee, Germany
- Education: University of Bamberg; University of Erlangen–Nuremberg; University of Vienna; LMU Munich
- Occupations: Physician; mountain rescue; sports medicine specialist
- Years active: 1952 – 2002
- Known for: German Ice Skating Union president; International Skating Union and International Olympic Committee medical advisor; International Ice Hockey Federation Chief Medical Officer
- Awards: Federal Cross of Merit; Bavarian Order of Merit; Olympic Order; Paul Loicq Award; German Ice Hockey Hall of Fame

Wolf-Dieter Montag (10 December 1924 – 21 July 2018) was a German physician, sports medicine specialist, mountain rescue doctor, and international sports administrator. His medical career spanned 50 years in his native Bavaria, and included being a lecturer, teacher and consultant for orthopedic surgery, and physical therapy. He served as vice-president of the German Sport Medical Association, advised the Landtag of Bavaria on medical matters, and was a mountain rescue doctor and instructor for 30 years. He was the chief physician of the German Ice Skating Union for eight years, then was its president for 16 years. He was a medical advisor to the International Skating Union for 10 years, served as the Chief Medical Officer of the International Ice Hockey Federation for 23 years, and was a member of the medical committee for the International Olympic Committee at all Summer and Winter Olympic Games from 1972 to 2002. He received multiple awards during his career, including the Order of Merit of the Federal Republic of Germany first class, the Bavarian Order of Merit, the Olympic Order, induction into the German Ice Hockey Hall of Fame, and the inaugural Paul Loicq Award.

== Early life and education ==
Montag was born on 10 December 1924 in Bamberg, Germany. He completed undergraduate studies in philosophy and theology at the University of Bamberg. He went on to study medicine at University of Bamberg, University of Erlangen–Nuremberg, University of Vienna, and LMU Munich. He passed the state doctor's examination on 5 May 1952, and was promoted to a Doctor of Medicine on 6 May 1952.

== Medical career ==
Montag was associated primarily with institutions in Bavaria during his career. He worked at hospitals in Vilsbiburg, Rosenheim, and Murnau am Staffelsee, and practiced as a sports doctor in Munich and Weilheim from 1956 to 1990. He also served as an assistant to Fritz Lange at the Klinikum Harlaching, part of LMU Munich. He also lectured, taught and consulted for orthopedic surgery, sports medicine, and physical therapy.

At the national level, Montag was involved in the renaming of the German Orthopedic Society (Deutsche Orthopädische Gesellschaft) into the German Society for Orthopedic Traumatological Sports Medicine (Deutsche Gesellschaft für Orthopädisch-Traumatologische Sportmedizin) in 1962. He was a founding member of the German Society for Sports Physiotherapy in 1973, to further the education of sport physiotherapists in preparation for the 1976 Winter Olympics in Innsbruck, and the 1976 Summer Olympics in Montreal. He later served as the first vice-president of German Sport Medical Association from 1976 to 1980. He organized the 32nd German Sports Medicine Congress in Munich in 1990, and joined the sports medicine advisory board for Bayer in 1990.

Montag was a member of many institutions in his native state of Bavaria during his career. He was a member of the mountain rescue standby team in Weilheim, as a rescue doctor and an instructor from 1960 to 1990. He became executive director of Bavarian Sports Medical Association in 1972, and the treasurer of the Bavarian Sports Doctors Association in 1975. He also served on the sports medicine advisory board to the Landtag of Bavaria from 1976 to 1998. He was a lecturer for orthopedics, sports medicine and sports physiotherapy at the Sebastian Kneipp school in Bad Wörishofen from 1980 to 2000, and was president of the Bavarian Association of Sports Physicians from 1988 to 1998.

== Sports administrator ==
Montag became the chief physician for the German Ice Skating Union, and the German Ice Sport Federation in 1972. In these roles he oversaw medical concerns for figure skating events hosted in Germany; which included the 1973 European Figure Skating Championships, the 1980 World Figure Skating Championships, and the 1983 European Figure Skating Championships. He was the team doctor for the West Germany men's national ice hockey team, and the primary physician for West German athletes at the 1972, 1976, and 1980 Winter Olympics.

Montag served as president of the German Ice Skating Union from 1980 to 1996. In 1980, he opened the West German national figure skating training center in Oberstdorf. He presided over the 1983 European Figure Skating Championships hosted in Dortmund, and served as vice-president of the German Ice Sports Federation in 1988. He also acted as head of delegation for West Germany at the 1984 Winter Olympics, and led the West German delegation in figure skating at the 1988 Winter Olympics, the 1991 World Figure Skating Championships, and the 1995 European Figure Skating Championships.

From 1974 to 1984, Montag acted as the medical advisor to the International Skating Union, which included overseeing medical concerns at the European Figure Skating Championships, the World Figure Skating Championships, and speed skating at the 1980 Winter Olympics. He advised against starting the races over 1,500 metres (4,900 ft) in distance at the outdoor James B. Sheffield Olympic Skating Rink in 1980, when temperatures dropped below −20 °C (−4 °F) and exposed athletes to frostbite.

From 1975 to 1998, Montag served as the Chief Medical Officer (CMO) of the International Ice Hockey Federation (IIHF). He oversaw medical concerns at all Ice Hockey World Championships, and many of the corresponding Ice Hockey World Junior Championships during his tenure. At the 1978 IIHF general congress, he advocated for full face protection on hockey helmets for players, to reduce face and eye injuries at the World Junior Championships. He also oversaw doping in sport testing for IIHF events. Canadian doctor Mark Aubry followed Montag as the CMO for the IIHF in 1998.

Montag was a member of the medical committee for the International Olympic Committee (IOC) at all Summer and Winter Olympic Games from 1972 to 2002. He was part of the IOC commission for women's sport, the IOC's commission to control doping in sport, and coordinating committee for the 1998 Winter Olympics in Nagano. He also raised concerns at the 1992 Winter Olympics regarding the 1,200 metres (3,900 ft) elevation difference between the Olympic Village in Brides-les-Bains and the Méribel Ice Palace, with respect to the endurance of the hockey players.

== Later life and death ==
Montag retired in 2002. He later lived in the foothills of Upper Bavaria, and made his final residence in Riegsee. He died at home on 21 July 2018, at age 93.

== Awards and honors ==
In 1975, Montag received an honorary diploma from the IIHF, and the golden badge of honor with diamonds from the German Ice Sport Federation. He was a given a golden figure skating medal from the Finnish Amateur Athletic Association in 1983, and the golden badge of honor from the German Ice Skating Union in 1984. He was honored by the French Minister of Youth and Sport in 1985, with the Ordre du Mérite sportif of France. In 1987, Montag was given an honorary diploma from the University of Tokushima, a medal from the Osaka University, and a diploma of honor from the Japanese Orthopedic Society of Sports Medicine (JOSSM). He was made an honorary member of the JOSSM in 1988, and received honors from the Western Pacific Orthopedic Association in 1989.

Montag was honored with the Order of Merit of the Federal Republic of Germany first class in 1996, for his work in national sports and sports medicine. He was the inaugural recipient of the Paul Loicq Award in 1998, in recognition of "outstanding contributions to the IIHF and international ice hockey". During the opening ceremony of the 1998 Winter Olympics he received the Olympic Order for his work with the Olympic Games and sports medicine. Later in the same year, he was awarded the golden badge of honor by the German Sports Medical Association. Montag received the Bavarian Order of Merit in 2000, for his work in sports administration and sports medicine, and was inducted in the German Ice Hockey Hall of Fame in 2008.

Other honors include receiving a silver decoration from the Bavarian Mountain Rescue, an honorary diploma from the Bavarian Wounded Sports Federation, and being named an honorary president of the Bavarian Sports Doctors Association.

== Bibliography ==
- "Wolf-Dieter Montag – Curriculum Vitae" (PDF). Gesellschaft für Orthopädisch-Traumatologische Sportmedizin (in German). 19 November 2014. Archived (PDF) from the original on 12 November 2018.
