= Hans Zach =

German ice hockey player and coach (born 1949)

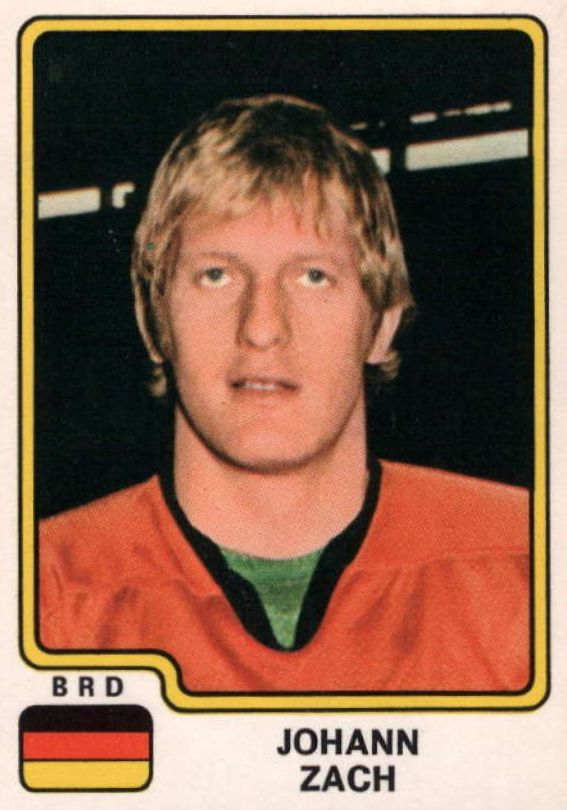
- Born: 30 March 1949 (age 77) Bad Tölz, Germany
- Position: Centre
- Played for: EC Bad Tölz (Bundesliga); SC Riessersee (Bundesliga); Berliner SC (Bundesliga); EV Landshut (Bundesliga); SB Rosenheim (Bundesliga)
- National team: West Germany
- Playing career: 1967–1984

Hans Zach (born 30 March 1949) is a German ice hockey player and coach. During his playing career he played for five different clubs in the Eishockey-Bundesliga, EC Bad Tölz, SC Riessersee, Berliner SC, EV Landshut and SB Rosenheim. He also represented the German national team in four Ice Hockey World Championships in 1976, 1977, 1978 and 1979 as well as at the 1980 Winter Olympics.

As coach he was in charge of the EC Ratingen, SV Bayreuth, Düsseldorfer EG, Kassel Huskies, Zürcher SC, Kölner Haie, and the Hannover Scorpions. His greatest success came with Düsseldorfer EG, who he won three national titles with from 1991 to 1993. From 1998 to 2004 he coached the German national ice hockey team.

After a period in retirement following his championship-winning season in 2009–10 with the Hannover Scorpions Zach returned to coaching on 1 January 2014 when he took over as coach of Adler Mannheim, signing a contract until the end of the 2013–14 season.

He is a member of the German Ice Hockey Hall of Fame.

== Honours ==
- Eishockey-Bundesliga
  - Champions: (5) 1975–76, 1981–82, 1990–91, 1991–92, 1992–93
- Deutsche Eishockey Liga
  - Champions: (1) 2009–10
- Ice Hockey World Championships
  - Participant: (4) 1976, 1977, 1978, 1979
- Olympic ice hockey tournament
  - Participant: (1) 1980
