= Spatzenhausen =

- Municipality
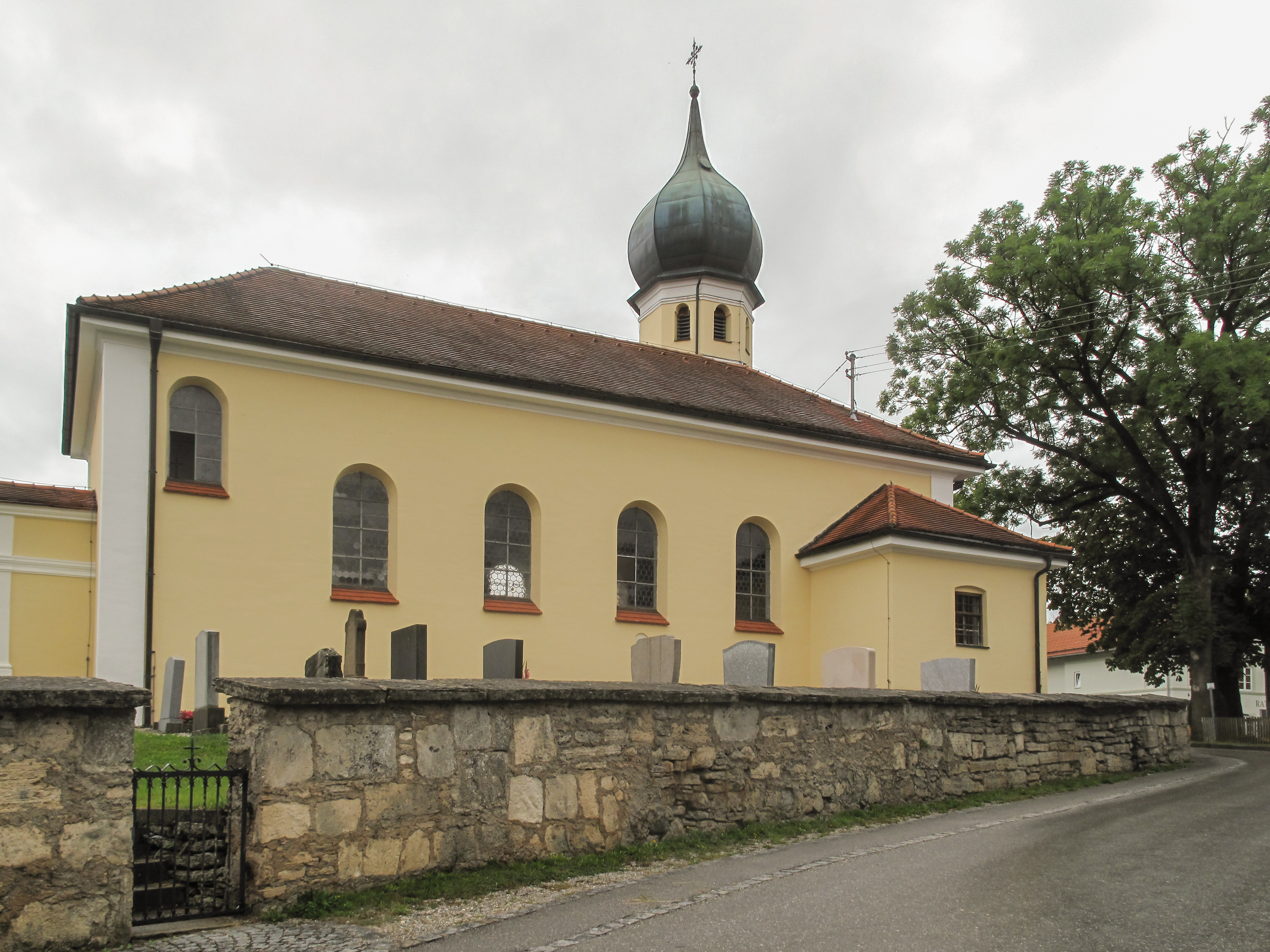
- Church of Saint Afra

- Coat of arms

- Location of Spatzenhausen within Garmisch-Partenkirchen district
- Interactive map of Spatzenhausen
- Location within Germany Location within Bavaria
- Coordinates: 47°43′N 11°12′E
- Country: Germany
- State: Bavaria
- Admin. region: Oberbayern
- District: Garmisch-Partenkirchen
- Municipal assoc.: Seehausen am Staffelsee

Government
  - Mayor (2020–26): Aloisia Gastl (FW)

Area
  - Total: 7.74 km^{2} (2.99 sq mi)
- Elevation: 667 m (2,188 ft)

Population (2025-12-31)
  - Total: 745
  - Density: 96.3/km^{2} (249/sq mi)
- Time zone: UTC+01:00 (CET)
  - Summer (DST): UTC+02:00 (CEST)
- Postal codes: 82447
- Dialling codes: 08847
- Vehicle registration: GAP
- Website: www.spatzenhausen.de

Spatzenhausen is a municipality in the district of Garmisch-Partenkirchen, in Bavaria, Germany.
