= Seehausen am Staffelsee =

- Municipality
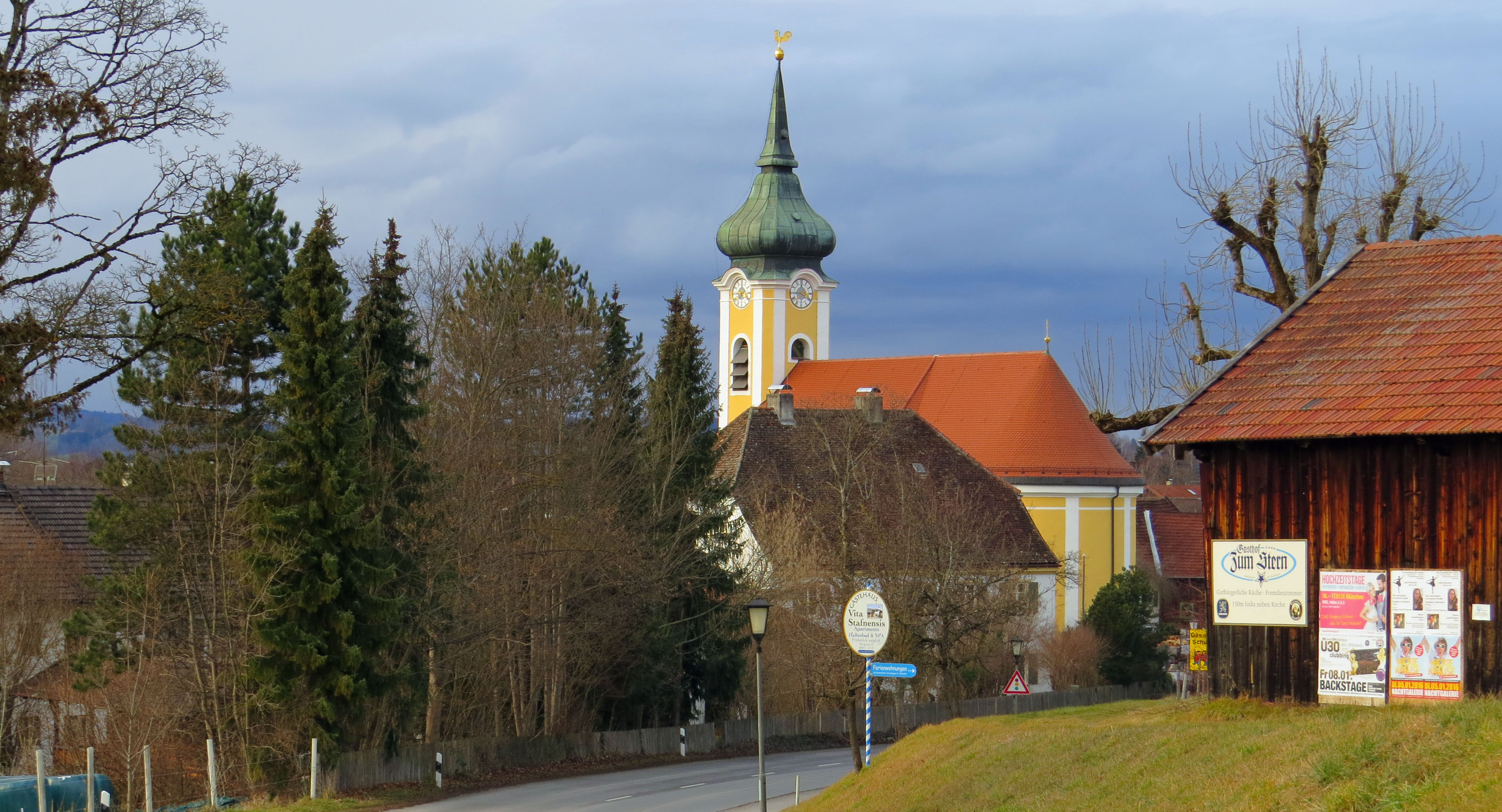
- Church of Saint Michael

- Coat of arms

- Location of Seehausen am Staffelsee within Garmisch-Partenkirchen district
- Interactive map of Seehausen am Staffelsee
- Location within Germany Location within Bavaria
- Coordinates: 47°41′N 11°11′E
- Country: Germany
- State: Bavaria
- Admin. region: Oberbayern
- District: Garmisch-Partenkirchen
- Municipal assoc.: Seehausen am Staffelsee

Government
  - Mayor: Karl Widmann (Parteifreie Wählergruppe Seehausen)

Area
  - Total: 15.71 km^{2} (6.07 sq mi)
- Elevation: 655 m (2,149 ft)

Population (2025-12-31)
  - Total: 2,434
  - Density: 154.9/km^{2} (401.3/sq mi)
- Time zone: UTC+01:00 (CET)
  - Summer (DST): UTC+02:00 (CEST)
- Postal codes: 82418
- Dialling codes: 08841
- Vehicle registration: GAP
- Website: www.seehausen-am-staffelsee.de

Seehausen am Staffelsee is a municipality in the district of Garmisch-Partenkirchen, in Bavaria, Germany. The main village, Seehausen, lies on the eastern shore of the Staffelsee lake.

== Notable people ==
- Bolko von Richthofen (1899–1983) archaeologist, died in Seehausen am Staffelsee
- Karl Michael Vogler (1928–2009) actor, died in Seehausen am Staffelsee
