= Paul Ambros =

German ice hockey player

- Born: 22 June 1934; Füssen, Germany
- Died: 26 June 2015 (aged 82); Füssen, Germany
- Height: 5 ft 9 in (175 cm)
- Weight: 170 lb (77 kg; 12 st 2 lb)
- Position: Defence
- Shot: Right
- Played for: EV Füssen; United Team of Germany
- National team: Germany
- Playing career: 1955–1973

Paul Ambros (22 June 1934 – 26 June 2015) was a German ice hockey player. He was part of the United Team of Germany, which represented the country at the 1956, 1960 and 1964 Winter Olympics.

Born in Füssen, Germany, Ambros played for EV Füssen from 1949 until 1965, scoring more than 60 goals in 200 games and helping his team win the Spengler Cup in 1965. He then played for Augsburger EV from 1965 until 1973. He was often referred as "Der Tiger vom Hopfensee (The Tiger from Hopfensee)".

Ambros is a member of the German Ice Hockey Hall of Fame.

Ambros died on 26 June 2015 at the age of 82, following a lengthy undisclosed illness. He is survived by his wife, Inge.
