= Hans Rampf =

German ice hockey player

Johannes Rampf (February 2, 1931, in Bad Tölz, Germany – May 5, 2001) was a German ice hockey player. He participated at the 1956 Winter Olympics and 1960 Winter Olympics. He was inducted into the International Ice Hockey Federation Hall of Fame in 2001.

== Career ==
He played for the German national ice hockey team during the 1956 Winter Olympics when Germany competed as the Unified team of Germany and finished in 6th place. In the 1960 games, the team had the same result. He also played for the club team EC Bad Tolz in Germany.

In the 1980 Winter Olympics, Hans Rampf coached the West German team throughout 5 games in the First Round. Although the team did not repeat the shock of the Bronze medal won by the 1976 Olympic team, they did have some good games, where they took on the USA team, which eventually won the gold medal and only lost 4-2 and against Norway where they won 10–4.

The team finished with a 1-4-0 record and finished overall in tenth place out of twelve, in front of Norway and Japan.
