= Otto Schneitberger =

German ice hockey player

Personal information
- Nationality: German
- Born: 29 September 1939 (age 85); Gaißach, Germany

Sport
- Sport: Ice hockey

Otto Schneitberger (born 29 September 1939) is a German former ice hockey player. He competed in the men's tournaments at the 1960, the 1964, the 1968, and the 1972 Winter Olympics.
