= Pat Cortina =

Canadian ice hockey coach (born 1964)

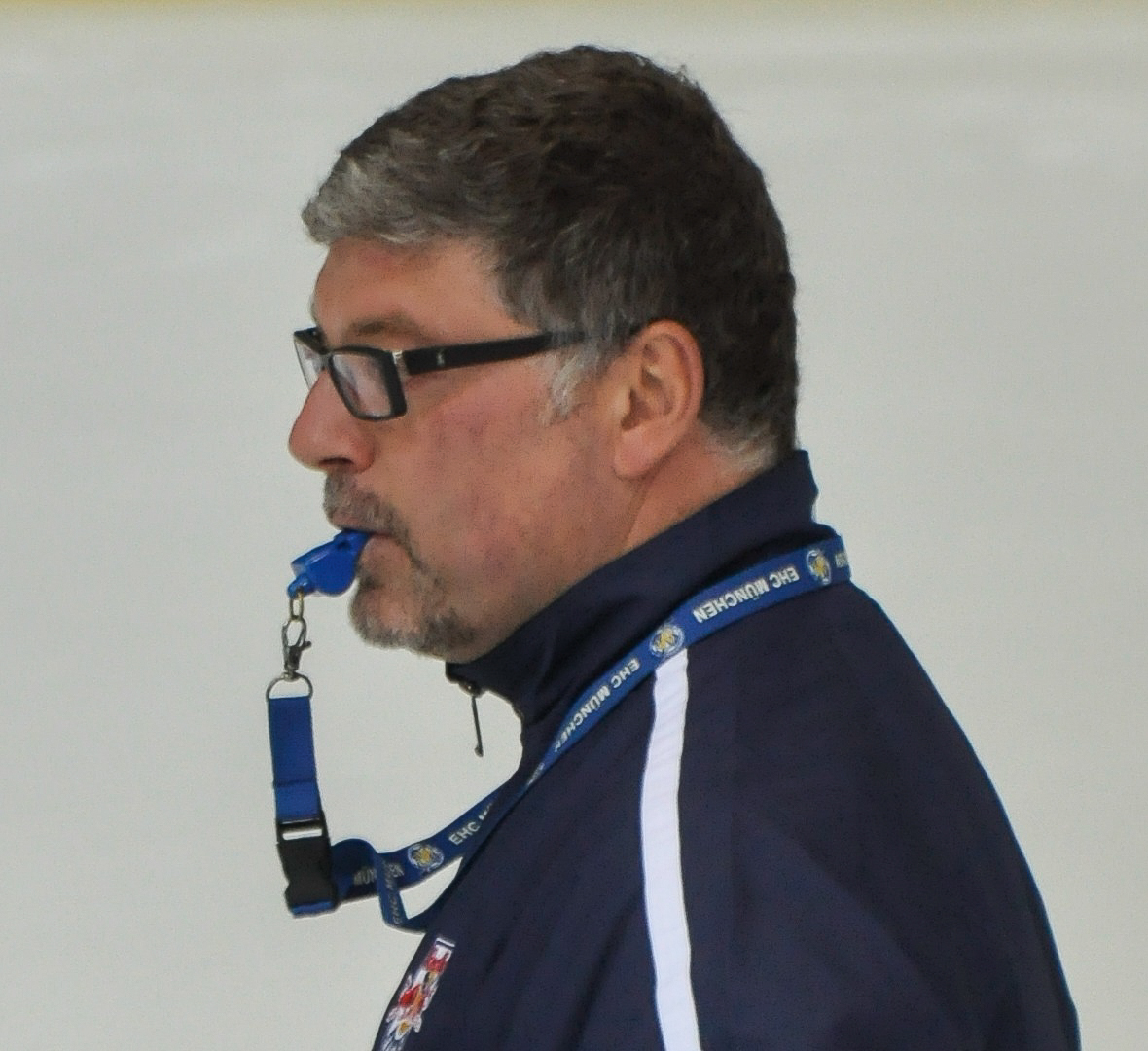
- Born: September 4, 1964 (age 62)

Pasqualino "Pat" Cortina (born 4 September 1964) is a Canadian-born Italian ice hockey coach who has coached several club and national teams in Europe since the 1990s. He is serving as head coach of the SC Riessersee in Germany.

== Career ==
Cortina was born in Montreal, Quebec, Canada. He has coached the Italian national team as well as Serie A teams HC Varese and HC Asiago. Cortina coached Hungarian ice hockey club Alba Volán Székesfehérvár from 2003 to 2006 (winning the Hungarian Nationwide Championship three times), German team EHC München in 2006–07 and HC Innsbruck of the Austrian Hockey League in 2007–08. From 2003 to 2009, he also coached the Hungarian national team, which they reached the top division of the IIHF World Championships in 2008, under Cortina's tenure, for the first time in seventy years.

In 2008, Cortina returned to EHC München, leading the team to a second-place finish in the 2008-09 2nd Bundesliga season. In 2010, he and his team won the German Cup and the 2nd Bundesliga championship, earning them promotion to the Deutsche Eishockey Liga.

Following these successes, Cortina's contract with EHC München was extended to 2012 and, after a successful 2010–11 DEL season, by two additional years until 2014. In 2012, Cortina took over as coach for the German national team, signing a three-year contract. At the same time, he continued to coach EHC München for the 2012–13 season.

Following the 2015 World Championships he did not have his contract with the German ice hockey federation renewed.

In April 2016, the Schwenninger Wild Wings of the Deutsche Eishockey Liga (DEL) appointed Cortina as their new head coach. He was sacked in late October 2018, after collecting only seven points in the first 15 games of the 2018-19 season. Cortina signed with the Grizzlys Wolfsburg in March 2019, taking over the head coaching job at the DEL team at the beginning of the 2019-20 season.

Cortina received the Paul Loicq Award in 2026, for contributions to the International Ice Hockey Federation and international ice hockey.
