= The Green Book (Gaddafi) =

1975 political philosophy book by Muammar Gaddafi

- English language cover for The Green Book published January 1, 2008 by Ithaca Press
- Author: Muammar Gaddafi
- Original title: الكتاب الأخضر
- Language: Arabic
- Subject: Political philosophy
- Publisher: People's Establishment for Publication, Distribution, and Advertising
- Publication date: 1975
- Publication place: Libya
- English publication date: 1976
- Media type: Print
- Pages: 110
- ISBN: 978-1-54124-131-2
- LC Class: DT236 .Q244413

The Green Book (Arabic: الكتاب الأخضر al-Kitāb al-Aḫḍar) is a short book setting out the political philosophy of Libyan leader Muammar Gaddafi. The book was first published in 1975. It is said to have been inspired in part by The Little Red Book (Quotations from Chairman Mao Tse-tung). Both were widely distributed both inside and outside Libya, and "written in a simple, understandable style with many memorable slogans".

An English translation was issued by the People's Establishment for Publication, Distribution, and Advertising, an organ of the Libyan People's Committee, and a bilingual English-Arabic edition was issued in London by Martin, Brian & O'Keeffe in 1976.

During the First Libyan Civil War in 2011, during which Gaddafi himself was killed, copies of the book were burned by anti-Gaddafi demonstrators, and monuments to The Green Book demolished.

== Influence ==
=== In Libya ===
According to British author and former Greater London Council member George Tremlett, Libyan children spent two hours a week studying the book as part of their curriculum. Extracts were broadcast every day on television and radio. Its slogans were also found on billboards and painted on buildings in Libya.

=== International ===
By 1993, lectures and seminars on The Green Book had been held at universities and colleges in France, Eastern Europe, Colombia, and Venezuela.

On a state visit to Libya in 2008, socialist Bolivian President Evo Morales cited the Green Book as a major influence on his political beliefs and policies.

== Contents ==
The Green Book consists of three parts and has 110 pages:

- The Solution of the Problem of Democracy: The Authority of the People (published in late 1975)
- The Solution of the Economic Problem: Socialism (published in early 1977)
- The Social Basis of the Third International Theory (published in September 1981)

=== Views ===
The Green Book rejects both capitalism and communism, as well as representative democracy. Instead, it proposes a type of direct democracy overseen by the General People's Committee which allows direct political participation for all adult citizens.

The book states that "Freedom of expression is the natural right of every person, even if they choose to behave irrationally, to express his or her insanity." The Green Book states that freedom of speech is based upon public ownership of book publishers, newspapers, television, and radio stations, on the grounds that private ownership would be undemocratic.

A paragraph in the book about abolishing money is similar to a paragraph in Friedrich Engels' Principles of Communism. Gaddafi wrote: "The final step is when the new socialist society reaches the stage where profit and money disappear. It is through transforming society into a fully productive society, and through reaching in production a level where the material needs of the members of society are satisfied. On that final stage, profit will automatically disappear and there will be no need for money."

== Summary ==
The following table gives a chapter-by-chapter summary of the book.

Part	Chapter	Title	Summary
I	1	The Instrument of Government	The most important political question is "what form of government should be established?" Such a government should be a direct democracy, but what usually occurs is that representative democracies are established, which usurp the will of large populations who did not vote for existing governments, using first-past-the-post electoral systems.
I	2	Parliaments	The basic feature of a representative democracy is its parliament, or assembly. Once elected, members usurp the authority of their constituents for their term of service.
I	3	The Party	Political parties themselves also usurp the people's authority, and focus on maintaining power instead of improving society for all, the proper object of government. Worse, political parties are susceptible to corruption.
I	4	Class	Society is furthermore split into classes: political, social, or tribal groups. A class which acquires political power, also inherits the society in which that power is gained. A former working class eventually becomes the new ruling class. The problem of a plurality or minority ruling the entire society persists.
I	5	Plebiscites	Plebiscites or referendums are not an appropriate solution to the political problem. One's political opinion does not reduce to a yes-or-no vote.
I	6	Popular Conferences and People's Committees	The solution to the problem of democracy is to establish a series of Popular Conferences (or, Congresses) and People's Committees, which collectively consist of the entire society, and all of its sectors. Working together, these groups supplant government administration, with the participation of all. These groups are also not parliaments in which authority is delegated.
I	7	The Law of Society	The basis of law is in custom and religion, the authentic source of social regulation, and not in written constitutions. The very fact that constitutions are regularly amended is a proof of their weakness and transience as an instrument of government.
I	8	Who Supervises the Conduct of Society?	Just as political power should not be delegated to representatives, policing power also should not be delegated away from the entire society. Again, the structure of Conferences and Committees is the solution. The Whole is the legislature for the Whole, and the Whole is the law enforcement for the Whole.
I	9	How can Society Redirect its Course when Deviations from its Laws occur?	In the case where a minority runs a government, another minority with initiative may seize power through revolution, with the end result being the same: minority rule. The solution to this cycle is again the system of Conferences and Committees: the entire society organically governing itself. When this occurs, there is only a Whole, and thus no exterior enemy to fight.
I	10	The Press	While individuals and companies have the right to express themselves in a private capacity, "the press" as a means of expression for society must be issued by the Conferences and Committees. Otherwise, individuals would again usurp power away from others in the realm of ideas.
II	11	The Economic Basis of the Third Universal Theory	Recent developments in working life such as unions and minimum wage do not go far enough in achieving equality for all workers. What is needed is the abolition of wage-earning in favor of a "partnering" process of an individual worker with a given industry. Yields must be shared equally not only among individuals, but among all components of a production process.
II	12	Need	Need is a central economic problem. The needs of some may be preyed upon by those who have the means to provide, and thus exploit. Government should eliminate such exploitation.
II	13	Housing	The rental of housing, for example, is exploitation, and infringes the freedom of the renter. Ideally, everyone should have only one house, because if a given party has more than one property, they will be inclined to rent it, thereby exploiting their renters.
II	14	Income	Individual income is essential to an economy. Again, such income should not be realized as wages paid by an owner, but as the result of partnership in an industry.
II	15	Means of Transportation	Transportation should also be available to all, and at the same time not owned by some only to be rented to others, as in the case of taxi services.
II	16	Land	Land, like all of the aforementioned categories, should be equally available to all. In general, the economy is a zero-sum game, and components of the economy should therefore be distributed equally among all, to produce equality of outcome. No one has the right to save for themselves beyond their own needs, except up to their own arithmetic share of a given good among the whole population.
II	17	Domestic Servants	Like goods-producing wage earners, service-rendering domestic servants are effectively slaves. The economic model already sketched can also be applied to their situation.
III	18	The Social Basis of the Third Universal Theory	Individuals, families, tribes and nations are social units, and their social ties drive the process of history. Of these, the nation is a central unit, held together by nationalism. Just as the sun would dissipate without gravity, nations dissipate without national unity.
III	19	The Family	Families, individuals and nations (in the sense of ethnic nation states) are natural, objective human social categories, on a continuum. Opposed to these is the artificial modern construct of the state, distinct from a nation.
III	20	The Tribe	Past the family, the next largest human group level is the tribe. The various human social units are decreasingly important to individuals on a personal level, as their size increases.
III	21	The Merits of the Tribe	Tribes are rooted in blood, provide social cohesion, able to internally monitor themselves due to their numbers. They also ensure the socialization of their individuals, an education more useful than a school education.
III	22	The Nation	Again, nationalism is a central social category, one closely related to but distinct from other large-scale social categories: religions, states, and empires. The reason why states and empires change and fall is because of their incongruence with authentic nations.
III	23	Woman	Women and men are equal as human beings, in the sense that they have the same physiological needs, and are thinking and feeling beings. However, sexual dimorphism gives rise to gender roles which are natural and appropriate to the differences between the sexes. Freedom consists in following nature, specifically in women having the ability to raise families without being forced by society to seek work which is suitable only for men.
III	24	Minorities	Minorities are of two types: those already having a nation, and those having none, making their own. Either way, their rights must be protected.
III	25	Black People will Prevail in the World	Black people are poised to dominate the human population because their culture includes polygamy and shuns birth control, and because they live in a climate which is "continuously hot", with the result that work is less important for them than in other cultures.
III	26	Education	Formal school education is dictatorial, another tyranny like those listed above. Education should be made available in whatever fashion people wish to engage with it.
III	27	Music and Art	Humans should eventually speak one language. Artistic and cultural tastes are influenced by differences in language, and the former imprint themselves "on the genes" of the individual.
III	28	Sport, Horsemanship and the Stage	Spectatorship in sports, theater and other entertainments is foolish. People should engage in sports directly, deriving the benefits of athletics for themselves, rather than standing by and watching others perform.

== Reception ==
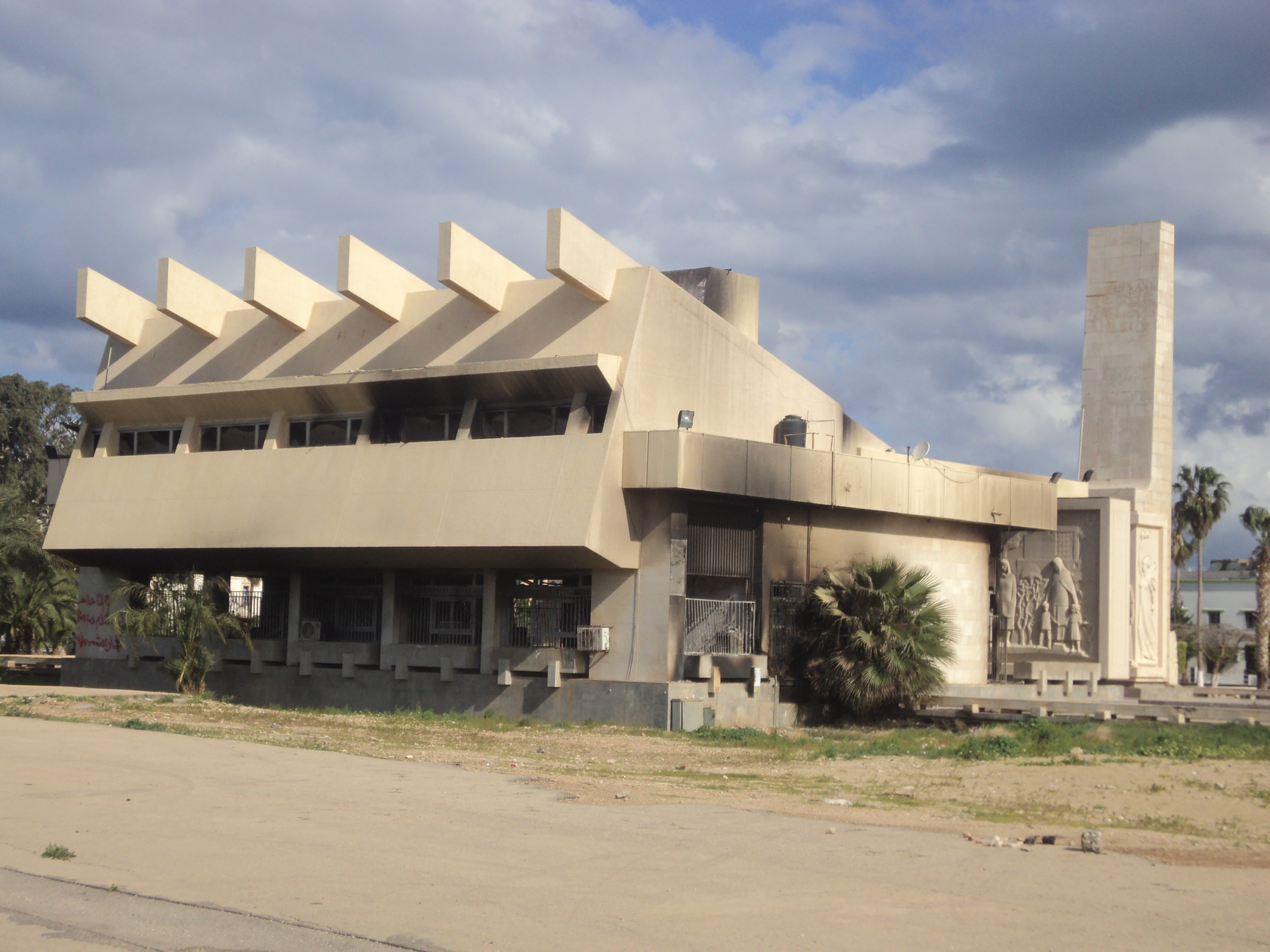
Burned-out The Green Book centre in Benghazi's downtown during the 2011 Libyan Civil War

George Tremlett has called the resulting media dull and lacking in a clash of ideas. Dartmouth College Professor Dirk Vandewalle describes the book as more a collection of aphorisms than a systematic argument. U.S. Ambassador David Mack called the book quite jumbled, with various ideas including "a fair amount of xenophobia" wrapped up in "strange mixture".

Writing for the British Broadcasting Corporation, the journalist Martin Asser described the book as follows: "The theory claims to solve the contradictions inherent in capitalism and communism... In fact, it is little more than a series of fatuous diatribes, and it is bitterly ironic that a text whose professed objective is to break the shackles... has been used instead to subjugate an entire population."

The book caused a scandal in 1987, when West German ice hockey club ECD Iserlohn, led by Heinz Weifenbach, signed a US$900,000 advertising deal for the book.

On a 2008 visit to Libya, it was reported by Libyan state media that Bolivian President Evo Morales remarked "I read the Green Book, studied it and I am enthusiastic about the thinking spelled out in the Green Book".

== See also ==
- Arab socialism
- Islamic socialism
- Jamahiriya
- Quotations from Chairman Mao Tse-tung
- Ruhnama
- Secular religion
