= Markus Keller (ice hockey) =

German ice hockey player (born 1989)

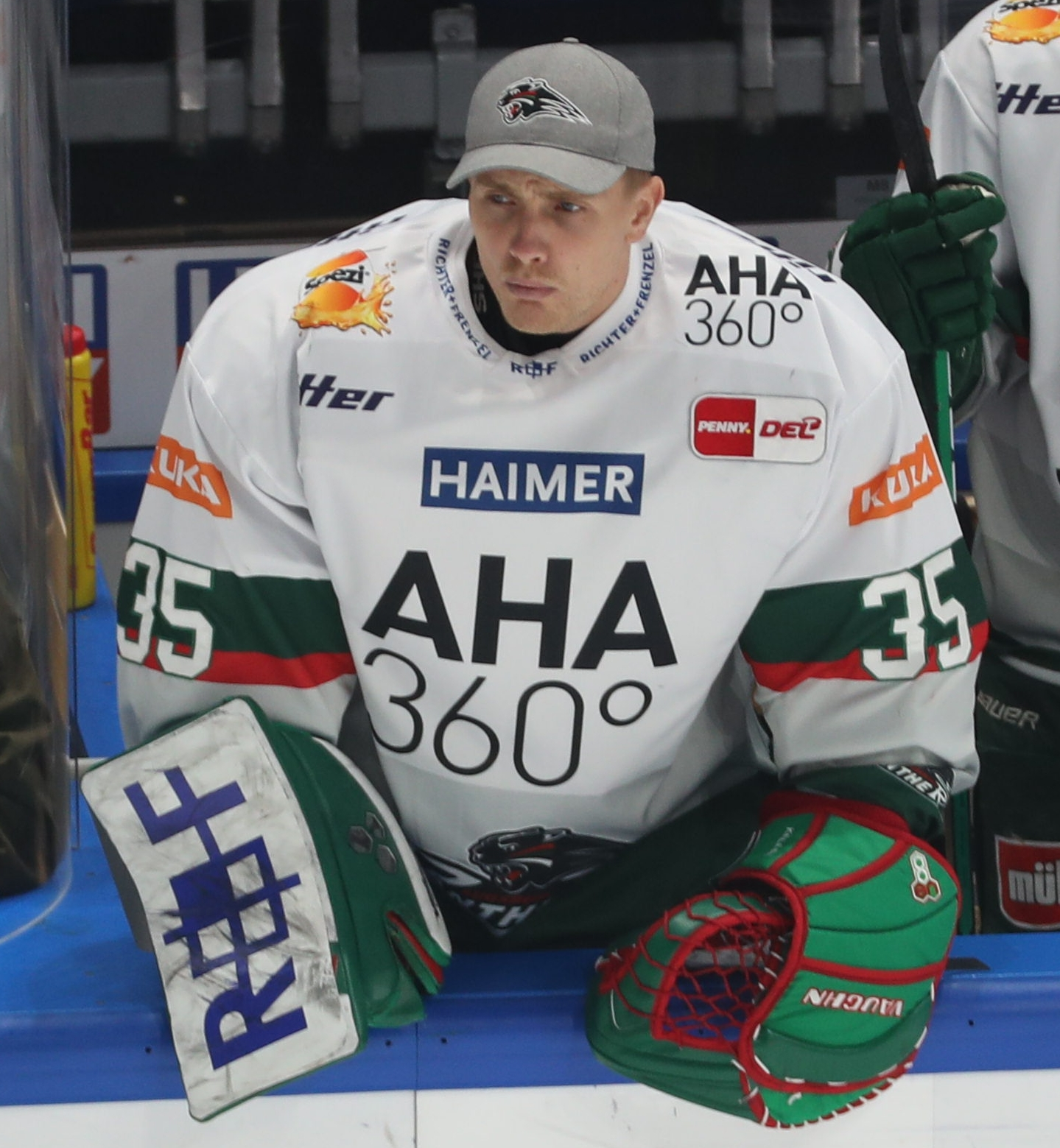
- Born: 19 August 1989 (age 36) Augsburg, West Germany
- Height: 6 ft 2 in (188 cm)
- Weight: 198 lb (90 kg; 14 st 2 lb)
- Position: Goaltender
- Caught: Left
- Played for: Eisbären Berlin; Augsburger Panther
- Playing career: 2007–2025

Markus Keller (born 19 August 1989) is a German former professional ice hockey goaltender. He most notably played for Eisbären Berlin and Augsburger Panther in the Deutsche Eishockey Liga (DEL). He is currently the team manager for Augsburger Panther.

== Playing career ==
After parts of five seasons in the DEL with Berlin and Augsburg, Keller signed a one-year contract to join EC Kassel Huskies of the DEL2 on 2 April 2015.

On 13 April 2018, Keller returned to the DEL with Augsburg after a three-season stint with the Huskies, signing a one-year deal.

Following the 2024–25 season, Keller announced his retirement in ending his 18-year professional career. Remaining with Augsburger Panther he was immediately introduced as the General Manager of the club on 25 March 2025.
