= German Ice Hockey Federation =

Germany
- Association name: German Ice Hockey Federation
- IIHF Code: GER
- Founded: 16 June 1963
- IIHF membership: 19 September 1909
- Association history: Germany; 1909–1920; 1926–1946; 1951–1956; West Germany; 1956–1990; Germany; 1990–present
- President: Franz Reindl

The German Ice Hockey Federation (German: Deutscher Eishockey-Bund), commonly abbreviated as DEB, is the governing federation of German ice hockey associations. It was established on 16 June 1963 in Krefeld. Until 1990 it served only the old Federal Republic of Germany and West Berlin. Until the establishment of the DEB, ice hockey was one of many different ice and winter sports overseen by the Deutschen Eissport-Verband.

The German Ice Hockey Federation took over the responsibility for the supra-regional leagues (especially the Bundesliga) and for the national team. It became the additional West German representative in the International Ice Hockey Federation.

== Presidents ==
- 1963/64 Ludwig Zametzer (Füssen)/ Dr. Günther Sabetzki (Düsseldorf) were co-Presidents
- 1964–1992 Otto Wanner (Füssen)
- 1992–1995 Ulf Jäkel (Kaufbeuren)
- 1995–2002 Rainer Gossmann (Düsseldorf)
- 2002–2008 Hans-Ulrich Esken (Schwerte)
- 2008–2010 interim: Uwe Harnos (Kaufbeuren)
- 2010–2014 Uwe Harnos (Kaufbeuren)
- 2014– Franz Reindl (Garmisch-Partenkirchen)

== Vice presidents ==
- 1963/64 position vacant
- 1964–1984 Dr. Günther Sabetzki (Düsseldorf)
- 1984–1988 Dr. Ernst Eichler (Mannheim)
- 1988–1991 Rudolf Gandorfer (Landshut)
- 1991–1993 Heinz Landen (Köln)
- 1993–1995 Dr. Wolfgang Bonenkamp (Düsseld.)
- 1995–2002 Rudolf Schnabel (Nürnberg)
- 2002–2008 Uwe Harnos (Kaufbeuren)
- 2002–2010 Bodo Lauterjung (Ingolstadt)
- 2002–2002 Jochen Haselbacher (Hannover)
- 2004–2008 Wolfgang Brück (Iserlohn)
- 2008–2014 Erich Kühnhackl (Landshut)
- 2010–2014 Manuel Hüttl (Thaining)
- 2010–2014 Ramund Schneeweis (Hamm)
- 2014– Daniel Hopp (Heidelberg)
- 2014– Berthold Wipfler (Walldorf)
- 2014– Marc Hindelang (Lindau)

== Directors ==
- 1970–86 Roman Neumayer (Olching)
- 1986–92 Helmut Bauer (Garmisch-P.)
- 1992–2011 Franz Reindl (Garmisch-P.)
- 2012–2013 Pat Cortina
- 2013–2017 Ernst Höfner
- 2017– Stefan Schaidnagel

== Team officials ==
- General Manager
  - Toni Söderholm
- Trainer
  - Toni Söderholm (Trainer)
  - Tobias Abstreiter (Co-Trainer)
  - Christian Künast (Co-Trainer)
  - Geoff Ward (Co-Trainer)
  - Patrick Dallaire (Goalie-Trainer)
