= Xaver Unsinn =

German ice hockey player and coach

- Born: 29 November 1929 Füssen, Germany
- Died: 4 January 2012 (aged 82) Füssen, Germany
- Position: Forward
- Shot: Right
- Played for: EV Füssen (Bundesliga); ESV Kaufbeuren (Bundesliga)
- National team: West Germany
- Playing career: 1950–1962

Xaver Unsinn (29 November 1929 – 4 January 2012) was a German ice hockey player and coach. His greatest success was winning the bronze medal at the 1976 Winter Olympics as coach of the German national team. He also competed at the 1952 and 1960 Winter Olympics.

Unsinn was coach of the German national team on three occasions, 1964, 1975 to 1977 and, again, from 1981 to 1990, coaching the team in 221 internationals.

As a player, he spent most of his career with the EV Füssen, which he won eight national German championships with. As a club coach he also won three German and one Swiss national championships with the Düsseldorfer EG, Berliner SC and SC Bern.

He was awarded the Order of Merit of the Federal Republic of Germany, and was inducted into the IIHF Hall of Fame in 1998.

He died on 4 January 2012.
