= Roy Roedger =

- Born: October 11, 1958 (age 67) Weston, Ontario, Canada
- Height: 6 ft 4 in (193 cm)
- Weight: 203 lb (92 kg; 14 st 7 lb)
- Position: Right wing
- Played for: Prince Albert Raiders (SJHL); Mannheimer ERC (Bundesliga); Düsseldorfer EG (Bundesliga)
- National team: West Germany
- Playing career: 1979–1990

Roy Roedger (born October 11, 1958) is a retired German ice hockey player born and raised in Canada. Roedger, of German descent, left Canada for Germany in 1978 and played eleven seasons there. He also fielded for the German national team at two Olympic games and six World Championships. After the end of his career he returned to Canada.

He is a member of the German Ice Hockey Hall of Fame.

== Biography ==
Roedger, born in Weston, Ontario of German descent, started his playing career with the Prince Albert Raiders in the Saskatchewan Junior Hockey League.

Roedger was discovered in 1978 by Heinz Weisenbach, coach of the Mannheimer ERC in the German Ice hockey Bundesliga. Weisenbach went to Canada to discover whether he could find Canadian ice hockey players of German descent who were eligible to obtain a German passport and therefore would not take up one of the limited permissible spots for foreigners. Additionally, they would also be eligible for the German national team. Weisenbach flew to Toronto and contacted German clubs in Canada to make contacts. He watched a number of junior games and eventually discovered a number of young players, among them Roedger, his brother Peter, Harold Kreis, Manfred Wolf, Ralph Krueger, George Fritz, Mike Schmidt, and Karl Friesen. Weisenbach managed to convince some of them to join his club, Mannheimer ERC while others, like Friesen, later appeared in the Bundesliga and for Germany for other clubs. It marked the beginning of an influx of ethnic German Canadians, the Deutschkanadier, in German ice hockey and on the national team.

Roedger joined Mannheim, freshly promoted to the Bundesliga, and by 1980, the club won the national championship, giving credit to Weisenbach's initially belittled recruitment effort.

Roedgers played for six seasons at Mannheim and, from 1982, also for the German national team. While at Mannheim he played in three World Championships and the 1984 Winter Olympics for Germany. In 1985, in a friendly against Switzerland, he was part of the Canadian bloc of the German team when, for the first time, all skaters on the ice were born in Canada, a novelty in German ice hockey. The players were Roedger, Krueger and Wolf as forwards while Kreis and Schmidt played defense, all discovered for Germany by Weisenbach.

In the 1984–85 season, Roedger was involved in an incident in which he hit Kölner EC player Steve McNeil in the right eye with his stick. In the scene, which was repeated on German television many times, McNeil is shown to lose a lot of blood. McNeil lost up to 50 percent of his vision in the right eye and Roedger was forced to pay him compensation after an out-of-court settlement but intent was never proven and it was generally considered to be an accidental foul.

At the end of the 1984–85 season, Roedger left Mannheim for the Düsseldorfer EG. With Düsseldorf, he won one more German championship in his last season, 1989–90, and also took part in three more World Championships and the 1988 Winter Olympics. In 1990, aged 31, he retired from Bundesliga ice hockey.

=== After his playing career ===
Roedger returned to Canada after his career ended. He acquired a degree in sports and event marketing and formed SDI Marketing, a sports marketing agency of which he is the CEO.

Roedger's younger brother Peter (born 1960) also played in Germany, starting his career with Berliner SC in 1981, playing for a season with his brother in Mannheim in 1982–83 before dropping down to the 2nd Ice hockey Bundesliga. He played, until 1992, for Eintracht Frankfurt, Duisburger SC and EC Kassel.

== Honours ==
- Ice hockey Bundesliga
  - Champions: (2) 1979–80, 1989–90
  - Runners-up: (4) 1981–82, 1982–83, 1984–85, 1988–89
- Ice Hockey World Championships
  - Participant: (6) 1982, 1983, 1985, 1986, 1987, 1989
- Olympic ice hockey tournament
  - Participant: (2) 1984, 1988
