= Erich Kühnhackl =

German ice hockey player

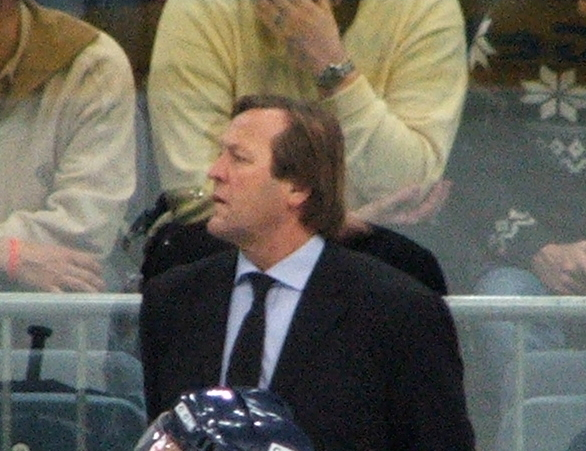
- Born: 17 October 1950 (age 76) Citice, Czechoslovakia
- Height: 6 ft 5 in (196 cm)
- Weight: 213 lb (97 kg; 15 st 3 lb)
- Position: Centre
- Shot: Left
- Played for: 1.GBun; EV Landshut; Kölner Haie; NDA; EHC Olten
- National team: West Germany
- Playing career: 1968–1989
Medal record
Men's ice hockey
Representing West Germany
Olympic Games
Bronze medal – third place	1976 Innsbruck	Team

Erich Kühnhackl (born 17 October 1950) is a German former professional ice hockey player, born and raised in Czechoslovakia. He is one of the all-time greats of German ice hockey and was named Germany's ice hockey player of the 20th century in 2000. Kühnhackl is a member of the IIHF Hall of Fame as well as of the German ice hockey Hall of Fame and Germany's Sport Hall of Fame.

== Career ==
He won four German Championships and a bronze medal at the 1976 Winter Olympics in Innsbruck and is widely regarded as the best German hockey player ever and was inducted into the International Ice Hockey Federation Hall of Fame in 1997. Kühnhackl was also named the German ice hockey player of the Century in 2000. His nickname "Kleiderschrank auf Kufen" (wardrobe on skates) refers to his mighty appearance. In Finland he is known as Iso-Eerikki (Big Eric) for the same reason.

After his playing career Kühnhackl worked as coach of EV Landshut, German National Team, EC Bad Nauheim, Erding Jets, Polar Bears Regensburg and the Straubing Tigers. He served as sport director for the Frankfurt Lions of the Deutsche Eishockey Liga from June 2009 to June 2010 and was vice president of the Deutscher Eishockey-Bund, the German ice hockey federation, between 2010 and 2014.

== Achievements ==
- won German Championships: 1970 with EV Landshut, 1977 and 1979 with Kölner Haie, 1983 with EV Landshut
- German Player of the Year (1978, 1980, 1983)
- 211 international games played (131 G) including 3 Olympic Games and 10 World Championships
- won a bronze medal at the 1976 Winter Olympics in Innsbruck and was afterwards presented with the Silbernes Lorbeerblatt
- first German Top Scorer at the World Championships 1978 (15 points)
- 774 German league games (724 G, 707 A, 1431 PTS, 1110 PIM)
- All-Star Team of the German Bundesliga 1976/77, 1977/78, 1978/79, 1979/80, 1981/82, 1982/83 and 1983/84
- Gustav-Jaenecke Cup (Best Scorer) 1973/74, 1976/77, 1977/78, 1978/79, 1979/80, 1982/83 and 1983/84
- Fritz-Poitsch-Trophy (Best Goalscorer) 1973/74 and 1979/80
- Xaver-Unsinn-Trophy (Most Assists) 1973/74, 1977/78, 1982/83 and 1983/84
- German ice hockey player of the Century 2000

== Personal info ==
He and his parents, who were of German descent, emigrated from Czechoslovakia after the Soviet occupation in 1968.

In 2010, his son Tom was drafted in the 4th round of the NHL entry draft by the Pittsburgh Penguins.

== Career statistics ==
=== Regular season and playoffs ===
			Regular season					Playoffs
Season	Team	League	GP	G	A	Pts	PIM	GP	G	A	Pts	PIM
1968–69	EV Landshut	1.GBun	14	6	2	8	2	—	—	—	—	—
1969–70	EV Landshut	1.GBun	35	21	14	35	14	—	—	—	—	—
1970–71	EV Landshut	1.GBun	35	16	12	28	18	—	—	—	—	—
1971–72	EV Landshut	1.GBun	35	24	19	43	36	—	—	—	—	—
1972–73	EV Landshut	1.GBun	40	38	30	68	43	—	—	—	—	—
1973–74	EV Landshut	1.GBun	36	50	26	76	40	—	—	—	—	—
1974–75	EV Landshut	1.GBun	35	47	20	67	90	—	—	—	—	—
1975–76	EV Landshut	1.GBun	35	29	27	56	73	—	—	—	—	—
1976–77	Kölner EC	1.GBun	40	47	26	73	79	—	—	—	—	—
1977–78	Kölner EC	1.GBun	46	52	43	95	43	—	—	—	—	—
1978–79	Kölner EC	1.GBun	52	59	58	117	99	—	—	—	—	—
1979–80	EV Landshut	1.GBun	48	83	72	155	67	—	—	—	—	—
1980–81	EV Landshut	1.GBun	44	40	46	86	74	5	4	2	6	4
1981–82	EV Landshut	1.GBun	38	41	61	102	34	8	6	9	15	4
1982–83	EV Landshut	1.GBun	36	32	48	80	70	10	7	7	14	—
1983–84	EV Landshut	1.GBun	43	35	52	87	75	10	4	11	15	—
1984–85	EV Landshut	1.GBun	36	30	39	69	59	4	2	3	5	16
1985–86	EHC Olten	NDA	35	22	23	45	88	—	—	—	—	—
1986–87	EHC Olten	NDA	15	6	8	14	38	—	—	—	—	—
1987–88	EV Landshut	1.GBun	35	20	29	49	47	—	—	—	—	—
1988–89	EV Landshut	1.GBun	36	21	38	59	67	—	—	—	—	—
1.GBun totals			751	691	662	1353	1030	37	23	32	55	—
NDA totals			50	28	31	59	126	—	—	—	—	—

=== International ===
Year	Team	Event	GP	G	A	Pts	PIM
1976	West Germany	OLY	5	5	5	10	10
1976	West Germany	WC	10	7	1	8	18
1977	West Germany	WC	10	5	5	10	24
1978	West Germany	WC	10	8	7	15	6
1981	West Germany	WC	8	3	3	6	12
1982	West Germany	WC	7	3	5	8	8
1983	West Germany	WC	10	5	7	12	28
1984	West Germany	OLY	6	8	6	14	12
1985	West Germany	WC	10	3	4	7	20
Senior totals			76	47	43	90	138
