= Murray Heatley =

Canadian former ice hockey player (born 1948)

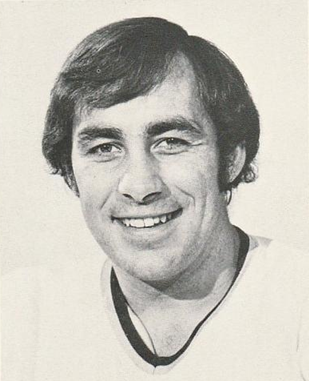
- Born: November 7, 1948 (age 77) Calgary, Alberta, Canada
- Height: 5 ft 8 in (173 cm)
- Weight: 180 lb (82 kg; 12 st 12 lb)
- Position: Right wing
- Shot: Right
- Played for: Minnesota Fighting Saints; Indianapolis Racers
- Playing career: 1971–1986

Murray Heatley (born November 7, 1948) is a Canadian former ice hockey player.

Heatley played professional hockey for the Minnesota Fighting Saints and the Indianapolis Racers in the World Hockey Association. He also played seven seasons in Germany, playing for SC Riessersee and ERC Freiburg.

== Career statistics ==
| | | | Regular season | | | | | Playoffs |
| Season | Team | League | GP | G | A | Pts | PIM | GP | G | A | Pts | PIM |
|---|---|---|---|---|---|---|---|---|---|---|---|---|
| 1970–71 | Wisconsin Badgers | WCHA |
| 1970–71 | Tulsa Oilers | CHL | 6 | 4 | 4 | 8 | 14 | — | — | — | — | — |
| 1971–72 | Tulsa Oilers | CHL | 70 | 20 | 30 | 50 | 68 | 13 | 5 | 4 | 9 | 6 |
| 1972–73 | Phoenix Roadrunners | WHL | 72 | 43 | 55 | 98 | 62 | 10 | 4 | 8 | 12 | 16 |
| 1973–74 | Minnesota Fighting Saints | WHA | 71 | 26 | 32 | 58 | 23 | 10 | 1 | 0 | 1 | 2 |
| 1974–75 | Minnesota Fighting Saints | WHA | 22 | 5 | 9 | 14 | 31 | — | — | — | — | — |
| 1974–75 | Indianapolis Racers | WHA | 29 | 15 | 8 | 23 | 25 | — | — | — | — | — |
| 1975–76 | Mohawk Valley Comets | NAHL | 33 | 23 | 17 | 40 | 23 | 4 | 1 | 2 | 3 | 11 |
| 1975–76 | Indianapolis Racers | WHA | 34 | 2 | 5 | 7 | 7 | — | — | — | — | — |
| 1979–80 | SC Riessersee | 1.GBun | 46 | 51 | 23 | 74 | 128 |
| 1980–81 | ERC Freiburg | 2.GBun | 43 | 68 | 65 | 133 | 79 |
| 1981–82 | ERC Freiburg | 1.GBun | 44 | 36 | 32 | 68 | 64 | — | — | — | — | — |
| 1982–83 | ERC Freiburg | 2.GBun | 46 | 53 | 45 | 98 | 57 |
| 1983–84 | ERC Freiburg | 1.GBun | 46 | 20 | 22 | 42 | 38 |
| WHA totals | | | 156 | 48 | 54 | 102 | 86 | 10 | 1 | 0 | 1 | 2 |

== Personal life ==
Heatley is the father of Dany Heatley who played 13 seasons in the National Hockey League for five different teams and was a three-time NHL All-Star. Another son, Mark Heatley, is also a professional ice hockey player who played extensively in Germany.

== Awards and honors ==
| Award | Year |
|---|---|
| All-WCHA Second team | 1969–70 |
| All-WCHA Second team | 1970–71 |
