= Uli Hiemer =

German ice hockey player

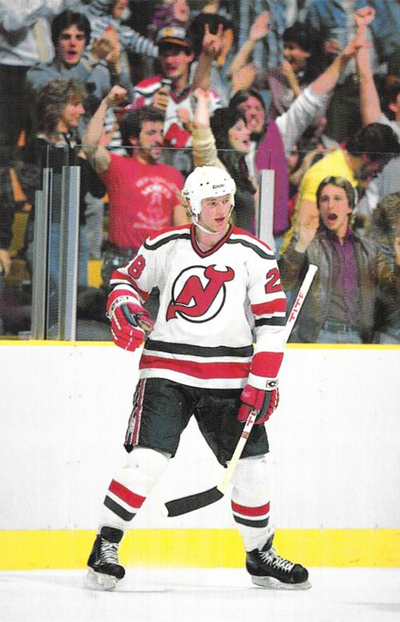
- Born: 21 September 1962 (age 63) Füssen, West Germany
- Height: 6 ft 0 in (183 cm)
- Weight: 189 lb (86 kg; 13 st 7 lb)
- Position: Defence
- Shot: Left
- Played for: EV Füssen; Kölner Haie; New Jersey Devils; Düsseldorfer EG
- National team: West Germany and Germany
- NHL draft: 48th overall, 1981; Colorado Rockies
- Playing career: 1979–1996

Ulrich Hiemer (born 21 September 1962) is a German former professional ice hockey player who was among the first Germans to play in the NHL.

== Career ==
Hiemer appeared at three Olympics and at the 1984 Canada Cup. He spent three seasons with the New Jersey Devils in the mid 1980s making his NHL debut on 12 October 1984, recording 73 points in 143 total games. He retired in 1996 after playing in the Deutsche Eishockey Liga for the Düsseldorfer EG.

== Career statistics ==
=== Regular season and playoffs ===
			Regular season					Playoffs
Season	Team	League	GP	G	A	Pts	PIM	GP	G	A	Pts	PIM
1979–80	EV Füssen	GER	44	6	10	16	84	—	—	—	—	—
1980–81	EV Füssen	GER	31	8	9	17	78	4	3	2	5	6
1981–82	Kölner EC	GER	43	10	23	33	85	8	3	0	3	27
1982–83	Kölner EC	GER	46	8	17	25	69	9	2	6	8	23
1983–84	Kölner EC	GER	42	20	16	36	78	8	3	7	10	14
1984–85	New Jersey Devils	NHL	53	5	24	29	70	—	—	—	—	—
1985–86	New Jersey Devils	NHL	50	8	16	24	61	—	—	—	—	—
1985–86	Maine Mariners	AHL	15	2	5	7	19	—	—	—	—	—
1986–87	New Jersey Devils	NHL	40	6	14	20	45	—	—	—	—	—
1987–88	Düsseldorfer EG	GER	34	9	19	28	80	10	3	6	9	22
1988–89	Düsseldorfer EG	GER	32	17	25	42	7	10	6	3	9	46
1989–90	Düsseldorfer EG	GER	35	13	28	41	67	11	1	8	9	16
1990–91	Düsseldorfer EG	GER	44	18	32	50	42	13	3	11	14	22
1991–92	Düsseldorfer EG	GER	42	8	27	35	67	8	4	6	10	12
1992–93	Düsseldorfer EG	GER	44	11	28	39	57	11	1	3	4	20
1993–94	Düsseldorfer EG	GER	44	17	21	38	62	—	—	—	—	—
1994–95	Düsseldorfer EG	DEL	39	8	17	25	52	10	1	9	10	20
1995–96	Düsseldorfer EG	DEL	47	9	22	31	98	13	3	5	8	24
GER/DEL totals			567	162	294	400	982	115	33	66	99	252
NHL totals			143	19	54	73	176	—	—	—	—	—

=== International ===
Year	Team	Event	GP	G	A	Pts	PIM
1979	West Germany	EJC	5	2	0	2	8
1980	West Germany	EJC	5	3	1	4	20
1980	West Germany	WJC	5	1	4	5	12
1981	West Germany	WJC	5	3	4	7	16
1981	West Germany	WC	6	0	1	1	12
1982	West Germany	WJC	7	1	2	3	21
1982	West Germany	WC	2	0	0	0	2
1983	West Germany	WC	9	1	3	4	8
1984	West Germany	OLY	6	2	0	2	4
1984	West Germany	CC	2	0	0	0	4
1985	West Germany	WC	10	2	1	3	10
1989	West Germany	WC	10	2	1	3	8
1990	West Germany	WC	10	0	1	1	6
1992	Germany	OLY	8	0	1	1	12
1992	Germany	WC	6	3	1	4	26
1993	Germany	WC	5	0	1	1	22
1994	Germany	OLY	6	0	0	0	0
1995	Germany	WC	5	0	1	1	2
Junior totals			27	10	11	21	77
Senior totals			85	10	11	21	116
