= Karl Friesen =

Canadian-born German ice hockey player

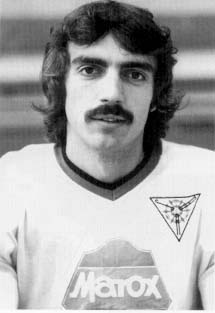
- Born: June 30, 1958 (age 68) Winnipeg, Manitoba, Canada
- Height: 6 ft 0 in (183 cm)
- Weight: 185 lb (84 kg; 13 st 3 lb)
- Position: Goaltender
- Caught: Left
- Played for: New Jersey Devils; SB Rosenheim; EC Hedos München; Maddogs München
- National team: West Germany and Germany
- NHL draft: Undrafted
- Playing career: 1975–1996

Karl Heinz Friesen (born June 30, 1958) is a Canadian-born German former professional ice hockey goaltender. Friesen spent most of his career in Germany, playing in the Eishockey-Bundesliga and Deutsche Eishockey Liga, but he also played four games in the National Hockey League with the New Jersey Devils during the 1986–87 season. Internationally Friesen represented both West Germany and Germany at multiple tournaments, including the 1984, 1988, and 1992 Winter Olympics, and six World Championships.

== Career ==
A Canadian of German descent, Friesen played for the West Kildonan North Stars of the Manitoba Junior Hockey League and the St. Boniface Mohawks of the Central Amateur Senior Hockey League, before taking his game to Germany in 1980 and would spend 15 years in Germany's top-flight. In 1985-86, Friesen played for the Maine Mariners of the American Hockey League and had a short stint with the New Jersey Devils of the NHL in 1986-87, but then returned to Rosenheim. He played a total of 12 years with the SB Rosenheim team, two with Hedos Munich and one with the Mad Dogs Munich. Friesen won German championships with Rosenheim in 1982, 1985 and 1989.

A dual citizen of Canada and the Federal Republic of Germany, Friesen represented West Germany internationally on many occasions, including six World Championships, the 1984 and 1988 Winter Olympics and the 1984 Canada Cup. After German Unification, he represented Germany at the 1992 Winter Olympics. He won a total of 105 caps for the German national team.

After retiring in 1996, he returned to his native Canada.

Friesen is a member of the German Ice Hockey Hall of Fame and of the Manitoba Hockey Hall of Fame. In 2000, he was named German goalie of the century.

== Career statistics ==
=== Regular season and playoffs ===
			Regular season									Playoffs
Season	Team	League	GP	W	L	T	MIN	GA	SO	GAA	SV%	GP	W	L	MIN	GA	SO	GAA	SV%
1975–76	West Kildonan North Stars	MJHL	11	8	2	0	658	44	0	4.01	.889	—	—	—	—	—	—	—	—
1976–77	Kildonan North Stars	MJHL	34	23	9	0	1925	125	0	3.90	.902	—	—	—	—	—	—	—	—
1977–78	Kildonan North Stars	MJHL	38	19	17	0	2091	164	0	4.71	.873	18	12	6	1042	71	1	4.08	—
1978–79	Kildonan North Stars	MJHL	37	—	—	—	2194	144	1	3.94	—	—	—	—	—	—	—	—	—
1979–80	St. Boniface Mohawks	CASHL	—	—	—	—	—	—	—	—	—	—	—	—	—	—	—	—	—
1980–81	SB Rosenheim	GER	44	—	—	—	2592	140	0	3.24	—	3	—	—	180	8	0	2.67	—
1981–82	SB Rosenheim	GER	42	—	—	—	2469	147	0	3.57	—	7	—	—	420	15	0	2.14	—
1982–83	SB Rosenheim	GER	36	—	—	—	2160	103	0	2.86	—	9	—	—	480	36	0	4.50	—
1983–84	SB Rosenheim	GER	42	—	—	—	2490	136	0	3.28	—	4	—	—	240	10	0	2.50	—
1984–85	SB Rosenheim	GER	35	23	5	6	2100	99	2	2.83	—	9	9	0	547	22	0	2.41	—
1985–86	Maine Mariners	AHL	35	16	11	5	1983	115	2	3.48	.886	5	1	4	340	14	0	2.47	—
1986–87	New Jersey Devils	NHL	4	0	2	1	130	16	0	7.38	.800	—	—	—	—	—	—	—	—
1986–87	SB Rosenheim	GER	14	10	2	2	840	39	1	2.79	—	7	3	4	424	18	0	2.55	—
1987–88	SB Rosenheim	GER	33	22	7	4	1980	85	3	2.58	—	14	8	6	840	33	3	2.36	—
1988–89	SB Rosenheim	GER	36	19	8	9	2160	98	0	2.72	—	11	9	2	655	27	0	2.47	—
1989–90	SB Rosenheim	GER	18	14	4	4	1060	43	0	2.43	—	11	8	3	526	37	0	4.22	—
1990–91	SB Rosenheim	GER	40	—	—	—	2340	105	0	2.69	—	11	—	—	612	36	0	3.53	—
1991–92	SB Rosenheim	GER	44	—	—	—	2447	133	0	3.26	—	9	—	—	547	27	0	2.96	—
1992–93	EC Hedos München	GER	44	21	15	8	2640	111	0	2.52	—	4	—	—	240	14	0	3.50	—
1993–94	EC Hedos München	GER	44	—	—	—	2172	81	0	2.24	—	10	—	—	600	25	0	2.50	—
1994–95	Maddogs München	DEL	26	—	—	—	1409	71	0	3.02	—	—	—	—	—	—	—	—	—
1994–95	SB Rosenheim	DEL	28	—	—	—	1571	81	0	3.09	—	4	—	—	240	18	0	4.50	—
NHL totals			4	0	2	1	131	16	0	7.38	.800	—	—	—	—	—	—	—	—

=== International ===
Year	Team	Event	GP	W	L	T	MIN	GA	SO	GAA	SV%
1981	West Germany	WC	4	1	2	1	240	20	0	5.00	.878
1982	West Germany	WC	7	2	4	1	420	30	0	4.28	.880
1983	West Germany	WC	5	—	—	—	300	21	—	4.20	.891
1984	West Germany	OLY	5	3	1	1	300	16	0	3.20	.899
1984	West Germany	CC	4	0	3	1	240	21	0	5.25	.858
1985	West Germany	WC	9	3	5	1	580	34	1	3.51	.886
1987	West Germany	WC	5	2	2	1	300	19	0	3.80	.864
1988	West Germany	OLY	6	3	2	0	328	17	0	3.11	.906
1989	West Germany	WC	8	1	5	2	480	31	1	3.87	.872
1992	Germany	OLY	1	0	1	0	60	5	0	5.00	.833
Senior totals			54	15	25	8	3248	214	2	3.95	—
