= Bill Lochead =

Canadian ice hockey player (born 1954)

- Born: October 13, 1954 (age 72) Forest, Ontario, Canada
- Height: 6 ft 1 in (185 cm)
- Weight: 195 lb (88 kg; 13 st 13 lb)
- Position: Left wing
- Shot: Right
- Played for: Detroit Red Wings; Colorado Rockies; New York Rangers
- NHL draft: 9th overall, 1974; Detroit Red Wings
- WHA draft: 32nd overall, 1974; Indianapolis Racers
- Playing career: 1974–1987

William Alexander "Whip" Lochead (/lɑːˈhɛd/ lah-HED; born October 13, 1954, in Forest, Ontario) is a Canadian retired ice hockey forward and current hockey player agent. He started his junior hockey career in 1969–70 with the Sarnia Bees of OHA Western Jr. B league. In 1970-71 he established the current Western Jr. B goal scoring record of 72 goals in 42 games. Lochead was drafted 2nd overall to the OHA Oshawa Generals in 1971. He was then drafted 1st (9th overall) by the Detroit Red Wings in the 1974 NHL draft. He was also selected 3rd (32nd overall) by the Indianapolis Racers in the 1974 WHA draft. He was known as Billy Lochead during his playing days in the NHL and was nicknamed "Whip".

== Professional career ==
=== Minor league hockey ===
Lochead started his Jr. A career playing for the Oshawa Generals of the Ontario Hockey Association. He entered the league in 1971 but was slowed down by injuries at the beginning of the 1971–72 season. However, once healthy, Lochead started scoring, as he recorded 110 points with 56 goals in 1972–73 and 121 points with 57 goals in 1973–74 and was selected to the OHA second and first all-star teams in each of those seasons. The Detroit Red Wings drafted him with their first pick in 1974.

=== National hockey league ===
Lochead scored 16 goals as a rookie with the Wings in 1974–75 while playing on a line with Bill Hogaboam and Nick Libett. He continued to contribute as a role player for four and a half years which saw his point producing rise as Lochead gained confidence. He finally hit the 20-goal mark in the 1977–78 NHL season, helping the club to reach the playoffs for the first time in eight years. Playing on a line with Dale McCourt and Paul Woods, the Red Wings defeated the Atlanta Flames in the first round of the playoffs and Lochead scored two goals in the deciding 3–2 win at Olympia Stadium. His series-winning goals are still remembered by many Red Wing fans; the victory over Atlanta was the Wings' only playoff series win in the almost two decades between 1967 and 1986.

After missing the first two months of the 1978–79 NHL season due to a training camp knee injury, Lochead could not get his game back to the level of the previous season and he was claimed off waivers by the Colorado Rockies on February 9, 1979. He would play the final 26 games of the season with Colorado. In the off-season he was traded to the New York Rangers but ended up appearing in only seven games that season as he spent most of the year with the New Haven Nighthawks of the American Hockey League. In the lower-tiered league he scored 46 goals and was placed on the AHL's first all-star team. Lochead contributed strongly to the Nighthawks in playoff scoring that year, but the team fell in the semi-finals to the eventual champion Hershey Bears. Lochead also won the "Minor League Player of the Year Award" that season.

=== International play ===
Beginning in 1980–81, Lochead decided to try his luck overseas. He joined the highest ice hockey league in Germany, the Bundesliga. He joined Kolner EC and only played in 17 games before transferring to ESV Kaufbeuren. He finished out the season with 43 goals in 39 games and contributed 5 points in Kaufbeuren's short playoff run. During the off-season, Lochead was recognized as a player who knew the game and could excel if given the chance. He transferred to EC Bad Nauheim for the 1981–82 season and did not disappoint. Lochead put up 66 goals and 34 assists in only 42 games. He was far and away the best scorer on the team and the league, but still Bad Nauheim failed to make the playoffs. Lochead would finish as the league leader in both goals and penalty minutes and earn the league MVP award. Lochead would transfer in the off-season to Mannheimer ERC, one of the best teams in the league. He continued to score goals, but at a slower rate as Mannheim also featured scorers such as Manfred Wolf and Doug Berry and he was voted by the Mannheim fans as the team's MVP for 1982–83. Lochead stayed with the team until returning to Bad Nauheim EC for the 1984–85 season. Bad Nauheim was now in the lower-tiered 2nd Bundesliga and Lochead once again found his magical scoring touch. He played his last three years of hockey with the team and put up his best numbers to date in the 1985–86 season. In only 45 games, Lochead scored 71 goals and 49 assists for 120 points on the season. In the spring of 1986 he was chosen to play for the Dave King coached Team Canada in the Pravda Cup tournament in Leningrad (now St.Petersburg, Russia). After short stints with Chur of the Schweizerischer Eishockeyverband and the Vienna Capitals of the Austrian Hockey League, Lochead retired from the ice after the 1987–88 season.

=== Coaching career ===
Lochead decided to try his hand at coaching after retiring as a player. He filled in as a midseason replacement for ESC Wolfsburg in 1988 and remained with them the following season. He led the team to a 16–12–4 record in 1988–89. Lochead again crossed the Atlantic to coach for two teams in Switzerland within the Schweizerischer Eishockeyverband. After coaching Solothurn and Olten he returned to Germany to coach Sauerland Iserlohn ECD in the 1993–94 season. After one season with Sauerland he moved back into the top league of Germany, the DEL. He was head coach of the Ratinger Löwen from the 1994–95 season until 1996–97. In 1995-96 Lochead led the team to a surprising 10th-place finish in the 18 team league with the smallest budget in the league. Unfortunately, the team was plagued with financial problems which affected the team's performance and he was let go after Ratingen found themselves as the worst team in the league in 1996–97. Lochead coached Kassel Huskies of the DEL to a .520 win percentage record in 1997–98. He ended his coaching career as an assistant coach with the Frankfurt Lions of the DEL in 1998–1999. He is now a successful hockey player agent living in Frankfurt Germany.

== Awards and achievements ==
- OMJHL Second All-Star Team (1973)
- OMJHL First All-Star Team (1974)
- AHL First All-Star Team (1980), Minor League Player of the Year Award
- Named 1st Bundesliga Deutschland MVP (1982)
- Named 2nd Bundesliga Deutschland MVP, 1st All-Star Team (1986)

== Career statistics ==
			Regular season					Playoffs
Season	Team	League	GP	G	A	Pts	PIM	GP	G	A	Pts	PIM
1971–72	Oshawa Generals	OHA-Jr.	37	27	20	47	62	11	2	2	4	21
1972–73	Oshawa Generals	OHA-Jr.	59	56	54	110	89	—	—	—	—	—
1973–74	Oshawa Generals	OHA-Jr.	62	57	64	121	108	—	—	—	—	—
1974–75	Detroit Red Wings	NHL	65	16	12	28	34	—	—	—	—	—
1975–76	Detroit Red Wings	NHL	53	9	11	20	22	—	—	—	—	—
1975–76	New Haven Nighthawks	AHL	24	17	13	30	24	—	—	—	—	—
1976–77	Detroit Red Wings	NHL	61	16	14	30	39	—	—	—	—	—
1976–77	Kansas City Blues	CHL	10	8	8	16	0	—	—	—	—	—
1977–78	Detroit Red Wings	NHL	77	20	16	36	47	7	3	0	3	6
1978–79	Detroit Red Wings	NHL	40	4	7	11	20	—	—	—	—	—
1978–79	Colorado Rockies	NHL	27	4	2	6	14	—	—	—	—	—
1979–80	New York Rangers	NHL	7	0	0	0	4	3	4	1	5	13
1979–80	New Haven Nighthawks	AHL	68	46	43	89	90	10	6	5	11	8
1980–81	Kölner EC	1.GBun	17	16	8	24	61	—	—	—	—	—
1980–81	ESV Kaufbeuren	1.GBun	22	27	25	52	59	—	—	—	—	—
1981–82	VfL Bad Nauheim	1.GBun	42	66	34	100	195	—	—	—	—	—
1982–83	Mannheimer ERC	1.GBun	34	36	24	60	117	—	—	—	—	—
1983–84	Mannheimer ERC	1.GBun	47	36	27	63	77	—	—	—	—	—
1984–85	EHC Chur	NDA	5	1	3	4		—	—	—	—	—
1984–85	EC Bad Nauheim	FRG.2	16	28	20	48	61	—	—	—	—	—
1985–86	EC Bad Nauheim	FRG.2	45	71	49	120	78	10	37	16	53
1986–87	EC Bad Nauheim	FRG.2	27	23	26	49	35	—	—	—	—	—
1986–87	Wiener EV	AUT	19	12	8	20	24	—	—	—	—	—
NHL totals			330	69	62	131	180	10	7	1	8	19
1.GBun totals			162	181	118	299	509	—	—	—	—	—
FRG.2 totals			88	122	95	217	174	10	37	16	53	—

Preceded by Terry Richardson	Detroit Red Wings first-round draft pick 1974	Succeeded by Rick Lapointe
