= Peter Lee (ice hockey) =

English-Canadian ice hockey player

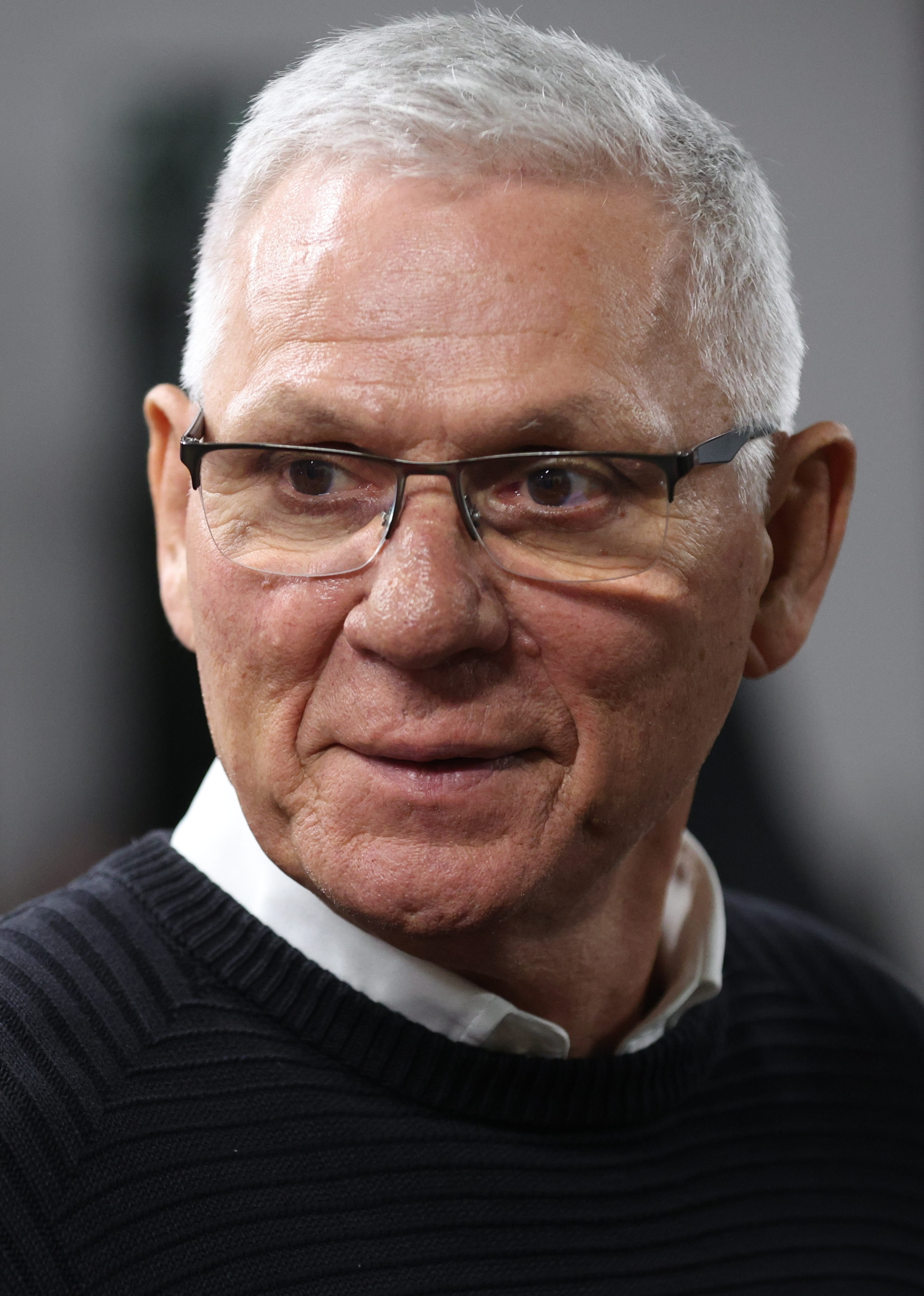
- Lee in 2024
- Born: 2 January 1956 (age 70) Ellesmere, England
- Height: 5 ft 9 in (175 cm)
- Weight: 180 lb (82 kg; 12 st 12 lb)
- Position: Right wing
- Shot: Right
- Played for: Pittsburgh Penguins; Düsseldorfer EG; Eisbären Berlin
- NHL draft: 12th overall, 1976; Montreal Canadiens
- WHA draft: 21st overall, 1976; Toronto Toros
- Playing career: 1976–1997

Peter John Lee (born 2 January 1956) is a Canadian ice hockey manager and former player. He played 431 National Hockey League (NHL) games with the Pittsburgh Penguins. Lee has been CEO of Eisbären Berlin of Germany's Deutsche Eishockey Liga since 2005.

== Early life ==
Lee was born in Ellesmere, England, and raised in Arvida, Quebec. As a youth, he learned to skate on the outdoor surface of Arvida's Powell Park, and later played for that town's Pee-Wee Orioles minor ice hockey. He played in the 1967, 1968 and 1969 Quebec International Pee-Wee Hockey Tournaments with the Orioles. The family moved to Ottawa in his mid-teen years.

== Playing career ==
Lee was recruited along with his brother David by the Ottawa 67's of the Ontario Hockey League (OHL). He enjoyed a stellar junior career with the Ottawa 67's, where he became one of the few junior players to record more than 400 career points. He was awarded CHL Player of the Year in 1975–76. He set the OHL career scoring record with 213 career goals—a record that lasted for 33 years, until 8 March 2009, when John Tavares scored his 214th to surpass Lee.

After setting a new league record with 81 goals in 1975–76, Lee was chosen in the first round of the 1976 NHL Entry Draft (12th overall) by the Montreal Canadiens. Though he would spend two seasons with their farm team, the Nova Scotia Voyageurs, Lee never played for the Canadiens. On 29 November 1977, Montreal traded Lee, along with Peter Mahovlich, to the Pittsburgh Penguins in exchange for emerging star Pierre Larouche and the rights to forward Peter Marsh.

Lee was a fine offensive addition to the Pens and was a key playmaker on the powerplay. He reached the 30-goal mark twice and scored a personal best 64 points in 1980–81 playing on a line with Greg Malone and Rod Schutt. Unfortunately, the Penguins were not a successful team at that time, and Lee only played 19 playoff games during his five and a half years with the organization. He finished his NHL career with 245 points in 431 games.

Following the 1982–83 season, Lee left North America to play for Düsseldorfer EG of Germany. He scored 340 goals in 450 matches with the club before retiring in 1997.

Lee was inducted into the German Ice Hockey Hall of Fame in 2008.

== Coaching and managing career ==
Lee replaced legendary coach Brian Kilrea behind the Ottawa 67's bench in 1994–95, but a dismal performance by the team prompted Kilrea to return and replace him for the 1995–96 campaign. He would return to Germany the following season and briefly resurrected his playing career.

Lee was head coach of Eisbären Berlin from December 1997 until January 2000. He then was the manager of the club and got promoted to CEO in 2005. In 2008 and 2010 he received "Eishockey News DEL Manager of the Year" honours. During the 2006 Olympic Games in Torino, Lee was an assistant coach of the Swiss National Team.

== Family ==
He is the son of soccer player Eric Lee who competed for Great Britain at the 1948 Summer Olympics and a cousin of comedian Bob Mills.

== Career statistics ==
| | | | Regular season | | | | | Playoffs |
| Season | Team | League | GP | G | A | Pts | PIM | GP | G | A | Pts | PIM |
|---|---|---|---|---|---|---|---|---|---|---|---|---|
| 1971–72 | Ottawa 67's | OHA-Jr. | 12 | 1 | 0 | 1 | 0 | 18 | 2 | 5 | 7 | 11 |
| 1972–73 | Ottawa 67's | OHA-Jr. | 63 | 25 | 51 | 76 | 110 | 9 | 4 | 8 | 12 | 14 |
| 1973–74 | Ottawa 67's | OHA-Jr. | 69 | 38 | 42 | 80 | 40 | 7 | 2 | 1 | 3 | 0 |
| 1974–75 | Ottawa 67's | OHA-Jr. | 70 | 68 | 58 | 126 | 82 | 7 | 6 | 5 | 11 | 6 |
| 1975–76 | Ottawa 67's | OHA-Jr. | 66 | 81 | 80 | 161 | 59 | 11 | 7 | 11 | 18 | 15 |
| 1976–77 | Nova Scotia Voyageurs | AHL | 76 | 33 | 27 | 60 | 88 | 12 | 5 | 3 | 8 | 6 |
| 1977–78 | Nova Scotia Voyageurs | AHL | 23 | 8 | 11 | 19 | 25 | — | — | — | — | — |
| 1977–78 | Pittsburgh Penguins | NHL | 60 | 5 | 13 | 18 | 19 | — | — | — | — | — |
| 1978–79 | Pittsburgh Penguins | NHL | 80 | 32 | 26 | 58 | 24 | 7 | 0 | 3 | 3 | 0 |
| 1979–80 | Pittsburgh Penguins | NHL | 74 | 16 | 29 | 45 | 20 | 4 | 0 | 1 | 1 | 0 |
| 1980–81 | Pittsburgh Penguins | NHL | 80 | 30 | 34 | 64 | 86 | 5 | 0 | 4 | 4 | 4 |
| 1981–82 | Pittsburgh Penguins | NHL | 74 | 18 | 16 | 34 | 98 | 3 | 0 | 0 | 0 | 0 |
| 1982–83 | Baltimore Skipjacks | AHL | 14 | 11 | 6 | 17 | 12 | — | — | — | — | — |
| 1982–83 | Pittsburgh Penguins | NHL | 63 | 13 | 13 | 26 | 10 | — | — | — | — | — |
| 1983–84 | Düsseldorfer EG | 1.GBun | 46 | 25 | 24 | 49 | 56 | 4 | 5 | 1 | 6 | 7 |
| 1984–85 | Düsseldorfer EG | 1.GBun | 33 | 29 | 34 | 63 | 55 | 4 | 3 | 0 | 3 | 27 |
| 1985–86 | Düsseldorfer EG | 1.GBun | 32 | 40 | 34 | 74 | 38 | 9 | 7 | 15 | 22 | 20 |
| 1986–87 | Düsseldorfer EG | 1.GBun | 43 | 40 | 35 | 75 | 77 | — | — | — | — | — |
| 1987–88 | Düsseldorfer EG | 1.GBun | 34 | 31 | 31 | 62 | 24 | 10 | 4 | 5 | 9 | 18 |
| 1988–89 | Düsseldorfer EG | 1.GBun | 36 | 31 | 34 | 65 | 46 | 11 | 11 | 7 | 18 | 14 |
| 1989–90 | Düsseldorfer EG | 1.GBun | 20 | 17 | 18 | 35 | 18 | 11 | 8 | 8 | 16 | 10 |
| 1990–91 | Düsseldorfer EG | 1.GBun | 37 | 23 | 26 | 49 | 26 | 13 | 10 | 5 | 15 | 2 |
| 1991–92 | Düsseldorfer EG | 1.GBun | 44 | 24 | 20 | 44 | 24 | 9 | 4 | 6 | 10 | 6 |
| 1992–93 | Düsseldorfer EG | 1.GBun | 44 | 29 | 26 | 55 | 28 | 11 | 4 | 6 | 10 | 6 |
| 1995–96 | Eisbären Berlin | DEL | 21 | 7 | 6 | 13 | 36 | — | — | — | — | — |
| 1995–96 | EHC Wolfsburg | DEU II | 16 | 14 | 11 | 25 | 61 | — | — | — | — | — |
| 1996–97 | Eisbären Berlin | DEL | 50 | 14 | 13 | 27 | 42 | 8 | 0 | 1 | 1 | 4 |
| NHL totals | | | 431 | 114 | 131 | 245 | 257 | 19 | 0 | 8 | 8 | 4 |
| 1.GBun totals | | | 369 | 289 | 282 | 571 | 392 | 82 | 56 | 53 | 109 | 110 |

== See also ==
- List of National Hockey League players from the United Kingdom

Awards and achievements
| Preceded by Ed Staniowski | CHL Player of the Year; 1976 | Succeeded by Dale McCourt |
| Preceded by Pierre Mondou | Montreal Canadiens first-round draft pick 1976 | Succeeded by Rod Schutt |
