= 1978–79 2nd Bundesliga (ice hockey) season =

The 1978-79 2nd Bundesliga season was the sixth season of the 2nd Bundesliga, the second level of ice hockey in Germany. Twelve teams participated in the league, and Duisburger SC won the championship, and was promoted to the Ice hockey Bundesliga as a result. ERC Freiburg was also promoted. EV Pfronten and EC Peiting were relegated to the Oberliga.

== Regular season ==
	Club	GP	W	T	L	Goals	Pts
1.	Duisburger SC	40	36	1	3	279:120	73
2.	ERC Freiburg	40	32	4	4	253:94	68
3.	EHC 70 München	40	22	7	11	148:116	51
4.	TSV Straubing	40	19	7	14	175:155	45
5.	EC Bad Tölz	40	19	6	15	186:149	44
6.	REV Bremerhaven	40	19	6	15	221:199	44
7.	EV Landsberg	40	17	1	22	183:205	35
8.	EHC Essen-West	40	15	0	25	187:206	30
9.	EV Regensburg	40	9	3	28	120:227	21
10.	SG Nuremberg	40	7	4	29	187:307	18
11.	EV Pfronten	40	4	3	33	109:270	11
12.	EC Peiting	Withdrew just before the season started					
