= Paul Messier (ice hockey) =

Canadian ice hockey player (born 1958)

- Born: 27 January 1958 (age 68) Nottingham, England, United Kingdom
- Height: 6 ft 1 in (185 cm)
- Weight: 160 lb (73 kg; 11 st 6 lb)
- Position: Centre
- Shot: Right
- Played for: Colorado Rockies
- NHL draft: 41st overall, 1978; Colorado Rockies
- Playing career: 1978–1991

Paul Edmond Messier (born 27 January 1958) is a Canadian former professional ice hockey player. He is the older brother of the NHL player Mark Messier.

== Early life ==
Messier was born in Nottingham, England. His family moved to Canada when he was young and he grew up playing ice hockey in the Edmonton minor system.

== Career ==
Messier played for the University of Denver and briefly in the National Hockey League for the Colorado Rockies. In 1994, he was head coach and general manager of the Tampa Bay Tritons, a professional roller hockey team that played in Roller Hockey International for one season. His brother, Mark, was the team's owner.

== Personal life ==
Messier has two children from a previous marriage. He manages one of his brother's investments, a small hotel in Harbour Island, Bahamas.

== Career statistics ==
=== Regular season and playoffs ===
			Regular season					Playoffs
Season	Team	League	GP	G	A	Pts	PIM	GP	G	A	Pts	PIM
1973–74	Edmonton Mets	AJHL	59	37	39	76	43	—	—	—	—	—
1974–75	Spruce Grove Mets	AJHL	57	45	56	101	48	11	7	13	20	10
1974–75	Edmonton Oil Kings	WCHL	1	2	0	2	0	—	—	—	—	—
1975–76	Spruce Grove Mets	AJHL	44	32	45	77	46	10	4	12	16	11
1975–76	Edmonton Oil Kings	WCHL	11	1	12	13	2	—	—	—	—	—
1976–77	University of Denver	WCHA	30	15	12	27	46	—	—	—	—	—
1977–78	University of Denver	WCHA	38	20	31	51	53	—	—	—	—	—
1978–79	Tulsa Oilers	CHL	27	3	4	7	11	—	—	—	—	—
1978–79	Philadelphia Firebirds	AHL	16	2	3	5	18	—	—	—	—	—
1978–79	Colorado Rockies	NHL	9	0	0	0	0	—	—	—	—	—
1979–80	Fort Worth Texans	CHL	7	0	1	1	2	—	—	—	—	—
1979–80	Birmingham Bulls	CHL	50	6	14	20	14	2	2	1	3	0
1980–81	Wichita Wind	CHL	45	13	13	26	26	—	—	—	—	—
1981–82	Binghamton Whalers	AHL	62	26	37	63	74	15	5	6	11	2
1982–83	Moncton Alpines	AHL	77	27	50	77	30	—	—	—	—	—
1983–84	ECD Iserlohn	GER	46	24	26	50	40	—	—	—	—	—
1984–85	Mannheimer ERC	GER	36	32	31	63	35	9	5	8	13	14
1985–86	Mannheimer ERC	GER	35	32	33	65	66	3	0	2	2	0
1986–87	Mannheimer ERC	GER	36	32	33	65	60	10	10	2	12	0
1987–88	Mannheimer ERC	GER	36	21	29	50	40	8	4	9	13	8
1988–89	Mannheimer ERC	GER	36	32	17	49	30	9	3	11	14	6
1989–90	Mannheimer ERC	GER	36	11	23	34	22	3	2	2	4	2
1990–91	HC Bolzano	ITA	2	1	1	2	0	—	—	—	—	—
GER totals			261	184	192	376	293	42	24	34	58	30
NHL totals			9	0	0	0	0	—	—	—	—	—

== See also ==
- List of National Hockey League players from the United Kingdom
