= 1964–65 ice hockey Bundesliga season =

German ice hockey season

The 1964–65 Ice hockey Bundesliga season was the seventh season of the Ice hockey Bundesliga, the top level of ice hockey in Germany. Eight teams participated in the league, and EV Fussen won the championship.

== First round ==
	Club	GP	W	T	L	GF–GA	Pts
1.	EV Füssen (M)	14	14	0	0	93:24	28:0
2.	EC Bad Tölz	14	9	0	5	57:59	18:10
3.	ESV Kaufbeuren	14	7	2	5	61:49	16:12
4.	Mannheimer ERC	14	7	1	6	65:54	15:13
5.	SC Riessersee	14	6	0	8	39:54	12:16
6.	EV Landshut	14	5	1	8	34:51	11:17
7.	Krefelder EV	14	3	2	9	39:55	8:20
8.	TSC Eintracht Dortmund (N)	14	2	0	12	32:74	4:24

== Final round ==
	Club	GP	W	T	L	GF–GA	Pts
1.	EV Füssen (M)	20	18	1	1	133:48	37:3
2.	EC Bad Tölz	20	12	1	7	53:81	25:15
3.	Mannheimer ERC	20	10	1	9	90:87	21:19
4.	ESV Kaufbeuren	20	8	2	10	82:82	18:22

== Qualification round ==
	Club	GP	W	T	L	GF–GA	Pts
1.	SC Riessersee	20	9	2	9	79:67	20:20
2.	EV Landshut	20	9	2	9	58:67	20:20
3.	Krefelder EV	20	4	5	11	56:77	13:27
4.	Eintracht Dortmund (N)	20	2	2	16	45:108	6:34

== Relegation ==
			Series	1	2
VfL Bad Nauheim	–	Eintracht Dortmund	19:3	11:0	8:3
