= 1967–68 ice hockey Bundesliga season =

German ice hockey season

The 1967–68 Ice hockey Bundesliga season was the 10th season of the Ice hockey Bundesliga, the top level of ice hockey in Germany. 10 teams participated in the league, and EV Fussen won the championship. Krefelder EV won the DEV-Pokal.

== First round ==
=== West ===
	Club	GP	W	T	L	GF–GA	Pts
1.	Düsseldorfer EG (M)	8	5	1	2	41:29	11:5
2.	Preußen Krefeld	8	5	0	3	44:46	10:6
3.	Mannheimer ERC	8	4	0	4	45:27	8:8
4.	Krefelder EV	8	3	1	4	38:39	7:9
5.	VfL Bad Nauheim (N)	8	1	2	5	25:52	4:12

=== South ===
	Club	GP	W	T	L	GF–GA	Pts
1.	EC Bad Tölz	8	7	0	1	47:18	14:2
2.	EV Füssen	8	5	1	2	51:22	11:5
3.	EV Landshut	8	4	1	3	27:21	9:7
4.	FC Bayern München (N)	8	3	0	5	24:38	6:10
5.	SG Oberstdorf/Sonthofen (N)	8	0	0	8	11:61	0:16

== Relegation round ==
=== West ===
	Club	GP	W	T	L	GF–GA	Pts
1.	Krefelder EV	20	16	0	4	139:64	32:8
2.	VfL Bad Nauheim	20	12	0	8	90:67	24:16
3.	Eintracht Frankfurt	20	12	0	8	89:82	24:16
4.	Kölner EK	20	11	0	9	96:74	22:18
5.	Berliner Schlittschuhclub	20	5	0	15	74:122	10:30
6.	EC Deilinghofen	20	4	0	16	54:133	8:32

=== South ===
	Club	GP	W	T	L	GF–GA	Pts
1.	SC Riessersee	20	12	4	4	128:58	28:12
2.	Augsburger EV	20	12	2	6	112:93	26:14
3.	FC Bayern München	20	11	2	7	109:75	24:16
4.	ESV Kaufbeuren	20	12	0	8	77:72	24:16
5.	SG Oberstdorf/Sonthofen	20	5	3	12	69:109	13:27
6.	EV Rosenheim	20	2	1	17	58:146	5:35

==== 3rd place ====
FC Bayern München - ESV Kaufbeuren 5:3

== DEV-Pokal ==
			Series	1	2
SC Riessersee	–	Krefelder EV	4:17	2:7	2:10

== Final round ==
	Club	GP	W	T	L	GF–GA	Pts
1.	EV Füssen	20	16	2	2	96:42	34:6
2.	EC Bad Tölz	20	13	2	5	85:48	28:12
3.	EV Landshut	20	11	1	8	71:72	23:17
4.	Düsseldorfer EG (M)	20	9	3	8	64:55	21:19
5.	Mannheimer ERC	20	6	1	13	58:82	13:27
6.	Preußen Krefeld	20	0	1	19	49:124	1:39
