= 1959–60 ice hockey Bundesliga season =

German ice hockey season

The 1959–60 Ice hockey Bundesliga season was the second season of the Ice hockey Bundesliga, the top level of ice hockey in Germany. Eight teams participated in the league, and SC Riessersee won the championship.

== Regular season ==
	Club	GP	W	T	L	GF–GA	Pts
1.	SC Riessersee	14	12	1	1	99:31	25:3
2.	EV Füssen (M)	14	12	0	2	95:41	24:4
3.	EC Bad Tölz	14	7	3	4	102:47	17:11
4.	Krefelder EV	14	5	1	8	59:77	11:17
5.	Mannheimer ERC	14	5	1	8	49:67	11:17
6.	Preußen Krefeld	14	5	0	9	61:83	10:18
7.	VfL Bad Nauheim (N)	14	3	2	9	46:90	8:20
8.	ESV Kaufbeuren (N)	14	3	0	11	47:132	6:22

== Relegation ==
			Series	1	2
ESV Kaufbeuren	–	Eintracht Dortmund	4:9	3:6	1:3
