= 1960–61 ice hockey Bundesliga season =

German ice hockey season

The 1960–61 Ice hockey Bundesliga season was the third season of the Ice hockey Bundesliga, the top level of ice hockey in Germany. Eight teams participated in the league, and EV Fussen won the championship.

== Regular season ==
	Club	GP	W	T	L	GF–GA	Pts
1.	EV Füssen	28	22	4	2	176:57	48:8
2.	EC Bad Tölz	28	21	3	4	121:53	45:11
3.	SC Riessersee (M)	28	19	2	7	144:79	40:16
4.	Krefelder EV	28	13	3	12	117:108	29:27
5.	Mannheimer ERC	28	10	2	16	91:109	22:34
6.	Preußen Krefeld	28	10	2	16	97:137	22:34
7.	TSC Eintracht Dortmund (N)	28	8	0	20	78:128	16:40
8.	VfL Bad Nauheim	28	1	0	27	53:203	2:54

== Relegation ==
			Series	1	2
ESV Kaufbeuren	–	VfL Bad Nauheim	16:3	10:1	6:2
