= 1965–66 ice hockey Bundesliga season =

German ice hockey season

The 1965–66 Ice hockey Bundesliga season was the eighth season of the Ice hockey Bundesliga, the top level of ice hockey in Germany. 10 teams participated in the league, and EC Bad Tolz won the championship.

== First round ==
	Club	GP	W	T	L	GF–GA	Pts
1.	EV Füssen (M)	18	16	2	0	110:39	34:2
2.	ESV Kaufbeuren	18	11	1	6	84:75	23:13
3.	EC Bad Tölz	18	10	1	7	76:48	21:15
4.	Düsseldorfer EG (N)	18	10	1	7	66:57	21:15
5.	Mannheimer ERC	18	8	1	9	61:73	17:19
6.	Krefelder EV	18	7	1	10	64:73	15:21
7.	Preußen Krefeld (N)	18	7	1	10	58:71	15:21
8.	EV Landshut	18	5	3	10	50:73	13:23
9.	VfL Bad Nauheim (N)	18	5	1	12	70:102	11:25
10.	SC Riessersee	18	4	2	12	45:71	10:26

== Qualification round ==
	Club	GP	W	T	L	GF–GA	Pts
1.	SC Riessersee	8	5	0	3	28:15	10:6
2.	Preußen Krefeld (N)	8	5	0	3	31:24	10:6
3.	EV Landshut	8	4	0	4	25:30	8:8
4.	Krefelder EV	8	4	0	4	33:25	8:8
5.	VfL Bad Nauheim (N)	8	2	0	6	19:44	4:12

=== Final ===
- SC Riessersee – Preußen Krefeld 6:4

== Final round ==
	Club	GP	W	T	L	GF–GA	Pts
1.	EC Bad Tölz	8	5	1	2	36:19	11:5
2.	EV Füssen (M)	8	4	1	3	41:23	9:7
3.	Düsseldorfer EG (N)	8	3	2	3	27:37	8:8
4.	Mannheimer ERC	8	3	1	4	20:34	7:9
5.	ESV Kaufbeuren	8	2	1	5	22:33	5:11
