= 1962–63 ice hockey Bundesliga season =

German ice hockey season

The 1962–63 Ice hockey Bundesliga season was the fifth season of the Ice hockey Bundesliga, the top level of ice hockey in Germany. Eight teams participated in the league, and EV Fussen won the championship.

== First round ==
	Club	GP	W	T	L	GF–GA	Pts
1.	EC Bad Tölz (M)	14	12	2	0	123:26	26:2
2.	EV Füssen	14	10	3	1	71:37	23:5
3.	Mannheimer ERC	14	7	1	6	54:54	15:13
4.	SC Riessersee	14	5	2	7	58:52	12:16
5.	Krefelder EV	14	4	2	8	52:70	10:18
6.	ESV Kaufbeuren	14	4	1	9	50:81	9:19
7.	Preußen Krefeld	14	4	1	9	35:74	9:19
8.	TSC Eintracht Dortmund	14	3	2	9	35:84	8:20

== Consolation round ==
	Club	GP	W	T	L	GF–GA	Pts
1.	EV Füssen	20	14	4	2	119:67	32:8
2.	EC Bad Tölz (M)	20	13	3	4	144:56	29:11
3.	Mannheimer ERC	20	9	2	9	73:81	20:20
4.	SC Riessersee	20	7	5	8	85:80	19:21

== Final round ==
	Club	GP	W	T	L	GF–GA	Pts
1.	Krefelder EV	20	9	3	8	92:89	21:19
2.	ESV Kaufbeuren	20	8	1	11	80:109	17:23
3.	Preußen Krefeld	20	6	1	13	54:99	13:27
4.	TSC Eintracht Dortmund	20	3	3	14	51:115	9:31

== Relegation ==
			Series	1	2
EV Landshut	–	TSC Eintracht Dortmund	9:6	4:2	5:4
