= 1961–62 ice hockey Bundesliga season =

German ice hockey season

The 1961–62 Ice hockey Bundesliga season was the fourth season of the Ice hockey Bundesliga, the top level of ice hockey in Germany. Eight teams participated in the league, and EC Bad Tolz won the championship.

== First round ==
	Club	GP	W	T	L	GF–GA	Pts
1.	EC Bad Tölz	14	13	0	1	89:33	26:2
2.	EV Füssen (M)	14	11	2	1	79:38	24:4
3.	SC Riessersee	14	7	1	6	52:40	15:13
4.	Preußen Krefeld	14	5	4	5	57:47	14:14
5.	ESV Kaufbeuren (N)	14	7	0	7	57:79	14:14
6.	Mannheimer ERC	14	3	2	9	49:67	8:20
7.	Krefelder EV	14	3	0	11	36:84	6:22
8.	TSC Eintracht Dortmund	14	2	1	11	38:69	5:23

== Final round ==
	Club	GP	W	T	L	GF–GA	Pts
1.	EC Bad Tölz	20	17	0	3	118:59	34:6
2.	EV Füssen (M)	20	15	2	3	108:55	32:8
3.	SC Riessersee	20	10	2	8	76:63	22:18
4.	Preußen Krefeld	20	5	5	10	75:81	15:25

== Qualification round ==
	Club	GP	W	T	L	GF–GA	Pts
1.	ESV Kaufbeuren (N)	20	9	0	11	80:109	18:22
2.	Krefelder EV	20	7	1	12	60:101	15:25
3.	Mannheimer ERC	20	5	3	12	74:88	13:27
4.	Eintracht Dortmund	20	5	3	12	58:93	11:29

== Relegation ==
			Series	1	2
EV Landshut	–	TSC Eintracht Dortmund	2:6	0:1	2:5
