= 1970–71 ice hockey Bundesliga season =

The 1970–71 Ice hockey Bundesliga season was the 13th season of the Ice hockey Bundesliga, the top level of ice hockey in Germany. 10 teams participated in the league, and EV Fussen won the championship.

== Regular season ==
	Club	GP	W	T	L	GF–GA	Pts
1.	EV Füssen	36	33	1	2	181:81	67:5
2.	Düsseldorfer EG	36	26	2	8	195:114	54:18
3.	EC Bad Tölz	36	24	3	9	181:113	51:21
4.	EV Landshut (M)	36	23	3	10	195:111	49:23
5.	SC Riessersee	36	19	4	13	143:111	42:30
6.	Augsburger EV	36	12	3	21	135:165	27:45
7.	Krefelder EV	36	11	2	23	155:179	24:48
8.	ESV Kaufbeuren	36	11	1	24	96:166	23:49
9.	VfL Bad Nauheim	36	8	1	27	130:218	17:55
10.	Mannheimer ERC	36	3	0	33	112:265	6:66
