= 1963–64 ice hockey Bundesliga season =

German ice hockey season

The 1963–64 Ice hockey Bundesliga season was the sixth season of the Ice hockey Bundesliga, the top level of ice hockey in Germany. Eight teams participated in the league, and EV Fussen won the championship.

== First round ==
	Club	GP	W	T	L	GF–GA	Pts
1.	EV Füssen (M)	14	12	1	1	84:24	25:3
2.	EC Bad Tölz	14	9	1	4	59:44	19:9
3.	ESV Kaufbeuren	14	8	2	4	53:56	18:10
4.	SC Riessersee	14	6	3	5	45:38	15:13
5.	EV Landshut (N)	14	5	1	8	47:56	11:17
6.	Krefelder EV	14	4	3	7	40:55	11:17
7.	Mannheimer ERC	14	3	2	9	38:60	8:20
8.	Preußen Krefeld	14	1	3	10	37:68	5:23

== Final round ==
	Club	GP	W	T	L	GF–GA	Pts
1.	EV Füssen (M)	20	17	2	1	117:36	36:4
2.	EC Bad Tölz	20	11	2	7	81:70	24:16
3.	SC Riessersee	20	9	3	8	70:66	21:19
4.	ESV Kaufbeuren	20	9	2	9	71:90	20:20

== Qualification round ==
	Club	GP	W	T	L	GF–GA	Pts
1.	EV Landshut (N)	20	8	3	9	68:72	19:21
2.	Mannheimer ERC	20	7	4	9	63:71	18:22
3.	Krefelder EV	20	6	5	9	65:75	17:23
4.	Preußen Krefeld	20	1	3	16	50:105	5:35
