= 1969–70 ice hockey Bundesliga season =

German ice hockey season

The 1969–70 Ice hockey Bundesliga season was the 12th season of the Ice hockey Bundesliga, the top level of ice hockey in Germany. 12 teams participated in the league, and EV Landshut won the championship.

== First round ==
	Club	GP	W	T	L	GF–GA	Pts
1.	EV Landshut	22	18	2	2	120:44	38:6
2.	EV Füssen (M)	22	16	2	4	117:59	34:10
3.	EC Bad Tölz	22	15	2	5	110:66	32:12
4.	SC Riessersee	22	14	0	8	94:62	28:16
5.	Augsburger EV	22	12	2	8	96:70	26:18
6.	Krefelder EV	22	10	2	10	82:93	22:22
7.	Düsseldorfer EG	22	9	3	10	54:60	21:23
8.	VfL Bad Nauheim	22	8	3	11	77:86	19:25
9.	Mannheimer ERC	22	8	2	12	81:97	18:26
10.	ESV Kaufbeuren (N)	22	6	3	13	70:97	15:29
11.	Kölner EK (N)	22	3	2	17	64:130	8:36
12.	Eintracht Frankfurt	22	1	1	20	68:169	3:41

== Relegation round ==
	Club	GP	W	T	L	GF–GA	Pts
1.	ESV Kaufbeuren	16	13	1	2	106:42	27:5
2.	Mannheimer ERC	16	13	1	2	86:32	27:5
3.	Eintracht Frankfurt	16	10	2	4	88:74	22:10
4.	EV Rosenheim	16	9	2	5	71:54	20:12
5.	Kölner EK	16	5	3	8	65:81	13:19
6.	EC Deilinghofen	16	6	0	10	62:73	12:20
7.	SG Nürnberg	16	6	0	10	68:82	12:20
8.	SG Oberstdorf/Sonthofen	16	4	0	12	62:95	8:24
9.	BFC Preussen	16	1	1	14	36:111	3:29

== Final round ==
	Club	GP	W	T	L	GF–GA	Pts
1.	EV Landshut	14	10	2	2	64:36	22: 6
2.	EC Bad Tölz	14	8	3	3	67:40	19: 9
3.	SC Riessersee	14	8	1	5	59:44	17:11
4.	EV Füssen (M)	14	8	0	6	63:54	16:12
5.	Augsburger EV	14	7	1	6	70:61	15:13
6.	VfL Bad Nauheim	14	4	1	9	44:68	9:19
7.	Krefelder EV	14	4	0	10	43:85	8:20
8.	Düsseldorfer EG	14	2	2	10	37:59	6:22
