= 1968–69 ice hockey Bundesliga season =

German ice hockey season

The 1968–69 Ice hockey Bundesliga season was the 11th season of the Ice hockey Bundesliga, the top level of ice hockey in Germany. 12 teams participated in the league, and EV Fussen won the championship.

== First round ==
=== West ===
| | Club | GP | W | T | L | GF–GA | Pts |
|---|---|---|---|---|---|---|---|
| 1. | VfL Bad Nauheim | 10 | 8 | 0 | 2 | 43:34 | 16:4 |
| 2. | Düsseldorfer EG | 10 | 7 | 1 | 2 | 52:14 | 15:5 |
| 3. | Mannheimer ERC | 10 | 5 | 1 | 4 | 41:32 | 11:9 |
| 4. | Krefelder EV | 10 | 4 | 0 | 6 | 39:35 | 8:12 |
| 5. | Eintracht Frankfurt (N) | 10 | 2 | 1 | 7 | 31:59 | 5:15 |
| 6. | Preußen Krefeld | 10 | 2 | 1 | 7 | 20:52 | 5:15 |

=== South ===
| | Club | GP | W | T | L | GF–GA | Pts |
|---|---|---|---|---|---|---|---|
| 1. | EV Füssen (M) | 10 | 9 | 0 | 1 | 53:25 | 18:2 |
| 2. | EC Bad Tölz | 10 | 7 | 0 | 3 | 43:19 | 14:6 |
| 3. | Augsburger EV (N) | 10 | 6 | 1 | 3 | 40:45 | 13:7 |
| 4. | EV Landshut | 10 | 5 | 0 | 5 | 35:26 | 10:10 |
| 5. | SC Riessersee (N) | 10 | 1 | 1 | 8 | 33:57 | 3:17 |
| 6. | FC Bayern Munich | 10 | 1 | 0 | 9 | 26:58 | 2:18 |

== Relegation round ==
=== West ===
| | Club | GP | W | T | L | GF–GA | Pts |
|---|---|---|---|---|---|---|---|
| 1. | Krefelder EV | 20 | 13 | 5 | 2 | 144:53 | 31:9 |
| 2. | Eintracht Frankfurt | 20 | 12 | 3 | 5 | 98:76 | 27:13 |
| 3. | Kölner EK | 20 | 11 | 4 | 5 | 106:67 | 26:14 |
| 4. | EC Deilinghofen | 20 | 9 | 2 | 9 | 104:74 | 20:20 |
| 5. | Preußen Krefeld | 20 | 7 | 0 | 13 | 77:90 | 14:26 |
| 6. | Berliner Schlittschuhclub | 20 | 1 | 0 | 19 | 37:206 | 2:38 |

=== South ===
| | Club | GP | W | T | L | GF–GA | Pts |
|---|---|---|---|---|---|---|---|
| 1. | EV Landshut | 20 | 15 | 4 | 1 | 121:39 | 34:6 |
| 2. | SC Riessersee | 20 | 13 | 3 | 4 | 120:60 | 29:11 |
| 3. | FC Bayern Munich | 20 | 12 | 1 | 7 | 96:76 | 25:15 |
| 4. | ESV Kaufbeuren | 20 | 9 | 4 | 7 | 80:59 | 22:18 |
| 5. | EV Rosenheim | 20 | 3 | 0 | 17 | 55:142 | 6:34 |
| 6. | SG Oberstdorf/Sonthofen | 20 | 1 | 2 | 17 | 51:147 | 4:36 |

== Final round ==
| | Club | GP | W | T | L | GF–GA | Pts |
|---|---|---|---|---|---|---|---|
| 1. | EV Füssen (M) | 20 | 16 | 2 | 2 | 106:35 | 34:6 |
| 2. | Düsseldorfer EG | 20 | 12 | 1 | 7 | 73:56 | 25:15 |
| 3. | EC Bad Tölz | 20 | 11 | 1 | 8 | 84:60 | 23:17 |
| 4. | Mannheimer ERC | 20 | 10 | 1 | 9 | 74:70 | 21:19 |
| 5. | Augsburger EV (N) | 20 | 5 | 0 | 15 | 63:122 | 10:30 |
| 6. | VfL Bad Nauheim | 20 | 3 | 1 | 16 | 48:105 | 7:33 |
