= Eishockey-Bundesliga =

Ice hockey league in Germany

- Most recent season or competition: 1993–94 ice hockey Bundesliga season
- Formerly: Oberliga (1948–58)
- Sport: Ice hockey
- Founded: 1958
- First season: 1958–59
- Folded: 1994
- Country: Germany
- Most titles: EV Füssen (9) Düsseldorfer EG (7) Kölner Haie (6)
- Relegation to: 2nd Bundesliga
- Related competitions: Deutsche Eishockey Liga 2nd Bundesliga

The Eishockey-Bundesliga ("Federal Ice Hockey League") was formed in 1958 as the elite hockey competition in the Federal Republic of Germany, replacing the Oberliga in this position. From the 1994–95 season, it was in turn replaced by the Deutsche Eishockey Liga, which now also carries the name 1st Bundesliga in its logo. The DEL, originally administered by the DEB, the German Ice Hockey Federation, became an independent league in 1997.

With the German reunion, the Bundesliga became a truly nationwide league, initially including two teams from the former East Germany.

== History ==
=== Pre-Bundesliga era ===
Ice hockey was first played in Germany in 1887, in Berlin, and it was there that the first ice hockey department of a sports club was formed, as part of the Berliner SC.

The history of the German ice hockey championship began in 1912 when the Berliner SC won the first edition of the competition. The BSC was also to become the most dominating side in German ice hockey before the Second World War, winning 17 out of a possible 21 editions until 1937, with its best run of six consecutive championships between 1928 and 1933. The MTV München (1922), SC Riessersee (1927 & 1935) and Brandenburg Berlin (1934) were the only other clubs to earn some honours in this era.

From 1938 onwards, the national championship featured Austrian clubs as well and twice the title went to Vienna after this. The war disrupted the championship and between 1941 and 1947 only one season was played, in 1944. In this era, teams came from all over Germany, including areas that would not be part of Germany any more after 1945.

Ice hockey restarted in the occupied Germany in 1947 and began with two regional leagues, north and south, of which the two champions played a national final, won by SC Riessersee, which marked the beginning of a Bavarian dominance in the sport in Germany. In the following year, the Eishockey-Oberliga (English: Ice hockey premier league) was formed, consisting of six clubs, those being the SC Riessersee, EV Füssen, Augsburger EV, Preußen Krefeld, Krefelder EV and VfL Bad Nauheim. The EV Füssen soon became the dominating side of this era, winning seven titles in twelve seasons, six of those in series from 1953 to 1958. Apart from Füssen, the Oberliga proved an inconsistent league, with members fluctuating season-by-season and consequently, in 1958, the decision was made to form a Bundesliga, the first ever league in Germany to carry that name.

=== The 1950s ===
In autumn 1958, the new Ice hockey Bundesliga started with eight clubs in its first season. Apart from Riessersee, Füssen and the two teams from Krefeld, the EC Bad Tölz, Mannheimer ERC, Düsseldorfer EG and the SG Weßling/Starnberg were also part of this first season. The league was played in a home-and-away format, 14 games per team, with no play-offs at the end, which were only introduced in 1980. The top placed team in the league won the championship, the EV Füssen, while the teams placed seventh and eighth were relegated, the DEG and Weßling/Starnberg. And while the champions only lost one game all season Weßling/Starnberg managed to only win one, with the club promptly dissolved at the end.

In its second season, the Bundesliga saw the end of EV Füssen's series of seven championships in a row, with the title going to SC Riessersee instead after a championship-clinching game at Garmisch-Partenkirchen in front of 12,000 that saw SCR win 6–4. Riessersee only lost one game all season, away against EVF, and drew once, the first 0-all draw in Bundesliga history. In a league with an unchanged modus, the two new clubs, VfL Bad Nauheim and ESV Kaufbeuren, finished last. Only one team was relegated however, Kaufbeuren. The season also saw the league's biggest ever score and highest defeat when Bad Tölz beat Kaufbeuren 28–0.

=== The 1960s ===
In its third season, 1960–61, the league remained at a strength of eight clubs but doubled the number of season games to 28 per team. Füssen rectified the slip-up of the previous year, winning the league again, Bad Nauheim was relegated and new team Eintracht Dortmund survived in seventh place.

The 1961–62 modus was different again from the previous year. After 14 games each the league was split into top- and bottom eight, with each group playing another home-and-away series just against the teams in its group. The reason for this was the large gap between top and bottom clubs which resulted in very one-sided games. The EC Bad Tölz became the third different champion in four seasons while newly promoted club ESV Kaufbeuren finished fifth and Eintracht Dortmund last. Direct relegation was however abolished and Dortmund had the chance to hold the league in a promotion-relegation round, which it completed successfully.

The following year saw Füssen on top again and Dortmund last in an unchanged modus. This time however the club from Westphalia could not hold the league and EV Landshut was promoted instead. EV Füssen also took out the next two championships, 1963–64 and 1964–65, while Preußen Krefeld (1964) and Eintracht Dortmund (1965) were the relegated teams. In between, in June 1963, the DEB was formed, ice hockey having previously been part of the Deutsche Eissport-Verband.

The 1965–66 season saw the league expanded to ten teams, with the Düsseldorfer EG, Preußen Krefeld and VfL Bad Nauheim all making a return. After a home-and-away season of 18 games each, which the EV Füssen won with an eleven-point advantage, the league was split again between top and bottom, now two groups of five. Unlike in the past however, points from the first part of the season could not be transferred and EC Bad Tölz was crowned champions with a two-point advantage despite having earned nine points less than EVF. At the bottom of the league, the VfL Bad Nauheim dropped out again and was replaced by the former champions Berliner SC.

The 1966–67 season, in retrospect, marked a turning point of German ice hockey, also not an instantaneous one, the shift from the dominance of small-town Bavarian teams to the clubs from the large cities. The Düsseldorfer EG ended a spell of championships for Bavarian clubs that had lasted since 1951 and also condemned the EV Füssen to a fourth-place finish, the worst in its post war era at the time. The league itself was played with ten teams again, but the modus had changed. A northern and a southern division of five clubs each was played followed by a six team championship round of the best three of each division. The bottom clubs in the league had to face the best teams of the second tier in the promotion-relegation round and SC Riessersee, ESV Kaufbeuren and Berliner SC were all relegated and replaced with the VfL Bad Nauheim, the short-lived merger club SG Oberstdorf/Sonthofen and the equally short-lived ice hockey department of FC Bayern Munich. The season also produced the second-ever goalless draw when neither Mannheim nor Düsseldorfer scored during their game, something that would not happen again until 1987–88.

EV Füssen took out the league title once more in 1967–68, in a season with only slight modifications to the modus. Of the bottom two teams of each division which had to defend their league place the northern clubs both succeeded while the southern clubs both failed. SG Oberstdorf/Sonthofen consequently folded while the FC Bayern was saved by the fact that the league was expanded to twelve teams.

The league expansion of 1968 is generally explained by the fact that the German ice hockey federation, the DEB, wanted the two clubs that had finished third and failed in the promotion round in the league as they were big names, the ice hockey departments of FC Bayern and Eintracht Frankfurt. Neither impressed during a season that saw EV Füssen defend its title, the last club to do so until 1987. New to the league, apart from Frankfurt, were the Augsburger EV, while the SC Riessersee made a return. At the end of the season, FC Bayern was relegated and soon disbanded its ice hockey department. Preußen Krefeld was the other team dropping out of the league and the club folded only two years later.

The league remained at a strength of twelve teams for the 1969–70 season, with ESV Kaufbeuren and Kölner EK the new teams. The modus however had been changed again, all teams played a home-and-away round in a single division, 22 games each. At the end of this, the best eight teams played another home-and-away round against each other. The championship was won for the first time by the EV Landshut, while Cologne and Frankfurt were relegated. The Bad Tölz versus Bad Nauheim produced the highest ever draw in the league when the two sides finished the game with scoren eight goals each, a result repeat later a number of times in the 1980s.

=== The 1970s ===
The 1970–71 saw the league reduced to ten teams but the number of season games remaining at 36 per club. Because of this, the league did not have a new club in it and ended with the familiar result of EV Füssen taking out another championship. In this season, the league also introduced the Friday-Sunday rhythm of games, with a team playing one home and one away game per weekend, a system that would remain in place for the duration of the league and beyond. At the bottom end, the Mannheimer ERC was relegated, to be replaced with Preußen Krefeld, at least in theory.

Only nine clubs competed in the 1971–72 season because Preußen Krefeld, who had won promotion in an impressive fashion the previous year, folded and was never to reform. Consequently, no club had to fear relegation while the Düsseldorfer EG, the best supported club in Germany with a spectator average of almost 10,000 per home game, took out the championship while EV Füssen came second.

The following year, this order was reversed with the EVF first and the DEG second. It was to be the last-ever title for the club from Füssen and marked the end of the Bavarian dominance, with championships going to the state now becoming as rare as they had been commonplace. The league modus experienced another change when, instead of ten clubs the league was expanded to eleven, courtesy to the promotion of both Berliner SC and EV Rosenheim. The later was found to be uncompetitive in the league however, only accumulating twelve points in 40 season games and being relegated again. Alongside the EVR, ESV Kaufbeuren was also relegated while the big-spending newcomer from Berlin finished fifth. It was also the last season of the Oberliga as the second division, the 2nd Bundesliga being introduced in 1973.

After a 37-year wait, the Berliner SC won another championship in 1973–74 in a league which had returned to ten clubs and 36 season games. New to the Bundesliga was the Kölner EC while the Augsburger EV was relegated and the ESV Kaufbeuren promoted.

The 1974–75 seasons saw a continuation of the south–north shift of German ice hockey, with the financially strong northern clubs recruiting a large number of players from the southern ones. Consequently, spectator numbers for the Bavarian clubs like Riessersee, Bad Tölz and Füssen went down, making it even more difficult to retain their young players. In the north, another championship was won by the well-supported DEG, with Berlin coming second. At the bottom end, Kaufbeuren was replaced by Rosenheim for the next season.

The league modus unchanged in 1975–76, the Berliner SC won its second post-war title in convincing fashion while, at the bottom, the last three clubs finished on equal points and the goals for-against had to decide who would finish on the tenth and last place and be relegated. It was to be the EC Bad Tölz, thereby disappearing from the Bundesliga for good, replaced by the Augsburger EV.

From 1976 onwards, the first golden era of the Kölner EC began with the club taking out titles in 1976–77 and 1978–79. The team from Cologne was generally the first to be seen as bought together rather than having grown. The success of the club was brought about by the club's chairman, Jochem Erlemann, an investment banker. Unknown to club and players, Erlemann invested other people's money into the club, without their approval and eventually would serve eight years in jail for it. On the ice the league modus had been slightly altered again. After the 36 games of the regular round a championship- and relegation round was added. The top six played for the championship while the bottom four played against relegation, in another home-and-away series within each group. In the end, new club AEV was relegated from the league again, under unfortunate circumstances on the last day of the season, while a club joined the league that had never played at top level before, the EC Deilinghofen.

The SC Riessersee, often branded as a rough team, won its first championship since 1960 in the 1977–78 season, one point ahead of Berliner SC after 46 games in a for once unchanged modus. At the bottom of the league, Deilinghofen, who had only been promoted after 2nd Bundesliga champions ESV Kaufbeuren declined for financial reasons, was hopelessly outclassed and thirteen points behind the saving ninth place.

The 1978–79 season saw the league expanded to twelve teams. This meant, Deilinghofen did not have to step down to the 2nd Bundesliga and Augsburger EV and Mannheimer ERC were added. Because of the insolvency of the Krefelder EV who dropped out of the league, the ESV Kaufbeuren was also admitted to the league while the financial collapse of the EV Rosenheim meant that the ice hockey department joined the SB Rosenheim instead, a lucky move that would soon pay off. Apart from the financial troubles, Augsburger EV would also declare insolvency at the end of the season and drop down to the Oberliga, Mannheim and Rosenheim were also accused of fielding players without correct transfer papers. Consequently, both clubs had points deducted but later reinstalled again. Mannheim, under coach Heinz Weisenbach, also started a trend that would soon become commonplace in the Bundesliga, to import Canadian players of German origins, the Deutschkanadier, who would be eligible to play for the West German ice hockey team and not take up any of the limited spots for foreigners per team. On the ice, the expansion meant that the main round was reduced from four to two games per team, 22 each. and the champions and relegation rounds were staged with six teams each. The Kölner EC won its second title while Augsburg and Kaufbeuren dropped out again. The game between Düsseldorfer and Berlin that season saw 22 goals scored, with the final result of 12–10 being the first time that two clubs in the same Bundesliga game scored in the double figures.

The search for the perfect modus continued in 1979–80, with an extra round introduced after the regular season. The twelve clubs were split into three groups of four, with the best eight overall than entering the championship round while the worst four played against relegation. The complicated modus was blamed for Riessersee not defending its title, which went, for the first time, to the Mannheimer ERC and its Canadian-German star players. While Mannheim was, unjustly criticised for playing them other clubs already fielded foreigners with fake passports, which would blow out the following season. At the bottom of the league, new club Duisburger SC had no trouble saving itself in seventh place while ERC Freiburg came a distant last.

During the 1979–80 season, the league scheduled a break in its scheduling to allow players to compete in ice hockey at the 1980 Winter Olympics with the Germany men's national ice hockey team.

=== The 1980s ===
The highlight of the 1980–81 season should have been the introduction of play-offs to the league, for which the best eight teams qualified, and SC Riessesee's last-ever championship. However, the season was overshadowed by one of the biggest scandals in German ice hockey. The German consulate in Edmonton, Alberta, Canada, had sent a message to the DEB highlighting that a number of Canadian ice hockey players were living and playing in Germany with fake German passports. Eventually, seven players at the Duisburger SC and three at the Kölner EC were found to have obtained fake passports, which were sold in a bar in Essen for DM 8,000. The DEB banned the guilty players and, eventually, deducted a large number of points from the two teams. At that stage the Kölner EC was already playing in the play-off quarter finals, which had to be repeated since the KEC was not qualified for them anymore after losing the points. Of the two new clubs, ESV Kaufbeuren qualified for the play-offs while EHC 70 München, successor to FC Bayern's ice hockey department, was relegated alongside the Duisburger SC. Apart from all this, the league also found itself in a row with the television broadcasters who refused to show games of teams with advertising on their shirts, with the clubs not backing down as they could not afford to lose the sponsorship money.

The 1981–82 season saw a recovery of the league after the scandal of the previous year and the introduction of the sudden-death format in the play-offs. SB Rosenheim turned out to be the surprise team of the season, finishing fifth after the regular season. The team managed to reach the final where they defeated the Mannheimer ERC and took home their first ever-championship. Of the new teams, ERC Freiburg, like two years before, could not keep up and was relegated while local rivals Schwenninger ERC came close to qualifying for the play-offs. On the negative side, both VfL Bad Nauheim and Berliner SC became insolvent and dropped out of the league.

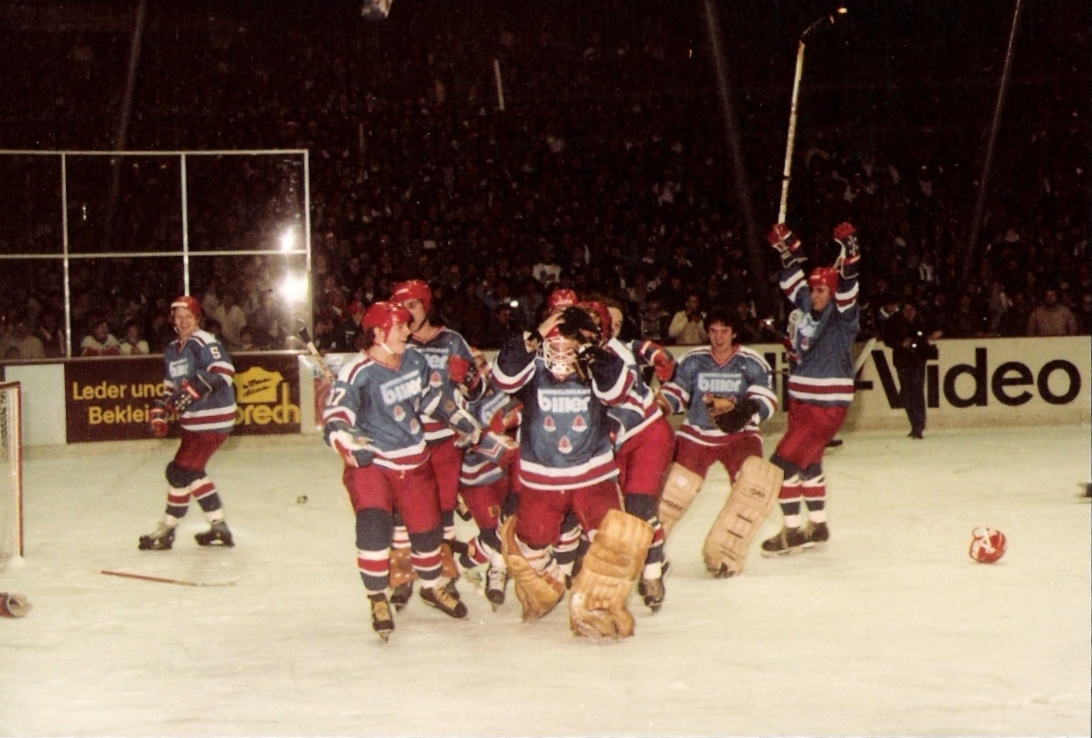
EV Landshut celebrating the 1982–83 championship

The league shrunk in size in 1982–83, now having only ten teams again. A double round of home-and-away games, 36 each, was followed by the play-offs contested by the top eight. The EV Landshut was the surprise champions, the second title for the club after 1970. On both occasions, it was due to its coach, the Czech Karel Gut. Landshut's championship team was low-cost, with the lowest budged in years for a championship winning side, achieved through the fact that 20 of its players were local boys who had been born in Landshut. Apart from them, only Erich Kühnhackl and the two Canadian Laycock brothers were not born in Landshut. Only one club was relegated that season, the EV Füssen, the second-last of the league's founding members that played in it uninterruptedly since day one. Füssen became insolvent at the end of the season, restarted in the 2nd Bundesliga but never returned to the top flight again.

In the 1983–84 season, the league once more made a slight modus change, introducing a round of two groups of four between the regular season and the play-offs and skipping the quarter-finals instead. The final was won by the Kölner EC, defeating champions Landshut in five games. No club was relegated because ERC Freiburg, finishing seventh, went broke and folded, to reform as EHC Freiburg in the 2nd Bundesliga.

In 1984–85 the league returned to the old system of a regular season of 36 games followed by the play-off quarter finals. The SB Rosenheim won its second title, again against the Mannheimer ERC. The EHC Essen-West was admitted to the league to replace the ERC Freiburg, but had to little time to prepare and was heavily outclassed, finishing the season in last place, with only eight points. The club was relegated and made room for the SV Bayreuth.

From 1985 onwards, the second golden era of the Kölner EC began, winning three titles in a row. In 1985–86, the final was contested against the arch rival Düsseldorfer EG, who had just overcome a couple of lean seasons in regards to success and money. The KEC defeated the DEG in three games in the best of three final, coached by Swede Hardy Nilsson, a former player. In the relegation zone, Bayreuth was another uncompetitive newcomer that found itself promptly relegated and replaced by Eintracht Frankfurt's ice hockey department, which returned to the Bundesliga after a long absence.

After struggling against relegation for four consecutive seasons, the SC Riessersee, last of the original eight from 1958 to never have dropped out of the league, finally fell. The club would not return to the Bundesliga again but at least made a brief top-level comeback in the DEL some years later. The Kölner EC again took out the championship and again needed only three games in the finals to do so, this time against Mannheim.

Ice hockey returned to Berlin in the form of BSC Preußen, successor to the Berliner SC, in 1987–88. The club was not competitive in the league but survived nevertheless because ECD Iserlohn folded midway. Iserlohn, formerly the EC Deilinghofen, was already under threat of folding before the season started but was allowed to participate anyway and made a desperate rescue attempt when chairman Heinz Weifenbach negotiated an advertising contract in which his club would advertise Muammar Gaddafi's Green Book on its shirts. After only one game, this was outlawed by the DEB and Iserlohn folded after the next. The Iserlohn affair also brought to the surface the tension between the clubs and the DEB, with some demanding an independent league, which would eventually materialise in 1994. On the ice, Kölner EC's third title was not won quite so easily, having to overcome SB Rosenheim in five games. Düsseldorfer and Mannheim also played out what was only the third scoreless game in league history that season.

The 1988–89 season was somewhat a transition, between the dominance of the Kölner EC's three consecutive titles and the Düsseldorfer EG's consecutive four that were to follow. In between, in that season, SB Rosenheim won its third and last national championship, after defeating the up-and-coming DEG in four matches in the finals. At the bottom of the league, Freiburg had returned, now as EHC instead of ERC, and survived the relegation round. ESV Kaufbueren was not so lucky and replaced by another up and coming club, the EC Hedos München.

The most successful era of the Düsseldorfer EG began with the 1989–90 season, with the club winning the regular season and then overcoming champions SB Rosenheim in five games in the finals. The two clubs that had to enter the relegation round with the best eight from the 2nd Bundesliga, EV Landshut and EHC Freiburg, both survived and consequently were able to play in the league for another season. The greatest change the league experienced however was a political one, the German reunion. Two clubs from the former East Germany would join the league in the following season.

=== The 1990s ===
From the 1990–91 season onwards, the Bundesliga became a league for all of Germany, including the lone two East German clubs EHC Dynamo Berlin and PEV Weißwasser, formerly Dynamo Weißwasser. Both clubs struggled in the new competition and found themselves in eleventh and twelfth place in the expanded league. A play-down format between the bottom four clubs was than used to determine the relegated teams, with the two East German sides competing against each other. Berlin was eventually relegated while Weißwasser was saved by the withdrawal of Eintracht Frankfurt from the league. In the top eight, the DEG reached the final again, this time against Cologne, which it defeated in five games.

The 1991–92 season saw the return of a former German champion, with the Krefelder EV having been promoted, alongside ESV Kaufbeuren. Krefeld qualified for the play-offs which saw Düsseldorf defeat Rosenheim in three games. With the third game, Rosenheim's Bundesliga era temporarily ended, the club withdrawing for financial reasons to the 2nd Bundesliga. Initially, this again would have saved relegated PEV Weißwasser, but the club was eventually refused a license and had to step down anyway. Weißwasser's misfortune saved Landshut who was initially relegated after losing to PEV in the play-downs.

An East German presence in the league was maintained with Dynamo Berlin having made an instant return to the league, followed by EC Ratingen, in the Bundesliga for the first time. While Ratingen qualified for the play-offs, Dynamo came last but saved itself in the play-downs. The two clubs from the Black Forest, Schwenninger ERC and EHC Freiburg had to face each other in the play-down final, which Schwenningen lost while Freiburg faced 2nd Bundesliga club Weißwasser for one more place in the league. Freiburg won but was refused a license, which was instead awarded to Schwenninger ERC. The play-offs saw Düsseldorfer EG and Kölner EC competing in the final once more, which was decided in a game five overtime win for Düsseldorf.

The 1993–94 season was to become the 36th and last of the Bundesliga, the DEL being formed shortly afterwards. The SB Rosenheim had returned to the league for its final season, which saw the Düsseldorfer EG reach the final for a sixth consecutive time. The other team, EC Hedos München, played in the final for the first time but disposed of the DEG in three games to win the championship and take the title to Munich for the first time since 1922. Because of the DEL, relegation turned out to be irrelevant, with EC Ratingen nominally relegated while Schwenninger ERC held the league against EC Kassel. Augsburger EV would have been directly promoted, after a long absence.

=== Aftermath ===
The 1994–95 season saw all twelve Bundesliga clubs from 1993 to 1994 compete in the DEL, with defending champions EC Hedos München folding halfway through. Apart from the twelve, six 2nd Bundesliga teams were also admitted to the league, the Augsburger EV, ESC Frankfurt, EC Hannover, EC Kassel, EHC 80 Nürnberg and ES Weißwasser. The 2nd Bundesliga, like the Bundesliga, was disbanded. Behind the formation of the DEL stood the financial risk clubs were taking to survive in the Bundesliga, as a drop inevitably meant a massive financial loss. It was decided that this could only be addressed by forming a league like the National Hockey League where clubs were safe from relegation and therefore financially more stable.

In the 1998–99 season, a national league was reintroduced by the DEB which carried the name Bundesliga for a season. The following year, the DEL reached an agreement with the DEB, allowing the former to use the name Bundesliga while the DEB league was branded the 2nd Bundesliga.

== Bundesliga champions ==
The league champions, championship winning coaches and top scorers from the establishment of the league in 1958–59 to its disbanding in 1994:

=== Pre play-off era ===
The statistics from 1958 to 1980:

Season	Champions	Coach	Top scorers	Top goal scorers
1958-59	EV Füssen	Markus Egen		Horst Schuldes
1959-60	SC Riessersee	Ronny Barr		Lorenz Fries
1960-61	EV Füssen	Markus Egen		Ernst Trautwein
1961-62	EC Bad Tölz	Hans Rampf		Sepp Reif
1962-63	EV Füssen	Markus Egen		Georg Scholz
1963-64	EV Füssen	Markus Egen		Peter Rhode
1964-65	EV Füssen	Markus Egen		Rudi Pittrich
1965-66	EC Bad Tölz	Mike Daski		Horst Phillip Manfred Hübner Siegfried Schubert
1966-67	Düsseldorfer EG	Hans Rampf		Horst Ludwig
1967-68	EV Füssen	Vladimir Bouzek		Lorenz Funk
1968-69	EV Füssen	Vladimir Bouzek		Ernst Köpf
1969-70	EV Landshut	Karel Gut		Bernd Kuhn
1970-71	EV Füssen	Siegfried Schubert		Bernd Kuhn
1971-72	Düsseldorfer EG	Xaver Unsinn		Bernd Kuhn Horst Phillip Alois Schloder
1972-73	EV Füssen	Markus Egen	Erich Kühnhackl	Bernd Kuhn
1973-74	Berliner Schlittschuhclub	Xaver Unsinn	Erich Kühnhackl	Erich Kühnhackl
1974-75	Düsseldorfer EG	Chuck Holdaway	Dick Decloe	Dick Decloe
1975-76	Berliner Schlittschuhclub	Xaver Unsinn	Ernst Köpf	Dick Decloe
1976-77	Kölner EC	Gerhard Kießling	Dick Decloe	Dick Decloe
1977-78	SC Riessersee	Jozef Golonka	Erich Kühnhackl	Dick Decloe
1978-79	Kölner EC	Gerhard Kießling	Erich Kühnhackl	Martin Hinerstocker
1979-80	Mannheimer ERC	Heinz Weisenbach	Erich Kühnhackl	Erich Kühnhackl

=== Play-off era ===
The statistics from 1981 to 1994:

Season	Champions	Coach	Top scorers	Top goal scorers	Regular season winner
1980-81	SC Riessersee	Jano Starsi	Dick Decloe	Dieter Hegen	SC Riessersee
1981-82	SB Rosenheim	Jano Starsi	Erich Kühnhackl	Bill Lochead	EV Landshut
1982-83	EV Landshut	Karel Gut	Erich Kühnhackl	Gordie Clark	EV Landshut
1983-84	Kölner EC	Jozef Golonka	Erich Kühnhackl	Helmut Steiger	EV Landshut Kölner EC
1984-85	SB Rosenheim	Pavel Wohl	Ernst Höfner	Ross Yates	SB Rosenheim
1985-86	Kölner EC	Hardy Nilsson	Chris Valentine	Miro Sikora	Kölner EC
1986-87	Kölner EC	Hardy Nilsson	Chris Valentine	Paul Messier	SB Rosenheim
1987-88	Kölner EC	Hardy Nilsson	Chris Valentine	Peter John Lee	SB Rosenheim
1988-89	SB Rosenheim	Jano Starsi			Kölner EC
1989-90	Düsseldorfer EG	Peter Johansson Petr Hejma			Düsseldorfer EG
1990-91	Düsseldorfer EG	Hans Zach			Kölner EC
1991-92	Düsseldorfer EG	Hans Zach			Düsseldorfer EG
1992-93	Düsseldorfer EG	Hans Zach			Düsseldorfer EG
1993-94	EC Hedos München	Hardy Nilsson			Düsseldorfer EG

- The Bundesliga initially did not keep scorer charts in the Canadian style of goals and assists added up but instead counted goals only. With the introduction of the play-offs in 1981, the scorer charts became the most important measure of who was the best player while the goal scorer count was pushed into the background.

== List of clubs ==
This is a complete list of clubs in the Bundesliga, sorted by the last season a club played in the league. Of these clubs the EV Landshut has played the longest in the league, having entered the Bundesliga in 1963–64 and never been relegated again, competing in 31 of 36 possible seasons:

Club	No	First	Last	Titles	Seasons	Current
Düsseldorfer EG	30	1958–59	1993–94	7	1966–67, 1971–72, 1974–75, 1989–90, 1990–91, 1991–92, 1992–93	Deutsche Eishockey Liga
EC Hedos München	5	1989–90	1993–94	1	1993–94	Defunct
Krefelder EV	23	1958–59	1993–94	—	—	Deutsche Eishockey Liga
EV Landshut	31	1963–64	1993–94	2	1969–70, 1982–83	2nd Bundesliga
Kölner EC	23	1973–74	1993–94	6	1976–77, 1978–79, 1983–84, 1985–86, 1986–87, 1987–88	Deutsche Eishockey Liga
BSC Preussen	7	1987–88	1993–94	—	—	Defunct
Mannheimer ERC	29	1958–59	1993–94	1	1979–80	Deutsche Eishockey Liga
ESV Kaufbeuren	25	1959–60	1993–94	—	—	2nd Bundesliga
SB Rosenheim	15	1978–79	1993–94	3	1981–82, 1984–85, 1988–89	2nd Bundesliga
Schwenninger ERC	14	1981–82	1993–94	—	—	2nd Bundesliga
EHC Dynamo Berlin	3	1990–91	1993–94	—	—	Deutsche Eishockey Liga
EC Ratingen	2	1992–93	1993–94	—	—	Defunct
EHC Freiburg	5	1988–89	1992–93	—	—	Defunct
ES Weißwasser	2	1990–91	1991–92	—	—	2nd Bundesliga
Eintracht Frankfurt	7	1968–69	1990–91	—	—	Defunct
ECD Iserlohn	8	1977–78	1987–88	—	—	Deutsche Eishockey Liga
SC Riessersee	28	1958–59	1986–87	3	1959–60, 1977–78, 1980–81	2nd Bundesliga
SV Bayreuth	1	1985–86	1985–86	—	—	Defunct
EHC Essen-West	1	1984–85	1984–85	—	—	Oberliga
ERC Freiburg	3	1979–80	1983–84	—	—	Defunct
EV Füssen	25	1958–59	1982–83	9	1958–59, 1960–61, 1962–63, 1963–64, 1964–65, 1967–68, 1968–69, 1970–71, 1972–73	Oberliga
Berliner SC	11	1966–67	1981–82	2	1973–74, 1975–76	Defunct
VfL Bad Nauheim	18	1959–60	1981–82	—	—	Oberliga
EHC 70 München	1	1980–81	1980–81	—	—	Defunct
Duisburger SC	2	1979–80	1980–81	—	—	Oberliga
Augsburger EV	8	1968–69	1978–79	—	—	Deutsche Eishockey Liga
EV Rosenheim	4	1972–73	1977–78	—	—	Defunct
EC Bad Tölz	18	1958–59	1975–76	2	1961–62, 1965–66	Oberliga
Kölner EK	1	1969–70	1969–70	—	—	Defunct
Preußen Krefeld	10	1958–59	1968–69	—	—	Defunct
FC Bayern Munich	2	1967–68	1968–69	—	—	Defunct
SG Oberstdorf/Sonthofen	1	1967–68	1967–68	—	—	Defunct
TSC Eintracht Dortmund	4	1960–61	1964–65	—	—	Oberliga
SC Weßling/Starnberg	1	1958–59	1958–59	—	—	Defunct

=== Key ===
Club	Name of club
No	Number of seasons in league
First	First season in league
Last	Last season in league
Titles	Number of Bundesliga titles won
Seasons	Seasons Bundesliga titles were won in
Current	League the club plays in 2011–12
