= 1971–72 ice hockey Bundesliga season =

German ice hockey season

The 1971–72 Ice hockey Bundesliga season was the 14th season of the Ice hockey Bundesliga, the top level of ice hockey in Germany. Nine teams participated in the league, and Düsseldorfer EG won the championship.

== Regular season ==
	Club	GP	W	T	L	GF–GA	Pts
1.	Düsseldorfer EG	32	23	2	7	147: 75	48:16
2.	EV Füssen	32	21	2	9	136: 97	44:20
3.	SC Riessersee	32	20	1	11	148:107	41:23
4.	EC Bad Tölz	32	17	4	11	117:106	38:26
5.	EV Landshut	32	16	3	13	166:142	35:29
6.	Augsburger EV	32	13	2	17	119:125	23:41
7.	VfL Bad Nauheim	32	11	1	20	124:155	23:41
8.	ESV Kaufbeuren	32	8	2	22	102:160	18:46
9.	Krefelder EV	32	6	1	25	93:183	13:51
	Preußen Krefeld	Did not play					
