= Kühnhackl =

Kühnhackl is a German surname. Notable people with the surname include:

- Erich Kühnhackl (born 1950), German ice hockey player
- Tom Kühnhackl (born 1992), German ice hockey player, son of Erich
