= 1958–59 ice hockey Bundesliga season =

German ice hockey season

The 1958–59 Ice hockey Bundesliga season was the first season of the Ice hockey Bundesliga, the top level of ice hockey in Germany. Eight teams participated in the league, and EV Fussen won the championship.

== Regular season ==
	Club	GP	W	T	L	GF–GA	Pts
1.	EV Füssen (M)	14	12	2	0	107:31	26:2
2.	EC Bad Tölz	14	10	0	4	89:50	20:8
3.	Mannheimer ERC	14	9	0	5	62:49	18:10
4.	SC Riessersee	14	7	2	5	89:43	16:12
5.	Preußen Krefeld	14	7	1	6	73:75	15:13
6.	Krefelder EV	14	5	1	8	62:59	11:17
7.	Düsseldorfer EG	14	2	0	12	42:124	4:24
8.	SC Weßling	14	1	0	13	34:117	2:26
