= Kevin Gaudet =

- Born: October 22, 1963 (age 62) Moncton, New Brunswick, Canada
- Height: 5 ft 9 in (175 cm)
- Weight: 179 lb (81 kg; 12 st 11 lb)
- Position: Center
- Shot: Left
- Played for: Université de Moncton; Moncton Hawks; HC Val Vanoise; ESC Wedemark
- Current coach: Hannover Scorpions
- Coached for: ESC Wedemark; Hannover Scorpions; Straubing Tigers; Vienna Capitals; Bietigheim Steelers; Nürnberg Ice Tigers; Tölzer Löwen; Hannover Scorpions
- NHL draft: Undrafted
- Playing career: 1986–1995
- Coaching career: 1991–present

Kevin Gaudet (born October 22, 1963) is a Canadian former professional ice hockey player, now working as a coach. He is currently serving as head coach of the Hannover Scorpions.

== Playing career ==
Gaudet attended the Université de Moncton and helped "Les Aigles Bleus" win back-to-back Canadian Interuniversity Athletics Union Men's Ice Hockey championships in 1981 and 1982. The championship-winning teams were inducted into the New Brunswick Sports Hall of Fame in 2004.

He spent some time with the Moncton Hawks of the American Hockey League and was trying out with NHL sides Edmonton Oilers and Minnesota North Stars, before making the move to France, where he played for HC Val Vanoise between 1985 and 1991.

In 1991, Gaudet signed with ESC Wedemark of Germany, serving as player/coach. He led the team to the Oberliga championship and to promotion to the 1. Liga in 1994. Gaudet brought an end to his playing career in 1995 and focussed on coaching at ESC Wedemark after retiring as a player.

== Coaching career ==
Under Gaudet's tutelage, ESC Wedemark captured the 1.Liga title in his first season as full-time head coach and earned a spot in the German top flight Deutsche Eishockey Liga for the following campaign. His first stint with the organization that changed its name to Hannover Scorpions in 1997, ended in January 2000. However, Gaudet returned to the Hannover bench at the beginning of the 2000-01 campaign, but was relieved of his duties midway through the season in January 2001.

In December 2001, he was named head coach of EHC Straubing of Germany's second division and remained at the job until November 2004. He left Straubing to accept an offer to come back to Hannover for a third stint. Gaudet led the Scorpions to the DEL playoff semifinals in 2005-06 and parted company with the club at the end of the season.

From 2007 to 2011, Gaudet served as head coach of Austrian top-tier club Vienna Capitals.

In November 2011, he assumed head coaching duties with the Bietigheim Steelers who lifted silverware in Gaudet’s first season, capturing the 2011-12 DEB cup competition. In 2012-13, the Bietigheim team won the double of DEB-Pokal and 2. Bundesliga championship and took home the DEL2 title in 2015. Gaudet received 2. Bundesliga Coach of the Year honors in 2013 and DEL2 Coach of the Year distinction in 2015. In the 2017-18 season, he guided Bietigheim to a third championship title.

In May 2018, Gaudet took over the head coaching job at German DEL side Nürnberg Ice Tigers, but in September 2018 parted company with the team only four games into the season due to “different views on tactical and leaderships aspects". In May 2019, he was named head coach of German DEL2 side EC Bad Tölz. He and his team suffered relegation from the DEL 2 in 2022. Gaudet and EC Bad Tölz parted ways on April 14, 2022.

On April 26, 2022, Gaudet returned to the Hannover Scorpions for another stint as head coach.
