= Siegfried Schubert =

German ice hockey player

Personal information
- Nationality: German
- Born: 4 October 1939 (age 85); Hindenburg, Nazi Germany (currently Zabrze, Poland)

Sport
- Sport: Ice hockey

Siegfried Schubert (born 4 October 1939) is a German ice hockey player. He competed in the men's tournaments at the 1960 Winter Olympics and the 1964 Winter Olympics.
