= Ernst Trautwein =

German ice hockey player

Personal information
- Nationality: German
- Born: 8 April 1936 (age 90) Füssen, Germany

Sport
- Sport: Ice hockey

Ernst Trautwein (born 8 April 1936) is a German ice hockey player. He competed in the men's tournaments at the 1956 Winter Olympics, the 1960 Winter Olympics and the 1964 Winter Olympics.
