= ERC Freiburg =

Defunct European elite ice hockey team

- Sport: Ice hockey
- Founded: 1979
- Folded: 1983
- League: Eishockey-Bundesliga (1979–1984); 2nd Bundesliga (1980–1983)
- Location: Freiburg, Germany

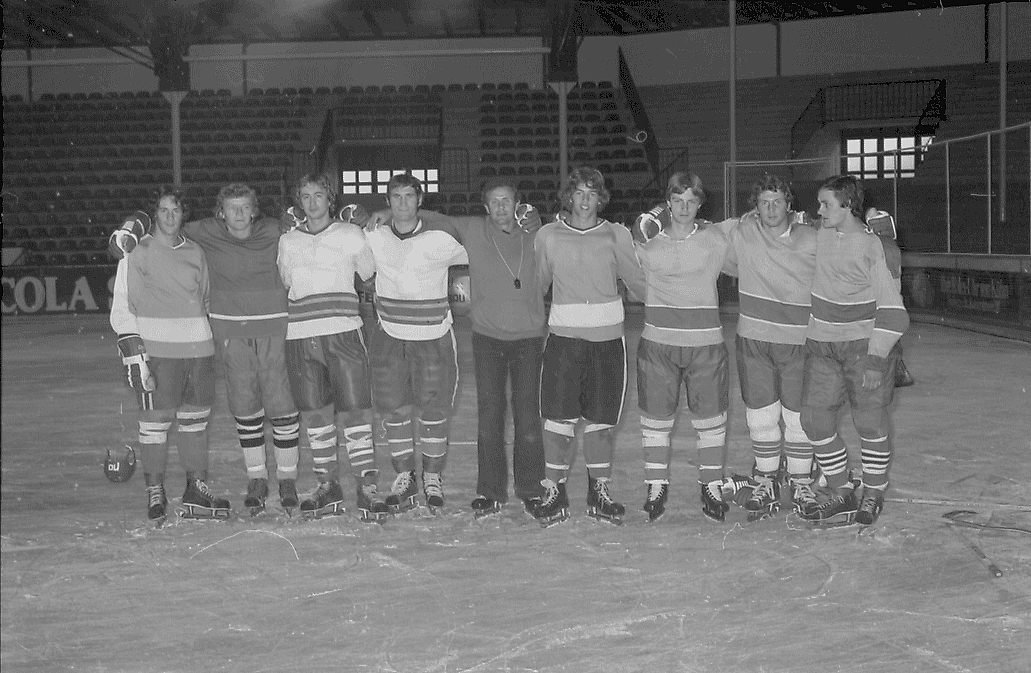
Freiburg ERC

ERC Freiburg is a defunct European elite ice hockey team that was based in Freiburg, Germany. They played in the German top-tier Eishockey-Bundesliga from 1979 to 1984 (relegated to the 2nd tier 2nd Bundesliga from 1980 to 1983).
