= Heinz Weisenbach =

German ice hockey player

Personal information
- Nationality: German
- Born: 30 August 1945; Füssen, Germany
- Died: 9 December 2018 (aged 73); Füssen, Germany

Sport
- Sport: Ice hockey

Heinz Weisenbach (30 August 1945 - 9 December 2018) was a German ice hockey player and coach. He competed in the men's tournament at the 1968 Winter Olympics.
