= 1984–85 ice hockey Bundesliga season =

German ice hockey season

The 1984–85 Ice hockey Bundesliga season was the 27th season of the Bundesliga, the top level of ice hockey in Germany. 10 teams participated in the league, and SB Rosenheim won the championship.

== First round ==
	Club	GP	W	T	L	GF–GA	Pts
1.	SB Rosenheim	36	23	7	6	211:109	53:19
2.	Kölner EC (M)	36	23	5	8	194: 99	51:21
3.	Mannheimer ERC	36	22	2	12	199:126	46:26
4.	EV Landshut	36	18	5	13	165:137	41:31
5.	ESV Kaufbeuren	36	18	3	15	164:173	39:33
6.	Schwenninger ERC	36	17	3	16	124:133	37:35
7.	Düsseldorfer EG	36	16	5	15	159:142	37:35
8.	ECD Iserlohn	36	12	4	20	133:168	28:44
9.	SC Riessersee	36	8	4	24	107:200	20:52
10.	EHC Essen-West (N)	36	3	2	31	97:266	8:64

== Relegation round ==
	Club	GP	W	T	L	GF–GA	Pts
1.	SC Riessersee	18	12	4	2	98:63	28:8
2.	SV Bayreuth	18	11	5	2	98:61	27:9
3.	BSC Preussen	18	10	4	4	86:56	24:12
4.	EHC Essen-West	18	9	2	7	96:71	20:16
5.	Krefelder EV	18	8	2	8	95:85	18:18
6.	Duisburger SC	18	7	4	7	72:89	18:18
7.	Eintracht Frankfurt	18	9	0	9	68:90	18:18
8.	Augsburger EV	18	6	1	11	74:73	13:23
9.	EV Füssen	18	3	2	13	81:115	8:28
10.	EC Bad Tölz	18	2	2	14	47:112	6:30

== Playoffs ==
=== Quarterfinals ===
			Series	1	2	3	4	5
SB Rosenheim	–	ECD Iserlohn	3:0	6:2	6:2	10:5	–	–
Kölner EC	–	Düsseldorfer EG	3:1	3:1	0:2	5:4 OT	4:0	–
EV Landshut	–	ESV Kaufbeuren	1:3	4:3	1:4	5:8	2:4	–
Mannheimer ERC	–	Schwenninger ERC	3:0	9:1	3:2	3:2	–	–

=== Semifinals ===
			Series	1	2	3	4	5
SB Rosenheim	–	ESV Kaufbeuren	3:0	8:1	3:2	4:1	–	–
Kölner EC	–	Mannheimer ERC	0:3	3:4	3:5	3:7	–	–

=== 3rd place ===
			Series	1	2
ESV Kaufbeuren	–	Kölner EC	4:14	2:4	2:10

=== Final ===
			Series	1	2	3	4	5
SB Rosenheim	–	Mannheimer ERC	3:0	4:3	7:2	2:1 OT	–	–
