= 1981–82 ice hockey Bundesliga season =

German ice hockey season

The 1981–82 Ice hockey Bundesliga season was the 24th season of the Ice hockey Bundesliga, the top level of ice hockey in Germany. 12 teams participated in the league, and SB Rosenheim won the championship.

== First round ==
	Club	Gp	W	T	L	GF–GA	Pts
1.	EV Landshut	44	33	3	8	264:143	69:19
2.	Kölner EC	44	30	7	7	248:134	67:21
3.	Mannheimer ERC	44	28	6	10	220:121	62:26
4.	SC Riessersee (M)	44	22	6	16	180:137	50:38
5.	SB Rosenheim	44	19	6	19	173:165	44:44
6.	ESV Kaufbeuren	44	16	8	20	190:225	40:48
7.	Berliner SC	44	17	6	21	142:176	40:48
8.	Düsseldorfer EG	44	17	3	24	197:198	37:51
9.	Schwenninger ERC (N)	44	15	5	24	170:222	35:53
10.	EV Füssen	44	14	7	23	174:222	35:53
11.	VfL Bad Nauheim	44	12	4	28	176:257	28:60
12.	ERC Freiburg (N)	44	9	3	32	149:283	21:67

== Relegation round ==
	Club	Gp	W	T	L	GF–GA	Pts
1.	EV Füssen	10	8	0	2	60:37	16:4
2.	Schwenninger ERC	10	7	1	2	56:33	15:5
3.	Duisburger SC	10	4	1	5	59:61	9:11
4.	ECD Iserlohn	10	3	2	5	42:49	8:12
5.	Deggendorfer SC	10	3	1	6	37:65	7:13
6.	EHC Essen-West	10	2	1	7	43:52	5:15

== Playoffs ==
=== Quarterfinals ===
			Series	1	2	3
EV Landshut	–	Düsseldorfer EG	2:0	6:2	5:2	–
Kölner EC	–	Berliner SC	2:0	12:5	5:0	–
Mannheimer ERC	–	ESV Kaufbeuren	2:1	6:3	4:7	3:1
SC Riessersee	–	SB Rosenheim	0:2	3:4	1:2 OT	–

=== Semifinals ===
			Series	1	2	3
EV Landshut	–	SB Rosenheim	1:2	0:5	6:3	3:4
Kölner EC	–	Mannheimer ERC	1:2	6:3	2:4	1:3

=== 3rd place ===
			Series	1	2	3
EV Landshut	–	Kölner EC	1:2	4:7	8:6	2:7

=== Final ===
			Series	1	2	3
Mannheimer ERC	–	SB Rosenheim	0:2	2:6	0:4	–
