= 1988–89 ice hockey Bundesliga season =

German ice hockey season

The 1988–89 Ice hockey Bundesliga season was the 31st season of the Ice hockey Bundesliga, the top level of ice hockey in West Germany. Ten teams participated in the league, and SB Rosenheim won the championship.

== First round ==
	Club	GP	W	T	L	GF–GA	Pts
1.	Kölner EC (M)	36	24	6	6	179:108	54:18
2.	SB Rosenheim	36	19	9	8	152: 98	47:25
3.	Mannheimer ERC	36	17	7	12	137:130	41:31
4.	Düsseldorfer EG	36	16	7	13	170:151	39:33
5.	Schwenninger ERC	36	17	5	14	150:157	39:33
6.	BSC Preussen	36	15	7	14	144:136	37:35
7.	Eintracht Frankfurt	36	13	10	13	149:137	36:36
8.	EV Landshut	36	13	7	16	144:156	33:39
9.	EHC Freiburg (N)	36	8	4	24	108:166	20:52
10.	ESV Kaufbeuren	36	5	4	27	100:194	14:58

== Relegation round ==
	Club	GP	W	T	L	GF–GA	Pts
1.	EHC Freiburg	18	15	1	2	107:43	31: 5
2.	EC Hedos München	18	11	2	5	108:80	24:12
3.	SV Bayreuth	18	11	1	6	70: 6	23:13
4.	ESV Kaufbeuren	18	11	0	7	78:69	22:14
5.	EC Bad Nauheim	18	9	3	6	90:67	21:15
6.	Krefelder EV	18	9	1	8	89:93	19:17
7.	ESC Wolfsburg	18	5	3	10	88:112	13:23
8.	EHC 80 Nürnberg	18	4	2	12	69:110	10:26
9.	EHC Essen-West	18	2	5	11	73:101	9:27
10.	Heilbronner EC	18	3	2	13	67:108	8:28

== Playoffs ==
=== Quarterfinals ===
			Series	1	2	3	4	5
Kölner EC	–	EV Landshut	3:0	8:2	4:2	5:3	–	–
SB Rosenheim	–	Eintracht Frankfurt	3:1	8:2	3:2	4:6	9:2	–
Mannheimer ERC	–	BSC Preussen	3:1	3:4	3:2	5:2	4:0	–
Düsseldorfer EG	–	Schwenninger ERC	3:0	5:2	5:4 OT	6:2	–	–

=== Semifinals ===
			Series	1	2	3	4	5
Kölner EC	–	Düsseldorfer EG	1:3	3:2	2:5	1:7	3:4	–
SB Rosenheim	–	Mannheimer ERC	3:0	7:3	4:1	4:3 OT	–	–

=== 3rd place ===
			Series	1	2
Mannheimer ERC	–	Kölner EC	7:10	2:5	5:5

=== Final ===
			Series	1	2	3	4	5
SB Rosenheim	–	Düsseldorfer EG	3:1	7:1	2:4	5:0	4:2	–
