= 2nd Bundesliga (ice hockey) =

Second tier of Ice hockey in Germany

- Sport: Ice hockey
- Founded: 1973
- Folded: 2013
- No. of teams: 13
- Country: Germany
- Last champion: Bietigheim Steelers
- Promotion to: DEL; Eishockey-Bundesliga
- Relegation to: Oberliga
- Related competitions: DEL; DEL2; Oberliga; Regionalliga
- Website: Official ESBG website

The 2nd Eishockey-Bundesliga was the second tier of Ice hockey in Germany until 2012/13 and has since been replaced by DEL2. Starting in 2002, the league was organized by the ESBG (de:Eishockeyspielbetriebsgesellschaft mbH), to which the league organization was outsourced from the DEB, the German ice hockey federation. In the 2012–13 season, it featured 13 teams.

== History of the 2nd Ice Hockey Bundesliga ==
The league was first introduced in the 1973–74 season as the second tier of German ice hockey, the level below the Ice hockey Bundesliga.

=== History up until 1994 ===
- From 1973–74 to 1980–81 the league operated as the single-conference 2nd Bundesliga
- In the 1981–82 season, it was divided into two conferences: 2nd Bundesliga Süd (southern division) and 2nd Bundesliga Nord (northern division)
- For the 1982–83 season, it returned to a single-conference league due to a lack of clubs interested in playing in the league
- Starting from the 1983–84 season until 1991–92, it was divided into the 2nd Bundesliga Süd and Nord again, with the top four clubs from each league meeting the bottom two Bundesliga clubs for a promotion round for two places in the Bundesliga
- In the seasons 1992–93 and 1993–94, the league operated as one single division again

=== From 1994 ===
The large number of insolvencies of second division clubs in 1994 was the reason for the abolition of the 2nd Bundesliga and the introduction of the Deutsche Eishockey Liga with 18 teams, without promotion and relegation. A number of top clubs from the second division were admitted to the DEL.

Below the former 2nd Bundesliga, the Oberliga now became the highest league still under control of the DEB. The Oberliga was however renamed 1st Liga for the next couple of seasons, until returning to its old name.

=== From 1998 ===
As the highest single-division for the DEB, a new league was formed in 1998, receiving the name "Bundesliga". The decision to name the new league "Bundesliga" led to conflicts between the Deutschen Eishockey-Bund and the Deutsche Eishockey Liga, since the DEL was of the opinion that it owned the right to call itself Bundesliga, being the highest league in the country. For this reason, the DEL logo also carries the name 1st Bundesliga in smaller letters below. Eventually, a compromise was reached, naming the new league 2nd Bundesliga instead.

=== From 1999 ===
Since 1999, the league became the 2nd Bundesliga again, which is organized today by the Eishockeyspielbetriebsgesellschaft (ESBG). As in the DEL, the clubs must undergo a strict financial examination.

Despite this fact, some clubs still found themselves in financial difficulties throughout the season and had to withdraw, like the EC Bad Nauheim in the past. The Moskitos Essen and Eisbären Regensburg both declared insolvency on 15 April 2008, being unable to meet their debts. Both clubs were immediately relegated from the 2nd Bundesliga. Due to the structure of the 2nd Bundesliga, where all teams playing are separate companies operated by the mother club, the insolvency of one of those does not mean the club itself becomes insolvent.

In the 2008–09 season, the Tölzer Löwen had to declare insolvency and, despite coming second in the league, were relegated. Because the Füchse Duisburg had to return their DEL licence, the champion of the 2nd Bundesliga has the option of promotion to the DEL this season.

== Promotion and relegation ==
In November 2007, the DEL has introduced promotion to the league once more. The teams placed 15th and 16th in the DEL will play a best-of-seven series to determine which club faces the 2nd Bundesliga champion for a place in the league. There is however an ongoing dispute about those games as second division clubs can only have five foreign players on contract and therefore face a handicap in comparison to the DEL clubs with currently twelve. For now, the ESBG has declared that no club from the 2nd Bundesliga would take part in these matches and therefore no promotion/relegation with the DEL will take place.

The two bottom teams in the 2nd Bundesliga are relegated to the Oberliga and the top-two Oberliga teams promoted to this league.

== League champions ==
Season	Champion
1973–74	ESV Kaufbeuren ^{*}
1974–75	EV Rosenheim ^{*}
1975–76	Augsburger EV ^{*}
1976–77	ESV Kaufbeuren
1977–78	Augsburger EV ^{*}
1978–79	Duisburger SC ^{*}
1979–80	ESV Kaufbeuren ^{*}
1980–81	ERC Freiburg ^{*}

- ^{*} The Team promoted into the Eishockey-Bundesliga

Season	South	North	Championship Round
1981–82	EHC 70 München	Duisburger SC	EHC Essen

Season	Regular season	Promotion Round
1982–83	ERC Freiburg	ERC Freiburg ^{*}

- ^{*} The Team promoted into the Eishockey-Bundesliga

Season	South	North	Relegationround Eishockey-Bundesliga
1983–84	SV Bayreuth	Preussen Berlin	ECD Iserlohn ^{1}
1984–85	SV Bayreuth	Preussen Berlin	SC Riessersee ^{1}
1985–86	Augsburger EV	Preussen Berlin	Eintracht Frankfurt ^{1}
1986–87	EHC Freiburg	Preussen Berlin	Preussen Berlin ^{*}
1987–88	EHC Freiburg	Krefelder EV	Preussen Berlin ^{1}
1988–89	SV Bayreuth	Krefelder EV	EHC Freiburg ^{1}
1989–90	SV Bayreuth	ECD Sauerland	EV Landshut ^{1}
1990–91	EHC Nürnberg	ECD Sauerland	ESV Kaufbeuren ^{*}
1991–92	Augsburger EV	EC Kassel	Dynamo Berlin ^{*}

- ^{1} denotes Bundesliga club taking part in the promotion round
- ^{*} denotes Team promoted into the Eishockey-Bundesliga

Season	Regular season	Play-Offs
1992–93	Augsburger EV	SB Rosenheim ^{*}
1993–94	Augsburger EV	Augsburger EV ^{*}
1994–95 to 1997–98 – league did not exist
1998–99	ESC Moskitos Essen	ESC Moskitos Essen ^{*}
1999–2000	Düsseldorfer EG	Düsseldorfer EG ^{*}
2000–01	ERC Ingolstadt	ERC Ingolstadt
2001–02	ERC Ingolstadt	REV Bremerhaven
2002–03	SC Bietigheim-Bissingen	EHC Freiburg
2003–04	EHC Wolfsburg	EHC Wolfsburg
2004–05	EHC Straubing	EV Duisburg
2005–06	REV Bremerhaven	EHC Straubing
2006–07	Kassel Huskies	EHC Wolfsburg
2007–08	Kassel Huskies	Kassel Huskies
2008–09	SC Bietigheim-Bissingen	SC Bietigheim-Bissingen
2009–10	SERC Wild Wings	EHC München
2010–11	Ravensburg Towerstars	Ravensburg Towerstars
2011–12	Landshut Cannibals	Landshut Cannibals
2012–13	Bietigheim Steelers	Bietigheim Steelers

== 2nd Bundesliga standings ==
Club	1999	2000	2001	2002	2003	2004	2005	2006	2007	2008	2009	2010	2011	2012	2013
Düsseldorfer EG	3	1	DEL	DEL	DEL	DEL	DEL	DEL	DEL	DEL	DEL	DEL	DEL	DEL	DEL
Iserlohn Roosters; Iserlohner EC	6	6	DEL	DEL	DEL	DEL	DEL	DEL	DEL	DEL	DEL	DEL	DEL	DEL	DEL
Ingolstadt Panther; ERC Ingolstadt	13	2	1	1	DEL	DEL	DEL	DEL	DEL	DEL	DEL	DEL	DEL	DEL	DEL
Straubing Tigers; EHC Straubing			10	9	8	3	1	5	DEL	DEL	DEL	DEL	DEL	DEL	DEL
Grizzly Adams Wolfsburg; EHC Wolfsburg				6	7	1	DEL^{4}	8	2	DEL	DEL	DEL	DEL	DEL	DEL
EHC München								11	6	9	2	2	DEL	DEL	DEL
Bietigheim Steelers; SC Bietigheim-Bissingen		8	4	3	1	6	8	3	9	7	1	4	10	11	1
Schwenninger Wild Wings; Schwenninger ERC	DEL	DEL	DEL	DEL	DEL^{2}	8	4	6	4	4	8	1	4	3	2
EV Landshut; Landshut Cannibals	DEL	DEL^{5}				4	4	6	2	5	2	5	8	1	3
Ravensburg Towerstars; EV Ravensburg										11	4	3	1	7	4
Fischtown Pinguins; REV Bremerhaven			5	2	12		5	1	3	12	9	11	3	9	5
SB Rosenheim; Starbulls Rosenheim	DEL	DEL	DEL	DEL	DEL	DEL^{5}							7	4	6
Heilbronner Falken; Heilbronner EC	10	9	2	4	5	9^{1}				3	3	6	2	2	7
Lausitzer Füchse; ES Weisswasser	15	12	9	8	14		7	13	13	13	6	8	13	6	8
Eispiraten Crimmitschau; ETC Crimmitschau				5	15	10	11		12	8	12	12	12	10	9
Dresdner Eislöwen; ESC Dresden								7	11		11	9	6	13	10
Hannover Indians; EC Hannover Indians												13	9	8	11^{1}
ESV Kaufbeuren					13	11	13	9	14			10	5	5	12
SC Riessersee	8	11	6^{6}	13	3	14				5	10	7 ^{2}		12	13
Freiburger Wölfe; EHC Freiburg	5	3	8	10	6	DEL	9	10^{1}			7	14	11^{1}		
Kassel Huskies; EJ Kassel	DEL	DEL	DEL	DEL	DEL	DEL	DEL	DEL	1	1	DEL	DEL^{4}			
Duisburg Füchse; EV Duisburg				14	9	5	2	DEL	DEL	DEL	DEL^{1}				
Tölzer Löwen	9	4	3	7	11^{6}	12	12	12			13 ^{1}				
Moskitos Essen; ESC Moskitos Essen	1	DEL	DEL	DEL^{1}			10	14	8	6 ^{2}					
Eisbären Regensburg; EV Regensburg				12	10	7	3	4	7	10 ^{2}					
EV Landsberg									10	14					
1. EV Weiden						13	14								
Rote Teufel Bad Nauheim	2	5	11	11	2	2 ^{2}									
EC Wilhelmshaven		10	7 ^{2}												
Erding Jets; TSV 1862 Erding	11		12												
Hamburg Crocodiles; FTV Hamburg	14	7 ^{3}													
EHC Harz-Braunlage	7	13													
Grefrather EV	16	14													
EHC Neuwied	12	15^{7}													
GEC Nordhorn	4	16^{7}													

Colour	Result
Gold	Champion
Silver	Finalist
Green	Semi finalist
Blue	Quarter finalist
Purple	Preliminary round
White	not qualified for play-offs
DEL	denotes club played in the Deutsche Eishockey Liga (I)

- ^{1} The team finished the regular season but due to having to declare insolvency they were relegated to the last place in the standings.
- ^{2} Team withdrew from the league because of financial reasons.
- ^{3} The Hamburg Crocodiles withdrew to the Oberliga after the 1999–2000 season.
- ^{4} The team was outclosed from the league.
- ^{5} The team leaves the league, when the licence was sold by the owner.
- ^{6} The team declared insolvency but finished the insolvency before the next season.
- ^{7} The club, which organized the team, collapsed for financial reasons.

== See also ==
- Deutsche Eishockey Liga, the DEL
- Ice hockey Bundesliga
- DEL2
- Oberliga
- Regionalliga
- Bavarian ice hockey leagues
