= 1979–80 ice hockey Bundesliga season =

German ice hockey season

The 1979–80 Ice hockey Bundesliga season was the 22nd season of the Ice hockey Bundesliga, the top level of ice hockey in Germany. 12 teams participated in the league, and Mannheimer ERC won the championship.

== First round ==
	Club	Gp	W	T	L	GF–GA	Pts
1.	SC Riessersee	22	19	0	3	130:48	38:6
2.	Mannheimer ERC	22	16	0	6	135:90	32:12
3.	Düsseldorfer EG	22	13	3	6	142:84	29:15
4.	EV Landshut	22	12	2	8	144:102	26:18
5.	Berliner SC	22	12	1	9	123:100	25:19
6.	Kölner EC (M)	22	11	2	9	116:95	24:20
7.	EV Füssen	22	9	2	11	90:115	20:24
8.	VfL Bad Nauheim	22	7	4	11	96:136	18:26
9.	Duisburger SC (N)	22	7	3	12	102:122	17:27
10.	ECD Iserlohn	22	6	2	14	78:137	14:30
11.	ERC Freiburg (N)	22	4	3	15	65:126	11:33
12.	SB Rosenheim	22	4	2	16	63:129	10:34

== Second round ==
=== Group 1 ===
	Club	Gp	W	T	L	GF–GA	Pts
1.	SC Riessersee	34	27	0	7	219:131	54:14
2.	EV Landshut	34	22	2	10	218:143	46:22
3.	EV Füssen	34	13	4	18	132:172	30:38
4.	ECD Iserlohn	34	6	4	24	110:215	16:52

=== Group 2 ===
	Club	Gp	W	T	L	GF–GA	Pts
1.	Mannheimer ERC	34	27	1	6	198:88	55:13
2.	Berliner SC	34	20	1	13	200:149	41:27
3.	VfL Bad Nauheim	34	10	4	20	144:211	24:44
4.	ERC Freiburg (N)	34	4	4	26	107:212	14:54

=== Group 3 ===
	Club	Gp	W	T	L	GF–GA	Pts
1.	Düsseldorfer EG	34	24	4	6	224:125	52:16
2.	Kölner EC (M)	34	15	2	17	175:162	32:36
3.	Duisburger SC (N)	34	10	6	18	163:188	26:42
4.	SB Rosenheim	34	6	6	22	114:208	18:50

== Final round ==
	Club	Gp	W	T	L	GF–GA	Pts
1.	Mannheimer ERC	48	36	2	10	304:196	74:22
2.	Düsseldorfer EG	48	33	5	10	286:180	71:25
3.	SC Riessersee	48	34	1	13	264:141	69:27
4.	EV Landshut	48	28	4	16	299:213	60:36
5.	Berliner SC	48	25	2	21	269:229	52:44
6.	Kölner EC (M)	48	20	2	26	253:258	42:54
7.	Duisburger SC (N)	48	17	6	25	228:259	40:56
8.	EV Füssen	48	17	6	25	200:254	40:56

== Relegation ==
	Club	Gp	W	T	L	GF–GA	Pts
1.	VfL Bad Nauheim	12	8	0	4	63:37	16:8
2.	SB Rosenheim	12	8	0	4	49:39	16:8
3.	ECD Iserlohn	12	6	0	6	46:50	12:12
4.	ERC Freiburg	12	2	0	10	30:62	4:20
