= 1989–90 ice hockey Bundesliga season =

German ice hockey season

The 1989–90 Ice hockey Bundesliga season was the 32nd season of the Ice hockey Bundesliga, the top level of ice hockey in Germany. 10 teams participated in the league, and Düsseldorfer EG won the championship.

== First round ==
	Club	GP	W	T	L	GF–GA	Pts
1.	Düsseldorfer EG	36	24	3	9	173:110	51:21
2.	Kölner EC	36	24	3	9	162:101	51:21
3.	SB Rosenheim (M)	36	24	1	11	183:112	49:23
4.	BSC Preussen	36	21	3	12	168:118	45:27
5.	Schwenninger ERC	36	16	6	14	157:167	38:34
6.	Eintracht Frankfurt	36	15	5	16	157:167	35:37
7.	Mannheimer ERC	36	15	2	19	125:145	32:40
8.	EC Hedos München (N)	36	12	4	20	152:179	28:44
9.	EV Landshut	36	11	2	23	116:169	24:48
10.	EHC Freiburg	36	2	3	31	114:239	7:65

== Relegation round ==
	Club	GP	W	T	L	GF–GA	Pts
1.	EV Landshut	18	13	2	3	106: 46	28: 8
2.	EHC Freiburg	18	13	1	4	101: 60	27: 9
3.	ESV Kaufbeuren	18	13	0	5	89: 65	26:10
4.	SV Bayreuth	18	11	3	4	103: 63	25:11
5.	ECD Sauerland Iserlohn	18	12	0	6	100: 75	24:12
6.	EHC 80 Nürnberg	18	9	0	9	75: 72	18:18
7.	EHC Essen-West	18	5	1	12	71:103	11:25
8.	Duisburger SV	18	4	2	12	88:122	10:26
9.	EV Landsberg	18	3	1	14	58:105	7:29
10.	ESC Wolfsburg	18	2	0	16	52:132	4:32

== Playoffs ==
=== Quarterfinals ===
			Series	1	2	3	4	5
Düsseldorfer EG	–	Hedos München	3:0	5:1	8:2	9:2	–	–
Kölner EC	–	Mannheimer ERC	3:0	6:3	7:2	4:1	–	–
SB Rosenheim	–	Eintracht Frankfurt	3:0	6:3	8:4	7:1	–	–
BSC Preussen	–	Schwenninger ERC	2:3	2:8	4:1	2:4	6:4	3:4

=== Semifinals ===
			Series	1	2	3	4	5
Düsseldorfer EG	–	Schwenninger ERC	3:0	14:7	5:3	10:6	–	–
Kölner EC	–	SB Rosenheim	0:3	3:4 SO	3:4 OT	1:3	–	–

=== 3rd place ===
			Series	1	2
Schwenninger ERC	–	Kölner EC	9:11	7:1	2:10

=== Final ===
			Series	1	2	3	4	5
Düsseldorfer EG	–	SB Rosenheim	3:2	3:4	4:2	5:1	2:3	8:2
