= TSC Eintracht Dortmund =

German association football club

- Full name: Turn-und Sport-Club Eintracht 1848/1895 Korporation zu Dortmund
- Founded: 1848–1895
- Ground: TSC-Stadion an der Flora
- Capacity: 3,000
- President: Alexander Kiel
- Head coach: Dennis Empting
- League: Kreisliga A Dortmund 1 (IX)
- 2022–23: Kreisliga A Dortmund 1, 11th of 16
- Website: http://www.tsc-eintracht-dortmund.de/
Home colours	Away colours

TSC Eintracht 1848/1895 Dortmund is a German sports club from the city of Dortmund, North Rhine-Westphalia. The club was formed on 9 July 1969 through the merger of Turn- und Sportverein Eintracht 1848 Dortmund and football side Dortmunder Sports Club 1895.

With over 5,500 members the current day association is the largest sports club in the city. In addition to football, the largest of its 27 sports departments are gymnastics, fitness, and field hockey. Other sections within the association include badminton, basketball, fencing, Judo, canoeing, Karate, athletics, rhythmic gymnastics, table tennis, and volleyball.

== History ==
=== TuS Eintracht 1848 Dortmund ===
The club has its origins as the gymnastics club Turnverein Eintracht Dortmund, founded on 15 July 1848, which grew into a broadly based sports association in the interwar period.

Future merger partner Dortmunder SC 1895 established a field hockey section in 1921 which left to join Dortmunder Tennis Club 1898 to create Dortmunder Tennis und Hockey Club, known today as Dortmunder Tennis Klub Rot-Weiss 98. A field hockey section was formed within TVE in 1926 and has played as Dortmunder Hockey-Club der Eintracht since 1954.

Through the late 50s and into the mid 60s the club supported an ice hockey section that played in first and second-level competition. In 1965 the section withdrew from the association to become part of Eishockey Club Westphalia Dortmund.

=== Dortmunder SC 95 ===
Predecessor side Dortmunder SC 1895 was established on 10 May 1895 as Dortmunder Fussball Club 1895 and is recognized as the city's oldest football club. The team folded in 1897, but was re-formed on 27 October 1899. It was joined by Fussball Club Union Dortmund in 1910 and on 13 July 1913 merged with Ballspielverein 1904 Dortmund to become Sportvereinigung Dortmund 1895 before first adopting the name Dortmunder Sport Club 1895 in 1919. This combined side made an appearance in the top flight regional playoff round in 1920–21.

In 1933, SC briefly merged with Ballspiel Club Sportfreunde 06 Dortmund to play as Sportfreunde 1895 Dortmund in the Gauliga Westfalen, one of sixteen top flight divisions formed that year in the re-organization of German football under the Third Reich. The team was relegated after just one season of play there and in 1935 the union ended with the two clubs going their separate ways.

Following World War II most organizations in the country, including sports and football clubs, were ordered dissolved by occupying Allied authorities. The club was re-established in 1945 as Südliche Sportgruppe Dortmund and by 1947 was once again playing as SC. The team played lower tier local football until advancing to the Landesliga Westfalen (III) in 1953. They claimed a title there in 1956 and were promoted to the 2. Liga-West (II) where they competed as a lower table side over the next 7 seasons.

Restructuring of the country's football competition placed SC into the third division Amateurliga Westfalen in 1963. The club finished atop their group within the division, but missed an opportunity to be advance when they were beaten by Eintracht Gelsenkirchen (2:2, 1:1, 0:2) in an extended promotion playoff. The following season the club tumbled from first to fifteenth place and was relegated to the Landesliga Westfalen (IV) where they earned lower-to-mid table results over the next handful of seasons.

=== TSC Eintracht Dortmund ===
After the 1969 merger the football tradition of SC was carried on by Eintracht Dortmund. In the 1969–70 season, Eintracht started in the Landesliga Westfalen, the fourth tier at the time, but suffered relegation to the Bezirksliga due to internal conflicts in their first season. In 1971, the club earned promotion back to the Landesliga. Two years later, they secured the runners-up position, finishing four points behind SV Holzwickede. This period marked the peak of the club's history, but the successful team disbanded. By 1977, Eintracht had once again fallen to the Bezirksliga. Three years later, they dropped to the Kreisliga. After a brief return to the Bezirksliga in the 1982–83 season, the team spent several years in the Kreisliga before making a comeback to the Bezirksliga in 2013. However, they faced relegation once more, this time to the ninth-tier Kreisliga A, after five years.

== Youth academy ==
The football department is renowned for its youth development, with notable players such as Karl-Heinz Granitza, Lars Ricken, and Stefan Klos having played for Eintracht's youth teams. In 1988, Eintracht's under-17 team won the Westphalian championship and reached the German championship semi-finals, where they were eliminated by Hertha Zehlendorf. They achieved victories over Fortuna Düsseldorf and Bayer Leverkusen along the way.

Since the 2014–15 season, Eintracht's under-19 team has competed in the second-tier Westfalenliga. The under-17 and under-15 teams both participate in the Landesliga. In the 2008–09 season, Eintracht's under-17 team briefly played in the Under 17 Bundesliga. The under-15 team earned promotion to the top-tier Regionalliga West in 2011 after a 4–3 victory over Rot Weiss Ahlen but faced relegation a year later. In 2013, they made a return to the Regionalliga West with a 3–0 win over SV Lippstadt 08, only to be relegated once again immediately after.
