= 1983–84 ice hockey Bundesliga season =

Hockey season in Germany

The 1983–84 Ice hockey Bundesliga season was the 26th season of the Ice hockey Bundesliga, the top level of ice hockey in Germany. 10 teams participated in the league, and Kolner EC won the championship.

== First round ==
	Club	GP	W	T	L	GF–GA	Pts
1.	Mannheimer ERC	36	23	4	9	180:103	50:22
2.	Kölner EC	36	21	6	9	155:116	48:24
3.	SB Rosenheim	36	18	11	7	142:118	47:25
4.	EV Landshut (M)	36	21	4	11	165:110	46:26
5.	Schwenninger ERC	36	16	4	16	127:109	36:36
6.	ESV Kaufbeuren	36	13	6	17	143:165	32:40
7.	ERC Freiburg (N)	36	13	6	17	110:154	32:40
8.	Düsseldorfer EG	36	11	3	22	102:157	25:47
9.	ECD Iserlohn	36	10	4	22	114:134	24:48
10.	SC Riessersee	36	9	2	25	103:169	20:52

== Relegation round ==
	Club	GP	W	T	L	GF–GA	Pts
1.	ECD Iserlohn	10	6	3	1	56:33	15:5
2.	SC Riessersee	10	6	1	3	42:24	13:7
3.	EHC Essen-West	10	4	2	4	37:39	10:10
4.	Duisburger SC	10	4	1	5	47:55	9:11
5.	BSC Preussen	10	3	1	6	37:48	7:13
6.	SV Bayreuth	10	2	2	6	34:54	6:14

== Group phase ==
=== Group A ===
	Club	GP	W	T	L	GF–GA	Pts
1.	EV Landshut (M)	6	4	0	2	35:19	8:4
2.	Mannheimer ERC	6	3	1	2	41:28	7:5
3.	Schwenninger ERC	6	2	1	3	24:30	5:7
4.	Düsseldorfer EG	6	2	0	4	22:45	4:8

=== Group B ===
	Club	GP	W	T	L	GF–GA	Pts
1.	Kölner EC	6	4	0	2	38:25	8:4
2.	ESV Kaufbeuren	6	4	0	2	29:25	8:4
3.	SB Rosenheim	6	2	1	3	18:25	5:7
4.	ERC Freiburg (N)	6	1	1	4	17:27	3:9

== Playoffs ==
=== Placing round ===
==== First round ====
			Series	1	2
Düsseldorfer EG	–	SB Rosenheim	3:7	2:3	1:4
ERC Freiburg	–	Schwenninger ERC	9:8	6:2	3:6 OT

==== 7th place ====
			Series	1	2
Düsseldorfer EG	–	Schwenninger ERC	12:11	7:4	5:7 OT

==== 5th place ====
			Series	1	2
ERC Freiburg	–	SB Rosenheim	7:21	3:6	4:15

=== Semifinals ===
			Series	1	2	3	4	5
EV Landshut	–	ESV Kaufbeuren	3:2	2:7	1:5	10:2	8:2	3:0
Kölner EC	–	Mannheimer ERC	3:0	7:3	3:2 OT	4:0	–	–

=== 3rd place ===
			Series	1	2
ESV Kaufbeuren	–	Mannheimer ERC	6:10	2:4	4:6

=== Final ===
			Series	1	2	3	4	5
Kölner EC	–	EV Landshut	3:2	5:4	4:6	2:3	4:3	5:0
