= Essen Mosquitoes =

- City: Essen
- League: Oberliga Nord
- Founded: 1994; 32 years ago
- Home arena: Eissporthalle Essen-West (capacity: 3,850)
- Website: https://www.moskitos-essen.de/

The Essen Mosquitoes were a professional ice hockey team from Essen, Germany that competed in the Deutsche Eishockey Liga (DEL) from 1999–2000 until the 2001–02 when they lost their license due to insolvency. After this the team played in the 2.Bundesliga, and the Oberliga Nord. After the 24/25 Season the Team lost its license and got disbanded. As a successor team the EHC Eagles Essen-West took over the starting place, some of its players and youth teams as well as its location in the Eishalle West.
