= EC Bad Nauheim =

- City: Bad Nauheim, Germany
- League: DEL2
- Founded: 1982
- Home arena: Colonel Knight Stadion
- Colours: Red, white
- General manager: Andreas Ortwein
- Head coach: Harry Lange
- Captain: Marc El-Sayed
- Website: www.ec-bn.de

Franchise history
- 1946-1981: VfL Bad Nauheim
- 1981-2004: EC Bad Nauheim
- 2004-2006: Rote Teufel Bad Nauheim
- 2006-2013: EC Rote Teufel Bad Nauheim
- 2013-present: EC Bad Nauheim

EC Bad Nauheim, is an ice hockey team in Bad Nauheim, Germany. They currently play in DEL2, the second level of ice hockey in Germany. Prior to the 2013–14 season they played in the Oberliga. The club was founded in 1946 as VfL Bad Nauheim.

== Achievements ==
- Oberliga champion : 1984, 2013.
- 1. Liga North runner-up: 1998.
- 2. Bundesliga runner-up: 1999.
