= Tölzer Löwen =

Sports club

- City: Bad Tölz, Germany
- League: Oberliga
- Founded: 1928
- Home arena: Hacker-Pschorr-Arena
- Colours: Black, yellow
- Head coach: Kevin Gaudet
- Captain: Philipp Schlager

Franchise history
- 1928–2001: EC Bad Tölz
- 2001–present: Tölzer Löwen

Tölzer Löwen is an ice hockey team in Bad Tölz, Germany. They play in the Oberliga, the third level of German ice hockey.

== History ==
The club was founded in 1928. They won the Ice hockey Bundesliga twice in the 1960s. In 2005, Bad Tölz was relegated to the Oberliga. In 2017 they lost the Oberliga play-off-finals 3-1 against Dutch side, the Tilburg Trappers (playing in the Oberliga Nord), but they were allowed to promote to the DEL2 as the Tilburg Trappers could not be promoted as they are a Dutch team.

== Achievements ==
- 1.Bundesliga champion: 1962, 1966.
- 2.Bundesliga champion: 1987, 1989, 1990, 1997.
- Oberliga champion: 1994, 2012.
- Oberliga Süd champion 2016.
