= ESV Kaufbeuren =

German ice hockey team

- City: Kaufbeuren, Germany
- League: Oberliga
- Founded: 1946
- Home arena: Erdgas Schwaben Arena (capacity: 3,100)
- Colours: Yellow, red
- General manager: Tobias Peukert
- Head coach: Leif Carlsson
- Captain: Bernhard Ebner
- Website: www.esvk.de

Franchise history
- 1946–1994: ESV Kaufbeuren
- 1994–1998: Kaufbeurer Adler
- 1998–present: ESV Kaufbeuren

ESV Kaufbeuren (ESVK) is a semi- professional ice hockey team based in Kaufbeuren, Germany. They currently play in the Oberliga, the third level of ice hockey in Germany. Prior to the 2013–14 season, they played in the 2nd Bundesliga.

The club was founded in 1946. In the early years, home matches were held on a natural ice surface at the Kaiserweiher, before the club's first stadium with artificial ice was opened in 1956. As a result of this new home, the team became more successful and was promoted to the German highest league, the Oberliga, for the first time.

The team has competed continuously in Germany's highest leagues (Oberliga and Bundesliga) with various stints in the second division. In 1997, professional hockey in Kaufbeuren collapsed when the Kaufbeurer Adler went bankrupt and had to suspend operations in the middle of the 1997/1998 DEL season.

With a new beginning in the 2. Liga Süd in 1998, the revived team was nicknamed Buron Joker. Since 2009 it has competed in Germany's second-highest league, the 2. Bundesliga, later called DEL2. Since 2017 the team has played at the new Erdgas Schwaben Arena.

== Season records ==
| Season | Games | Won | OTW | SOW | OTL | SOL | Lost | Points | Goals for | Goals against | Rank | Playoffs |
|---|---|---|---|---|---|---|---|---|---|---|---|---|
| Oberliga Süd 2007-08 | 52 | 29 | 5 | — | 3 | — | 18 | 99 | 210 | 155 | 4 | Lost in Quarterfinals |
| Oberliga Süd 2008-09 | 62 | 38 | 5 | — | 4 | — | 15 | 284 | 184 | 97 | 3 | Champions/ Promoted |
| 2nd Bundesliga 2009-10 | 52 | 16 | 3 | 1 | 4 | 7 | 21 | 67 | 151 | 181 | 10 | Lost in Quarterfinals |
| 2nd Bundesliga 2010–11 | 48 | 25 | 0 | 4 | 1 | 1 | 17 | 85 | 160 | 134 | 5 | Lost in Quarterfinals |
| 2nd Bundesliga 2011–12 | 48 | 22 | 3 | 1 | 3 | 1 | 18 | 78 | 159 | 155 | 5 | Lost in Quarterfinals |

== Tournament results ==
| Year | 1st round | 2nd round | Quarterfinals | Semifinals | Finals |
|---|---|---|---|---|---|
| Eishockeypokal 2002–03 | L, 1-3, Frankfurt Lions | — | — | — | — |
| Eishockeypokal 2003–04 | L, 2-5, Frankfurt Lions | — | — | — | — |
| Eishockeypokal 2004–05 | W, 3–0, Hamburg Freezers | L, 0-4, Landshut Cannibals | — | — | — |
| Eishockeypokal 2005–06 | L, 1–2, Nürnberg Ice Tigers | — | — | — | — |
| Eishockeypokal 2006–07 | L, 5–7, Augsburger Panther | — | — | — | — |
| Eishockeypokal 2007–08 | L, 1-5, Augsburger Panther | — | — | — | — |
| DEB-Pokal 2009–10 | — | L, 1-4, EV Ravensburg | — | — | — |
| DEB-Pokal 2010–11 | L, 3-4, EV Ravensburg | — | — | — | — |
| DEB-Pokal 2011–12 | L, 1-4, Heilbronner Falken | — | — | — | — |

== Achievements ==
- 2nd Bundesliga champion: 1959, 1969, 1974, 1977, 1980, 1991.
