= Peter Draisaitl =

German ice hockey coach and player (born 1965)

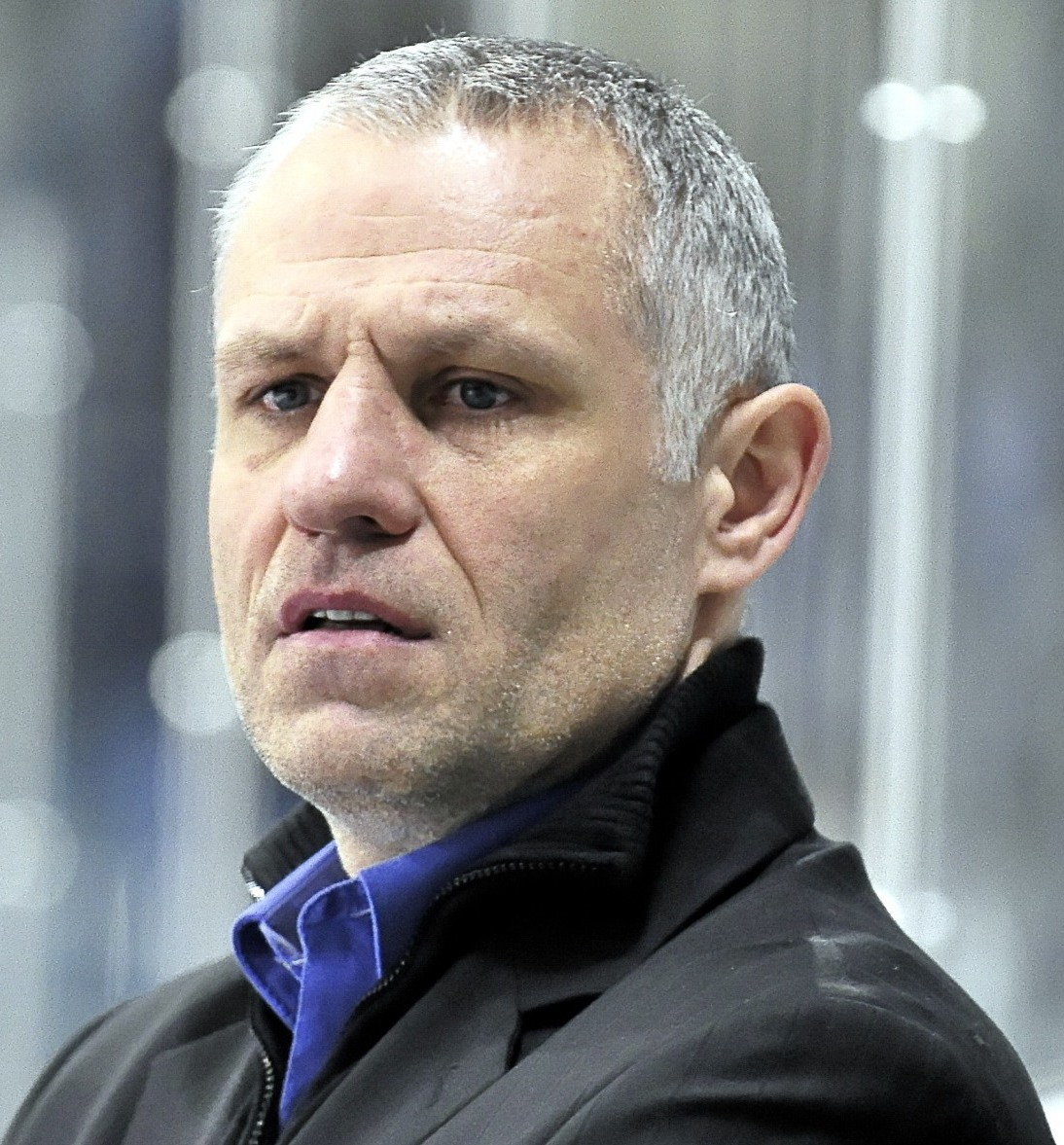
- Draisaitl in 2008 as coach of EVR Tower Stars
- Born: 7 December 1965 (age 60) Karviná, Czechoslovakia
- Height: 6 ft 0 in (183 cm)
- Weight: 190 lb (86 kg; 13 st 8 lb)
- Position: Centre
- Shot: Left
- Played for: Mannheimer ERC; Kölner Haie; Moskitos Essen; Revierlöwen Oberhausen
- National team: West Germany and Germany
- NHL draft: Undrafted
- Playing career: 1983–2001

Peter Draisaitl (born 7 December 1965) is a German professional ice hockey coach and former player who is the head coach of Krefeld Pinguine of the DEL2. He was previously the head coach of Kölner Haie of the Deutsche Eishockey Liga (DEL) from November 2017 until January 2019.

Draisaitl was born as part of the German minority in Czechoslovakia and played in numerous international tournaments as a member of the West German and German national teams, including competing at the 1988, 1992, and 1998 Winter Olympics. He also spent 18 years playing professionally in Germany, mostly with Mannheimer ERC (now Adler Mannheim) and Kölner EC (later Kölner Haie). He also played briefly with Moskitos Essen and Revierlöwen Oberhausen.

Draisaitl is the father of 2020 Hart Memorial Trophy winner, Leon Draisaitl, who was selected third overall by the Edmonton Oilers in the 2014 NHL entry draft.

== Career statistics ==
=== Regular season and playoffs ===
			Regular season					Playoffs
Season	Team	League	GP	G	A	Pts	PIM	GP	G	A	Pts	PIM
1983–84	Mannheimer ERC	1.GBun	20	3	2	5	4	5	0	0	0	0
1984–85	Mannheimer ERC	1.GBun	32	8	9	17	10	12	1	0	1	2
1985–86	Mannheimer ERC	1.GBun	36	12	18	30	23	3	0	0	0	7
1986–87	Mannheimer ERC	1.GBun	45	16	23	39	56	10	2	1	3	6
1987–88	Mannheimer ERC	1.GBun	35	14	20	34	12	8	1	2	3	4
1988–89	Mannheimer ERC	1.GBun	36	13	24	37	22	9	9	5	14	2
1989–90	Mannheimer ERC	1.GBun	36	25	21	46	23	3	0	2	2	4
1990–91	Kölner EC	1.GBun	43	37	43	80	47	14	6	8	14	12
1991–92	Kölner EC	1.GBun	31	16	31	47	24	4	0	1	1	0
1992–93	Mannheimer ERC	1.GBun	32	14	25	39	13	8	1	3	4	4
1993–94	Mannheimer ERC	1.GBun	43	19	29	48	36	4	1	2	3	9
1994–95	Kölner Haie	DEL	43	26	38	64	28	18	12	7	19	18
1995–96	Kölner Haie	DEL	49	24	37	61	22	14	9	14	23	10
1996–97	Kölner Haie	DEL	43	26	26	52	16	4	0	2	2	0
1997–98	Kölner Haie	DEL	40	9	21	30	20	3	0	0	0	0
1998–99	ESC Moskitos Essen	GER.2	56	26	36	62	32	11	8	4	12	2
1999–2000	Moskitos Essen	DEL	56	9	20	29	42	—	—	—	—	—
2000–01	Revierlöwen Oberhausen	DEL	55	8	14	22	79	1	0	0	0	0
1.GBun totals			389	177	245	422	270	80	21	24	45	50
DEL totals			286	102	156	258	207	40	21	23	44	28

=== International ===
Year	Team	Event	GP	G	A	Pts	PIM
1983	West Germany	EJC	5	3	1	4	4
1984	West Germany	WJC	7	3	2	5	2
1988	West Germany	OG	8	0	1	1	4
1989	West Germany	WC	6	0	0	0	2
1990	West Germany	WC	7	0	1	1	0
1991	Germany	WC	10	1	2	3	6
1992	Germany	OG	8	2	0	2	4
1992	Germany	WC	6	1	3	4	2
1996	Germany	WC	6	3	0	3	0
1996	Germany	WCH	4	1	4	5	2
1997	Germany	WC	8	2	2	4	2
1998	Germany	OG	4	2	2	4	0
1998	Germany	WC	6	2	2	4	2
Junior totals			12	6	3	9	6
Senior totals			73	14	17	31	24
