= Andreas Lupzig =

German ice hockey player

- Born: 5 August 1968 (age 58) Straubing, West Germany
- Height: 6 ft 2 in (188 cm)
- Weight: 198 lb (90 kg; 14 st 2 lb)
- Position: Left wing
- Shot: Left
- Played for: Kölner Haie; Nürnberg Ice Tigers; Revier Löwen Oberhausen; Heilbronner EC; Straubing Tigers; Deggendorf Fire
- NHL draft: 239th overall, 1988; Chicago Blackhawks
- Playing career: 1989–2007

Andreas Lupzig (born 5 August 1968) is a German former professional ice hockey player. He competed in the men's tournament at the 1998 Winter Olympics.

== Career statistics ==
=== Regular season and playoffs ===
			Regular season					Playoffs
Season	Team	League	GP	G	A	Pts	PIM	GP	G	A	Pts	PIM
1985–86	EV Landshut	FRG U20
1985–86	EV Landshut	1.GBun	23	1	3	4	12	3	0	1	1	0
1986–87	EV Landshut	1.GBun	35	6	7	13	37	4	1	0	1	2
1987–88	EV Landshut	FRG U20
1987–88	EV Landshut	1.GBun	28	6	5	11	24	4	1	2	3	9
1989–90	Kölner EC	1.GBun	33	16	18	34	77	8	6	4	10	8
1991–92	Kölner EC	1.GBun	44	13	21	34	38	3	0	1	1	0
1992–93	Kölner EC	1.GBun	44	4	11	15	50	12	2	4	6	4
1993–94	Kölner EC	1.GBun	44	4	8	12	49	10	2	1	3	16
1994–95	Kölner Haie	DEL	34	10	5	15	46	18	7	4	11	36
1995–96	Kölner Haie	DEL	46	19	24	43	116	7	1	4	5	18
1996–97	Kölner Haie	DEL	49	12	22	34	79	4	0	1	1	4
1997–98	Kölner Haie	DEL	29	2	2	4	46	3	0	0	0	2
1998–99	Kölner Haie	DEL	51	2	4	6	80	5	1	0	1	12
1999–2000	Kölner Haie	DEL	39	2	5	7	88	4	0	0	0	4
2000–01	Kölner Haie	DEL	45	2	3	5	34	3	0	0	0	2
2001–02	Nürnberg Ice Tigers	DEL	9	0	0	0	27	4	0	0	0	6
2001–02	Revier Löwen Oberhausen	DEL	29	7	4	11	60	—	—	—	—	—
2002–03	Heilbronner EC	GER.2	45	10	13	23	102	4	0	0	0	8
2003–04	Straubing Tigers	GER.2	39	10	25	35	112	3	0	1	1	8
2004–05	Straubing Tigers	GER.2	12	2	3	5	12	13	5	8	13	36
2006–07	Deggendorf Fire	GER.4	30	7	7	14	56	—	—	—	—	—
1.GBun totals			287	61	86	147	343	47	13	15	28	41
DEL totals			331	56	69	125	576	48	9	9	18	84

=== International ===
Year	Team	Event	GP	G	A	Pts	PIM
1985	West Germany	EJC	5	1	1	2
1986	West Germany	WJC	7	0	1	1	0
1986	West Germany	EJC	5	2	4	6	2
1987	West Germany	WJC B	5	6	7	13	16
1988	West Germany	WJC	7	4	1	5	8
1990	West Germany	WC	10	1	2	3	12
1995	Germany	WC	5	0	1	1	10
1996	Germany	WCH	4	1	1	2	0
1997	Germany	OGQ	3	0	1	1	2
1997	Germany	WC	7	0	2	2	8
1998	Germany	OG	4	0	0	0	4
1998	Germany	WC	6	2	1	3	8
Junior totals			29	13	14	27	26
Senior totals			39	4	8	12	44
