= Dieter Hegen =

German ice hockey player

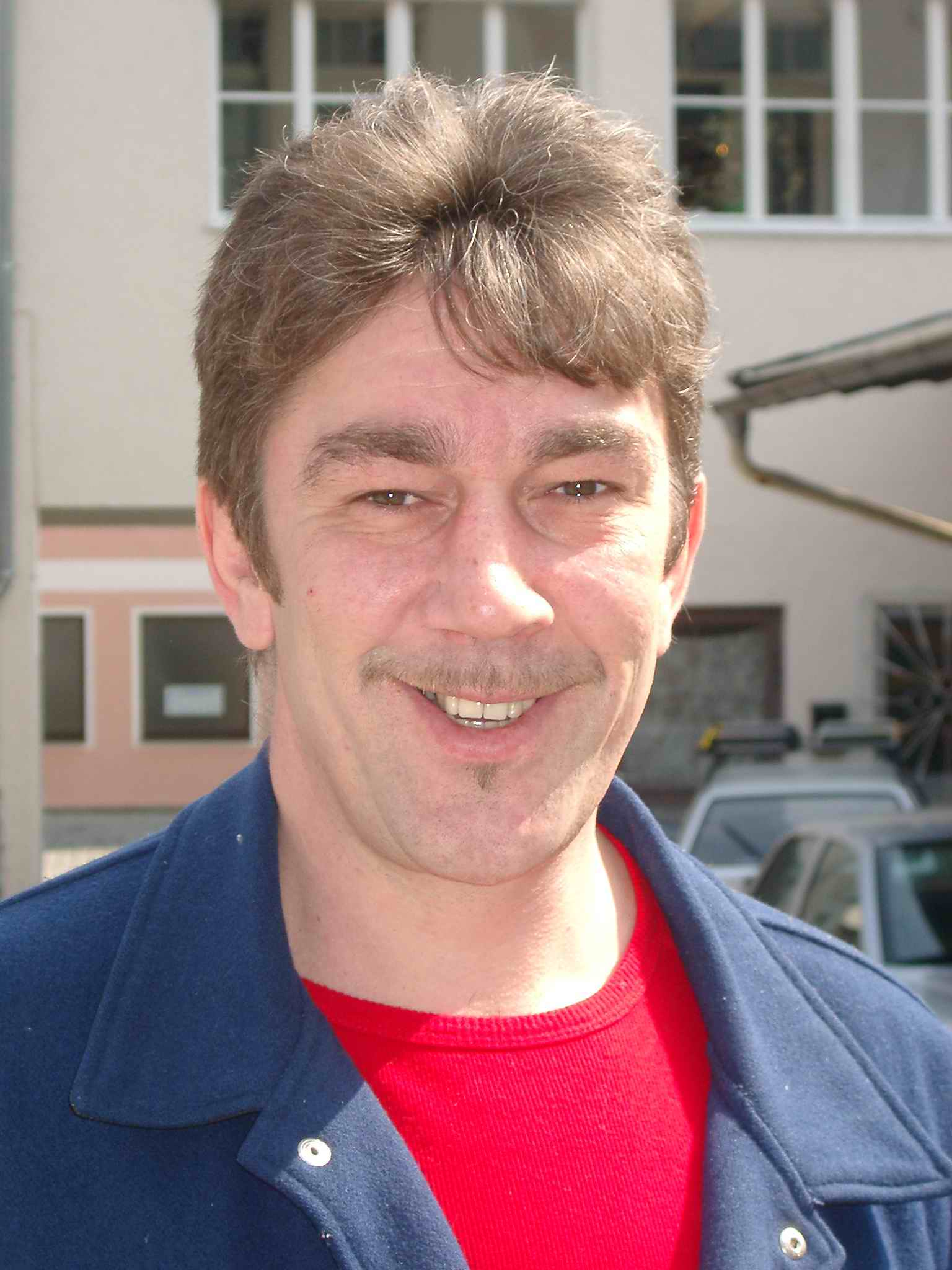
- Born: April 29, 1962 (age 64) Kaufbeuren, FRG
- Height: 6 ft 0 in (183 cm)
- Weight: 198 lb (90 kg; 14 st 2 lb)
- Position: Left wing
- Shot: Left
- Played for: ESV Kaufbeuren; Kölner EC; Düsseldorfer EG; EC Hedos München/Maddogs München; Star Bulls Rosenheim
- National team: Germany and West Germany
- NHL draft: 46th overall, 1981; Montreal Canadiens
- Playing career: 1979–2002

Dieter Hegen (born April 29, 1962, in Kaufbeuren, West Germany) is a retired professional ice hockey player who played in the Eishockey-Bundesliga and its replacement the Deutsche Eishockey Liga. He was inducted into the IIHF Hall of Fame in 2010.

== Playing career ==
Hegen began playing for his hometown ESV Kaufbeuren in 1979. Hegen was drafted 46th overall by the Montreal Canadiens in the 1981 NHL entry draft but never signed a contract and remained with Kaufbeuren until 1985 when he joined Kölner EC, winning the Bundesliga championship in 1987 and 1988. In 1989 he moved to for Düsseldorfer EG and in a three-year spell he won three more Bundesliga titles. In 1992, he joined EC Hedos München and won his sixth and final Bundesliga title with the team in 1994, which turned out to be the last year of the Ice Hockey Bundesliga as it was replaced with the Deutsche Eishockey Liga. The team also changed its name to Maddogs München for the inaugural DEL season which turned out to be their only season as they would fold on December 18, 1994, just 27 games into the 44-game season. Hegen would re-join DEG and went to win the DEL championship in 1996. In 1998, he moved to Star Bulls Rosenheim. In 2000, Rosenheim left the DEL and Hegen decided to drop two divisions to the Oberliga and re-join ESV Kaufbeuren. He remained with the team until his retirement in 2002.

== International career ==
Hegen was a member of the German 1984 Canada Cup and competed in five Winter Olympics in 1984, 1988, 1992, 1994 and 1998. His appearance at the 1998 Olympics made him, along with Raimo Helminen (Finland) the third and fourth hockey players to ever compete at five Winter Olympics, after Udo Kießling (Germany) and Petter Thoresen (Norway).

Hegen was inducted into the IIHF Hall of Fame in 2010.

== Career statistics ==
=== Regular season and playoffs ===
			Regular season					Playoffs
Season	Team	League	GP	G	A	Pts	PIM	GP	G	A	Pts	PIM
1979–80	ESV Kaufbeuren	FRG.2	42	60	64	121	51	—	—	—	—	—
1980–81	ESV Kaufbeuren	1.GBun	43	54	35	89	34	—	—	—	—	—
1981–82	ESV Kaufbeuren	1.GBun	47	45	36	81	51	3	3	0	3	7
1982–83	ESV Kaufbeuren	1.GBun	36	38	15	53	60	7	8	7	15	18
1983–84	ESV Kaufbeuren	1.GBun	41	39	23	62	58	6	7	4	11	17
1984–85	ESV Kaufbeuren	1.GBun	33	31	23	54	40	9	7	4	11	25
1985–86	ESV Kaufbeuren	1.GBun	26	21	25	46	43	4	2	4	6	2
1986–87	Kölner EC	1.GBun	33	14	19	33	18	—	—	—	—	—
1987–88	Kölner EC	1.GBun	35	26	35	61	34	11	4	5	9	12
1988–89	Kölner EC	1.GBun	36	35	31	66	27	9	3	5	8	12
1989–90	Düsseldorfer EG	1.GBun	36	34	15	49	36	11	13	12	25	20
1990–91	Düsseldorfer EG	1.GBun	32	29	14	43	35	13	13	6	19	8
1991–92	Düsseldorfer EG	1.GBun	44	41	42	83	26	9	8	13	21	6
1992–93	Hedos München	1.GBun	44	23	18	41	48	4	2	3	5	0
1993–94	Hedos München	1.GBun	44	21	26	47	39	9	10	11	21	6
1994–95	Mad Dogs München	DEL	15	13	12	25	28	—	—	—	—	—
1994–95	Düsseldorfer EG	DEL	24	17	20	37	14	5	1	3	4	2
1995–96	Düsseldorfer EG	DEL	48	24	31	55	38	13	3	7	10	10
1996–97	Düsseldorfer EG	DEL	41	17	22	39	24	4	2	4	6	6
1997–98	Düsseldorfer EG	DEL	46	23	23	46	59	3	0	1	1	0
1998–99	Star Bulls Rosenheim GmbH	DEL	46	16	20	36	62	—	—	—	—	—
1999–2000	Star Bulls Rosenheim GmbH	DEL	33	4	14	18	20	—	—	—	—	—
2000–01	ESV Kaufbeuren	GER.3	45	30	24	54	85	3	1	1	2	2
2001–02	ESV Kaufbeuren	GER.3	28	8	15	23	42	—	—	—	—	—
1.GBun totals			530	451	357	808	549	95	80	74	154	133
DEL totals			253	114	142	256	245	25	6	15	21	18

=== International ===
Year	Team	Event	GP	G	A	Pts	PIM
1979	West Germany	EJC	5	0	1	1	2
1980	West Germany	EJC	5	6	4	10	10
1981	West Germany	WJC	5	8	1	9	12
1982	West Germany	WJC	7	7	2	9	12
1982	West Germany	WC	7	1	0	1	0
1983	West Germany	WC	10	3	1	4	2
1984	West Germany	OG	6	4	1	5	2
1984	West Germany	CC	4	0	0	0	0
1985	West Germany	WC	10	5	5	10	4
1986	West Germany	WC	9	1	1	2	8
1987	West Germany	WC	8	5	2	7	4
1988	West Germany	OG	8	5	2	7	4
1989	West Germany	WC	10	2	3	5	16
1990	West Germany	WC	10	1	1	2	10
1991	Germany	WC	10	3	2	5	0
1992	Germany	OG	8	4	3	7	6
1992	Germany	WC	6	7	2	9	10
1993	Germany	WC	6	6	2	8	10
1994	Germany	OG	8	2	1	3	4
1996	Germany	WC	6	2	1	3	2
1996	Germany	WCH	4	0	1	1	6
1997	Germany	OGQ	3	0	1	1	2
1997	Germany	WC	8	0	0	0	6
1998	Germany	OG	3	1	0	1	0
1998	Germany	WC	6	3	1	4	0
Junior totals			22	21	8	29	36
Senior totals			146	55	30	85	96
