= Gerd Truntschka =

German ice hockey player

- Born: 10 September 1958 (age 68) Landshut, West Germany
- Height: 5 ft 9 in (175 cm)
- Weight: 165 lb (75 kg; 11 st 11 lb)
- Position: Centre
- Shot: Left
- Played for: EV Landshut; Kölner EC; Düsseldorfer EG; Hedos München
- National team: West Germany and Germany
- NHL draft: 200th overall, 1978; St. Louis Blues
- Playing career: 1975–1994

Gerhard Truntschka (born 10 September 1958 in Landshut, West Germany) is a retired professional ice hockey player who played in the Ice hockey Bundesliga.

== Playing career ==
Truntschka played for Kölner Haie and DEG Metro Stars. He played for West Germany 1984 Canada Cup as well as three Winter Olympics. He competed for the West German national team at the 1980 Winter Olympics and also played for the German national team at the 1992 Winter Olympics.

== Career statistics ==
=== Regular season and playoffs ===
| | | | Regular season | | | | | Playoffs |
| Season | Team | League | GP | G | A | Pts | PIM | GP | G | A | Pts | PIM |
|---|---|---|---|---|---|---|---|---|---|---|---|---|
| 1975–76 | EV Landshut | 1.GBun | 23 | 12 | 6 | 18 | 8 | — | — | — | — | — |
| 1976–77 | EV Landshut | 1.GBun | 46 | 33 | 25 | 58 | 36 | — | — | — | — | — |
| 1978–79 | EV Landshut | 1.GBun | 49 | 52 | 54 | 106 | 49 | — | — | — | — | — |
| 1979–80 | Kölner EC | 1.GBun | 44 | 38 | 45 | 83 | 84 | — | — | — | — | — |
| 1980–81 | Kölner EC | 1.GBun | 43 | 20 | 53 | 73 | 56 | — | — | — | — | — |
| 1981–82 | Kölner EC | 1.GBun | 44 | 40 | 59 | 99 | 59 | 8 | 6 | 10 | 16 | 4 |
| 1982–83 | Kölner EC | 1.GBun | 30 | 17 | 40 | 57 | 18 | 9 | 2 | 10 | 12 | 20 |
| 1983–84 | Kölner EC | 1.GBun | 42 | 22 | 57 | 79 | 61 | 8 | 4 | 4 | 8 | 14 |
| 1984–85 | Kölner EC | 1.GBun | 36 | 22 | 35 | 57 | 37 | 9 | 6 | 8 | 14 | 18 |
| 1985–86 | Kölner EC | 1.GBun | 35 | 14 | 54 | 68 | 24 | 10 | 2 | 15 | 17 | 12 |
| 1986–87 | Kölner EC | 1.GBun | 45 | 16 | 49 | 65 | 53 | — | — | — | — | — |
| 1987–88 | Kölner EC | 1.GBun | 35 | 21 | 48 | 69 | 18 | 11 | 5 | 6 | 11 | 27 |
| 1988–89 | Kölner EC | 1.GBun | 33 | 25 | 49 | 74 | 36 | 9 | 4 | 8 | 12 | 16 |
| 1989–90 | Düsseldorfer EG | 1.GBun | 36 | 9 | 40 | 49 | 60 | — | — | — | — | — |
| 1990–91 | Düsseldorfer EG | 1.GBun | 44 | 19 | 63 | 82 | 40 | 11 | 10 | 23 | 33 | 14 |
| 1991–92 | Düsseldorfer EG | 1.GBun | 43 | 18 | 67 | 85 | 53 | 3 | 2 | 3 | 5 | 4 |
| 1992–93 | Hedos München | 1.GBun | 4 | 0 | 3 | 3 | 2 | — | — | — | — | — |
| 1993–94 | Hedos München | 1.GBun | 40 | 11 | 33 | 44 | 49 | 10 | 6 | 10 | 16 | 10 |
| 1.GBun totals | | | 707 | 408 | 793 | 1201 | 777 | 88 | 47 | 97 | 144 | 139 |

=== International ===
| Year | Team | Event | GP | G | A | Pts | PIM |
|---|---|---|---|---|---|---|---|
| 1976 | West Germany | EJC | 4 | 2 | 7 | 9 | 6 |
| 1977 | West Germany | WJC | 7 | 4 | 5 | 9 | 8 |
| 1978 | West Germany | WJC | 6 | 7 | 3 | 10 | 12 |
| 1979 | West Germany | WC | 8 | 2 | 2 | 4 | 6 |
| 1980 | West Germany | OLY | 5 | 3 | 3 | 6 | 9 |
| 1982 | West Germany | WC | 7 | 2 | 3 | 5 | 8 |
| 1983 | West Germany | WC | 10 | 2 | 4 | 6 | 6 |
| 1984 | West Germany | OLY | 6 | 1 | 1 | 2 | 8 |
| 1984 | West Germany | CC | 5 | 1 | 2 | 3 | 4 |
| 1986 | West Germany | WC | 10 | 4 | 6 | 10 | 14 |
| 1987 | West Germany | WC | 10 | 3 | 8 | 11 | 13 |
| 1988 | West Germany | OLY | 8 | 3 | 7 | 10 | 10 |
| 1989 | West Germany | WC | 10 | 3 | 3 | 6 | 14 |
| 1990 | West Germany | WC | 10 | 4 | 6 | 10 | 15 |
| 1992 | Germany | OLY | 7 | 2 | 5 | 7 | 6 |
| 1992 | Germany | WC | 7 | 0 | 6 | 6 | 4 |
| 1993 | Germany | WC | 6 | 1 | 3 | 4 | 6 |
| Junior totals | | | 17 | 13 | 15 | 28 | 26 |
| Senior totals | | | 109 | 31 | 59 | 90 | 123 |

== Sources ==
- Biographical information and career statistics from Eliteprospects.com, or Eurohockey.com, or The Internet Hockey Database
