= Doug Berry (ice hockey) =

Canadian ice hockey player (b. 1957)

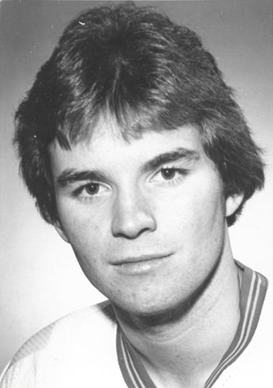
- Berry in 1979 photo
- Born: June 3, 1957 (age 68) New Westminster, British Columbia, Canada
- Height: 6 ft 1 in (185 cm)
- Weight: 190 lb (86 kg; 13 st 8 lb)
- Position: Centre
- Shot: Left
- Played for: Edmonton Oilers; Colorado Rockies
- NHL draft: 38th overall, 1977; Colorado Rockies
- WHA draft: 17th overall, 1977; Calgary Cowboys
- Playing career: 1978–1992

Douglas Alan Berry (born June 3, 1957) is a Canadian former professional ice hockey player, a centreman in the World Hockey Association (WHA) and the National Hockey League (NHL).

== Early life ==
Berry was born in New Westminster, British Columbia, and raised in neighboring Burnaby. He played college hockey for the Denver Pioneers men's ice hockey at the University of Denver, where he was selected to the All-WCHA First Team for 1977–78.

== Career ==
Berry was drafted in 1977 by both the WHA and the NHL, choosing to start his major professional career with the WHA's Edmonton Oilers, in that league's final (1978–79) season, appearing in 29 games and scoring six goals and three assists. He then played two seasons in the NHL, with the Colorado Rockies, appearing in 121 games and scoring 10 goals and 33 assists for 43 points.

Berry played the majority of his career in West Germany, spending 10 seasons in the top level Eishockey-Bundesliga, appearing in 402 games and scoring 286 goals and 351 assists for 637 points. While playing with the Kölner Haie (Cologne Sharks), the team won three consecutive Bundesliga championships. Berry retired from hockey after the 1991–92 Bundesliga season.

== Personal life ==
Berry's younger brother, Ken Berry, also played in the NHL and Bundesliga.

== Career statistics ==
=== Regular season and playoffs ===
			Regular season					Playoffs
Season	Team	League	GP	G	A	Pts	PIM	GP	G	A	Pts	PIM
1974–75	Kelowna Buckaroos	BCJHL	66	37	103	140	45	—	—	—	—	—
1975–76	University of Denver	WCHA	39	12	28	40	32	—	—	—	—	—
1976–77	University of Denver	WCHA	40	17	41	58	42	—	—	—	—	—
1977–78	University of Denver	WCHA	40	36	46	82	36	—	—	—	—	—
1978–79	Edmonton Oilers	WHA	29	6	3	9	4	—	—	—	—	—
1978–79	Dallas Black Hawks	CHL	44	19	34	53	15	9	0	7	7	0
1979–80	Colorado Rockies	NHL	75	7	23	30	16	—	—	—	—	—
1980–81	Colorado Rockies	NHL	46	3	10	13	9	—	—	—	—	—
1980–81	Fort Worth Texans	CHL	23	8	7	15	2	5	1	3	4	4
1981–82	Wichita Wind	CHL	10	4	5	9	2	7	0	4	4	0
1981–82	Mannheimer ERC	GER	44	19	37	56	30	—	—	—	—	—
1982–83	Mannheimer ERC	GER	36	19	34	53	36	—	—	—	—	—
1983–84	Mannheimer ERC	GER	47	26	47	73	36	—	—	—	—	—
1984–85	Genève-Servette HC	NLB	40	38	33	71	—	—	—	—	—	—
1985–86	Kölner EC	GER	36	25	24	49	8	10	6	7	13	2
1986–87	Kölner EC	GER	33	11	38	49	28	9	8	12	20	10
1987–88	Kölner EC	GER	36	15	33	48	24	11	7	7	14	6
1988–89	Kölner EC	GER	29	9	23	32	23	9	1	4	5	6
1989–90	Kölner EC	GER	36	15	24	39	26	8	3	7	10	4
1990–91	Kölner EC	GER	44	13	40	53	39	14	3	8	11	6
1991–92	Kölner EC	GER	32	13	25	38	18	3	0	0	0	4
GER totals			373	165	325	490	268	64	28	45	73	38
WHA totals			29	6	3	9	4	—	—	—	—	—
NHL totals			121	10	33	43	25	—	—	—	—	—

== Awards and honors ==
Award	Year
All-WCHA First Team	1977–78
AHCA West All-American	1977–78
