= Tom Thornbury =

Canadian ice hockey defenceman

- Born: March 17, 1963 (age 62); Lindsay, Ontario, Canada
- Height: 5 ft 11 in (180 cm)
- Weight: 175 lb (79 kg; 12 st 7 lb)
- Position: Defenceman
- Shot: Right
- Played for: Pittsburgh Penguins; Kölner EC; Frankfurt Lions
- National team: Canada
- NHL draft: 49th overall, 1981; Pittsburgh Penguins
- Playing career: 1983–1996

Thomas Thornbury (born March 17, 1963) is a Canadian former professional ice hockey player. He played 14 games in the National Hockey League for the Pittsburgh Penguins during the 1983–84 season. The rest of his career, which lasted from 1983 to 1996, was spent in the minor leagues and then in the German Eishockey-Bundesliga. Thornbury was born in Lindsay, Ontario.

== Career statistics ==
=== Regular season and playoffs ===
			Regular season					Playoffs
Season	Team	League	GP	G	A	Pts	PIM	GP	G	A	Pts	PIM
1979–80	Aurora Tigers	OPJAHL	44	19	30	49	84	—	—	—	—	—
1980–81	Niagara Falls Flyers	OHL	60	15	22	37	138	12	1	5	6	31
1981–82	Niagara Falls Flyers	OHL	43	11	22	33	65	1	0	0	0	2
1982–83	Cornwall Royals	OHL	50	21	35	56	66	8	2	4	6	88
1982–83	North Bay Centennials	OHL	17	6	9	15	30	—	—	—	—	—
1983–84	Pittsburgh Penguins	NHL	14	1	8	9	16	—	—	—	—	—
1983–84	Baltimore Skipjacks	AHL	65	17	46	63	64	10	2	15	17	8
1984–85	Baltimore Skipjacks	AHL	22	4	12	16	21	—	—	—	—	—
1984–85	Fredericton Express	AHL	53	11	16	27	26	6	0	2	2	5
1985–86	Fredericton Express	AHL	24	0	15	15	30	—	—	—	—	—
1985–86	Muskegon Lumberjacks	IHL	9	0	8	8	8	—	—	—	—	—
1985–86	Moncton Golden Flames	AHL	40	6	12	18	38	7	0	2	2	8
1986–87	Kölner EC	GER	26	10	16	26	30	—	—	—	—	—
1987–88	Kölner EC	GER	35	6	14	20	60	11	4	9	13	22
1988–89	Kölner EC	GER	34	15	26	41	36	9	1	9	10	2
1989–90	Kölner EC	GER	36	12	16	28	38	8	2	2	4	12
1990–91	Kölner EC	GER	36	11	32	43	67	3	1	0	1	16
1991–92	Kölner EC	GER	31	14	15	29	62	3	0	0	0	5
1992–93	Frankfurter ESC	GER-3	51	51	64	115	144	—	—	—	—	—
1993–94	Frankfurter ESC	GER-2	34	10	8	18	71	4	0	0	0	4
1994–95	Oklahoma City Blazers	CHL	43	11	29	40	43	—	—	—	—	—
1995–96	Frankfurt Lions	DEL	5	0	1	1	10	3	0	1	1	0
1995–96	EHC Wolfsburg	GER-2	25	11	18	29	46	—	—	—	—	—
AHL totals			204	38	101	139	179	23	2	19	21	23
GER totals			198	68	119	187	293	34	8	20	28	57
NHL totals			14	1	8	9	16	—	—	—	—	—
