= Mirco Lüdemann =

German ice hockey player

Mirko Lüdemann
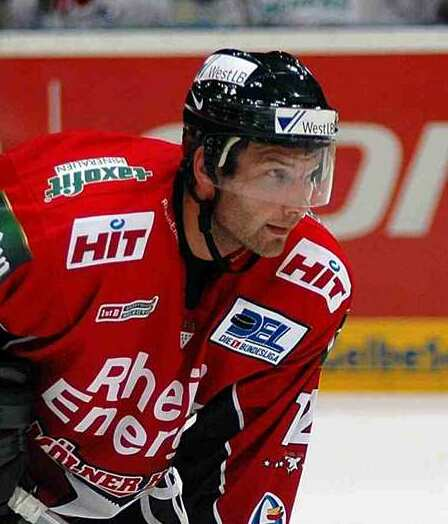
- Born: December 15, 1973 (age 52) Weißwasser, East Germany
- Height: 5 ft 11 in (180 cm)
- Weight: 183 lb (83 kg; 13 st 1 lb)
- Position: Defence
- Shot: Left
- Played for: Kölner Haie
- National team: Germany
- NHL draft: Undrafted
- Playing career: 1993–2016

Mirko Lüdemann (born December 15, 1973) is a German retired professional ice hockey defenceman.

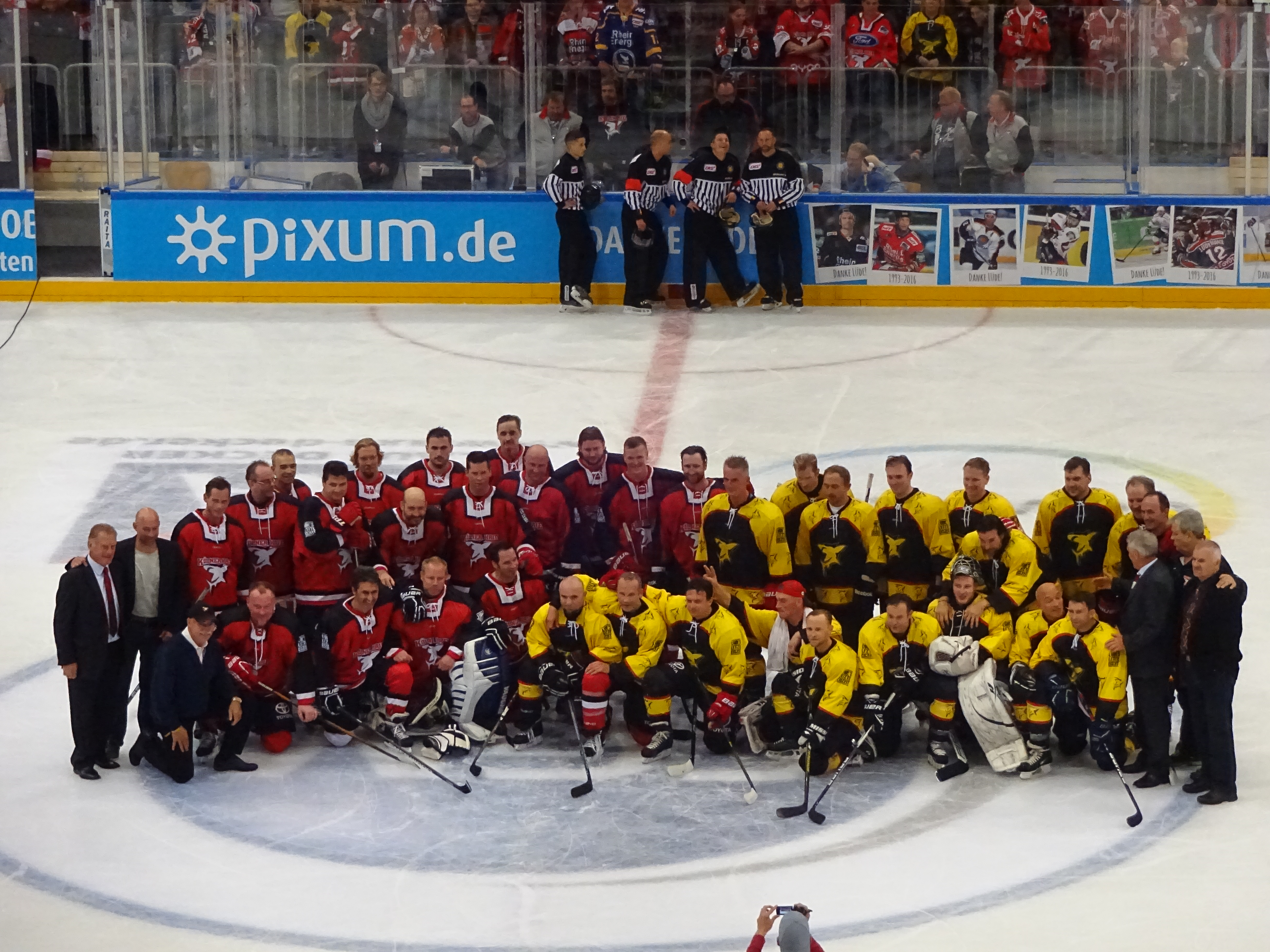
Participants of the Mirko Lüdemann testimonial 24 September 2016

== Career ==
A product of SG Dynamo Weißwasser, Lüdemann spent some time with the Fort McMurray Oil Barons of the Alberta Junior Hockey League in the early 1990s, before signing with Kölner Haie in 1993, where he enjoyed a record-breaking career.

He played 1197 league games for Kölner Haie over the span of his 23-year career, winning the German championship title in 1995 and 2002, the 1999 Spengler Cup and the 2004 German Cup competition. Lüdemann brought an end to his pro career after the 2015-16 season, retiring as the all-time leader in games played in the Deutsche Eishockey Liga (DEL).

He won a total of 132 caps for the German national team and went to the 1994, 1998 and 2002 Olympics. He also competed at seven World Championships.

On September 25, 2016, Lüdemann was honoured with a testimonial match in the Lanxess Arena, the home ice of the Kölner Haie, featuring several of his former teammates and opponents. He also had his jersey number 12 retired by the Cologne side that night.

Lüdemann joined the Kölner Haie front office after his career was over.

== Career statistics ==
=== Regular season and playoffs ===
			Regular season					Playoffs
Season	Team	League	GP	G	A	Pts	PIM	GP	G	A	Pts	PIM
1990–91	Fort McMurray Oil Barons	AJHL	—	—	—	—	—	—	—	—	—	—
1990–91	ES Weißwasser	DEU U20	8	2	6	8	6	—	—	—	—	—
1991–92	Fort McMurray Oil Barons	AJHL	—	—	—	—	—	—	—	—	—	—
1992–93	Fort McMurray Oil Barons	AJHL	—	—	—	—	—	—	—	—	—	—
1993–94	Kölner EC	1.GBun	38	5	7	12	14	5	0	2	2	4
1994–95	Kölner Haie	DEL	42	8	12	20	44	17	2	4	6	20
1995–96	Kölner Haie	DEL	44	7	27	34	30	12	1	1	2	12
1996–97	Kölner Haie	DEL	46	12	15	27	36	4	0	0	0	2
1997–98	Kölner Haie	DEL	39	8	13	21	34	3	0	0	0	6
1998–99	Kölner Haie	DEL	43	12	15	27	28	5	2	1	3	2
1999–2000	Kölner Haie	DEL	48	8	15	23	28	10	1	3	4	2
2000–01	Kölner Haie	DEL	43	4	16	20	18	3	0	0	0	0
2001–02	Kölner Haie	DEL	49	11	7	18	26	13	1	3	4	4
2002–03	Kölner Haie	DEL	40	7	19	26	34	15	6	1	7	10
2003–04	Kölner Haie	DEL	51	8	23	31	63	6	2	0	2	2
2004–05	Kölner Haie	DEL	52	8	16	24	28	7	0	4	4	6
2005–06	Kölner Haie	DEL	47	9	30	39	34	9	1	1	2	14
2006–07	Kölner Haie	DEL	45	15	19	34	26	9	1	5	6	4
2007–08	Kölner Haie	DEL	41	7	18	25	18	14	3	9	12	10
2008–09	Kölner Haie	DEL	49	8	12	20	18	—	—	—	—	—
2009–10	Kölner Haie	DEL	43	5	15	20	38	3	0	1	1	0
2010–11	Kölner Haie	DEL	49	3	18	21	18	5	0	2	2	0
2011–12	Kölner Haie	DEL	51	2	9	11	26	2	0	0	0	0
2012–13	Kölner Haie	DEL	45	4	6	10	12	12	0	2	2	4
2013–14	Kölner Haie	DEL	51	4	10	14	16	17	3	0	3	4
2014–15	Kölner Haie	DEL	50	0	6	6	14	—	—	—	—	—
2015–16	Kölner Haie	DEL	48	1	5	6	12	15	1	0	1	0
DEL totals			1016	151	326	477	601	181	24	37	61	102

=== International ===
Year	Team	Event	GP	G	A	Pts	PIM
1990	East Germany	EJC C	—	—	—	—	—
1991	Germany	EJC	5	0	1	1	0
1992	Germany	WJC	7	0	1	1	2
1993	Germany	WJC	7	0	0	0	6
1994	Germany	OG	4	0	0	0	0
1994	Germany	WC	5	0	0	0	2
1995	Germany	WC	5	0	3	3	0
1996	Germany	WC	6	1	0	1	2
1996	Germany	WCH	4	1	0	1	4
1997	Germany	OGQ	3	0	1	1	2
1997	Germany	WC	8	2	1	3	8
1998	Germany	OG	4	1	1	2	0
1999	Germany	WC B	7	0	0	0	4
2000	Germany	OGQ	3	1	1	2	2
2001	Germany	OGQ	3	1	1	2	4
2001	Germany	WC	7	0	1	1	2
2002	Germany	OG	4	0	1	1	0
2003	Germany	WC	6	0	5	5	2
2004	Germany	WC	6	0	0	0	6
2004	Germany	WCH	4	0	0	0	0
Junior totals			19	0	2	2	8
Senior totals			79	7	15	22	38
