= Niklas Sundblad =

Swedish ice hockey player and coach

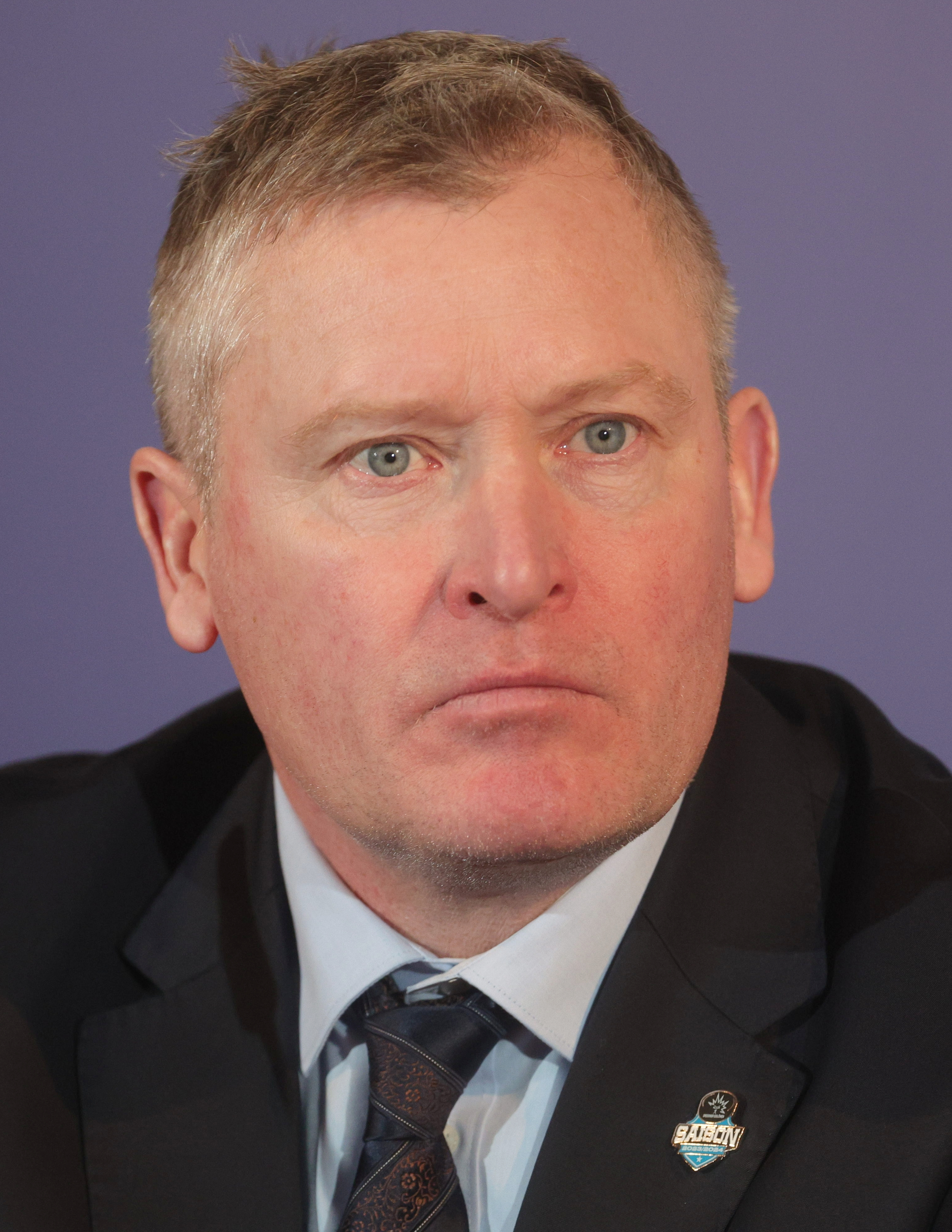
- Sundblad in 2024
- Born: January 3, 1973 (age 53) Stockholm, Sweden
- Height: 6 ft 2 in (188 cm)
- Weight: 203 lb (92 kg; 14 st 7 lb)
- Position: Right wing
- Shot: Right
- Played for: Calgary Flames
- National team: Sweden
- NHL draft: 19th overall, 1991; Calgary Flames
- Playing career: 1990–2009

Niklas Sundblad (born January 3, 1973) is a Swedish professional ice hockey coach and a former Swedish professional ice hockey player.

== Playing career ==
Sundblad started his career in the youth teams at AIK close to his native Stockholm. He made his debut in the Swedish top-flight SHL during the 1990–91 season. He was a first-round draft pick of the Calgary Flames, 19th overall, in the 1991 NHL entry draft.

He headed to North America before the 1993–94 season and spent two years with the Saint John Flames of the American Hockey League, then an affiliate of the Flames. He played two National Hockey League games for the Flames in the 1995–96 season while continuing to get playing time in the AHL. He then opted to return to Europe.

Sundblad spent two years with HC TPS in Finland's top-tier competition Liiga, which included capturing the European Hockey League title in 1997 and a trip to the Liiga finals the same year, followed by two years in the Swedish Hockey League (SHL) with the Malmö Redhawks. In 2000, he signed with Düsseldorfer EG of Germany, before joining local rivals Kölner Haie, where he played from 2001 to 2003, winning the 2002 German championship with the Haie squad.

Sundblad returned to the Malmö Redhawks for a second stint in 2003–04. He played for Füchse Duisburg in Germany from 2004 to 2006 and spent time in Italy and Japan in his later playing days.

In 2006–07, Sundblad played for HC Alleghe of the Italian Serie A. On October 7, 2008, he left Alleghe and moved back to Sweden. After four appearances for AIK in the 2008-09 campaign, Sundblad called it a career and turned to coaching.

== International career ==
Sundblad has represented his native Sweden several times in international competitions. He won silver medals in both 1992 and 1993 at the World Junior Hockey Championships, as well as another silver medal at the 1997 Ice Hockey World Championships.

== Coaching career ==
On October 22, 2008, Sundblad was named head coach of Herner EV, a minor league team in Germany. On December 3, 2009, he accepted a position as assistant coach with the Kölner Haie organization of the German elite league DEL. He served as head coach on an interim basis, when the club sacked Bill Stewart in November 2010, before returning to his role as assistant.

Sundblad left Köln after the 2012–13 season, taking up an offer from fellow DEL team ERC Ingolstadt where he became head coach. After finishing the 2013-14 regular season in 9th place, Sundblad directed his team to one of the most surprising playoff runs in DEL history, making it to the finals where they defeated Köln to give ERC its first ever German championship. Following the championship, Sundblad did not come to terms on a new contract with ERC and parted ways with the club.

In October 2014, Sundblad was named head coach of Kölner Haie to replace Uwe Krupp who he served under as an assistant coach during his earlier stint with the Haie organization. Köln were in 10th place in the DEL standings, when Sundblad was sacked on January 20, 2016.

On January 5, 2017, he took over the head coaching position at Örebro HK of the Swedish Hockey League (SHL). He was fired from the role on December 4, 2018.

== Personal ==
Sundblad is the father of two daughters, Jessica and Madeleine.

== Career statistics ==
=== Regular season and playoffs ===
			Regular season					Playoffs
Season	Team	League	GP	G	A	Pts	PIM	GP	G	A	Pts	PIM
1989–90	AIK	SWE U20	—	—	—	—	—	—	—	—	—	—
1990–91	AIK	SEL	39	1	3	4	14	—	—	—	—	—
1991–92	AIK	SEL	33	9	2	11	20	3	3	1	4	0
1992–93	AIK	SEL	22	5	4	9	54	—	—	—	—	—
1992–93	AIK	Allsv	18	4	5	9	42	2	1	1	2	2
1993–94	Saint John Flames	AHL	76	13	19	32	75	4	1	1	2	2
1994–95	Saint John Flames	AHL	72	9	5	14	151	2	0	0	0	6
1995–96	Calgary Flames	NHL	2	0	0	0	0	—	—	—	—	—
1995–96	Saint John Flames	AHL	74	16	20	36	66	16	0	4	4	14
1996–97	TPS	SM-l	50	15	21	36	93	11	2	2	4	24
1997–98	TPS	SM-l	47	17	16	33	68	4	0	0	0	6
1998–99	Malmö IF	SEL	43	21	12	33	104	8	1	1	2	12
1999–00	Malmö IF	SEL	47	22	10	32	75	6	2	2	4	6
2000–01	Düsseldorfer EG	DEL	59	22	22	44	54	—	—	—	—	—
2001–02	Kölner Haie	DEL	59	20	22	42	87	13	3	8	11	32
2002–03	Kölner Haie	DEL	52	7	11	18	30	15	0	1	1	8
2003–04	MIF Redhawks	SEL	50	1	5	6	110	—	—	—	—	—
2004–05	Füchse Duisburg	GER-2	49	14	21	35	76	12	0	5	5	10
2005–06	Füchse Duisburg	DEL	51	5	7	12	81	—	—	—	—	—
2006–07	HC Alleghe	ITA	32	15	19	34	40	18	12	11	23	36
2007–08	Nippon Paper Cranes	AL	10	1	1	2	8	—	—	—	—	—
2007–08	HC Alleghe	ITA	21	7	15	22	26	12	2	6	8	12
2008–09	AIK	SWE-2	4	0	1	1	4	—	—	—	—	—
NHL totals			2	0	0	0	0	—	—	—	—	—
SEL totals			234	59	36	95	377	17	6	4	10	18
DEL totals			221	54	62	116	252	28	3	9	12	40

=== International ===
Year	Team	Event	GP	G	A	Pts	PIM
1990	Sweden	EJC	6	3	5	8	20
1991	Sweden	EJC	5	4	1	5	38
1992	Sweden	WJC	7	2	3	5	10
1993	Sweden	WJC	7	0	3	3	10
1997	Sweden	WC	11	2	1	3	22
Junior totals			25	9	12	21	78
Senior totals			11	2	1	3	22

Preceded by Trevor Kidd	Calgary Flames' first-round draft pick 1991	Succeeded by Cory Stillman
