= BSC Preussen =

- City: Berlin, Germany
- League: Bundesliga (1987–1994); DEL (1994–2002)
- Founded: 1983
- Folded: 2005
- Home arena: Eissporthalle an der Jafféstraße (1983–2001); Deutschlandhalle (2001–2005)
- Colours

Franchise history
- 1983–1995: Berliner Schlittschuh-Club Preussen
- 1995–1996: Preussen Devils
- 1996–2002: Berlin Capitals
- 2002–2003: BC Preussen
- 2003–2004: Berlin Capitals
- 2004–2005: Berliner Schlittschuh-Club Preussen

BSC Preussen was an ice hockey team in Berlin, Germany, that existed between 1983 and 2005. They played in the highest German league from 1987 to 2001, reaching the playoff semifinals on seven occasions.

== History ==
BSC Preussen was founded in 1983 in West Berlin. by the ice hockey sections of Berliner Schlittschuhclub and BFC Preussen. The ice hockey section of Berliner SC had split from the main club in 1981 and folded just a year later. BFC Preussen had won promotion to the 2nd Bundesliga in 1983. BSC Preussen thus started out playing in the 2nd Bundesliga in 1983–84, and won promotion to the Bundesliga for the 1987–88 season.

When the Deutsche Eishockey Liga replaced the Bundesliga in 1994, BSC Preussen continued playing there. In 1995–96 they played as Preussen Devils before changing their name to Berlin Capitals for the following season. The club was relegated in 2002. Due to financial difficulties, the club immediately dropped to the Regionalliga, the fourth level of German ice hockey. After just one season, BC Preussen won promotion to the Oberliga where they played the 2003–04 season. Due to renewed financial problems, the club entered a cooperation with Berliner Schlittschuhclub in 2004 and played the 2004–05 Oberliga season as BSC Preussen, before folding due to bankruptcy.

A successor club was formed in 2004, the Eishockey-Club Charlottenburg Preussen Juniors Berlin (ECC Preussen Juniors Berlin), renamed to ECC Preussen Berlin in 2012. They won the Regionalliga multiple times, played several seasons in the Oberliga and folded after bankruptcy in 2020.

== Season-by-season ==
Name	Season	League	Tier	Regular season	Postseason	
BSC Preussen	1983–84	2. Bundesliga	2	1st (North)	1st (group phase)	5th in relegation/promotion playoffs (not promoted)
BSC Preussen	1984–85	2. Bundesliga	2	1st (North)	3rd in relegation/promotion playoffs (not promoted)	
BSC Preussen	1985–86	2. Bundesliga	2	1st (North)	4th in relegation/promotion playoffs (not promoted)	
BSC Preussen	1986–87	2. Bundesliga	2	1st (North)	1st in relegation/promotion playoffs (promoted)	
BSC Preussen	1987–88	Bundesliga	1	9th	1st in relegation/promotion playoffs (not relegated)	
BSC Preussen	1988–89	Bundesliga	1	6th	lost quarterfinal to Mannheimer ERC	
BSC Preussen	1989–90	Bundesliga	1	4th	lost quarterfinal to Schwenninger ERC	
BSC Preussen	1990–91	Bundesliga	1	4th	lost semifinal to Kölner EC	
BSC Preussen	1991–92	Bundesliga	1	4th	lost semifinal to SB Rosenheim	
BSC Preussen	1992–93	Bundesliga	1	6th	lost semifinal to Düsseldorfer EG	
BSC Preussen	1993–94	Bundesliga	1	6th	lost semifinal to Düsseldorfer EG	
BSC Preussen	1994–95	DEL	1	1st	lost semifinal to Kölner Haie	
Preussen Devils	1995–96	DEL	1	2nd	lost semifinal to Düsseldorfer EG	
Berlin Capitals	1996–97	DEL	1	3rd	3rd (Meisterrunde)	lost quartfinal to Eisbären Berlin
Berlin Capitals	1997–98	DEL	1	10th	2nd (qualification round)	lost quartfinal to Augsburger Panther
Berlin Capitals	1998–99	DEL	1	13th	missed play-offs	
Berlin Capitals	1999–2000	DEL	1	6th	lost semifinal to Kölner Haie	
Berlin Capitals	2000–01	DEL	1	8th	lost quartfinal to Adler Mannheim	
Berlin Capitals	2000–01	DEL	1	15th	lost playdown to Schwenninger ERC Wild Wings (relegated)	
BC Preussen	2002–03	Regionalliga	4	1st (East)	1st in the North/East final round (promoted)	
Berlin Capitals	2003–04	Oberliga	3	7th (North-East)	8th in the relegation playoffs (not relegated)	
BSC Preussen	2004–05	Oberliga	3	2nd (North-East)	1st (group phase)	lost quarterfinal to EC Hannover Indians
