= 1978–79 ice hockey Bundesliga season =

German ice hockey season

The 1978–79 Ice hockey Bundesliga season was the 21st season of the Ice hockey Bundesliga, the top level of ice hockey in Germany. 12 teams participated in the league, and Kolner EC won the championship.

== First round ==
	Club	Gp	W	T	L	GF–GA	Pts
1.	Kölner EC	22	16	1	5	128:76	33:11
2.	Düsseldorfer EG	22				107:73	32:12
3.	SC Riessersee (M)	22				140:98	28:16
4.	Mannheimer ERC (N)	22				94:91	27:17
5.	Berliner SC	22				129:99	26:18
6.	VfL Bad Nauheim	22	10	4	8	102:94	24:20
7.	SB Rosenheim	22				99:90	23:21
8.	EV Landshut	22				95:90	21:23
9.	EV Füssen	22				84:113	16:28
10.	Augsburger EV (N)	22				75:119	14:30
11.	EC Deilinghofen	22	6	1	15	71:116	13:31
12.	ESV Kaufbeuren (N)	22				70:135	7:37

== Final round ==
	Club	Gp	W	T	L	GF–GA	Pts
1.	Kölner EC	52	36	3	13	325:215	75:29
2.	SC Riessersee (M)	52	30	4	18	313:248	64:40
3.	Berliner SC	52	23	10	19	287:261	56:48
4.	Düsseldorfer EG	52	26	3	23	248:238	55:49
5.	VfL Bad Nauheim	52	23	5	24	240:257	51:53
6.	Mannheimer ERC (N)	52	22	5	25	218:243	49:55

== Relegation ==
	Club	Gp	W	T	L	GF–GA	Pts
1.	EV Landshut	52	33	5	14	283:173	71:33
2.	SB Rosenheim	52	28	5	19	248:212	61:43
3.	EC Deilinghofen	52	19	5	28	200:238	43:61
4.	EV Füssen	52	18	6	28	223:265	42:62
5.	ESV Kaufbeuren (N)	52	13	6	33	178:285	32:72
6.	Augsburger EV (N)	52	11	3	38	175:303	25:79
