= 1976–77 ice hockey Bundesliga season =

German ice hockey season

The 1976–77 Ice hockey Bundesliga season was the 19th season of the Ice hockey Bundesliga, the top level of ice hockey in Germany. 10 teams participated in the league, and Kolner EC won the championship.

== First round ==
	Club	Gp	W	T	L	GF–GA	Pts
1.	Kölner EC	36	26	1	9	219:100	53:19
2.	Krefelder EV	36	24	2	10	177:133	50:22
3.	Düsseldorfer EG	36	21	2	13	153:127	44:28
4.	Berliner SC (M)	36	19	4	13	156:126	42:30
5.	VfL Bad Nauheim	36	20	0	16	143:135	40:32
6.	EV Landshut	36	16	3	17	140:132	35:37
7.	SC Riessersee	36	15	2	19	140:157	32:40
8.	EV Füssen	36	10	6	20	102:160	26:46
9.	EV Rosenheim	36	8	3	25	105:181	19:53
10.	Augsburger EV (N)	36	7	5	24	124:208	19:53

== Final round ==
	Club	Gp	W	T	L	GF–GA	Pts
1.	Kölner EC	46	32	3	11	272:132	67:25
2.	Krefelder EV	46	28	3	15	225:176	59:33
3.	EV Landshut	46	24	4	18	184:155	52:40
4.	Düsseldorfer EG	46	24	3	19	194:185	51:41
5.	Berliner SC (M)	46	22	5	19	186:163	49:43
6.	VfL Bad Nauheim	46	23	0	23	177:192	46:46

== Relegation ==
	Club	Gp	W	T	L	GF–GA	Pts
1.	SC Riessersee	48	23	3	22	204:203	49:47
2.	EV Füssen	48	14	6	28	140:214	34:62
3.	EV Rosenheim	48	13	5	30	150:224	31:65
4.	Augsburger EV (N)	48	12	6	30	167:255	30:66
