= 2001–02 DEL season =

2001–02 Deutsche Eishockey Liga season
- League: Deutsche Eishockey Liga
- Sport: Ice Hockey
- Teams: 16

2001–02
- Season champions: Kölner Haie

DEL seasons
- ← 2000–01 2002–03 →

The 2001–02 Deutsche Eishockey Liga season was the 8th season since the founding of the Deutsche Eishockey Liga (English: German Ice Hockey League). The league also introduced a new logo, that will stay in use until the 2011-2012 season.

The Kölner Haie won the DEL Championship the second time in their history, making it the eighth time they held the German Champion title.

Relegation was reintroduced for this season and after a playdown the Berlin Capitals were relegated to the 2nd Bundesliga. This would not be the only teams leaving the league, as the DEL withdrew the license for the Moskitos Essen and Revierlöwen Oberhausen. The Revierlöwen Oberhausen were not able to provide an DEL-sized arena and the Moskitos Essen were insolvent.

== Regular season ==
The first 8 placed teams qualified for the playoffs. The last two were heading for a playdown series to determine the team to relegate.

	Team	GP	W	SOW	SOL	L	GF:GA	Points
1.	München Barons	60	33	10	2	15	182:138	121
2.	Adler Mannheim	60	34	6	6	14	186:135	120
3.	Krefeld Pinguine	60	34	6	4	16	210:162	118
4.	Nürnberg Ice Tigers	60	31	7	4	18	180:134	111
5.	Kassel Huskies	60	26	6	8	20	157:147	98
6.	Kölner Haie	60	27	3	6	24	173:153	93
7.	Eisbären Berlin	60	25	6	5	24	177:166	92
8.	Augsburger Panther	60	23	8	6	23	185:189	91
9.	DEG Metro Stars	60	23	8	3	26	143:139	88
10.	Hannover Scorpions	60	21	4	7	28	180:201	78
11.	Frankfurt Lions	60	20	7	2	31	156:199	76
12.	Iserlohn Roosters	60	19	4	9	28	154:183	74
13.	Revierlöwen Oberhausen	60	18	5	6	31	168:187	70
14.	Moskitos Essen	60	18	3	8	31	163:195	68
15.	Berlin Capitals	60	19	6	5	30	168:205	68
16.	Schwenninger ERC Wild Wings	60	18	2	10	30	134:183	68

GP = Games played, W = Win, SOW = Shootout Win, SOL = Shootout loss, L = Loss
= Qualified for playoffs = Season ended = Relegation playdown

== Playdown ==
The two last placed, Berlin Capitals and Schwenninger Wild Wings played a playdown best-of-seven series to determine who will be relegated.

			Game	1	2	3	4	5	6	7
Berlin Capitals	–	Schwenninger Wild Wings	3:4	0:5	2:1	6:3	1:5	3:2	1:4	5:7

The Berlin Capitals were to be relegated. Irrespective of their misfortunes on the ice, they would not have been able to join the DEL for the next season, as the league withdrew their license for non-compliance with the regulations.

== Playoff ==
The playoffs were played in a best-of-five mode.

Quarterfinals
1	München Barons	3
8	Augsburg Panther	1
3	Krefeld Pinguine	0
6	Kölner Haie	3
2	Adler Mannheim	3
7	Eisbären Berlin	1
4	Nürnberg Ice Tigers	1
5	Kassel Huskies	3

Semifinals
1	München Barons	2
6	Kölner Haie	3
2	Adler Mannheim	3
5	Kassel Huskies	0

Finals
2	Adler Mannheim	2
6	Kölner Haie	3

=== Quarterfinals ===
Quarterfinals started on March 22, 2002 with the bestplaced München Barons playing the 8th placed Augsburger Panther; secondplaced Adler Mannheim playing 7th placed Eisbären Berlin; thirdplaced Krefeld Pinguine playing 6th placed Kölner Haie. A curiosity were the 4th placed Nürnberg Ice Tigers playing the 5th placed Kassel Huskies, as this was the same as in the previous season.

			Game	1	2	3	4	5
München Barons	–	Augsburger Panther	3:1	5:6	2:1	4:2	5:1	–
Adler Mannheim	–	Eisbären Berlin	3:1	2:3	3:2	4:3	3:1	–
Krefeld Pinguine	–	Kölner Haie	0:3	1:2	3:4	2:4	–	–
Nürnberg Ice Tigers	–	Kassel Huskies	1:3	0:4	2:3	3:2	0:3	–

OT = Overtime; SO = Shootout

=== Semifinals ===
The semifinals started April 1.

			Game	1	2	3	4	5
München Barons	–	Kölner Haie	2:3	2:1	2:3	3:4	5:2	1:2
Adler Mannheim	–	Kassel Huskies	3:0	5:4	3:2	2:0	–	–

OT = Overtime; SO = Shootout

=== Finals ===
The finals started April 12 with Adler Mannheim playing the first game home due to better regular season placement.

			Game	1	2	3	4	5
Kölner Haie	–	Adler Mannheim	3:2	0:4	3:2	4:2	1:3	2:1

OT = Overtime; SO = Shootout

The Kölner Haie were DEL Champions for the 2nd time and held the German Champion title for the 8th time in their club history.
