= Ratinger Löwen =

Ratinger Lowen
- City: Ratingen, Germany
- League: Deutsche Eishockey Liga
- Founded: 1979
- Operated: 1979 - 1997
- Colours: Red, White, Black

Ratinger Lowen was an ice hockey team in Ratingen, Germany founded in 1979. They played in the Deutsche Eishockey Liga from 1994-1997.

== History ==
Ratinger played in the Regionalliga for the 1984-85 season, which they promptly won, and were promoted to the Oberliga. They won the Oberliga two years later, and were promoted to the 2nd Bundesliga. Ratinger was promoted to the 1.Bundesliga after a second-place finish in the 2.Bundesliga. When the 1.Bundesliga became the Deutsche Eishockey Liga in 1994, Ratinger continued playing there until they folded in 1997.

A successor club, Revierlöwen Oberhausen, was founded in 1997 and operated until 2007.

== Season-by-season record ==
Season	League	First round	Final round/ Play-offs
1984-85	Regionalliga	1st place	1st place^{↑}
1985-86	Oberliga	2nd place	4th place^{↑}
1986-87	Oberliga	1st place	6th place^{↑}
1987-88	2nd Bundesliga	5th place	9th place^{↑}
1988-89	2. Bundesliga	6th place	5th place^{↓}
1989-90	2. Bundesliga	8th place	1st place^{↓}
1990-91	2. Bundesliga	4th place	8th place^{↑}
1991-92	2. Bundesliga	2nd place^{↑}	
1992-93	Bundesliga	8th place	Quarterfinal^{↑}
1993-94	Bundesliga	8th place	2nd round^{↓}
1994-95	DEL	16th place	1/8 Final^{↑}
1995-96	DEL	10th place	1/8 Final^{↑}
1996-97	DEL	10th place^{↓}	Relegation^{↓}
