= Kölner Haie =

- Nickname: Sharks
- City: Cologne, Germany
- League: Deutsche Eishockey Liga
- Founded: 1972; 54 years ago
- Home arena: Lanxess Arena (capacity: 18,600)
- Colours
- Owner: Frank Gotthardt
- General manager: Philipp Walter
- Head coach: Kari Jalonen
- Captain: Moritz Müller
- Website: haie.de

Franchise history
- 1972–1995: Kölner EC
- 1995–present: Kölner Haie

Championships
- Playoff championships: 8 (1977, 1979, 1984, 1986, 1987, 1988, 1995, 2002)

The Kölner Haie (English: Cologne Sharks) are an ice hockey club based in Cologne, Germany, that plays in the professional Deutsche Eishockey Liga (DEL). The team was one of the founding members of the DEL.

The Kölner Haie play their home games in the DEL and the German Cup (DEB-Pokal) at the Lanxess Arena, which opened in 1998, located in the district Deutz. With room for 18,600 spectators, Lanxess Arena is amongst the biggest multi-functional arenas in Europe, and the Kölner Haie have the highest average attendance in European ice hockey before Swiss team SC Bern. Previously, the Kölner Haie played their home games at the Eisstadion an der Lentstraße. A strong local rivalry exists between the Kölner Haie and the Düsseldorfer EG, of neighboring Düsseldorf. Games between the two teams often sell out.

== History ==
=== 1972 to 1976: Founding of Kölner EC ===
In the summer of 1972, the hockey department of the Kölner EK (KEK), which had made hockey in Cologne possible for different lower classes since 1936, separated from its parent association. The members of the hockey department sought to play as an independent association, due to the freedom of choice and better financial possibilities. On 10 August 1972, the independence of the hockey department was established, and Peter Rentergent was appointed the president of the new Kölner Eishockey Club (KEC).

The KEC remained associated with KEK, but as an independent department, and the team began play directly in the second division, then called the Oberliga. The KEK was a member of the German Ice Hockey Federation, granting them access to this division. The new association was to be called Kölner EC – but to no avail, however, because of the resemblance to the Kölner EK name. Hence, the addition "Sharks" was added to the logo, and years later, the association name. In the first logo, artist and team goaltender Dieter Horký sketched the shark logo. Today, the shark is the unmistakable brand image of the club, and since 1995, officially part of the club name.

The team found immediate success in their first season, 1972-73. With top players like Detlef Langemann, Wilhelm Hospelt, and player-manager Günter Peter, the team dominated opponents en route to winning the Oberliga, while being coached by Ondrej Bendik. The KEC scored 251 goals in 30 games to handily claim the Oberliga title, and gain promotion to the top hockey league, Eishockey-Bundesliga, for their second season. In their first Bundesliga season, 1973-74, there was a fair number of problems in and around the team. These problems compounded when captain Sigbert Stotz was forced to retire due to injury, furthering problems within the board of directors. Team manager Peter, plagued with financial troubles, fled the city, and the team ultimately finished the season in 8th place out of 10.

In the off-season, KEC fired head coach Jiri Hanzl, and rehired Ondrej Bendík to the team. The 1974-75 season saw a jump in performance by KEC; while only finishing one spot higher in the final standings, 7th, the team was closer to a .500 winning percentage. 1975-76 saw sparks fly in the Sharks front office, as at the beginning of the season, team president Rentergent resigned after coming under fire due to mismanagement of KEC's amateur star players. To add to this, in the middle of the season, head coach Bendík was dismissed due to poor performance – the team's attendance strongly decreased, leading to a financial deficit for KEC.

=== 1976 to 1983: first successes ===
Despite the financial issues following the Sharks, they made a splash with a big transfer. New team president Jochem Erlemann welcomed in Gerhard Kiessling as head coach, with his son Udo joining on defense. However, the purchase of Erich Kühnhackl from EV Landshut for a record transfer fee at that time of more than 600,000 DM, was even more spectacular. This deal came with its fair share of oddities: multiple times, Jochem Erlemann had sent employees to Landshut with cash to negotiate directly with Kühnhackl, which was ultimately unsuccessful, however, the star player still changed sides to Cologne in the end. Though, even as KEC established itself in the top league, additional tax payments and debts emerged at a rate of more than two million DM. Only by immediate measures did the association president succeed in avoiding bankruptcy while maintaining the upward trend of the club. Thus, the Sharks, in March 1977, were able to win their first championship, beating the former champions Eisbären Berlin, as well as the Rhenish rivals from Düsseldorfer EG and Krefeld Pinguine in the championship rounds.

After KEC did not manage to defend their title the next season, the president signed many new players; among them, Miroslav Sikora who would remain for the following 20 years as a player and manager in Cologne. Also, Gerhard Kiessling, head coach in 1977, returned to the Sharks, after he had been dismissed unexpectedly immediately after the first championship. The Sharks, in the next season, managed to achieve their second championship, which was overshadowed by the resignation of the team president. Heinz Landen was appointed as successor to Jochem Erlemann, while Clemens Vedder became the treasurer.

The next several seasons brought a period of mediocrity, as well as financial consolidation of the club. In the 1980-81 season, KEC became entangled in a passport forgery scandal involving applications of Canadian and American players to be registered as German players. As punishment, the Haie were moved into the relegation round. Additionally, on 9 March 1981, KEC was involved in a mass brawl in a Bundesliga match against VfL Bad Nauheim. The referees dealt out game misconducts, major and minor penalties, accruing a total of 166 penalty minutes.

Through 1983, the club formed a team with new players including Miroslav Sikora, Gerd Truntschka, Uwe Krupp and Helmut de Raaf, as well as experienced players such as Udo Kiessling and Uli Hiemer.

=== 1983 to 1988: four championships in five years ===
With Jozef Golonka, an experienced trainer was found, who led the team to the finale of the playoff round where KEC faced EV Landshut. The sharks defeated Landshut with a 5-0 score in the fifth and determining match, celebrating another German championship.

A year later the Sharks begun once more as favorites but had to be content with third place in the end. Due to injury the club lined up in the semi-final against Mannheim ERC with only eleven healthy players. The season, nevertheless, was overshadowed by the penalty against Mannheim's Roy Roedger, who highsticked the KEC forward Steve McNeill in the right eye area. Only thanks to several operations, was part of McNeill's vision saved. Roedger was suspended several matche and was ordered to make a compensation payment of 200,000 DM. Moreover, the Shark forward Peter Schiller provided a sensational moment, when in the European Cup play against Bolzano HC which KEC won 6-1, went from boredom with the puck behind own gate and made push-ups.

The 1985/86 season, the first time in which the former Shark player Hardy Nilsson stood as a coach on the Cologne bench, became one of the most successful eras in KEC history. From the beginning, the team dominated the league and went as a heavy favourite into the playoffs. There they lost only one match, winning the deciding final match against Düsseldorf EC with a 3-0 score to celebrate a championship once more. Before that the club had already finished second in the European Cup. However, the season was also marked by tragedy for the Sharks: 19-year-old Ralph Philipp, nephew of the long-standing KEC forward Rainer Philipp, died in a car accident. Since then the jersey number 8 which the young prospect had inherited from his uncle any more has been taken out of use.

In the 1986/87 season KEC, for the first time since the introduction of the playoffs, succeeded with defending its title. In the playoffs where they entered in the qualifying round, the Sharks went undefeated, and beat Schwenningen, DEG and Mannheim in three matches in each case. Before the season, Clemens Vedder had stepped down as treasurer for personal reasons. A year later, the Sharks made it three championship wins in a row when they won the fifth determining match 4-1 in the against Rosenheim. With this, they defeated the team placed ahead of it in the qualifying round. At the beginning of the playoffs, KEC set a record unequalled to this day: including three victories each against Frankfurt and Mannheim, the team won 20 playoff matches in a row.

=== 1988 to 1994: the Rhine rivals ===
After three straight titles, the Sharks were seen as favorites in the 1988/89 season. After claiming the vice title in the European Cup, nevertheless, the team from Cologne exited in the championship semi-final against DEG. The Sharks traded goalkeepers with DEG before the season (Joseph "Peppi" Heiss in exchange for Helmut de Raaf), besides, during the season the changes were announced by Dieter Hegen and Gerd Truntschka to the Rhine rival. In the 1989/90 season everything seemed to point again to another duel between the Rhenish rivals. The Sharks clinched at the end of the qualifying round second place behind DEG. KEC lost in the semi-final against Rosenheim. What remained was a record existing still today: nine wins in succession.

In the following season not everything went as hoped with the Sharks. In 1990/91 the team dealt with many injuries, however, the qualification for the playoffs still resulted in them being a front runner. They earned victories against Hedos München and BSC Preussen to reach the finale against DEG. KEC was defeated in the determining fifth match with an 0-4 score. In 1991/92, when the 19-year-old Jozef Stümpel began his international career, riots in the city were the beginning of further problems. The anticipated replacement of the ice arena was rejected first by the city. Shortly after the start of the season, NHL forward Ray Whitney barely spent any time with the Sharks before returning to North America. After a difficult start to the season, coach Nilsson came under fire and after the elimination in the quarterfinal against Mannheim, a power struggle began behind the scenes which culminated in resignations of several board members.

In the 1992/93 season the Kölner Haie again experienced financial bottlenecks. In spite of some departures of players, the team reached second place after the qualifying round. In the playoffs, KEC asserted himself first against Kaufbeuren (3-0) and Mannheim (3-1), before another matchup with DEG in the finals. In one of the most exciting final series of Bundesliga history, the determining fifth game was won by DEG in Brehmstrasse in Düsseldorf by a 2-1 score in overtime.

The financial problems of the Sharks worsened when the team president Landing suffered a heart attack shortly after end of the season and fell into a coma. The vice president who had been appointed shortly before became responsible for nearly seven million DM of debt; player's salaries were only partially paid at this point. Landing announced his resignation at the end of the 1993/94 season. Bernd Schäfer became interim president of the club. In spite of the troubles with the board of directors KEC qualified fifth for the playoffs, where it was defeated in the semi-final by the eventual champions Hedos München.

=== 1994 to 2001: new league, new arena ===
After the foundation of the Deutsche Eishockey Liga (DEL), in which clubs might also organise as corporations (GmbHs), Heinz Hermann Göttsch assumed the title of principal partner and chairman of the board of the new Cologne hockey association, "The Sharks" Ltd. By extensive consolidation measures and generous donations from the fan associations, the Sharks succeeded in bringing some top-calibre professionals to the Rhine. After another disappointing qualifying round which KEC finished in sixth place, the team stepped up its play in the playoffs to shut down Kaufbeuren, Mannheim and BSC Preussen Berlin. Finally, in the final series KEC defeated eV Landshut in the determining fifth game 4-0, celebrating its first-ever DEL title.

In 1995/96, the club, after finishing first after the qualifying round, reached the finale once more where it once again met against DEG. However, after the first match KEC could not achieve another victory, finishing as runners-up. The Sharks reached the final in the European Cup, losing against Jokerit Helsinki only after penalty shots in December 1995. A year later, the team had strongly been changed by the Bosman decision, being less successful in the new European Hockey League (EHL) with a defeat in the group phase. In the DEL Playoffs the team faced off against Landshut. This time, the Bavarians won the quarter0final series in four games.

The two teams met again a year later in the quarterfinal. Nevertheless, the Sharks, after a streaky qualifying round with a lot of restlessness in the team and in the city, were swept by Landshutin the series. The next season, the Sharks moved in October 1998 to the just-finished LANXESS (till 2008 "Kölnarena") arena; but even with the new home, there were many problems with the KEC from the beginning. As with the year before, players were dismissed shortly after the start of the season, the team's structure was problematic, and the achievements of the team stagnated. Only when coach Lahtinen, assistant coach Helland and manager Miro Sikora were replaced, and future NHL coach Andy Murray was hired, was there more stability for the organisation and on the team. In the playoffs, the Sharks eliminated the Lions after five games in the quarterfinal against Frankfurt.

In the 1999/2000 season the Sharks, according to many experts, was regarded as one of the best ones of recent years in German hockey. Everything went as desired at first: in December the team reached first place, and became the first German team after 35 years to win top position for the Spengler Cup in Davos. After the qualifying playoffs round, they beat the Augsburg Panthers and Berlin Capitals without a loss. However, in the finale against the Munich Barons the Sharks lost the next three matches after winning the first one, handing the Barons the title. A year later, Hannover played a significant role in affecting the direction of the Sharks: In January Bob Leslie was removed for the second time as head coach after a defeat against the Scorpions, by Lance Nethery. On one of the last games of the season, KEC qualified for the playoffs with a victory against Hannover, after being threatened with missing them for the first time. In the playoffs KEC lost in the quarterfinal against Scorpions in three games.

=== 2001 to 2006: successful years and the Zach era ===
The Sharks played a weak qualifying round again in the 2001/02 season. During the 30-year-old association anniversary season, the Sharks again made a run to the finals. There the Sharks met the Krefeld Penguins, sweeping them in three matches. In the semi-final KEC defeated the Munich Barons in five matches. It took five more matches to decide the finale against the Mannheim Eagles. KEC won the title 2-1 with goals from Alex Hicks and Dwayne Norris, gaining its eighth German championship. The coaching tenure of Hans Zach began with a title defence for Cologne. Before the start of the season, the national team coach was hired after Rich Chernomaz, in spite of the championship title just won, was not guaranteed a future in Cologne. The Sharks already were convincing in the qualifying round which they finished after a final burst to finish the season (20 undefeated games after regulation time) in second place. This time, after beating Kassel and Mannheim KEC reached the finals once more, against their Rhenish rivals from Krefeld. After the team had lost the first two games, the team battled back to force the determining fifth game in the Cologne arena in which, nevertheless, Krefeld defeated the Sharks 3-1. Besides the runner-up finish, Cologne reached the finale of the DEB Cup which they lost, however, against Mannheim.

After the successful previous years, the Sharks were again seen as the favorites for the DEL title in 2003/04. After the cup victory in 2004 against Kassel and reaching fourth place after the qualifying round, one expected a lot from KEC. However, due to many injuries in the course of the season, the afflicted Sharks could not recover in the quarterfinal series against the Frankfurt Lions, falling to the eventual German champions. Many highlights from the season still remained, with the new club record of 6,500 season ticket sales as well as the foundation of the Alex Hicks initiative by the Shark forward. A year later, Rodion Pauels had become a sports co-ordinator for the Sharks. After another season with many long-term injured players, the Sharks reached fourth place. In the playoffs the Sharks came up against a ERC Ingolstadt team reinforced by NHL players due to their league lockout; in the determining seventh game they suffered a 2-5 loss in the Cologne arena.

The 2005/06 season marked ten years for KEC making an appearance in the playoffs. After the Sharks had finished the qualifying round in fifth place and beat the Nürnberg Ice Tigers in only four games, the semi-final series followed against DEG. In the fourth game, the Sharks led shortly before the end of regulation, when Bill Lindsay scored to ensure overtime, where he also scored the winning goal. Nevertheless, in the determining game on Brehmerstrasse, the Sharks were defeated 3-5, exiting in the semi-final.

=== 2006 to present ===
In the 2006/07 season KEC reached the semi-final round. In the first year under new coach Doug Mason, Cologne experienced various highs and lows, finishing the qualifying round in fifth place, marking 26 straight years that it had made the playoffs. In the cup finale the Sharks, like in 2003, lost to Mannheim in overtime. Cologne did win the quarterfinal against Ingolstadt who finished ahead of them after the qualifying round, but were defeated in the semi-final against the eventual champions Mannheim. During the following season, there was a significant goaltending change with the Sharks: Travis Scott – up to that point statistically the best goaltender in the league – received a highly lucrative offer from a Russian club and transferred there within days. Cologne signed the German national goaltender Robert Müller from Mannheim. This led KEC to the finale where they were defeated, however, by Berlin in a 1-3 series. Before this, the Sharks had defeated defending champions Mannheim in the quarterfinal, as well as the Frankfurt Lions in the semi-final. In the third game of the series against Mannheim, both teams nearly set a new world record. Only after 168 minutes of play did Philip Gogulla succeed in scoring the winning goal in the sixth overtime period.

During the summer break in 2008 there was some restlessness with KEC; forward Ivan Čiernik signed in the KHL with HK Sibir Nowosibirsk, supposedly because he had been criticised by coach Doug Mason. To replace Čiernik, ex-NHL player Mike Johnson, whose contract was previously terminated in December 2008, was resigned thanks to his connection with Shark and former NHL teammate Todd Warriner. After seven straight losses to start the season – the worst start in club history – coach Doug Mason was dismissed. To replace Mason, management hired former assistant coach Clayton Beddoes. In December 2008 the Sharks parted ways with Beddoes and the promising coach Rupert Meister was brought on as an interim coach until the end of the season. Nevertheless, the team did not reach the playoffs in 2008/09, the first time in 28 years. On account of the weak performance and the global economic crisis the Sharks found themselves in severe financial difficulties. KEC faced further controversy when it applied for short-term unemployment assistance funds for its office employees in the spring of 2009. Only by the engagement of new companions the insolvency procedure could be prevented.

On 21 May 2009 the Sharks announced goaltender Robert Müller had died of cancer. As a result, Müller's number 80 was retired with the Sharks. After the Sharks fell in the qualifying round of the playoffs in 2009/10 and lost a large number of players, head coach Igor Pawlow and assistant Rupert Meister were released on 2 December 2009 from their duties. They were replaced by Bill Stewart and ex-Shark player Niklas Sundblad. Nevertheless, during the season it was not clear whether the Sharks could continue play for the rest of the season on account of continued deterioration of the club's financial situation. After there was no application for insolvency for the time being, the club reached the first playoff round, losing to Ingolstadt ERC.

With the worsening financial problems, the summer break in 2010 became a test of patience for Cologne fans. Alleingesellschafter Heinz Hermann Göttsch had got out. He had pumped more than 17 years 30 million euros into the association. Nearly every day, announcements in the press about a forthcoming "path to the district court" or failed negotiations with potential new sponsors circulated. After the LanxessArena proposed negotiating a new contract with the club, Thomas Eichin could announce on 31 May that the club submitted a licence application to the DEL. However, things were far from resolved, because a finance gap of about one million euros remained, to be satisfied within the five-day extension put forth by the DEL. On 8 June 2010, finally, there came the releasing announcement: „Future of the sharks securely!" The management succeeded in bringing together a group of private investors to save the club.

In November 2010 KEC sat at the bottom of the standings again, and dismissed Stewart. Niklas Sundblad was temporarily promoted to the head coach post, and new assistant Jan Broer joined Eichin on the bench. National team coach Uwe Krupp was signed to become head coach and sporting manager for the 2011/2012 season. The Sharks reached the playoffs with a 1-0 victory in Iserlohn on the next-to-last day of the regular season. Nevertheless, after two victories against the promoted team EHC München, the team lost all three games in its series against the Grizzly Adams Wolfsburg in the quarterfinals. The next year, the Sharks survived with a lineup with only five foreign players, however, it made it out of the qualifying round with two victories against Augsburg, but was eliminated without a win in the quarterfinals against the eventual champions Berlin.

On 8 November 2012, an all-star game with many former players was played in celebration of the 40th anniversary of KEC. The team of Hardy Nilsson, "Kölsche of Sharks", won 8-4 against the "Kölsche of Volcanoes" coached by Hans Zach.

The Sharks finished second in the standings in 2012/2013. After success against Straubing (4-1) and Wolfsburg (3-0) it was defeated in the finale by the Eisbären Berlin in a 1-3 series. In the following season, 2013/2014, the Sharks finished fifth in the standings. After victories in the quarterfinals and semi-finals they lost in the finals in a 3-4 series against ERC Ingolstadt.

On Wednesday, 3 October 2018, the Sharks played a friendly exhibition game against the Edmonton Oilers of the National Hockey League which they lost by a score of 4–3 in overtime.

== Home arena ==
=== History ===
The ice and swimming stadium Eisstadion an der Lentstraße was Kölner EK's first home in Cologne. The stadium was built in 1936 and home to the Ice Hockey World Championship in 1955. The capacity of 7,200 seats put it in the upper third of DEL arena size.

In 1998 the Kölner Haie moved into the Lanxess Arena. Close to the Lanxess Arena, the Kölner Haie built facilities for a hockey training center and their headquarters.

=== Home attendance ===
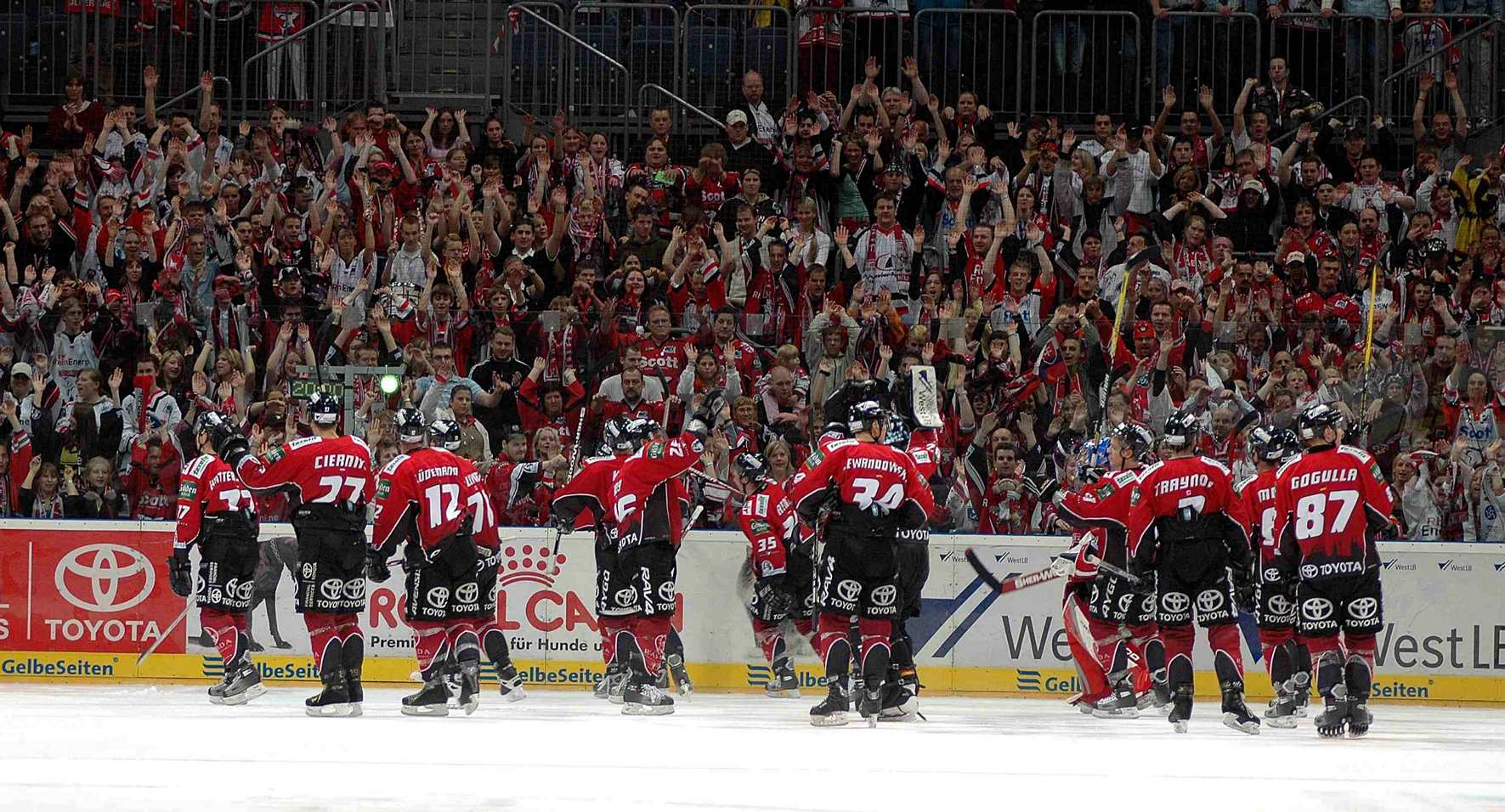
The Sharks celebrate a victory over the Augsburger Panther (season 2005–06).

Home attendance for the last years
Season	Home	Viewer	Viewer per game
2017/18	26 (- / -)	329,212	11,222
2016/17	26 (- / -)	329,212	12,662
2015/16	30 (26 / 4)	304,522	12,037
2014/15	30 (26 / 4)	290,188	11,161
2013/14	30 (26 / 4)	384,198	11,712
2012/13	33 (26 / 7)	417,187	12,199
2011/12	29 (26 / 3)	301,431	10,494
2010/11	28 (26 / 2)	277,409	9,907
2009/10	29 (28 / 1)	291,421	10,076
2008/09	26 (26 / 0)	268,895	10,342
2007/08	36 (28 / 8)	471,514	12,318
2006/07	30 (26 / 4)	391,101	13,037
2005/06	30 (26 / 4)	384,198	12,453
2004/05	30 (26 / 4)	375,423	12,235

In brackets are listed the league and playoff games.

== Honours ==
=== Domestic ===
Deutsche Eishockey Liga

- (gold) Winners: 1977, 1979, 1984, 1986, 1987, 1988, 1995, 2002
- (silver) Runners-up: 1991, 1993, 1996, 2000, 2003, 2008, 2013, 2014, 2025

Deutscher Eishockey-Pokal

- (gold) Winners: 2004

=== International ===
European Cup

- (silver) Runners-up: 1985, 1996
- (bronze) 3rd place: 1989

=== Pre-season ===
Spengler Cup

- (gold) Winners: 1999

Tatra Cup

- (gold) Winners: 2011

== Season statistics ==
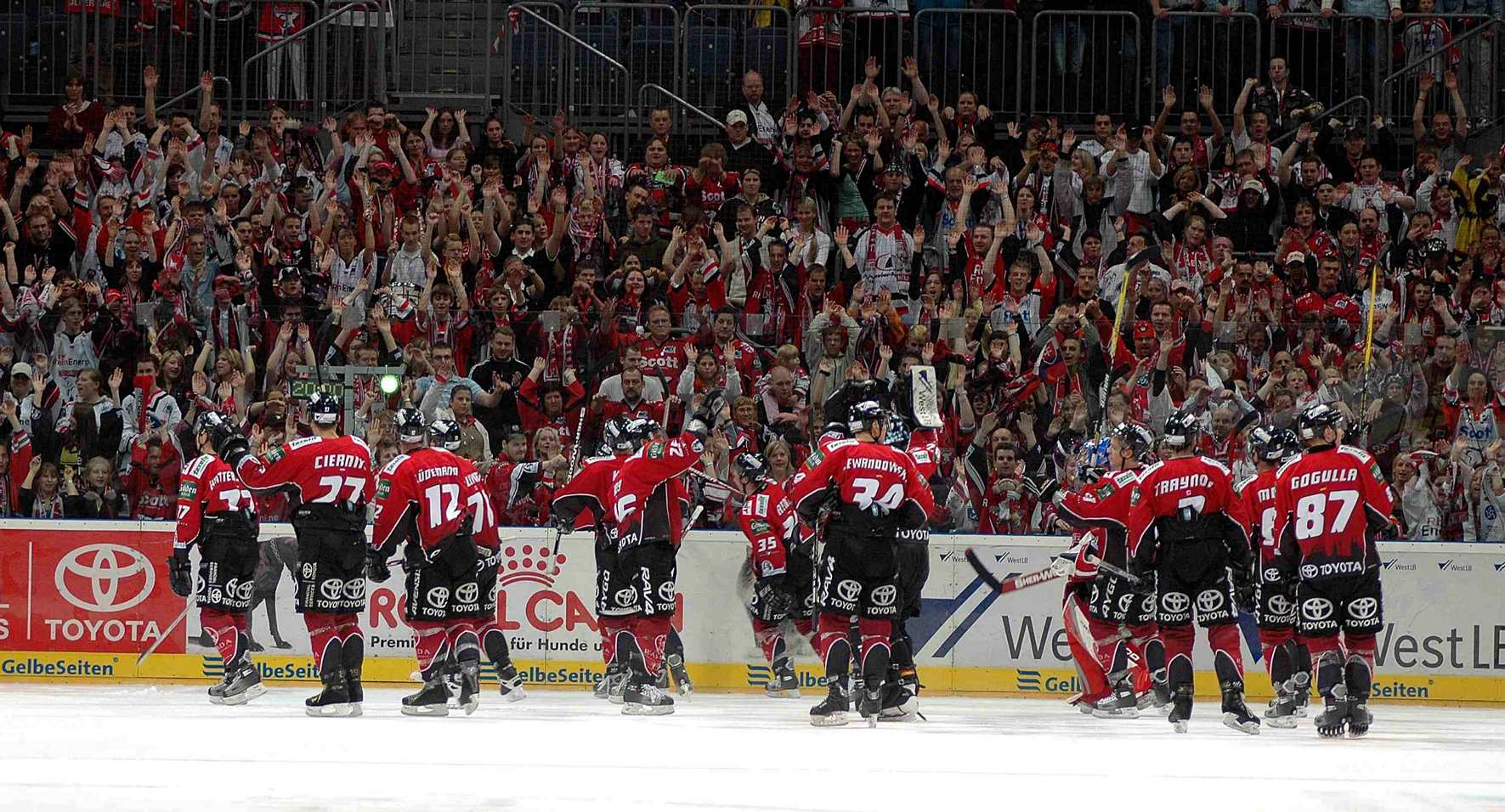
The Sharks celebrate a victory over the Augsburger Panther in the 2005–06 season.

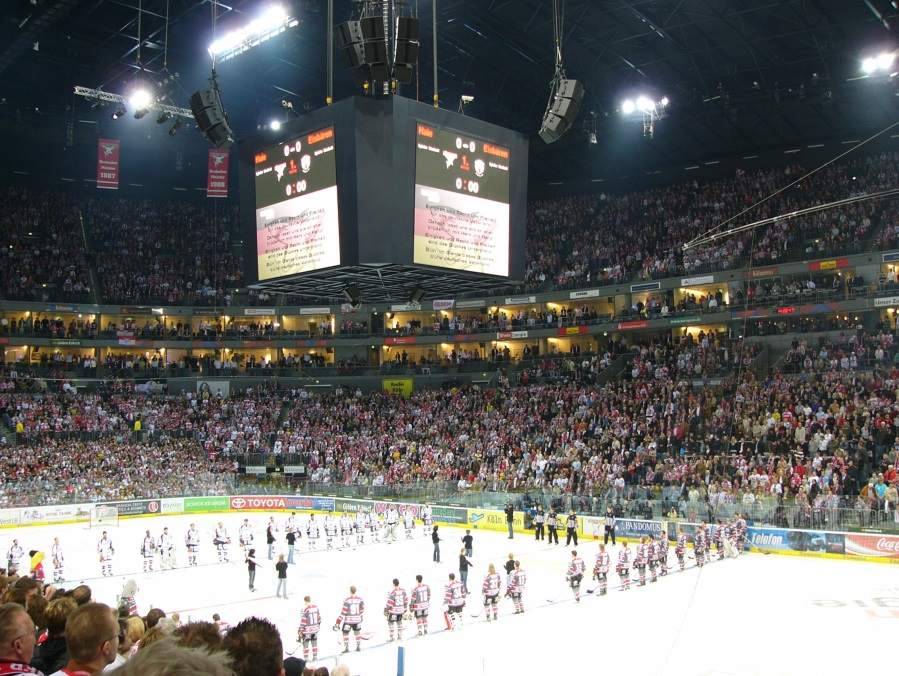
Pregame festivities at Game 4 of the 2007–08 Championship final between the Haie and Eisbären Berlin

Standings
Season	League	Regular season	Playoffs	Final standings
1972–73	Oberliga	1st		1st Promotion to Bundesliga
1973–74	Bundesliga	8th		8th
1974–75	Bundesliga	7th		7th
1975–76	Bundesliga	6th		6th
1976–77	Bundesliga	1st		Champion
1977–78	Bundesliga	3rd		3rd
1978–79	Bundesliga	1st		Champion
1979–80	Bundesliga	6th		6th
1980–81	Bundesliga	9th		9th
	(Introduction of Playoffs), Kölner Haie lost 20 points due to counterfeiting player licenses
1981–82	Bundesliga	2nd	Semi-final	3rd
1982–83	Bundesliga	4th	Semi-final	4th
1983–84	Bundesliga	2nd	Finals	Champion
1984–85	Bundesliga	2nd	Semi-final	3rd
1985–86	Bundesliga	1st	Finals	Champion
1986–87	Bundesliga	2nd	Finals	Champion
1987–88	Bundesliga	2nd	Finals	Champion
1988–89	Bundesliga	1st	Semi-final	3rd
1989–90	Bundesliga	2nd	Semi-final	3rd
1990–91	Bundesliga	1st	Finals	Champion Runner-up
1991–92	Bundesliga	3rd	Quarter-finals	5th
1992–93	Bundesliga	2nd	Finals	Champion Runner-up
1993–94	Bundesliga	5th	Semi-final	4th

=== DEL since 1994 ===
Season	Games	Won	Lost	Tie	OTL	SOL	Points	Goals for	Goals against	Rank	Playoffs
1994–95	44	28	14	2	-	-	60	185	125	6	Champions
1995–96	50	37	9	4	-	-	79	261	129	1	Lost in Finals
1996–97	50	36	10	2	2	-	76	235	142	2	Lost in Quarterfinals
1997–98	48	26	14	6	2	-	60	160	147	3	Lost in Quarterfinals
1998–99	52	21	15	9	7	-	88	182	159	5	Lost in Quarterfinals
1999–00	56	35	10	0	11	-	114	217	144	1	Lost in Finals
2000–01	60	35	13	0	12	-	111	186	154	2	Lost in Quarterfinals
2001–02	60	30	24	0	6	-	93	173	153	6	Champions
2002–03	52	30	7	15	0	-	101	151	117	2	Lost in Finals
2003–04	52	29	14	0	9	-	93	160	134	4	Lost in Quarterfinals
2004–05	52	29	15	0	8	-	92	146	120	4	Lost in Quarterfinals
2005–06	52	30	17	-	0	5	89	185	143	5	Lost in Semi-finals
2006–07	52	28	15	-	5	4	91	177	135	5	Lost in Semi-finals
2007–08	56	37	12	-	4	3	109	192	146	3	Lost in Finals
2008–09	52	19	23	-	5	5	63	147	166	15	Out of playoffs
2009–10	56	25	26	-	4	1	74	178	190	10	Lost in Preliminary Finals
2010–11	52	25	20	-	1	6	73	159	162	9	Lost in Quarterfinals
2011–12	52	25	20	-	5	2	78	135	145	9	Lost in Quarterfinals
2012–13	52	29	16	-	1	1	99	165	137	2	Lost in Finals
2013–14	52	23	16	-	3	3	89	147	118	5	Lost in Finals
2014–15	52	23	23	-	2	4	71	124	149	11	Out of playoffs
2015–16	52	20	23	-	0	1	77	146	138	7	Lost in Semi-finals
2016–17	52	34	18	-	0	2	97	145	109	4	Lost in Quarterfinals
2017–18	52	21	22	-	1	3	77	148	142	6	Lost in Quarterfinals
2018–19	52	23	18	-	4	1	86	147	139	4	Lost in Semi-finals
2019–20	52	20	23	-	7	2	65	124	153	11	Cancelled due to the COVID-19 pandemic.
2020–21	38	15	18	-	1	4	46	114	135	12	Out of playoffs
2021–22	56	26	23	-	3	4	74	155	175	10	Lost in Quarterfinals
2022–23	56	32	21	-	2	1	92	197	153	6	Lost in Quarterfinals
2023–24	52	20	20	-	2	4	78	155	158	8	Lost in Pre-playoffs
2024–25	52	25	18	-	4	2	87	156	148	6	Lost in Finals
2025–26	52	39	11	-	1	1	116	200	136	1	Lost in Semi-finals

== Players and personnel ==
=== Current roster ===
Updated 28 September 2024.

No.	Nat	Player	Pos	S/G	Age	Acquired	Birthplace
53	(Sweden)	Adam Almqvist	D	L	35	2024	Jönköping, Sweden
45	(Germany)	Tobias Ancicka	G	L	25	2023	Heilbronn, Germany
35	(Slovakia)	Július Hudáček	G	R	38	2024	Spišská Nová Ves, Slovakia
15	(Canada)	Louis-Marc Aubry	C	L	35	2022	Trois-Rivières, Quebec, Canada
57	(Canada)	Brady Austin	D	L	33	2022	Bobcaygeon, Ontario, Canada
7	(Belarus)	Nick Bailen	D	R	36	2022	Fredonia, New York, United States
5	(Germany)	Robin van Calster	C	L	23	2021	Bonheiden, Germany
18	(Canada)	Josh Currie	C	R	34	2024	Charlottetown, Prince Edward Island, Canada
22	(Germany)	Maximilian Glötzl	D	L	24	2019	Schongau, Germany
92	(Germany)	Håkon Hänelt	F	L	23	2023	Berlin, Germany
9	(Germany)	Maximilian Kammerer	C	L	30	2021	Düsseldorf, Germany
34	(Germany)	Elias Lindner	F	L	25	2023	Mainburg, Germany
27	(Germany)	Niklas Lunemann	G	L	24	2022	Kassel, Germany
89	(Canada)	Gregor MacLeod	LW	L	28	2023	Halifax, Nova Scotia, Canada
91	(Germany)	Moritz Müller (C)	D	L	39	2003	Frankfurt, Germany
65	(Germany)	Marco Münzenberger	F	R	21	2024	Solingen, Germany
55	(Germany)	Edwin Tropmann	D	R	21	2022	Lippstadt, Germany
46	(Germany)	Kevin Niedenz	RW	L	23	2024	Berlin, Germany
30	(Germany)	Mirko Pantkowski	G	L	28	2022	Kassel, Germany
10	(Germany)	Justin Schütz	LW	L	26	2023	Kassel, Germany
17	(Germany)	Jan Luca Sennhenn	D	L	26	2020	Kassel, Germany
9	(Denmark)	Frederik Storm	LW	L	37	2023	Gentofte, Denmark
36	(Sweden)	Andreas Thuresson	LW	R	38	2021	Kristianstad, Sweden
62	(Germany)	Parker Tuomie	RW	L	31	2024	Haßfurt, Germany
21	(Finland)	Juhani Tyrväinen	C	L	36	2024	Seinäjoki, Finland
47	(Finland)	Veli-Matti Vittasmäki	D	L	36	2024	Turku, Finland

=== Retired numbers ===
Eight jersey numbers are no longer issued by the Kölner Haie.

- Josef Heiss – #1 He played from 1988 to 2001 for the Kölner Haie.
- Udo Kießling – #4 He was inducted into the International Ice Hockey Federation Hall of Fame in 2000.
- Jörg Mayr – #6 He played exclusively for the Kölner Haie.
- Rainer and Ralph Philipp – #8 Their jersey number is no longer issued following the death of Ralph Philip.
- Miroslav Sikora – #11 His jersey number is no longer issued because of his 16-year association membership.
- Mirko Lüdemann – #12 His jersey number will be no longer issued after his retirement.
- Detlef Langemann – #14 He was captain of the first championship team in 1977.
- Robert Müller – #80 His jersey number was taken out of circulation following his death on 21 May 2009.

=== Notable players ===
- Sergei Berezin
- Philip Gogulla
- Thomas Greiss
- Alex Hicks
- Mike Johnson
- Ryan Jones
- Udo Kießling
- Uwe Krupp
- Erich Kühnhackl
- Leon Draisaitl
- Dave McLlwain
- Marcel Müller
- Robert Müller
- Jeremy Roenick
- Jozef Stümpel
- Ray Whitney

=== Head coaches ===
- Ondrej Bendík, 1972–73
- Jiří Hanzl, 1973–74*
- Ondrej Bendík, 1974–76*
- Kjell-Rune Milton, 1975–76*
- Uli Rudel, 1975–76
- Gerhard Kießling, 1976–77
- Olle Öst, 1977–78
- Gerhard Kießling, 1978–79
- Otto Schneitberger, 1979–80
- Heinz Weisenbach, 1980–83
- Jozef Golonka, 1983–85
- Hardy Nilsson, 1985-92
- Vladimir Vasiliev, 1992-95*
- Bob Murdoch, 1995–97
- Kevin Primeau, 1997–98*
- Timo Lahtinen, 1997–99*
- Lance Nethery, 1999–00
- Bob Leslie, 2000–01*
- Lance Nethery, 2000–02*
- Rich Chernomaz, 2001–02
- Hans Zach, 2002–06
- Doug Mason, 2006–08*
- Clayton Beddoes, 2008*
- Rupert Meister, 2008–09
- Igors Pavlovs, 2009*
- Bill Stewart, 2009–10*
- Niklas Sundblad, 2010–11
- Uwe Krupp, 2011–14*
- Niklas Sundblad, 2014–16*
- Cory Clouston, 2016–17*
- Peter Draisaitl, 2017–19*
- Dan Lacroix, 2019*
- Mike Stewart, 2019–20*
- Uwe Krupp, 2020–

*Fired/resigned during the season.

=== Championship teams ===
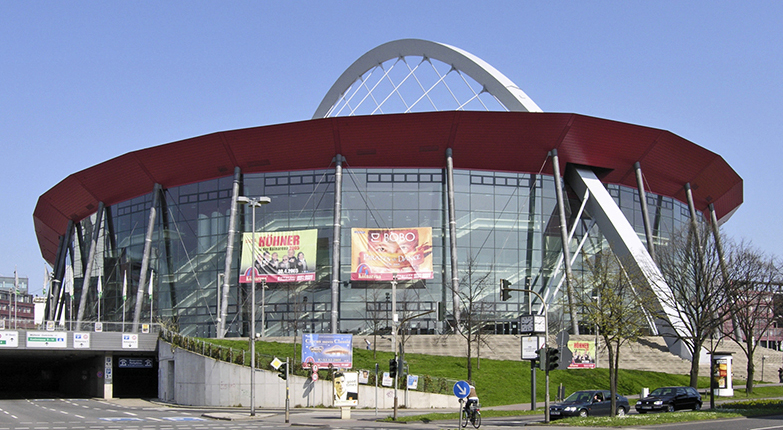
Lanxess Arena, home ice since 1998

German Champion 1977

Position	Name (jersey number)
Goalie:	Axel Richter (1), Wolf Herbst (2)
Defender:	Jouko Öystilä (4), Harald Krüll (5), Kjell-Rune Milton (9), Dieter Langemann (3), Matthias Maurer (17), Bernd Beyerbach (19), Udo Kießling (25)
Forward:	Peter Schiller (6), Karl-Gustav Richter (7), Michael Muus (8), Craig Sarner (11), Hans Rothkirch (12), Erich Kühnhackl (24), Marcus Kuhl (15), Wim Hospelt (18), Franz Hofherr (20), Henryk Jaworowski (23), Detlef Langemann (14)
Head Coach:	Gerhard Kießling

German Champion 1979

Position	Name (jersey number)
Goalie:	Claus Verleih (21), Rainer Makatsch (25)
Defender:	Udo Kießling (4), Harald Krüll (5), Christian Nikola (8), Vic Stanfield (18), Georg Kink
Forward:	Walter Stadler (2), Peter Schiller (6), Dick Decloe (7), Miroslav Sikora (11), Hans Rothkirch (12), Hardy Nilsson (13), Erich Kühnhackl (14), Marcus Kuhl (15), Siegfried Hardt (16), Franz Hofherr (20), Henryk Jaworowski (23), Detlef Langemann (24)
Head Coach:	Gerhard Kießling

German Champion 1984

Position	Name (jersey number)
Goalie:	Helmut de Raaf (1), Peter Zankl (20)
Defender:	Toni Forster (2), Udo Kießling (4), Uwe Krupp (5), Richard Trojan (6), Peter Gailer (7), Werner Kühn (18), Rene Ledock] (21), Uli Hiemer (25)
Forward:	Rainer Philipp (8), Drew Callander (9), Miroslav Sikora (11), Christoph Augsten (12), Jörg Lautwein (14), Marcus Kuhl (15), Holger Meitinger (16), Gerd Truntschka (17), Jörg Parschill (19), Peter Schiller (22), Guido Lenzen (23), Rob Tudor (24), Georg Giovannakis
Head Coach:	Jozef Golonka

German Champion 1986

Position	Name (jersey number)
Goalie:	Helmut de Raaf (1), Thomas Bornträger (30), Alexander Lange
Defender:	Udo Kießling (4), Justyn Denisiuk (5), Richard Trojan (6), Brian Young (7), Werner Kühn (18), Rene Ledock (21), Uwe Krupp (25)
Forward:	Bodo Kummer (2), Marc Otten (9), Doug Berry (10), Miroslav Sikora (11), Christoph Augsten (12), Boguslav Maj (13), Gordon Blumenschein (15), Holger Meitinger (16), Gerd Truntschka (17), Peter Schiller (22), Steve McNeil (24), Helmut Steiger (27)
Head Coach:	Hardy Nilsson

German Champion 1987

Position	Name (jersey number)
Goalie:	Helmut de Raaf (1), Thomas Bornträger (30), Alexander Lange
Defender:	Tom Thornbury (3), Udo Kießling (4), Justyn Denisiuk (5), Brian Young (7), Andreas Pokorny (14), Werner Kühn (18), Rene Ledock (21)
Forward:	Marc Otten (9), Doug Berry (10), Miroslav Sikora (11), Christoph Augsten (12), Boguslav Maj (13), Holger Meitinger (16), Gerd Truntschka (17), Thomas Gröger (19), Dieter Hegen (23), Udo Schmid (26), Helmut Steiger (27)
Head Coach:	Hardy Nilsson

German Champion 1988

Position	Name (jersey number)
Goalie:	Helmut de Raaf (1), Dirk Voss (22), Marcus Beeck (30)
Defender:	Tom Thornbury (3), Udo Kießling (4), Andreas Pokorny (14), Peter Romberg (15), Werner Kühn (18), Rene Ledock (21), Robert Sterflinger (24)
Forward:	Thomas Brandl (7), Roger Nicholas (9), Doug Berry (10), Miroslav Sikora (11), Holger Meitinger (16), Gerd Truntschka (17), Thomas Gröger (19), Dieter Hegen (23), Ernst Köpf (25), Udo Schmid (26), Helmut Steiger (27), Jörg Jung
Head Coach:	Hardy Nilsson

German Champion 1995

Position	Name (jersey number)
Goalie:	Josef Heiß (1), Olaf Grundmann (33)
Defender:	Thorsten Sendt (2), Mike Schmidt (4), Jörg Mayr (6), Mirko Lüdemann (12), Andreas Pokorny (14), Karsten Mende (23), Frank Hohenadl (24), Herbert Hohenberger (30)
Forward:	Thomas Brandl (7), Stefan Mann (9), Ronny Reddo (10), Leo Stefan (13), Peter Draisaitl (17), Andreas Lupzig (22), Michael Rumrich (26), Martin Ondrejka (29), Tobias Abstreiter (37), Franz Demmel (55), Sergei Beresin (94), Thorsten Koslowski ( )
Head Coach:	Wladimir Wassiljew (to January 1995), Bob Murdoch (from January 1995)

German Champion 2002

Position	Name (jersey number)
Goalie:	Dimitri Pätzold (30), Chris Rogles (31), Michael Hirt (40)
Defender:	Markus Jocher (5), Jörg Mayr (6), Petri Liimatainen (7), Mirko Lüdemann (12), Toni Porkka (16), Brad Schlegel (29), Andreas Renz (35), John Miner (47)
Forward:	Collin Danielsmeier (10), Christoph Ullmann (13), Dwayne Norris (14), Björn Barta (15), Alexander Kuzminski (18), Vitali Stähle (19), Alex Hicks (21), Niklas Sundblad (25), Jason Young (28), Corey Millen (33), Andre Faust (36), Tino Boos (37), Benjamin Hinterstocker (38), Thomas Schinko (39), Éric Bertrand (44), Dave McLlwain (71)
Head Coach:	Lance Nethery (to February 2002), Rich Chernomaz (from February 2002)

== Team records ==
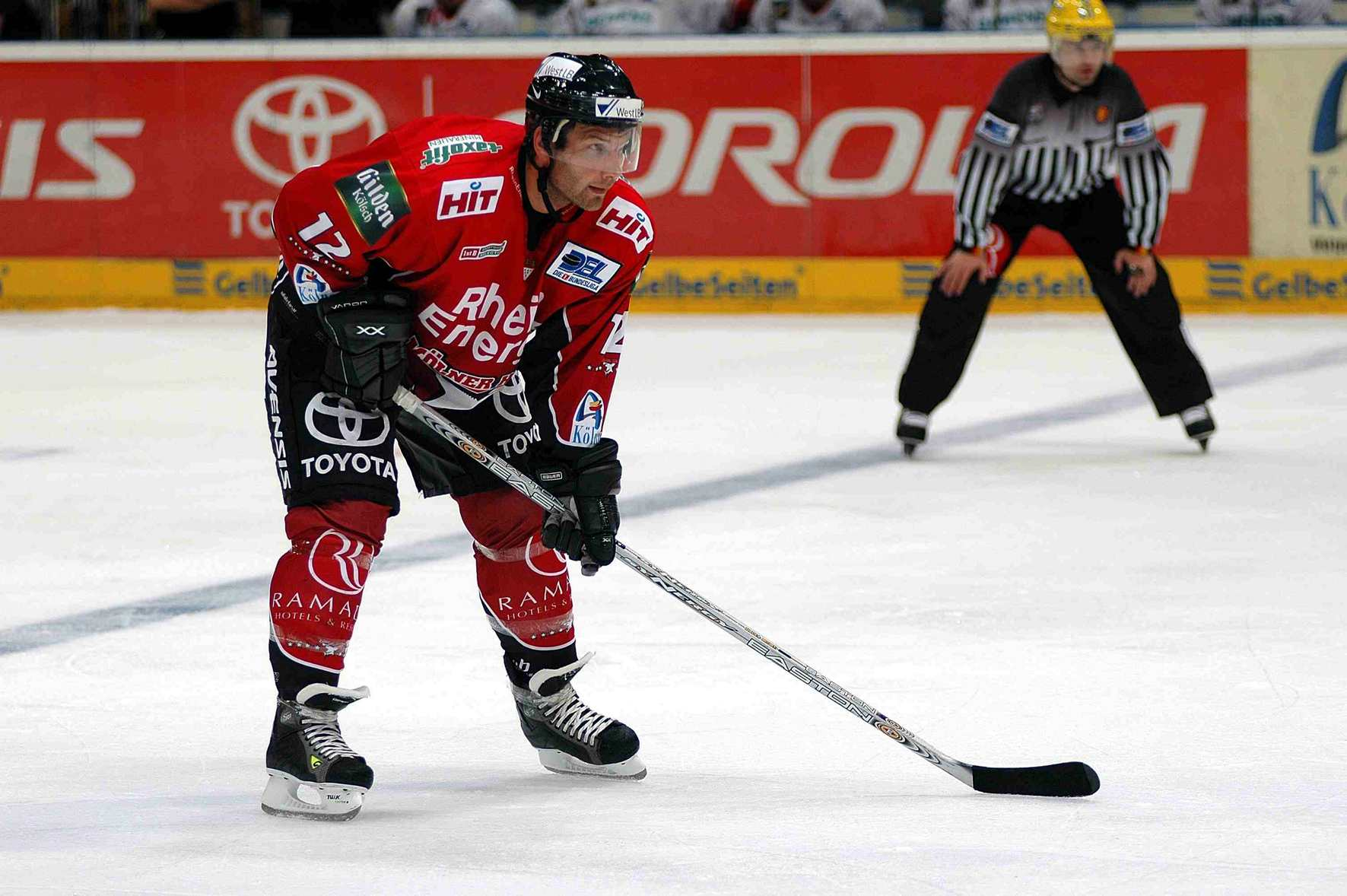
Mirko Lüdemann

Career games

- Mirko Lüdemann (1,002 games)
- Josef Heiß (690 games)
- Miroslav Sikora (644 games)

Career goals

- Miroslav Sikora (442 goals)
- Gerd Truntschka (270 goals)
- Marcus Kuhl (250 goals)

Career points

- Miroslav Sikora (838 points)
- Gerd Truntschka (825 points)
- Mirko Lüdemann (511 points)

Career penalty minutes

- Dave McLlwain (852 minutes)
- Andreas Lupzig (811 minutes)
- Andreas Renz (809 minutes)

Longest game

- 168:16 minutes (22. March 2008 – 23. March 2008, Semi-final versus Adler Mannheim, scorer of the game-winning-goal was Philip Gogulla, longest game in German ice hockey history and 2nd-longest ice hockey game all-time)
