= 1994–95 DEL season =

1994-95 Deutsche Eishockey Liga season
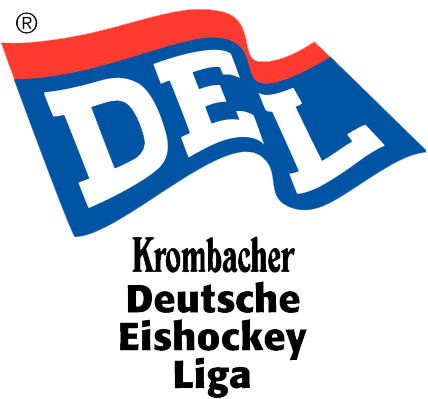
- League: Deutsche Eishockey Liga
- Sport: Ice hockey
- Teams: 18

1994–95
- Season champions: Kölner Haie

DEL seasons
- ← Bundesliga 1995–96 →

The 1994–95 Deutsche Eishockey Liga season was the inaugural season of the Deutsche Eishockey Liga (German Ice Hockey League). The Kölner Haie (Cologne Sharks) won the first DEL season to become German Champions.

The first season 1994–95 started with 18 teams, twelve from the old 1st Bundesliga, six from the 2nd Bundesliga.

The new league immediately attracted corporate sponsorship with the Krombacher Brewery featuring a prominent spot on the league logo.

== Regular season ==
In the main round the 18 teams played a home-and-away schedule and, in regional groups, a second single round. After this, the play-off round of the last sixteen in the mode best of seven took place . The semi-finals and final were played in the mode best of five. The hope to be able to avoid the troubles of the old Bundesliga by stricter financial controls did not materialise in the first season. EC Hedos München, the Bundesliga's last champion, now renamed Maddogs Munich, folded on 18 December 1994.

	Team	GP	Win	Tie	Lost	OTL	GF:GA	Points
1.	BSC Preussen	44	33	0	8	3	228:127	69
2.	EV Landshut	44	31	3	8	2	187:98	67
3.	Adler Mannheim	44	29	6	9	0	164:108	64
4.	Krefelder EV	44	29	3	10	2	203:127	63
5.	Düsseldorfer EG	44	29	4	10	1	196:128	63
6.	Kölner Haie	44	28	2	12	2	185:125	60
7.	Kassel Huskies	44	22	4	17	1	145:138	48
8.	SB Rosenheim	44	20	7	16	1	131:124	48
9.	Schwenninger ERC Wild Wings	44	18	7	17	2	174:148	45
10.	Frankfurt Lions	44	16	5	22	1	110:140	38
11.	Kaufbeurer Adler	44	12	7	21	4	138:181	35
12.	EHC 80 Nürnberg	44	11	9	23	1	151:187	32
13.	Augsburger Panther	44	12	7	25	0	137:189	31
14.	EC Hannover	44	13	4	26	1	120:177	31
15.	ESG Sachsen Weißwasser	44	8	5	27	4	89:182	25
16.	Ratinger Löwen	44	9	5	29	1	102:214	24
17.	EHC Eisbären Berlin	44	10	2	32	0	136:229	22
18.	Maddogs München	folded						

GP = Games played; OTL = Overtime Loss; GF:GA = Goals for and against
Color code: = Direct Playoff qualification, = Playoff qualification round, = No playoff

== Playoffs ==
Since 16 teams qualified for the playoffs, and Maddogs München folded, only Eisbären Berlin did not participate. The first two rounds were played as a best-of-seven, and the semifinals and finals as a best-of-five.

First round
1.	BSC Preussen	4
16.	Ratinger Löwen	0
8.	Starbulls Rosenheim	3
9.	Schwenninger ERC Wild Wings	4
3.	Adler Mannheim	4
14.	EC Hannover	1
6.	Kölner Haie	4
11.	Kaufbeurer Adler	0
2.	EV Landshut	4
15.	ESG Sachsen Weißwasser	0
7.	Kassel Huskies	4
10.	Frankfurt Lions	1
4.	Krefelder EV	4
13.	Augsburger EV	1
5.	Düsseldorfer EG	4
12.	EHC 80 Nürnberg	1

Quarterfinals
1.	BSC Preussen	4
9.	Schwenninger ERC Wild Wings	0
3.	Adler Mannheim	1
6.	Kölner Haie	4
2.	EV Landshut	4
7.	Kassel Huskies	0
4.	Krefelder EV	4
5.	Düsseldorfer EG	1

Semifinals
1.	BSC Preussen	1
6.	Kölner Haie	3
2.	EV Landshut	3
4.	Krefelder EV	2

Finals
2.	EV Landshut	2
6.	Kölner Haie	3

=== First round ===
			Game	1	2	3	4	5	6	7
BSC Preussen	–	Ratinger Löwen	4:0	4:0	9:2	4:3	4:1	–	–	–
EV Landshut	–	ESG Sachsen Weißwasser	4:0	5:1	5:2	4:1	7:3	–	–	–
Adler Mannheim	–	EC Hannover	4:1	8:2	6:1	2:4	6:1	8:4	–	–
Krefelder EV	–	Augsburger EV	4:1	6:2	2:3	9:8 SO	7:6	5:2	–	–
Düsseldorfer EG	–	EHC 80 Nürnberg	4:1	7:1	5:0	2:4	4:2	9:0	–	–
Kölner Haie	–	Kaufbeurer Adler	4:0	5:1	4:3	5:1	8:2	–	–	–
Kassel Huskies	–	Frankfurt Lions	4:1	6:5	4:3	2:5	5:3	2:1 OT	–	–
Starbulls Rosenheim	–	Schwenninger ERC Wild Wings	3:4	2:0	3:8	2:6	5:2	4:3 n.V.	3:6	5:6 OT

OT = Overtime; SO = Shootout

=== Quarterfinals ===
			Game	1	2	3	4	5	6	7
BSC Preussen	-	Schwenninger ERC Wild Wings	4:0	5:1	4:1	3:2 OT	8:3	–	–	–
EV Landshut	-	Kassel Huskies	4:0	4:3	6:3	6:3	11:4	–	–	–
Adler Mannheim	-	Kölner Haie	1:4	3:4	2:3	5:3	2:7	0:6	–	–
Krefelder EV	-	Düsseldorfer EG	4:1	1:0	5:4 OT	3:9	5:3	4:1	–	–

OT = Overtime; SO = Shootout

=== Semifinals ===
			Game	1	2	3	4	5
BSC Preussen	-	Kölner Haie	1:3	3:1	2:5	1:5	0:3	–
EV Landshut	-	Krefelder EV	3:2	3:4 OT	2:5	6:2	3:2	5:0

OT = Overtime; SO = Shootout

=== Finals ===
			Game	1	2	3	4	5
EV Landshut(L)	-	Kölner Haie	2:3	(L) 4:3 (3:0, 0:2, 1:1)	1:5 (1:3, 0:2, 0:0)	(L) 4:1 (1:0, 2:1, 1:0)	2:8 (2:2, 0:4, 0:2)	(L) 0:4 (0:0, 0:0, 0:4)

OT = Overtime; SO = Shootout

With the last game, the Kölner Haie became the first DEL Champion and German Champions for the 7th time in the club history.
