= 1995–96 DEL season =

1995-96 Deutsche Eishockey Liga season
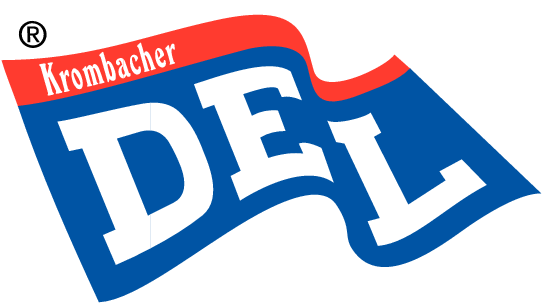
- League: Deutsche Eishockey Liga
- Sport: Ice hockey
- Teams: 18

1995-96
- Season champions: Düsseldorfer EG

DEL seasons
- ← 1994–95 1996–97 →

The 1995–96 Deutsche Eishockey Liga season was the 2nd season of the Deutsche Eishockey Liga (German Ice Hockey League).

As a replacement for the Maddogs München, the SC Riessersee moved up from the 2nd Bundesliga. However, continuing the financial unrest in the German Ice Hockey, SC Riessersee, as well as ESG Sachsen Weißwasser and EC Hannover had to leave the league. Düsseldorfer EG won the German championship by becoming the second DEL champion.

The corporate sponsor, the Krombacher Brewery, continued their engagement, albeit now less prominently featured on the league logo. The sponsorship agreement ended after this season.

== Regular season ==
The league used a regular season format of 50 games, consisting of a double round-robin for the first 34 games, and then another double round-robin between the nine odd-positioned and the nine even-positioned teams respectively for 16 games. After this, the play-off round of the last sixteen in the mode best of seven took place. The semi-finals and final were played in the mode best of five. The hope to be able to avoid the troubles of the old Bundesliga by stricter financial controls did not materialise in the first season. EC Hedos München, the Bundesliga's last champion, now renamed Mad Dogs Munich, folded on 18 December 1994.

	Club	GP	Win	Tie	Loss	OTL	GF:GA	Points
1.	Kölner Haie	50	37	4	8	1	261:121	79
2.	Preussen Devils Berlin	50	35	7	6	2	219:107	79
3.	Düsseldorfer EG	50	36	4	9	1	228:127	77
4.	EV Landshut	50	35	1	11	0	222:127	77
5.	Schwenninger Wild Wings	50	30	6	12	2	214:150	68
6.	Adler Mannheim	50	29	7	12	2	195:163	67
7.	Krefeld Pinguine	50	26	5	18	1	169:154	58
8.	Frankfurt Lions	50	22	5	20	3	189:162	52
9.	EC Kassel Huskies	50	19	12	17	2	149:148	52
10.	Ratinger Löwen	50	21	3	23	3	181:195	48
11.	Nürnberg Ice Tigers	50	16	8	24	2	143:179	42
12.	Augsburger Panther	50	17	6	25	2	163:180	42
13.	SB Rosenheim	50	16	6	25	3	158:195	41
14.	SC Riessersee	50	16	4	29	1	147:213	37
15.	Kaufbeurer Adler	50	13	6	30	1	145:228	33
16.	EC Hannover	50	12	4	34	0	138:251	28
17.	EHC Eisbären Berlin	50	11	3	34	2	125:236	27
18.	ESG Sachsen Weißwasser	50	9	3	38	0	126:236	21

GP = Games played; OTL = Overtime Loss; GF:GA = Goals for and against
Color code: = Playoffs, = Season end

== Playoffs ==
All playoff rounds were played in as a best-of-five series.

First round
1.	Kölner Haie	3
16.	EC Hannover	0
5.	Schwenninger ERC Wild Wings	1
12.	Augsburg Panther	3
4.	EV Landshut	3
13.	Starbulls Rosenheim	1
6.	Adler Mannheim	3
11.	Nürnberg Ice Tigers	2
3.	Düsseldorfer EG	3
14.	SC Riessersee	0
7.	Krefeld Pinguine	3
10.	Ratinger Löwen	0
2.	Preußen Devils Berlin	3
15.	Kaufbeurer Adler	0
8.	Frankfurt Lions	0
9.	EC Kassel Huskies	3

Quarterfinals
1.	Kölner Haie	3
12.	Augsburger Panther	0
4.	EV Landshut	3
6.	Adler Mannheim	0
3.	Düsseldorfer EG	3
7.	Krefeld Pinguine	0
2.	Preußen Devils Berlin	3
9.	EC Kassel Huskies	2

Semifinals
1.	Kölner Haie	3
4.	EV Landshut	1
2.	Preußen Devils Berlin	0
3.	Düsseldorfer EG	3

Finals
1.	Kölner Haie	1
3.	Düsseldorfer EG	3

=== First round ===
The even the chances, and enable the worse-placed team two home-games, the games were played in a Home-Away-Away-Home-Home series. This led to the Frankfurt Lions having only 1 home game, despite being the better placed team.

			Game	1	2	3	4	5
Kölner Haie	-	EC Hannover	3:0	6:1	9:2	7:1	–	–
Preußen Devils	-	Kaufbeurer Adler	3:0	7:2	8:3	11:2	–	–
Düsseldorfer EG	-	SC Riessersee	3:0	6:1	3:2	6:3	–	–
EV Landshut	-	Starbulls Rosenheim	3:1	7:0	4:2	3:5	5:1	–
Schwenninger ERC Wild Wings	-	Augsburger Panther	1:3	6:3	3:9	1:3	4:5 OT	–
Adler Mannheim	-	Nürnberg Ice Tigers	3:2	4:5 OT	2:1	0:2	3:0	2:1 OT
Krefeld Pinguine	-	Ratinger Löwen	3:0	5:1	3:2 OT	4:2	–	–
Frankfurt Lions	-	EC Kassel Huskies	0:3	3:4	3:4	1:2	–	–

OT = Overtime; SO = Shootout

=== Quarterfinals ===
			Game	1	2	3	4	5
Kölner Haie	-	Augsburger Panther	3:0	8:5	5:3	7:3	–	–
Preußen Devils Berlin	-	EC Kassel Huskies	3:2	3:4 OT	4:3	5:1	4:5 OT	3:1
Düsseldorfer EG	-	Krefeld Pinguine	3:0	4:1	5:4	7:5	–	–
EV Landshut	-	Adler Mannheim	3:0	3:2	4:1	3:2 OT	–	–

OT = Overtime; SO = Shootout

=== Semifinals ===
			Game	1	2	3	4	5
Kölner Haie	-	EV Landshut	3:1	4:2	6:5	6:9	5:4 OT	–
Preußen Devils Berlin	-	Düsseldorfer EG	0:3	5:6	2:5	0:6	–	–

OT = Overtime; SO = Shootout

=== Finals ===
			Game	1	2	3	4	5
Kölner Haie	-	Düsseldorfer EG	1:3	7:4	1:5	0:5	2:4	–

OT = Overtime; SO = Shootout

With the last game, Düsseldorfer EG became the second DEL Champion and German Champions for the 8th time in the club history.
