= 1985–86 ice hockey Bundesliga season =

German ice hockey season

The 1985–86 Ice hockey Bundesliga season was the 28th season of the Ice hockey Bundesliga, the top level of ice hockey in Germany. 10 teams participated in the league, and Kolner EC won the championship.

== First round ==
| | Club | GP | W | T | L | GF–GA | Pts |
|---|---|---|---|---|---|---|---|
| 1. | Kölner EC | 36 | 26 | 4 | 6 | 198: 88 | 56:16 |
| 2. | Düsseldorfer EG | 36 | 23 | 5 | 8 | 216:141 | 51:21 |
| 3. | SB Rosenheim (M) | 36 | 20 | 4 | 12 | 158:100 | 44:28 |
| 4. | ECD Iserlohn | 36 | 19 | 6 | 11 | 170:138 | 44:28 |
| 5. | EV Landshut | 36 | 17 | 1 | 18 | 142:149 | 35:37 |
| 6. | ESV Kaufbeuren | 36 | 15 | 4 | 17 | 162:183 | 34:38 |
| 7. | Mannheimer ERC | 36 | 12 | 9 | 15 | 137:159 | 33:39 |
| 8. | Schwenninger ERC | 36 | 13 | 4 | 19 | 135:181 | 30:42 |
| 9. | SC Riessersee | 36 | 8 | 5 | 23 | 126:197 | 21:51 |
| 10. | SV Bayreuth (N) | 36 | 3 | 6 | 27 | 115:223 | 12:60 |

== Relegation round ==
| | Club | GP | W | T | L | GF–GA | Pts |
|---|---|---|---|---|---|---|---|
| 1. | Eintracht Frankfurt | 18 | 12 | 3 | 3 | 86:45 | 27:9 |
| 2. | SC Riessersee | 18 | 11 | 2 | 5 | 89:61 | 24:12 |
| 3. | Augsburger EV | 18 | 10 | 4 | 4 | 95:62 | 24:12 |
| 4. | BSC Preussen | 18 | 10 | 3 | 5 | 98:61 | 23:13 |
| 5. | ESG Kassel | 18 | 9 | 4 | 5 | 96:71 | 22:14 |
| 6. | SV Bayreuth | 18 | 8 | 3 | 7 | 85:66 | 19:17 |
| 7. | Duisburger SC | 18 | 7 | 1 | 10 | 97:107 | 15:21 |
| 8. | EHC Freiburg | 18 | 5 | 2 | 11 | 75:96 | 12:24 |
| 9. | EC Bad Tölz | 18 | 4 | 2 | 12 | 58:105 | 10:26 |
| 10. | ERC Sonthofen | 18 | 2 | 0 | 16 | 46:151 | 4:32 |

== Playoffs ==
=== Quarterfinals ===
| | | | Series | 1 | 2 | 3 | 4 | 5 |
|---|---|---|---|---|---|---|---|---|
| Kölner EC | – | Schwenninger ERC | 3:0 | 4:3 OT | 6:2 | 8:0 | – | – |
| Düsseldorfer EG | – | Mannheimer ERC | 3:0 | 9:3 | 6:3 | 6:4 | – | – |
| SB Rosenheim | – | ESV Kaufbeuren | 3:1 | 8:2 | 0:2 | 10:5 | 6:2 | – |
| ECD Iserlohn | – | EV Landshut | 3:0 | 2:0 | 7:4 | 4:2 | – | – |

=== Semifinals ===
| | | | Series | 1 | 2 | 3 | 4 | 5 |
|---|---|---|---|---|---|---|---|---|
| Kölner EC | – | ECD Iserlohn | 3:1 | 6:2 | 0:2 | 7:2 | 5:0 | – |
| Düsseldorfer EG | – | SB Rosenheim | 3:0 | 4:3 | 5:2 | 10:5 | – | – |

=== 3rd place ===
| | | | Series | 1 | 2 |
|---|---|---|---|---|---|
| ECD Iserlohn | – | SB Rosenheim | 8:14 | 4:6 | 4:8 |

=== Final ===
| | | | Series | 1 | 2 | 3 | 4 | 5 |
|---|---|---|---|---|---|---|---|---|
| Kölner EC | – | Düsseldorfer EG | 3:0 | 6:5 | 6:5 | 6:1 | – | – |
