= Revierlöwen Oberhausen =

- City: Oberhausen, Germany
- League: Deutsche Eishockey Liga
- Founded: 1997
- Colours: Red, Green

Revierlöwen Oberhausen was an ice hockey team in Oberhausen, Germany. They played in the Deutsche Eishockey Liga from 1997 to 2002.

The club was founded in 1997, and folded in 2007.

== Achievements ==
- Regionalliga champion: 2004

== Season-by-season record ==
Season	League	First round	Play-offs
1997-98	DEL	13th place	1st Qualification round
1998-99	DEL	14th place	−
1999-00	DEL	14th place	6th place^{↓}
2000-01	DEL	6th place	Quarterfinals
2001-02	DEL	13th place	−
2003-04	Regionalliga	3rd place	1st place^{↑}
2004-05	Oberliga	10th place	1st place^{↓}
2005-06	Oberliga	17th place	6th place^{↓}
