= 1987–88 ice hockey Bundesliga season =

German ice hockey season

The 1987–88 Ice hockey Bundesliga season was the 30th season of the Ice hockey Bundesliga, the top level of ice hockey in Germany. 10 teams participated in the league, and Kolner EC won the championship.

== First round ==
	Club	GP	W	T	L	GF–GA	Pts
1.	SB Rosenheim	32	22	3	7	118:76	47:17
2.	Kölner EC (M)	32	18	6	8	167:98	42:22
3.	Mannheimer ERC	32	17	7	8	127:100	41:23
4.	EV Landshut	32	15	6	11	129:129	36:28
5.	Düsseldorfer EG	32	13	9	10	146:128	35:29
6.	ESV Kaufbeuren	32	13	2	17	126:149	28:36
7.	Eintracht Frankfurt	32	12	4	16	135:149	28:36
8.	Schwenninger ERC	32	9	4	19	100:145	22:42
9.	BSC Preussen (N)	32	3	3	26	90:164	9:55
10.	ECD Iserlohn	Did not play					

== Relegation round ==
	Club	GP	W	T	L	GF–GA	Pts
1.	BSC Preussen	18	16	1	1	107:48	33:3
2.	EHC Freiburg	18	15	0	3	92:38	30:6
3.	Krefelder EV	18	10	2	6	90:81	22:14
4.	SV Bayreuth	18	9	2	7	75:67	20:16
5.	EC Hedos München	18	9	2	7	94:84	20:16
6.	EC Kassel	18	8	3	7	104:98	19:17
7.	EHC Essen-West	18	7	2	9	66:84	16:20
8.	EC Bad Nauheim	18	5	3	10	78:82	13:23
9.	EC Ratingen	18	1	2	15	67:115	4:32
10.	EV Füssen	18	1	1	16	64:140	3:33

== Playoffs ==
=== Quarterfinals ===
			Series	1	2	3	4	5
SB Rosenheim	–	Schwenninger ERC	3:2	3:0	4:5 OT	4:5	3:1	4:0
Kölner EC	–	Eintracht Frankfurt	3:0	7:2	5:4	9:4	–	–
Mannheimer ERC	–	ESV Kaufbeuren	3:0	3:2 OT	3:0	4:2	–	–
EV Landshut	–	Düsseldorfer EG	1:3	4:2	2:5	4:5	1:9	–

=== Semifinals ===
			Series	1	2	3	4	5
SB Rosenheim	–	Düsseldorfer EG	3:1	3:1	2:4	7:2	3:1	–
Kölner EC	–	Mannheimer ERC	3:0	3:2	4:2	6:2	–	–

=== 3rd place ===
			Series	1	2
Düsseldorfer EG	–	Mannheimer ERC	12:13	3:3	9:10

=== Final ===
			Series	1	2	3	4	5
SB Rosenheim	–	Kölner EC	2:3	2:1	2:5	6:0	2:4	1:4
