= 1990–91 ice hockey Bundesliga season =

German ice hockey season

The 1990–91 Ice hockey Bundesliga season was the 33rd season of the Ice hockey Bundesliga, the top level of ice hockey in Germany. 12 teams participated in the league, and Düsseldorfer EG won the championship.

== First round ==
	Club	GP	W	T	L	GF–GA	Pts
1.	Kölner EC	44	32	3	9	227:132	67:21
2.	Düsseldorfer EG (M)	44	29	8	7	216:117	66:22
3.	SB Rosenheim	44	29	4	11	212:128	62:26
4.	BSC Preussen	44	22	4	18	195:148	48:40
5.	Mannheimer ERC	44	19	7	18	163:150	45:43
6.	Schwenninger ERC	44	19	5	20	171:171	43:45
7.	Eintracht Frankfurt	44	19	3	22	206:216	41:47
8.	EC Hedos München	44	16	7	21	169:191	39:49
9.	EV Landshut	44	15	7	22	177:202	37:51
10.	EHC Freiburg	44	14	2	28	161:213	30:58
11.	PEV Weißwasser (N)	44	12	3	29	139:240	27:61
12.	EHC Dynamo Berlin (N)	44	8	7	29	118:246	23:65

== Play-downs ==
=== First round ===
			Series	1	2	3	4	5	6	7
EV Landshut	–	EHC Dynamo Berlin	4:1	10:2	5:3	6:1	4:5	13:4	–	–
EHC Freiburg	–	PEV Weißwasser	4:1	3:2	2:3	6:4	4:3	4:2	–	–

=== Second round ===
			Series	1	2	3	4	5
PEV Weißwasser	–	EHC Dynamo Berlin	3:0	6:3	4:1	3:2	–	–

== Relegation ==
			Series	1	2	3
PEV Weißwasser	–	Krefelder EV	1:2	2:3	3:2	1:6

== Playoffs ==
=== Quarterfinals ===
			Series	1	2	3	4	5
Kölner EC	–	EC Hedos München	3:1	6:2	2:3	5:2	4:2	–
Düsseldorfer EG	–	Eintracht Frankfurt	3:0	7:0	7:1	9:4	–	–
SB Rosenheim	–	Schwenninger ERC	3:1	7:6 OT	2:4	6:0	3:2 OT	–
BSC Preussen	–	Mannheimer ERC	3:0	3:1	3:2 OT	7:2	–	–

=== Semifinals ===
			Series	1	2	3	4	5
Kölner EC	–	BSC Preussen	3:2	2:5	3:7	4:2	6:1	3:0)
Düsseldorfer EG	–	SB Rosenheim	3:2	2:3	1:5	8:1	4:2	7:4

=== 3rd place ===
			Series	1	2
BSC Preussen	–	SB Rosenheim	0:2	1:10	5:6

=== Final ===
			Series	1	2	3	4	5
Kölner EC	–	Düsseldorfer EG	2:3	1:3	1:5	4:3	1:0	0:4
