= 1991–92 ice hockey Bundesliga season =

German ice hockey season

The 1991–92 ice hockey Bundesliga season was the 34th season of the Ice hockey Bundesliga, the top level of ice hockey in Germany. 12 teams participated in the league, and Düsseldorfer EG won the championship.

== First round ==
	Club	GP	W	T	L	GF–GA	Pts
1.	Düsseldorfer EG (M)	44	35	4	5	249:109	74:14
2.	SB Rosenheim	44	32	3	9	214:142	67:21
3.	Kölner EC	44	29	3	12	191:120	61:27
4.	BSC Preussen	44	25	6	13	177:153	56:32
5.	EHC Freiburg	44	15	9	20	169:186	39:49
6.	Mannheimer ERC	44	15	9	20	152:174	39:49
7.	Krefelder EV (N)	44	16	6	22	140:158	38:50
8.	Schwenninger ERC	44	16	5	23	161:165	37:51
9.	EC Hedos München	44	13	9	22	165:183	35:53
10.	ESV Kaufbeuren (N)	44	13	6	25	158:211	32:56
11.	EV Landshut	44	9	8	27	140:214	26:62
12.	ES Weißwasser	44	10	4	30	131:232	24:64

== Play-downs ==
=== First round ===
			Series	1	2	3	4	5	6	7
Hedos München	–	ES Weißwasser	4:2	3:4	1:4	5:1	6:3	11:2	8:2	–
ESV Kaufbeuren	–	EV Landshut	4:1	6:5 OT	5:6	6:4	5:4 OT	6:4	–	–

=== Second round ===
			Series	1	2	3	4	5
EV Landshut	–	ES Weißwasser	1:3	2:5	4:3	3:6	3:5	–

== Relegation ==
			Series	1	2	3
ES Weißwasser	–	EC Ratingen	1:2	5:4 OT	2:3	2:5

== Playoffs ==
=== Quarterfinals ===
			Series	1	2	3	4	5
Düsseldorfer EG	–	Schwenninger ERC	3:0	5:1	5:2	11:1	–	–
SB Rosenheim	–	Krefelder EV	3:1	3:4 OT	6:4	9:0	4:0	–
Kölner EC	–	Mannheimer ERC	1:3	3:5	2:6	5:1	2:7	–
BSC Preussen	–	EHC Freiburg	3:1	3:0	6:2	0:2	5:4 OT	–

=== Semifinals ===
			Series	1	2	3	4	5
Düsseldorfer EG	–	Mannheimer ERC	3:0	10:2	4:1	7:2	–	–
SB Rosenheim	–	BSC Preussen	3:0	2:1	4:1	9:3	–	–

=== Final ===
			Series	1	2	3	4	5
Düsseldorfer EG	–	SB Rosenheim	3:0	3:1	4:1	6:2	–	–
