= 1986–87 ice hockey Bundesliga season =

German ice hockey season

The 1986–87 Ice hockey Bundesliga season was the 29th season of the Ice hockey Bundesliga, the top level of ice hockey in Germany. 10 teams participated in the league, and Kolner EC won the championship.

== First round ==
	Club	GP	W	T	L	GF–GA	Pts
1.	SB Rosenheim	36	23	3	10	158:118	49:23
2.	Kölner EC (M)	36	23	2	11	164:101	48:24
3.	Düsseldorfer EG	36	23	2	11	192:123	48:24
4.	Mannheimer ERC	36	21	1	14	158: 97	43:29
5.	ESV Kaufbeuren	36	19	3	14	133:142	41:31
6.	ECD Iserlohn	36	17	3	16	157:161	37:35
7.	Schwenninger ERC	36	16	3	17	123:147	35:37
8.	EV Landshut	36	13	2	21	139:178	28:44
9.	Eintracht Frankfurt (N)	36	9	2	25	107:169	20:52
10.	SC Riessersee	36	5	1	30	100:195	11:61

== Relegation round ==
	Club	GP	W	T	L	GF–GA	Pts
1.	BSC Preussen	18	13	3	2	87:53	29:7
2.	Eintracht Frankfurt	18	13	2	3	99:55	28:8
3.	EHC Freiburg	18	12	3	3	119:56	27:9
4.	SV Bayreuth	18	9	2	7	76:89	20:16
5.	Krefelder EV	18	9	1	8	107:98	19:17
6.	SC Riessersee	18	8	1	9	85:75	17:19
7.	ESG Kassel	18	8	1	9	87:108	17:19
8.	EC Bad Nauheim	18	5	1	2	103:118	11:25
9.	Augsburger EV	18	3	2	13	92:139	8:28
10.	EV Füssen	18	2	0	16	69:133	4:32

== Playoffs ==
=== Quarterfinals ===
			Series	1	2	3	4	5
SB Rosenheim	–	EV Landshut	3:1	3:1	2:4	8:2	8:2	–
Kölner EC	–	Schwenninger ERC	3:0	8:3	4:3 OT	9:0	–	–
Düsseldorfer EG	–	ECD Iserlohn	3:0	4:3	8:7 OT	7:4	–	–
Mannheimer ERC	–	ESV Kaufbeuren	3:1	4:0	5:4	4:5 OT	5:1	–

=== Semifinals ===
			Series	1	2	3	4	5
Kölner EC	–	Düsseldorfer EG	3:0	8:1	9:1	7:3	–	–
SB Rosenheim	–	Mannheimer ERC	0:3	2:3 OT	1:3	3:4	–	–

=== 3rd place ===
			Series	1	2
Düsseldorfer EG	–	SB Rosenheim	12:10	5:5	7:5

=== Final ===
			Series	1	2	3	4	5
Kölner EC	–	Mannheimer ERC	3:0	5:0	6:2	9:2	–	–
