= Udo Kießling =

German ice hockey player (born 1955)

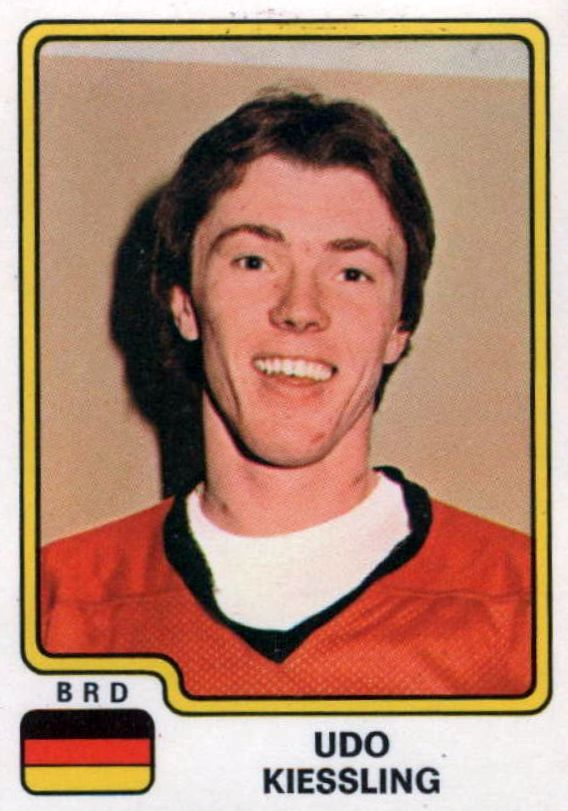
- Born: 21 May 1955 (age 71) Crimmitschau, East Germany
- Height: 5 ft 10 in (178 cm)
- Weight: 180 lb (82 kg; 12 st 12 lb)
- Position: Defence
- Shot: Left
- Played for: 1.GBun; SC Riessersee; Augsburger EV; EV Rosenheim; Kölner EC; Düsseldorfer EG; EV Füssen; EV Landshut; NHL; Minnesota North Stars; DEL; EV Landshut
- National team: West Germany
- Playing career: 1972–1996
Medal record
Men's ice hockey
Representing West Germany
Olympic Games
Bronze medal – third place	1976 Innsbruck	Team

Udo Kießling (born 21 May 1955) is a German retired ice hockey player. He competed at all Winter Olympics from 1976 to 1992, thus becoming the first ice hockey player to compete at five Olympics. He represented West Germany at the 1984 Canada Cup. He also played one game for the Minnesota North Stars on 13 March 1982, becoming the first German-trained player to appear in the NHL. He never played another NHL game. He was inducted into the International Ice Hockey Federation Hall of Fame in 2000.

== Career statistics ==
=== Regular season and playoffs ===
			Regular season					Playoffs
Season	Team	League	GP	G	A	Pts	PIM	GP	G	A	Pts	PIM
1972–73	SC Riessersee	1.GBun	40	8	6	14	44	—	—	—	—	—
1973–74	Augsburger EV	1.GBun	36	16	6	22	52	—	—	—	—	—
1974–75	EV Rosenheim	1.GBun	34	20	18	38	73	—	—	—	—	—
1975–76	EV Rosenheim	1.GBun	34	30	22	52	72	—	—	—	—	—
1976–77	Kölner EC	1.GBun	46	13	21	34	143	—	—	—	—	—
1977–78	Kölner EC	1.GBun	39	16	18	34	48	—	—	—	—	—
1978–79	Kölner EC	1.GBun	40	28	32	60	78	—	—	—	—	—
1979–80	Düsseldorfer EG	1.GBun	48	39	44	83	84	7	2	2	4	10
1980–81	Düsseldorfer EG	1.GBun	39	14	29	43	93	11	8	4	12	22
1981–82	Düsseldorfer EG	1.GBun	38	15	22	37	54	2	0	0	0	7
1982–83	EV Füssen	1.GBun	21	12	13	25	52	—	—	—	—	—
1982–83	Kölner EC	1.GBun	9	4	0	4	2	8	3	7	10	8
1982–83	Minnesota North Stars	NHL	1	0	0	0	2	—	—	—	—	—
1983–84	Kölner EC	1.GBun	37	9	16	25	64	8	0	3	3	10
1984–85	Kölner EC	1.GBun	36	14	26	40	38	9	4	10	14	22
1985–86	Kölner EC	1.GBun	27	13	18	31	24	10	5	8	13	17
1986–87	Kölner EC	1.GBun	42	10	34	44	70	—	—	—	—	—
1987–88	Kölner EC	1.GBun	35	9	20	29	54	11	3	7	10	22
1988–89	Kölner EC	1.GBun	31	11	24	35	38	9	6	4	10	8
1989–90	Kölner EC	1.GBun	35	7	15	22	45	8	1	2	3	10
1990–91	Kölner EC	1.GBun	35	7	13	20	36	14	2	4	6	18
1991–92	Kölner EC	1.GBun	42	11	23	34	38	4	2	0	2	2
1992–93	EV Landshut	1.GBun	44	9	19	28	50	—	—	—	—	—
1993–94	EV Landshut	1.GBun	44	3	16	19	74	6	1	5	6	10
1994–95	EV Landshut	DEL	41	7	17	24	42	18	3	7	10	22
1995–96	EV Landshut	DEL	50	3	19	22	44	7	0	2	2	4
1.GBun totals			798	298	437	735	1253	114	37	57	94	176
DEL totals			91	10	36	46	86	25	3	9	12	26

=== International ===
Year	Team	Event	GP	G	A	Pts	PIM
1973	West Germany	WC	10	0	0	0	6
1974	West Germany	WC B	7	1	2	3	8
1975	West Germany	WC B	7	1	3	4	8
1976	West Germany	OLY	5	0	1	1	6
1976	West Germany	WC	10	0	1	1	8
1977	West Germany	WC	10	0	5	5	10
1978	West Germany	WC	10	0	5	5	10
1979	West Germany	WC	8	2	4	6	14
1980	West Germany	OLY	5	2	2	4	6
1982	West Germany	WC	7	1	3	4	12
1983	West Germany	WC	4	0	1	1	10
1984	West Germany	WC	6	3	1	4	4
1984	West Germany	CC	4	0	1	1	4
1985	West Germany	WC	10	0	3	3	16
1986	West Germany	WC	10	4	2	6	22
1987	West Germany	WC	10	5	3	8	18
1988	West Germany	OLY	8	1	5	6	18
1989	West Germany	WC	10	2	0	2	12
1990	West Germany	WC	10	2	2	4	10
1991	Germany	WC	10	0	1	1	6
1992	Germany	OLY	8	0	0	0	6
Senior totals			169	24	45	69	214

== See also ==
- List of players who played only one game in the NHL
