= Joachim Reil =

German ice hockey player

- Born: 17 May 1955 (age 71) Garmisch-Partenkirchen, West Germany
- Height: 5 ft 10 in (178 cm)
- Weight: 183 lb (83 kg; 13 st 1 lb)
- Position: Defense
- Shot: Left
- Played for: SC Riessersee; ECD Iserlohn; Mannheimer ERC; Sportbund DJK Rosenheim
- National team: West Germany
- NHL draft: Undrafted
- Playing career: 1974–1996

Joachim Reil (born 17 May 1955) is a retired German ice hockey player. He competed in the men's tournaments at the 1980 Winter Olympics, the 1984 Winter Olympics and the 1988 Winter Olympics.

== Career statistics ==
			Regular season					Playoffs
Season	Team	League	GP	G	A	Pts	PIM	GP	G	A	Pts	PIM
1974–75	SC Riessersee	Germany	30	6	1	7	63	—	—	—	—	—
1975–76	SC Riessersee	Germany	22	7	4	11	64	—	—	—	—	—
1976–77	SC Riessersee	Germany	48	9	7	16	102	—	—	—	—	—
1977–78	SC Riessersee	Germany	44	8	9	17	84	—	—	—	—	—
1978–79	SC Riessersee	Germany	50	14	11	25	133	—	—	—	—	—
1979–80	SC Riessersee	Germany	48	17	15	32	62	—	—	—	—	—
1980–81	SC Riessersee	Germany	44	14	15	29	79	10	4	2	6	18
1981–82	SC Riessersee	Germany	43	12	19	31	81	2	0	0	0	4
1982–83	SC Riessersee	Germany	36	9	15	24	47	—	—	—	—	—
1983–84	ECD Iserlohn	Germany	46	9	18	27	56	—	—	—	—	—
1984–85	ECD Iserlohn	Germany	29	4	12	16	41	—	—	—	—	—
1985–86	Mannheimer ERC	Germany	21	3	6	9	22	—	—	—	—	—
1986–87	Mannheimer ERC	Germany	33	5	15	20	27	10	0	1	1	10
1987–88	Sportbund DJK Rosenheim	Germany	35	8	7	15	46	14	1	2	3	31
1988–89	Sportbund DJK Rosenheim	Germany	30	4	15	19	36	11	0	1	1	8
1989–90	Sportbund DJK Rosenheim	Germany	36	4	11	15	18	11	0	2	2	8
1990–91	Sportbund DJK Rosenheim	Germany	44	5	21	26	30	11	0	4	4	8
1991–92	Sportbund DJK Rosenheim	Germany	43	0	2	2	14	10	0	0	0	0
1992–93	Sportbund DJK Rosenheim	Germany2	52	11	36	47	87	—	—	—	—	—
1993–94	Sportbund DJK Rosenheim	Germany	43	4	10	14	37	—	—	—	—	—
1994–95	Star Bulls Rosenheim	DEL	40	0	2	2	26	6	0	0	0	0
1995–96	Star Bulls Rosenheim	DEL	1	0	0	0	0	—	—	—	—	—
DEL totals			725	142	213	355	1,042	85	5	13	18	91
