= 1941 German Ice Hockey Championship =

The 1941 German Ice Hockey Championship was the 25th season of the German Ice Hockey Championship, the national championship of Germany. SC Riessersee won the championship by defeating LTTC Rot-Weiß Berlin in the final.

== First round ==
=== Group A ===
	Club	GP	W	T	L	GF–GA	Pts
1.	Wiener EG	2	2	0	0	4:1	4:0
2.	SC Brandenburg Berlin	2	1	0	1	4:2	2:2
3.	VfK Königsberg	2	0	0	2	1:6	0:4

=== Group B ===
	Club	GP	W	T	L	GF–GA	Pts
1.	Berliner Schlittschuhclub	2	2	0	0	10:1	4:0
2.	Düsseldorfer EG	2	1	0	1	6:4	2:2
3.	Troppauer EV	2	0	0	2	3:14	0:4

=== Group C ===
	Club	GP	W	T	L	GF–GA	Pts
1.	LTTC Rot-Weiß Berlin	2	2	0	0	24:1	4:0
2.	Klagenfurter AC	2	1	0	1	5:9	2:2
3.	TSV Weißwasser	2	0	0	2	1:20	0:4

=== Group D ===
	Club	GP	W	T	L	GF–GA	Pts
1.	SC Riessersee	2	2	0	0	5:1	4:0
2.	Mannheimer ERC	2	1	0	1	2:1	2:2
3.	ESV Füssen	2	0	0	2	1:6	0:4

== Semifinals ==
in Garmisch-Partenkirchen	SC Riessersee	–	Berliner Schlittschuhclub	1:0
in München	LTTC Rot-Weiß Berlin	–	Wiener EG	2:1

== Final ==
SC Riessersee	–	LTTC Rot-Weiß Berlin	2:1
