= 2024–25 DEL2 season =

- League: DEL2
- Sport: Ice Hockey
- Duration: 13 September 2024 – 29 April 2025
- Number of games: 364 (52 per team)
- Number of teams: 14
- TV partner(s): Sportdeutschland.TV

Regular season
- Season champions: EC Kassel Huskies
- Top scorer: Max Newton (Krefeld Pinguine)
- Promoted to DEL: Dresdner Eislöwen
- Relegated to Oberliga: Selber Wölfe

Playoffs
- Champions: Dresdner Eislöwen
- Runners-up: Ravensburg Towerstars

DEL2 seasons
- ← 2023–24 2025–26 →

The 2024–25 DEL2 season was the twelfth season of play for DEL2, the second tier of professional ice hockey in Germany. The regular season ran from 13 September 2024 to 2 March 2025 with EC Kassel Huskies finishing atop the standings. The postseason ran from 5 March 2025 to 29 April 2025 with the Dresdner Eislöwen defeating the Ravensburg Towerstars 4 games to 3 to win the championship and earn a promotion to the DEL. The Selber Wölfe were relegated to the Oberliga.

== Membership changes ==
- Bietigheim Steelers were relegated to the Oberliga and replaced by Blue Devils Weiden.

== Teams ==
DEL2 teams for the 2024–25 season.

2024–25 DEL2 teams
Team	City	Arena	Head Coach
Blue Devils Weiden	(Bavaria) Weiden	Hans-Schröpf-Arena	(Germany) Sebastian Buchwieser
Dresdner Eislöwen	(Saxony) Dresden	EnergieVerbund Arena	(Sweden) Niklas Sundblad
EC Bad Nauheim	(Hesse) Bad Nauheim	Colonel-Knight-Stadion	(Belgium) Mike Pellegrims
EC Kassel Huskies	(Hesse) Kassel	Eissporthalle Kassel	(Canada) Todd Woodcroft
EHC Freiburg	(Baden-Württemberg) Freiburg	Franz Siegel Stadion	(Finland) Timo Saarikoski
Eisbären Regensburg	(Bavaria) Regensburg	Donau Arena	(Finland) Ville Hämäläinen
Eispiraten Crimmitschau	(Saxony) Crimmitschau	Eisstadion im Sahnpark	(Finland) Jussi Tuores
ESV Kaufbeuren	(Bavaria) Kaufbeuren	Erdgas Schwaben Arena	(Czech Republic) Daniel Jun
EV Landshut	(Bavaria) Landshut	Eisstadion am Gutenbergweg	(Germany) Heiko Vogler
Krefeld Pinguine	(North Rhine-Westphalia) Krefeld	Yayla Arena	(Germany) Thomas Popiesch
Lausitzer Füchse	(Saxony) Weißwasser	Eisstadion Weißwasser	(Germany) Christof Kreutzer
Ravensburg Towerstars	(Baden-Württemberg) Ravensburg	Eissporthalle Ravensburg	(Czech Republic) Bohuslav Subr
Selber Wölfe	(Bavaria) Selb	Hutschenreuther Eissporthalle	(Canada) Craig Streu
Starbulls Rosenheim	(Bavaria) Rosenheim	Rofa-Stadion	(Finland) Jari Pasanen

== Regular season ==
Pos	Team	Pld	W	OTW	OTL	L	GF	GA	GD	Pts	Qualification or relegation
1	EC Kassel Huskies	52	28	6	5	13	165	108	+57	101	Championship Playoffs
2	Krefeld Pinguine	52	25	11	2	14	186	129	+57	99	Championship Playoffs
3	Ravensburg Towerstars	52	26	7	6	13	180	143	+37	98	Championship Playoffs
4	Dresdner Eislöwen	52	25	6	10	11	163	136	+27	97	Championship Playoffs
5	Starbulls Rosenheim	52	23	7	7	15	158	132	+26	90	Championship Playoffs
6	EV Landshut	52	18	11	7	16	163	138	+25	83	Championship Playoffs
7	Blue Devils Weiden	52	22	3	5	22	158	166	−8	77	Championship Pre-playoffs
8	Lausitzer Füchse	52	22	3	4	23	135	153	−18	76	Championship Pre-playoffs
9	EHC Freiburg	52	18	5	7	22	149	168	−19	71	Championship Pre-playoffs
10	EC Bad Nauheim	52	15	6	12	19	154	155	−1	69	Championship Pre-playoffs
11	ESV Kaufbeuren	52	18	4	3	27	152	195	−43	65	Relegation Playdowns
12	Eispiraten Crimmitschau	52	14	6	7	25	131	170	−39	61	Relegation Playdowns
13	Eisbären Regensburg	52	13	5	7	27	131	181	−50	56	Relegation Playdowns
14	Selber Wölfe	52	9	8	6	29	133	184	−51	49	Relegation Playdowns

Source: www.kicker.de www.del-2.org
Rules for classification:
Tie-break: 1) points; 2) goal difference; 3) number of goals scored
Points: 3 points for regulation win; 2 points for OT or SO win; 1 point for OT or SO loss; 0 points for regulation loss

== Statistics ==
=== Scoring leaders ===
List shows the top skaters sorted by points, then goals.

Player	Team	POS	GP	G	A	PTS	PIM
Max Newton	Krefeld Pinguine	C/LW	50	24	45	69	55
Robbie Czarnik	Ravensburg Towerstars	C/W	47	28	36	64	28
Mathew Santos	Ravensburg Towerstars	LW/RW	48	29	34	63	35
C. J. Stretch	Starbulls Rosenheim	C	52	13	46	59	48
Tyler Ward	Blue Devils Weiden	LW	51	27	30	57	4
Tomáš Rubeš	Blue Devils Weiden	C	52	21	36	57	14
Erik Jinesjö Karlsson	Ravensburg Towerstars	C	50	15	41	56	18
Davis Vandane	Krefeld Pinguine	D	51	15	41	56	12
Tor Immo	EV Landshut	LW/RW	49	21	34	55	28
Tristan Keck	EC Kassel Huskies	LW	52	38	16	54	8

=== Leading goaltenders ===
Only the top five goaltenders, based on save percentage, who have played at least 1/3 of their team's minutes, are included in this list.

Player	Team	GP	TOI	W	L	GA	SA	SO	GAA	SV%
Brandon Maxwell	EC Kassel Huskies	33	1972	21	12	68	810	5	2.07	.923
Oskar Autio	Starbulls Rosenheim	40	2424	25	14	87	1172	6	2.15	.931
Danny aus den Birken	Dresdner Eislöwen	28	1699	17	11	63	699	2	2.23	.917
Felix Bick	Krefeld Pinguine	45	2718	32	12	105	1181	3	2.32	.918
Jonas Langmann	EV Landshut	39	2236	22	16	93	912	2	2.50	.908

== Playoffs ==
=== Championship ===
Pre-playoffs (best-of-3)
7	Blue Devils Weiden	6**	2	3
10	EC Bad Nauheim	5	3*	2
8	Lausitzer Füchse	5	3	-
9	EHC Freiburg	3	2	-

Quarterfinals (best-of-7)
1	EC Kassel Huskies	2	3	3	3	-	-	-
9	EHC Freiburg	1	1	1	1	-	-	-
2	Krefeld Pinguine	1	3	7	2	6	5*	-
7	Blue Devils Weiden	5	2	1	4	3	4	-
3	Ravensburg Towerstars	2	4	4*	3*	6	4	-
6	EV Landshut	4	5	3	2	2	2	-
4	Dresdner Eislöwen	3	2	4	1	5	-	-
5	Starbulls Rosenheim	1	0	1	2*	1	-	-

Semifinals (best-of-7)
1	EC Kassel Huskies	0	4*	1	3	4	0	-
4	Dresdner Eislöwen	1	3	2**	4	3	4	-
(Pairings are re-seeded after the first and second round)
2	Krefeld Pinguine	5	5	8	2	3	2	-
3	Ravensburg Towerstars	1	6*	1	3*	5	3*	-

Championship (best-of-7)
4	Dresdner Eislöwen	2	5	5	4	4	2	2*
3	Ravensburg Towerstars	4	1	2	0	7	4	1

Note: * denotes overtime period(s)

=== Relegation ===
Semifinals (best-of-7)
11	ESV Kaufbeuren	7	3	1	0	6	4	?
14	Selber Wölfe	2	4	2	1	2	2	?
12	Eispiraten Crimmitschau	3	2	1	5	4	1	4
13	Eisbären Regensburg	2	5	4	3	1	2	0

Finals (best-of-7)
14	Selber Wölfe	1	3	1	3	-	-	-
13	Eisbären Regensburg	2	4*	2	4	-	-	-

Note: * denotes overtime period(s)
