= 1942 German Ice Hockey Championship =

The 1942 German Ice Hockey Championship was the 26th season of the German Ice Hockey Championship, the national championship of Germany. 12 teams participated in the first round. The championship was abandoned after the first round, and no champion was declared.

== First round ==
=== Group A ===
	Club	GP	W	T	L	GF–GA	Pts
1.	Wiener EG	2	2	0	0	4:2	4:0
2.	Düsseldorfer EG	2	1	0	1	12:4	2:2
3.	NSTG Komotau	2	0	0	2	1:11	0:4

=== Group B ===
	Club	GP	W	T	L	GF–GA	Pts
1.	LTTC Rot-Weiß Berlin	2	2	0	0	12:1	4:0
2.	ESV Füssen	2	1	0	1	4:2	2:2
3.	KSG VfK Königsberg / Rastenburger SV	2	0	0	2	1:14	0:4

=== Group C ===
	Club	GP	W	T	L	GF–GA	Pts
1.	Mannheimer ERC	2	2	0	0	16:0	4:0
2.	Berliner Schlittschuhclub	2	1	0	1	21:11	2:2
3.	TSV Weißwasser	2	0	0	2	0:26	0:4

=== Group D ===
	Club	GP	W	T	L	GF–GA	Pts
1.	SC Riessersee	2	2	0	0	20:0	4:0
2.	Klagenfurter AC	2	1	0	1	7:4	2:2
3.	EV Teschen	2	0	0	2	2:25	0:4
