= 1934 German Ice Hockey Championship =

The 1934 German Ice Hockey Championship was the 18th season of the German Ice Hockey Championship, the national championship of Germany. SC Brandenburg Berlin won the championship by defeating SC Riessersee in the final.

== First round ==
SC Forsthausstraße Frankfurt	–	Bobclub Erfurt	6:0
SC Riessersee	–	SV Schierke	21:0
ESV Füssen	–	Altonaer SV	10:0
SC Meiningen	–	EV Hindenburg	3:1
VfL Rastenburg	–	Blau-Weiß Dresden	3:0
SV Rastenburg	–	Berliner EC	2:0
SC Brandenburg Berlin	–	Berliner HC	2:1

== Quarterfinals ==
SC Riessersee	–	VfL Rastenburg	3:0
ESV Füssen	–	SC Forsthausstraße Frankfurt	3:0
Berliner Schlittschuhclub	–	SC Meiningen	21:0
SC Brandenburg Berlin	–	SV Rastenburg	3:1

== Semifinals ==
SC Riessersee	–	ESV Füssen	2:0
SC Brandenburg Berlin	–	Berliner Schlittschuhclub	1:0

== 3rd place ==
ESV Füssen	–	Berliner Schlittschuhclub	3:1

== Final ==
SC Brandenburg Berlin	–	SC Riessersee	1:0 (0:0, 0:0, 1:0)

== Losers round ==
Blau-Weiß Dresden	–	Bobclub Erfurt	4:1
Berliner HC	–	SV Schierke	2:0
Berliner EC	–	Altonaer SV	3:0

Blau-Weiß Dresden	–	Berliner HC	2:1
Berliner EC	–	EV Hindenburg	1:0

Berliner EC	–	Blau-Weiß Dresden	2:1
