= 1943 German Ice Hockey Championship =

The 1943 German Ice Hockey Championship was the 27th season of the German Ice Hockey Championship, the national championship of Germany. The championship was abandoned after the first semifinal.

== First round ==
| Mannheimer ERC | – | Düsseldorfer EG | 2:1 OT |
| EV Krakau | – | Wiener EG | 0:5 |
| SC Riessersee | – | SS Nürnberg | 9:1 |
| NSTG Prag | – | LTTC Rot-Weiß Berlin | 0:7 |
| Klagenfurter AC | – | EV Bielitz | 6:0 |
| SC Brandenburg Berlin | – | ERC Posen | 15:0 |
| Berliner Schlittschuhclub | – | VfL Rastenburg | 5:0 |

== Quarterfinals ==
| Mannheimer ERC | – | Berliner Schlittschuhclub | 3:1 |
| LTTC Rot-Weiß Berlin | – | SC Brandenburg Berlin | 6:2 |
| Klagenfurter AC | – | ERV Breslau | 18:0 |
| SC Riessersee | – | Wiener EG | 5:4 OT |

== Semifinals ==
| SC Riessersee | – | Klagenfurter AC | 1:0 |
