= 1939 German Ice Hockey Championship =

The 1939 German Ice Hockey Championship was the 23rd season of the German Ice Hockey Championship, the national championship of Germany. EK Engelmann Wien won the championship by defeating Berliner Schlittschuhclub in the final.

== First round ==
=== Group A ===
	Club	GP	W	T	L	GF–GA	Pts
1.	EK Engelmann Wien	4	3	0	1	11:2	6:2
2.	Berliner Schlittschuhclub	4	3	0	1	7:5	6:2
3.	Rastenburger SV	4	2	0	2	7:6	4:4
4.	ESV Füssen	4	1	1	2	3:6	3:5
5.	LTTC Rot-Weiß Berlin	4	0	1	3	5:13	1:7

=== Group B ===
	Club	GP	W	T	L	GF–GA	Pts
1.	SC Riessersee	4	3	1	0	9:2	7:1
2.	Düsseldorfer EG	4	2	1	1	13:8	5:3
3.	Zehlendorfer Wespen	4	2	0	2	7:7	4:4
4.	Klagenfurter AC	4	2	0	2	3:11	4:4
5.	Krefelder EV	4	0	0	4	8:16	0:8

== Semifinals ==
Berliner Schlittschuhclub	–	Düsseldorfer EG	2:1
EK Engelmann Wien	–	Zehlendorfer Wespen	9:0

== 3rd place ==
Düsseldorfer EG	–	Zehlendorfer Wespen	1:0

== Final ==
EK Engelmann Wien	–	Berliner Schlittschuhclub	1:0
