= 1940 German Ice Hockey Championship =

The 1940 German Ice Hockey Championship was the 24th season of the German Ice Hockey Championship, the national championship of Germany. 10 teams participated in the championship, and Wiener EG won the title.

== First round ==
=== Group A ===
	Club	GP	W	T	L	GF–GA	Pts
1.	Düsseldorfer EG	4	3	1	0	8:3	7:1
2.	Berliner Schlittschuhclub	4	2	2	0	7:3	6:2
3.	Rastenburger EV	4	1	1	2	6:7	3:5
4.	KSG Preußen / Wespen	4	1	0	3	6:7	2:6
5.	Krefelder EV	4	1	0	3	5:13	2:6

=== Group B ===
	Club	GP	W	T	L	GF–GA	Pts
1.	Wiener EG	4	3	0	1	14:3	6:2
2.	SC Riessersee	4	3	0	1	8:2	6:2
3.	Klagenfurter AC	4	2	0	2	8:13	4:4
4.	ESV Füssen	4	1	1	2	8:5	3:5
5.	Troppauer EV	4	0	1	3	2:17	1:7

== Final round ==
	Club	GP	W	T	L	GF–GA	Pts
1.	Wiener EG	3	2	1	0	6:4	5:1
2.	Berliner Schlittschuhclub	3	1	1	1	3:3	3:3
3.	SC Riessersee	3	0	2	1	4:5	2:4
4.	Düsseldorfer EG	3	0	2	1	2:3	2:4
