= 1938 German Ice Hockey Championship =

The 1938 German Ice Hockey Championship was the 22nd season of the German Ice Hockey Championship, the national championship of Germany. Eight teams participated in the championship, and SC Riessersee won the title.

== First round ==
=== Group A ===
	Club	GP	W	T	L	GF–GA	Pts
1.	SC Riessersee	3	2	1	0	10:2	5:1
2.	Düsseldorfer EG	3	2	1	0	13:1	5:1
3.	SC Brandenburg Berlin	3	1	0	2	2:8	2:4
4.	Altonaer SV	3	0	0	3	1:15	0:6

=== Group B ===
	Club	GP	W	T	L	GF–GA	Pts
1.	Berliner Schlittschuhclub	3	2	1	0	17:7	5:1
2.	ESV Füssen	3	2	1	0	12:7	5:1
3.	Rastenburger SV	3	1	0	2	5:6	2:4
4.	Blau-Weiß Dresden	3	0	0	3	1:15	0:6

== Final round ==
	Club	GP	W	T	L	GF–GA	Pts
1.	SC Riessersee	3	2	0	1	4:1	4:2
2.	Berliner Schlittschuhclub	3	2	0	1	4:2	4:2
3.	Düsseldorfer EG	3	2	0	1	4:2	4:2
4.	ESV Füssen	3	0	0	3	0:7	0:6

== 2nd place game ==
Düsseldorfer EG	–	Berliner Schlittschuhclub	3:0
