= 1935 German Ice Hockey Championship =

The 1935 German Ice Hockey Championship was the 19th season of the German Ice Hockey Championship, the national championship of Germany. SC Riessersee won the championship by defeating ESV Fussen in the final.

== Qualification round ==
Berliner Schlittschuhclub	–	Altonaer SV	8:0
SC Riessersee	–	VfK Königsberg	9:1
Berliner EC	–	Berliner HC	3:2
SV Rastenburg	–	SC Meiningen	12:1
SC Brandenburg Berlin	–	SEV Schwenningen	7:3

== First round ==
=== Group A ===
	Club	GP	W	T	L	GF–GA	Pts
1.	ESV Füssen	2	2	0	0	8:0	4:0
2.	Berliner EC	2	1	0	1	2:3	2:2
3.	Berliner Schlittschuhclub	2	0	0	2	0:7	0:4

=== Group B ===
	Club	GP	W	T	L	GF–GA	Pts
1.	Rastenburger SV	2	1	1	0	3:0	3:1
2.	SC Riessersee	2	1	1	0	1:0	3:1
3.	SC Brandenburg Berlin	2	0	0	2	0:4	0:4

=== Group B Tiebreak ===
SC Riessersee	–	Rastenburger SV	1:0 OT

== Final ==
SC Riessersee	–	ESV Füssen	2:1

== Losers round ==
SC Meiningen	–	Berliner HC	7:0

VfK Königsberg	–	SC Meiningen	3:0
