= Doug Gibson (ice hockey) =

Canadian ice hockey player

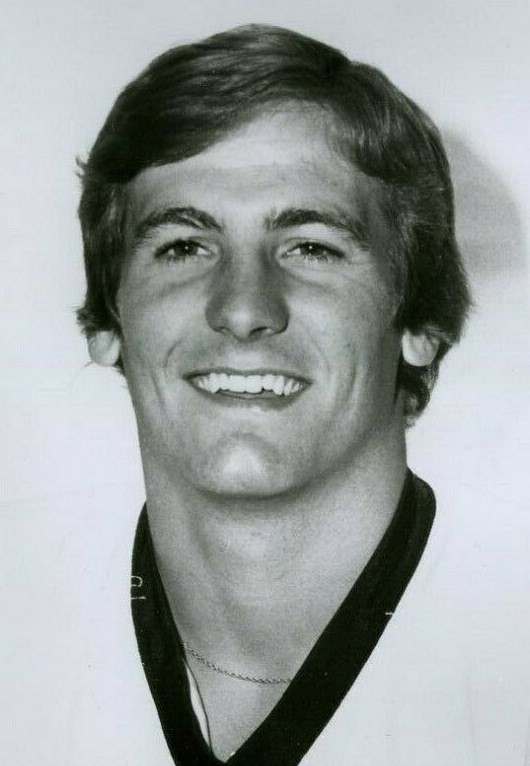
- Born: September 28, 1953 (age 72) Peterborough, Ontario, Canada
- Height: 5 ft 10 in (178 cm)
- Weight: 170 lb (77 kg; 12 st 2 lb)
- Position: Centre
- Shot: Right
- Played for: Boston Bruins; Washington Capitals; SC Riessersee; VEU Feldkirch
- NHL draft: 36th overall, 1973; Boston Bruins
- WHA draft: 34th overall, 1973; Los Angeles Sharks
- Playing career: 1973–1983

Douglas John Gibson (born September 28, 1953) is a Canadian former professional ice hockey player.

== Early life ==
Gibson was born in Peterborough, Ontario.

== Career ==
Selected in 1973 by the Boston Bruins of the National Hockey League and the Los Angeles Sharks of the World Hockey Association, Gibson spent most of his first two professional seasons in the Bruins' minor-league hockey system. In the 1975–76 season, he played with the Bruins, and scored his first NHL goal on November 25 in a 4-2 Boston home victory over Los Angeles. Gibson returned to the minors in the following season. After Boston waived Gibson in 1977, he played briefly for the Washington Capitals. While in the Washington organization, Gibson played with the Hershey Bears where he assumed the player-coach role and led the team to a Calder Cup Championship taking the title in 1979-80. He holds the distinction of never having spent any time in the penalty box, in his 63 NHL games played.

After retiring, Gibson worked an amateur scout for the New York Islanders and a professional scout with the Montreal Canadiens.

== Career statistics ==
| | | | Regular season | | | | | Playoffs |
| Season | Team | League | GP | G | A | Pts | PIM | GP | G | A | Pts | PIM |
|---|---|---|---|---|---|---|---|---|---|---|---|---|
| 1970–71 | Peterborough Petes | OHA-Jr. | 60 | 27 | 43 | 70 | 13 | 5 | 2 | 3 | 5 | 0 |
| 1971–72 | Peterborough Petes | OHA-Jr. | 63 | 51 | 48 | 99 | 15 | 15 | 16 | 13 | 29 | 14 |
| 1971–72 | Peterborough Petes | M-Cup | — | — | — | — | — | 3 | 3 | 3 | 6 | 2 |
| 1972–73 | Peterborough Petes | OHA-Jr. | 63 | 52 | 62 | 114 | 10 | 14 | 9 | 13 | 22 | 6 |
| 1973–74 | Boston Bruins | NHL | 2 | 0 | 0 | 0 | 0 | 1 | 0 | 0 | 0 | 0 |
| 1973–74 | Boston Braves | AHL | 76 | 31 | 51 | 82 | 16 | — | — | — | — | — |
| 1974–75 | Rochester Americans | AHL | 75 | 44 | 72 | 116 | 31 | 12 | 5 | 7 | 12 | 15 |
| 1975–76 | Boston Bruins | NHL | 50 | 7 | 18 | 25 | 0 | — | — | — | — | — |
| 1975–76 | Rochester Americans | AHL | 17 | 11 | 20 | 31 | 11 | — | — | — | — | — |
| 1976–77 | Rochester Americans | AHL | 78 | 41 | 56 | 97 | 11 | 12 | 5 | 10 | 15 | 2 |
| 1977–78 | Washington Capitals | NHL | 11 | 2 | 1 | 3 | 0 | — | — | — | — | — |
| 1977–78 | Hershey Bears | AHL | 71 | 24 | 35 | 59 | 8 | — | — | — | — | — |
| 1978–79 | Hershey Bears | AHL | 22 | 8 | 13 | 21 | 10 | — | — | — | — | — |
| 1979–80 | Hershey Bears | AHL | 72 | 20 | 24 | 44 | 17 | 16 | 12 | 9 | 21 | 0 |
| 1980–81 | SC Riessersee | 1.GBun | 44 | 25 | 32 | 57 | 6 | 10 | 6 | 10 | 16 | 2 |
| 1981–82 | SC Riessersee | 1.GBun | 44 | 20 | 17 | 37 | 12 | 2 | 1 | 0 | 1 | 0 |
| 1982–83 | SC Riessersee | 1.GBun | 36 | 14 | 37 | 51 | 7 | — | — | — | — | — |
| 1983–84 | VEU Feldkirch | AUT | 20 | 27 | 12 | 39 | 137 | — | — | — | — | — |
| NHL totals | | | 63 | 9 | 19 | 28 | 0 | 1 | 0 | 0 | 0 | 0 |
| AHL totals | | | 411 | 179 | 271 | 450 | 104 | 40 | 22 | 26 | 48 | 17 |
| 1.GBun totals | | | 124 | 59 | 86 | 145 | 25 | 12 | 7 | 10 | 17 | 2 |
