= 1937 German Ice Hockey Championship =

The 1937 German Ice Hockey Championship was the 21st season of the German Ice Hockey Championship, the national championship of Germany. Berliner Schlittschuhclub won the championship by defeating SC Riessersee in the final.

== First round ==
=== Group A ===
| | Club | GP | W | T | L | GF–GA | Pts |
|---|---|---|---|---|---|---|---|
| 1. | Berliner Schlittschuhclub | 3 | 3 | 0 | 0 | 15:1 | 6:0 |
| 2. | HG Nürnberg | 3 | 2 | 0 | 1 | 16:5 | 4:2 |
| 3. | TSV Weißwasser | 3 | 1 | 0 | 2 | 4:21 | 2:4 |
| 4. | Altonaer SV | 3 | 0 | 0 | 3 | 2:10 | 0:6 |

=== Group B ===
| | Club | GP | W | T | L | GF–GA | Pts |
|---|---|---|---|---|---|---|---|
| 1. | SC Riessersee | 3 | 3 | 0 | 0 | 6:0 | 6:0 |
| 2. | Rastenburger SV | 3 | 2 | 0 | 1 | 8:2 | 4:2 |
| 3. | SC Brandenburg Berlin | 3 | 1 | 0 | 2 | 3:5 | 2:4 |
| 4. | EHC Crimmitschau | 3 | 0 | 0 | 3 | 0:10 | 0:6 |

=== Group C ===
| | Club | GP | W | T | L | GF–GA | Pts |
|---|---|---|---|---|---|---|---|
| 1. | Düsseldorfer EG | 3 | 2 | 1 | 0 | 7:2 | 5:1 |
| 2. | Zehlendorfer Wespen | 3 | 2 | 0 | 1 | 5:2 | 4:2 |
| 3. | ESV Füssen | 3 | 1 | 1 | 1 | 3:2 | 3:3 |
| 4. | VfK Königsberg | 3 | 0 | 0 | 3 | 3:12 | 0:6 |

== Final round ==
| | Club | GP | W | T | L | GF–GA | Pts |
|---|---|---|---|---|---|---|---|
| 1. | Berliner Schlittschuhclub | 2 | 1 | 1 | 0 | 5:1 | 3:1 |
| 2. | SC Riessersee | 2 | 1 | 1 | 0 | 3:2 | 3:1 |
| 3. | Düsseldorfer EG | 2 | 0 | 0 | 2 | 1:6 | 0:4 |

== Final ==
| Berliner Schlittschuhclub | – | SC Riessersee | 3:0 (1:0, 0:0, 2:0) |
