= Jiří Polák =

Czech ice hockey player

- Born: August 10, 1977 (age 48) Czechoslovakia
- Height: 5 ft 11 in (180 cm)
- Weight: 194 lb (88 kg; 13 st 12 lb)
- Position: Defence
- Shot: Left
- Played for: HC Olomouc; HC Karlovy Vary; HC Slavia Praha; HC Prostějov; HC Liberec; HC Vsetín; MHC Martin; HK Nitra; Saale Bulls Halle; HC Slovan Moravská Třebová; HC Přerov; HC Frýdek-Místek
- NHL draft: Undrafted
- Playing career: 1995–2017

Jiří Polák (born August 10, 1977) is a Czech ice hockey defenceman playing in Slovakia with HK Nitra of the Slovak Extraliga. He has also played 468 games in the Czech Extraliga.

== Career statistics ==
			Regular season					Playoffs
Season	Team	League	GP	G	A	Pts	PIM	GP	G	A	Pts	PIM
1995–96	HC Olomouc	Czech	36	1	0	1	45	2	0	0	0	0
1996–97	HC Olomouc	Czech	40	2	6	8	12	—	—	—	—	—
1997–98	HC Karlovy Vary	Czech	14	1	0	1	4	—	—	—	—	—
1998–99	HC Slavia Praha	Czech	40	0	2	2	22	—	—	—	—	—
1999–00	HC Slavia Praha	Czech	1	0	0	0	0	—	—	—	—	—
1999–00	HC Karlovy Vary	Czech	34	3	5	8	38	—	—	—	—	—
1999–00	HC Prostějov	Czech2	8	0	2	2	10	—	—	—	—	—
1999–00	HC Liberec	Czech2	6	0	1	1	4	—	—	—	—	—
2000–01	HC Karlovy Vary	Czech	52	3	5	8	32	—	—	—	—	—
2001–02	HC Vsetín	Czech	43	4	6	10	65	—	—	—	—	—
2002–03	HC Vsetín	Czech	52	2	6	8	32	4	0	0	0	4
2003–04	Vsetínská hokejová	Czech	52	6	6	12	52	—	—	—	—	—
2004–05	HC Energie Karlovy Vary	Czech	51	0	7	7	50	—	—	—	—	—
2005–06	HC Energie Karlovy Vary	Czech	51	0	1	1	32	—	—	—	—	—
2006–07	MHC Martin	Slovak	53	2	15	17	56	4	0	0	0	0
2007–08	MHC Martin	Slovak	31	0	4	4	20	7	0	1	1	16
2008–09	MHC Martin	Slovak	54	13	7	20	60	5	0	0	0	27
2009–10	MHC Martin	Slovak	44	4	10	14	34	12	1	3	4	16
2010–11	HK Nitra	Slovak	47	1	8	9	54	—	—	—	—	—
2011–12	HK Nitra	Slovak	23	0	1	1	12	—	—	—	—	—
2011–12	Saale Bulls Halle	Germany3	19	5	16	21	18	13	1	6	7	8
2012–13	HC Slovan Moravská Třebová	Czech4	23	5	12	17	44	5	0	2	2	20
2013–14	HC Slovan Moravská Třebová	Czech4	10	1	3	4	8	—	—	—	—	—
2013–14	LHK Jestřábi Prostějov	Czech3	23	2	10	12	18	12	0	6	6	18
2014–15	HC Přerov	Czech3	36	3	8	11	26	12	0	3	3	8
2015–16	HC Frýdek-Místek	Czech3	27	1	4	5	30	10	0	3	3	12
2016–17	HC Slovan Moravská Třebová	Czech4	18	2	5	7	18	11	2	8	10	10
Czech totals			466	22	44	66	384	6	0	0	0	4
Slovak totals			252	20	45	65	236	28	1	4	5	59
