= 1927 German Ice Hockey Championship =

The 1927 German Ice Hockey Championship was the 11th season of the German Ice Hockey Championship, the national championship of Germany. SC Riessersee won the championship by defeating SC Charlottenburg in the final.

== First round ==
ESV Füssen	–	Münchener EV	4:3

== Semifinals ==
SC Charlottenburg	–	ESV Füssen	5:3
SC Riessersee	–	HC Stuttgart	24:0

== Final ==
SC Riessersee	–	SC Charlottenburg	2:1 (2 OT)
