= 1929 German Ice Hockey Championship =

The 1929 German Ice Hockey Championship was the 13th season of the German Ice Hockey Championship, the national championship of Germany. Berliner Schlittschuhclub won the championship by defeating SC Riessersee in the final.

== First round ==
=== Group A ===
	Club	GP	W	T	L	GF–GA	Pts
1.	Berliner Schlittschuhclub	2	2	0	0	12:1	4:0
2.	ESV Füssen	2	1	0	1	6:2	2:2
3.	VdS Tilsit	2	0	0	2	2:17	0:4

=== Group B ===
	Club	GP	W	T	L	GF–GA	Pts
1.	SC Riessersee	2	2	0	0	11:0	4:0
2.	SC Brandenburg Berlin	2	1	0	1	6:2	2:2
3.	HC Stuttgart	2	0	0	2	0:15	0:4

== 3rd place ==
ESV Füssen	–	SC Brandenburg Berlin	0:4

== Final ==
Berliner Schlittschuhclub	–	SC Riessersee	2:1
