= 1972–73 ice hockey Bundesliga season =

German ice hockey season

The 1972–73 Ice hockey Bundesliga season was the 15th season of the Ice hockey Bundesliga, the top level of ice hockey in Germany. 11 teams participated in the league, and EV Fussen won the championship.

== Regular season ==
	Club	GP	W	T	L	GF–GA	Pts
1.	EV Füssen	40	30	2	8	201: 95	62:18
2.	Düsseldorfer EG	40	27	5	8	230:132	59:21
3.	EV Landshut	40	25	3	12	176:111	53:27
4.	VfL Bad Nauheim	40	23	1	16	175:157	47:33
5.	SC Riessersee	40	21	0	19	153:146	42:38
6.	Berliner SC	40	18	2	20	169:161	38:42
7.	EC Bad Tölz	40	15	5	20	116:135	35:45
8.	Krefelder EV	40	14	6	20	141:193	34:46
9.	Augsburger EV	40	14	5	21	154:194	33:47
10.	ESV Kaufbeuren	40	10	5	25	99:176	25:55
11.	EV Rosenheim	40	4	4	32	102:216	12:68
