= 1966–67 ice hockey Bundesliga season =

German ice hockey season

The 1966–67 Ice hockey Bundesliga season was the ninth season of the Ice hockey Bundesliga, the top level of ice hockey in Germany. 10 teams participated in the league, and Düsseldorfer EG won the championship. FC Bayern Munchen won the DEV-Pokal.

== First round ==
=== West ===
	Club	GP	W	T	L	GF–GA	Pts
1.	Düsseldorfer EG	16	11	2	3	93:42	24:8
2.	Mannheimer ERC	16	9	3	4	85:46	21:11
3.	Krefelder EV	16	9	1	6	69:50	19:13
4.	Preußen Krefeld	16	6	0	10	66:88	12:20
5.	Berliner SC (N)	16	2	0	14	33:120	4:28

=== South ===
	Club	GP	W	T	L	GF–GA	Pts
1.	EV Füssen	16	11	3	2	88:46	25:7
2.	EC Bad Tölz (M)	16	7	4	5	73:56	18:14
3.	EV Landshut	16	5	3	8	50:73	13:19
4.	SC Riessersee	16	5	3	8	52:61	13:19
5.	ESV Kaufbeuren	16	4	3	9	51:78	11:21

==== 3rd place ====
- EV Landshut – SC Riessersee 3:2

== Relegation round ==
=== West ===
	Club	GP	W	T	L	GF–GA	Pts
1.	Preußen Krefeld	8	6	1	1	58:27	13:3
2.	VfL Bad Nauheim	8	4	1	3	39:34	9:7
3.	Kölner EK	8	4	0	4	33:31	8:8
4.	Berliner SC	8	2	1	5	38:50	5:11
5.	Eintracht Frankfurt	8	2	1	5	37:63	5:11

=== South ===
	Club	GP	W	T	L	GF–GA	Pts
1.	FC Bayern München	8	6	1	1	32:21	13:3
2.	SG Oberstdorf/Sonthofen	8	4	1	3	28:30	9:7
3.	ESV Kaufbeuren	8	4	0	4	35:28	8:8
4.	SC Riessersee	8	2	2	4	31:28	6:10
5.	Augsburger EV	8	2	0	6	25:44	4:12

== DEV-Pokal ==
			Series	1	2
Preußen Krefeld	–	FC Bayern München	4:7	3:4	1:3

== Final round ==
	Club	GP	W	T	L	GF–GA	Pts
1.	Düsseldorfer EG	10	9	0	1	44:22	18:2
2	EC Bad Tölz (M)	10	7	0	3	53:22	14:6
3	EV Landshut	10	5	0	5	28:50	10:10
4	EV Füssen	10	4	0	6	31:33	8:12
5	Krefelder EV	10	4	0	6	32:44	8:12
6	Mannheimer ERC	10	1	0	9	22:39	2:18
