= Matthias Potthoff =

German ice hockey player

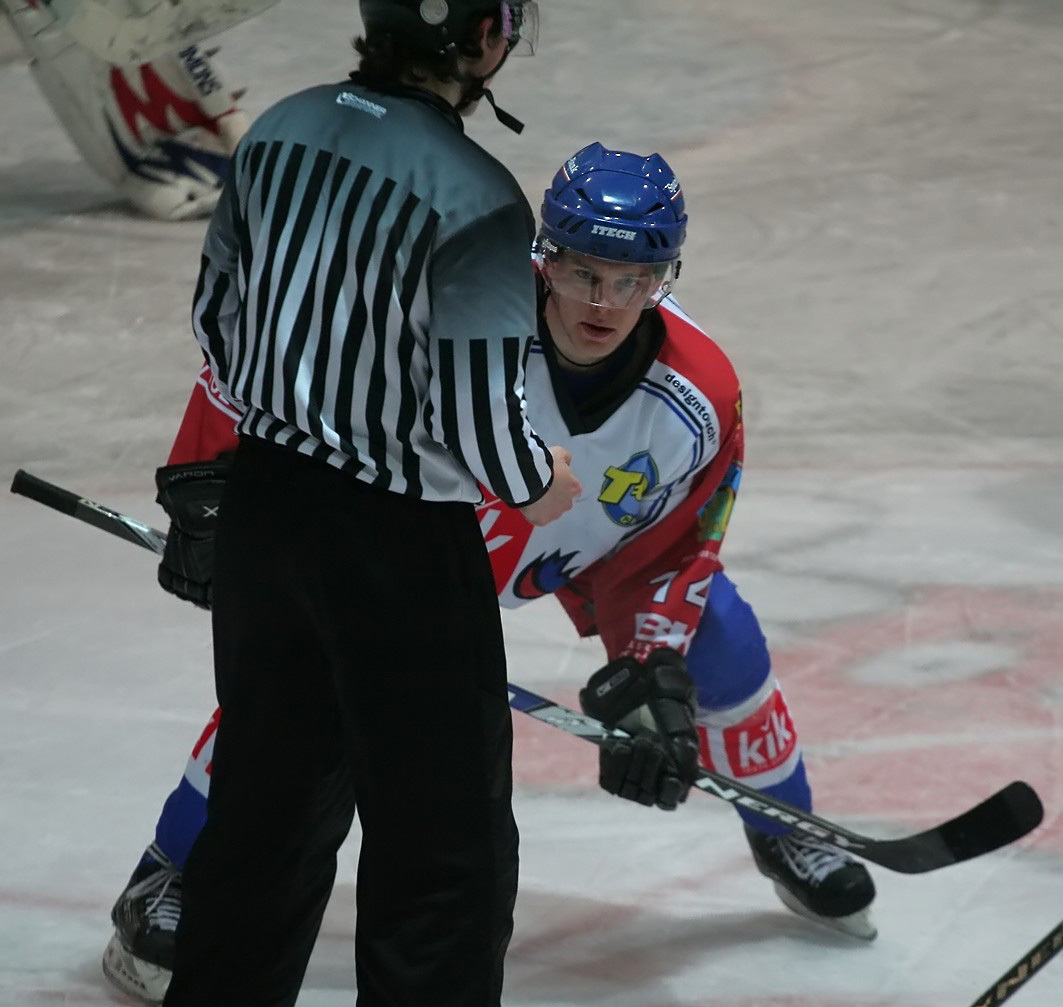
- EHC Dortmund - #14 - Matthias Potthoff
- Born: October 26, 1987 (age 38) Wickede, West Germany
- Height: 5 ft 10 in (178 cm)
- Weight: 192 lb (87 kg; 13 st 10 lb)
- Position: Left wing
- Shoots: Left
- Oberliga team Former teams: Lippe-Hockey-Hamm; Iserlohn Roosters; Revier Löwen; EHC Dortmund; Königsborner JEC
- Playing career: 2005–present

Matthias Potthoff (born October 26, 1987) is a German ice hockey forward currently playing for Lippe-Hockey-Hamm of the German Oberliga.

Potthoff began his career with the Kölner EC U18 team before signing for the Iserlohn Roosters of the Deutsche Eishockey Liga in 2005. He had a development spell in the German Oberliga for the Revier Löwen before joining the main squad. After two seasons he moved to EHC Dortmund and then played for Königsborner JEC before joining Lippe-Hockey-Hamm.
