= 1936 German Ice Hockey Championship =

The 1936 German Ice Hockey Championship was the 20th season of the German Ice Hockey Championship, the national championship of Germany. Berliner Schlittschuhclub won the championship by defeating SC Riessersee in the final.

== Quarterfinals ==
Berliner Schlittschuhclub	–	Stuttgarter ERC	7:0
SC Riessersee	–	HG Nürnberg	3:0
ESV Füssen	–	EV Hindenburg	18:0
SC Brandenburg Berlin	–	SV Rastenburg	3:0

== Semifinals ==
Berliner Schlittschuhclub	–	SC Brandenburg Berlin	1:0
SC Riessersee	–	ESV Füssen	1:0

== Final ==
Berliner Schlittschuhclub	–	SC Riessersee	2:1
