= 1948 German Ice Hockey Championship =

The 1948 German Ice Hockey Championship was the 30th season of the German Ice Hockey Championship, the national championship of Germany. The first round consisted of Northern and Southern sections. The top three teams from each section qualified for the final round. SC Riessersee won the championship.

== First round ==
=== North ===
| | Club | GP | W | T | L | GF–GA | Pts |
|---|---|---|---|---|---|---|---|
| 1. | VfL Bad Nauheim | 8 | 7 | 0 | 1 | 46:13 | 14:2 |
| 2. | Krefelder EV | 8 | 6 | 0 | 2 | 54:32 | 12:4 |
| 3. | Preußen Krefeld | 8 | 3 | 0 | 5 | 36:47 | 6:10 |
| 4. | Kölner EK | 8 | 2 | 1 | 5 | 28:50 | 5:11 |
| 5. | EG Hamburg | 8 | 1 | 1 | 6 | 16:38 | 3:13 |

=== South ===
| | Club | GP | W | T | L | Pts |
|---|---|---|---|---|---|---|
| 1. | SC Riessersee | 8 | 7 | 0 | 1 | 14:2 |
| 2. | EV Füssen | 8 | 6 | 0 | 2 | 12:4 |
| 3. | HC Augsburg | 8 | 5 | 0 | 3 | 10:6 |
| 4. | EV Tegernsee | 8 | 2 | 0 | 6 | 4:12 |
| 5. | SG Mannheim | 8 | 0 | 0 | 8 | 0:16 |

== Final round ==
| | Club | GP | W | T | L | GF–GA | Pts |
|---|---|---|---|---|---|---|---|
| 1. | SC Riessersee | 10 | 8 | 2 | 0 | 60:16 | 18:2 |
| 2. | VfL Bad Nauheim | 10 | 6 | 3 | 1 | 51:30 | 15:5 |
| 3. | EV Füssen | 10 | 5 | 2 | 3 | 58:50 | 12:8 |
| 4. | Krefelder EV | 10 | 3 | 1 | 6 | 42:52 | 7:13 |
| 5. | HC Augsburg | 10 | 3 | 0 | 7 | 30:31 | 6:14 |
| 6. | Preußen Krefeld | 10 | 1 | 0 | 9 | 27:89 | 2:18 |
