= 1930 German Ice Hockey Championship =

The 1930 German Ice Hockey Championship was the 14th season of the German Ice Hockey Championship, the national championship of Germany. Berliner Schlittschuhclub won the championship by defeating SC Brandenburg Berlin in the final.

== First round ==
=== Group A ===
	Club	GP	W	T	L	GF–GA	Pts
1.	Berliner Schlittschuhclub	2	2	0	0	12:2	4:0
2.	ESV Füssen	2	1	0	1	5:9	2:2
3.	VfB Königsberg	2	0	0	2	2:8	0:4

=== Group B ===
	Club	GP	W	T	L	GF–GA	Pts
1.	SC Brandenburg Berlin	2	2	0	0	8:2	4:0
2.	SC Riessersee	2	1	0	1	7:3	2:2
3.	VfL Rastenburg	2	0	0	2	1:11	0:4

== 3rd place ==
ESV Füssen	–	SC Riessersee	3:0

== Final ==
Berliner Schlittschuhclub	–	SC Brandenburg Berlin	9:1
