= 1944 German Ice Hockey Championship =

The 1944 German Ice Hockey Championship was the 28th season of the German Ice Hockey Championship, the national championship of Germany. Kriegsspielgemeinschaft Berlin, a wartime combined team of Berliner Schlittschuhclub and SC Brandenburg Berlin won the championship by defeating LTTC Rot-Weiß Berlin in the final.

== First round ==
=== Group A ===
KSG Berlin	–	ESV Füssen	3:1
KSG Berlin	–	Klagenfurter AC	7:4
KSG Berlin	–	Wiener EG	5:1

=== Group B ===
	Club	GP	W	T	L	GF–GA	Pts
1.	LTTC Rot-Weiß Berlin	3	2	1	0	14:3	5:1
2.	Düsseldorfer EG	3	2	1	0	15:4	5:1
3.	EV Königsberg	3	1	0	2	4:17	2:4
4.	NSTG Prag	3	0	0	3	0:9	0:6

=== Group B Tiebreak ===
LTTC Rot-Weiß Berlin	–	Düsseldorfer EG	2:1

== 3rd place ==
Düsseldorfer EG	–	ESV Füssen	5:1

== Final ==
KSG Berlin	–	LTTC Rot-Weiß Berlin	4:3 (2:0, 1:1, 1:2)
