= 1928 German Ice Hockey Championship =

The 1928 German Ice Hockey Championship was the 12th season of the German Ice Hockey Championship, the national championship of Germany. Berliner Schlittschuhclub won the championship by defeating SC Riessersee in the final.

== First round ==
=== Group A ===
	Club	GP	W	T	L	GF–GA	Pts
1.	SC Riessersee	2	2	0	0	13:1	4:0
2.	Berliner FC Preußen	2	1	0	1	1:2	2:2
3.	HC Stuttgart	2	0	0	2	1:12	0:4

=== Group B ===
Berliner Schlittschuhclub	–	ESV Füssen	10:0

== 3rd place ==
ESV Füssen	–	BFC Preußen	4:1

== Final ==
Berliner Schlittschuhclub	–	SC Riessersee	2:1
