= 1933 German Ice Hockey Championship =

The 1933 German Ice Hockey Championship was the 17th season of the German Ice Hockey Championship, the national championship of Germany. Berliner Schlittschuhclub won the championship by defeating SC Riessersee in the final.

== First round ==
=== Group A ===
Berliner Schlittschuhclub	–	ESV Füssen	3:2

=== Group B ===
	Club	GP	W	T	L	GF–GA	Pts
1.	SC Riessersee	2	2	0	0	14:0	4:0
2.	VfL Rastenburg	1	0	0	1	0:2	0:2
3.	SEV Schwenningen	1	0	0	1	0:12	0:2

== 3rd place ==
EV Füssen	–	VfL Rastenburg	4:0

== Final ==
Berliner Schlittschuhclub	–	SC Riessersee	1:2 (2 OT)

The tiebreaking goal came with controversy. The goal judge initially recognized it was a goal, but the referee did not see it. After a lengthy discussion, the goal was allowed. Berliner protested the result, and the championship was re-played 11 months later.

=== Final re-play ===
Berliner Schlittschuhclub	–	SC Riessersee	1:0
