= 1931 German Ice Hockey Championship =

The 1931 German Ice Hockey Championship was the 15th season of the German Ice Hockey Championship, the national championship of Germany. Berliner Schlittschuhclub won the championship by defeating VfB Konigsberg in the final.

== First round ==
=== Group A ===
Berliner Schlittschuhclub	–	Münchener EV	3:1

=== Group B ===
	Club	GP	W	T	L	GF–GA	Pts
1.	VfB Königsberg	2	2	0	0	8:6	4:0
2.	SC Riessersee	2	1	0	1	13:4	2:2
3.	SEV Schwenningen	2	0	0	2	3:14	0:4

== Final ==
Berliner Schlittschuhclub	–	VfB Königsberg	9:2 (1:2, 4:0, 4:0)
