= 1932 German Ice Hockey Championship =

The 1932 German Ice Hockey Championship was the 16th season of the German Ice Hockey Championship, the national championship of Germany. Three teams participated in the championship, and Berliner Schlittschuhclub won the title.

== Final standings ==
| | Club | GP | W | T | L | GF–GA | Pts |
|---|---|---|---|---|---|---|---|
| 1. | Berliner Schlittschuhclub | 2 | 1 | 1 | 0 | 4:1 | 3:1 |
| 2. | SC Riessersee | 2 | 0 | 2 | 0 | 1:1 | 2:2 |
| 3. | Münchener EV | 2 | 0 | 1 | 1 | 2:5 | 1:3 |
