= 1975–76 ice hockey Bundesliga season =

German ice hockey season

The 1975–76 Ice hockey Bundesliga season was the 18th season of the Ice hockey Bundesliga, the top level of ice hockey in Germany. 10 teams participated in the league, and Berliner Schlittschuhclub won the championship.

== Regular season ==
	Club	Gp	W	T	L	GF–GA	Pts
1.	Berliner SC	36	26	3	7	180: 93	55:17
2.	EV Landshut	36	23	1	12	174:121	47:25
3.	Düsseldorfer EG	36	21	2	13	185:151	44:28
4.	Krefelder EV	36	19	2	15	185:147	40:32
5.	EV Füssen	36	18	0	18	137:160	36:36
6.	Kölner EC	36	15	4	17	143:144	34:38
7.	VfL Bad Nauheim	36	13	3	20	128:166	29:43
8.	EV Rosenheim	36	10	5	21	150:195	25:47
9.	SC Riessersee	36	11	3	22	151:197	25:47
10.	EC Bad Tölz	36	11	3	22	95:154	25:47
