= 1977–78 ice hockey Bundesliga season =

German ice hockey season

The 1977–78 Ice hockey Bundesliga season was the 20th season of the Ice hockey Bundesliga, the top level of ice hockey in Germany. 10 teams participated in the league, and SC Riessersee won the championship.

== First round ==
	Club	Gp	W	T	L	GF–GA	Pts
1.	Kölner EC (M)	36	25	2	9	230:121	52:20
2.	SC Riessersee	36	24	3	9	255:120	51:21
3.	Krefelder EV	36	25	1	10	223:135	51:21
4.	Berliner SC	36	24	2	10	182:133	50:22
5.	EV Landshut	36	19	5	12	170:121	43:29
6.	Düsseldorfer EG	36	14	4	18	164:162	32:40
7.	VfL Bad Nauheim	36	15	2	19	147:182	32:40
8.	EV Füssen	36	12	2	22	120:193	26:46
9.	EV Rosenheim	36	5	5	26	123:232	15:57
10.	EC Deilinghofen (N)	36	3	2	31	111:300	8:64

== Final round ==
	Club	Gp	W	T	L	GF–GA	Pts
1.	SC Riessersee	46	31	4	11	276:157	66:26
2.	Berliner SC	46	31	3	12	216:158	65:27
3.	Kölner EC (M)	46	28	5	13	277:161	61:31
4.	Krefelder EV	46	26	3	17	258:194	55:37
5.	EV Landshut	46	23	6	17	207:164	52:40
6.	Düsseldorfer EG	46	18	4	24	203:201	40:52

== Relegation round ==
	Club	Gp	W	T	L	GF–GA	Pts
1.	VfL Bad Nauheim	48	21	4	23	219:233	46:50
2.	EV Füssen	48	18	2	28	198:266	38:58
3.	EV Rosenheim	48	12	5	31	177:289	29:67
4.	EC Deilinghofen (N)	48	6	4	38	172:380	16:80
