= 1946 German Ice Hockey Championship =

The 1946 German Ice Hockey Championship consisted of two championships, the Bizone Championship and the German Championship. Both championships were unofficial, and there is no official German champion for 1946.

== Bizone Championship ==
	Club	GP	Pts
1.	Krefelder EV	6	9:3
2.	SC Riessersee	6	8:4
3.	ESV Füssen	6	4:8
4.	Düsseldorfer EG	6	3:9

== German Championship ==
	Club	GP	W	T	L	GF–GA	Pts
1.	SC Riessersee	2	2	0	0	19:3	4:0
2.	Krefelder EV	2	1	0	1	10:16	2:2
3.	ESV Füssen	2	0	0	2	8:18	0:4
