= 1925 German Ice Hockey Championship =

The 1925 German Ice Hockey Championship was the ninth season of the German Ice Hockey Championship, the national championship of Germany. Three teams participated in the championship, and Berliner Schlittschuhclub won the title.

== Final standings ==
	Club	GP	W	T	L	GF–GA	Pts
1.	Berliner Schlittschuhclub	2	2	0	0	13:2	4:0
2.	SC Riessersee	2	1	0	1	9:6	2:2
3.	Münchener EV	2	0	0	2	1:15	0:4
