= 1924 German Ice Hockey Championship =

The 1924 German Ice Hockey Championship was the eighth season of the German Ice Hockey Championship, the national championship of Germany. Berliner Schlittschuhclub won the championship by defeating SC Riessersee in the final.

== Final ==
Berliner Schlittschuhclub	–	SC Riessersee	6:2
