= 1973–74 ice hockey Bundesliga season =

German ice hockey season

The 1973–74 Ice hockey Bundesliga season was the 16th season of the Ice hockey Bundesliga, the top level of ice hockey in Germany. 10 teams participated in the league, and Berliner Schlittschuhclub won the championship.

== Regular season ==
	Club	Gp	W	T	L	GF–GA	Pts
1.	Berliner SC	36	24	3	9	150: 91	51:21
2.	EV Landshut	36	23	2	11	172:123	48:24
3.	VfL Bad Nauheim	36	23	0	13	159:118	46:26
4.	Düsseldorfer EG	36	20	4	12	181:127	44:28
5.	EV Füssen	36	19	2	15	143:127	40:32
6.	SC Riessersee	36	18	1	17	157:137	37:35
7.	EC Bad Tölz	36	17	2	17	125:128	36:36
8.	Kölner EC	36	10	1	25	118:188	21:51
9.	Krefelder EV	36	9	1	26	141:237	19:53
10.	Augsburger EV	36	8	2	26	120:190	18:54
