= 1980–81 ice hockey Bundesliga season =

German ice hockey season

The 1980–81 Ice hockey Bundesliga season was the 23rd season of the Ice hockey Bundesliga, the top level of ice hockey in Germany. 12 teams participated in the league, and SC Riessersee won the championship.

== First round ==
	Club	Gp	W	T	L	GF–GA	Pts
1.	SC Riessersee	44	30	8	6	212:123	68:20
2.	Düsseldorfer EG	44	29	3	12	258:167	61:27
3.	Mannheimer ERC (M)	44	25	5	14	258:163	55:33
4.	Berliner SC	44	23	6	15	202:170	52:36
5.	EV Landshut	44	22	7	15	211:141	51:37
6.	SB Rosenheim	44	22	6	16	187:145	50:38
7.	ESV Kaufbeuren (N)	44	18	6	20	190:234	42:46
8.	EV Füssen	44	18	4	22	196:210	40:48
9.	VfL Bad Nauheim	44	16	7	21	171:201	39:49
10.	Kölner EC	44	17	2	25	151:181	36:52
11.	EHC 70 München (N)	44	12	6	26	157:205	30:58
12.	Duisburger SC	44	1	0	43	65:328	2:86

== Relegation ==
	Club	Gp	W	T	L	GF–GA	Pts
9.	Kölner EC	50	22	2	26	198:198	46:54
10.	VfL Bad Nauheim	50	17	8	25	195:233	42:58
11.	EHC 70 München (N)	50	15	6	29	180:235	36:64
12.	Duisburger SC	50	3	1	46	84:362	7:93

== Playoffs ==
=== Quarterfinals (annulled) ===
			Series	1	2	3
SC Riessersee	–	ESV Kaufbeuren	2:0	8:3	4:3	–
Düsseldorfer EG	–	ESB Rosenheim	2:1	2:1	2:3	5:2
Mannheimer ERC	–	Berliner SC	2:0	6:3	8:3	–
Kölner EC	–	EV Landshut	2:0	6:2	5:3	–

=== Quarterfinals ===
			Series	1	2	3
SC Riessersee	–	EV Füssen	2:0	6:4	3:1	–
Düsseldorfer EG	–	ESV Kaufbeuren	2:0	14:4	7:5	–
Mannheimer ERC	–	SB Rosenheim	2:1	3:2 OT	2:4	3:2
Berliner SC	–	EV Landshut	2:1	4:3	2:7	4:0

=== Semifinals ===
			Series	1	2	3
SC Riessersee	–	Berliner SC	2:1	5:3	3:4	4:2
Düsseldorfer EG	–	Mannheimer ERC	2:1	5:0	2:6	5:4 OT

=== 3rd place ===
			Series	1	2	3
Mannheimer ERC	–	Berliner SC	2:0	3:2 OT	4:1	–

=== Final ===
			Series	1	2	3
SC Riessersee	–	Düsseldorfer EG	2:1	4:2	1:4	7:4
