= 1926 German Ice Hockey Championship =

The 1926 German Ice Hockey Championship was the tenth season of the German Ice Hockey Championship, the national championship of Germany. Berliner Schlittschuhclub won the championship by defeating SC Charlottenburg in the final.

== First round ==
Königsberg	–	Münchener EV	2:0
Leipziger Sportclub	–	SC Charlottenburg	0:5

== Semifinals ==
Berliner Schlittschuhclub	–	Königsberg	13:1
SC Riessersee	–	SC Charlottenburg	1:4

== Final ==
Berliner Schlittschuhclub	–	SC Charlottenburg	7:0
