= 1921 German Ice Hockey Championship =

The 1921 German Ice Hockey Championship was the fifth season of the German Ice Hockey Championship, the national championship of Germany. Berliner Schlittschuhclub won the championship by defeating MTV Munchen 1879 in the final.

== Final ==
Berliner Schlittschuhclub	–	MTV München 1879	6:0
