= 1982–83 ice hockey Bundesliga season =

German ice hockey season

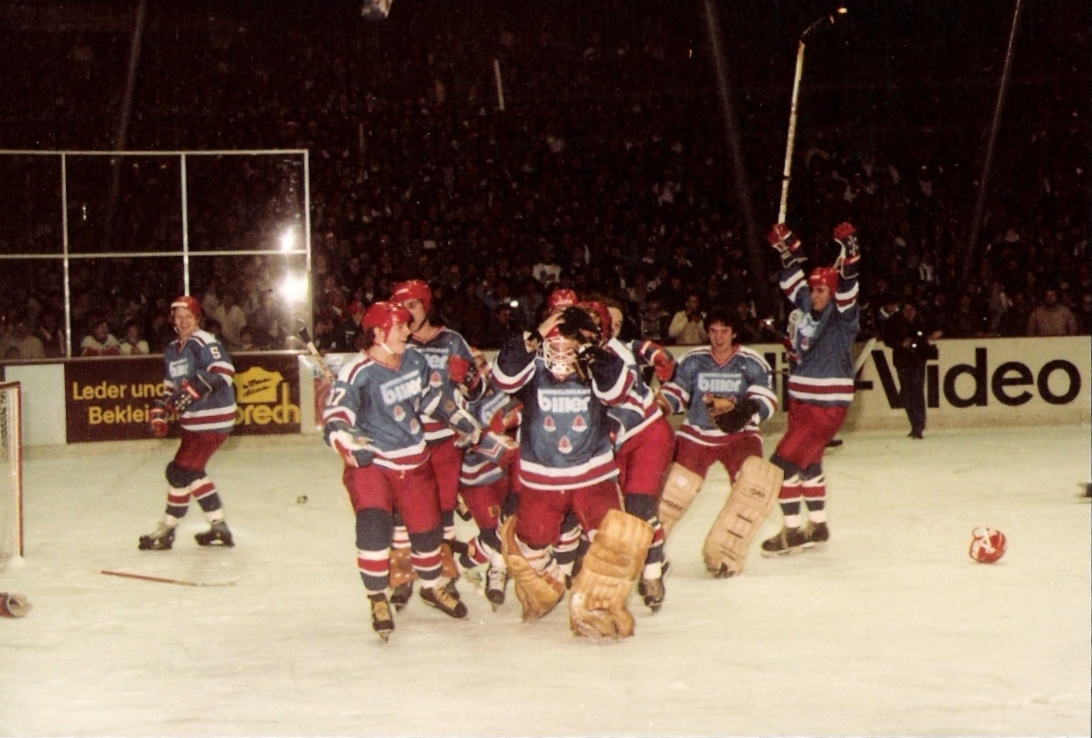
Jubilation by the players of EV Landshut, a professional German hockey club, after winning the final play-off game against the Mannheimer ERC, therefore being German champion of hockey in 1982-83

The 1982–83 Ice hockey Bundesliga season was the 25th season of the Ice hockey Bundesliga, the top level of ice hockey in Germany. 10 teams participated in the league, and EV Landshut won the championship.

== First round ==
	Club	GP	W	T	L	GF–GA	Pts
1.	EV Landshut	36	28	0	8	196:121	56:16
2.	Mannheimer ERC	36	26	3	7	185:101	55:17
3.	SB Rosenheim (M)	36	23	3	10	161:103	49:23
4.	Kölner EC	36	21	4	11	200:138	46:26
5.	Schwenninger ERC	36	16	5	15	148:133	37:35
6.	ESV Kaufbeuren	36	17	2	17	148:155	36:36
7.	SC Riessersee	36	11	6	19	132:155	28:44
8.	Düsseldorfer EG	36	9	3	24	102:185	21:51
9.	ECD Iserlohn (N)	36	8	4	24	112:178	20:52
10.	EV Füssen	36	5	2	29	97:212	12:60

== Relegation round ==
	Club	GP	W	T	L	GF–GA	Pts
1.	ECD Iserlohn	6	6	0	0	33:15	12:0
2.	Duisburger SC	6	3	0	3	30:23	6:6
3.	EV Füssen	6	1	1	4	20:28	3:9
4.	EC Bad Tölz	6	1	1	4	19:36	3:9

== Playoffs ==
=== Quarterfinals ===
			Series	1	2	3
EV Landshut	–	Düsseldorfer EG	2:0	10:6	4:3	–
Mannheimer ERC	–	SC Riessersee	2:1	4:3	1:6	7:3
SB Rosenheim	–	ESV Kaufbeuren	2:1	7:5	4:5	6:1
Kölner EC	–	Schwenninger ERC	2:1	7:2	1:3	5:1

=== Placing round ===
==== First round ====
			Series	1	2	3
Schwenninger ERC	–	Düsseldorfer EG	2:1	4:1	4:6	11:3
ESV Kaufbeuren	–	SC Riessersee	2:0	9:6	3:1	–

==== 7th place ====
			Series	1	2	3
SC Riessersee	–	Düsseldorfer EG	2:0	4:2	6:1	–

==== 5th place ====
			Series	1	2	3
Schwenninger ERC	–	ESV Kaufbeuren	0:2	4:6	3:6	–

=== Semifinals ===
			Series	1	2	3	4	5
EV Landshut	–	Kölner EC	3:1	5:2	3:13	6:2	6:3	–
Mannheimer ERC	–	SB Rosenheim	3:1	5:3	1:6	2:1	5:4	–

=== 3rd place ===
			Series	1	2	3
SB Rosenheim	–	Kölner EC	2:0	6:5	7:5	–

=== Final ===
			Series	1	2	3	4	5
EV Landshut	–	Mannheimer ERC	3:1	2:1	2:8	6:4	5:4	–
