= Alfred Steinke =

German ice hockey player (1881–1945)

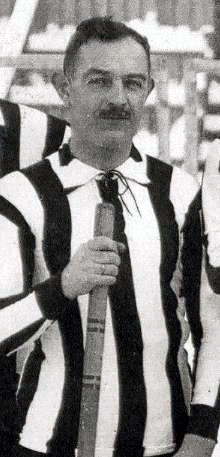
- Alfred Steinke
- Born: June 6, 1881 Berlin, German Empire
- Died: May 3, 1945 (aged 63) Berlin, Nazi Germany
- Position: Defence
- Played for: Berliner Schlittschuh-Club
- National team: Germany
- Playing career: 1900–1927

Alfred Wilhelm Steinke (June 6, 1881 – May 3, 1945) was a German ice hockey player. Steinke played on the Germany men's national ice hockey team at the 1928 Winter Olympics. He became one of the oldest male hockey players to compete in the Olympics at the age of 48.
