= 1920 German Ice Hockey Championship =

Fourth season of the German Ice Hockey Championship

The 1920 German Ice Hockey Championship was the fourth season of the German Ice Hockey Championship, the national championship of Germany. Three teams participated in the championship, and Berliner Schlittschuhclub won the title.

== Final standings ==
	Club	GP	W	T	L	GF–GA	Pts
1.	Berliner Schlittschuhclub	2	2	0	0	24:8	4:0
2.	MTV München 1879	2	1	0	1	11:9	2:2
3.	SC Charlottenburg	2	0	0	2	6:24	0:4
