= 1913 German Ice Hockey Championship =

Ice hockey competition season

The 1913 German Ice Hockey Championship was the second season of the German Ice Hockey Championship, the national championship of Germany. Berliner Schlittschuhclub won the championship by defeating MTV Munchen 1879 in the final.

== First round ==
=== South ===
==== 1st round ====
MTV München 1879	–	Münchener EV	29:0
Münchner SC	–	SC Monachia München	18:0

==== 2nd round ====
MTV München 1879	–	Münchner SC	3:9

==== 3rd round ====
MTV München 1879	–	DEHG Prag	5:2

=== North ===
Berliner Schlittschuhclub	–	SC Charlottenburg	5:3

== Final ==
Berliner Schlittschuhclub	–	MTV München 1879	4:0
