= Oberliga (ice hockey) =

Third-tier men's ice hockey league in Germany

- Sport: Ice hockey
- Founded: 1948; 78 years ago
- Administrator: DEB
- No. of teams: 28
- Country: Germany
- Most recent champion: ECDC Memmingen
- Most titles: EV Füssen (7 titles)
- Broadcaster: Sprade TV
- Level on pyramid: Level 3
- Promotion to: DEL2
- Relegation to: Regionalliga
- Related competitions: Deutsche Eishockey Liga
- Website: Oberliga South; Oberliga North

The Oberliga (English: Upper League) is the third tier of ice hockey in Germany, below DEL2 and above the Regionalliga. Since the 2015/16 season, the league has been split into two regionalised divisions, Nord (north) and Süd (south). The Oberliga was originally founded in 1948 and is administered by the German Ice Hockey Federation (DEB).

== History ==
The Oberliga is the oldest continuously operating ice hockey league in Germany. The league was formed in 1948 after WWII as the highest level of hockey in Germany. The Oberliga has been the top, second and third level of ice hockey in the German league pyramid throughout its history. The 1948/49 Oberliga champions, EV Füssen, were the very first Deutscher Meister (English: German champion). In 2015/16, Oberliga was the first German league to admit a Dutch team, Tilburg Trappers, to compete in the German league system.

=== 1948–58 ===
The Oberliga started its first season in 1948/49 with six teams. Those teams played a home-and-away season to determine the German champion. The founding members of the league were:

- EV Füssen
- Preußen Krefeld
- SC Riessersee
- VfL Bad Nauheim
- HC Augsburg
- Kölner EK

EV Füssen won the inaugural Oberliga championship and were named Oberliga and German champions. The league expanded to eight clubs for the second season and twelve in the third. From 1952 to 1956 the league trimmed the number of teams back to eight before working to restore the number to 12 by the 1957/58 season. The 1957/58 season was the last one for the league as the highest level of play in Germany. The German Ice Hockey Federation decided to form the Eishockey-Bundesliga to replace the Oberliga as the new top division. The top eight clubs from the Oberliga, qualified for the new top division with the bottom four remaining in the Oberliga.

=== 1958–73 ===
The Oberliga had now become the second tier of German ice hockey (second division). The league started with eight clubs, including the four remaining clubs from the previous season. The league expanded to twelve in the coming seasons. The year 1966 saw the league split into northern and southern regionalised groups. The two separate leagues were called Oberliga South and Oberliga North. The winners of the two leagues would determine the Oberliga champion in a home-and-away series.

The league reunited in a single division in 1970, now with a strength of 16 teams and direct promotion to the Bundesliga.

The 1972/73 season was the last one as a tier-two league. With the foundation of the 2nd Bundesliga, the Oberliga fell to tier three. While the league champion moved up to the Bundesliga and the teams placed two to nine gained entry to the new second division, only the bottom seven clubs remained in the league.

1973 saw DEB introduce a new second division to the German ice hockey pyramid, with the formation of the 2nd Bundesliga. The Oberliga was demoted to become the new German third division (third highest level of ice hockey in Germany). 1972–73 was the last season Oberliga operated as the division two league. The Oberliga champion that season was granted automatic promotion to the Bundesliga. Clubs that finished second to ninth qualified for automatic entry to the new 2nd Bundesliga, while the bottom seven clubs remained in Oberliga.

=== 1973–94 ===
The Oberliga was now again divided into a northern and a southern group. The top two teams out of the two divisions originally played out a promotion round to the 2nd Bundesliga which also served to determine the Oberliga champion. While the modus and number of teams in the league continued to fluctuate, the overall situation remained the same.

=== 1994–99 ===
The year 1994 saw major changes in the German league system. The Bundesliga and 2nd Bundesliga merged to form the new DEL, an independently run league consisting of 18 clubs in its foundation years. Those second division clubs that did not elect to join the DEL were integrated into the new 1st Liga, which had replaced the Oberliga and operated in a northern and a southern group. The best teams of each of the two divisions played out a DEB championship, similar to the old Oberliga championship.

The 1998–99 season was very much a transition season. The DEB had reintroduced a single-division, nationwide league, titled Bundesliga to compete with the DEL. The league below was now the 1st Liga, which was made up of those clubs from the 1st Liga not adCentred to the new Bundesliga and 2nd Liga clubs. However, this situation existed for only one season.

=== 1999–present ===
From 1999, the league returned to its traditional name Oberliga, with two regional groups, north and south. In turn, the league above it took the name 2nd Bundesliga. The DEL renamed itself DEL – Bundesliga.

Due to a lack of interest, the Oberliga North dissolved after the 2000–01 season. The three clubs from this region that were still interested in playing at the Oberliga level joined the southern division.

The Oberliga South, largely made up of Bavarian clubs, continued to operate successfully in the coming season, usually including a couple of northern clubs, while the Oberliga North was not reestablished until 2007.

The ESBG, now operating the 2nd Bundesliga and Oberliga for the DEB, decided to reform an Oberliga North in 2007. The two separate divisions of the league were however not completely independent of each other, like in the past. Teams from the same league would meet each other four times now, while clubs from different divisions would only meet twice in the regular season. At the end of this, a combined play-off round would determine the Oberliga champion.

In 2007–08, the Oberliga was split into northern and southern groups for the first time since 2001. The northern group contains nine, and the southern ten clubs. The four top teams from each group enter a best-of-five play-off round to determine the Oberliga champion and the two teams promoted to the 2nd Bundesliga. The bottom four in each group enter a play-down round to determine the relegated teams.

In the 2008–09 season, the league played in a single-division format, before switching to four regional divisions with an Oberliga championship at the end from 2010 onwards.

In the summer of 2010, the organisation of the Oberliga broke away from the ESBG and the format was changed:

- the Oberliga South was organised by the DEB beginning in 2010/11;
- the new Oberliga West was organised by the LEV Northrhein-Westfalen;
- the new Oberliga North was till 2012/13 organised by the LEV Niedersachsen – now also organised by the DEB;
- the new Oberliga East was organised by the LEV Berlin
- The top teams from the West, North, and East groups play a final round in their groups after the regular season
  - The top teams from the final round qualify for the promotion playoffs
- The teams from the South group play after the normal round playoffs for the teams, which qualify them for the promotion playoffs

== Current teams ==
2022/23 German teams in Oberliga
2022/23 Dutch teams in Oberliga

Oberliga North Teams: 2022–23 Season
Team	Location		Arena	Capacity	Founded	Joined league
Team	City	State	Arena	Capacity	Founded	Joined league
Füchse Duisburg	Duisburg	North Rhine-Westphalia	PreZero Rheinlandhalle	4,800	1971	2010
Black Dragons Erfurt	Erfurt	Thuringia	Eissportzentrum Erfurt	1,200	2010	2010
Moskitos Essen	Essen	North Rhine-Westphalia	Eissporthalle Essen-West	3,850	1994	2015
Saale Bulls Halle	Halle (Saale)	Saxony-Anhalt	Eissporthalle Halle	2,200	2004	2010
Hamburg Crocodiles	Hamburg	Hamburg	Eisland Farmsen	2,300	1990	2010
Hannover Indians	Hannover	Lower Saxony	Eisstadion am Pferdeturm	4,608	1948	2013
Hannover Scorpions	Hannover	Lower Saxony	Eishalle Langenhagen	3,800	1996	2013
Herner EV 2007	Herne	North Rhine-Westphalia	Gysenberghalle	3,700	2007	2012
Krefelder EV 81	Krefeld	North Rhine-Westphalia	Rheinlandhalle	6,714	1955	2021
IceFighters Leipzig	Leipzig	Saxony	Kohlrabizirkus Eisarena	2,500	2010	2010
Rostock Piranhas	Rostock	Mecklenburg-Vorpommern	Eishalle Rostock	2,000	1990	2010
Tilburg Trappers	Tilburg	North Brabant	IJssportcentrum Tilburg	2,500	1938	2015

Oberliga South Teams: 2019–20 Season
Team	Location		Arena	Capacity	Founded	Joined league
Team	City	State	Arena	Capacity	Founded	Joined league
EV Füssen	Füssen	Bavaria	Bundesleistungszentrum	4,700	1922	2019
Höchstadter EC	Höchstadt	Bavaria	Eisstadion Höchstadt	2,000	1993	2018
ECDC Memmingen	Memmingen	Bavaria	Eissportstadion am Hühnerberg	3,850	1992	2017
EV Lindau Islanders	Lindau	Bavaria	Eichwaldstadion	1,100	1976	2016
EC Peiting	Peiting	Bavaria	Eisstadion Peiting	2,500	1973	2000
SC Riessersee	Garmisch-Partenkirchen	Bavaria	Olympia-Eissport-Zentrum	6,926	1920	2018
ERC Sonthofen 1999	Sonthofen	Bavaria	Eissporthalle Sonthofen	2,860	1999	2014
Eisbären Regensburg	Regensburg	Bavaria	Donau Arena	4,961	1962	2010
Starbulls Rosenheim	Rosenheim	Bavaria	Rofa-Stadion	4,750	2000	2017
Selber Wölfe	Selb	Bavaria	Hutschenreuther Eissporthalle	4,082	2004	2010
Blue Devils Weiden	Weiden	Bavaria	Eisstadion Weiden	2,560	1985	2012
Deggendorfer SC	Deggendorf	Bavaria	Eissporthalle an der Trat	4,000	2002	2019

== Champions and premiers ==
Oberliga Champions and League Premiers
Year	Lvl	Champion(s)	League Premier(s)			
Year	Lvl	Champion(s)	North	South	East	West
1949	1	EV Füssen	–			
1950	1	SC Riessersee	–			
1951	1	Preußen Krefeld	–			
1952	1	Krefelder EV	–			
1953	1	EV Füssen	–			
1954	1	EV Füssen	–			
1955	1	EV Füssen	–			
1956	1	EV Füssen	–			
1957	1	EV Füssen	–			
1958	1	EV Füssen	–			
1959	2	VfL Bad Nauheim	–			
1960	2	TuS Eintracht Dortmund	–			
1961	2	ESV Kaufbeuren	–			
1962	2	EV Landshut	–			
1963	2	EV Landshut	–			
1964	2	TuS Eintracht Dortmund	–			
1965	2	Preußen Krefeld	–			
1966	2	Berliner Schlittschuhclub	Berliner Schlittschuhclub			
1967	2	Augsburger EV	VfL Bad Nauheim	Augsburger EV	–	
1968	2	SC Riessersee	Eintracht Frankfurt	SC Riessersee	–	
1969	2	ESV Kaufbeuren	Kölner EC	ESV Kaufbeuren	–	
1970	2	EV Rosenheim	EC Deilinghofen	EV Rosenheim	–	
1971	2	Preußen Krefeld	–			
1972	2	Berliner Schlittschuhclub	–			
1973	2	Kölner EC	–			
1974	3	EC Peiting	EC Hannover	EC Peiting	–	
1975	3	TSV Straubing	Herner EV	EHC 70 München	–	
1976	3	EV Landsberg	Herner EV	EHC 70 München	–	
1977	3	ERC Freiburg	EHC Essen	ERC Freiburg	–	
1978	3	RSC Bremerhaven	RSC Bremerhaven	EV Regensburg	–	
1979	3	Deggendorfer SC	Herner EV	Deggendorfer SC	–	
1980	3	Hamburger SV	Hamburger SV	VER Selb	–	
1981	3	Eintracht Frankfurt (North); Augsburger EV (South)	Hamburger SV	Augsburger EV	–	
1982	3	Eintracht Frankfurt	Eintracht Frankfurt	EC Peiting	–	
1983	3	SV Bayreuth	ESG Kassel	SV Bayreuth	–	
1984	3	EC Bad Nauheim	EC Bad Nauheim	VER Selb	–	
1985	3	SC Solingen	SC Solingen	EHC 80 Nürnberg	–	
1986	3	EHC 80 Nürnberg	Neusser SC	EHC 80 Nürnberg	EV Stuttgart	
1987	3	EC Ratingen (North); EV Stuttgart (centre); ERC Ingolstadt (South)	–			
1988	3	ERC Sonthofen	ERC Westfalen Dortmund	ERC Sonthofen	–	
1989	3	Augsburger EV	ECD Sauerland Iserlohn	Augsburger EV	–	
1990	3	EV Ravensburg	Grefrather EC	EV Ravensburg	–	
1991	3	SC Memmingen	EC Bad Nauheim	SC Memmingen	–	
1992	3	ETC Timmendorfer Strand	ETC Timmendorfer Strand	TuS Geretsried	–	
1993	3	Frankfurter ESC	Frankfurter ESC	EV Landsberg	–	
1994	3	EC Bad Tölz	ESC Wedemark	Heilbronner EC	–	
1995	2/3	EHC Freiburg (1.liga); Grefrather EV (2.liga)	ERC Westfalen Dortmund (1.liga); Grefrather EV (2.liga)	SC Riessersee (1.liga); EV Dingolfing (2.liga)	–	
1996	2/3	ESC Wedemark (1.liga); Limburger EG (2.liga)	ESC Wedemark (1.liga); Limburger EG (2.liga)	Heilbronner EC (1.liga); ERC Ingolstadt (2.liga)	–	
1997	2/3	EHC Neuwied (1.liga); SC Bietigheim-Bissingen (2.liga)	EHC Neuwied (1.liga); Braunlager EHC/Harz (2.liga)	EC Bad Tölz (1.liga); SC Bietigheim-Bissingen (2.liga)	–	
1998	2/3	EHC Neuwied (1.liga); EHC Braunlage/Harz (2.liga)	EHC Neuwied (1.liga)	Heilbronner EC (1.liga); EV Regensburg (2.liga)	–	
1999	3/4	REV Bremerhaven (1.liga); EHC Bad Aibling (2.liga)	REV Bremerhaven (1.liga)	SC Bietigheim-Bissingen (1.liga); EHC Bad Aibling (2.liga)	–	
2000	3	EV Duisburg (North); EHC Straubing (South)	EV Duisburg	EHC Straubing	–	
2001	3	EHC Wolfsburg (North); EV Regensburg (South)	EHC Wolfsburg	EV Regensburg	–	
2002	3	EV Landshut	EV Landshut			
2003	3	Blue Devils Weiden	ERV Schweinfurt			
2004	3	REV Bremerhaven	EHC Moskitos Essen			
2005	3	Dresdner Eislöwen	Dresdner Eislöwen	Heilbronner Falken	–	
2006	3	EV Landsberg 2000	EV Landsberg 2000			
2007	3	Heilbronner Falken	SC Riessersee			
2008	3	Dresdner Eislöwen	Dresdner Eislöwen	Tölzer Löwen	–	
2009	3	Hannover Indians (North); ESV Kaufbeuren (South)	Hannover Indians	EC Peiting	–	
2010	3	Starbulls Rosenheim	Herner EV			
2011	3	SC Riessersee	Rostock Piranhas	Tölzer Löwen	Saale Bulls Halle	EHC Dortmund
2012	3	Tölzer Löwen	Rostock Piranhas	EC Peiting	Saale Bulls Halle	EHC Dortmund
2013	3	RT Bad Nauheim	EHC Timmendorfer Strand 06	EC Peiting	Saale Bulls Halle	Kassel Huskies
2014	3	–	Hannover Scorpions	VER Selb	Icefighters Leipzig	Löwen Frankfurt
2015	3	EHC Freiburg	Hannover Scorpions	EHC Freiburg	Icefighters Leipzig	Füchse Duisburg
2016	3	Tilburg Trappers	Füchse Duisburg	EV Regensburg	–	
2017	3	Tilburg Trappers	Herner EV 2007	Tölzer Löwen	–	
2018	3	Tilburg Trappers	Tilburg Trappers	Deggendorfer SC	–	
2019	3	EV Landshut	Tilburg Trappers	EC Peiting	–	
2020	3	–	Tilburg Trappers	Eisbären Regensburg	–	

== See also ==
- Deutsche Eishockey Liga, the DEL
- 2nd Bundesliga
- Bavarian ice hockey leagues
