= 1922 German Ice Hockey Championship =

The 1922 German Ice Hockey Championship was the sixth season of the German Ice Hockey Championship, the national championship of Germany. Three teams participated in the championship, and MTV Munchen 1879 won the title.

== Final standings ==
	Club	GP	W	T	L	GF–GA	Pts
1.	MTV München 1879	2	2	0	0	4:2	4:0
2.	Berliner Schlittschuhclub	2	1	0	1	8:3	2:2
3.	SC Charlottenburg	2	0	0	2	4:11	0:4
