= 1914 German Ice Hockey Championship =

The 1914 German Ice Hockey Championship was the third season of the German Ice Hockey Championship, the national championship of Germany. Berliner Schlittschuhclub won the championship by defeating MTV Munchen 1879 in the final.

== Semifinals ==
Berliner Schlittschuhclub	–	DEHG Prag	12:0
MTV München 1879	–	SC Charlottenburg	3:2

== Final ==
Berliner Schlittschuhclub	–	MTV München 1879	12:1
