= 1974–75 ice hockey Bundesliga season =

German ice hockey season

The 1974–75 Ice hockey Bundesliga season was the 17th season of the Ice hockey Bundesliga, the top level of ice hockey in Germany. 10 teams participated in the league, and Düsseldorfer EG won the championship.

== Regular season ==
	Club	GP	W	T	L	GF–GA	Pts
1.	Düsseldorfer EG	36	27	2	7	198:122	56:16
2.	Berliner SC	36	24	1	11	169: 98	49:23
3.	Krefelder EV	36	22	3	11	192:149	47:25
4.	EV Landshut	36	22	2	12	165:131	46:26
5.	EV Füssen	36	18	1	17	167:152	37:35
6.	VfL Bad Nauheim	36	17	0	19	167:154	34:38
7.	Kölner EC	36	17	0	19	168:186	34:38
8.	SC Riessersee	36	11	2	23	125:165	24:48
9.	EC Bad Tölz	36	11	1	24	94:178	23:49
10.	ESV Kaufbeuren	36	5	0	31	82:192	10:62
