= Eissporthalle an der Jafféstraße =

Former ice hockey stadium in Berlin, Germany

Coordinates: 52.5015°N 13.2679°E

Eissporthalle an der Jafféstraße was a 6,000-capacity indoor arena located in Charlottenburg-Wilmersdorf, Berlin, Germany. It opened in 1973 and was home to Berliner Schlittschuhclub until 1983 and then BSC Preussen. The arena also hosted concerts, most notably the last performance by Led Zeppelin on 7 July 1980 before their reunion concert on 10 December 2007. The building was demolished in 2001. BSC Preussen moved to the nearby Deutschlandhalle which replaced it as the new main venue for ice hockey in western Berlin.
