= 1947 German Ice Hockey Championship =

The 1947 German Ice Hockey Championship was the 29th season of the German Ice Hockey Championship, the national championship of Germany. There were Northern and Southern qualification groups. The top teams from each group qualified for the final. SC Riessersee won the championship by defeating SG Berlin-Eichkamp in the final.

== Final ==
SC Riessersee	–	SG Berlin-Eichkamp	10:1 (4:0, 3:0, 3:1)
