= 1912 German Ice Hockey Championship =

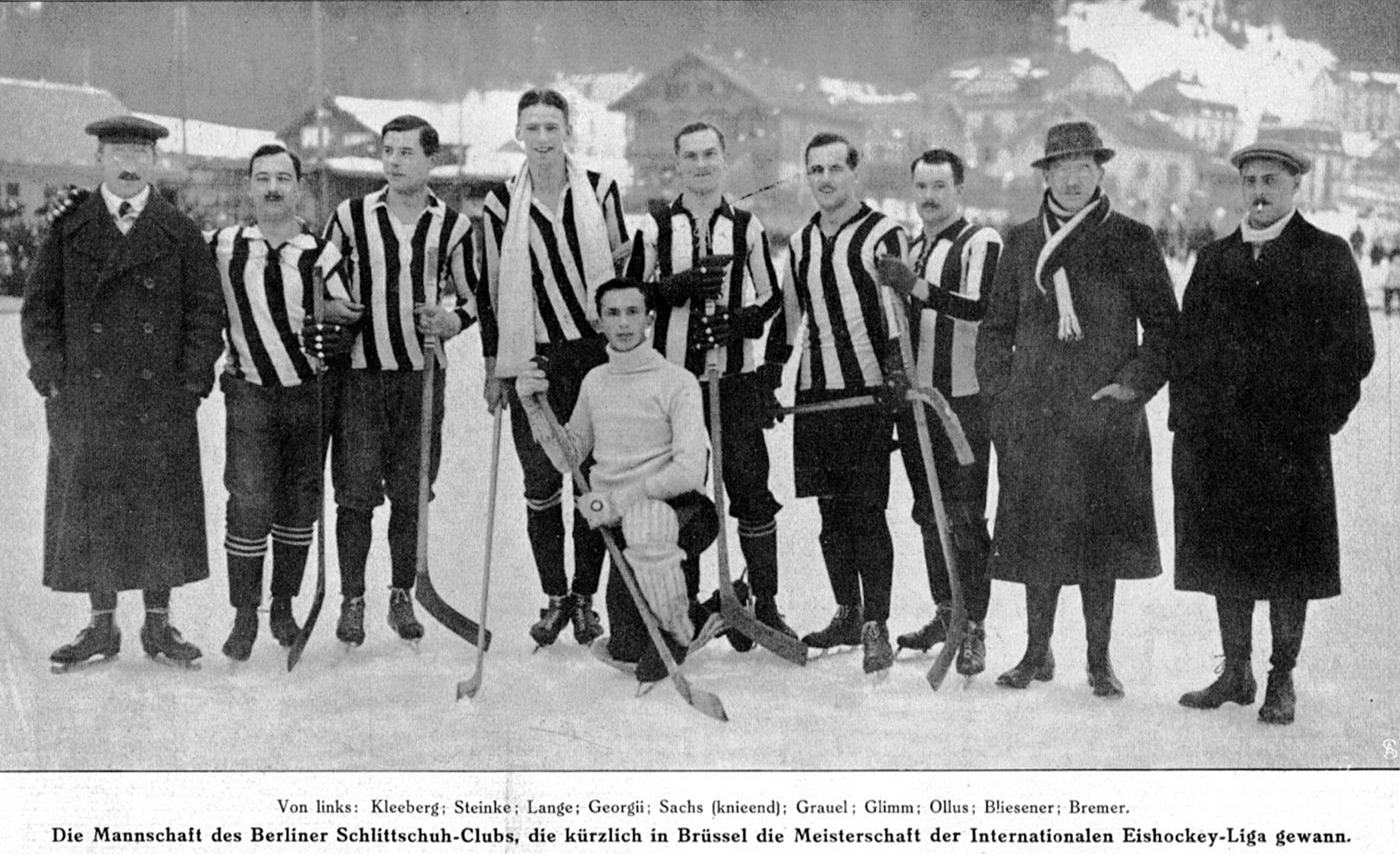

The 1912 German Ice Hockey Championship was the first season of the German Ice Hockey Championship, the national championship of Germany. Berliner Schlittschuhclub won the championship by defeating SC Charlottenburg in the final.

== Final ==
Berliner Schlittschuhclub	–	SC Charlottenburg	2:1 (3 OT)
