= Eisstadion am Pferdeturm =

Ice arena in Hannover, Germany

Coordinates: 52.372222°N 9.780556°E

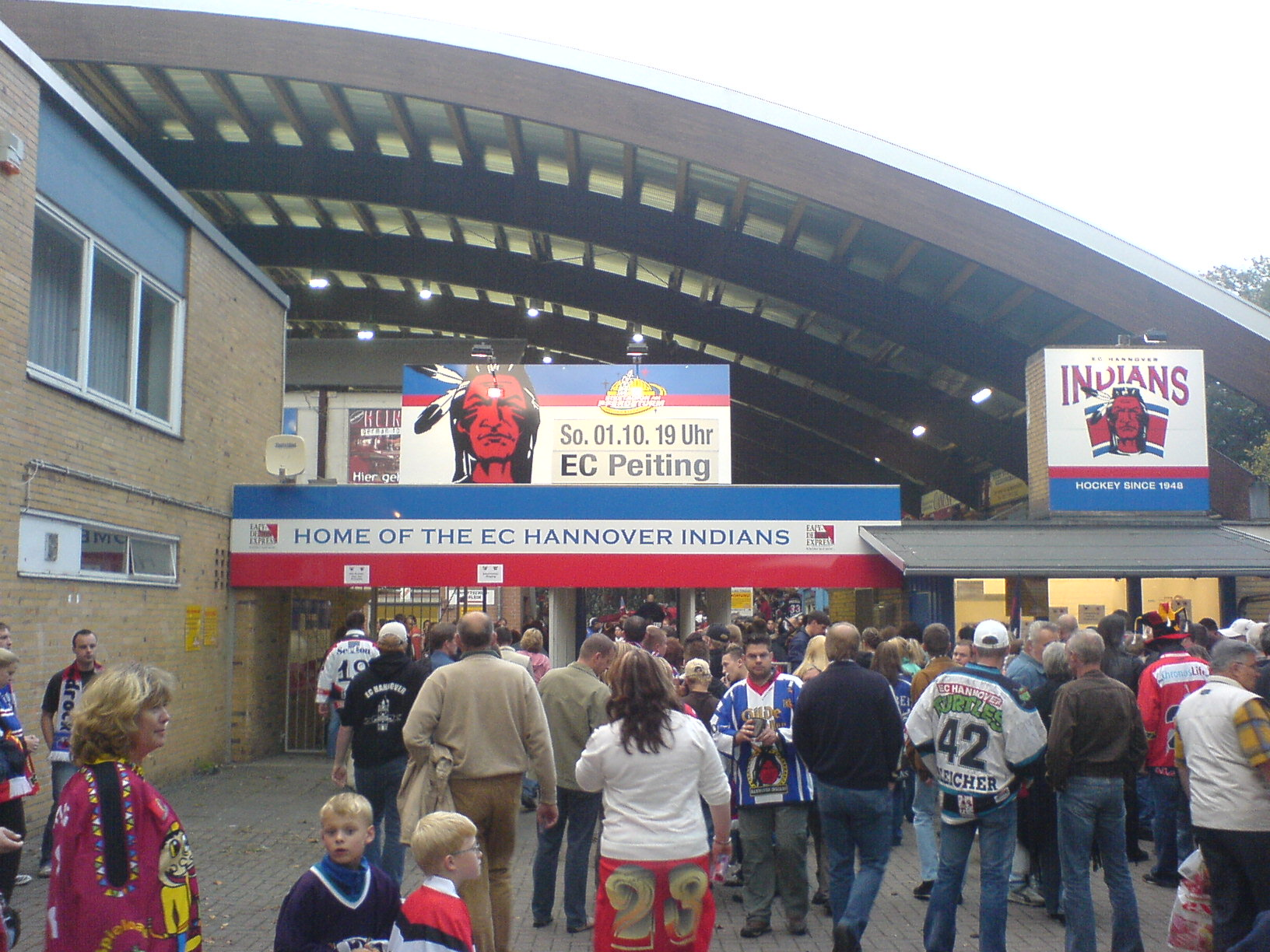
- Interactive map of Eisstadion am Pferdeturm
- Full name: Eisstadion am Pferdeturm
- Location: Hannover, Germany
- Capacity: 4,608

Construction
- Opened: 1959

Tenant
- Hannover Indians

The Eisstadion am Pferdeturm is an ice arena in Hannover, Germany. It is primarily used for ice hockey and is the home of the Hannover Indians. It opened in 1959 and holds 4,608 spectators.
