= Jari Pasanen =

Finnish-German ice hockey coach

Jari Pasanen (born August 19, 1964, in Imatra, Finland) is a Finnish-German professional ice hockey coach, who has been serving as head coach of the Starbulls Rosenheim of the DEL2 since the season 2022/2023.

== Playing career ==
Pasanen played for his hometown team Imatran Ketterä until 1993 and then spent a single season in the United States, splitting the 1993–94 campaign between CoHL’s Muskegon Fury and SuHL sides West Palm Beach Blaze and Daytona Beach Sun Devils.

He then moved to Germany, where he played three years at EC Wedemark, including one year (96-97) in the top-flight Deutsche Eishockey Liga (DEL) and a total of five years at minor league teams EC Wilhelmshaven-Stickhausen, ESC Erfurt and ERV Schweinfurt. He retired in 2002.

== Coaching career ==
Pasanen was named head coach of ERV Schweinfurt in 2002 and remained in the job until 2004. He accepted the position as assistant coach of DEL side Hannover Scorpions for the 2004-2005 campaign. He then served as head coach of German second-division team Moskitos Essen from 2005 to 2008 and from 2010 to 2011, interrupted by a stint with the Schwenninger Wild Wings in 2008–2009 season.

In 2012, Pasanen joined the coaching staff of DEL team Iserlohn Roosters as an assistant. He was named caretaker coach in October 2013, after the Roosters had sacked Doug Mason, and then stayed on as head coach.

Pasanen guided the Iserlohn squad to DEL playoff appearances in 2014, 2015 and 2016. In 2015–2016 season, he led the Roosters to a third-place finish in the DEL regular season standings. He was sacked on October 10, 2017 after winning only three of the first ten games of 2017-2018 season.
