= Saale Bulls Halle =

- City: Halle, Germany
- League: Oberliga
- Founded: 2004
- Home arena: Eissporthalle Halle
- Colours: Red, Black, White

The Saale Bulls Halle are an ice hockey team in Halle, Germany. They play in the Oberliga, the third level of ice hockey in Germany. The club was founded in 2004.
