= EHC Dortmund =

- City: Dortmund, Germany
- League: Oberliga
- Founded: 1996
- Home arena: Westfalenhallen
- Colours: Blue, White, Red
- Website: http://www.ehcdortmund.de/

EHC Dortmund Die Elche (Elks) is an ice hockey team in Dortmund, Germany. The club was founded in 1996 after the financial collapse of ERC Dortmund.

== Other Clubs at Dortmund ==
- EV Westfalen Dortmund: 1936 - 1940
- TuS Eintracht Dortmund - Department Eishockey: 1956 - 1965
- ERC Westfalen Dortmund: 1964 - 1990
- ERC Westfalen Dortmund 1990: 1990 - 1996
- Eisadler Dortmund: 2013 -

== Achievements ==
- Regionalliga champion: 2008, 2009.
