= Donau Arena =

Arena in Regensburg, Germany

Coordinates: 49°1′31.12″N 12°7′58.24″E

Donau-Arena

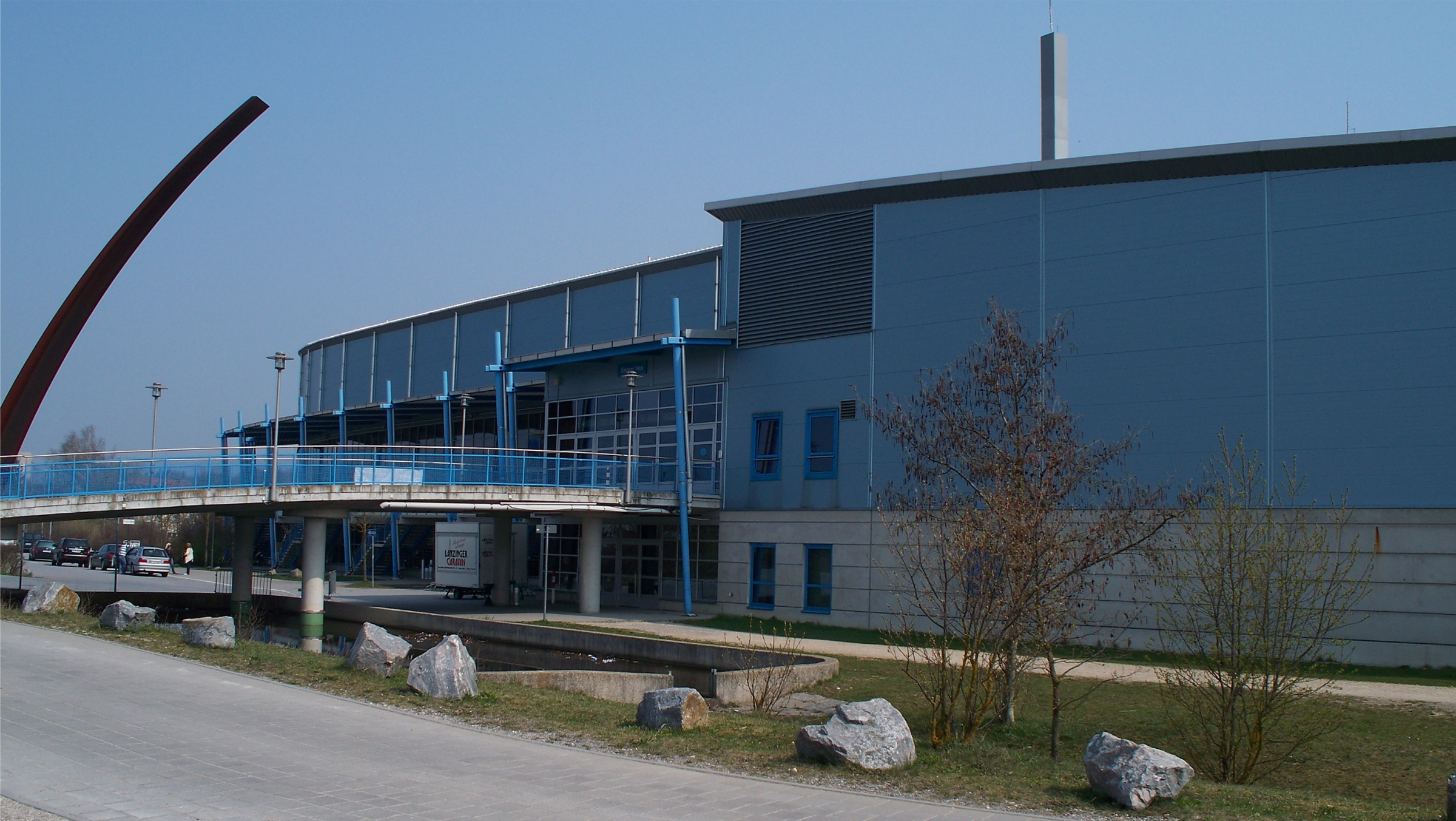
- Interactive map of Donau-Arena
- Location: Regensburg, Germany
- Operator: Regensburger Badebetriebe GmbH
- Capacity: 7.600 (concerts); 5.500 (Handball); 4.961 (Ice hockey)

Construction
- Opened: 1999

Tenants
- EV Regensburg (1999-present); EHC Regensburg (1999-present); EC Regensburg (1999-present)

Donau Arena is an arena in Regensburg, Germany. The arena opened in 2001 and holds 4,936 people.

It is primarily used for ice hockey, specifically the Eisbären Regensburg hockey team. When the rink is not in use for hockey, it is open to public ice skating.

- Bob Dylan performed at the arena during his 2000 European Tour on May 25, 2000.
- P!nk Performed at the arena on March 5, 2009, during her Funhouse Tour.
