= German Ice Hockey Championship =

The German Ice Hockey Championship was a former ice hockey competition played in Germany between 1912 and 1948. During its earliest seasons Berliner Schlittschuhclub emerged as one of the strongest teams, winning eighteen titles between 1912 and 1944. Following the partition of Germany it was replaced by the Oberliga FDR in West Germany and the DDR-Oberliga in East Germany.

== 1912–1948 ==
Season	Club
1912	Berliner Schlittschuhclub
1913	Berliner Schlittschuhclub
1914	Berliner Schlittschuhclub
1915–19	no championship due to World War I
1920	Berliner Schlittschuhclub
1921	Berliner Schlittschuhclub
1922	MTV München
1923	Berliner Schlittschuhclub
1924	Berliner Schlittschuhclub
1925	Berliner Schlittschuhclub
1926	Berliner Schlittschuhclub
1927	SC Riessersee
1928	Berliner Schlittschuhclub
1929	Berliner Schlittschuhclub
1930	Berliner Schlittschuhclub
1931	Berliner Schlittschuhclub
1932	Berliner Schlittschuhclub
1933	Berliner Schlittschuhclub
1934	SC Brandenburg Berlin
1935	SC Riessersee
1936	Berliner Schlittschuhclub
1937	Berliner Schlittschuhclub
1938	SC Riessersee
1939	Engelmann Wien
1940	Wiener EV
1941	SC Riessersee
1942	not completed
1943	not completed
1944	KG Berliner Schlittschuhclub/SC Brandenburg Berlin
1945	no championship
1946	no official championship
1947	SC Riessersee
1948	SC Riessersee
