= Starbulls Rosenheim =

- City: Rosenheim, Oberbayern
- League: DEL2
- Founded: 1928; 98 years ago
- Home arena: SPIE Arena (capacity: 4,425)
- Colours: Green, white, red, black
- General manager: Christoph Sandner
- Head coach: Jari Pasanen
- Captain: C.J. Stretch
- Website: www.starbulls.de

Franchise history
- To 1978: EV Rosenheim
- 1978–1994: Sportbund DJK Rosenheim
- 1994–2000: Star Bulls Rosenheim GmbH
- 2000–present: Starbulls Rosenheim e.V.

The Starbulls Rosenheim are a professional ice hockey team based in Rosenheim, Germany. The team competes in the DEL2, the second highest level of play in professional German ice hockey. They play their home games at the SPIE Arena.

The team joined SB/DJK Rosenheim in 1979, after EV Rosenheim had folded, and in 1994 the team adopted their current name. The team played in the Deutsche Eishockey Liga (DEL) from 1995-2000. In 2000, the Star Bulls Rosenheim sold their DEL licence to the Iserlohn Roosters. The current team Starbulls Rosenheim e.V. was founded on May 23, 2000 and had to restart in the lowest league the Bezirksliga.

== Achievements ==
- (gold) West German championship: 1982, 1985, 1989
- (gold) Deutscher Eishockey-Pokal (DEB-Pokal): 2011

== Players ==
=== Roster season 2025/26 ===
Updated March 28, 2025

#	Nat	Player	Pos	S/G	Age	Acquired	Place of birth
8	(Germany)	Lukas Laub	LW/RW	L	32	2022	Rosenheim, Germany
9	(Germany)	Simon Gnyp	D	L	24	2024	Burghausen, Germany
12	(United States)	C.J. Stretch (C)	C	R	36	2023	Irvine, California
14	(Germany)	Dominik Tiffels	D	R	32	2024	Cologne, Germany
18	(Germany)	Sebastian Zwickl	F	L	19	Junior	Rosenheim, Germany
20	(Germany)	Manuel Strodel (A)	LW/RW	L	34	2022	Buchloe, Germany
21	(Finland) (Germany)	Ville Järveläinen	RW	R	33	2024	Hämeenlinna, Finland
28	(Germany)	Dominik Kolb	D/F	L	29	2020	Munich, Germany
35	(Finland)	Oskar Autio	G	L	26	2024	Espoo, Finland
50	(Germany)	Tobias Beck	D	L	23	2024	Prien am Chiemsee, Germany
57	(Canada)	Charlie Sarault (A)	C	L	34	2024	Fournier, Ontario
60	(Canada)	Shane Hanna	D	L	32	2023	New Westminster, British Columbia
72	(Germany) (Italy)	Pascal Seidel	G	L	23	Loan	Neuss, Germany
76	(Germany)	Kilian Kühnhauser	D	L	21	Junior	Rosenheim, Germany
89	(Germany)	Stefan Reiter	F	R	29	2022	Munich, Germany
98	(Germany)	Maximilian Vollmayer	D/F	R	30	2014	Ebersberg, Germany

=== Honored numbers ===
Above the media wall, under the stadium roof there are banners of the following players, honoring their contributions to the organization. However, their numbers aren't retired, as Mitch Stephens wore number 27 between 2009 and 2012. Denis Shevyrin wore number 15 in season 2023/24.

#	Nat	Player	Pos	Career
15	(Germany)	Horst-Peter Kretschmer	D	1981–1992
23	(Canada) (Germany)	Ron Fischer	D	1986–1996
25	(Germany)	Raimund Hilger	F	1983–1985; 1986–1992; 1994–1997; 1998–2000; 2001–2011
27	(Canada) (Germany)	Karl Friesen	G	1980–1985; 1986–1992; 1995–1996
29	(Germany)	Ernst Höfner	C/LW	1982–1992

=== Former players ===
before 2000

- Jamie Masters
- Dale Derkatch
- Ron Fischer
- Karl Friesen
- Dieter Hegen
- Mike Heidt
- Ernst Höfner
- Jiří Holík
- Udo Kiessling
- Oldřich Machač
- Robert Müller
- Jeff Embersits
- Jaroslav Pouzar
- Franz Reindl
- Dominic Roussel (two games)
- Joel Savage
- Gordon Sherven
- Doug Weight
- Joachim Reil
- Horst-Peter Kretschmer
- Franz Kummer
- Jim Hiller

since 2000

- Raimund Hilger
- Claus Dalpiaz
- Martin Reichel
- Stephan Gottwald
- Norm Maracle
- Cory Quirk
- Stephen Werner
- Kim Staal
- Pasi Hakkinen
- Dominic Auger
- Shawn Weller
- Michael Rohner

== Season-by-season record ==
Note: GP = Games, W = Wins, OTW = Overtime Wins, SOW = Shoot-out Wins, L = Losses, OTL – Overtime Losses, SOL = Shoot-out Losses, GF = Goals For, GA = Goals Against

Point System: Win = 3 points; OT/SO Win = 2 points, OTL/SOL = 1point

Source: Elite Prospects

Season	League	GP	W	OTW	SOW	L	OTL	SOL	Points	Finish	GF	GA	Postseason
2022–23	Oberliga Süd	48	36	0	1	9	2	0	112	2nd	169	83	Won the final against Blue Devils Weiden 3:1 (best of five series)
2023–24	DEL2	52	17	5	3	20	5	1	73	11th	153	174	Saved in first round of relegation against Bietigheim Steelers 4:1 (best of seven series, two matches advantage)
2024–25	DEL2	52	23	4	3	15	5	2	90	5th	158	132	Quarter final loss against Dresdner Eislöwen 1:4 (best of seven series)
2025–26	DEL2	52	24	7	2	12	6	1	97	3rd	164	124	Quarter final loss against Eisbären Regensburg 2:4 (best of seven series)
2026–27	DEL2												

== Former coaches ==
before 2000

- Jano Starsi
- Pavel Wohl
- Xaver Unsinn
- Hans Rampf
- Jiri Capla
- Gerhard Kießling

since 2000

- Gerhard Graf
- Franz Fritzmeier
- Ron Chyzowski
- Markus Berwanger
- Franz Steer (2008 - 2017)
- Manuel Kofler (2017 - 2019)
- John Sicinski (2019 - 2022)
