= EK Engelmann Wien =

- City: Vienna, Austria
- League: Austrian Hockey League
- Founded: 1922; 104 years ago
- Home arena: Wiener Heurmarkt

Franchise history
- 1922-1932: Pötzleinsdorfer SK
- 1932-1957: EK Engelmann Wien

EK Engelmann Wien was an ice hockey team in Vienna, Austria. They played in the Austrian Hockey League, the top level of ice hockey in Austria.

== History ==
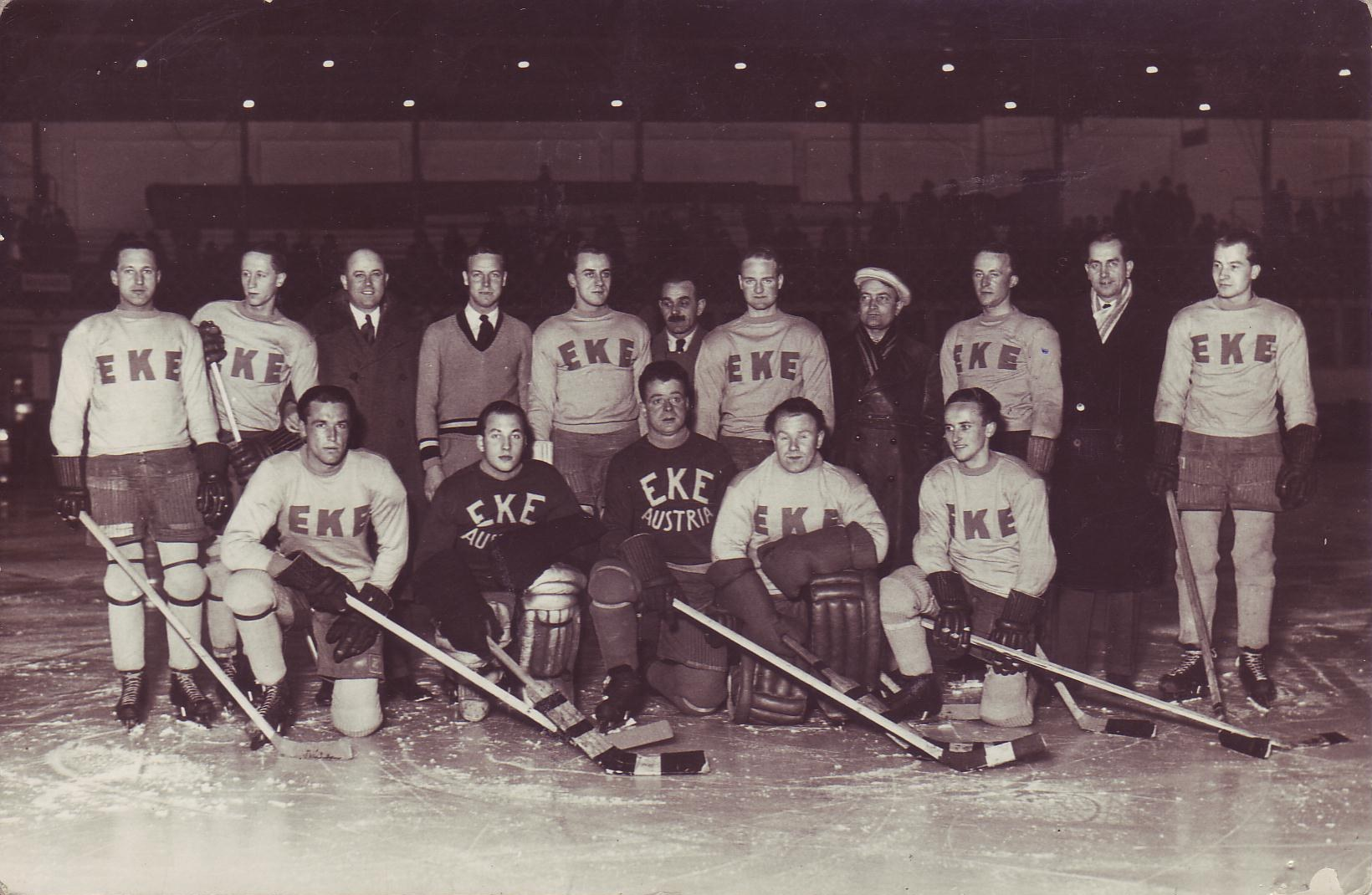
EK Engelmann Wien in the 1930s.

The club was founded in 1922 as Pötzleinsdorfer SK. Wien won five Austrian (one as Pötzleinsdorfer SK) titles, and one German title, in 1939, as Austria was occupied by Germany at the time.

== Achievements ==
- Austrian champion (5) :1932 (as Pötzleinsdorfer SK), 1938, 1946, 1956, 1957
- German champion (1) : 1939
