= Berliner Schlittschuhclub =

Berliner Schlittschuh-Club e.V.
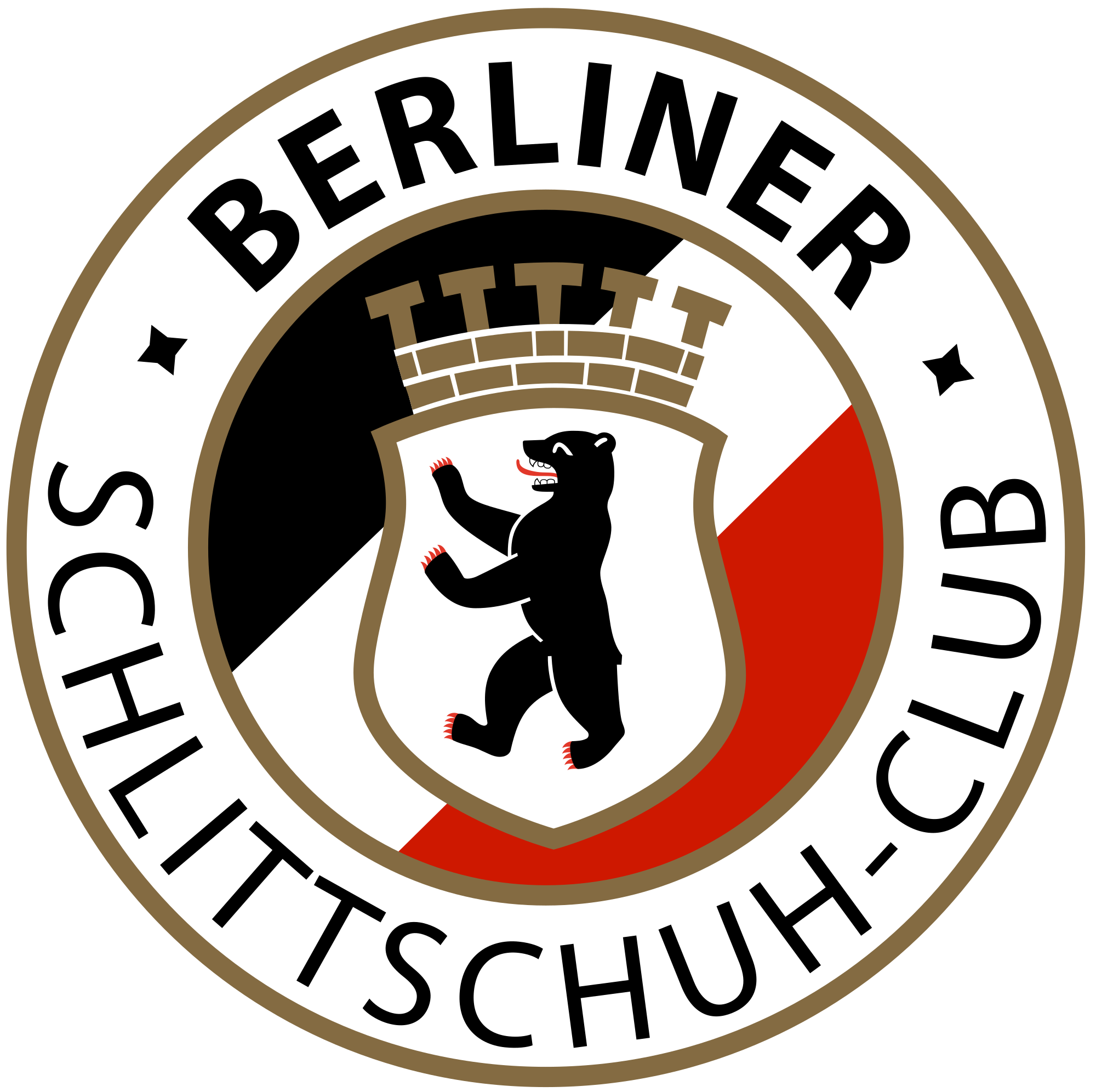
- City: Berlin, Germany
- League: Landesliga Berlin
- Founded: 1893 (club); 1908 (ice hockey)
- Home arena: Eissporthalle Charlottenburg
- Colours
- Website: www.berliner-schlittschuh.club

Franchise history
- 1908–1945: Berliner Schlittschuh-Club 1893
- 1945–1951: EG Berlin-Eichkamp
- 1951–1981: Berliner Schlittschuh-Club 1893
- 1981–1982: Berliner Schlittschuh-Club Eishockey
- 1983–1992: Berliner Schlittschuh-Club 1893
- 1992–1997: Berliner Schlittschuh-Club Eishockey
- 1997–2007: Berliner Schlittschuh-Club 1893
- 2007–2008: Berliner Schlittschuh-Club 2007 Eissport
- 2008–2020: Eissport- und Schlittschuh-Club 2007 Berlin
- 2020–present: Berliner Schlittschuh-Club

Berliner Schlittschuhclub, also known as Berliner SC or BSchC, is an ice hockey club based in Berlin, Germany. They currently play in the Landesliga, the fifth and lowest tier in their region. The ice hockey section was founded in 1908.

The club has won a record twenty German ice hockey championships as well as three Spengler Cups.

== History ==
The club was founded in 1893 and formed an ice hockey section in 1908, who won the City of Berlin Championship in 1910. When the German Ice Hockey Championship was introduced in 1912, the club dominated, winning seventeen titles between 1912 and 1937. In 1923, Berliner SC played the final of the first-ever Spengler Cup in Davos, losing 3-7 to Oxford University team, and won the very next tournament in 1924, beating HC Davos in the final. Another German title was added in 1944 in the final season contested during the Second World War, by a wartime combined team of Berliner SC and SC Brandenburg Berlin playing as Kriegsspielgemeinschaft Berlin.

After the Second World War, the club played under the name of EG Berlin-Eichkamp, before being renamed Berliner Schlittschuchclub again in 1951. As EG Berlin-Eichkamp, they finished as runner-up in the German Championships in 1947 and 1949.

In the 1958–59 season, the club continued playing in the Oberliga, but did not qualify for the newly founded Ice hockey Bundesliga. They remained in the second tier Oberliga for most of the 60s, except 1966–67, before they were promoted to the Bundesliga for the 1972–73 season.

Berliner SC won the ice hockey Bundesliga title in 1974, for the first time since 1944, and won the title again two years later, in 1976.

In 1981 the ice hockey section was split from the main club, as Berliner Schlittschuh-Club Eishockey e. V. After just one season, BSchC had to withdraw from the Bundesliga due to financial problems. The club's team switched to the newly founded BSC Preussen that was formed together with the ice hockey section of BFC Preussen. BSC Preussen started in the 2nd Bundesliga and later played in the Bundesliga and Deutsche Eishockey Liga before dropping to lower leagues and folding in 2005.

BSchC remained as a club and started a new ice hockey section in 1983, in the fourth tier Regionalliga Nord. Winning promotion in their first season, they played in the Oberliga until they withdrew after the 1986–87 season. The team continued in lower divisions. In 1991, the ice hockey section of Berliner SV Akademie der Wissenschaften who had earned a place in the Regionalliga Nord joined BSchC. In 1992, the ice hockey section was once again split from the main club as Berliner Schlittschuh-Club Eishockey and played in the Oberliga and 2. Liga (both third tier at the time) in some of the following years. Later the ice hockey club rejoined the main club BSchC. In 2004, BSchC entered a cooperation with the BC Preussen, the former Berlin Capitals who played in the Oberliga after filing for bankruptcy, for the 2004–05 Oberliga season. The combined club played as BSC Preussen once again before folding after just one season. BSchC continued on its own in 2005.

In 2007, the main club Berliner Schlittschuhclub expelled its ice hockey section which was therefore reformed as a new club, first as Berliner Schlittschuh-Club 2007 Eissport, then as Eissport- und Schlittschuh-Club 2007 Berlin (ESC 2007 Berlin). ESC played in the Verbandsliga, Regionalliga (4th tier), and since 2018 Landesliga Berlin (fifth tier). In summer 2020, ESC changed its name to Berliner Schlittschuh-Club. In 2020, the unofficial successor of BSC Preussen, ECC Preussen, went bankrupt and folded. Their seconds side switched to BSchC. Starting in the 2020–21 season, BSchC has therefore fielded two sides in the Landesliga Berlin.

== Arenas ==
- Sportpalast (before 1973): A multi-purpose arena constructed in 1910, Berliner SC played here before the Second World War. The Sportpalast was also used for cycling races, boxing and other sport events, concerts, and political events, most famously Joseph Goebbels' speech which was named after the arena. The palace was badly damaged in a 1944 air raid. After the war it was again used for ice hockey, this time as an open-air venue before a new roof was added in 1953. The Sportpalast was torn down in 1973.
- Eisstadion Wedding (1967–1973): Opened in 1967 in Wedding as an open-air rink with room for 3,500 spectators. BSchC played here as it was a more modern venue than the Sportpalast. In 1982/83 a roof was added, and in 1987 it was renamed Erika-Heß-Eisstadion. The Eisstadion Neukölln was occasionally used as well in this period.
- Eissporthalle an der Jafféstraße (1973–1982): Opened in 1973 as a 6,000-seat indoor arena. BSchC played here until their withdrawal from the Bundesliga. BSC Preussen took over as West Berlin's main ice hockey club and continued to play at the venue until it was demolished in 2001.
- Eissporthalle Charlottenburg (since 2012): After the demolition of the Eissporthalle an der Jafféstraße and later also the Deutschlandhalle (closed in 2009), the Eissporthalle Charlottenburg was built as a new venue for ice hockey in western Berlin. It is much smaller than its predecessors with a capacity of 1,000. The Landesliga Berlin, including BSchC, plays in multiple venues all over Berlin without set home venues for each club.

== Achievements ==
- German Championship
  - Champion (20) : 1912, 1913, 1914, 1920, 1921, 1923, 1924, 1925, 1926, 1928, 1929, 1930, 1931, 1932, 1933, 1936, 1937, 1944 ( as KSG Berlin), 1974, 1976
  - Runner-up (6) : 1922, 1939, 1940, 1947, 1975, 1978
- Berlin Championship
  - Champion (20) : 1910, 1913, 1914, 1921, 1923, 1928, 1930, 1932, 1933, 1934, 1935, 1937, 1938, 1940, 1947, 1949, 1950, 1954, 1955, 1957
- Oberliga (as 2nd tier)
  - Champion (1) : 1972

=== Pre-season ===
- Spengler Cup
  - Winner (3) : 1924, 1926, 1928.
  - Runner-up (4) : 1923, 1927, 1931, 1941

== Notable players ==
- (Germany) Alfred Steinke (1901–1930), German Ice Hockey Hall of Fame inductee
- (Sweden) Nils Molander (1912–1928), Swedish Hockey Hall of Fame inductee
- (Switzerland) Max Holsboer (1917–1931)
- (Sweden) Birger Holmqvist (1921–1926), Olympic silver medallist (1928), Swedish Hockey Hall of Fame inductee
- (Sweden) Gustaf Johansson (1921–1928), Swedish Hockey Hall of Fame inductee
- (Germany) Erich Römer (1920s–30s), Olympic bronze medalist (1932), German Ice Hockey Hall of Fame inductee
- (Germany) Gustav Jaenecke (1923–1944), Olympic bronze medalist (1932), IIHF Hall of Fame, and German Ice Hockey Hall of Fame inductee
- (Germany) Rudi Ball (1928–1933, 1936–1944), IIHF Hall of Fame, and German Ice Hockey Hall of Fame inductee
- (Germany) Heinz Henschel (1930s–50s), IIHF Hall of Fame, and German Ice Hockey Hall of Fame inductee
- (Germany) Lorenz Funk (1972–1982), German Ice Hockey Hall of Fame inductee
- (Germany) Xaver Unsinn (coach, 1972–1977), IIHF Hall of Fame, and German Ice Hockey Hall of Fame inductee
- (Germany) Ernst Köpf (1973–1976, 1977–1978), Olympic bronze medalist (1976), German Ice Hockey Hall of Fame inductee
- (Germany) Stefan Metz (1973–1978), Olympic bronze medalist (1976), German Ice Hockey Hall of Fame inductee
- (Germany) Martin Hinterstocker (1974–1976), Olympic bronze medallist (1976), German Ice Hockey Hall of Fame inductee
- (Germany) René Bielke (1996–1997), multiple East German championships as a player, and German women's championships as coach
