= EV Füssen =

- City: Füssen, Allgäu
- League: Oberliga
- Founded: December 11, 1922
- Home arena: BSP Arena
- Colours
- President: Jörg Noack
- Head coach: Juhani Matikainen
- Captain: Julian Straub
- Farm club: SC Ziegelwies (1958–1968)
- Website: www.evfuessen.de

EV Füssen, previously also called the Füssen Leopards, is an ice hockey team from Germany. They play their home games at the Bundesleistungszentrum für Eishockey (BLZ-Arena), located in Füssen, Allgäu. They currently play in the third level of German ice hockey, the Oberliga.

The club is one of the most successful in Germany, having won sixteen national titles, its last championship coming in 1973.

== History ==
The club was formed on 11 December 1922 as an ice skating club. The club's ice hockey department was formed two years later and began playing competitive games the following year when it took on the reserves of SC Riessersee. In 1935 the club reached the final of the German championship for the first time but lost to SC Riessersee.

When the club restarted its ice hockey department in 1945, after the Second World War, it found that of the twelve players it had before the war ten had either been killed in action or were still kept as prisoners of war. The club quickly recovered from this however and, by 1949, won its first of sixteen national titles. The club's fortunes greatly improved from 1952 when it hired Canadian coach Frank Trottier, winning seven consecutive championships from then on. In 1958 the club became one of the eight founding members of the new Ice hockey Bundesliga and its first champion, now under coach Markus Egen. Füssen was to become the league's most successful club, winning nine titles in the 36 seasons the Bundesliga existed until 1994.

The club won its last German championship in 1973 but then had to clear the field for the more prosperous clubs from the larger cities, finding itself unable to compete financially. Eventually, in 1983, EVF was relegated from the Bundesliga, permanently leaving top level ice hockey in Germany behind.

Since then, the club has been fluctuating between Oberliga and 2nd Bundesliga, occasionally brushing with financial collapse like in 1983, when it became insolvent. The club, like other small town Bavarian clubs, has an excellent youth program but finds itself unable to retain its best players who, in most cases, move to financially more potent clubs.

The club used to play its home games at the Kobelhang Stadium which held almost 15,000 in the early days but was later reduced to 7,000. In the late 1970s, the club took up the Bundesleistungszentrum as its home ground.

After an insolvency in 2015 the club had to drop to the lowest tier of ice hockey in Bavaria, the Bezirksliga, winning its division in 2015–16.

== Honours ==
- German championship:
  - Winners (16) : 1949, 1953, 1954, 1955, 1956, 1957, 1958, 1959, 1961, 1963, 1964, 1965, 1968, 1969, 1971, 1973
  - Runner-up: (7) 1935, 1944, 1951, 1960, 1962, 1966, 1972

=== Pre-season ===
- Spengler Cup:
  - Winners (2) : 1952, 1964
