= SC Riessersee =

- City: Garmisch-Partenkirchen, Oberbayern
- League: Oberliga (ice hockey)
- Founded: 1923
- Home arena: Olympia-Eissport-Zentrum (capacity: 6,929)
- Colours: Blue, white
- Head coach: Pat Cortina
- Captain: Florian Vollmer
- Website: www.scriessersee.de www.scr.de

Schlittschuh Club Riessersee, commonly known simply as SC Reissersee, is a professional ice hockey team based in Garmisch-Partenkirchen, Oberbayern, Germany. They currently play in the Oberliga, the third level of ice hockey in Germany. Prior to the 2013–14 season, they played in the 2nd Bundesliga. They play their home games at the Olympia-Eissport-Zentrum.

The club is the most historic club in the German professional league, with the most German championships.

Famous players who played in the club are the current president of the German Icehockey Federation Franz Reindl and Ignaz Berndaner, both local players and national players and Olympic medallists in the 1976 Olympic games at Innsbruck.

SC Riessersee has played in its history 26 championship finals, being considered today a cult club in German sports.

== Achievements ==
- German championship:
  - Winners (10): 1927, 1935, 1938, 1941, 1947, 1948, 1950, 1960, 1978, 1981
  - Finalist (16): 1925, 1928, 1929, 1932, 1933, 1934, 1936, 1937, 1942, 1943, 1952, 1953, 1956, 1957, 1958, 1979
- German Oberliga Champion:
  - Winners (1): 2011
- Basler Cup champion (3): 1954, 1955, 1956

== Famous players and coaches ==
In the Hall of Fame of the German Ice Hockey Museum are persons who have made a special contribution to the ice hockey sport in Germany. So far 19 players and coaches from the club have been admitted to the Hall of Fame.

Bibi Torriani coached SC Riessersee during the 1957–58 season, and was later inducted into the IIHF Hall of Fame as a player.

== NHL Players at the SC Riessersee ==
At the beginning of October 2012 during the 2012–13 NHL lockout in the National Hockey League, forward Matt D'Agostini of the St. Louis Blues and Rick DiPietro of the New York Islanders played at the SC Riessersee. In November 2012, Ottawa Senators forward, Erik Condra, also joined the team.

Current Chicago Blackhawks forward and olympic silver medallist Dominik Kahun played for SC Riessersee in September and October 2014 in the beginning of his career.
