= 2013–14 Oberliga (ice hockey) season =

2013–14 Oberliga season
- League: Oberliga
- Sport: Ice Hockey
- Duration: 4 October 2013 – 23 March 2014
- Number of teams: 39
- TV partner(s): Sprade TV (select teams)

Regular season
- Season champions: Hannover Scorpions (North); VER Selb (South); Icefighters Leipzig (East); Löwen Frankfurt (West)
- Top scorer: Andreas Morczinietz (North); Kyle Piwowarczyk (South); Adam Sergerie (East)
- Promoted to DEL2: Löwen Frankfurt; EC Kassel Huskies
- Relegated to Regionalliga: Schweinfurt Mighty Dogs (withdrew from league)

Playoffs
- Champions: No champion (Championship playoffs not contested)

Oberliga seasons
- ← 2012–13 2014–15 →

The 2013/14 Oberliga season was the 55th season of the Oberliga, the third-tier of German ice hockey. For the fourth time in history, the Oberliga was split into four regional leagues (North, South, East, West). 39 teams competed in the season that spanned from 4 October 2013 till 21 April 2014. There was no Oberliga champion in 2013/14, due to an expanded DEL2 promotion stage replacing the Oberliga Championship playoffs. Löwen Frankfurt and EC Kassel Huskies secured promotion to DEL2. Schweinfurt Mighty Dogs was the only team relegated to Regionalliga.

== Oberliga North ==
Operated by the German Ice Hockey Federation (DEB), Oberliga North had three new teams for 2013/14 for a total of nine teams. EC Harzer Falken were promoted from Regionalliga North, Hannover Scorpions were demoted from DEL after their licence was sold and Hannover Indians were demoted from 2. Bundesliga due to bankruptcy. The regular Oberliga North season operated a 32 match format with each team playing each other four times. The top four teams qualifying for the DEL2 promotion play-offs and the bottom five teams progressing to the Oberliga Nord Pokal (Oberliga North Cup).

=== Regular season ===
Pos	Team	Pld	W	OTW	OTL	L	GF	GA	GD	Pts	Qualification or relegation
1	Hannover Scorpions	32	28	0	1	3	222	74	+148	85	2014 DEL2 Promotion Playoffs
2	EHC Timmendorfer Strand 06	32	21	3	0	8	194	113	+81	69	2014 DEL2 Promotion Playoffs
3	Hannover Indians	32	20	4	1	7	164	83	+81	69	2014 DEL2 Promotion Playoffs
4	Rostock Piranhas	32	20	0	1	11	184	143	+41	61	2014 DEL2 Promotion Playoffs
5	Hamburger SV	32	13	2	1	16	116	133	−17	44	2014 Oberliga Nord Pokal
6	EC Harzer Falken	32	13	1	1	17	121	138	−17	42	2014 Oberliga Nord Pokal
7	Adendorfer EC	32	8	1	4	19	115	169	−54	30	2014 Oberliga Nord Pokal
8	Hamburg Crocodiles	32	5	0	2	25	108	281	−173	17	2014 Oberliga Nord Pokal
9	Grafschafter EC	32	3	2	2	25	102	192	−90	15	2014 Oberliga Nord Pokal

Source: www.pointstreak.com
Rules for classification:
Tie-break: 1) points; 2) goal difference; 3) number of goals scored
Points: 3 points for regulation win; 2 points for OT or SO win; 1 point for OT or SO loss; 0 points for regulation loss

=== Oberliga Nord Pokal ===
Qualification
-	Hamburg Crocodiles	2
-	Grafschafter EC	1

Semi-finals
1	Hamburger SV	2
4	Hamburg Crocodiles	1
2	EC Harzer Falken	2
3	Adendorfer EC	0

Nord Pokal Final
1	Hamburger SV	0
2	EC Harzer Falken	2

Format: Best of three match series' for qualification and main rounds
Source: www.pointstreak.com

== Oberliga South ==
Operated by the German Ice Hockey Federation (DEB), Oberliga South covers the states of Baden-Württemberg and Bavaria. Oberliga South had one new team for 2013/14 for a total of twelve teams. EHC Bayreuth was promoted and joined the league as champions of Regionalliga Süd-West. With no team relegated from 2. Bundesliga to Oberliga South, Erding Gladiators were permitted to remain in the league rather than being relegated to the Regionalliga. Oberliga South regular season ran from 20 September 2013 till 23 February 2014 and saw the twelve teams play a 44 match season with each team playing each other four times. The top eight teams qualified for the DEL2 promotion play-offs while the bottom four teams progressed to the Bayernliga relegation play-offs.

=== Regular season ===
Pos	Team	Pld	W	OTW	OTL	L	GF	GA	GD	Pts	Qualification or relegation
1	VER Selb	44	31	4	2	7	202	110	+92	103	2014 DEL2; Promotion Playoffs
2	EHC Freiburg	44	24	5	3	12	164	117	+47	85	2014 DEL2; Promotion Playoffs
3	Tölzer Löwen	44	22	5	5	12	169	127	+42	81	2014 DEL2; Promotion Playoffs
4	EHC Bayreuth	44	23	3	2	16	177	136	+41	77	2014 DEL2; Promotion Playoffs
5	EHC Klostersee	44	22	1	3	18	139	140	−1	71	2014 DEL2; Promotion Playoffs
6	EC Peiting	44	20	2	3	19	153	145	+8	67	2014 DEL2; Promotion Playoffs
7	EV Füssen	44	18	2	8	16	176	173	+3	66	2014 DEL2; Promotion Playoffs
8	Erding Gladiators	44	15	7	4	18	168	181	−13	63	2014 DEL2; Promotion Playoffs
9	EV Regensburg	44	12	7	7	18	135	160	−25	57	2014 Bayernliga; Relegation Playoffs
10	Deggendorfer SC	44	14	4	2	24	144	188	−44	52	2014 Bayernliga; Relegation Playoffs
11	EV Weiden Blue Devils	44	9	5	4	26	129	198	−69	41	2014 Bayernliga; Relegation Playoffs
12	Schweinfurt Mighty Dogs (R)	44	4	5	7	28	128	209	−81	29	2014 Bayernliga; Relegation Playoffs

Source: www.pointstreak.com
Rules for classification:
Tie-break: 1) points; 2) goal difference; 3) number of goals scored
Points: 3 points for regulation win; 2 points for OT or SO win; 1 point for OT or SO loss; 0 points for regulation loss
(R) Relegated

=== Relegation play-offs ===
The bottom four teams from the regular season compete in the Bayernliga relegation play-offs. The play-offs consists of two rounds. The losers from round one progress to round two. The loser of round two is relegated to the Bayernliga. EV Weiden Blue Devils lost the relegation play-offs and were set to be relegated until the Schweinfurt Mighty Dogs withdrew from the league and were relegated in Weiden's place.

Round 1
1	EV Regensburg	1
4	Schweinfurt Mighty Dogs	3
3	Deggendorfer SC	3
2	EV Weiden	1

Round 2
EV Regensburg	3
EV Weiden	1

Format: Best of five match series' for both rounds
Source: www.pointstreak.com

== Oberliga East ==
Operated by the Berlin Ice Sports Association (LEV-Berlin), Oberliga East covers the states of Berlin, Brandenburg, Saxony, Saxony-Anhalt and Thuringia. Oberliga East had one team change from the previous season. ECC Preussen Berlin withdrew from the league, leaving Oberliga East with eight teams. The format for the regular season saw each team play each other four times for a total of 28 matches. The top two teams in the standings at the end of the regular season qualify for the DEL2 promotion play-offs and the bottom six teams progress to the Oberliga Ost Pokal (Oberliga East Cup).

=== Regular season ===
Pos	Team	Pld	W	OTW	OTL	L	GF	GA	GD	Pts	Qualification or relegation
1	Icefighters Leipzig	28	19	4	0	5	163	109	+54	65	2014 DEL2 Promotion Playoffs
2	EHC Erfurt Black Dragons	28	16	3	3	6	146	102	+44	57	2014 DEL2 Promotion Playoffs
3	Saale Bulls Halle	28	17	2	1	8	113	88	+25	56	2014 Oberliga East Pokal
4	EHV 09 Schönheider Wölfe	28	10	3	4	11	120	125	−5	40	2014 Oberliga East Pokal
5	ELV Tornado Niesky	28	10	2	4	12	93	102	−9	38	2014 Oberliga East Pokal
6	FASS Berlin	28	9	1	3	15	101	122	−21	32	2014 Oberliga East Pokal
7	ERV Chemnitz 07	28	7	2	5	14	89	122	−33	30	2014 Oberliga East Pokal
8	EHC Jonsdorfer Falken	28	4	3	0	21	98	153	−55	18	2014 Oberliga East Pokal

Source: www.pointstreak.com
Rules for classification:
Tie-break: 1) points; 2) goal difference; 3) number of goals scored
Points: 3 points for regulation win; 2 points for OT or SO win; 1 point for OT or SO loss; 0 points for regulation loss

=== Oberliga Ost Pokal ===
The bottom six teams from the regular season progressed to the Ost Pokal. The Ost Pokal involved two stages, a group stage and an elimination stage. The group stage saw the six teams split into two groups of three teams and was contested between 14 February and 2 March 2014. The top two teams of each group progressed to the elimination stage, which involved three match series' for the semi-finals and final. The elimination matches were played between 7 March and 22 March 2014.

Group stage

Group A

Pos	Team	Pld	W	OTW	OTL	L	GF	GA	GD	Pts	Qualification or relegation
1	ELV Tornado Niesky	4	3	0	0	1	18	12	+6	9	Pokal elimination stage
2	Saale Bulls Halle	4	1	1	0	2	15	12	+3	5	Pokal elimination stage
3	ERV Chemnitz 07	4	1	0	1	2	11	20	−9	4	

Source: www.pointstreak.com
Rules for classification:
Tie-break: 1) points; 2) goal difference; 3) number of goals scored
Points: 3 points for regulation win; 2 points for OT or SO win; 1 point for OT or SO loss; 0 points for regulation loss

Group B

Pos	Team	Pld	W	OTW	OTL	L	GF	GA	GD	Pts	Qualification or relegation
1	EHV 09 Schönheider Wölfe	4	3	0	0	1	19	15	+4	9	Pokal elimination stage
2	EHC Jonsdorfer Falken	4	2	0	0	2	15	17	−2	6	Pokal elimination stage
3	FASS Berlin	4	1	0	0	3	15	17	−2	3	

Source: www.pointstreak.com
Rules for classification:
Tie-break: 1) points; 2) goal difference; 3) number of goals scored
Points: 3 points for regulation win; 2 points for OT or SO win; 1 point for OT or SO loss; 0 points for regulation loss

Elimination stage

Semi-finals
1	ELV Tornado Niesky	2
4	EHC Jonsdorfer Falken	1
3	Saale Bulls Halle	2
2	EHV Schönheide 09	0

Ost Pokal Final
ELV Tornado Niesky	0
Saale Bulls Halle	2

Format: Best of three match series' for both rounds
Source: www.pointstreak.com

== Oberliga West ==
Operated by the Ice Sports Association North Rhine-Westphalia (LEV-NRW), Oberliga West covers the states of Hessen, North Rhine-Westphalia, Rhineland-Palatinate and Saarland. For 2013/14, Oberliga West had ten participating teams. Team changes from the previous season included, Rote Teufel Bad Nauheim (promoted to DEL2), Krefeld EV 1981 U23 (withdrawn from league), EHC Neuwied and Herford EV (relegated to Regionalliga West), Herner EV 2007, Grefrather EG and Neusser EV (promoted from Regionalliga West) and EHC Dortmund (withdrawn due to missing cut-off date to register team).

The Oberliga West regular season ran from 27 September till 20 December 2013. The league operated with each team playing each other team twice for a total of 18 matches. The top six in the standings qualified for the DEL2 promotion playoffs as well as the Oberliga West championship round. The bottom four teams progressed to the relegation round and were joined by four Regionalliga West teams.

=== Regular season ===
Pos	Team	Pld	W	OTW	OTL	L	GF	GA	GD	Pts	Qualification or relegation
1	Löwen Frankfurt	18	17	1	0	0	165	35	+130	53	Championship round
2	EC Kassel Huskies	18	14	1	0	3	140	40	+100	44	Championship round
3	Füchse Duisburg	18	13	1	1	3	102	44	+58	42	Championship round
4	Lippe-Hockey-Hamm	18	11	0	1	6	105	68	+37	34	Championship round
5	Königsborner JEC	18	9	1	0	8	90	63	+27	29	Championship round
6	Herner EV 2007	18	6	2	2	8	83	72	+11	24	Championship round
7	ESC Moskitos Essen	18	5	0	4	9	78	111	−33	19	Relegation round
8	Grefrather EG	18	3	1	0	14	52	115	−63	11	Relegation round
9	Ratinger Ice Aliens	18	3	1	0	14	59	131	−72	11	Relegation round
10	Neusser EV	18	1	0	0	17	41	236	−195	3	Relegation round

Source: www.oddsportal.com
Rules for classification:
Tie-break: 1) points; 2) goal difference; 3) number of goals scored
Points: 3 points for regulation win; 2 points for OT or SO win; 1 point for OT or SO loss; 0 points for regulation loss

=== Championship round ===
Pos	Team	Pld	W	OTW	OTL	L	GF	GA	GD	Pts	Qualification or relegation
1	Löwen Frankfurt	20	19	1	0	0	125	30	+95	59	2014 DEL2 Promotion Playoffs
2	EC Kassel Huskies	20	13	0	1	6	103	58	+45	40	2014 DEL2 Promotion Playoffs
3	Füchse Duisburg	20	11	2	0	7	90	59	+31	37	2014 DEL2 Promotion Playoffs
4	Lippe-Hockey-Hamm	20	6	1	3	10	59	112	−53	23	2014 DEL2 Promotion Playoffs
5	Herner EV 2007	20	2	1	3	14	68	125	−57	11	2014 DEL2 Promotion Playoffs
6	Königsborner JEC	20	2	2	0	16	58	119	−61	10	2014 DEL2 Promotion Playoffs

Source: www.oddsportal.com
Rules for classification:
Tie-break: 1) points; 2) goal difference; 3) number of goals scored
Points: 3 points for regulation win; 2 points for OT or SO win; 1 point for OT or SO loss; 0 points for regulation loss

=== Relegation round ===
Pos	Team	Pld	W	OTW	OTL	L	GF	GA	GD	Pts	Qualification or relegation
1	ESC Moskitos Essen (OL)	14	14	0	0	0	139	41	+98	42	Oberliga
2	Ratinger Ice Aliens (OL)	14	10	1	0	3	100	41	+59	32	Oberliga
3	EHC Neuwied (RL)	14	8	0	2	4	70	65	+5	26	Oberliga
4	Grefrather EG (OL)	14	5	2	1	6	70	63	+7	20	Oberliga
5	EJ Kassel Huskies U23 (RL)	14	6	0	1	7	51	72	−21	19	Oberliga
6	Neusser EV (OL)	14	2	3	1	8	53	99	−46	13	Oberliga
7	Löwen Frankfurt U23 (RL)	14	3	1	0	10	43	94	−51	11	Regionalliga
8	Kölner Haie U23 (RL)	14	1	0	2	11	41	92	−51	5	Regionalliga

Source: www.eliteprospects.com
Rules for classification:
Tie-break: 1) points; 2) goal difference; 3) number of goals scored
Points: 3 points for regulation win; 2 points for OT or SO win; 1 point for OT or SO loss; 0 points for regulation loss

== DEL2 promotion playoffs ==
The promotion play-offs for the DEL2 were played over two phases. Phase one consisted of twin play-off tournaments. One tournament for Oberliga North, East and West combined and one tournament for Oberliga South. Each of the two play-off tournaments would see two teams qualify for phase two. Phase two consisted of a 10 match, six team round-robin tournament. Joining the four qualified Oberliga teams was the two lowest ranked DEL2 teams from the 2013/14 DEL2 regular season. The top four teams at the end of the tournament would qualify for promotion to DEL2 with the bottom two qualifying for Oberliga.

=== Oberliga North, east, west playoffs ===
The six west qualifiers, four north and two east split up into two groups. The two groups played a ten match round-robin tournament with the winners progressing to qualification phase two.

Group A

Pos	Team	Pld	W	OTW	OTL	L	GF	GA	GD	Pts	Qualification	LF	IL	LH	KJ	HI	TS
1	Löwen Frankfurt	10	10	0	0	0	91	9	+82	30	DEL2 promotion qualification phase two	—	7–2	11–0	14–0	9–1	9–0
2	Icefighters Leipzig	10	7	0	0	3	63	47	+16	21		3–12	—	7–4	7–2	8–4	13–1
3	Lippe-Hockey-Hamm	10	4	1	1	4	41	58	−17	15		2–10	3–2	—	7–3	3–5	5–4
4	Königsborner JEC	10	3	1	0	6	43	60	−17	11		0–7	5–6	5–4	—	7–2	10–3
5	Hannover Indians	10	3	0	1	6	35	58	−23	10		1–6	5–8	5–6	3–6	—	3–1
6	EHC Timmendorfer Strand 06	10	1	0	0	9	30	71	−41	3		0–6	4–7	6–7	7–5	4–6	—

Source: www.pointstreak.com
Rules for classification:
Tie-break: 1) points; 2) goal difference; 3) number of goals scored
Points: 3 points for regulation win; 2 points for OT or SO win; 1 point for OT or SO loss; 0 points for regulation loss

Group B

Pos	Team	Pld	W	OTW	OTL	L	GF	GA	GD	Pts	Qualification	KH	FD	HS	HE	RP	ED
1	EC Kassel Huskies	10	8	0	1	1	76	23	+53	25	DEL2 promotion qualification phase two	—	1–2	5–2	13–1	17–4	14–4
2	Füchse Duisburg	10	7	2	0	1	41	18	+23	25		2–5	—	4–3	3–1	4–1	10–1
3	Hannover Scorpions	10	4	0	2	4	37	40	−3	14		0–6	2–3	—	4–5	9–1	4–3
4	Herner EV 2007	10	3	0	0	7	37	52	−15	9		4–2	2–3	2–4	—	2–4	6–7
5	Rostock Piranhas	10	2	1	1	6	34	62	−28	9		2–7	1–5	2–5	6–10	—	8–3
6	EHC Erfurt Black Dragons	10	2	1	0	7	36	66	−30	8		2–6	1–5	9–4	6–4	0–5	—

Source: www.pointstreak.com
Rules for classification:
Tie-break: 1) points; 2) goal difference; 3) number of goals scored
Points: 3 points for regulation win; 2 points for OT or SO win; 1 point for OT or SO loss; 0 points for regulation loss

=== Oberliga South playoffs ===
The eight teams that progressed from the Oberliga South regular season split into two brackets of four teams each. In a best of seven series knock-out format, the winners of each bracket progressed to phase two qualification.

Semi-finals
1	VER Selb	4
8	Erding Gladiators	0
4	EHC Bayreuth	4
5	EHC Klostersee	2
2	EHC Freiburg	4
7	EV Füssen	2
3	Tölzer Löwen	4
6	EC Peiting	3

Finals
F1	VER Selb	3
F2	EHC Bayreuth	0
F1	EHC Freiburg	3
F2	Tölzer Löwen	1

Format: Best of seven match series'
Source: www.pointstreak.com

=== DEL2 qualification playoffs ===
For 2014/15, DEL2 was expanding the league size by two teams to fourteen total teams. The league needed an additional two Oberliga teams to be promoted. Joining the Kassel Huskies, Löwen Frankfurt, EHC Freiburg and VER Selb for the qualification tournament was DEL2 teams, Eispiraten Crimmitschau and ESV Kaufbeuren. The six teams played a ten match round-robin format. The top four teams would qualify for the 2014/15 DEL2 season. The bottom two teams would qualify for the 2014/15 Oberliga season. The playoffs ran from 23 March till 21 April 2014. The playoffs resulted in Crimmitschau and Kaufbeuren retaining their DEL2 status. Kassel and Frankfurt were promoted. Freiburg and Selb retained their Oberliga status.

Pos	Team	Pld	W	OTW	OTL	L	GF	GA	GD	Pts	Qualification	EC	KH	LF	EK	EF	VS
1	Eispiraten Crimmitschau (DEL2)	10	7	0	0	3	45	30	+15	21	DEL2	—	8–1	2–4	6–5	5–3	2–0
2	EC Kassel Huskies (OL) (P)	10	5	1	2	2	33	30	+3	19	DEL2	1–6	—	3–2	3–2	6–1	7–2
3	Löwen Frankfurt (OL) (P)	10	5	1	1	3	31	21	+10	18	DEL2	3–6	2–1	—	5–2	2–1	6–0
4	ESV Kaufbeuren (DEL2)	10	5	1	0	4	33	29	+4	17	DEL2	5–3	2–1	1–0	—	4–5	4–2
5	EHC Freiburg (OL)	10	5	0	0	5	36	35	+1	15	Oberliga	5–2	2–4	4–2	2–4	—	8–5
6	VER Selb (OL)	10	0	0	0	10	19	52	−33	0	Oberliga	3–5	3–6	1–5	2–4	1–5	—

Source: www.pointstreak.com
Rules for classification:
Tie-break: 1) points; 2) goal difference; 3) number of goals scored
Points: 3 points for regulation win; 2 points for OT or SO win; 1 point for OT or SO loss; 0 points for regulation loss
(P) Promoted
