= Blue Devils Weiden =

- City: Weiden in der Oberpfalz, Germany
- League: DEL2
- Founded: 1985
- Home arena: Hans-Schröpf-Arena
- Colors: Navy, red, blue, white

Franchise history
- 1985–2000: EV Weiden
- 2000–present: Blue Devils Weiden

Championships
- Division titles: 2022, 2023, 2024
- Oberliga Championships: 2024

The Blue Devils Weiden are a professional ice hockey team based in Weiden, Bavaria, Germany. The team currently plays in the DEL2, the second-highest level of ice hockey in Germany. The Blue Devils play their home games at the Hans-Schröpf-Arena.

== History ==
Founded in 1985 as 'EV Weiden', the club began play at the lowest level of German professional hockey, the Bavarian ice hockey leagues (Bayernliga). Little information is available for the team's early years, however, by the early-1990s, the club had made its way into the Oberliga, the third-level in Germany. The club continued its ascent with solid play for a few years before jumping up to the 2nd Bundesliga (2nd-tier) in 1994. Unfortunately, Weiden was not able to continue its winning ways in the second league and had been relegated back to the Oberliga by the end of the 90s.

In 2000 the club was sold, renamed as the Blue Devils, and started their second life in the Regionalliga (fourth-league). Within 3 years they earned a promotion back to the Bundesliga but their second stint there didn't last long. The Blue Devils were relegated in 2005 and then spent three more years in the Oberliga before being sold once more. Weiden returned to the Bayernliga in 2008 but was able to climb their way back to the Oberliga by 2012. While the club was supposed to have been relegated in 2014, they managed to remain in the third league due to the withdrawal of ERV Schweinfurt. After saving themselves from relegation the following year, Weiden was able stabilize as a middling playoff team.

After coming out of the COVID-19 pandemic, Weiden saw a drastic change in its fortune. In 2022, the club set a new franchise record with 29 wins. While they flamed out in the postseason, the Blue Devils won 39 games the following year and ended as the league runners-up. 2024 saw the team win 43 of their 48 scheduled games and cap off the year with a league championship. The title sent Weiden back to the second league (since renamed DEL2) for the first time in almost 20 years.

== Season-by-season results ==
Since 2012

Season	GP	W	OTW	OTL	L	Pts	GF	GA	Finish	Playoffs
Oberliga
2012–13	40	15	0	5	20	50	117	151	t-8th of 11, Oberliga South	Won South Qualification series, 4–2 (EC Peiting); Lost Quarterfinal series, 0–3 (Kassel Huskies)
2013–14	44	9	5	4	26	26	129	198	11th of 12, Oberliga South	Lost Relegation Semifinal series, 1–3 (Deggendorf Fire); Lost Relegation Final series, 1–3 (Eisbären Regensburg)
2014–15	44	8	2	3	31	31	109	201	12th of 12, Oberliga South	Lost Relegation Semifinal series, 1–3 (ERC Sonthofen Bulls); Won Relegation Final series, 3–0 (EV Füssen)
2015–16	40	13	2	5	20	48	130	160	8th of 11, Oberliga South	Won South Qualification Semifinal series, 2–1 (ERC Sonthofen Bulls); Lost South Qualification Final series, 1–3 (Eisbären Regensburg)
2016–17	46	15	5	4	22	59	169	182	7th of 12, Oberliga South	Lost South Qualification series, 1–3 (Selber Wölfe)
2017–18	46	15	4	4	23	57	169	201	8th of 12, Oberliga South	Lost Eighthfinal series, 0–3 (Tilburg Trappers)
2018–19	50	15	7	3	25	62	165	196	7th of 12, Oberliga South	Lost Eighthfinal series, 0–3 (Hannover Scorpions)
2019–20	32	10	2	3	15	41	105	132	10th of 12, Oberliga South	postseason cancelled
2020–21	34	11	5	0	18	43	122	128	10th of 13, Oberliga South	Lost Qualifier, 0–5 (EC Peiting)
2021–22	41	29	5	3	4	100	193	96	1st of 12, Oberliga South	Lost Eighthfinal series, 2–3 (Black Dragons Erfurt)
2022–23	48	39	4	2	3	127	253	88	1st of 13, Oberliga South	Won Eighthfinal series, 3–0 (Füchse Duisburg); Won Quarterfinal series, 3–0 (Hannover Scorpions); Won Semifinal series, 3–1 (Saale Bulls Halle); Lost Championship series, 1–3 (Starbulls Rosenheim)
2023–24	48	43	1	1	3	132	291	114	1st of 13, Oberliga South	Won Eighthfinal series, 3–0 (Herner EV 2007); Won Quarterfinal series, 4–0 (EC Peiting); Won Semifinal series, 4–1 (Tilburg Trappers); Won Championship series, 4–2 (Hannover Scorpions)
DEL2
2024–25	52	22	3	5	22	77	158	166	7th of 14, DEL2	Won Eighthfinal series, 2–1 (EC Bad Nauheim); Lost Quarterfinal series, 2–4 (Krefeld Pinguine)
