= 2019–20 Oberliga (ice hockey) season =

2019–20 Oberliga season
- League: Oberliga
- Sport: Ice Hockey
- Duration: 28 September 2019 – 11 March 2020
- Number of teams: 24
- TV partner(s): Sprade TV (select teams)

Regular season
- Season champions: Tilburg Trappers (North); Eisbären Regensburg (South)
- Top scorer: Brad Snetsinger (North); Ian McDonald (South)
- Promoted to DEL2: N/A (no promotion playoffs due to COVID-19)
- Relegated to Regionalliga: ERC Sonthofen Bulls (bankruptcy)

Playoffs
- Champions: No champion (Championship playoffs not contested)

Oberliga seasons
- ← 2018–19 2020–21 →

The 2019/20 Oberliga season was the 61st season of the Oberliga, the third-tier of German ice hockey. The Oberliga operated with two regional leagues, North and South. 24 teams competed in the season that spanned from 28 September 2019 till 11 March 2020. The regular season and championship playoff qualifiers was completed, but the season was then cut short due to the COVID-19 pandemic and the remainder of the Oberliga season was cancelled by DEB. The championship playoffs were not contested so no Oberliga champion was named. There was also no sporting promotion or relegation, with ERC Sonthofen the only team to be relegated due to the club entering insolvency. Tilburg Trappers were crowned Oberliga North premiers, while Eisbären Regensburg were crowned Oberliga South premiers.

== Teams ==
2019/20 German teams in Oberliga
2019/20 Dutch teams in Oberliga

Oberliga North Teams: 2019–20 Season
Team	Location		Arena	Capacity	Founded	Joined league
Team	City	State	Arena	Capacity	Founded	Joined league
Füchse Duisburg	Duisburg	North Rhine-Westphalia	Scania Arena	4,800	1971	2010
Black Dragons Erfurt	Erfurt	Thuringia	Kartoffelhalle Erfurt	1,200	2010	2010
Moskitos Essen	Essen	North Rhine-Westphalia	Eissporthalle Essen-West	3,850	1994	2015
Saale Bulls Halle	Halle (Saale)	Saxony-Anhalt	Eissporthalle Halle	2,200	2004	2010
Hamburg Crocodiles	Hamburg	Hamburg	Eisland Farmsen	2,300	1990	2010
Hannover Indians	Hannover	Lower Saxony	Eisstadion am Pferdeturm	4,608	1948	2013
Hannover Scorpions	Hannover	Lower Saxony	Eishalle Langenhagen	3,800	1996	2013
Herner EV 2007	Herne	North Rhine-Westphalia	Gysenberghalle	3,700	2007	2012
Krefeld Pinguine U23	Krefeld	North Rhine-Westphalia	König Palast	9,000	1995	2011
IceFighters Leipzig	Leipzig	Saxony	Kohlrabizirkus Eisarena	2,500	2010	2010
Rostock Piranhas	Rostock	Mecklenburg-Vorpommern	Eishalle Rostock	2,000	1990	2010
Tilburg Trappers	Tilburg	North Brabant	IJssportcentrum Tilburg	2,500	1938	2015

Three Regionalliga teams declined promotion to Oberliga North (ECW Sande, Herford EV and Schönheider Wolves). DEL team, Krefeld EV applied for a licence for their U23 team to compete in Oberliga North, this was accepted. EC Harzer Falken withdrew from the league after beginning insolvency proceedings. ECC Preussen Berlin had the chance to apply for a licence, even though they were relegated from the previous season but they could not meet the conditions so remained in Regionlliga Ost.

Oberliga South Teams: 2019–20 Season
Team	Location		Arena	Capacity	Founded	Joined league
Team	City	State	Arena	Capacity	Founded	Joined league
EV Füssen	Füssen	Bavaria	Bundesleistungszentrum	4,700	1922	2019
Höchstadter EC	Höchstadt	Bavaria	Eisstadion Höchstadt	2,000	1993	2018
ECDC Memmingen	Memmingen	Bavaria	Eissportstadion am Hühnerberg	3,850	1992	2017
EV Lindau Islanders	Lindau	Bavaria	Eichwaldstadion	1,100	1976	2016
EC Peiting	Peiting	Bavaria	Eisstadion Peiting	2,500	1973	2000
SC Riessersee	Garmisch-Partenkirchen	Bavaria	Olympia-Eissport-Zentrum	6,926	1920	2018
ERC Sonthofen 1999	Sonthofen	Bavaria	Eissporthalle Sonthofen	2,860	1999	2014
Eisbären Regensburg	Regensburg	Bavaria	Donau Arena	4,961	1962	2010
Starbulls Rosenheim	Rosenheim	Bavaria	Emilo Stadion	4,750	2000	2017
Selber Wölfe	Selb	Bavaria	Hutschenreuther Eissporthalle	4,082	2004	2010
Blue Devils Weiden	Weiden	Bavaria	Eisstadion Weiden	2,560	1985	2012
Deggendorfer SC	Deggendorf	Bavaria	Eissporthalle an der Trat	4,000	2002	2019

Deggendorf SC joined Oberliga South for 2019/20 after being relegated from DEL2. EV Landshut left the league after being promoted to DEL2. EV Füssen joined the league from the Bayernliga while EHC Waldkraiburg went the other direction. The champions of Regionalliga Südwest, SC Bietigheim-Bissingen were not eligible for promotion to Oberliga South due to their first team playing in DEL2 (Bietigheim Steelers)

== Oberliga North ==
Oberliga North ran from 21 September 2019 till 10 March 2020. The league operated with a 44 match (4 matches against each team) regular season. The top six teams automatically qualified for the championship & promotion playoffs. The next four teams advanced to the qualification playoffs for two spots in the championship playoffs. The team finishing eleventh, had their season end after the regular season while the team that finished twelfth, was relegated to the Regionalliga. Tilburg Trappers topped the league standings at the end of the regular season, being crowned Oberliga North premiers. Krefeld EV U23's finished last and would have been relegated until the league decided to suspend all promotion and relegation for the season due to COVID-19 ending the season early.

=== Regular season ===
Pos	Team	Pld	W	OTW	OTL	L	GF	GA	GD	Pts	Qualification or relegation
1	Tilburg Trappers	44	31	6	1	6	209	116	+93	106	Oberliga; Championship playoffs
2	Herner EV 2007	44	31	1	2	10	198	141	+57	97	Oberliga; Championship playoffs
3	Hamburg Crocodiles	44	25	2	5	12	184	122	+62	84	Oberliga; Championship playoffs
4	Hannover Indians	44	21	4	7	12	140	117	+23	78	Oberliga; Championship playoffs
5	Icefighters Leipzig	44	22	3	3	16	168	134	+34	75	Oberliga; Championship playoffs
6	Hannover Scorpions	44	20	5	2	17	174	153	+21	72	Oberliga; Championship playoffs
7	Saale Bulls Halle	44	19	4	3	18	168	154	+14	68	Nord; Qualification playoffs
8	Füchse Duisburg	44	17	3	3	21	151	161	−10	60	Nord; Qualification playoffs
9	Rostock Piranhas	44	13	4	6	21	133	167	−34	53	Nord; Qualification playoffs
10	ESC Moskitos Essen	44	10	3	4	27	137	202	−65	40	Nord; Qualification playoffs
11	Erfurt Black Dragons	44	9	3	2	30	117	189	−72	35	
12	Krefelder EV U23	44	7	1	1	35	119	242	−123	24	Regionalliga

Source: www.eliteprospects.com
Rules for classification:
Tie-break: 1) points; 2) goal difference; 3) number of goals scored
Points: 3 points for regulation win; 2 points for OT or SO win; 1 point for OT or SO loss; 0 points for regulation loss

=== Qualification playoffs ===
Teams finishing seventh to tenth play best of three match series in the qualification playoffs to determine the final two places from Oberliga North in the Championship playoffs. The matches occurred between 6 March and 10 March 2020.

Qualified for Championship playoffs

Team 1	Team 2	Series result	Match 1	Match 2	Match 3
Saale Bulls Halle	ESC Moskitos Essen	2:0	7–2	5–4	–
Füchse Duisburg	Rostock Piranhas	1:2	3–2	3–4	2–3 (OT)

== Oberliga South ==
Oberliga South ran from 27 September 2019 till 8 March 2020. The league was broken into two stages. Stage one, the regular season, had all twelve teams compete in a home and away round before splitting into two regional groups for a second home and away round for a total of 32 matches. The top ten teams advanced to the Oberliga South qualification round to determine the league premier and eight qualifiers for the Oberliga championship playoffs. The bottom two teams advanced to the relegation playoffs with six Bayernliga teams. Memmingen Indians finished top of the regular season but Eisbären Regensburg topped the fifty match qualification round to claim the Oberliga South premiership. ERC Sonthofen Bulls and Höchstadter EC finished in the bottom two, but the relegation playoffs were cancelled due to COVID-19, so neither team was relegated on sporting performance. However, ERC Sonthofen declared bankruptcy and withdrew from the league, confirming their relegation next season.

=== Regular season ===
Group A
#	Team
1	EV Füssen
2	ECDC Memmingen
3	EV Lindau Islanders
4	EC Peiting
5	SC Riessersee
6	ERC Sonthofen Bulls

Group B
#	Team
1	Eisbären Regensburg
2	Starbulls Rosenheim
3	Selber Wölfe
4	Höchstadter EC
5	1. EV Weiden
6	Deggendorfer SC

Pos	Team	Pld	W	OTW	OTL	L	GF	GA	GD	Pts	Qualification or relegation
1	ECDC Memmingen	32	16	8	2	6	127	89	+38	66	Süd; Qualification round
2	Deggendorfer SC	32	16	5	2	9	154	114	+40	60	Süd; Qualification round
3	Starbulls Rosenheim	32	17	2	5	8	134	100	+34	60	Süd; Qualification round
4	Eisbären Regensburg	32	15	2	5	10	141	113	+28	54	Süd; Qualification round
5	EV Füssen	32	16	0	6	10	98	100	−2	54	Süd; Qualification round
6	SC Riessersee	32	10	7	7	8	121	101	+20	51	Süd; Qualification round
7	EC Peiting	32	12	5	5	10	112	98	+14	51	Süd; Qualification round
8	EV Lindau Islanders	32	13	1	4	14	100	130	−30	45	Süd; Qualification round
9	Selber Wölfe	32	10	6	0	16	117	122	−5	42	Süd; Qualification round
10	1. EV Weiden	32	10	4	3	15	105	132	−27	41	Süd; Qualification round
11	ERC Sonthofen Bulls	32	11	2	3	16	117	131	−14	40	Regionalliga relegation playoffs
12	Höchstadter EC	32	3	1	1	27	67	163	−96	12	Regionalliga relegation playoffs

Source: www.eliteprospects.com
Rules for classification:
Tie-break: 1) points; 2) goal difference; 3) number of goals scored
Points: 3 points for regulation win; 2 points for OT or SO win; 1 point for OT or SO loss; 0 points for regulation loss

=== Qualification round ===
Pos	Team	Pld	W	OTW	OTL	L	GF	GA	GD	Pts	Qualification or relegation
1	Eisbären Regensburg	50	29	2	5	14	216	155	+61	96	Oberliga; Championship playoffs
2	ECDC Memmingen	50	23	11	4	12	186	144	+42	95	Oberliga; Championship playoffs
3	SC Riessersee	50	22	9	8	11	196	138	+58	92	Oberliga; Championship playoffs
4	Deggendorfer SC	50	24	8	3	15	226	184	+42	91	Oberliga; Championship playoffs
5	Starbulls Rosenheim	50	25	3	5	17	200	156	+44	86	Oberliga; Championship playoffs
6	EC Peiting	50	20	5	9	16	174	163	+11	79	Oberliga; Championship playoffs
7	EV Füssen	50	23	0	8	19	168	176	−8	77	Oberliga; Championship playoffs
8	Selber Wölfe	50	15	9	3	23	177	186	−9	66	Oberliga; Championship playoffs
9	1. EV Weiden	50	13	6	7	24	164	218	−54	58	
10	EV Lindau Islanders	50	14	4	4	28	142	219	−77	54	

Source: www.gamepitch.de
Rules for classification:
Tie-break: 1) points; 2) goal difference; 3) number of goals scored
Points: 3 points for regulation win; 2 points for OT or SO win; 1 point for OT or SO loss; 0 points for regulation loss

== Championship playoffs ==
The championship playoffs to determine the Oberliga champion and promotion to DEL2 did not go ahead for the 2019/20 season. All ice hockey in Germany was cancelled on 11 March 2020 due to the COVID-19 pandemic.

Qualified teams

North
#	Team
1	Eisbären Regensburg
2	ECDC Memmingen
3	SC Riessersee
4	Deggendorfer SC
5	Starbulls Rosenheim
6	EC Peiting
7	EV Füssen
8	Selber Wölfe

South
#	Team
1	Tilburg Trappers
2	Herner EV 2007
3	Hamburg Crocodiles
4	Hannover Indians
5	Icefighters Leipzig
6	Hannover Scorpions
7	Saale Bulls Halle
8	Rostock Piranhas
