= 2018–19 Oberliga (ice hockey) season =

2018–19 Oberliga season
- League: Oberliga
- Sport: Ice Hockey
- Duration: 21 September 2018 – 30 April 2019
- Teams: 25
- TV partner: Sprade TV (select teams)

Regular season
- Season champions: (North Brabant) Tilburg Trappers (North) (Bavaria) EC Peiting (South)
- Top scorer: (Germany) Björn Bombis (North) (Canada) Ian McDonald (South)
- Promoted to DEL2: EV Landshut
- Relegated to Regionalliga: EHC Waldkraiburg; EC Harzer Falken; ECC Preussen Berlin

Championship playoffs
- Champions: (Bavaria) EV Landshut
- Runners-up: Tilburg Trappers

Oberliga seasons
- ← 2017–18 2019–20 →

The 2018–19 Oberliga season was the 60th season of the Oberliga, the third tier of German ice hockey. The Oberliga operated with two regional leagues, North and South. 25 teams competed in the season that lasted from 21 September 2018 till 30 April 2019. The Tilburg Trappers and EC Peiting won the North and South premierships respectively. EV Landshut was crowned Oberliga champion for winning the playoffs, and by doing so they also secured promotion to DEL2. EHC Waldkraiburg, EC Harzer Falken, and ECC Preussen Berlin were all relegated to the Regionalliga.

== Teams ==
2018/19 German teams in Oberliga
2018/19 Dutch teams in Oberliga

Oberliga North Teams: 2018–19 Season
Team	Location		Arena	Capacity	Founded	Joined league
Team	City	State	Arena	Capacity	Founded	Joined league
Füchse Duisburg	Duisburg	North Rhine-Westphalia	Scania Arena	4,800	1971	2010
Black Dragons Erfurt	Erfurt	Thuringia	Kartoffelhalle Erfurt	1,200	2010	2010
Moskitos Essen	Essen	North Rhine-Westphalia	Eissporthalle Essen-West	3,850	1994	2015
Saale Bulls Halle	Halle (Saale)	Saxony-Anhalt	Eissporthalle Halle	2,200	2004	2010
Hamburg Crocodiles	Hamburg	Hamburg	Eisland Farmsen	2,300	1990	2010
Hannover Indians	Hannover	Lower Saxony	Eisstadion am Pferdeturm	4,608	1948	2013
Hannover Scorpions	Hannover	Lower Saxony	Eishalle Langenhagen	3,800	1996	2013
EC Harzer Falken	Braunlage	Lower Saxony	Eisstadion Braunlage	2,548	1984	2013
Herner EV 2007	Herne	North Rhine-Westphalia	Gysenberghalle	3,700	2007	2012
IceFighters Leipzig	Leipzig	Saxony	Kohlrabizirkus Eisarena	2,500	2010	2010
ECC Preussen Berlin	Berlin	Berlin	Eissporthalle Charlottenburg	1,000	2004	2015
Rostock Piranhas	Rostock	Mecklenburg-Vorpommern	Eishalle Rostock	2,000	1990	2010
Tilburg Trappers	Tilburg	North Brabant	IJssportcentrum Tilburg	2,500	1938	2015

Oberliga North planned to expand to a sixteen team competition for 2018/19. However, those plans did not eventuate when the champions of Regionalliga North (Weserstars Bremen), East (ELV Tornado Niesky) and West (Herforder EV) all declined promotion to Oberliga North. The runners-up of each league also declined to submit an application for a licence. As such, the relegation of EC Harzer Falken was overturned and the team from Braunlage remained in the league. In August 2018, EHC Timmendorfer Strand 06 withdrew from the league and filed for bankruptcy. Oberliga North started the season with 13 teams.

Oberliga South Teams: 2018–19 Season
Team	Location		Arena	Capacity	Founded	Joined league
Team	City	State	Arena	Capacity	Founded	Joined league
EV Landshut	Landshut	Bavaria	Eisstadion am Gutenbergweg	4,996	1948	2019
Höchstadter EC	Höchstadt	Bavaria	Eisstadion Höchstadt	2,000	1993	2018
ECDC Memmingen	Memmingen	Bavaria	Eissportstadion am Hühnerberg	3,850	1992	2017
EV Lindau Islanders	Lindau	Bavaria	Eichwaldstadion	1,100	1976	2016
EC Peiting	Peiting	Bavaria	Eisstadion Peiting	2,500	1973	2000
SC Riessersee	Garmisch-Partenkirchen	Bavaria	Olympia-Eissport-Zentrum	6,926	1920	2018
ERC Sonthofen 1999	Sonthofen	Bavaria	Eissporthalle Sonthofen	2,860	1999	2014
Eisbären Regensburg	Regensburg	Bavaria	Donau Arena	4,961	1962	2010
Starbulls Rosenheim	Rosenheim	Bavaria	Emilo Stadion	4,750	2000	2017
Selber Wölfe	Selb	Bavaria	Hutschenreuther Eissporthalle	4,082	2004	2010
1. EV Weiden	Weiden	Bavaria	Eisstadion Weiden	2,560	1985	2012
EHC Waldkraiburg	Waldkraiburg	Bavaria	Eissporthalle Waldkraiburg	3,500	1991	2019

Oberliga South planned to expand to a fourteen-team competition for 2018/19. However, those plans were scrapped when the league was unable to find any suitable candidates in the Regionalliga East, South-West, or Bavaria. Deggendorfer SC left the league after being promoted to DEL2. Regionalliga South-West champion, SC Bietigheim-Bissingen U23 was unable to join the league due to the club having their first team in DEL2. TEV Miesbach also left the league after being relegated the previous season. Joining the league was the recently relegated DEL2 team, Bayreuth Tigers. On 16 May 2018, the DEL2 team SC Riessersee also joined the league after having their DEL2 licence cancelled. SC Riessersee had a protracted negotiation with DEL2 but ultimately was unable to agree to rejoin the league. SC Riessersee then agreed to join Oberliga South for 2018/19. Oberliga South admitted the team with strict conditions, including Riessersee not being able to participate in the championship playoffs and being forced to participate in the relegation playoffs regardless of their regular-season performance. Oberliga South started the season with 12 teams.

== Oberliga North ==
Oberliga North ran from 21 September 2018 till 3 March 2019. The league operated with a 48-match (4 matches against each team) regular season. The top six teams automatically qualified for the championship playoffs. The next four teams advanced to the qualification playoffs, playing for two final spots in the championship playoffs. Teams finishing eleventh to thirteenth had their season end after the regular season. The thirteenth team would be relegated to the Regionalliga. After 26 days into the season, the Hamburg Crocodiles opened insolvency procedures, however, they were allowed to continue to compete during the regular season. The Oberliga board decided to impose the same conditions on Hamburg as they did SC Riessersee, the Crocodiles would be excluded from the championship playoffs. If they finished within the qualification positions, the next team below the qualification positions would take their place.

=== Regular season ===
Pos	Team	Pld	W	OTW	OTL	L	GF	GA	GD	Pts	Qualification or relegation
1	Tilburg Trappers	48	35	4	5	4	256	127	+129	118	Oberliga; Championship playoffs
2	Hannover Scorpions	48	32	2	2	12	237	142	+95	102	Oberliga; Championship playoffs
3	Hannover Indians	48	29	5	3	11	188	139	+49	100	Oberliga; Championship playoffs
4	Saale Bulls Halle	48	26	3	4	15	220	145	+75	88	Oberliga; Championship playoffs
5	ESC Moskitos Essen	48	26	3	2	17	198	129	+69	86	Oberliga; Championship playoffs
6	Herner EV 2007	48	23	5	3	17	204	169	+35	82	Oberliga; Championship playoffs
7	Rostock Piranhas	48	21	3	2	22	148	171	−23	71	Nord; Qualification playoffs
8	Icefighters Leipzig	48	22	1	2	23	174	157	+17	70	Nord; Qualification playoffs
9	Hamburg Crocodiles	48	20	4	2	22	184	178	+6	70	
10	Füchse Duisburg	48	18	5	0	25	160	167	−7	64	Nord; Qualification playoffs
11	Erfurt Black Dragons	48	12	3	7	26	137	193	−56	49	Nord; Qualification playoffs
12	EC Harzer Falken	48	4	1	6	37	107	277	−170	20	
13	ECC Preussen Berlin	48	4	1	2	41	103	322	−219	16	Regionalliga

Source: www.hockey-db.de
Rules for classification:
Tie-break: 1) points; 2) goal difference; 3) number of goals scored
Points: 3 points for regulation win; 2 points for OT or SO win; 1 point for OT or SO loss; 0 points for regulation loss

=== Qualification playoffs ===
Teams finishing seventh to tenth play best of three match series in the qualification playoffs to determine the final two places from Oberliga North in the Championship playoffs. Due to Hamburg being excluded and finishing ninth, Erfurt Black Dragons, who finished eleventh, progressed to the qualification playoffs instead. The matches occurred between 5 March and 10 March 2020.

Qualified for Championship playoffs

Team 1	Team 2	Series result	Match 1	Match 2	Match 3
Rostock Piranhas	Erfurt Black Dragons	2:1	6–2	4–5	2–1
Icefighters Leipzig	Füchse Duisburg	1:2	2–1	1–5	3–4 (OT)

== Oberliga South ==
Oberliga South ran from 28 September 2018 till 10 March 2019. The league was broken into two stages. Stage one, the regular season, had all twelve teams compete in a home and away round before splitting into two regional groups for a second home and away round for a total of 32 matches. The top ten teams advanced to the Oberliga South qualification round to determine the league premier and eight qualifiers for the Oberliga championship playoffs. Normally the bottom two teams advanced to the relegation playoffs with eight Bayernliga teams, however, due to SC Riessersee entry conditions to the league, the bottom team and Riessersee would advance to the relegation playoffs.

=== Regular season ===
Group A
#	Team
1	ECDC Memmingen
2	EV Lindau Islanders
3	EC Peiting
4	SC Riessersee
5	Starbulls Rosenheim
6	ERC Sonthofen Bulls

Group B
#	Team
1	Eisbären Regensburg
2	EHC Waldkraiburg
3	Selber Wölfe
4	Höchstadter EC
5	1. EV Weiden
6	EV Landshut

Pos	Team	Pld	W	OTW	OTL	L	GF	GA	GD	Pts	Qualification or relegation
1	EC Peiting	32	21	3	1	7	149	84	+65	70	Süd; Qualification round
2	Eisbären Regensburg	32	22	1	2	7	149	87	+62	70	Süd; Qualification round
3	EV Landshut	32	18	4	4	6	138	81	+57	66	Süd; Qualification round
4	SC Riessersee	32	16	6	3	7	109	79	+30	63	Relegation playoffs
5	Starbulls Rosenheim	32	18	1	6	7	122	88	+34	62	Süd; Qualification round
6	ECDC Memmingen	32	12	4	4	12	97	108	−11	48	Süd; Qualification round
7	1. EV Weiden	32	10	6	3	13	107	123	−16	45	Süd; Qualification round
8	Selber Wölfe	32	10	6	1	15	113	116	−3	43	Süd; Qualification round
9	Höchstadter EC	32	9	3	4	16	93	129	−36	37	Süd; Qualification round
10	EV Lindau Islanders	32	7	4	3	18	71	112	−41	32	Süd; Qualification round
11	ERC Sonthofen Bulls	32	4	4	4	20	97	144	−47	24	Süd; Qualification round
12	EHC Waldkraiburg	32	2	1	8	21	70	164	−94	16	Relegation playoffs

Source: www.hockey-db.de
Rules for classification:
Tie-break: 1) points; 2) goal difference; 3) number of goals scored
Points: 3 points for regulation win; 2 points for OT or SO win; 1 point for OT or SO loss; 0 points for regulation loss

=== Qualification round ===
Pos	Team	Pld	W	OTW	OTL	L	GF	GA	GD	Pts	Qualification or relegation
1	EC Peiting	50	34	5	1	10	228	135	+93	113	Oberliga; Championship playoffs
2	EV Landshut	50	31	5	6	8	220	118	+102	109	Oberliga; Championship playoffs
3	Eisbären Regensburg	50	33	2	4	11	240	137	+103	107	Oberliga; Championship playoffs
4	Starbulls Rosenheim	50	28	2	7	13	197	147	+50	95	Oberliga; Championship playoffs
5	ECDC Memmingen	50	21	5	6	18	154	166	−12	79	Oberliga; Championship playoffs
6	Selber Wölfe	50	20	8	1	21	186	187	−1	77	Oberliga; Championship playoffs
7	1. EV Weiden	50	15	7	3	25	165	196	−31	62	Oberliga; Championship playoffs
8	EV Lindau Islanders	50	11	6	6	27	115	163	−48	51	Oberliga; Championship playoffs
9	Höchstadter EC	50	10	4	4	32	136	221	−85	42	
10	ERC Sonthofen Bulls	50	6	4	6	34	148	255	−107	32	

Source: www.hockey-db.de
Rules for classification:
Tie-break: 1) points; 2) goal difference; 3) number of goals scored
Points: 3 points for regulation win; 2 points for OT or SO win; 1 point for OT or SO loss; 0 points for regulation loss

=== Relegation playoffs ===
Ten teams took part in the relegation playoffs. Eight Regionalliga teams and two Oberliga teams. The top two teams from the eighteen match playoffs would qualify for the Oberliga in 2019/20. The bottom eight would qualify for the 2019/20 Regionalliga. SC Riessersee topped the playoffs to retain its status as an Oberliga team. EHC Waldkraiburg finished ninth and was relegated from Oberliga. EV Füssen secured promotion to Oberliga after finishing second.

Pos	Team	Pld	W	OTW	OTL	L	GF	GA	GD	Pts	Qualification or relegation
1	SC Riessersee (OL)	18	13	2	3	0	85	38	+47	46	Oberliga
2	EV Füssen (RL)	18	11	1	1	5	91	64	+27	36	Oberliga
3	HC Landsberg (RL)	18	9	4	0	5	72	62	+10	35	Regionalliga
4	TEV Miesbach (RL)	18	11	0	0	7	83	56	+27	33	Regionalliga
5	EHC Klostersee (RL)	18	9	0	1	8	74	58	+16	28	Regionalliga
6	EC Bad Kissinger Wölfe (RL)	18	7	1	2	8	72	75	−3	25	Regionalliga
7	EHC Königsbrunn (RL)	18	6	0	1	11	49	84	−35	19	Regionalliga
8	TSV Erding (RL)	18	6	0	0	12	69	90	−21	18	Regionalliga
9	EHC Waldkraiburg (OL)	18	6	0	0	12	58	92	−34	18	Regionalliga
10	TSV Peißenberg (RL)	18	4	0	0	14	52	86	−34	12	Regionalliga

Source: www.hockey-db.de
Rules for classification:
Tie-break: 1) points; 2) goal difference; 3) number of goals scored
Points: 3 points for regulation win; 2 points for OT or SO win; 1 point for OT or SO loss; 0 points for regulation loss

== Championship playoffs ==
The championship playoffs to determine the Oberliga champion and promotion to DEL2. The championship playoffs consisted of eight teams each from North and South who play a best of five series elimination format from the round of 16 to the Oberliga final. EV Landshut won the championship final series 3:2 over Tilburg Trappers to be crowned Oberliga-Meister and secure promotion to DEL2.

Round of 16
S1	EC Peiting	3
N8	Füchse Duisburg	0
N1	Tilburg Trappers	3
S8	EV Lindau Islanders	1
S2	EV Landshut	3
N7	Rostock Piranhas	0
N2	Hannover Scorpions	3
S7	1. EV Weiden	1
S3	Eisbären Regensburg	0
N6	Herner EV 2007	3
N3	Hannover Indians	1
S6	Selber Wölfe	3
S4	Starbulls Rosenheim	3
N5	Moskitos Essen	0
N4	Saale Bulls Halle	3
S5	ECDC Memmingen	0

Quarter finals
S1	EC Peiting	0
N6	Herner EV 2007	3
N1	Tilburg Trappers	3
S6	Selber Wölfe	0
S2	EV Landshut	3
N4	Saale Bulls Halle	1
N2	Hannover Scorpions	3
S4	Starbulls Rosenheim	2

Semi finals
N1	Tilburg Trappers	3
N6	Herner EV 2007	2
S2	EV Landshut	3
N2	Hannover Scorpions	0

Championship final
N1	Tilburg Trappers	2
S2	EV Landshut	3

Oberliga-Meister (Bavaria); EV Landshut	Goaltenders: Patrick Berger, Leon Doubrawa, Maximilian Englbrecht, Philipp Maurer Defenders: Sebastian Alt, Christian Ettwein, Stephan Kronthaler, Marius Nägele, Elia Ostwald, Paul Pfenninger, Mario Zimmermann, Luca Zitterbart Attackers: Leon Abstreiter, Peter Abstreiter, Marco Baßler, Alexander Ehl, Christoph Fischhaber, Maximilian Forster, Maximilian Hofbauer, Miloslav Horava, Ales Jirik, Elias Lindner, Lukas Mühlbauer, Julien Pelletier, Tomas Plihal, Luis Schinko, Marc Schmidpeter, Marco Sedlar, Sebastian Stanik, Vitali Stähle, Luca Trinkberger, David Wrigley Coaching staff: Axel Kammerer (head coach), Ralf Hantschke (General manager)
