= Uli Maurer =

German ice hockey player (born 1985)

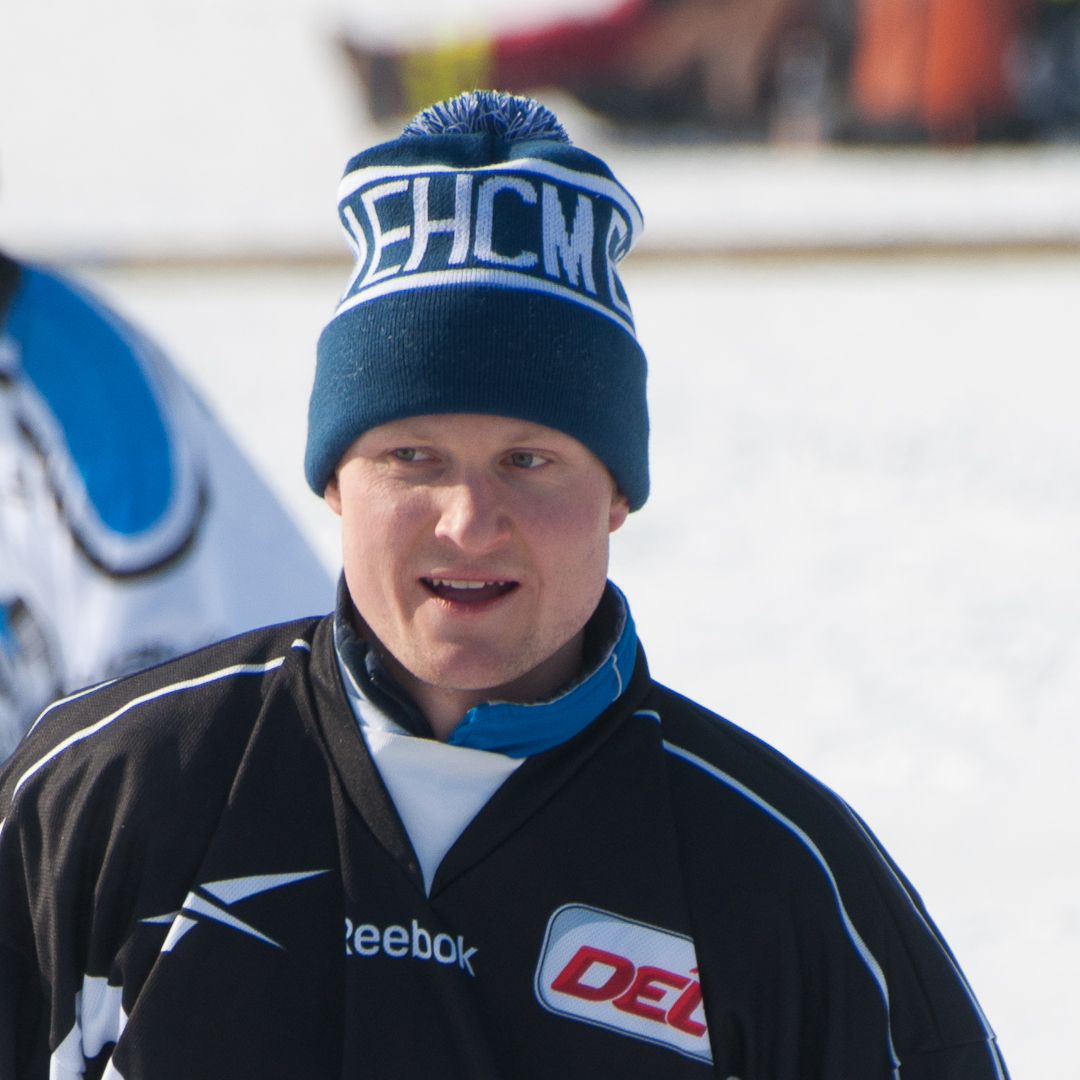
- Born: January 19, 1985 (age 40); Garmisch-Partenkirchen, Germany
- Height: 5 ft 10 in (178 cm)
- Weight: 179 lb (81 kg; 12 st 11 lb)
- Position: Forward
- Shot: Left
- Played for: SC Riessersee; EC Peiting; Nürnberg Ice Tigers; Blue Devils Weiden; Augsburger Panther; EHC München; Schwenninger Wild Wings
- Playing career: 2002–2024

Uli Maurer (born January 19, 1985) is a German professional ice hockey forward who currently plays for SC Riessersee of the Oberliga (Ger.3). He previously played with the Schwenninger Wild Wings on a two-year contract on April 27, 2016, freshly off claiming the German championship in the 2015–16 season with EHC München.

== Career statistics ==
			Regular season					Playoffs
Season	Team	League	GP	G	A	Pts	PIM	GP	G	A	Pts	PIM
2000–01	SC Riessersee U18	DNL	39	15	31	46	26	—	—	—	—	—
2001–02	SC Riessersee U18	DNL	33	37	27	64	70	4	4	2	6	6
2002–03	SC Riessersee	Germany2	40	2	3	5	6	9	2	0	2	4
2002–03	SC Riessersee U18	DNL	11	12	8	20	48	—	—	—	—	—
2003–04	SC Riessersee	Germany2	20	6	5	11	43	—	—	—	—	—
2003–04	EC Peiting	Germany3	13	6	5	11	6	16	7	2	9	22
2004–05	Nürnberg Ice Tigers	DEL	35	0	1	1	4	6	0	0	0	0
2004–05	Blue Devils Weiden	Germany2	1	1	0	1	0	—	—	—	—	—
2005–06	Nürnberg Ice Tigers	DEL	49	2	5	7	16	4	0	1	1	0
2006–07	Nürnberg Ice Tigers	DEL	50	3	7	10	20	13	0	1	1	2
2006–07	SC Riessersee	Germany3	4	2	3	5	18	—	—	—	—	—
2007–08	Nürnberg Ice Tigers	DEL	14	1	4	5	4	1	0	0	0	2
2007–08	SC Riessersee	Germany2	27	10	13	23	30	7	1	1	2	8
2008–09	Augsburger Panther	DEL	45	7	4	11	39	4	0	0	0	2
2008–09	EHC München	Germany2	3	0	1	1	2	—	—	—	—	—
2009–10	Augsburger Panther	DEL	45	3	7	10	32	9	0	1	1	0
2010–11	EHC München	DEL	22	1	1	2	31	2	1	3	4	2
2011–12	EHC München	DEL	46	10	9	19	22	—	—	—	—	—
2012–13	EHC München	DEL	47	11	11	22	53	—	—	—	—	—
2013–14	EHC München	DEL	52	10	12	22	18	1	0	0	0	0
2014–15	EHC München	DEL	34	1	2	3	8	—	—	—	—	—
2015–16	EHC München	DEL	45	2	2	4	8	4	1	1	2	6
2016–17	Schwenninger Wild Wings	DEL	46	5	12	17	14	—	—	—	—	—
2017–18	Schwenninger Wild Wings	DEL	49	2	9	11	28	2	0	0	0	0
2018–19	SC Riessersee	Germany3	13	7	7	14	33	—	—	—	—	—
2019–20	SC Riessersee	Germany3	39	21	28	49	26	—	—	—	—	—
2020–21	SC Riessersee	Germany3	36	16	34	50	38	—	—	—	—	—
2022–23	SC Riessersee	Germany3	29	10	16	26	28	3	2	3	5	0
2023–24	SC Riessersee	Germany3	5	2	0	2	2	—	—	—	—	—
DEL totals			579	58	86	144	297	46	2	7	9	14
