= 2012–13 Oberliga (ice hockey) season =

German ice hockey season

The 2012-13 Oberliga season was the 54th season for the Oberliga, the third-level ice hockey league in Germany. It was divided into four groups (North, South, East, West). Rote Teufel Bad Nauheim won the championship. A total of 39 teams participated.

== Oberliga North ==
=== First round ===
	Team	GP	W	OTW	OTL	L	Pts	GF	GA	Diff.
1.	Rostock Piranhas	24	19	0	1	4	58	169	83	+86
2.	EHC Timmendorfer Strand 06	24	15	2	1	6	50	141	87	+54
3.	Hamburger SV	24	14	3	1	6	49	90	78	+12
4.	Adendorfer EC	24	13	1	0	10	41	110	94	+16
5.	Ritter Nordhorn (N)	24	7	0	4	13	25	90	106	-16
6.	Weserstars Bremen	24	7	0	0	17	21	95	143	-48
7.	Crocodiles Hamburg	24	2	1	0	21	8	58	162	-104

=== Final round ===
	Team	GP	W	OTW	OTL	L	Pts	GF	GA	Diff.
1.	EHC Timmendorfer Strand 06	6	5	0	1	0	16	28	18	+10
2.	Rostock Piranhas	6	2	1	0	3	8	32	27	+5
3.	Hamburger SV	6	1	1	1	3	6	19	28	-9
4.	Adendorfer EC	6	2	0	0	4	6	22	28	-6

=== DEB-Pokal Placement round ===
	Team	GP	W	OTW	OTL	L	Pts	GF	GA	Diff.
5.	Ritter Nordhorn	4	3	0	0	1	9	25	16	+9
6.	Weserstars Bremen	4	2	0	0	2	6	23	20	+3
7.	Crocodiles Hamburg	4	1	0	0	3	3	20	32	-12

== Oberliga East ==
=== First round ===
	Team	GP	W	OTW	OTL	L	Pts	GF	GA	Diff.
2.	Icefighters Leipzig	32	19	1	3	9	62	140	100	+40
3.	FASS Berlin	32	16	4	3	9	59	124	93	+31
4.	EHC Jonsdorfer Falken	32	12	2	6	12	46	131	121	+10
5.	ELV Tornado Niesky	32	11	5	2	14	45	118	140	-22
6.	EHV Schönheide 09	32	10	4	4	14	42	114	126	-12
7.	Black Dragons Erfurt	32	9	3	4	16	37	114	136	-22
8.	Wild Boys Chemnitz	32	9	2	2	19	33	119	173	-54
9.	ECC Preussen Berlin	32	7	2	2	21	27	85	163	-78

=== Relegation round ===
Quarterfinals

- FASS Berlin - EHC Crimmitschau 1b 11:2, 18:0, 13:0
- Jonsdorfer Falken - ECC Preussen Berlin 5:1, 7:5, 10:3
- Tornado Niesky - Wild Boys Chemnitz 6:2, 5:3, 2:1
- EHV Schonheide 09 - Black Dragons Erfurt 4:1, 3:2, 4:5 SO, 1:4, 4:1

Semifinals

- Jonsdorfer Falken - Tornado Niesky 5:6, 4:1, 2:1, 3:6, 10:3
- FASS Berlin - EHC Schonheide 09 2:3 SO, 4:3 OT, 4:2, 3:2 OT

Final

- FASS Berlin - Jonsdorfer Falken 6:5, 5:2, 2:1

== Oberliga West ==
=== First round ===
	Team	GP	W	OTW	OTL	L	Pts	GF	GA	Diff.
1.	Kassel Huskies	22	18	3	0	1	60	210	40	+170
2.	Löwen Frankfurt	22	17	3	2	0	59	236	32	+204
3.	Rote Teufel Bad Nauheim	22	18	1	3	0	59	162	35	+127
4.	Füchse Duisburg	22	13	1	1	7	42	113	59	+54
5.	Krefelder EV	22	9	2	2	9	33	69	108	-39
6.	Hammer Eisbären	22	8	1	2	11	28	96	105	-9
7.	Moskitos Essen	22	9	0	0	13	27	111	125	-14
8.	EHC Dortmund	22	8	0	2	12	26	86	113	-27
9.	Königsborner JEC	22	7	1	1	13	24	81	142	-61
10.	Herforder EV	22	7	1	0	14	23	87	133	-46
11.	Ratinger Ice Aliens	22	4	0	0	18	12	48	212	-146
12.	EHC Neuwied	22	1	0	0	21	3	50	246	-196

=== Final round ===
	Team	GP	W	OTW	OTL	L	Pts	GF	GA	Diff.
1.	Kassel Huskies	14	12	1	1	0	39	101	29	+72
2.	Löwen Frankfurt	14	11	1	2	0	37	97	27	+70
3.	Rote Teufel Bad Nauheim	14	7	3	0	4	27	63	46	+17
4.	Füchse Duisburg	14	6	1	1	6	21	46	45	+1
5.	Moskitos Essen	14	4	0	0	10	12	50	79	-29
6.	Hammer Eisbären	14	3	0	2	9	11	46	73	-27
7.	Krefelder EV	14	2	2	1	9	11	37	78	-41
8.	EHC Dortmund	14	3	0	2	9	11	32	95	-63

=== Cup round ===
	Team	GP	W	OTW	OTL	L	Pts	GF	GA	Diff.
1.	Herner EV (RL)	18	16	1	0	1	50	121	40	+81
2.	Herforder EV (OL)	18	14	0	1	3	43	138	64	+74
3.	Königsborner JEC (OL)	18	12	1	2	3	40	114	71	+43
4.	Grefrath Phoenix (RL)	18	12	0	0	6	36	97	65	+32
5.	Ratinger Ice Aliens (OL)	18	9	1	0	8	29	107	110	-3
6.	Neusser EV (RL)	18	7	1	1	9	24	92	119	-27
7.	Dinslaken Kobras (RL)	18	6	2	0	10	22	58	82	-24
8.	EHC Neuwied (OL)	18	4	0	0	14	12	64	101	-37
9.	EHC Netphen ’08 (RL)	18	3	0	1	14	10	67	119	-52
10.	EJ Kassel 1b (RL)	18	1	0	1	16	4	47	134	-87

== Northern Groups final round ==
=== Teams ===
Group A		Group B	
West	Kassel Huskies	West	Löwen Frankfurt
West	Füchse Duisburg	West	Rote Teufel Bad Nauheim
North	EHC Timmendorfer Strand 06	North	Rostock Piranhas
East	Icefighters Leipzig	East	Saale Bulls Halle

=== Results ===
Group A

	Team	GP	W	OTW	OTL	L	Pts	GF	GA	Diff.
1.	Kassel Huskies	6	5	0	0	1	15	46	11	+35
2.	Füchse Duisburg	6	4	0	0	2	12	30	14	+16
3.	Icefighters Leipzig	6	2	1	0	3	8	24	30	-6
4.	EHC Timmendorfer Strand 06	6	0	0	1	5	1	8	53	-45

Group B

	Team	GP	W	OTW	OTL	L	Pts	GF	GA	Diff.
1.	Rote Teufel Bad Nauheim	6	5	0	0	1	15	27	8	+19
2.	Löwen Frankfurt	6	4	1	0	1	14	40	9	+31
3.	Saale Bulls Halle	6	2	0	1	3	7	19	27	-8
4.	Rostock Piranhas	6	0	0	0	6	0	14	56	-42

== Oberliga South ==
	Team	GP	W	OTW	OTL	L	Pts	GF	GA	Diff.
1.	EC Peiting	40	27	0	0	13	81	168	98	+70
2.	Selber Wölfe	40	22	4	2	12	76	145	110	+35
3.	Tölzer Löwen	40	23	2	2	13	75	141	105	+36
4.	EV Regensburg	40	21	4	3	12	71	161	136	+25
5.	EHC Klostersee	40	18	3	2	17	62	156	123	+33
6.	EHC Freiburg	40	16	4	4	16	60	128	141	-13
7.	EV Füssen	40	15	2	2	21	51	157	178	-21
8.	Blue Devils Weiden	40	15	0	5	20	50	117	151	-34
9.	Deggendorf Fire	40	11	7	3	19	50	140	175	-35
10.	Schweinfurt Mighty Dogs	40	10	4	4	21	42	105	141	-36
11.	Erding Gladiators	40	8	3	6	22	36	138	198	-60

=== Qualification-Playoffs ===
- EC Peiting - Blue Devils Weiden 2:1, 5:6, 5:6 OT, 6:1, 3:5, 3:4 OT
- Seiber Wolfe - EV Fussen 2:0, 3:5, 4:1, 3:0, 11:4
- Tolzer Lowen - EHC Freiburg 2:3, 5:1, 6:0, 3:9, 7:3, 4:5, 7:2
- EV Regensburg - EHC Klostersee 0:1, 3:5, 1:2 OT, 3:8

=== Relegation round ===
	Team	GP	W	OTW	OTL	L	Pts	GF	GA	Diff.
1.	Deggendorf Fire	8	3	1	3	1	14	39	31	+8
2.	Schweinfurt Mighty Dogs	8	3	2	0	3	13	29	31	-2
3.	Erding Gladiators	8	2	1	0	4	9	26	32	-6

== Playoffs ==
=== Quarterfinals ===
- Kassel Huskies - Blue Devils Weiden 6:0, 9:1, 9:4
- Seiber Wolfe - Fuchse Duisburg 1:3, 3:0, 1:2, 5:3, 2:1
- Rote Teufel Bad Nauheim - EHC Klostersee 3:1, 4:3 SO, 6:5 OT
- Tolzer Lowen - Lowen Frankfurt 2:6, 1:7, 3:7

=== Semifinals ===
- Kassel Huskies - Lowen Frankfurt 5:4 OT, 3:4, 4:3 OT, 2:4, 2:1 OT
- Seiber Wolfe - Rote Teufel Bad Nauheim 3:1, 0:5, 0:2, 5:3, 2:4

=== Final ===
- Kassel Huskies - Rote Teufel Bad Nauheim 5:4 OT, 1:4, 3:2 OT, 3:4, 2:3 OT
