= Petr Hrbek =

Czech ice hockey player (born 1969)

- Born: 3 April 1969 (age 57) Prague, Czechoslovakia
- Height: 5 ft 11 in (180 cm)
- Weight: 189 lb (86 kg; 13 st 7 lb)
- Position: Centre
- Shot: Right
- Played for: Extraliga; HC Sparta Praha; HC Dukla Jihlava; HC Litvínov; HC Slavia Praha; HC Havířov Panthers; AHL; Adirondack Red Wings; Deutsche Eishockey Liga; Star Bulls Rosenheim; Chemnitzer RSC
- National team: Czechoslovakia and Czech Republic
- NHL draft: 59th overall, 1988; Detroit Red Wings
- Playing career: 1986–2009

Olympic medal record

Men's Ice hockey
Bronze medal – third place	1992 Albertville	Ice hockey

Petr Hrbek (born 3 April 1969) is a Czech former professional ice hockey player who last played for Chemnitzer RSC in the German Regionalliga.

Hrbek was drafted 59th overall by the Detroit Red Wings in the 1988 NHL entry draft, but only played 37 games in the American Hockey League's Adirondack Red Wings. He played on 1992 Bronze Medal-winning Olympic Hockey team for Czechoslovakia.

== Career statistics ==
=== Regular season and playoffs ===
			Regular season					Playoffs
Season	Team	League	GP	G	A	Pts	PIM	GP	G	A	Pts	PIM
1985–86	TJ Sparta ČKD Praha	TCH U20	31	30	17	47	—	—	—	—	—	—
1985–86	TJ Sparta ČKD Praha	TCH	1	0	1	1	0	—	—	—	—	—
1986–87	TJ Sparta ČKD Praha	TCH	9	1	0	1	2	—	—	—	—	—
1987–88	TJ Sparta ČKD Praha	TCH	44	14	7	21	4	—	—	—	—	—
1988–89	TJ Sparta ČKD Praha	TCH	41	10	13	23	2	—	—	—	—	—
1989–90	ASD Dukla Jihlava	TCH	32	12	7	19	—	—	—	—	—	—
1990–91	HC Sparta Praha	TCH	39	20	17	37	14	—	—	—	—	—
1991–92	HC Sparta Praha	TCH	47	33	17	50	—	—	—	—	—	—
1990–91	HC Sparta Praha	TCH	18	17	13	30	0	—	—	—	—	—
1992–93	Adirondack Red Wings	AHL	37	10	12	22	6	—	—	—	—	—
1993–94	HC Sparta Praha	ELH	11	0	0	0	0	6	1	2	3	6
1993–94	Sportbund DJK Rosenheim	1.GBun	30	19	17	36	8	6	3	5	8	6
1994–95	Star Bulls Rosenheim GmbH	DEL	40	27	22	49	12	7	5	4	9	6
1995–96	HC Sparta Praha	ELH	34	6	12	18	10	7	1	2	3	0
1996–97	HC Chemopetrol, a.s.	ELH	50	14	13	27	23	—	—	—	—	—
1997–98	HC Chemopetrol, a.s.	ELH	51	21	26	47	26	3	2	0	2	0
1998–99	HC Chemopetrol, a.s.	ELH	24	4	7	11	8	—	—	—	—	—
1998–99	HC Slavia Praha	ELH	9	2	3	5	24	—	—	—	—	—
1999–2000	HC Slavia Praha	ELH	51	13	17	30	51	—	—	—	—	—
2000–01	HC Slavia Praha	ELH	14	5	4	9	8	—	—	—	—	—
2000–01	HC Sparta Praha	ELH	28	5	7	12	10	13	0	0	0	2
2001–02	Skellefteå AIK	Allsv	14	5	5	10	2	6	2	0	2	2
2001–02	EHC Freiburg	GER.2	30	10	11	21	4	—	—	—	—	—
2002–03	HC Havířov Panthers	ELH	35	9	8	17	8	—	—	—	—	—
2003–04	Blue Lions Leipzig	GER.4	—	—	—	—	—	—	—	—	—	—
2004–05	Rostocker EC	GER.4	6	7	8	15	2	17	15	15	30	8
2005–06	HC Vodní Lvi Benešov	CZE.4	—	—	—	—	—	—	—	—	—	—
2006–07	HC Mělník	CZE.3	11	2	4	6	0	—	—	—	—	—
2007–08	Chemnitzer RSC	GER.5	15	35	27	62	26	—	—	—	—	—
2008–09	ERV Chemnitz 07	GER.4	20	24	17	41	6	—	—	—	—	—
TCH totals			327	107	75	182	—	—	—	—	—	—
ELH totals			211	79	97	176	168	29	4	4	8	8

=== International ===
Year	Team	Event	GP	G	A	Pts	PIM
1986	Czechoslovakia	EJC	—	—	—	—	—
1987	Czechoslovakia	EJC	7	7	6	13	12
1988	Czechoslovakia	WJC	7	4	4	8	8
1989	Czechoslovakia	WJC	7	3	2	5	0
1991	Czechoslovakia	CC	1	0	0	0	0
1992	Czechoslovakia	OG	8	1	4	5	0
1992	Czechoslovakia	WC	8	6	0	6	2
1993	Czech Republic	WC	8	4	1	5	2
1994	Czech Republic	OG	8	2	3	5	6
Junior totals			21	14	12	26	20
Senior totals			33	13	8	21	10
