= Tomáš Plíhal =

Czech ice hockey player (born 1983)

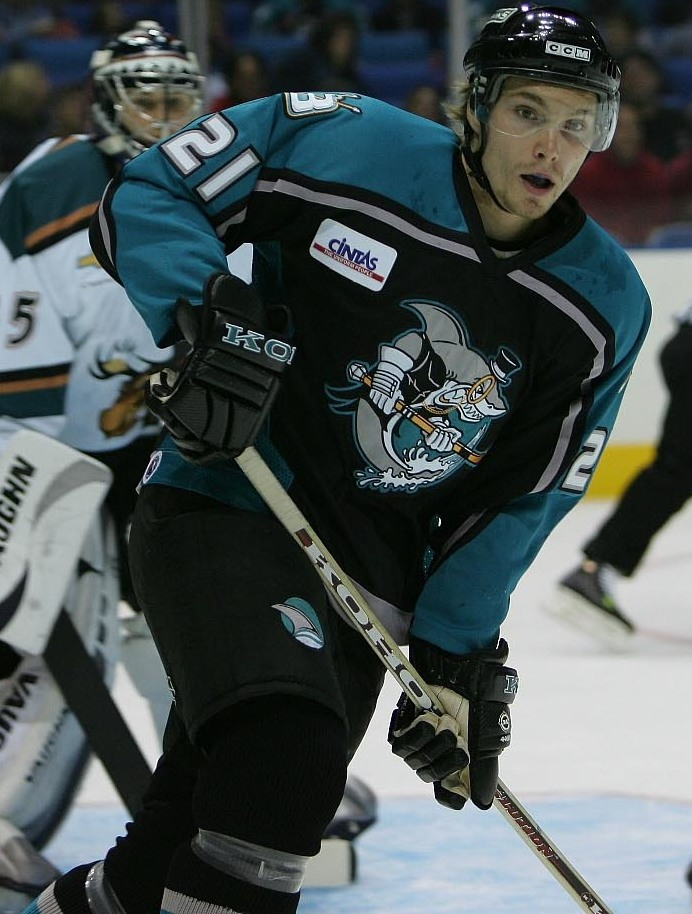
- Plíhal with the Cleveland Barons in 2004
- Born: 28 March 1983 (age 43) Frýdlant, Czechoslovakia
- Height: 6 ft 1 in (185 cm)
- Weight: 200 lb (91 kg; 14 st 4 lb)
- Position: Left wing
- Shot: Left
- Played for: San Jose Sharks; TPS; Oulun Kärpät; Tappara; HC Oceláři Třinec; Orli Znojmo; HC Vlci Jablonec nad Nisou
- NHL draft: 140th overall, 2001; San Jose Sharks
- Playing career: 2007–2022

Tomáš Plíhal (born 28 March 1983) is a Czech former professional ice hockey player who last played for HC Vlci Jablonec nad Nisou of the Czech 2. liga. Plíhal played several seasons in the National Hockey League (NHL) with the San Jose Sharks, who drafted him in the fifth round, 140th overall, in the 2001 NHL entry draft.

== Playing career ==
After being selected by the San Jose Sharks in the 2001 NHL entry draft, Plíhal moved to Canada to play junior hockey with the Kootenay Ice of the Western Hockey League (WHL). Plíhal played two seasons for the Ice from 2001 through 2003. He then turned professional with the Cleveland Barons of the American Hockey League (AHL), where he played three seasons. Plíhal moved with the team to Worcester (becoming the Worcester Sharks) in 2006–07.

Plíhal was called up to San Jose on 25 January 2007 and made his NHL debut on 26 January against the Edmonton Oilers. He was returned to Worcester after three games. Plíhal again rotated between Worcester and San Jose for the 2007–08 season. On 3 March 2008 Plíhal scored his first career assist against the Montreal Canadiens. On 9 March he scored on his first career penalty shot on Niklas Bäckström of the Minnesota Wild. In 2008–09, Plíhal played his final season in the San Jose organization, spending it entirely in the NHL.

In 2009, Plíhal signed as a free agent with TPS of the Finnish SM-liiga. Plíhal played three seasons with Turku. In 2012, he signed with Oulun Kärpät. After playing in Finland for five years, Plíhal returned to his home country, signing with HC Oceláři Třinec in 2014.

== Career statistics ==
=== Regular season and playoffs ===
			Regular season					Playoffs
Season	Team	League	GP	G	A	Pts	PIM	GP	G	A	Pts	PIM
1998–99	HC Liberec	CZE U18	27	23	15	38	—	—	—	—	—	—
1999–00	HC Liberec	CZE U18	18	14	6	20	22	—	—	—	—	—
1999–00	HC Liberec	CZE U20	10	0	2	2	4	—	—	—	—	—
2000–01	Bílí Tygři Liberec	CZE U20	43	25	20	45	52	—	—	—	—	—
2001–02	Kootenay Ice	WHL	72	32	54	86	28	22	4	10	14	14
2002–03	Kootenay Ice	WHL	67	35	42	77	113	11	2	4	6	18
2003–04	Cleveland Barons	AHL	51	4	12	16	16	6	0	3	3	2
2004–05	Cleveland Barons	AHL	62	17	11	28	26	—	—	—	—	—
2004–05	HC VČE Hradec Králové, a.s.	CZE-2	2	0	0	0	2	—	—	—	—	—
2005–06	Cleveland Barons	AHL	74	11	19	30	53	—	—	—	—	—
2006–07	Worcester Sharks	AHL	47	6	9	15	28	—	—	—	—	—
2006–07	San Jose Sharks	NHL	3	0	0	0	0	—	—	—	—	—
2007–08	San Jose Sharks	NHL	22	2	1	3	4	4	0	0	0	0
2007–08	Worcester Sharks	AHL	22	5	7	12	12	—	—	—	—	—
2008–09	San Jose Sharks	NHL	64	5	8	13	22	—	—	—	—	—
2009–10	TPS	SM-liiga	52	19	18	37	73	15	4	4	8	28
2010–11	TPS	SM-liiga	42	11	11	22	53	—	—	—	—	—
2011–12	TPS	SM-liiga	59	16	20	36	66	2	0	2	2	0
2012–13	Kärpät	SM-liiga	41	6	5	11	18	—	—	—	—	—
2013–14	Tappara	Liiga	56	4	4	8	42	11	1	3	4	26
2014–15	HC Oceláři Třinec	ELH	28	11	9	20	28	17	4	4	8	16
2015–16	HC Oceláři Třinec	ELH	48	5	11	16	18	4	0	0	0	4
2016–17	Orli Znojmo	AUT	30	7	9	16	6	4	1	1	2	4
2017–18	Orli Znojmo	AUT	45	3	12	15	28	—	—	—	—	—
2017–18	Heilbronner Falken	GER-2	2	1	0	1	2	7	2	1	3	2
2018–19	HC Vlci Jablonec nad Nisou	CZE-3	25	14	27	41	14	—	—	—	—	—
2018–19	EV Landshut	GER-3	18	6	21	27	4	15	8	13	21	28
2019–20	HC Kobra Praha	CZE-3	12	9	17	26	10	—	—	—	—	—
2019–20	HC Vlci Jablonec nad Nisou	CZE-3	16	8	18	26	18	—	—	—	—	—
2019–20	EV Landshut	GER-3	8	4	5	9	2	—	—	—	—	—
2020–21	HC Vlci Jablonec nad Nisou	CZE-3	3	1	3	4	6	—	—	—	—	—
2021–22	HC Vlci Jablonec nad Nisou	CZE-3	22	14	15	29	22	—	—	—	—	—
2021–22	Eisbären Regensburg	GER-3	8	6	7	13	4	17	10	7	17	2
AHL totals			256	43	58	101	135	6	0	3	3	2
NHL totals			89	7	9	16	26	4	0	0	0	0
Liiga totals			250	56	58	114	252	28	5	9	14	54

=== International ===
Year	Team	Event	GP	G	A	Pts	PIM
2000	Czech Republic	U17	5	1	1	2	—
2001	Czech Republic	WJC18	7	1	1	2	2
Junior totals			12	2	2	4	—
