= Tyler Mosienko =

Canadian ice hockey player

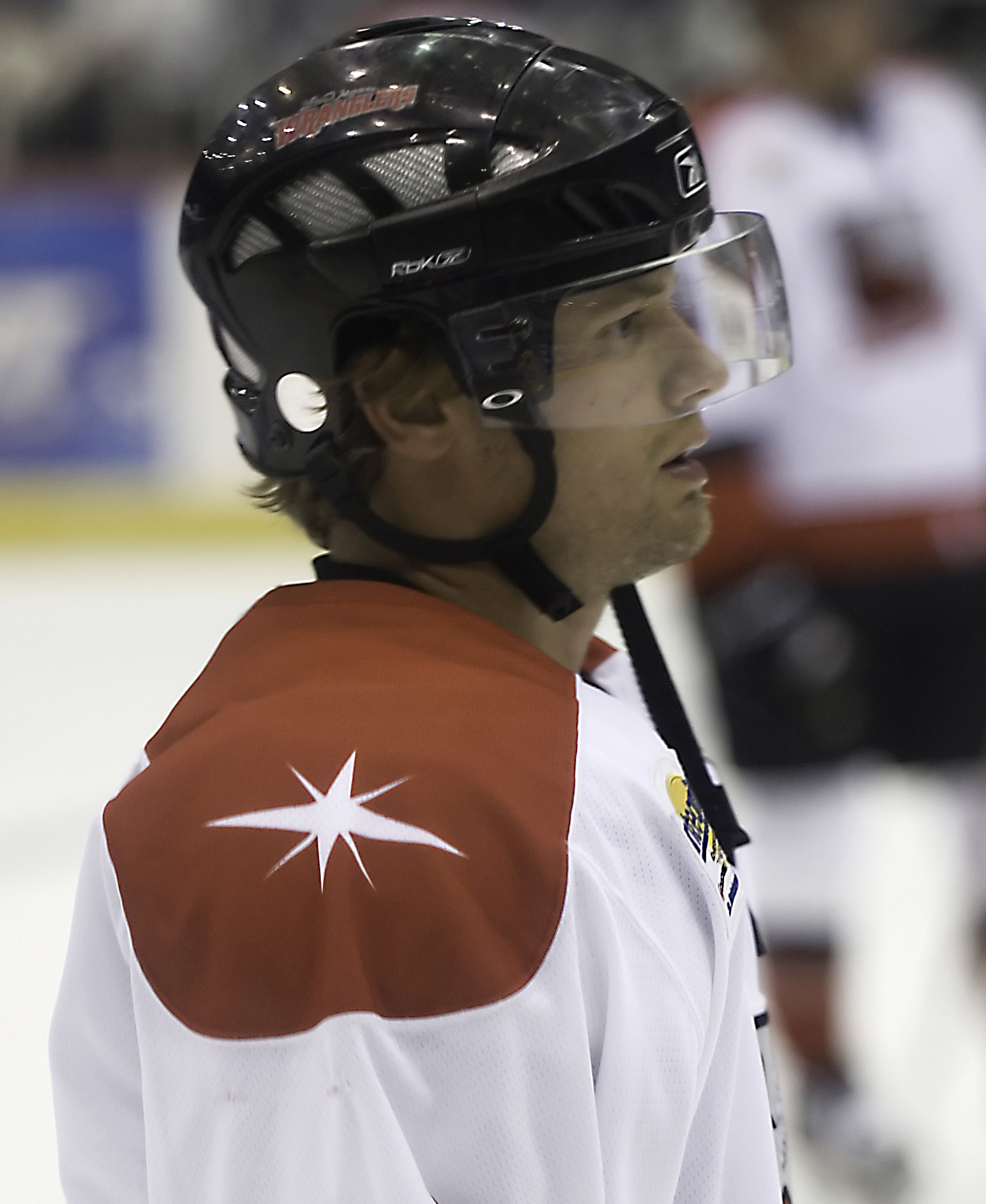
- Mosienko in 2007
- Born: March 21, 1984 (age 41) West St. Paul, Manitoba, Canada
- Height: 5 ft 8 in (173 cm)
- Weight: 172 lb (78 kg; 12 st 4 lb)
- Position: Centre
- Shoots: Left
- team Former teams: Free Agent; Bridgeport Sound Tigers; Manchester Monarchs; Rockford IceHogs; Thomas Sabo Ice Tigers; San Antonio Rampage; Nippon Paper Cranes; Esbjerg Energy; Sheffield Steelers; Frederikshavn White Hawks; Dauphins d'Épinal; Saale Bulls Halle
- NHL draft: Undrafted
- Playing career: 2005–present

Tyler Mosienko (born March 21, 1984) is a Canadian professional ice hockey player who is currently an unrestricted free agent. He most recently played for the Iowa Heartlanders in the ECHL. He is the grandson of Hockey Hall of Famer Bill Mosienko.

== Playing career ==
On July 25, 2014, he joined the Sheffield Steelers of the Elite Ice Hockey League on a one-year contract after helping the Alaska Aces claim their third ECHL Kelly Cup championship. He remained until November 2016 when he left to join the Frederikshavn White Hawks of the Metal Ligaen in Denmark.

After spending time with the Saale Bulls Halle of the Oberliga in Germany, Mosienko decided to return for his 16th professional season after a years hiatus and signed with inaugural ECHL club, Iowa Heartlanders, on October 23, 2021.

== Career statistics ==
			Regular season					Playoffs
Season	Team	League	GP	G	A	Pts	PIM	GP	G	A	Pts	PIM
2000–01	Kelowna Rockets	WHL	60	5	10	15	24	6	0	1	1	2
2001–02	Kelowna Rockets	WHL	70	18	24	42	34	15	0	3	3	10
2002–03	Kelowna Rockets	WHL	64	30	53	83	49	19	11	10	21	2
2003–04	Kelowna Rockets	WHL	72	13	28	41	61	17	4	7	11	8
2004–05	Kelowna Rockets	WHL	72	15	36	51	27	24	5	14	19	20
2005–06	Greenville Grrrowl	ECHL	72	13	34	47	87	6	1	3	4	4
2006–07	Las Vegas Wranglers	ECHL	71	18	34	52	77	10	6	3	9	10
2007–08	Las Vegas Wranglers	ECHL	64	22	37	59	83	21	7	13	20	10
2007–08	Bridgeport Sound Tigers	AHL	7	2	1	3	4	—	—	—	—	—
2008–09	Las Vegas Wranglers	ECHL	50	18	30	48	83	12	3	3	6	19
2008–09	Manchester Monarchs	AHL	9	1	3	4	2	—	—	—	—	—
2008–09	Rockford IceHogs	AHL	15	4	7	11	2	4	1	1	2	2
2009–10	Nürnberg Ice Tigers	DEL	56	5	14	19	12	5	1	1	2	6
2010–11	San Antonio Rampage	AHL	22	1	1	2	4	—	—	—	—	—
2010–11	Las Vegas Wranglers	ECHL	43	15	32	47	78	5	2	1	3	4
2011–12	Nippon Paper Cranes	Asia	36	13	26	39	30	3	0	0	0	4
2012–13	EfB Ishockey	Denmark	39	18	26	44	92	6	1	2	3	8
2013–14	Esbjerg Energy	Denmark	31	16	27	43	28	—	—	—	—	—
2013–14	Alaska Aces	ECHL	25	3	17	20	10	21	1	5	6	4
2014–15	Sheffield Steelers	EIHL	49	21	30	51	38	4	0	3	3	2
2015–16	Sheffield Steelers	EIHL	50	25	31	56	51	2	0	1	1	14
2016–17	Sheffield Steelers	EIHL	6	1	4	5	2	—	—	—	—	—
2016–17	Frederikshavn White Hawks	Denmark	32	3	11	14	18	15	2	3	5	6
2017–18	Gamyo d'Épinal	Ligue Magnus	36	4	17	21	51	6	0	6	6	4
2018–19	Saale Bulls Halle	Germany3	48	24	56	80	38	7	3	4	7	20
2019–20	Saale Bulls Halle	Germany3	15	5	10	15	12	—	—	—	—	—
2021–22	Iowa Heartlanders	ECHL	5	0	3	3	4	—	—	—	—	—
AHL totals			53	8	12	20	12	4	1	1	2	2
ECHL totals			330	89	187	276	422	75	20	28	48	51
