= Tobias Draxinger =

German ice hockey player

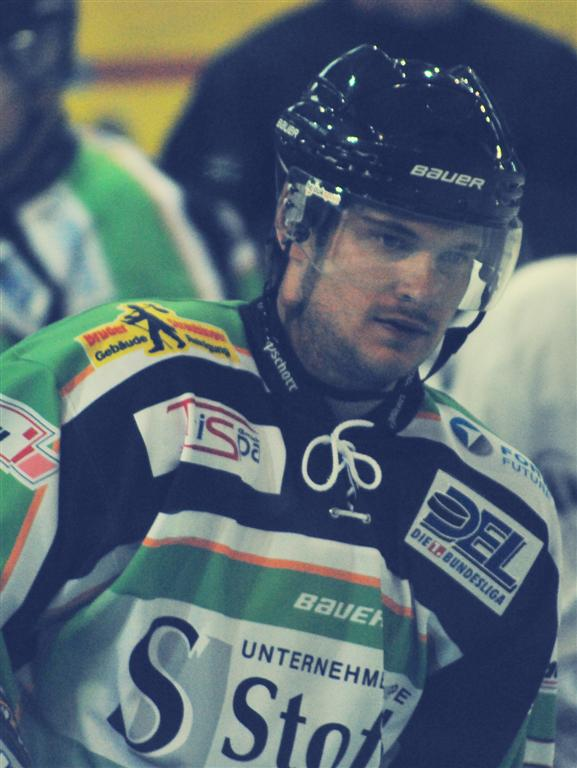
- Born: January 3, 1985 (age 40); Munich, West Germany
- Height: 1.91 m (6 ft 3 in)
- Weight: 99 kg (218 lb; 15 st 8 lb)
- Position: Defence
- Shot: Left
- Played for: Eisbären Berlin; ERC Ingolstadt; Straubing Tigers; Augsburger Panther; EV Landshut
- National team: Germany
- NHL draft: Undrafted
- Playing career: 2003–2022

Tobias Draxinger (born January 3, 1985) is a German professional ice hockey defenceman. He is currently playing for EV Landshut of the DEL2. He previously played for Augsburger Panther in the Deutsche Eishockey Liga (DEL).

== Career statistics ==
			Regular season					Playoffs
Season	Team	League	GP	G	A	Pts	PIM	GP	G	A	Pts	PIM
2000–01	Starbulls Rosenheim U18	DNL	40	2	13	15	16	—	—	—	—	—
2001–02	Starbulls Rosenheim U18	DNL	38	8	20	28	70	2	0	0	0	0
2002–03	Starbulls Rosenheim U18	DNL	24	2	4	6	12	—	—	—	—	—
2002–03	Starbulls Rosenheim	Germany4	21	0	6	6	72	—	—	—	—	—
2003–04	Eisbären Berlin	DEL	38	0	0	0	2	4	0	0	0	0
2003–04	Eisbären Juniors Berlin	Germany4	14	4	0	4	—	5	0	2	2	52
2004–05	Eisbären Berlin	DEL	29	0	1	1	2	5	0	0	0	0
2004–05	Eisbären Juniors Berlin	Germany3	26	5	1	6	41	—	—	—	—	—
2005–06	Eisbären Berlin	DEL	50	0	3	3	20	11	1	0	1	0
2005–06	Eisbären Juniors Berlin	Germany3	6	0	1	1	8	—	—	—	—	—
2006–07	Eisbären Berlin	DEL	41	2	2	4	26	3	0	0	0	0
2006–07	Eisbären Juniors Berlin	Germany3	1	0	0	0	0	—	—	—	—	—
2007–08	Eisbären Berlin	DEL	51	4	6	10	16	14	0	0	0	0
2008–09	ERC Ingolstadt	DEL	52	4	6	10	26	—	—	—	—	—
2009–10	Straubing Tigers	DEL	8	0	1	1	0	—	—	—	—	—
2010–11	Straubing Tigers	DEL	51	5	12	17	40	—	—	—	—	—
2011–12	Augsburger Panther	DEL	52	1	4	5	16	2	0	0	0	0
2012–13	Augsburger Panther	DEL	50	2	8	10	45	2	0	0	0	0
2013–14	Augsburger Panther	DEL	18	0	0	0	6	—	—	—	—	—
2014–15	EV Landshut	DEL2	40	2	11	13	54	9	0	0	0	2
2015–16	EV Landshut	Germany3	31	3	10	13	14	7	1	2	3	8
2016–17	SC Riessersee	DEL2	39	1	6	7	22	—	—	—	—	—
2017–18	Starbulls Rosenheim	Germany3	38	19	14	33	65	8	0	6	6	2
2018–19	Starbulls Rosenheim	Germany3	32	3	10	13	16	8	0	3	3	14
2019–20	Starbulls Rosenheim	Germany3	47	7	16	23	52	—	—	—	—	—
2020–21	Starbulls Rosenheim	Germany3	32	4	11	15	34	—	—	—	—	—
2021–22	Starbulls Rosenheim	Germany3	33	1	8	9	41	7	0	0	0	6
DEL totals			440	18	43	61	199	41	1	0	1	0
