= Martin Mazanec =

Czech ice hockey player

- Born: August 5, 1989 (age 36) České Budějovice, Czechoslovakia
- Height: 6 ft 4 in (193 cm)
- Weight: 207 lb (94 kg; 14 st 11 lb)
- Position: Defence
- Shot: Right
- Oberliga team Former teams: EC Peiting; Piráti Chomutov; Aigles de Nice; MsHK Žilina; Milton Keynes Lightning
- NHL draft: Undrafted
- Playing career: 2008–2023

Martin Mazanec (born August 5, 1989) is a Czech professional ice hockey defenceman. He currently plays with EC Peiting in the Oberliga.

Mazanec made his Czech Extraliga debut playing with Piráti Chomutov debut during the 2013–14 Czech Extraliga season.

== Career statistics ==
			Regular season					Playoffs
Season	Team	League	GP	G	A	Pts	PIM	GP	G	A	Pts	PIM
2004–05	IHC Pisek U18	Czech U18	45	2	11	13	89	—	—	—	—	—
2005–06	HC Slavia Praha U18	Czech U18	45	5	6	11	65	8	1	1	2	6
2005–06	HC Slavia Praha U20	Czech U20	1	0	0	0	0	—	—	—	—	—
2006–07	HC Slavia Praha U20	Czech U20	43	2	2	4	20	1	0	0	0	0
2006–07	IHC Pisek U20	Czech U20 2	8	1	12	13	32	—	—	—	—	—
2007–08	HC Slavia Praha U20	Czech U20	44	4	13	17	94	5	0	2	2	10
2007–08	KLH Chomutov	Czech2	1	0	0	0	0	2	0	0	0	0
2008–09	KLH Chomutov U20	Czech U20	13	0	5	5	50	3	0	1	1	6
2008–09	HC Slavia Praha U20	Czech U20	2	0	2	2	0	—	—	—	—	—
2008–09	KLH Chomutov	Czech2	11	0	2	2	31	—	—	—	—	—
2008–09	SK Kadaň	Czech2	12	0	2	2	51	—	—	—	—	—
2008–09	IHC Pisek	Czech3	5	1	0	1	22	2	0	1	1	4
2008–09	HC Klášterec nad Ohří	Czech3	2	0	1	1	6	—	—	—	—	—
2009–10	KLH Chomutov U20	Czech U20	31	7	14	21	125	1	0	1	1	4
2009–10	KLH Chomutov	Czech2	19	1	3	4	14	—	—	—	—	—
2009–10	HC Děčín	Czech3	1	0	0	0	2	—	—	—	—	—
2010–11	SK Kadan	Czech2	43	3	4	7	110	4	1	2	3	16
2010–11	HC Klášterec nad Ohří	Czech3	2	0	0	0	2	5	0	1	1	35
2011–12	Piráti Chomutov	Czech2	1	0	0	0	0	—	—	—	—	—
2011–12	SK Kadan	Czech2	35	5	6	11	81	—	—	—	—	—
2012–13	SK Kadan	Czech2	51	2	7	9	72	4	0	0	0	12
2013–14	Piráti Chomutov	Czech	14	0	0	0	6	—	—	—	—	—
2013–14	SK Kadan	Czech2	39	3	9	12	52	—	—	—	—	—
2014–15	SK Kadan	Czech2	51	2	11	13	81	4	0	1	1	6
2015–16	HC AZ Havířov 2010	Czech2	46	5	15	20	140	4	1	1	2	16
2016–17	HC Motor České Budějovice	Czech2	31	1	4	5	76	2	0	0	0	29
2017–18	Nice hockey Côte d'Azur	Ligue Magnus	20	1	4	5	61	—	—	—	—	—
2017–18	MsHK Zilina	Slovak	22	0	2	2	38	6	0	2	2	14
2018–19	Milton Keynes Lightning	EIHL	54	5	11	16	124	—	—	—	—	—
2019–20	EC Peiting	Germany3	39	7	29	36	48	—	—	—	—	—
2020–21	EC Peiting	Germany3	28	6	21	27	32	—	—	—	—	—
2021–22	HC Tábor	Czech3	12	1	7	8	16	—	—	—	—	—
2021–22	SV Kaltern	Italy2	10	1	5	6	22	7	1	4	5	6
2022–23	Blue Devils Weiden	Germany3	1	0	1	1	0	—	—	—	—	—
Czech totals			14	0	0	0	6	—	—	—	—	—
Czech2 totals			340	22	63	85	708	20	2	4	6	79
