= Mazanec =

Mazanec is a surname, mostly used in Czechia. Notable people with the surname include:

- Filip Mazanec (also Jiří Filip Massanecz) (1637–1684), Czech painter of the early Baroque style
- Marek Mazanec (born 1991), Czech ice hockey player
- Martin Mazanec (born 1989), Czech ice hockey player
