= Draxinger =

Draxinger is a male German surname meaning "Pioneer", "Sacrificer", or "Respectability". Notable people with the surname include:

- Kevin Draxinger (born 1967), Canadian swimmer
- Tobias Draxinger (born 1985), German ice hockey player
