= 2003–04 Oberliga (ice hockey) season =

German ice hockey season

The 2003–04 Oberliga season was the 45th season for the Oberliga, the then second-level ice hockey league in Germany. It was divided into two groups (South-West and North-East). REV Bremerhaven won the championship and were promoted. A total of 20 teams participated.

== North-East ==
	Team	GP	W	OTW	OTL	L	Pts	GF	GA	Diff.
1.	REV Bremerhaven	36	25	2	1	8	80	171	90	+81
2.	Dresdner Eislöwen	36	24	4	0	8	80	178	110	+68
3.	Lausitzer Füchse	36	17	3	5	11	62	144	111	+33
4.	KEV Hannover	36	17	4	2	13	61	112	84	+28
5.	Mighty Dogs Schweinfurt	36	18	2	3	12	61	142	130	+12
6.	ESV Bayreuth	36	16	3	1	16	55	129	119	+10
7.	Berlin Capitals	36	15	0	2	19	47	101	107	-6
8.	ERC Selb	36	13	2	4	17	47	112	133	-21
9.	ERC Haßfurt	36	11	2	1	22	38	90	146	-56
10.	Höchstadter EC	36	2	0	3	31	9	79	228	-149

== South-West ==
	Team	GP	W	OTW	OTL	L	Pts	GF	GA	Diff.
1.	Moskitos Essen	36	25	4	0	7	83	140	79	+61
2.	HC München 98	36	21	3	4	8	73	138	96	+42
3.	EV Ravensburg	36	22	3	0	11	72	147	116	+31
4.	EC Peiting	36	18	2	0	16	58	115	113	+2
5.	SC Mittelrhein-Neuwied	36	17	1	4	14	57	129	120	+9
6.	Stuttgart Wizards	36	17	1	2	16	55	97	97	0
7.	EV Füssen	36	14	2	2	18	48	118	131	-13
8.	EHC Klostersee	36	11	2	4	19	41	113	129	-16
9.	Eisbären Kempten	36	8	2	1	25	29	88	138	-50
10.	TEV Miesbach	36	7	0	3	26	24	75	141	-66

== Final Round ==
	Team	GP	W	OTW	OTL	L	Pts	GF	GA	Diff.
1.	Moskitos Essen	18	12	2	0	4	40	58	36	+22
2.	REV Bremerhaven	18	11	2	0	5	37	80	44	+36
3.	Mighty Dogs Schweinfurt	18	11	0	1	6	34	73	55	+18
4.	HC München 98	18	10	1	1	6	33	75	51	+24
5.	Dresdner Eislöwen	18	9	0	1	8	28	74	59	+15
6.	Lausitzer Füchse	18	6	2	3	7	''25	58	62	-4
7.	EV Ravensburg	18	7	0	3	8	24	59	67	-8
8.	KEV Hannover	18	7	1	1	9	24	55	77	-22
9.	SC Mittelrhein-Neuwied	18	2	3	2	11	14	47	70	-23
10.	EC Peiting	18	2	2	1	13	11	44	102	-58

== Relegation round ==
	Team	GP	W	OTW	OTL	L	Pts	GF	GA	Diff.
1.	EV Füssen	18	11	1	0	6	35	68	51	+17
2.	Stuttgart Wizards	18	10	1	0	7	31	60	52	+6
3.	EHC Klostersee	18	8	2	3	5	31	60	46	+14
4.	ERC Selb	18	3	3	1	6	31	58	48	+10
5.	ESV Bayreuth	18	9	1	2	6	31	63	61	+2
6.	ERC Haßfurt	18	8	2	0	8	28	58	60	-2
7.	TEV Miesbach	18	8	0	2	8	26	64	62	+2
8.	Berlin Capitals	18	6	1	3	8	25	48	54	-6
9.	Hochstädter EC	18	5	2	2	9	21	55	68	-13
10.	Eisbären Kempten	18	3	1	1	13	12	32	64	-32

== Playoffs ==
Quarter-Finals
1	Moskitos Essen	2
8	KEV Hannover	0
2	REV Bremerhaven	2
7	EV Ravensburg	0
(Pairings are reseeded after the first round)
3	Mighty Dogs Schweinfurt	0
6	Lausitzer Füchse	2
4	HC München 98	2
5	Dresdner Eislöwen	1

Semi-Finals
1	Moskitos Essen	2
6	Lausitzer Füchse	0
2	REV Bremerhaven	2
4	HC München 98	0

Finals
1	Moskitos Essen	0
2	REV Bremerhaven	2
