= Bundesleistungszentrum Kienbaum =

German athlete training facility

- exterior view
- Interactive map of Bundesleistungszentrum Kienbaum
- Location: Kienbaum, Grünheide (Mark), Oder-Spree, Brandenburg, Germany
- Coordinates: 52.464°N 13.952°E

Construction
- Opened: 1952
- Expanded: 1980

Website
- www.kienbaum-sport.de/en

The Bundesleistungszentrum Kienbaum (English: Kienbaum National Training Centre) is a training facility for athletes. It is in the Kienbaum district of Grünheide (Mark) in the Oder-Spree district of Brandenburg, Germany.

== History ==
German Olympic athletes have trained here since 1952. The facility was improved in 1980. Following German reunification, the facility opened to the general public after a period of uncertainty in 1996.

== Facilities ==
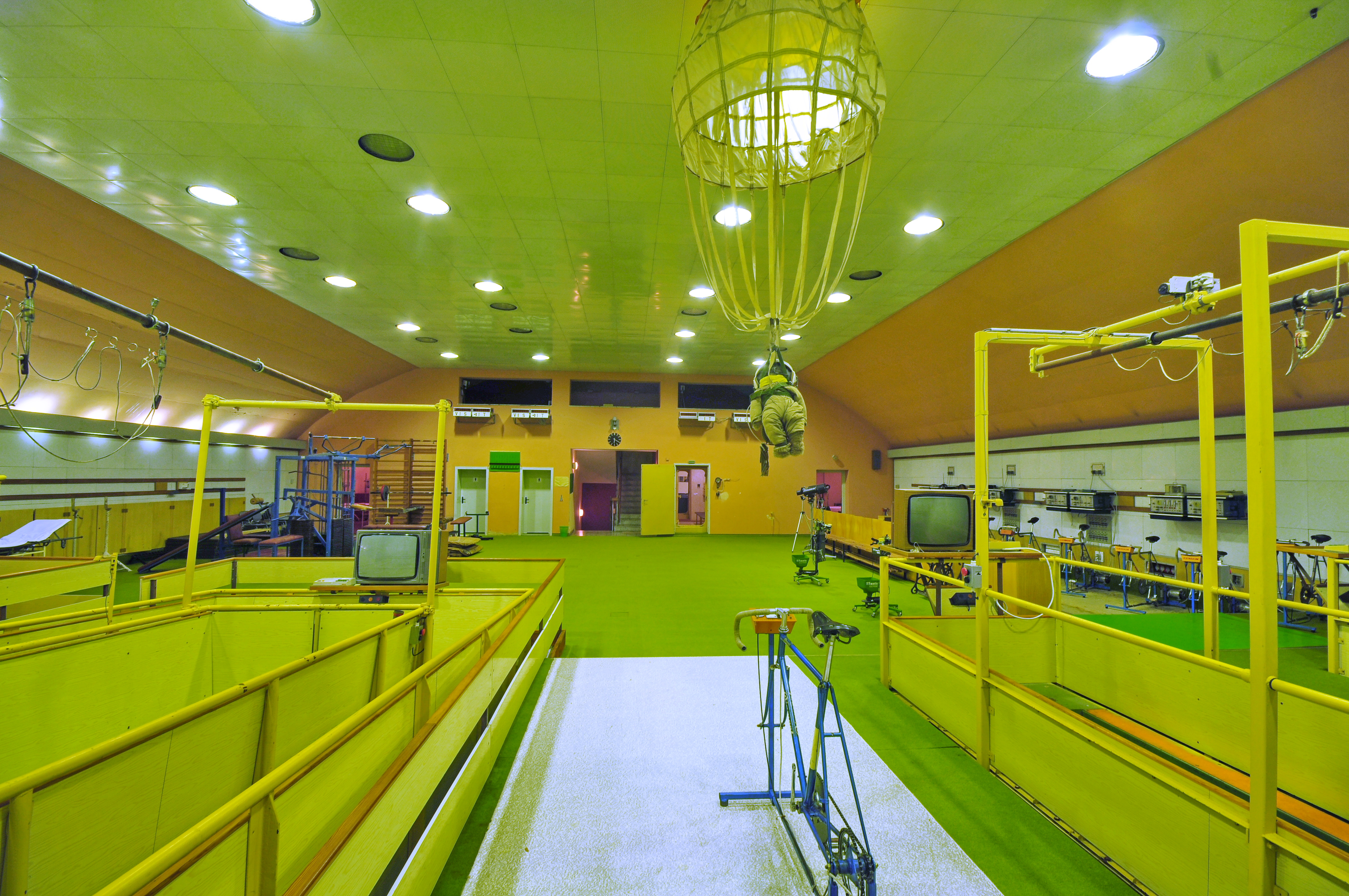
low-pressure room

The facility features a low-pressure underground bunker room, built for altitude training.
