= Garmisch Olympia Stadium =

Arena in Garmisch-Partenkirchen, Germany

Coordinates: 47°29′20″N 11°5′44″E

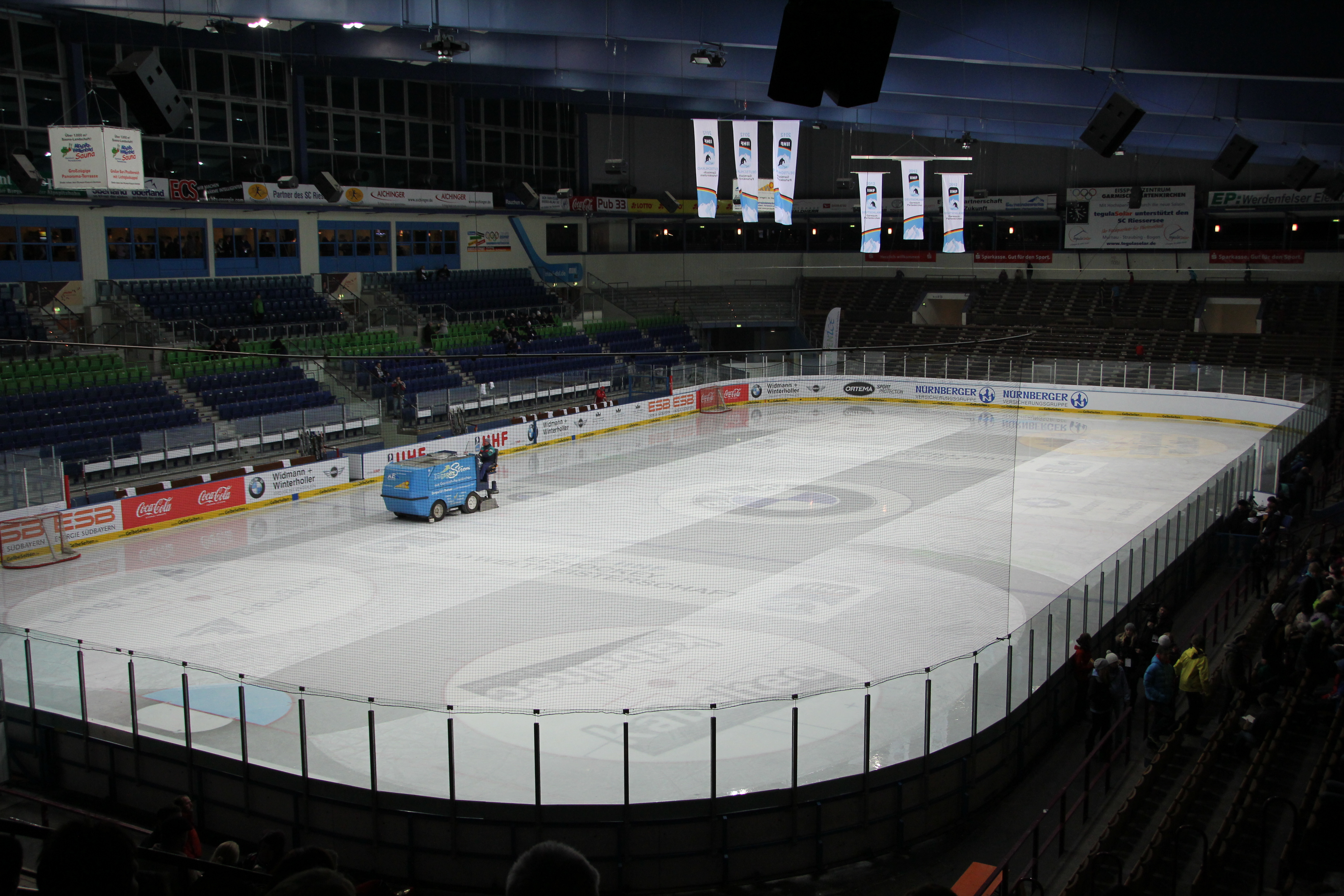
Garmisch Olympia Stadium

Garmisch Olympia Stadium is an arena in Garmisch, Germany. It is primarily used for ice hockey, and is the home arena of the SC Riessersee of the Deutsche Eishockey Liga. Garmisch Olympia Stadium opened in 1935 and holds 6,929 people. It also hosted Germany's single home game during the 1996 World Cup of Hockey. This arena also hosted some hockey and figure skating events at the 1936 Winter Olympics.

The Olympic Ski Stadium is one of the most popular sights in Garmisch-Partenkirchen. It first gained international fame when the 1936 Olympic Games were held here. Today it is famous for the traditional New Year's Ski Jumping that takes place every year as part of the Four Hills Tournament. Visitors can access the ski stadium and the surrounding grounds free of charge any time (except during events).

In 2007, the Olympic Ski Jump, which was built in 1923 and subsequently modernized several times, was torn down completely. It was replaced by a new, gigantic ski jump boasting an inrun tower with a length of 100 meters (328 feet). When standing at the top, you have 62 meters (203 feet) of nothing but air between the surface you are standing on and the ground. In the winter, the new ski jump blends into the surrounding winter landscape thanks to its translucent cladding. The inrun tower is illuminated from the inside in the evening, turning into a fascinating sculpture of light.
