= Hamburg Crocodiles =

- City: Hamburg, Germany
- League: Oberliga
- Division: North
- Founded: 1990; 36 years ago
- Home arena: Eisland Farmsen (capacity: 2,300)
- Colours: Red, Black, White, Green
- Owner(s): Klaus-Peter Jebens
- General manager: Susann Noll
- Head coach: Jacek Płachta
- Captain: Christoph Schubert
- Website: crocodiles-eishockey.de

Franchise history
- 1990–1996: FTV Crocodiles
- 1996–present: Hamburg Crocodiles

The Hamburg Crocodiles are an ice hockey team based in Hamburg, Germany. They currently are members of the North division of the Oberliga, the third level of ice hockey in Germany. The team plays its home games at Eisland Farmsen, located in the district of Farmsen-Berne. The club colors are red and black, supplemented by white and green.

== History ==
=== 1990–1996 ===
The ice hockey division of the Farmenser Turnverein Hamburg was founded in 1990 as "FTV Crocodiles", and was direct successor of the 1. EHC Hamburg. The players of all teams of the EHC changed into the Farmsener TV, which in 1990 would play in the Landesliga. The Crocodiles won the first home game in Farmsen 2–0 against the Altonaer SV, both goals in the last third by Hans Sulzgruber, who developed in the following years to one of the most important players of the club. The average attendance in that first season was about 80 spectators, unless a guest club brought along a large number of spectators.

In the mid-1990s, Hamburg-based entrepreneur Klaus-Peter Jebens decided to build a multifunctional arena in the east part of the city. It should stand on its site at the Höltigbaum and have a capacity of 8,500 to 10,000 spectators. Jebens wanted to build the hall with its own financial resources, but the Hamburg Senate prevented the project on the matter that the infrastructure on the outskirts of Hamburg is not enough for the hall, and there would be no station nearby. However, the city also considered the construction of a new arena to be unavoidable since the old sports halls in Alsterdorf had become about 4,000 seats and in Wandsbek with a capacity of about 2,000 seats too small.

To underline the location of his hall, Klaus-Peter Jebens was looking for an ice hockey team from the east of the city, which he could present as a hive of his planned hall at Höltigbaum.

=== 1996–2000 ===
Jebens became an all-time shareholder of the Crocodiles, which have now been separated from the FTV. A new association emblem, which is still used today in slightly modified form, was introduced. In addition, construction work on the old ice sports hall began, which involved the exchange of wooden benches in shingle seats, the renewal of the sanitary facilities, the installation of a player-friendly press room and the construction of a VIP area. Since the Crocodiles were able to implement the highest budget ever by supporting Jebens in the lower leagues, the athletic rise of the Hamburg team took place in the following years. The Crocodiles were able to climb up into the second-class first league north in three years thanks to the partly double-digit victories and the purchase of licenses from high-class clubs. There the team finished in tenth place in the 1997/98 season, and thus qualified for the newly founded Deutsche Eishockey Liga, which was played as a 2nd Bundesliga from the 1999/00 season.

The spectators had steadily increased in the last few years due to their sporting success against the Düsseldorfer EG, which had previously withdrawn from the Deutsche Eishockey Liga due to financial problems, and other well-known teams of the new second class. The attendance at the hall raised to about 2,300 spectators.

=== 2000–2001 ===
In the summer of 2000, the Crocodiles, which had reached the play-off quarter-final of the 1999/00 season, tried to buy the DEL license of the expelled Starbulls Rosenheim and move into the highest Eishockeyliga. However, the approval of the sale was not approved by the DEL shareholders' meeting. After the citizens of Hamburg announced that they wanted a multi-functional arena for 12,300 spectators in addition to the Volksparkstadion at that time, the Limited Society of the Crocodiles was incorporated by Klaus-Peter Jebens, who, according to his own statement, donated five million german marks during his engagement.

The Farmsener TV succeeded in continuing with a new Society in the Oberliga Nord for a season, which however after the season had to be finally discontinued. The players who were still under contract left the team during the current 2000/01 season, so the team was not able to compete any more. After the audience numbers had declined sharply, the association had to file for insolvency with liabilities of 500,000 german marks.

After the season, the Crocodiles team was reintegrated into the "Stammersverein Farmsener TV" and continued to play under the name "Crocodiles Hamburg" in the Federation League, while the Society was dissolved. In spite of free entry, the number of spectators rarely rose above 100.

=== 2001–2007 ===
After three years in the Federation League, the club managed to qualify for the upper regional league season after a fifth place in the play-offs. The number of spectators increased slightly as a result, while the Crocodiles made the class salary in their first regional league season in the play-downs.

In the 2005/06 season the regional north and east were combined to form the regional league North-East. Participating clubs were the neighbors EC Timmendorfer Strand and Adendorfer EC as well as the Rostock Piranhas, two representatives from Berlin, the ESC Leipzig, the Saale Bulls Halle and the EHV Schönheide. Due to the resulting additional travel costs, the budget was considerably burdened. Since the Crocodiles, in contrast to the top teams from Rostock and Leipzig, whose contract amounted to 780,000 and 1.2 million euros, respectively, had only a budget of 19,800 euros, the team finished last in the main round. In addition, since only one training ice rink was available, the Crocodiles were inferior to the semi-professionals from the other clubs.

Nevertheless, the team ensured category retention in the play-downs, while the local rival Adendorfer EC had to descend for the first time in its history. Due to the lack of audience growth, the costs for this season were ultimately 30,000 euros higher than expected, so that the FTV voluntarily descended into the Federation League, together with the insolvent EC Timmendorfer Strand and the Adendorfer EC. After a bad start to the season with six defeats in a row, disputes within the team, and disagreements due to the change from playmaker Johan Pawletta to the local rival Hamburger SV, the Crocodiles finished the 2006/07 season in seventh place. However, the primary goal was not to achieve again financial losses. The spectator cut was 180 fans, with a total of 300 spectators being counted against the HSV, and 450 against Adendorf.

Even though they could have climbed into the new Regional League North, the club finally abandoned the promotion for economic reasons. Powerful players such as Alexandre Santos, one of the top scorers of the league, Stefan Gebauer and goalkeepers Matthias Rieck and Guido Titzhoff left the Crocodiles and switched to the city rival Hamburger SV, which could compete in the higher-ranking regional league. In addition, Erich Dumpis joined the EHC Timmendorfer Strand 06.

=== 2007–2010 ===
In spite of the departures of the players, the team was able to win against nine teams in a row. Only in Salzgitter, Altona and Osterode the team were defeated after penalty shootouts. The first local derby after a long time rival Altonaer SV was won by the Crocodiles in Farmsen 7–2.

The interest in the audience also rose again. Against the direct competitors around the championship title, the EHC Osterode were 500 spectators in the hall, and to the game in Osterode over 50 fans travel to support the team. Against the junior team of the Hannover Scorpions, in which played the DEL legend Len Soccio, 800 spectators came to the indoor ice rink, which meant the highest number of spectators in a duty game since the 2000/2002 season. In view of the still difficult financial situation, the Crocodiles, however, renounced once again to ascend. However, the league management of the Lower Saxony ice sports federation urged that the Crocodiles, as champions, should exercise their right of ascent or instead descend into the national league. Finally, a compromise was concluded, forcing the first men's team to be forced into the regional league and the continuation of the play company as a 1b team, and the founding of a new team with the additional name Juniors in the federation league. The FTV committed itself to playing in every game of the Juniors with at least twelve U23 players. The Juniors team, however, consisted largely of the squad of the pre-season, supplemented with some players from the youth and junior section. At the end of the season, the team finished forth after the Wedemark Scorpions, the REV Bremerhaven 1b and the Salzgitter Steelers.

In the 2009/10 season, the Crocodiles start with the First Men's Team in the Regionalliga, although they were unable to qualify the last year.

=== 2010–present ===
By the league reformation of the 3rd game class in the summer of 2010, the team of the Crocodiles participated in the Oberliga Nord 2010/11 and reached the eight after the preliminary round. In the 2011/12 season, the team reached third place in the relegation round after 8th place after the main round. In the 2012/13 season, the team finished in the seventh round and finished third in the third round. Although the Crocodiles were in financial difficulties during the 2014/15 season, and they did not play well for a while, they finish in sixth place after the preliminary round and in fifth place after the playoffs, their best placement of the last 15 years. A season later, the Crocodiles were 18th and last place after the main round. They were able to place themselves in front of the local rival HSV and the clubs of Prussia and FASS. For the 2016/17 season, the farmers fired a surprise with the signing of Christoph Schubert, the former captain of the recently defunct Hamburg Freezers.

== Positions since 2010 ==
Season	League	Reagular season	Playoffs
2010/11	Oberliga Nord	8th place	2nd place Oberliga Nord Endrunde Group B
2011/12	Oberliga Nord	8th place	4th place Oberliga Nord Relegation Groupe B
2012/13	Oberliga Nord	7th place	3rd place Oberliga Nord Platzierungsrunde, 5th place Oberliga Nord Pokal
2013/14	Oberliga Nord	8th place	4th place Oberliga Nord Pokal
2014/15	Oberliga Nord	6th place	5th place Oberliga Nord Play-offs
2015/16	Oberliga Nord	18th place	1st place Oberliga Nord Abstiegsrunde
2016/17	Oberliga Nord	4th place	5th place Oberliga Nord Play-offs
2017/18	Oberliga Nord	9th place	2nd place Oberliga Nord qualifying round
