= PreZero Rheinlandhalle =

Arena in Duisburg, Germany

Coordinates: 51°24′24″N 6°46′47″E

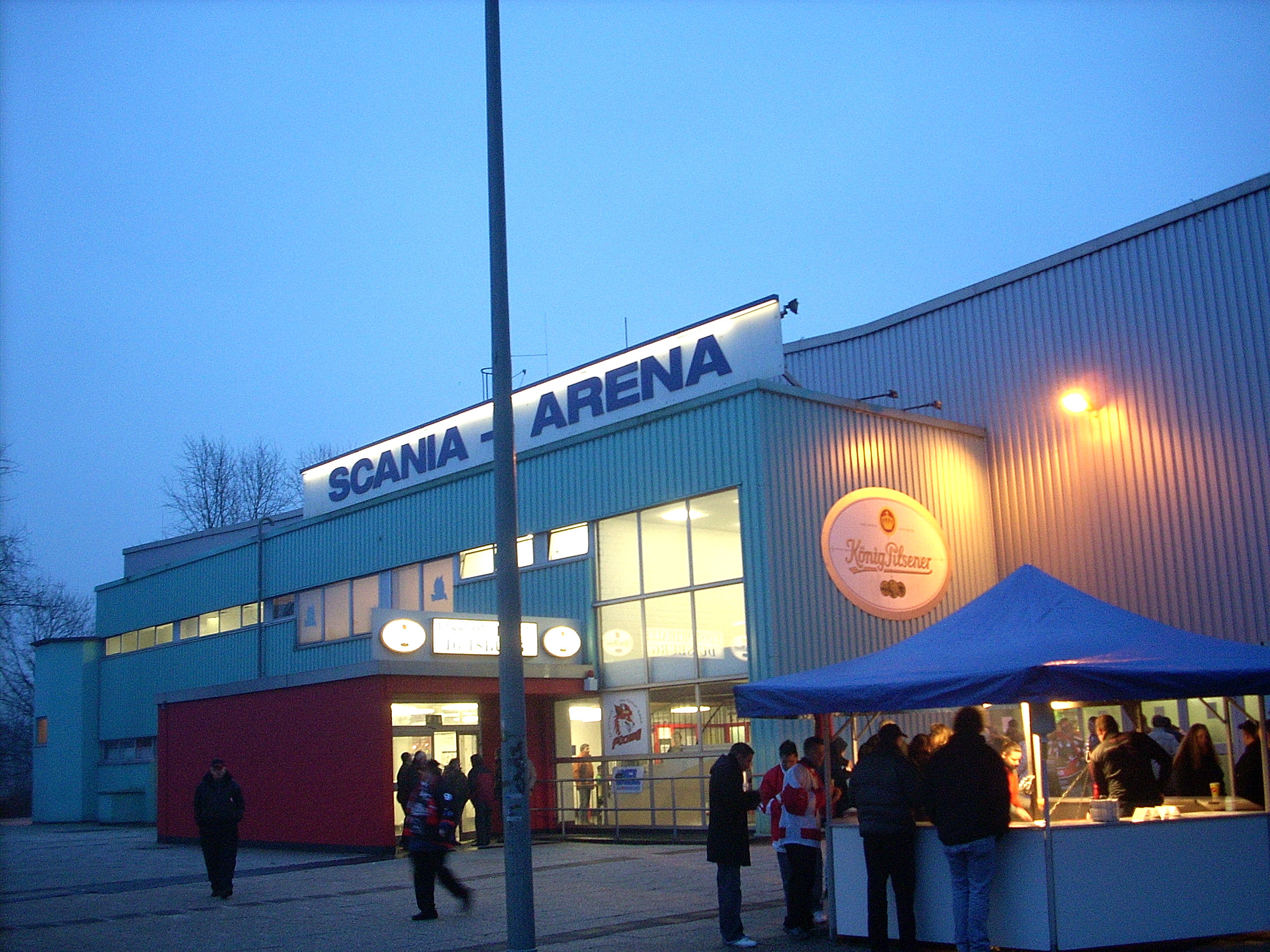
PreZero Rheinlandhalle (formerly Scania Arena)

PreZero Rheinlandhalle is an indoor arena in Duisburg, Germany which was named by PreZero, part of the family-owned multinational retail group Schwarz Gruppe. It is primarily used for ice hockey and is the home arena of Füchse Duisburg (English: Duisburg Foxes). It opened in 1970 and holds 4,800 people.

== Previous names ==
- Eissporthalle Duisburg (1971–)
- SCANIA-Arena (–2017)
- Kenston-Arena (2017–2019)
- Jomizu-Arena (2019–2021)

The Arena was renamed to KENSTON ARENA by the beginning of the Hockey Season 2017/18.
