= Hannover Indians =

EC Hannover Indians
- City: Hannover
- League: Oberliga
- Founded: 1948
- Home arena: Eisstadion am Pferdeturm (Capacity: 4,608)
- Colours: Blue, white, red
- Head coach: Peter Willmann
- Affiliate: Hannover Braves (dissolved 2012)

Franchise history
- 1948-1956: ESG Hannover
- 1956-1963: RESG Hannover
- 1963-1984: EC Hannover
- 1984-1996: EC in Hannover
- 1996-1998: Hannover Turtles
- 1998-Present: Hannover Indians

The Hannover Indians are a professional German ice hockey team and public limited company from Hanover in Lower Saxony, Germany. The current club was founded in 1998 after the bankruptcy of a previous one, and has been named Hannover Indians since then. The club itself was called Kleefelder Eissportverein (KEV) until 2006 when it was renamed to the EC Hannover Indians. Since 2002 the team had played in the Oberliga and was promoted to the 2nd Division in 2008.

In 2013 they had to declare bankruptcy and automatically dropped down to the third-tier Oberliga. Due to the massive financial support of fans and sponsors the club was able to furthermore participate in the competition. They ended the 2013–2014 season in third place.

== Season records ==
Season	Games	Won	OTW	SOW	OTL	SOL	Lost	Points	Goals for	Goals against	Rank	Playoffs
Oberliga Nord 2007-08	52	28	6	—	6	—	12	102	219	160	3	Lost in quarterfinals
Oberliga Nord 2008-09	54	34	7	—	4	—	9	120	251	149	1	Promoted
2nd Bundesliga 2009-10	52	11	2	3	2	4	30	49	134	199	13	No playoffs/ Relegation
Abstiegsrunde 2009–10; Relegation Round	Defeated EHC Freiburg 4 games to 1											Saved
2nd Bundesliga 2010–11	48	14	6	0	3	4	21	61	133	148	9	Lost in Pre-Playoffs
2nd Bundesliga 2011–12	48	17	3	4	0	5	19	70	134	147	8	Lost in quarterfinals
2nd Bundesliga 2012–13												11th place
Oberliga North 2013–14												3rd place

== Tournament results ==
Year	1st round	2nd round	Quarterfinals	Semifinals	Finals
Eishockeypokal 2006–07	L, 3–5, Fischtown Pinguins	—	—	—	—
DEB-Pokal 2009–10	—	L, 1–6, Fischtown Pinguins	—	—	—
DEB-Pokal 2010–11	W, 3–0, Saale Bulls Halle	W, 4–3, SC Bietigheim-Bissingen	L, 3–4, Starbulls Rosenheim	—	—
DEB-Pokal 2011–12	W, 4–1, Deggendorf Fire	W, 2–0, Heilbronner Falken	W, 3–2, Frankfurt Lions	L, 0–3, SC Bietigheim-Bissingen	—
