= Blue Lions Leipzig =

EXA Icefighters Leipzig
- City: Leipzig, Germany
- League: Oberliga
- Conference: North
- Founded: 2010
- Home arena: Kohlrabizirkus Leipzig
- Colours: Blue, White, Black
- General manager: André Krüll
- Head coach: Sven Gerike
- Website: http://www.icefighters-leipzig.de

The Blue Lions Leipzig were an ice hockey team in Leipzig, Germany. They played in the Oberliga, the third level of German ice hockey. The Blue Lions were founded in 1998. They filed for insolvency in 2010.

In 2010 a new team was founded under the name of "Icefighters Leipzig". After the closing down and demolition of the "Alte Messehalle 6" at the "old Leipzig Trade Fair ground" a temporary tent construction was built in Taucha, a suburb of Leipzig, to be the new playground.

Before the 2018/2019-Season it was announced the team will return to Leipzig to play in an exhibition hall called "Kohlrabizirkus" (circus of turnip cabbage) near the old Leipzig Trade Fair ground.
