= TecArt Black Dragons Erfurt =

German professional ice hockey team

- City: Erfurt, Germany
- League: Oberliga
- Division: North
- Founded: 2006
- Home arena: Eissportzentrum Erfurt (capacity: 4,00)
- Colors: Black, gold, red
- General manager: Martin Deutschmann
- Head coach: Raphael Joly
- Captain: Eric Wunderlich
- Website: www.black-dragons-erfurt.de

The TecArt Black Dragons Erfurt are an ice hockey team based in Erfurt, the capital of Thuringia, Germany. The team currently plays in the Oberliga North, the third-highest level of ice hockey in Germany. It is the top team of the larger Eis Hockey Club Erfurt e.V.

== Arena ==
The team plays at the 4,000-seat Eissportzentrum Erfurt, referred to locally as the Kartoffelhalle (Potato Hall). In 2020 the city of Erfurt approved a major expansion and renovation of the venue.

== History ==
Though EHC Erfurt was founded in 1995, the Black Dragons began play in 2006.

== Honours ==
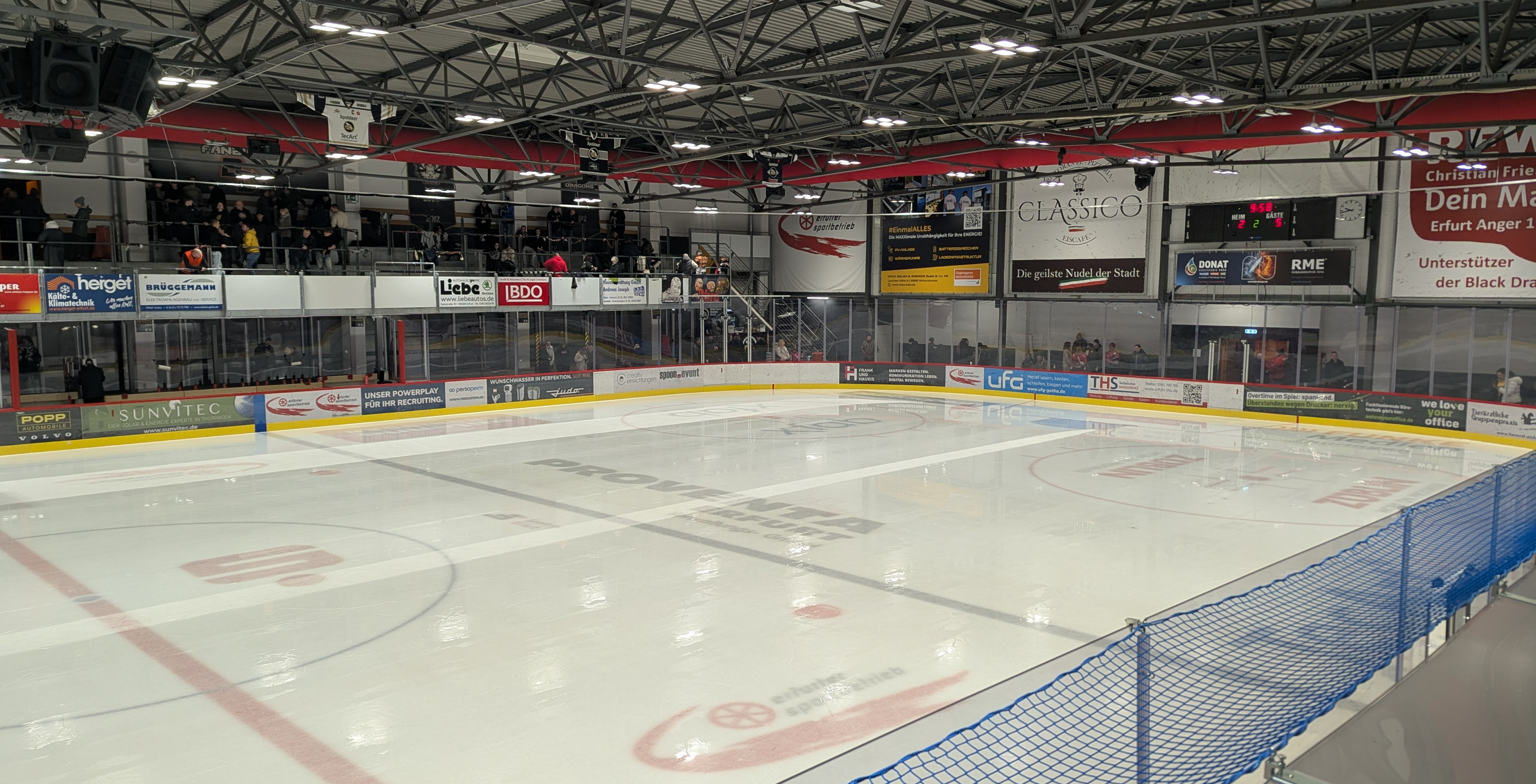
Interior of the Eissportzentrum Erfurt (2026)

As of March 2024

- Hessenliga

Champions: 1991/1992
Runner-up: 1993/1994

- Regionalliga Hesse

Champions: 1994/1995, 1995/1996

- Regionalliga North Rhine-Westphalia

Champions: 1997/1998

- Regionalliga East

Runner-up: 2008/2009

- Oberliga East

Runner-up: 2013/2014
