= Rostock Piranhas =

- City: Rostock, Mecklenburg
- League: Oberliga
- Founded: 1953
- Home arena: Eishalle Rostock (capacity: 2,000)
- Colours: Red, White, Red
- Head coach: Wolfgang Wünsche
- Website: piranhas.de

Franchise history
- 1953: founded as BSG Motor Rostock
- 1990–present: Rostocker EC (fusion of several former clubs, Piranhas since 2004)

The Rostock Piranhas are the male first team of the Rostocker Ice Hockey Club, based in Rostock, Germany. The team plays in the North Section of the Oberliga (Upper League), the third tier of German ice hockey. The team's home ice is the Eishalle Rostock at the Schillingallee in the Kröpeliner-Tor-Vorstadt (KTV) area of Rostock, next to DKB-Arena.

== History ==
Ice hockey has always been a popular sport in Germany and in Rostock. In 1955/1956, SG Dynamo Rostock were part of the DDR 1. Liga. In the 1956/57 season, the Dynamo were joined on the ice by a team from SC Empor Rostock.

In the 1970s, both Dynamo and Empor had folded, to be replaced by BSG Chemie 70 Rostock. By this time, ice hockey in East Germany was very much a minority sport and BSG Chemie played very few games. The East German government minimised the amount that ice hockey was allowed to be played due to the cost. East Germany had the smallest ice hockey league in the world: two teams, Dynamo Berlin (now known as Eisbären Berlin) and SG Dynamo Weißwasser (now known as Lausitzer Füchse).

After the collapse of communism in 1989, ice hockey teams began to revive and the team was officially formed on 18 July 1990. On 10 November 1990, the newly formed team took to the ice for their first game just over a month after German reunification.

The team mainly found itself in the Verbandsliga (5th division) and Regionalliga (4th division) levels during this time, with the team slowly growing in popularity. The team's first title came when they won the Regionalliga championship for the 1999/2000 season but ultimately they did not make the step up to the Oberliga.

== From REC to Piranhas ==
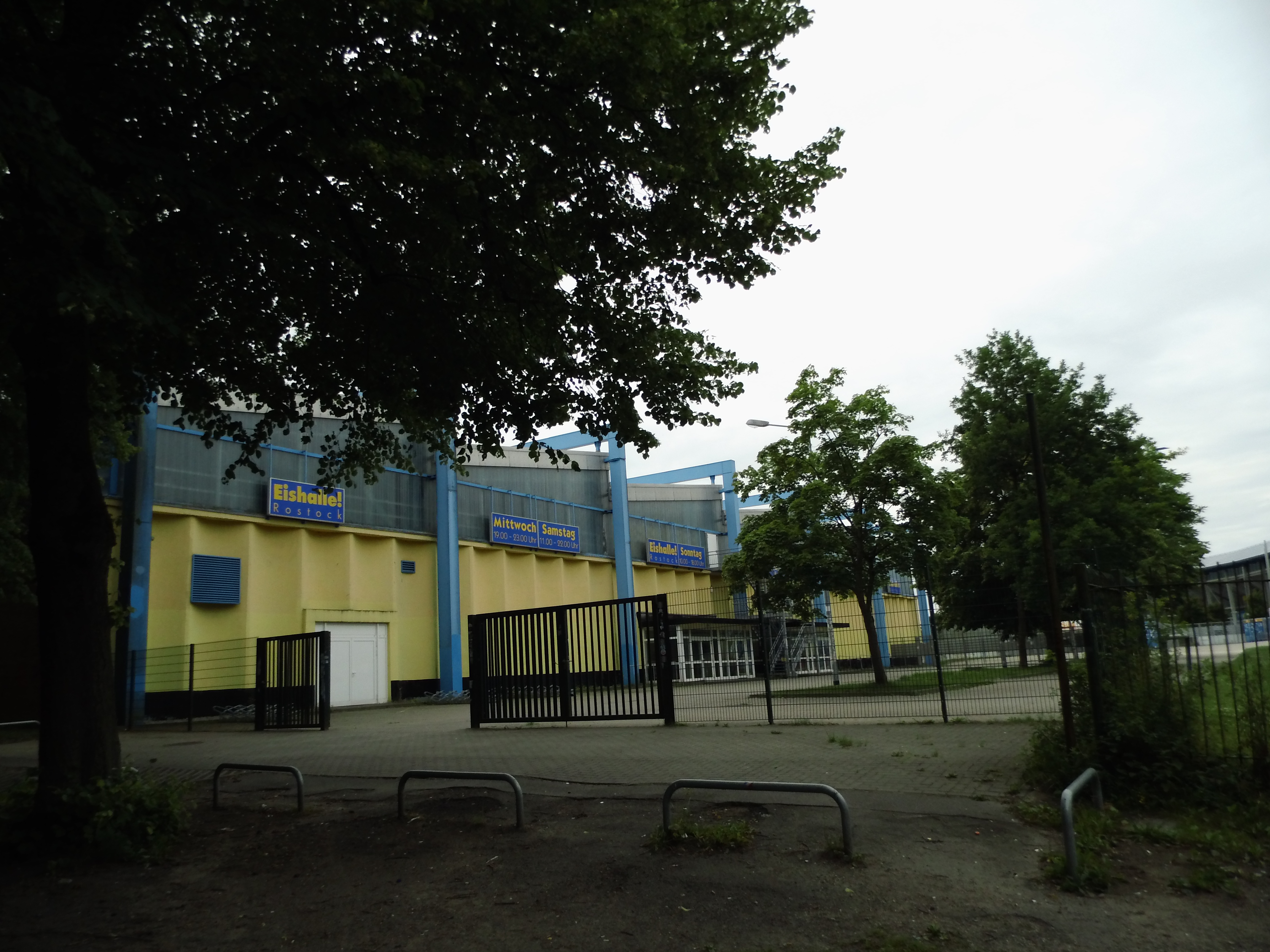
Eishalle Rostock, home ice of the Piranhas

For the 2004/05 season, the team adopted the name "Piranhas" as the name for the first team. The team played the season in the Regionalliga Nord/Ost which fed into the promotion stages with the Regionalliga Nordrhein-Westfalen. Rostock qualified for the promotion stage (Meisterrunde) but failed to secure promotion, finishing third. The season had many highlights including beating promoted Ratinger Ice Aliens 97 3-0 at home as well as the retirement of Rostock ice hockey legend Dimitri Kramerenko.

The 2005-06 season started well for the Piranhas as they ran away with the league before Christmas and easily qualified for the promotion round. After the Christmas break, the team faltered at the start of the promotion round and Josef Kovachek was replaced behind the bench by Andreas Bentenrieder. The coaching change reinvigorated the side as they beat arch rivals Halle 04 Saale Bulls in the playoff semi-finals before defeating Blue Lions Leipzig 2-1 in the finals series to claim the team's second championship. The team were offered promotion to the Oberliga but turned it down due to the financial instability of the league and its impending structural change.

The 2006-07 season started with another coaching change as Bentenrieder was replaced by former Olympic gold medal winner and Soviet national star Sergei Yashin. The season was a two-horse race between the Piranhas and Leipzig, with the Blue Lions claiming top spot in the league. Both teams ended up moving up from the Regionalliga.

== Oberliga ==
With the restructuring of the Oberliga, the club applied for and were granted a license for the league. It would be the first time a team from Rostock had played ice hockey at a national level for over 35 years. The league allowed five non-German players.

The 2007-08 season saw Yashin's side storm away to the top of the Northern group early on but around Christmas time, the team faltered. Yashin lost the confidence of the team and the board, and was sacked close to the end of the season. Club captain David Hördler briefly took over coaching duties.

2008-09 season saw former Timmendorfer Strand Beach Boys coach Henry Thom join the team as coach. The five-import rule remained but the team saw itself with many roster changes. League rules changed to make it mandatory for all teams to have only German netminders. This season saw three North American import players, the most in recent times. Rostock qualified for the promotion playoffs losing a five-game series to Rote Teufel Bad Nauheim.

== Back to the Regionalliga ==
At the end of the 2008-09 season there was further shuffling in Oberliga and the leagues below, and Rostock was faced with a problem. The Hannover Indians had won promotion to the Second Bundesliga. The Eisbären Juniors Berlin (the under 21 side of the German champions) announced they were withdrawing from the league and were joined by Leipzig and the Halle 04 Saale Bulls. With travel costs for the season mounting, the board decided to withdraw the club from the Oberliga and the club joined the newly formed Regionalliga Nord. The Regionalliga Nord formed part of German fourth tier with the Regionalliga Ost (bolstered by Leipzig and Halle), the Regionalliga West, the Regionalliga Südwest, and the Bayernliga.

== Retired numbers ==
Rostock has two retired numbers.

#21 Dimitri Kramerenko

Kramerenko moved from his native Ukraine to play in Rostock and made his debut on 8 January 1994. When he arrived, Kramerenko spoke virtually no German but his talented and high-scoring style of play won the fans over. In 310 games for the club, "Dimi" scored 511 goals and 423 assists (934 points). His last official game was on 6 February 2005. His career was ended by a serious knee injury. Kramerenko was granted a testimonial against Dynamo Minsk, which took place at the Eishalle Rostock on 21 March 2005. It was announced that #21 would never be worn in Rostock again. After over 10 years in Germany, Kramerenko earned his German passport and now works in Rostock as a PE teacher and coaches the city's inline hockey team, the Rostocker Nasenbären.

#35 Branislav Hippik

Hippik, a Slovak, moved from his hometown team to join Rostock at the start of the 2004/05 season and made his debut on 12 September 2004. The popular goalkeeper earned the nickname "Happy Hippo", which was often heard being chanted throughout the rink whenever he made a save. Hippik earned a reputation throughout the league for his breathtaking saves, original style of play, and for doing headstands on ice when the team won.

During his first season with the team, during a game at home against Schönheide Wölfe, the visitors were trailing in the last few moments and pulled their goalkeeper for an extra attacker. A visiting player lost control of the puck and Hippik proceeded to fire the puck the length of the ice into the open net.

Hippik made the transition with the team from Regionalliga to Oberliga and played throughout the 2007-2008 season. He made his last appearance on 16 March 2008, after it was announced that for the 2008-09 season, all teams must have German netminders. Rostock fans were devastated and after the season finale friendly game, Hippik was asked to take off his jersey. It was raised to the rafters with him watching.

For the 2008-09 season, Hippik signed for Dunaujvaros in Hungary but was released midway through the season.
