= Füchse Duisburg =

- Nickname: "Foxes"
- City: Duisburg
- League: Oberliga
- Division: West
- Founded: 1971
- Home arena: Scania Arena (capacity: 4,800)
- Colours
- Owner: KENSTON Sport GmbH
- General manager: Matthias Roos
- Head coach: Matthias Roos
- Affiliates: Kölner Haie
- Website: fuechse-duisburg.de

Franchise history
- Füchse Duisburg

The Füchse Duisburg are a German ice hockey team. Formerly a member of the Deutsche Eishockey Liga, the team currently plays in the Oberliga.

== History ==
Known in English as the Duisburg Foxes, the team was founded in 1971.

In 2005, they earned promotion to Germany's top league, the Deutsche Eishockey Liga, where they would play the next four seasons. On March 16, 2009, it was announced that the team would leave the DEL and play in the Regionalliga NRW for the 2009-10 season.

=== Names ===
- Duisburger SC (1971–1987)
- Duisburger SV (1987–1991)
- EV Duisburg (1991–2004)
- Füchse Duisburg (2004–present)
