= Deggendorf Fire =

Deggendorfer SC
- City: Deggendorf, Germany
- League: Oberliga
- Founded: 1953
- Operated: 2002–present
- Home arena: Hitzkopf-Arena
- Colours: Red, blue
- Head coach: Casey Fratkin
- Captain: Curtis Leinweber
- Website: www.dsc-eishockey.de

Franchise history
- 1953-1981: Deggendorfer SC
- 1982-2001: Deggendorfer EC
- 2002-Present: Deggendorfer SC

The Deggendorfer SC (also known as the Deggendorf Fire) is a professional ice hockey club based in Deggendorf, Bavaria, Germany. The club currently competes in Oberliga, the third level of ice hockey in Germany. The Fire was originally founded in 1973 with the current operations setup in 2002. Deggendorfer’s home arena is the Eissporthalle an der Trat, which holds 4,000 spectators. The club also operates junior ice hockey and figure skating programs.

== Titles ==
Oberliga

- Champions (1): 1976

Regionalliga

- Champions (1): 1990

German Junior Championship

- Champions (1): 2002

== Season-by-season-record ==
Champions	Runners-up	Third Place	Promoted	Relegated

Season	League	P	W	OW	OL	L	GF	GA	GD	Pts	Finish	Postseason
Deggendorfer EC
2007–08	Oberliga	54	18	5	2	29	207	244	-37	66	8th	RPW
2008–09	Oberliga	62	12	2	6	42	210	363	-153	46	8th	DNQ
2009–10	Oberliga	40	11	2	3	24	83	161	-78	40	11th	DNQ
2010–11	Oberliga	44	11	11	3	19	127	156	-29	58	7th	PQL
2011–12	Oberliga	40	16	3	4	17	152	161	-9	58	5th	R16L
2012–13	Oberliga	40	11	7	3	19	140	175	-35	50	9th	RPW
2013–14	Oberliga	44	14	4	2	24	144	188	-44	52	10th	RPW
Deggendorfer SC
2014–15	Oberliga	44	18	2	4	20	120	154	-34	62	8th	QFL
2015–16	Oberliga	40	15	6	3	16	141	142	-1	60	7th	QFL
2016–17	Oberliga	46	21	3	4	18	167	150	+17	73	5th	QFL
2017–18	Oberliga	46	29	4	3	10	201	141	+60	98	1st	RU (P)
2018–19	DEL2	52	14	5	2	31	161	218	-57	54	14th	REL
