= EC Peiting =

- City: Peiting, Germany
- League: Oberliga
- Founded: 1968
- Home arena: Eissporthalle Peiting
- Colours: Red, White, Blue

EC Peiting is an ice hockey team in Peiting, Germany. They play in the Oberliga, the third level of ice hockey in Germany. The club was founded in 1968.

== Achievements ==
- Oberliga champion: 1974
