= Amédée =

Amédée is a French masculine forename. Notable people with the forename include:

== Persons ==
- Amédée, stage name of Philippe de Chérisey (1923–1985), French writer, radio humorist, surrealist and actor
- Amédée Artus (1815–1892), French conductor and composer
- Amédée Baillot de Guerville (1869–1913), French war correspondent
- Amédée de Béjarry (1840–1916), French politician
- Amédée Bollée (1844–1917), French bellfounder and inventor
- Amédée Borrel (1867–1936), French biologist
- Amédée Courbet (1827–1885), French army admiral
- Amédée Dechambre (1812–1886), French physician
- Amédée Despans-Cubières (1786–1853), French army general
- Amédée Domenech (1933–2003), French rugby union player and politician
- Amédée Dumontpallier (1826–1899), French gynecologist
- Amédée Dunois (1878–1945), French lawyer, journalist, politician
- Amédée Faure (1801–1878), French painter
- Amédée Fengarol (1905–1951), French politician
- Amédée E. Forget (1847–1923), Canadian lawyer, civil servant, politician
- Amédée Forestier (1854–1930), French-British artist
- Amédée Fournier (1912–1992), French bicycle racer
- Amédée Gaboury (1838–1912), Canadian physician and politician
- Amédée Galzin (1853–1925), French gynecologist
- Amédée Geoffrion (1867–1935), Canadian lawyer and politician
- Amédée Gibaud (1885–1957), French chess player
- Amédée Girod de l'Ain (1781–1847), French lawyer and politician
- Amédée Gordini (1899–1979), Italian-born French race car driver and manufacturer
- Amédée Gosselin (1863–1941), Canadian historian, Roman Catholic priest
- Amédée Guillemin (1826–1893), French science writer and journalist
- Amédée Henri Guillemin (1860–1941), French WWI general
- Amédée Jacques (1813–1865), French-Argentine pedagogue
- Amédée de Jallais (1826–1909), French playwright, opera librettist
- Amédée Joullin (1862–1917), French-American painter
- Amédée Emmanuel François Laharpe (1754–1796), French army general
- Amédée Louis Michel le Peletier, comte de Saint-Fargeau (1770–1845), French entomologist
- Amédée Lynen (1852–1938), Belgian painter
- Amédée Maingard (1918–1981), Mauritius-born French military personnel
- Amédée Mannheim (1831–1906), French mathematician
- Amédée Melanson (1882–1930), Canadian politician
- Amédée Méreaux (1802–1874), French musicologist, pianist, composer
- Amédée Ozenfant (1886–1966), French painter
- Amédée de Noé (1818–1879), French caricaturist, lithographer
- Amédée Papineau (1819–1903), Canadian writer
- Amédée Pauwels (1864–1894), Belgian anarchist
- Amédée Pichot (1795–1877), French historian and translator
- Amédée Pofey, 13th-century lord and knight
- Amédée Wilfrid Proulx (1932–1993), American Roman Catholic bishop
- Amédée Rolland (1914–2000), French racing cyclist
- Amédée Ronzel (1909-?), French bobsledder
- Amédée Thierry (1797–1873), French journalist and historian
- Amédée Thubé (1884–1941), French sailor
- Amédée Tremblay (1876–1949), Canadian organist, composer
- Amédée Trichard, French long-distance runner
- Amédée Turner (1929–2021), British barrister
- Jean-Amédée Gibert (1869–1945), French painter, architect, and curator

== See also ==
- Amadea (disambiguation)
- Amadee (disambiguation)
- Amedeo (disambiguation)
- Amadeus (disambiguation)
