= Amede =

Amede or variation, may refer to:

== People ==
- Amédé Ardoin (1898–1942), U.S. Louisiana Creole musician
- Amede Breaux (1900–1975), U.S. Cajun musician
- Amédé Froger (died 1956), Mayor of Boufarik assassinated during the Battle of Algiers (1956–1957)
- Amédé Gayot (19th century), President of the Senate (Haiti)
- Amede Nzeribe, child of Flora Nwapa (1931–1993)
- L. Amede Obiora, Nigerian lawyer, professor, author
- George Joseph Amede Coulon (1854–1922), artist and son of George David Coulon
- Menen Liben Amede (died 1858), Empress consort to Yohannes III of Ethiopia

=== Fictional characters ===
- Amede, a character from the 1966 novel Efuru
- Amédé Chabert, a character from the film Colonel Chabert (1994 film)

== Places ==
- Amede, Mgbakwu, Awka North, Anambra, Nigeria; see List of villages in Anambra State
- Amede, Eha-Amufu, Isi-Uzo, Enugu, Nigeria; see List of villages in Enugu State
- Amede, former name of Domat/Ems, Imboden, Graubünden, Switzerland

== Other uses ==
- Amédé (poem), a 2010 poem by Georgette LeBlanc (poet)

== See also ==
- Amédès, a character from the 1789 opera Nephté
- Amedes Holding GmbH, a subsidiary of OMERS
- Amade (name)
- Amadea (disambiguation)
- Amadee (disambiguation)
- Amadeus (disambiguation)
- Amedee (disambiguation)
- Amedeo (disambiguation)
- Ahmad (disambiguation)
