= Amadio =

Amadio is an Italian name. People with the name include:

== Surname ==
- Bruno Amadio (1911–1981), Italian painter
- Dave Amadio (1939–1981), Canadian ice hockey player
- Greg Amadio (born 1981), Canadian ice hockey defenceman
- John Amadio (1883–1964), Australian flute player
- Ligia Amadio, Brazilian conductor
- Marco Amadio (born 1999), Italian footballer
- Michael Amadio (born 1996), Canadian ice hockey center
- Neville Amadio (1913–2006), Australian flute player
- Norman Amadio (1928–2020), Canadian jazz pianist, teacher, and composer
- Remo Amadio (born 1987), Italian footballer
- Roberto Amadio (born 1963), Italian sports manager and cyclist
- Silvio Amadio (1926–1995), Italian film director and screenwriter
- Stefano Amadio (born 1989), Italian footballer

== Given name ==
- Amadio Freddi (1570–1634), Italian composer

== Precedents ==
- Commercial Bank of Australia Ltd v Amadio, 1983 High Court of Australia judgement

== See also ==
- Amadeo (disambiguation)
- Amadeus (disambiguation)
- Amedeo, given name
