= Amade =

Amade is both a given name and a surname. Notable people with the name include:

== Given name ==
- Amade Aba (died 1311), Hungarian noble
- Amade Camal (1954–2025), Mozambican politician and businessman
- Wolfgang Amadè Mozart (1756–1791; aka "Mozart"), Austrian classical composer

== Surname ==
- Andre Amade (born 1983), Brazilian mixed martial artist

== See also ==
- Amadea (disambiguation)
- Amadee (disambiguation)
- Amadeo (disambiguation)
- Amadeus (disambiguation)
- Amédée (disambiguation)
- Amedeo (disambiguation)
- Ahmad (disambiguation)
