= Amadeus (name) =

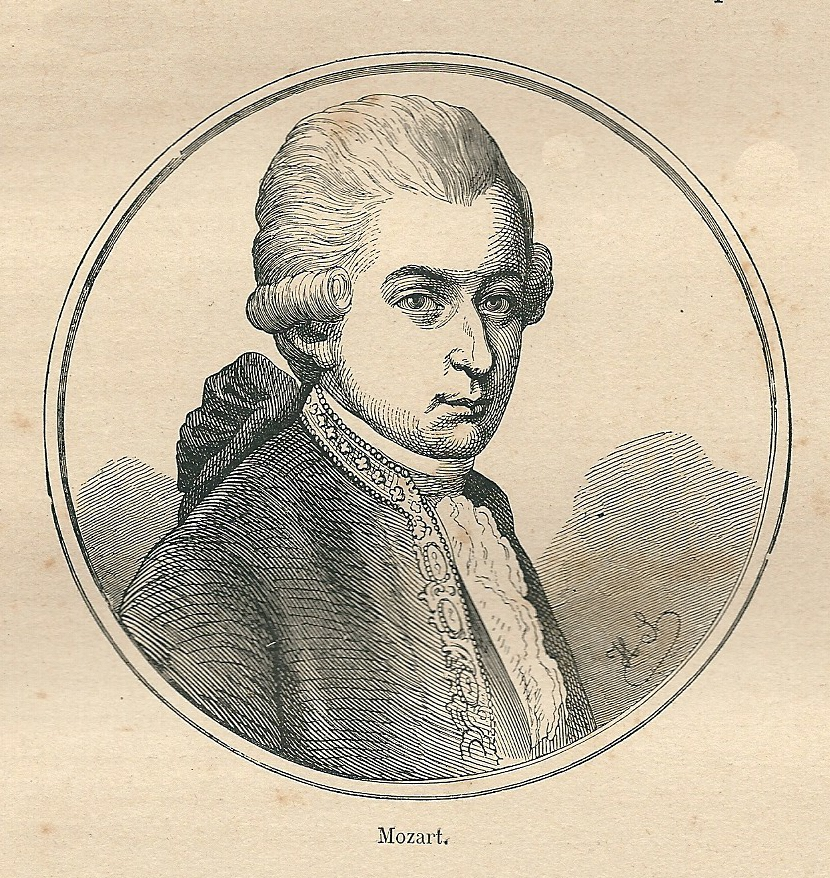
Wolfgang Amadeus Mozart

Amadeus is a theophoric given name derived from the Latin words ama – the imperative of the word amare ("to love") – and deus ("god"). As a linguistic compound in the form of a phereoikos, the name can be taken to mean either "love of God", in other words, that the person is loved by God or "one who loves God".

The best-known bearer of the name is the composer Wolfgang Amadeus Mozart (see Mozart's name).

== Equivalent and similar names ==
Borrowings include the female form, "Amadea", the French "Amédée" (male), the Spanish "Amadeo", the Catalan and Portuguese "Amadeu", the Italian "Amedeo", the Polish "Amadeusz", and the Slovenian "Amadej".

Similar calques include the German "Gottlieb", Slavic names "Bogomil" and "Bohumil" meaning "Dear to God", as well as "Bogolyub", meaning "he who loves God". The Hebrew "Yedidia" and the Arabic "Habibullah" mean "Beloved of God". The Greek name "Theophilos" means "friend of God".

== People ==
=== Nobles ===
- Amadeo I of Spain (1845–1890), Italian prince, King of Spain 1870 to 1873, also known as Amadeus
- Amadeus, Prince of Achaea (1363–1402), also Lord of Piedmont and Lord of Pinerolo
- Amadeus I, Count of Geneva (1098–1178)
- Amadeus II of Geneva (died 1308), Count of Geneva
- Amadeus III, Count of Geneva (1311–1367)
- Amadeus IV of Geneva (died 1369), Count of Geneva
- Amadeus II of Montfaucon (1130–1195), Count of Montbéliard
- Amadeus, Count of Neuchâtel (died 1285)
- Amadeus I, Count of Savoy (c. 975–c. 1052)
- Amadeus II, Count of Savoy (c. 1016–1050)
- Amadeus III, Count of Savoy (1095–1148)
- Amadeus IV, Count of Savoy ((1197–1253)
- Amadeus V, Count of Savoy ((1249–1323)
- Amadeus VI, Count of Savoy (1334–1383)
- Amadeus VII, Count of Savoy (1360–1391)
- Amadeus VIII, Duke of Savoy (1383–1451), Antipope Felix V
- Amadeus IX, Duke of Savoy (1435–1472)
- Amadeus Aba (died 1311), Hungarian oligarch who ruled de facto the northern and north-eastern counties of the Kingdom of Hungary
- Amadeus Gutkeled, Hungarian nobleman and ispán

=== Religious figures ===
- Amadeus de Bie (1844–1920), Belgian Abbot-General of the Cistercian order
- Amadeus of Lausanne (c. 1110–1159), French Cistercian monk, abbot and Bishop of Lausanne
- Amadeus Pok (died 1267 or 1268), Hungarian prelate and Bishop of Győr
- Amadeus of Portugal (c. 1420–1482), Portuguese noble, monk, Franciscan friar and reformer, founder of a branch of the Friars Minor

=== Other ===
- Amadeus Suropati (born 1985), Indonesian-Australian former footballer

== Fictional characters ==
- Amadeus Arkham, founder of Arkham Asylum in Batman series
- Amadeus Cho, Marvel character
- Amadeus, fictional artificial intelligence from the 2018 anime Steins;Gate 0
- Emperor Amadeus, an otherworldly entity from the fan-made Team Fortress 2 horror series Don't Join Team RED.

== See also ==
- Charles Amadeus, Duke of Nemours (1624–1652), French military leader and magnate
- Victor Amadeus (disambiguation)
