= Freddi =

Freddi is an Italian surname. Notable people with the surname include:

- Amadio Freddi (1570–1634), Italian composer
- Gianluca Freddi, Italian footballer
- Luigi Freddi (1895–1977), Italian journalist and politician

== Fictional characters ==
- Freddi Fish, fictional character in the popular Humongous Entertainment game series of the same name.
- Freddi, the nickname of Frieda, a distant descendant of Fred in the book The Time Warp Trio: 2095

== See also ==
- Freddy (disambiguation)
