= Taganrog Round House =

Building in Taganrog, Russia

Round house
- Круглый дом (Таганрог) (Russian)
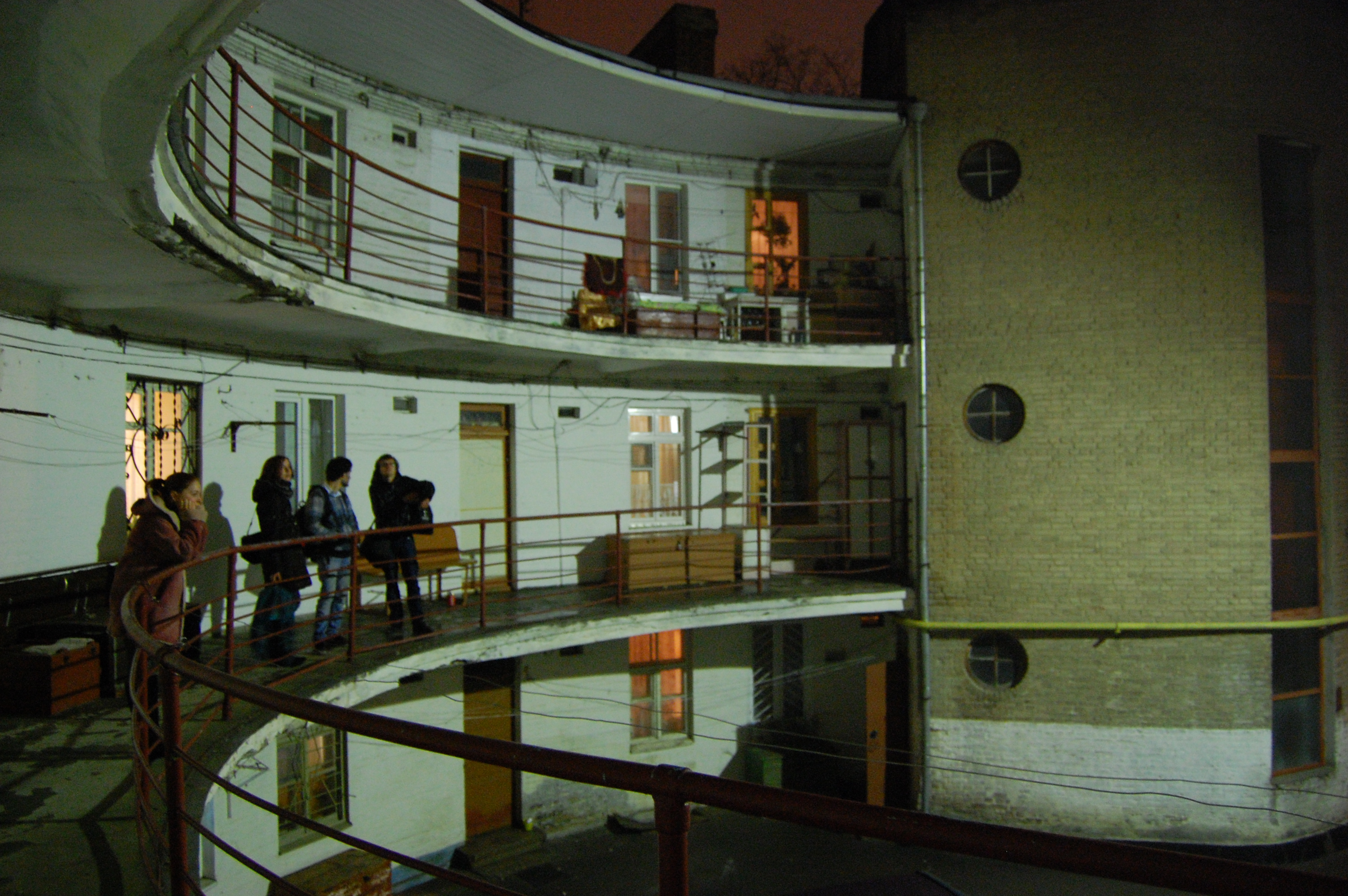
- View of the balconies-galleries inside the round house

- Location within Rostov Oblast Location within Russia
- Type: Fortress and Museum
- Location: 107 Aleksandrovskaya St, Taganrog, Rostov oblast Russia

History
- Built: 1929

Site notes
- Owner: Taranov

The Taganrog Round House is a residential apartment building in Taganrog, and was the first round house built in the USSR. It is located at 107 Aleksandrovskaya St.

== Architect ==
For many years the author of the project of the round house was considered to be an architect Bogolyubov. In the 2000s, when interest in the architectural features of the round house increased, information appeared that it was design by the Rostov architect MN Kondratiev. Later, thanks to the research of the Rostov historian of architecture Arthur Tokarev, it turned out that the architect responsible for the project was Ivan Taranov-Belozerov.

After working at the architectural department of the Kharkov Polytechnic Institute, Taranov-Belozerov later worked in the Southern Machine Building Trust (UMT), which included the Taganrog Boiler Plant. The project was developed in UMT and published for discussion in the eighth issue of the magazine "Construction Industry" in 1929.

== History ==
The round house was built in Taganrog in 1929. This residential house of the factory "Krasny Kotelshchik" is the first round house built in the USSR. It is in the form of a torn ring. Entrance to the yard is directed to the north. The house is experimental, conceived as a symbol of Soviet architecture: a minimum of building materials, maximum strength. The enclosed space of the yard has excellent acoustic properties. The building is built of brick, the windows are horizontally stretched. The ribbon character of the windows was emphasized by the darkish color of the piers.

All apartments of the second and third floors with doors open onto a common balcony encircling these floors. Inside the house is a narrow, perfectly round courtyard. Bathrooms are designed for seven families.

The house was settled by 7 November 1932. The shared toilet was outside the house, about 20 meters from it. Plumbing and sewerage were equipped in the apartments of the house only in the early 1960s.

It was claimed that in two years a similar house was built in Odessa in 1931, but this information is not supported by Odessa sources. In total, four more houses were built in other cities, but such a structure did not receive any propagation.

By the 80th anniversary of the round house in October 2012, major repairs were carried out, and the anniversary itself was marked by a celebration held in the courtyard by the tenants of the house.

== Cultural heritage site ==
In December 2016 it became known that the round house was recognized as "an object of the cultural heritage of the Rostov region". This was issued by the relevant resolution of the Ministry of Culture of the Rostov region. The official name of the facility is "Residential house of the workers of the Krasny Kotelshchik factory". The authoritative international organization "DOCOMOMO-Russia" has acted as the initiator on this issue.

Residents of the house, to the amazement of the public, took the news of the recognition of their home as "an object of cultural heritage" with hostility. As it turned out, the current legislation of the Russian Federation imposes a burden on the maintenance of architectural monuments in full on the owners of the building, that is, in this case, the residents of the house. And these expenses are simply beyond the capacity of the resident s. Residents of the house even turned to the famous Rostov architecture historian Arthur Tokarev, who initiated the recognition of the round house as an object of cultural heritage, with a request to withdraw his application from the Ministry of Culture of the RO.

In December 2017 in Rostov-on-Don, a special meeting of the commission of the organization "Don Heritage" was held, dedicated to the protests of the residents of the house. The delegation of residents took part in the work of the commission.

== Popular culture ==
The foundation of the round house was allegedly built from the foundation stone of the St. Michael the Archangel church, but was destroyed by the decision of the city authorities.

In May 2011 the stage film and actor Aleksandr Shirvindt's TV program "I Want to Know" from Channel One, had as its main subject, the round house, It was aired on 15 August 2011.
