= 5B =

5B or 5-B may refer to:

== Entertainment ==
- Studio 5-B, a 1989 short-lived drama series about a Canadian TV news channel
- 5B (film), a 2018 documentary about the AIDS crisis by Dan Krauss and Paul Haggis
- BFDIA 5b, an episode of Battle for Dream Island which is a game.

== Numbers and computing ==
- 5B is hexadecimal for 91 (number)
- 5B is the ASCII code for "["
  - Thus, %5B is URL encoding for "["

== Space and space exploration ==
- Corot-Exo-5b, an extrasolar planet
- WASP-5b, an extrasolar planet
- Little Joe 5B, an unmanned Launch Escape System test of the Mercury spacecraft

== Other uses ==
- Boron (_{5}B), a chemical element
- 5B, the aircraft registration prefix for Cyprus

== See also ==
- B5 (disambiguation)
