= B5 =

B5, B05, B-5 may refer to:

== Biology ==
- ATC code B05 (Blood substitutes and perfusion solutions), a therapeutic subgroup of the Anatomical Therapeutic Chemical Classification System
- Cytochrome b_{5}, ubiquitous electron transport hemoproteins
  - Cytochrome b5, type A, a human microsomal cytochrome b5
- HLA-B5, an HLA-B serotype
- Pantothenic acid (a.k.a. vitamin B_{5}), a water-soluble vitamin
- Procyanidin B5, a B type proanthocyanidin

== Entertainment ==
- Alekhine's Defence (ECO code B5), a chess opening beginning with the moves e4 Nf6
- B5 (band), an R&B boy band
  - B5 (album), B5's self-titled debut album
- Babylon 5, an American science fiction television series
- The Be Five, a band formed by castmembers of Babylon 5

== Transport ==
- Amadeus (airline) (IATA code: B5), an airline based in Germany (1996–2004)
- B5 and B5 DOHC, models of the Mazda B engine series
- B-5, the manufacturer's model number for the Blackburn Baffin biplane
- B5 platform, the series designator for Audi A4 from 1994 to 2001
- Bundesstraße 5, a German federal highway
- Ceylon Government Railway B5, a steam locomotive class
- Denza B5, a plug-in hybrid mid-size SUV
- HMS B5, a Royal Navy B-class submarine
- Keystone B-5, a light bomber made for the US Army Air Corps in the early 1930s
- Kinner B-5, a popular five cylinder American radial engine of the 1930s
- LNER Class B5, a British class of steam locomotives
- NSB B5 (Class 5), a series of passenger carriages built by Strømmens Værksted for the Norwegian State Railways
- PRR B5, an American 0-6-0 steam locomotive
- SM UB-5, a German Type UB I submarine or U-boat in the German Imperial Navy
- B5 biodiesel

== Other ==
- Baseball5, the five-a-side version of baseball
- B5 Championships, a 2001 fighting game tournament
- %B5, the percent-encoding for the letter μ
- B5, a paper size of the B series defined in ISO 216
- B5, a category of stellar classification
- Bensen B-5, a small rotor kite
- Border Five

== See also ==
- 5B (disambiguation)
- BV (disambiguation)
- Big Five (disambiguation)
