= Amadeu (given name) =

Name list

Amadeu is a Catalan and Portuguese given name derived from the Latin name Amadeus. It may refer to:

== People ==
- Amadeu Amaral (1875–1929), a Brazilian poet, folklorist, philologist and essayist
- Amadeu Altafaj (born 1968), a Spanish journalist
- Amadeu Cristello Nunes da Cunha (born 1966), an Angolan footballer
- Amadeu Fernandes da Silva Sobrinho (born 1990), a Brazilian-born Azerbaijani futsal player
- Amadeu Teixeira (1916–2017), a Brazilian footballer
- Amadeu Vives i Roig (1871–1932), a Spanish musical composer
- Estanislau Amadeu Kreutz (1928–2014), a Brazilian Catholic bishop
- Gésio Amadeu (1947–2020), a Brazilian actor
- José Amadeu dos Santos Mendes (born 1995), a Portugueses footballer

== See also ==
- Amadeo
- Amedeo
