= Amadeus =

Amadeus may refer to:

== People and fictional characters ==
- Amadeus (name), a given name and list of people and fictional characters with the name
- Amadeus (presenter), Italian television and radio presenter Amedeo Umberto Rita Sebastiani (born 1962)
- Amadeus, stage name of Juha Grigori Amadeus Lundberg (born 1989), Finnish singer
- Rambo Amadeus, pseudonym for the Montenegrin singer-songwriter Antonije Pušić

== Arts and entertainment ==
- Amadeus (play), a 1979 stage play by Peter Shaffer
- Amadeus (film), a 1984 film based on the play
- Amadeus (TV series), a television miniseries based on the play
- Amadeus Quartet, a former English string ensemble

== Business ==
- Amadeus, a database developed by Bureau van Dijk of financial and business information on European firms
- Amadeus CRS, a computer reservation system used by airlines and travel agencies
  - Amadeus IT Group, a travel and tourism industry transaction processor and owner of Amadeus CRS
- Amadeus Press, a publishing house, imprint of Rowman & Littlefield
- Amadeus River Cruises, an alternate name of Lüftner Cruises, an Austrian cruise operator
- Amadeus (airline), a former German airline

== Places ==
- Amadeus Basin, a sedimentary basin in Australia
- Lake Amadeus, Northern Territory, Australia

== See also ==
- Eleutherodactylus amadeus, a species of frog
- Amade (name)
- Amadea (disambiguation)
- Amadee (disambiguation)
- Amadeo (disambiguation)
- Amadeu (given name)
- Amédée (disambiguation)
- Amedeo (disambiguation)
