= Amadea =

Amadea may refer to:

== People ==
- Amadea Palaiologina of Monferrato (1418–1440), queen consort and wife of king John II of Cyprus
- Princess Amadea Reuss of Köstritz
- Hon. Miranda Amadea Chaplin (born 1956), daughter of Anthony Chaplin, 3rd Viscount Chaplin
- Amadea Fredonia (1631–1633), daughter of Julius Frederick, Duke of Württemberg-Weiltingen
- Amadea Qureta, a 2018 contestant on The Voice Kids Indonesia (season 3)

=== Fictional characters ===
- Amadea, a version of Cinderella, from The Coachman Rat
- Amadea, a fictional hen from Sauerkraut (TV series)

== Other uses ==
- Amadea (ship), several ships of the name
  - MS Amadea, a cruise ship owned by Amadea Shipping Company and operated by Phoenix Reisen
  - M/Y Amadea, a superyacht built by Lürssen and owned by Russian oligarch Suleyman Kerimov
- Amadea Resort, part of the Prime Plaza Hotels and Resorts in Indonesia

== See also ==
- Amadeus (name), whose feminine form is Amadea
- Amadeans, a Roman Catholic religious order of monks, followers of Amadeus of Portugal
- Amadeus (disambiguation)
- Amadee (disambiguation)
- Amadeo (disambiguation)
- Amédée (disambiguation)
- Amedeo
