= Lucille Wilcox Joullin =

American artist (1876–1924)

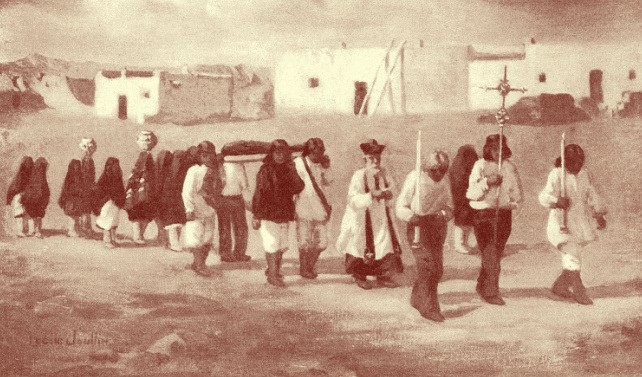
A funeral procession in Isleta in the 1900s featuring Father Anton Docher

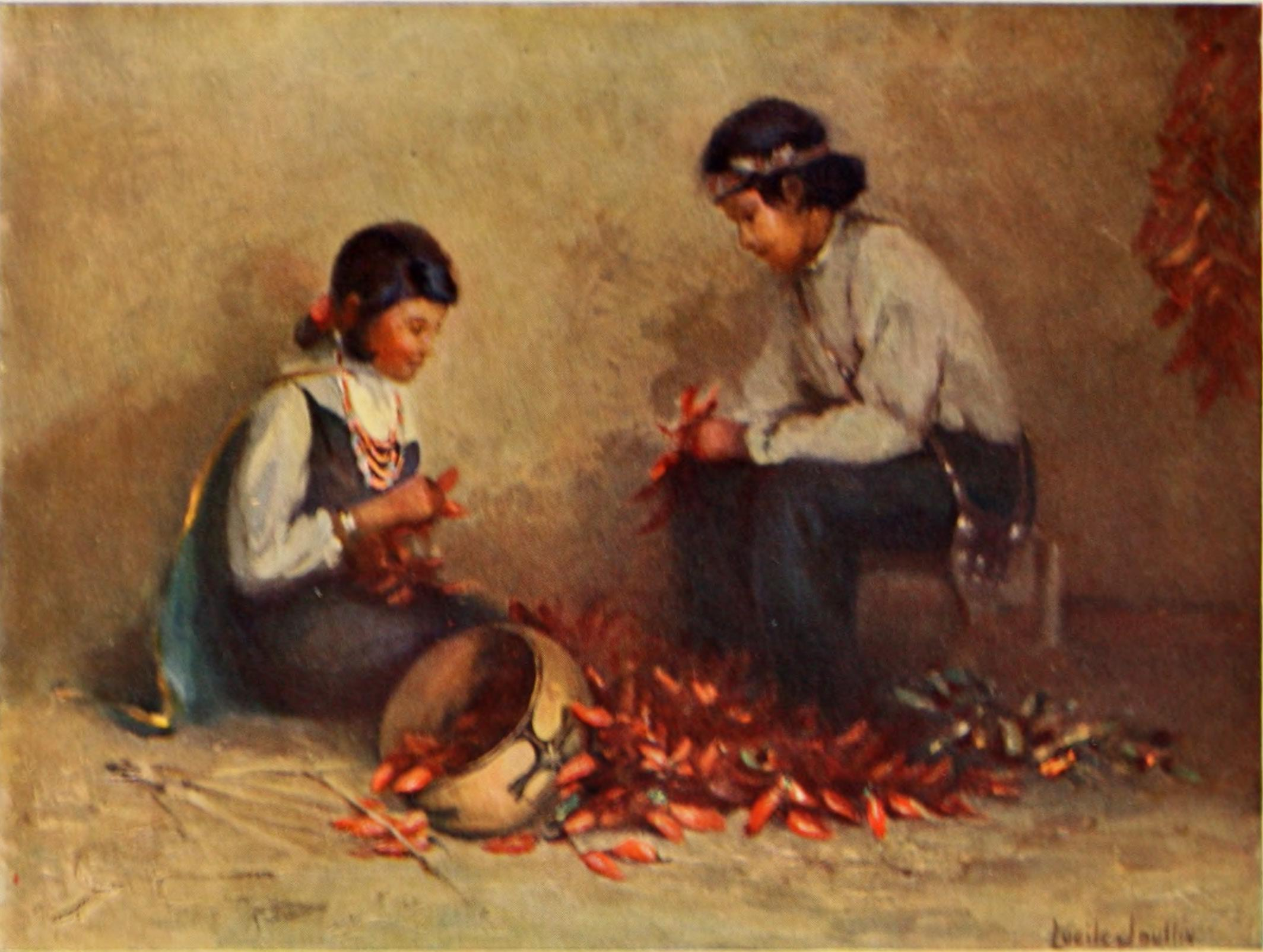
The Pepper Stringers

Lucille Wilcox Joullin (1876–1924) was an American painter known for her landscapes of California and the Pueblo Indians of New Mexico.

== Biography ==
Lucille (or Lucile) Wilcox Joullin was born in Geneseo, Illinois on September 6, 1876. She worked with John Vanderpoel at the Art Institute of Chicago. In 1894, she went to San Francisco. Her first marriage was to artist Jules Mersfelder. Her second was to Amédée Joullin (a painter himself) in 1907. The couple went on an extended honeymoon in Paris, returning to San Francisco in 1909. After the death of her husband in 1917, she married Edward H. Benjamin, a mining engineer, and spent long periods in New Mexico. She lived in San Francisco until her death on June 5, 1924.

== Exhibitions ==
- San Francisco Art Association, 1905.
- Mark Hopkins Institute of Art, 1906.
- Sketch Club (San Francisco), 1906.
- Paris Salon, 1908.
- Rabjohn & Morcom (San Francisco), 1915 (solo).
- Kanst Galleries (Los Angeles), 1923.

== Museum collection ==
- Southwest Museum. Los Angeles.
