= 53rd Infantry Division (France) =

The 53rd Infantry Division (French: 53e Division d'Infanterie, 53e DI) was a French Army formation during World War I and World War II.

== World War 1 ==
During World War I, the division comprised:

- 205th Infantry Regiment
- 224th Infantry Regiment (to August 1916)
- 228th Infantry Regiment (to August 1916)
- 236th Infantry Regiment (to July 1918)
- 319th Infantry Regiment
- 329th Infantry Regiment (to August 1916)
- 25th Territorial Infantry Regiment (from August 1918)

It was part of the French 1st, 2nd, 5th, 9th, 11th, 13th, 20th, 33rd, 35th and 40th Corps, during which it participated in the Battle of Charleroi, the Battle of Guise, the First Battle of the Marne, the First Battle of the Aisne, the Second Battle of Artois, the Second Battle of Champagne, the Battle of the Somme, the Battle of the Lys, the Battle of Matz, and the Meuse-Argonne Offensive.

At various times, it was part of the French First Army, French Second Army, French Third Army, French Fourth Army, French Fifth Army, French Sixth Army, French Seventh Army and French Tenth Army.

== World War 2 ==
During the Battle of France in May 1940, the division contained the following units:

- 208th Infantry Regiment
- 239th Infantry Regiment
- 329th Infantry Regiment
- 66th Reconnaissance Battalion
- 22nd Artillery Regiment
- 222nd Artillery Regiment

It was a Series B Reserve division containing older reservists.

== Commanders ==
=== World War I ===
- Gen. Georges Pierre Louis Perruchon (August 2, 1914 – September 7, 1914)
- Gen. Day (September 7, 1914 – October 18, 1914)
- Div. Gen. Louis Loyzeau de Grandmaison (October 18, 1914 – January 23, 1915)
- Div. Gen. Henri Mathias Berthelot (January 23, 1915 – August 3, 1915)
- Brig. Gen. Joseph Alfred Micheler (August 3, 1915 – March 25, 1916)
- Gen. Georges Pierre Louis Lebouc (March 25, 1916 – January 15, 1917)
- Div. Gen. Henri André Mesplé (January 15, 1917 – April 5, 1917)
- Div. Gen. Amédée Henri Guillemin (April 5, 1917 – February 20, 1919)

=== World War II ===
- Gen. Louis Emile Charles Henri Blin (September 11, 1939 – January 6, 1940)
- Gen. Jean-Marie Léon Etcheberrigaray (January 6, 1940 – June 25, 1940)
