= CoRoT-5b =

Hot Jupiter

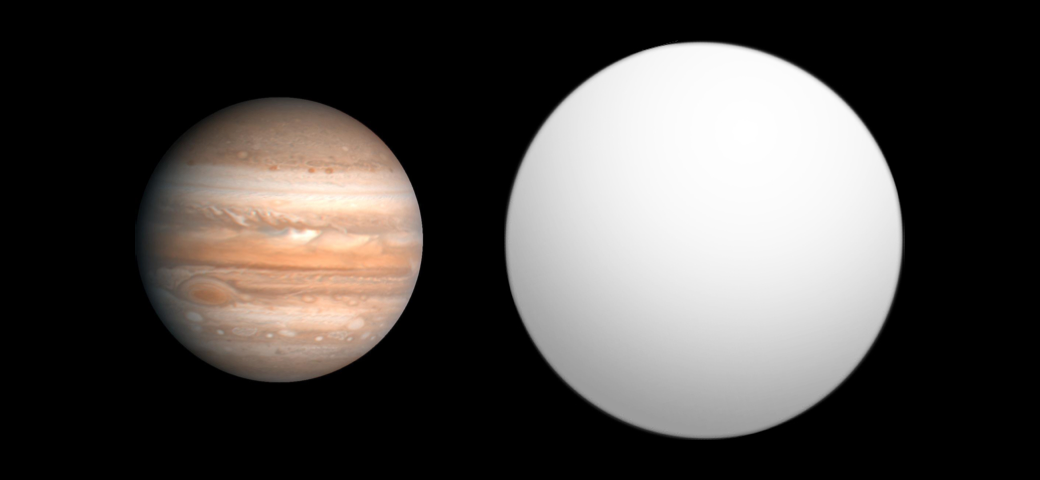
- Size comparison of CoRoT-5b with Jupiter.

Discovery
- Discovered by: CoRoT mission
- Discovery site: Earth orbit
- Discovery date: 2008
- Detection method: Transit method

Orbital characteristics
- Semi-major axis: 0.0495 AU (7,410,000 km)
- Eccentricity: 0.09
- Orbital period (sidereal): 4.03789 d
- Star: CoRoT-5

Physical characteristics
- Mean radius: 1.388^{+0.046}_{−0.047} R_{J}
- Mass: 0.467^{+0.047}_{−0.024} M_{J}
- Mean density: 0.217 g/cm^{3}

CoRoT-5b (previously named CoRoT-Exo-5b) is an extrasolar planet orbiting the F-type star CoRoT-5. It was first reported by the CoRoT mission team in 2008 using the transit method. This planet has been confirmed by a Doppler follow-up study.

== Properties and location ==
This planetary object is reported to be about half the mass of Jupiter but slightly larger in terms of radius at 0.467 M_{J} and 1.388 R_{J}.

== See also ==
- CoRoT-6b
