= CoRoT-6 =

Star in the constellation Ophiuchus

Observation data Epoch J2000 Equinox ICRS
- Constellation: Ophiuchus
- Right ascension: 18^{h} 44^{m} 17.4079^{s}
- Declination: +06° 39′ 47.513″
- Apparent magnitude (V): 13.9

Characteristics
- Evolutionary stage: main sequence
- Spectral type: F5V

Astrometry
Proper motion (μ)	RA: 5.438±0.017 mas/yr Dec.: 1.889±0.016 mas/yr
Parallax (π)	1.5641±0.0163 mas
Distance	2,090 ± 20 ly (639 ± 7 pc)

Details
Mass	1.1 M_{☉}
Radius	1.02 R_{☉}
Luminosity	1.4 L_{☉}
Surface gravity (log g)	428 cgs
Temperature	5,922 K
Metallicity [Fe/H]	−0.20 dex
Rotational velocity (v sin i)	7.5 km/s
Age	4.9 Gyr

Other designations
- CoRoT-Exo-6

Database references
SIMBAD	data
Exoplanet Archive	data

CoRoT-6 is a magnitude 13.9 star located in the constellation Ophiuchus.

== Location and properties ==
The star has a radius of about 102% of the Sun and a mass of about 110% of the Sun. It is a main sequence F type star a little larger and hotter than the Sun.

== Planetary system ==
The star is orbited by one known extrasolar planet identified as CoRoT-6b. The discovery was made by the CoRoT program using the transit method.

The CoRoT-6 planetary system
Companion (in order from star)	Mass	Semimajor axis (AU)	Orbital period (days)	Eccentricity	Inclination (°)	Radius
b	2.96 M_{J}	0.0855	8.887	< 0.1	—	1.166 R_{J}
