= CoRoT-5 =

Star in the constellation Monoceros

Observation data Epoch J2000 Equinox ICRS
- Constellation: Monoceros
- Right ascension: 06^{h} 45^{m} 06.5407^{s}
- Declination: +00° 48′ 54.906″
- Apparent magnitude (V): 14.0

Characteristics
- Evolutionary stage: main sequence
- Spectral type: F9V

Astrometry
Proper motion (μ)	RA: −3.040 mas/yr Dec.: −8.205 mas/yr
Parallax (π)	1.1535±0.0188 mas
Distance	2,830 ± 50 ly (870 ± 10 pc)

Details
Mass	1.12 M_{☉}
Radius	1.1 R_{☉}
Luminosity	1.7 L_{☉}
Surface gravity (log g)	4.33 cgs
Temperature	6,190 K
Metallicity [Fe/H]	0.04 dex
Rotation	4.03 days
Rotational velocity (v sin i)	3.82 km/s
Age	1.7 Gyr

Other designations
- CoRoT-Exo-5, 2MASS J06450653+0048548

Database references
SIMBAD	data

CoRoT-5 is a magnitude 14 star located in the constellation Monoceros.

== Location and properties ==
CoRoT-5 is located within the LRa01 field of view of the CoRoT spacecraft, in the constellation Monoceros. It is an F-type main-sequence star with a radius of about 116% of the Sun's and a mass of about 101% of the Sun.

== Planetary system ==
A single planet, CoRoT-5b, has been detected using the astronomical transit method by the CoRoT program.

The CoRoT-5 planetary system
Companion (in order from star)	Mass	Semimajor axis (AU)	Orbital period (days)	Eccentricity	Inclination (°)	Radius
b	0.459 M_{J}	0.0495	4.0384	0.09	—	1.28 R_{J}
