= Matilda Vanderpoel =

American painter

- Born: April 20, 1862; Haarlemmermeer, The Netherlands
- Died: October 21, 1950 (aged 62); Chicago, Illinois
- Known for: Painting, Educator

Matilda Vanderpoel (1862-1950) was an American painter. She was known for her landscapes and portraits.

== Biography ==
Vanderpoel was born on April 20, 1862, in Haarlemmermeer, The Netherlands. She attended the School of the Art Institute of Chicago where she was taught by her brother John Vanderpoel. She graduated in 1891.

Vanderpoel exhibited her work at the Illinois Building at the 1893 World's Columbian Exposition in Chicago, Illinois.

In 1898 Vanderpoel accepted a position teaching art at the Colorado Chautauqua in Boulder, Colorado. She spent her summers in the town of Gold Hill, Colorado, for several decades.

In 1909 she began teaching at the School of the Art Institute of Chicago, where her brother John was serving as director. One of her student at the Art Institute was Georgia O'Keeffe Also in 1909 she established, with her friend, the artist Jean Sherwood, the "Holiday House Association" in Boulder, to "conserve the health of tired working women". First they built a dwelling called the Blue Bird Cottage near the site of the Colorado Chautauqua. In 1921 they expanded into the town of Gold Hill where they converted an hotel into the Blue Bird Lodge. The Blue Bird Lodge served as a vacation spot for Chicago's working-class women, providing a respite from the city. The lodge was sold in 1962 by the Holiday House Association, but the building continues to function as an hotel.

In 1923 Vanderpoel and other members of her family bought their own cabin in Gold Hill named "Sunset View". The same year her painting "Morning in the Rockies" was exhibited at the Art Institute of Chicago.

She died on October 21, 1950, in Chicago.
