= Amadeusz =

Amadeusz is a Polish-language version of the given name Amadeus. Notable people with the name include:

- Amadeusz Kłodawski (born 1987), Polish footballer
- Amadeusz Skrzyniarz (born 1994), Polish footballer
