= Amadeo =

Amadeo is a Spanish name derived from the Latin theophoric name Amadeus. It may refer to:

== People ==
- Amadeo I of Spain (1845–1890)
- Amadeo Barletta Barletta, Italian businessman in the Caribbean
- Amadeo Bordiga (1889–1970), founder of the Communist Party of Italy
- Amadeo Flores Carcagno, Peruvian defense minister
- Amadeo Giannini, co-founder of the Bank of America
- Amadeo Labarta (1905–1989), Spanish footballer
- Amadeo Marco Ilincheta (1900–1987), Spanish politician
- Amadeo Trinchitella (died 2005), American political organizer
- Amadeo (surname)
  - Giovanni Antonio Amadeo, Italian sculptor
  - Mario Amadeo (1911–1983), Argentine politician, diplomat and writer
  - Mike Amadeo, American musician and composer
  - Roberta Amadeo (born 1970), Italian para-cyclist
  - Sol Amadeo (born 1996), Uruguayan field hockey player

== Other ==
- Amadeo (Austrian record label)
- Amadeo, Cavite, a municipality in Cavite, Philippines
- Casa Amadeo, antigua Casa Hernandez, an historic Latin music store in New York City

== See also ==
- Amadea (disambiguation)
- Amadee (disambiguation)
- Amédée (disambiguation)
- Amadeus (disambiguation)
- Amadeu (given name), the Catalan and Portuguese variant of the name
- Amedeo, the Italian form of the name
