= John Vanderpoel =

Dutch-American artist and teacher (1857-1911)

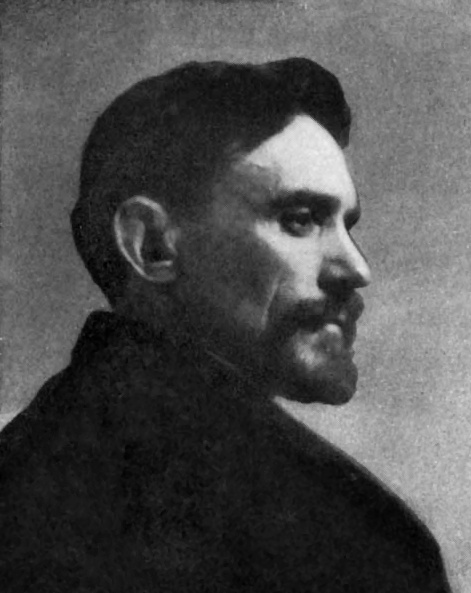
John Vanderpoel

John Henry Vanderpoel (November 15, 1857 – May 2, 1911), born Johannes (Jan) van der Poel, was a Dutch-American artist and teacher, best known as an instructor of figure drawing. His book The Human Figure, a standard art school resource featuring numerous drawings based on his teaching at the School of the Art Institute of Chicago, was published in 1907.

== Life and work ==
Vanderpoel was born in the Haarlemmermeer, Netherlands, the seventh of ten children. His mother died in 1867, and in 1869 he emigrated with his father and siblings to the United States. He studied at the Chicago Academy of Design, which later became the School of the Art Institute of Chicago. In 1886, he went to Europe, studying for two years at Académie Julian in Paris with Gustave Boulanger and Jules Lefebvre.

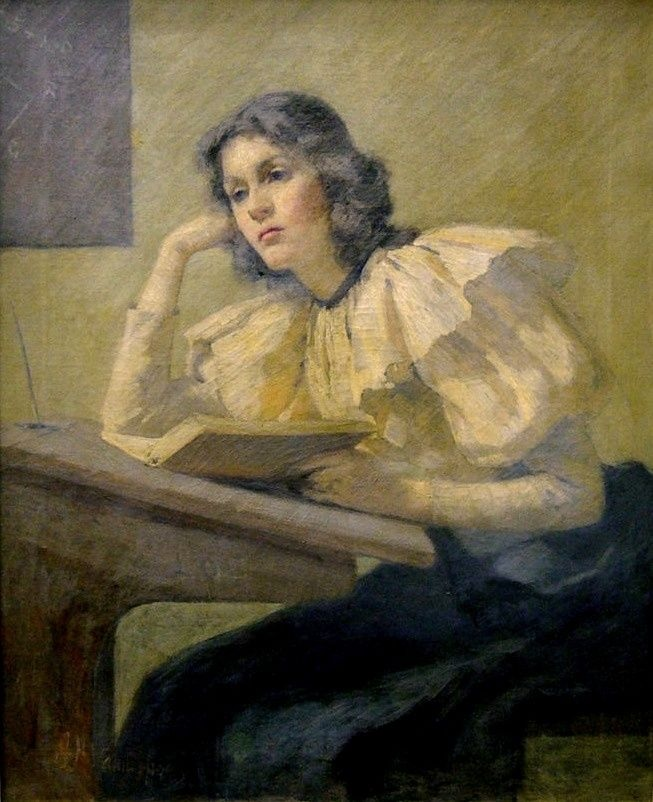
The Perplexing Problem by John Vanderpoel

Vanderpoel exhibited five paintings at the World's Columbian Exposition in Chicago in 1893, was a member of several artists' societies, and was elected president of the Chicago Society of Artists. He received a bronze medal at the Louisiana Purchase Exposition of 1904 in St. Louis. He worked with Lucille Wilcox Joullin during his stay in Chicago. Vanderpoel also created murals, including one on the ceiling of a theater at DePaul University and a sixty-foot painting at a Los Angeles hotel. In spite of his successes as a muralist and easel painter, Vanderpoel was better known as an instructor at the Art Institute, where he taught from 1880 until 1910. He was an influential teacher who adhered to the beaux-arts tradition while denouncing modernism. Among Vanderpoel's many students were artists J. C. Leyendecker, Frederick Carl Frieseke, and Georgia O'Keeffe, who wrote in her autobiography that Vanderpoel was "one of the few real teachers I have known." Vanderpoel's younger sister Matilda, an artist who, like him, had attended and then taught at the Art Institute, also had O'Keeffe as a student.

Vanderpoel had developed a reputation as one of America's foremost authorities on figure drawing. His book The Human Figure, published in 1907, featured many of his pencil and charcoal drawings, and became a standard textbook for art school students. George Bridgman wrote in a foreword included in some editions of the book: "[Vanderpoel's] insight into nature was the result of a lifetime of earnest, patient and persistent study. He analyzed and recorded the human figure both in mass and detail; in good taste and discriminating judgment, with a closeness to nature that has never been equaled. The features ... will always remain a masterpiece in art. ... Mr. Vanderpoel has left behind him a great and powerful influence."

In 1910, Vanderpoel moved to St. Louis, accepting an offer from Edward Gardner Lewis to join the faculty of People's University as head of the Art Academy's drawing and painting department. He died in St. Louis on May 2, 1911, of heart disease, and was survived by his widow and two children. Two years after his death, the Vanderpoel Memorial Art Galleries were established in Chicago's Beverly Hills neighborhood. The collection features works by Vanderpoel, including drawings that were published in The Human Figure, as well as those of other artists associated with Chicago. The collection now numbers over five hundred pieces. A street and an elementary school in Chicago are also named in his honor.

== Drawings ==
Some of Vanderpoel's drawings included in The Human Figure:

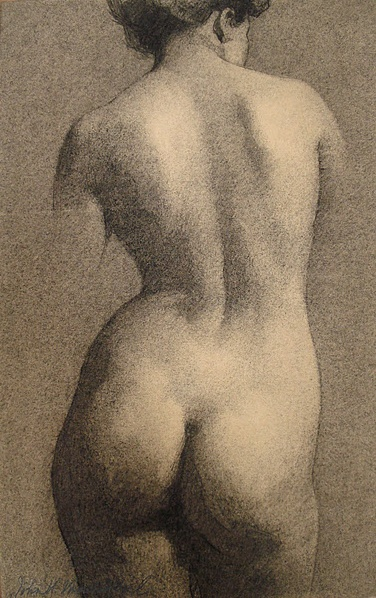

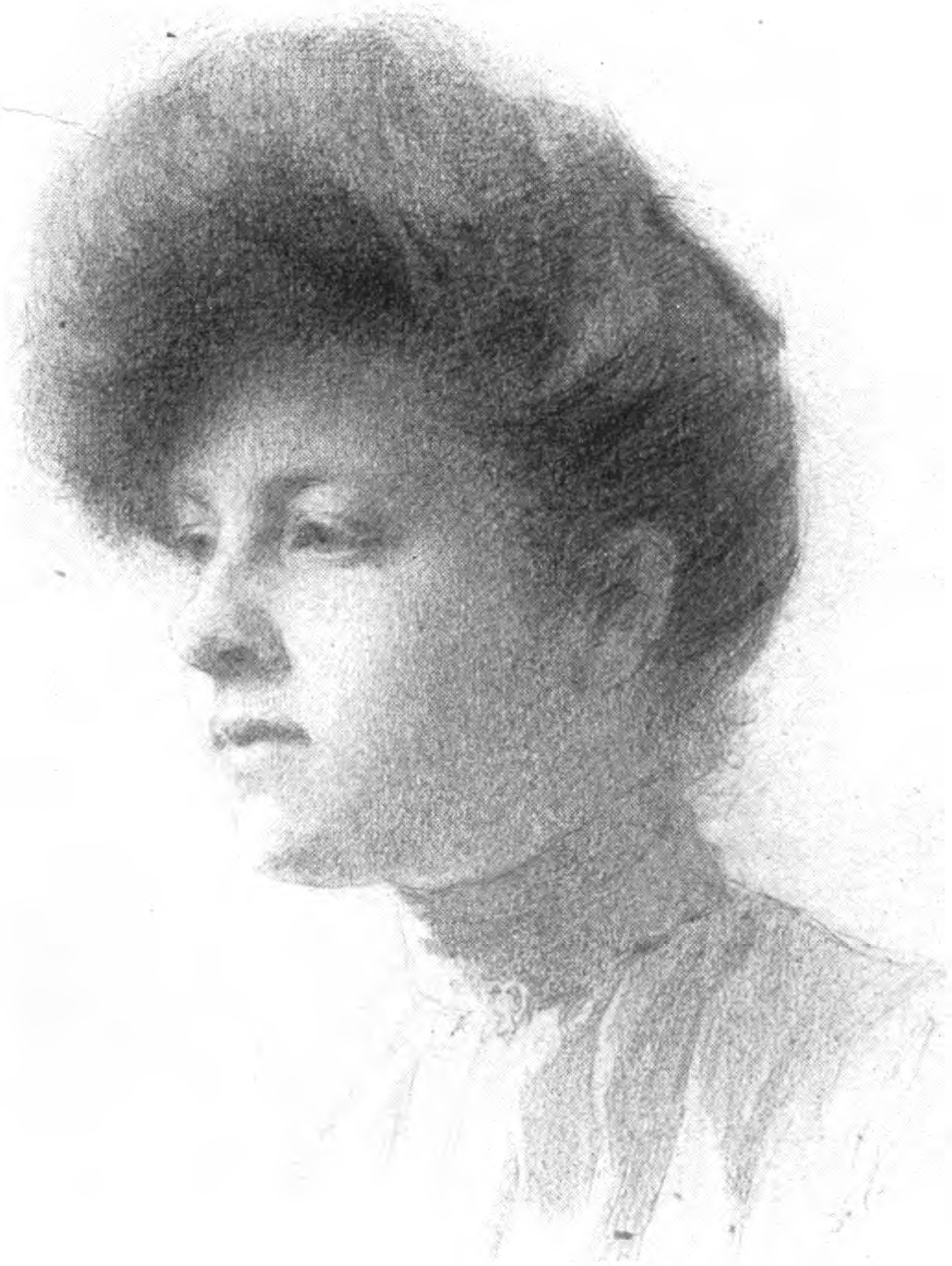

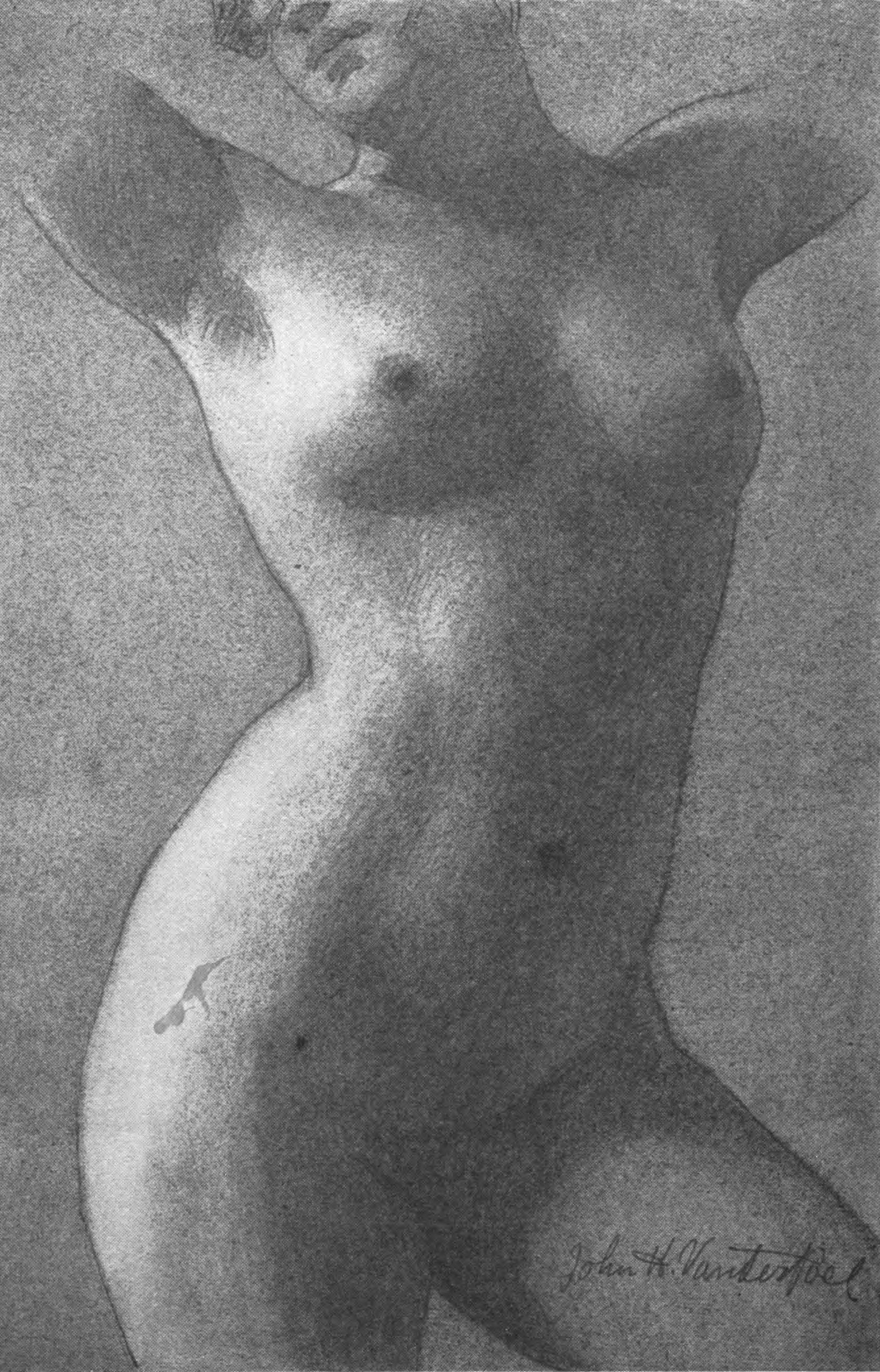

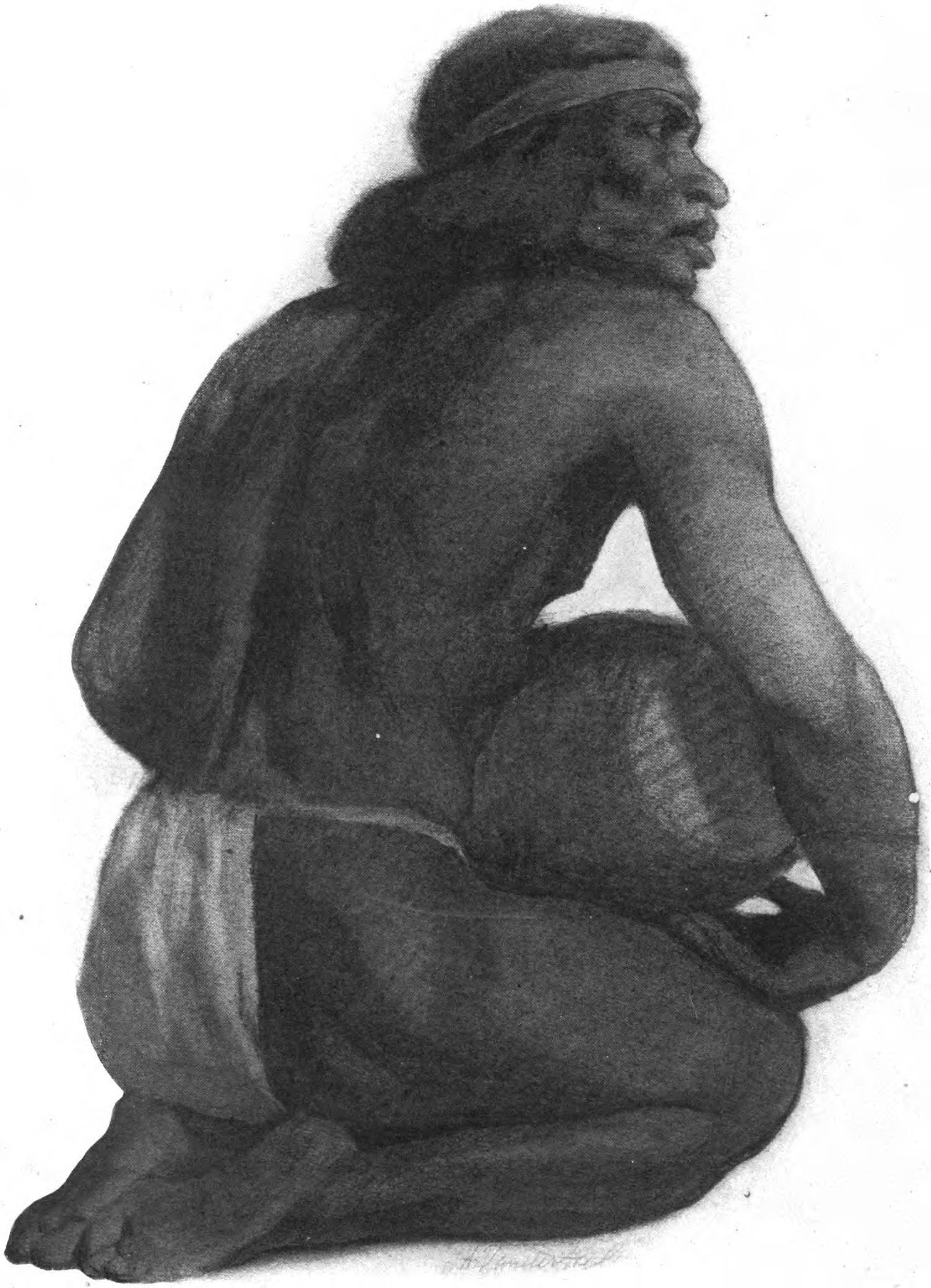

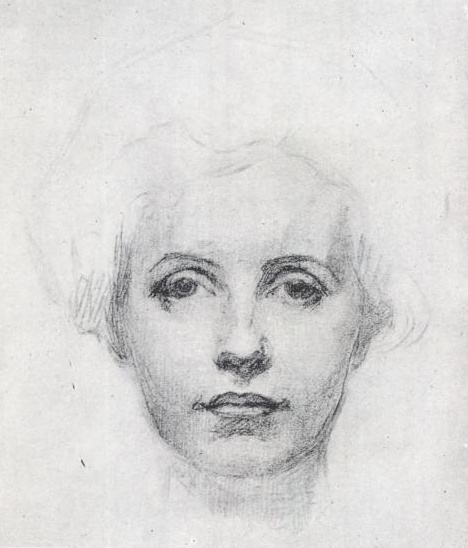

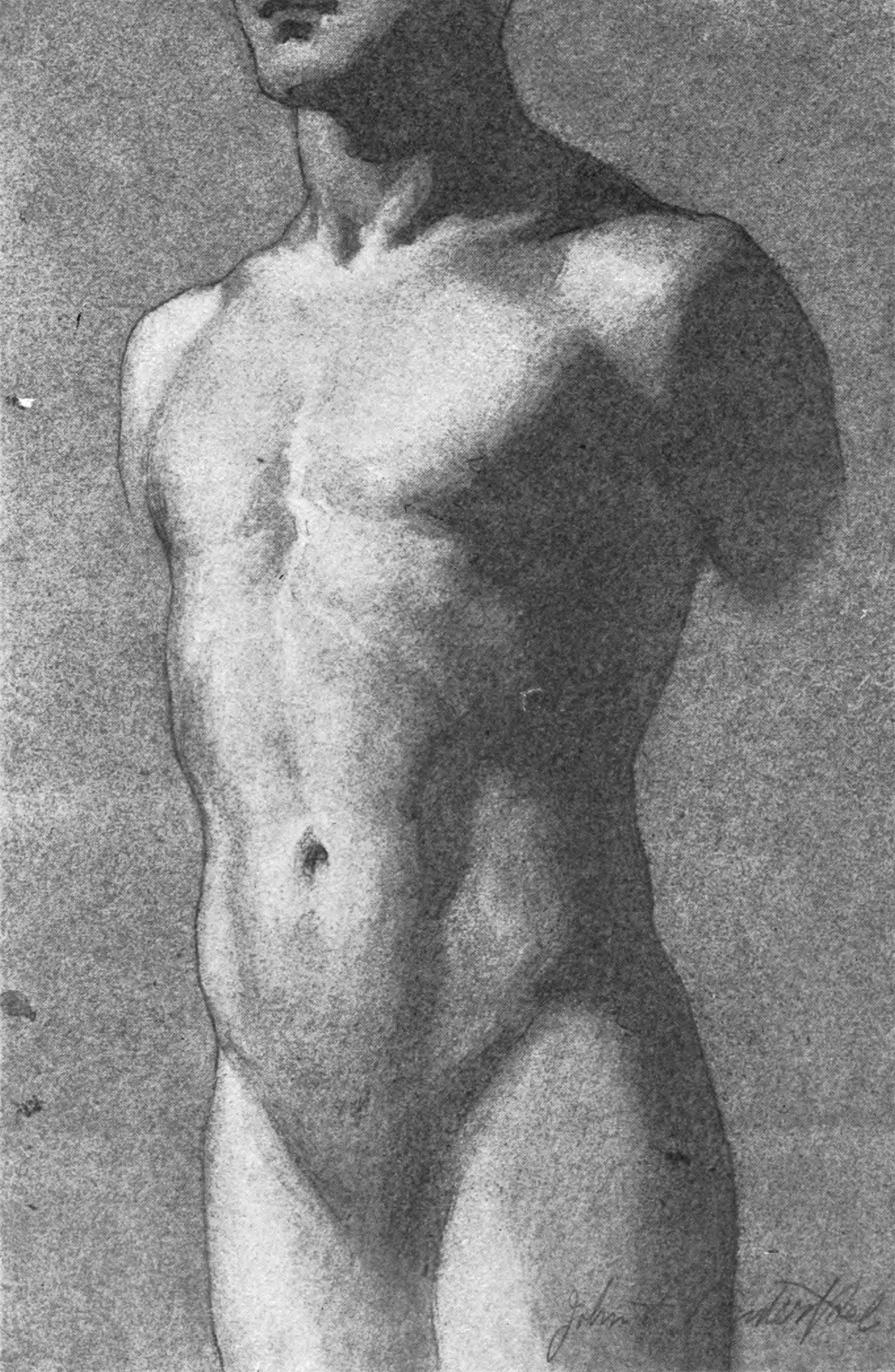

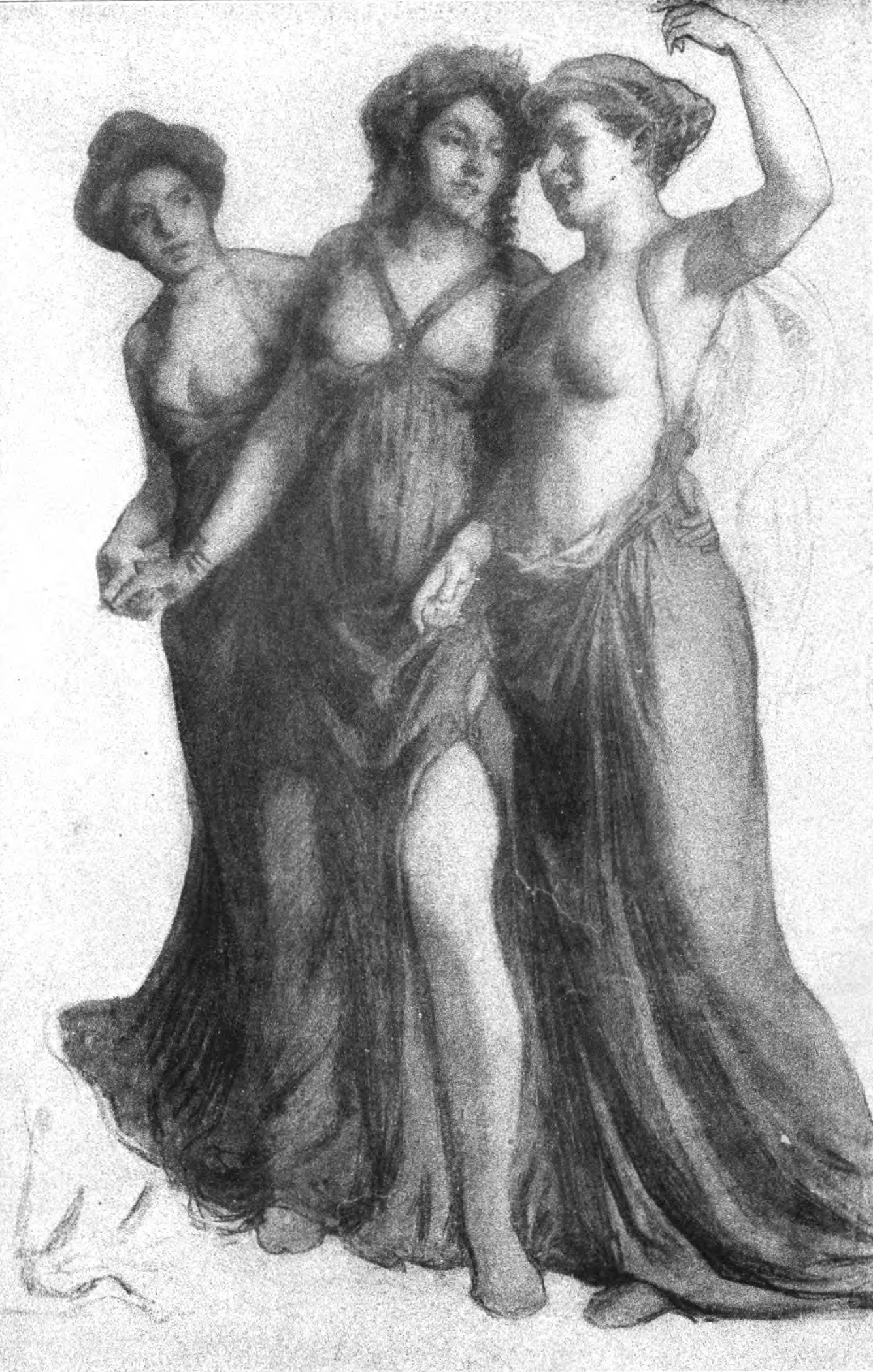

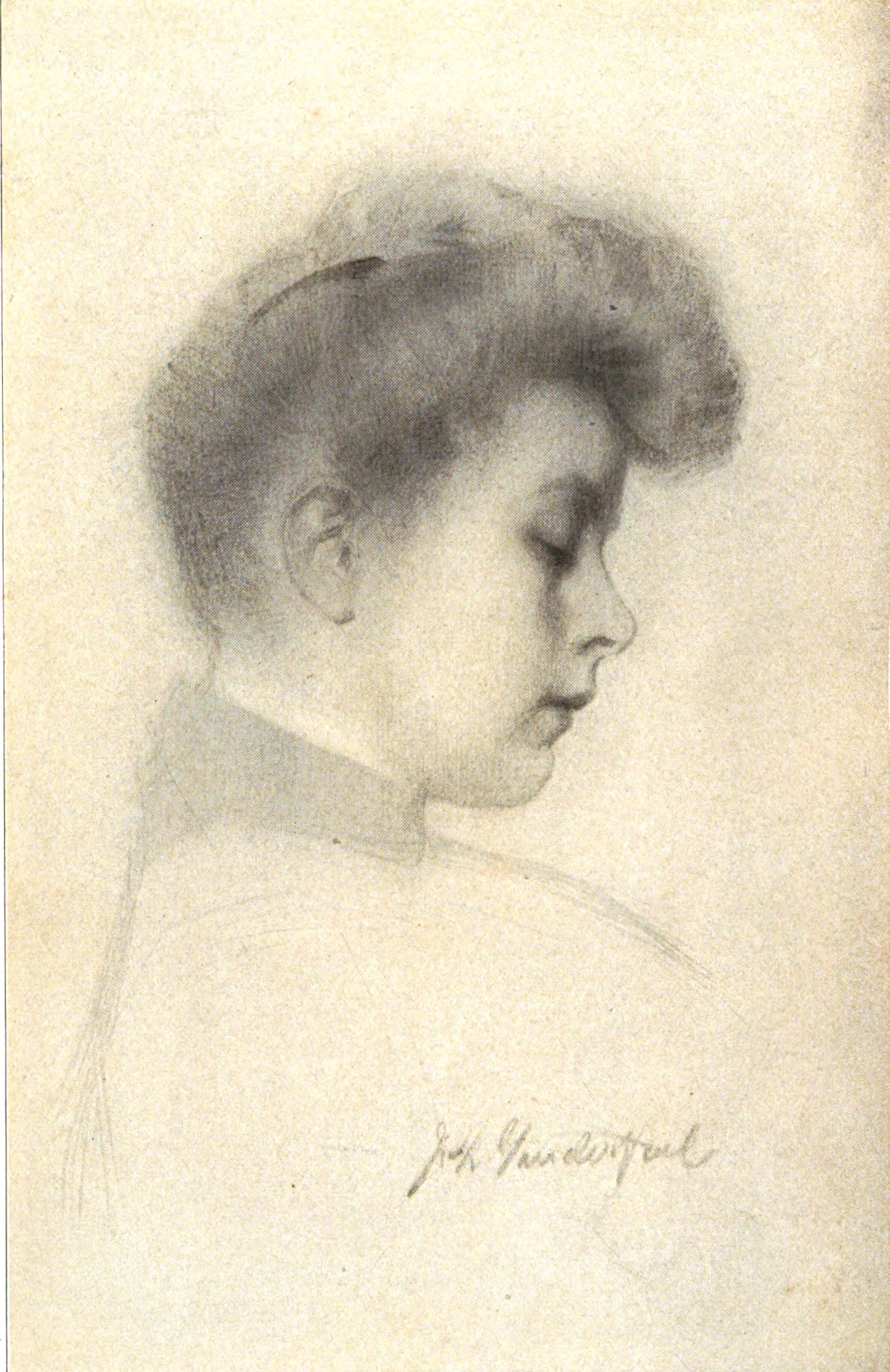

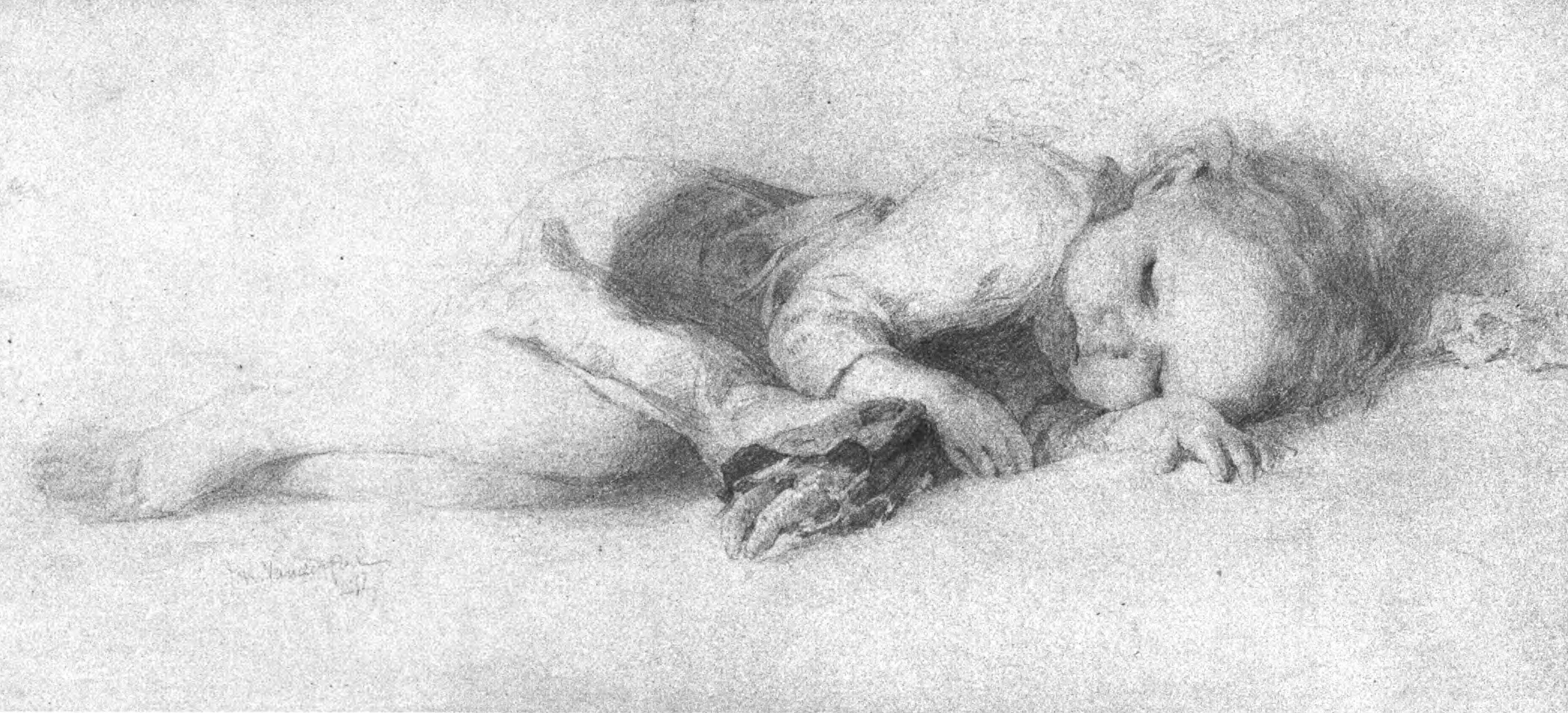

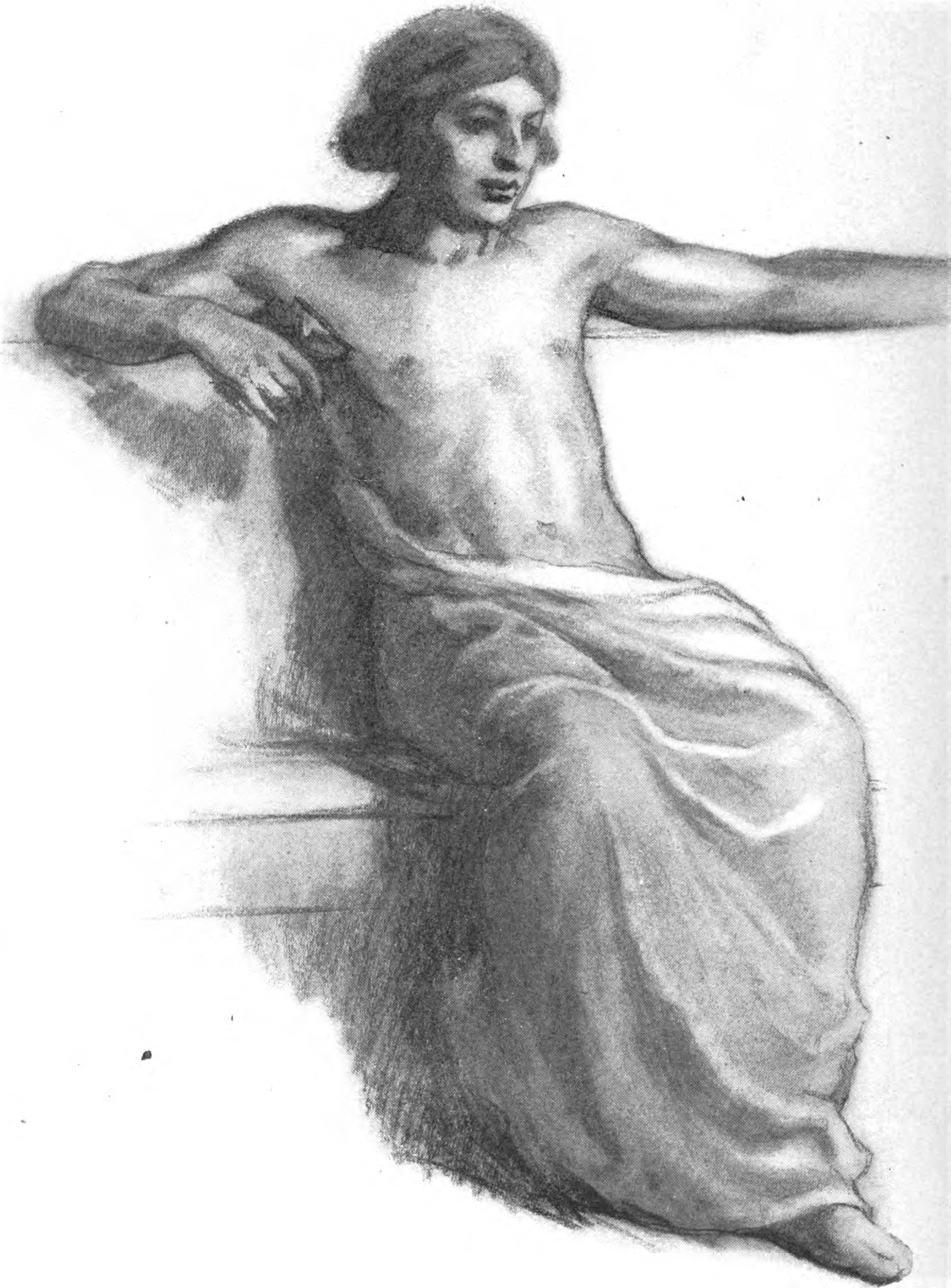

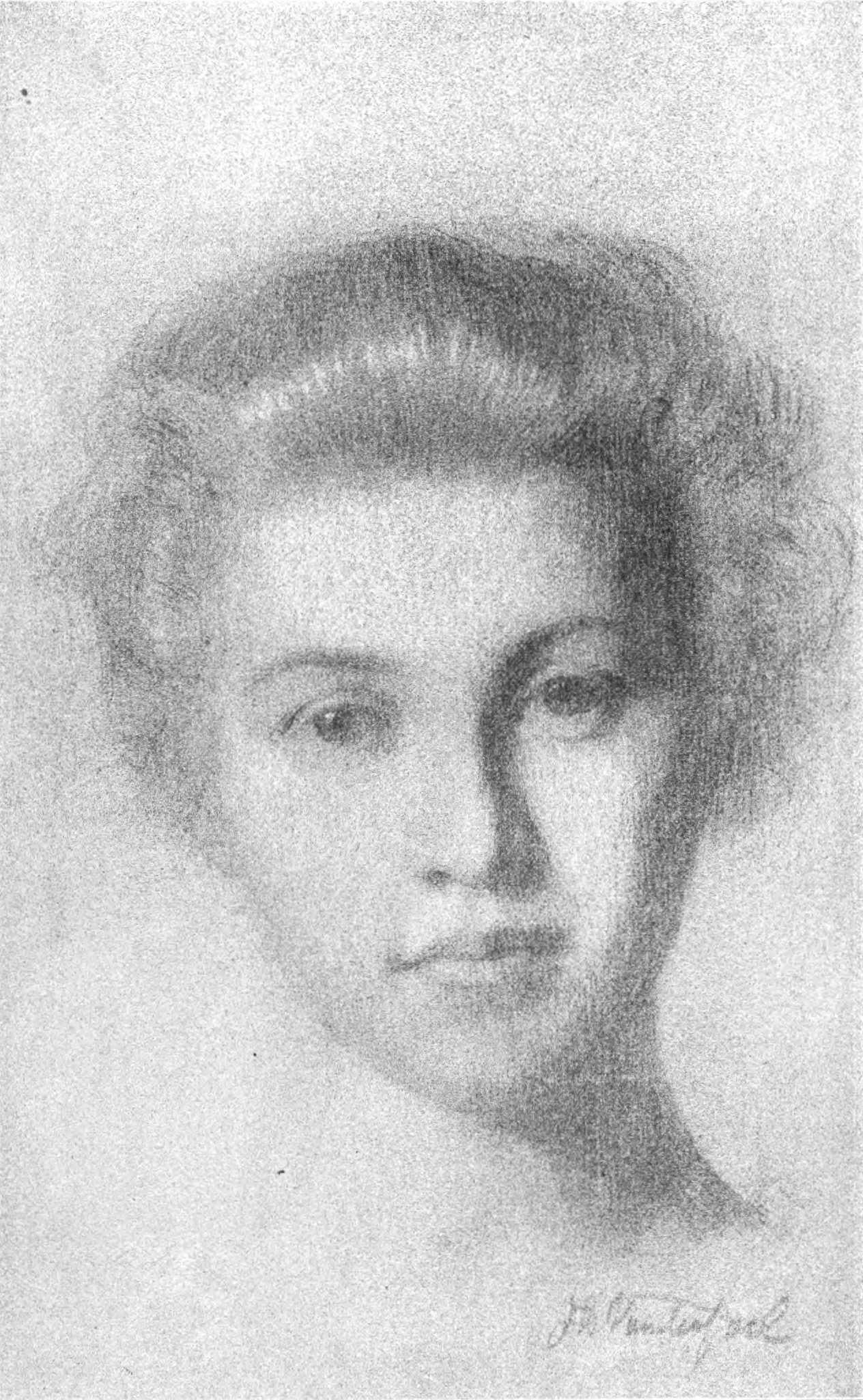

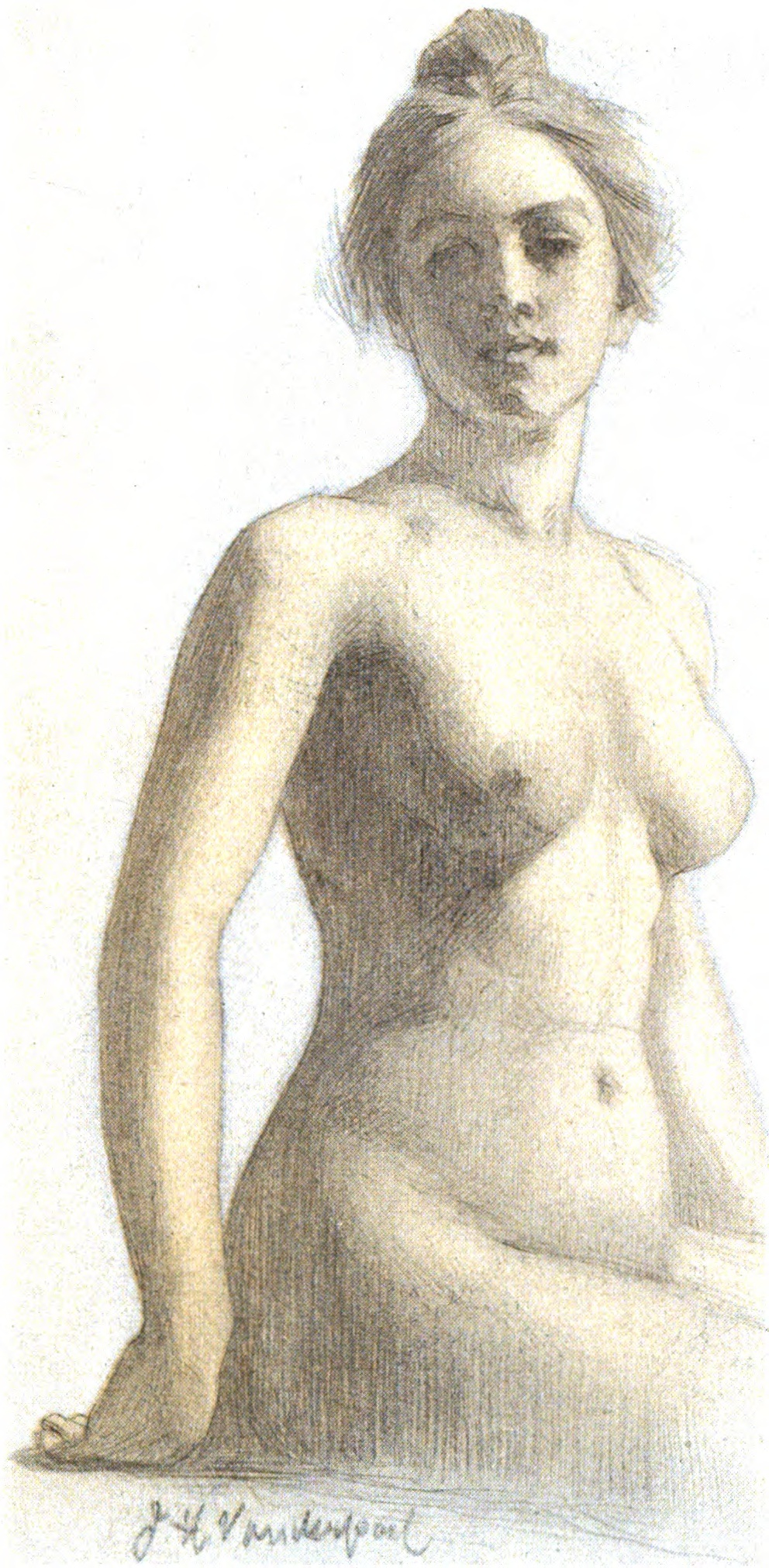

== Publications ==
- Vanderpoel, John Henry (1907). The Human Figure (1908, second ed.). Chicago: Inland Printer Company. Full text available online. Full text of fourth edition (1911) also available, from archive.org.

== See also ==
- Belle Silveira
