= BV =

BV, B.V., Bv, bV, or bv may refer to:

== In arts and entertainment ==
- Backing vocal, in music, a vocal harmony with the lead vocalist provided by one or more backing vocalists
- Busoni-Verzeichnis, a catalogue of compositions by Ferruccio Busoni

== Companies and organizations ==
- Beaulieu Vineyard, a Napa Valley winery
- Besloten vennootschap, a type of Dutch or Belgian private limited liability company. Dutch for "private company", similar to the American concept of a limited liability company.
- Bicycle Victoria, an Australian bicycle advocacy organisation
- Black & Veatch, a U.S.-based engineering, consulting and construction company
- Blue Panorama Airlines (IATA airline designator)
- Bottega Veneta, a manufacturer of luxury leather goods
- Bureau Veritas, a testing, inspection, and certification company (stock symbol BV)

== Science and medicine ==
=== Biology and medicine ===
- Bacterial vaginosis, the most common cause of vaginal infection
- Belch Vocalizations, the most common form of intra-group communication among the mountain gorilla
- Biological value, a measure of the proportion of absorbed protein from a food which becomes incorporated into the proteins of the organism's body
- Binocular vision, vision in which both eyes are used together
- Blood vessel, part of the circulatory system that transports blood throughout the body
- Biovar, a rank below species often written as bv.

=== Mathematics and computing ===
- Batalin–Vilkovisky formalism, a concept in mathematical physics to construct gauge theories
- Bounded variation, a concept in mathematical analysis
- Bounding volume, in computer graphics and computational geometry, a closed volume that completely contains the union of objects in the set

=== Other uses in science and technology ===
- Bavarian B V, early German 2-4-0 type of locomotive of the Royal Bavarian State Railways
- Bed volume, the volume of material in a vessel (e.g. of a catalyst in a vessel, or stationary phase in column chromatography)
- Boiling vessel, equipment provided to an armoured vehicle for heating food or water (chiefly British)
- Breakdown voltage, the minimum voltage that causes an insulator to become electrically conductive
- Lohner B.V, a variant of the Lohner B.II military reconnaissance aircraft

== Language ==
- Voiced labiodental affricate (⟨b̪͡v⟩, ⟨b̪͜v⟩, or ⟨b̪v⟩), a type of consonant sound

== Places ==
- Bella Vista, Arkansas
- Bouvet Island, an uninhabited South Atlantic sub-Antarctic volcanic island
  - .bv, the inactive ccTLD for Bouvet Island

== Other uses ==
- Blessed Virgin Mary (Roman Catholic), Mary, mother of Jesus, as venerated in the Roman Catholic Church
- Book value, in accounting, the value of an asset according to its balance sheet account balance
- Bronze Star Medal with Valor
- Bysshe Vanolis, pen-name of Scottish poet James Thomson
- Swiss Federal Constitution, abbreviated as BV for its German name Bundesverfassung der Schweizerischen Eidgenossenschaft

== See also ==
- B5 (disambiguation)
- Buena Vista (disambiguation)
