= Victor Amadeus =

Victor Amadeus may refer to:

- Victor Amadeus I, Duke of Savoy (1587–1637)
- Victor Amadeus II, King of Sardinia (1666–1732) grandson of the above
- Victor Amadeus III, King of Sardinia (1726–1796), grandson of the above
- Victor Amadeus, Prince of Piedmont (1699–1715), son of Victor Amadeus II
- Victor Amadeus I, Prince of Carignan (1690–1741), son in law of Victor Amadeus II
- Victor Amadeus II, Prince of Carignan (1743–1780), grandson of the above
- Victor Amadeus, Landgrave of Hesse-Rotenburg (1779–1834)
- Victor Amadeus of Anhalt-Bernburg-Schaumburg-Hoym (1744–1790)
- Victor Amadeus, Prince of Anhalt-Bernburg (1634–1718)
