= Prime Plaza Hotels and Resorts =

Indonesian hotel chain

Prime Plaza Hotels & Resorts
- Company type: Private
- Industry: Hotel, tourism
- Founded: 2003
- Number of locations: 14
- Parent: Prime Plaza Hotel Resort Group
- Website: www.pphotels.com

Prime Plaza Hotels & Resorts is hotel chain which is headquartered in Jakarta, Indonesia. The company was founded in 2003.

In some instances the establishment of the chain was based upon the re-branding of former Raddison properties.

The company operates a hotel and resort chain, with brand names such as Prime Plaza, Prime Biz and Prime resort in many locations across the Indonesian archipelago.

== Properties ==
- Prime Plaza Hotel Kualanamu Medan
- Prime Plaza Hotel Purwakarta
- Prime Plaza Hotel Sanur Bali
- Prime Plaza Hotel Jogjakarta
- Sanur Paradise Plaza Suites
- Sanur Paradise Plaza Hotel
- Amadea Resort & Villas Seminyak Bali
- Gili Eco Villas
- Bali Dynasty Resort Kuta
- Menjangan Dynasty Resort Bali
- PrimeBiz Surabaya
- PrimeBiz Cikarang
- PrimeBiz Karawang
- PrimeBiz Tegal
- PrimeBiz Dan Mogot Jakarta
