= Amédée (disambiguation) =

Amédée is a given name of French origin.

Amédée or Amedee or variation, may also refer to:

== Places ==
- Amedee Army Airfield, a military use airport in Herlong, California, United States
- Amédée Island, New Caledonia; an island with the Amédée Lighthouse
- Amédée Lake (Baie-Comeau), in Baie-Comeau, Quebec, Canada
- Amédée Lighthouse, an iron lighthouse located on Amédée Island, New Caledonia
- Amédée River, a tributary of the Saint Lawrence River in Baie-Comeau, Quebec, Canada
- 14012 Amedee, a minor planet

== People with the surname ==
- Beryl Amedee, American politician in the Louisiana House of Representatives
- Lynn Amedee (born 1941), American football player and coach

== Other uses ==
- Amédée, or How to Get Rid of It, a 1954 play by Eugène Ionesco
- Amédée, a 1950 French film

== See also ==
- Amade (name)
- Amadea (disambiguation)
- Amadee (disambiguation)
- Amedeo (disambiguation)
- Amadeus (disambiguation)
