= Terpsimbrotos =

Type of linguistic compound

Terpsimbrotos is a type of linguistic compound (inflectional verbal compounds, German verbales Rektionskompositum) where the first part ends in -ti or -si in Greek or Sanskrit. It is on a par with the bahuvrihi and tatpurusha types. It is derived from a finite verbal phrase, the verbal inflection still visible at the juncture of the compound members. Terpsimbrotos (τερψίμβροτος) is itself a Greek example of such a compound, consisting of terpsi (either from terp-ti- or from terp-si-) "gladdens" and mbrotos "mortals" (cf. ἀμβροσία [a-mbrosia]); a terpsimbrotos is thus something or somebody that "gladdens mortals". The word appears in the Odyssey and in the Homeric hymn to Apollo as an epitheton of Helios.

Opinions as to what form exactly is reflected by this type of compound are divided. Dunkel (1992) compares the Vedic -si- imperatives, connected with the aorist system, apparently by haplology along the lines of vak-sa-si > vaksi.

Bē-t-harmōn (βητάρμων) "driving the wheel", a Homeric compound, was also postulated as a similar type of compound, though lacking the -i- of terpsimbrotos. If correctly analysed, this would support the -ti- analysis of terpsi-. Dunkel traces the origin of the pt- in πτόλεμος [ptolemos] (vs. earlier πόλεμος [polemos]) "war" to a re-analysis of such a compound, *phere-t-polemos, metathesised to φερεπτόλεμος [phere-ptolemos].

Phere-oikos (φερέοικος) "house-carrier", "carries-his-house", a term used for a snail by Hesiod's Works and Days, is another Greek variant of the type, with a thematic -e- instead of the -si-. At least synchronically, φερεπτόλεμος discussed above is also of this type.
