= Amadea (ship) =

Amadea is the name of several ships and boats.

- MS Amadea (1991), a cruise ship operated by Phoenix Reisen, formerly the Asuka (Asuka I)
- MY Amadea (2016), a 106 m (348 ft) motor yacht built by Lürssen and owned by sanctioned Russian oligarch Suleyman Kerimov and seized by the U.S. government
- L'Amadea (19th century), a sloop stolen by pirates; see Capture of the sloop Anne
- French schooner Amadea (19th century), a schooner captured by HMS Emerald in 1808
- American brig Amadea (19th century), a slave ship captured by the British Royal Navy and condemned at Tortola in 1808
