= Leslye Obiora =

American academic

Leslye Amede Obiora (publishes as L. Amede Abiora) is a Nigerian lawyer and professor. Her written work focuses on culture, gender, human rights, and public international law.

== Early life and education ==
Leslye Amede Obiora is from Oguta, a riverine Igbo community in Nigeria. She was born on the cusp of the pogrom that triggered the Biafra Secessionist War to Violet Odiso (née Nwakuche) and Samson B. C. Obiora. Her father was a lawyer and her mother earned a diploma in Home Economics, before marrying in 1951. Obiora was one of nine children born to the couple before her father's death in 1973. Obiora completed her studies earning an LLB from the University of Nigeria in 1984, an LLM from Yale Law School in 1988, and a JSD from Stanford Law School in 2000.

== Professional career ==
Obiora has been a Professor of Law in the United States since 1992. In 1999, she received an unsolicited offer from the World Bank to manage a program to help advance substantive gender equity in Africa. In 2006, she received another unsolicited appointment to serve as the Minister of Mines and Steel Development for the Federal Republic of Nigeria. She is the recipient of several nominations and, including the Coca-Cola World Fund Visiting Faculty at Yale University as well as fellowships from the Center for Advanced Study in the Behavioral Sciences at Stanford, Institute for Advanced Study in Princeton, New Jersey, Rockefeller Foundation Bellagio Study Center, and the Djerassi Resident Artist Program. She has been the Genest Global Faculty at Osgoode Hall Law School in Toronto and the Visiting Gladstein Human Rights Professor at the University of Connecticut. Obiora is the founder of the Institute for Research on African Women, Children and Culture (IRAWCC which is pronounced as "I ROCK").
