= Amédée Joullin =

American painter

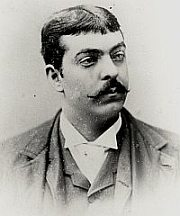
Amédée Joullin (before 1900)

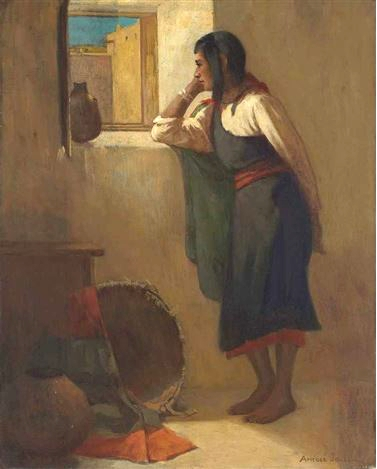
Navajo Woman with Basket and Olla

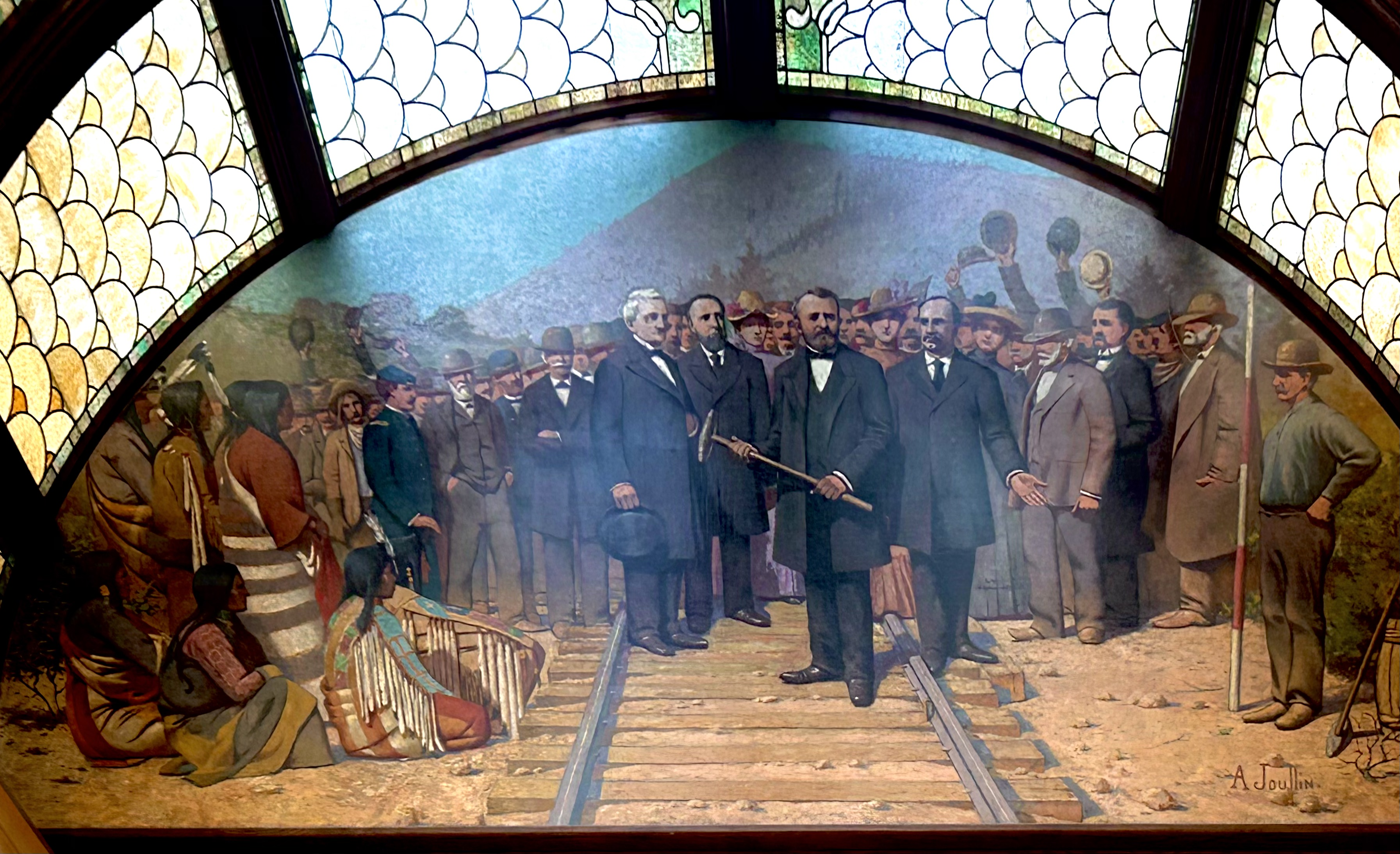
Driving the Golden Spike, oil on canvas, 1903. Montana State Capitol, Helena, Montana. Commemorates the “golden spike” driven at Gold Creek, Montana in 1883

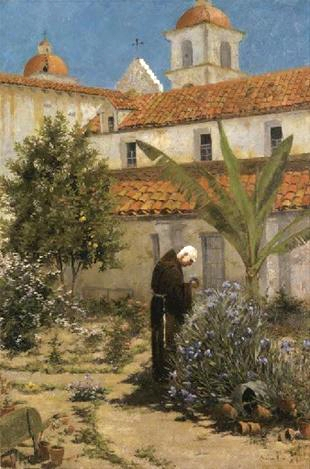
The Gardens at Mission Santa Barbara

Amédée Joullin (3 June 1862, in San Francisco – 3 February 1917, in San Francisco) was a French American painter whose work centered on the landscapes of California and on Native Americans.

== Biography ==
He was born in San Francisco to French parents. He studied painting at the San Francisco Art Institute and then with the painter Jules Tavernier. In 1884, while in Paris, he became impoverished. After returning to the United States in 1886, he was named a professor of painting and design at the San Francisco School of Design, where he stayed for ten years. From 1892 on, he specialized in Amerindian motifs and traveled to Mexico and New Mexico to paint.

He created the painting called Driving The Golden Spike on the southern arch of the rotunda of the Montana State Capitol. For his services, he was paid a sum of $500.

From 1900 through 1905, he studied at the École des Beaux-Arts de Paris and attended the Académie Julian. On May 25, 1907, he married the artist Lucille Wilcox in New York. He died at his home in San Francisco. His works were collected by several museums in the United States, including the De Young Museum of San Francisco, and the Crocker Art Museum in Sacramento.

== Exhibitions ==
- Trans-Mississippi and international exposition. Omaha. 1898.
- First Annual Painters Salon. San Francisco. 1901.
- Union League Club. New York. 1901.
- South Carolina Interstate Exposition. Charleston. 1902.
- Helgesen gallery. San Francisco. 1910.
- Panama-Pacific International Exposition. San Francisco. 1915.
- Palace of Fine Arts. San Francisco. 1916.
- M.H. de Young Memorial Museum of San Francisco.

== Museum collections ==
- Ball State University Museum of Art. Muncie.
- Oakland Museum of California. Oakland.
