= Amade Camal =

Mozambican politician and businessman (1954–2025)

- Born: 1954
- Died: 18 September 2025 (aged 70–71)
- Citizenship: Mozambique
- Occupation: Politician
- Years active: 1994-1999
- Employer: Member of the Assembly of the Republic
- Political party: Assembly of the Republic of Mozambique

Amade Chemane Camal Jr. (1954 – 18 September 2025) was a Mozambican politician and businessman. The CEO of Sir Comercio Internacional, and the father of leading transport businesses in Mozambique. He was a member of the Assembly of the Republic of Mozambique for Nampula Province from 1994 to 1999.

== Politics ==
Camal was critical of the urban planning problems in Maputo, saying that the city's poor infrastructure contributes to its notoriously bad traffic, especially during rush hour, and hurts urban mobility in the county.

In 2023, in protest of Israel's occupation of Palestine, several Mozambican organizations established an unofficial "Israeli Apartheid free zone". Camal's company Sir International joined the protest, stating that they would refuse to sell any Israeli products.

== Personal life ==
A Muslim, Camal attended the public celebrations of Eid al-Adha in Maputo. He denounced the rise of Islamism in Mozambique, saying that Islam is a religion of peace.

== Death ==
Camal died on 18 September 2025, at the age of 71.
