= Amédée Henri Guillemin =

French WWI general (1860-1941)

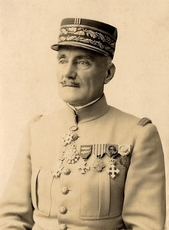
- Born: 30 April 1860; Toulon, Var, France
- Died: 27 December 1941 (aged 81); Saint-Gilles-Croix-de-Vie, Vendée, France, Germany
- Education: École polytechnique
- Military career
- Allegiance: France
- Branch: French Army
- Service years: 1884–c. 1919
- Rank: Général de Division
- Commands: 121st Infantry Division; 131st Infantry Division; 53rd Infantry Division; 19th Infantry Division
- Conflicts: World War I

Amédée Henri Guillemin (1860–1941) was a French Général de Division who served in World War I. During the war, he commanded the 121st Infantry Division, the 131st Infantry Division, the 53rd Infantry Division and the 19th Infantry Division.

== Biography ==
Amédée Henri was born on 30 April 1860 at Toulon, Var as the son of Amédée Guillemin who was a science writer. A student of the École polytechnique, he then joined the School of Artillery and Engineering. After his graduation on 1 October 1884 he was appointed second lieutenant in the 5th Artillery Regiment. By 12 July 1890 Guillemin was within the 17th Artillery Regiment. In 1903, he was promoted to lieutenant and became a member of the General Staff of the French Army. In 1913, he was promoted to colonel. Upon the French entry into World War I, he was made deputy chief of staff to the Minister of War.

On 11 April 1915 he was placed at the head of an infantry brigade. He was promoted to Brigadier General shortly afterwards, and on 14 June 1915 he took command of an infantry division. On 25 June 1916 he was quoted at the order of the army. On 10 February 1917 General Hubert Lyautey wanted to put an end to "the acute organizational crisis which was undermining aeronautics" and created an Aeronautics Department and entrusted it to General Guillemin. This is responsible for ensuring the Senior Management of Aeronautical Services for the Interior and the Armed Forces and for ensuring coordination with the Aeronautical Services of the Navy and the allied armies. This mission came to an end fairly quickly as an Under-Secretariat of State for War in charge of military aeronautics was created and General Guillemin left his post on 20 March 1917, at the time of the fall of the cabinet of Aristide Briand who was replaced by Alexandre Ribot.

On 21 March 1917, the next day, General Guillemin awarded the Commander of the Legion of Honor. By April 1917, he was given command of the 131st Infantry Division. After the war concluded, Guillemin was promoted to Divisional General on 26 June 1918.

== Bibliography ==
- Le Pays de France (April 18, 1918). Le général Guillemin. p. 3.
