= CoRoT-6b =

Hot Jupiter

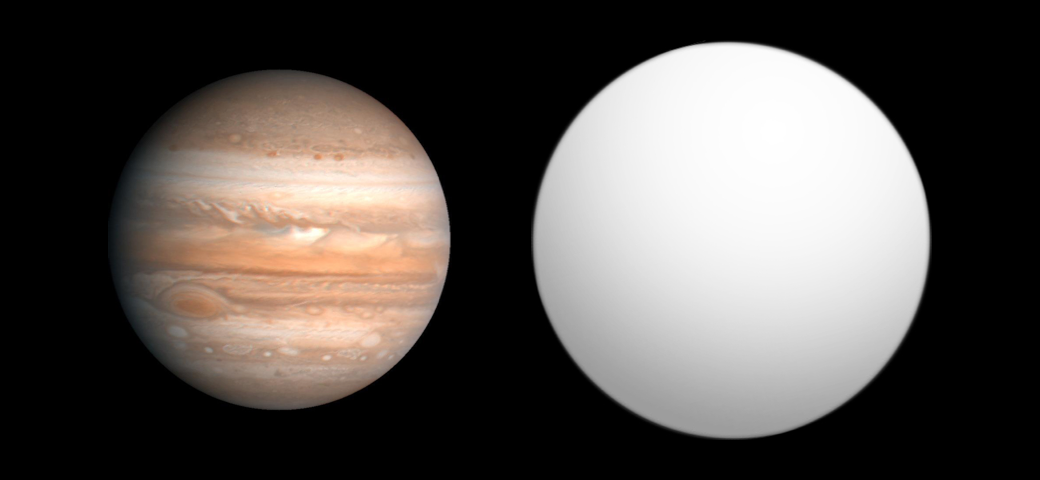
- Size comparison of CoRoT-6b with Jupiter.

Discovery
- Discovered by: CoRoT mission
- Discovery site: Earth orbit
- Discovery date: February 2, 2009
- Detection method: Transit method

Orbital characteristics
- Semi-major axis: 0.0855 ± 0.0015 AU (12,790,000 ± 220,000 km)
- Eccentricity: < 0.1
- Orbital period (sidereal): 8.887 d
- Star: CoRoT-6

Physical characteristics
- Mean radius: 1.166±0.035 R_{J}
- Mass: 2.96±0.34 M_{J}
- Temperature: 1000-1300

CoRoT-6b (previously named CoRoT-Exo-6b) is an exoplanet that was discovered by the CoRoT mission team on February 2, 2009, orbiting the F type star CoRoT-6. It is located in the constellation Ophiuchus.

== Properties and location ==
This planetary object is reported to be about 3.3 times the mass of the planet Jupiter and 1.17 times its size with an orbital period of 8.88 days. It is a hot Jupiter with a temperature between 700 and 1000 °C.
