= Amédée Pichot =

French historian and translator

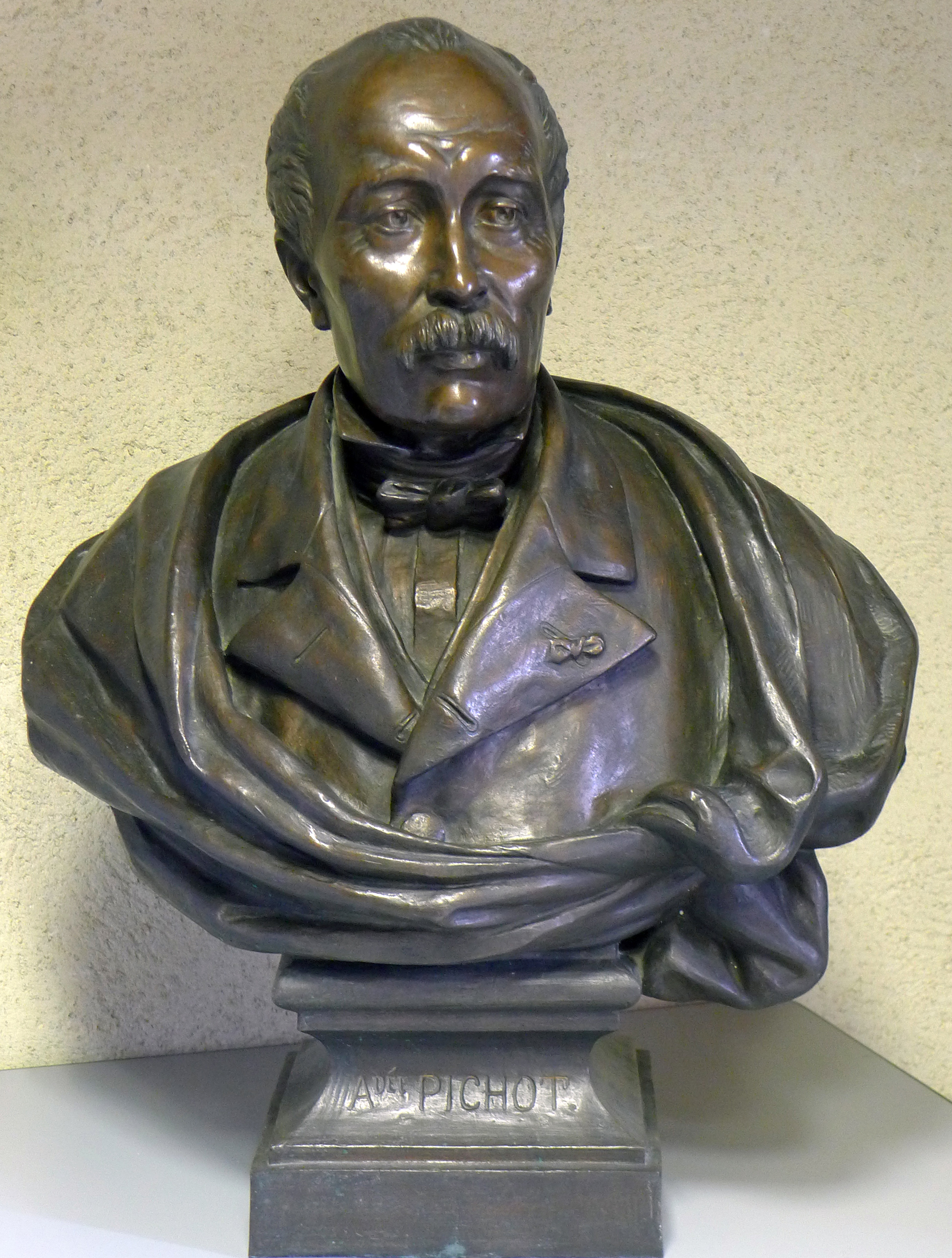
- Bust of Pichot
- Born: Joseph Jean-Baptiste Marie Charles Amédée Pichot; 3 November 1795; France
- Died: 12 February 1877 (aged 81)
- Occupations: historian and translator
- Known for: first translator of Lord Byron and Sir Walter Scott into French

Joseph Jean-Baptiste Marie Charles Amédée Pichot (3 November 1795 – 12 February 1877) was a French historian and translator.

He was an Anglophile and the first translator of Lord Byron and Sir Walter Scott into French. In 1825 he published Voyage Historique et Littéraire en Angleterre et en Écosse, an account of a visit to Britain which includes discussion of contemporary British literature and painting. After 1825, he was the Editor of the Revue Britannique. In 1858 he published a biography of the Scottish surgeon and anatomist Charles Bell.
