= Amadeo (surname) =

Amadeo is a surname. Notable people with the surname include:

- Giovanni Antonio Amadeo (died 1522), Italian sculptor
- Mario Amadeo (1911–1983), Argentine politician, diplomat and writer
- Mike Amadeo (born 1943), American musician and composer
- Roberta Amadeo (born 1970), Italian para-cyclist
