= Amédée Dechambre =

French physician and medical writer

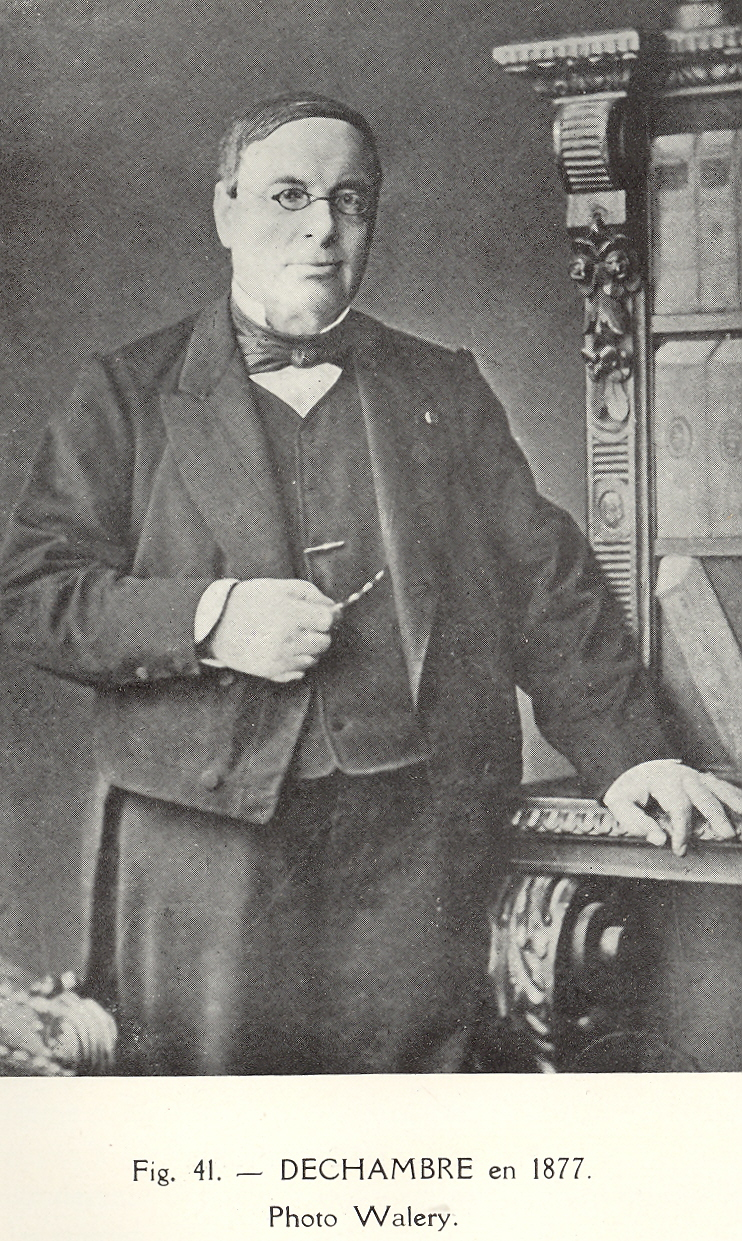
Amédée Dechambre

Amédée Dechambre (12 January 1812 in Sens – 4 January 1886 in Paris) was a French medical doctor and medical writer.

He studied medicine in Paris, where he also worked as a hospital intern. In 1844 he received his medical doctorate from the University of Strasbourg with the dissertation-thesis "Sur l’hypertrophie concentrique du cœur et les déviations de l'épine par rétraction musculaire". From 1838 to 1853 he worked as an editor of the "Gazette médicale de Paris", and he was the founder of the medical-surgical newspaper "Gazette hebdomadaire de médecine et de chirurgie". In 1886, he died in Paris following a stroke.

In 1865 he became an honorary member of the Société Médicale Allemande de Paris. In 1875, he was elected as a member of the Académie de Médecine.

He is best known as being the managing editor of the Dictionnaire encyclopédique des sciences médicales, an encyclopedic medical dictionary that was published from 1864 to 1889 and spread out over 100 volumes. With Mathias-Marie Duval and Léon Lereboullet, he was co-editor of "Dictionnaire usuel des sciences médicales".
