= Jean-Amédée Gibert =

French painter, architect and curator

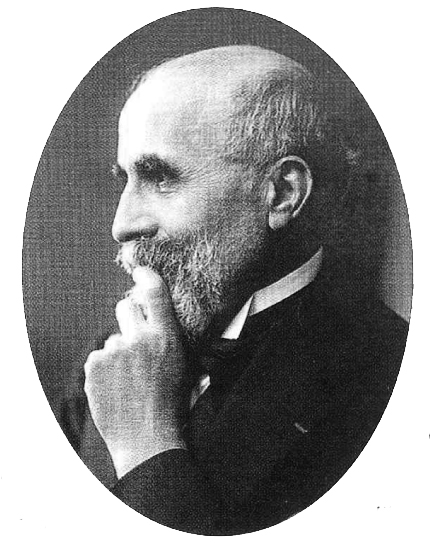
- Born: 22 January 1869; Marseille, France
- Died: 1945; Marseille, France
- Known for: Painting, Architect and Curator
- Movement: Academic art
- Awards: Prix de Rome, 1898

Jean-Amadée Gibert (28 January 1869, Marseille – 1945, Marseille), was a French painter, architect and curator.

== Biography ==
He was a pupil of Antoine Dominique Magaud. In 1890, he won a painting prize in Marseille, which allowed him to study in Paris at the École nationale supérieure des Beaux-Arts, where he was a student of Gérôme and Jourdan. In 1898, he won the Grand Prix of Rome History of painting with The Pool of Bethesda, which included a scholarship for study in Italy, where he discovered archaeology and architecture.

Gibert regularly exhibited portraits, genre scenes, still lifes and landscapes at the Paris Salon and in Marseille. In 1909, he became curator of Musée des Baux-Arts de Marseille, as well as the Grobet-Labadie and the Cantini in the same city. In 1919, he gave several works to museums, including a collection of figurines from Provence.

== Gallery ==
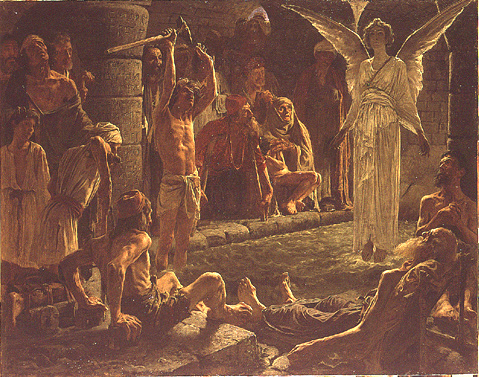
Pool of Bethesda, Prix de Rome, 1898.

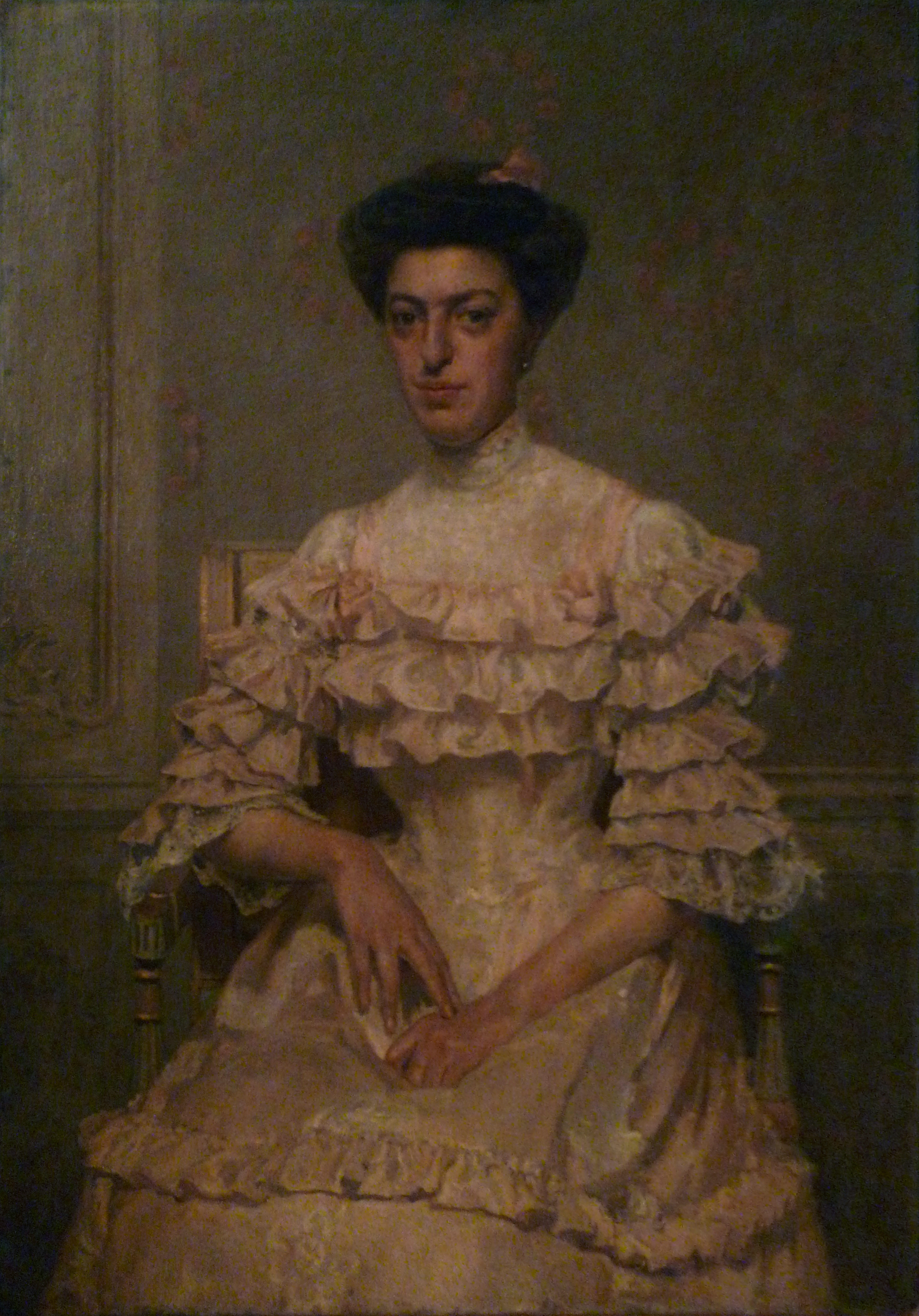
Portrait of Eugenie Gruet, 1907.

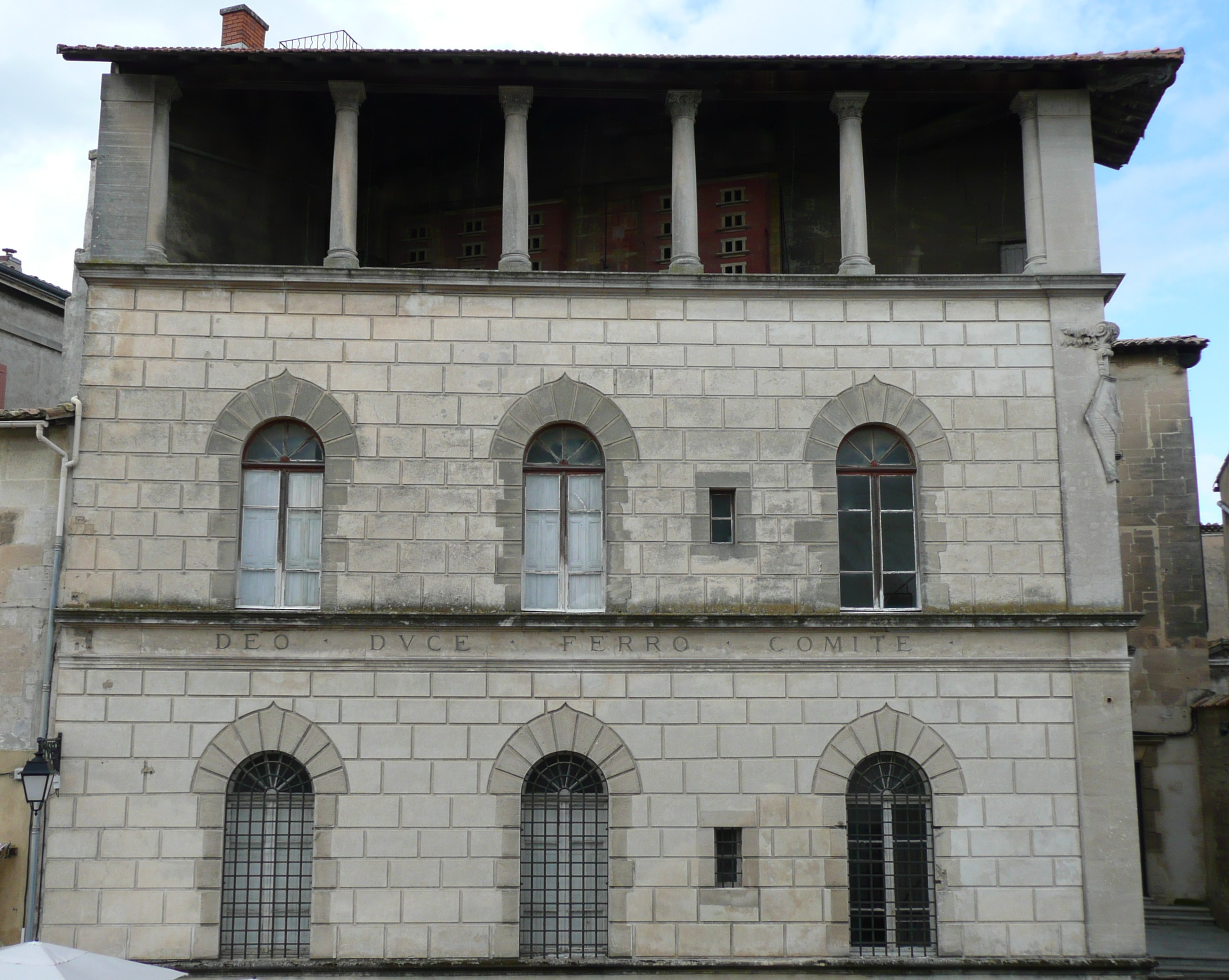
pallace of luppé : facade overlooking the Arles Amphitheatre.

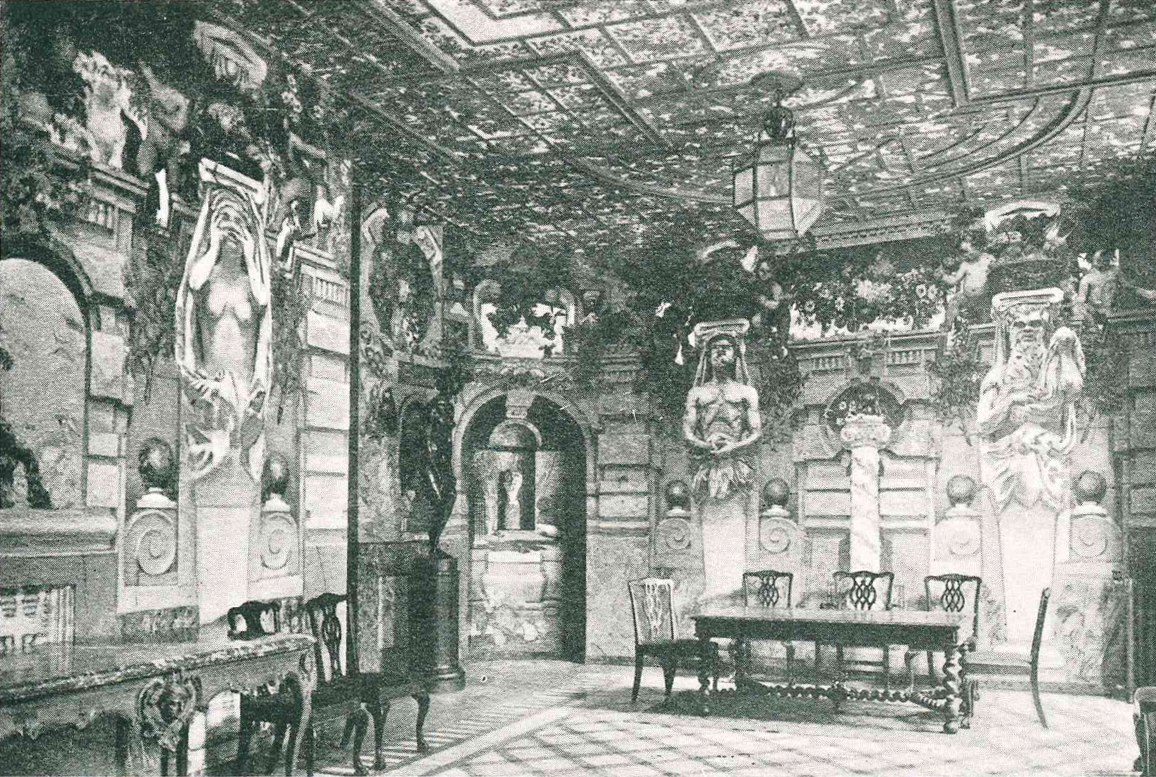
Pallace of Luppé : dining room with painted decorations by Gibert.

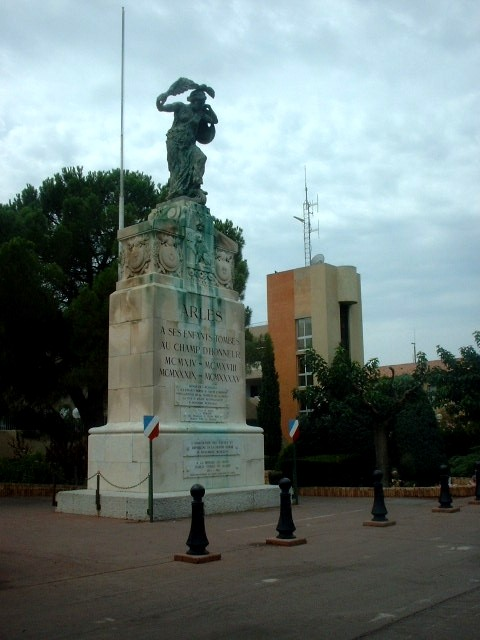
War memorial of Arles, Gibert (architecture), G. Luppé (sculpture)
