= Greg Amadio =

Canadian ice hockey player (born 1981)

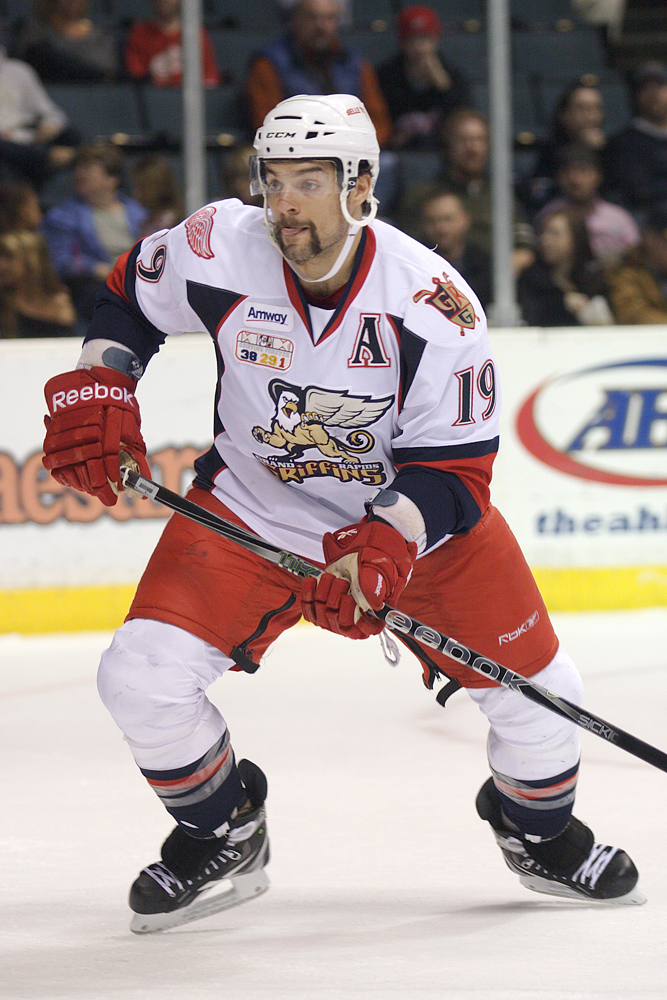
- Amadio with the Grand Rapids Griffins in 2011
- Born: May 13, 1981 (age 44) Sault Ste. Marie, Ontario, Canada
- Height: 6 ft 2 in (188 cm)
- Weight: 225 lb (102 kg; 16 st 1 lb)
- Position: Defence
- Shot: Left
- Played for: Manitoba Moose; Columbia Inferno; Grand Rapids Griffins; Iowa Stars; Portland Pirates; Binghamton Senators; Hershey Bears; Springfield Falcons
- NHL draft: Undrafted
- Playing career: 2003–2013

Greg Amadio (born May 13, 1981) is a Canadian former professional ice hockey defenceman. He is a current defensive development coach for the Sault Ste. Marie Greyhounds of the Ontario Hockey League.

Amadio formerly played for the Hershey Bears when they won back to back Calder Cups in 2008-09 and 2009-10. He also served as an alternate captain during his tenure with the Grand Rapids Griffins. He last played with the Springfield Falcons of the American Hockey League (AHL).

Greg has been actively involved in his older brother Terry's annual Schlitz Open Golf Tournament in Manotick, Ontario, Canada. A tournament that raises money for a variety of local causes.
