= Amadeu Altafaj =

Spanish journalist and diplomat

Amadeu Altafaj i Tardio
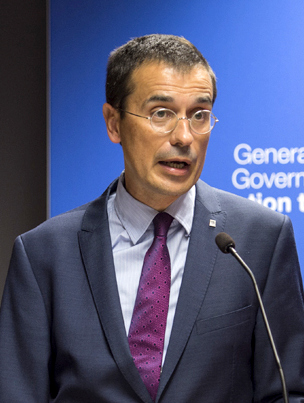

Personal details
- Born: April 27, 1968 (age 58) Barcelona
- Citizenship: Spain
- Profession: Journalist,
- Known for: Permanent Delegate to the European Union

Amadeu Altafaj i Tardio (Barcelona, April 27, 1968) is a journalist. He has been the Representative of the Catalan Government to the European Union as well as Head of Delegation of the Catalan government in Brussels between 2015 and 2017. He was also an alternate member of the European Alliance group at the European Committee of the Regions.

== Career ==
Altafaj was trained as a journalist and began his career in Brussels as a correspondent for COM Ràdio, El Mundo, and ABC. Altafaj was spokesperson of the European Commission for Development and Humanitarian Aid with commissioner Louis Michel. In March 2010, he became the spokesperson for economic and monetary affairs and the Euro of the European Commission, a position in which he gained notoriety in European circles in parallel to the financial and sovereign debt crisis that affected the Euro zone. Between 2012 and 2014, Altafaj was the Deputy Head of Cabinet of Olli Rehn, vice-president of the European Commission and European Commissioner of Economic and Monetary Affairs and the Euro.

On December 23, 2014, the Executive Council of the Catalan Government created the post of Permanent Representative of the Catalan Government to the EU, with a rank of director general (the title was successfully challenged by the Spanish authorities). Altafaj held the position of Head of the Delegation in Brussels and Representative of the Catalan Government to the EU from January 14, 2015 until October 27, 2017, when he was dismissed from his role by the Spanish Government, together with the whole Government of the region and several senior officials, a decision based on article 155 of the Spanish Constitution.

In 2018, Altafaj resumed his professional career in communication and EU affairs in Brussels.
