= Amédée Guillemin =

French science writer and journalist (1826–1893)

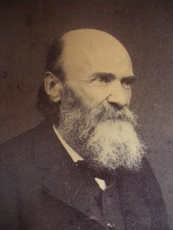
Amédée Guillemin

Amédée Victor Guillemin (born 5 July 1826 in Pierre-de-Bresse, died 2 January 1893 in Pierre-de-Bresse, France) was a French science writer and a journalist.

Guillemin started his studies at Beaune college before taking his final degree in Paris. From 1850 to 1860 he taught mathematics in a private school while writing articles for the liberal press criticizing the Second French Empire. In 1860, he moved to Chambéry where he became a junior deputy editor of the weekly political magazine La Savoie. After the annexation of Savoy by the French empire, he returned to Paris where he became the science editor of l’Avenir national (The Nation's Future).

Guillemin presently started writing books of physics and astronomy which became very popular. He wrote "The Sky" which was translated into many languages. His major work, The Physical World, consisted of five large volumes. His publisher, Hachette, encouraged him to write a series of booklets about astronomy and physics under the title Small popular encyclopaedia, a scientifically sound but accessible collection about sciences and their applications. French astronomer Jacques Crovisier from the Observatoire de Paris suggests he may have been a source of inspiration for Jules Verne's 1865 novel, From the Earth to the Moon.

== Bibliography ==
- La Lune (the moon)
- Le Soleil (the sun)
- La Lumière et les Couleurs (light and colours)
- Le Son (sound)
- Les Etoiles, notions d’astronomie sidérale (the stars, notions of sidereal astronomy)
- Les Nébuleuses (nebulae)
- Le Feu souterrain. Volcans et tremblements de terre (underground fire. Volcanoes and earthquakes) containing 55 illustrations
- La Télégraphie et le téléphone (telegraphy and the telephone) with 101 illustrations
- Le Monde Physique (the physical world) 5 volumes with 31 coloured plates, 80 black and white plates and 2012 illustrations
- Éléments de cosmographie (elements of cosmography)
- La Terre et le ciel (the earth and the sky) 1888
- La Vapeur (steam) Bibliothèque des merveilles collection
- Les Chemins de fer (railways) Bibliothèque des merveilles collection

Guillemin also wrote L’Instruction républicaine (Republican Instruction), published by Lechevalier. He collaborated to a number of literary, scientific and political papers and magazines, notably La Nature, la République Française and la Revue Philosophique et Religieuse. Additionally he wrote Electricity and Magnetism in which he presented a theory of magnetism. It was Guillemin who drafted the entry on astronomy in the second edition of Dorbigny's Dictionary of natural history.

Guillemin was also involved in politics and remained faithful to his liberal convictions to the end.

== See also ==
- Amédée Henri Guillemin (1860-1941), his son

== Footnotes ==
- La Nature, N°1024 14 January 1893
- Angelo De Gubernatis, Dictionnaire international des écrivains du jour, 1891.
