= Bogolyubov =

Bogolyubov or Boholyubov (Russian: Боголю́бов; Ukrainian: Боголюбов) is a surname in Russia and Ukraine, meaning "he who loves God". It is of Old Russian origin. Spellings Bogoljubov and Bogoliubov are also used. The feminine form is Bogolyubova (Russian: Боголюбова). The following persons have this surname:

- Alexey Bogolyubov (1824–1896), Russian landscape painter
- Ārons Bogoļubovs (born 1938), Soviet Olympic medalist judoka
- Efim Bogoljubov (1889–1952), Ukrainian-German chess Grandmaster
- Gennadiy Bogolyubov (born 1961/1962), a London-based Ukrainian billionaire
- Nikolay Bogolyubov (mathematician) (1909–1992), Russian theoretical physicist and mathematician
- Nikolay Bogolyubov (actor) (1899–1980), Russian actor
