= Amadio Freddi =

Italian composer

Amadio Freddi (1570–1634) was an Italian composer. He was Maestro di cappella of the Duomo of Treviso.

== Works ==
- Primo libro de madrigali à sei voci 1605.
- Secondo libro de madrigali a cinque voci
- Quarto libro de madrigal a cinque voci 1614
- Messa, Vespro et Compieta 1616
- Motecta unica voce decantando, Venezia, 1623
- Antiphonae in Annuntiatione Beatae Mariae Virginis, 1642 (posthumous)
