= Amadeus (airline) =

German airline

Amadeus Flugdienst
IATA	ICAO	Call sign
B5	—	—
- Founded: 1996
- Commenced operations: 1996
- Ceased operations: July 2004
- Operating bases: Frankfurt-Hahn Airport, Germany

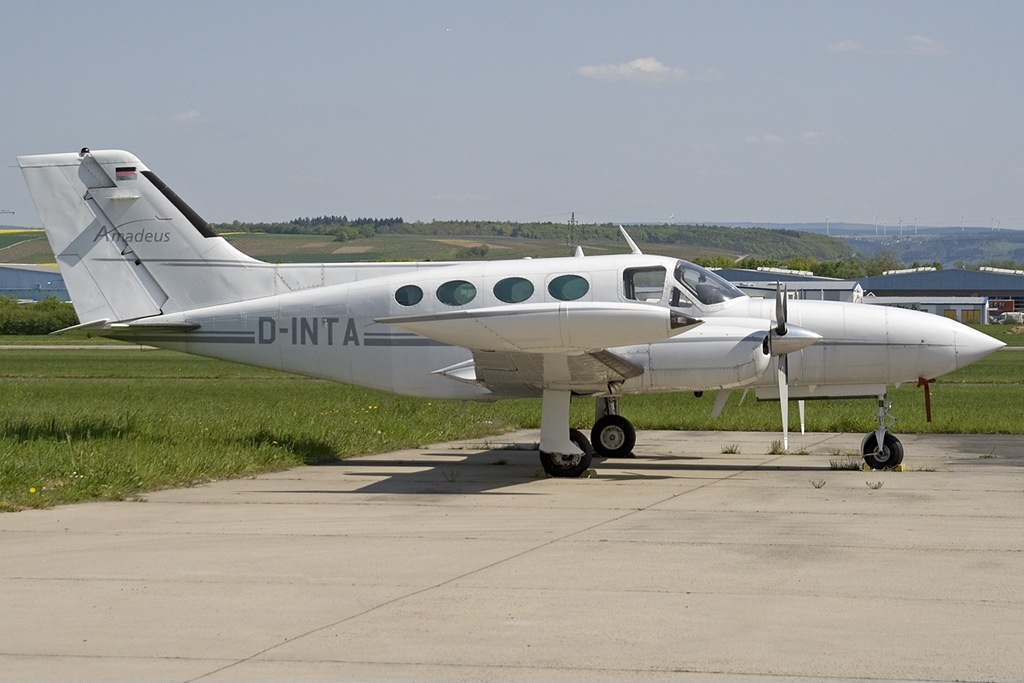
Cessna Golden Eagle

Amadeus Flugdienst was a German airline. It operated scheduled domestic passenger services from Frankfurt-Hahn Airport. It was established and started operations in 1996. Operations ceased in July 2004.
