= Amadee =

Amadee may refer to:

== People ==
- Amadee Wohlschlaeger (1911–2014), American cartoonist known professionally as just "Amadee"
- Amadee J. Van Beuren (1880–1938), American film producer
- Joseph Amadee Goguen (1941–2006), American computer scientist
- F. Amadee Bregy, namesake of the F. Amadee Bregy School

== Other uses ==
- AMADEE, several programs of the Austrian Space Forum#AMADEE program

== See also ==
- Amade (name)
- Amadea (disambiguation)
- Amadeo (disambiguation)
- Amédée (disambiguation)
- Amedeo (disambiguation)
- Amadeus (disambiguation)
