= Amedeo =

Amedeo is an Italian theophoric given name meaning "lover of God", "loves God", or more correctly "for the love of God" and cognate to the Latin name Amadeus, the Spanish Amadeo, the Catalan and Portuguese Amadeu and the French Amédée.

People with this name include:

- A number of rulers and nobles associated with the historical region of Savoy
  - Amadeus I, Count of Savoy (r. 1030–1051)
  - Amadeus II, Count of Savoy (r. 1078–1080)
  - Amadeus III, Count of Savoy (r. 1103–1148)
  - Amadeus IV, Count of Savoy (r. 1233–1253)
  - Amadeus V, Count of Savoy (r. 1285–1323)
  - Amadeus VI, Count of Savoy (r. 1343–1383)
  - Amadeus VII, Count of Savoy (r. 1383–1391)
  - Amadeus VIII, Duke of Savoy (r. 1391–1440), later known as Antipope Felix V
  - Amadeus IX, Duke of Savoy (r. 1465–1472)
  - Amedeo di Savoia (1845–1890), later Amadeo I of Spain
  - Prince Amedeo, Duke of Aosta (1898–1942)
  - Prince Amedeo, Duke of Aosta (1943–2021)
- Amedeo Agostini (1892–1958), Italian mathematician
- Amedeo Avogadro Italian scientist
- Amadeo Bordiga Italian Marxist and revolutionary Communist
- Amedeo Felisa (1946), CEO of Ferrari and Aston Martin
- Amedeo Minghi (1947), Italian singer-songwriter
- Amedeo Modigliani (a.k.a. Modi), Italian painter and sculptor
- Prince Amedeo of Belgium, Archduke of Austria-Este (b. 1986)

== See also ==
- for people with the first name Amedeo
- for people with the first name Amédéo
- Amadea (disambiguation)
- Amadee (disambiguation)
- Amadeo (disambiguation)
- Amadeus (disambiguation)
- Amédée (disambiguation)
