= Bohumil =

- Pronunciation: Czech: [ˈboɦumɪl] Slovak: [ˈbɔɦumil]
- Gender: male
- Language: Czech, Slovak

Other gender
- Feminine: Bohumila

Origin
- Origin: Slavic
- Meaning: 'dear to God'
- Region of origin: Czech Republic, Slovakia

Other names
- Related names: Bogomil, Bogumił, Bohuslav, Bogusław, Bogdan

Bohumil is a male given name of Slavic origin. It means "favoured by God", derived from the Slavic words bog (god) and mil (favour). Its feminine equivalent is Bohumila.

Nicknames of Bohumil include Bohouš, Bohoušek, Bohuš, Mila, Milek, Bogie, Boga, Bozha. Other forms of the name are Bogomil, Bogumił (Polish variant) and Bogolyub.

== Name days ==
- Czech: 3 October
- Slovak: 3 March
- Polish: 13 January, 18 January, 26 February, 10 June or 3 November

== Notable people with the name ==
- Bogumilus (1135?–1204?), Archbishop of Gniezno and hermit
- Bohumil Andrejko (born 1953), Slovak football coach
- Bohumil Berdych, Czechoslovak slalom canoeist
- Bohumil Brhel (born 1965), Czech speedway rider
- Bohumil Bydžovský (1880–1969), Czech mathematician
- Bohumil Cepák (1951–2021), Czech former handball player
- Bohumil Doležal (born 1940), Czech literary critic, politician and former dissident
- Bohumil Durdis (1903–1983), Czech weightlifter
- Bohumil Fidler (1860-1944), Czech composer, choirmaster, choral conductor and music teacher
- Bohumil Golián (1931–2012), Slovak former volleyball player
- Bohumil Gregor (1926–2005), Czech conductor
- Bohumil Hájek, Czech table tennis player
- Bohumil Herlischka (1919–2006), Czech opera director
- Bohumil Honzátko 1875–1950), Czech gymnast and long-distance runner
- Bohumil Hrabal (1914–1997), Czech writer
- Bohumil Jank (born 1992), Czech ice hockey player
- Bohumil Janoušek (born 1937), Czech rower
- Bohumil Jauris (1933–1992), Czech speed skater
- Bohumil Jelínek, Czech footballer
- Bohumil Jílek (1892–1963), Czechoslovak politician
- Bohumil Kafka (1878–1942), Czech sculptor and pedagogue
- Bohumil Kněžek (1900–1979), Czech architect
- Bohumil Kosour (1913–1997), Czechoslovak soldier and skier
- Bohumil Kubišta (1884–1918), Czech painter and art critic
- Bohumil Kubrycht, Czech cyclist
- Bohumil Kubát (1935–2016), Czechoslovak wrestler
- Bohumil Kudrna (1920–1991), Czechoslovak flatwater canoer
- Bohumil Kučera (1874–1921), Czech physicist
- Bohumil Laušman (1903–1963), Czech politician
- Bohumil Makovsky (1878–1950), American band leader from Austro-Hungary
- Bohumil Mathesius (1888–1952), Czech poet, translator, publicist and literary scientist
- Bohumil Mazánek (born 1962), Czech diplomat
- Bohumil Modrý (1916–1963), Czech ice hockey goaltender
- Bohumil Mořkovský (1899–1928), Czech gymnast
- Bohumil Mudřík (born 1941), Czech gymnast
- Bohumil Müller (1915–1987), Jehovah's Witnesses religious leader in Czechoslovakia during and after World War II
- Bohumil Musil (1922–1999), Czech football player
- Bohumil Němeček (1938–2010), Czechoslovak welterweight boxer
- Bohumil Páník (born 1956), Czech football manager
- Bohumil Povejšil, Czech gymnast
- Bohumil Prošek (1931–2014), Czechoslovak ice hockey player
- Bohumil Rameš (1895–1974), Czech cyclist
- Bohumil Říha (1907–1987), Czechoslovak writer
- Bohumil Sekla (1901–1987), Czechoslovak biologist
- Bohumil Shimek (1861–1937), American naturalist, conservationist and professor
- Bohumil Sládek, Czechoslovak sprint canoeist
- Bohumil Slavíček (born 1991), Czech ice hockey player
- Bohumil Smolík (1943–2008), Czech footballer
- Bohumil Smrček (born 1961), Czech football manager
- Bohumil Starnovský (born 1953), Czech modern pentathlete
- Bohumil Staša (1944–2019), Czech former Grand Prix motorcycle road racer
- Bohumil Šťastný (1905–1991), Czech photojournalist
- Bohumil Steigenhöfer (1905–1989), Czechoslovak ice hockey player
- Bohumil Sýkora, Czech weightlifter
- Bohumil Tomášek (1936–2019), Czech basketball player and coach
- Bohumil Veselý (born 1945), Czech footballer
- Bohumil Váňa (1920–1989), Czechoslovak tennis player
- Bohumil Záhorský (1906–1980), Czechoslovak actor
- Bohumil Zemánek (1942–1996), Czech sculptor and restorer

== See also ==
- Bogomil (name)
- Bogomilism
- Slavic names
