= Bogusław (given name) =

Male given name

- Pronunciation: Polish: [bɔˈɡu.swaf]
- Gender: male
- Language: Polish

Origin
- Region of origin: Poland

Other names
- Alternative spelling: Bogislaw
- Related names: Bohuslav, Bogdan, Bogomil

Bogusław (Polish: [bɔˈɡu.swaf], also Bogosław, Bohusław, Bogsław, Cyrillic: Богуслав, German: Bogislaw, Bogislaus) is a Polish masculine given name. It is derived from the roots Bogu- ("Bóg", meaning "God" in Polish, but originally "fortune, chance") and -sław ("fame, glory"). The female equivalent of this Slavic name is Bogusława.

An alternative spelling of the name is Bogislaw/Bogislav, which was primarily used by several Dukes of Pomerania. The Czech form of the name is Bohuslav.

It is one of the few Slavic given names that are present throughout the Slavic language family, and is known in the Slavic countries since the beginning of the 13th century. It was popular in medieval times, where it has been recorded for about 700 people in Poland and during the 20th and early 21st centuries. It only dropped in popularity during the 16th century. Common among most Slavic nations, today the name is usually found among Polish-speakers.

Typical diminutive versions of the name in Polish include: (male) Bosław, Boguś, Bogdan, Bohusz, Bogoń, Bogosz, Bogunek, Bost, Bosz, Boszek; (female) Boguta, Bogna, Bogota, Bogusza, Boszuta.

== Notable people with the name ==
=== Bogusław ===
- Bogusław Bachorczyk (born 1969), Polish painter
- Bogusław Bagsik (born 1963), Polish businessman and politician
- Bogusław Baniak (born 1958), Polish football player and coach
- Bogusław Bobrański (1904–1991), Polish chemist
- Bogusław Bosak (born 1968), Polish politician
- Bogusław Cygan (1964–2018), Polish football player
- Bogusław Dąbrowski (born 1966), Polish theologian, writer and Franciscan priest
- Bogusław Duda (born 1953), Polish racewalker
- Bogusław Fornalczyk (1937–2025), Polish cyclist
- Bogusław Gierajewski (1937–2025), Polish sprinter
- Bogusław Korwin Gosiewski (1669–1744), Polish bishop and nobleman
- Bogusław Hajdas (born 1939), Polish footballer
- Bogusław Jackowski (born 1950), Polish computer scientist
- Bogusław Jarecki (born 1957), Polish equestrian
- Bogusław Kaczmarek (born 1950), Polish football player and manager
- Bogusław Kaczyński (1942–2016), Polish music journalist
- Bogusław Kanicki (born 1953), Polish volleyball player
- Bogusław Tadeusz Kopka (born 1969), Polish historian and professor
- Bogusław Kowalski (born 1964), Polish politician
- Bogusław Krawczyk (1906–1941), submarine commander of the Polish Navy
- Bogusław Leszczyński (1614–1659), Polish nobleman
- Bogusław Leśnodorski (1914–1985), Polish historian and professor
- Bogusław Liberadzki (born 1948), Polish economist and politician
- Bogusław Linda (born 1952), Polish actor
- Bogusław Litwiniec (1931–2022), Polish theatre director and politician
- Bogusław Lustyk (born 1940), Polish poster artist
- Bogusław Mamiński (born 1955), Polish long distance runner
- Bogusław Mec (1947–2012), Polish singer
- Bogusław Nowak (1952–2024), Polish international speedway rider
- Bogusław Oblewski (born 1957), Polish footballer
- Bogusław Ogrodnik (born 1965), Polish mountaineer
- Bogusław Owczarek (born 1965), Polish equestrian
- Bogusław Pachelski (born 1962), Polish footballer
- Bogusław Pawłowski (born 1962), Polish biologist and professor
- Bogusław Pietrzak (born 1958), Polish football manager
- Bogusław Plich (born 1959), Polish football player and manager
- Bogusław Polch (1941–2020), Polish comic book artist
- Bogusław Psujek (1956–1990), Polish long-distance runner
- Bogusław Radoszewski (c. 1577 – 1638), Polish nobleman and priest
- Bogusław Radziwiłł (1620–1669), Polish nobleman
- Bogusław Fryderyk Radziwiłł (1809–1873), Polish nobleman, military officer and politician
- Bogusław Rogalski (born 1972), Polish politician
- Bogusław Samborski (1897–1971), Polish film actor
- Bogusław Schaeffer (1929–2019), Polish composer
- Bogusław Shashkevych (1888–1936), Ukrainian major of the Ukrainian Galician Army
- Bogusław Sobczak (born 1979), Polish politician
- Bogusław Sochnacki (1930–2004), Polish actor
- Bogusław Sonik (born 1953), Polish politician
- Bogusław Sygulski (1957–2017), Polish chess player
- Bogusław Szwacz (1912–2009), Polish-born artist
- Bogusław Widawski (1934–1986), Polish footballer
- Bogusław Wolniewicz (1927–2017), Polish philosopher
- Bogusław Wołoszański (born 1950), Polish journalist and author
- Bogusław Wontor (born 1967), Polish politician
- Bogusław Wos (1960–2022), 2022 missile explosion in Poland victim
- Bogusław Wróblewski (born 1955), Polish critic, literary scholar, and translator
- Bogusław Wyparło (born 1974), Polish football player
- Bogusław Ziętek (born 1964), Polish trade union activist
- Bogusław Zych (1951–1995), Polish fencer
- Bogusław Zychowicz (born 1961), Polish butterfly swimmer

=== Bogislaw ===
- Bogislaw I (c. 1130–1187), Duke of Pomerania
- Bogislaw II (c. 1177–1220), Duke of Pomerania
- Bogislaw IV (c. 1255–1309), Duke of Pomerania
- Bogislaw V (c. 1318–1374), Duke of Pomerania
- Bogislaw VI (c. 1350–1393), Duke of Pomerania
- Bogislaw VII (1355–1404), Duke of Pomerania
- Bogislaw VIII (c. 1364–1418), Duke of Pomerania
- Bogislav IX (1407/1410–1446), Duke of Pomerania
- Bogislaw X (1454–1523), Duke of Pomerania
- Bogislaw XIII (1544–1606), Duke of Pomerania
- Bogislaw XIV (1580–1637), Duke of Pomerania
- Bogislav Friedrich Emanuel von Tauentzien (1760–1824), Prussian general of the Napoleonic Wars
- Bogislaw von Bonin (1908–1980), German Wehrmacht officer and journalist
- Friedrich Bogislav von Tauentzien (1710–1791), Prussian general
- Gustav Bogislav von Münchow (1686–1766), Prussian general

== See also ==
- Bohuslav (given name)
- Bogusławski (disambiguation)
- Slavic names
