= Bogumił =

- Pronunciation: Polish: [bɔˈɡumiw]
- Gender: masculine
- Language: Polish

Other gender
- Feminine: Bogumiła

Origin
- Meaning: 'dear to God'

Other names
- Related names: Bogdan, Bogomil, Bogusław, Bohumil, Bohuslav

Bogumił (Polish: [bɔˈɡumiw]) is a Polish masculine given name. It is the Polish form of the Slavic name Bogomil. It is composed of the Slavic words 'bog' (god) and 'mil' (dear) and means 'dear to God' or 'favoured by God'.

The feminine form of the name is Bogumiła.

== Notable people with the name ==
=== Bogumił ===
- Bogumił (Archbishop of Gniezno) (died 1092), archbishop of Gniezno
- Bogumilus (Bogumił), archbishop of Gniezno and hermit
- Bogumił W. Andrzejewski (1922–1994), Polish-British linguist
- Bogumił Brzezinski (born 1943), Polish chemist
- Bogumił Gacka (born 1955), Polish Catholic priest
- Bogumił Gozdur (1935–2017),Polish football player and manager
- Bogumił Grott (born 1940), Polish historian, lecturer and professor
- Bogumił Kobiela (1931–1969), Polish film actor
- Bogumił Książek (born 1974), Polish painter
- Bogumił Linka (1865–1920), Polish-Masurian social and national activist
- Bogumił Pawłowski (1898–1971), Polish botanist
- Bogumił Strzyżewski (1933–2019), Polish professor of agricultural sciences
- Bogumił Šwjela (1873–1948), Sorbian Protestant clergyman and ethnic activist

=== Bogumiła ===
- Bogumiła Berdychowska (born 1964), Polish writer and journalist
- Bogumiła Lisocka-Jaegermann (born 1956), Polish social scientist and writer
- Bogumiła Matusiak (born 1971), Polish cyclist
- Bogumiła Pajor (born 1960), Polish field hockey player

== See also ==
- Bogomil (name)
