= Bogomil (name) =

- Gender: masculine
- Language: Slavic

Other gender
- Feminine: Bogomila

Origin
- Meaning: 'dear to God'

Other names
- Variant form: Bogumil
- Related names: Bogdan, Bogumił, Bogusław, Bohumil, Bohuslav

Bogomil (Cyrillic: Богомил) is a given name of Slavic origin. It is composed of the Slavic words 'bog' (god) and 'mil' (dear) and means 'dear to God' or 'favoured by God'. The feminine form of the name is Bogomila.

The Polish form of the name is Bogumił, the Czech and Slovak form is Bohumil. The sound change of 'g' > 'h' occurred in Ukrainian, Belarusian, Czech and Slovak.

Names with the meaning "dear to god" in different languages include Latin Amadeus, Serbian Bogoljub, Greek Theophilus (which gave rise to "Theophil") and German Gottlieb, as well as a Russian surname Bogolyubov.

== Notable people ==
=== Bogomil ===
- Bogomil (priest), medieval Bulgarian monk, founder of the Gnostic sect known as Bogomilism
- Bogomil Avramov (born 1937), Bulgarian writer
- Bogomil Bonev (born 1957), Bulgarian politician
- Bogomil Bozhurkin (born 2002), Bulgarian footballer
- Bogomil Dyakov (born 1984), Bulgarian footballer
- Bogomil Ferfila (born 1951), Slovenian political scientist, economist, and journalist
- Bogomil Gjuzel (1939–2021), Macedonian writer
- Bogomil Hristov (born 1994), Bulgarian footballer
- Bogomil Pavlov (born 1992), Bulgarian ski jumper
- Bogomil Petrov (born 1939), Bulgarian weightlifter
- Bogomil Raynov (1919–2007), Bulgarian writer and professor
- Bogomil Tsintsarski (born 1997), Bulgarian footballer

=== Bogumil ===
- Bogumil Dawison (1818–1872), German actor
- Bogumil Goltz (1801–1870), German humorist and satirist
- Bogumil Hrabak (1927–2010), Serbian historian and university professor
- Bogumil Jewsiewicki (born 1942), Polish-Canadian historian
- Bogumil Vošnjak (1882–1955), Slovenian jurist, politician and diplomat

=== Bogomila ===
- Bogomila Welsh-Ovcharov (born 1940), Bulgarian-Canadian art historian

== See also ==
- Hartmann Bogumil (born 1938), German sailor
- Bogomil (village)
- Bohumil
- Bogumił
