= Bogumil =

Bogumil can refer to:

- Bogumił, Polish given name
- Bogomil (name), Slavic name also spelled Bogumil
- Bogomilism, an ancient Gnostic religious community which is thought to have originated in Bulgaria
