= Bohumila =

Bohumila is a given name, the feminine form of Bohumil. It is borne by:

- Bohumila Bednářová (1904–1985), Czech astronomer
- Bohumila Bloudilová (1876–1946), Czech portrait photographer
- Bohumila Grögerová (1921–2014), Czech and Czechoslovak poet and translator
- Bohumila Kapplová (born 1944), Czech Olympic canoer
- Bohumila Míla Myslíková (1933–2005), Czech actress
- Bohumila Řimnáčová (1947–2025), Czech gymnast
