= Bohuslav (given name) =

Male given name

- Pronunciation: Czech pronunciation: [ˈboɦuslaf]
- Gender: male
- Language: Czech

Other names
- Related names: Bogusław, Bogdan, Bogomil, Bohumil

Bohuslav (Czech pronunciation: [ˈboɦuslaf]) is a Czech masculine given name. The Polish form of the name is Bogusław.

The name is derived from the roots Bohu- ("Bůh", meaning "God" in Czech, but originally "fortune, chance") and -slav ("fame, glory").

Notable people with the name include:

- Bohuslav Balbín (1621–1688), Czech writer and historian
- Bohuslav Balcar (1943–2017), Czech mathematician
- Bohuslav Beránek (1946–2007) Czech orienteering competitor
- Bohuslav Braum (born 1956), Czech weightlifter
- Bohuslav Brauner (1855–1935), Czech chemist
- Bohuslav Bílejovský (c. 1480 – 1555), Czech historian and theologian
- Bohuslav Ceplecha (1977–2012), Czech rally co-driver
- Bohuslav Chňoupek (1925–2004), Czechoslovak politician, journalist and writer
- Bohuslav, Count Chotek of Chotkow and Wognin (1829–1896), Bohemian nobleman, landowner and diplomat
- Bohuslav Diviš (1942–1976), Czech mathematician
- Bohuslav Ebermann (born 1948), Czech ice hockey player
- Bohuslav Ečer (1893–1954), Czechoslovak general and lawyer
- Bohuslav Fiala (canoeist), Czechoslovak slalom canoeist
- Bohuslav Fiala (general) (1890–1964), Czechoslovak brigadier general
- Bohuslav Fuchs (1895–1972), Czech modernist architect
- Bohuslav Hasištejnský z Lobkovic (1461–1510), Bohemian nobleman and writer
- Bohuslav Havránek (1893–1978), Czech philologist
- Bohuslav Hostinský (1884–1951), Czech mathematician and theoretical physicist
- Bohuslav Hykš, Czech tennis player
- Bohuslav Karlík (1908–1996), Czech canoeist
- Bohuslav Kirchmann, Czechoslovak fencer
- Bohuslav Kokotek (1949–2016), Polish-Czech Lutheran clergyman and journalist
- Bohuslav Martinů (1890–1959), Czech composer of modern classical music
- Bohuslav Matoušek (born 1949), Czech violinist
- Bohuslav Matěj Černohorský (1684–1742), Czech composer and organist
- Bohuslav Niemiec (born 1982), Czech politician
- Bohuslav Pilný (born 1973), Czech football player and manager
- Bohuslav Pospíchal, Czechoslovak slalom canoeist
- Bohuslav Reynek (1892–1971), Czech poet, writer, painter and translator
- Bohuslav Rylich (1934–2020), Czech basketball player
- Bohuslav Schnirch (1845–1901), Czech sculptor and designer
- Bohuslav Sobotka (born 1971), Czech politician, prime minister of the Czech Republic in 2014–2017
- Bohuslav Svoboda (born 1944), Czech politician, mayor of Prague
- Bohuslav Šťastný (born 1949), Czech ice hockey player

== See also ==
- Erich Bohuslav (1927–1961), Austrian water polo player
- Bogusław (given name)
