= 1975–76 2nd Bundesliga (ice hockey) season =

Third season of the second highest German ice hockey league

The 1975-76 2nd Bundesliga season was the third season of the 2nd Bundesliga, the second level of ice hockey in Germany. Ten teams participated in the league, and Augsburger EV won the championship, and was promoted to the Ice hockey Bundesliga as a result. TSV Straubing was relegated to the Oberliga.

== Regular season ==
	Club	GP	W	T	L	Goals	Pts
1.	Augsburger EV	36	28	1	7	281:148	57
2.	ESV Kaufbeuren	36	25	1	10	204:155	51
3.	Duisburger SC	36	23	3	10	176:129	49
4.	EC Deilinghofen	36	22	4	10	190:121	48
5.	Mannheimer ERC	36	20	5	11	209:158	45
6.	SG Nuremberg	36	13	3	20	159:177	29
7.	EV Pfronten	36	11	1	24	135:184	23
8.	EC Peiting	36	10	3	23	122:195	23
9.	TEV Miesbach	36	8	4	24	108:212	20
10.	TSV Straubing	36	6	3	27	126:231	15
