= Avramov =

Avramov is a Bulgarian and Serbian surname. Notable people with the surname include:

- Andrijana Avramov (born 1979), Serbian politician
- Bogomil Avramov (born 1937), Bulgarian writer and poet
- Georgi Avramov (born 1983), Bulgarian footballer
- Nikola Avramov (1897–1945), Bulgarian painter
- Smilja Avramov (1918–2018), Serbian academic, authority and educator in international law
- Vlada Avramov (born 1979), Serbian footballer
