= 1973–74 2nd Bundesliga (ice hockey) season =

The 1973-74 2nd Bundesliga season was the first season of the 2nd Bundesliga, the second level of ice hockey in Germany. 10 teams participated in the league, and ESV Kaufbeuren won the championship, and was promoted to the Ice hockey Bundesliga as a result. EV Ravensburg was relegated to the Oberliga

== Regular season ==
	Club	GP	W	T	L	Goals	Pts
1.	ESV Kaufbeuren	36	27	3	6	216:83	57
2.	Mannheimer ERC	36	24	2	10	215:126	50
3.	EC Deilinghofen	36	21	7	8	185:104	49
4.	EV Rosenheim	36	22	4	10	181:146	48
5.	Duisburger SC	36	19	4	13	171:138	42
6.	SG Nürnberg	36	11	5	20	149:182	27
7.	EV Pfronten	36	11	4	21	113:181	26
8.	TEV Miesbach	36	9	6	21	130:217	24
9.	EV Landsberg	36	8	4	24	111:212	20
10.	EV Ravensburg	36	7	3	26	127:209	17
