= Bogoljub =

Bogoljub (Serbian Cyrillic: Богољуб) is a Serbian masculine given name, meaning "love of God". It may refer to:

- Bogoljub Jevtić (1886–1960), Serbian politician
- Bogoljub Karić (born 1954), Serbian businessman and politician
- Bogoljub Kočović (1920–2013), Serbian jurist and statistician
- Bogoljub Marković (born 2005), Serbian basketball player
- Bogoljub Mitić (1969–2017), Serbian actor and comedian
- Bogoljub Nedeljković (1920–1986), Serbian politician
- Bogoljub Šijaković (born 1955), Serbian professor and politician

== See also ==
- Bogomil (name)
