= Bohumil Slavíček =

Czech ice hockey player

- Born: December 30, 1991 (age 33); Ústí nad Labem, Czechoslovakia
- Height: 5 ft 8 in (173 cm)
- Weight: 149 lb (68 kg; 10 st 9 lb)
- Position: Forward
- Shoots: Left
- Regionalliga team Former teams: TEV Miesbach; HC Slavia Praha; Piráti Chomutov
- Playing career: 2011–present

Bohumil Slavíček (born December 30, 1991) is a Czech professional ice hockey player for TEV Miesbach of the Regionalliga.

Slavíček previously played twelve games in the Czech Extraliga, four with HC Slavia Praha and eight with Piráti Chomutov.
