= Bohuslav Niemiec =

Czech politician

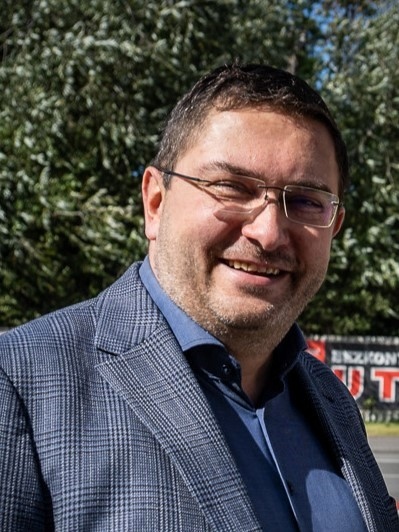

Member of the Chamber of Deputies
- Incumbent
- Assumed office 4 October 2025

Deputy Chairman of KDU–ČSL
- In office 29 March 2019 – 25 January 2020

Personal details
- Born: 2 November 1982 (age 43) Havířov, Czechoslovakia (now Czech Republic)
- Party: KDU–ČSL
- Education: Technical University of Ostrava

Bohuslav Niemiec (Polish: Bogusław Niemiec) (born 11 February 1982) is a Czech politician and deputy chairman of the Christian and Democratic Union – Czechoslovak People's Party (KDU-ČSL) since March 2019.

He was elected as deputy leader in the 2019 Christian and Democratic Union – Czechoslovak People's Party leadership election, nominated as non-Catholic politician and member of the Church of Brethren in the leadership. He is a member in the communal council of Havířov.

He was elected in the 2025 Czech legislative election as a Member of Parliament from the list of SPOLU as a member of KDU-ČSL from the Moravian-Silesian Region.

Niemiec belongs to the Polish minority in the Czech Republic and is a member of the Polish Cultural and Educational Union (PZKO).
