= Bogumiła Lisocka-Jaegermann =

Polish social scientist and writer

Bogumiła Lisocka-Jaegermann (born 1956) is a Polish social scientist and writer, specialising in the fields of history and development of the Third World and developing countries. Most of her works focus on Latin American history, social and economic development. She is currently working for the Institute of Regional and Global Studies (Department of Geography) of the Warsaw University and Collegium Civitas. In the past she also collaborated with the Institute of History of the Polish Academy of Sciences.
