= Bohumil Mudřík =

Czech gymnast

- Born: 3 December 1941 (age 84) Zlín, Czechoslovakia

Gymnastics career
- Discipline: Men's artistic gymnastics
- Country represented: Czechoslovakia

Bohumil Mudřík (born 3 December 1941) is a Czech gymnast. He competed at the 1964 Summer Olympics, the 1968 Summer Olympics and the 1972 Summer Olympics.
