= Bogusław Dąbrowski =

Polish theologist, writer and Franciscan priest

Bogusław Dąbrowski (born 20 October 1966) is a Polish theologian, writer and Franciscan priest. He was one of the co-founders of the Franciscan mission in Uganda in 2001. His missionary work is described in his books: Burn the Passport (2015) and Breath of the Sun (2021).

== Early life ==
Dąbrowski completed a five-year program in construction at a technical school in Nowy Sącz. In 1993, he defended his master's thesis at the Pontifical Academy of Theology in Kraków (currently JPII University) under the supervision of Fr. Prof. Dr Hab. Józef Makselon. He undertook postgraduate studies at the Catholic University of Lublin in psychology and psychotherapy under the supervision of Fr. Professor Władysław Prężyna, which he completed with the work "Psychotherapeutic activity of a prison chaplain" based on his own research. In 2013, he defended his doctorate at Cardinal Stefan Wyszyński University in Warsaw, written under the supervision of Professor Jarosław Różański.

== Career ==
In 1986, Dąbrowski became a member of the Order of Conventual Franciscans of the Kraków Province, dedicated to St. Antoni Padewski and Blessed Jakub Strzemię. In the same year, he was ordained a priest and began parish work in Przemyśl, where, among others, he was the chaplain of the Penitentiary until 1998. In the years 1998-2000 he was the provincial assistant for vocations in the order.

Bogusław earned qualification as a ski and kayaking instructor, which he used to work with young people by organizing retreats and camps. In 2000, he organized the National Cycling Pilgrimage to Rome under the patronage of the Speaker of the Sejm of the Republic of Poland, Maciej Płażyński and Cardinal Franciszek Macharski.

In 2001, he went to the bush village of Kakooge, where he was a pioneer and co-founder of the Franciscan mission in Uganda. He worked at the mission in Uganda until September 2020. In 2021 he began working at Our Lady of the Angels Province USA as a confessor at the Sanctuary of St. Anthony in Ellicott City and for the Franciscan Missionary Society as a missionary preacher. Additionally, he celebrates masses at St. Joseph Nursing Home and Mount de Sales Academy in Catonsville.

In November 2023, Dąbrowski gave a lecture about the mission in Uganda for the Polish People's University (PUL).

== Publications ==
Dąbrowski is the author of books on African themes: Burn the Passport (2015) and Breath of the Sun (2021).

He published articles in the Droga, Bratni Zew, Posłaniec św. Antoniego and Wychowawca. His scientific publications include:

- Perception of suffering and attitude towards euthanasia based on medical staff's own research. Pontifical Academy of Theology, Kraków, 1993, pp. 120.
- The specificity of inculturation evangelization of the Baganda ethnic group on the example of the Kasana-Luweero diocese, UKSW, Warsaw 2014, pp. 320.
- Franciscan retreat with nature, article in the Bulletin of the Ecological Movement of St. Francis of Assisi - REFA Green Notebook 2000, Kraków, pp. 32–34.
- "History of the mission of the Conventual Franciscans in Uganda," article in Zeszyty Misjologiczne "Lumen Gentium, issue 2 / Warsaw 2011, pp. 151-169.
- Problems of loneliness in monastic life, article in "Consecrated Life", May–June 3 (137) 2019, Wrocław, pp. 133–137.
- Twenty years of the existence of the mission of the Conventual Franciscans in Uganda, " article in "Nurt Franciszkański" in issue 28 (2022), Kraków, pp. 111–130.
