= Bogomil Pavlov =

Bulgarian ski jumper (born 1992)

Bogomil Pavlov (Bulgarian: Богомил Павлов), born 18 February 1992 is a Bulgarian ski jumper competing for Ski Club Moten. Pavlov's best result so far is a 28th place in PyongChang and in Continental Cup 2009. Pavlov has also competed in some World Cup qualifications, but has never made it into the final.
