= Bohumil Steigenhöfer =

Czech ice hockey player

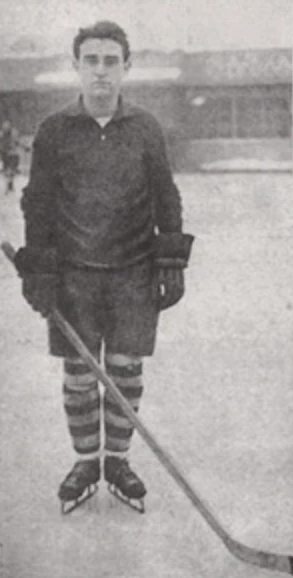

Personal information
- Nationality: Czech
- Born: 1 March 1905 Zbraslav, Bohemia, Austria-Hungary
- Died: 6 June 1989 (aged 84) Písek, Czechoslovakia

Sport
- Sport: Ice hockey

Bohumil Steigenhöfer (1 March 1905 – 6 June 1989) was a Czech ice hockey player who competed for Czechoslovakia. At 1928 Winter Olympics he participated with the Czechoslovak team in the Olympic tournament.
