= Bogusław Kanicki =

Polish volleyball player (born 1953)

Personal information
- Born: 9 July 1953 (age 72) Puławy, Poland
- Height: 196 cm (6 ft 5 in)
- Weight: 96 kg (212 lb)

Sport
- Country: Poland
- Sport: Volleyball
- Club: Resovia Rzeszów

Bogusław Kanicki (born 9 July 1953) is a Polish volleyball player. He competed in the men's tournament at the 1980 Summer Olympics.
