= Bogusław Wróblewski =

Bogusław Wróblewski (born 1955 in Lubartów) is a critic, literary scholar, and translator. He earned his doctorate in 1986 from Maria Curie-Skłodowska University, where he is at present an assistant professor in the Department of Polish Language and Literature. He is the founder (1980) and editor-in-chief of the quarterly arts and literature magazine, Akcent.
