= Bogusław Pawłowski =

Polish biologist

- Born: June 8, 1962 (age 64); Prudnik
- Citizenship: Poland
- Education: University of Wrocław (Ph.D.)
- Scientific career
- Fields: biological anthropology
- Workplaces: University of Wrocław
- Thesis: Ewolucyjne uwarunkowania zachowań płciowych i wybranych żeńskich cech morfologicznych w filogenezie człowieka (1996)
- Doctoral advisor: Tadeusz Krupiński

Bogusław Pawłowski (Polish pronunciation: [bɔˈɡus.waf pavˈwɔf.ski]; born 8 June 1962) is a Polish biologist and professor of biological sciences at the University of Wrocław. President of European Human Behaviour and Evolution Association (EHBEA).

He was born in Prudnik. In 1996, he received his PhD in biology from the University of Wroclaw. He completed his habilitation on 22 December 2003. Pawłowski deals with the mechanisms of human evolution and the biological background of human behavior and preferences.

== Works ==
- Pawłowski B., Ch. Lowen, R. Dunbar (1998) – Neocortex size, social skills and mating success in male primates, Behaviour, 135 (3): 357–368.
- Pawłowski B. (1999) – Loss of oestrus and concealed ovulation in human evolution: the case against the sexual-selection hypothesis, Current Anthropology 40: 257–275.
- Pawłowski B., Dunbar R.I.M, Lipowicz A. (2000) – Tall men have more reproductive success. Nature 403: 156.
- Pawłowski B. (2001) – The evolution of gluteal/femoral fat deposits and balance during pregnancy in bipedal Homo, Current Anthropology, 42: 572–574.
- Pawlowski B., Kozieł S. (2002) The impact of traits offered in personal advertisements on response rates. Evolution and Human Behavior 23:139-149.
- Pawlowski B., Grabarczyk M. (2003) Center of body mass and the evolution of female body shape. American Journal of Human Biology 15:144-150.
- Pawlowski B. (2003) Variable preferences for sexual dimorphism in height as a strategy for increasing the pool of potential partners in humans. Proceedings of the Royal Society, London B., 270:709-712.
- Pawlowski B., Jasieńska G. (2005) Women's preferences for sexual dimorphism in height depend on menstrual cycle phase and expected duration of relationship. Biological Psychology 70(1):38-43.
- Pawłowski B., Nowak J., Borkowska B, Augustyniak D., Drulis-Kawa Z. (2017) Body height and immune efficacy: testing body stature as a signal of biological quality. Proceedings of the Royal Society B-Biological Sciences. 284:20171372.
- Pawłowski B., Żelaźniewicz A. (2021) The evolution of perennially enlarged breasts in women: a critical review and a novel hypothesis. Biological Reviews 96: 2794-2809.

== Awards ==
- 2016: Gold Cross of Merit
- 2017: Medal of the National Education Commission
