= Bogumil Goltz =

German humorist and satirist (1801–1870)

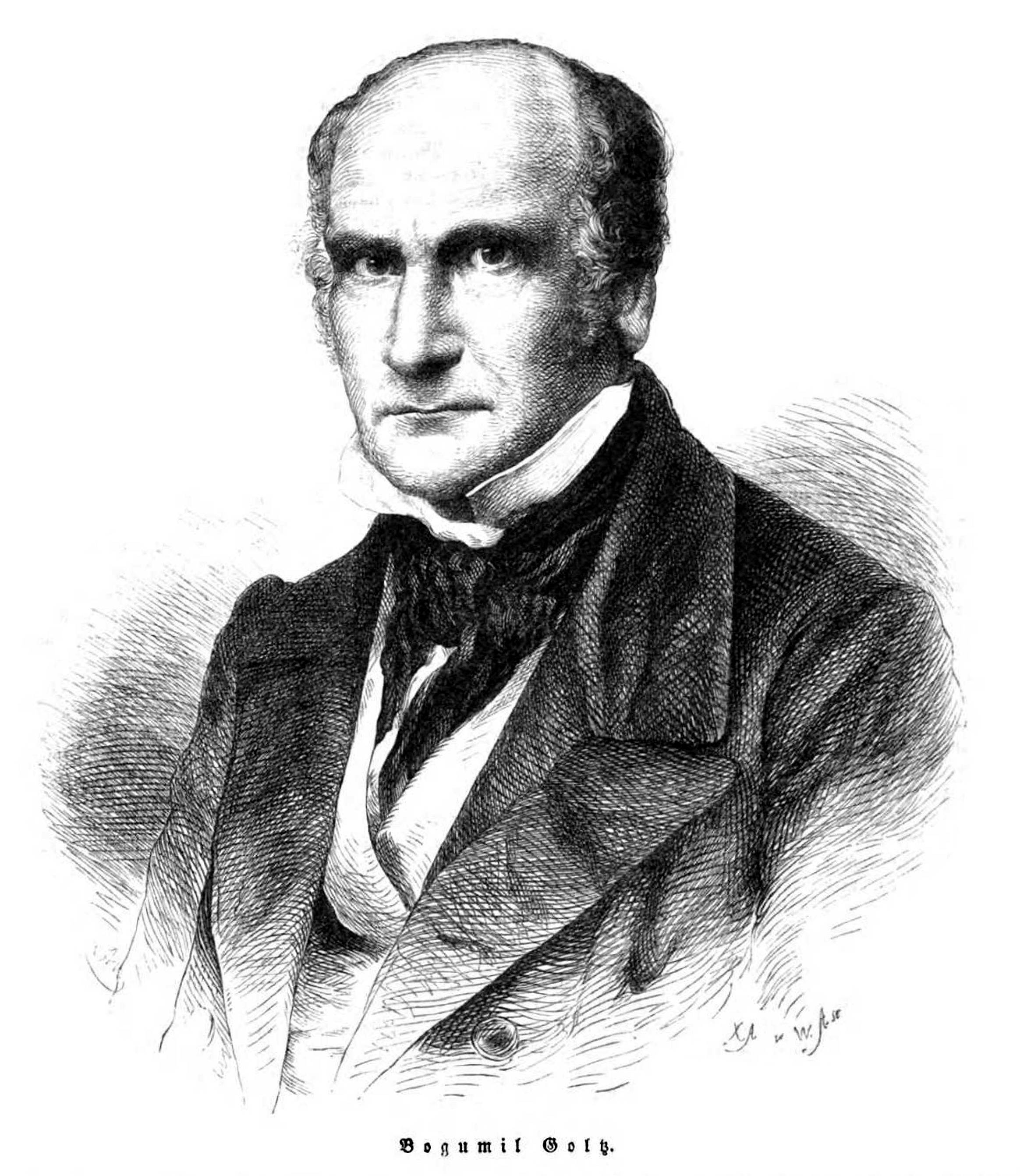

Bogumil Goltz (20 March 1801 – 12 November 1870) was a German humorist and satirist known mostly for his work Buch der Kindheit ("Book of Childhood").

== Biography ==
He was born in Warsaw. After attending the classical schools of Marienwerder and Königsberg, he learned farming on an estate near Thorn, and in 1821 entered the University of Breslau as a student of philosophy. But he soon abandoned an academic career and, after returning for a while to country life, retired to the small town of Gollub, where he devoted himself to literary studies. In 1847 he settled at Thorn, the home of Copernicus, where he died.

== Writings ==
Goltz is best known to literary fame by his Buch der Kindheit ("Book of Childhood", Frankfurt, 1847; 4th ed., Berlin, 1877), in which, after the style of Jean Paul and Adalbert Stifter, but with a more modern realism, he gives a charming and idyllic description of the impressions of his own childhood. Among his other works are Ein Jugendleben (1852); Der Mensch und die Leute (1858); Zur Charakteristik und Naturgeschichte der Frauen (1859); Zur Geschichte und Charakteristik des deutschen Genius (1864), and Die Weltklugheit und die Lebensweisheit (1869). Goltz's works have not been collected, but a selection will be found in Reclam's Universalbibliothek (edited by P. Stein, 1901 and 1906).
