= Bohumil Müller =

Czechoslovak religious leader

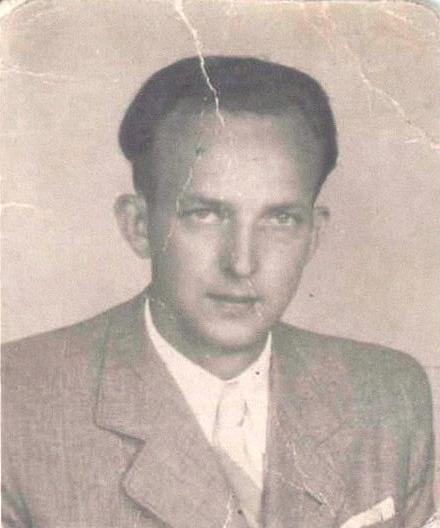
Bohumil Müller (1915–1987)

Bohumil Müller (30 June 1915 – 7 November 1987) was a religious leader of Jehovah's Witnesses in Czechoslovakia during World War II and the communist period, when their activities were banned by the Nazis and later by the communists. He spent fourteen years in concentration camps and communist prisons.

== Early life ==
Müller was born in 1915 to Czech parents in Zbiroh, central Bohemia, some 30 miles west of Prague. His father, Tomáš Müller, was a leading member of the Unity of Brethren church, but the family converted to Jehovah's Witnesses in 1931. Bohumil was 16 at the time and learning to be a typesetter while his brother, Karel, was learning bookbinding.

Young Bohumil became very active in his faith and shortly after conversion he started working in the main office of Jehovah's Witnesses in Prague. He progressed very quickly within the organisation, gaining greater responsibility. The Witnesses at that time used two legal corporations to facilitate their religious activities. In 1936, at the age of 21, Müller was elected a director of the International Bible Students Association, Czechoslovak Branch, and vice-director of the Watch Tower Bible and Tract Society, Czechoslovak Branch.

Müller was called to report for military service on 1 October 1937. He later wrote: “My conscience, however, told me that God does not want his servants to ‘learn war’ (Isaiah 2: 4).” Consequently, he refused to serve and was arrested, becoming the first person imprisoned in Czechoslovakia for his Christian beliefs as a conscientious objector. Between October 1937 and the end of March 1939, he had been arrested four times, serving several months in prison each time.

== Nazi period ==
On 1 April 1939 Müller was released from prison after serving his fourth term. Meanwhile, two weeks previously, on 15 March 1939, Nazi German forces had invaded and occupied all of Bohemia and Moravia. Müller reported back to his office and found many were fleeing Czechoslovakia before the Gestapo could arrest them. He, too, obtained a passport and was preparing to leave when word reached him asking him to stay and to prepare and co-ordinate the underground activities of Jehovah's Witnesses in occupied Czechoslovakia. He accepted and took on the responsibility of providing leadership during extraordinarily difficult times.

In 1941 Müller was discovered and arrested, after which he was sent to Mauthausen concentration camp. Years later he wrote of his time in the camp. The Witnesses could have been released if they would only sign a form renouncing their faith. The SS tried different tactics to get them to sign, but very few did so. After describing various unspeakable tortures he underwent in the course of his four years in Mauthausen, he said: “Towards the end of 1944 Himmler’s special deputy, SS-Hauptsturmbannführer Kramer, came from Berlin to try and persuade us to sign, with various promises and smooth talk. When he met with the decisively adverse attitude of the Witnesses, repressions against us started. We were distributed into blocks, so that nowhere would two brothers [Witnesses] live together. The camp commander published an order that kapos and Blockälteste block elders were to watch us so that we would not go out of the blocks, and the other prisoners were allowed by a special command to kill us should they ever see two of us together.” Still he survived, and was released when the camp was liberated.

== Communist period ==
Müller was one of the first Witnesses to return home. He began the process of trying to re-establish contact with Witnesses both inside Czechoslovakia and outside. Once communication with the outside was established, Müller was appointed co-ordinator for the Jehovah's Witnesses in Czechoslovakia in November 1945.

Thus began a three-year period of relative peace for the Witnesses in Czechoslovakia. After the end of Nazi occupation and before the full imposition of communism they were granted their freedom and took full advantage of it. However, on 28 November 1948 officials of the State Security visited the Witnesses’ office in Prague and arrested Müller and the rest of the office staff, and commandeered their building. However, in July 1949 the State Court stopped the criminal proceedings on account of lack of evidence, and released the prisoners. But as they were leaving the court they were arrested again and informed of a decision by the Communist Political Commission that they were to be sent to a labour camp for two years. Müller was sent to Kladno, where he worked in a coal mine.

Suddenly, early in 1950 all Jehovah's Witnesses were released from labour camps and they experienced a brief reprieve from their persecution. Then in the early hours of 4 February 1952, in a major crackdown, Müller and 108 other Witnesses were arrested. For the next fourteen months Müller was not allowed out of solitary confinement without a blindfold and subjected to long interrogations. Then on 27 and 28 March 1953 a show trial was held. The Communist Party newspaper Rudé Právo (The Red Law), of 30 March 1953 reported on the results. Under a dateline, Prague, 29 March (CTK), it said: “On trial were the leading members of a religious sect whose adherents call themselves Jehovah’s Witnesses. This organisation, directed in Brooklyn, USA, and which has been banned in our country since 1949 for its destructive tendencies, has smuggled into Czechoslovakia cosmopolitan ideologies which, under the veil of pure Christianity, are designed to undermine the morale of our working masses.” Müller was sentenced to eighteen years imprisonment; others were given lesser sentences.

In May 1960 he and the others were freed as part of a large-scale amnesty for political prisoners. He continued to direct the activities of the Jehovah's Witnesses in Czechoslovakia until his death in 1987.
