= Bohumila Bloudilová =

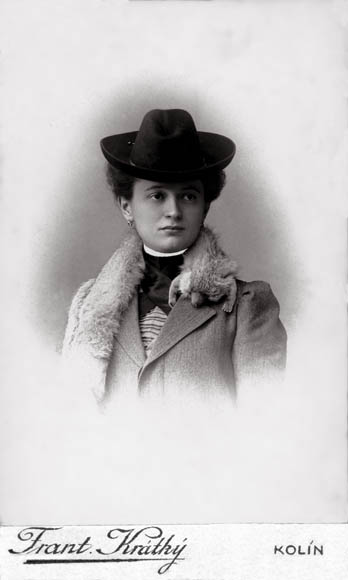
- Bohumila Bloudilová circa 1900, photograph by František Krátký; Scheufler Collection
- Born: March 19, 1876; Ceske Vrbne, Austria-Hungary
- Died: August 11, 1946 (aged 70); Kolín, Czechoslovakia
- Known for: Photography

Bohumila Bloudilová (March 19, 1876 – August 11, 1946) was a Czech portrait photographer and cousin of Josef Sudek.

== Life and Career ==
Her father Jan married Anna Sudkova on February 15, 1873. From 1894, she worked in the František Krátký photography studio in Cologne, where she also studied. Since 1906, aged 30, she operated her own studio in Kolín.

The studio had an area of about sixty square meters, a contemporary period studio furnished for daylight photography, with a glass wall facing north. The studio ceased to operate on July 1, 1932.
