= Bohumil Smolík =

Czech footballer

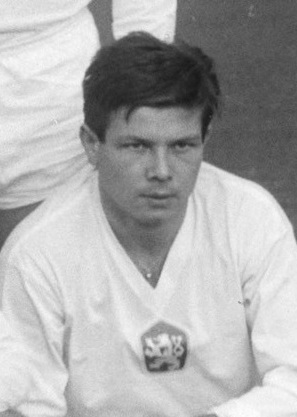
- Smolík in 1966

Personal information
- Date of birth: 8 April 1943
- Date of death: 29 September 2008 (aged 65)

International career
Years	Team	Apps	(Gls)
1965–1966	Czechoslovakia	8	(0)

Bohumil Smolík (8 April 1943 – 29 September 2008) was a Czech footballer. He played in eight matches for the Czechoslovakia national football team in 1965 and 1966.
