= Bogusław Sobczak =

Polish politician

member of Sejm 2005-2007
- In office 25 September 2005 – 2007

Personal details
- Born: 25 June 1979 (age 46) Kraków, Poland
- Party: League of Polish Families

Bogusław Sobczak (born 25 June 1979 in Kraków) is a Polish politician. He was elected to the Sejm on 25 September 2005, getting 6480 votes in 15 Tarnów district as a candidate from the League of Polish Families list.

In 2004, he graduated from the University of Economics in Krakow with a degree in Economy and Public Administration. From 2003 to 2005 he worked in the Krakow City Hall.

In 1998 he joined the All-Polish Youth. From 2001 to 2002 he was the secretary, and until 2005 the vice-president of the general council of this organization. In the years 2004–2005, he was the president of the Małopolska district.

In the parliamentary elections in 2001, he unsuccessfully ran for the Sejm as a non-partisan, from the list of the League of Polish Families in the Warsaw constituency. Then he joined this group. In 2002, he unsuccessfully ran for a seat in the Małopolska Regional Assembly on behalf of the LPR.

== See also ==
- Members of Polish Sejm 2005-2007
