= Bohumil Povejšil =

Czech gymnast

- Born: 15 July 1912 Prague, Austria-Hungary
- Died: Prague

Gymnastics career
- Discipline: Men's artistic gymnastics
- Country represented: Czechoslovakia

Bohumil Povejšil (born 15 July 1912, date of death unknown) was a Czech gymnast. He competed in eight events at the 1936 Summer Olympics.
