= Bogusław Widawski =

Polish footballer

Personal information
- Date of birth: 23 February 1934
- Place of birth: Lwów, Poland
- Date of death: 8 February 1986 (aged 51)
- Place of death: Lubliniec, Poland
- Height: 1.83 m (6 ft 0 in)
- Position: Defender

Senior career*
Years	Team	Apps	(Gls)
1953–1966	Polonia Bytom		

International career
1959	Poland	1	(0)

Managerial career
- 1972–1974: Piast Gliwice
- * Club domestic league appearances and goals

Bogusław Widawski (23 February 1934 – 8 February 1986) was a Polish footballer who played as a defender.

He earned one cap for the Poland national team in 1959.

== Honours ==
Polonia Bytom

- Ekstraklasa: 1954
