= Bogumił Strzyżewski =

Polish scientist (1933 – 2019)

- Born: Bogumił Sławomir Strzyżewski; April 6, 1933; Żuromin, Poland
- Died: December 28, 2019 (aged 86); Warsaw, Poland
- Awards: Cross of Merit

Bogumił Sławomir Strzyżewski (April 6, 1933, in Żuromin – December 28, 2019, in Warsaw) was a Polish specialist in the field of economics and organization of animal production, holding the title of professor with a Ph.D.

== Biography ==
Bogumił Sławomir Strzyżewski, the son of Włodzimierz and Czesława, defended his doctoral thesis and later obtained his habilitation based on his scientific achievements and work. On October 9, 1990, he was awarded the title of professor in the field of agricultural sciences. He worked at the Department of Specific Animal Breeding at the Faculty of Animal Sciences at the Warsaw University of Life Sciences.

From 1981 to 1987, he served as the vice-dean at the Faculty of Zootechnics at the Warsaw University of Life Sciences, and from 1980 to 2003, he was the head of the Department of Economics and Organization of Animal Production.

He died on December 28, 2019.

== Honors ==
- Honorary Badge "Meritorious for Agriculture"
- Honorary Badge "For Merits for Warsaw University of Life Sciences (SGGW)"
- Medal of the Commission of National Education
- Gold Cross of Merit

== Works ==
- 1976: "The Influence of Herd Size and Applied Animal Production Technology on the Level of Labor Inputs in Individual Farms" ("Wpływ wielkości stada i zastosowanej technologii produkcji zwierzęcej na poziom nakładów robocizny w gospodarstwach indywidualnych".)
- 1982: "Specialization of Individual Farms in Animal Production" / Stefan Mandecki, Barbara Lewandowska, Bogumił Strzyżewski; Polish Academy of Sciences, Faculty of Agricultural and Forestry Sciences ("Specjalizacja gospodarstw indywidualnych w produkcji zwierzęcej / Stefan Mandecki, Barbara Lewandowska, Bogumił Strzyżewski; Polska Akademia Nauk, Wydział Nauk Rolniczych i Leśnych".)
- 1999: "Economics and Organization of Animal Production: Tables for Exercises" / collective work under the guidance of Bogumił Strzyżewski; authors: Bożena Wojtyra et al.; Warsaw University of Life Sciences, Department of Specific Animal Breeding, Department of Economics and Organization of Animal Production ("Ekonomika i organizacja produkcji zwierzęcej : tabele do ćwiczeń : [praca zbiorowa / pod kierunkiem Bogumiła Strzyżewskiego; aut. Bożena Wojtyra et al.]; Szkoła Główna Gospodarstwa Wiejskiego. Katedra Szczegółowej Hodowli Zwierząt. Zakład Ekonomiki i Organizacji Produkcji Zwierzęcej".)
