= Bohumil Prošek =

Czech ice hockey player

Bohumil Prošek (26 March 1931 – 30 August 2014) was a Czech ice hockey player who competed for Czechoslovakia in the 1956 Winter Olympics. He was born in Kladno, Czechoslovakia.
