= Bohumil Zemánek =

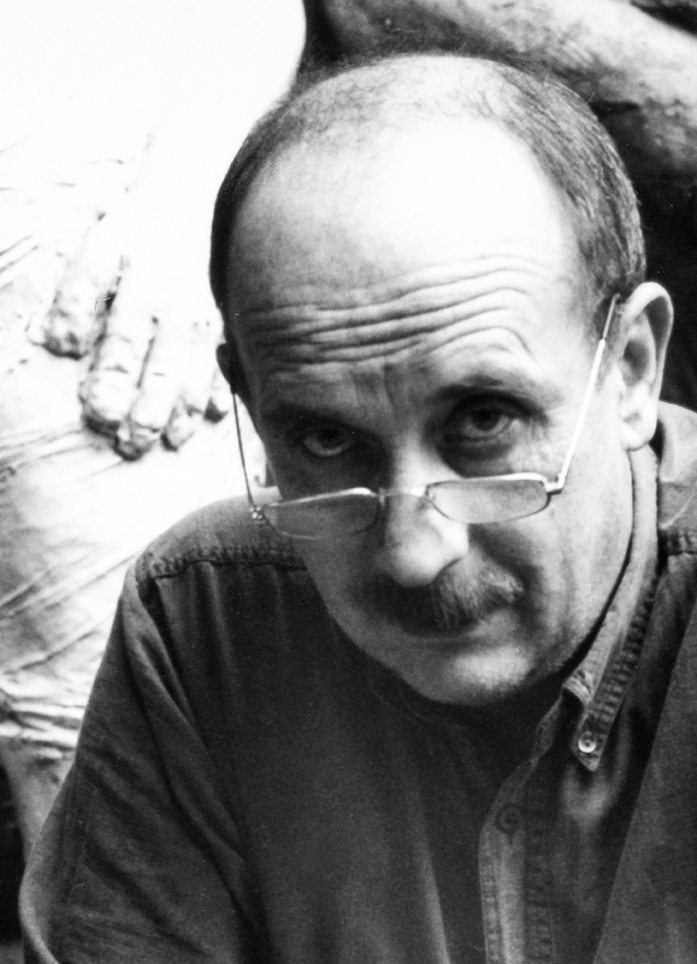
Bohumil Zemánek in his studio

Bohumil Zemanek (10 October 1942 in Brno – 12 August 1996 in Prague) was a Czech sculptor and restorer.

== Biography ==
He was born in Brno as the second son of three children of Bohumír Zemánek, a professional soldier, and his wife Anna Zemánková, who later became famous as an important Czech author of art brut.

From 1964 to 1970 he studied at the Academy of Fine Arts in Prague in the studio of prof. Karel Hladík and later doc. Jiří Bradáček. There he also met his future wife, sculptor and restorer Markéta Paurová. In 1975, the couple had a daughter, Terezie Zemánková.

His work was not in line with the cultural policy of the normalisation regime and therefore he exhibited only sporadically before 1989. Together with the sculptor Michael Bílek, he devoted himself intensively to the restoration of stone sculptural monuments, mainly in North Bohemia.

He was a member of the Mánes Society of Visual Artists.

== Works ==
He was influenced by American pop art. In the Czech milieu he belonged, together with Karel Nepraš, Jiří Sopko or Jiří Načeradský, to the distinctive personalities of the New figuration (do not confuse with Figuration Libre) and the circle of the so-called "Czech grotesque". Already during his studies at the Academy of Fine Arts he formulated a clear artistic signature. From the beginning, he has focused on realistic figurative sculpture, mostly life-size and processed in a cast, but mainly in burnt umber, raw or glazed ceramic clay. His work is characterised by almost animalistic modelling, antiqued print drapery and frequently admitted joints of plaster forms.

Zemánek's early work from the time of his studies had an expressive charge and the sculptor did not hesitate to treat a seemingly drab subject as an unkind grotesque (Kočárek, 1964). The sculpture Boxer was created in 1968 and is a distinctive reaction to the invasion of Czechoslovakia by Warsaw Pact troops. Zemánek's conception of the human figure, stylised into a kind of "folk archetype", is ironic. With humorous detachment, he pilloried petty bourgeois stereotypes (Before the Maid Katy Brings Fish Soup to the Table... 1968) and gluttony (Woman Julie - Dawn 1988–1989, Chess 1986–1987), trivialising the ideal of the working man (Bohouš 1979). Zemánek demythicizes to the point of ridicule. His subject is quite consistently the ordinary man of our days in his ordinary clothes and ordinary attitude, conceived so realistically that he stands there "as if alive". In reality, however, Zemánek monumentalises his character by his solid, taut and summarising modelling. Such a combination of human humour and artistic seriousness is rare in sculpture.

A frequent motif in his sculptures was water, which to him was a symbol of freedom, nature and the bliss of physical existence. It is used in the wet draperies glued to the plump bodies of his Women Julia, in sculptures of water games (Water Polo - with Jiří Sopko - 1970, Swimming Pool, 1968, Bath - with Karel Zavadil - 1967) and in a series of figures called The Sea (1981-1985). The wet draperies reveal provocatively intimate details, but the gestures and expressions are usually so infantile as to preclude provocative eroticism. Zemánek revelled in this kind of paradox, bridging the genre of his sculptures and sculptures towards humorous but more general metaphors about the human condition.

The fact that Zemánek remained his own is a matter of the particular constitution of his talent and his direct but distinctively motivated relationship to man and people, and thus the result of a certain reticence to the influences of current world currents. It also reflects the situation of Czech spiritual life with one of its typical artistic expressions - the figurative grotesque.

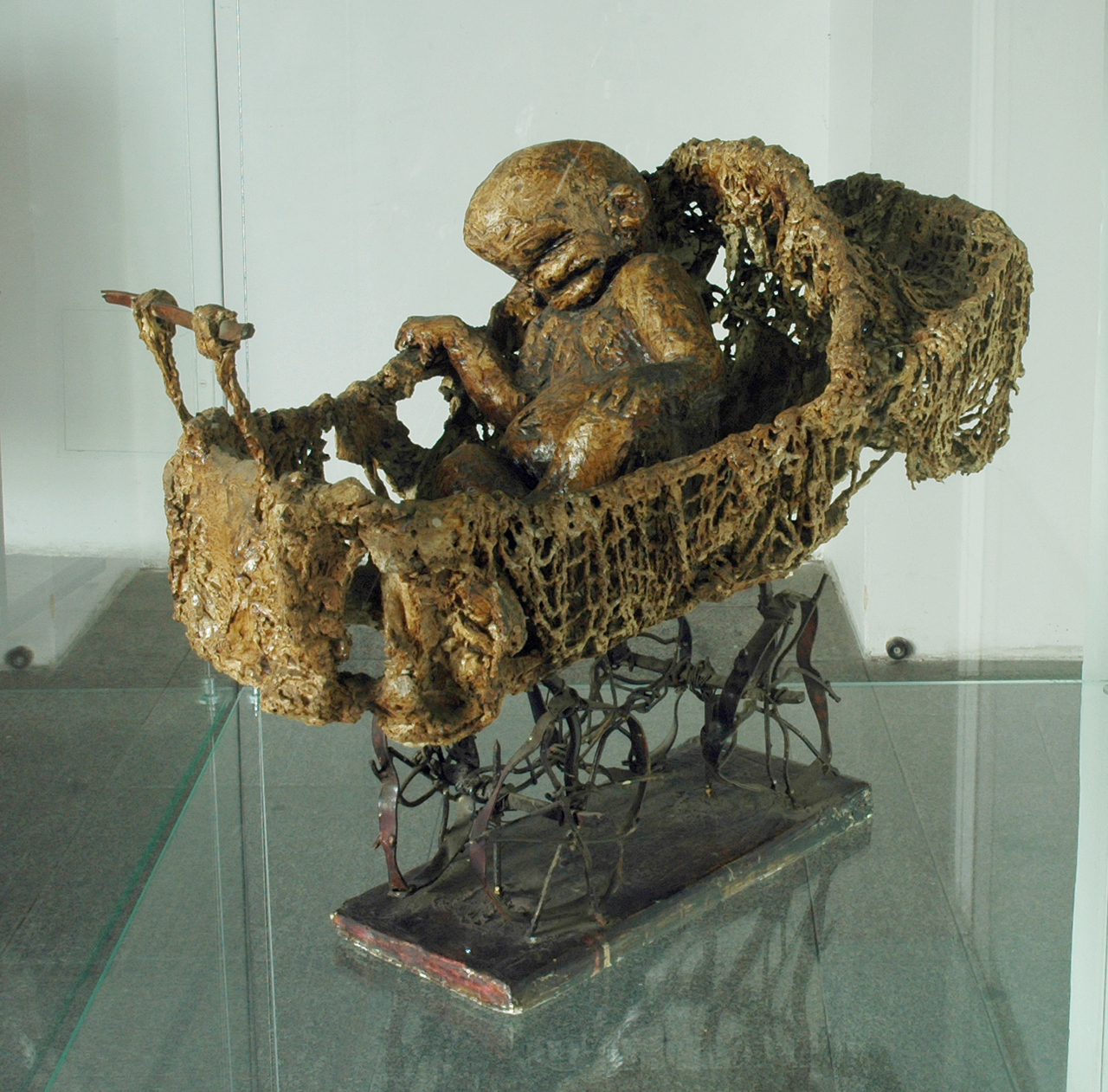
The Pram (1964)

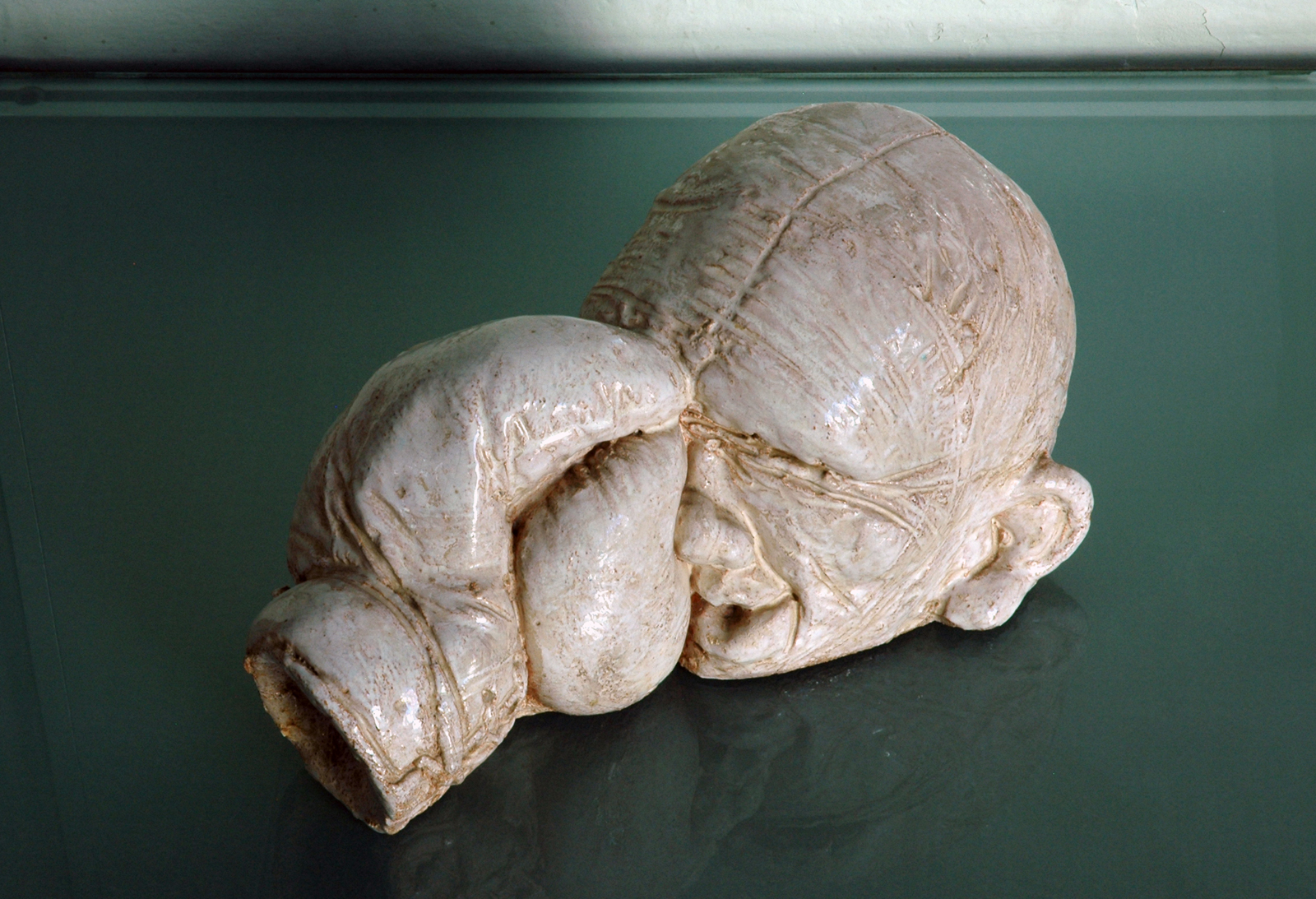
Boxer (1968)

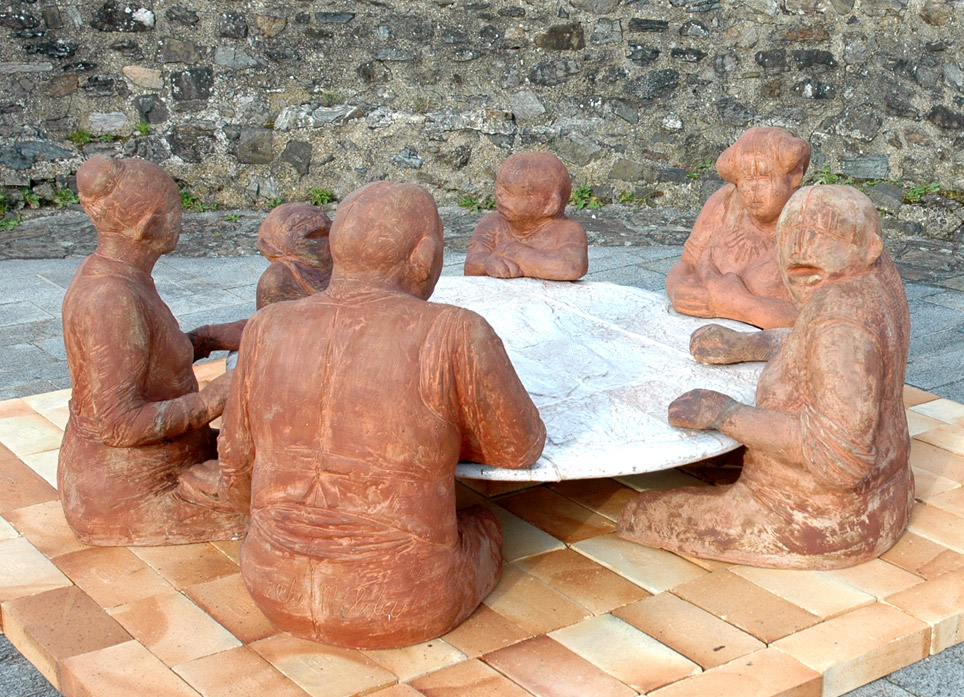
Before the Maid Katy Brings Fish Soup to the Table, baked clay, 1969–1970

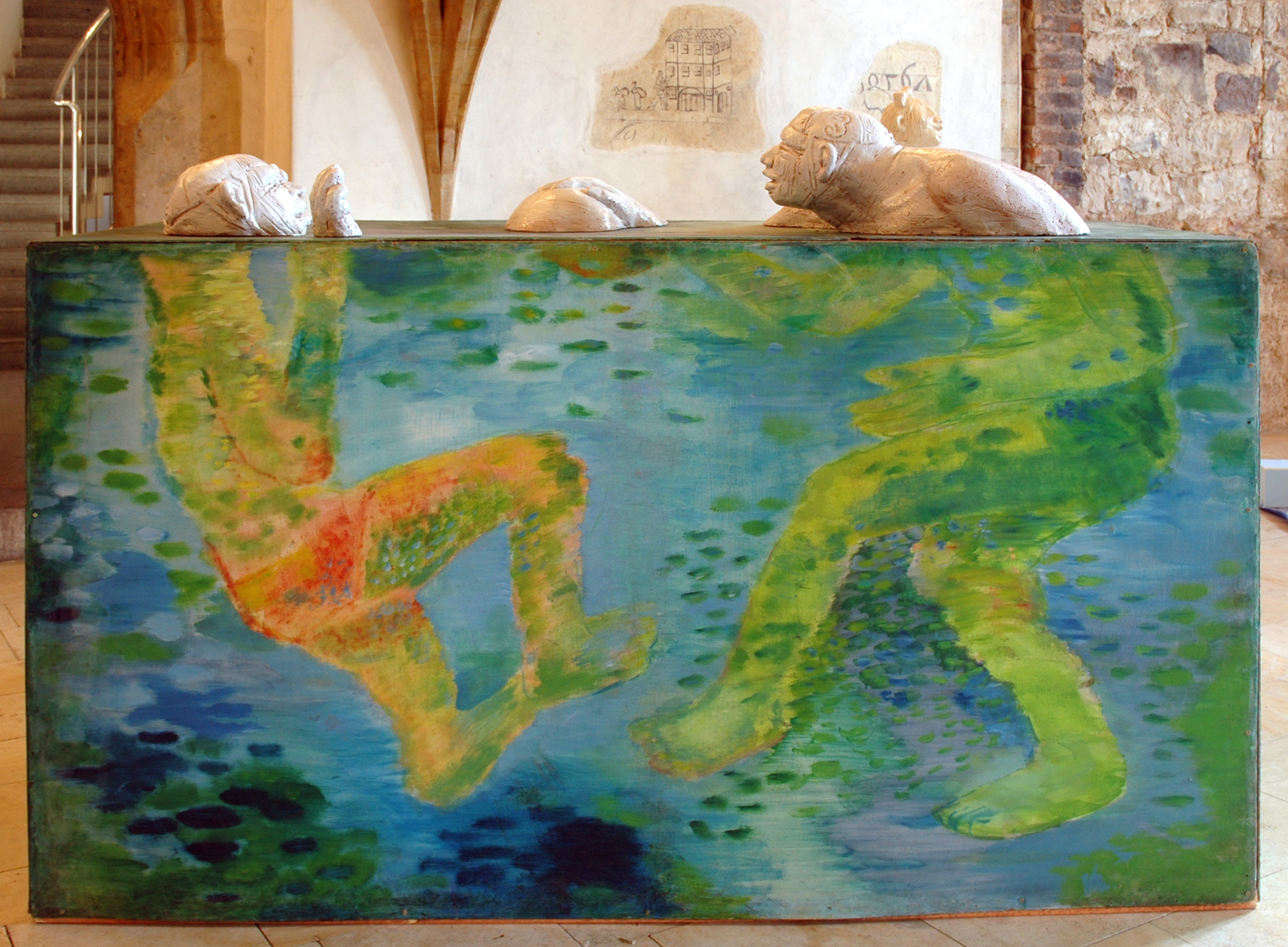
Water Polo (1970-1971)

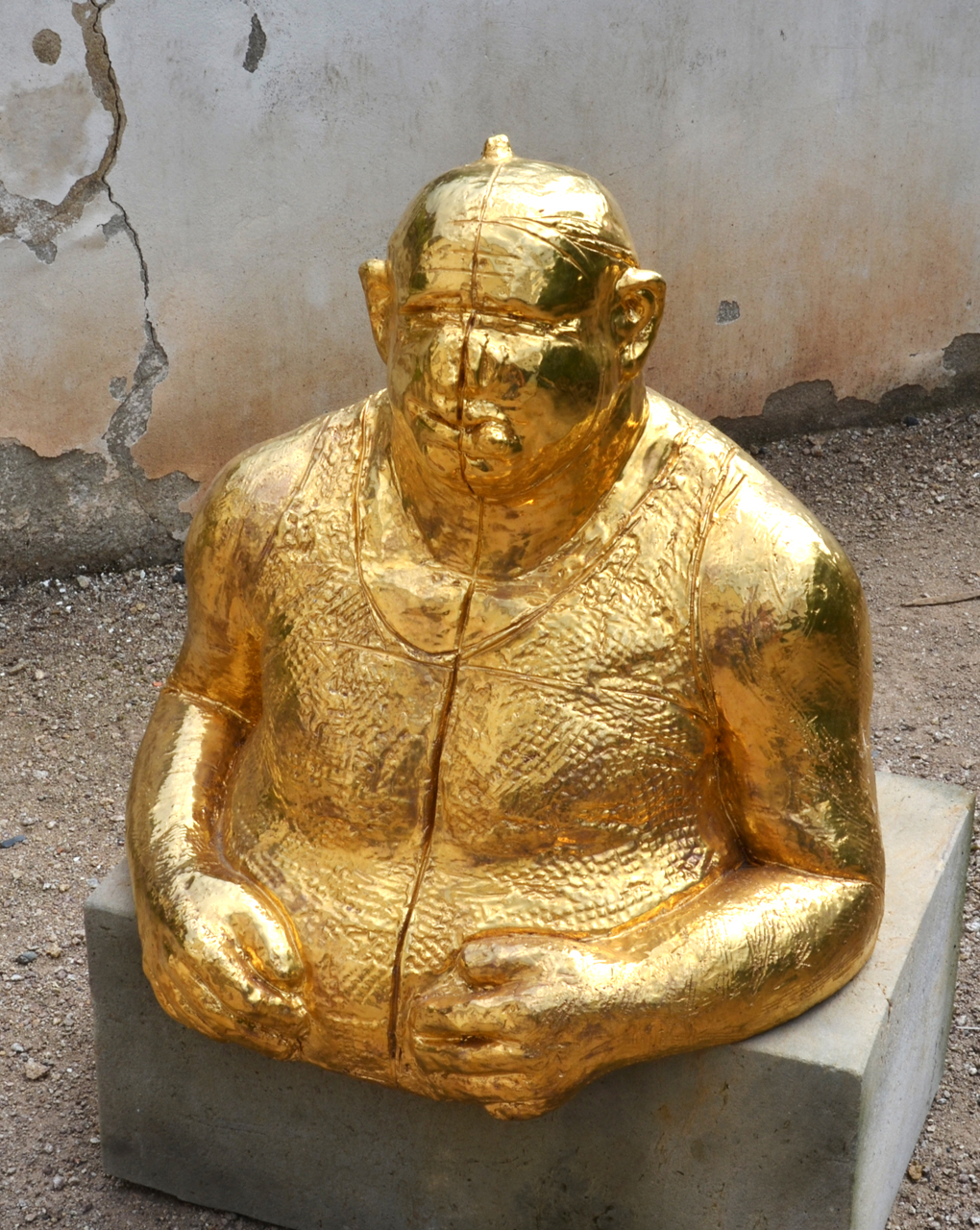
Béda, the Golden Boy (1972)

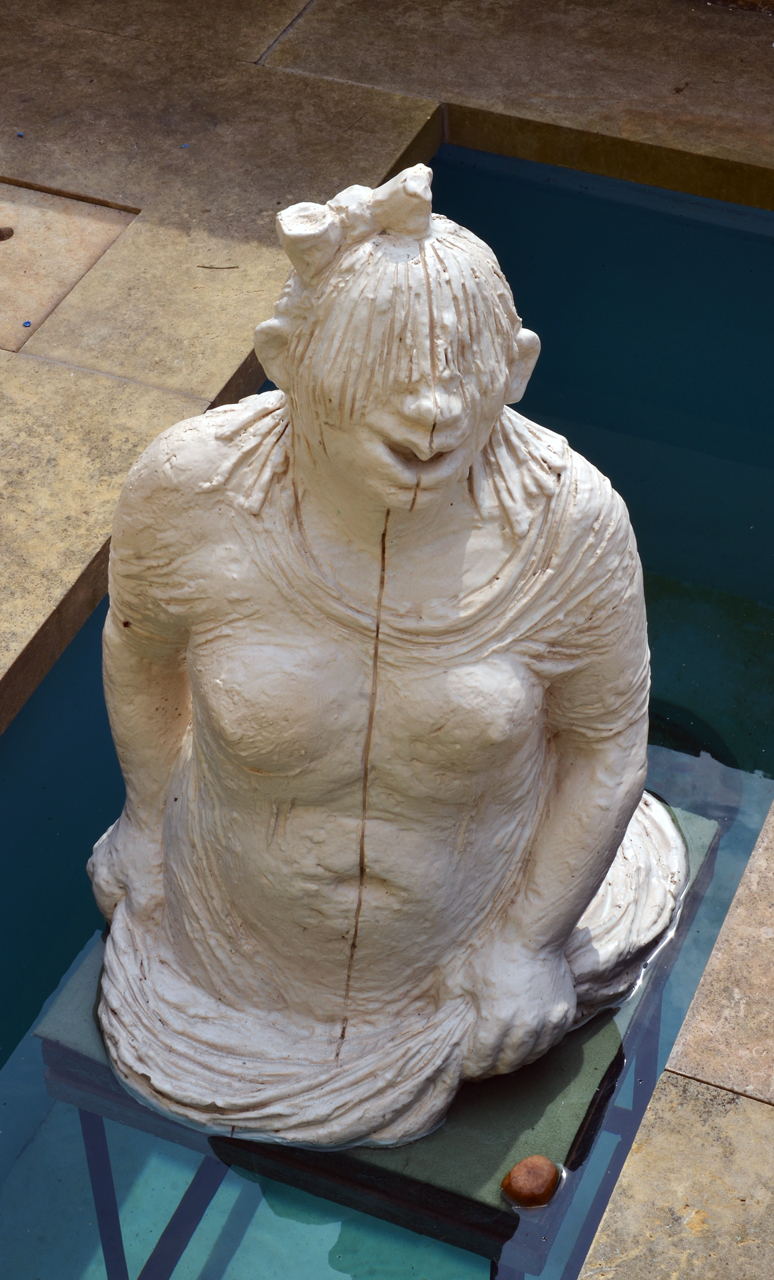
Wet Julia (1974)

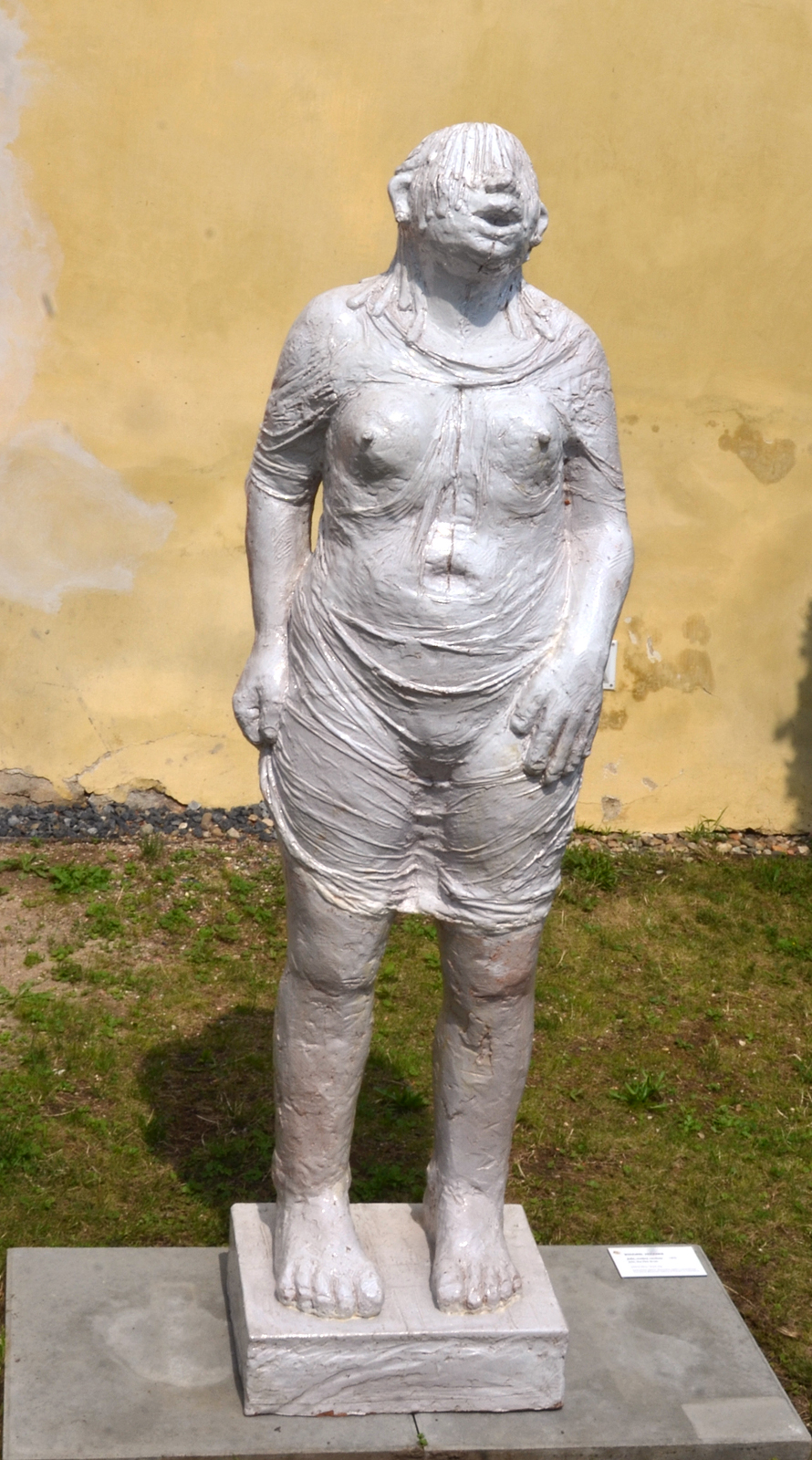
Julia, Wet Bride (1975)

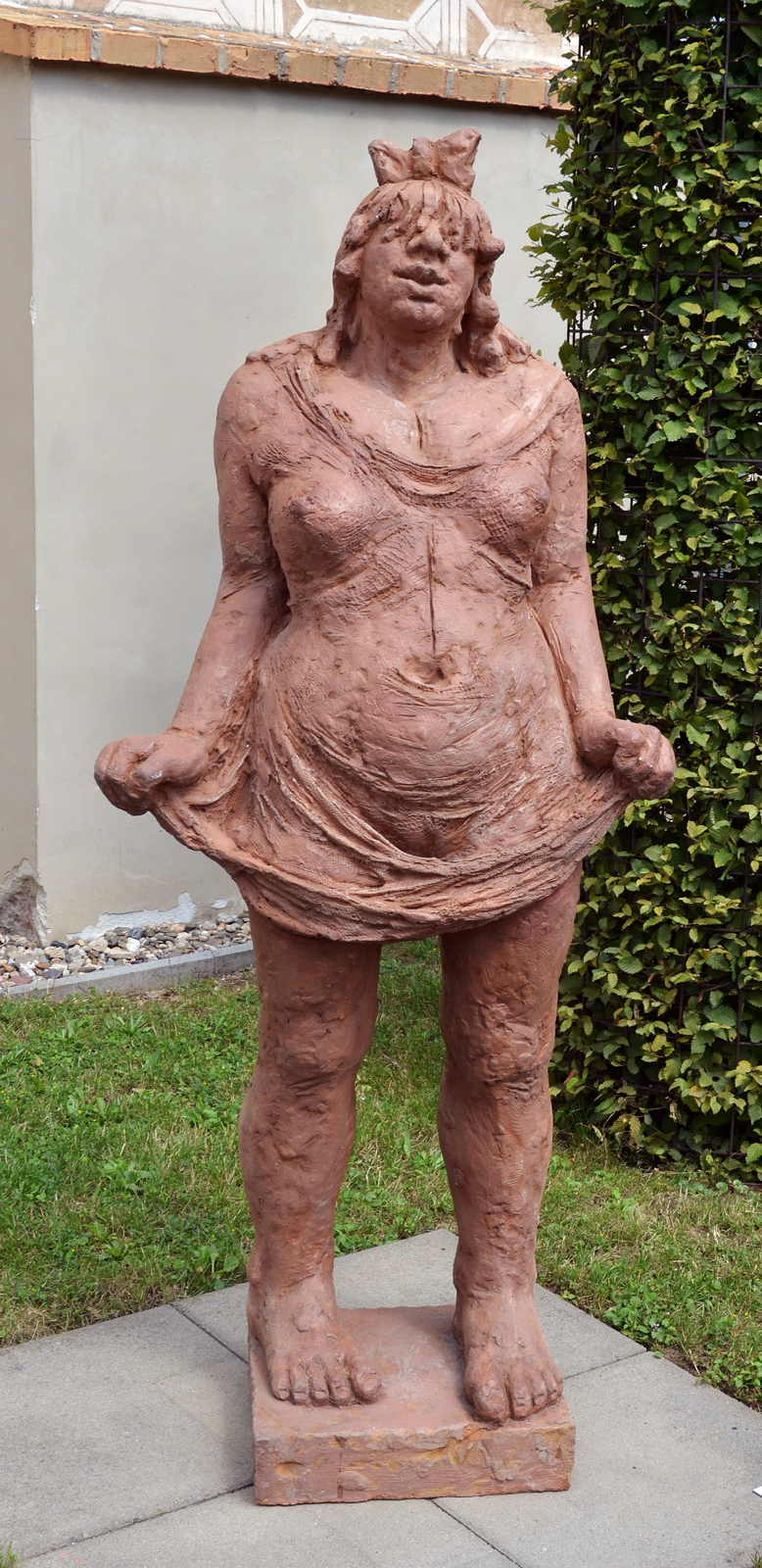
Julia, the dirty girl (1978)

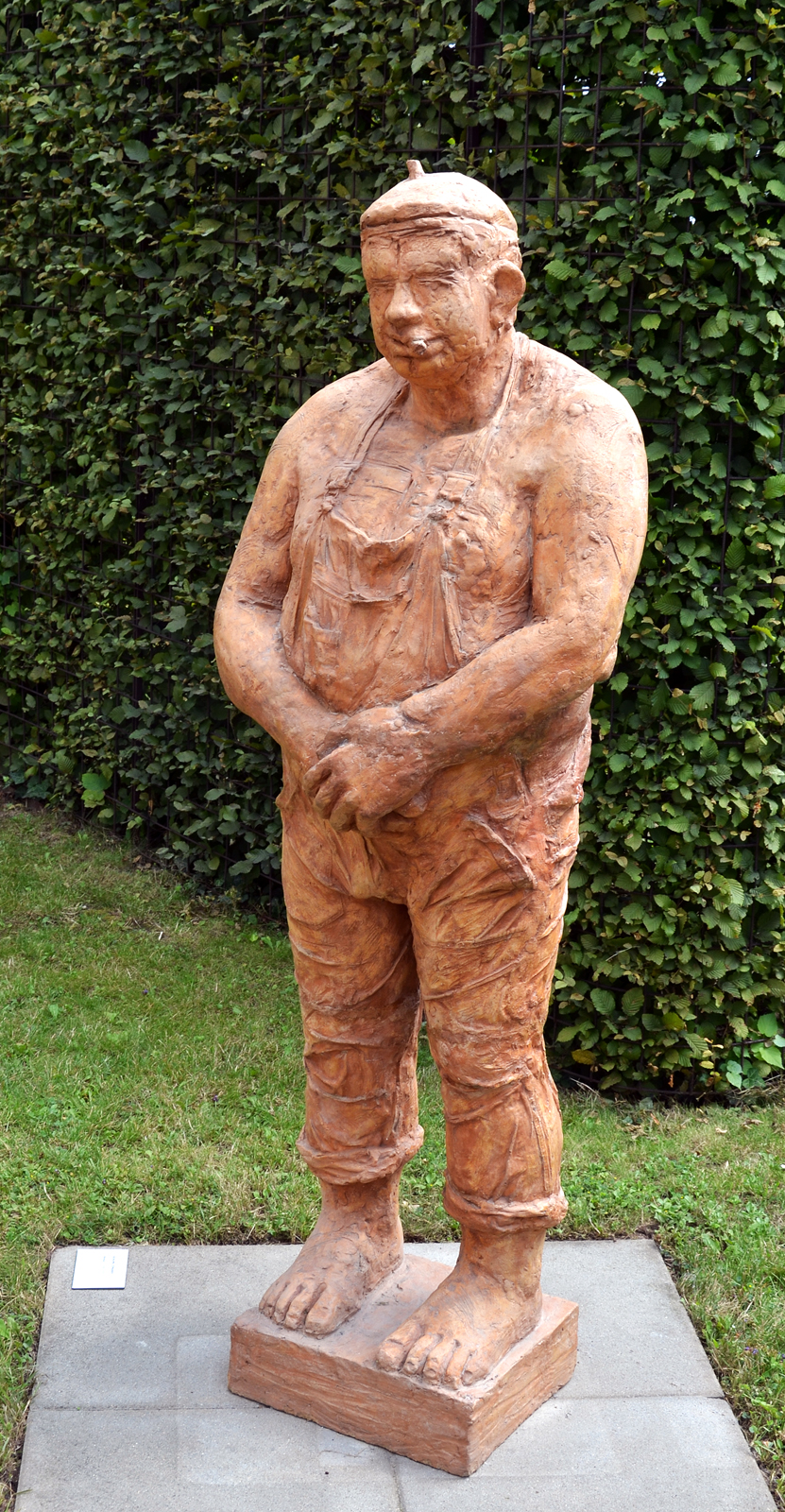
Bohouš (1979)

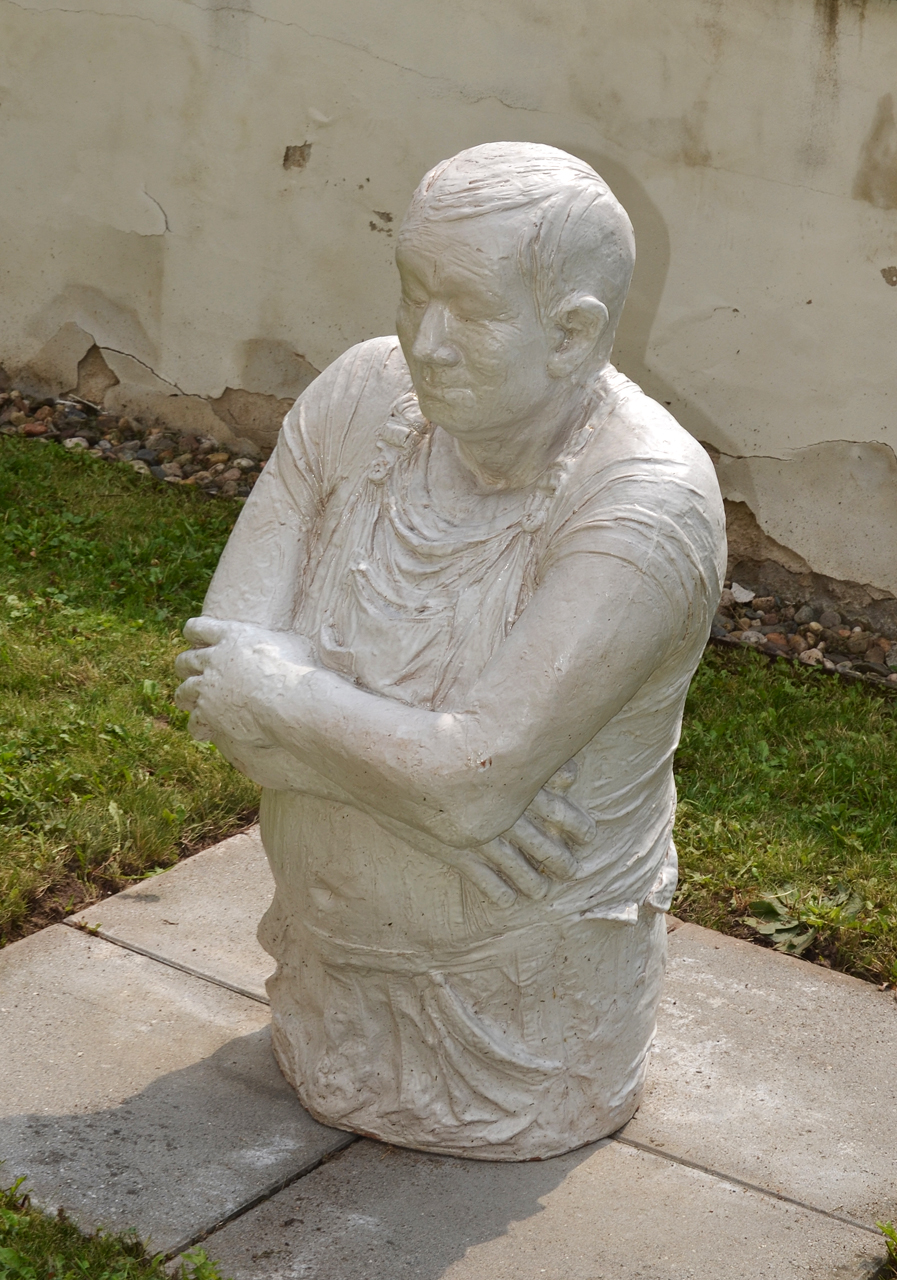
Bohouš II (1985-1986)

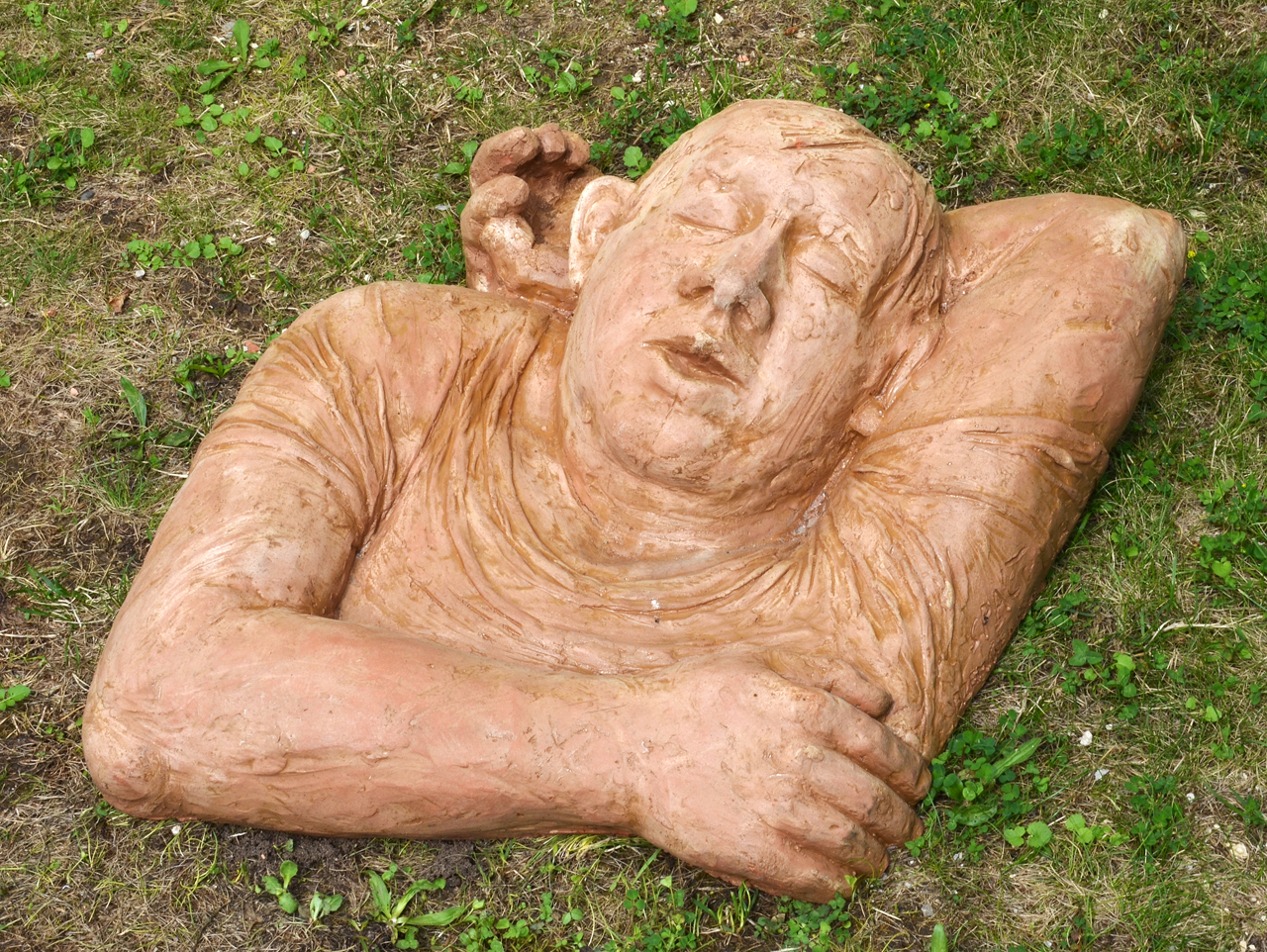
Sleeper I (1983-1984)

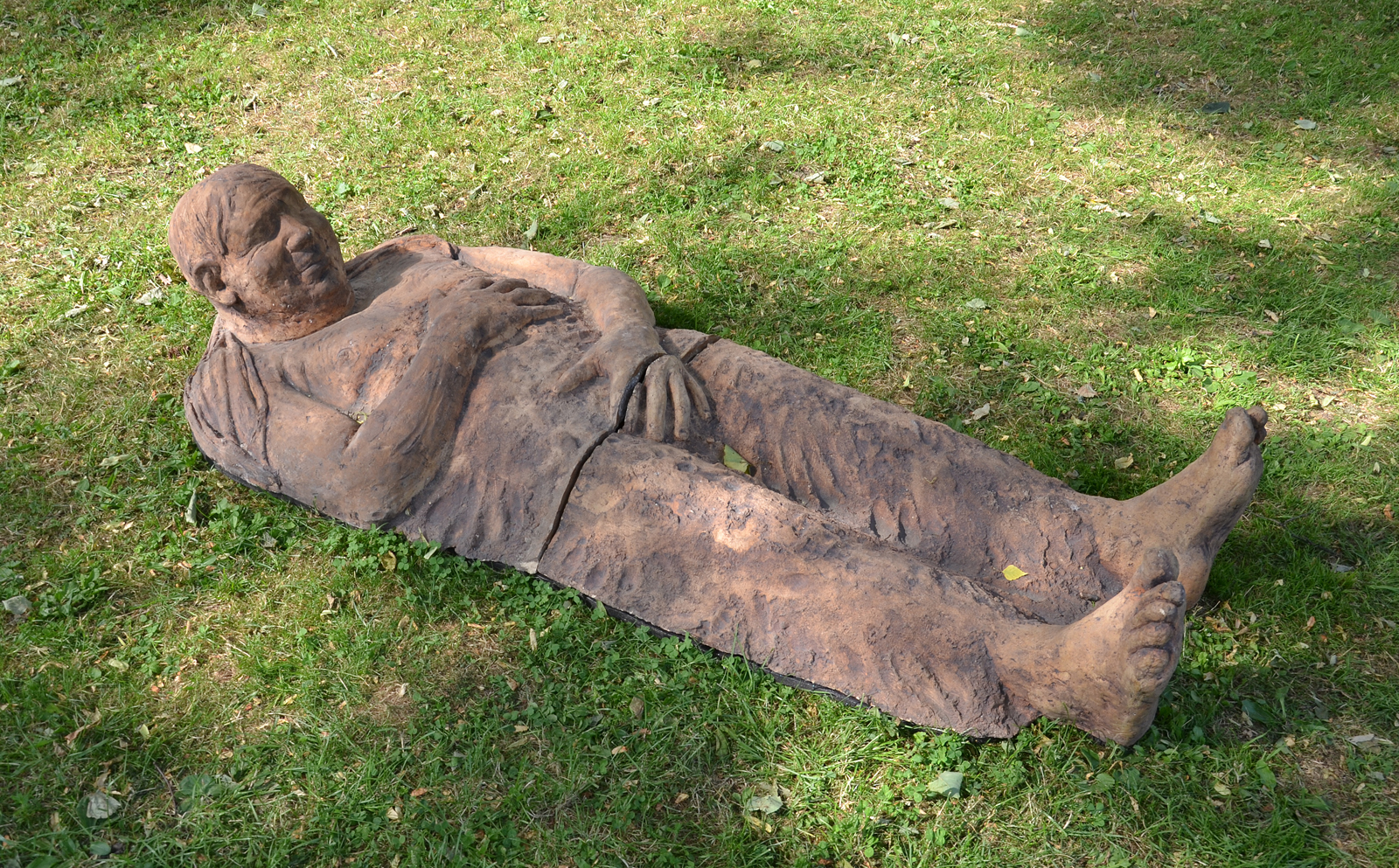
Sea III (1984-1985)

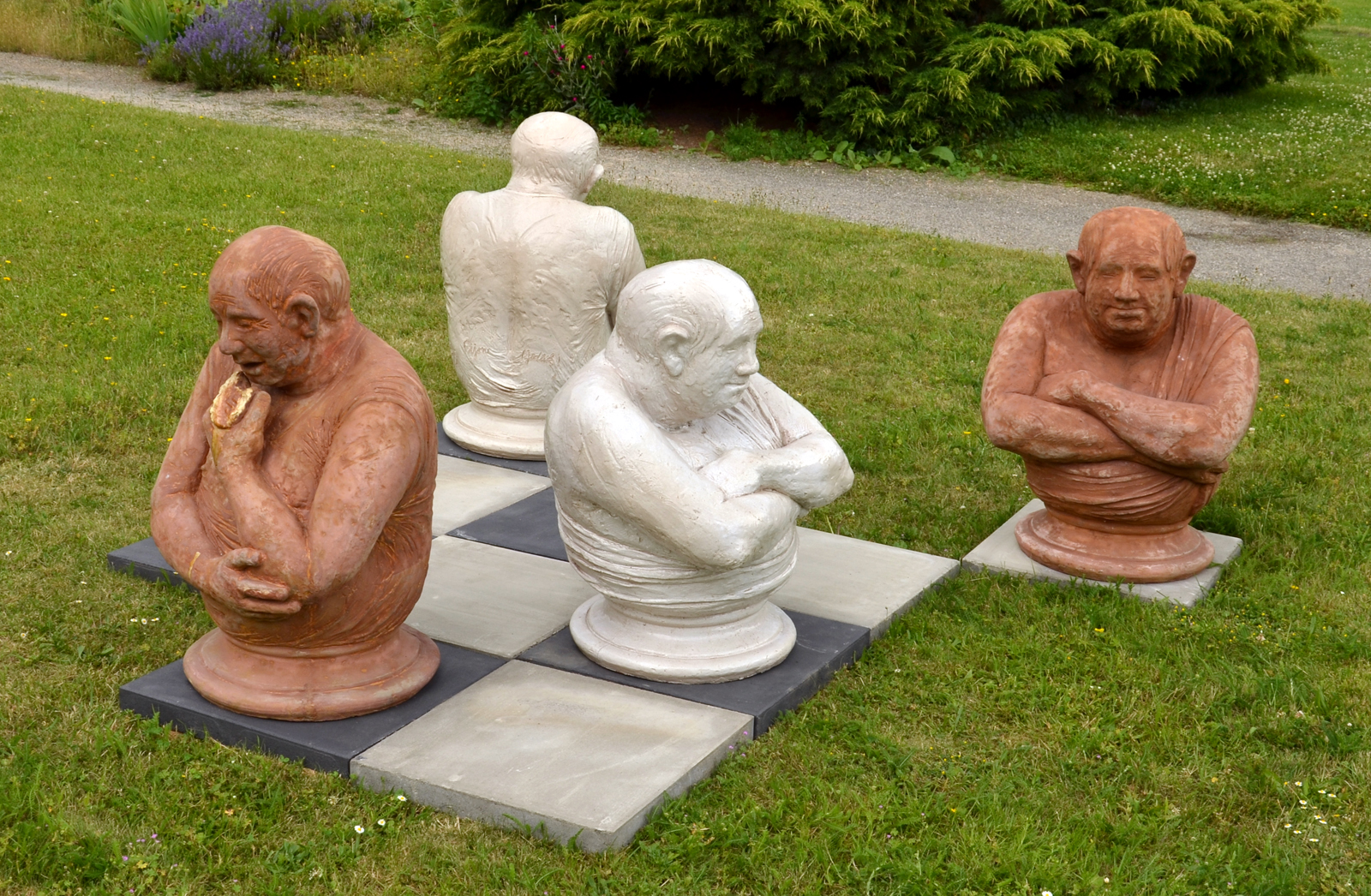
Chess (1986-1987)

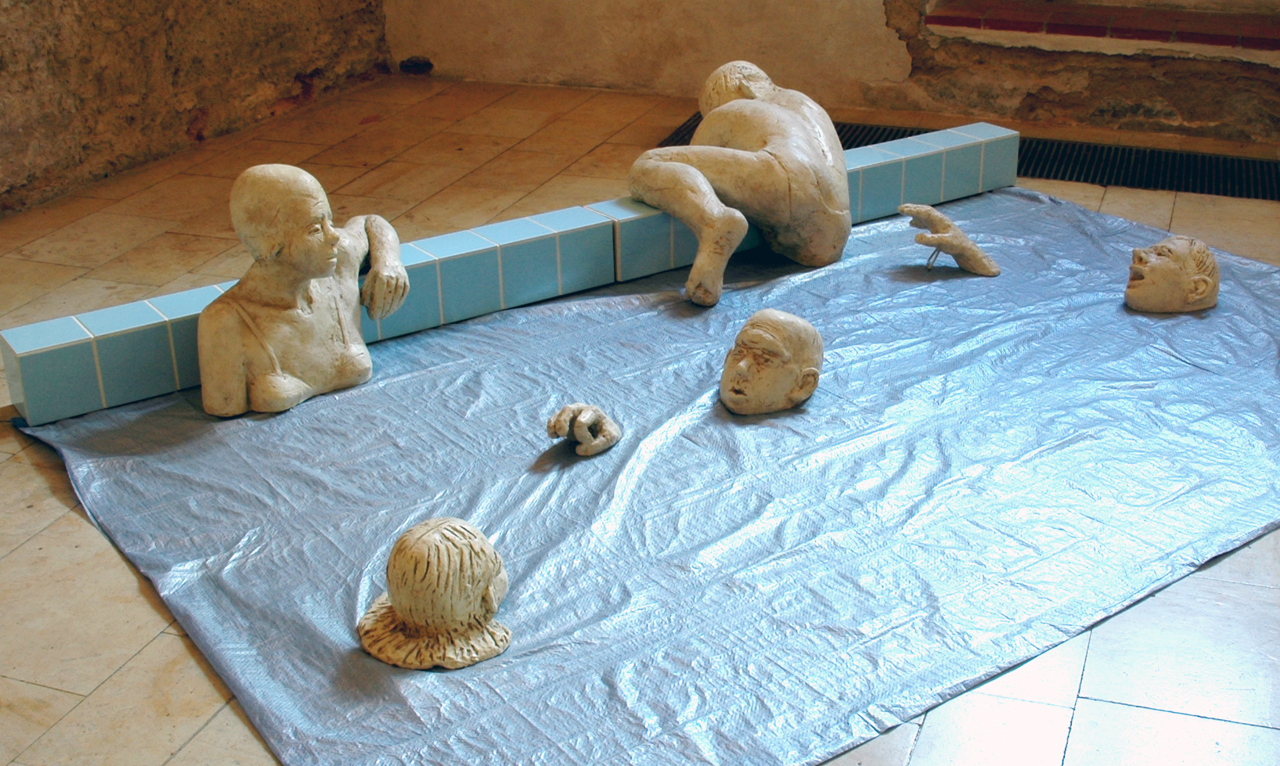
Swimming pool II (1988)

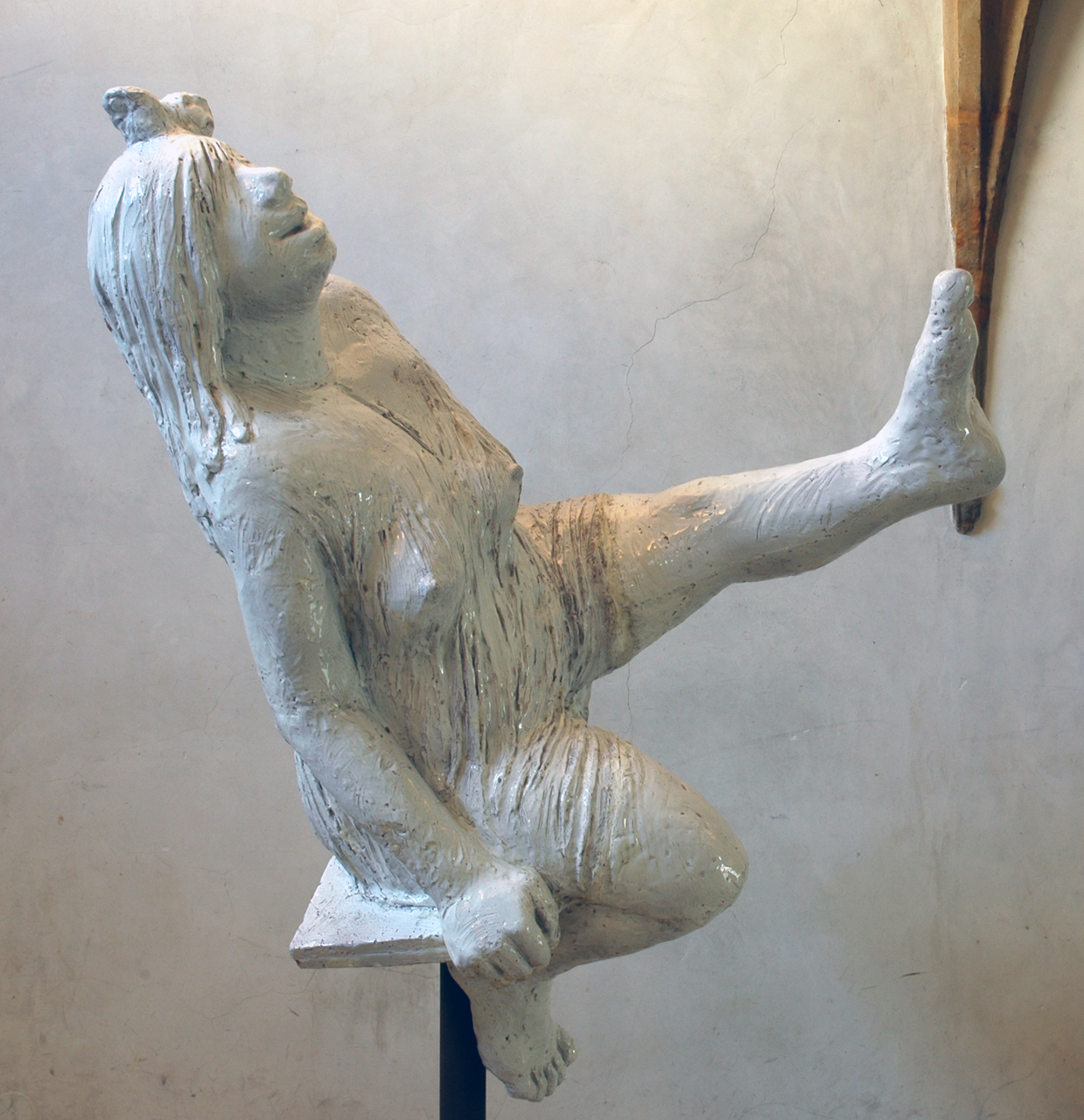
Julia, Swing I (1990-1991)

=== Sculptures in public spaces ===
Bohumil Zemánek is the author of several realisations in public space, e.g. the children's fountain in the Folimanka park in Prague, or the sculpture Dilemma (1988) in the atrium of the Primary School, Lehotského, Řepy housing estate, Prague 17.

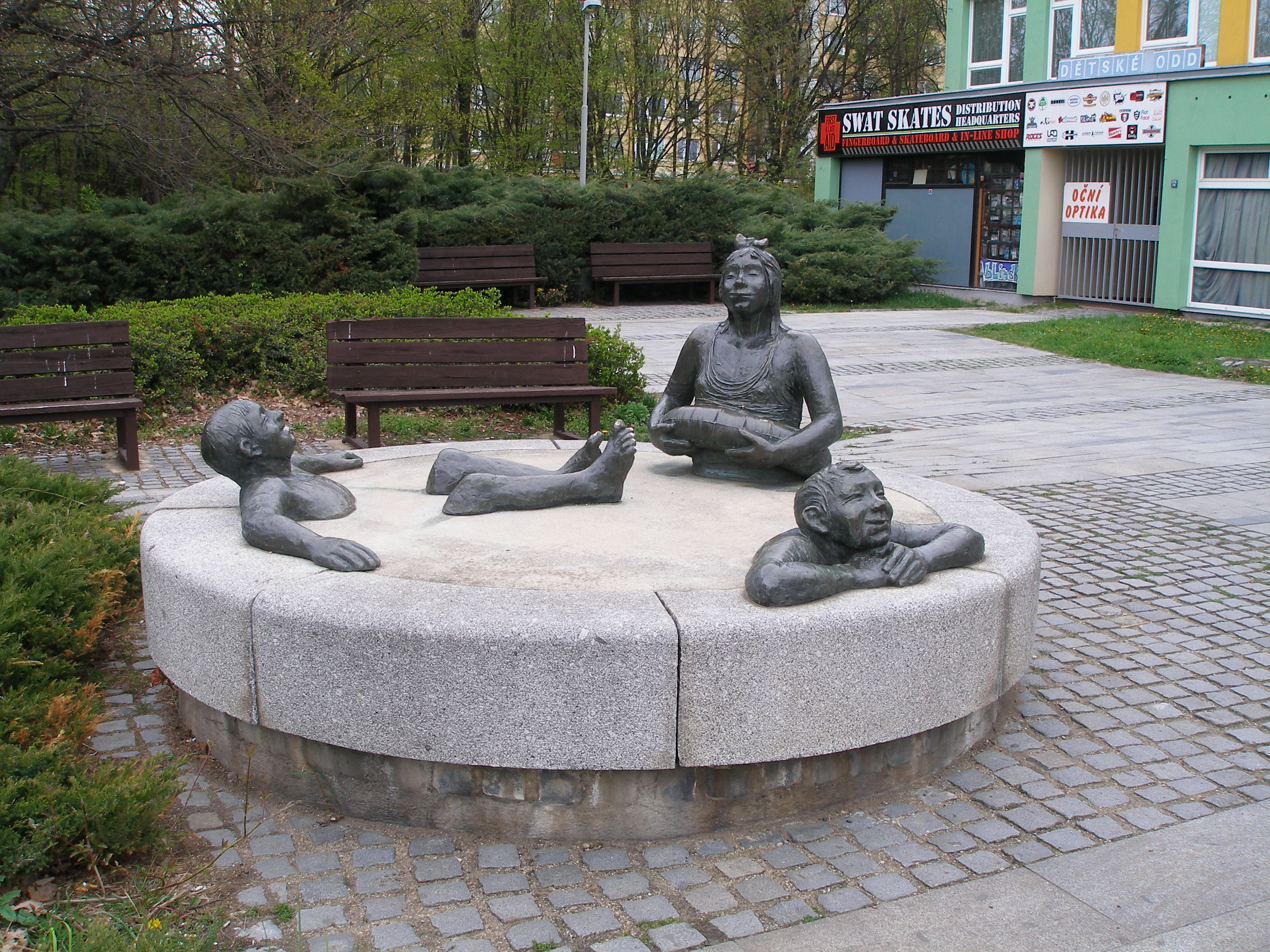
Swimming pool, Kobylisy

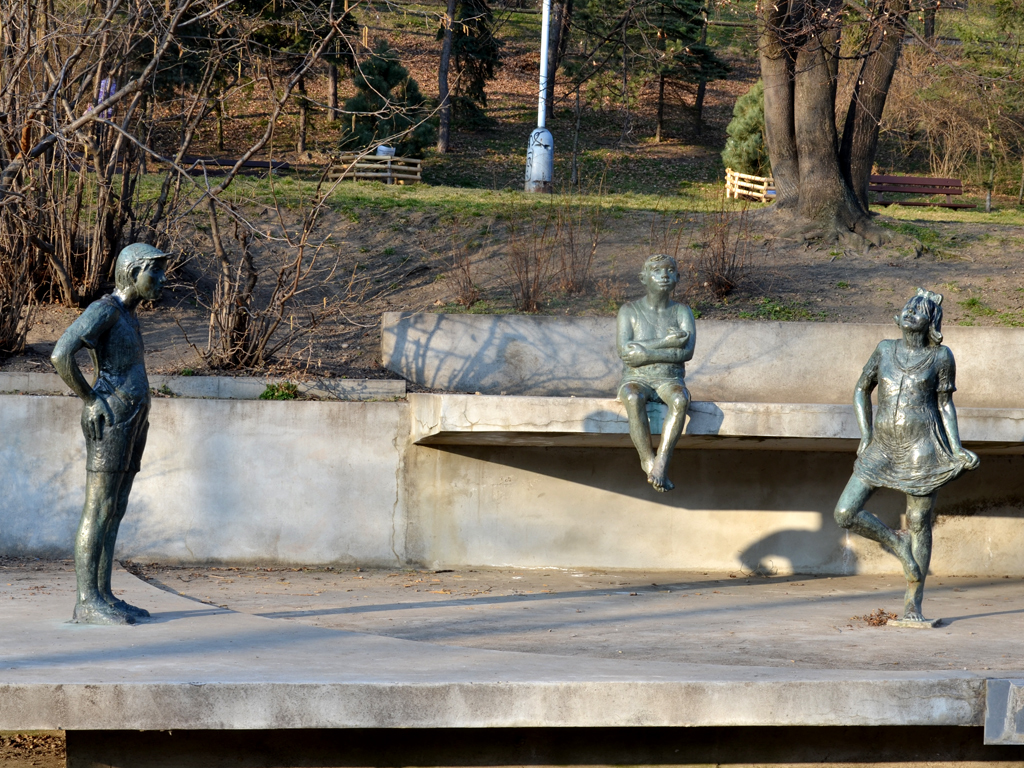
Sculpture Three in Folimanka Park

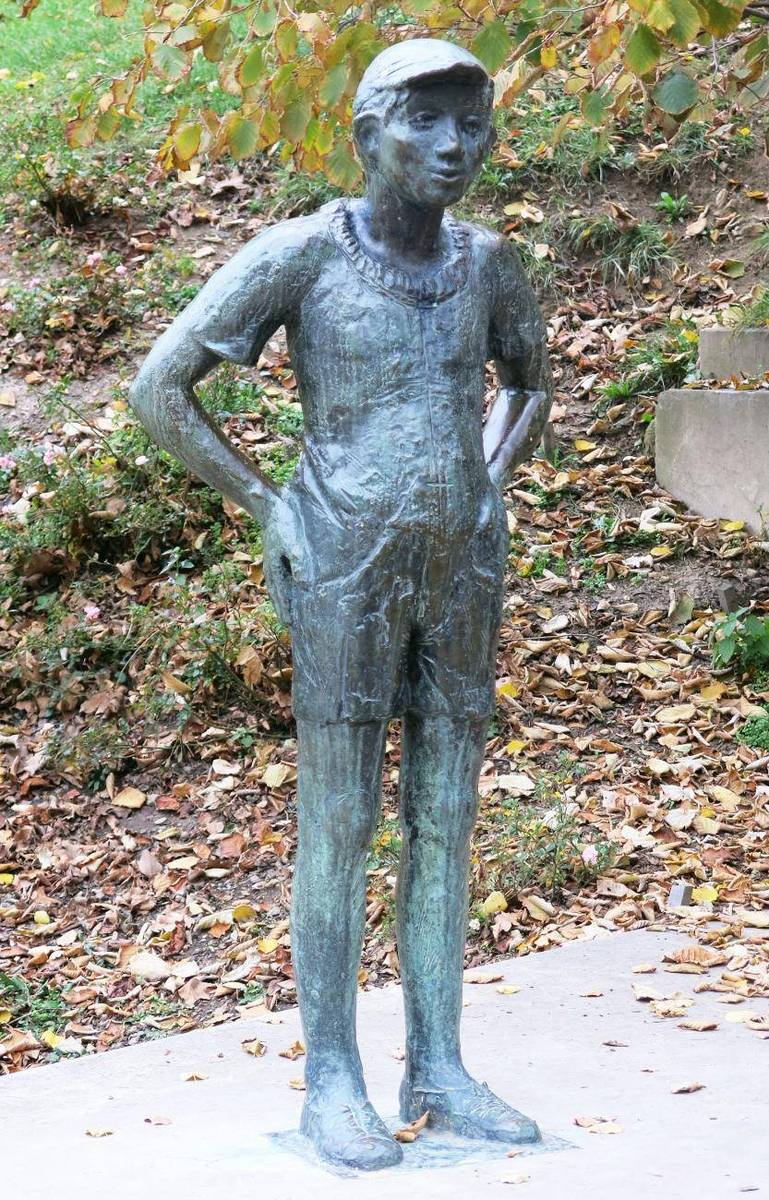
Sculpture Three in Folimanka Park

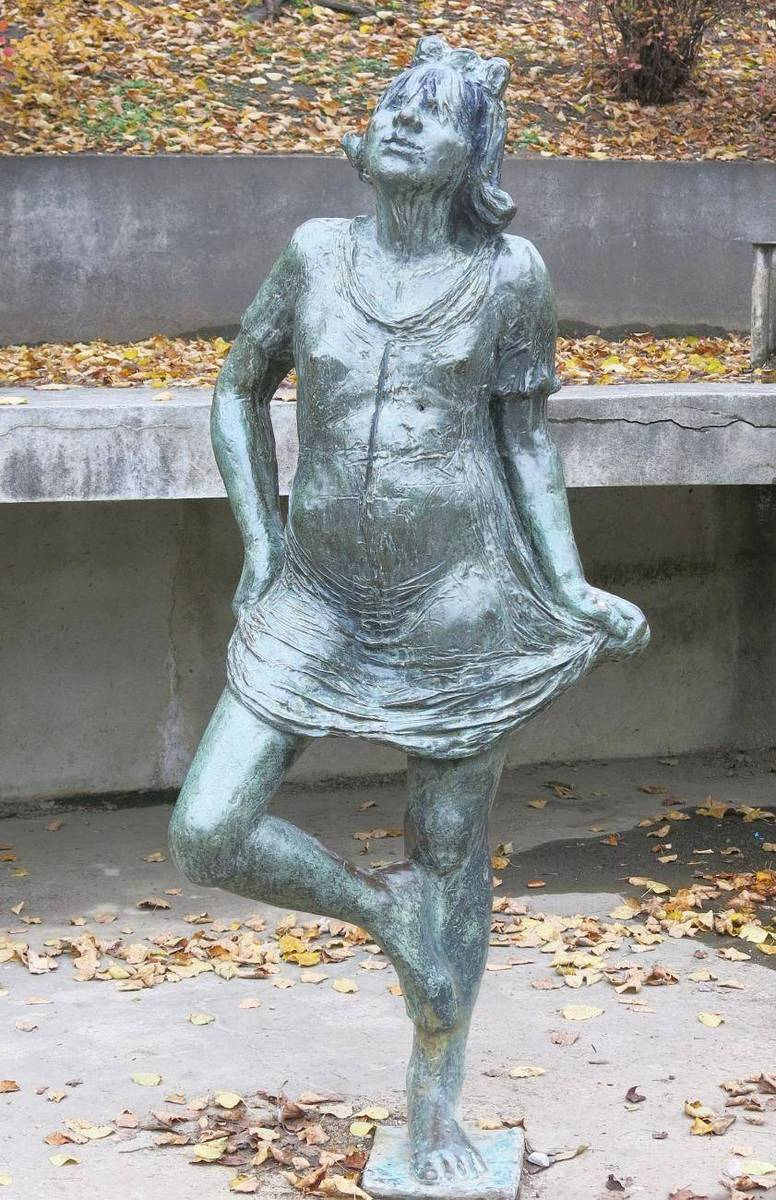
Sculpture Three in Folimanka Park

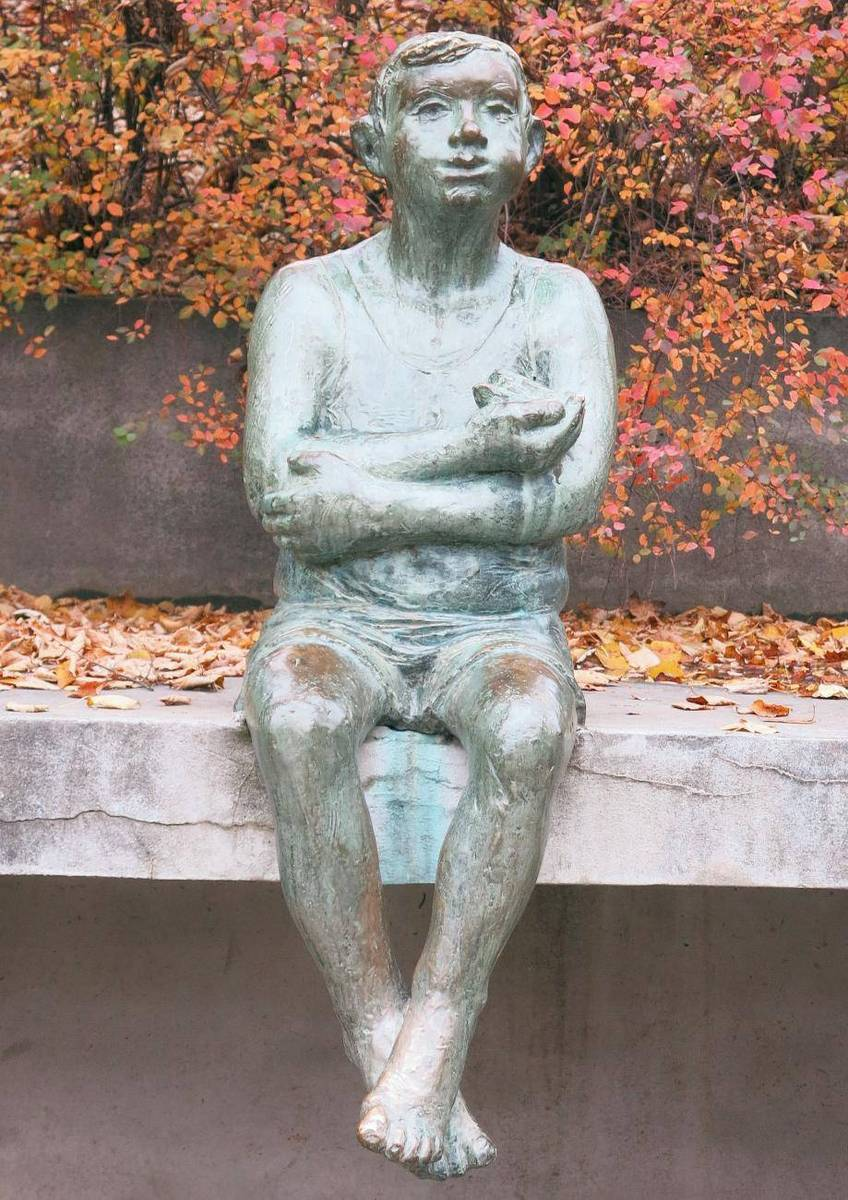
Sculpture Three in Folimanka Park

==== Collections ====
- National Gallery in Prague
- Prague Municipal Gallery
- Museum of Decorative Arts in Prague
- Moravian Gallery in Brno
- Gallery of Fine Arts Klenová / Klatovy
- North Bohemian Art Gallery of Litomerice
- Regional Gallery of Liberec
- Museum of Art, Olomouc
- Gallery of Fine Arts, Cheb
- Golden Goose Gallery, Prague
- private collections at home and abroad

=== Solo exhibitions ===
- 1971 Municipal Museum of Prague
- 1989 Bohumil Zemanek: Sculptures, Gallery of Fine Arts in Cheb
- 1993 Bohumil Zemanek and Mrs. Zemánková, Václav Špála Gallery, Prague
- 1994 Bohumil Zemanek and Mrs. Zemánková, Moravian Gallery in Brno
- 2009 Bohumil Zemanek rediscovered, Peron Gallery, Prague
- 2012 Bohumil Zemanek – Czech Grotesque, New Town Hall (Prague)

=== Group exhibitions ===
- Bohumil Zemánek participated in more than 40 group exhibitions in the Czech Republic and abroad.

=== Bibliography ===
==== Author's catalogues ====
- 1989 Bohumil Zemánek: Sochy, Vykoukal J, GVU Cheb ISBN 8085016036
- 1993 Bohumil Zemánek a paní Zemánková, Kříž J., Galerie Václava Špály, Praha

==== Anthology / reviews ====
- 1985, 78/1985, Jazzová sekce, Praha
- 1992, Sborník S.V.U. Mánes (Member exhibitions in the Mánes exhibition halls 11.5 – December 6, 1992 ), Mánes Union of Fine Arts

==== Books published ====
- 1978 Holub K, Mladí čeští sochaři (Young Czech sculptors), Odeon, Praha
- 1979 Růžička M, Vlček T, Současná keramika (Contemporary ceramics), Odeon, Praha
- 1994 Chalupecký J, Nové umění v Čechách (New Art in Bohemia), H & H Publishing, Ltd, Jinočany ISBN 80-85787-81-4
- 2000 Stádníková J et al., Sochy v Praze 1980–2000 (Statues in Prague 1980–2000), Publ. Who's Who, Praha ISBN 80-902586-5-4
