= Bohumil Mazánek =

Czech diplomat

Czech Republic Ambassador to Kosovo
- Incumbent
- Assumed office 25 July 2023
- President: Petr Pavel
- Preceded by: Pavel Bílek (Chargé d'affaires)

Czech Republic Ambassador to Lithuania
- In office 2014–2018
- President: Miloš Zeman
- Preceded by: Radek Pech
- Succeeded by: Vít Korselt

Personal details
- Born: 24 February 1962 (age 64) Kroměříž, Czechoslovakia
- Education: Moscow State Institute of International Relations

Bohumil Mazánek (born 24 February 1962) is a Czech diplomat and the current Czech Ambassador to Kosovo. Previously from 2014 to 2018 Mazánek served as Czech Ambassador to Lithuania.

== Early life ==
Bohumil Mazánek was born in Kroměříž, then Czechoslovakia, in 1962. From 1980 to 1986 he studied foreign relations at Moscow State Institute of International Relations in the Soviet Union.

== Career ==
In 1986 he started working at Czechoslovak Ministry of Foreign Affairs. From 1988 to 1991 he worked as ataché and chargé dʼaffaires at the Czechoslovak Embassy to Laos in Vientiane. From 1991 to 1992 he worked at the Czechoslovak Embassy to India in New Delhi. From 1993 to 1996 he was acting chargé dʼaffaires at Czech Embassy to Thailand. In 2000 Mazánek graduated at Prague Diplomatic Academy of the Ministry of Foreign Affairs. From 2007 to 2008 he was head of Czech General Consulate in Katowice. From 2008 to 2012 he was Czech General Consul in Shanghai.

From 2014 to 2018 se served Czech Ambassador to Lithuania. In July 2023 Czech President Petr Pavel appointed him on the position of first Czech Ambassador to Kosovo in Pristina.
