= Erich Bohuslav =

Austrian water polo player (1927–1961)

Personal information
- Nationality: Austrian
- Born: 28 April 1927
- Died: December 1961

Sport
- Sport: Water polo

Erich Bohuslav (28 April 1927 – December 1961) was an Austrian water polo player. He competed in the men's tournament at the 1952 Summer Olympics.
