= Bogumił Grott =

Polish historian

Bogumił Andrzej Grott (IPA: [bɔˈɡumiw ˈand.ʐɛj ˈɡɾɔt̪]) (born 3 January 1940 in Warsaw) is a Polish historian, lecturer and professor at the Institute of Religious Studies of Jagiellonian University in Kraków. He specializes in the history of Polish political thought, especially nationalism and its connection with Catholicism, right-wing National Democracy political camp, and Polish-Ukrainian relations.

He received his doctoral degree in 1975, habilitation in 1985 and a professor degree in 1997. Grott published about 135 publications, with 80 scientific articles in Polish, German and Ukrainian.

Grott has also written essays and articles published in Polish nationalist and radical Catholic press such as the Nasz Dziennik.

In 2008 he also signed a letter accusing the University of Wrocław of practicing "Stalinism" when the university, and more liberal media such as Gazeta Wyborcza, criticized some figures, such as Jerzy Robert Nowak, at an academic conference concerning Polish-German and Polish-Russian relations. Grott and other academic figures accused the university of censorship.

== Works ==
- Nacjonalizm i religia (Nationalism and Religion) (1984)
- Katolicyzm w doktrynach ugrupowań narodowo-radykalnych do roku 1939 (Catholicism in Doctrines of National-Radical Groups until 1939) (1987)
- Nacjonalizm chrześcijański (Christian Nationalism) (1991, 1996, 1999)
- Religia, Kościół, etyka w ideach i koncepcjach prawicy polskiej (Religion, Church, Ethics in the Ideas and Conceptions of the Polish Right) (1993)
- Zygmunt Balicki ideolog Narodowej Demokracji (Zygmunt Balicki ideologue of National Democracy) (1995)
- Adam Doboszyński o ustroju Polski (1996)
- Religia, cywilizacja, rozwój - wokół idei Jana Stachniuka (2003)
