= Bogomil Ferfila =

- Born: June 7, 1951 (age 75)
- Education: University of Ljubljana
- Occupations: University professor, lecturer, journalist

Bogomil Ferfila (born June 7, 1951) is a Slovenian political scientist, economist, and journalist.

Ferfila is founder and head of the American, German and Global Studies graduate program, chair of the "Policy Analysis and Public Administration" and a member of the Centre for Political Science Research at the Faculty of Social Sciences of University of Ljubljana.

He was a Fulbright Scholar (University of Pittsburgh; 1990–91) and Japan Foundation fellow (1998). Beside being a full professor at the University of Ljubljana, he was also visiting professor/scholar at the Cleveland State University (1991), University of Manitoba (1991, 1993, 1998–2014) and also at Washington State University (1998–2014).

== Selected bibliography ==
- Bogomil Ferfila and Paul Arthur Phillips: Political economy of labor: Canada and Slovenia (Calcutta: Sampark; 2011; ISBN 978-81-7768-053-9)
- Bogomil Ferfila and Paul Arthur Phillips: Slovenia's transition: From medieval roots to the European Union (Lanham: Lexington Books; 2010; ISBN 978-0-7391-3630-0.)
