= Bogomil Avramov =

Bulgarian writer and poet

Bogomil K. Avramov-Hemy (born August 17, 1937 in Varna) is a Bulgarian writer and poet. He writes both fiction and science essays on the modern problems of ecology. He is married, and has two sons. His books include Cricket in Beak, Marifeya or Talking with Dolphins, The Common Heritage of the Planet or About Of Fish and People and The Startled Cheepens.

== Education ==
Avramov was educated in Deutcheshulle, from 1943 to 1944. He had his primary school education at Saint Angelary, Varna City in 1952. In 1958, Avramov attended The Machine Engineering College in Varna City. He also attended The Varna Technical University in 1968 for a Tertiary Education Certificate.

== Career ==
- The Varna Diesel Plant – Head of the Automatization Department;
- The Varna Shipbuilding Institute – Science Research Fellow;
- The Varna Marine Channel Department – Head of the Technical Department;
- Committee for Nature Protection at the Council of Ministry - Governmental Marine-Ecology Expert № 295 based Varna;
- Freelance Selfemployed Private Researcher;
- Invited Lecturer at the High Economy Schools

in Sofia and Varna,

- Invited Professor on Ecology and Informatiq at The International Academy MAUP-Kiev, Branch Bulgaria, etc. ...

== Memberships ==
- 1993 – The Writer’s Association, Varna City;
- 1992 – Founder of the Association “Ecogoodwill for Kavarna”;
- 1988 – Academician at Accademia Internationale IBLEA di Lettere Science e Arte, Italia;
- 1984 – International Association for Impact Assessment, USA;
- 1984 – The Bulgarian Union of Scientist, Branch Varna.

== Publications ==
- 1958-2007 – more than 600 different type articles in the central and local newspapers and specialized periodicals.
- 1958-2002 – more than 77 in the specialized press or as limited closed distribution.
