= TEV Miesbach =

- City: Miesbach, Germany
- League: Oberliga
- Founded: 1928
- Home arena: Eissporthalle Miesbach
- Colours: Red, White

TEV Miesbach is an ice hockey team in Miesbach, Germany. They play in the Oberliga, the third level of ice hockey in Germany. The club was founded in 1928.
