= Gottlieb (name) =

Gottlieb (German for 'beloved by God') is a theophoric name that is used as a surname or as a male given name. Gottlieb appeared in High German in the 17th century, in German speaking parts of Europe. It was a product of the age of pietism, giving young men a religiously charged name. Earlier forms of the name are attested from the 6th century in the Gothic language as Gudilub, normalized as 'Gudaliufs'.

Equivalent names in other languages include Latin Amadeus, Greek Theophil, and Bulgarian Bogomil.

== Surname ==
- Adolph Gottlieb (1903–1974), American sculptor and painter
- Alan Gottlieb, American author and conservative activist
- Anna Gottlieb, Austrian soprano
- Anthony Gottlieb, British writer
- Bernice Gottlieb (born 1931), early leader in the trans-racial adoption movement
- Binyamin Gottlieb, American criminal
- Carl Gottlieb, American screenwriter
- Chaim Yosef Gottlieb of Stropkov, Hungarian rabbi
- Craig Gottlieb, American militaria and antique dealer
- Danny Gottlieb, American drummer
- David Gottlieb (disambiguation), several people
- Doug Gottlieb, American basketball player
- Dovid Gottlieb, Israeli mathematician
- Edward Gottlieb, Ukrainian basketball coach
- Eli Gottlieb, Israeli philosopher
- Ferdinand Gottlieb (1919–2007), American architect
- Franz Josef Gottlieb (1930–2006), Austrian film director and screenwriter
- Gilbert Gottlieb (1929–2006), American psychologist
- Harry Gottlieb (1895–1992), American painter, screen printer, lithographer, and educator
- Harry Nathan Gottlieb, founder of Jellyvision and Jackbox Games
- Jane Gottlieb (born 1937; birth name of Jane Sauer), American fiber artist, sculptor
- Jette Gottlieb (born 1948), Danish politician
- Joseph Abraham Gottlieb (1918–2007), birth name of Joey Bishop, American entertainer
- Kade Gottlieb, also known as Gottmik, American drag performer and makeup artist
- Katherine Gottlieb, American businessperson
- Larry Gottlieb (born 1951), American songwriter
- Lauren Gottlieb. American dancer
- Laurie N. Gottlieb, professor
- Lea Gottlieb, Hungarian-born Israeli fashion designer
- Leo Gottlieb (1920–1972), New York Knicks basketball player
- Leo Gottlieb (lawyer) (c. 1896–1989), one of the founding partners of the firm Cleary Gottlieb Steen & Hamilton
- Leopold Gottlieb, Polish painter, brother of Maurycy
- Leslie D. Gottlieb (1936–2012), American biologist
- Lindsay Gottlieb (born 1977), American basketball coach
- Lori Gottlieb, American journalist
- Louis Gottlieb, American entertainer, bassist of the Limelighters
- Lynn Gottlieb (born 1949), American rabbi
- Marcel Gottlieb, French comic creator known professionally as Gotlib
- Mark Gottlieb (disambiguation)
- Maurycy Gottlieb, Polish painter, brother of Leopold
- Max Gottlieb (born 1969), American production designer, screenwriter, and film director
- Michael S. Gottlieb, American AIDS researcher
- Michael T. Gottlieb, American bridge player
- Mike Gottlieb, American college baseball coach
- Nina Katzir née Gottlieb (1914–1986), wife of the President of the State of Israel Ephraim Katzir
- Otto Gottlieb (1920–2011), Czechoslovak-born naturalized Brazilian chemist and scientist
- Paul David Gottlieb (1943–2003), American molecular biologist
- Robert Gottlieb, American writer
- Scott Gottlieb, American physician and 23rd commissioner of the US Food and Drug Administration
- Sidney Gottlieb (1918–1999), American chemist and spymaster
- Sigal Gottlieb, American applied mathematician
- Tom Gottlieb, one of the employees of Jackbox Games
- William P. Gottlieb, American photographer
- The two founders of the Adolph and Esther Gottlieb Foundation

== Given name (first name and middle name) ==
- Gottlieb Amstein, Swiss cyclist
- Gottlieb Ast, Estonian politician
- Gottlieb Ayedze (born 2000), American football player
- Gottlieb Bach (1900–1973), Danish distance runner
- Gottlieb Berger, American politician
- Gottlieb Bodmer, German artist
- Gottlieb Nathaniel Bonwetsch, German theologian
- Gottlieb Burckhardt, Swiss psychiatrist
- Gottlieb Burian, founder of Burien, Washington, United States
- Gottlieb Bender Christiansen, American priest
- Gottlieb Daimler, German industrialist
- Gottlieb Adelbert Delbrück, German banker
- Gottlieb Duttweiler, Swiss businessman
- Gottlieb Elster, German sculptor
- Gottlieb Fröhlich, Swiss rower
- Gottlieb Garber, American politician
- Gottlieb Gluge, German physician who practised in Belgium
- Gottlieb Göller, German footballer and manager
- Gottlieb Göttlich, German intersex man
- Gottlieb Graupner, American composer
- Gottlieb Sigmund Gruner, cartographer and geologist
- Gottlieb Haberlandt, Austrian botanist
- Gottlieb Graf von Haeseler, German general
- Gottlieb Christoph Harless, German classicist
- Gottlieb Christoph Adolf von Harless, German theologian
- Gottlieb Heileman, American brewer
- Gottlieb Hering, German SS-Hauptsturmführer (captain), concentration camp commandant
- Gottlieb August Wilhelm Herrich-Schäffer, German entomologist and physician
- Gottlieb Hufeland, German economist
- Gottlieb Jäger, Swiss politician and judge
- Gottlieb von Jagow, German diplomat
- Gottlieb Kirchhoff, Russian chemist
- Gottlieb Jakob Kuhn, Swiss poet
- Gottlieb Wilhelm Leitner, British orientalist
- Gottlieb Machate, German chess player
- Gottlieb Madl, German film editor
- Gottlieb Matthias Carl Masch, German historian
- Gottlieb Mittelberger, German writer and educator
- Gottlieb Mohnike, German translator, theologian, and philologist
- Gottlieb Muffat, American composer and organist
- Gottlieb Nakuta, Namibian footballer
- Gottlieb Ott, Swiss businessman
- Gottlieb Konrad Pfeffel, German writer
- Gottlieb Jakob Planck, German historian
- Gottlieb Polak, Austrian equestrian
- Gottlieb Rabener, German writer
- Gottlieb Reber, Swiss art dealer and collector
- Gottlieb Redecker, German architect
- Gottlieb Renz, a winner of the Knight's Cross of the Iron Cross
- Gottlieb Ringier, Swiss politician
- Gottlieb Eliel Saarinen, Finnish-American architect
- Gottlieb Schick, German artist
- Gottlieb Schuler, Australian journalist
- Gottlieb Schumacher, American archaeologist and architect
- Gottlieb Stephanie, Austrian opera librettist
- Gottlieb Conrad Christian Storr, German naturalist
- Gottlieb Storz, American businessman
- Gottlieb Samuel Studer, Swiss mountain climber
- Gottlob Heinrich Curt von Tottleben, German-born Russian general
- Gottlieb Viehe, German missionary
- Gottlieb Charles Wachter, German businessman
- Gottlieb Wanzenried, cyclist
- Gottlieb Weber, cyclist
- Gottlieb Wehrle, American politician
- Gottlieb Welté, German painter
- Gottlieb Ziegler, Swiss politician
- Alexander Gottlieb Baumgarten, German philosopher
- Fabian Gottlieb von Bellingshausen, Russian admiral and explorer
- Michael Gottlieb Bindesbøll, Danish architect
- Johann Gottlieb Fichte, German philosopher
- Friedrich Gottlieb Klopstock, German poet
- Wolfgang Gottlieb Mozart, a variant of Mozart's name used by his father
- Christian Gottlieb Priber, American pioneer
- Friedrich Gottlieb Welcker, German philologist and archaeologist

== See also ==
- Gotlieb, surname
- Gottlob
