= Theophilus =

- Pronunciation: /θiˈɒfɪləs/

Origin
- Meaning: Love of God; Friend of God
- Region of origin: Greek

Other names
- Variant forms: Théophile, Teófilo, Feofil

Theophilus is a male given name with a range of alternative spellings. Its origin is the Greek word Θεόφιλος from θεός (theós, "God") and φιλία (philía, "love or affection") can be translated as "Love of God" or "Friend of God", i.e., it is a theophoric name, synonymous with the name Amadeus which originates from Latin, Gottlieb in German and Bogomil or Bogumił in Slavic. Theophilus may refer to:

== People ==
=== Ancient rulers ===
- Theophilos (emperor) (c. 812–842), Byzantine Emperor (reigned 829–842), the second of the Phrygian dynasty
- Theophilus (Indo-Greek) (fl. 130 or 90 BC), Indo-Greek king

=== Ancient and medieval authors ===
- Theophilus (geographer), ancient Greek geographer
- Theophilus (jurist) (fl. 533), one author of the Institutes of Justinian
- Theophilus of Edessa (695–785), medieval astrologer and scholar
- Theophilos Erotikos (10th century), Byzantine jurist and geometer
- Theophilus Presbyter (1070–1125), Benedictine monk, author, metallurgist, artist and armourer — thought to be a pseudonym of Roger of Helmarshausen
- Theophilus Protospatharius, (c. 7th century), Byzantine medical writer

=== Artists ===
- Theophilus Cibber (1703–1758), English actor, playwright, author, son of the actor-manager Colley Cibber
- Theophilus Clarke (1776?–1831), English painter
- Theophilos Hatzimihail (c. 1870–1934), Greek folk painter from Lesbos
  - Theofilos (film), a 1987 Greek film

=== Military ===
- Theophilos Erotikos (fl. 1034–1042), Byzantine general and governor, rebel in Cyprus
- Theophilus H. Holmes (1804–1880), Confederate general in the American Civil War
- Theophilos Kourkouas (920–970), Byzantine general, grandfather of emperor John I Tzimiskes
- Theophilus Weeks (1708–1772), soldier in the French and Indian War

=== Musicians ===
- Theophilus London (born 1987), Trinidadian-American vocalist
- Theophilus Martins (born 1987), American rapper, DJ, and model

=== Politics ===
- Theophilus Bradbury (1739–1803), U.S. Representative from Massachusetts
- Theophilus Eugene Connor (1897–1973), Birmingham, Alabama's Commissioner of Public Safety during the American Civil Rights Movement
- Theophilus Daniel (1817–1893), New Zealand politician
- Theophilus Danjuma (born 1938), influential Nigerian soldier and politician
- Theophilus Eaton (1590–1658), merchant, farmer, Puritan colonial leader, co-founder and first governor of New Haven Colony, Connecticut
- Theophilus Howard, 2nd Earl of Suffolk (1584–1640), English nobleman and politician
- Theophilus F. Metcalf (1816–1891), American farmer and politician
- Theophilus Shepstone (1817–1893), British South African statesman
- Theophilus Williams (1824–1904), mayor of Ballarat

=== Religious leaders ===
- Theophilus (biblical), person to whom the Gospel of Luke and the Acts of the Apostles were addressed
- Theophilus ben Ananus, High Priest of Israel.
- Theophilus of Antioch (died c. 183), Christian apologist and Patriarch of Antioch
- Theophilus, bishop of Caesarea (fl. 195)
- Theophilus the Deacon, martyr from Libya
- Theophilus (bishop of the Goths), first known Gothic bishop, participant of the First Council of Nicaea in 325
- Theophilos the Indian (fl. 354–364), Arian bishop, also called "the Ethiopian", probably from the Maldive Islands
- Patriarch Theophilus (disambiguation)
  - Theophilus I of Alexandria (died c. 412), 23rd Pope of Alexandria
- Theophilus of Adana (fl. 538), bishop who made a pact with the devil
- Theophilus Gale (1628–1678), English nonconformist divine
- Theophilus Gates (1787–1846), American religious leader
- Theophilus Herter (1913–1987), American Anglican bishop
- Theophilus Lindsey (1723–1808), English theologian
- Theophilus, a pagan lawyer converted by Saint Dorothea of Caesarea at the scene of her execution, martyr

=== Other ===
- Theophilus Carter (1824–1904), British inventor and furniture dealer
- Theophilus Cazenove (1740–1811), Dutch financier and one of the agents of the Holland Land Company
- Theophilus Metcalfe (bap. 1610–c. 1645), English stenographer who invented a popular shorthand system
- Theophilus Redwood (1806–1892), Welsh pharmacist

== Theophila ==
Theophila is a female version of the name.

- Theophila Gwatkin (1757–1848), British painter
- Theophila Townsend (1656–1692), Quaker writer and activist

== Fictional characters ==
- Theophilus, one of Leibniz's interlocutors in his book New Essays on Human Understanding
- Professor Theophilus Branestawm, the protagonist of the Professor Branestawm series of children's books
- Theophilus Goon, a policeman in Enid Blyton's Five Find-Outers series of children's mystery novels
- Dr. Theophilus Grantly, in Anthony Trollope's novel Barchester Towers
- Theophilus Msimangu, in Alan Paton's Cry, the Beloved Country
- Theophilus North, title character in Thornton Wilder's last novel (1973)
- Dr. Theophilus Tanner, from the Deathlands series of books
- Theophilus Thistle, in a noted tongue-twister
- Theophilus P. Wildebeeste, created by Lenny Henry
- Theophilus (comic strip), the title character of a religious comic strip (1966–2002)

== See also ==
- Theofelus, surname and given name
- Theophil, a given name
- Teófilo, a given name
- Theophilia, the love or favour of God
- Jedediah, a given name also meaning "Friend of God"
- Godwin (disambiguation), the equivalent Anglo-Saxon name
- Guðni, the Icelandic form of the name
