= Heinrich von Arx =

Swiss draftsman and painter (1802–1858)

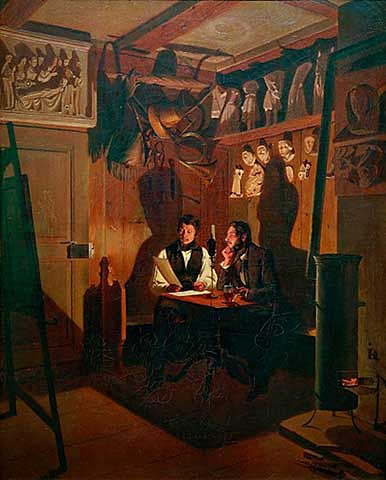
- Self-portrait with the painter friend Heinrich von Arx by Rudolf Durheim, around 1839
- Born: 12 September 1802; Probably Bern, Helvetic Republic
- Died: 30 January 1858 (aged 55); Bern, Switzerland
- Occupations: Draftsman; painter
- Father: Heinrich von Arx
- Relatives: Philipp Adrian von Arx (cousin)

Heinrich von Arx (12 September 1802 – 30 January 1858) was a Swiss draftsman and painter. His considerable talent for caricature is shown by his illustrations for Jeremias Gotthelf's Neuer Berner Kalender and his work in the Gukkasten, which he published and edited. He was a friend of Martin Disteli and the first teacher of Frank Buchser.

== Biography ==
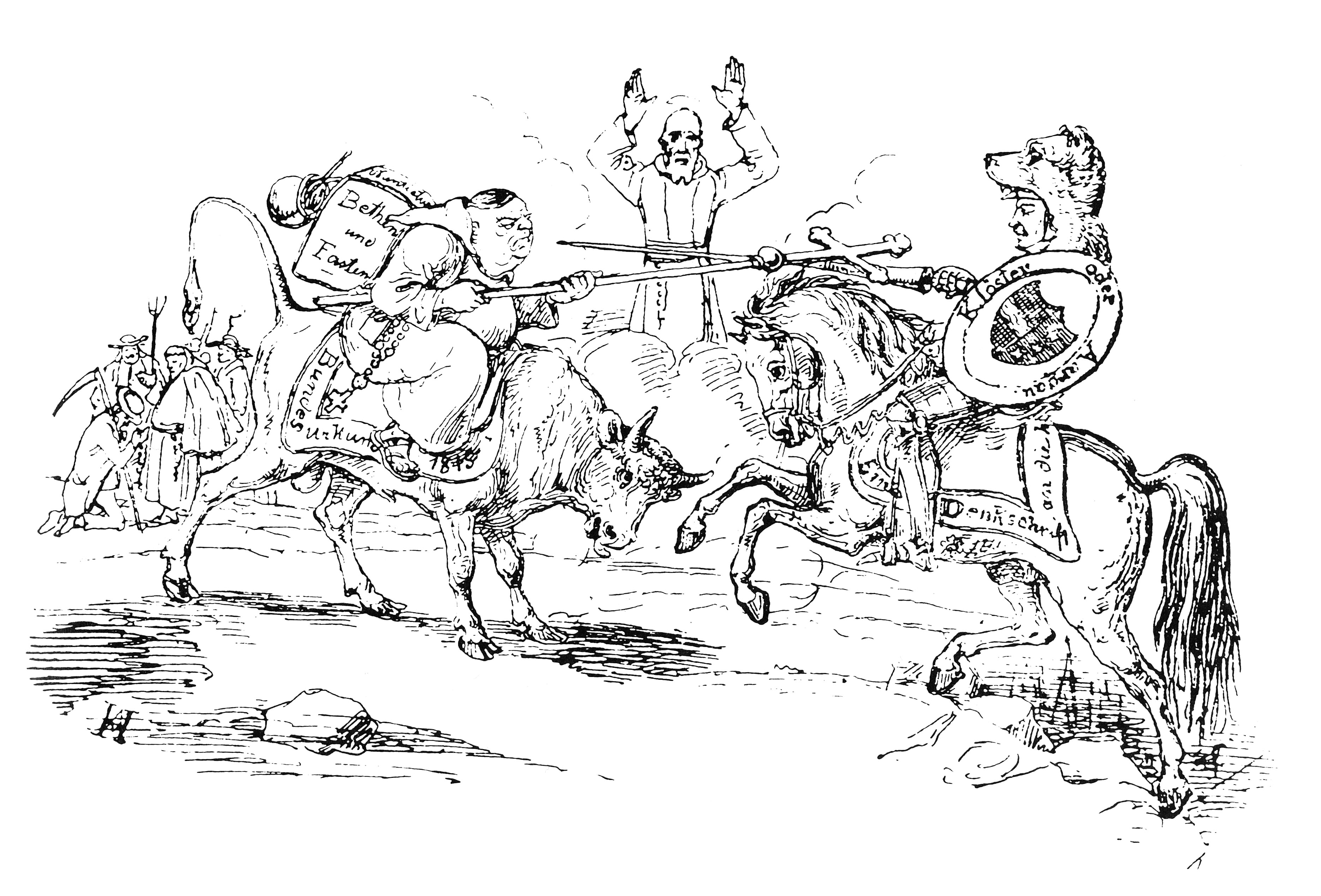
Cartoon by von Arx on the Aargau Monastery Dispute in the Gukkasten of 25 March 1841

Heinrich von Arx was born on 12 September 1802, probably in Bern, the son of Heinrich von Arx, a shoemaker. He remained unmarried.

Von Arx began studying medicine but then became a draftsman and oil painter. His considerable talent in the field of caricature and humorous sketches (Humoreske) is shown by his illustrations for Jeremias Gotthelf's Neuer Berner Kalender (1838–1842) and for the Phantasien im Kornhauskeller (1848) by his cousin Philipp Adrian von Arx, and by his illustrations in the Postheiri (1849) and in the Gukkasten (1840–1850), which he published and edited.

He was a friend of Martin Disteli and the first teacher of Frank Buchser. After he lost his sight he could no longer work as an artist, and he died impoverished in Bern on 30 January 1858.

== Bibliography ==
- Schweizerisches Künstler-Lexikon, 1, 53–54
- O. E. von Arx, Geschichte der Familie von Arx, 1941, 100, 252–253 (with a list of works)
- Allgemeines Künstlerlexikon, 5, 357
