= Theophil =

Theophil (Greek: God-inherited or God's Love, see also Gottlieb) may refer to:

- Baron Theophil von Hansen (1813–1891), Danish architect who later became an Austrian citizen
- Theophil Friedrich Christen (1879–1920), doctor, mathematician, physicist, economist and pioneer of physical medicine and X-ray radiation
- Theophil Henry Hildebrandt (1888–1980), American mathematician
- Theophil Mitchell Prudden (1849–1924), American pathologist
- Theophil Ruderstaller (1906–1946), capuchin and China missionary
- Theophil Wurm (1868–1953), a leader in the German Protestant Church

== See also ==
- Theophilus
