= Neuer Berner Kalender =

Swiss almanac published from 1838 to 1852

- Editor: Bernese Society of Public Utility (1838-1842)
- Categories: Almanac
- Frequency: Annual
- Circulation: Up to 11,000 copies
- Publisher: Karl Rätzer (1838-1841), Christian Albrecht Jenni (1842-1852)
- Founder: Bernese Society of Public Utility
- First issue: 1838
- Final issue: 1852
- Country: Switzerland
- Based in: Bern
- Language: German, Bernese German

The Neuer Berner Kalender (New Bernese Calendar) was a popular almanac published in Switzerland from 1838 to 1852. Founded and edited by the Bernese Society of Public Utility until 1842, it became particularly renowned for the collaboration of Albert Bitzius (better known by his pen name Jeremias Gotthelf) who served as editor from 1840 to 1845.

== Founding and editors ==
The reform of almanacs was considered a decisive factor in promoting popular education during the 1820s. The Censorship Commission and later the Bernese Society of Public Utility sought to improve the highly popular Hinkender Bote (Limping Messenger). When negotiations with publisher Carl Samuel Stämpfli and editor Gottlieb Jakob Kuhn failed to reach an agreement, the Society launched its own almanac, the Neuer Berner Kalender.

The almanac was initially printed in Bern by Karl Rätzer from 1838 to 1841, and subsequently by Christian Albrecht Jenni until 1852. From 1842 onwards, illustrations and caricatures were created by Heinrich von Arx. (Note: Sources disagree on the dates: the HDS article on the calendar gives 1842 onwards, while the HDS biography of Heinrich von Arx dates his illustrations for the calendar to 1838–1842.)

The Neuer Berner Kalender was part of the intense almanac production of the 1830s, facilitated by technical and social developments such as the invention of the mechanical press and the gradual expansion of freedom of the press. While the editor's name for the years 1838 and 1839 remains unknown, Albert Bitzius took responsibility for the volumes from 1840 to 1845. Although his contributions were not signed, readers knew he was the author, which ensured a certain success for the publication.

== Content ==
The almanac achieved sales of up to 11,000 copies, though this barely covered production costs. For peasants and small merchants, the information on dates and locations of annual and weekly markets, data on Swiss franc to French franc conversion rates, and interest rate tables were of great practical utility. Bitzius's successor is not known, and like many new almanacs of the period, the Neuer Berner Kalender disappeared in the early 1850s.

Through entertainment texts, Bitzius anchored the Neuer Berner Kalender in the tradition of popular almanacs. He developed content typical of this genre of publications, including annual overviews, literary curiosities, and fictional travel narratives, giving the periodical its own distinct character. While these sections were dominated by a satirical view of politics and world events, other stories were mainly devoted to everyday rural life, often written in a language mixing German and Bernese dialect.

Bitzius also composed a spiritual treatise for each year, which has led scholars to consider the Neuer Berner Kalender both as a Christian almanac and a political publication. The almanac thus served multiple functions, combining practical information with entertainment, religious reflection, and social commentary.

== Bibliography ==
- Hunziker, Rudolf: "Der Neue Berner Kalender vor und unter der Redaktion Jeremias Gotthelfs", in: Neues Berner Taschenbuch (auf das Jahr 1934), 39, 1933, pp. 99-155.
- Tschopp, Silvia Serena: "Jeremias Gotthelfs Neuer Berner-Kalender und seine schweizerischen Konkurrenten", in: Mahlmann-Bauer, Barbara; Zimmermann, Christian von (ed.): Jeremias Gotthelf – Wege zu einer neuen Ausgabe, 2006, pp. 169-186.
- Wernicke, Norbert D.: "… kurz, was sich in den Kalender schikt. Literarische Texte in Schweizer Volkskalendern von 1508 bis 1848. Eine Bestandsaufnahme", 2011.
- Wernicke, Norbert D.: Die Brattig. 300 Jahre Hinkende Bot von Bern, 2018.
