= Secularization (church property) =

State seizing of church property

Secularization is the confiscation of church property by a government, such as in the suppression of monasteries. The term is often used to specifically refer to such confiscations during the French Revolution and the First French Empire in the sense of seizing churches and converting their property to state ownership.

== Etymology ==
The Latin term saecularisatio was already used in 1559 and used as a verb in 1586.

“Saecularisatio” did not refer to the confiscation of property of churches at this time; “profanatio sacrae rei” was used instead to refer to this definition of secularization, referring to church property.

== Examples of Secularization in History ==
=== England: Dissolution of the Monasteries ===
The Dissolution of the Monasteries in England began in 1536 under Henry VIII of England. While some monasteries were simply abolished, and their property retained by the Crown or by the King's favorites, others remained in the Church of England as collegiate foundations, including cathedrals and royal peculiars, staffed by secular clergy.

=== Spain: Ecclesiastical confiscations of Mendizábal ===
The Ecclesiastical confiscations of Mendizábal refer to a February 1836 decree for the Desamortización declared by Juan Álvarez Mendizábal. He was prime minister at the time of the release of the decree.

The Spanish government confiscated the property because they felt that the property was underused by the monasteries. The government saw this land as a perfect opportunity to gain wealth and increase the holdings of the nobility. The churches were not compensated for their property and were taken. Many middlemen were involved in the acquisition of the properties because the church excommunicated the auctioneers and buyers. In order for the transaction to go through to obtain the property, they had to use a third-party individual.

The confiscations took place at the same time as the First Carlist War, of which there were three. The Carlist Wars were a series of civil wars in the 19th century involving Liberal-Republican factions who wanted a secular and modern government. In contrast, the traditional Carlist faction wanted to preserve ancient traditions and royalty.

=== Austria: Josephinism ===
Josephinism in Austria refers to the actions of Joseph II, Holy Roman Emperor, and the transformation of the Catholic Church as subservient to the monarchy. Enlightened absolutism was a concept that spread across Continental Europe, separating church and state and putting the authority of the state out of the hands of the church. Several monasteries were seized before the French Revolution.

The French Revolution brought about a period of extremity and conflict among traditional royalists, and enlightened liberals. Joseph II had a strong aversion for monasteries that he viewed as not contributing positively to society, although he was a Catholic. Upwards of 500 out of 1,188 monasteries in Austria were taken, and 60 million florins were taken by the state. 1700 new parishes and welfare institutions were created from this wealth and property.

=== German mediatization ===
German mediatization refers to the restructuring of German territory between 1802 and 1814 of the former Holy Roman Emperor into 39 German states, from the original 300 states and principalities. Many properties and buildings owned by the Church were confiscated and reallocated through this process. Monasteries, land, property titles, and authority were stripped from the princes and religious leaders of these German states.

The pressure of German Mediatization was not initiated by the Germans themselves, but rather by the diplomatic pressure by Napoleon and the French military.

The legislation that brought about the German mediatization is known as The Final Recess of the Imperial Deputation (German: Reichsdeputationshauptschluss) of 25 February 1803.

This law brought about the property restructuring of the Holy Roman Empire. By reallocating the ecclesiastical states and the imperial cities to other imperial estates, they were able to satisfy Napoleon's demands and bring about increased secularisation.

=== Romania: secularization of monastic estates ===
The Secularization of Monastic Estates in Romania refers to the confiscation of large estates owned and operated by the Eastern Orthodox Church in Romania. The land confiscated was utilized for land reform and agriculture. By confiscating monastery lands, the boyars of Romania were able to keep their estates intact while still developing the infrastructure of Romania.

The law that enacted the secularization of monastic estates in Romania was approved by the Parliament of Romania and brought about in December 1863 by Domnitor Alexandru Ioan Cuza.

Romania was then known as the Romanian United Principalities.

The monasteries were untaxed and as they composed ¼ of Romania's land, the inability to tax these lands and the Church's ownership had negative effects on the state's ability to generate revenue.

=== Switzerland ===
In Switzerland, secularization affected only the Catholic Church, particularly the dioceses and monasteries, and took place in two main phases. The first, in the 16th century, accompanied the Reformation: cantons and allied territories that adopted the new faith took over the property of monasteries, chapters, and churches throughout their territories, often after voluntary cessions by religious superiors sympathetic to the Reformation. Liturgical objects were melted down as coinage metal, while churches and conventual buildings were either demolished or converted to secular uses such as schools, granaries, or hospitals. The ecclesiastical lordships of monasteries and bishoprics were dissolved or curtailed, altering the balance of power within the Confederacy.

A second phase took place between 1770 and 1870, driven by the Enlightenment, liberalism, and radicalism. The first measures targeted the Jesuit order after its suppression in 1773. With the Helvetic Revolution of 1798, religious institutions lost their seigneurial rights and most of their property at a stroke, and all ecclesiastical states disappeared. Although the Act of Mediation of 1803 and the Federal Pact of 1815 guaranteed the continued existence of monasteries, individual cantons proceeded with further suppressions, including St. Gall (1805) and Pfäfers (1838).

The dispute culminated in the 1841 Aargau Monastery Dispute, when the canton of Aargau suppressed all eight of its monasteries; the Federal Diet eventually required the restoration of the four women's convents, but the confessional tensions it generated contributed to the Sonderbund War of 1847. After the liberal victory, further cantons secularized their monasteries, and the Special Provisions of the Federal Constitution of 1874 prevented the re-establishment of suppressed houses until their repeal in 1973. Taken together, these processes resulted in the largest transfer of property in Swiss history.

== Literature ==
- Marcel Albert: The commemorative events for the 200th anniversary of secularization 1803–2003. A critical review. In: Roman Quarterly, 100, 2005, pp. 240–274.
- Christian Bartz: The secularization of Laach Abbey in 1802. A case study. In: Rhenish Quarterly Journals, 62, 1998, pp. 238–307.
- Paul Fabianek: Consequences of secularization for the monasteries in the Rhineland. Using the example of the Schwarzenbroich and Kornelimünster monasteries. Books on Demand, 2012, ISBN 978-3-8482-1795-3 .
- Reiner Groß : History of Saxony. Berlin 2001 (4th edition 2012, ISBN 978-3-361-00674-4).
- Volker Himmelein (ed.): Old monasteries, new masters. The secularization in the German south-west in 1803. Large State Exhibition of Baden-Württemberg 2003. Thorbecke, Ostfildern 2003, ISBN 3-7995-0212-2 (exhibition catalog and essay volume).
- Georg Mölich, Joachim Oepen, Wolfgang Rosen (eds.): Monastery culture and secularization in the Rhineland. Klartext Verlag, Essen 2002, ISBN 978-3-89861-099-5 .
- Isa Lübbers, Martin Rößler, Joachim Stüben (eds.): Secularization - a world-historical process in Hamburg. Peter Lang, Frankfurt am Main 2017, ISBN 978-3-631-67547-2 .
- Winfried Müller : A Bavarian special way? Secularization in Germany on the left and right banks of the Rhine. In: Alois Schmid (ed.): The secularization in Bavaria 1803. Culture break or modernization? CH Beck, Munich 2003, ISBN 3-406-10664-1, pp. 317–334.
- Winfried Müller: The Secularization of 1803. In: Walter Brandmüller (ed.): Handbook of Bavarian church history. Volume 3. Eos Verlag, St. Ottilien 1991, pp. 1–84.
- Winfried Müller: Between secularization and concordat. The Reorganization of Church-State Relations 1803–1821. In: Walter Brandmüller (ed.): Handbook of Bavarian church history. Volume 3. Eos Verlag, St. Ottilien 1991, pp. 85–129.
- Alfons Maria Scheglmann : History of secularization in Bavaria on the right bank of the Rhine. 3 volumes. Habbel, Regensburg 1903–1908.
- Rudolf Schlögl : Belief and religion in secularization. The Catholic City - Cologne, Aachen, Munster - 1740–1840. Munich 1995.
- Dietmar Stutzer: Secularization 1803. The storming of Bavaria's churches and monasteries. Rosenheimer Verlagshaus Alfred Förg, 1976, ISBN 3-475-52237-3 .
- Hermann Uhrig: The compatibility of Art. VII of the Peace of Lunéville with the Imperial Constitution. 5 volumes, Verlag Traugott Bautz, Nordhausen 2014, ISBN 978-3-88309-862-3; 2789 p. (at the same time expanded Jur. Diss. Tübingen 2011, urn : nbn:de:bsz:21-opus-56749).
- Eberhard Weis : Montgelas. First volume. Between Revolution and Reform 1759–1799. 2nd Edition. Beck, Munich 1988, ISBN 978-3-406-32974-6 .
- Matthias Wemhoff : Secularization and new beginnings. Schnell & Steiner, Regensburg 2007, ISBN 978-3-7954-1963-9 (on the occasion of the opening of the exhibition in the Regional Association of Westphalia-Lippe-State Museum for Monastery Culture in Dalheim Monastery).

== See also ==
- Antireligion – Opposition to religion
- Persecution of Christians
- Secular state – State or country without a state religion
- Secularism – Position that religion should not influence civic and state affairs
- Secularization – Societal transition away from religion
- Laicism
- Monasteries

== Bibliography ==
- Marcel Albert: Die Gedenkveranstaltungen zum 200. Jahrestag der Säkularisation 1803–2003. Ein kritischer Rückblick, in: Römische Quartalschrift 100 (2005) S. 240–274.
