= David Gottlieb =

David Gottlieb may refer to:

- David Gottlieb (biologist) (1911–1982), American plant pathologist
- David Gottlieb (mathematician) (1944–2008), Israeli mathematician
- David Gottlieb, founder of D. Gottlieb & Co.

== See also ==
- Dovid Gottlieb, faculty member at Ohr Somayach in Jerusalem
