= Frank Buchser =

Swiss painter (1828–1890)

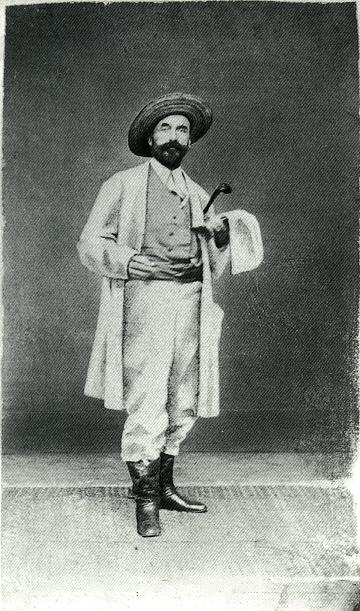
- Frank Buchser
- Born: 1828; Solothurn, Switzerland
- Died: 1890 (aged 61–62); Solothurn, Switzerland
- Education: Accademia di San Luca, Rome
- Known for: Painting
- Movement: Orientalist themes; Realism (arts); portraiture

Frank (originally Franz) Buchser (1828–1890) was a Swiss painter. He is noted for his portraits of notable American figures of the post civil war period and for his works with Oriental themes.

== Life and work ==
Born Franz Buchser on 15 August 1828 near Solothurn in Switzerland, he was the son of a farmer, Niklaus Josef and his wife Anna Maria, née Walker. At the age of 18 he was apprenticed to a piano builder and organ maker. However, his apprenticeship ended abruptly when the master found him in bed with his daughter.

In 1847, he decided to become a painter, and took drawing lessons from the Bern artist, Heinrich von Arx (1802–58). He travelled to Rome via Paris and Florence and studied art in Paris, Antwerp and at the Accademia di San Luca in Rome. While in Rome, he financed his studies by working for the Swiss Guard. Although he took art lessons here and there, the bulk of his art education was primarily self-taught.

Buchser travelled extensively in Europe, Africa and England. A personal highlight of his travels was a visit to Fez, Morocco in 1858 where he painted many street scenes and pictures of the Bedouin people. In 1862, he was active as commissioner of the Department of Swiss Art at the World's Fair in London.

In 1866, Buchser visited the United States and remained there until 1871. He painted scenes of the American plains, with an emphasis on color that was new at the time. He caught up with a military expedition led by General William T. Sherman and painted scenes of the places they visited, including Fort Laramie. While in the US, he painted portraits of many notable personalities, including President Andrew Johnson, Secretary of State, William Seward and General Sherman and the last known portrait of Robert E. Lee. He also painted a series depicting African Americans in a sympathetic manner. During this period, he Americanised his name to Frank, and retained that form for the rest of his life.

In his final years, he returned to his native Switzerland where he campaigned for a reform of the art exhibition system and was a supporter of the "Swiss Federal Decree on the Promotion and Elevation of Swiss Art" (1887). From 1888 to 1890 he was one of the members of the Federal Art Commission.

Stylistically, Buchser's work was very versatile. He has been described as an Orientalist painter and as a realist. His oeuvre comprises about 1000 works in oil, including about 300 full paintings. The remainder are mostly independent sketches, often executed with spiritedly rapid strokes, which show the artist's pronounced sense of color and light. The most important collection of his works are in the Kunstmuseum Solothurn (80 paintings) and the Kunstmuseum Basel (over 1000 oil sketches, drawings and watercolors and sketchbooks).

He died on November 22, 1890, in Solothurn.

== Select list of paintings ==
- Street Scene in Algiers (c.1850)
- Bedouin Seated with Pen and Paper n.d.
- Naked Slave with Tambourine
- Portrait of Andrew Johnson
- Portrait of Robert E. Lee (c. 1870; Currently in the residence of the Swiss ambassador to the U.S., Washington D.C.)
- Portrait of William Tecumseh Sherman (Currently in the residence of the Swiss ambassador to the U.S., Washington D.C.)
- Portrait of William Seward
- The Song of Mary Blane
- Four Black Marble Players (1867)
- Old Virginia (c. 1870)
- Los Tres Amigos n.d.

== Gallery ==
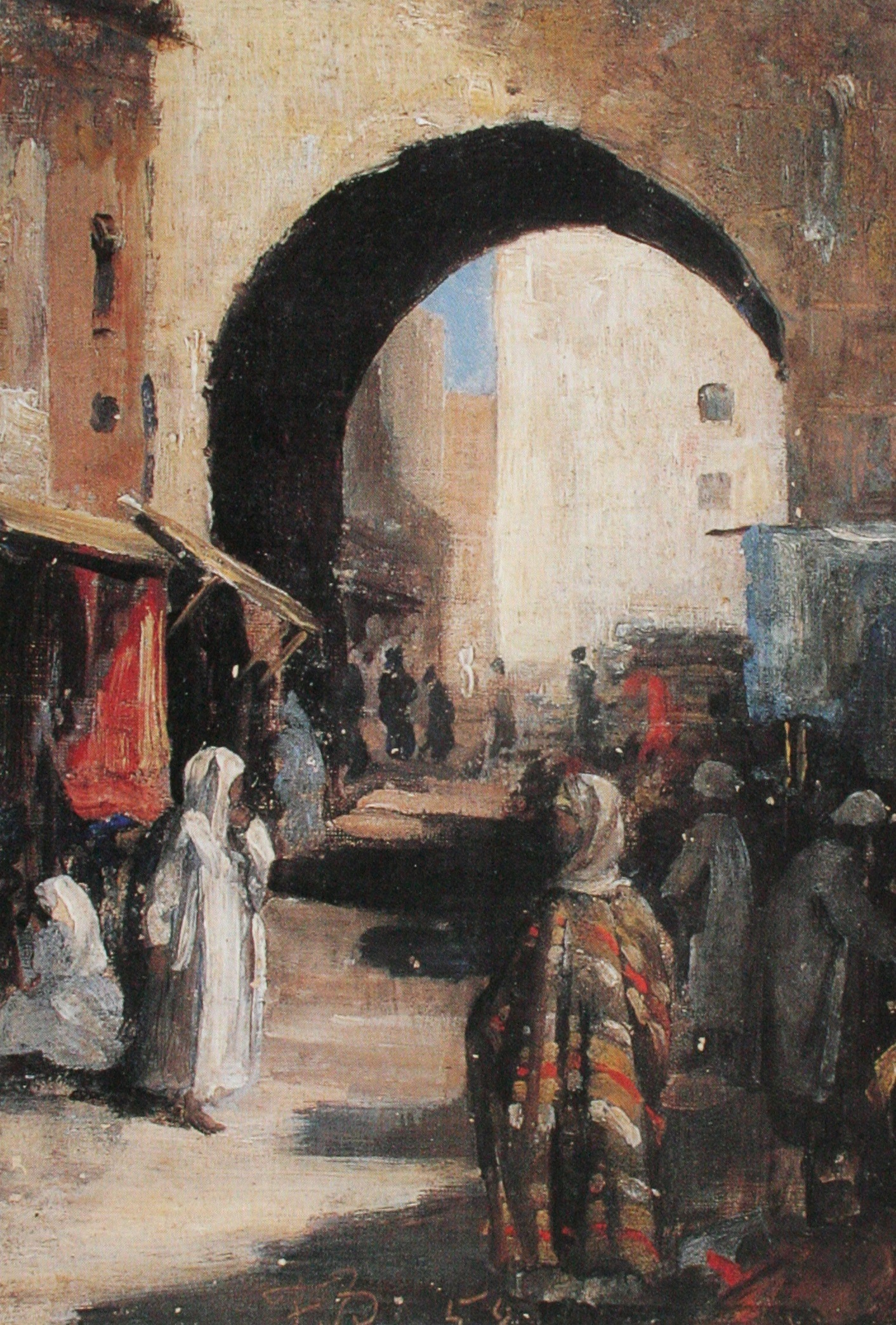
City Gate in Fez, 1858

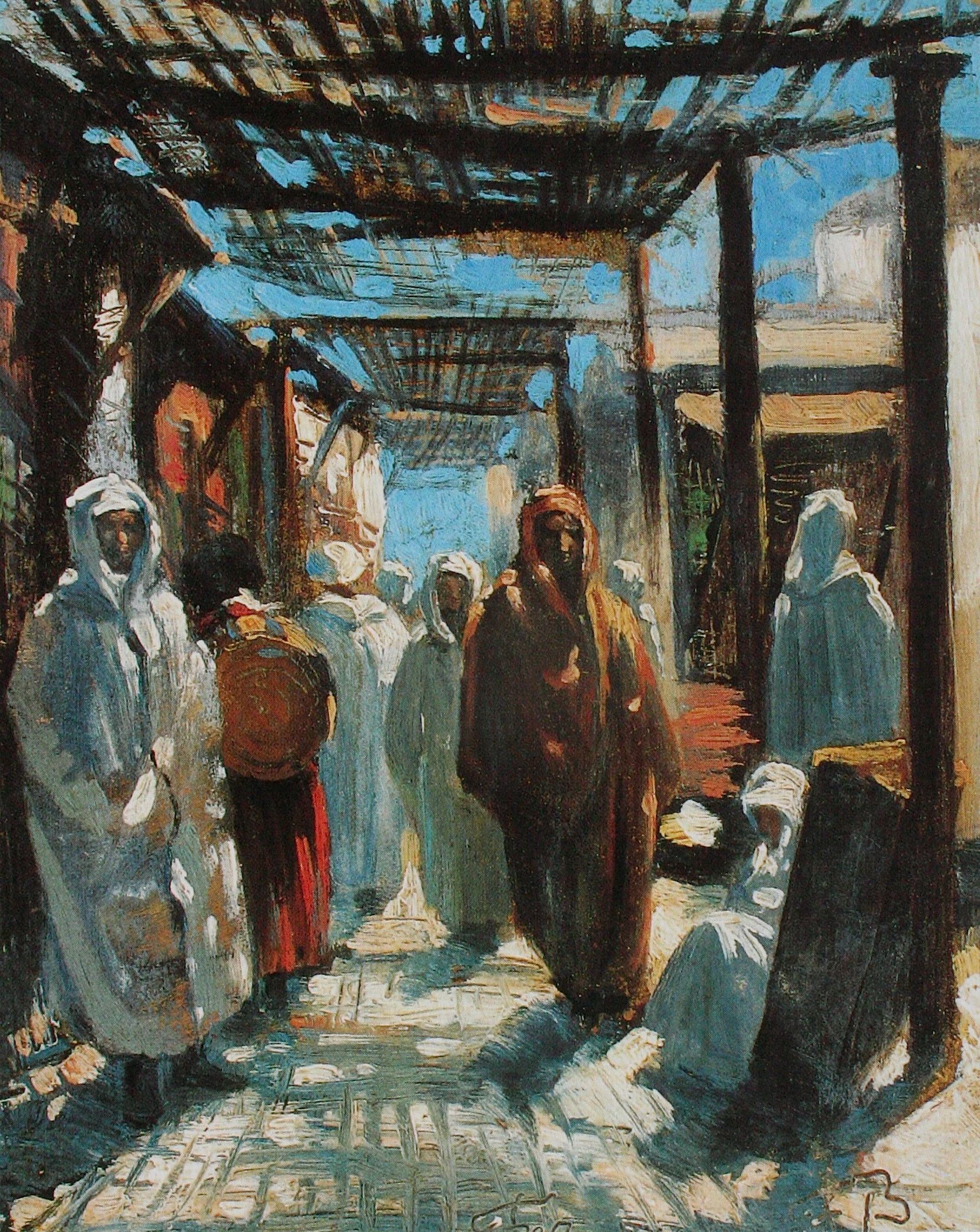
Alley in Fez, 1858

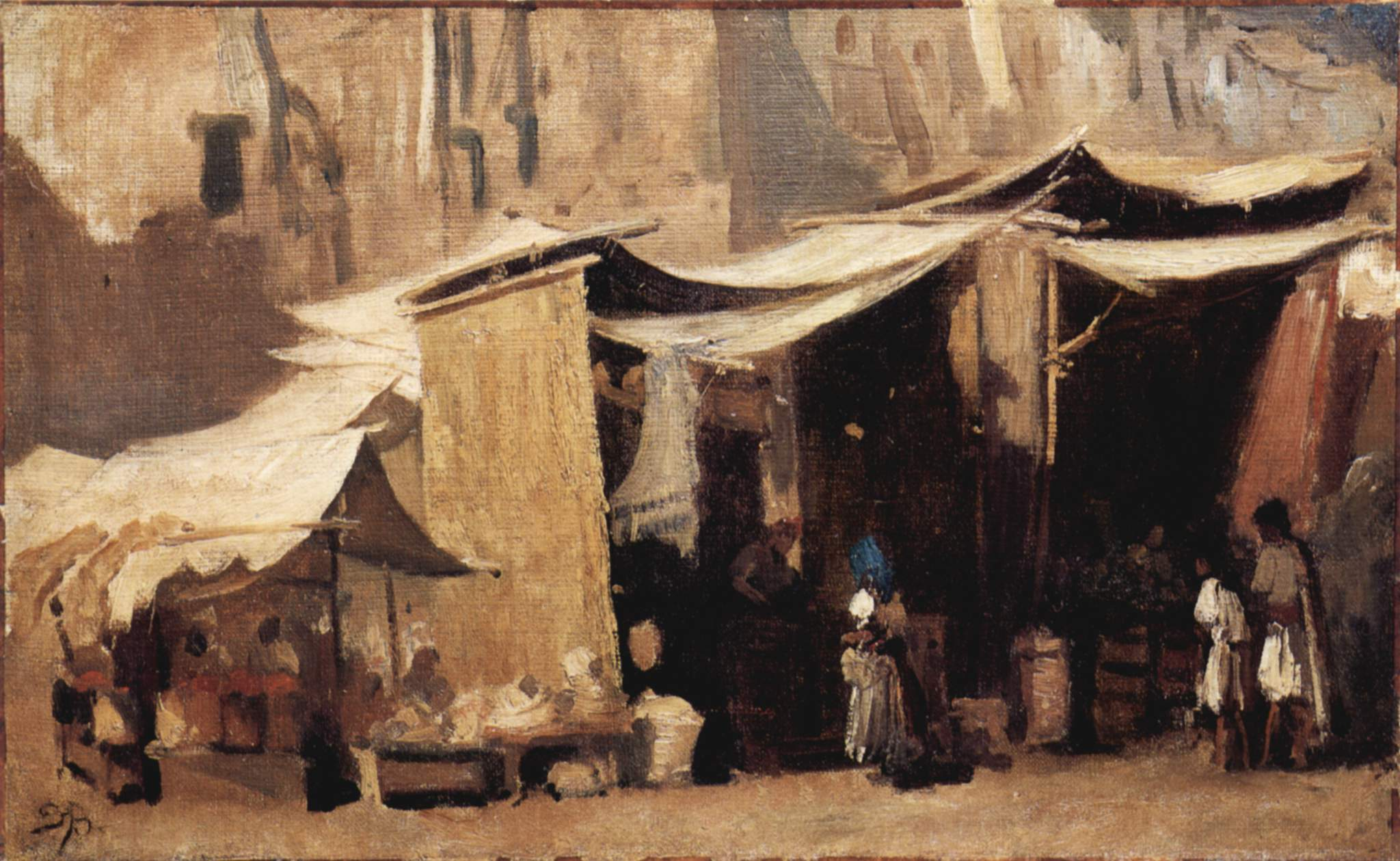
Street scene in Algiers, c. 1850

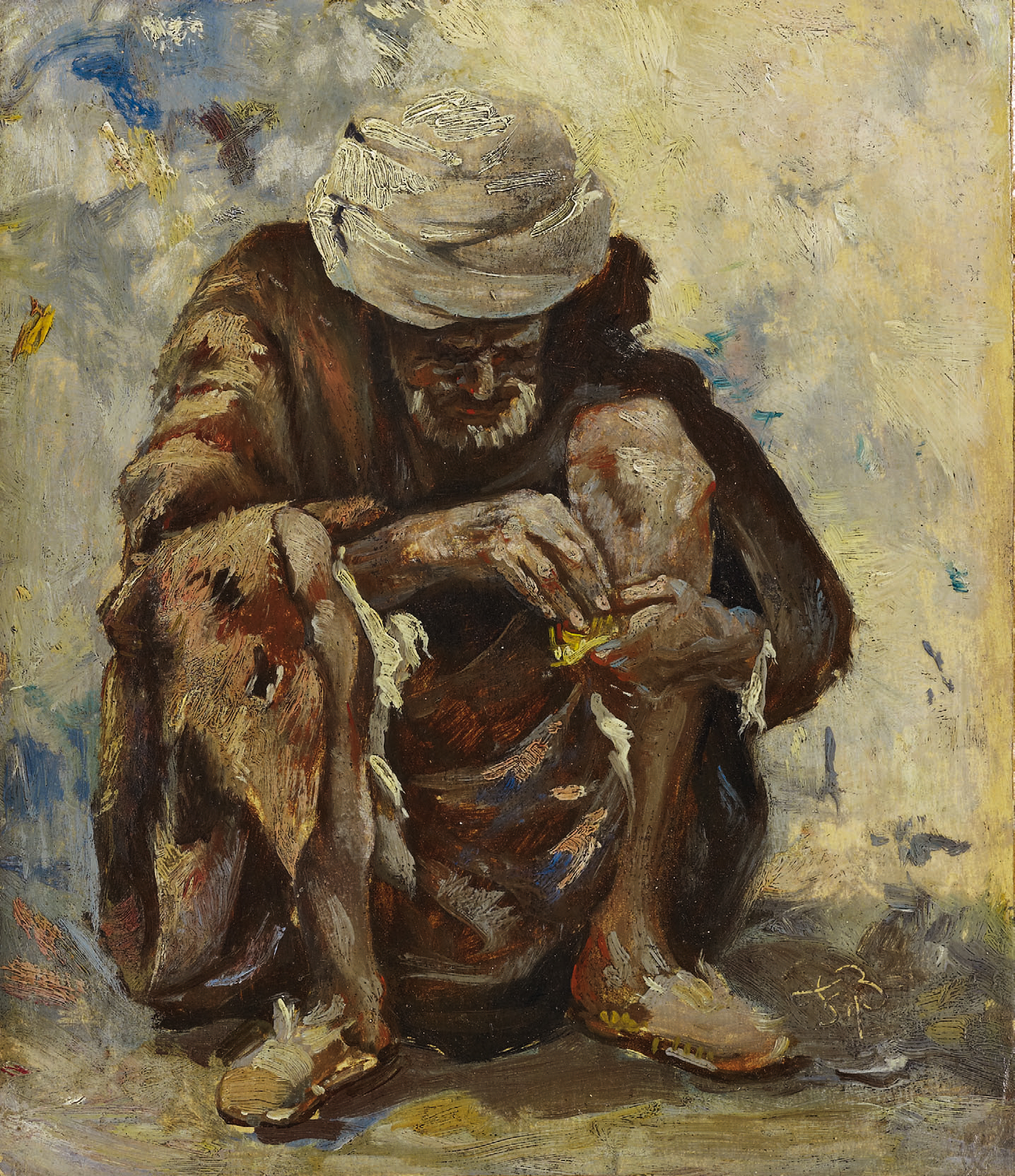
Crouching Moroccan, c. 1858.

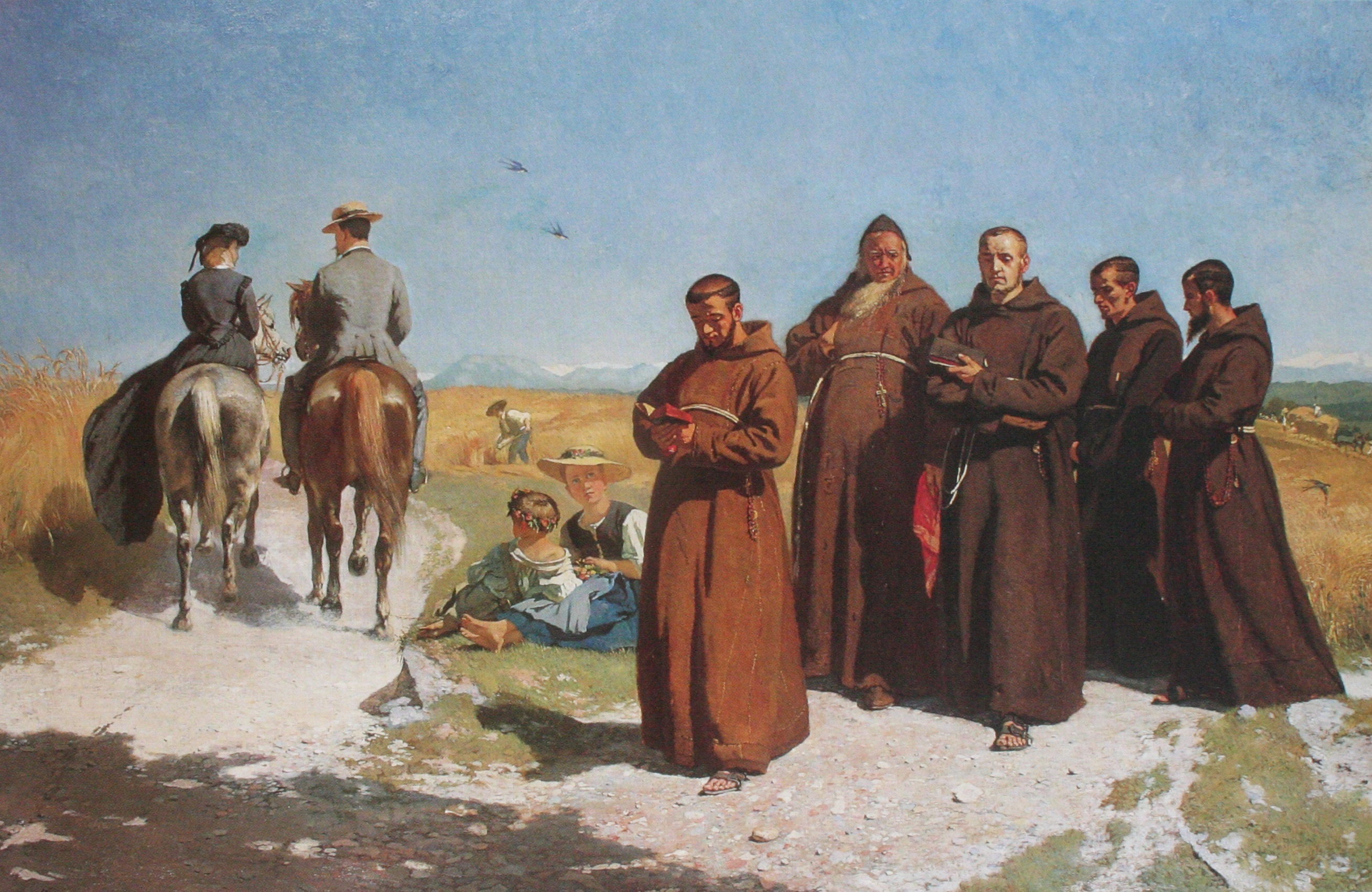
Asceticism and zest for life, 1865

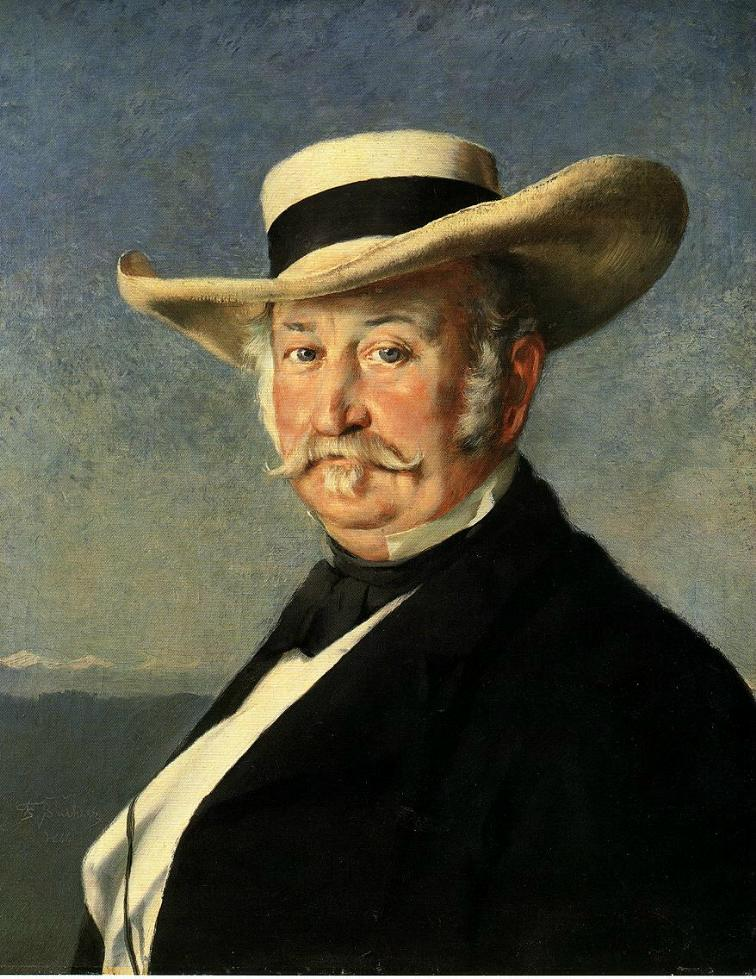
Portrait of Johann August Sutter, 1866

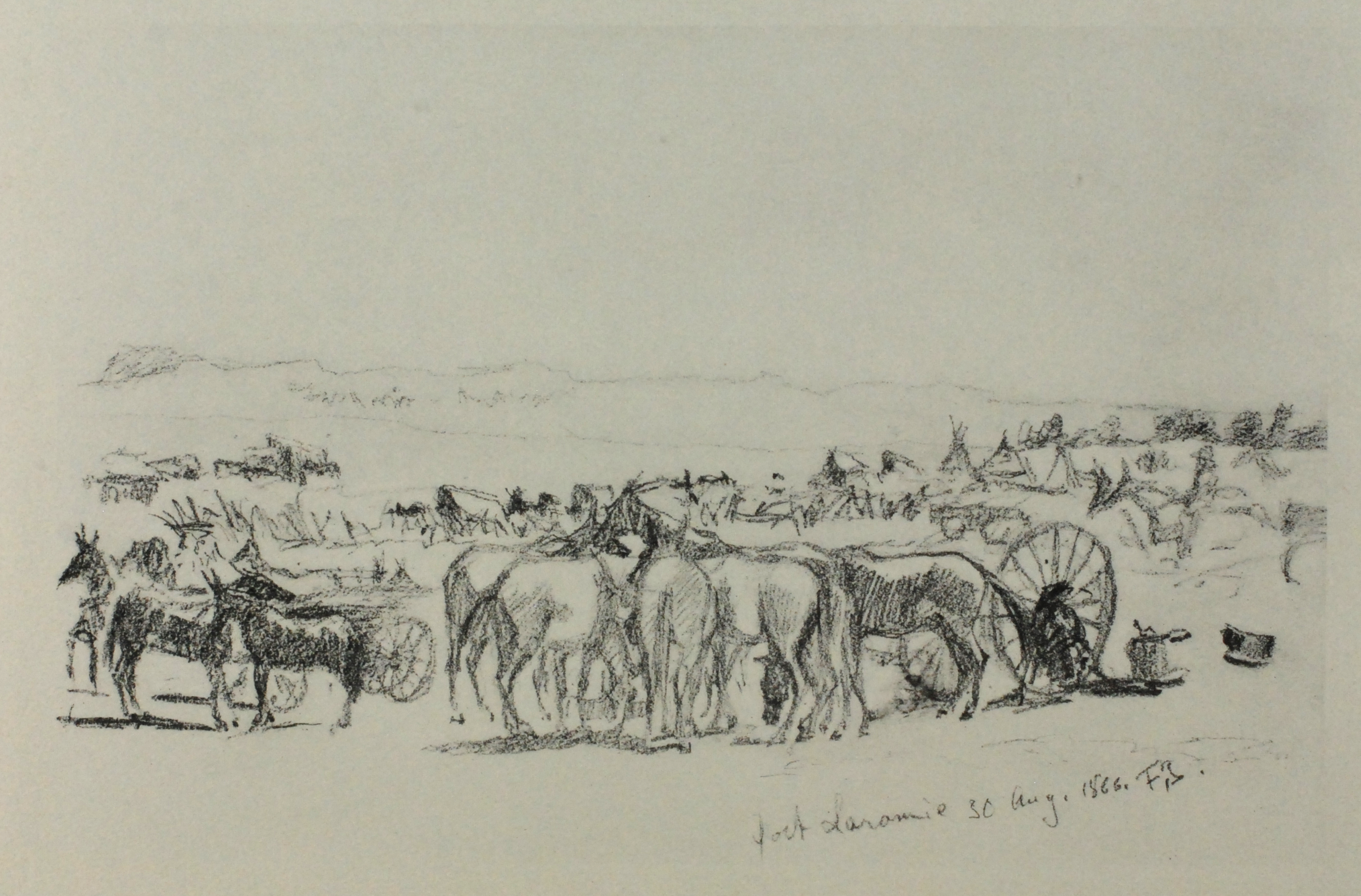
Fort Laramie, 30 August 1866

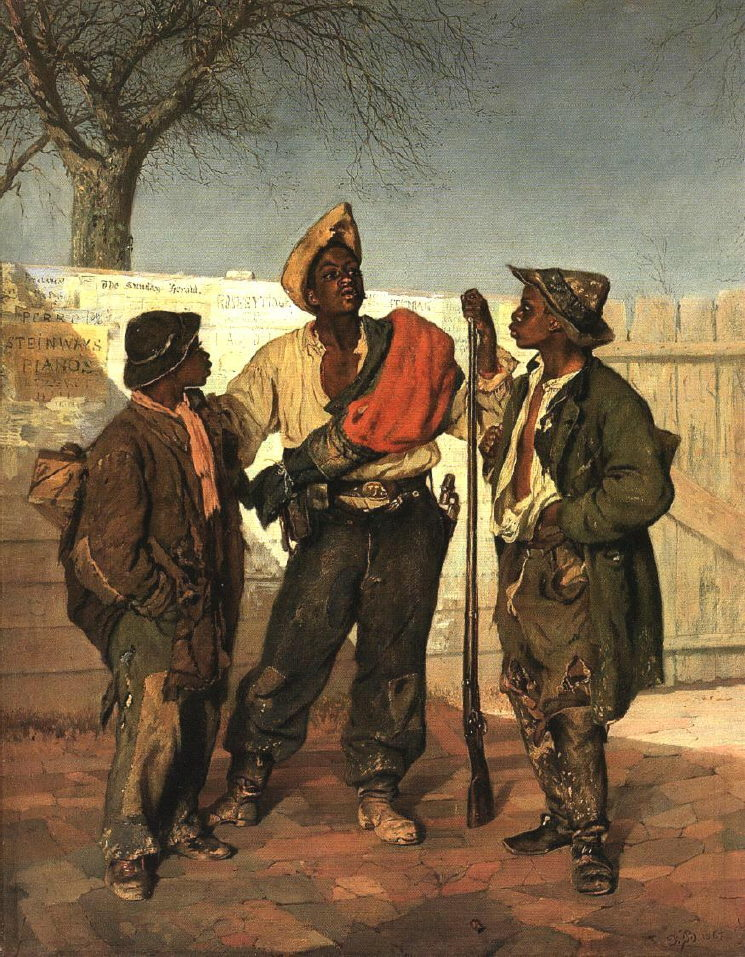
The volunteers return, 1867

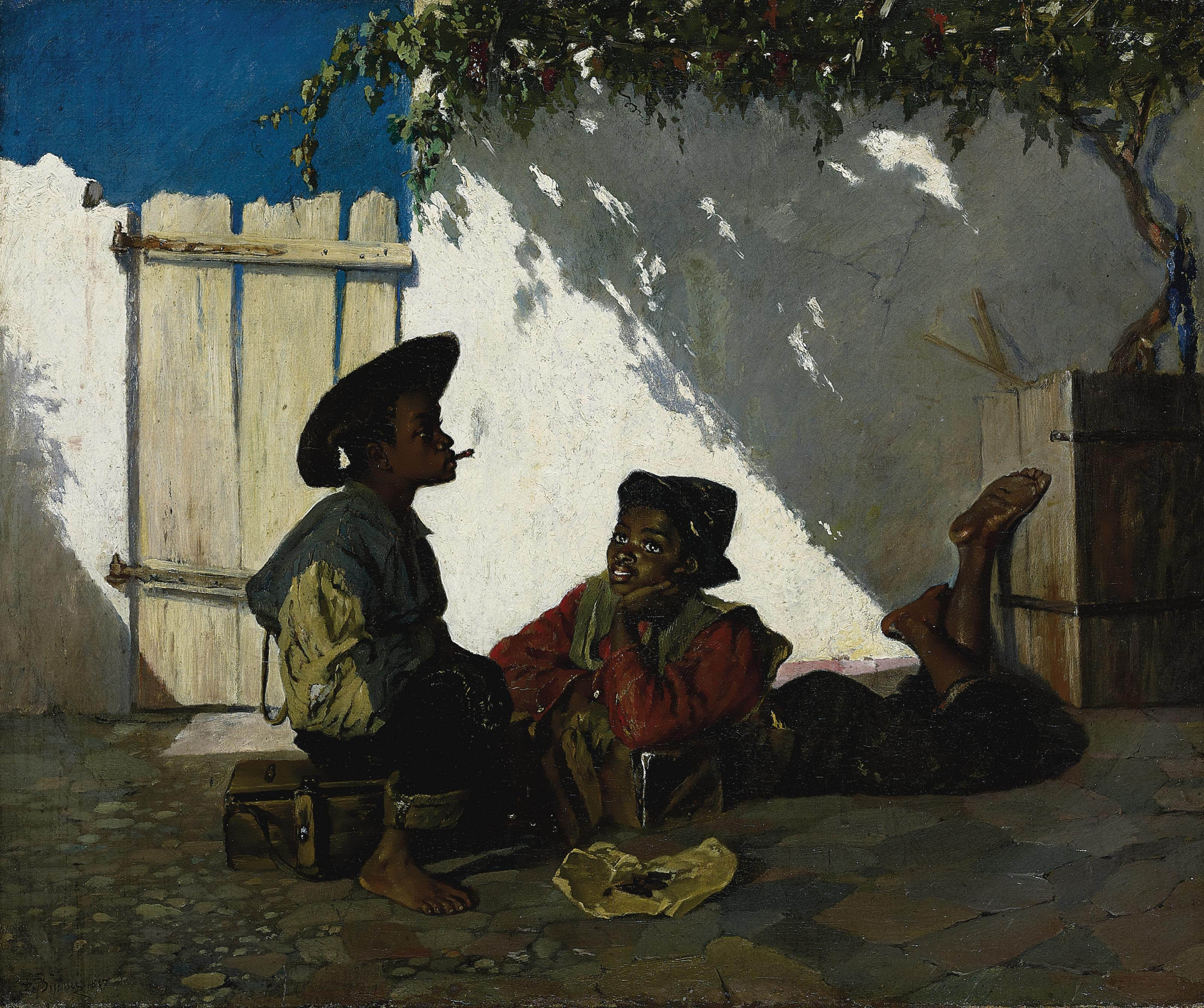
Dolce far niente ("Doing Nothing") 1867

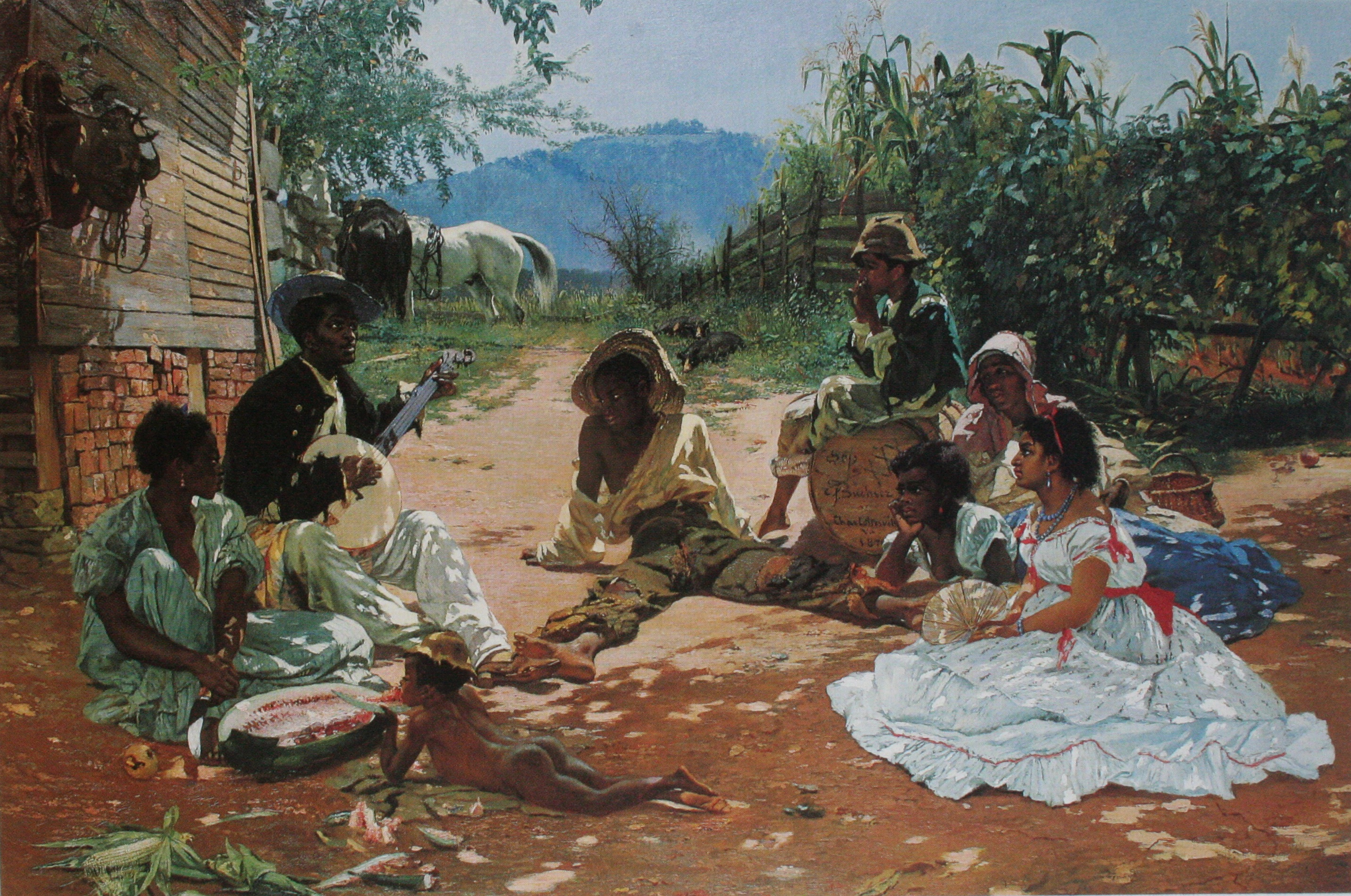
The Song of Mary Blane, Charlottesville, Virginia, 1870.

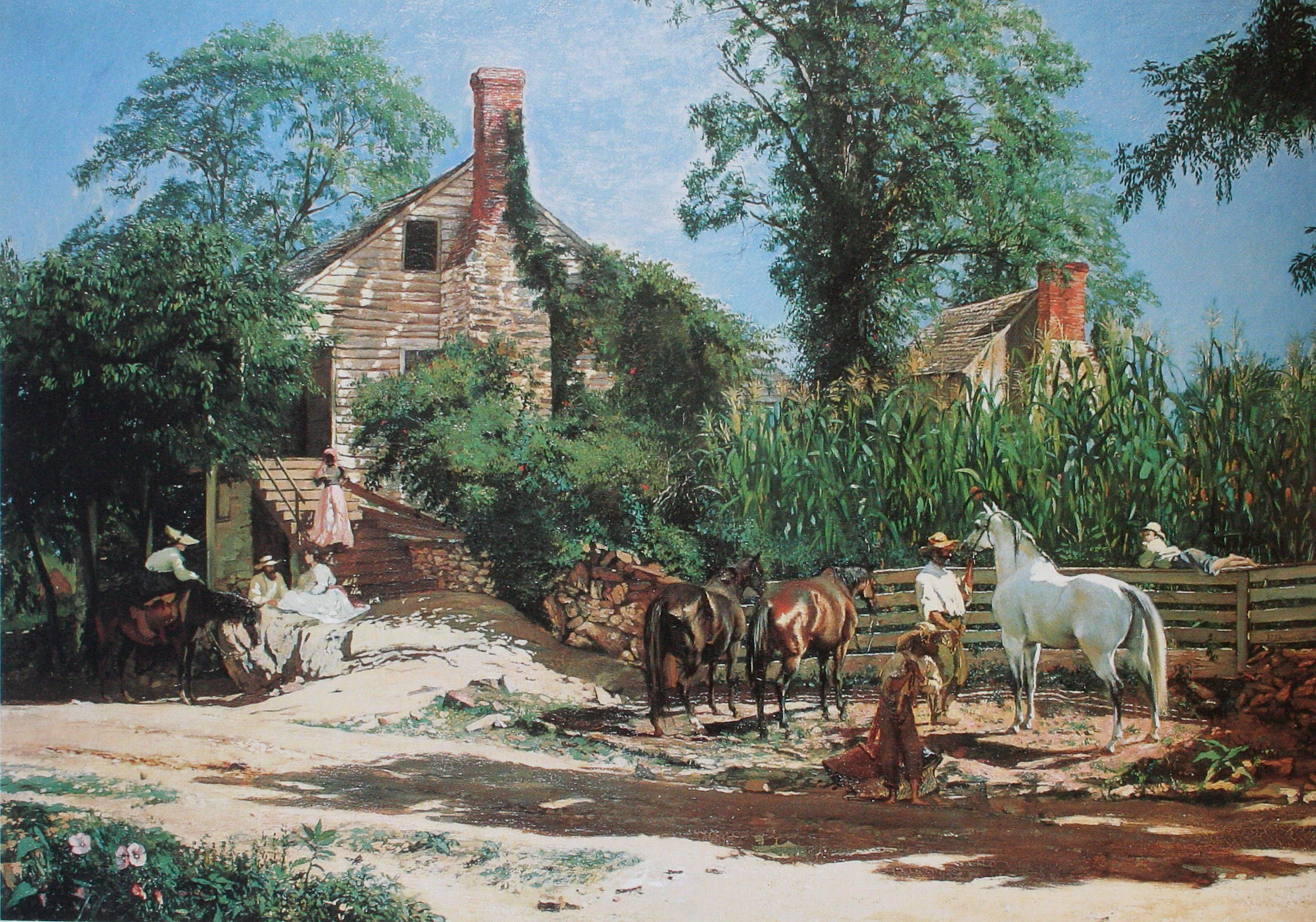
Old Virginia, c. 1870

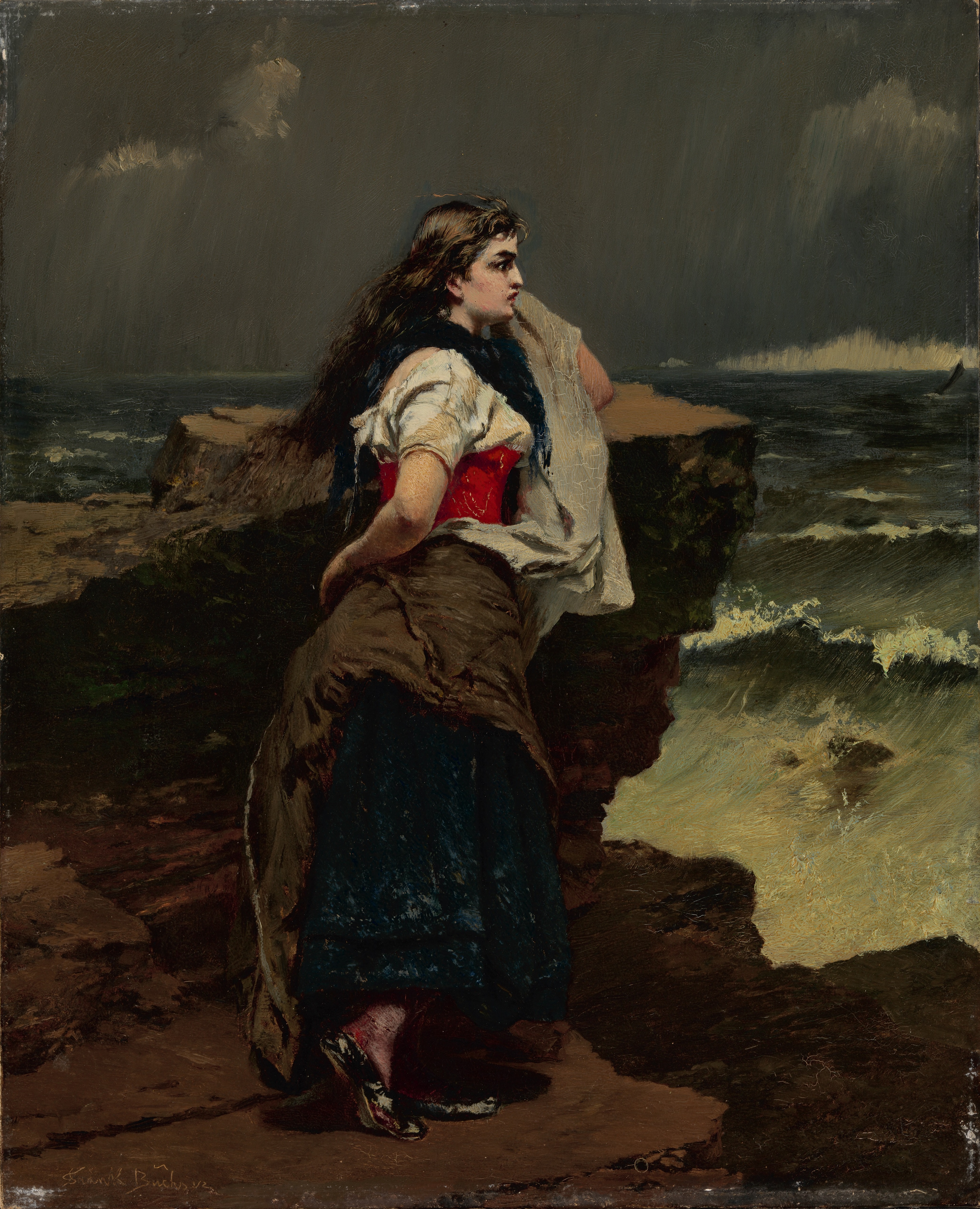
Fishergirl by the Sea, depicting "Fanny", undated.

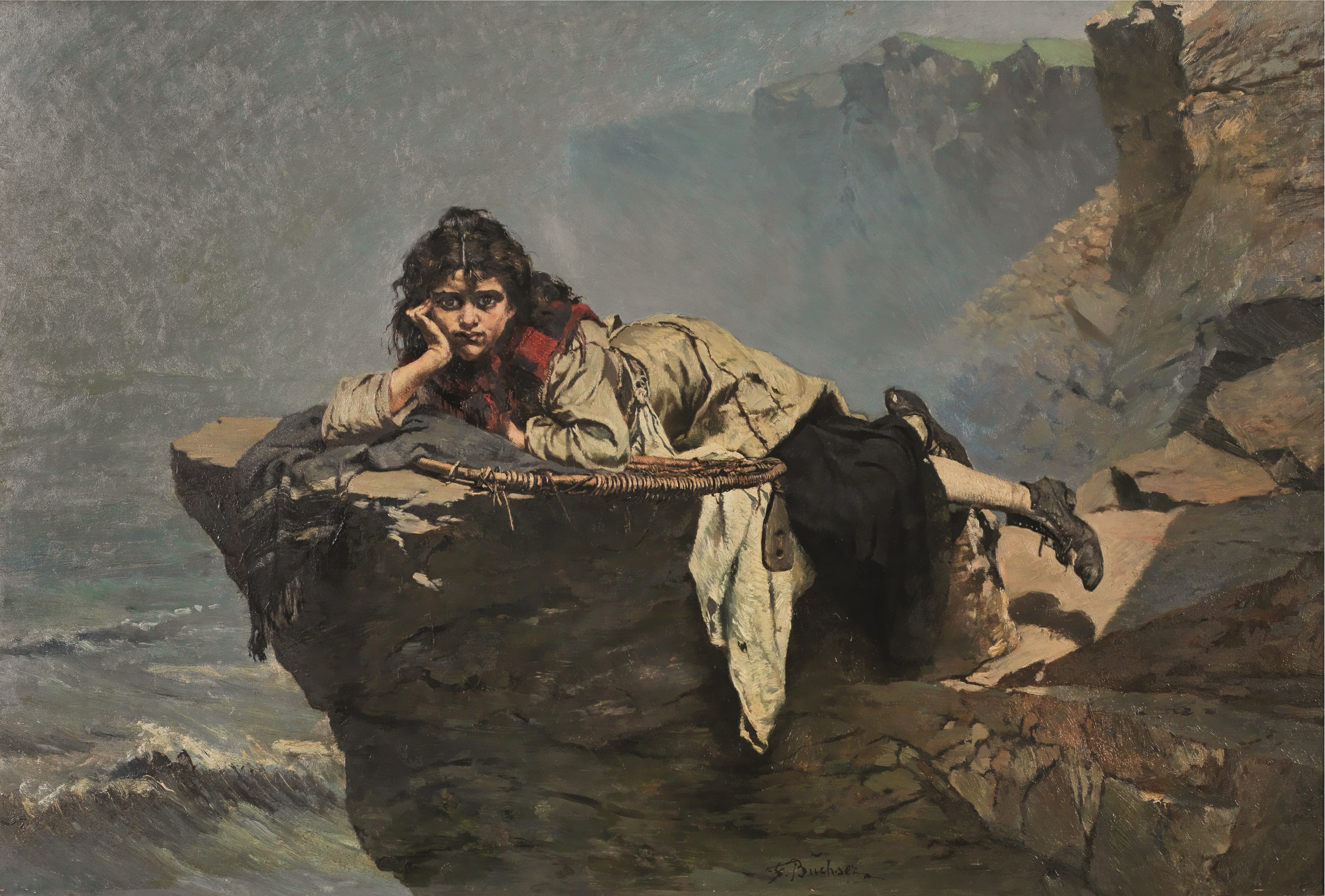
Flood encirclements, 1876, depicting Fanny.

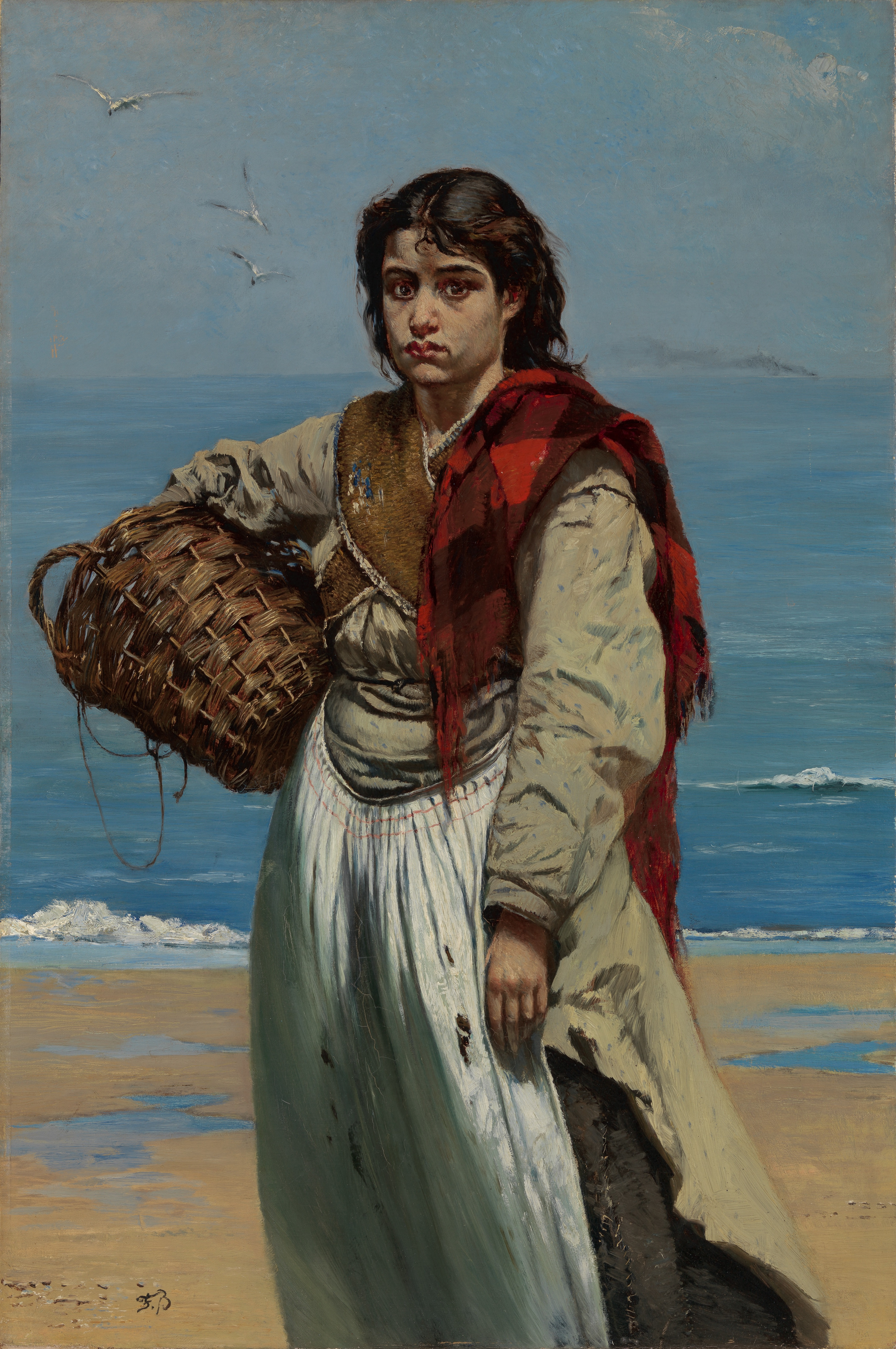
Young girl with a basket on the beach, 1876, depicting Fanny.

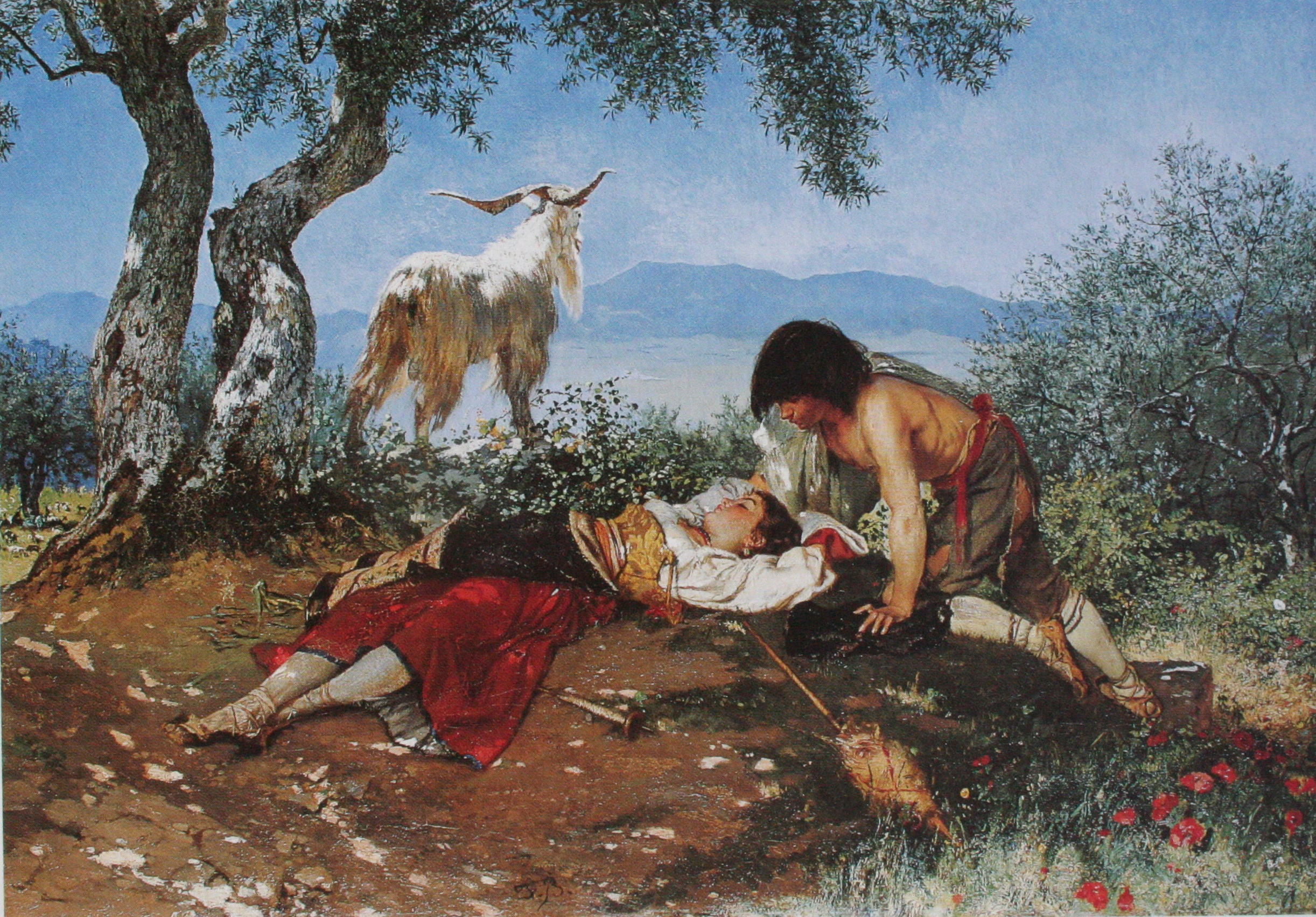
The Kiss, 1878.

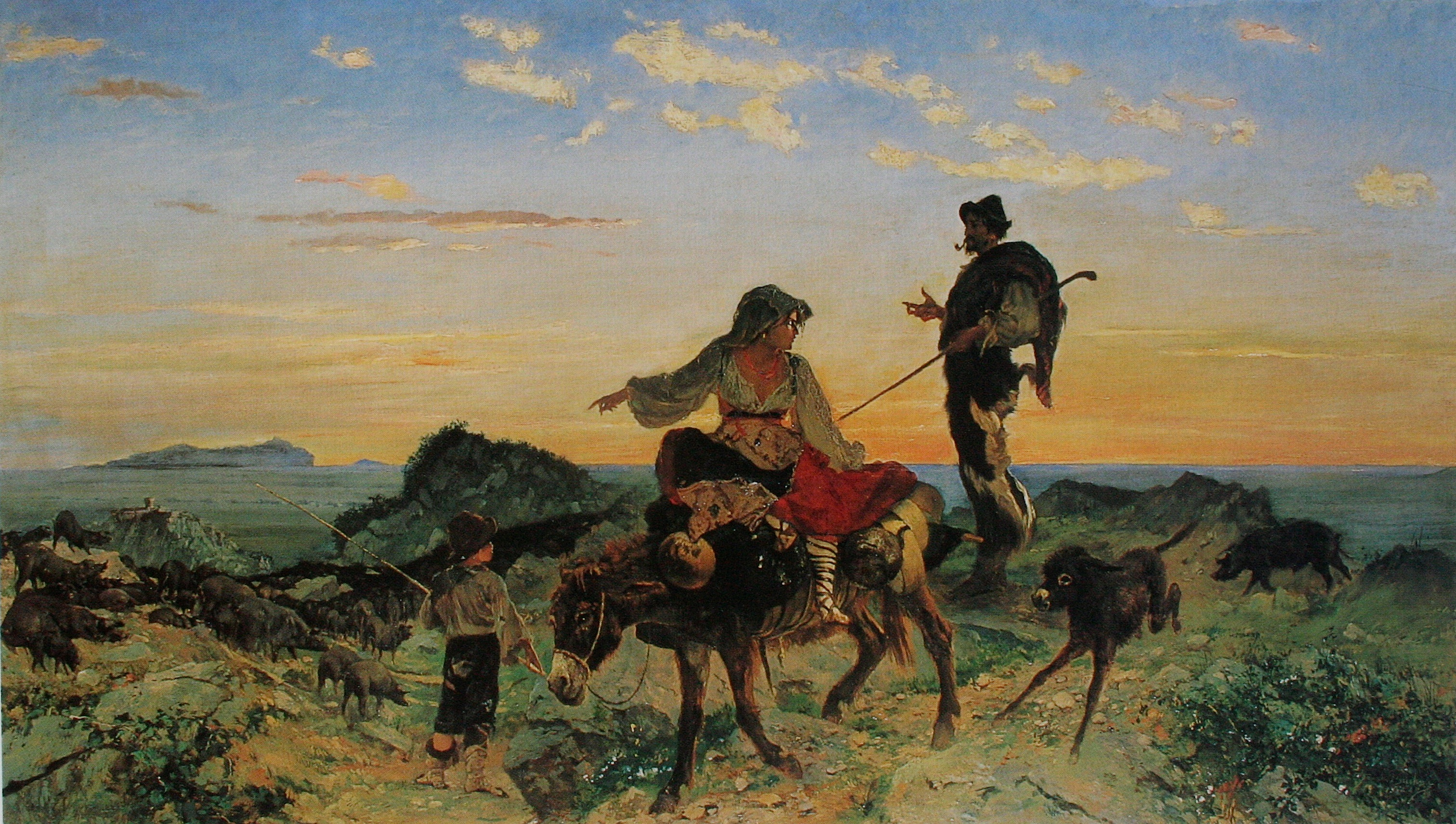
The divine swineherd, 1882.
