= Anna Jaffé =

Belgian-French art collector (1845-1942)

- Born: c. 1845
- Died: 5 March 1942 (aged 96–97); Nice, France

Anna Emilie Jaffé (née Gluge; c. 1845 – 5 March 1942) was a Belgian Jewish art collector.

She was the daughter of Brussels physician and professor Theophilus Gottlieb Gluge a German Jew who had immigrated to Belgium during the 1830s and his wife Johanna Gluge. By the middle of the eighteenth century, members of the Gluge family left Germany and settled in Northern Ireland. There, Anna met and married John Jaffé (1843-1934), a Belfast-based exporter of Irish linen and lace on 3 June 1873 at the Brussels Town Hall.

After her husband retired from professional life in Belfast, Ireland, Anna persuaded her husband to choose Nice for their residence although the couple also owned homes in Monte Carlo and Neufchatel. In Nice they took up residency at what would come to be known as the Villa Jaffé, located on the Promenade des Anglais where they would live for five decades. The couple never had children but their cultural life has been documented by various sources. Anna was an avid art collector and was influenced in her purchases by the German art historian and museum curator Wilhelm von Bode. With his large fortune and Anna’s excellent taste for purchasing artworks, the contents of the Jaffé residence rivalled the holdings of a small museum. Their collection is known to have contained Old Masters paintings, including works created by Goya, Rembrandt, Constable, Francesco Guardi, Isaac van Ostade and J.M.W. Turner, some of which were purchased in Paris through the dealer Charles Sedelmeyer. The home also included exquisite furniture and tapestries.

In celebration of their Diamond wedding anniversary, John and Anna purchased Napoleon and Marie-Louise's library in 1933 to donate to the Musée de Malmaison. Also patrons of the Musée Masséna in Nice, Anna and her husband regularly lent artwork from their collection to exhibitions, such as in 1934, Les Anglais dans le comté de Nice, a show devoted to British art to which the Jaffés lent paintings by Gainsborough, Constable, and Turner.

On 3 May 1934 John and Anna were granted by the mayor of Nice, in the name of France, the Croix de Chevalier de la légion d'Honneur for their cultural contributions. Though her husband died later that same year at age 91, Anna lived until 1942, and thus witnessed the Vichy Government crackdown on the Jews. Though she originally planned to leave her collection to various state institutions, as all the Jewish contacts at those institutions slowly disappeared she made the decision to change her will and leave everything to her nieces and nephews. Little did she know that her nieces and nephews lives were threatened at the time she died.

In July 1943 the Jaffé villa and all the Jaffé artworks, more than 60 paintings in total, were seized by the Vichy government. Many were sold at under the orders of the Commissioner for Jewish Questions of the French State (Commissariat aux questions juives de l’Etat Français)in the grand hall of the Savoy Hotel in Nice on July 12 and 13, 1943.

Though one nephew made numerous inquiries after the war, it was her grand-nephew Alain Monteagle who eventually managed to recuperate some of the family's property choosing to focus on the 200 well-documented paintings sold in the auction, mostly purchased by Anna in consultation with Bode. In the nearly eight decades since her artworks were stolen, eleven paintings have been returned to the remaining Jaffé heirs.

== Restituted works ==
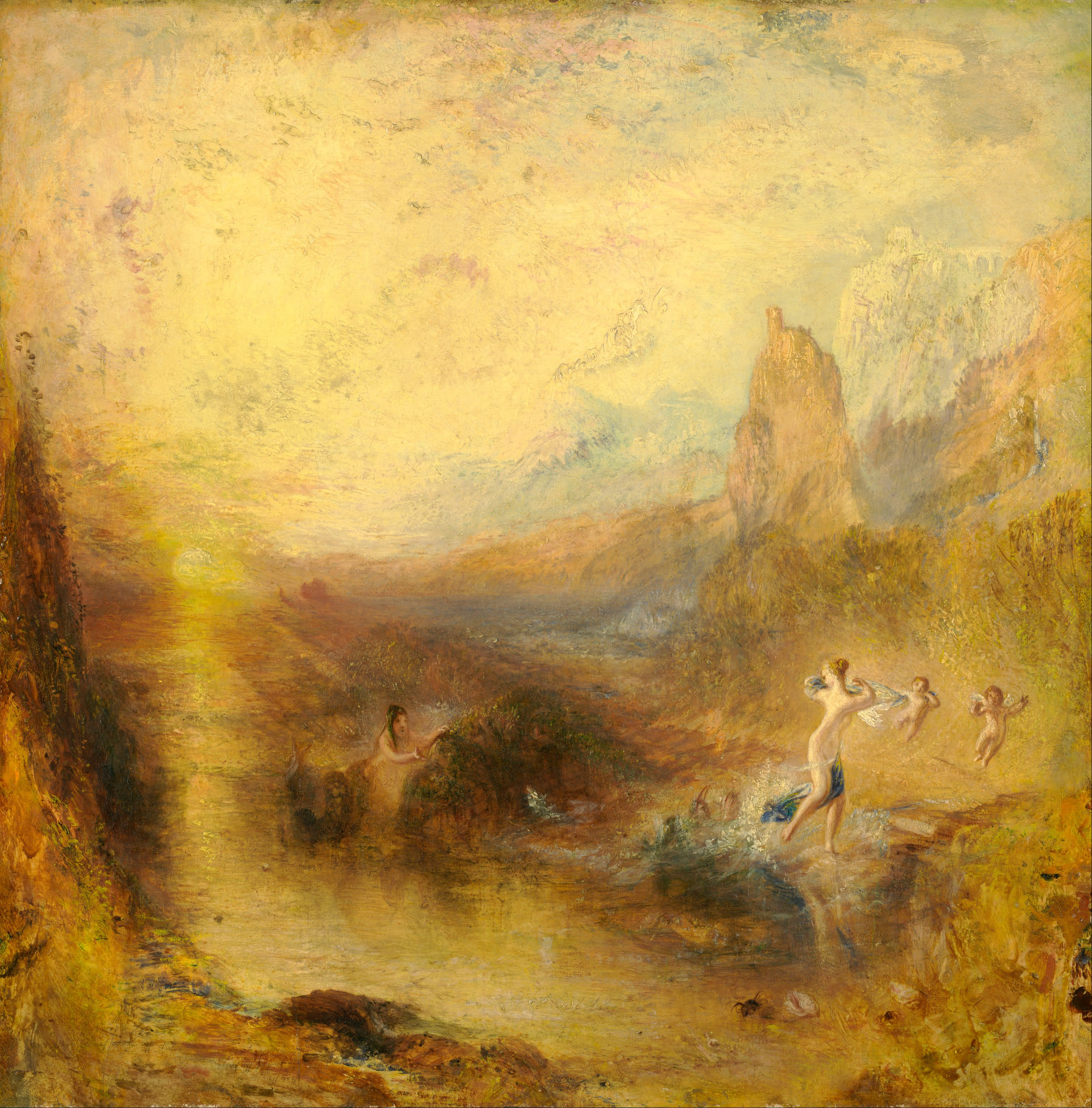
Glaucus and Scylla, by J. M. W. Turner

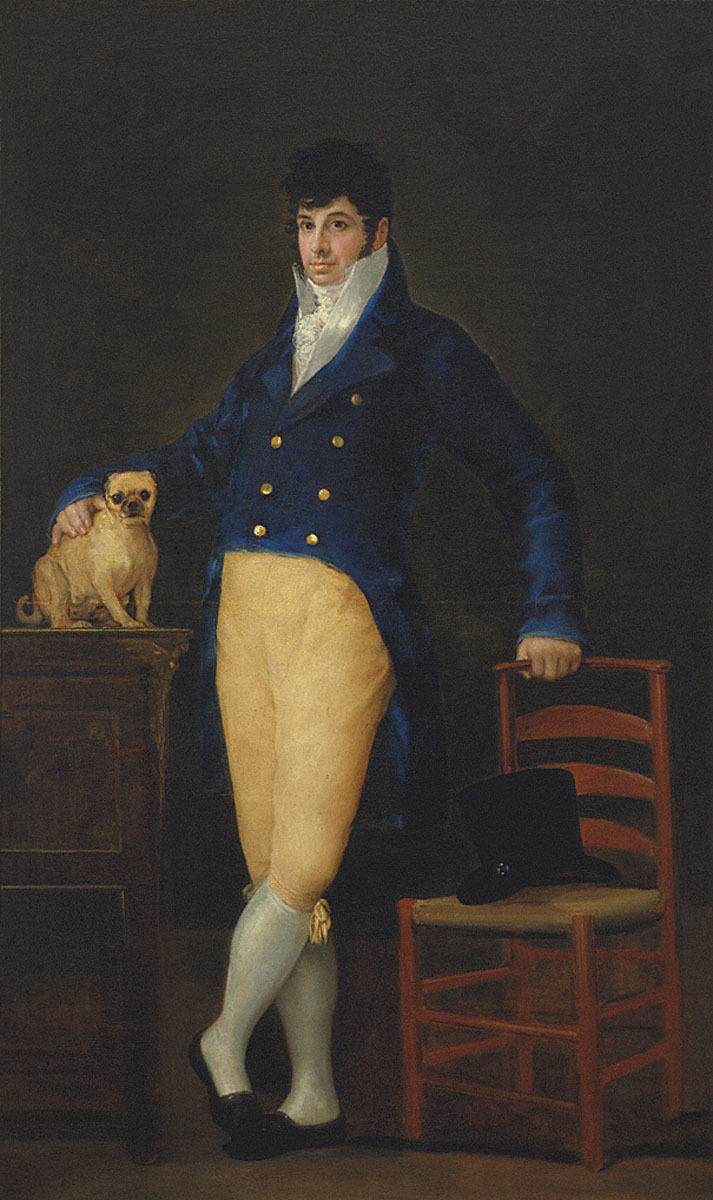
Manuel García de la Prada by Goya

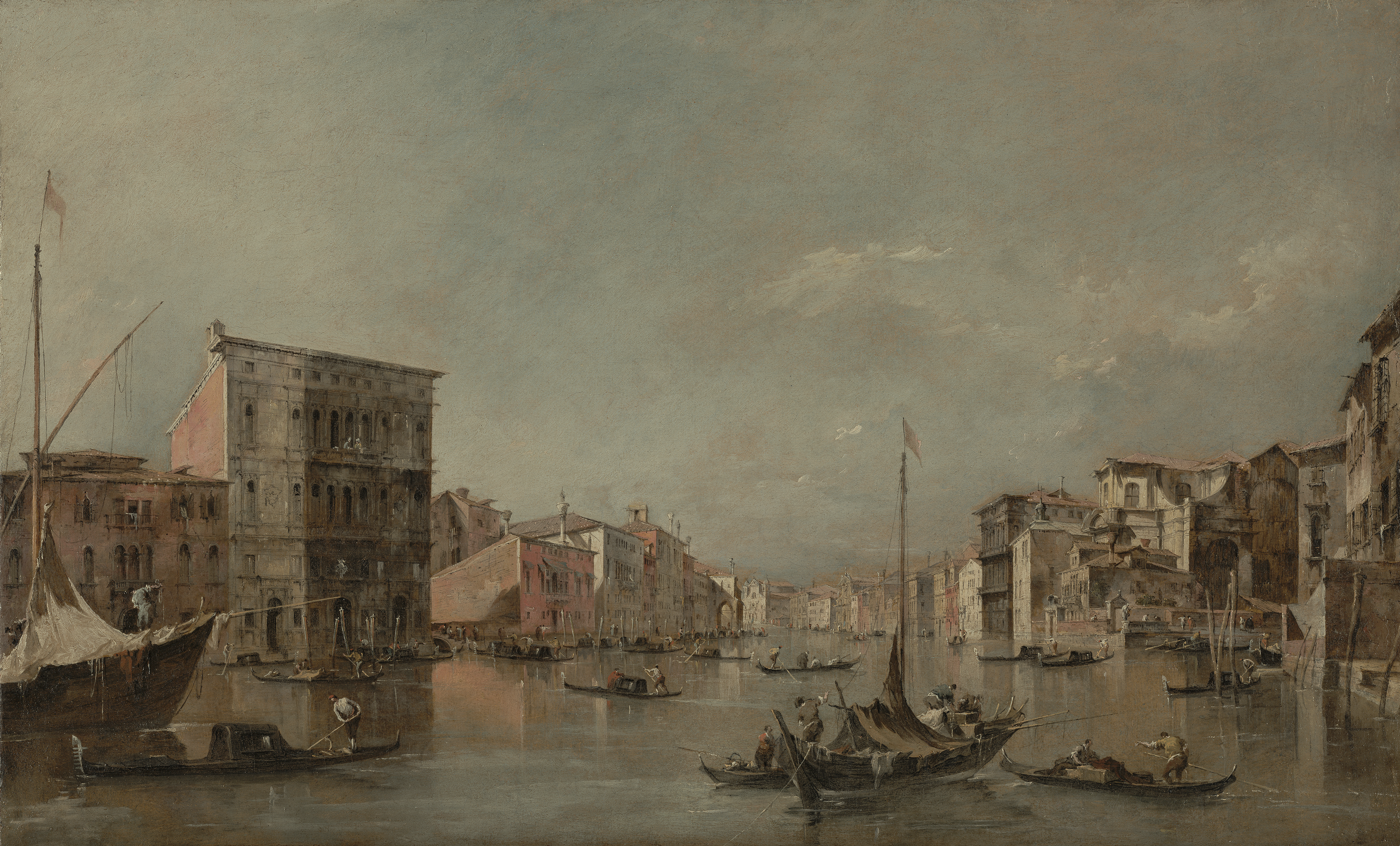
The Grand Canal in Venice with Palazzo Bembo, by Francesco Guardi
