= Gotlieb =

Gotlieb is a surname. Notable people with the name include:

- Allan Gotlieb (1928–2020), Canadian public servant and author
- Calvin Gotlieb (1921–2016), Canadian professor, widower of Phyllis
- Marcel Gotlieb or Gotlib (1934–2016), French cartoonist
- Phyllis Gotlieb (1926-2009), Canadian author and poet
- Ruth Gotlieb (died 2019), local politician in Wellington, New Zealand
- Sondra Gotlieb (born 1936), Canadian journalist and novelist
- David Gotlieb (born 1958), American attorney and amateur golfer

== See also ==
- Gottlieb (name), given name and surname
