= Sigal Gottlieb =

Applied mathematician

- Education: Brown University
- Known for: Numerical analysis
- Scientific career
- Fields: Mathematics
- Workplaces: University of Massachusetts Dartmouth
- Doctoral advisor: Chi-Wang Shu

Sigal Gottlieb is an applied mathematician. She is a professor of mathematics and (since 2013) the director of the Center for Scientific Computing and Visualization Research at the University of Massachusetts Dartmouth.

== Life ==
Sigal Gottlieb is the daughter and co-author of applied mathematician David Gottlieb. She completed her undergraduate, masters and her Ph.D. at Brown University. She defended her Ph.D. thesis in 1998 under the supervision of Chi-Wang Shu; her dissertation was Convergence to Steady State of Weighted ENO Schemes, Norm Preserving Runge-Kutta Methods and a Modified Conjugate Gradient Method.

== Research ==
Gottlieb's interests lie in the numerical simulation of the partial differential equations used in aerodynamics.

She has authored the following books :

- Spectral Methods for Time-Dependent Problems (with Jan S. Hesthaven and David Gottlieb, Cambridge Monographs on Applied and Computational Mathematics, 21, Cambridge University Press, 2007)
- Strong Stability Preserving Runge–Kutta and Multistep Time Discretizations (with David Ketcheson and Chi-Wang Shu, World Scientific, 2011)

Gottlieb directs UMass Dartmouth's Center for Scientific Computing & Visualization Research, which is a research center with over 30 faculty, multiple computational clusters, and an international advisory board. She founded the Center in 2013 with a colleague, Gaurav Khanna. She served as Deputy Director of the Institute for Computational and Experimental Research in Mathematics (ICERM) from 2017 to 2021, and as of 2021 she serves as Associate Director for Special Projects there.

== Recognition ==
In 2019 Gottlieb was named a SIAM Fellow "for her contribution to strong-stability-preserving time discretizations and other schemes for hyperbolic equations, and for her professional services including those to SIAM and women in mathematics". Gottlieb was named a Fellow of the Association for Women in Mathematics in the Class of 2021 "for exemplary and lasting work in forging an active and positive research environment, proactive outreach, effective mentoring, and promoting the success of women in mathematical and computational sciences".
