= Theofelus =

Theofelus is both a surname and a given name. Notable people with the name include:

- Emma Theofelus (born 1996 or 1997), Namibian politician
- Theofelus Eiseb (1956–2009), Namibian politician

== See also ==
- Theophilus
