= Gottlieb Gluge =

German physician (1812–1898)

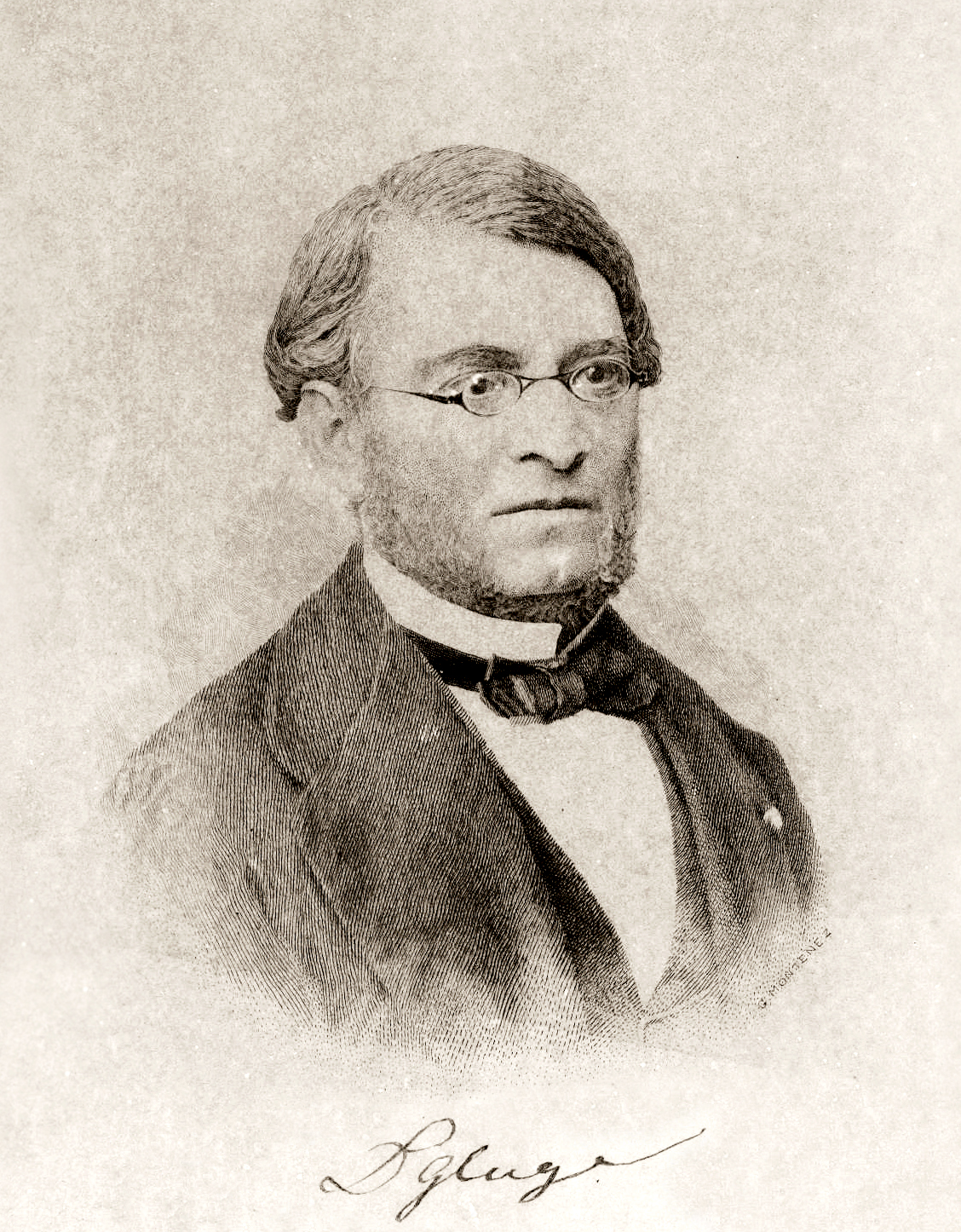
Gottlieb Gluge

Gottlieb (Théophile) Gluge (18 June 1812, Brakel, Germany – 22 December 1898, Nice, France) pioneer medical researcher and personal physician to the King of the Belgians. He studied medicine at the Berlin University, receiving his M.D. in 1835. Two years before his graduation he wrote Die Influenza oder Grippe, nach den Quellen Historisch-Pathologisch Dargestellt (Minden, 1837), receiving for this essay a prize from the faculty of his alma mater. He had the distinction of being the first physician to describe influenza.

After finishing his studies, Gluge went to Paris in 1836 to take a postgraduate course. In 1838, upon the recommendation of Alexander von Humboldt and of Arago, he was appointed professor of physiology at the Free University of Brussels, and he held this position until 1873, being also for many years physician to the German-born Belgian monarch Leopold I. In 1846 he became a naturalized Belgian citizen, and after resigning his professorship in 1873 he resided at Brussels, though he spent much time in traveling. He was a member of the Royal Academies for Science and the Arts of Belgium, which till this day give a biannual prize in his honor, in the field of physiology.

Gluge was one of the first physicians who examined microscopically the diseased tissues of the body, in this way seeking to gain knowledge of the primary causes of maladies, and thus to ascertain the correct course of treatment. He discovered a curious parasite in the stickleback, to which the name Glugea microspora has been given. He contributed to the leading medical journals of Germany, France, and Belgium.

Among notable works are the following: Anatomisch-Mikroskopische Untersuchungen zur Allgemeinen und Speziellen. Pathologle, vol. i., Minden and Leipsic, 1839; vol. ii., Jena, 1841; Abhandlungen zur Physiologie und Pathologie, Jena, 1841; Atlas der Pathologischen Anatomie, Jena, 1843 to 1850; La Nutrition, ou la Vie Considérée dans Ses Rapports avec les Aliments, Brussels, 1856; Abcès de la Rate et Sa Guérison, ib. 1870. Gluge also authored the volumes dealing with physiology in the Encyclopédie populaire which aired in Belgium in the 1850s.

His daughter Anna Gluge married an Irish merchant and became a notable art collector.
