= Mark Gottlieb =

Mark Gottlieb may refer to:

- Mark Gottlieb (politician) (born 1956), member of the Wisconsin State Assembly
- Mark Gottlieb (Neighbours), a character from the Australian soap opera Neighbours
