= Patriarch Theophilus =

Patriarch Theophilus or Theophilos may refer to:

- Theophilus of Antioch, ruled in 169–182
- Theophilus I of Alexandria, ruled in 385–412
- Theophilus II (Coptic patriarch of Alexandria), reigned 952–956
- Theophilus II (Greek patriarch of Alexandria), reigned 1010–1020
- Theophilus III of Alexandria, Greek patriarch 1805–1825
- Theophilus I of Jerusalem, ruled in 1012–1020)
- Theophilus II of Jerusalem, Greek Orthodox Patriarch of Jerusalem, ruled 1417–1424
- Abuna Theophilos, second Patriarch of the Ethiopian Orthodox Tewahido Church, ruled in 1971–1976
- Patriarch Theophilos III of Jerusalem, ruled since 2005
