= Theophil Ruderstaller =

Austrian missionary

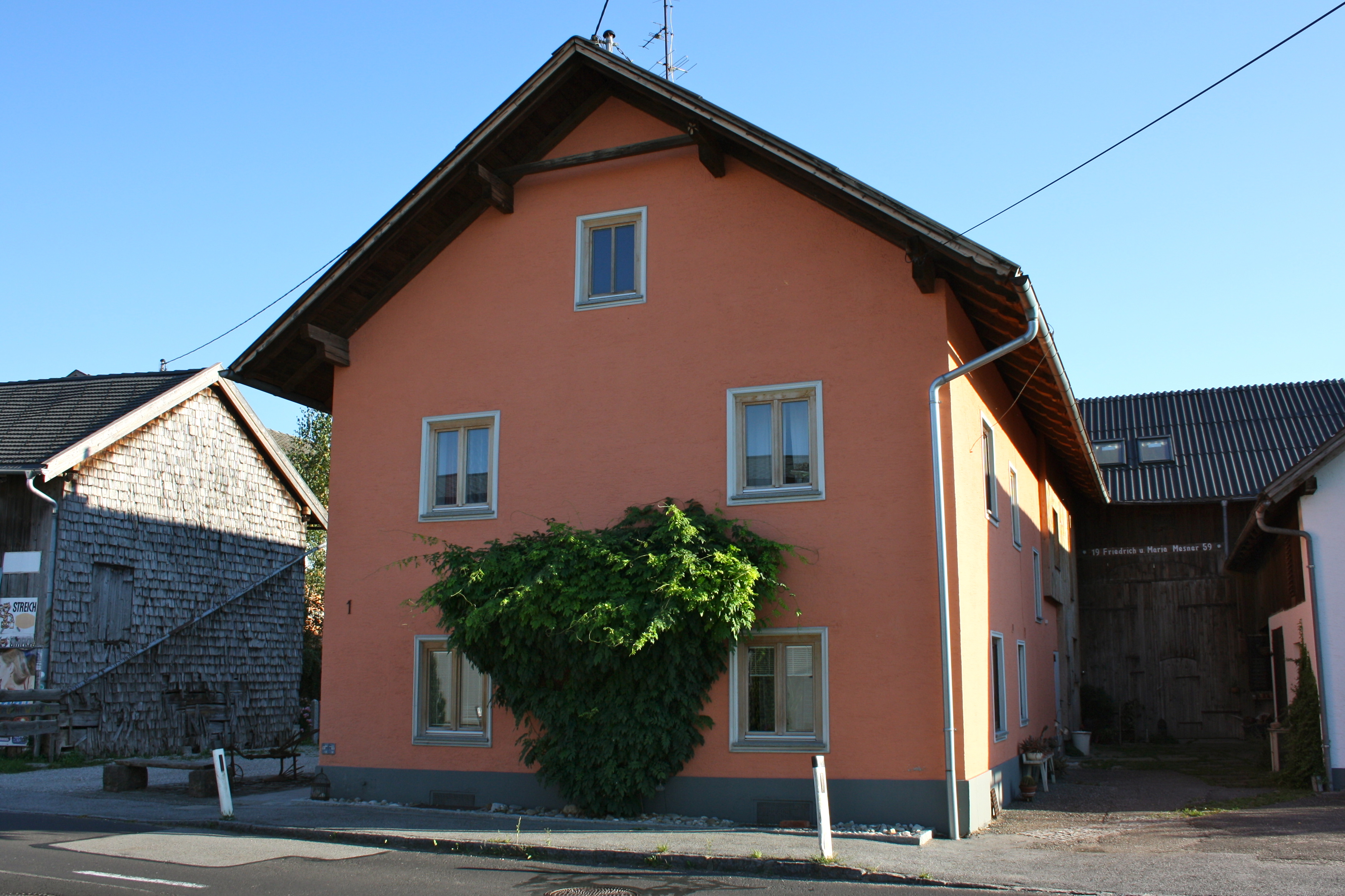
Birthplace of Theophil Ruderstaller

Theophil Ruderstaller (born 1906 in Ostermiething, Upper Austria; died 10 June 1946, in Fuxin, China) was a capuchin and China missionary.

In 2005, Bishop Joseph Wei from Qiqihar - since 2002 apostolic administrator of the former Capuchin mission Kiamusze (Jiamusi) - told Gaudentius Walser from the North Tyrolean Capuchin province that two coffins with the corpses of Theophil Ruderstaller (Ostermiething) and Antonin Schörcksnadel (Innsbruck) had been found while digging a fountain in the garden of a private house. On 10 July 1946 they were shot in the parsonage.

Currently, there is a beatification running for Theophil Ruderstaller.

== Literature ==
- Hermenegild Hintringer: Der oberösterreichische Chinamissionar und Märtyrer P. Theophil Ruderstaller († 1946). In: Neues Archiv für die Geschichte der Diözese Linz Jg. 1 (1981/82), S. 62–75.
- Hermenegild Hintringer: P. Theophil Ruderstaller OFM Cap. von Ostermiething. Ein ehemaliger Petriner und Blutzeuge für die katholische Kirche in China. In: Gedenkschrift zum 50. Schuljahr des Bischöflichen Gymnasiums am Kollegium Petrinum, Linz 1954, S. 82–83.
- Gisela Gensch: 'Lu Shen Fu – der Missionar', Dokumentarischer Roman mit 340 interessanten teilweise historischen Abbildungen, Anmerkungen, Anhang, Originalbriefkopien von Bruder Theophil aus China, Bibliographie; 584 Seiten, 2009, Dr. Bachmaier Verlag München, ISBN 978-3-931680-57-2
