= Laurie N. Gottlieb =

Canadian nursing academic

Laurie N. Gottlieb is a Professor, School of Nursing, McGill University, Montreal, Quebec, Canada, where she holds the Flora Madeline Shaw Chair of Nursing. She is Editor-in-Chief of CJNR (Canadian Journal of Nursing Research) and was recently named Nurse-Scholar-in-Residence at the Jewish General Hospital, a McGill University teaching hospital.

Gottlieb has further developed, researched, lectured, and published extensively on the McGill Model of Nursing. With her husband, Bruce Gottlieb, PhD, a geneticist, they developed the Developmental/Health Framework, an important elaboration of the McGill Model of Nursing. Her books include: Strengths-Based Nursing Care: Health and Healing for Person and Family (in collaboration with Bruce Gottlieb, 2012; Springer Publishing Company), A Perspective on Health, Family, Learning and Collaborative Partnership (co-edited book on the early writings of the McGill Model of Nursing, Gottlieb & Ezer, 1997;McGill University), A Collaborative Partnership Approach to Care (Gottlieb & Feeley with Dalton, 2006; Mosby/Elsevier, with French and Japanese translations), and Dreams Have No Expiry Date: A Practical Way for Women to Take Charge of their Futures (Gottlieb & Rosenswig, 2005; Random House, with Spanish, Dutch, Korean and Portuguese translations). She has also developed the values and principles underlying Strengths-Based Leadership (see below the link) and Strengths-Based Teaching and Learning.

== Awards and honours ==
She is the recipient of prestigious awards including the Centennial Award, the first and one-time only award from the Canadian Nurses Association recognizing the 100 most influential nurses in Canada; and, in 2009, the L'Insigne Du Merit, the highest recognition accorded to a nurse from the Order of Nurses of the Province of Quebec, and the Prix du Conseil Interprofessionnel du Québec (CIQ).
