= David Gottlieb (mathematician) =

Israeli mathematician (1944–2008)

- דוד גוטליב
- Born: 14 November 1944; Tel Aviv, Israel
- Died: 6 December 2008 (aged 64)
- Education: Tel Aviv University
- Known for: numerical analysis
- Scientific career
- Fields: Mathematics
- Workplaces: Tel Aviv University; Brown University
- Doctoral advisor: Saul Abarbanel

David Gottlieb (Hebrew: דוד גוטליב; November 14, 1944 – December 6, 2008) was an Israeli mathematician.

== Biography ==
David Gottlieb was born in Tel Aviv. He received his PhD in 1972 from the Department of Mathematics at Tel Aviv University under the guidance of Saul Abarbanel. He was a professor of applied mathematics at Brown from 1985 until his death.

His research focused on numerical analysis, especially as applied to nonlinear partial differential equations.

He was a member of the National Academy of Sciences and the American Academy of Arts and Sciences.
