= Aargau Monastery Dispute =

1841 dispute over the suppression of monasteries in Aargau, Switzerland

The Aargau Monastery Dispute (German: Aargauer Klosterstreit) was a constitutional and confessional conflict in the Swiss canton of Aargau in 1841, when the Grand Council voted to suppress all eight monasteries in the canton. The dispute became one of the central confessional flashpoints of the Regeneration era and contributed to the tensions that led to the Sonderbund and the civil war of 1847.

== Background ==
In the canton of Aargau during the 1830s, a slim Reformed majority cooperated with influential liberal and radical Catholics. In the spirit of the Helvetic Republic (1798) and the Baden Articles (1834), the Grand Council in 1835 placed the monasteries entirely under state administration, shortly after the government had banned the admission of novices and closed the conventual schools.

The liberal constitution of 1831 required a revision after ten years. Conservative Catholics, organized in the Bünzen Committee of 1839, demanded above all the preservation of confessional parity and that Grand Council commissions on Church and school matters sit separately by confession. The liberal-radical forces, by contrast, sought unification and the full integration of minorities into the state. A first draft constitution was rejected by large majorities in 1840—for different reasons—by both radicals and conservatives. After the Grand Council removed the principle of parity for the legislature, the revised constitution was accepted by 58% of voters on 5 January 1841.

== Suppression of the monasteries ==
To prevent possible unrest, the government had the members of the Bünzen Committee arrested. The conservative Catholics of the Freiamt, further inflamed by the measure, rose in revolt and were defeated by government troops at Villmergen. At the session of the Grand Council on 13 January 1841, the Catholic radical Augustin Keller called in a programmatic speech for the suppression of all monasteries in Aargau, accusing them of hostility to progress and of fomenting unrest. His proposal was carried by 115 votes to 19, with 9 abstentions, and affected eight monasteries, among them Muri, Wettingen, and Fahr. The decision to secularize their property may have appealed to broad sections of the population, but was not the decisive motive for those driving the suppression.

== Federal intervention and resolution ==
The Federal Diet declared the decision incompatible with the Federal Pact of 1815, whose article 12 guaranteed the continued existence of monasteries. After lengthy debates, the Aargau Grand Council agreed to restore the four women's convents, after which the Diet—itself divided along confessional lines—declared the matter settled on 31 August 1843 by twelve full and two half votes.

The confessional tensions that would shortly lead to the Sonderbund were not, however, in any way resolved.

== Bibliography ==
- Geschichte des Kantons Aargau, vol. 2, pp. 79–109.
- Memorial Muri 1841, 1991.
