= Gottlieb Jakob Kuhn =

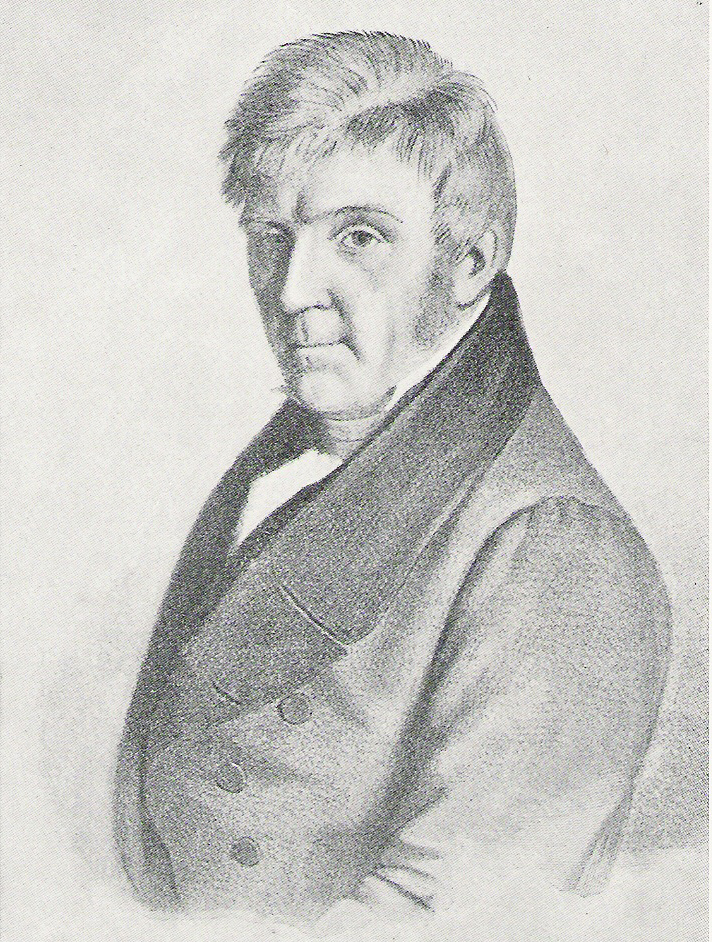

Gottlieb Jakob Kuhn (16 October 1775 – 23 July 1849) was a Bernese pastor, folklorist and poet, known for his dialectal songs. He edited the Bernese Hinkender Bote almanac from 1804 to 1810. In 1811, he co-founded the folkloristic periodical Alpenrosen.
