= 2023–24 DEL2 season =

- League: DEL2
- Sport: Ice Hockey
- Duration: 15 September 2023 – 23 April 2024
- Games: 364 (52 per team)
- Teams: 14
- TV partner(s): Sprade TV eoTV

Regular season
- Season champions: EC Kassel Huskies
- Top scorer: Andrew Yogan (Eisbären Regensburg)
- Promoted to DEL: none
- Relegated to Oberliga: Bietigheim Steelers

Playoffs
- Champions: Eisbären Regensburg
- Runners-up: EC Kassel Huskies

DEL2 seasons
- ← 2022–23 2024–25 →

The 2023–24 DEL2 season was the eleventh season of play for DEL2, the second tier of professional ice hockey in Germany. The regular season ran from 15 September 2023 to 3 March 2024 with EC Kassel Huskies finishing atop the standings. The postseason ran from 6 March 2024 to 23 April 2024 with the Eisbären Regensburg defeating the EC Kassel Huskies 4 games to 2 to win the championship. Despite winning the championship, Regensburg was unable to reach a licensing agreement with the DEL and remained in DEL2. The Bietigheim Steelers were relegated to the Oberliga.

== Membership changes ==
- The Bayreuth Tigers were removed from DEL2 after losing their license with the league. They were replaced by the Bietigheim Steelers, who were relegated from the DEL.
- Heilbronner Falken were relegated to the Oberliga and replaced by Starbulls Rosenheim.

== Teams ==
DEL2 teams for the 2023–24 season.

2023–24 DEL2 teams
Team	City	Arena	Head Coach
Bietigheim Steelers	(Baden-Württemberg) Bietigheim	EgeTrans Arena	(Germany) Alexander Dück
Dresdner Eislöwen	(Saxony) Dresden	EnergieVerbund Arena	(Canada) Corey Neilson
EC Bad Nauheim	(Hesse) Bad Nauheim	Colonel-Knight-Stadion	(Austria) Harry Lange
EC Kassel Huskies	(Hesse) Kassel	Eissporthalle Kassel	(Czech Republic) Bill Stewart
EHC Freiburg	(Baden-Württemberg) Freiburg	Franz Siegel Stadion	(Finland) Timo Saarikoski
Eisbären Regensburg	(Bavaria) Regensburg	Donau Arena	(Germany) Maximilian Kaltenhauser
Eispiraten Crimmitschau	(Saxony) Crimmitschau	Eisstadion im Sahnpark	(Finland) Jussi Tuores
ESV Kaufbeuren	(Bavaria) Kaufbeuren	Erdgas Schwaben Arena	(Czech Republic) Daniel Jun
EV Landshut	(Bavaria) Landshut	Eisstadion am Gutenbergweg	(Germany) Heiko Vogler
Krefeld Pinguine	(North Rhine-Westphalia) Krefeld	Yayla Arena	(Germany) Boris Blank
Lausitzer Füchse	(Saxony) Weißwasser	Eisstadion Weißwasser	(Finland) Petteri Väkiparta
Ravensburg Towerstars	(Baden-Württemberg) Ravensburg	Eissporthalle Ravensburg	(Hungary) Gergely Majoross
Selber Wölfe	(Bavaria) Selb	Hutschenreuther Eissporthalle	(Canada) Ryan Foster
Starbulls Rosenheim	(Bavaria) Rosenheim	Rofa-Stadion	(Finland) Jari Pasanen

== Regular season ==
Pos	Team	Pld	W	OTW	OTL	L	GF	GA	GD	Pts	Qualification or relegation
1	EC Kassel Huskies	52	29	5	3	15	177	129	+48	100	Championship Playoffs
2	Eisbären Regensburg	52	27	5	2	18	171	146	+25	93	Championship Playoffs
3	Eispiraten Crimmitschau	52	23	5	8	16	158	145	+13	87	Championship Playoffs
4	EV Landshut	52	21	8	6	17	149	131	+18	85	Championship Playoffs
5	ESV Kaufbeuren	52	20	5	10	17	165	153	+12	80	Championship Playoffs
6	Krefeld Pinguine	52	22	4	6	20	140	140	0	80	Championship Playoffs
7	Ravensburg Towerstars	52	21	4	7	20	148	143	+5	78	Championship Pre-playoffs
8	Lausitzer Füchse	52	19	6	8	19	126	123	+3	77	Championship Pre-playoffs
9	EC Bad Nauheim	52	18	9	3	22	172	176	−4	75	Championship Pre-playoffs
10	EHC Freiburg	52	18	7	6	21	160	168	−8	74	Championship Pre-playoffs
11	Starbulls Rosenheim	52	17	8	6	21	153	174	−21	73	Relegation Playdowns
12	Selber Wölfe	52	18	5	7	22	145	166	−21	71	Relegation Playdowns
13	Dresdner Eislöwen	52	18	5	4	25	144	158	−14	68	Relegation Playdowns
14	Bietigheim Steelers	52	12	5	5	30	145	201	−56	51	Relegation Playdowns

Source: www.kicker.de www.del-2.org
Rules for classification:
Tie-break: 1) points; 2) goal difference; 3) number of goals scored
Points: 3 points for regulation win; 2 points for OT or SO win; 1 point for OT or SO loss; 0 points for regulation loss

== Statistics ==
=== Scoring leaders ===
List shows the top skaters sorted by points, then goals.

Player	Team	POS	GP	G	A	PTS	PIM
Andrew Yogan	Eisbären Regensburg	C/LW	48	35	45	80	45
Abbott Girduckis	Eisbären Regensburg	C/RW	52	22	49	71	12
Corey Trivino	Eisbären Regensburg	C	51	35	35	70	12
Tim Coffman	EC Bad Nauheim	C/RW	52	25	33	58	22
Parker Bowles	EHC Freiburg	C/LW	50	31	25	56	20
Tobias Lindberg	Eispiraten Crimmitschau	C	51	23	31	54	54
C. J. Stretch	Starbulls Rosenheim	C	50	14	37	51	79
Charlie Sarault	Ravensburg Towerstars	C	52	13	38	51	6
Tomas Andres	Dresdner Eislöwen	C	51	15	34	49	31
Yannik Valenti	EC Kassel Huskies	RW	49	27	21	48	24
Jack Doremus	Bietigheim Steelers	C/W	48	25	23	48	34

=== Leading goaltenders ===
Only the top five goaltenders, based on save percentage, who have played at least 1/3 of their team's minutes, are included in this list.

Player	Team	GP	TOI	W	L	GA	SA	SO	GAA	SV%
Jonas Langmann	EV Landshut	37	2140	20	15	83	919	3	2.33	.917
Brandon Maxwell	EC Kassel Huskies	31	1822	20	10	71	711	1	2.34	.909
Oleg Shilin	Eispiraten Crimmitschau	30	1738	16	13	68	863	2	2.35	.927
Patrik Cerveny	EHC Freiburg	18	1088	13	5	43	507	0	2.37	.922
Felix Bick	Krefeld Pinguine	43	2556	22	21	102	1347	3	2.40	.930

== Playoffs ==
=== Championship ===
Pre-playoffs (best-of-3)
7	Ravensburg Towerstars	6	4	-
10	EHC Freiburg	1	1	-
8	Lausitzer Füchse	2*	3*	-
9	EC Bad Nauheim	1	2	-

Quarterfinals (best-of-7)
1	EC Kassel Huskies	5	3	4	5	3	2	4
8	Lausitzer Füchse	1	4	2	1	6	4	1
2	Eisbären Regensburg	2	5	2	0	4	2*	4
7	Ravensburg Towerstars	3*	1	4	4	1	1	3
3	Eispiraten Crimmitschau	3	5	4	1	0	3	6*
6	Krefeld Pinguine	0	3	2	3	2	4	5
4	EV Landshut	4	2	4	2	3	2	3
5	ESV Kaufbeuren	1	5	6	1	0	5	4*

Semifinals (best-of-7)
1	EC Kassel Huskies	5	5*	2	4	2	-	-
5	ESV Kaufbeuren	1	4	3*	1	1	-	-
(Pairings are re-seeded after the first and second round)
2	Eisbären Regensburg	5	1	8	5	2	6	-
3	Eispiraten Crimmitschau	3	6	4	2	3	2	-

Championship (best-of-7)
1	EC Kassel Huskies	2*	1	3	2	2	2	-
2	Eisbären Regensburg	1	5	1	4	5	4	-

=== Relegation ===
Semifinals (best-of-7)
11	Starbulls Rosenheim	4
14	Bietigheim Steelers	1
12	Selber Wölfe	2
13	Dresdner Eislöwen	4

Finals (best-of-7)
14	Bietigheim Steelers	1
12	Selber Wölfe	4
