= 2021–22 DEL2 season =

- League: DEL2
- Sport: Ice Hockey
- Duration: 1 October 2021 – April 2022
- Games: 364 (52 per team)
- Teams: 14
- TV partner(s): Sprade TV eoTV

Regular season
- Season champions: Löwen Frankfurt
- Top scorer: Peter Quenneville (Lausitzer Füchse)
- Promoted to DEL: Löwen Frankfurt
- Relegated to Oberliga: Tölzer Löwen

Playoffs
- Champions: Löwen Frankfurt

DEL2 seasons
- ← 2020–21 2022–23 →

The 2021–22 DEL2 season was the ninth season since the founding of the DEL2, the second tier of German ice hockey, set below the Deutsche Eishockey Liga (DEL).

== Teams ==
DEL2 teams for the 2021–22 season.

14 teams took part in the league. The Selber Wölfe were promoted from the big Oberliga. 2020-2021 DEL2 Champions Bietigheim Steelers had been promoted to the DEL.

2021–22 DEL2 teams
Team	City	Arena	Head Coach	Captain
EC Bad Nauheim	(Hesse) Bad Nauheim	Colonel-Knight-Stadion	(Austria) Harry Lange	(Germany) Marc El-Sayed
Tölzer Löwen	(Bavaria) Bad Tölz	Hacker-Pschorr-Arena	(Canada) Kevin Gaudet	(Germany) Philipp Schlager
Bayreuth Tigers	(Bavaria) Bayreuth	Kunsteisstadion	(Germany) Michael Schwellengreber	(Slovakia) Ivan Kolozvary
Selber Wölfe	(Bavaria) Selb	Hutschenreuther Eissporthalle	(Germany) Herbert Hohenberger	(Germany) Florian Ondruschka
Eispiraten Crimmitschau	(Saxony) Crimmitschau	Eisstadion im Sahnpark	(Germany) Marian Bazany	(Germany) Vincent Schlenker
Dresdner Eislöwen	(Saxony) Dresden	EnergieVerbund Arena	(Germany) Andreas Brockmann	(Canada) Jordan Knackstedt
Löwen Frankfurt	(Hesse) Frankfurt	Eissporthalle Frankfurt	(Czech Republic) Bohuslav Subr	(Germany) Maximilian Faber
EHC Freiburg	(Baden-Württemberg) Freiburg	Franz Siegel Stadion	(Germany) Robert Hoffmann	(Germany) Simon Danner
Heilbronner Falken	(Baden-Württemberg) Heilbronn	Kolbenschmidt Arena	(Canada) Jason Morgan	(Germany) Christopher Fischer
EC Kassel Huskies	(Hesse) Kassel	Eissporthalle Kassel	(Canada) Tim Kehler	(Germany) Denis Shevyrin
ESV Kaufbeuren	(Bavaria) Kaufbeuren	Erdgas Schwaben Arena	(United States) Tray Tuomie	(Canada) Tyler Spurgeon
EV Landshut	(Bavaria) Landshut	Eisstadion am Gutenbergweg	(Sweden) Leif Carlsson	(Germany) Stephan Kronthaler
Lausitzer Füchse	(Saxony) Weißwasser	Eisstadion Weißwasser	(Canada) Chris Straube	(Canada) Clarke Breitkreuz
Ravensburg Towerstars	(Baden-Württemberg) Ravensburg	Eissporthalle Ravensburg	(Scotland) Peter Russell	(Germany) Vincenz Mayer

== Regular season ==
Pos	Team	Pld	W	OTW	OTL	L	GF	GA	GD	Pts	Qualification or relegation
1	Löwen Frankfurt	52	33	5	3	11	209	116	+93	112	Championship Playoffs
2	Dresdner Eislöwen	52	32	4	6	10	195	123	+72	110	Championship Playoffs
3	Ravensburg Towerstars	51	30	7	3	11	195	123	+72	107	Championship Playoffs
4	EC Bad Nauheim	52	25	6	6	15	155	140	+15	93	Championship Playoffs
5	EC Kassel Huskies	50	28	2	2	18	163	154	+9	90	Championship Playoffs
6	Heilbronner Falken	52	20	7	6	19	180	164	+16	80	Championship Playoffs
7	Eispiraten Crimmitschau	49	19	9	3	18	128	127	+1	78	Championship Pre-playoffs
8	Wölfe Freiburg	52	20	4	5	23	164	182	−18	73	Championship Pre-playoffs
9	ESV Kaufbeuren	52	19	4	8	21	182	173	+9	73	Championship Pre-playoffs
10	EV Landshut	52	17	6	5	24	167	173	−6	68	Championship Pre-playoffs
11	Bayreuth Tigers	52	17	1	6	28	165	203	−38	59	Relegation Playdowns
12	Lausitzer Füchse	52	13	6	3	30	147	172	−25	54	Relegation Playdowns
13	Tölzer Löwen	50	16	1	4	29	149	214	−65	54	Relegation Playdowns
14	Selber Wölfe	52	9	0	2	41	97	232	−135	29	Relegation Playdowns

Source: www.kicker.de www.del-2.org
Rules for classification:
Tie-break: 1) points; 2) goal difference; 3) number of goals scored
Points: 3 points for regulation win; 2 points for OT or SO win; 1 point for OT or SO loss; 0 points for regulation loss

== Playoffs ==
=== Championship ===
Pre-playoffs (best-of-3)
7	Heilbronner Falken	2
10	EV Landshut	1
8	ESV Kaufbeuren	0
9	Wölfe Freiburg	2

Quarter-finals (best-of-7)
1	Löwen Frankfurt	4
9	Wölfe Freiburg	0
2	Dresdner Eislöwen	2
7	Heilbronner Falken	4
3	Ravensburg Towerstars	4
6	Eispiraten Crimmitschau	0
4	EC Kassel Huskies	3
5	EC Bad Nauheim	4

Semi-finals (best-of-7)
1	Löwen Frankfurt	4
7	Heilbronner Falken	0
(Pairings are re-seeded after the first and second round)
3	Ravensburg Towerstars	4
5	EC Bad Nauheim	1

Finals (best-of-7)
1	Löwen Frankfurt	4
3	Ravensburg Towerstars	0

=== Relegation ===
Semi-finals (best-of-7)
11	Bayreuth Tigers	2
14	Selber Wölfe	4
12	Tölzer Löwen	1
13	Lausitzer Füchse	4

Finals (best-of-7)
11	Bayreuth Tigers	4
12	Tölzer Löwen	2
