= 2022–23 DEL2 season =

- League: DEL2
- Sport: Ice Hockey
- Duration: 16 September 2022 – 25 April 2023
- Games: 364 (52 per team)
- Teams: 14
- TV partner(s): Sprade TV eoTV

Regular season
- Season champions: EC Kassel Huskies
- Top scorer: Marcel Müller (Krefeld Pinguine)
- Promoted to DEL: none
- Relegated to Oberliga: Heilbronner Falken

Playoffs
- Champions: Ravensburg Towerstars
- Runners-up: EC Bad Nauheim

DEL2 seasons
- ← 2021–22 2023–24 →

The 2022–23 DEL2 season was the tenth season of play for DEL2, the second tier of professional ice hockey in Germany. The Regular season ran from 16 September 2022 to 5 March 2023 with EC Kassel Huskies finishing atop the standings. The postseason ran from 8 March 2023 to 25 April 2023 with the Ravensburg Towerstars defeating the EC Bad Nauheim 4 games to 1 to win the championship. Despite winning the championship, Ravensburg was unable to reach a licensing agreement with the DEL and remained in DEL2. The Heilbronner Falken were relegated to the Oberliga. Despite saving themselves in relegation, the Bayreuth Tigers were removed from the league due to losing their license with DEL2 after the season.

== Membership changes ==
- Löwen Frankfurt was promoted to the Deutsche Eishockey Liga and replaced by the Krefeld Pinguine.
- Tölzer Löwen were relegated to the Oberliga and replaced by Eisbären Regensburg.

== Teams ==
DEL2 teams for the 2022–23 season.

2022–23 DEL2 teams
Team	City	Arena	Head Coach
Bayreuth Tigers	(Bavaria) Bayreuth	Kunsteisstadion	(Canada) Rich Chernomaz
Dresdner Eislöwen	(Saxony) Dresden	EnergieVerbund Arena	(Germany) Andreas Brockmann
EC Bad Nauheim	(Hesse) Bad Nauheim	Colonel-Knight-Stadion	(Austria) Harry Lange
EC Kassel Huskies	(Hesse) Kassel	Eissporthalle Kassel	(Czech Republic) Bohuslav Subr
EHC Freiburg	(Baden-Württemberg) Freiburg	Franz Siegel Stadion	(Germany) Robert Hoffmann
Eisbären Regensburg	(Bavaria) Regensburg	Donau Arena	(Germany) Maximilian Kaltenhauser
Eispiraten Crimmitschau	(Saxony) Crimmitschau	Eisstadion im Sahnpark	(Germany) Marian Bazany
ESV Kaufbeuren	(Bavaria) Kaufbeuren	Erdgas Schwaben Arena	(Finland) Marko Raita
EV Landshut	(Bavaria) Landshut	Eisstadion am Gutenbergweg	(Germany) Heiko Vogler
Heilbronner Falken	(Baden-Württemberg) Heilbronn	Kolbenschmidt Arena	(Canada) Martin Jiranek
Krefeld Pinguine	(North Rhine-Westphalia) Krefeld	Yayla Arena	(Germany) Boris Blank
Lausitzer Füchse	(Saxony) Weißwasser	Eisstadion Weißwasser	(Finland) Petteri Väkiparta
Ravensburg Towerstars	(Baden-Württemberg) Ravensburg	Eissporthalle Ravensburg	(Canada) Tim Kehler
Selber Wölfe	(Bavaria) Selb	Hutschenreuther Eissporthalle	(Germany) Sergej Waßmiller

== Regular season ==
Pos	Team	Pld	W	OTW	OTL	L	GF	GA	GD	Pts	Qualification or relegation
1	EC Kassel Huskies	52	40	4	3	5	212	109	+103	131	Championship Playoffs
2	Ravensburg Towerstars	52	27	3	6	16	169	146	+23	93	Championship Playoffs
3	ESV Kaufbeuren	52	25	4	7	16	165	125	+40	90	Championship Playoffs
4	Krefeld Pinguine	52	23	6	7	16	167	145	+22	88	Championship Playoffs
5	Dresdner Eislöwen	52	21	9	6	16	156	130	+26	87	Championship Playoffs
6	EC Bad Nauheim	52	23	5	3	21	168	167	+1	82	Championship Playoffs
7	EV Landshut	52	20	5	7	20	164	172	−8	77	Championship Pre-playoffs
8	EHC Freiburg	52	21	3	4	24	158	176	−18	73	Championship Pre-playoffs
9	Lausitzer Füchse	52	17	7	7	21	131	147	−16	72	Championship Pre-playoffs
10	Eisbären Regensburg	52	17	6	5	24	149	168	−19	68	Championship Pre-playoffs
11	Eispiraten Crimmitschau	52	17	4	8	23	136	155	−19	67	Relegation Playdowns
12	Heilbronner Falken	52	14	8	6	24	160	179	−19	64	Relegation Playdowns
13	Selber Wölfe	52	13	10	3	26	145	180	−35	62	Relegation Playdowns
14	Bayreuth Tigers	52	8	4	6	34	125	206	−81	38	Relegation Playdowns

Source: www.kicker.de www.del-2.org
Rules for classification:
Tie-break: 1) points; 2) goal difference; 3) number of goals scored
Points: 3 points for regulation win; 2 points for OT or SO win; 1 point for OT or SO loss; 0 points for regulation loss

== Statistics ==
=== Scoring leaders ===
List shows the top skaters sorted by points, then goals.

Player	Team	POS	GP	G	A	PTS	PIM
Marcel Müller	Krefeld Pinguine	C/LW	50	24	46	70	26
Hunter Garlent	Lausitzer Füchse	C	52	28	35	63	24
Tor Immo	EHC Freiburg	LW/RW	47	26	35	61	32
Alex Tonge	Heilbronner Falken	C/LW	52	19	40	59	16
Jacob Lagacé	ESV Kaufbeuren	C/RW	46	17	38	55	31
Ville Järveläinen	Bayreuth Tigers	RW	49	23	31	54	14
Tim Coffman	EC Bad Nauheim	C/RW	52	22	31	53	18
Zach Magwood	Krefeld Pinguine	C/RW	50	26	26	52	33
Corey Trivino	Eisbären Regensburg	C	47	25	26	51	2
Marco Pfleger	EV Landshut	RW	50	23	28	51	22

=== Leading goaltenders ===
Only the top five goaltenders, based on save percentage, who have played at least 1/3 of their team's minutes, are included in this list.

Player	Team	GP	TOI	W	L	GA	SA	SO	GAA	SV%
Jake Kielly	EC Kassel Huskies	23	1400	22	1	46	579	1	1.97	.926
Jerry Kuhn	EC Kassel Huskies	29	1732	22	7	61	714	2	2.11	.921
Daniel Fießinger	ESV Kaufbeuren	40	2369	24	16	85	944	0	2.15	.917
Janick Schwendener	Dresdner Eislöwen	41	2432	26	15	88	937	5	2.17	.914
Ville Kolppanen	Lausitzer Füchse	25	1527	12	13	62	780	0	2.44	.926

== Playoffs ==
=== Championship ===
Pre-playoffs (best-of-3)
7	EV Landshut	5	3	-
10	Eisbären Regensburg	1	2	-
8	EHC Freiburg	6	1	3
9	Lausitzer Füchse	1	5	6

Quarterfinals (best-of-7)
1	EC Kassel Huskies	4	2	4	4	-	-	-
9	Lausitzer Füchse	1	1	1	1	-	-	-
2	Ravensburg Towerstars	4	4	2	2	6*	2	5
7	EV Landshut	1	2	4	3*	5	5	0
3	ESV Kaufbeuren	2	3	3	1	-	-	-
6	EC Bad Nauheim	4	5	4	5	-	-	-
4	Krefeld Pinguine	4	6	3*	1	2	2	4
5	Dresdner Eislöwen	2	3	2	2	3*	6	2

Semifinals (best-of-7)
1	EC Kassel Huskies	6	1	3	0	2	2	-
6	EC Bad Nauheim	3	4	4	1	1	8	-
(Pairings are re-seeded after the first and second round)
2	Ravensburg Towerstars	5	2	1	5	5	-	-
4	Krefeld Pinguine	4	0	3	4	4	-	-

Championship (best-of-7)
6	EC Bad Nauheim	2	3	2	1	3	-	-
2	Ravensburg Towerstars	4	0	5	3	7	-	-

=== Relegation ===
Semifinals (best-of-7)
11	Eispiraten Crimmitschau	3	4	1	2	3	5	-
14	Bayreuth Tigers	0	0	3	5	2	2	-
12	Heilbronner Falken	1	5	3	3	2	1	-
13	Selber Wölfe	2	8	2	2	3	5	-

Finals (best-of-7)
14	Bayreuth Tigers	2	3	1	3	4	5	-
12	Heilbronner Falken	4	2	4	2	2	0	-
