= 2020–21 DEL2 season =

- League: DEL2
- Sport: Ice Hockey
- Duration: 6 November 2020 – 22 May 2021
- Games: 364 (52 per team)
- Teams: 14
- TV partner(s): Sprade TV eoTV

Regular season
- Season champions: EC Kassel Huskies
- Top scorer: Marco Pfleger (Tölzen Löwen)
- Relegated to Oberliga: No relegation (relegation suspended for season)

Playoffs
- Champions: Bietigheim Steelers
- Finals MVP: Norman Hauner (Steelers)

DEL2 seasons
- ← 2019–20 2021–22 →

The 2020–21 DEL2 season was the eighth season since the founding of the DEL2, the second tier of German ice hockey, set below the Deutsche Eishockey Liga (DEL). The season began on a delayed start date of 6 November 2020 after being rescheduled from 2 October 2020, and concluded with the end of the playoffs on 22 May 2021. Due to the ongoing COVID-19 pandemic, DEL2 along with DEL and DEB agreed to a set of health rules and guidelines to ensure a safe and consistent work environment for everyone involved with hockey in Germany. Fans were excluded from attending matches. The DEL2 board agreed to suspend relegation to the Oberliga for the season, resulting in no relegation play-offs being contested. The season also marked the first time the league implemented promotion to DEL.

== Teams ==
DEL2 teams for the 2020–21 season.

In 2020–21 the DEL2 had 14 teams competing in the league.

2020–21 DEL2 teams
Team	City	Arena	Head coach	Captain
EC Bad Nauheim	(Hesse) Bad Nauheim	Colonel-Knight-Stadion	(Finland) Hannu Järvenpää	(Germany) Marc El-Sayed
Tölzer Löwen	(Bavaria) Bad Tölz	Hacker-Pschorr-Arena	(Canada) Kevin Gaudet	(Germany) Philipp Schlager
Bayreuth Tigers	(Bavaria) Bayreuth	Kunsteisstadion	(Finland) Petri Kujala	(Slovakia) Ivan Kolozvary
Bietigheim Steelers	(Baden-Württemberg) Bietigheim-Bissingen	EgeTrans Arena	(Canada) Daniel Naud	(Germany) Nikolai Goc
Eispiraten Crimmitschau	(Saxony) Crimmitschau	Eisstadion im Sahnpark	(Canada) Mario Richer	(Germany) Adrian Grygiel
Dresdner Eislöwen	(Saxony) Dresden	EnergieVerbund Arena	(Germany) Andreas Brockmann	(Germany) Thomas Pielmeier
Löwen Frankfurt	(Hesse) Frankfurt	Eissporthalle Frankfurt	(Germany) Franz-David Fritzmeier	(Canada) Adam Mitchell
EHC Freiburg	(Baden-Württemberg) Freiburg	Franz Siegel Stadion	(Scotland) Peter Russell	(Germany) Philipp Rießle
Heilbronner Falken	(Baden-Württemberg) Heilbronn	Kolbenschmidt Arena	(Canada) Bill Stewart	(United States) Derek Damon
EC Kassel Huskies	(Hesse) Kassel	Eissporthalle Kassel	(Canada) Tim Kehler	(Germany) Denis Shevyrin
ESV Kaufbeuren	(Bavaria) Kaufbeuren	Erdgas Schwaben Arena	(United States) Rob Pallin	(Canada) Tyler Spurgeon
EV Landshut	(Bavaria) Landshut	Eisstadion am Gutenbergweg	(Sweden) Leif Carlsson	(Germany) Tim Brunnhuber
Lausitzer Füchse	(Saxony) Weißwasser	Eisstadion Weißwasser	(Canada) Corey Neilson	(Canada) Clarke Breitkreuz
Ravensburg Towerstars	(Baden-Württemberg) Ravensburg	Eissporthalle Ravensburg	(Canada) Rich Chernomaz	(Germany) Vincenz Mayer

== Format ==
Fourteen teams competed in the 2019–20 DEL2 regular season that ran from 6 November 2020 to 11 April 2021. No team was promoted or relegated to Oberliga. Each team played each other twice in the regular season, home and away, for a total of 52 matches each. The top eight teams qualified for the championship playoffs, played in a best of five format.

For the first time in DEL2 history, sporting promotion to DEL was introduced. Relegation from DEL to DEL2 was suspended for the season. Financial account examination was an additional requirement for the DEL2 champion to obtrain a DEL licence to secure promotion. Löwen Frankfurt, EC Kassel Huskies and Bietigheim Steelers all applied for their financial accounts to be examined.

== Regular season ==
=== Results ===
Home \ Away	BN	TL	BT	BS	EC	DE	LF	EF	HF	KH	EK	EL	FU	RT	BN	TL	BT	BS	EC	DE	LF	EF	HF	KH	EK	EL	FU	RT
EC Bad Nauheim		–	4–1	6–3	3–7	3–2	6–2	–	7–1	0–8	–	4–3	4–2	6–0		–	4–1	2–6	–	–	–	–	–	–	–	–	–	–
Tölzer Löwen	7–2		4–2	2–3 (Note: Overtime)	8–1	3–4	–	4–2	6–3	4–5	–	5–2	7–1	3–6	–		–	5–2	–	–	–	–	–	–	–	–	–	1–4
Bayreuth Tigers	7–2	2–1		2–5	1–4	4–1	–	3–4	3–1	3–4 (Note: Shootout)	4–3	4–7	2–3	3–1	–	0–5		–	6–7	–	–	–	–	–	–	–	–	–
Bietigheim Steelers	1–0	8–7	3–7		4–2	–	7–2	3–4	4–1	5–4	7–2	9–4	3–5	3–8	–	–	–		–	4–1	–	1–2	–	–	6–4	–	–	–
Eispiraten Crimmitschau	5–1	4–5	2–4	0–3		2–1	–	5–3	3–4	3–2	7–6	6–7	3–2	4–1	–	–	–	–		2–4	–	–	–	–	–	4–2	–	–
Dresdner Eislöwen	2–3	0–1	3–0	3–2	3–2		3–2	1–5	4–2	3–4	2–6	5–2	5–4	0–3	–	–	–	–	–		2–10	–	–	–	–	–	1–0	–
Löwen Frankfurt	5–1	1–4	5–3	–	2–0	–		5–4	2–3	4–3	5–3	2–1	6–1	5–2	–	–	–	–	–	–		–	2–1	2–1	–	–	–	–
EHC Freiburg	8–1	4–3	4–2	2–5	3–4	5–4	2–3		5–2	0–3	4–3	7–3	6–1	2–3	–	–	–	–	–	–	–		3–4	–	–	–	–	3–2
Heilbronner Falken	–	3–6	–	6–2	5–2	2–5	1–3	4–7		–	3–6	8–4	4–1	7–0	–	2–4	–	–	–	–	–	–		–	1–3	–	–	–
EC Kassel Huskies	3–4	5–3	6–2	3–1	4–5	4–1	7–0	1–0	4–3		5–0	3–1	5–1	4–2	4–1	–	–	–	–	–	–	5–1	–		–	–	–	–
ESV Kaufbeuren	3–2	2–6	5–7	3–2	3–2	8–1	5–4	5–0 (Note: Match forfeited by Freiburg retrospectively for not icing enough U21 players. ESV Kaufbeuren handed a 5-0 victory despite the match finishing 6-2 on the night.)	4–2	1–4		5–6	–	1–4	–	–	–	–	–	1–4	–	–	–	–		3–2	–	–
EV Landshut	3–2	3–2	5–3	1–2	3–4	5–2	4–2	4–2	–	–	2–3		4–2	2–3	–	–	–	–	–	–	3–1	–	–	–	–		3–4	–
Lausitzer Füchse	7–3	3–2	2–3	6–0	3–4	3–2	2–1	–	4–5	4–3	0–1	1–3		1–3	–	–	1–3	–	–	–	–	–	–	2–3	–	–		–
Ravensburg Towerstars	7–1	2–3	3–2	4–1	4–1	6–3	1–2	3–4	–	2–4	7–5	4–2	3–5		2–4	–	–	–	2–3	–	–	–	–	–	–	–	–	

Updated to match(es) played on 9 February 2021. Source: DEL2
Legend: Blue = home team win; Yellow = draw; Red = away team win.

=== Standings ===
Pos	Team	Pld	W	OTW	OTL	L	GF	GA	GD	Pts	Qualification or relegation
1	EC Kassel Huskies	49	32	6	4	7	210	108	+102	112	2021 DEL2 Championship Playoffs
2	Tölzer Löwen	50	28	1	6	15	210	153	+57	92	2021 DEL2 Championship Playoffs
3	EHC Freiburg	49	23	8	4	14	177	149	+28	89	2021 DEL2 Championship Playoffs
4	Bietigheim Steelers	49	26	4	3	16	183	165	+18	89	2021 DEL2 Championship Playoffs
5	Löwen Frankfurt	49	22	8	5	14	158	141	+17	87	2021 DEL2 Championship Playoffs
6	ESV Kaufbeuren	50	22	6	2	20	181	187	−6	80	2021 DEL2 Championship Playoffs
7	Ravensburg Towerstars	50	20	2	8	20	155	161	−6	72	2021 DEL2 Championship Playoffs
8	Heilbronner Falken	49	20	3	2	24	173	175	−2	68	2021 DEL2 Championship Playoffs
9	Eispiraten Crimmitschau	49	17	6	3	23	156	166	−10	66	
10	EV Landshut	50	15	4	7	24	162	191	−29	60	
11	EC Bad Nauheim	49	16	4	4	25	156	187	−31	60	
12	Lausitzer Füchse	50	15	3	7	25	141	175	−34	58	
13	Dresdner Eislöwen	49	12	7	6	24	140	184	−44	56	
14	Bayreuth Tigers	50	12	4	5	29	145	205	−60	49	

Updated to match(es) played on 8 April 2021. Source: www.kicker.de www.del-2.org
Rules for classification:
Tie-break: 1) points; 2) goal difference; 3) number of goals scored
Points: 3 points for regulation win; 2 points for OT or SO win; 1 point for OT or SO loss; 0 points for regulation loss

=== Top scorers ===
These are the top-ten scorers in DEL2 for the 2020–21 season. (Table is created at the conclusion of the DEL2 regular season)

=== Top goaltenders ===
These are the top-ten goaltenders in DEL2 for the 2020–21 season. (Table is created at the conclusion of the DEL2 regular season)

== Playoffs ==
Due to the ongoing coronavirus situation, the relegation play-offs were suspended for the season. The championship play-offs saw the DEL2 champion qualify for promotion to DEL for the first time, as long as the winning team also met financial requirements to obtain a DEL licence.

=== Championship ===
The championship playoffs reference:

The championship playoffs ran from 22 April 2021 to 22 May 2021. The top eight teams from the regular season qualified and played best-of-five series. Teams were reseeded following the quarter-finals, which meant that Ravensburg, the only lower seed to advance, had to face top seed Kassel in the semi-finals. In the finals, Bietigheim came back from two games down to win the series and the DEL2 championship, 3 games to 2.

Quarterfinals
1	EC Kassel Huskies	3
8	Heilbronner Falken	0
2	Tölzer Löwen	1
7	Ravensburg Towerstars	3
(Pairings are reseeded after the first round)
3	EHC Freiburg	3
6	ESV Kaufbeuren	2
4	Bietigheim Steelers	3
5	Löwen Frankfurt	2

Semifinals
1	EC Kassel Huskies	3
7	Ravensburg Towerstars	1
3	EHC Freiburg	2
4	Bietigheim Steelers	3

Finals
1	EC Kassel Huskies	2
4	Bietigheim Steelers	3

Note: All numbers represent series results, not a match score
