= Jordan Knackstedt =

Canadian ice hockey player

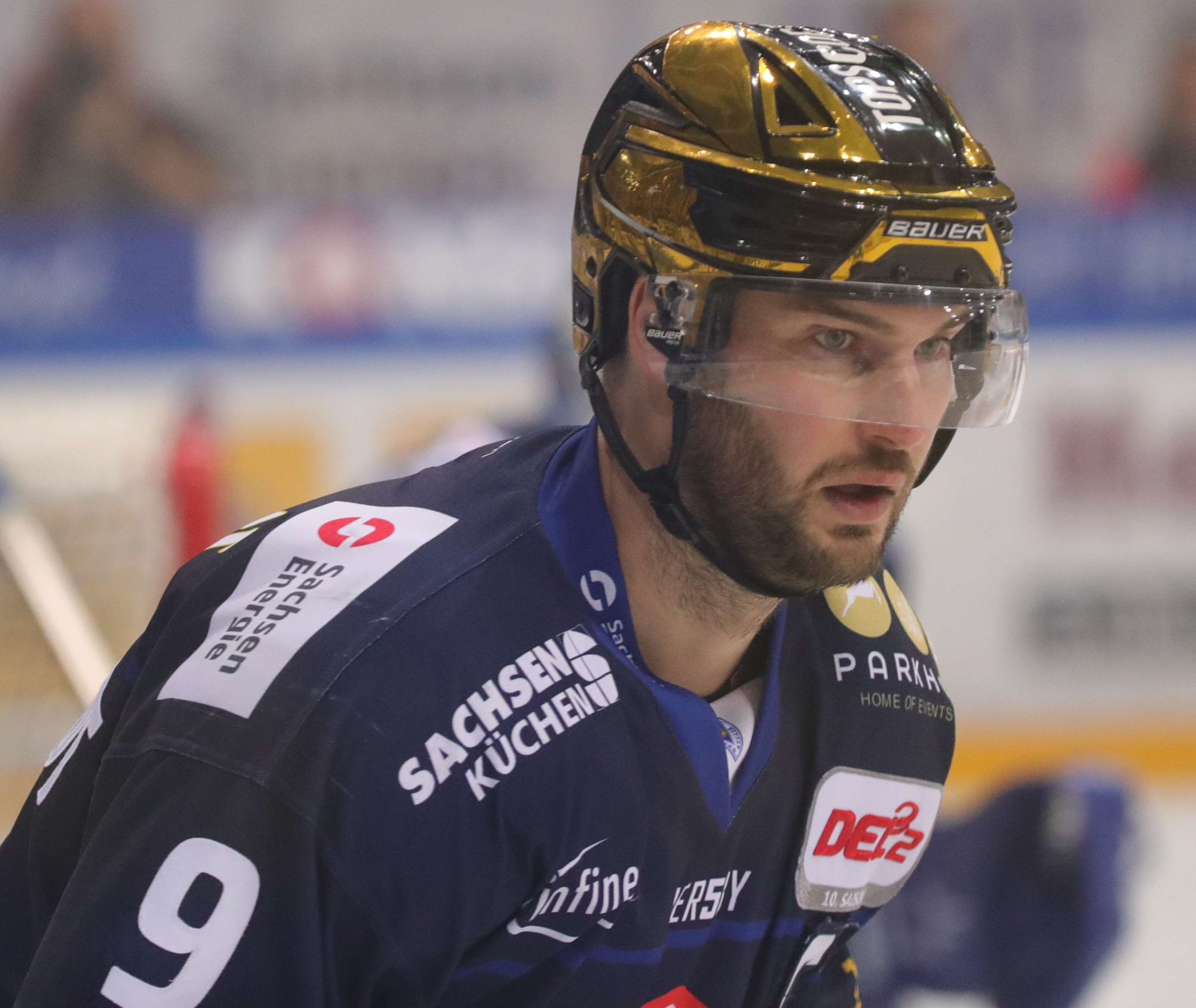
- Knackstedt in 2023
- Born: September 28, 1988 (age 37) Saskatoon, Saskatchewan, Canada
- Height: 6 ft 2 in (188 cm)
- Weight: 195 lb (88 kg; 13 st 13 lb)
- Position: Right wing
- Shoots: Right
- Oberliga team Former teams: Hannover Scorpions; Providence Bruins; Rochester Americans; HC Bolzano; Tingsryds AIF; Milano Rossoblu; Abbotsford Heat; Rubin Tyumen; Saryarka Karaganda; ESV Kaufbeuren; Herlev Eagles; Esbjerg Energy; Eispiraten Crimmitschau; Dresdner Eislöwen; Selber Wölfe
- NHL draft: 189th overall, 2007; Boston Bruins
- Playing career: 2008–present

Jordan Knackstedt (born September 28, 1988) is a Canadian professional ice hockey winger currently playing for Hannover Scorpions of the German Oberliga.

== Playing career ==
Knackstedt entered the major junior ranks with the Red Deer Rebels of the Western Hockey League (WHL) in 2004–05. Three seasons later, in his draft year, he was traded to the Moose Jaw Warriors and put up 56 points between the two teams. He was then drafted in the seventh round, 189th overall, by the Boston Bruins in the 2007 NHL entry draft. Returning to the Warriors, Knackstedt recorded a team-leading 85 points, seventh overall in league scoring. At the end of the WHL season, he was assigned by Boston to complete 2007–08 with the Providence Bruins of the American Hockey League (AHL).

On December 9, 2010, he was traded along with Jeff LoVecchio to the Florida Panthers in exchange for Sean Zimmerman and a conditional seventh round pick in the 2011 NHL entry draft.

Knackstedt signed a one-year contract with Bolzano-Bozen Foxes (HC Bolzano) as a free agent on 2011.

On September 25, 2013, the Bakersfield Condors of the ECHL signed Knackstedt for the 2013–14 season.

After a successful season with the Condors, Knackstedt opted to resume a European career in signing a one-year deal with Rubin Tyumen of the Russian second league the VHL, on August 6, 2014. He endured a journeyman 2014–15 season, transferring to fellow VHL club, Saryarka Karaganda before finishing the season in Germany with ESV Kaufbeuren of the DEL2.

On November 4, 2015, Knackstedt belatedly signed for the 2015–16 season, in returning to America to sign with the Greenville Swamp Rabbits of the ECHL.

== Career statistics ==
=== Regular season and playoffs ===
			Regular season					Playoffs
Season	Team	League	GP	G	A	Pts	PIM	GP	G	A	Pts	PIM
2004–05	Red Deer Rebels	WHL	52	1	2	3	34	7	0	0	0	2
2005–06	Red Deer Rebels	WHL	72	12	28	40	36	—	—	—	—	—
2006–07	Red Deer Rebels	WHL	33	10	7	17	54	—	—	—	—	—
2006–07	Moose Jaw Warriors	WHL	39	13	26	39	44	—	—	—	—	—
2007–08	Moose Jaw Warriors	WHL	72	31	54	85	116	6	1	1	2	8
2007–08	Providence Bruins	AHL	5	2	0	2	2	4	1	0	1	0
2008–09	Providence Bruins	AHL	71	10	16	26	55	16	3	1	4	11
2009–10	Providence Bruins	AHL	67	14	24	38	30	—	—	—	—	—
2010–11	Providence Bruins	AHL	22	7	5	12	12	—	—	—	—	—
2010–11	Rochester Americans	AHL	44	5	9	14	26	—	—	—	—	—
2011–12	HC Bolzano	ITA	42	18	35	53	64	12	10	11	21	6
2012–13	Tingsryds AIF	Allsv	11	0	1	1	0	—	—	—	—	—
2012–13	Hockey Milano Rossoblu	ITA	27	9	14	23	18	6	1	4	5	2
2013–14	Bakersfield Condors	ECHL	69	19	32	51	101	16	5	9	14	4
2013–14	Abbotsford Heat	AHL	1	0	0	0	5	—	—	—	—	—
2014–15	Rubin Tyumen	VHL	17	2	3	5	11	—	—	—	—	—
2014–15	Saryarka Karaganda	VHL	6	1	0	1	6	—	—	—	—	—
2014–15	ESV Kaufbeuren	DEL2	10	4	5	9	24	—	—	—	—	—
2015–16	Greenville Swamp Rabbits	ECHL	45	12	19	31	45	—	—	—	—	—
2015–16	Quad City Mallards	ECHL	18	3	10	13	14	4	1	1	2	4
2016–17	Herlev Eagles	DEN	32	12	19	31	143	—	—	—	—	—
2016–17	Esbjerg Energy	DEN	4	3	2	5	4	17	8	10	18	42
2017–18	Eispiraten Crimmitschau	DEL2	51	22	46	68	122	9	3	7	10	8
2018–19	Dresdner Eislöwen	DEL2	51	21	50	71	119	14	6	21	27	22
2019–20	Dresdner Eislöwen	DEL2	51	20	47	67	91	2	2	3	5	2
2020–21	Dresdner Eislöwen	DEL2	43	23	28	51	32	—	—	—	—	—
2021–22	Dresdner Eislöwen	DEL2	51	24	52	76	35	6	5	3	8	8
2022–23	Dresdner Eislöwen	DEL2	51	16	31	47	22	7	1	3	4	31
2023–24	Selber Wölfe	DEL2	49	23	23	46	73	—	—	—	—	—
AHL totals			210	38	54	92	130	20	4	1	5	11
DEL2 totals			357	153	282	435	518	38	17	37	54	71

=== International ===
Year	Team	Event	Result	GP	G	A	Pts	PIM
2005	Canada Western	U17	1st place, gold medalist(s)	6	1	0	1	2
Junior totals				6	1	0	1	2
