= Stefan Della Rovere =

Canadian ice hockey player (born 1990)

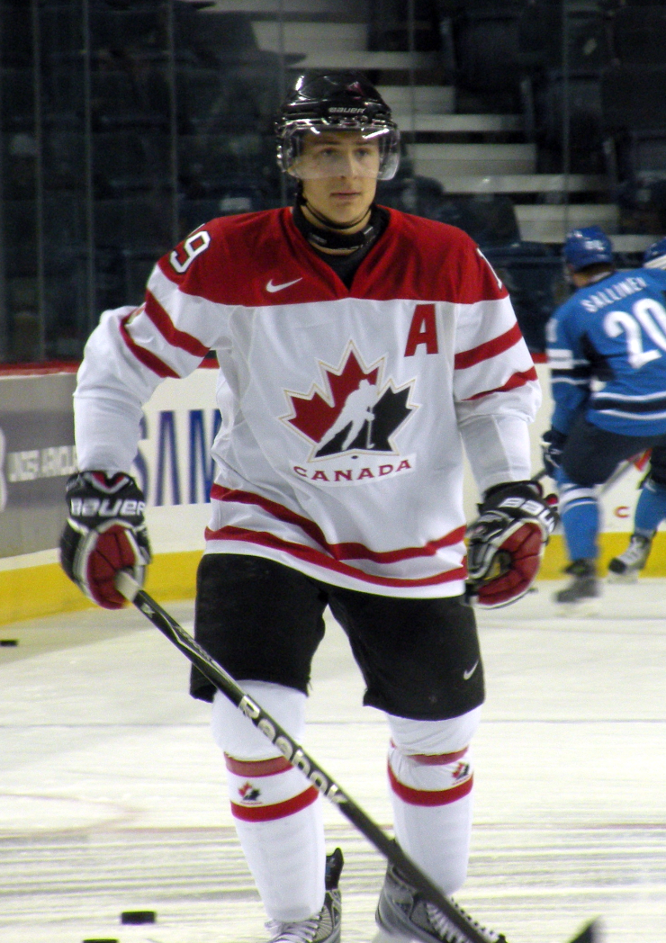
- Born: February 25, 1990 (age 36) Richmond Hill, Ontario, Canada
- Height: 5 ft 11 in (180 cm)
- Weight: 205 lb (93 kg; 14 st 9 lb)
- Position: Left wing
- Shoots: Left
- team Former teams: Free agent St. Louis Blues; HC Valpellice; HC Fassa; Braehead Clan; Kassel Huskies; Sheffield Steelers; Dresdner Eislöwen; Heilbronner Falken
- NHL draft: 204th overall, 2008; Washington Capitals
- Playing career: 2009–present

Stefan Gabriel Della Rovere (born February 25, 1990) is a Canadian former professional ice hockey player. He most recently played under contract with Heilbronner Falken of the DEL2. Della Rovere was drafted in the seventh round, 204th overall, by the Washington Capitals in the 2008 NHL entry draft.

Internationally, Della Rovere represented Canada at the 2009 and 2010 World Junior Ice Hockey Championships, winning a gold and silver medal respectively.

== Playing career ==
Della Rovere grew up in Maple, Ontario, a suburban community northwest of Toronto. He attended St. Joan of Arc Catholic High School in Maple. He played his minor hockey in the Greater Toronto Hockey League with the Vaughan Rangers, Toronto Marlboros and Toronto Jr. Canadiens.

After his 2005–06 minor midget year with the Jr. Canadiens, Della Rovere joined the Barrie Colts of the Ontario Hockey League (OHL) as their first round selection, 16th overall, in the 2006 OHL Priority Selection draft. He scored 7 goals in 48 games as a 17-year-old rookie, and won a gold medal with Team Ontario at the 2007 Canada Winter Games.

After improving to 13 goals and 32 points in 2007–08, Della Rovere was selected by the Washington Capitals in the seventh round of the 2008 NHL entry draft. He has become a valuable prospect in the eyes of the Capitals following a standout season with the Colts in 2008–09 that also saw him earn a spot on Canada's gold medal-winning team at the 2009 World Junior Ice Hockey Championships. He signed a contract with the Capitals late in the season and made his professional debut with Washington's ECHL affiliate, the South Carolina Stingrays, recording one assist in two games played.

Della Rovere returned to Barrie for the 2009–10 season, where he was named team captain. While praised by his coaches and teammates for his hard working attitude, Della Rovere has also been criticized for a lack of discipline on the ice, which he promised to change upon earning a spot on the Canadian roster for the 2010 World Junior tournament.

Following the 2010 season, Della Rovere's NHL rights were traded to the St. Louis Blues in exchange for D. J. King. Della Rovere was called up by the Blues on December 1, 2010, and made his NHL debut that evening against the team that drafted him, the Washington Capitals.

On September 28, 2014, the Toronto Marlies of the American Hockey League (AHL) announced it had signed Della Rovere to an AHL contract. After competing in the Marlies training camp, he was reassigned to ECHL affiliate, the Orlando Solar Bears, for the duration of the 2014–15 season. He was designated as team captain as he scored 26 points in 59 games.

On August 30, 2015, Della Rovere was revealed at a roster ceremony to have signed a one-year contract abroad with HC Valpellice of the Italian Serie A.

After a spell with HC Fassa of the Alps Hockey League, Della Rovere joined British Elite Ice Hockey League (EIHL) side Braehead Clan in February 2017. On 21 July 2017, Della Rovere departed signed for Kassel Huskies of the German DEL2. In July 2018, Della Rovere moved back to the UK to sign for Sheffield Steelers of the EIHL.

In the 2018–19 season, Della Rovere played in 36 games for 16 points with the Steelers, before leaving the club and making a familiar return to the DEL2 in joining Dresdner Eislöwen for the remainder of the season on January 18, 2019.

== Personal life ==
Della Rovere's cousin, Kristin, is a professional ice hockey player.

== Career statistics ==
=== Regular season and playoffs ===
			Regular season					Playoffs
Season	Team	League	GP	G	A	Pts	PIM	GP	G	A	Pts	PIM
2005–06	Toronto Jr. Canadians	GTHL	47	25	31	56	69	—	—	—	—	—
2006–07	Barrie Colts	OHL	48	7	7	14	37	6	0	0	0	0
2007–08	Barrie Colts	OHL	68	13	19	32	171	9	1	2	3	16
2008–09	Barrie Colts	OHL	57	27	24	51	146	5	2	2	4	19
2008–09	South Carolina Stingrays	ECHL	2	0	1	1	6	—	—	—	—	—
2009–10	Barrie Colts	OHL	57	18	23	41	125	17	8	1	9	29
2009–10	Hershey Bears	AHL	—	—	—	—	—	2	0	0	0	0
2010–11	Peoria Rivermen	AHL	66	8	8	16	110	1	0	0	0	0
2010–11	St. Louis Blues	NHL	7	0	0	0	11	—	—	—	—	—
2011–12	Peoria Rivermen	AHL	69	4	6	10	116	—	—	—	—	—
2012–13	Peoria Rivermen	AHL	33	1	1	2	43	—	—	—	—	—
2012–13	Evansville IceMen	ECHL	12	2	5	7	36	—	—	—	—	—
2013–14	Florida Everblades	ECHL	23	5	9	14	52	—	—	—	—	—
2014–15	Orlando Solar Bears	ECHL	59	12	14	26	86	6	0	0	0	6
2015–16	HC Valpellice	ITL	39	14	16	30	92	5	2	4	6	16
2016–17	HC Fassa	AlpsHL	21	12	18	30	51	—	—	—	—	—
2016–17	Braehead Clan	EIHL	11	4	6	10	8	2	0	0	0	0
2017–18	Kassel Huskies	DEL2	51	7	12	19	48	6	1	1	2	10
2018–19	Sheffield Steelers	EIHL	36	6	7	13	56	—	—	—	—	—
2018–19	Dresdner Eislöwen	DEL2	14	8	3	11	16	14	5	6	11	40
2019–20	Heilbronner Falken	DEL2	42	21	19	40	52	—	—	—	—	—
2020–21	Heilbronner Falken	DEL2	34	21	20	41	38	—	—	—	—	—
2021–22	Heilbronner Falken	DEL2	47	19	30	49	24	13	1	7	8	10
2022–23	Heilbronner Falken	DEL2	52	14	24	38	55	—	—	—	—	—
NHL totals			7	0	0	0	11	—	—	—	—	—

Medal record

Representing Canada

Ice hockey

World Junior Championship
Gold medal – first place	2009 Canada	
Silver medal – second place	2010 Canada	

=== International ===
Year	Team	Event	Result	GP	G	A	Pts	PIM
2009	Canada	WJC	1st place, gold medalist(s)	6	1	1	2	26
2010	Canada	WJC	2nd place, silver medalist(s)	6	3	3	6	8
Junior totals				12	4	4	8	34
