= 2015–16 DEL2 season =

- League: DEL2
- Sport: Ice Hockey
- Duration: 11 September 2015–April 2016
- Number of games: 364 (52 per team)
- Number of teams: 14

Regular season
- Season champions: Bietigheim Steelers

Finals
- Champions: EC Kassel Huskies
- Runners-up: Bietigheim Steelers

DEL2 seasons
- ← 2014–15 2016–17 →

The 2015–16 DEL2 season was the third season since the founding of the DEL2, the second tier of German ice hockey, set below the Deutsche Eishockey Liga.

The regular season started on 11 September 2015 and was completed on 1 March 2016, followed by the play-offs, which finished on 22 April 2016 with EC Kassel Huskies winning the league title.

In the 2015–16 season the league was the best-supported second-tier ice hockey league in Europe with an average of 2,688 spectators per game.

== Modus ==
Fourteen teams played a regular season where each team played the other twice home and away. The teams placed first to sixth directly qualified for the play-offs while the teams placed seventh to tenth played a pre-play-off in the best-of-three format. The remained of the play-offs were staged in a best-of-seven format. The teams placed eleventh to fourteenth qualified for the play-downs, also played in the best-of-seven format with the losers of the first round advancing to the second. The loser of the second round was nominally relegated, but Heilbronn retained its league place once more after the Fischtown Penguins were elevated to the DEL for the following season.

The league champion does not have the right for direct promotion to the Deutsche Eishockey Liga but, in September 2015, the DEL and DEL2 agreed to reintroduce promotion and relegation between the two leagues from the 2017–18 season onwards. The DEL2 champion would then have the opportunity to be promoted, provided it fulfilled the licensing requirements of the DEL, while the last-placed DEL club would be relegated.

After DEL club Hamburg Freezers returned their licence in May 2016 the Fischtown Pinguins announced that they had applied for a DEL licence and were interested in taking up Hamburg's place in the league, with the DEL intending to keep the number of clubs in the league at 14. On 1 July 2016 it was announced that the Pinguins had been granted a DEL licence for 2016–17.

== Regular season ==
The regular season saw one new club in the league, EHC Freiburg while the Heilbronner Falken, originally relegated at the end of the 2014–15 season, remained in the league after EV Landshut was relegated for financial reasons.

Pos	Team	Pld	W	OTW	OTL	L	GF	GA	GD	Pts	Qualification
1	Bietigheim Steelers	52	34	3	3	12	207	130	+77	111	Advanced to playoffs
2	Fischtown Pinguins (P)	52	31	7	4	10	203	135	+68	111	Advanced to playoffs
3	Ravensburg Towerstars	52	24	10	0	18	202	136	+66	92	Advanced to playoffs
4	EC Kassel Huskies (C)	52	23	8	7	14	201	164	+37	92	Advanced to playoffs
5	Löwen Frankfurt	52	26	3	5	18	181	146	+35	89	Advanced to playoffs
6	EC Bad Nauheim	52	24	4	8	16	158	158	0	88	Advanced to playoffs
7	Dresdner Eislöwen	52	23	6	5	18	193	164	+29	86	Advanced to pre-playoffs
8	Starbulls Rosenheim	52	21	6	5	20	176	124	+52	80	Advanced to pre-playoffs
9	SC Riessersee	52	18	5	6	23	165	176	−11	70	Advanced to pre-playoffs
10	Eispiraten Crimmitschau	52	20	1	4	27	158	188	−30	66	Advanced to pre-playoffs
11	Lausitzer Füchse	52	15	5	5	27	121	166	−45	60	Advanced to play-downs
12	ESV Kaufbeuren	52	15	1	9	27	153	199	−46	56	Advanced to play-downs
13	EHC Freiburg	52	14	4	5	29	128	179	−51	55	Advanced to play-downs
14	Heilbronner Falken	52	7	6	3	36	131	225	−94	36	Advanced to play-downs

Source: kicker.de
Rules for classification: 1) points; 2) head-to-head points; 3) head-to-head goal difference; 4) head-to-head number of goals scored.
(C) Champion; (P) Promoted

== Playoffs ==
=== Championship ===
The championship play-offs:

First round
7	Dresdner Eislöwen	2
10	Crimmitschau	1
8	SB Rosenheim	2
9	SC Riessersee	1

Quarterfinals
1	Bietigheim Steelers	4
8	SB Rosenheim	1
3	Ravensburg	4
6	EC Bad Nauheim	1
2	Fischtown Pinguins	3
7	Dresdner Eislöwen	4
4	EC Kassel Huskies	4
5	Löwen Frankfurt	0

Semifinals
1	Bietigheim Steelers	4
7	Dresdner Eislöwen	1
(Pairings are re-seeded after the first and second round)
3	Ravensburg	2
4	EC Kassel Huskies	4

Finals
1	Bietigheim Steelers	0
4	EC Kassel Huskies	4

=== Relegation ===
The relegation play-offs:

Semifinals
9	Lausitzer Füchse	4
12	Heilbronner Falken	1
10	ESV Kaufbeuren	3
11	EHC Freiburg	4

Finals
12	Heilbronner Falken	3
10	ESV Kaufbeuren	4
