= Ty Wishart =

Canadian ice hockey player

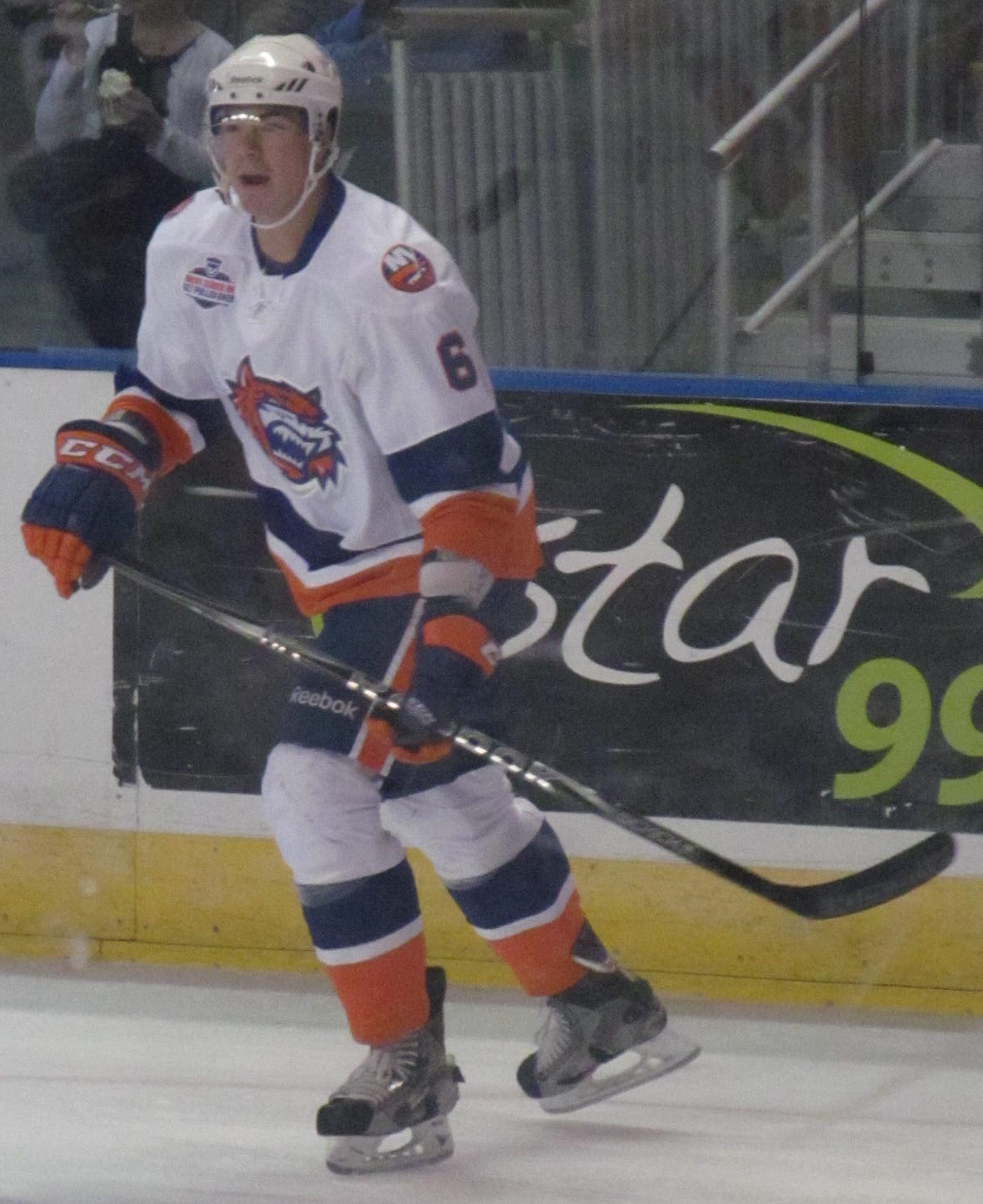
- Born: May 19, 1988 (age 38) Comox, British Columbia, Canada
- Height: 6 ft 4 in (193 cm)
- Weight: 215 lb (98 kg; 15 st 5 lb)
- Position: Defence
- Shoots: Left
- DEL2 team Former teams: Eispiraten Crimmitschau; Tampa Bay Lightning; New York Islanders; Schwenninger Wild Wings; Mora IK; HC '05 Banská Bystrica; HC Dynamo Pardubice; Fehérvár AV19
- NHL draft: 16th overall, 2006; San Jose Sharks
- Playing career: 2008–present

Ty Wishart (born May 19, 1988) is a Canadian professional ice hockey defenceman. He is currently playing with the Melbourne Mustangs in the AIHL.

Wishart grew up in Comox, British Columbia, playing minor hockey there until his midget years.

== Playing career ==
In the 2010–11 season, Wishart was with Lightning affiliate the Norfolk Admirals when on January 1, 2011, he was traded by the Tampa Bay Lightning to the New York Islanders for goaltender Dwayne Roloson. He was directly assigned to Islanders' AHL affiliate the Sound Tigers, before he was later recalled to make his debut with the Islanders. Wishart scored his first NHL goal on February 13, 2011, against Ryan Miller of the Buffalo Sabres in a 7–6 overtime victory.

Prior to the 2013–14 season, Wishart left North America and signed a contract with Schwenninger Wild Wings of the German DEL on August 29, 2013. While Wishart was expected play for the team during 2014–15 season, in August 2014 the Wild Wings terminated his contract at Wishart's request so he could return to North America for personal reasons.

After a stint with ECHL's Evansville Icemen in 2014–15, he moved to Sweden during the season to join Mora IK of the second-tier Allsvenskan league. On October 1, 2015, he inked a deal with German DEL2 club, Eispiraten Crimmitschau for the remainder of the 2015–16 season.

Entering his seventh season abroad, following tenures in Sweden, Slovakia, Czech Republic and Hungary, Wishart returned to former German club, Eispiraten Crimmitschau for the 2019–20 season.

Wishart is now a member of the Melbourne Mustangs in the AIHL, for season 2022.

== Career statistics ==
=== Regular season and playoffs ===
			Regular season					Playoffs
Season	Team	League	GP	G	A	Pts	PIM	GP	G	A	Pts	PIM
2004–05	Prince George Cougars	WHL	58	1	7	8	41	—	—	—	—	—
2005–06	Prince George Cougars	WHL	70	5	32	37	68	5	0	0	0	4
2006–07	Prince George Cougars	WHL	62	11	38	49	59	15	3	8	11	6
2007–08	Prince George Cougars	WHL	40	12	28	40	34	—	—	—	—	—
2007–08	Moose Jaw Warriors	WHL	32	4	23	27	18	6	1	3	4	2
2007–08	Worcester Sharks	AHL	5	0	0	0	0	—	—	—	—	—
2008–09	Norfolk Admirals	AHL	61	1	6	7	25	—	—	—	—	—
2008–09	Tampa Bay Lightning	NHL	5	0	1	1	0	—	—	—	—	—
2009–10	Norfolk Admirals	AHL	76	9	23	32	44	—	—	—	—	—
2010–11	Norfolk Admirals	AHL	31	4	14	18	33	—	—	—	—	—
2010–11	Bridgeport Sound Tigers	AHL	20	0	9	9	8	—	—	—	—	—
2010–11	New York Islanders	NHL	20	1	4	5	10	—	—	—	—	—
2011–12	Bridgeport Sound Tigers	AHL	71	5	14	19	32	3	0	0	0	2
2011–12	New York Islanders	NHL	1	0	0	0	0	—	—	—	—	—
2012–13	Bridgeport Sound Tigers	AHL	62	7	17	24	32	—	—	—	—	—
2013–14	Schwenninger Wild Wings	DEL	50	5	11	16	18	—	—	—	—	—
2014–15	Evansville IceMen	ECHL	14	1	1	2	4	—	—	—	—	—
2014–15	Mora IK	Allsv	14	1	1	2	4	—	—	—	—	—
2015–16	Eispiraten Crimmitschau	DEL2	46	5	24	29	43	3	0	1	1	2
2016–17	HC ’05 iClinic Banská Bystrica	SVK	49	5	6	11	22	15	2	9	11	2
2017–18	HC Dynamo Pardubice	ELH	50	5	9	14	65	7	0	1	1	4
2018–19	HC Dynamo Pardubice	ELH	27	4	3	7	14	—	—	—	—	—
2018–19	Fehérvár AV19	AUT	16	2	2	4	2	6	1	3	4	4
2019–20	Eispiraten Crimmitschau	DEL2	31	7	16	23	32	—	—	—	—	—
2020–21	SC Csíkszereda	EL	19	6	7	13		17	6	7	13
2020–21	SC Csíkszereda	ROU	10	3	6	9	2	9	1	4	5	4
2021–22	TH Unia Oświęcim	POL	9	2	2	4	10	—	—	—	—	—
2021–22	Eispiraten Crimmitschau	DEL2	42	1	8	9	22	4	0	0	0	4
2021–22	Melbourne Mustangs	AUS	18	7	29	36	22	1	0	2	2	0
2022–23	Melbourne Mustangs	AUS	21	15	40	55	8	—	—	—	—	—
AHL totals			326	26	83	109	174	3	0	0	0	2
NHL totals			26	1	5	6	10	—	—	—	—	—

=== International ===
Year	Team	Event	GP	G	A	Pts	PIM
2005	Canada	U18	5	0	0	0	16
2006	Canada	WJC18	7	0	0	0	14
Junior totals			12	0	0	0	30

== Awards and honours ==
Award	Year
WHL
West Second All-Star Team	2007
East Second All-Star Team	2008

Awards and achievements
Preceded by Devin Setoguchi	San Jose Sharks first-round draft pick 2006	Succeeded by Logan Couture
