= 2019–20 DEL2 season =

- League: DEL2
- Sport: Ice Hockey
- Duration: 13 September 2019 – 10 March 2020
- Games: 364 (52 per team)
- Teams: 14
- TV partner(s): Sprade TV eoTV

Regular season
- Season champions: Löwen Frankfurt
- Top scorer: Dylan Wruck (Falken)
- Relegated to Oberliga: No relegation (relegation play-offs cancelled)

Playoffs
- Champions: No champion (play-offs cancelled)

DEL2 seasons
- ← 2018–19 2020–21 →

The 2019–20 DEL2 season was the seventh season since the founding of the DEL2, the second tier of German ice hockey, set below the Deutsche Eishockey Liga. The season began on 13 September 2019 and prematurely ended on 10 March 2020 due to the coronavirus pandemic (COVID-19). Löwen Frankfurt was named winner of the regular season, but no season champion was declared with the championship play-offs called off. In addition, the relegation play-offs were also cancelled so the league decided there would be no relegation for the season.

== Modus ==
Fourteen teams competed in the 2019–20 DEL2 regular season. EV Landshut was promoted from Germany's third division, Oberliga. Each team played each other twice in the regular season, home and away, for a total of 52 matches each. The top six teams directly qualified for the championship playoffs, played in a best of seven format. Teams placed seven to ten advanced to the championship playoff qualifiers, which followed a best of three format. The bottom four teams enter the relegation playoffs. The two losing teams from round 1 face off in the relegation final with the losing team being relegated to Oberliga.

The DEL2 champion does not automatically get promoted to DEL. In September 2015, the DEL and DEL2 agreed to reintroduce promotion and relegation between the two leagues from the 2017–18 season onwards. The DEL2 champion would then have the opportunity to be promoted, provided it fulfilled the licensing requirements of the DEL, while the last-placed DEL club would be relegated. In 2018, the two leagues signed a new agreement to reintroduce an automatic promotion and relegation system to start in 2020–21.

== Regular season ==
=== Results ===
The cross table represents the results of all matches of the regular season for 2019/20. The home team is listed in the middle column, the visiting team in the top row.

First round														Team	Second round													
FRA	SCB	RVT	ESV	LFX	ECN	ECK	HNF	DRE	EPC	BTT	ECT	FRB	EVL	Team	FRA	SCB	RVT	ESV	LFX	ECN	ECK	HNF	DRE	EPC	BTT	ECT	FRB	EVL
	6:1	4:3^{O}	3:2	4:3^{S}	2:5	6:3	5:3	3:2	1:4	4:3^{S}	2:3^{O}	3:1	8:0	FRA		5:0	3:1	5:0 (Note: Frankfurt were declared 5:0 winners over Kaufbeuren due to Kaufbeuren icing a suspended player. The original score line was a 5:2 victory to Kaufbeuren)	4:3^{O}	4:1	4:3	3:4^{O}	6:5^{S}	7:1	3:1	4:1	5:4^{O}	5:2
3:0		4:1	3:2	1:4	0:2	4:2	4:7	4:1	4:0	4:1	9:5	0:3	4:3^{S}	SCB	1:4		5:3	5:6	4:2	7:0	1:7	5:2	1:2	1:5	5:0	2:3^{O}	0:1	2:1
4:3^{O}	2:3^{S}		4:0	6:5^{S}	2:3	5:2	3:2	4:3	3:4^{S}	5:6^{S}	3:4^{O}	2:4	4:2	RVT	2:3^{S}	6:5^{O}		5:2	7:1	7:3	2:4	5:3	4:5	4:2	0:4	2:3	3:2^{S}	4:3^{O}
3:1	5:1	2:4		1:3	6:3	3:2	2:8	4:1	5:2	5:1	2:3	3:2	3:4^{O}	ESV	3:4	6:4	3:2		2:4	4:2	1:3	3:2	6:1	5:2	2:7	4:3^{O}	3:1	3:7
1:3	3:2	1:3	4:1		1:2	2:5	2:1	3:7	6:2	5:3	2:3^{O}	7:3	4:5^{O}	LFX	6:3	2:4	4:1	6:1		4:1	1:0	4:3^{O}	5:6	4:7	5:3	6:3	1:3	3:0
7:6^{O}	3:2^{S}	5:1	4:2	5:3		0:5	1:7	2:3^{O}	8:3	4:2	2:3^{O}	4:3	2:1	ECN	2:3^{S}	1:0^{S}	1:2^{S}	3:5	5:1		2:1	1:2	6:5^{O}	4:6	3:2^{S}	1:2^{S}	5:1	4:3^{S}
3:2	10:2	3:1	7:3	1:0	2:3		7:1	6:3	4:2	3:2	6:3	5:3	5:4	ECK	7:5	4:0	4:1	6:3	3:2^{S}	2:3^{S}		2:5	7:3	2:6	4:0	0:3	2:4	2:3^{O}
4:1	4:1	5:2	3:5	7:1	5:3	4:3		3:2	2:6	4:3	4:5	6:3	3:1	HNF	7:6^{S}	2:5	2:5	6:3	4:3	1:4	4:2		9:2	2:4	5:3	2:3^{O}	6:3	4:3^{S}
5:4^{O}	7:5	3:6	1:2^{O}	4:6	6:2	1:4	8:5		5:3	6:5	0:4	2:3	1:2^{O}	DRE	4:3	4:3^{S}	4:5^{O}	5:1	5:3	4:1	6:5^{O}	5:4		5:3	2:4	3:2^{S}	5:2	3:1
2:3^{S}	2:1^{O}	0:5	4:3^{S}	6:3	3:4	1:4	2:4	3:2		3:6	4:3	3:2^{O}	3:4^{O}	EPC	5:2	3:5	1:4	2:4	2:7	1:2^{S}	1:4	4:2	7:5		0:6	3:5	3:2^{S}	2:1
10:7	3:2^{O}	1:4	7:5	3:5	2:3	3:4^{S}	2:4	4:3^{O}	4:5		3:2^{O}	0:2	3:2	BTT	2:3^{O}	4:2	5:3	6:7^{S}	6:3	4:2	4:3^{S}	6:5^{S}	6:3	2:4		4:3^{O}	3:0	5:3
2:5	0:5	4:3^{O}	8:2	5:1	4:0	5:1	5:6^{O}	5:4	3:2^{O}	5:4		3:4	5:6^{O}	ECT	1:2	2:0	1:2^{S}	2:5	2:3^{S}	3:1	3:1	8:6	1:2	4:2	5:7		5:2	4:5^{S}
3:1	2:3	3:2	0:4	2:3^{O}	1:0	5:4^{S}	3:4^{O}	7:1	4:1	3:1	5:3		5:0	FRB	2:4	5:1	4:2	4:3	3:2	6:3	4:2	4:5^{O}	6:3	5:0	4:1	5:4		4:3^{O}
5:2	2:3	1:3	5:8	7:1	6:1	3:4	4:3	4:7	4:5^{S}	4:3	4:3	3:1		EVL	2:6	3:4	1:4	2:1	5:4^{O}	3:2^{O}	5:6^{O}	6:3	4:3^{O}	3:2^{O}	1:3	3:2	1:4	

Legend: ^{O} Overtime; ^{S} Shootout

=== Standings ===
Pos	Team	Pld	W	OTW	OTL	L	GF	GA	GD	Pts	Qualification or relegation
1	Löwen Frankfurt	52	23	10	6	13	195	155	+40	95	2020 DEL2 Championship Playoffs
2	EC Kassel Huskies	52	27	3	5	17	191	147	+44	92	2020 DEL2 Championship Playoffs
3	Wölfe Freiburg	52	27	2	7	16	162	143	+19	92	2020 DEL2 Championship Playoffs
4	Heilbronner Falken	52	23	6	3	20	209	186	+23	84	2020 DEL2 Championship Playoffs
5	Tölzer Löwen	52	18	9	9	16	176	166	+10	81	2020 DEL2 Championship Playoffs
6	Ravensburg Towerstars	52	19	8	7	18	171	155	+16	80	2020 DEL2 Championship Playoffs
7	EC Bad Nauheim	52	18	8	6	20	141	164	−23	76	2020 DEL2 Championship Playoff; Qualifiers
8	Bietigheim Steelers	52	21	2	7	22	147	163	−16	74	2020 DEL2 Championship Playoff; Qualifiers
9	ESV Kaufbeuren	52	22	3	2	25	169	187	−18	74	2020 DEL2 Championship Playoff; Qualifiers
10	Dresdner Eislöwen	52	19	5	7	21	188	208	−20	74	2020 DEL2 Championship Playoff; Qualifiers
11	Lausitzer Füchse	52	20	3	7	22	168	179	−11	73	2020 DEL2 Relegation Playoffs
12	Bayreuth Tigers	52	17	7	5	23	183	183	0	70	2020 DEL2 Relegation Playoffs
13	Eispiraten Crimmitschau	52	16	6	5	25	153	194	−41	65	2020 DEL2 Relegation Playoffs
14	EV Landshut	52	11	11	7	23	160	183	−23	62	2020 DEL2 Relegation Playoffs

Source: www.kicker.de www.del-2.org
Rules for classification:
Tie-break: 1) points; 2) goal difference; 3) number of goals scored
Points: 3 points for regulation win; 2 points for OT or SO win; 1 point for OT or SO loss; 0 points for regulation loss

=== Top scorers ===
These are the top-ten scorers in DEL2 for the 2019–20 season. (Table is created at the conclusion of the DEL2 regular season)

Name	Team	GP	G	A	PTS	+/−	PIM
Dylan Wruck	Heilbronner Falken	51	24	64	88	+9	12
Sami Blomqvist	ESV Kaufbeuren	52	38	36	74	+5	28
Marco Pfleger	Tölzer Löwen	52	31	38	69	−1	28
Mathieu Pompei	EV Landshut	52	29	39	68	+4	36
Cam Spiro	Wölfe Freiburg	52	26	41	67	0	16
Mario Lamoureux	Dresdner Eislöwen	52	23	44	67	−1	64
Jordan Knackstedt	Dresdner Eislöwen	51	20	47	67	+6	91
Mike Hammond	Lausitzer Füchse	48	18	49	67	+1	10
Juuso Rajala	Bayreuth Tigers	51	16	50	66	+10	24
Roope Ranta	Löwen Frankfurt	52	32	31	63	+20	12

=== Top goaltenders ===
These are the top-ten goaltenders in DEL2 for the 2019–20 season. (Table is created at the conclusion of the DEL2 regular season)

Name	Team	GP	SO	MP	GA	GAA	SH	SV	SV%
Ben Meisner	Wölfe Freiburg	50	6	2992:30	127	2.55	1617	1490	92.15%
Mac Carruth	Lausitzer Füchse	43	2	2477:17	123	2.98	1538	1415	92.00%
Felix Bick	EC Bad Nauheim	47	2	2841:35	134	2.83	1573	1439	91.48%
Gerald Kuhn	EC Kassel Huskies	39	4	2381:36	95	2.39	1115	1020	91.48%
Jimmy Hertel	Löwen Frankfurt	23	0	1362:15	66	2.91	704	638	90.63%
Patrick Klein	Löwen Frankfurt	20	2	1785:52	84	2.82	887	803	90.53%
Stephon Williams	Bietigheim Steelers	38	5	2095:26	105	3.01	1083	978	90.30%
Olafr Schmidt	Ravensburg Towerstars	36	2	2012:12	89	2.65	852	763	89.55%
Brett Jaeger	Bayreuth Tigers	28	1	1502:09	77	3.08	737	660	89.55%
Marco Wölfl	Ravensburg Towerstars	22	0	1150:43	57	2.97	517	460	88.97%

Note: To qualify for this list, goaltenders need to have played a minimum of 20 matches

== Playoffs ==
Due to the early cancellation of the season, the championship and relegation play-offs were called off without being played. DEL2 decided no team would be relegated and no team would be named champion.

=== Championship ===
The championship playoffs reference:

Pre-Playoffs
7	EC Bad Nauheim	0
10	Dresdner Eislöwen	2
8	Bietigheim Steelers	0
9	ESV Kaufbeuren	2

Note: All numbers represent series results, not a match score
