= EHC Bayreuth Tigers =

- City: Bayreuth, Germany
- League: Regionalliga
- Founded: 2006
- Home arena: Kunsteisstadion
- Colors: Black, gold, white
- Head coach: Larry Suarez

Franchise history
- 2006–2017: EHC Bayreuth
- 2017–2024: Bayreuth Tigers
- 2024–2026: Onesto Tigers Bayreuth
- 2026–present: EHC Bayreuth Tigers

Championships
- Regionalliga Championships: 2013

The EHC Bayreuth Tigers are a professional ice hockey team based in Bayreuth, Bavaria, Germany. The team currently plays in the Regionalliga, the fourth-highest level of ice hockey in Germany. The Tigers play their home games at the Kunsteisstadion.

== History ==
Founded in 2006 as EHC Bayreuth (Eishockey Club Bayreuth), the team began as members of the Bayernliga, the lowest level of professional hockey in Germany. The club earned two promotions in their first three years of operation, earning a spot in the Regionalliga by 2009. It took just 4 years for the Tigers to win a championship and earn another promotion, this time to the Oberliga (third tier). The club continued their rapid ascent and reached the league final in 2016. While they ultimately fell to the Tilburg Trappers, because their opponents were a Dutch team, Bayreuth was awarded a promotion to DEL2.

The team's first season in the German second league ended with them posting a middling 21–21–10 mark, the first time the club did not post a winning record. After that season, the team rebranded as the 'Bayreuth Tigers' but the new name did not portent a brighter future. The second season was a disaster for the club as they finished last in the standings and lost in relegation. However, due to the financial problems of SC Riessersee, Bayreuth was given a reprieve and allowed to remain in DEL2. While Bayreuth saw some improvement over the next few years, the team was continually at risk of relegation and had to stave off demotion every year (relegation in 2020 and 2021 did not occur due to the COVID-19 pandemic). In 2023, even after saving themselves in the relegation round, the Tigers were unable to secure a license for the following year and were demoted back to the Oberliga.

A year after returning to the third tier, the club reached a sponsorship agreement with Onesto, an Ordering and Booking company, to shore up the club financial situation. As a result, the team officially became the 'Onesto Tigers Bayreuth' in 2024. In 2026, the club changed its name to the EHC Bayreuth Tigers.

== Season-by-season results ==
Since 2009

Season	GP	W	OTW	OTL	L	Pts	GF	GA	Finish	Playoffs
Regionalliga
2009–10	30	17	2	1	10	56	129	105	4th of 16, Bayernliga	Lost First Intermediate Group A Round Robin, 3–3–0
2010–11	30	18	1	5	6	61	151	95	t-2nd of 16, Bayernliga	Lost Group A Round Robin, 2–0–2–2
2011–12	30	21	2	2	5	69	136	80	3rd of 16, Bayernliga	Won Group B Round Robin, 4–0–2–0; Lost Semifinal series, 0–2 (EV Weiden)
2012–13	26	20	2	0	4	64	141	62	2nd of 14, Bayernliga	Won Group B Round Robin, 8–0–0–0; Won Semifinal series, 2–0 (EC Pfaffenhofen); Won Championship series, 3–1 (ERC Sonthofen 1999)
Oberliga
2013–14	44	23	3	2	16	77	177	136	4th of 12, Oberliga South	Won South Qualification Semifinal series, 4–2 (EHC Klostersee); Lost South Qualification Final series, 1–3 (VER Selb)
2014–15	44	26	4	3	11	89	194	128	4th of 12, Oberliga South	Won South Qualification series, 4–0 (Tölzer Löwen); Lost series, 0–3 (EHC Freiburg)
2015–16	40	24	4	0	12	80	156	113	2nd of 11, Oberliga South	Won South Qualification Finals series, 3–0 (Deggendorfer SC); Won Quarterfinal series, 3–0 (Saale Bulls Halle); Won Semifinal series, 3–1 (EVR Regensburg); Lost Championship series, 0–3 (Tilburg Trappers)
DEL2
2016–17	52	21	2	8	21	75	146	155	8th of 14, DEL2	Won First Round series, 2–1 (SC Riessersee); Lost Quarterfinal series, 1–4 (Bietigheim Steelers)
2017–18	52	10	6	5	31	47	134	195	14th of 14, DEL2	Lost Relegation Semifinal series, 3–4 (Lausitzer Füchse); Lost Relegation Final series, 1–4 (Tölzer Löwen)
2018–19	52	18	6	4	26	68	170	196	11th of 14, DEL2	Won Relegation Semifinal series, 4–0 (Deggendorfer SC)
2019–20	52	17	7	5	23	70	183	183	12th of 14, DEL2	relegation cancelled
2020–21	50	12	4	5	29	49	145	205	14th of 14, DEL2	relegation cancelled
2021–22	52	17	1	6	28	59	165	203	11th of 14, DEL2	Lost Relegation Semifinal series, 2–4 (Selber Wölfe); Won Relegation Final series, 4–2 (Tölzer Löwen)
2022–23	52	8	4	6	34	38	125	206	14th of 14, DEL2	Lost Relegation Semifinal series, 2–4 (Eispiraten Crimmitschau); Won Relegation Final series, 4–2 (Heilbronner Falken)
Oberliga
2023–24	48	22	2	5	19	75	184	182	6th of 13, Oberliga South	Did not qualify
2024–25	48	11	4	3	31	41	145	226	12th of 13, Oberliga South	Did not qualify
