= Juuso Rajala =

Finnish ice hockey player

- Born: August 27, 1988 (age 36); Tampere, Finland
- Height: 5 ft 11 in (180 cm)
- Weight: 181 lb (82 kg; 12 st 13 lb)
- Position: Forward
- Shoots: Left
- DEL2 team Former teams: EHC Bayreuth; Lukko; HC TPS; Espoo Blues; Ilves; KooKoo
- NHL draft: Undrafted
- Playing career: 2009–present

Juuso Rajala (born August 27, 1988) is a Finnish ice hockey player who currently plays professionally in Finland for EHC Bayreuth of DEL2. He previously played in Liiga for Lukko, HC TPS, Espoo Blues, Ilves and KooKoo.
