= Vincenz Mayer =

German ice hockey player

- Born: September 27, 1990 (age 34); Garmisch-Partenkirchen, West Germany
- Height: 6 ft 0 in (183 cm)
- Weight: 181 lb (82 kg; 12 st 13 lb)
- Position: Forward
- Shoots: Left
- DEL2 team Former teams: Ravensburg Towerstars; Grizzlys Wolfsburg
- Playing career: 2011–present

Vincenz Mayer (born September 27, 1990) is a German professional ice hockey player. He is currently playing for the Ravensburg Towerstars of the DEL2. He previously played with the Grizzlys Wolfsburg in the Deutsche Eishockey Liga (DEL).
