= Spie Arena =

Arena in Rosenheim, Germany

Coordinates: 47°51′1.6″N 12°7′55.5″E

SPIE Arena
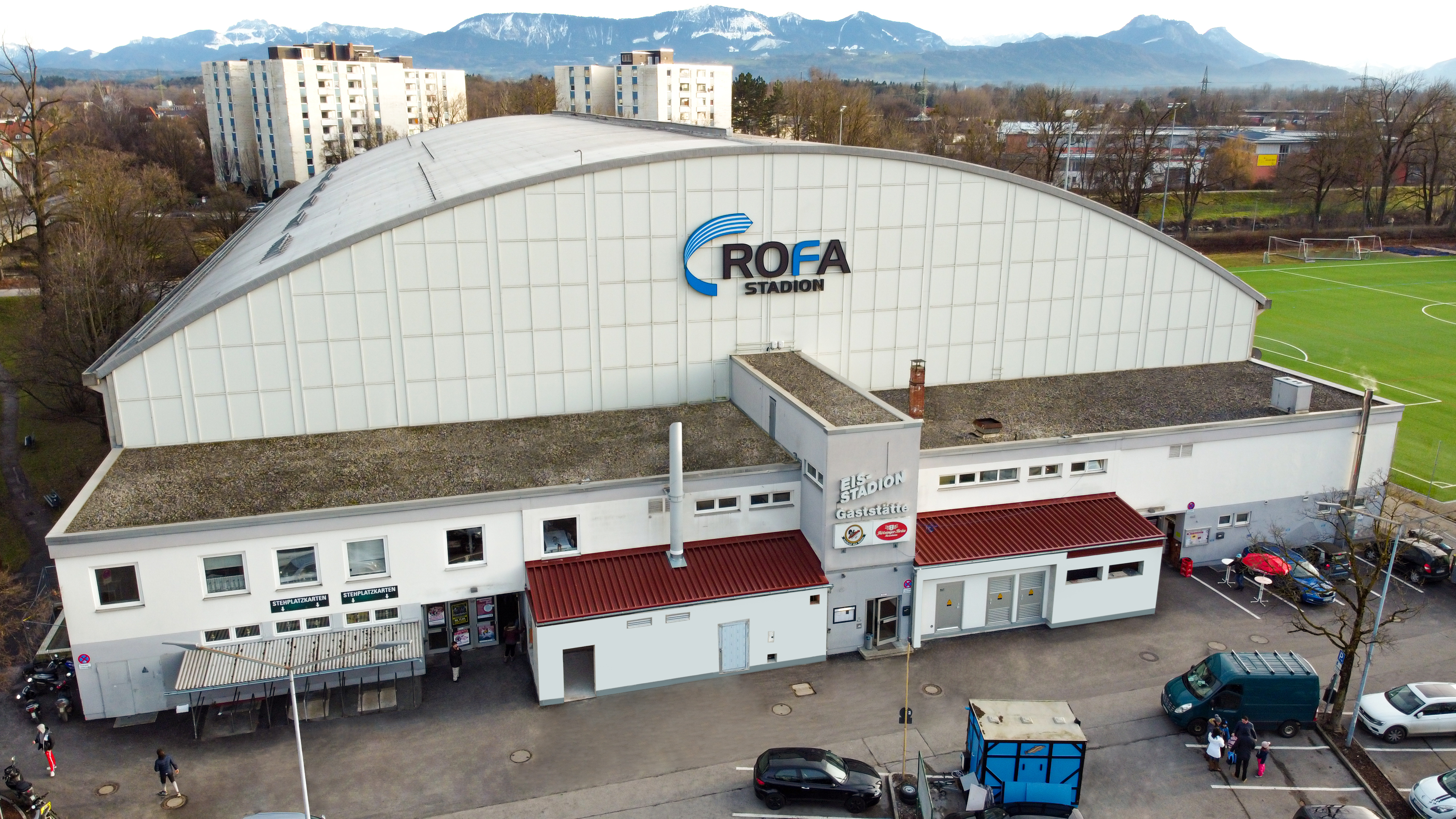
- Arena in Rosenheim under the former name
- Interactive map of SPIE Arena
- Former names: Frucade-Stadion; Marox-Stadion; Städtisches Kathrein-Stadion (1990s–2015); Städtisches Eisstadion (2016) emilo-Stadion (2016–2019); ROFA-Stadion (2019–2026)
- Location: Rosenheim, Germany
- Owner: City of Rosenheim
- Capacity: 4,425

Construction
- Built: 1961
- Opened: 13 January 1962
- Renovated: 1973
- Expanded: March 2026 – August 2027

Tenant
- Starbulls Rosenheim (DEL2) (2000–present)

The Spie Arena (stylized as SPIE Arena; formerly ROFA-Stadion) is an arena in Rosenheim, Germany. It is primarily used for ice hockey. The stadium opened in 1962 as an open-air stadium and got roofed in 1973. Now it holds 4,425 people.

It used to be named the Kathrein-Stadion, after Kathrein-Werke KG, a German manufacturer of antenna systems and related electronics, founded in Rosenheim in 1919.
