= Martin Heinisch =

Czech ice hockey player

- Born: April 6, 1985 (age 39); Most, Czechoslovakia
- Height: 6 ft 2 in (188 cm)
- Weight: 192 lb (87 kg; 13 st 10 lb)
- Position: Forward
- Shoots: Left
- Oberliga team Former teams: 1. EV Weiden; HC Litvínov
- Playing career: 2004–present

Martin Heinisch (born April 6, 1985) is a Czech professional ice hockey forward for 1. EV Weiden of the Oberliga.

He played 113 games with HC Litvínov in the Czech Extraliga.

Heinisch played previously also for KLH Chomutov and BK Mladá Boleslav.
