= Eisbären Regensburg =

- City: Regensburg, Germany
- League: DEL2
- Founded: 1962
- Home arena: Donau Arena (capacity: 4,961)
- Colors: Red, White
- Website: Official website

Eisbären Regensburg is a German professional ice hockey team based in Regensburg, Bavaria, Germany. The team currently plays in the DEL2, the second-highest level of ice hockey in Germany. Founded in 1962, the team plays at the Donau Arena.

== History ==
The Regensburg club was founded in 1962 and played in the regional leagues of the then Federal Republic of Germany until 1972. In 1972, it gained the right to play in the Oberliga, and in the 1978/79 season it made its debut in the Second Bundesliga.

From 1980 to 2000, the club played in the lower divisions. After winning the Oberliga in the 2000/01 season, Regensburg again won the right to return to the Second Bundesliga, where they played seven seasons this time, after which they were relegated to the Oberliga again. In the 2021/22 season, the Bavarian club won first place in the playoffs and a ticket to the Second German Hockey League.

== Honours ==
As of March 2024

- Oberliga

Champions: 2001, 2022
