= Andreas Brockmann =

German ice hockey player

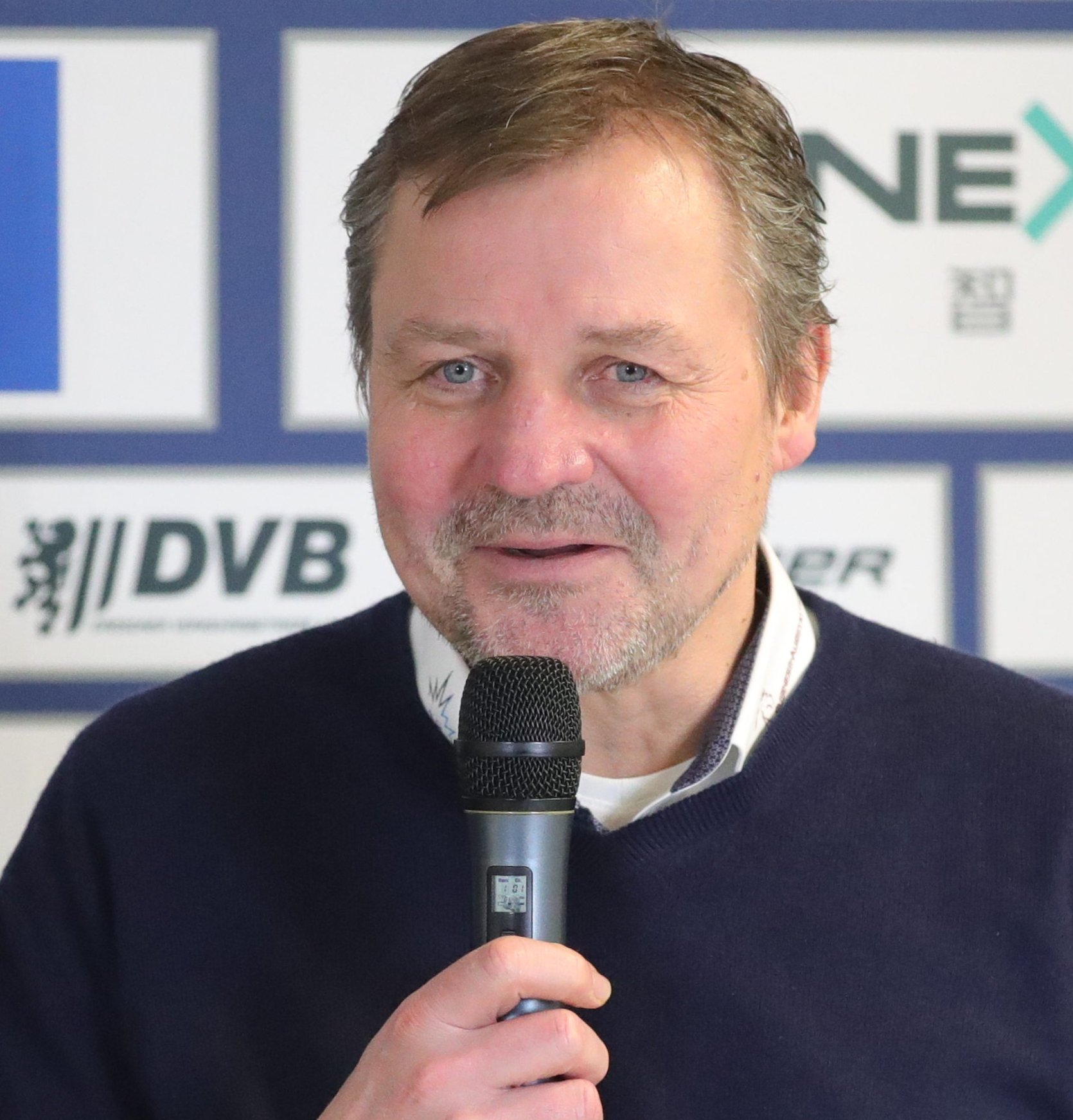
- Brockmann in 2023

Personal information
- Nationality: German
- Born: 11 June 1967 (age 57); Bad Tölz, West Germany

Sport
- Sport: Ice hockey

Andreas Brockmann (born 11 June 1967) is a German former ice hockey player. He competed in the men's tournament at the 1992 Winter Olympics.
