= DEL2 =

German ice hockey league

- Current season, competition or edition: 2026-27 DEL2 season
- Formerly: 2nd Bundesliga
- Sport: Ice hockey
- Founded: 2013; 13 years ago
- CEO: René Rudorisch
- Administrator: DEB
- Motto: "Carried by passion, at home in ice hockey"
- No. of teams: 14
- Country: Germany
- Most recent champions: Krefeld Pinguine (1st title)
- Most titles: Bietigheim Steelers (3 titles)
- Broadcasters: Sprade TV eoTV
- Level on pyramid: Level 2
- Promotion to: DEL (2020–21 onward)
- Relegation to: Oberliga
- Website: del-2.org

DEL2 (also known as Deutsche Eishockey Liga 2 or DEL II) is the second tier ice hockey league in Germany, below the Deutsche Eishockey Liga (DEL) and ahead of the Oberliga. Founded in 2013 to replace the defunct 2nd Bundesliga, DEL2 is administered by ESBG, under licence from DEB.

== History ==
The DEL2 league was founded on 2 May 2013 by Eishockeyliga Betriebsgesellschaft mbH. The foundation of the league was controversial as it was preceded by a long standing dispute between the operator of the second division, Eishockeyspielbetriebsgesellschaft mbH (ESBG), and the German Ice Hockey Federation (DEB).

In 2011, ESBG refused to sign a cooperation agreement between DEB and DEL citing unacceptable conditions. As a result, DEB withdrew their support of ESBG and promotion and relegation between the DEL and 2nd division was removed. On 18 April 2013, the Eishockeyliga Betriebsgesellschaft mbH was established by Ernst Rupp, CEO of Heilbronn Falcons. The new company was founded with the goal of reforming a new second division league. The new company quickly aligned with DEL and officially founded the new league on 2 May 2013. The DEB responded by labelling the new league an unsanctioned breakaway competition. ESBG subsequently filed an injunction against DEB in the Munich Regional Court. On 17 July 2013, the DEB, second division clubs and ESBG came to an out of court settlement on the matter. The settlement agreement between ESBG and DEB stipulated the status-quo of ESBG running the second division operations until 2018. Post 2018, the league would then be separated and self-run.

In 2014, the league expanded to include fourteen teams, the same number as the DEL. DEL2 had started with just twelve teams in the 2013/14 season.

In April 2015, DEB altered its statutes so clubs associated with DEL and DEL2 could become members of the DEB again. This decision by DEB led to a new agreement being reached between DEL and DEL2 in September 2015 to re-enable promotion and relegation between the two leagues. This system implemented was based on sporting achievement but came with specified condition caveats on the DEL2 team wishing to obtain promotion.

At the conclusion of the 2015/16 season, DEL2 was recognised as the best-supported second-tier hockey league in Europe. DEL2 had average spectator attendances of 2,688 per match.

1 July 2016, the DEL2 club Fischtown Pinguins became the first club from DEL2 to be ‘unofficially’ promoted to DEL. The Pinguins were not promoted through the DEL/DEL2 promotion system but instead applied for a vacated licence in DEL, following the withdrawal of the Hamburg Freezers who ceased operations on 24 May 2016.

In 2017, the DEL2 and Oberliga (German third division) reached agreement for the introduction of promotion and relegation between the two divisions. The first ever DEL2 relegation occurred at the end of the season with Starbulls Rosenheim relegated to Oberliga.

As of 2018, no DEL2 team had been able to meet the conditions for promotion to DEL. This led to new negotiations between the two leagues and in July 2018 a new agreement was reached to introduce automatic promotion and relegation between the two divisions, starting in the 2020/21 season, ten years after it was taken away.

== Current teams ==
The league had 12 teams participating in the 2013–14 season, before expanding to 14 teams from the 2014–15 season. In season 2023–24 there were 14 teams qualified out of a possible 15 as the Bayreuth Tigers didn't receive a licence due to financial issues. The league continues to feature 14 teams.

DEL2 teams for the 2025–26 season.

DEL2 Teams: 2026–27 Season
| Team | Location | | Arena | Capacity | Founded | Joined league |
| Team | City | State | Arena | Capacity | Founded | Joined league |
|---|---|---|---|---|---|---|
| Blue Devils Weiden | Weiden | Bavaria | Hans Schröpf Arena | 2,560 | 1985 | 2024 |
| Düsseldorfer EG | Düsseldorf | North Rhine-Westphalia | PSD Bank Dome | 14,282 | 1935 | 2025 |
| EC Bad Nauheim | Bad Nauheim | Hesse | Kolonel Knight Stadion | 4,500 | 1982 | 2013 |
| EC Kassel Huskies | Kassel | Hesse | Eissporthalle Kassel | 6,100 | 1977 | 2014 |
| EHC Freiburg | Freiburg im Breisgau | Baden-Württemberg | Echte Helden Arena | 3,500 | 1984 | 2015 |
| Eisbären Regensburg | Regensburg | Bavaria | Donau-Arena | 4,961 | 1962 | 2022 |
| Eispiraten Crimmitschau | Crimmitschau | Saxony | Eisstadion im Sahnpark | 5,222 | 1990 | 2013 |
| Dresdner Eislöwen | Dresden | Saxony | Joynext Arena | 3,099 | 1999 | 2026 |
| EV Landshut | Landshut | Bavaria | VR-Bank Landshut Arena | 4,448 | 1948 | 2019 |
| ECDC Memmingen Indians | Memmingen | Bavaria | KUTTER-Arena | 3,700 | 1992 | 2026 |
| Lausitzer Füchse | Weißwasser | Saxony | Eisstadion Weißwasser | 3,050 | 1932 | 2013 |
| Ravensburg Towerstars | Ravensburg | Baden-Württemberg | Eissporthalle Ravensburg | 3,300 | 1881 | 2013 |
| SC Bietigheim Steelers | Bietigheim-Bissingen | Baden-Württemberg | EgeTransArena | 4,500 | 1981 | 2025 |
| Starbulls Rosenheim | Rosenheim | Bavaria | ROFA-Stadion | 4,425 | 1928 | 2023 |

=== Former teams ===
Former Teams
| Team | Location | | Arena | Capacity | Founded | Joined league | Left league |
| Team | City | State | Arena | Capacity | Founded | Joined league | Left league |
|---|---|---|---|---|---|---|---|
| Deggendorfer SC | Deggendorf | Bavaria | Eisstadion Deggendorf | 2,790 | 1996 | 2018 | 2019 |
| ESV Kaufbeuren | Kaufbeuren | Bavaria | Erdgas Schwaben Arena | 3,100 | 1946 | 2013 | 2026 |
| Fischtown Pinguins | Bremerhaven | Bremen | Eisarena Bremerhaven | 4,674 | 1974 | 2013 | 2016 |
| Löwen Frankfurt | Frankfurt | Hesse | Eissporthalle Frankfurt | 6,990 | 2010 | 2014 | 2022 |
| Heilbronner Falken | Heilbronn | Baden-Württemberg | Kolbenschmidt Arena | 4,000 | 1980 | 2013 | 2023 |
| Krefeld Pinguine | Krefeld | North Rhine-Westphalia | Yayla Arena | 8,029 | 1936 | 2025 | 2026 |
| Onesto Tigers Bayreuth | Bayreuth | Bavaria | Kunsteisstadion | 4,555 | 2006 | 2016 | 2023 |
| SC Riessersee | Garmisch-Partenkirchen | Bavaria | Olympia-Eissport-Zentrum | 6,929 | 1923 | 2013 | 2018 |
| Selber Wölfe | Selb | Bavaria | NETZSCH Arena | 3,983 | 1953 | 2021 | 2025 |
| Tölzer Löwen | Bad Tölz | Bavaria | Hacker-Pschorr Arena | 4,115 | 1928 | 2017 | 2022 |

== Champions ==
The champions, runners-up and regular season premiers of the league standings:

DEL2 season-by-season results
| Season | Regular season | | Playoffs | | | | | | | | | | Top scorer | | Promoted team | Relegated team |
| Season | Premiers | Pts | Champions | Result | Runners-up | G1 | G2 | G3 | G4 | G5 | G6 | G7 | Player | Pts | Promoted team | Relegated team |
|---|---|---|---|---|---|---|---|---|---|---|---|---|---|---|---|---|
| 2013–14 | Fischtown Pinguins | 104 | Fischtown Pinguins | 4:1 | Bietigheim Steelers | 4:3 | 2:3 | 4:3 | 4:2 | 3:2 | - | - | (Canada) Harrison Reed | 90 | - | - |
| 2014–15 | Bietigheim Steelers | 114 | Bietigheim Steelers | 4:2 | Fischtown Pinguins | 4:3 | 3:4 | 4:3 | 4:3 | 1:6 | 4:3 | - | (United States) Mike Collins | 81 | - | - |
| 2015–16 | Bietigheim Steelers | 111 | EC Kassel Huskies | 4:0 | Bietigheim Steelers | 1:0 | 3:2 | 3:2 | 5:2 | - | - | - | (Canada) Justin Kelly | 85 | Fischtown Pinguins | - |
| 2016–17 | Bietigheim Steelers | 109 | Löwen Frankfurt | 4:2 | Bietigheim Steelers | 7:5 | 4:0 | 4:2 | 2:3 | 1:2 | 5:2 | - | (Canada) Matt McKnight | 72 | - | Starbulls Rosenheim |
| 2017–18 | SC Riessersee | 103 | Bietigheim Steelers | 4:1 | SC Riessersee | 3:1 | 3:5 | 2:1 | 6:3 | 2:0 | - | - | (Germany) Richard Mueller | 80 | - | SC Riessersee |
| 2018–19 | Löwen Frankfurt | 97 | Ravensburg Towerstars | 4:2 | Löwen Frankfurt | 5:3 | 1:3 | 6:5 | 7:4 | 1:3 | 5:1 | - | (Finland) Roope Ranta | 79 | - | Deggendorfer SC |
| 2019–20 | Löwen Frankfurt | 94 | Play-offs cancelled due to the coronavirus pandemic | | | | | | | | | | (Canada) Dylan Wruck | 88 | - | - |
| 2020–21 | Kassel Huskies | 112 | Bietigheim Steelers | 3:2 | Kassel Huskies | 1:2 | 1:4 | 3:2 | 5:4 | 5:2 | - | - | (Germany) Marco Pfleger | 86 | Bietigheim Steelers | - |
| 2021–22 | Löwen Frankfurt | 112 | Löwen Frankfurt | 4:0 | Ravensburg Towerstars | 7:0 | 3:1 | 1:0 | 2:1 | - | - | - | (Canada) Peter Quenneville | 80 | Löwen Frankfurt | Tölzer Löwen |
| 2022–23 | Kassel Huskies | 131 | Ravensburg Towerstars | 4:1 | EC Bad Nauheim | 4:2 | 0:3 | 5:2 | 3:1 | 7:3 | - | - | (Germany) Marcel Müller | 70 | - | Heilbronner Falken |
| 2023–24 | Kassel Huskies | 100 | Eisbären Regensburg | 4:2 | Kassel Huskies | 1:2(OT) | 5:1 | 1:3 | 4:2 | 5:2 | 4:2 | - | (United States) Andrew Yogan | 80 | - | Bietigheim Steelers |
| 2024–25 | Kassel Huskies | 101 | Dresdner Eislöwen | 4:3 | Ravensburg Towerstars | 2:4 | 5:1 | 5:2 | 4:0 | 4:7 | 2:4 | 2:1(OT) | (Canada) Max Newton | 69 | Dresdner Eislöwen | Selber Wölfe |
| 2025–26 | Krefeld Pinguine | 114 | Krefeld Pinguine | 4:3 | Kassel Huskies | 3:2(OT) | 1:4 | 5:3 | 2:5 | - | - | - | (Canada) Max Newton | 73 | Krefeld Pinguine | ESV Kaufbeuren |

== League player records ==
The following are the top five all-time leaders in five different statistical categories: matches played; goals; assists; points; penalty minutes

All-time appearances
| # | Name | Pos | MP |
|---|---|---|---|
| 1 | (Germany) Henry Martens | D | 307 |
| 2 | (Germany) Marco Müller | D | 304 |
| 3 | (Germany) Benjamin Hüfner | D | 303 |
| 4 | (Germany) René Schoofs | F | 302 |
| 5 | (Germany) Adriano Carciola | F | 296 |

All-time goals
| # | Name | Pos | Gol |
|---|---|---|---|
| 1 | (Germany) Richard Mueller | F | 166 |
| 2 | (Canada) Matt McKnight | F | 133 |
| 3 | (Canada) Tyler McNeely | F | 123 |
| 4 | (Canada) Marc Sommerfeld | F | 110 |
| 5 | (Germany) Adriano Carciola | F | 105 |

All-time assists
| # | Name | Pos | A |
|---|---|---|---|
| 1 | (Canada) Matt McKnight | F | 257 |
| 2 | (Canada) Marc Sommerfeld | F | 216 |
| 3 | (Canada) Tyler McNeely | F | 215 |
| 4 | (United States) Shawn Weller | F | 194 |
| 5 | (Slovenia) Robin Just | F | 171 |

All-time points
| # | Name | Pos | Pts |
|---|---|---|---|
| 1 | (Canada) Matt McKnight | F | 390 |
| 2 | (Canada) Tyler McNeely | F | 338 |
| 3 | (Canada) Marc Sommerfeld | F | 326 |
| 4 | (Germany) Richard Mueller | F | 295 |
| 5 | (United States) Shawn Weller | F | 292 |

All-time PIM
| # | Name | Pos | PIM |
|---|---|---|---|
| 1 | (Germany) Josef Frank | D | 483 |
| 2 | (Canada) Carter Proft | F | 447 |
| 3 | (Canada) Andrew McPherson | F | 412 |
| 4 | (Germany) Marco Müller | D | 403 |
| 5 | (Germany) Henry Martens | D | 401 |

== See also ==
- List of ice hockey leagues
- 2nd Bundesliga
- Oberliga
