= Löwen Frankfurt =

German ice hockey club from Frankfurt am Main

- City: Frankfurt, Germany
- League: Deutsche Eishockey Liga
- Founded: 2010
- Home arena: Eissporthalle Frankfurt (cap: 6,990)
- Colours: Black, white, orange, silver
- Owner: Stefan Krämer
- General manager: Stefan Krämer (caretaker)
- Head coach: Tom Rowe
- Captain: Reid McNeill
- Website: loewen-frankfurt.de

The Löwen Frankfurt (English: Frankfurt Lions) are a professional ice hockey team based in Frankfurt, Hesse, Germany. They currently play in the Deutsche Eishockey Liga.

The club was founded in 2010 after the Frankfurt Lions had ceased operations. The Frankfurt Lions were a separate professional organisation that competed in the Deutsche Eishockey Liga from 1994 to 2010 and won the German championship in 2004.

Löwen Frankfurt were established independently and began play in the lower divisions of German ice hockey. This club won promotion to the second-tier DEL2 in 2014, and to the DEL itself in 2022.

The Löwen play in the ice rink on Ratsweg. This was opened in 1981 and was long considered one of the most modern halls of its kind in Germany. It consists of 6,990 spectator spots, of which approximately 3,500 are seated and 3,500 standing. Löwen Frankfurt have 41 registered fan clubs.

== Home arena ==
The team's home arena is called Eissporthalle Frankfurt (Eissporthalle am Ratsweg), which holds 6,990 spectators. The arena has been home to Löwen Frankfurt (and earlier to the Frankfurt Lions) since 1991.

== Honours ==
- Deutsche Eishockey Liga
  - (gold) Winners: 2003–04 (as Frankfurt Lions)
- Deutsche Eishockey Liga 2
  - (gold) Winners: 2017, 2022
  - (silver) Runners-up: 2019
- Oberliga West
  - (gold) Winners: 2014
  - (silver) Runners-up: 2013
- Regionalliga West
  - (gold) Winners: 2011

== Players ==
=== Current roster ===
Updated 11 April 2025.

No.	Nat	Player	Pos	S/G	Age	Acquired	Birthplace
83	(Germany)	Kevin Bicker	F	L	21	2023	Schwabach, Germany
24	(Germany)	Philipp Bidoul	D	L	23	2024	Kempten, Germany
86	(Canada)	Cameron Brace	RW	R	33	2023	Toronto, Ontario, Canada
45	(Germany)	Cody Brenner	G	L	30	2024	Bogen, Germany
86	(Canada)	Cameron Brace	RW	R	33	2023	Toronto, Ontario, Canada
8	(Canada)	Nathan Burns	LW/C	L	33	2021	Edmonton, Alberta, Canada
61	(Germany)	Sebastian Cimmerman	F	L	23	2024	Wickede, Germany
71	(Sweden)	Linus Fröberg	C	L	33	2024	Karlstad, Sweden
1	(Germany)	Thomas Greiss	G	L	40	2024	Füssen, Germany
–	(United States)	Michael Joyaux	D	R	29	2025	Bloomingdale, Illinois, United States
18	(Denmark)	Markus Lauridsen	D	L	35	2024	Gentofte, Denmark
26	(Germany)	Dennis Lobach	RW	R	26	2024	Schweinfurt, Germany
52	(Sweden)	Maksim Matushkin	D	L	36	2023	Minsk, Byelorussian SSR, Soviet Union
4	(Canada)	Reid McNeill (C)	D	L	34	2022	London, Ontario, Canada
77	(Germany)	Lua Niehus	D	L	21	2023	Uttendorf, Switzerland
45	(Finland)	Juho Olkinuora	G	L	35	2024	Helsinki, Finland
16	(Germany)	Tommy Pasanen	D	R	24	2025	Schweinfurt, Germany
77	(Germany)	Daniel Pfaffengut	C	R	30	2024	Kaufbeuren, Germany
15	(Germany)	Carter Proft	C	L	31	2024	Spruce Grove, Alberta, Canada
17	(Canada)	Carter Rowney	RW	R	37	2022	Sexsmith, Alberta, Canada
74	(Germany)	Rodion Schumacher	G	L	22	2024	Tayga, Russia
64	(Germany)	Markus Schweiger	F	L	23	2023	Peißenberg, Germany
13	(Germany)	Hannu Tripcke	F	R	20	2024	Mettmann, Germany
84	(United States)	Chris Wilkie	RW	R	30	2024	Omaha, Nebraska, United States
76	(Germany)	Daniel Wirt	D	R	26	2019	Dortmund, Germany

=== Retired numbers ===
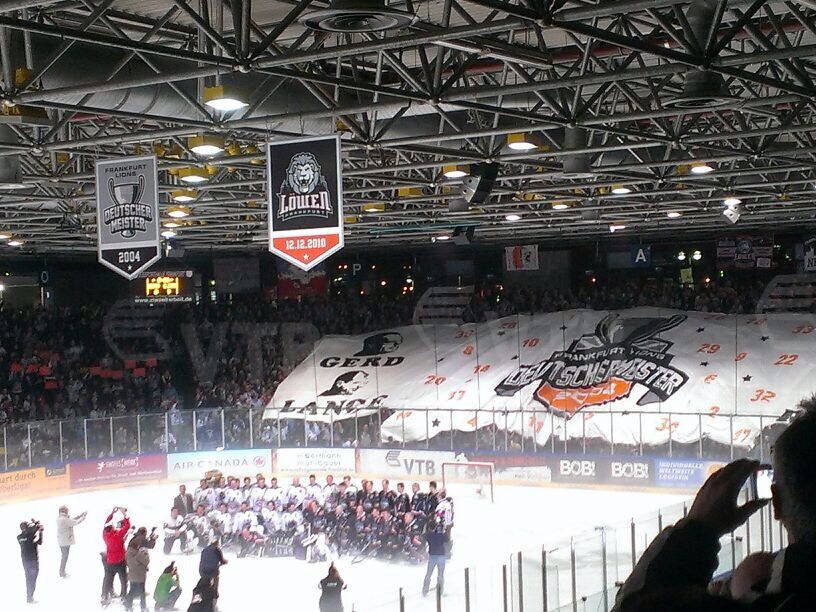
Legends Game in 2014.

Löwen Frankfurt retired numbers
No.	Player	Position	Career in Frankfurt	No. retirement
2	Michael Bresagk	D	1997–2010	February 15, 2014
11	Pat Lebeau	LW	2002–2007	February 15, 2014
27	Trevor Erhardt	F	1983–1988, 1991–1993	February 15, 2014
28	Jason Young	C	2003–2010	February 15, 2014
34	Ian Gordon	G	2003–2010	February 15, 2014

Notes

- Retired jerseys include players who played for Eintracht Frankfurt, ESC Frankfurt and Frankfurt Lions
- Trevor Erhardt’s jersey had already been unofficially retired prior to 2014

== Head coaches ==
The following list shows all head coaches of Löwen Frankfurt.

- Andrej Jaufmann, 2010–2011
- Clayton Beddoes, 2011–2012
- Frank Gentges, 2012–2013
- Tim Kehler, 2013–2015
- Rich Chernomaz, 2015–2016
- István Antal, 2016
- Paul Gardner, 2016–2018
- Matti Tiilikainen, 2018–2020
- Olli Salo, 2020
- Franz-David Fritzmeier, 2020
- Bohuslav Šubr, 2021–2022
- Gerry Fleming, 2022–2023
- Matti Tiilikainen, 2023–2024
- Franz-David Fritzmeier, 2024
- Tom Rowe, 2024–
