= Franz Siegel Stadion =

Arena in Freiburg im Breisgau, Germany

Coordinates: 48°00′31.85″N 7°49′35.83″E

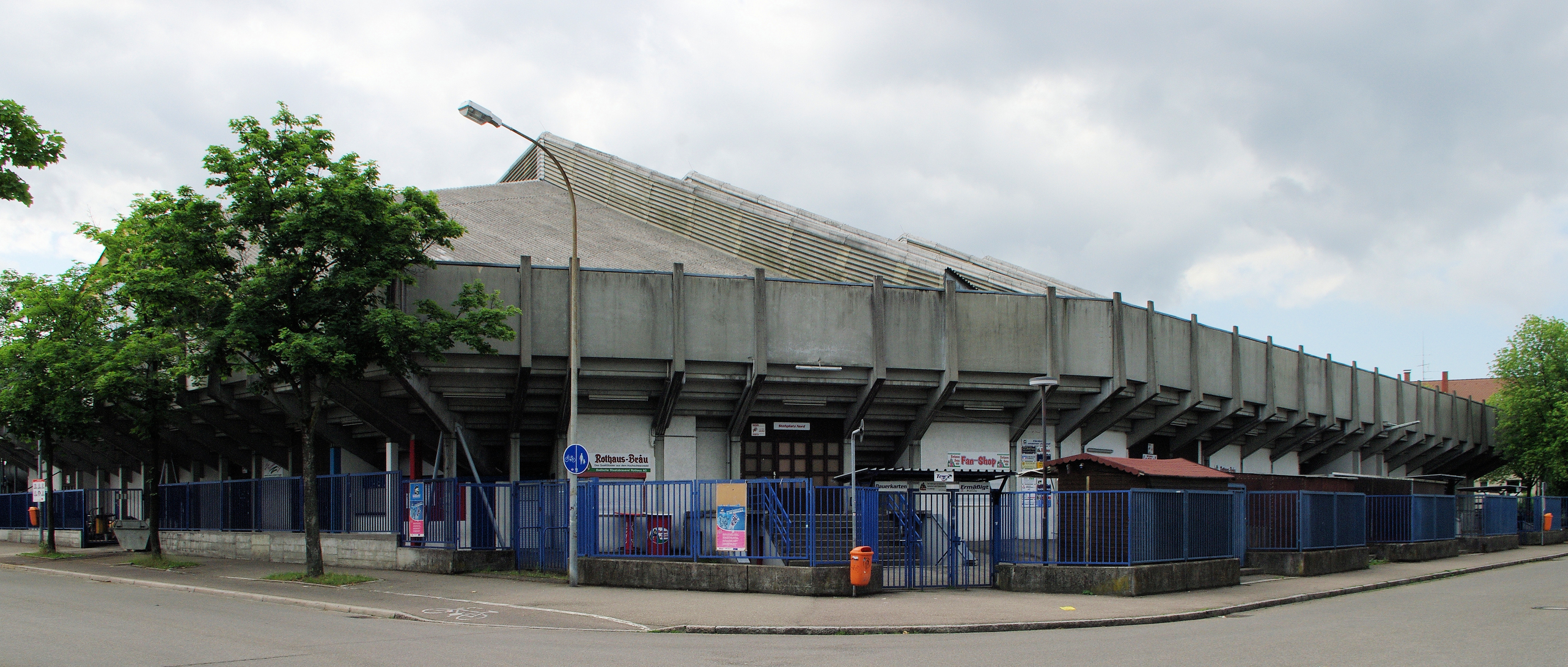
- Interactive map of Franz Siegel Stadion
- Full name: Franz Siegel Stadion
- Location: Freiburg im Breisgau, Germany
- Capacity: 3.500

Construction
- Opened: Late 1960s

Tenant
- Wölfe Freiburg

Franz Siegel Stadion, is an arena in Freiburg im Breisgau, Germany. It is primarily used for ice hockey, and is the home to the EHC Freiburg of the DEL 2. It opened in the late 1960s and holds 5,800 spectators.
