= SC Bietigheim Steelers =

- City: Bietigheim-Bissingen, Germany
- League: DEL2
- Founded: 1981; 45 years ago
- Home arena: EgeTrans Arena (capacity: 4,517)
- Colours: Green, white
- General manager: Volker Schoch
- Head coach: Pekka Kangasalusta
- Captain: Constantin Braun
- Website: steelers.de

Franchise history
- 1981—1988: SC Kornwestheim e.V
- 1988—1991: SC Bietigheim-Bissingen-Kornwestheim e.V
- 1991—2006: SC Bietigheim-Bissingen
- 2006—present: SC Bietigheim Steelers

The SC Bietigheim Steelers, commonly known simply as the Bietigheim Steelers, are a professional ice hockey team based in Bietigheim-Bissingen, Germany. They currently play in DEL2, the second highest-level league in Germany.

== History ==
The club was created as SC Bietigheim-Bissingen-Kornwestheim e.V. in 1988. In 1991, they were renamed SC Bietigheim-Bissingen. In 2000, the club was promoted to the 2nd Bundesliga. They played the next 20 seasons in Germany's second-tiered ice hockey league, the DEL2, before they were promoted to the Deutsche Eishockey Liga for the 2021–22 season.

The Steelers enjoyed a two-year tenure in the top flight DEL before finishing last in the 2022–23 season which sealed relegation to return to the DEL2 for the 2023–24 season on 1 March 2023.

== Honours and achievements ==
- DEB-Pokal champion: 2012, 2013
- 2nd Bundesliga champion: 2009, 2013, 2021
- 2. Liga Süd champion: 1997

== Season-by-season records ==
Tier	Season	Games	Won	OTW	SOW	Tie	OTL	SOL	Lost	Points	Goals for	Goals against	Rank	Playoffs
2	2. Bundesliga 1999–00	50	25	—	—	—	5	—	20	76	190	183	8	Lost in quarterfinals
2	2. Bundesliga 2000–01	44	24	—	—	—	7	—	13	76	173	146	4	Lost in quarterfinals
2	2. Bundesliga 2001–02	52	31	—	—	—	7	—	14	94	207	178	3	Lost in semifinals
2	2. Bundesliga 2002–03	56	36	—	—	—	8	—	12	107	219	182	1	Lost in semifinals
2	2. Bundesliga 2003–04	48	25	2	—	—	2	—	19	81	197	152	6	Lost in semifinals
2	2. Bundesliga 2004–05	52	23	5	—	—	4	—	20	83	183	171	8	Lost in quarterfinals
2	2. Bundesliga 2005–06	52	26	8	—	—	6	—	12	100	180	137	3	Lost in quarterfinals
2	2. Bundesliga 2006–07	52	21	5	—	—	8	—	18	81	156	149	9	No playoffs
2	2. Bundesliga 2007–08	52	22	1	1	—	3	4	21	77	130	129	7	Lost in quarterfinals
2	2. Bundesliga 2008–09	48	32	1	3	—	1	1	10	106	177	97	1	Champions
2	2. Bundesliga 2009–10	52	24	2	5	—	3	3	15	92	150	120	4	Lost in semifinals
2	2. Bundesliga 2010–11	48	14	6	0	—	3	4	21	61	129	159	10	Lost in Pre-Playoffs
2	2. Bundesliga 2011–12	48	15	0	2	—	4	4	23	57	165	177	11	No playoffs/ Relegation
—	Abstiegsrunde 2011–12; Relegation Round	8	4	1	—	—	0	—	3	14	25	17	2	Saved
2	2. Bundesliga 2012–13	48	29	1	1	-	2	4	11	97	181	135	1	Champions

== Players ==
=== Current roster ===
Updated 21 March 2023.

No.	Nat	Player	Pos	S/G	Age	Acquired	Birthplace
74	(Finland)	Sami Aittokallio	G	L	34	2021	Tampere, Finland
59	(Canada)	Josh Atkinson	D	L	33	2022	St. Albert, Alberta, Canada
4	(Canada)	Arvin Atwal	D	R	30	2023	Surrey, British Columbia, Canada
90	(Germany)	Constantin Braun (C)	D	L	38	2021	Lampertheim, Germany
51	(Germany)	Cody Brenner	G	L	29	2019	Bogen, Germany
70	(Germany)	Leon Doubrawa	G	L	25	2020	Ebersberg, Germany
58	(Germany)	Lucas Flade	D	R	25	2022	Schkeuditz, Germany
26	(Canada)	Evan Jasper	F	L	34	2020	Whitby, Ontario, Canada
71	(Finland)	Michael Keranen	LW	L	36	2022	Stockholm, Sweden
15	(Germany)	Robert Kneisler	F	L	25	2018	Herrenberg, Germany
42	(Germany)	Fabjon Kuqi	F	L	25	2018	München, Germany
75	(Finland)	Teemu Lepaus	LW	L	33	2022	Tampere, Finland
34	(Germany)	Elias Lindner	F	L	25	2022	Mainburg, Germany
18	(Canada)	Mathew Maione (A)	D	L	35	2022	Toronto, Ontario, Canada
23	(Germany)	Jimmy Martinovic	D	L	24	2021	Füssen, Germany
8	(Germany)	Guillaume Naud	D	R	33	2021	Augsburg, Germany
29	(Germany)	Alexander Preibisch (A)	RW	R	35	2017	Köln, Germany
3	(Germany)	Max Prommersberger	D	L	38	2014	Bad Tölz, Germany
12	(United States)	C. J. Stretch	C	R	37	2020	Irvine, California, United States
84	(United States)	Chris Wilkie	RW	R	30	2022	Omaha, Nebraska, United States
14	(Germany)	Benjamin Zientek	LW	L	32	2016	Augsburg, Germany

== Coaching history ==
- Richard Piasecki, 1989–1990
- Danilo Valenti, 1990–1991
- Richard Piasecki, 1991–1992
- Jan Mancar, 1992–1993
- Petteri Lehmussaari, 1993–1995
- Wolfgang Rosenberg, 1995–1996
- Petteri Lehmussaari, 1996–1997
- Doug Kacharvich, 1997–1998
- Tom Pokel, 1998–2001
- Gary Prior, 2001–2002
- Daniel Naud, 2002–2004
- Uli Liebsch, 2004–2006
- Michael Komma, 2006–2007
- Christian Brittig, 2007–2010
- Danny Held, 2010–2011
- Kevin Gaudet, 2011–2018
- Daniel Naud, 2018–2022
- Pekka Kangasalusta, 2022–Present
