= Kolbenschmidt Arena =

Arena in Heilbronn, Germany

Coordinates: 49°08′46″N 9°12′55″E

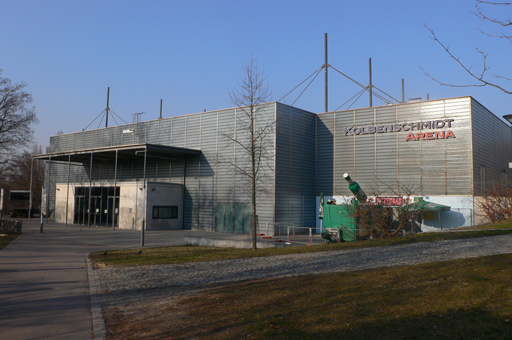
- Interactive map of Kolbenschmidt Arena
- Former names: Knorr Arena (2002–2007); Lavatec Arena (2007–2009); Eisstadion Heilbronn (2009–2012)
- Location: Heilbronn, Germany
- Owner: Stadt Heilbronn
- Operator: Heilbronner Falken GmbH
- Capacity: 4.000

Construction
- Groundbreaking: January, 2002
- Opened: November, 2002
- Cost: € 8,2 million
- Architect: Jürgen Pils

Tenants
- Heilbronner Falken (2002-); Eisbären Heilbronn (2005-)

Kolbenschmidt Arena is an arena in Heilbronn, Germany. It is primarily used for hockey. Kolbenschmidt Arena opened in 2002 and has a viewer capacity of 4,000.
