= Eisstadion im Sahnpark =

Ice hockey arena in Crimmitschau, Germany

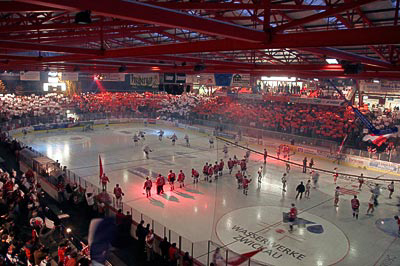
- Interactive map of Eisstadion im Sahnpark
- Full name: Eisstadion im Sahnpark
- Location: Crimmitschau, Germany
- Coordinates: 50°49′36″N 12°22′36″E
- Capacity: 5,222

Construction
- Opened: October 1964

Tenant
- ETC Crimmitschau

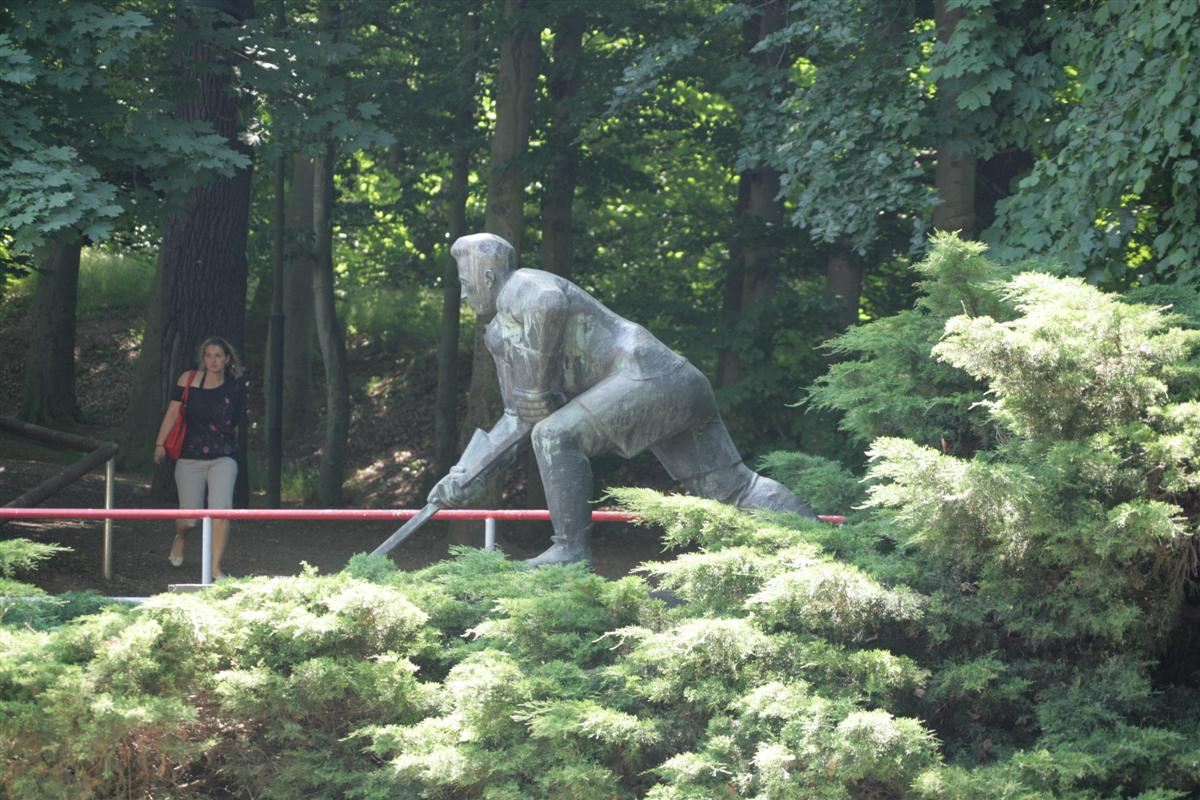
The pioneer of the sport of ice hockey in the Leipzig region, Horst cutter, as a bronze sculpture at the entrance of the ice rink

Eisstadion im Sahnpark, is an arena in Crimmitschau, Germany. It is primarily used for ice hockey, and is the home to the ETC Crimmitschau of the 2nd Bundesliga. It opened in 1964 and holds 5,222 spectators.

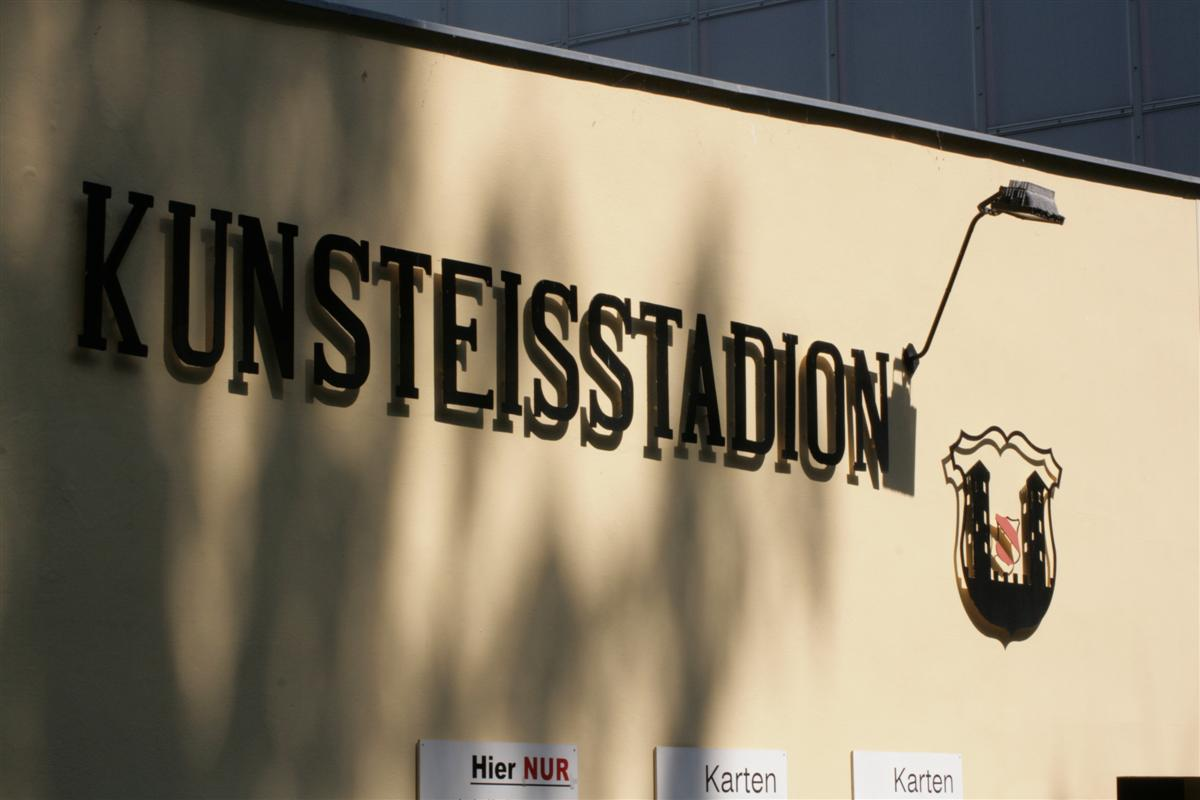
