= Selber Wölfe =

- City: Selb, Germany
- League: DEL2
- Founded: 1953
- Home arena: NETZSCH Arena (capacity: 3,983)
- Colors: Blue, White, Red
- General manager: Jürgen Golly; Thomas Manzei
- Head coach: Craig Streu
- Website: Official website

The Selber Wölfe is an ice hockey team based in Selb, Bavaria, Germany. The team currently plays in the DEL2, the second-highest level of ice hockey in Germany. Founded in 1953, the team plays at the NETZSCH Arena.

== Honours ==
As of March 2024

- Oberliga Süd

Champions: 2013/2014, 2021/2022
