= EHC Freiburg =

- Nickname: Wölfe (Wolves)
- City: Freiburg im Breisgau, Germany
- League: DEL 2
- Founded: 1984
- Home arena: Franz Siegel Stadion
- Colors
- Head coach: (Germany) Robert Hoffmann
- Captain: Philip Rießle
- Website: www.ehcf.de

EHC Wölfe Freiburg or EHC Freiburg is a professional ice hockey team based in Freiburg im Breisgau, Germany. They play in the DEL 2, the second-highest level of ice hockey in Germany.

== History ==
The club was created as EHC Freiburg in 1984. In 2003, they became champion of the 2nd Bundesliga and earned the right to play in the Deutsche Eishockey Liga in 2003–04 season. The organization was spun off to Die wölfe Eishockeyveranstaltungs GmbH and was renamed Wölfe Freiburg, while the other teams of the club remained at EHC Freiburg e.V. Wölfe Freiburg finished in last place in its only DEL season and was relegated back to the 2nd Bundesliga.

Wölfe Freiburg then bounced between the 2nd Bundesliga and the Oberliga for several seasons. In 2006, Die wölfe Eishockeyveranstaltungs GmbH declared bankruptcy and Wölfe Freiburg GmbH was established the following year.

The team was relegated down to the Regionalliga, the fourth tier of ice hockey in Germany, after Wölfe Freiburg GmbH went bankrupt in the spring of 2011. For 2011–12, the team was once again dubbed as EHC Freiburg (while keeping the Wölfe emblem) and won all 21 of its regular season games, en route to the Regionalliga championship and a promotion once again to the Oberliga. In the Season 2014–2015 the team became champion of the Oberliga and played the following season in the DEL 2.

In May 2019, it was announced that Peter Russell had left the Glasgow Clan, and would be joining EHC Freiburg in the DEL2, taking over from Jan Melichar.

== Bibliography ==
- Karlin, Werner & Bersch, Dirk (2002). Eishockey in Freiburg. Freiburg: Sutton Verlag Gmbh. ISBN 3-89702-507-8.
