= Ravensburg Towerstars =

- City: Ravensburg, Germany
- League: DEL2
- Founded: 1881
- Home arena: Eissporthalle Ravensburg
- Colours: Blue, white
- General manager: Rainer Schan
- Head coach: Gergely Majoross
- Captain: Vincenz Mayer
- Website: www.towerstars.de

Franchise history
- 1881–1932: Eislaufverein Ravensburg
- 1932–1968: ERV Ravensburg
- 1968–2007: EV Ravensburg
- 2007–2010: EVR Tower Stars
- 2010–present: Ravensburg Towerstars

The Ravensburg Towerstars are a professional ice hockey team based in Ravensburg, Germany, and one of the oldest clubs in the country. They currently play in DEL2, the second level of ice hockey in Germany.

Prior to the 2013–14 season they played in the 2nd Bundesliga. They finished the 2011 season first, becoming champions of the 2nd Bundesliga. However, as there was at the time no promotion and relegation between 2nd Bundesliga and the highest German ice hockey league, the DEL, the Ravensburg Towerstars were not promoted following their success.

Until 2007 they played in the Oberliga.

== Achievements ==
- Oberliga champion : 1967, 2007
- 2nd Bundesliga champion: 2010/11, 2018/19, 2022/23
