= Heilbronner Falken =

- City: Heilbronn, Germany
- League: DEL2
- Founded: 1980
- Home arena: Kolbenschmidt Arena (capacity: 4,000)
- Colours: Blue, white, red
- General manager: Attila Eren
- Head coach: Alexander Mellitzer
- Captain: Derek Damon
- Website: www.heilbronner-falken.de

Franchise history
- 1980–1986: REV Heilbronn
- 1986–2003: Heilbronner EC
- 2003–present: Heilbronner Falken

The Heilbronner Falken (German: [haɪlˈbʁɔnɐ ˈfalkŋ̍]; 'Heilbronn Falcons') are a professional ice hockey team based in Heilbronn, Germany. They currently play in DEL2, the second level of ice hockey in Germany. Prior to the 2013–14 season they played in the 2nd Bundesliga.

== History ==
The club was founded as Heilbronner EC in 1986. They were renamed Heilbronner Falken two years later, in 1988. In 2007, the club was promoted to the 2nd Bundesliga by virtue of winning the Oberliga.

== Current team ==
Number	Nationality	Name	Date of birth	Birthplace	On the team since	Last team
1	German	Luca Ganz	April 21, 2003	Kaufbeuren, GER	2020	Jungadler Mannheim
3	German	Matthias Nemec	August 31, 1990	Opava, CZE	2019	Ravensburg Towerstars
4	German	Brock Maschmeyer	July 31, 1992	Bruderheim, CAN	2018	Eispiraten Crimmitschau
5	German	Moritz Wirth	June 10, 1999	Frankfurt, GER	2019	Bayreuth Tigers
6	German	Kevin Maginot	July 25, 1994	Mannheim, GER	2019	Löwen Frankfurt
7	German	Jan Pavlu	July 16, 1994	Bolzano, ITA	2018	Bayreuth Tigers
7	Canadian/German	Justin Kirsch	April 11, 1992	Chilliwack, CAN	2020	Kassel Huskies

Officials
Position		Name	Date of birth	Birthplace	On the team since	last team
Coach	Austria	Alexander Mellitzer	February 5, 1980	Klagenfurt, Austria	2018	Austria U20

== Achievements ==
- Oberliga champion: 2007
