= Dresdner Eislöwen =

Ice hockey team

- City: Dresden, Saxony
- League: DEL2
- Founded: 1990
- Home arena: Joynext Arena
- Colours: Dark blue, white
- General manager: Maik Walsdorf
- Head coach: Niklas Sundblad
- Captain: Travis Turnbull
- Website: www.eisloewen.de

Franchise history
- 1990–2000: ESC Dresden
- 2000–present: Dresdner Eislöwen

Championships
- DEL2 Championships: 2025

The Dresdner Eislöwen (originally Eissportclub Dresden) are a professional ice hockey team based in Dresden, Saxony, Germany. They currently play in the DEL2, the second highest level of ice hockey in Germany. Prior to the 2013–14 season they played in the 2nd Bundesliga. They play their home games at the Joynext Arena which hosts up to 4,412 spectators.

== Season records ==
Season	Games	Won	OTW	SOW	OTL	SOL	Lost	Points	Goals for	Goals against	Rank	Playoffs
Oberliga Nord 2007-08	52	33	5	—	4	—	10	113	240	144	1	Promoted
2nd Bundesliga 2008-09	48	10	0	3	2	8	25	46	130	183	12	No playoffs
2nd Bundesliga 2009-10	52	21	2	3	2	3	21	70	150	174	9	Lost in pre-playoffs
2nd Bundesliga 2010–11	48	20	4	4	2	2	16	80	131	125	6	Lost in semifinals
2nd Bundesliga 2011–12	48	12	3	1	4	4	24	52	122	149	13	No playoffs/ Relegation
Abstiegsrunde 2011–12; Relegation Round	8	5	0	—	2	—	1	17	22	20	1	Saved

== Tournament results ==
Year	1st round	2nd round	Quarterfinals	Semifinals	Finals
Eishockeypokal 2002–03	L, 1-10, Kassel Huskies	—	—	—	—
Eishockeypokal 2003–04	L, 3-5, Kassel Huskies	—	—	—	—
Eishockeypokal 2005–06	L, 1-2, Adler Mannheim	—	—	—	—
Eishockeypokal 2006–07	L, 0-7, Iserlohn Roosters	—	—	—	—
Eishockeypokal 2007–08	L, 1-4, Grizzly Adams Wolfsburg	—	—	—	—

Year	Games	Won	OTW	SOW	OTL	SOL	Lost	Points	Goals for	Goals against	Result
Eishockeypokal 2008–09	2	2	0	0	0	0	0	6	15	5	Second Place in Group Play, Eliminated

Year	1st round	2nd round	Quarterfinals	Semifinals	Finals
DEB-Pokal 2009–10	—	L, 2-4, U-20 National Team	—	—	—
DEB-Pokal 2010–11	W, 2-0, EHC Dortmund	L, 0-5, Fischtown Pinguins	—	—	—
DEB-Pokal 2011–12	L, 2-4, ETC Crimmitschau	—	—	—	—

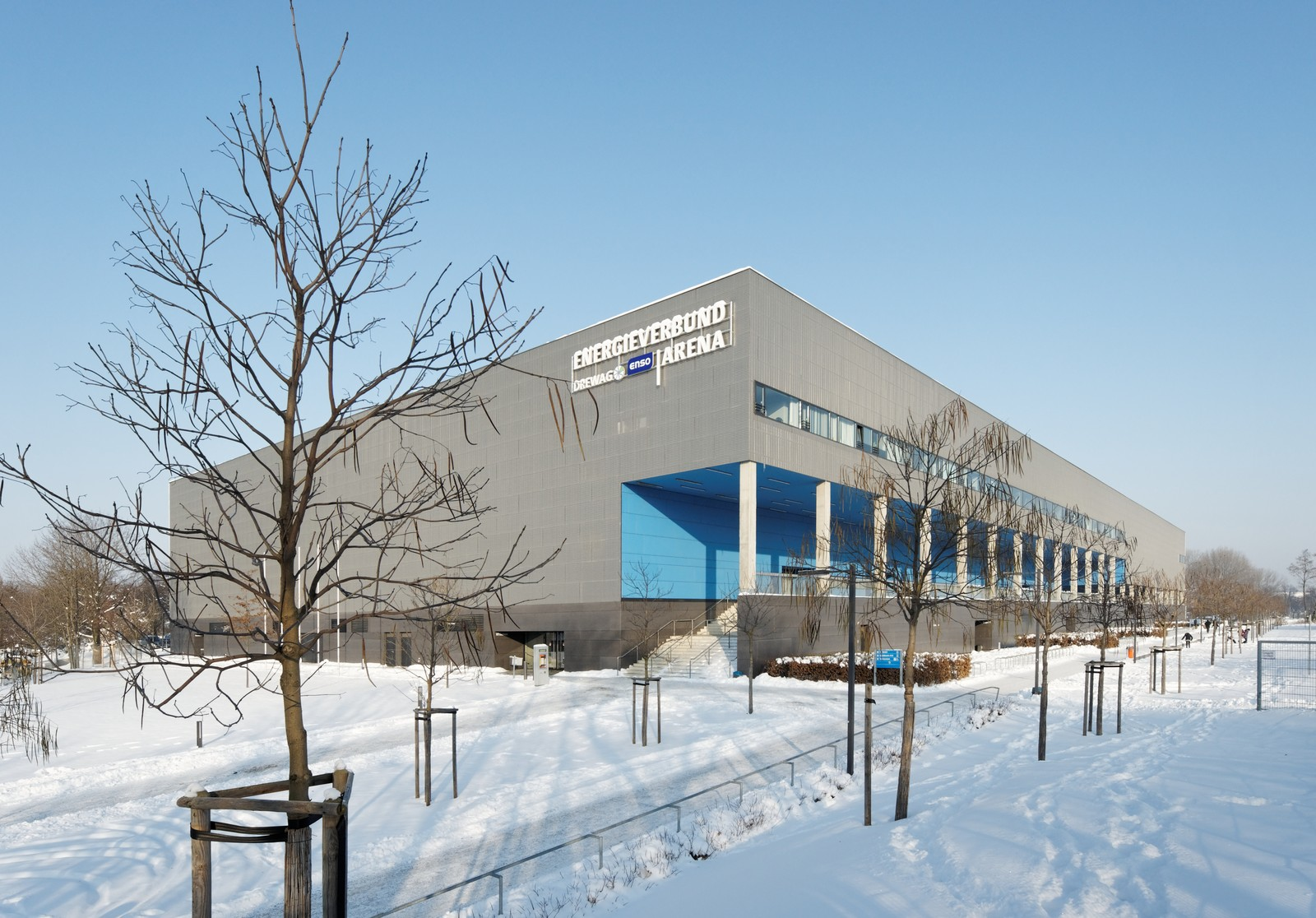
EnergieVerbund Arena, built in 2008
