= Eispiraten Crimmitschau =

ETC Crimmitschau
- City: Crimmitschau, Germany
- League: DEL2
- Founded: 1990
- Home arena: Eisstadion im Sahnpark (cap: 5,222)
- Colours: Red, white, black
- General manager: Jörg Buschmann
- Head coach: Daniel Naud
- Captain: Adrian Grygiel
- Website: www.eispiraten-crimmitschau.de

Franchise history
- 1927: EHC Crimmitschau
- 1939: ETC Crimmitschau
- 2007: Eispiraten Crimmitschau

Eispiraten Crimmitschau is an ice hockey team in Crimmitschau, Germany. They currently play in DEL2, the second level of ice hockey in Germany. Prior to the 2013–14 season they played in the 2nd Bundesliga league. The team is the top squad of the ETC Crimmitschau club. The team is currently owned by tech entrepreneur Zain Zaidi

The club was founded in 1990. They were promoted to the 2nd Bundesliga in 2000.

== Season records ==
Season	Games	Won	OTW	SOW	OTL	SOL	Lost	Points	Goals for	Goals against	Rank	Playoffs
2nd Bundesliga 2007-08	52	19	4	1	1	6	21	74	125	140	8	Lost in quarterfinals
2nd Bundesliga 2008-09	48	8	0	4	1	2	33	35	117	208	13	No playoffs
2nd Bundesliga 2009-10	52	11	0	7	1	4	29	52	129	177	12	No playoffs/ Relegation
Abstiegsrunde 2009–10; Relegation Round	Defeated Hannover Indians 4 games to 1											Saved
2nd Bundesliga 2010–11	48	11	2	1	3	1	30	43	130	180	12	No playoffs/ Relegation
Abstiegsrunde 2010–11; Relegation Round	8	2	2	—	3	—	1	13	29	26	2	Saved
2nd Bundesliga 2011–12	48	18	2	2	1	1	24	64	141	146	10	No playoffs/ Relegation
Abstiegsrunde 2011–12; Relegation Round	8	3	1	—	0	—	4	11	17	15	3	Saved

== Tournament results ==
Year	1st round	2nd round	Quarterfinals	Semifinals	Finals
Eishockeypokal 2002–03	L, 2–5, Eisbären Berlin	—	—	—	—
Eishockeypokal 2003–04	L, 3–6, Hamburg Freezers	—	—	—	—
Eishockeypokal 2004–05	L, 1–2, Kassel Huskies	—	—	—	—
Eishockeypokal 2005–06	L, 1–3, ERC Ingolstadt	—	—	—	—
Eishockeypokal 2006–07	L, 2–6, Straubing Tigers	—	—	—	—
Eishockeypokal 2007–08	L, 2–3, Frankfurt Lions	—	—	—	—

Year	Games	Won	OTW	SOW	OTL	SOL	Lost	Points	Goals for	Goals against	Result
Eishockeypokal 2008–09	2	0	0	0	0	0	2	0	5	9	Third Place in Group Play, Eliminated

Year	1st round	2nd round	Quarterfinals	Semifinals	Finals
DEB-Pokal 2009–10	—	W, 5–0, Lausitzer Füchse	L, 2–4, Fischtown Pinguins	—	—
DEB-Pokal 2010–11	W, 5–4, EV Füssen	W, 6–5, SERC Wild Wings	L, 1–4, U-20 National Team	—	—
DEB-Pokal 2011–12	W, 4–2, Dresdner Eislöwen	L, 3–7, Fischtown Pinguins	—	—	—

== Achievements ==
- Oberliga champion : 1995, 2000.

== Current roster ==
2013–14 Season
No.	Nat.	Name	Birth date	Birthplace
Goaltenders (Torhüter)
30	(Germany)	Sebastian Albrecht	12 April 1990 (age 36)	Berlin, Germany
31	(Germany)	Peter Holmgren	14 May 1987 (age 39)	Gothenburg, Sweden
Defenders (Verteidiger)
2	(Germany)	Florian Kirschbauer	28 July 1988 (age 38)	Munich, Germany
3	(Canada)	T.J. Fast	2 September 1987 (age 38)	Calgary, Canada
5	(Germany)	Benjamin Hüfner	7 January 1991 (age 35)	Berlin, Germany
13	(Germany)	André Schietzold	11 January 1987 (age 39)	Werdau, Germany
14	(Germany)	Martin Heider	17 August 1986 (age 39)	Opava, Czech Republic
16	(Germany)	Robin Thomson	23 July 1989 (age 37)	Hannover, Germany
58	(Germany)	Jan Tramm	20 September 1995 (age 30)	Hamburg, Germany
63	(Germany)	Maximilian Faber	18 May 1993 (age 33)	Hagen, Germany
Forwards (Stürmer)
8	(Germany)	Dominic Walsh	18 July 1989 (age 37)	Guildford, United Kingdom
9	(Canada)	Scott Pitt	25 January 1988 (age 38)	Ottawa, Canada
15	(Germany)	Benjamin Kronawitter	5 March 1991 (age 35)	Garmisch-Partenkirchen, Germany
17	(Canada)	Harrison Reed	18 January 1988 (age 38)	Newmarket, Canada
18	(Germany)	Michael Galvez	10 September 1995 (age 30)	Werdau, Germany
19	(Germany)	Philipp Gunkel	11 July 1988 (age 38)	Friedrichroda, Germany
22	(Canada)	Cameron Keith	22 December 1980 (age 45)	Nelson, Canada
23	(Germany)	Martin Heinisch	6 April 1985 (age 41)	Most, Czech Republic
26	(Germany)	Daniel Bucheli	26 October 1988 (age 37)	Rosenheim, Germany
32	(Germany)	Matthias Forster	26 April 1985 (age 41)	Bobingen, Germany
88	(Canada)	Max Campbell	21 December 1988 (age 37)	Strathroy, Canada
94	(Ukraine)	Valeriy Guts	8 April 1994 (age 32)	Kharkiv, Ukraine
