= Elwing (disambiguation) =

Elwing is a character in J. R. R. Tolkien's universe.

Elwing may also refer to:

- Sebastian Elwing, German ice hockey goaltender
- Elwing (band), Greek metal band
- HMAS Elwing, Australian vessel

== See also ==
- Elwingen, German exonym for Elvange, Moselle, France
