= Manuel Klinge =

German ice hockey player

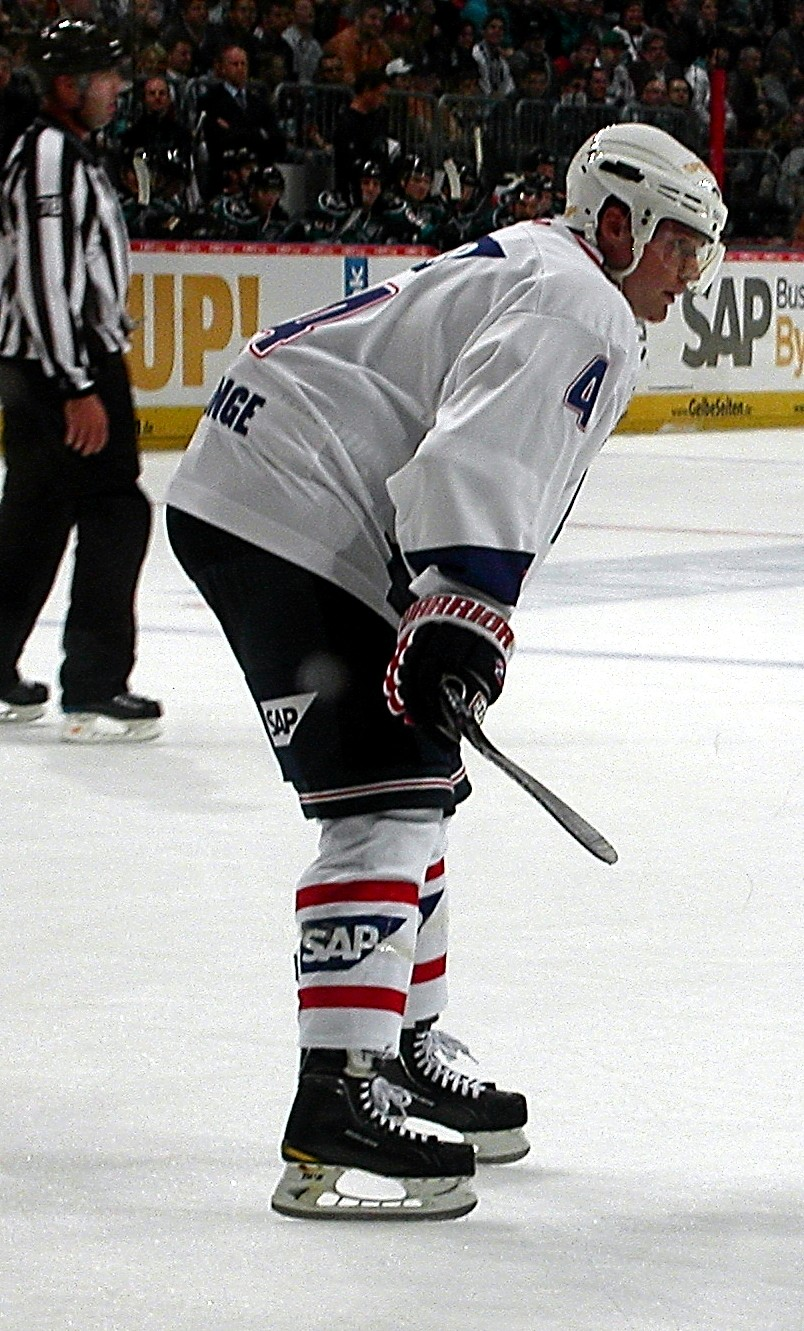
- Born: September 5, 1984 (age 40); Kassel, West Germany
- Height: 6 ft 1 in (185 cm)
- Weight: 201 lb (91 kg; 14 st 5 lb)
- Position: Right wing
- Shot: Right
- DEL2 team Former teams: Kassel Huskies; Adler Mannheim
- National team: Germany
- Playing career: 2003–2018

Manuel Klinge (born 5 September 1984) is a German professional ice hockey right wing currently playing for Kassel Huskies of the DEL2. Klinge started playing for his hometown team the Kassel Huskies, making his professional debut with the team in 2003 and stayed with the team until they went bankrupt in 2010. He then joined DEL top team Adler Mannheim. After just one season, he surprisingly moved back to Kassel, now in the third division, starting an apprenticeship next to playing ice hockey.

Klinge played for the German national team at the 2010 Winter Olympics.

== Career statistics ==
=== Regular season and playoffs ===
			Regular season					Playoffs
Season	Team	League	GP	G	A	Pts	PIM	GP	G	A	Pts	PIM
1999–2000	Kassel Huskies	GER.3 U18	14	49	33	82	24	—	—	—	—	—
2000–01	Kassel Huskies	GER.3 U18	17	55	61	116	30	—	—	—	—	—
2001–02	EJ Kassel II	GER.5	36	62	55	117	38	7	10	2	12	14
2002–03	Kassel Huskies	GER.2 U20	14	63	34	97	18	—	—	—	—	—
2003–04	Kassel Huskies	GER U20	13	33	17	50	6	—	—	—	—	—
2003–04	Kassel Huskies	DEL	3	0	0	0	0	—	—	—	—	—
2004–05	Kassel Huskies	GER U20	5	13	12	25	18	—	—	—	—	—
2004–05	Kassel Huskies	DEL	35	0	0	0	2	—	—	—	—	—
2005–06	Kassel Huskies	DEL	52	4	1	5	2	—	—	—	—	—
2005–06	ETC Crimmitschau	GER.3	11	8	0	8	10	6	5	2	7	8
2006–07	Kassel Huskies	GER.2	51	31	32	63	20	10	5	10	15	4
2007–08	Kassel Huskies	GER.2	44	16	17	33	26	15	5	5	10	20
2008–09	Kassel Huskies	DEL	31	10	14	24	8	—	—	—	—	—
2009–10	Kassel Huskies	DEL	55	19	18	37	32	—	—	—	—	—
2010–11	Adler Mannheim	DEL	45	2	14	16	14	6	1	1	2	0
2011–12	EC Kassel Huskies	GER.3	32	45	49	94	36	6	8	1	9	12
2012–13	EC Kassel Huskies	GER.3	34	39	65	104	37	19	9	22	31	12
2013–14	EC Kassel Huskies	GER.3	34	26	39	65	65	18	15	21	36	6
2014–15	EC Kassel Huskies	DEL2	43	19	19	38	16	5	0	0	0	2
2015–16	EC Kassel Huskies	DEL2	49	12	29	41	16	14	9	7	16	8
2016–17	EC Kassel Huskies	DEL2	43	19	31	50	14	9	4	8	12	20
2017–18	EC Kassel Huskies	DEL2	8	4	7	11	2	—	—	—	—	—
GER.2/DEL2 totals			238	101	135	236	94	53	23	30	53	54
DEL totals			221	35	47	82	58	6	1	1	2	0

=== International ===
Year	Team	Event	GP	G	A	Pts	PIM
2009	Germany	OGQ	3	1	1	2	2
2010	Germany	OG	4	1	0	1	0
Senior totals			7	2	1	3	2
