= Jürgen Rumrich =

German ice hockey player

Personal information
- Nationality: German
- Born: 20 March 1968 (age 57); Miesbach, West Germany

Sport
- Sport: Ice hockey

Jürgen Rumrich (born 20 March 1968) is a German former ice hockey player. He competed in the men's tournaments at the 1992 Winter Olympics, the 1998 Winter Olympics and the 2002 Winter Olympics.

== Career statistics ==
=== Regular season and playoffs ===
			Regular season					Playoffs
Season	Team	League	GP	G	A	Pts	PIM	GP	G	A	Pts	PIM
1984–85	Sportbund DJK Rosenheim	FRG U20	—	—	—	—	—	—	—	—	—	—
1985–86	Sportbund DJK Rosenheim	FRG U20	—	—	—	—	—	—	—	—	—	—
1986–87	EHC Freiburg	FRG.2	33	5	7	12	12	14	5	8	13	4
1987–88	EHC Freiburg	FRG.2	34	16	9	25	26	18	7	11	18	11
1988–89	EHC Freiburg	1.GBun	35	6	9	15	22	—	—	—	—	—
1989–90	EHC Freiburg	1.GBun	33	16	8	24	26	—	—	—	—	—
1990–91	BSC Preussen	1.GBun	43	9	12	21	10	10	1	2	3	0
1991–92	BSC Preussen	1.GBun	43	13	16	29	24	7	1	3	4	4
1992–93	BSC Preussen	1.GBun	44	12	7	19	27	7	4	3	7	4
1993–94	BSC Preussen	1.GBun	44	14	13	27	4	10	3	4	7	27
1994–95	BSC Preussen	DEL	44	25	15	40	16	12	6	3	9	2
1995–96	Preussen Devils	DEL	50	25	18	43	12	11	4	6	10	0
1996–97	Berlin Capitals	DEL	50	12	13	25	18	4	2	0	2	8
1997–98	Berlin Capitals	DEL	39	9	7	16	10	4	0	0	0	12
1998–99	Kassel Huskies	DEL	52	13	22	35	26	—	—	—	—	—
1999–2000	Kassel Huskies	DEL	54	9	20	29	32	8	1	1	2	6
2000–01	Nürnberg Ice Tigers	DEL	58	9	16	25	36	4	1	1	2	0
2001–02	Nürnberg Ice Tigers	DEL	58	15	11	26	32	4	1	0	1	2
2002–03	Nürnberg Ice Tigers	DEL	46	5	7	12	12	5	4	0	4	4
2003–04	Nürnberg Ice Tigers	DEL	50	8	7	15	32	6	0	1	1	6
2004–05	Hamburg Freezers	DEL	35	4	8	12	10	—	—	—	—	—
1.GBun totals			242	70	65	135	113	34	9	12	21	35
DEL totals			536	134	144	278	236	58	19	12	31	40

=== International ===
Year	Team	Event	GP	G	A	Pts	PIM
1986	West Germany	EJC	5	0	2	2	0
1987	West Germany	WJC B	5	2	3	5	8
1988	West Germany	WJC	7	0	0	0	2
1992	Germany	OLY	8	1	1	2	2
1992	Germany	WC	5	0	1	1	0
1996	Germany	WC	6	0	2	2	0
1996	Germany	WCH	4	1	0	1	2
1997	Germany	OGQ	3	0	0	0	0
1997	Germany	WC	8	0	1	1	0
1998	Germany	OLY	4	0	0	0	0
1998	Germany	WC	6	2	0	2	0
1999	Germany	WC B	7	3	3	6	2
2000	Germany	OGQ	3	3	1	4	0
2000	Germany	WC B	4	1	0	1	0
2001	Germany	OGQ	3	0	0	0	0
2001	Germany	WC	7	0	0	0	2
2002	Germany	OLY	7	1	0	1	0
2002	Germany	WC	7	2	0	2	2
Junior totals			17	2	5	7	10
Senior totals			82	14	9	23	10

"Jurgen Rumrich". Elite Prospects.
