= 2013–14 DEL2 season =

- League: DEL2
- Sport: Ice Hockey
- Number of teams: 12

Regular season
- Season champions: Fischtown Pinguins

Finals
- Champions: Fischtown Pinguins

DEL2 seasons
- 2014–15 →

The 2013–14 DEL2 season was the first season of operation for the DEL2 (also known as DEL II). Replacing the 2nd Bundesliga, this league represents the second-level of ice hockey in Germany, below the Deutsche Eishockey Liga (DEL). The league operated with 12 teams during the 2013–14 season. The inaugural champions were the Fischtown Pinguins.

== Regular season ==
In its inaugural season the league competed with 12 clubs which was extended to 14 in the following season.

Pos	Team	Pld	W	OTW	OTL	L	GF	GA	GD	Pts	Qualification
1	Fischtown Pinguins (C)	54	28	6	8	12	185	143	+42	104	Advanced to playoffs
2	Starbulls Rosenheim	54	29	5	6	14	183	141	+42	103	Advanced to playoffs
3	Bietigheim Steelers	54	29	2	10	13	223	167	+56	101	Advanced to playoffs
4	Ravensburg Towerstars	54	26	7	5	16	193	166	+27	97	Advanced to playoffs
5	EV Landshut	54	28	4	4	18	206	163	+43	96	Advanced to playoffs
6	SC Riessersee	54	25	6	3	20	158	141	+17	90	Advanced to playoffs
7	Dresdner Eislöwen	54	22	5	8	19	166	158	+8	84	Advanced to playoffs
8	Lausitzer Füchse	54	21	1	4	28	147	170	−23	69	Advanced to playoffs
9	EC Bad Nauheim	54	16	6	3	29	161	200	−39	63	Advanced to play-downs
10	ESV Kaufbeuren	54	17	3	2	32	157	226	−69	59	Advanced to play-downs
11	Heilbronner Falken	54	15	4	4	31	140	191	−51	57	Advanced to play-downs
12	Eispiraten Crimmitschau	54	10	9	1	34	166	208	−42	49	Advanced to play-downs

Source: kicker.de
Rules for classification: 1) points; 2) head-to-head points; 3) head-to-head goal difference; 4) head-to-head number of goals scored.
(C) Champion

== Playoffs ==
=== Championship ===
The championship play-offs:

Quarterfinals
1	Fischtown Pinguins	4
8	Lausitzer Füchse	1
4	Ravensburg Towerstars	3
5	EV Landshut	4
2	Starbulls Rosenheim	4
7	Dresdner Eislöwen	1
3	Bietigheim Steelers	4
6	SC Riessersee	1

Semifinals
1	Fischtown Pinguins	4
5	EV Landshut	3
2	Starbulls Rosenheim	2
3	Bietigheim Steelers	4

Finals
1	Fischtown Pinguins	4
3	Bietigheim Steelers	1

=== Relegation ===
In the relegation round the four bottom placed clubs played a best-of-seven knock-out series first in which EC Bad Nauheim defeated Eispiraten Crimmitschau and Heilbronner Falken the ESV Kaufbeuren. Following this the two losers entered another round with the best four Oberliga clubs, playing a home-and-away round. The two DEL2 clubs retained their league place while EC Kassel Huskies and Löwen Frankfurt won promotion. The other two Oberliga clubs, EHC Freiburg and VER Selb, remained at this level.
