= Brad Snetsinger =

Canadian ice hockey player

Bradley Snetsinger
- Born: April 8, 1987 (age 38) Ajax, Ontario, Canada
- Height: 6 ft 2 in (188 cm)
- Weight: 190 lb (86 kg; 13 st 8 lb)
- Position: Left wing
- Shoots: Left
- Oberliga (ice hockey) team: Herner EV Miners
- NHL draft: Undrafted
- Playing career: 2008–present

Bradley Snetsinger (born April 8, 1987) is a Canadian professional ice hockey player who is currently playing for the Herner EV Miners in the German Oberliga (ice hockey).

== Career statistics ==
=== Regular season and playoffs ===
			Regular season					Playoffs
Season	Team	League	GP	G	A	Pts	PIM	GP	G	A	Pts	PIM
2003-04	Mississauga IceDogs	OHL	8	2	1	3	2	1	0	0	0	0
2003-04	Milton Icehawks	OPJHL	40	40	52	92	30
2004-05	Mississauga IceDogs	OHL	54	8	5	13	30	5	0	0	0	0
2005-06	Windsor Spitfires	OHL	60	29	15	44	29	7	2	3	5	8
2006-07	Windsor Spitfires	OHL	63	29	33	62	86
2007-08	Windsor Spitfires	OHL	68	50	52	102	45	2	0	0	0	5
2008-09	Lowell Devils	AHL	8	5	7	6
2008-09	Trenton Devils	ECHL	49	32	28	60	22
2009-10	Lowell Devils	AHL	57	5	13	18	14	4	0	1	1	0
2010-11	Utah Grizzlies	ECHL	26	10	13	23	30
2010-11	Bakersfield Condors	ECHL	26	6	15	21	20
2010-11	Binghamton Senators	AHL	7	1	0	1	0
2010-11	Florida Everblades	ECHL	10	5	2	7	20	4	1	3	4	2
2011-12	Fassa	Italy	43	14	24	38	24	4	1	1	2	8
2012-13	EC Kassel Huskies	Germany3	36	41	46	87	6	19	11	29	40	6
2013-14	EC Kassel Huskies	Germany3	33	32	46	78	12	18	19	22	41	10
2014-15	ESV Kaufbeuren	Germany2	35	9	19	28	18
2014-15	Tilburg Trappers	Eredivisie	10	5	14	19	2	10	8	9	17	10
2015-16	Icefighters Leipzig	Germany3	42	38	67	105	38	8	2	6	8	6
2016-17	Herner EV 2007	Germany3	43	35	48	83	46	4	3	3	6	14
2017-18	Herner EV 2007	Germany3
2019	ECDC Memmingen	Germany3
