= Eissporthalle Kassel =

Indoor arena in Kassel, Germany

Coordinates: 51°17′52″N 9°28′57″E

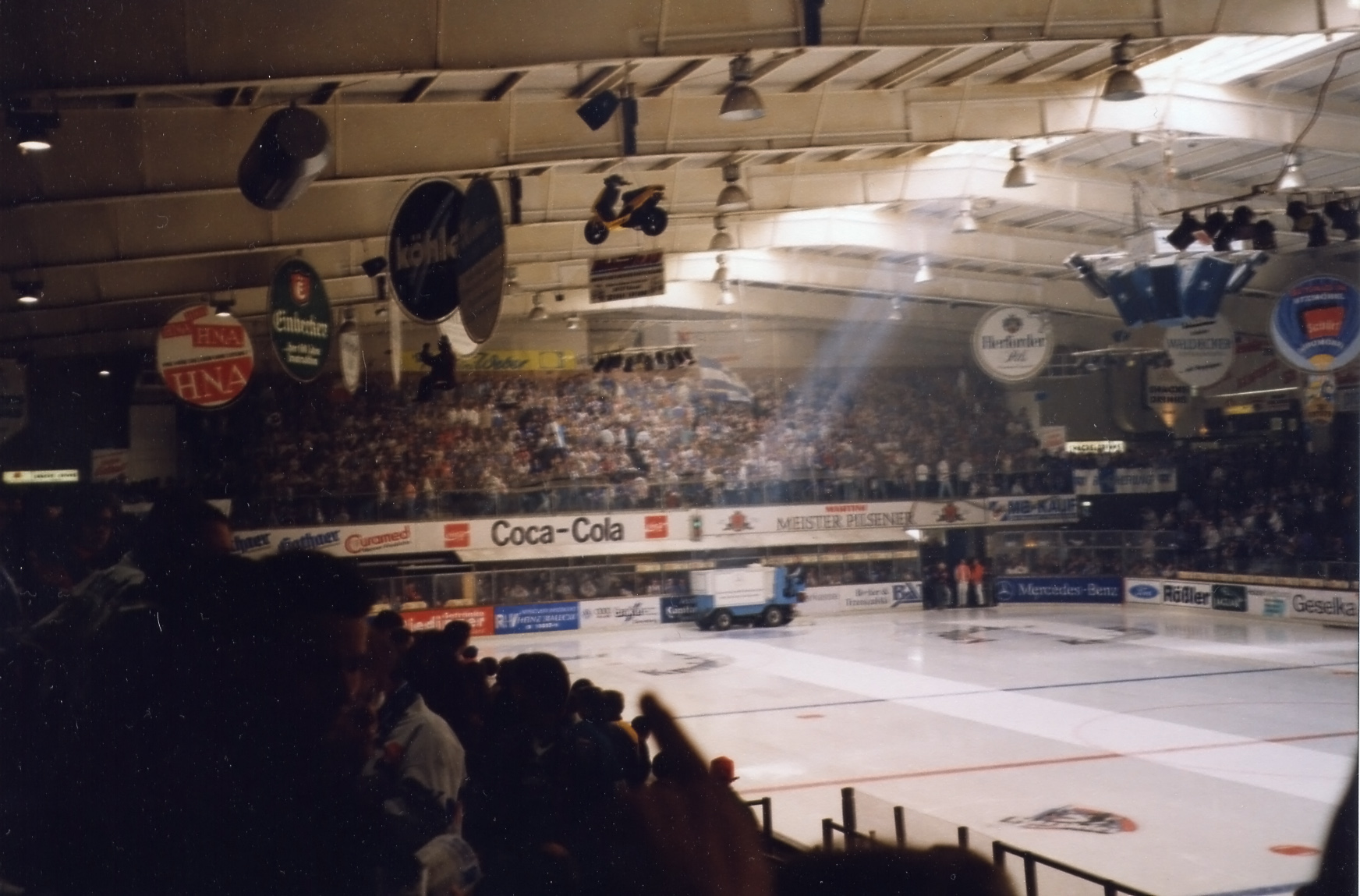
The hall during an ice hockey game (1997)

Eissporthalle Kassel, in English known as Kassel Ice Arena, is an indoor arena located in Kassel, Germany in the southeast end of Karlsaue. It opened in 1977 and holds 6,100 spectators. It is primarily used for ice hockey and was the home arena of Kassel Huskies of the Deutsche Eishockey Liga.
