= EC Kassel Huskies =

- City: Kassel, Hessen
- League: DEL2
- Founded: 19 February 1977 (49 years ago)
- Operated: 1977–present
- Home arena: Eissporthalle Kassel (capacity: 6,100)
- Colours: Blue, white
- Owner: (Germany) Simon Kimm
- General manager: (Canada) Joe Gibbs
- Captain: (Germany) Alexander Heinrich
- Affiliates: EJ Kassel Young Huskies (Youth); EJ Kassel Ice Cats (Women's)
- Website: Kassel Huskies Home

Franchise history
- 1977-1987: ESG Kassel
- 1987-1994: EC Kassel
- 1994-2010: Kassel Huskies
- 2010-present: EC Kassel Huskies

Championships
- 2. Bundesliga: 1 (2007–08)
- DEL2: 1 (2015–16)
- Hessenliga: 1 (2010–11)

The EC Kassel Huskies are a professional ice hockey club based in Kassel, Hessen, Germany. The club currently competes in DEL2, the second level of ice hockey in Germany. The Huskies were founded in 1977 and have competed in the top five levels of the hockey in Germany since that time. Kassel's home barn is the Eissporthalle Kassel, which has a capacity of 6,100. The club's nickname is the Sled Dogs. Kassel has won two second level championships in 2008 and 2016 and have won one top level junior championship in 2004. The Huskies have finished runner-up in Germany's top league, DEL, in 1997 and have been beaten finalists in the Deutscher Eishockey-Pokal in 2004.

== History ==
=== Ice Hockey in Kassel before and founding of the club ===
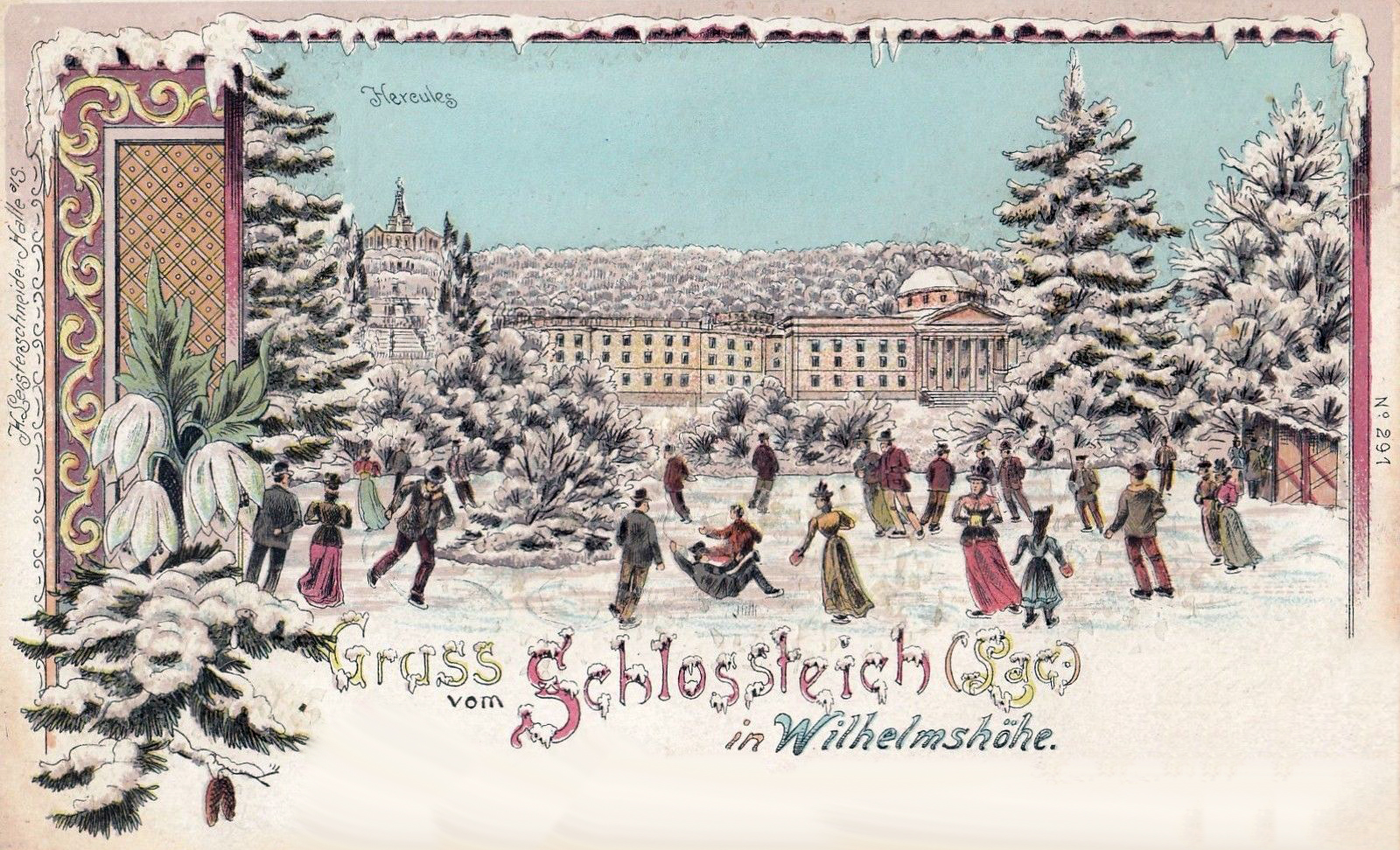
Skating on the castle pond, winter 1900–1901

In the 19th century, the Karlsaue park was already a popular place for ice skating during the winter months on the frozen Fulda river. Skating in Kassel at the time was called ‘foot skating’. The earliest example of ice hockey being played in Kassel came from a 1926 photo from the court photographer Carl Eberth, depicting young people playing ice hockey on the frozen Fulda.

In 1966, Helmut Spohr, a former football player for KSV Hessen Kassel, introduced the idea of establishing an ice hockey club. Spohr teamed up with Viktor Klement to form what was the first ice hockey team in Kassel, ESV Jahn Kassel. They managed to source some disused firefighting water hoses and in winter they built an outdoors ice rink with the hoses on top of a tennis court in the park as there were no ice machines. Players started to join in the games and eventually they had enough for a team to play other regional social community groups in Hannover and Bad Nauheim.

Season	League	Finish	Finals
1977/78	RL	5th	DNQ
1978/79	RL	5th	DNQ
1979/80	RL	1st	2nd

Kassel Huskies was established 19 February 1977 as ESG Kassel Ice Sports Community. The club was established the same year as the first indoor ice rink was built in Kassel, the Eissporthalle Kassel, by Edith and Simon Kimm.

ESG Kassel began life playing in the Regionalliga, the fourth division of German ice hockey, in the 1977/78 Regionalliga West season. Their first official match was played on 30 October 1977 against SV Brackwede. 900 spectators turned out for the opening match. Kassel, led by Canadian head coach Danny Coutu, lost their opening match 2–5. Interest in the team and the sport grew in northern Hessen and soon the team was achieving public attendance at matches of up to 3,000 people in their opening season. Kassel went on to finish midtable in 5th place.

ESG Kassel repeated their form in 1978/79 by finishing fifth in the league table and missing out on finals. However, in 1979/80, the team finished first in the league standings, qualifying for their first finals series and getting promoted to Oberliga. They went on to finish runner-up in the finals.

=== Promotion to 2.Bundesliga and ESG bankruptcy (1980–1987) ===
Season	League	Finish	Finals
1980/81	OL	3rd	4th ^{↑}
1981/82	OL	2nd	2nd ^{↑}
1982/83	OL	1st	5th ^{↑}
1983/84	2. BL	7th	1st ^{↓}
1984/85	2. BL	6th	1st ^{↓}
1985/86	2. BL	3rd	5th ^{↑}
1986/87	2. BL	2nd	7th ^{↑}

Kassel quickly settled into life in the Oberliga and established itself as a top-three team within the league. Led by players who would go on to become legends of the club, Herbert Heinrich and Shane Tarves, Kassel challenged for promotion to the 2.Bundesliga. In 1981/82 the team finished second in the league and runner-up in the finals to qualify for promotion to 2.Bundesliga. However, due to financial limitations the club was unable to accept the promotion and remained in Oberliga. The following season the City of Kassel stepped in to shore up financial support of the team and under the guidance of Finnish coach Jorma Siitarinen, Kassel finished top of the table and were promoted to 2.Bundesliga.

Kassel staved off relegation back to the Oberliga in their first two seasons in the 2.Bundesliga by winning their relegation play-offs. The club reinvested in the playing roster and brought in a number of high-profile expensive players to the club including Dave O'Brien and Miroslav Dvořák to start to challenge for promotion to the Bundesliga. The club was again in a risky financial position after the investments in the roster and needed promotion to the top division to help pay off the debts.

ESG finished the 1985–86 season in third spot, missing promotion by two points. A decisive local Hessen derby against rivals Eintracht Frankfurt (today Löwen Frankfurt) is regarded as the match promotion was lost. Kassel led 3–0 in the match but Frankfurt came from behind to defeat them 4–3. The following season, Kassel again challenged for the league title and promotion but finished second behind BSC Preussen. These miss opportunities proved costly for the club and they had to file for bankruptcy in 1987.

=== New beginnings and founding member of DEL (1987–1994) ===
16 May 1987, a new organisation was set up to succeed ESG. The new organisation was called Eissport-Club Kassel e. V., EC Kassel (ECK) for short. The club remained in the 2.Bundesliga for season 87/88, however due to the high operating costs of competing in the level two league it was decided to voluntarily be relegated back to Oberliga at the conclusion of the season. The roster was dismantled by new coach Richard Piechutta. Shane Tarves was chosen to captain the new team that was filled with players promoted from the youth team. Kassel was surprisingly successful and spent just two seasons in Oberliga before being promoted back to the 2.Bundesliga.

Season	League	Finish	Finals
1987/88	2. BL	3rd	6th ^{↑}
1988/89	OL	4th	9th ^{↑}
1989/90	OL	3rd	6th ^{↑}
1990/91	2. BL	6th	1st ^{↓}
1991/92	2. BL	1st	7th ^{↑}
1992/93	2. BL	5th	QF
1993/94	2. BL	2nd	RU

ECK survived their first season back in the 2.Bundesliga and once again quickly become a promotion contender in the league. In 92/93 the Kassel reached the quarter finals in the play-offs before going better in 93/94 and becoming runner-up, being defeated 3–0 in the best of three series by Augsburger EV.

1994 marked the year of the establishment of a new professional and independent top division in German hockey. The Bundesliga was replaced by the Deutsche Eishockey Liga (DEL). Upon the formation of the new DEL, a number of clubs from the old Bundesliga and 2.Bundesliga folded or went bankrupt, leaving 18 clubs to fill the top two divisions. Kassel applied and was inducted into DEL, becoming a founding member, the first time the club had reached the top division of German hockey.

Using the NHL as a base model for the new league, teams became limited liability companies and took on new names often involving pseudonyms from the animal world. EC Kassel was dissolved, and in its place the club formed new two organisations. Ice Hockey Youth Kassel e.V was established to run the operations of the women's and junior programs and act as parent club for the new limited liability company set-up for the men's program, EC Kassel Huskies Sportmanagement GmbH. So within DEL, Kassel officially became known as the Kassel Huskies, named after the Siberian Husky.

=== Successful years in DEL (1994–1998) ===
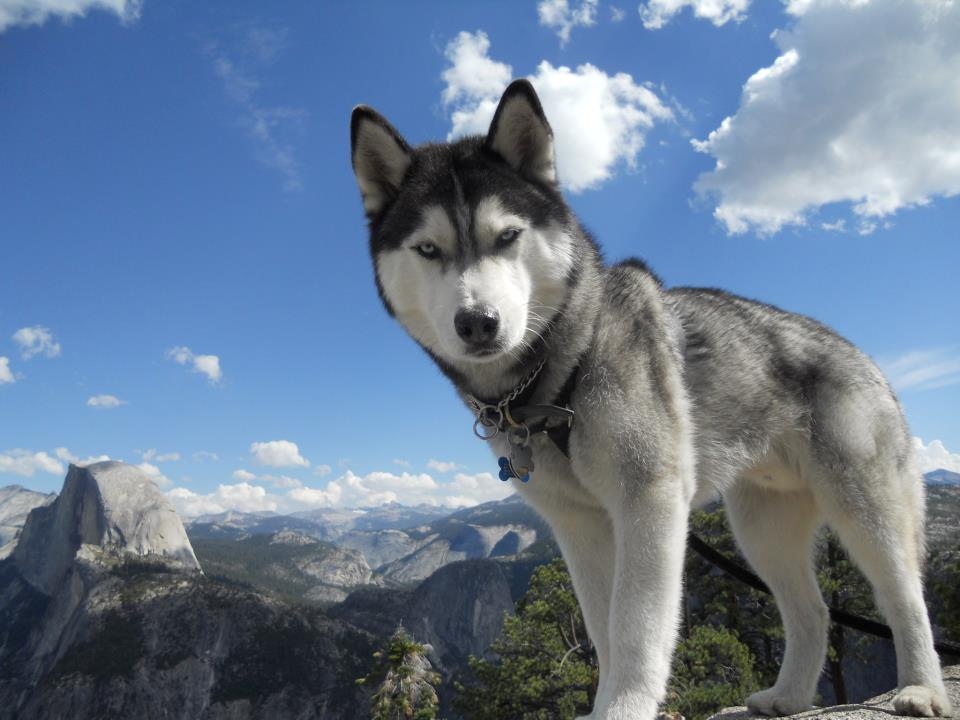
Siberian Husky

The Huskies made an immediate impact in the DEL. At executive level, bankrupt trustee Martin Lepper stepped down from his position at the club now that the Huskies were financially stable. Gerhard Swoboda and Uli Egen took over operations at the club as president and general manager respectively. The Sled Dogs over performed in the league in its first two seasons. Reaching the play-offs for the German title. In both 94/95 and 95/96, the Huskies were defeated in the play-offs at the quarter finals stage by arch rivals Frankfurt Lions.

In 1995 the ‘Bosman ruling’ came into effect in the EU. Professional players were now allowed to leave a club for another one for free once their current contract expired. This court decision opened up the European market for ice hockey clubs in Germany. Kassel head coach, Gerhard Brunner, took advantage of the new regulations and brought in an unprecedented number of European players to play for the Huskies. By 1996, Kassel had nine Scandinavian players on their books including 1994 Swedish Olympic champion, Roger Hansson.

1996/97 was a milestone year for the Kassel Huskies. They achieved their best ever finish to a season in the club's history. Kassel finished fourth in the regular season standings, qualifying for the championship round. The Sled Dogs improved in the championship round and finished third behind Kölner Haie and Adler Mannheim, qualifying for the play-offs. The Huskies defeated Starbulls Rosenheim and EHC Eisbären Berlin on route to the Championship final where they came up against Adler Mannheim. Kassel were regarded as underdogs for the best of five final, with Adler having won the regular season and championship round. The Huskies sold 20,000 tickets for finals home match while 3,500 fans filled the exhibition hall in Kassel to watch the matches on TV. The Huskies went on to lose the finals series 3–0 to Mannheim but on 16 April 1997 over 10,000 supporters filled the streets around town hall in Kassel to celebrate the team's success in becoming German runner-up for the first time. Kassel's mayor at the time, Georg Lewandowski, led the celebrations by saying the Huskies should be proud of their achievements given just three years earlier they were playing in the 2nd Bundesliga and now they were the second best team in the country.

The success of 1996/97 led the Huskies to qualify for the European Hockey League for the first time in 1997/98. This was the first time the Huskies got to compete internationally in the club's history. The Sled Dogs brought in former Stanley Cup winner Paul DiPietro to assist with their European campaign. Kassel, who also had a new head coach in Czech Milan Mokroš, was ultimately unsuccessful in their first European challenge. The Huskies failed to qualify out of the group stage and were eliminated after six matches. Kassel defeated Czech side HC Vítkovice twice but lost to Swedish team Färjestad BK and Finnish team Jokerit Helsinki four times (two times each).

The Huskies were unable to replicate their previous season's success in the DEL in 97/98. They finished midtable in the regular season and failed to qualify for the play-offs. Milan Mokroš was dismissed at the conclusion of the season and German hall of fame legend Hans Zach was appointed his successor for 1998/99, maintaining the club's newfound importance in the German ice hockey landscape.

=== The return of Hans Zach (1998–2004) ===
Hans Zach's appointment in 98/99 elevated the Huskies program to newfound heights. He was both Kassel and German national team head coach at the same time. Zach's appointment contributed to ice hockey becoming the most popular sport in Kassel, leapfrogging football. Hans introduced a well drilled dogged defensive style of hockey that made the team hard to break down. Zach was instrumental in bringing in national team players to play for Kassel such as Daniel Kreutzer.

Kassel's performances in the league became very consistent with the club finishing in the top five and qualifying for the play-offs four seasons in a row. On 25 September 2002 Hans’ Huskies defeated the Nürnberg Ice Tigers 3–0. The result saw the Sled Dogs move into first place in the DEL league standings for the first and only time in the club's history.

The solid performances under Zach led the Kassel financial supporter, Simon Kimm, to invest new money into the club. Mr Kimm invested 15 million Deutsche Marks (around €7.6 million). The money secured the club and led to plans for the construction of a new Northern Hessen arena to host the Huskies and European handball team MT Melsungen.

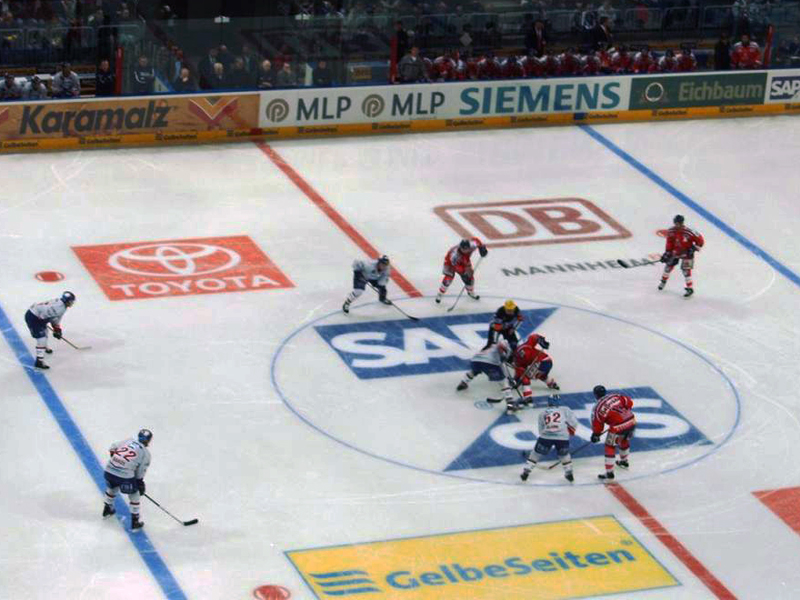
Match between Adler Mannheim and Kassel at SAP Arena

Before the start of the 2002/03 season, Kassel Huskies were rocked by news of the departure of Hans Zach to rival DEL club Kölner Haie (Cologne Sharks). The Sharks were seven time German champions and one of the best teams in the league. Hans justified the switch stating he was tired of players he trained moving onto more prestigious clubs. Assistant coach, Axel Kammerer, was named his successor.

Kassel's standing suffered after Zach left. The 2002/03 season saw the Huskies finished outside the top five for the first time in five seasons. They still qualified for finals by finishing seventh but in the quarter-finals they met the Cologne Sharks and Hans Zach. The best of seven series went down to the wire in the seventh match. Ultimately Kassel lost game seven and Zach's Sharks went on to reach the final. Off the ice, there was constant rotation in the backroom with Kassel going through four head coaches. The conveyor belt of head coaches led to inconsistent approaches to tactics and cohesion on the ice with both attacking and defensive approaches implemented.

In 2003/04 the Huskies had an uneventful DEL season finishing eleventh in the league and missing out on the play-offs. Kassel did however perform well in the newly established Deutscher Eishockey-Pokal (German Cup). The Cup was being contested for the second time in 03/04 and the Huskies had progressed from the first round to reach the final. Along the way the Sled Dogs defeated Dresdner Eislöwen (round 1), Landshut Cannibals (round 2), Eisbären Berlin (QF) and SC Riessersee (SF). The final was held at the Kölnarena on 10 February 2004. The Huskies once again came up against their former coach Hans Zach and the Cologne Sharks. The Sharks got off to a good start in the first period and took a 2–1 lead into the first break. From there Kassel found it impossible to break down the Sharks’ defence and Hans once against orchestrated a famous victory over his former team for the second time in two seasons since leaving.

=== Relegation and promotion (2004–2008) ===
After eleven straight years of participation in the highest level of hockey in Germany, Kassel suffered their worst performance in the league in 2004–05. The Huskies lost 35 of 52 matches in the regular season and for the first time they participated in the relegation playoffs (play-downs as they are known in Germany). In the playoffs, Kassel came up against Grizzly Adams Wolfsburg in a best-of-seven match series. Kassel lost match seven, 2–3, to lose the series and confirm their relegation to 2nd Bundesliga. However, the Huskies were saved from relegation when Wolfsburg failed to secure a DEL licence for the following season and they were relegated instead of Kassel.

The off-season saw the team enter crisis with major shareholder Simon Kimm withdrawing his financial support for the team and resigning from the club. The Huskies were once again threatened with bankruptcy. In the eleventh hour the club secured a new major shareholder, Rainer Lippe, who took up the position of managing director with the Huskies. Kassel's DEL licence and existence as a top-level club was secured.

The wave of optimism around the new ownership of the team was short lived during 2005–06 season as the Huskies returned to familiar poor form on the ice. Kassel finished the regular season second last in the table with just 20 wins from 52 matches. This meant once again the Huskies would face a relegation playoff for the second season in a row. Kassel's opponent for the playoffs was Füchse Duisburg. The series went for five matches with Kassel suffering defeat, 1–4. Kassel was relegated to the 2nd Bundesliga after twelve years in the first division.

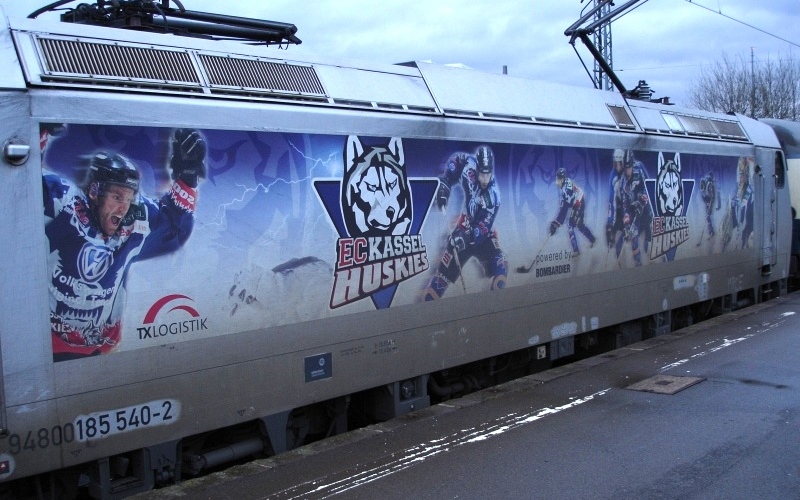
Kassel's 'Happy train' used in 07/08 finals with Landshut

To compound relegation, the club suffered another setback off the ice with the Huskies losing the right to keep using their logo. Kassel had not trademarked the logo and a Scottish manufacturer claimed the logo and trademarked it for themselves. Kassel was forced to redesign, and a new design was selected for the next season. The new logo proved unpopular with supporters and the Huskies redesigned the logo for a second time after just one season.

In the second division, Kassel wasted no time establishing their platform for immediate promotion back to the DEL. The Huskies were named league premiers at the conclusion of the 2006–07 regular season, having topped the table by 13 points ahead of Grizzly Adams Wolfsburg. During the promotion playoffs, Kassel clean swept their quarter and semi-final series’ against Eisbären Regensburg and EHC München. The Huskies faced Wolfsburg in the promotion final. However, Kassel fell short in the final series as they were defeated 0–3.

In 2007–08, Kassel began the season as favourites for promotion once more. The Huskies improved on their regular season record compared to the season before by finishing the season with 122 points, 27 points ahead of second placed Landshut Cannibals. During the promotion playoffs Kassel once more reached the final, defeating ETC Crimmitschau and Schwenninger Wild Wings on the way. In the final the Huskies faced Landshut Cannibals in a best of five match series. Kassel commissioned a special train to move fans to and from finals matches in the city as well as in Landshut. This train was nicknamed the ‘Happy train’. Kassel won the series, 3–2, thanks to an overtime winner in game 5 by Drew Bannister. The Huskies secured promotion back to DEL.

=== Promotion back to DEL and bankruptcy (2008–2010) ===
Kassel secured its position back in the DEL after a two-year absence on 4 July 2008 when the team agreed to two key conditions of entry. The Huskies agreed to increasing the stadium capacity to 9,000 and paying DEL a licence fee of €800,000. The Sled Dogs were financially backed by the state of Hessen, who provided the team with a €2.1 million guaranteed loan.

The Huskies return to top flight hockey got off to a successful start. The team performed well in the 2008/09 Deutscher Eishockey-Pokal, finishing first in the group stage before reaching the semi-finals. They were defeated by the Hannover Scorpions 1–2 in extra time in their semi-final. In the league, Dominic Auger scored Kassel's first goal back in DEL, on the way to the team winning three of their opening four matches. The Huskies defeated the previous season's runner-up, Kölner Haie, 5–1 but the Sled Dogs could not maintain the form and ended the season in 14th place (out of sixteen teams).

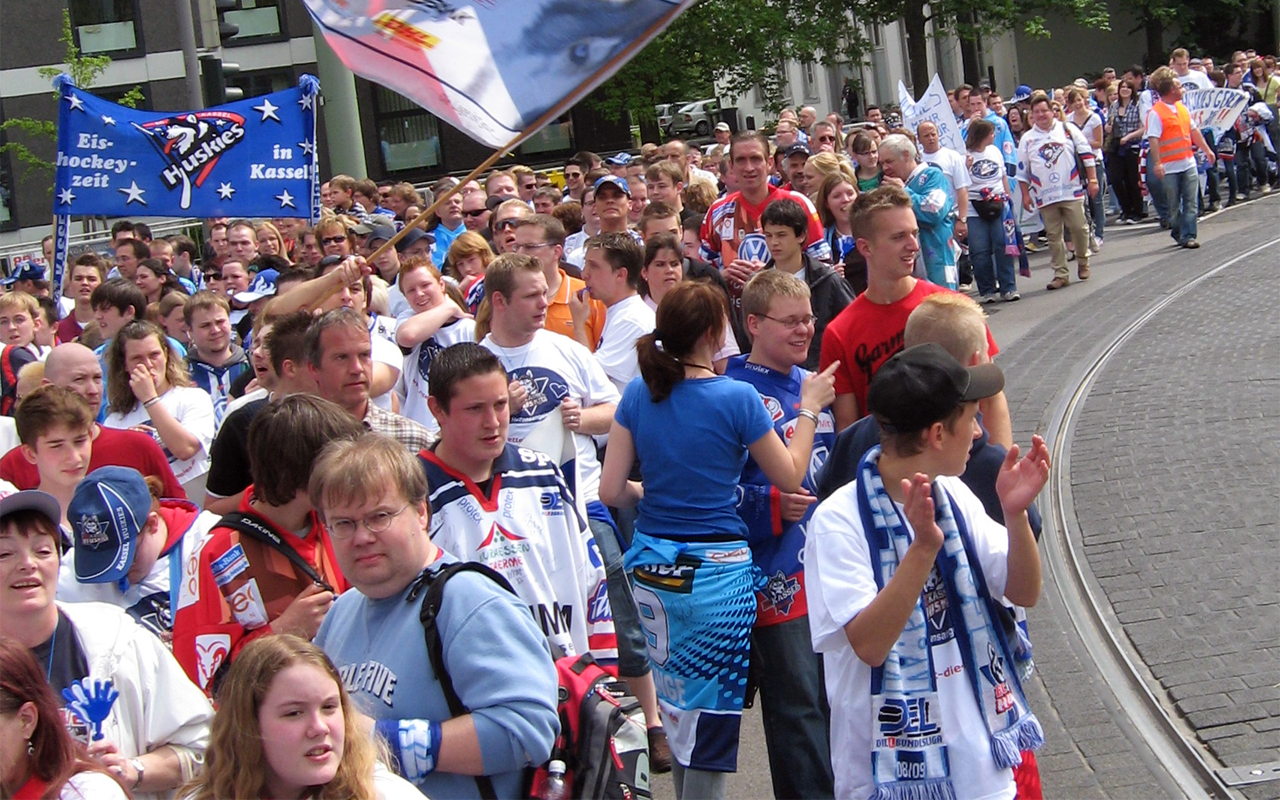
Kassel fans rally to save the team in 2009

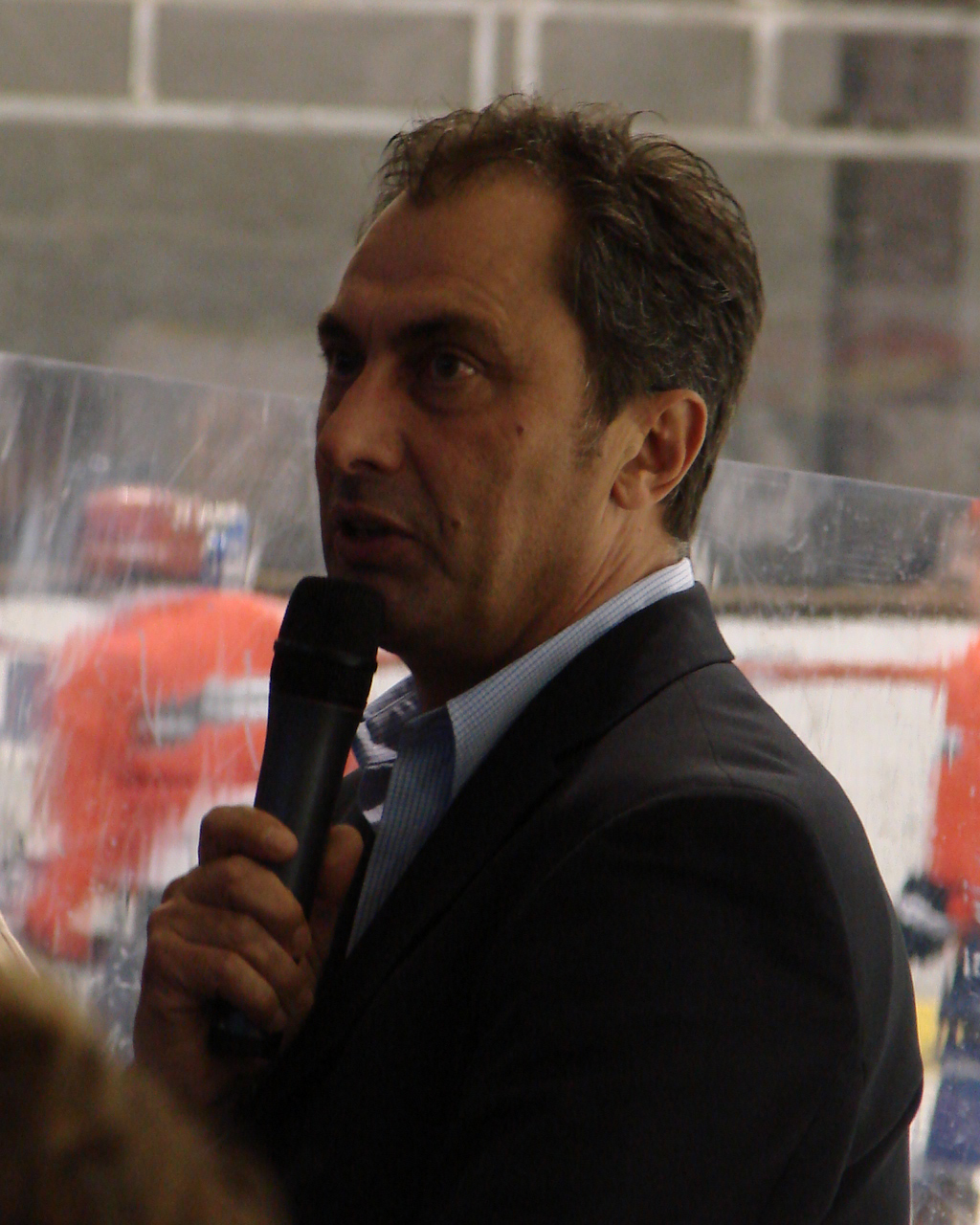
Rainer Lippe, owner of the Kassel Huskies

During the summer offseason, the Huskies entered into a financial crisis with the withdrawal of financial sponsorship of major sponsor Volkswagen Genuine Parts. The financial uncertainty threatened the team's DEL licence and Rainer Lippe considered the sale of the license and his resignation as manager in order to ensure that the Kassel Huskies remained in the league. On 9 May 2009, over 1,000 Kassel locals formed a rally and marched through downtown Kassel in support of the team. The then Kassel mayor, Bertram Hilgen, declared his support for the team and rallied businesses and the people of Kassel to donate to the cause. Over the course of May more fund raising events were held including €20 blood donations with the motto 'Heart for the Huskies'. By the end of the month the people of Kassel had raised enough money from donations and new sponsorships to pay for the DEL licence fee. In July 2009, the Huskies received a licence from DEL for the upcoming 2009/10 season. Lippe announced the budget for the team would be tight but he had budgeted to provide the supports a discount on season tickets for all their hard work in saving the team.

Similar to the previous season, the Huskies started the season off well. They defeated the reigning champion, Berlin, and runner-up, Düsseldorf, in their opening three matches. The Sled Dogs settled into a midtable position in the league standings for much of the season but a poor 12 match losing streak in November and December derailed the Huskies season and they ended the season in last place in the league, nine points behind their previous season total.

The Huskies remained in financial uncertainty at the conclusion of the season. Head coach, Stéphane Richer, ran down his contract and chose to leave the team and was appointed new head coach by the Hamburg Freezers. Dean Fedorchuk was appointed Richer's successor but there was a number of players who were also out of contract and at risk of leaving the team. Kassel did manage to retain the services of up and coming local boy and German international, Manuel Klinge.

In January 2010, after increasing pressure, Rainer Lippe sold the team to Dennis Rossing. Rossing was the owner of Rosco Group, the major investor in the construction of the proposed North Hessen Arena. Rossing bought the team for €1 and in doing so took on the large debt the Huskies team carried. Rossing set about re-structuring the team's finances. He asked all sponsors to fill the short term €500,000 shortfall in team funds and only paid the playing staff half of what they were contractually owed. Rossing was unable to secure the necessary funding and his actions eventually led to the team declaring bankruptcy.

On 27 May 2010, the DEL's shareholder meeting responded to the bankruptcy by cancelling the Huskies licence and excluding Kassel from the next DEL season. A day later, Rossing sought and was granted an interim two week court order to lift the DEL exclusion and continue negotiations between all parties. After further unsuccessful negotiations regarding the €2.8 million debt the DEL again denied Kassel a licence for the new season on the grounds of the team's insolvency. The Huskies applied for a 2. Bundesliga licence, but that to was rejected. Professional hockey in Kassel had come to an end.

=== Rebirth and rebuild (2010–2014) ===
The Huskies were re-founded after the conclusion of the bankruptcy proceedings by the youth department as the new men's program named Eishockeyclub Kassel Huskies (EC Kassel Huskies). The team entered the fifth tier of German hockey in the Hessenliga for season 2010/11. The Sled Dogs dominated the amateur Hessen league, going undefeated in all sixteen matches. Kassel racked up a positive goal difference for 243 and won the play-offs to be named champions and qualify for promotion to the Regionalliga. Instead, the Huskies applied for a licence to the Oberliga West (third tier) and were successful in gaining the licence for the 2011/12 season.

Kassel spent three seasons in the Oberliga. They finished third in the league and failed to reach the promotion play-offs in the first season. In the following two seasons, the Huskies finished in the top two of the league ladder and performed well in the play-offs. Kassel fell short in winning the league championship on both occasions. In 2012/13 the final series against EC Bad Nauheim went down to the wire with Kassel losing out 2–3 in game five in overtime to lose the series 2–3. In 2013/14, the Huskies finished second in the first two stages of the season but then finished first in the promotion play-off group stage to secure promotion to DEL2 pending financial conditions being met. In August 2014, the Huskies were granted a professional licence to join DEL2 and the club established a new operating company, Kasseler Sport & Entertainment GmbH (KSE), to run the professional operations of the club.

=== Return to professional hockey (2014–present) ===
Kassel's first season in DEL2 was 2014/15. The Huskies first professional match in DEL2 came at home at the Eissporthalle Kassel against Lausitzer Füchse on 12 September 2014. In front of 3,522 spectators, the Sled Dogs fell behind in the first period but quickly levelled through German player Austin Wycisk. The match remained tight but high scoring for the remainder of the final two periods. Füchse ended up victorious and defeated Kassel 5–4. The Huskies first victory in DEL2 came in round three on the road on 19 September 2014. The Sled Dogs defeated EC Bad Nauheim 5–3 with a dominant third period sealing the victory. For the rest of the season Kassel performed very well, finishing the regular season third in the league standings and qualifying for the pay-offs. In the play-offs the Huskies came up against EV Landshut in the quarter-finals. The Sled Dogs were defeated 4–1 in the best of seven series to end their season.

In 2015/16, The Huskies again enjoyed a solid regular season, finishing third in the standings. In the Championship Play-offs, the Sled Dogs defeated archrivals, Löwen Frankfurt 4–0 in the quarter finals series. In the semi-finals the Huskies defeated Ravensburg Towerstars 4–2 in the best of seven series. Kassel came up against the previous season champions, Bietigheim Steelers, in the DEL2 final series. The Huskies went into the series as underdogs after the Steelers won the regular season. In front of packed stadiums, Kassel defeated the Steelers in a 4–0 series sweep to clinch the DEL2 title and trophy for the first time. In the final match, hosted in Kassel, the Huskies fought back from two goals down to win 5–2 with Manuel Klinge (twice), Alexander Heinrich, Taylor Carnevale and Mike Little all getting on the scoresheet.

During 2017 and 2018 the Huskies did not perform well in the league. The team next performed well in 2019/20. The Huskies led the league for much of the 2019/20 DEL2 season before going on a late season losing streak in the final month. The Sled Dogs finished the season in second place in the final standings behind rivals Frankfurt, qualifying for the championship play-offs. The play-offs were then cancelled due to the COVID-19 pandemic, ending Kassel's season prematurely. The DEL2 decided no champion would be named for the 2019/20 season.

=== League history ===
- Level 1 - DEL
  1994–2006, 2008–2010
- Level 2 - 2. Bundesliga / DEL2
  1983–1988, 1990–1994, 2006–2008, 2014–present
- Level 3 - Oberliga
  1980–1983, 1988–1990, 2011–2014
- Level 4 - Regionalliga
  1977–1980
- Level 5 - Hessenliga
  2010-2011

== Honors ==
=== Champions ===
- 2. Bundesliga (1): 2008
- DEL2 (1): 2016
- Hessenliga (1): 2011

=== Runners-up ===
- Deutsche Eishockey Liga (1): 1997
- DEL2 (1): 2020
- Oberliga (1): 2013
- German Cup (1): 2004

== Players ==
=== Current roster ===
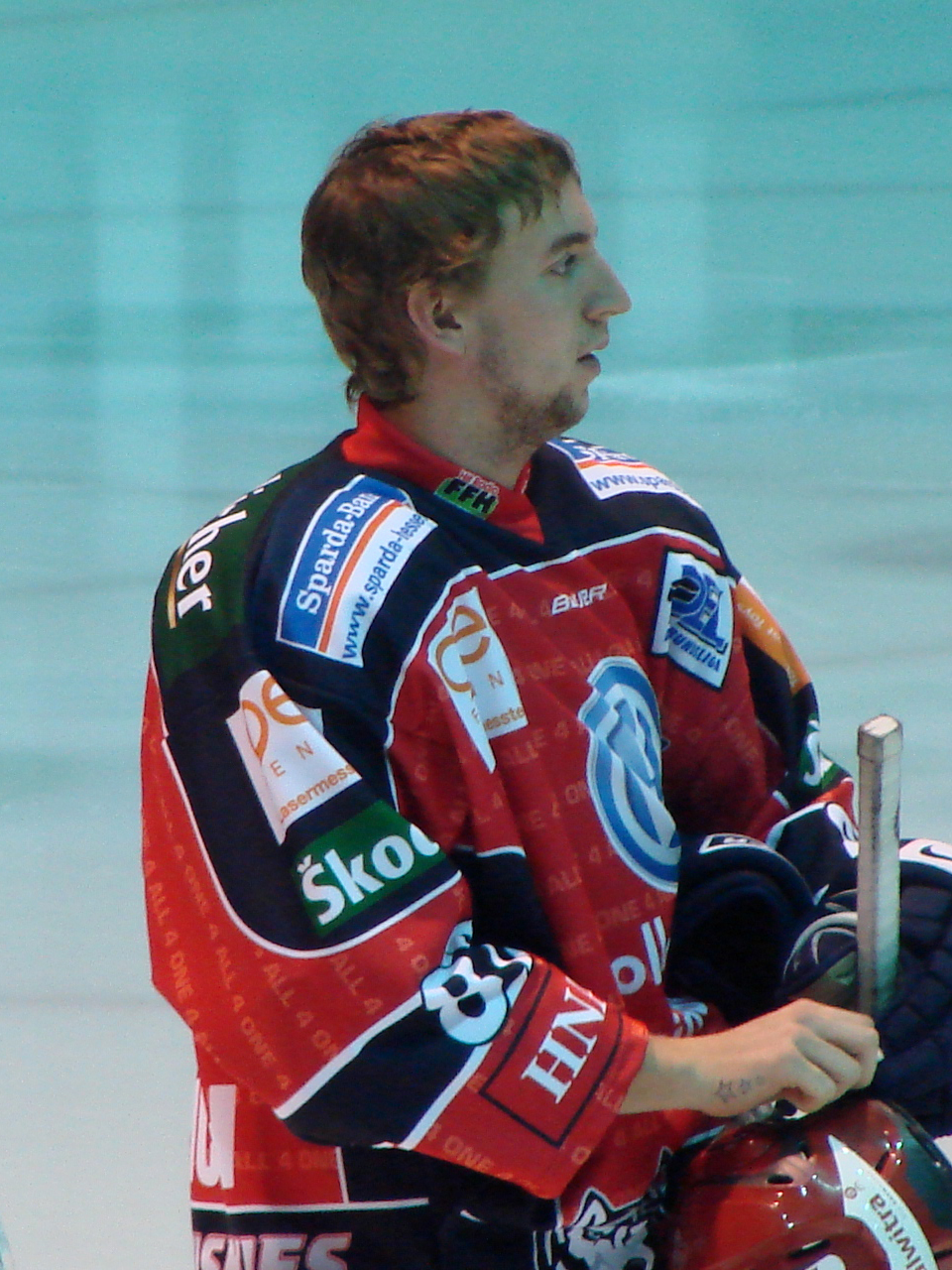
Alexander Heinrich, captain and one of the longest serving members of the current Huskies roster, playing for Kassel in 2009

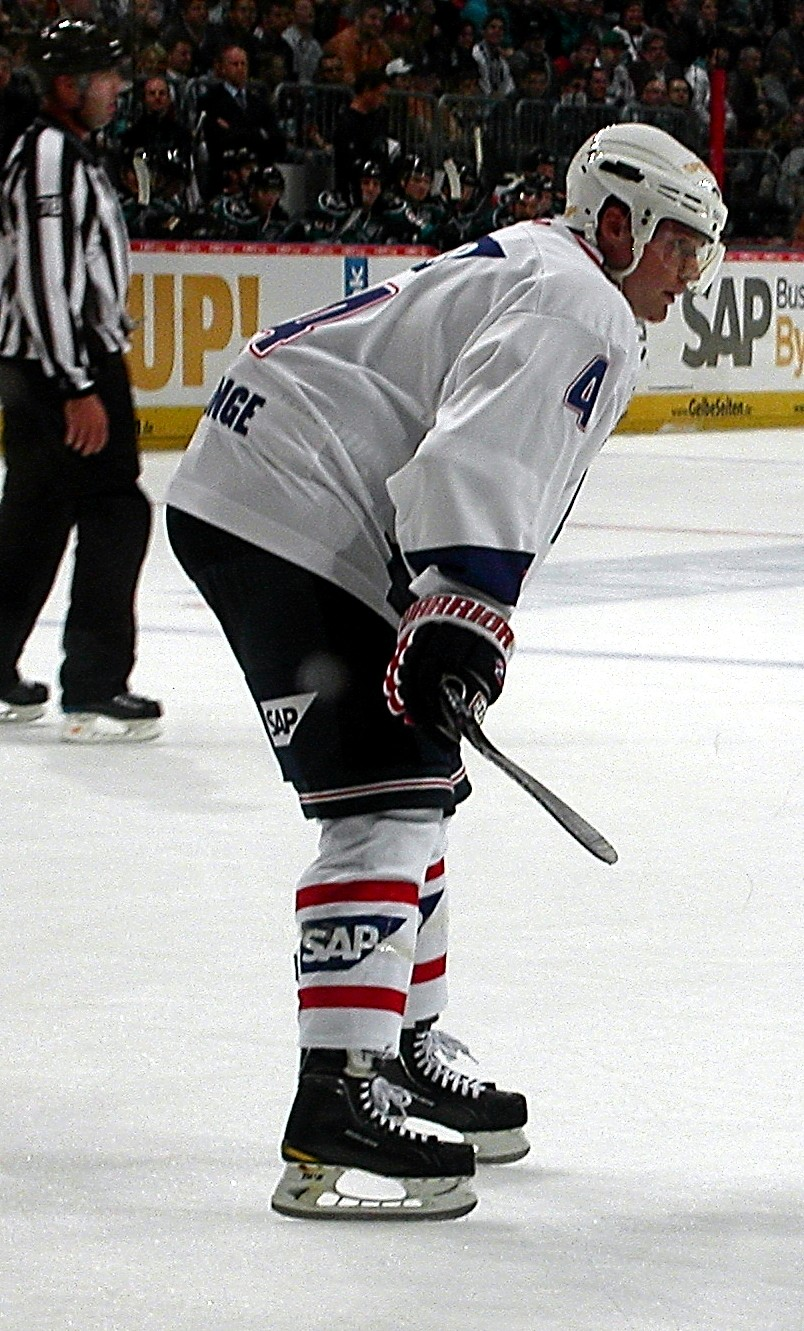
Manuel Klinge, one of the longest serving members of the current Huskies roster. He has played almost his entire career since 1999 in Kassel

Team roster for the 2018–19 DEL2 season

2018-19 Kassel Huskies Roster
#	Nat	Name	Pos	S/G	Age	Acquired	Birthplace
31	(Germany)	Leon Hungerecker	G	L	28	2017	Lüneburg, Germany
35	(Germany)	Gerald Kuhn	G	L	40	2019	Southgate, Michigan, United States
47	(Germany)	Derek Dinger	D	L	39	2018	Kassel, Germany
78	(Germany)	Alexander Heinrich (C)	D	L	39	2008	Kassel, Germany
26	(Germany)	Florian Kraus	D	R	31	2016	Garmisch-Partenkirchen, Germany
55	(United States)	Mike Little	D	R	39	2017	Enfield, Connecticut, USA
22	(Germany)	Marco Müller	D	R	25	2018	Heilbronn, Germany
15	(Germany)	Denis Shevyrin	D	L	31	2019	St. Petersburg, Russia
25	(Germany)	Nick Walters	D	L	32	2018	St. Albert, Alberta, Canada
64	(Germany)	Jannik Woidtke	D	R	35	2019	Düsseldorf, Germany
94	(Poland)	Noureddine Bettahar	RW	R	31	2019	Trier, Germany
11	(Germany)	Valentin Busch	F	L	28	2018	Erding, Germany
80	(Germany)	Lasse Bödefeld	F	L	27	2018	Hann. Münden, Germany
29	(Germany)	Adriano Carciola	LW	R	38	2017	Kassel, Germany
13	(Germany)	Michael Christ (A)	LW	L	37	2011	Kassel, Germany
37	(Canada)	Tyler Gron	C	R	37	2018	Spruce Grove, Alberta, Canada
63	(Canada)	Jace Hennig	C	L	31	2018	Port Moody, British Columbia, Canada
24	(Belarus)	Alexander Karachun	F	L	31	2018	Gdańsk, Poland
9	(Germany)	Manuel Klinge	RW	R	42	2011	Kassel, Germany
72	(Germany)	Tim Lucca Krüger	F	L	28	2017	Kassel, Germany
70	(Canada)	Jens Meilleur	RW	R	33	2016	Marquette, Manitoba, Canada
61	(Germany)	Richard Mueller (A)	LW/RW	R	44	2018	Richmond, British Columbia, Canada
91	(United States)	Sam Povorozniouk	C	R	31	2018	Northbrook, Illinois, United States
38	(Germany)	Bastian Schirmacher	F	L	28	2017	Hannover, Germany
10	(Canada)	Sébastien Sylvestre	C	L	33	2018	Boucherville, Quebec, Canada
68	(Canada)	Corey Trivino	C	L	36	2018	Toronto, Ontario, Canada
27	(Germany)	Eric Valentin	F	R	29	2018	Donaueschingen, Germany

=== 2. Bundesliga Championship roster ===
The Kassel Huskies team of 2007/08 set league records for 2. Bundesliga by finishing the regular season on 122 points, 27 points ahead of second placed Landshut Cannibals. The Sled Dogs won the play-offs, defeating the same opposition in the final 3–2, attaining promotion back to the top division in the process. Drew Bannister was named the league's best defender and Shawn McNeil finished the season as top point scorer with 70 points.

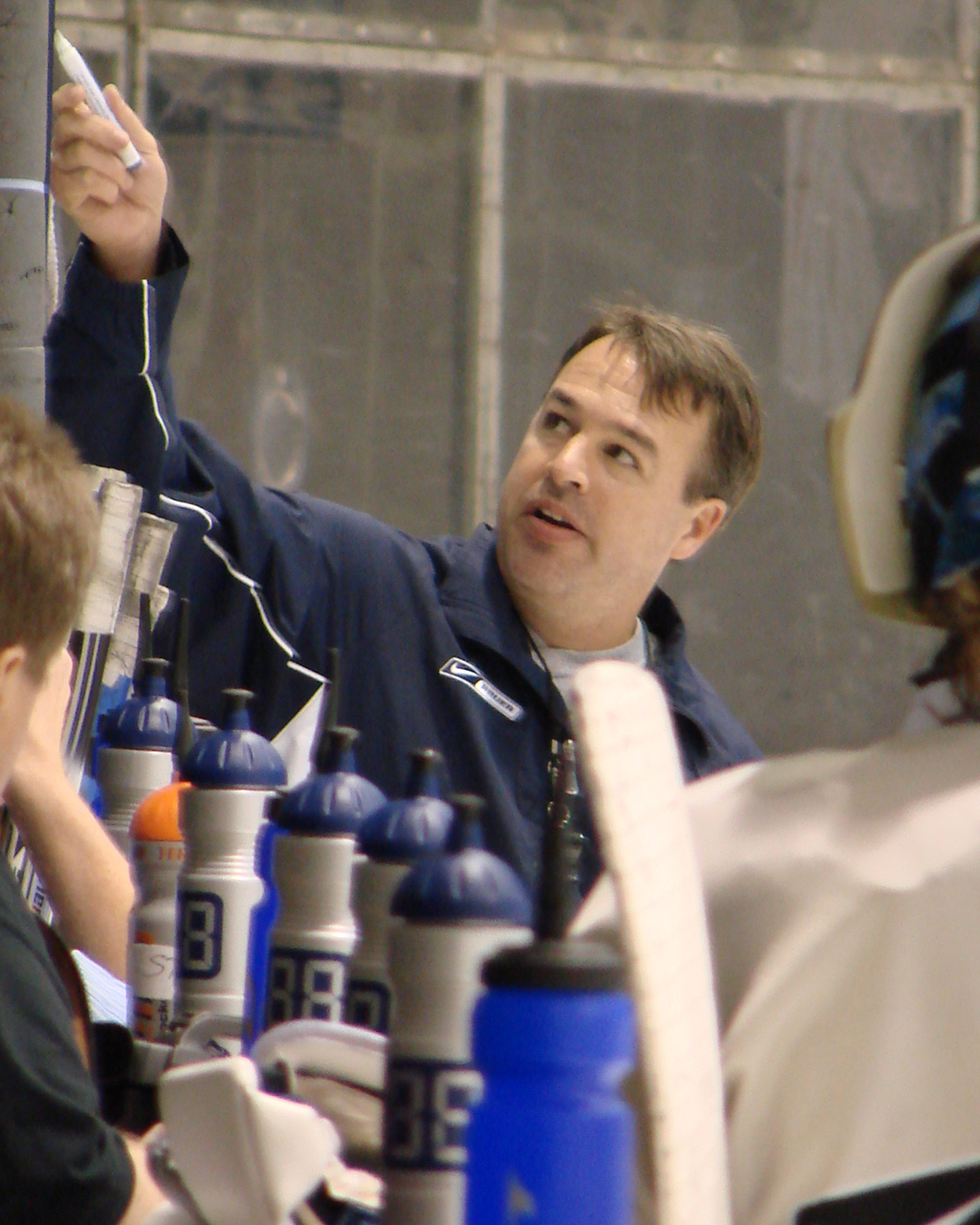
Stéphane Richer, head coach in 2007/08

2007/08 Championship Roster
Goaltenders
(Germany) #1 Boris Rousson	(Germany) #25 Sebastian Elwing	(Czech Republic) #29 Adam Ondraschek	(Slovakia) #53 Marek Mastič
Defencemen
(United States) #2 Vince Macri	(Belgium) #6 Mike Pellegrims	(Canada) #7 Drew Bannister (A)	(Germany) #8 René Kramer
(Germany) #11 Guy Lehoux	(Germany) #22 Brad Burym	(Germany) #39 Daniel Rau	(Russia) #65 Semen Glusanok
Forwards
(Germany) #9 Manuel Klinge	(Canada) #12 Hugo Boisvert (C)	(Germany) #13 Tobias Schwab	(Germany) #14 Mark Kosick
(Canada) #15 Dylan Gyori	(United States) #17 Ryan Kraft	(Germany) #19 Thorben Saggau	(Poland) #20 Jacek Płachta (A)
(Canada) #21 Shawn McNeil	(Germany) #26 Steve Palmer	(United Kingdom) #28 Dominik Walsh	(Germany) #34 Daniel Del Monte
(Germany) #37 Christian Kohmann	(Germany) #51 Thomas Pielmeier	(Germany) #81 Sven Gerbig	(Germany) #89 Michael Christ
Coaching staff
(Canada) Stéphane Richer (Head coach)		(Germany) Fabian Dahlem (Assistant coach)	

=== DEL Runner-up roster ===
The 1996/97 Kassel roster achieved the best ever result for the Kassel Huskies, finishing German runner-up. The squad consisted of nine Scandinavian players, including Roger Hansson a reigning Olympic champion at the time. The Huskies defeated Starbulls Rosenheim and EHC Eisbären Berlin on the road to the final where they were defeated 3-0 by Adler Mannheim in the best of five series. Kassel packed in a record crowd of over 10,000 people in front of City Hall for the final. Mike Millar and Roger Öhman top scored for Kassel that season with 23 goals each. Öhman also topped Kassel's points tally with 61 points. Gerhard Brunner won the coach of the year award for DEL in what was his debut season in the Deutschen Eishockey Liga.

1996/97 DEL Runners-up Roster
Goaltenders
(Germany) #1 Josef Kontny	(Czech Republic) #29 Pavel Cagaš	(Sweden) #70 Jonas Eriksson	
Defencemen
(Czech Republic) #2 Milan Mokroš	(United States) #4 Venci Sebek	(Finland) #5 Marko Sten	(Germany) #6 Alexander Engel
(Canada) #7 Greg Johnston	(Germany) #8 Alexander Wedl	(Finland) #66 Jouni Vento	(Sweden) #67 Roger Öhman
Forwards
(Canada) #10 Dave Morrison	(Finland) #11 Pekka Peltola	(Canada) #12 Bruce Eakin (C)	(Canada) #13 Mike Millar
(Sweden) #14 Roger Hansson	(Poland) #19 Piotr Kwasigroch	(Slovakia) #20 Branjo Heisig	(Sweden) #21 Jukka-Pekka Seppo
(Canada) #22 Greg Evtushevski	(Germany) #26 Falk Ozellis	(Canada) #27 Daniel Larin	(Germany) #28 Eduard Zam
(Germany) #37 Tino Boos	(Germany) #46 Anton Krinner	(Sweden) #91 Morgan Samuelsson	(Sweden) #97 Robert Burakovsky
Coaching staff
(Germany) Gerhard Brunner (Head coach)

=== Retired numbers ===
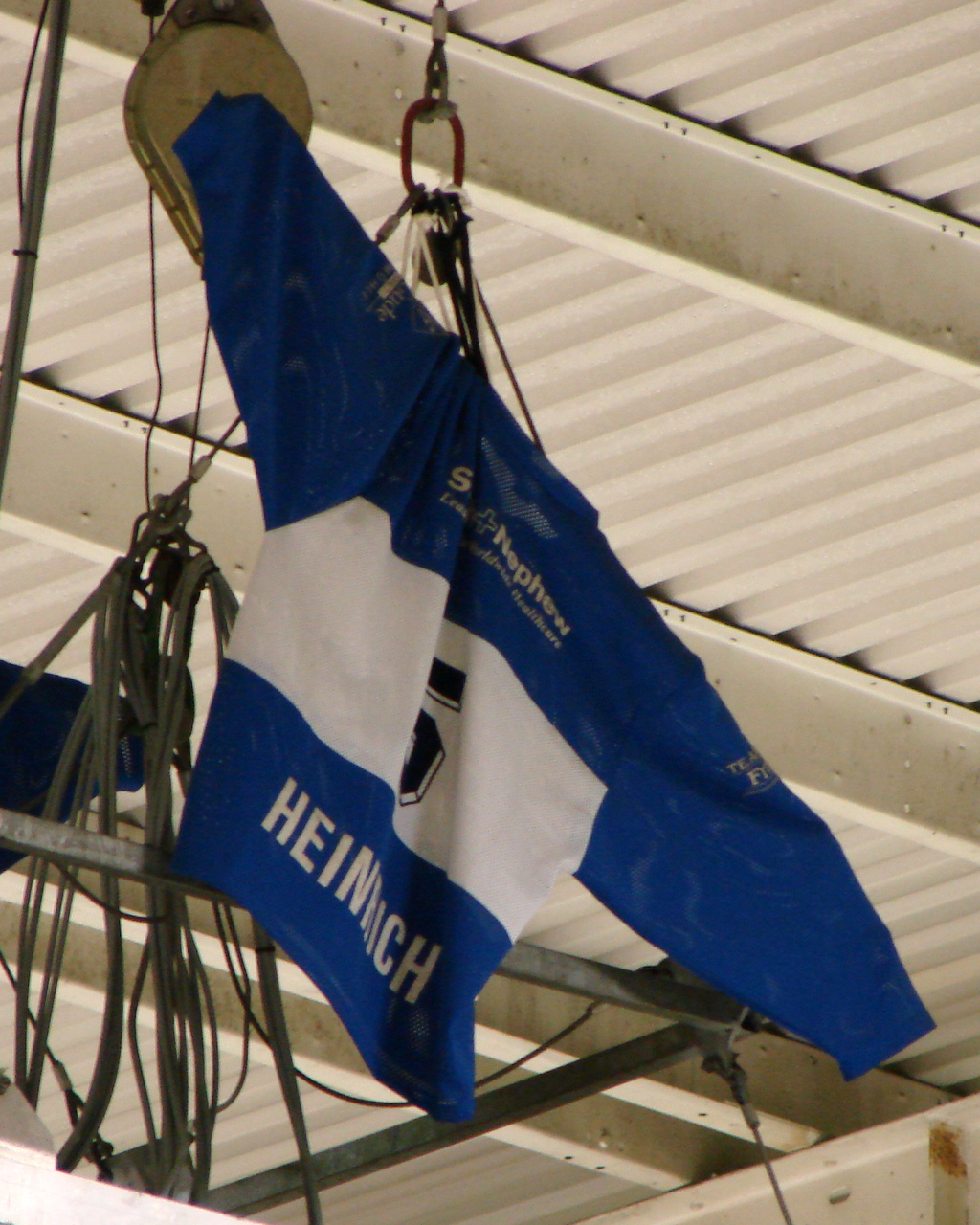
Heinrich retired number being hung up

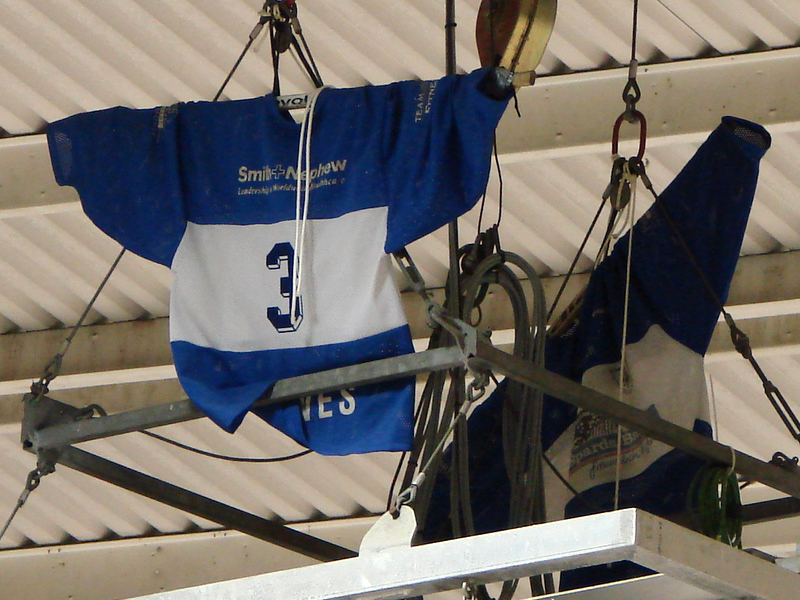
Tarves retired number

Throughout the history of the Kassel Huskies, four jersey numbers have been retired in honour of former club legends. The retired jersey number banners hang from the roof at Eissporthalle Kassel.

- (Czech Republic) Milan Mokroš - # 2
  (1991-1996, Defenseman)
  Milan Mokroš joined Kassel in 1991 and played for the club for six seasons. Mokroš was an instrumental member of the club in reaching its best ever finish of runner-up in the Deutschen Eishockey Liga in 1996/97. Milan remained connected to the club and region upon his playing retirement as he took up a role with the club as head coach of the Kassel Young Huskies. Mokroš filled in as interim head coach of the men's team two times in 1997/98 and 2004/05 and also stepped in to become the full time head coach of the club in 2010/11 when the club was relegated to the Hessenliga (5th tier) following their bankruptcy. Milan lead the team to an undefeated season in the Hessenliga.
- (Canada) Shane Tarves - # 3
  (1982-1992, 2010-2011 Forward)
  Shane ‘the Train’ as he was known played for Kassel for eleven years. His initial 10-year stint between 1982 and 1992 saw the energetic forward score over 300 goals and 600 points for Kassel. He achieved three seasons of scoring over 100 points including one season of 156 points (102 goals, 54 assists) from 36 matches. He retired in 1993 but came out of retirement and returned to assist the Huskies when they were relegated to the Hessenliga in 2010. Contributing 33 points at the age of 55.
- (Germany) Herbert Heinrich - # 5
  (1983-1987, Defenseman)
  West German youth international, Herbert Heinrich played for the Huskies when they were known was ESG Kassel for seven seasons between 1982 and 1990. Heinrich's number 5 jersey was retired at the end of his career with Kassel due to his achievements and commitment to the club. However, his son Alexander was allowed to wear the number during the 2006/07 season to honour his father.
- (Germany) Matthias Kolodziejczak - # 14
  (1985-1991, 2010–2011, Forward)
  Kolodziejczak came to Kassel from Nürnberg in 1985 and became a crowd favourite. The tireless worker from Braunlage made a total of 291 appearances for Kassel during the 80's and 90's. He was captain of the legendary "Eighty-Niners" and came out or retirement and led the team as captain in 2010/11 in the Hessenliga.

=== German Ice Hockey Hall of Famers ===
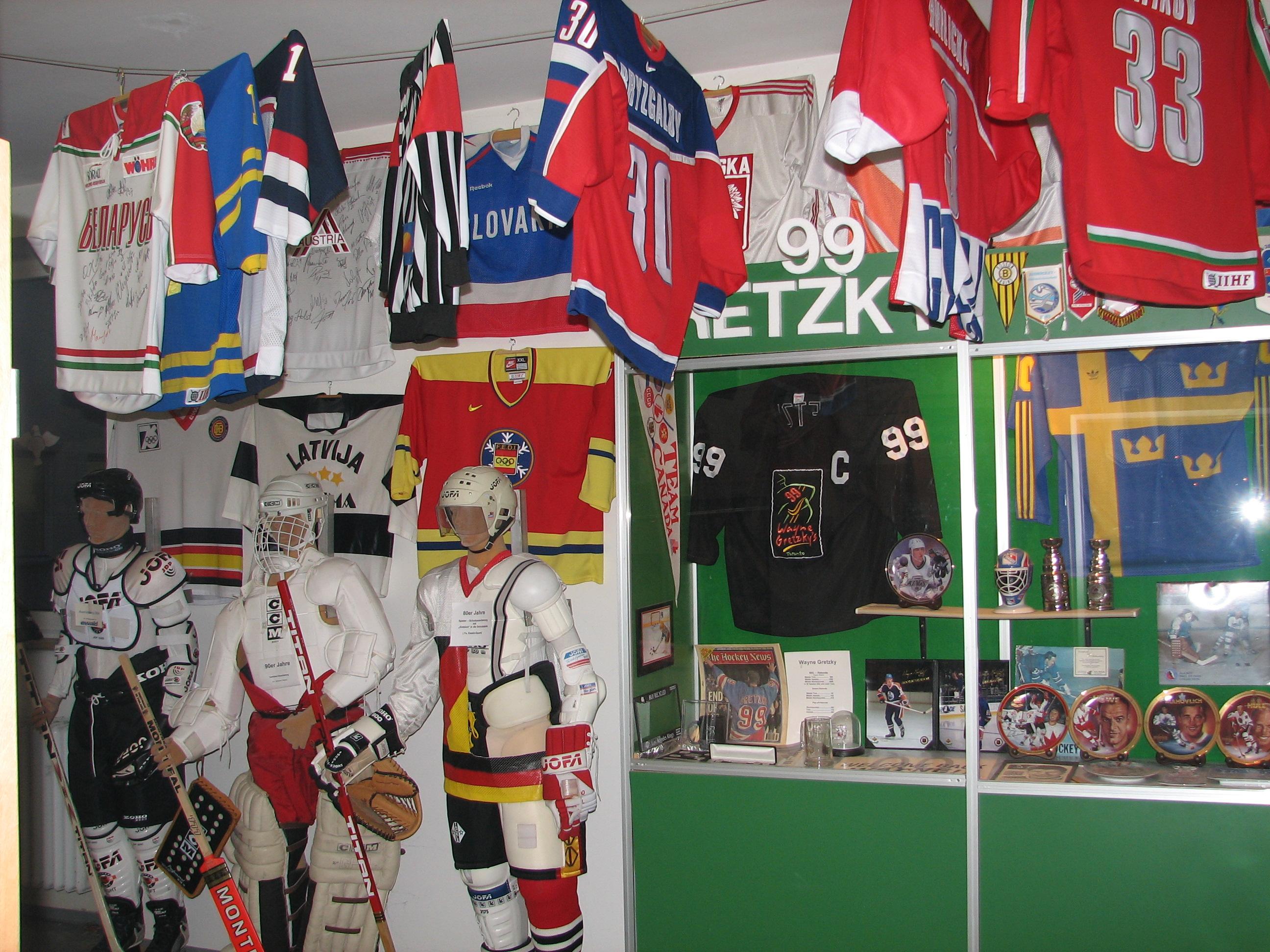
German Museum of ice hockey

Kassel has had four players or coaches who have been inducted into the German Ice Hockey Hall of Fame within the German Ice Hockey Museum in Augsburg, Germany.

- (Germany) Axel Kammerer
  (2000–2002, Assistant coach and 2003/04, Head coach)
  Axel Kammerer was inducted into the German Hockey Hall of Fame in 2000 due to his involvement in the German and West German national team program in the 1980s and 90s including the Olympic Games in 1992. During his time with Kassel, Axel was assistant coach to Hans Zach before becoming the head coach in the 2003/04 season.
- Duanne Moeser
  (1992/93, Forward)
  Duanne Moeser was inducted into the German Hockey Hall of Fame in 2006 for his contribution to the game in Germany. During his playing career he amassed over 1,100 points from 950 matches including 550 goals. The Canadian born German forward had his number retired at Augsburger Panther and he made the DEL All-Star match in 2004 and 2005. Moeser played one season with the Huskies in 1992/93, scoring 29 points from 19 matches.
- (Germany) Jürgen Rumrich
  (1998–2000, Forward)
  Inducted in 2006, Rumrich is a former captain of the German national team who was a veteran of 182 international matches including four Olympic Games. Hans Zach was the catalyst in bringing him to Kassel and the forward spent two seasons with Huskies. During his time with Kassel, he won the Hockey Player Award for Ice Hockey News magazine and became German captain for the first time.
- Hans Zach
  (1995/96 and 1998–2002, Head coach)
  Hans was inducted into the hall of fame in 2000. He played in Germany and represented the national team in a hockey career that spanned two decades, five world championships, one Olympic Games and over 600 professional matches. Hans has an even longer career as a head coach. He spent five seasons as head coach for Kassel while also the head coach of the German national team at the same time. Kassel never finished outside the top five in the German first division while he was in charge.

=== Player records ===
As of 22 August 2021

The following are the top five all-time leaders in five different statistical categories: matches played; goals; assists; points; penalty minutes

All-time Apperiences
#	Name	Pos	MP
1	(Germany) Michael Christ	F	515
2	(Germany) Manuel Klinge	F	514
3	(Germany) Alexander Heinrich	D	507
4	(Germany) Sven Valenti	D	493
5	(Germany) Tobias Abstreiter	F	400

All-time Goals
#	Name	Pos	Gol
1	(Germany) Manuel Klinge	F	244
2	(Germany) Alexander Heinrich	D	117
3	(Germany) Sven Valenti	D	96
4	(Germany) Michael Christ	F	95
5	(Canada) Mike Millar	F	94

All-time Assists
#	Name	Pos	A
1	(Germany) Manuel Klinge	F	321
2	(Germany) Sven Valenti	D	188
3	(Germany) Michael Christ	F	175
4	(Germany) Tobias Abstreiter	F	157
5	(Czech Republic) Petr Sikora	F	155

All-time Points
#	Name	Pos	Pts
1	(Germany) Manuel Klinge	F	565
2	(Germany) Sven Valenti	D	284
3	(Germany) Michael Christ	F	270
4	(Germany) Alexander Heinrich	D	268
5	(Germany) Tobias Abstreiter	F	222

All-time PIM
#	Name	Pos	PIM
1	(Germany) Michael Christ	F	590
2	(Germany) Tobias Abstreiter	D	493
3	(Germany) Sven Valenti	D	466
4	(Germany) Marco Müller	D	410
5	(Germany) Greg Evtushevski	F	388

== Coaches ==
As of 22 August 2021

A list of all head coaches, including interim, the Kassel Huskies have had since the club's inception in 1977.

Manager	Term
(Canada) Danny Coutu	1977–80
(Czechoslovakia) Jaromír Hudek	1980–81
(Germany) Anton Waldmann	1981–82
(Finland) Jorma Siitarinen	1982–83
(Czechoslovakia) Jaro Frycek	1983–88
(Germany) Richard Piechutta	1988–92
(Poland) Jerzy Potz	1992–93
(Canada) Ross Yates	1994–95
(Germany) Hans Zach	1995–96
(Germany) Gerhard Brunner	1996–97

Manager	Term
(Canada) Bill Lochead	1997–98
(Czech Republic) Milan Mokroš	1998
(Germany) Hans Zach	1998–02
(Sweden) Gunnar Leidborg	2002–03
(Germany) Axel Kammerer	2003–04
(Canada) Mike McParland	2004
(Czech Republic) Milan Mokroš	2004–05
(Germany) Bernhard Englbrecht	2005–06
(Canada) Stéphane Richer	2006–10
(Canada) Dean Fedorchuk	2010

Manager	Term
(Czech Republic) Milan Mokroš	2010–11
(Canada) Jamie Bartman	2011–12
(Germany) Ulrich Egen	2012–13
(Poland) Czeslaw Panek	2013
(Germany) Jürgen Rumrich	2013–14
(Canada) Rico Rossi	2014–18
(United States) Bobby Carpenter	2018
(Canada) Tim Kehler	2018–Present

== Club culture ==
=== Supporters ===
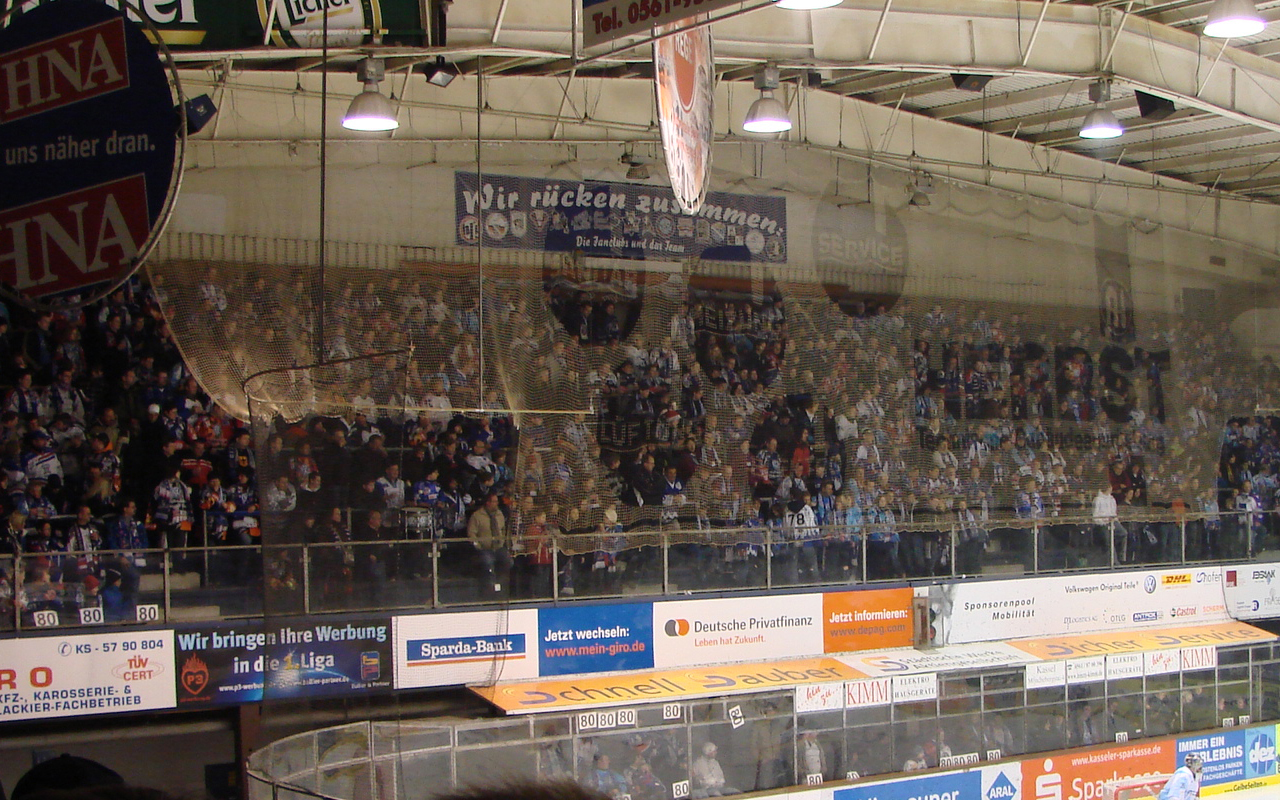
Kassel Huskies Hayloft

In total Kassel Huskies has had 20 official fan clubs. These clubs predominantly come from the northern Hessen region but there is representation in Lower Saxony and eastern Hessen too. There is also a number of unofficial fan groups associated with the Sled Dogs including the Hayloft. The Hayloft consist of the entire terrace behind one of the ends of the stadium. The group has several capos who lead uniformed chants and tifo displays. In 2013/14, the Kassel Huskies depicted the Hayloft on their jersey to underlie the bond between the fans and the club.

The most well-known Kassel Huskies fan, Liesel Burg, died 16 July 2010 at the age of 85 after attending matches and supporting the club for 30 years. She was affectionately known as ‘Granny Liesel’ and was regarded as their most faithful fan. She baked cakes for players of the team every week and was the only women to be granted regular access to the ‘Sled Dog’ crew cabin.

=== Rivalries ===
The cities of Kassel and Frankfurt have long held traditional sporting rivalries across different sports including football and hockey. In football, KSV Hessen Kassel and FSV Frankfurt have a traditional rivalry. In hockey, the Huskies' major rival is the Löwen Frankfurt (formally Frankfurt Lions).

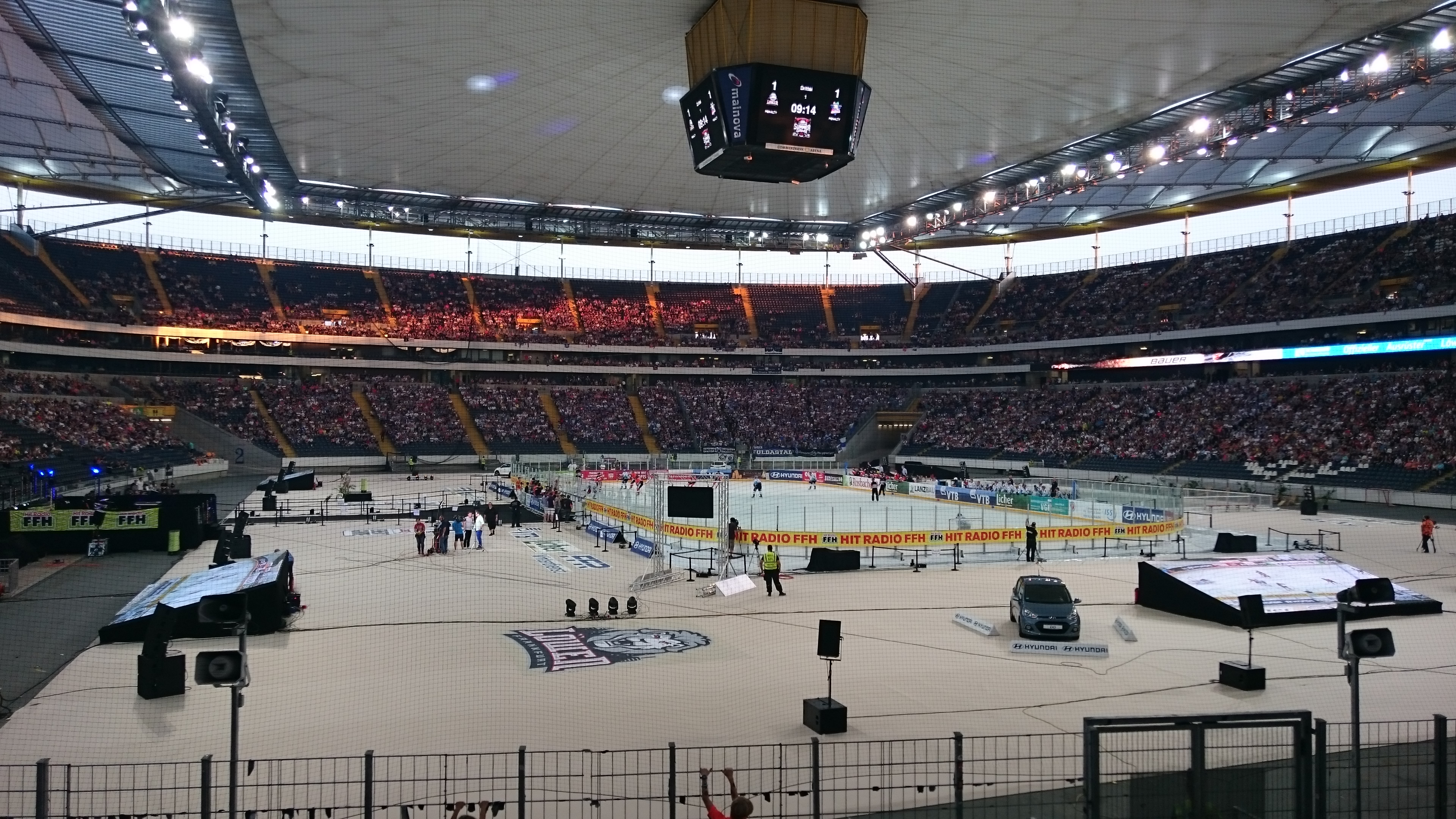
Commerzbank-Arena - Ice Hockey Summer Game 2016

The first match between the two Hessen-based clubs occurred in the 1980/81 season in the Bundesliga. Both teams were incorporated in 1994 and were founding members of the DEL. The two clubs met each other in the play-offs in the first two seasons of the DEL.

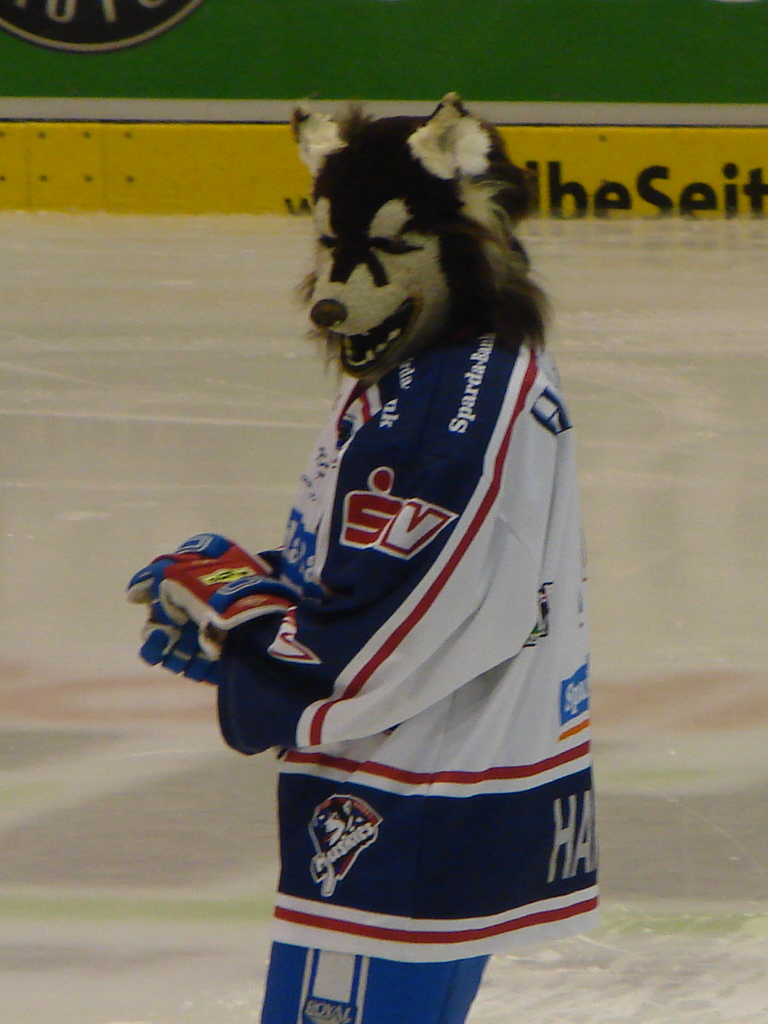
Kassel Huskies pre 2015 Mascot

The most memorable match between the Huskies and the Lions came in December 1997. In front of 6,400 fans crammed into Eissporthalle Kassel, there was a total of 242 penalty minutes, five major penalties and two match penalties handed out by the officials during the match. Things kicked off after 4:18 minutes when Lions goaltender Jukka Tammi clashed with Greg Evtushevski, resulting in the Finnish goaltender being sent off with a match penalty. The first period lasted for almost two hours alone. Kassel went on to win the match 3–1 to please the home fans but Frankfurt coach, Bernie Johnston, was livid with the officiating in his post-match interview stating "we feel too severely punished".

Currently, the two teams compete in the same league, DEL2, and continue this rivalry. In 2016/17 the two teams competed in the first outdoors match in professional hockey in Germany at the Frankfurt Commerzbank Arena in front of 30,000 fans. The Huskies had 8,000 fans travel west for the Hessen derby match. The match was known as the 'DEL2 Summer Game' and Kassel won the match 5–4.

=== Mascot ===
Since 1994, the Siberian Husky has been the mascot for the club. The image of the husky is used by the club in the name, logo and on merchandising. On match-days the club has ‘Hercules’ the Siberian Husky mascot who entertains the spectators before the match, during intermissions and post-match. Hercules also appears at special events hosted by the club. While the husky image has changed a number of times on the club's logo, the mascot has been updated just once, in 2015, with a softer friendlier more 'plush' look to Hercules. The name Hercules is a nod to a local landmark, the Hercules monument at the top of Bergpark Wilhelmshöhe and forms part of the UNESCO World Heritage Site since 2013.

== Venue/Facilities ==
=== Eissporthalle ===
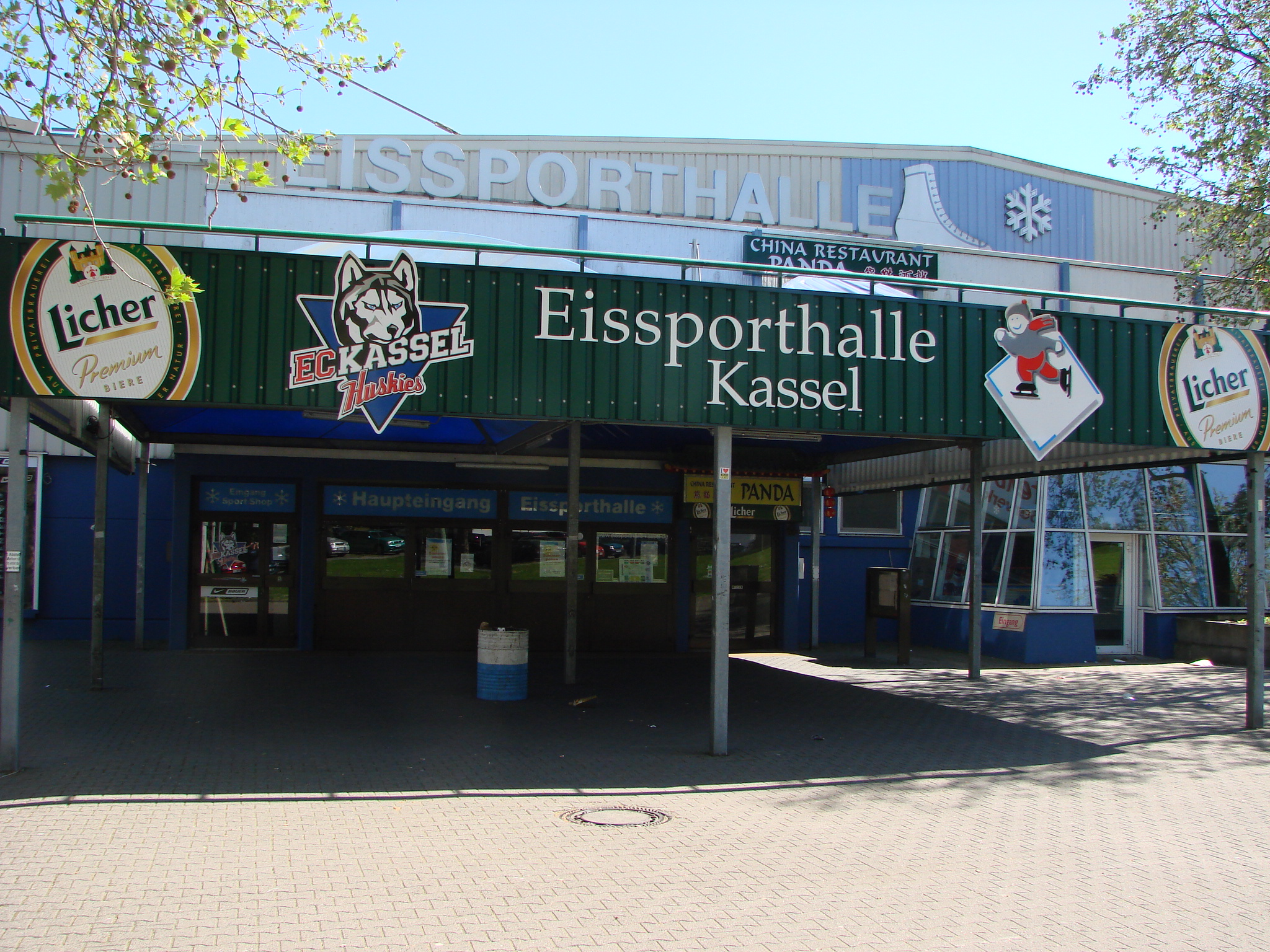
Entrance to the Eissporthalle kassel, 2009

The home venue for the Kassel Huskies is the Eissporthalle. It is the first and only regular venue for Kassel's home matches, having played home to the club since inception on 19 February 1977.

Eissporthall Kassel is located southwest of the Karlsaue park near the western bank of the Fulda river. To the east is the city centre of Kassel and Friedrichsplatz. The venue is co-located with the football and athletics stadium Auestadion.

Kassel's extensive tram network provides transport for game day patrons to the Eissporthall. RT3 or RT5 can be caught to the Auestadion tram stop right outside the ice hockey and football stadiums. There is also bus stops and car parking available nearby.

The venue was designed by Edith and Simon Kimm and opened in 1977. It is operated by Kasseler Sportstätten KG. Its original maximum capacity was 3,000 spectators but in 1995 the stadium went through a redevelopment by architect Peter Blaschke and the capacity was expanded to 6,100 with 2,720 seats and 250 box seats. The large capacity of the stadium for its time meant the Huskies had one of the largest average attendances at the start of the DEL in 1994.

The below table showcases the spectator statistics for the final five seasons in the DEL and DEL2 before the club's bankruptcy in 2010 sent the club back to the fifth division.

Attendance record 2005-10
Season	Matches	Total attendance	Per match
2005/06	29 (26/3)	124,101 (110,538/13,563)	4,279 (4,251/4,521)
2006/07	32 (26/6)	106,276 (77,050/29,226)	3,321 (2,964/4,871)
2007/08	34 (26/8)	122,398 (81,189/41,209)	3,600 (3,123/5,151)
2008/09	26 (26/-)	105,855 (105,855/-)	4,071 (4,071/-)
2009/10	28 (26/-)	93,898 (93,898/-)	3,353 (3,353/-)

Legend: Total (Regular season/play-offs)

=== Nordhessen-Arena ===
For many years there has been talk about a new multi-purpose arena being constructed in Kassel to house both the Kassel Huskies and the Handball-Bundesliga club MT Melsungen. 29 January 2007, saw the Kassel city council vote to release a preliminary development plan for the arena.

The plan detailed a 9,000 to 10,000 capacity arena suitable for both handball and ice hockey. The new arena would cost €40 to €80 million to construct and would be located in the Bettenhausen district of Kassel. The Huskies’ bankruptcy in 2010 put the project on the backburner, however, no formal decision to cancel or proceed with the project has been made by the city council. Car manufacturer, Volkswagen, expressed interest in becoming the naming rights holder of the new arena. As the Huskies are an integral part of getting the project up, they became the major shirt sponsor of the Huskies, signing a long-term deal. This deal was extended in 2017 for a further two seasons.

== Associated clubs/teams ==
1 January 1994, EC Kassel was dissolved and two new clubs were established to take its place. Kassel Huskies, the men's program, was incorporated as a limited liability company to join the new DEL, as per the new rules, while a parent club was established at the same time called Ice Hockey Youth Kassel e.V. to look after and control the junior and women's programs.

=== EJ Kassel Young Huskies ===
The Kassel Young Huskies are the junior club branch of Ice Hockey Youth Kassel e.V. The club consists of seven teams ranging in age and competing in the Bundesliga Nord leagues for their age group. The club was founded 1 January 1994. The head coach for the Young Huskies is Czech coach Milan Mokroš, former Huskies player and men's head coach. Assisting the head coach is another full-time assistant coach and six part-time coaches. Until 2009 the club was known as EJ Kassel. The greatest achievement by the club has been being named 2004 German champions under the guidance of Horst Fahl. Current Kassel Huskies cult hero, Alexander Heinrich, graduated from the Young Huskies.

=== EJ Kassel Ice Cats ===
The Ice Cats are the women's team associated with Ice Hockey Youth Kassel e.V. Founded in 1987 as EC Kassel, the same name as the men's team, they competed in the National League North-East. Between 1994 and 1996 the Ice Cats achieved their highest ever position in the women's German rankings, getting promoted to the second division and finishing runner-up. In 1997 the team was disbanded. In 2007/08 the Ice Cats were resurrected and started competing in the National League Hessen. One year later they finished ahead of Hessen rivals, SG Trier-Bitburg and RSC Darmstadt to be named Hessenmeister. The Ice Cats are coached by Fred Pottek and Kai Sturm.

== Season-by-season-results ==
Champions	Runners-up	Third Place	Promoted	Relegated

Kassel Huskies
Season	League	P	W	OW	OL	L	GF	GA	GD	Pts	Finish	Post season	Top scorer	Pts
1994/95	DEL	44	22	4	1	17	145	138	+7	48	7th	QF	(Canada) Mike Millar	60
1995/96	DEL	50	19	12	2	17	149	148	+1	52	9th	QF	(Canada) Mike Millar	54
1996/97	DEL	50	27	4	1	19	190	167	+23	59	4th	Runner-up	(Canada) Mike Millar	58
1997/98	DEL	44	19	3	4	18	140	128	+12	45	11th	POQ	(Switzerland) Paul DiPietro	50
1998/99	DEL	52	24	4	4	20	165	145	+20	84	9th	-	(Canada) François Guay	53
1999/00	DEL	56	28	2	9	17	168	137	+31	97	4th	SF	(Canada) Sylvain Turgeon	45
2000/01	DEL	60	28	6	7	19	176	156	+20	103	5th	SF	(United States) Pat Mikesch	42
2001/02	DEL	60	26	6	8	20	157	147	+10	98	5th	SF	(Germany) Daniel Kreutzer	46
2002/03	DEL	52	19	7	7	19	118	127	-9	78	7th	QF	(Germany) Alexander Serikow	32
2003/04	DEL	52	16	6	4	26	129	166	-37	64	11th	-	(Austria) Matthias Trattnig	31
2004/05	DEL	52	10	7	8	27	127	173	-46	52	14th	RW	(Canada) Daniel Corso	38
2005/06	DEL	52	15	5	3	29	137	179	-42	58	13th	Relegated	(Canada) Jason Ulmer	52
2006/07	2.BUN	52	37	4	1	10	203	113	+90	120	1st	Runner-up	(Canada) Shawn McNeil	65
2007/08	2.BUN	52	36	6	2	8	186	114	+72	122	1st	Champions	(Canada) Shawn McNeil	55
2008/09	DEL	52	15	8	4	25	147	171	-24	65	14th	-	(Canada) Alex Leavitt	54
2009/10	DEL	56	16	2	4	34	151	213	-62	56	15th	-	(Canada) Josh Soares	56
EC Kassel Huskies
Season	League	P	W	OW	OL	L	GF	GA	GD	Pts	Finish	Post season	Top scorer	Pts
2010/11	HL	16	16	0	0	0	266	23	+243	48	1st	Champions	(Germany) Patrick Berendt	77
2011/12	OL	42	27	2	1	12	250	122	+128	86	3rd	-	(Czech Republic) Petr Sikora	100
2012/13	OL	42	35	4	1	2	357	80	+277	114	1st	Runner-up	(Czech Republic) Petr Sikora	107
2013/14	OL	58	40	2	4	12	352	151	+201	128	1st	Runner-up	(Canada) Kyle Doyle	84
2014/15	DEL2	52	27	5	6	14	197	140	+57	97	3rd	QF	(United States) Mike Collins	81
2015/16	DEL2	52	23	8	7	14	201	164	+37	92	4th	Champions	(Canada) Jamie MacQueen	70
2016/17	DEL2	52	28	5	2	17	161	147	+14	96	3rd	SF	(Germany) Manuel Klinge	50
2017/18	DEL2	52	21	8	5	18	180	160	+20	84	6th	QF	(Canada) Braden Pimm	63
2018/19	DEL2	52	22	3	3	24	146	145	+1	75	7th	POQ	(Germany) Richard Mueller	51
2019/20	DEL2	52	27	3	5	17	191	147	+44	92	2nd	N/A	(Canada) Ben Duffy	58
2020/21	DEL2	49	32	6	4	7	210	108	+102	112	1st	Runner-up	(Germany) Ryon Moser	65
