= Tim Kehler =

Canadian professional ice hockey coach (born 1971)

Tim Kehler, 2026

Tim Kehler (born July 5, 1971) is a Canadian professional ice hockey coach. He most recently served as head coach of the Bietigheim Steelers in Germany.

== Career ==
Born in Victoria, British Columbia, Kehler began his career behind the bench in 2002-03 as head coach of the North Delta Flyers of the PIJHL, followed by a stint as assistant coach of the BCHL’s Surrey Eagles the following season.

From 2004 to 2007, he served as head coach and general manager of fellow BCHL side Trail Smoke Eaters. From 2007 to 2010, Kehler was a member of the coaching staff of WHL’s Swift Current Broncos as an assistant.

The 2010-11 campaign saw him stand at the helm of the Salmon Arm Silverbacks of the BCHL, serving as head coach and general manager.

He accepted the position as head coach of Hungarian side Miskolci Jegesmedve JSE for the 2012-13 season and also worked for the Hungarian federation, serving as assistant coach of the Hungarian Men’s National Team and head coach of the under-20 National Team.

In 2013, Kehler was appointed head coach of German third-division side Löwen Frankfurt. He guided the club to promotion to the second division in his first season at the helm including a record-breaking run of 49 straight wins. In the 2014-15 season, he coached the Lions to a playoff-semifinal appearance in their first year in the DEL2. Kehler and the Löwen team parted company in December 2015 after a run of five losses in eight games.

He was named assistant to head coach Greg Poss at EC Red Bull Salzburg of the Austrian Hockey League in July 2016. He stayed there until the end of the 2017-18 season. In November 2018, Kehler signed with the Kassel Huskies of the German DEL2, where he worked alongside Bobby Carpenter as a coaching duo, on December 18, 2018, Carpenter was sacked and Kehler remained at Kassel as head coach.

From May 2022 to January 12, 2023, Kehler served as head coach of DEL2 side Ravensburg Towerstars.
