= Rico Rossi (ice hockey) =

Canadian-Italian ice hockey player

Rico Rossi (born June 22, 1965) is a Canadian-Italian professional ice hockey coach and a former player.

== Playing career ==
Born in Toronto, Ontario, Rossi attended Northeastern University from 1985 to 1989. He was named the team's Rookie of the Year in 1986 and played a total of 135 games for NU in his four-year NCAA career.

A Canadian of Italian descent, he spent his pro career almost entirely in Italy with the Hockey Club Milan, except the 1992–93 season, when he made 39 appearances for CHL's Dallas Freeze. Rossi played a total of five years for Milan, claiming three Italian championship titles, he retired in 1995.

== Coaching career ==
In Rossi's single season (1996–97) at the helm, HC Milan made it to the Serie A finals. He then took over EHC Nordhorn from Germany, coaching the team starting 1997, before signing with German third-division side EV Duisburg during the 1998–99 season. Rossi served as Duisburg head coach until 2001, followed by a one-year stint at fellow third-division club ESV Bayreuth.

The 2002-03 campaign saw him move to Germany's top-flight, Deutsche Eishockey Liga (DEL): Rossi joined the Adler Mannheim coaching staff as an assistant and left after two years to take over German third-division team Heilbronner Falken as head coach. In his nine-year tenure, Rossi led the Falcons to promotion to Germany's second-tier. In 2013–14, he served as sport director of the club.

Prior to the 2014–15 season, he accepted the head coach position with German DEL2 outfit Kassel Huskies. In the 2015–16 season, Rossi guided the Huskies to the DEL2 championship title. Following a bad start to the season, he resigned as Head Coach in October 2018 and was reassigned to be sporting director.

== Personal life ==
Rico Rossi has a daughter, Nicole Rossi who has recently involved herself in rep soccer and is hoping to pursue a successful soccer career. Rico also has a son named Rico Junior who is following the hockey lifestyle like his father.
