= 2014–15 DEL2 season =

- League: DEL2
- Sport: Ice Hockey
- Number of games: 364 (52 per team)
- Number of teams: 14

Regular season
- Season champions: Bietigheim Steelers

Finals
- Champions: Bietigheim Steelers
- Runners-up: Fischtown Pinguins

DEL2 seasons
- ← 2013–14 2015–16 →

The 2014–15 DEL2 season was the second season of operation for the DEL2 (also known as DEL II). Replacing the 2nd Bundesliga, this league represents the second-level of ice hockey in Germany, below the Deutsche Eishockey Liga (DEL). The league operated with 14 teams during the 2014–15 season.

The league was won by the Bietigheim Steelers who also were the regular season winners and defeated the previous season's champions, the Fischtown Pinguins, in the finals.

== Regular season ==
The regular season saw one two new club in the league, Löwen Frankfurt EC Kassel Huskies, the league having expanded from 12 to 14 teams.

Pos	Team	Pld	W	OTW	OTL	L	GF	GA	GD	Pts	Qualification
1	Bietigheim Steelers (C)	52	34	3	6	9	227	151	+76	114	Advanced to playoffs
2	Fischtown Pinguins	52	29	5	2	16	182	147	+35	99	Advanced to playoffs
3	EC Kassel Huskies	52	27	5	6	14	197	140	+57	97	Advanced to playoffs
4	Löwen Frankfurt	52	29	3	4	16	219	150	+69	97	Advanced to playoffs
5	Ravensburg Towerstars	52	26	3	4	19	186	174	+12	88	Advanced to playoffs
6	EV Landshut (Note: EV Landshut was refused a licence for the 2015–16 season and expelled from the league. For this reason Heilbronner Falken, nominally relegated, remained in the league.) (R)	52	25	3	3	21	174	162	+12	84	Advanced to playoffs
7	SC Riessersee	52	21	6	6	19	158	143	+15	81	Advanced to pre-playoffs
8	Starbulls Rosenheim	52	21	7	4	20	157	150	+7	81	Advanced to pre-playoffs
9	Lausitzer Füchse	52	22	4	3	23	181	184	−3	77	Advanced to pre-playoffs
10	Dresdner Eislöwen	52	22	3	5	22	171	187	−16	77	Advanced to pre-playoffs
11	EC Bad Nauheim	52	16	11	4	21	167	179	−12	74	Advanced to play-downs
12	Eispiraten Crimmitschau	52	17	2	4	29	177	203	−26	59	Advanced to play-downs
13	Heilbronner Falken	52	10	1	2	39	119	224	−105	34	Advanced to play-downs
14	ESV Kaufbeuren	52	8	1	4	39	123	244	−121	30	Advanced to play-downs

Source: kicker.de
Rules for classification: 1) points; 2) head-to-head points; 3) head-to-head goal difference; 4) head-to-head number of goals scored.
(C) Champion; (R) Relegated

== Playoffs ==
=== Championship ===
The championship play-offs:

First round
7	SC Riessersee	1
10	Dresdner Eislöwen	2
8	Starbulls Rosenheim	2
9	Lausitzer Füchse	1

Quarterfinals
1	Bietigheim Steelers	4
10	Dresdner Eislöwen	0
3	EC Kassel Huskies	1
6	EV Landshut	4
2	Fischtown Pinguins	4
8	Starbulls Rosenheim	0
4	Löwen Frankfurt	4
5	Ravensburg	0

Semifinals
1	Bietigheim Steelers	4
6	EV Landshut	0
(Pairings are re-seeded after the first and second round)
2	Fischtown Pinguins	4
4	Löwen Frankfurt	2

Finals
1	Bietigheim Steelers	4
2	Fischtown Pinguins	2

=== Relegation ===
The relegation play-offs:

Semifinals
9	EC Bad Nauheim	4
12	ESV Kaufbeuren	2
10	Eispiraten Crimmitschau	4
11	Heilbronner Falken	1

Finals
12	ESV Kaufbeuren	4
11	Heilbronner Falken	2
