= German Cup (ice hockey) =

The German Cup (German: Deutscher Eishockey-Pokal) is the national ice hockey cup competition in Germany. It was first contested in 2003.

== Champions ==
- 2003 : Adler Mannheim
- 2004 : Kölner Haie
- 2005 : ERC Ingolstadt
- 2006 : DEG Metro Stars
- 2007 : Adler Mannheim
- 2008 : Eisbären Berlin
- 2009 : Grizzly Adams Wolfsburg
- 2010 : EHC München
- 2011 : Starbulls Rosenheim
- 2012 : Bietigheim Steelers
- 2013 : Bietigheim Steelers
