= Sebastian Elwing =

German ice hockey player

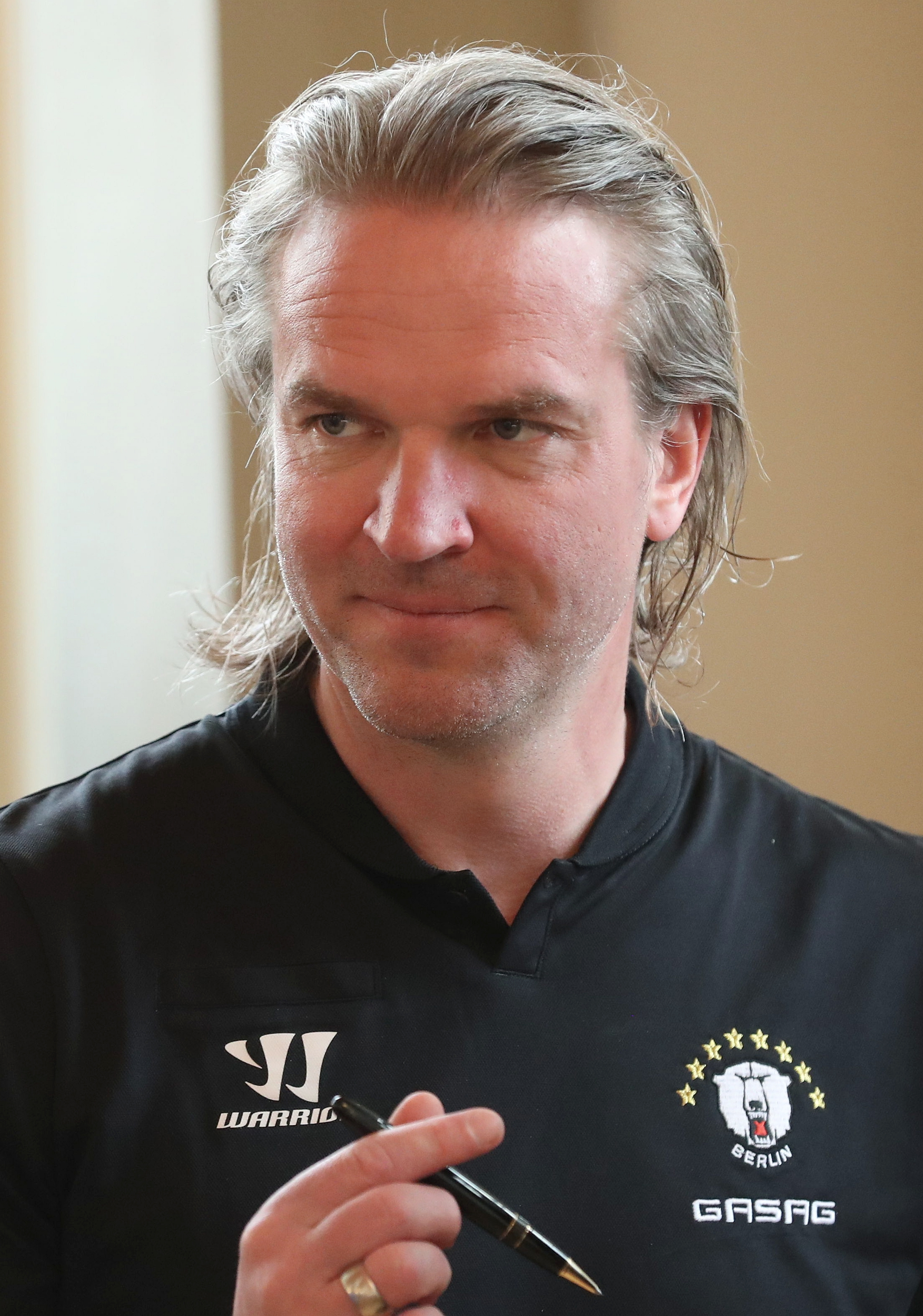
- Born: March 5, 1980 (age 45); Berlin, Germany
- Height: 1.84 m (6 ft 0 in)
- Weight: 87 kg (192 lb; 13 st 10 lb)
- Position: Goaltender
- Catches: Left
- DEL team Former teams: Eisbären Berlin; Kassel Huskies; EHC München
- National team: Germany
- NHL draft: Undrafted
- Playing career: 1999–present

Sebastian Elwing (born March 5, 1980) is a former German professional ice hockey goaltender. He was playing for Eisbären Berlin in the Deutsche Eishockey Liga (DEL). Elwing returned to Berlin after spending the previous four years with EHC München.

Nowadays he runs his own Hockey Goaltending School in Weisswasser named Torwartschule Elwing and is the official Goalie-Coach of the DEL Pro-Team Eisbären Berlin.
