= Elwing (band) =

Greek power metal band

Elwing is a Greek power metal band. Active in the early 2000s, the band became known for the 2005 album War.

The band formed in 2000 as Merlin before changing names after Elwing in Tolkien's universe. The band released Immortal Stories in 2002, noted for having cover art by Ken Kelly.

In early 2005, their signing with Greek label Black Lotus Records was anonunced. Here, they released War in the summer of 2005. Vampster opined that Elwing had made a "solid, timeless album", befitting listeners who thought bands like Hammerfall had veered to far from the genre and into "modern children's carnival pop". The singer delivered no "inhumanly high vocal lines", but instead had an "exceptionally deep and throaty" voice. War was not "the album of the year", however, and suffered from "rather unimaginative riffs". Metal Temple gave an 8.

War reminded the reviewer in Scream Magazine of Running Wild, and was even a better album than Running Wild's latest output. The production was "solid and powerful". As the album progressed, the songwriting became predictable, especially keeping the same tempo over a prolonged period. The overall score was only 3 out of 6. Rock Hard gave a similar score with 6.5.

Powermetal.de lambasted Elwing for lacking originality. War was immediately branded as "kitsch" and "a worthless copy" because the "epic speed/power metal" genre had "been done to death" and "exhausted beyond recognition". The band did not "exude even a hint of innovation". Among the individual band members, the vocalist was singled out as unimpressive, as "his vocal range isn't exactly the best".
