= HMAS Elwing =

History

Australia
- Name: Elwing
- Owner: Rockhampton Harbour Board

History

Australia
- Name: Elwing
- Commissioned: 16 June 1942

General characteristics
- Type: Tug boat
- Tonnage: 47 gross tons

HMAS Elwing (W129, FY42) was a tug boat operated by the Royal Australian Navy (RAN) during World War II.

== Operational history ==
Built in Rockhampton, Queensland for the Rockhampton Harbour Board, she was requisitioned by the RAN on 16 June 1942.
