= Axel Kammerer =

German ice hockey player

Personal information
- Nationality: German
- Born: 21 July 1964 (age 60); Bad Tölz, West Germany

Sport
- Sport: Ice hockey

Axel Kammerer (born 21 July 1964) is a German former ice hockey player. He competed in the men's tournament at the 1992 Winter Olympics.
