= 2003–04 DEL season =

2003-04 Deutsche Eishockey Liga season
- League: Deutsche Eishockey Liga
- Sport: Ice hockey
- Teams: 14

2003-04
- Season champions: Frankfurt Lions

DEL seasons
- ← 2002–03 2004–05 →

The 2003–04 Deutsche Eishockey Liga season was the 10th season since the founding of the Deutsche Eishockey Liga (German Ice Hockey League). The Frankfurt Lions became German Champions, and the Wölfe Freiburg (Freiburg Wolves) were relegated back to the 2. Bundesliga after a single season.

A visible change for the fans was the league corporate sponsorship by the German Yellow Pages (Gelbe Seiten) who signed a 3-year agreement, later extended ending 2009.

== Regular season ==
The regular season start was on September 4, 2003. The first 8 teams qualified for the playoffs, the last two are to go into playdowns, to determine which team will be relegated.

| | Team | GP | Win | SOW | SOL | Lost | GF:GA | Points |
|---|---|---|---|---|---|---|---|---|
| 1. | Eisbären Berlin | 52 | 29 | 5 | 6 | 12 | 171:126 | 103 |
| 2. | Nürnberg Ice Tigers | 52 | 26 | 8 | 2 | 16 | 179:128 | 96 |
| 3. | Hamburg Freezers | 52 | 28 | 4 | 3 | 17 | 151:115 | 95 |
| 4. | Kölner Haie | 52 | 26 | 3 | 9 | 14 | 160:134 | 93 |
| 5. | Frankfurt Lions | 52 | 26 | 5 | 4 | 17 | 177:148 | 92 |
| 6. | Adler Mannheim | 52 | 26 | 4 | 6 | 16 | 151:124 | 92 |
| 7. | ERC Ingolstadt | 52 | 28 | 3 | 2 | 19 | 132:118 | 92 |
| 8. | DEG Metro Stars | 52 | 24 | 4 | 2 | 22 | 141:129 | 82 |
| 9. | Augsburger Panther | 52 | 21 | 5 | 5 | 21 | 180:177 | 78 |
| 10. | Krefeld Pinguine | 52 | 16 | 6 | 4 | 26 | 127:149 | 64 |
| 11. | Kassel Huskies | 52 | 16 | 6 | 4 | 26 | 129:166 | 64 |
| 12. | Iserlohn Roosters | 52 | 14 | 5 | 7 | 26 | 137:169 | 59 |
| 13. | Hannover Scorpions | 52 | 13 | 2 | 5 | 32 | 127:175 | 48 |
| 14. | Wölfe Freiburg | 52 | 7 | 4 | 5 | 36 | 142:241 | 34 |

GP = Games Played; SOW = Shootout win; SOL = Shootout loss; GF:GA = Goals for and against
Color code: = Direct Playoff qualification, = Season ends, = Playdown/Relegation

== Playdowns ==
The two lowest placed teams Hannover Scorpions and Wölfe Freiburg played a Best-of-seven series play-down starting March 10, 2004.

| | | | Game | 1 | 2 | 3 | 4 | 5 | 6 | 7 |
|---|---|---|---|---|---|---|---|---|---|---|
| Hannover Scorpions | – | Wölfe Freiburg | 4:1 | 5:2 | 2:6 | 2:1 OT | 4:0 | 1:0 | – | – |

OT = Overtime

The Wölfe Freiburg had to leave the DEL after only one season, returning to the 2. Bundesliga.

== Playoffs ==
Quarterfinals
1 | Eisbären Berlin | 4
8. | DEG Metro Stars | 0
2. | Nürnberg Ice Tigers | 2
7. | ERC Ingolstadt | 4
3. | Hamburg Freezers | 4
6. | Adler Mannheim | 2
4. | Kölner Haie | 2
5. | Frankfurt Lions | 4

Semifinals
1. | Eisbären Berlin | 3
7. | ERC Ingolstadt | 0
3. | Hamburg Freezers | 2
5. | Frankfurt Lions | 3

Finals
1. | Eisbären Berlin | 1
5. | Frankfurt Lions | 3
