= List of German ice hockey champions =

The German champions in the sport of ice hockey since 1912.

== German champions (men's) ==
=== 1912–1948: German Ice Hockey Championship ===
- 1912 – Berliner Schlittschuhclub
- 1913 – Berliner Schlittschuhclub
- 1914 – Berliner Schlittschuhclub
- 1915–1919 – not played due to World War I
- 1920 – Berliner Schlittschuhclub
- 1921 – Berliner Schlittschuhclub
- 1922 – MTV München
- 1923 – Berliner Schlittschuhclub
- 1924 – Berliner Schlittschuhclub
- 1925 – Berliner Schlittschuhclub
- 1926 – Berliner Schlittschuhclub
- 1927 – SC Riessersee
- 1928 – Berliner Schlittschuhclub
- 1929 – Berliner Schlittschuhclub
- 1930 – Berliner Schlittschuhclub
- 1931 – Berliner Schlittschuhclub
- 1932 – Berliner Schlittschuhclub
- 1933 – Berliner Schlittschuhclub
- 1934 – SC Brandenburg Berlin
- 1935 – SC Riessersee
- 1936 – Berliner Schlittschuhclub
- 1937 – Berliner Schlittschuhclub
- 1938 – SC Riessersee
- 1939 – Engelmann Wien
- 1940 – Wiener EG
- 1941 – SC Riessersee
- 1942 – not completed
- 1943 – not completed
- 1944 – Berliner Schlittschuhclub/SC Brandenburg Berlin
- 1945 – not played
- 1946 – no official championship
- 1947 – SC Riessersee
- 1948 – SC Riessersee

=== 1949–1990: DDR-Oberliga (East Germany) ===
Until 1990, the DDR-Oberliga covered only East Germany. After the reunification of Germany, DDR-Oberliga's clubs joined Bundesliga.

- 1949 – SG Frankenhausen
- 1950 – SG Frankenhausen
- 1951 – Eissport Weißwasser
- 1951–52 – BSG Ostglas Weißwasser
- 1952–53 – SG Dynamo Weißwasser
- 1954–55 – SG Dynamo Weißwasser
- 1955–56 – SG Dynamo Weißwasser
- 1956–57 – SG Dynamo Weißwasser
- 1957–58 – SG Dynamo Weißwasser
- 1958–59 – SG Dynamo Weißwasser
- 1959–60 – SG Dynamo Weißwasser
- 1960–61 – SG Dynamo Weißwasser
- 1961–62 – SG Dynamo Weißwasser
- 1962–63 – SG Dynamo Weißwasser
- 1963–64 – SG Dynamo Weißwasser
- 1964–65 – SG Dynamo Weißwasser
- 1965–66 – SC Dynamo Berlin
- 1966–67 – SC Dynamo Berlin
- 1967–68 – SC Dynamo Berlin
- 1968–69 – SG Dynamo Weißwasser
- 1969–70 – SG Dynamo Weißwasser
- 1970–71 – SG Dynamo Weißwasser
- 1971–72 – SG Dynamo Weißwasser
- 1972–73 – SG Dynamo Weißwasser
- 1973–74 – SG Dynamo Weißwasser
- 1974–75 – SG Dynamo Weißwasser
- 1975–76 – SC Dynamo Berlin
- 1976–77 – SC Dynamo Berlin
- 1977–78 – SC Dynamo Berlin
- 1978–79 – SC Dynamo Berlin
- 1979–80 – SC Dynamo Berlin
- 1980–81 – SG Dynamo Weißwasser
- 1981–82 – SC Dynamo Berlin
- 1982–83 – SC Dynamo Berlin
- 1983–84 – SC Dynamo Berlin
- 1984–85 – SC Dynamo Berlin
- 1985–86 – SC Dynamo Berlin
- 1986–87 – SC Dynamo Berlin
- 1987–88 – SC Dynamo Berlin
- 1988–89 – SG Dynamo Weißwasser
- 1989–90 – SG Dynamo Weißwasser

=== 1949–1958: Eishockey-Oberliga (West Germany) ===
- 1948–49 – EV Füssen
- 1949–50 – SC Riessersee
- 1950–51 – Preußen Krefeld
- 1951–52 – Krefelder EV
- 1952–53 – EV Füssen
- 1953–54 – EV Füssen
- 1954–55 – EV Füssen
- 1955–56 – EV Füssen
- 1956–57 – EV Füssen
- 1957–58 – EV Füssen

=== 1959–1994: Eishockey-Bundesliga (West Germany) ===
Until 1990, the Bundesliga covered only West Germany. After the reunification of Germany, Bundesliga was joined by clubs from DDR-Oberliga.

- 1958–59 – EV Füssen
- 1959–60 – SC Riessersee
- 1960–61 – EV Füssen
- 1961–62 – EC Bad Tölz
- 1962–63 – EV Füssen
- 1963–64 – EV Füssen
- 1964–65 – EV Füssen
- 1965–66 – EC Bad Tölz
- 1966–67 – Düsseldorfer EG
- 1967–68 – EV Füssen
- 1968–69 – EV Füssen
- 1969–70 – EV Landshut
- 1970–71 – EV Füssen
- 1971–72 – Düsseldorfer EG
- 1972–73 – EV Füssen
- 1973–74 – Berliner Schlittschuhclub
- 1974–75 – Düsseldorfer EG
- 1975–76 – Berliner Schlittschuhclub
- 1976–77 – Kölner EC
- 1977–78 – SC Riessersee
- 1978–79 – Kölner EC
- 1979–80 – Mannheimer ERC
- 1980–81 – SC Riessersee
- 1981–82 – SB Rosenheim
- 1982–83 – EV Landshut
- 1983–84 – Kölner EC
- 1984–85 – SB Rosenheim
- 1985–86 – Kölner EC
- 1986–87 – Kölner EC
- 1987–88 – Kölner EC
- 1988–89 – SB Rosenheim
- 1989–90 – Düsseldorfer EG
- 1990–91 – Düsseldorfer EG
- 1991–92 – Düsseldorfer EG
- 1992–93 – Düsseldorfer EG
- 1993–94 – EC Hedos München

=== 1995–present: Deutsche Eishockey Liga ===
- 1994–95 – Kölner Haie
- 1995–96 – Düsseldorfer EG
- 1996–97 – Adler Mannheim
- 1997–98 – Adler Mannheim
- 1998–99 – Adler Mannheim
- 1999–2000 – Munich Barons
- 2000–01 – Adler Mannheim
- 2001–02 – Kölner Haie
- 2002–03 – Krefeld Pinguine
- 2003–04 – Frankfurt Lions
- 2004–05 – Eisbären Berlin
- 2005–06 – Eisbären Berlin
- 2006–07 – Adler Mannheim
- 2007–08 – Eisbären Berlin
- 2008–09 – Eisbären Berlin
- 2009–10 – Hannover Scorpions
- 2010–11 – Eisbären Berlin
- 2011–12 – Eisbären Berlin
- 2012–13 – Eisbären Berlin
- 2013–14 – ERC Ingolstadt
- 2014–15 – Adler Mannheim
- 2015–16 – EHC Red Bull München
- 2016–17 – EHC Red Bull München
- 2017–18 – EHC Red Bull München
- 2018–19 – Adler Mannheim
- 2019–20 – not completed
- 2020–21 – Eisbären Berlin
- 2021–22 – Eisbären Berlin
- 2022–23 – EHC Red Bull München
- 2023–24 – Eisbären Berlin
- 2024–25 – Eisbären Berlin
- 2025–26 – Eisbären Berlin

Notes:

- 2019–20 season was stopped after regular season due to COVID-19 pandemic. EHC Red Bull München won the regular season and qualified for the 2020–21 Champions Hockey League season.

== German champions (women's) ==
=== 1984–1988: Fraueneishockey-Endrunde ===
- 1983–84 – ESG Esslingen
- 1984–85 – EHC Eisbären Düsseldorf
- 1985–86 – EHC Eisbären Düsseldorf
- 1986–87 – EHC Eisbären Düsseldorf
- 1987–88 – Mannheimer ERC WildCats

=== 1989–present: German women's ice hockey Bundesliga ===
- 1988–89 – EHC Eisbären Düsseldorf
- 1989–90 – Mannheimer ERC WildCats
- 1990–91 – OSC Berlin
- 1991–92 – Mannheimer ERC WildCats
- 1992–93 – Neusser EC
- 1993–94 – TuS Geretsried
- 1994–95 – ESG Esslingen
- 1995–96 – ESG Esslingen
- 1996–97 – ESG Esslingen
- 1997–98 – ESG Esslingen
- 1998–99 – Mannheimer ERC WildCats
- 1999–2000 – Mannheimer ERC WildCats
- 2000–01 – TV Kornwestheim
- 2001–02 – TV Kornwestheim
- 2002–03 – TV Kornwestheim
- 2003–04 – TV Kornwestheim
- 2004–05 – EC Bergkamener Bären
- 2005–06 – OSC Berlin
- 2006–07 – OSC Berlin
- 2007–08 – ESC Planegg-Würmtal
- 2008–09 – OSC Berlin
- 2009–10 – OSC Berlin
- 2010–11 – ESC Planegg-Würmtal
- 2011–12 – ESC Planegg-Würmtal
- 2012–13 – ESC Planegg-Würmtal
- 2013–14 – ESC Planegg-Würmtal
- 2014–15 – ESC Planegg-Würmtal
- 2015–16 – ECDC Memmingen
- 2016–17 – ESC Planegg-Würmtal
- 2017–18 – ECDC Memmingen
- 2018–19 – ECDC Memmingen
- 2019–20 – not completed
- 2020–21 – ESC Planegg-Würmtal
- 2021–22 – ERC Ingolstadt
- 2022–23 – ECDC Memmingen

Notes:

- 2019–20 season was cancelled during the finals due to COVID-19 pandemic. ESC Planegg-Würmtal and ECDC Memmingen played in the finals, but no champion was named.

== See also ==
- Austrian champions (ice hockey)
- Ice hockey in Germany
- German Cup (ice hockey)
