= 1989–90 DDR-Oberliga (ice hockey) season =

1989–90 DDR-Oberliga season
- League: DDR-Oberliga
- Sport: Ice Hockey
- Games: 12
- Teams: 2

Regular season

Finals
- Champions: SG Dynamo Weißwasser

DDR-Oberliga seasons
- ← 1988–89 1990–91 →

The 1989–90 DDR-Oberliga season was the 42nd and final season of the DDR-Oberliga, the top level of ice hockey in East Germany. Two teams participated in the league, and SG Dynamo Weißwasser won the championship.

Location of teams in the 1989–90 DDR-Oberliga

== Participating teams ==
Club	Location	Stadium	Capacity
SC Dynamo Berlin	Berlin	Wellblechpalast	4,695
SG Dynamo Weißwasser	Weißwasser	Eisstadion Weißwasser	2,750

== Standings ==
R		GP	W	T	L	GF	GA	Pts
1	SG Dynamo Weißwasser	12	9	0	3	54	41	18
2	SC Dynamo Berlin	12	3	0	9	41	54	6

=== 1st series ===
Dynamo Weißwasser	4–2	Dynamo Berlin	Weißwasser

Dynamo Berlin	4–5 OT	Dynamo Weißwasser	Berlin

Dynamo Weißwasser	3–2 OT	Dynamo Berlin	Weißwasser

Dynamo Weißwasser won series 3–0

=== 2nd series ===
Dynamo Berlin	3–4	Dynamo Weißwasser	Berlin

Dynamo Weißwasser	3–2	Dynamo Berlin	Weißwasser

Dynamo Berlin	2–6	Dynamo Weißwasser	Berlin

Dynamo Weißwasser won series 3–0

=== 3rd series ===
Dynamo Weißwasser	2–3	Dynamo Berlin	Weißwasser

Dynamo Berlin	6–2	Dynamo Weißwasser	Berlin

Dynamo Weißwasser	3–4	Dynamo Berlin	Weißwasser

Dynamo Berlin won series 3–0

=== 4th series ===
Dynamo Berlin	5–10	Dynamo Weißwasser	Berlin

Dynamo Weißwasser	7–5	Dynamo Berlin	Weißwasser

Dynamo Berlin	3–5	Dynamo Weißwasser	Berlin

Dynamo Weißwasser won series 3–0

Dynamo Weißwasser overall won series 3–1

== Statistics ==
Player	Team	G	A	Pts
Ralf Hantschke	SG Dynamo Weißwasser	11	11	22
Hubert Hahn	SG Dynamo Weißwasser	10	5	15
Harald Kuhnke	SC Dynamo Berlin	7	6	13
Detlef Radant	SC Dynamo Berlin	6	6	12
Jan Schertz	SC Dynamo Berlin	6	4	10
Henry Domke	SG Dynamo Weißwasser	5	5	10
