= 1982–83 DDR-Oberliga (ice hockey) season =

East German ice hockey season

The 1982–83 DDR-Oberliga season was the 35th season of the DDR-Oberliga, the top level of ice hockey in East Germany. Two teams participated in the league, and SC Dynamo Berlin won the championship.

== Game results ==
Berlin	Dynamo Berlin	–	Dynamo Weißwasser	8:4
Weißwasser	Dynamo Weißwasser	–	Dynamo Berlin	5:8
Berlin	Dynamo Berlin	–	Dynamo Weißwasser	9:4
Weißwasser	Dynamo Weißwasser	–	Dynamo Berlin	5:9
Berlin	Dynamo Berlin	–	Dynamo Weißwasser	7:7
Weißwasser	Dynamo Weißwasser	–	Dynamo Berlin	2:9
Berlin	Dynamo Berlin	–	Dynamo Weißwasser	6:6
Weißwasser	Dynamo Weißwasser	–	Dynamo Berlin	1:6
Berlin	Dynamo Berlin	–	Dynamo Weißwasser	8:4
Weißwasser	Dynamo Weißwasser	–	Dynamo Berlin	5:3

Dynamo Berlin wins series 16:4 in points.
