= Torsten Kienass =

German ice hockey player

Personal information
- Nationality: German
- Born: 23 February 1971 (age 54); East Berlin, German Democratic Republic

Sport
- Sport: Ice hockey

Torsten Kienass (born 23 February 1971) is a German ice hockey player. He competed in the men's tournament at the 1994 Winter Olympics.

== Career statistics ==
=== Regular season and playoffs ===
			Regular season					Playoffs
Season	Team	League	GP	G	A	Pts	PIM	GP	G	A	Pts	PIM
1988–89	SC Dynamo Berlin	GDR	6	0	0	0	0	—	—	—	—	—
1989–90	SC Dynamo Berlin	GDR	12	1	0	1	8	—	—	—	—	—
1990–91	EHC Dynamo Berlin	1.GBun	27	1	1	2	19	7	1	0	1	4
1991–92	EHC Dynamo Berlin	GER.2	45	8	6	14	33	—	—	—	—	—
1992–93	EC Ratingen	1.GBun	44	3	12	15	16	3	0	0	0	2
1993–94	Düsseldorfer EG	1.GBun	44	0	17	17	42	12	3	2	5	8
1994–95	Düsseldorfer EG	DEL	42	4	9	13	12	10	1	2	3	4
1995–96	Düsseldorfer EG	DEL	43	3	11	14	14	13	1	2	3	2
1996–97	Nürnberg Ice Tigers	DEL	42	4	14	18	12	9	1	2	3	8
1997–98	ESC Moskitos Essen	GER.2	63	14	18	32	32	—	—	—	—	—
1998–99	ESC Moskitos Essen	GER.2	53	3	18	21	14	11	0	1	1	6
1999–2000	Moskitos Essen	DEL	49	2	4	6	8	—	—	—	—	—
2000–01	Düsseldorfer EG	DEL	51	3	7	10	26	—	—	—	—	—
2001–02	DEG Metro Stars	DEL	60	2	4	6	22	—	—	—	—	—
2002–03	DEG Metro Stars	DEL	40	1	1	2	12	5	0	1	1	2
2003–04	EV Duisburg	GER.2	45	8	12	20	30	4	0	1	1	6
2004–05	Füchse Duisburg	GER.2	39	6	13	19	14	12	1	3	4	8
2005–06	Füchse Duisburg	DEL	43	1	5	6	18	—	—	—	—	—
2007–08	Füchse Duisburg	DEL	32	0	3	3	12	—	—	—	—	—
1.GBun totals			115	4	30	34	77	22	4	2	6	14
GER.2 totals			245	39	67	106	123	27	1	5	6	20
DEL totals			402	20	56	76	136	37	3	7	10	16

=== International ===
Year	Team	Event	GP	G	A	Pts	PIM
1989	East Germany	WC B	5	0	0	0	6
1990	East Germany	WC B	6	0	0	0	0
1993	Germany	WC	6	0	0	0	2
1994	Germany	OG	7	0	0	0	2
1994	Germany	WC	5	0	1	1	2
1995	Germany	WC	5	1	0	1	4
1996	Germany	WC	6	1	0	1	2
1996	Germany	WCH	2	0	0	0	2
1997	Germany	WC	8	0	1	1	6
Senior totals			50	2	2	4	26

"Torsten Kienass". Elite Prospects.
