= 1980–81 DDR-Oberliga (ice hockey) season =

East German ice hockey season

The 1980–81 DDR-Oberliga season was the 33rd season of the DDR-Oberliga, the top level of ice hockey in East Germany. Two teams participated in the league, and SG Dynamo Weißwasser won the championship.

== Game results ==
Weißwasser	Dynamo Weißwasser	–	Dynamo Berlin	4:2
Weißwasser	Dynamo Weißwasser	–	Dynamo Berlin	3:3
Berlin	Dynamo Berlin	–	Dynamo Weißwasser	4:4
Weißwasser	Dynamo Weißwasser	–	Dynamo Berlin	4:4
Berlin	Dynamo Berlin	–	Dynamo Weißwasser	10:5
Weißwasser	Dynamo Weißwasser	–	Dynamo Berlin	6:4

Dynamo Weißwasser wins series 7:5 in points.
