= 1986–87 DDR-Oberliga (ice hockey) season =

East German ice hockey season

The 1986–87 DDR-Oberliga season was the 39th season of the DDR-Oberliga, the top level of ice hockey in East Germany. Two teams participated in the league, and SC Dynamo Berlin won the championship.

== Game results ==
=== 1st series ===
Berlin	Dynamo Berlin	–	Dynamo Weißwasser	6:2
Weißwasser	Dynamo Weißwasser	–	Dynamo Berlin	6:4
Berlin	Dynamo Berlin	–	Dynamo Weißwasser	7:5
Weißwasser	Dynamo Weißwasser	–	Dynamo Berlin	5:4
Berlin	Dynamo Berlin	–	Dynamo Weißwasser	2:3

Dynamo Weißwasser wins series 2 games to 1.

=== 2nd series ===
Weißwasser	Dynamo Weißwasser	–	Dynamo Berlin	3:4
Berlin	Dynamo Berlin	–	Dynamo Weißwasser	4:3
Weißwasser	Dynamo Weißwasser	–	Dynamo Berlin	8:5
Berlin	Dynamo Berlin	–	Dynamo Weißwasser	7:6

Dynamo Berlin wins series 3 games to 1.

=== 3rd series ===
Berlin	Dynamo Berlin	–	Dynamo Weißwasser	10:2
Weißwasser	Dynamo Weißwasser	–	Dynamo Berlin	3:9
Berlin	Dynamo Berlin	–	Dynamo Weißwasser	7:1

Dynamo Berlin wins series 3 games to 0, and wins the overall series 2-1.
