= 1971–72 DDR-Oberliga (ice hockey) season =

East German ice hockey season

The 1971–72 DDR-Oberliga season was the 24th season of the DDR-Oberliga, the top level of ice hockey in East Germany. Two teams participated in the league, and SG Dynamo Weißwasser won the championship.

== Game results ==
Weißwasser	Dynamo Weißwasser	–	Dynamo Berlin	4:5
Berlin	Dynamo Berlin	–	Dynamo Weißwasser	3:4
Weißwasser	Dynamo Weißwasser	–	Dynamo Berlin	4:2
Weißwasser	Dynamo Weißwasser	–	Dynamo Berlin	5:0
Berlin	Dynamo Berlin	–	Dynamo Weißwasser	6:4
Berlin	Dynamo Berlin	–	Dynamo Weißwasser	2:4
Weißwasser	Dynamo Weißwasser	–	Dynamo Berlin	5:1
Berlin	Dynamo Berlin	–	Dynamo Weißwasser	5:5

Dynamo Weißwasser wins series 11:5 in points.
