= 1981–82 DDR-Oberliga (ice hockey) season =

East German ice hockey season

The 1981–82 DDR-Oberliga season was the 34th season of the DDR-Oberliga, the top level of ice hockey in East Germany. Two teams participated in the league, and SC Dynamo Berlin won the championship.

== Game results ==
Weißwasser	SG Dynamo Weißwasser	–	SC Dynamo Berlin	1:6
Berlin	Dynamo Berlin	–	Dynamo Weißwasser	6:1
Weißwasser	Dynamo Weißwasser	–	Dynamo Berlin	1:2
Berlin	Dynamo Berlin	–	Dynamo Weißwasser	4:1
Berlin	Dynamo Berlin	–	Dynamo Weißwasser	4:1
Weißwasser	Dynamo Weißwasser	–	Dynamo Berlin	2:7
Weißwasser	Dynamo Weißwasser	–	Dynamo Berlin	3:4
Berlin	Dynamo Berlin	–	Dynamo Weißwasser	6:5
Weißwasser	Dynamo Weißwasser	–	Dynamo Berlin	4:5
Berlin	Dynamo Berlin	–	Dynamo Weißwasser	10:1

Dynamo Berlin wins series 20:0 in points
