= 1953–54 Oberliga (disambiguation) =

1953–54 Oberliga may refer to:

- 1953–54 Oberliga, a West German association football season
- 1953–54 DDR-Oberliga, an East German association football season
- 1953–54 Oberliga (ice hockey) season, a West German ice hockey season
- 1953–54 DDR-Oberliga (ice hockey) season, an East German ice hockey season
