= 1964–65 DDR-Oberliga (ice hockey) season =

East German ice hockey season

The 1964–65 DDR-Oberliga season was the 17th season of the DDR-Oberliga, the top level of ice hockey in East Germany. Eight teams participated in the league, and SG Dynamo Weißwasser won the championship.

== Regular season ==
Pl.	Team	GF–GA	Pts
1.	Dynamo Weißwasser	106:19	25:3
2.	Dynamo Berlin	106:33	24:4
3.	ASK Vorwärts Crimmitschau	62:38	22:6
4.	TSC Berlin	71:57	13:15
5.	Empor Rostock	58:77	12:16
6.	SC Karl-Marx-Stadt	74:59	10:18
7.	Einheit Dresden	23:136	4:24
8.	Turbine Erfurt	37:118	2:26
