= 1984–85 DDR-Oberliga (ice hockey) season =

East German ice hockey season

The 1984–85 DDR-Oberliga season was the 37th season of the DDR-Oberliga, the top level of ice hockey in East Germany. Two teams participated in the league, and SC Dynamo Berlin won the championship.

== Game results ==
Berlin	Dynamo Berlin	–	Dynamo Weißwasser	10:1
Weißwasser	Dynamo Weißwasser	–	Dynamo Berlin	0:0
Berlin	Dynamo Berlin	–	Dynamo Weißwasser	6:2
Weißwasser	Dynamo Weißwasser	–	Dynamo Berlin	3:8
Berlin	Dynamo Berlin	–	Dynamo Weißwasser	4:4
Weißwasser	Dynamo Weißwasser	–	Dynamo Berlin	5:1
Berlin	Dynamo Berlin	–	Dynamo Weißwasser	3:5
Weißwasser	Dynamo Weißwasser	–	Dynamo Berlin	1:4
Berlin	Dynamo Berlin	–	Dynamo Weißwasser	4:4
Weißwasser	Dynamo Weißwasser	–	Dynamo Berlin	9:3

Dynamo Berlin wins series 12:8 in points
