= 1979–80 DDR-Oberliga (ice hockey) season =

East German ice hockey season

The 1979–80 DDR-Oberliga season was the 32nd season of the DDR-Oberliga, the top level of ice hockey in East Germany. Two teams participated in the league, and SC Dynamo Berlin won the championship.

== Game results ==
Weißwasser	Dynamo Weißwasser	–	Dynamo Berlin	0:2
Berlin	Dynamo Berlin	–	Dynamo Weißwasser	10:5
Weißwasser	Dynamo Weißwasser	–	Dynamo Berlin	4:3
Weißwasser	Dynamo Weißwasser	–	Dynamo Berlin	5:3
Berlin	Dynamo Berlin	–	Dynamo Weißwasser	4:2
Berlin	Dynamo Berlin	–	Dynamo Weißwasser	10:3

Dynamo Berlin wins series 8:4 in points.
