= East German Women's Volleyball Cup =

Volleyball in East Germany

- Sport: Volleyball
- Founded: 1953
- Administrator: DSVB
- Country: East Germany
- Continent: Europe
- Most recent champion: SC Berlin (1st titles)
- Most titles: Dynamo Berlin (10 titles)
- Website: http://www.volleyball-verband.de

The East German Women's Volleyball Cup was played from the year 1953 to 1991, during the existence of East Germany State, This competition comes after the East German Volleyball League.

== Competition history ==
The East German Cup was not contested by independent sports clubs but only by "BSG" clubs — between 1969 and 1985 . However, between 1981 and 1985 Other sport clubs from non BSG Body was allowed to participate.

== Winners list ==
Years	Winners
1953	HSG Wiss. Halle
1954	BSG Fortschritt Zittau
1955	SC Wiss. Halle
1956	SC Wiss. Halle
1957	SC Rotation Leipzig
1958	SC Rotation Leipzig
1959	SC Chemie Halle
1960	SC Rotation Leipzig
1961	SC Rotation Berlin
1962	SC Chemie Halle
1963	TSC Berlin
1964	SC Dynamo Berlin
1965	SC Leipzig
1966	SC Dynamo Berlin
1967	SC Dynamo Berlin
1968	SC Dynamo Berlin
1969	SC Dynamo Meißen
1970	SC Dynamo Meißen
1971	SC Dynamo Meißen
1972	HSG Karl-Marx-Uni Leipzig
1973	HSG Wiss. DHfK Leipzig
1974	HSG Wiss. DHfK Leipzig

Years	Winners
1975	BSG WBK Berlin
1976	BSG WBK Berlin
1977	BSG WBK Berlin
1978	BSG WBK Berlin
1979	ISG Schwerin Süd
1980	ISG Schwerin Süd
1981	BSG Rotation Prenzlauer Berg; SC Traktor Schwerin
1982	BSG Fortschritt Berlin 2 SC Traktor Schwerin
1983	BSG WBK Berlin; SC Dynamo Berlin
1984	BSG Fernsehen Berlin; SC Dynamo Berlin
1985	BSG Fortschritt Schwerin; SC Dynamo Berlin
1986	SC Dynamo Berlin
1987	SC Dynamo Berlin
1988	SC Traktor Schwerin
1989	SC Dynamo Berlin
1990	SC Traktor Schwerin
1991	SC Berlin
