= 1972–73 DDR-Oberliga (ice hockey) season =

East German ice hockey season

The 1972–73 DDR-Oberliga season was the 25th season of the DDR-Oberliga, the top level of ice hockey in East Germany. Two teams participated in the league, and SG Dynamo Weißwasser won the championship.

== Game results ==
Berlin	Dynamo Berlin	–	Dynamo Weißwasser	3:4
Weißwasser	Dynamo Weißwasser	–	Dynamo Berlin	7:4
Berlin	Dynamo Berlin	–	Dynamo Weißwasser	2:3
Berlin	Dynamo Berlin	–	Dynamo Weißwasser	2:4
Weißwasser	Dynamo Weißwasser	–	Dynamo Berlin	3:4
Berlin	Dynamo Berlin	–	Dynamo Weißwasser	5:2
Halle	Dynamo Weißwasser	–	Dynamo Berlin	6:1
Halle	Dynamo Weißwasser	–	Dynamo Berlin	4:7

Dynamo Weißwasser wins series 10:6 in points.
