= 1985–86 DDR-Oberliga (ice hockey) season =

East German ice hockey season

The 1985–86 DDR-Oberliga season was the 38th season of the DDR-Oberliga, the top level of ice hockey in East Germany. Two teams participated in the league, and SC Dynamo Berlin won the championship.

== Game results ==
| Weißwasser | Dynamo Weißwasser | – | Dynamo Berlin | 4:3 |
| Berlin | Dynamo Berlin | – | Dynamo Weißwasser | 5:2 |
| Weißwasser | Dynamo Weißwasser | – | Dynamo Berlin | 4:8 |
| Berlin | Dynamo Berlin | – | Dynamo Weißwasser | 5:2 |
| Weißwasser | Dynamo Weißwasser | – | Dynamo Berlin | 2:6 |
| Berlin | Dynamo Berlin | – | Dynamo Weißwasser | 7:6 |
| Weißwasser | Dynamo Weißwasser | – | Dynamo Berlin | 6:3 |
| Berlin | Dynamo Berlin | – | Dynamo Weißwasser | 8:2 |
| Weißwasser | Dynamo Weißwasser | – | Dynamo Berlin | 3:5 |
| Berlin | Dynamo Berlin | – | Dynamo Weißwasser | 11:1 |

Dynamo Berlin wins series 16:4 in points.
