= 1974–75 DDR-Oberliga (ice hockey) season =

East German ice hockey season

The 1974–75 DDR-Oberliga season was the 27th season of the DDR-Oberliga, the top level of ice hockey in East Germany. Two teams participated in the league, and SG Dynamo Weißwasser won the championship.

== Game results ==
Berlin	Dynamo Berlin	–	Dynamo Weißwasser	3:1
Berlin	Dynamo Berlin	–	Dynamo Weißwasser	6:5
Weißwasser	Dynamo Weißwasser	–	Dynamo Berlin	4:3
Weißwasser	Dynamo Weißwasser	–	Dynamo Berlin	3:2
Berlin	Dynamo Berlin	–	Dynamo Weißwasser	3:4
Weißwasser	Dynamo Weißwasser	–	Dynamo Berlin	7:2

Dynamo Weißwasser won series 7:5 in points.
