= 1988–89 DDR-Oberliga (ice hockey) season =

1988–89 DDR-Oberliga season
- League: DDR-Oberliga
- Sport: Ice Hockey
- Games: 6
- Teams: 2

Regular season

Finals
- Champions: SG Dynamo Weißwasser

DDR-Oberliga seasons
- ← 1987–88 1989–90 →

The 1988–89 DDR-Oberliga season was the 41st and final season of the DDR-Oberliga, the top level of ice hockey in East Germany. Two teams participated in the league, and SG Dynamo Weißwasser won the championship.

Location of teams in the 1988–89 DDR-Oberliga

== Participating teams ==
Club	Location	Stadium	Capacity
SC Dynamo Berlin	Berlin	Wellblechpalast	4,695
SG Dynamo Weißwasser	Weißwasser	Eisstadion Weißwasser	2,750

== Game results ==
=== 1st series ===
Dynamo Berlin	1–3	Dynamo Weißwasser	Berlin

Dynamo Weißwasser	9–5	Dynamo Berlin	Weißwasser

Dynamo Berlin	1–4	Dynamo Weißwasser	Berlin

Dynamo Weißwasser won series 3–0

=== 2nd series ===
Dynamo Weißwasser	6–2	Dynamo Berlin	Weißwasser

Dynamo Berlin	5–6	Dynamo Weißwasser	Berlin

Dynamo Weißwasser	5–3	Dynamo Berlin	Weißwasser

Dynamo Weißwasser won series 3–0

Dynamo Weißwasser overall won series 2–0
