= 1978–79 DDR-Oberliga (ice hockey) season =

East German ice hockey season

The 1978–79 DDR-Oberliga season was the 31st season of the DDR-Oberliga, the top level of ice hockey in East Germany. Two teams participated in the league, and SC Dynamo Berlin won the championship.

== Game results ==
Berlin	Dynamo Berlin	–	Dynamo Weißwasser	6:1
Berlin	Dynamo Berlin	–	Dynamo Weißwasser	5:4
Weißwasser	Dynamo Weißwasser	–	Dynamo Berlin	3:2
Weißwasser	Dynamo Weißwasser	–	Dynamo Berlin	2:4
Berlin	Dynamo Berlin	–	Dynamo Weißwasser	4:0
Berlin	Dynamo Berlin	–	Dynamo Weißwasser	7:3
Weißwasser	Dynamo Weißwasser	–	Dynamo Berlin	4:4
Weißwasser	Dynamo Weißwasser	–	Dynamo Berlin	2:5
Berlin	Dynamo Berlin	–	Dynamo Weißwasser	4:2
Berlin	Dynamo Berlin	–	Dynamo Weißwasser	3:1
Weißwasser	Dynamo Weißwasser	–	Dynamo Berlin	0:3
Weißwasser	Dynamo Weißwasser	–	Dynamo Berlin	3:11

Dynamo Berlin wins series 21:3 in points.
