= 1956–57 Oberliga (disambiguation) =

1956–57 Oberliga may refer to:

- 1956–57 Oberliga, a West German association football season
- 1956 DDR-Oberliga, an East German association football season
- 1957 DDR-Oberliga, an East German association football season
- 1956–57 Oberliga (ice hockey) season, a West German ice hockey season
- 1956–57 DDR-Oberliga (ice hockey) season, an East German ice hockey season
