= 1949–50 Oberliga (disambiguation) =

1949–50 Oberliga may refer to:

- 1949–50 Oberliga, a West German association football season
- 1949–50 DDR-Oberliga, an East German association football season
- 1949–50 Oberliga (ice hockey) season, a West German ice hockey season
- 1950 DDR-Oberliga (ice hockey) season, an East German ice hockey season
