= 1975–76 DDR-Oberliga (ice hockey) season =

East German ice hockey season

The 1975–76 DDR-Oberliga season was the 28th season of the DDR-Oberliga, the top level of ice hockey in East Germany. Two teams participated in the league, and SC Dynamo Berlin won the championship.

== Game results ==
Location	Home Team	–	Visiting Team	Score
Weißwasser	Dynamo Weißwasser	–	Dynamo Berlin	4:4
Weißwasser	Dynamo Weißwasser	–	Dynamo Berlin	2:1
Berlin	Dynamo Berlin	–	Dynamo Weißwasser	3:3
Berlin	Dynamo Berlin	–	Dynamo Weißwasser	1:1
Weißwasser	Dynamo Weißwasser	–	Dynamo Berlin	1:4
Berlin	Dynamo Berlin	–	Dynamo Weißwasser	6:6
Berlin	Dynamo Berlin	–	Dynamo Weißwasser	3:5
Weißwasser	Dynamo Weißwasser	–	Dynamo Berlin	0:1
Weißwasser	Dynamo Weißwasser	–	Dynamo Berlin	1:4
Berlin	Dynamo Berlin	–	Dynamo Weißwasser	7:2

Dynamo Berlin wins series 12:8 in points.
