= 1957–58 Oberliga (disambiguation) =

1957–58 Oberliga may refer to:

- 1957–58 Oberliga, a West German association football season
- 1957 DDR-Oberliga, an East German association football season
- 1958 DDR-Oberliga, an East German association football season
- 1957–58 Oberliga (ice hockey) season, a West German ice hockey season
- 1957–58 DDR-Oberliga (ice hockey) season, an East German ice hockey season
