= 1973–74 DDR-Oberliga (ice hockey) season =

East German ice hockey season

The 1973–74 DDR-Oberliga season was the 26th season of the DDR-Oberliga, the top level of ice hockey in East Germany. Two teams participated in the league, and SG Dynamo Weißwasser won the championship.

== Game results ==
Weißwasser	Dynamo Weißwasser	–	Dynamo Berlin	4:2
Weißwasser	Dynamo Weißwasser	–	Dynamo Berlin	3:2
Berlin	Dynamo Berlin	–	Dynamo Weißwasser	3:6
Berlin	Dynamo Berlin	–	Dynamo Weißwasser	4:3
Weißwasser	Dynamo Weißwasser	–	Dynamo Berlin	6:4
Weißwasser	Dynamo Weißwasser	–	Dynamo Berlin	6:2
Berlin	Dynamo Berlin	–	Dynamo Weißwasser	2:1

Dynamo Weißwasser wins series 12:4 in points.

== Bibliography ==
- Müller, Stephan (2000). Deutsche Eishockey Meisterschaften. Print on Demand. ISBN 3-8311-0997-4.
