= 1970–71 DDR-Oberliga (ice hockey) season =

East German ice hockey season

The 1970–71 DDR-Oberliga season was the 23rd season of the DDR-Oberliga, the top level of ice hockey in East Germany. Two teams participated in the league, and SG Dynamo Weißwasser won the championship.

== Game results ==
Berlin	Dynamo Berlin	–	Dynamo Weißwasser	3:2
Weißwasser	Dynamo Weißwasser	–	Dynamo Berlin	4:4
Berlin	Dynamo Berlin	–	Dynamo Weißwasser	3:4
Weißwasser	Dynamo Weißwasser	–	Dynamo Berlin	4:1
Berlin	Dynamo Berlin	–	SG Dynamo Weißwasser	3:7
Berlin	Dynamo Berlin	–	Dynamo Weißwasser	8:4
Weißwasser	Dynamo Weißwasser	–	Dynamo Berlin	6:5
Weißwasser	Dynamo Weißwasser	–	Dynamo Berlin	5:7

Dynamo Weißwasser wins series 9:7 in points
