= 1977–78 DDR-Oberliga (ice hockey) season =

East German ice hockey season

The 1977–78 DDR-Oberliga season was the 30th season of the DDR-Oberliga, the top level of ice hockey in East Germany. Two teams participated in the league, and SC Dynamo Berlin won the championship.

== Game results ==
Weißwasser	SG Dynamo Weißwasser	–	Dynamo Berlin	5:6
Weißwasser	Dynamo Weißwasser	–	Dynamo Berlin	4:6
Berlin	Dynamo Berlin	–	Dynamo Weißwasser	7:3
Berlin	Dynamo Berlin	–	Dynamo Weißwasser	6:2
Weißwasser	Dynamo Weißwasser	–	Dynamo Berlin	0:0
Berlin	Dynamo Berlin	–	Dynamo Weißwasser	5:4
Berlin	Dynamo Berlin	–	Dynamo Weißwasser	4:2
Weißwasser	Dynamo Weißwasser	–	Dynamo Berlin	3:3
Weißwasser	Dynamo Weißwasser	–	Dynamo Berlin	4:4
Berlin	Dynamo Berlin	–	Dynamo Weißwasser	6:3

Dynamo Berlin wins series 17:3 in points
