= 1955–56 Oberliga (disambiguation) =

1955–56 Oberliga may refer to:

- 1955–56 Oberliga, a West German association football season
- 1955 DDR-Oberliga, an East German association football season
- 1956 DDR-Oberliga, an East German association football season
- 1955–56 Oberliga (ice hockey) season, a West German ice hockey season
- 1955–56 DDR-Oberliga (ice hockey) season, an East German ice hockey season
