= 1959–60 DDR-Oberliga (ice hockey) season =

East German ice hockey season

The 1959–60 DDR-Oberliga season was the 12th season of the DDR-Oberliga, the top level of ice hockey in East Germany. Eight teams participated in the league, and SG Dynamo Weißwasser won the championship.

== First round ==
=== Group 1 ===
Pl.	Team	GP	SW	T	L	GF–GA	Pts
1.	SG Dynamo Weißwasser	12	12	0	0	115:23	24:0
2.	SC Wismut Karl-Marx-Stadt	12	7	1	4	58:57	15:9
3.	SG Dynamo Rostock	12	4	1	7	43:66	9:15
4.	SC Einheit Berlin	12	0	0	12	36:106	0:24

=== Group 2 ===
Pl.	Team	GP	W	T	L	GF–GA	Pts
1.	ASK Vorwärts Berlin	12	8	1	3	69:24	17:7
2.	SC Dynamo Berlin	12	8	0	4	90:27	16:8
3.	TSC Oberschöneweide	12	6	1	5	55:38	13:11
4.	ASK Vorwärts Erfurt	12	1	0	11	13:138	2:22

== Final round ==
Pl.	Team	GP	W	T	L	GF–GA	Pts
1.	SG Dynamo Weißwasser	6	5	1	0	40:9	11:1
2.	SC Dynamo Berlin	6	3	1	2	23:21	7:5
3.	ASK Vorwärts Berlin	6	2	0	4	15:33	4:8
4.	SC Wismut Karl-Marx-Stadt	6	1	0	5	16:31	2:10

== Qualification round ==
Pl.	Team	GP	W	T	L	GF–GA	Pts
1.	SG Dynamo Rostock	6	5	0	1	27:13	10:2
2.	TSC Oberschöneweide	6	4	1	1	38:18	9:3
3.	SC Einheit Berlin	6	1	1	4	22:37	3:9
4.	ASK Vorwärts Erfurt	6	1	0	5	15:34	2:10
