= Dynamo Berlin =

Dynamo Berlin may refer to:

- SC Dynamo Berlin, a multi-sports club in East Berlin from 1954 to 1991
- Berliner FC Dynamo, an association football club separated out of SC Dynamo Berlin in 1966 and still extant
