= 1961–62 Oberliga (disambiguation) =

1961–62 Oberliga may refer to:

- 1961–62 Oberliga, a West German association football season
- 1961–62 DDR-Oberliga, an East German association football season
- 1961–62 DDR-Oberliga (ice hockey) season, an East German ice hockey season
