= 1953–54 DDR-Oberliga (ice hockey) season =

East German ice hockey season

The 1953–54 DDR-Oberliga season was the sixth season of the DDR-Oberliga, the top level of ice hockey in East Germany. Six teams participated in the league, and SG Dynamo Weißwasser won the championship.

== Regular season ==
Pl.	Team	GP	W	T	L	GF–GA	Pts
1.	SG Dynamo Weißwasser	10	9	0	1	110:22	18:2
2.	BSG Wismut Frankenhausen	10	8	1	1	92:34	17:3
3.	BSG Einheit Berliner Bär	10	6	1	3	55:45	13:7
4.	BSG Turbine Crimmitschau	10	3	0	7	40:83	6:14
5.	BSG Motor Treptow	10	1	1	8	24:74	3:17
6.	Wissenschaft HU Berlin	10	1	1	8	17:80	3:17
