= 1968–69 DDR-Oberliga (ice hockey) season =

East German ice hockey season

The 1968–69 DDR-Oberliga season was the 21st season of the DDR-Oberliga, the top level of ice hockey in East Germany. Eight teams participated in the league, and SG Dynamo Weißwasser won the championship.

== First round ==
Pl.	Team	GF–GA	Pts
1.	SG Dynamo Weißwasser	87:22	23:5
2.	SC Dynamo Berlin	87:42	21:7
3.	SC Empor Rostock	62:46	20:8
4.	ASK Vorwärts Crimmitschau	56:47	16:12
5.	Berliner TSC	62:60	13:15
6.	SC Einheit Dresden	36:64	10:18
7.	SC Turbine Erfurt	58:88	8:20
8.	SC Karl-Marx-Stadt	31:110	1:27

== Final round ==
Pl.	Team	GF–GA	Pts
1.	SG Dynamo Weißwasser	139:60	39:13
2.	SC Dynamo Berlin	145:78	36:16
3.	ASK Vorwärts Crimmitschau	101:100	29:23
4.	SC Empor Rostock	95:107	24:28

== Qualification round ==
Pl.	Team	GF–GA	Pts
1.	TSC Berlin	101:81	27:19
2.	Turbine Erfurt	97:118	22:24
3.	Einheit Dresden	60:98	16:30
4.	SC Karl-Marx-Stadt	57:113	3:43
