= 1961–62 DDR-Oberliga (ice hockey) season =

East German ice hockey season

The 1961–62 DDR-Oberliga season was the 14th season of the DDR-Oberliga, the top level of ice hockey in East Germany. Eight teams participated in the league, and SG Dynamo Weißwasser won the championship.

== First round ==
Pl.	Team	GF–GA	Pts
1.	SG Dynamo Weißwasser	129:25	28:0
2.	SC Wismut Karl-Marx-Stadt	96:32	22:6
3.	SC Dynamo Berlin	99:40	19:9
4.	SC Einheit Berlin	67:66	16:12
5.	SC Dynamo Rostock	56:53	13:15
6.	ASK Vorwärts Crimmitschau	58:54	10:18
7.	SC Turbine Erfurt	30:149	4:24
8.	SC Empor Rostock	30:146	0:28

== Final round ==
Pl.	Team	GF–GA	Pts
1.	SG Dynamo Weißwasser	55:23	21:3
2.	SC Dynamo Berlin	62:32	17:7
3.	SC Wismut Karl-Marx-Stadt	30:51	7:17
4.	SC Einheit Berlin	31:72	3:21

== Qualification round ==
Pl.	Team	GF–GA	Pts
1.	ASK Vorwärts Crimmitschau	76:21	22:2
2.	Dynamo Rostock	97:29	18:6
3.	Empor Rostock	33:89	6:18
4.	Turbine Erfurt	23:90	2:22
