= 1974–75 Oberliga (disambiguation) =

1974–75 Oberliga may refer to:

- 1974–75 Oberliga, a West German association football season
- 1974–75 DDR-Oberliga, an East German association football season
- 1974–75 DDR-Oberliga (ice hockey) season, an East German ice hockey season
