= 1965–66 DDR-Oberliga (ice hockey) season =

East German ice hockey season

The 1965–66 DDR-Oberliga season was the 18th season of the DDR-Oberliga, the top level of ice hockey in East Germany. Eight teams participated in the league, and SC Dynamo Berlin won the championship.

== First round ==
| Pl. | Team | GF–GA | Pts |
|---|---|---|---|
| 1. | TSC Berlin | 108:22 | 32:0 |
| 2. | Empor Rostock | 102:53 | 23:9 |
| 3. | Turbine Erfurt | 81:74 | 15:17 |
| 4. | Einheit Dresden | 42:119 | 6:16 |
| 5. | SC Karl-Marx-Stadt | 60:123 | 4:28 |

== Final round ==
| Pl. | Team | GF–GA | Pts |
|---|---|---|---|
| 1. | Dynamo Berlin | 53:25 | 18:6 |
| 2. | Dynamo Weißwasser | 47:24 | 17:7 |
| 3. | ASK Vorwärts Crimmitschau | 42:50 | 10:14 |
| 4. | TSC Berlin | 20:63 | 3:21 |

== Qualification round ==
| Pl. | Team | GF–GA | Pts |
|---|---|---|---|
| 1. | Empor Rostock | 94:35 | 18:6 |
| 2. | Turbine Erfurt | 83:46 | 16:8 |
| 3. | SC Karl-Marx-Stadt | 65:38 | 14:10 |
| 4. | Einheit Dresden | 80:151 | 0:24 |
