= 1969–70 DDR-Oberliga (ice hockey) season =

East German ice hockey season

The 1969–70 DDR-Oberliga season was the 22nd season of the DDR-Oberliga, the top level of ice hockey in East Germany. Seven teams participated in the league, and SG Dynamo Weißwasser won the championship.

== First round ==
Pl.	Team	GF–GA	Pts
1.	TSC Berlin	37:23	12:4
2.	Empor Rostock	30:26	11:5
3.	ASK Vorwärts Crimmitschau	31:20	9:7
4.	Turbine Erfurt	30:34	6:10
5.	Einheit Dresden	14:30	2:14

== Final round ==
Pl.	Team	GF–GA	Pts
1.	SG Dynamo Weißwasser	47:22	18:6
2.	TSC Berlin	51:35	15:9
3.	SC Dynamo Berlin	47:47	11:13
4.	Empor Rostock	26:67	4:20

== Qualification round ==
Pl.	Team	GF–GA	Pts
1.	ASK Vorwärts Crimmitschau	31:27	10:6
2.	Einheit Dresden	23:17	6:6
3.	Turbine Erfurt	19:29	4:8
