= 1960–61 DDR-Oberliga (ice hockey) season =

East German ice hockey season

The 1960–61 DDR-Oberliga season was the 13th season of the DDR-Oberliga, the top level of ice hockey in East Germany. Eight teams participated in the league, and SG Dynamo Weißwasser won the championship.

== First round ==
=== Group 1 ===
Pl.	Team	GF–GA	Pts
1.	SG Dynamo Weißwasser	66:8	12:0
2.	ASK Vorwärts Crimmitschau	21:11	7:5
3.	SC Einheit Berlin	23:26	5:7
4.	SC Empor Rostock	13:78	0:12

=== Group 2 ===
Pl.	Team	GF–GA	Pts
1.	SC Dynamo Berlin	57:21	10:2
2.	SC Wismut Karl-Marx-Stadt	40:15	10:2
3.	SC Dynamo Rostock	28:38	4:8
4.	SC Motor Karl-Marx-Stadt	11:62	0:12

== Final round ==
Pl.	Team	GF–GA	Pts
1.	SG Dynamo Weißwasser	66:19	23:1
2.	SC Dynamo Berlin	55:43	13:11
3.	SC Wismut Karl-Marx-Stadt	51:62	8:16
4.	ASK Vorwärts Crimmitschau	27:75	4:20

== Qualification round ==
Pl.	Team	GF–GA	Pts
1.	SC Einheit Berlin	71:34	10:2
2.	SC Dynamo Rostock	79:31	16:8
3.	SC Empor Rostock	42:71	5:19
4.	SC Motor Karl-Marx-Stadt	33:89	5:19
