= 1967–68 DDR-Oberliga (ice hockey) season =

East German ice hockey season

The 1967–68 DDR-Oberliga season was the 20th season of the DDR-Oberliga, the top level of ice hockey in East Germany. Eight teams participated in the league, and SC Dynamo Berlin won the championship.

== Regular season ==
Pl.	Team	GF–GA	Pts
1.	Dynamo Berlin	112:30	26:2
2.	Dynamo Weißwasser	88:25	23:5
3.	ASK Vorwärts Crimmitschau	75:36	20:8
4.	Empor Rostock	68:57	18:10
5.	Berliner TSC	39:71	8:20
6.	Turbine Erfurt	49:89	7:21
7.	Einheit Dresden	38:90	7:21
8.	SC Karl-Marx-Stadt	33:104	3:25
