= 1956–57 DDR-Oberliga (ice hockey) season =

East German ice hockey season

The 1956–57 DDR-Oberliga season was the ninth season of the DDR-Oberliga, the top level of ice hockey in East Germany. Six teams participated in the league, and SG Dynamo Weißwasser won the championship.

== Regular season ==
Pl.	Team	GP	W	T	L	GF–GA	Pts
1.	SG Dynamo Weißwasser	10	10	0	0	92:23	20:0
2.	SC Einheit Berlin	10	7	1	2	73:45	15:5
3.	SC Wismut Karl-Marx-Stadt	10	6	1	3	53:33	13:7
4.	SC Dynamo Berlin	10	3	0	7	33:63	6:14
5.	SC Motor Berlin	10	2	0	8	27:72	4:16
6.	SG Dynamo Rostock	10	1	0	9	32:74	2:18
