= Joachim Franke =

German ice hockey player (1940–2024)

- Born: 30 March 1940; Weißwasser, Germany
- Died: 19 March 2024 (aged 83); Bernau, Germany
- Position: Forward
- Played for: SG Dynamo Weißwasser
- National team: East Germany
- Playing career: 1954–1968

Medal record

Men's ice hockey

Representing East Germany

European Championships
Bronze medal – third place	1966 Ljubljana	Team

Joachim Franke (30 March 1940 – 19 March 2024) was a German ice hockey player, who competed for SG Dynamo Weißwasser. He won the bronze medal with the East Germany national team at the 1966 European Championships.

Franke played a total of 40 games for East Germany at the World Championships between 1959 and 1967, recording eight goals and two assists.

Franke died on 19 March 2024, at the age of 83.
