= 1957–58 DDR-Oberliga (ice hockey) season =

East German ice hockey season

The 1957–58 DDR-Oberliga season was the tenth season of the DDR-Oberliga, the top level of ice hockey in East Germany. Six teams participated in the league, and SG Dynamo Weißwasser won the championship.

== Regular season ==
Pl.	Team	GP	W	T	L	GF–GA	Pts
1.	SG Dynamo Weißwasser	10	9	0	1	71:12	18:2
2.	SC Wismut Karl-Marx-Stadt	10	7	1	2	47:25	15:5
3.	SC Einheit Berlin	10	5	1	4	54:49	11:9
4.	SC Dynamo Berlin	10	3	3	4	30:40	9:11
5.	TSC Oberschöneweide	10	2	0	8	24:77	4:16
6.	SG Dynamo Rostock	10	1	1	8	27:50	3:17
