= 1960–61 Oberliga (disambiguation) =

1960–61 Oberliga may refer to:

- 1960–61 Oberliga, a West German association football season
- 1960 DDR-Oberliga, an East German association football season
- 1960–61 DDR-Oberliga (ice hockey) season, an East German ice hockey season
