= 1958–59 Oberliga (disambiguation) =

1958–59 Oberliga may refer to:

- 1958–59 Oberliga, a West German association football season
- 1958 DDR-Oberliga, an East German association football season
- 1959 DDR-Oberliga, an East German association football season
- 1958–59 DDR-Oberliga (ice hockey) season, an East German ice hockey season
