= 1958–59 DDR-Oberliga (ice hockey) season =

East German ice hockey season

The 1958–59 DDR-Oberliga season was the 11th season of the DDR-Oberliga, the top level of ice hockey in East Germany. Seven teams participated in the league, and SG Dynamo Weißwasser won the championship.

== Regular season ==
Pl.	Team	GP	W	T	L	GF–GA	Pts
1.	SG Dynamo Weißwasser	12	11	0	1	107:13	22:2
2.	SC Dynamo Berlin	12	10	1	1	77:28	21:3
3.	SC Wismut Karl-Marx-Stadt	12	8	1	3	77:32	17:7
4.	ASK Vorwärts Berlin	12	6	0	6	38:58	12:12
5.	TSC Oberschöneweide	12	2	1	9	27:74	5:19
6.	SG Dynamo Rostock	12	2	0	10	30:71	4:20
7.	SC Einheit Berlin	12	1	1	10	23:103	3:21
