= 1966–67 DDR-Oberliga (ice hockey) season =

East German ice hockey season

The 1966–67 DDR-Oberliga season was the 19th season of the DDR-Oberliga, the top level of ice hockey in East Germany. Eight teams participated in the league. SG Dynamo Weißwasser and SC Dynamo Berlin won the championship.

== First round ==
Pl.	Team	GF–GA	Pts
1.	Empor Rostock	82:43	27:5
2.	TSC Berlin	75:50	22:10
3.	SC Karl-Marx-Stadt	84:77	15:17
4.	Turbine Erfurt	71:71	14:18
5.	Einheit Dresden	40:121	2:30

== Final round ==
Pl.	Team	GF–GA	Pts
1.	SC Dynamo Berlin	65:31	23:7
2.	SG Dynamo Weißwasser	70:33	22:8
3.	ASK Vorwärts Crimmitschau	55:58	11:19
4.	Empor Rostock	32:99	4:26

== Qualification round ==
Pl.	Team	GF–GA	Pts
1.	TSC Berlin	120:75	36:14
2.	SC Karl-Marx-Stadt	121:113	26:24
3.	Turbine Erfurt	123:105	25:25
4.	Einheit Dresden	68:199	2:48
