= Hemmo =

Hemmo is a masculine given name and a surname. Notable people with the name are as follows:

== Given name ==
- Hemmo Kallio (1863–1940), Finnish actor
- Hemmo Riihimäki (born 2003), Finnish footballer
- Hemmo Silvennoinen (1932–2002), Finnish ski jumper

== Surname ==
- Albert Hemmo (born 1934), Israeli basketball player
- Roland Hemmo (born 1946), German actor
