= 1983–84 DDR-Oberliga (ice hockey) season =

East German ice hockey season

The 1983–84 DDR-Oberliga season was the 36th season of the DDR-Oberliga, the top level of ice hockey in East Germany. Two teams participated in the league, and SC Dynamo Berlin won the championship.

== Game results ==
Weißwasser	Dynamo Weißwasser	–	Dynamo Berlin	6:2
Berlin	Dynamo Berlin	–	Dynamo Weißwasser	7:6
Weißwasser	Dynamo Weißwasser	–	Dynamo Berlin	3:7
Berlin	Dynamo Berlin	–	Dynamo Weißwasser	7:0
Weißwasser	Dynamo Weißwasser	–	Dynamo Berlin	5:7
Berlin	Dynamo Berlin	–	Dynamo Weißwasser	6:3
Weißwasser	Dynamo Weißwasser	–	Dynamo Berlin	2:3
Berlin	Dynamo Berlin	–	Dynamo Weißwasser	10:2

Dynamo Berlin wins series 14:2 in points.
