= 1962–63 Oberliga (disambiguation) =

1962–63 Oberliga may refer to:

- 1962–63 Oberliga, a West German association football season
- 1962–63 2. Oberliga, a West German tier two association football league
- 1962–63 DDR-Oberliga, an East German association football season
- 1962–63 DDR-Oberliga (ice hockey) season, an East German ice hockey season
