= 1976–77 DDR-Oberliga (ice hockey) season =

East German ice hockey season

The 1976–77 DDR-Oberliga season was the 29th season of the DDR-Oberliga, the top level of ice hockey in East Germany. Two teams participated in the league, and SC Dynamo Berlin won the championship.

== Game results ==
Berlin	Dynamo Berlin	–	Dynamo Weißwasser	8:3
Berlin	Dynamo Berlin	–	Dynamo Weißwasser	0:8
Berlin	Dynamo Berlin	–	Dynamo Weißwasser	6:3
Berlin	Dynamo Berlin	–	Dynamo Weißwasser	5:2
Berlin	Dynamo Berlin	–	Dynamo Weißwasser	5:5
Berlin	Dynamo Berlin	–	Dynamo Weißwasser	3:5
Berlin	Dynamo Berlin	–	Dynamo Weißwasser	4:3
Berlin	Dynamo Berlin	–	Dynamo Weißwasser	4:11
Berlin	Dynamo Berlin	–	Dynamo Weißwasser	5:3
Berlin	Dynamo Berlin	–	Dynamo Weißwasser	4:4

Dynamo Berlin wins series 12:8 in points.
