= 1959–60 Oberliga (disambiguation) =

1959–60 Oberliga is a West German association football season.

1959–60 Oberliga may also refer to:

- 1959 DDR-Oberliga, an East German association football season
- 1960 DDR-Oberliga, an East German association football season
- 1959–60 DDR-Oberliga (ice hockey) season, an East German ice hockey season
