= 1963–64 DDR-Oberliga (ice hockey) season =

East German ice hockey season

The 1963–64 DDR-Oberliga season was the 16th season of the DDR-Oberliga, the top level of ice hockey in East Germany. Six teams participated in the league, and SG Dynamo Weißwasser won the championship.

== Regular season ==
Pl.	Team	GF–GA	Pts
1.	Dynamo Weißwasser	58:18	17:3
2.	Dynamo Berlin	52:33	16:4
3.	ASK Vorwärts Crimmitschau	40:32	12:8
4.	SC Karl-Marx-Stadt	24:42	6:14
5.	TSC Berlin	26:49	5:15
6.	Empor Rostock	34:66	4:16
