= DDR-Bestenermittlung =

- Sport: Ice hockey
- Founded: 1971
- Folded: 1990
- No. of teams: 8 (from 1974)
- Country: East Germany
- Most titles: BSG Monsator Berlin (11)

The DDR-Bestenermittlung was the unofficial and amateur second level ice hockey league in East Germany from 1971–1990.

== History ==
It was formed by two teams that were removed from the DDR-Oberliga for the 1970-71 season, when it was reduced from five to two teams, and two teams from the former second level league, the Gruppenliga. BSG Einheit Crimmitschau, and BSG Motor Optima Erfurt from the Oberliga were joined by BSG Chernie Leuna and SG Dynamo Schierke from the Gruppenliga.

Promotion and relegation between Group A and Group B started in 1974 and continued until the championship ceased in 1990.

The Bestenermittlung operated as the unofficial second level of ice hockey in East Germany until the Reunification of Germany in 1990.

== Champions ==
- 1971: BSG Einheit Crimmitschau
- 1972: BSG Einheit Crimmitschau
- 1973: BSG Motor Optima Erfurt
- 1974: BSG Einheit Crimmitschau
- 1975: BSG Einheit Crimmitschau (Group A), BSG Motor Bad Muskau (Group B)
- 1976: BSG Monsator Berlin (Group A), BSG Chemie 70 Rostock (Group B)
- 1977: BSG Monsator Berlin (Group A), BSG Einheit Crimmitschau (Group B)
- 1978: BSG Monsator Berlin (Group A), BSG Motor Optima Erfurt (Group B)
- 1979: BSG Monsator Berlin (Group A), SG Dynamo Klingenthal (Group B)
- 1980: BSG Einheit Crimmitschau (Group A), BSG Chemie 70 Rostock (Group B)
- 1981: BSG Monsator Berlin (Group A), BSG Aufbau Halle (Group B)
- 1982: BSG Monsator Berlin (Group A), BSG HO Lebensmittel Erfurt (Group B)
- 1983: BSG Monsator Berlin (Group A), BSG HO Lebensmittel Erfurt (Group B)
- 1984: BSG Monsator Berlin (Group A), BSG Chemie 70 Rostock (Group B)
- 1985: BSG Monsator Berlin (Group A), BSG HO Lebensmittel Erfurt (Group B)
- 1986: BSG Monsator Berlin (Group A), BSG Spartakus Berlin (Group B)
- 1987: BSG Monsator Berlin (Group A), BSG Einheit Weißwasser (Group B)
- 1988: BSG Einheit Weißwasser (Group A), BSG Spartakus Berlin (Group B)
- 1989: SG Dynamo Fritz Lesch Berlin (Group A), BSG Motor Bad Muskau (Group B)
- 1990: SG Dynamo Fritz Lesch Berlin (Group A), Berliner SV AdW (Group B)
