= 1962–63 DDR-Oberliga (ice hockey) season =

East German ice hockey season

The 1962–63 DDR-Oberliga season was the 15th season of the DDR-Oberliga, the top level of ice hockey in East Germany. Six teams participated in the league, and SG Dynamo Weißwasser won the championship.

== Regular season ==
Pl.	Team	GF–GA	Pts
1.	Dynamo Weißwasser	62:20	18:2
2.	Dynamo Berlin	49:25	16:4
3.	ASK Vorwärts Crimmitschau	30:28	10:10
4.	SC Wismut Karl-Marx-Stadt	26:38	6:14
5.	SC Empor Rostock	33:54	6:14
6.	Einheit Berlin	22:57	4:16
