= Eisstadion Weißwasser =

Arena in Weißwasser, Germany

Coordinates: 51°29′45″N 14°38′09″E

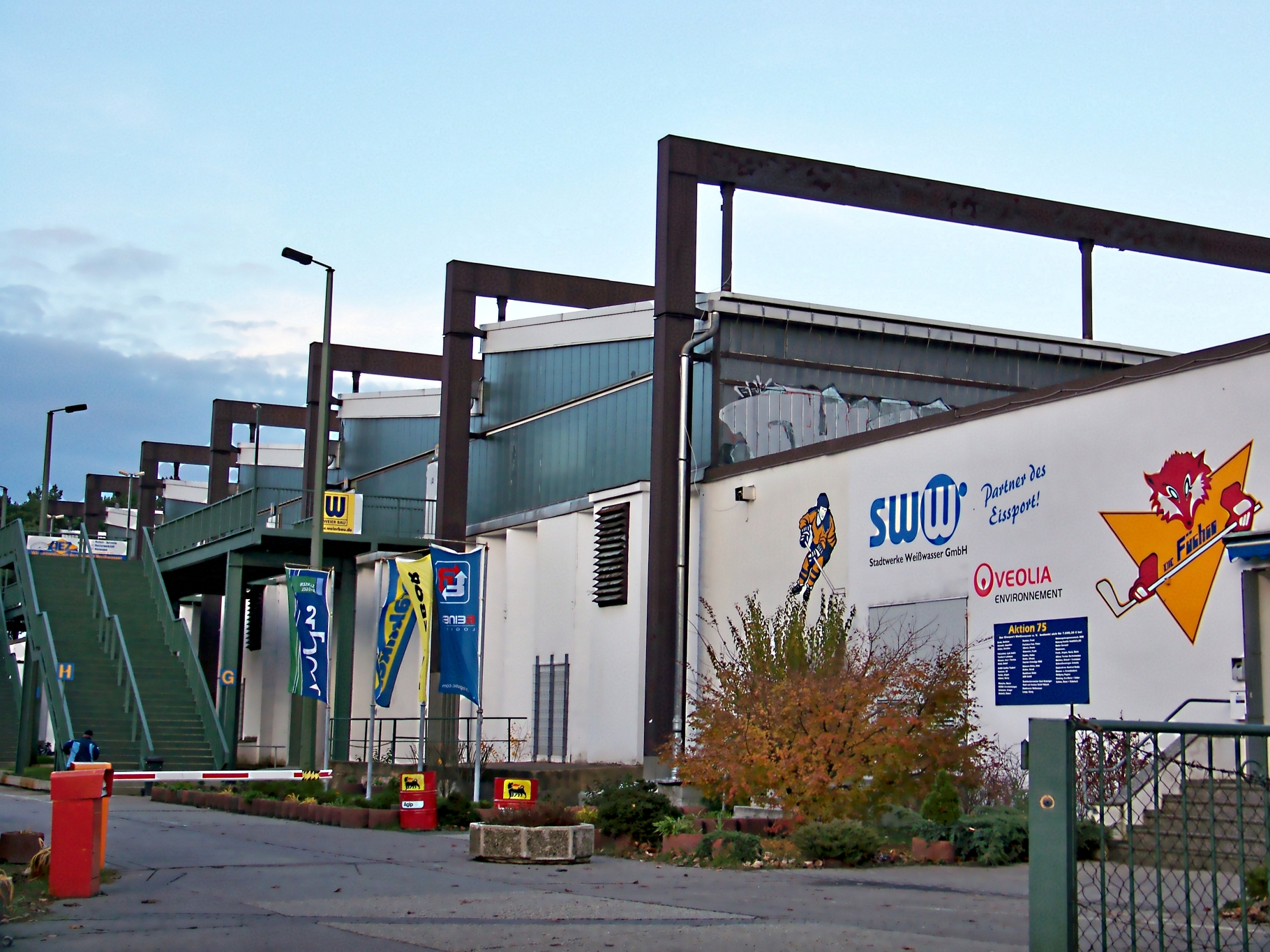
- Interactive map of Eisstadion Weißwasser
- Location: Weißwasser, Germany
- Capacity: 2,750

Construction
- Opened: 1973

Tenant
- Lausitzer Füchse

Eisstadion Weißwasser, is an arena in Weißwasser, Germany. It is primarily used for ice hockey, and is the home to the Lausitzer Füchse of the 2nd Bundesliga. It opened in 1973 and holds 2,750 spectators.

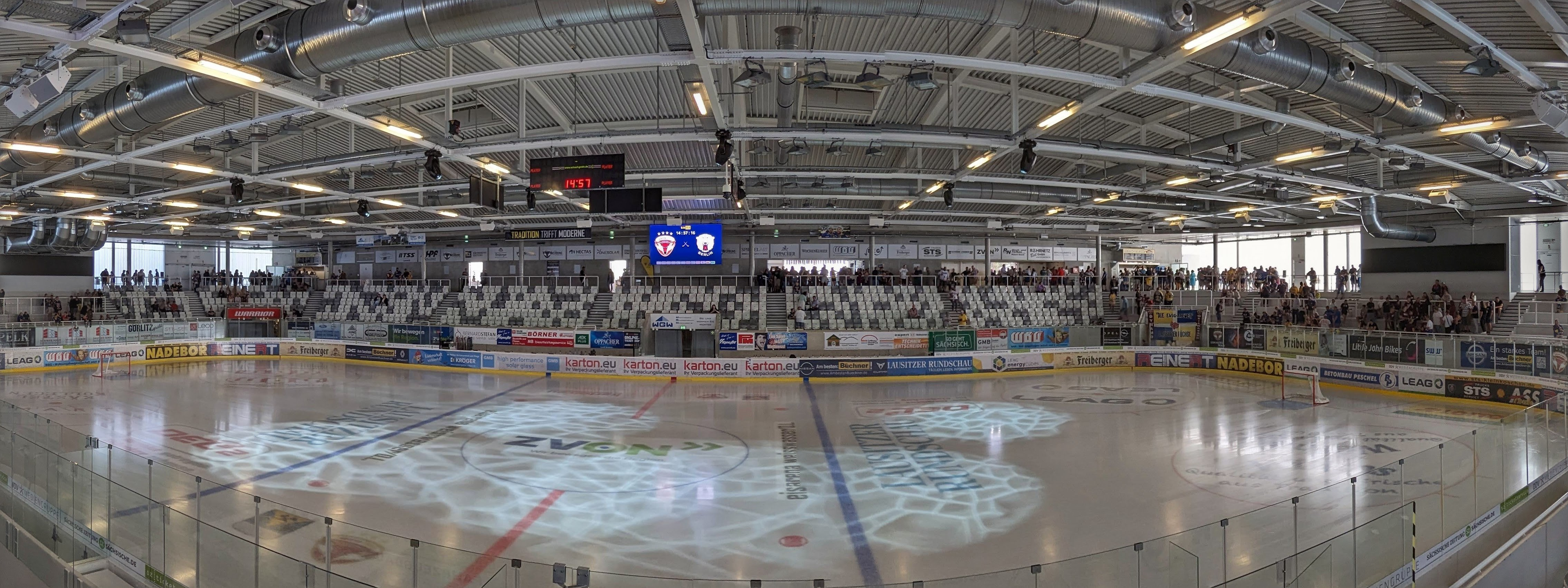
Interior in August 2023
