= 1950 DDR-Oberliga (ice hockey) season =

East German ice hockey season

The 1950 East German Championship season was the second season of ice hockey in East Germany. It was contested in 1950 as part of the first Winter Sports Championship. Six teams participated in the tournament, and SG Frankenhausen won the championship.

== First round ==
SG Frankenhausen - KWU Erfurt	5:4
Kristall Weißwasser - Textil Crimmitschau	7:3
Empor Berlin - SG Schierke	17:1

== Final round ==
Pl.	Team	GP	W	T	L	Goals	Pts
1.	SG Frankenhausen	2	2	0	0	11:5	4
2.	BSG Empor Berlin	2	1	0	1	6:8	2
3.	BSG Kristall Weißwasser	2	0	0	2	8:12	0

== 4th-6th place ==
Pl.	Team	GP	W	T	L	Goals	Puts
4.	BSG Textil Crimmitschau	2	2	0	0	20:5	4
5.	BSG KWU Erfurt	1^{1}	0	0	1	4:9	0
6.	SG Schierke	1^{1}	0	0	1	1:11	0

^{1}Game between SG Schierke and BSG KWU Erfurt was not contested.
