= East German Volleyball Bundesliga =

Volleyball competition

East Germany Championship
- Sport: Volleyball
- Founded: 1951
- First season: 1951
- Folded: 1991
- Administrator: DSVB
- Country: East Germany
- Continent: Europe
- Level on pyramid: 1st Level
- Domestic cup: East Germany Cup
- International cups: CEV Champions League; CEV Cup; CEV Challenge Cup

The GDR Volleyball Championship was an annual competition for men's and women's volleyball teams from the GDR. It was held between 1951 and 1991.

The championship was organized by the German Sports Volleyball Association of the GDR (Deutscher Sportverband Volleyball der DDR - DSVB ). Shortly after the unification of Germany in 1991, the volleyball federations of the GDR and FRG were also merged into a single German Volleyball Union. In the 1991/92 season, the first German unified championship was held.

== Winners List Women ==
Years	Champions	Runners-up	Third Place
1951	Geschwister Scholl Halle		
1952	HSG Wissenschaft Halle		
1953	HSG Wissenschaft Halle	BSG Fortschritt Zittau	HSG Wissenschaft Jena
1954	HSG Wissenschaft Halle		
1955	HSG Wissenschaft Halle		
1956	SC Rotation Berlin		
1957	SC Wissenschaft Halle		
1958	SC Rotation Berlin	SC Rotation Leipzig	SC Chemie Halle
1959	SC Rotation Leipzig		
1960	SC Rotation Leipzig	SC Rotation Berlin	SC Dynamo Berlin
1961	SC Rotation Leipzig	SC Dynamo Berlin	SC Chemie Halle
1962	SC Dynamo Berlin	SC Rotation Leipzig	SC Traktor Schwerin
1963	SC Dynamo Berlin	SC Leipzig	SC Traktor Schwerin
1964	SC Dynamo Berlin	SC Leipzig	SC DHfK Leipzig
1965	SC Dynamo Berlin	SC Leipzig	SC DHfK Leipzig
1966	SC Dynamo Berlin	SC Leipzig	SC DHfK Leipzig
1967	SC Leipzig	SC Dynamo Berlin	SC DHfK Leipzig
1968	SC Dynamo Berlin	SC Leipzig	SC DHfK Leipzig
1969	SC Dynamo Berlin	SC Leipzig	SC DHfK Leipzig
1970	SC Leipzig	SC Dynamo Berlin	SC Dynamo Berlin-II
1971	SC Leipzig	SC Dynamo Berlin	SC Dynamo Berlin-II
1972	SC Dynamo Berlin	SC Traktor Schwerin	SC Leipzig
1973	SC Dynamo Berlin	SC Traktor Schwerin	TSC Berlin
1974	SC Dynamo Berlin	SC Traktor Schwerin	TSC Berlin
1975	SC Dynamo Berlin	SC Traktor Schwerin	TSC Berlin
1976	SC Traktor Schwerin	SC Dynamo Berlin	SC Leipzig
1977	SC Traktor Schwerin	SC Dynamo Berlin	SC Leipzig
1978	SC Dynamo Berlin	SC Traktor Schwerin	SC Leipzig
1979	SC Dynamo Berlin	SC Traktor Schwerin	TSC Berlin
1980	SC Traktor Schwerin	SC Dynamo Berlin	TSC Berlin
1981	SC Traktor Schwerin	SC Dynamo Berlin	TSC Berlin
1982	SC Traktor Schwerin	SC Dynamo Berlin	SC Leipzig
1983	SC Traktor Schwerin	SC Dynamo Berlin	TSC Berlin
1984	SC Traktor Schwerin	SC Dynamo Berlin	SC Leipzig
1985	SC Dynamo Berlin	SC Traktor Schwerin	TSC Berlin
1986	SC Dynamo Berlin	SC Traktor Schwerin	TSC Berlin
1987	SC Dynamo Berlin	SC Traktor Schwerin	TSC Berlin
1988	SC Dynamo Berlin	SC Traktor Schwerin	TSC Berlin
1989	SC Dynamo Berlin-II	TSC Berlin	SC Traktor Schwerin
1990	SC Dynamo Berlin	TSC Berlin	SC Traktor Schwerin
1991	SC Berlin	Schweriner SC	SC Leipzig
