= 1951–52 DDR-Oberliga (ice hockey) season =

East German ice hockey season

The 1951–52 DDR-Oberliga season was the fourth season of the DDR-Oberliga, the top level of ice hockey in East Germany. Seven teams participated in the league, and Chemie Weißwasser won the championship.

== Regular season ==
Pl.	Team	GF–GA	Pts
1.	Chemie Weißwasser	112:18	22:2
2.	Wismut Erz Frankenhausen	95:30	22:2
3.	Fortschritt Crimmitschau	58:51	13:11
4.	Einheit Dresden Süd	32:47	12:12
5.	Einheit Berliner Bär	53:67	11:13
6.	SV Deutsche Volkspolizei Berlin	31:141	4:20
7.	Fortschritt Apolda	9:31	0:24

== Final ==
- Chemie Weißwasser - Wismut Erz Frankenhausen 6:5 OT
