= 1951 DDR-Oberliga (ice hockey) season =

East German ice hockey season

The 1951 DDR-Oberliga season was the third season of the DDR-Oberliga, the top level of ice hockey in East Germany. Four teams participated in the league, and BSG Ostglas Weißwasser won the championship.

== Regular season ==
Pl.	Team	GP	W	T	L	Goals	Puts
1.	BSG Ostglas Weißwasser	6	6	0	0	33:15	12:0
2.	SG Frankenhausen	6	3	1	2	40:22	7:5
3.	BSG Textil Pleißengrund Crimmitschau	6	2	0	4	28:43	4:8
4.	BSG Empor Berlin	6	0	1	5	19:38	1:11
