= 1949 Ostzonenmeisterschaft (ice hockey) =

Former first season of ice hockey in East Germany

The 1949 Ostzonenmeisterschaft season was the first season of ice hockey in what became East Germany. Four teams participated in the league, and SG Frankenhausen won the championship. It was played on 11–13 February 1949 in Oberhof.

== Semifinals ==
- SG Frankenhausen 5–2 SG Apolda
- Grün-Weiß Pankow 6–0 SG Schierke

== 3rd place ==
- SG Apolda 5–2 SG Schierke

== Final ==
- SG Frankenhausen 8–2 Grün-Weiß Pankow
