= 1987–88 DDR-Oberliga (ice hockey) season =

East German ice hockey season

The 1987–88 DDR-Oberliga season was the 40th season of the DDR-Oberliga, the top level of ice hockey in East Germany. Two teams participated in the league, and SC Dynamo Berlin won the championship.

== Game results ==
=== 1st series ===
Weißwasser	Dynamo Weißwasser	–	Dynamo Berlin	3:1
Berlin	Dynamo Berlin	–	Dynamo Weißwasser	7:6
Weißwasser	Dynamo Weißwasser	–	Dynamo Berlin	3:5
Berlin	Dynamo Berlin	–	Dynamo Weißwasser	6:3

Dynamo Berlin wins series 3 games to 1.

=== 2nd series ===
Berlin	Dynamo Berlin	–	Dynamo Weißwasser	1:5
Weißwasser	Dynamo Weißwasser	–	Dynamo Berlin	4:6
Berlin	Dynamo Berlin	–	Dynamo Weißwasser	5:3
Weißwasser	Dynamo Weißwasser	–	Dynamo Berlin	5:6

Dynamo Berlin wins series 3 games to 1, and the overall series 2-0.
