= 1955–56 DDR-Oberliga (ice hockey) season =

East German ice hockey season

The 1955–56 DDR-Oberliga season was the eighth season of the DDR-Oberliga, the top level of ice hockey in East Germany. Four teams participated in the league, and SG Dynamo Weißwasser won the championship.

== Regular season ==
Pl.	Team	GF–GA	Pts
1.	SG Dynamo Weißwasser	38:11	6:2
2.	SC Einheit Berlin	16:31	4:4
3.	SC Wismut Karl-Marx-Stadt	11:23	2:6
4.	HSG Wissenschaft HU Berlin	Did not play	
