= 1954–55 DDR-Oberliga (ice hockey) season =

East German ice hockey season

The 1954–55 DDR-Oberliga season was the seventh season of the DDR-Oberliga, the top level of ice hockey in East Germany. Seven teams participated in the league, and SG Dynamo Weißwasser won the championship.

== Regular season ==
Pl.	Team	GF–GA	Pts
1.	SG Dynamo Weißwasser	180:10	24:0
2.	SC Wismut Karl-Marx-Stadt	102:38	18:6
3.	SC Einheit Berlin	57:63	13:11
4.	HSG Wissenschaft HU Berlin	37:87	10:14
5.	BSG Turbine Crimmitschau	36:71	9:15
6.	SC Motor Berlin	49:81	8:16
7.	BSG Wismut Zwickau	25:136	2:22
