= 1948–49 Oberliga (ice hockey) season =

First season for the Oberliga Hockey League in Germany

The 1948-49 Oberliga season was the first season of the Oberliga, the top level of ice hockey in Germany. Six teams participated in the league, and EV Füssen won the championship.

== Regular season ==
| | Club | Gp | W | T | L | GF–GA | Pts |
|---|---|---|---|---|---|---|---|
| 1. | EV Füssen | 10 | 8 | 1 | 1 | 51:24 | 17:3 |
| 2. | Preußen Krefeld | 10 | 8 | 0 | 2 | 37:21 | 16:4 |
| 3. | SC Riessersee | 8 | 5 | 0 | 3 | 33:26 | 10:6 |
| 4. | VfL Bad Nauheim | 9 | 3 | 0 | 6 | 25:41 | 6:12 |
| 5. | HC Augsburg | 10 | 2 | 1 | 7 | 18:35 | 5:15 |
| 6. | Kölner EK | 7 | 0 | 0 | 7 | 11:37 | 0:14 |
