= 1952–53 DDR-Oberliga (ice hockey) season =

East German ice hockey season

The 1952–53 DDR-Oberliga season was the fifth season of the DDR-Oberliga, the top level of ice hockey in East Germany. Five teams participated in the league, and Chemie Weißwasser won the championship.

== Regular season ==
Pl.	Team	GF–GA	Pts
1.	BSG Chemie Weißwasser	77:15	16:0
2.	BSG Wismut Erz Frankenhausen	55:22	12:4
3.	BSG Turbine Crimmitschau	26:43	6:10
4.	BSG Einheit Berliner Bär	26:52	6:10
5.	BSG Einheit Dresden Süd	3:55	0:16
