= Roland Hemmo =

German actor

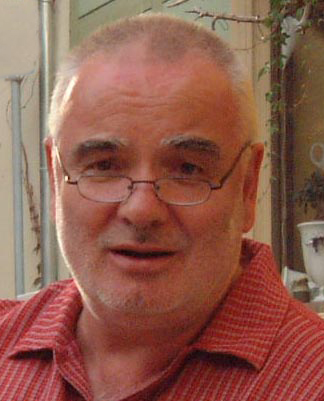
- Born: 25 February 1946 (age 80); Weißwasser, Soviet Occupation Zone
- Occupation: Actor
- Years active: 1978–present

Roland Hemmo (born 25 February 1946 in Weißwasser, then part of the Soviet Occupation Zone of Germany) is a German actor who specializes in television and dubbing. Roland Hemmo is one of the most successful voice actors in the history of German cinema. He has worked for over 1000 Hollywood productions since 1978.

Roland Hemmo lives in Berlin and is married with two children.

== Career ==
After he finished college, he enrolled at the Ernst Busch Academy of Dramatic Arts. He acted in over 1500 performances on some of the most important stages in Germany: Deutsches Theater Berlin, Staatsoper Berlin, Komischer Oper. His voice acting career began with the leading role in the Russian production from Stanislaw Lem's “Test pilota Pirxa”.

== Movies ==
A small selection out of over 1000 movies as a voice actor:

- The Departed
- The Good Shepherd
- The Omen
- The Black Dahlia
- Eragon
- X-Men
- V for Vendetta
- Dreamgirls
- Match Point
- Harry Potter
- Kingdom of Heaven
- Dark Water
- Elizabethtown
- The Producers
- Brokeback Mountain
- Sin City
- King Kong
- Madagascar - Maurice

=== Older movies ===
- Starship Troopers
- Ocean's Eleven // Twelve // Thirteen
- Crimson Tide
- Instinct
- CopyKill
- Mission: Impossible
- Amistadt
- Perdita Durango
- Rules of Engagement
- Con Air
- Troy
- The Lord of the Rings
- Master and Commander
- The Last Samurai
- The Bourne Identity
- The Ring
- Blair Witch 2
- Gangs of New York
- Catch Me If You Can
- The Matrix Revolutions
- The Matrix Reloaded
- Starsky and Hutch
- The Wedding Planner
- Enigma
- 13th Floor
- Se7en
- The Bodyguard
- Any Given Sunday
- Jimmy Hoffa
- Pleasantville
- 12 Monkeys
- Collateral Damage
- Romeo + Juliet
- City of Angels
- Jurassic Park - Lost World
- Sleepers
- Ransom
- Eine Frage der Ehre
- L.A. Confidential
- Lilo & Stitch
- Star Wars II and III
- Fargo
- Forrest Gump
- Mars Attacks!

== TV shows ==
- Winnie the Pooh – Narrator
- Gilmore Girls
- Grey's Anatomy
- Star Trek: Deep Space Nine
- Lilo & Stitch
- Six Feet Under
- Millennium
- Numb3rs
- Stargate Atlantis
- Roseanne
- Starhunter
- Gargoyles
- Welcome, Mrs. President
- Malcolm in the middle
- X-Files
- Impy's Wonderland
- Jakers! The Adventures of Piggley Winks – Wiley
- Dragon Ball Super - Erzähler

== Actors ==
A selection out of over 400 actors which are dubbed by Roland Hemmo:

- Samuel L. Jackson
- Christopher Lee
- Tom Hanks
- Delroy Lindo
- Brendan Gleeson
- Alfred Molina
- Martin Sheen
- Steve McQueen
- Jean Reno
- Donald Sutherland
- Warren Clarke
- John Noble
- Colm Meaney
- Morten Grunwald
- Daniel Von Bargen
- Mel Brooks
- Martin Scorsese
- Oliver Stone
- Forest Whitaker
