= 1956–57 Oberliga (ice hockey) season =

German ice hockey season

The 1956-57 Oberliga season was the ninth season of the Oberliga, the top level of ice hockey in Germany. 11 teams participated in the league, and EV Füssen won the championship.

== First round ==
=== West Group ===
	Club	GP	W	T	L	GF–GA	Pts
1.	VfL Bad Nauheim	10	10	0	0	67:34	20: 0
2.	Mannheimer ERC (N)	10	8	0	2	57:21	16: 4
3.	Düsseldorfer EG	10	6	0	4	57:39	12: 8
4.	Krefelder EV	10	3	0	7	40:48	6:14
5.	Kölner EK (N)	10	2	0	8	30:72	4:16
6.	Preußen Krefeld	10	1	0	9	30:61	2:18

=== South Group ===
	Club	Sp	W	T	L	GF–GA	Pts
1.	SC Riessersee	8	7	0	1	76:32	14:2
2.	EV Füssen (M)	8	6	0	2	67:28	12:4
3.	EC Bad Tölz	8	5	0	3	62:42	10:6
4.	SC Weßling	8	2	0	6	27:70	4:12
5.	EV Kaufbeuren (N)	8	0	0	8	32:92	0:16

== Final round ==
	Club	GP	W	T	L	GF–GA	Pts
1.	EV Füssen (M)	8	7	1	0	61:18	15:1
2.	SC Riessersee	8	5	0	3	31:31	10:6
3.	EC Bad Tölz	8	4	1	3	38:27	9:7
4.	Mannheimer ERC (N)	8	1	1	6	26:45	3:13
5.	VfL Bad Nauheim	8	1	1	6	20:55	3:13

== Relegation ==
Preußen Krefeld – Berliner Schlittschuhclub 6:2
