= 1949–50 Oberliga (ice hockey) season =

German ice hockey season

The 1949-50 Oberliga season was the second season of the Oberliga, the top level of ice hockey in Germany. Eight teams participated in the league, and SC Riessersee won the championship.

== Regular season ==
	Club	Gp	W	T	L	GF–GA	Pts
1.	SC Riessersee	14	12	1	1	93:29	25:3
2.	Preußen Krefeld	14	11	1	2	145:36	23:5
3.	EV Füssen	14	10	2	2	129:27	22:6
4.	VfL Bad Nauheim	14	8	2	4	75:39	18:10
5.	Kölner EK	14	4	2	8	41: 105	10:18
6.	Krefelder EV	14	4	1	9	49:72	9:19
7.	EV Tegernsee	14	1	2	11	28:112	4:24
8.	HC Augsburg	14	0	1	13	21:161	1:27
