= 1953–54 Oberliga (ice hockey) season =

German ice hockey season

The 1953-54 Oberliga season was the sixth season of the Oberliga, the top level of ice hockey in Germany. Eight teams participated in the league, and EV Füssen won the championship.

== Regular season ==
	Club	GP	W	T	L	GF–GA	Pts
1.	EV Füssen	14	13	0	1	127:53	26:2
2.	Krefelder EV	14	10	1	3	111:38	21:7
3.	EC Bad Tölz	14	10	0	4	87:41	20:8
4.	Preußen Krefeld	14	7	1	6	85:49	15:13
5.	SC Riessersee	14	7	0	7	84:66	14:14
6.	VfL Bad Nauheim	14	5	2	7	64:72	12:16
7.	SC Weßling	14	1	0	13	37:135	2:26
8.	Düsseldorfer EG	14	1	0	13	19:131	2:26

== Relegation ==
SC Weßling - EV Rosenheim 3:3
