= 1952–53 Oberliga (ice hockey) season =

German ice hockey season

The 1952-53 Oberliga season was the fifth season of the Oberliga, the top level of ice hockey in Germany. Eight teams participated in the league, and EV Füssen won the championship.

== Regular season ==
	Club	GP	W	T	L	GF–GA	Pts
1.	EV Füssen	14	12	2	0	134:33	26:2
2.	SC Riessersee	14	11	2	1	96:45	24:4
3.	Krefelder EV (M)	14	10	0	4	85:42	20:8
4.	EC Bad Tölz	14	5	1	8	54:63	11:17
5.	VfL Bad Nauheim	14	5	0	9	50:54	10:18
6.	Preußen Krefeld	14	5	0	9	55:102	10:18
7.	Düsseldorfer EG	14	3	1	10	26:96	7:21
8.	EV Rosenheim	14	2	0	12	34:99	4:24

== Relegation ==
Düsseldorfer EG – LTTC Rot-Weiß Berlin 14:3
