= 1955–56 Oberliga (ice hockey) season =

German ice hockey season

The 1955-56 Oberliga season was the eighth season of the Oberliga, the top level of ice hockey in Germany. Eight teams participated in the league, and EV Füssen won the championship.

== Regular season ==
	Club	GP	W	T	L	GF–GA	Pts
1.	EV Füssen	14	12	0	2	144:33	24:4
2.	SC Riessersee	14	12	0	2	100:36	24:4
3.	EC Bad Tölz	14	9	0	5	78:44	18:10
4.	VfL Bad Nauheim	14	7	0	7	44:64	14:14
5.	Krefelder EV	14	5	0	9	55:63	10:18
6.	Preußen Krefeld	14	4	1	9	43:113	9:19
7.	Düsseldorfer EG	14	3	1	10	46:94	7:21
8.	SC Weßling	14	3	0	11	39:102	6:22

== Final ==
EV Füssen – SC Riessersee 4:2 (1:1, 3:1, 0:0)
