= 1957–58 Oberliga (ice hockey) season =

German ice hockey season

The 1957-58 Oberliga season was the 10th season of the Oberliga, the top level of ice hockey in Germany. The Oberliga was replaced by the Ice hockey Bundesliga as the top-level league for 1958–59. The Oberliga became the second level of German ice hockey. 12 teams participated in the league, and EV Füssen won the championship. Preußen Krefeld won the DEV-Pokal.

== First round ==
=== West Group ===
	Club	GP	W	T	L	GF–GA	Pts
1.	Mannheimer ERC	10	9	0	1	79:24	18:2
2.	Krefelder EV	10	8	0	2	50:25	16:4
3.	Düsseldorfer EG	10	5	1	4	47:36	11:9
4.	Preußen Krefeld	10	5	0	5	43:59	10:10
5.	VfL Bad Nauheim	10	1	2	7	34:50	4:16
6.	Kölner EK	10	0	1	9	23:82	1:19

=== South Group ===
	Club	GP	W	T	L	GF–GA	Pts
1.	SC Riessersee	10	10	0	0	98:19	20:0
2.	EV Füssen (M)	10	8	0	2	87:23	16:4
3.	EC Bad Tölz	10	6	0	4	70:39	12:8
4.	SC Weßling	10	3	1	6	23:76	7:13
5.	EV Landshut (N)	10	1	1	8	21:94	3:17
6.	EV Kaufbeuren	10	0	2	8	23:71	2:18

== Final round ==
	Club	GP	W	T	L	GF–GA	Pts
1.	EV Füssen (M)	10	8	1	1	64:24	17:3
2.	SC Riessersee	10	6	1	3	40:39	13:7
3.	EC Bad Tölz	10	6	0	4	53:42	12:8
4.	Mannheimer ERC	10	4	1	5	31:37	9:11
5.	Krefelder EV	10	2	2	6	36:53	6:15
6.	Düsseldorfer EG	10	1	1	8	33:62	3:17

== DEV-Pokal ==
	Club	GP	W	T	L	GF–GA	Pts
1.	Preußen Krefeld	10	7	0	3	55:38	14:6
2.	VfL Bad Nauheim	10	6	1	3	53:28	13:7
3.	EV Kaufbeuren	10	6	0	4	32:44	12:8
4.	EV Landshut (N)	10	5	2	3	38:29	12:8
5.	SC Weßling	10	4	1	5	34:43	9:11
6.	Kölner EK	10	0	0	10	30:80	0:20
