= 1950–51 Oberliga (ice hockey) season =

German ice hockey season

The 1950–51 Oberliga season was the third season of the Oberliga, the top level of ice hockey in Germany. 12 teams participated in the league, and Preußen Krefeld won the championship.

== First round ==
=== North ===
	Club	Gp	W	T	L	GF–GA	Pts
1.	Düsseldorfer EG (N)	6	6	0	0	84:4	12:0
2.	HTHC Hamburg (N)	4	2	0	2	9:14	4:4
3.	WSV Braunlage (N)	2	0	0	2	0:41	0:4
4.	Berliner SC (N)	4	0	0	4	8:42	0:8

=== West ===
	Club	Gp	W	T	L	GF–GA	Pts
1.	Preußen Krefeld	6	6	0	0	50:7	12:0
2.	VfL Bad Nauheim	6	4	0	2	42:23	8:4
3.	Krefelder EV	6	2	0	4	30:38	4:8
4.	Kölner EK	6	0	0	6	6:60	0:12

=== South ===
	Club	Gp	W	T	L	GF–GA	Pts
1.	EV Füssen	6	5	1	0	61:14	11:1
2.	SC Riessersee (M)	6	4	1	1	55:16	9:3
3.	EC Bad Tölz (N)	6	1	0	5	28:53	2:10
4.	EV Tegernsee	6	1	0	5	12:73	2:10

== Qualification for final round ==
- EC Bad Tölz – Krefelder EV 2:3
- Krefelder EV – Düsseldorfer EG 5:2

== Final round ==
	Club	Gp	W	T	L	GF–GA	Pts
1.	Preußen Krefeld	8	8	0	0	60:22	16:0
2.	EV Füssen	8	6	0	2	50:26	12:4
3.	SC Riessersee (M)	8	2	2	4	36:48	6:10
4.	VfL Bad Nauheim	8	2	2	4	23:38	6:10
5.	Krefelder EV	8	0	0	8	24:59	0:16

== Relegation ==
- EV Rosenheim - EV Tegernsee 2:0
