= 1954–55 Oberliga (ice hockey) season =

German ice hockey season

The 1954-55 Oberliga season was the seventh season of the Oberliga, the top level of ice hockey in Germany. Eight teams participated in the league, and EV Füssen won the championship.

== Regular season ==
	Club	GP	W	T	L	GF–GA	Pts
1.	EV Füssen	14	11	3	0	111:32	25:3
2.	Krefelder EV	14	10	2	2	116:33	22:6
3	SC Riessersee	14	10	0	4	78:33	20:8
4.	EC Bad Tölz	14	7	3	4	58:439	17:11
5.	VfL Bad Nauheim	14	6	1	7	56:68	13:15
6.	Preußen Krefeld	14	2	4	8	49:81	8:20
7.	SC Weßling	14	2	2	10	33:96	6:22
8.	Mannheimer ERC	14	0	1	13	18:133	1:27
