= 1951–52 Oberliga (ice hockey) season =

German ice hockey season

The 1951-52 Oberliga season was the fourth season of the Oberliga, the top level of ice hockey in Germany. Eight teams participated in the league, and Krefelder EV won the championship.

== First round ==
=== North ===
| | Club | GP | W | T | L | GF–GA | Pts |
|---|---|---|---|---|---|---|---|
| 1. | VfL Bad Nauheim | 3 | 2 | 1 | 0 | 15:7 | 5:1 |
| 2. | Krefelder EV | 4 | 2 | 1 | 1 | 8:9 | 5:3 |
| 3. | Preußen Krefeld (M) | 1 | 1 | 0 | 0 | 4:3 | 2:0 |
| 4. | Düsseldorfer EG | 4 | 0 | 0 | 4 | 2:20 | 0:8 |

=== South ===
| | Club | GP | W | T | L | GF–GA | Pts |
|---|---|---|---|---|---|---|---|
| 1. | SC Riessersee | 4 | 4 | 0 | 0 | 36:10 | 8:0 |
| 2. | EV Füssen | 4 | 2 | 0 | 2 | 33:19 | 4:4 |
| 3. | EC Bad Tölz | 2 | 0 | 0 | 2 | 6:18 | 0:4 |
| 4. | EV Rosenheim (N) | 2 | 0 | 0 | 2 | 8:26 | 0:4 |

==== 3rd place ====
- EC Bad Tölz – EV Rosenheim 6:3

== Final round ==
| | Club | GP | W | T | L | GF–GA | Pts |
|---|---|---|---|---|---|---|---|
| 1. | Krefelder EV | 10 | 7 | 1 | 2 | 49:32 | 15:5 |
| 2. | SC Riessersee | 10 | 7 | 1 | 2 | 64: 47 | 15:5 |
| 3. | VfL Bad Nauheim | 10 | 3 | 2 | 5 | 35: 39 | 8:12 |
| 4. | EV Füssen | 10 | 4 | 0 | 6 | 52: 54 | 8:12 |
| 5. | Preußen Krefeld (M) | 10 | 3 | 1 | 6 | 38:44 | 7:13 |
| 6. | EC Bad Tölz | 10 | 3 | 1 | 6 | 27: 49 | 7:13 |

=== Final ===
- Krefelder EV – SC Riessersee 6:4 (2:2, 1:1, 3:1)

== Relegation ==
=== South ===
- EV Rosenheim – TEV Miesbach 8:2
