= SC Dynamo Berlin =

East German sports club

- Full name: Sports Club Dynamo Berlin
- Founded: 1 October 1954; 71 years ago
- Folded: 1991; 35 years ago
- Based in: East Berlin
- Location: East Germany
- Stadium: Dynamo-Sportforum
- Colors: Claret
- Affiliation: SV Dynamo

The Sports Club Dynamo Berlin was an East German sports club that existed from 1954 to 1991. It was the largest sports club of SV Dynamo, the sports association of the security agencies. The club was reformed after German reunification and succeeded by sports club SC Berlin.

== Founding ==
On 13 July 1954, the SED Politburo adopted the directive "For the further rapid upward development of physical culture and sport" (Direktive des Politbüros der SED zur weiteren raschen Aufwärtsentwicklung von Körperkultur und Sport). The directive aimed to promote elite sports in East Germany and determined the establishment of sports clubs (Sportclub, SC) and focus points as well as sports schools for children.

In immediate response to the Politburo directive, the SV Dynamo central management decided on 18 September 1954, that a central sports club should be established in Berlin. The ambitious objective for the new sports club, adopted during the II. Delegate Conference of SV Dynamo (II. Delegiertenkonferenz), was for the sports club to have developed into the largest sports center within SV Dynamo by the end of 1955.

The new central sports club of SV Dynamo, SC Dynamo Berlin, was effectively founded on 1 October 1954. Among the sports to be practiced within SC Dynamo Berlin were football, boxing, cycling, volleyball, women's handball, rowing, swimming and judo. For the formation of the new sports club, the central management of SV Dynamo decided that:

- The existing focus points (Schwerpunkt) of SV Dynamo, such as boxing, rowing, judo, swimming, figure skating in Berlin, equestrian sports in Bernau and athletics in Potsdam, would be separated from their current sports communities (Sportgemeinschaft, SG) and transferred to SC Dynamo Berlin
- Promising individuals from the football and ice hockey departments would be appointed to the new sports club.

The existing focus points in ice hockey (SG Dynamo Weißwasser), athletics (SG Dynamo Potsdam) and equestrian sports (SG Dynamo Bernau) were thus separated from their previous sports communities and integrated organizationally into SC Dynamo Berlin.

Until 1988, SC Dynamo Berlin was by far the largest club with the most departments in the entire East Germany.

== Sporting spectrum ==
The sports club offered the following sports in the 1980s: team handball, athletics, gymnastics, cycling, speed skating, racewalking, figure skating, ice hockey, fencing, boxing, and volleyball.

- The departments in equestrianism, modern pentathlon and parachuting were separated from the sports club in 1956 and merged into the new sports club SC Dynamo Hoppegarten in Hoppegarten.
- The football department was separated from the sports club in 1966 and reorganized as football club BFC Dynamo. BFC Dynamo eventually became the record champion of the DDR-Oberliga.
- The judo department was transferred to SC Dynamo Hoppegarten in 1966.

SC Dynamo Berlin was one of the world's most successful sports clubs during the East German era. In artistic gymnastics alone, SC Dynamo Berlin produced 12 European champions, 11 World champions and four Olympic champions, since 1955.

== Dynamo-Sportforum ==
The Dynamo-Sportforum was a large multi-use sports complex in East Berlin that contained an athletic stadium, a gymnasium, a roller-skating hall, an ice rink and a velodrome. The Sportforum is still in operation and is now used by SC Berlin and BFC Dynamo, as well as junior teams of Eisbären Berlin, among several other tenants. SC Berlin, BFC Dynamo and Eisbären Berlin all share a common history in SC Dynamo Berlin.

== Controversies surrounding the sports club ==
=== The case of doping ===
Two former SC Dynamo Berlin club doctors, Dieter Binus, chief of the East German national women's swimmer team from 1976 to 1980, and Bernd Pansold, in charge of the sports medicine center in East Berlin, were committed for trial for allegedly supplying 19 teenagers with illegal substances. Binus was sentenced in August 1998 and Pansold in December 1998, after both being found guilty of administering hormones to underage female athletes from 1975 to 1984.

=== The Stasi and Erich Mielke ===
Already as early as the 1950s, the club had a reputation for being a "Stasi club". The president of SV Dynamo Erich Mielke was also the head of the Stasi from 1957 to 1989. The Stasi was widely regarded as one of the most effective intelligence agencies in the world. The organization had 91,000 staff members and 174,000 unofficial collaborators by 1989.

== End of East Germany ==
SV Dynamo was dissolved after the Peaceful Revolution. SC Dynamo Berlin was then renamed 1. Polizei-Sportclub Berlin on 21 March 1990. Harold Dimke became the president of PSC Berlin. PSC Berlin included departments in boxing, figure skating, speed skating, fencing, handball, judo, athletics, cycling, rowing, swimming, gymnastics, volleyball and judo. The department in judo was taken over from SC Dynamo Hoppeparten as a branch of PSC Berlin in Hoppegarten. The former ice hockey departement of SC Dynamo Berlin became independent as ice hockey club EHC Dynamo Berlin. Both PSC Berlin and EHC Dynamo Berlin were sponsored by the Ministry of the Interior of East Germany.

PSC Berlin was renamed 1. SC Berlin on 23 April 1990. Sports club SC Berlin then emerged as the legal successor to 1. SC Berlin at the turn of the year. Several more departments became independent or joined other clubs. The former men's handball team of SC Dynamo Berlin joined SV Preußen Berlin and formed handball club HC Preußen Berlin. The men's volleyball players joined SCC Berlin and the women's handball players joined CJD Berlin. The focus of SC Berlin in the following years was primarily swimming, figure skating and speed skating. Successful swimmers of the club during this period were Steffen Zesner, Daniela Hunger and Ingolf Rasch. Budō athletes of SC Berlin founded a new SC Dynamo Hoppegarten in 1996.

SC Berlin had 3,100 members as of 2025. The club has 15 departments in various sports and has produced numerous Olympic athletes of Germany. The sports club is still based in the Sportforum Hohenschönhausen.

== Honours ==
SC Dynamo Berlin produced numerous well-known athletes, including Christoph Höhne (racewalking), Ilona Slupianek (shot put), Karin Janz (gymnastics), Maxi Gnauck (artistic gymnastics), Axel Peschel (cycle racing), Joachim Ziesche and Dietmar Peters (ice hockey), Helga Haase (speed skating), and Barbara Krause (swimming).
