= Weißwasser =

Town in Saxony, Germany

Weißwasser Běła Woda
- Town
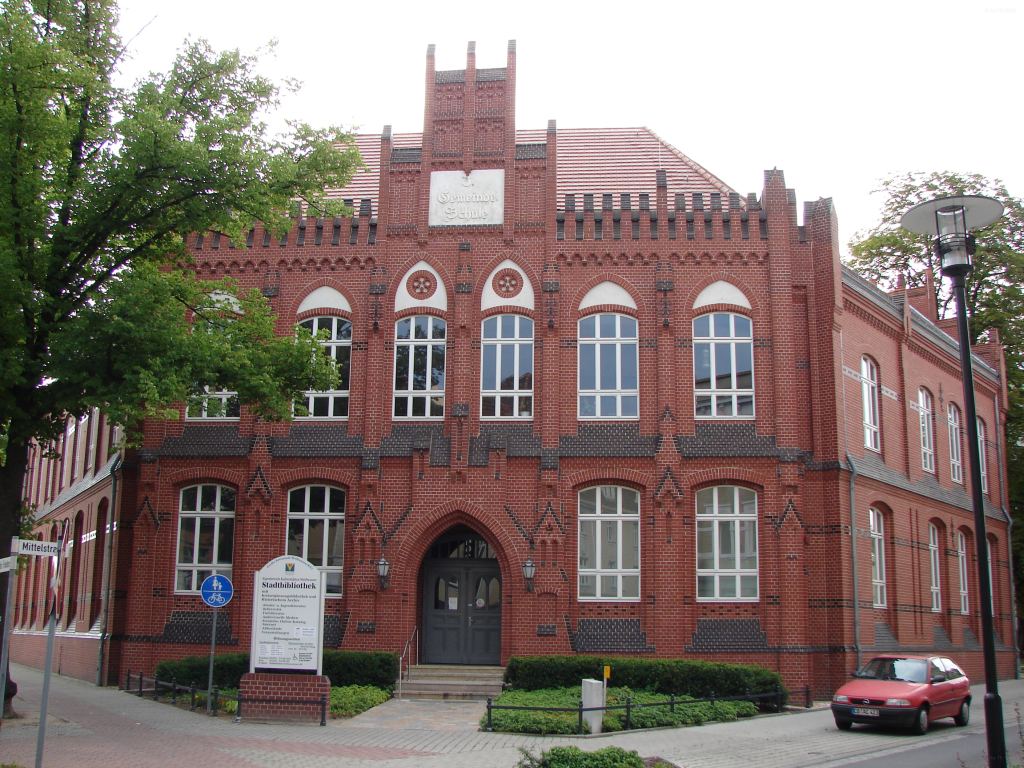
- Library

- Coat of arms

- Location of Weißwasser; Běła Woda within Görlitz district
- Interactive map of Weißwasser; Běła Woda
- Location within Germany Location within Saxony
- Coordinates: 51°30′N 14°38′E
- Country: Germany
- State: Saxony
- District: Görlitz

Government
  - Mayor (2017–24): Torsten Pötzsch

Area
  - Total: 63.42 km^{2} (24.49 sq mi)
- Elevation: 140 m (460 ft)

Population (2025-12-31)
  - Total: 14,887
  - Density: 234.7/km^{2} (608.0/sq mi)
- Demonym(s): German: Weißwasseraner; Upper Sorbian: Běłowodźan (m.), Běłowodźanka (f.)
- Time zone: UTC+01:00 (CET)
  - Summer (DST): UTC+02:00 (CEST)
- Postal codes: 02943
- Dialling codes: 03576
- Vehicle registration: GR, LÖB, NOL, NY, WSW, ZI
- Website: www.weisswasser.de

Weißwasser (German pronunciation: [ˈvaɪsˌvasɐ]; Upper Sorbian: Běła Woda [ˈbʲɪwa ˈwɔda] ; all of them lit. 'White Water') is a town in Upper Lusatia in eastern Saxony, Germany.

Weißwasser is the third largest town in the Görlitz district after Görlitz and Zittau. The town's landmark is its water tower. The town is part of the recognized Sorbian settlement area in Saxony. Upper Sorbian has an official status next to German, all villages bear names in both languages.

== History ==
Weißwasser was mentioned for the first time on 8 June 1552, when it was part of the Lands of the Bohemian Crown in the Holy Roman Empire. The town's name means "white water". In 1635 it passed to the Electorate of Saxony, and following the Napoleonic Wars, in 1815 it fell to the Kingdom of Prussia and was included within the Province of Silesia. In the 19th and 20th centuries, Weißwasser was the European centre of glass production. It became part of the Prussian Province of Lower Silesia in 1919.

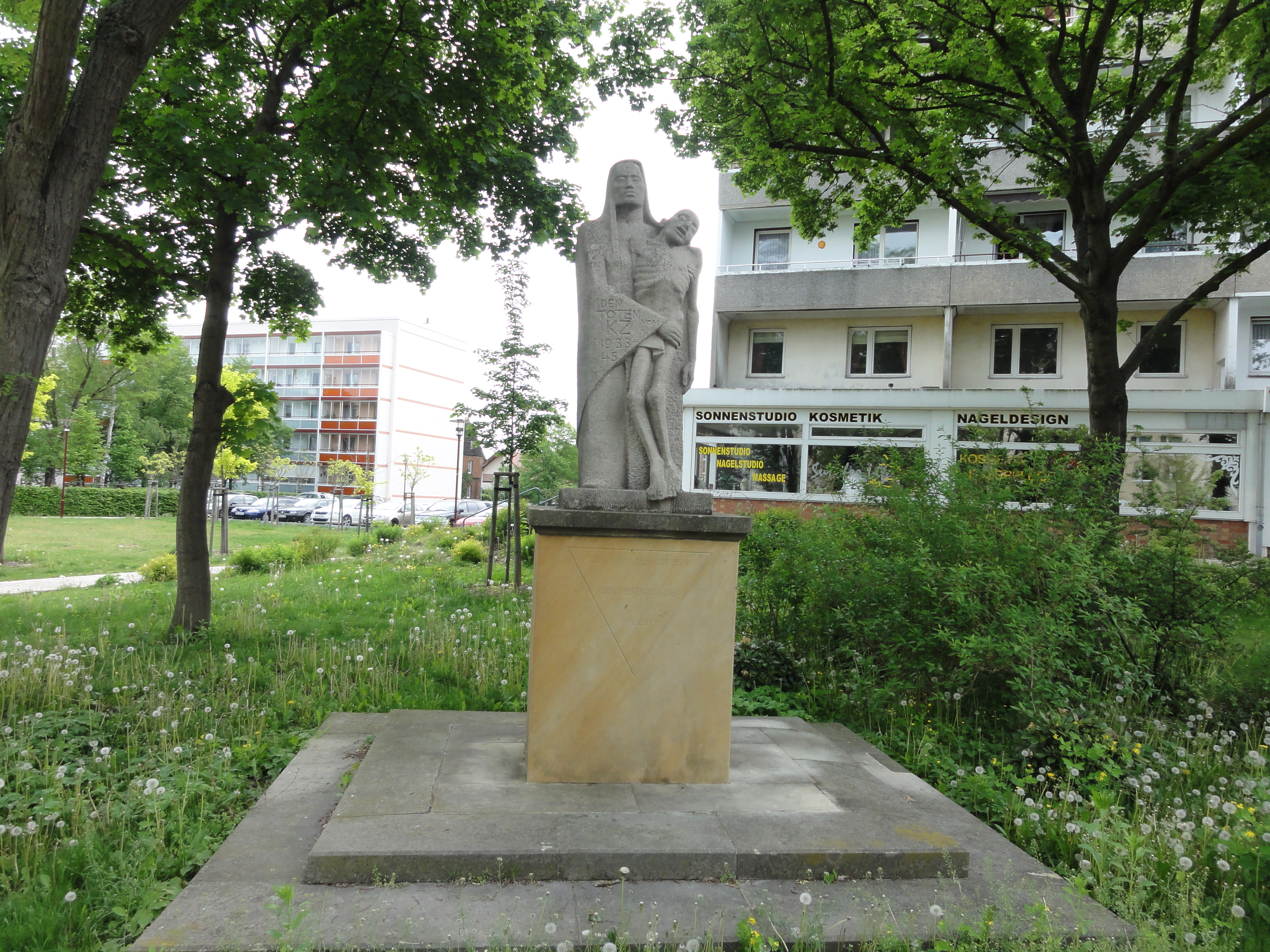
Memorial to the victims of the local concentration camp

Weißwasser received its town charter on 28 August 1935. During World War II, the Nazis established and operated the FAL Weisswasser subcamp of the Gross-Rosen concentration camp, whose prisoners were mainly Jewish women. In the Second World War, 40% of the town was destroyed. With the dissolution of Prussia resulting from the war, the town became part of Saxony from 1945–52. It was then part of communist East Germany from 1952–90 and administered within Bezirk Cottbus. Many enterprises had to close during the communist regime. After the fall of the Berlin Wall, only a few enterprises were left. It was included within a restored Saxony after German reunification.

Weißwasser now struggles with the after-effects of German reunification, as the fall of the Berlin Wall has had a devastating effect on the local economy. Many people have since lost their jobs and the town's population continues to suffers from a high percentage of unemployment. Consequently, many have left the area in the hope of finding a new job elsewhere in a reunited Germany.

In September 2005, Weißwasser hosted the "Tag der Sachsen." The event was a success with more than 300,000 visitors, which left some believing that the town could reinvent itself as a tourist attraction.

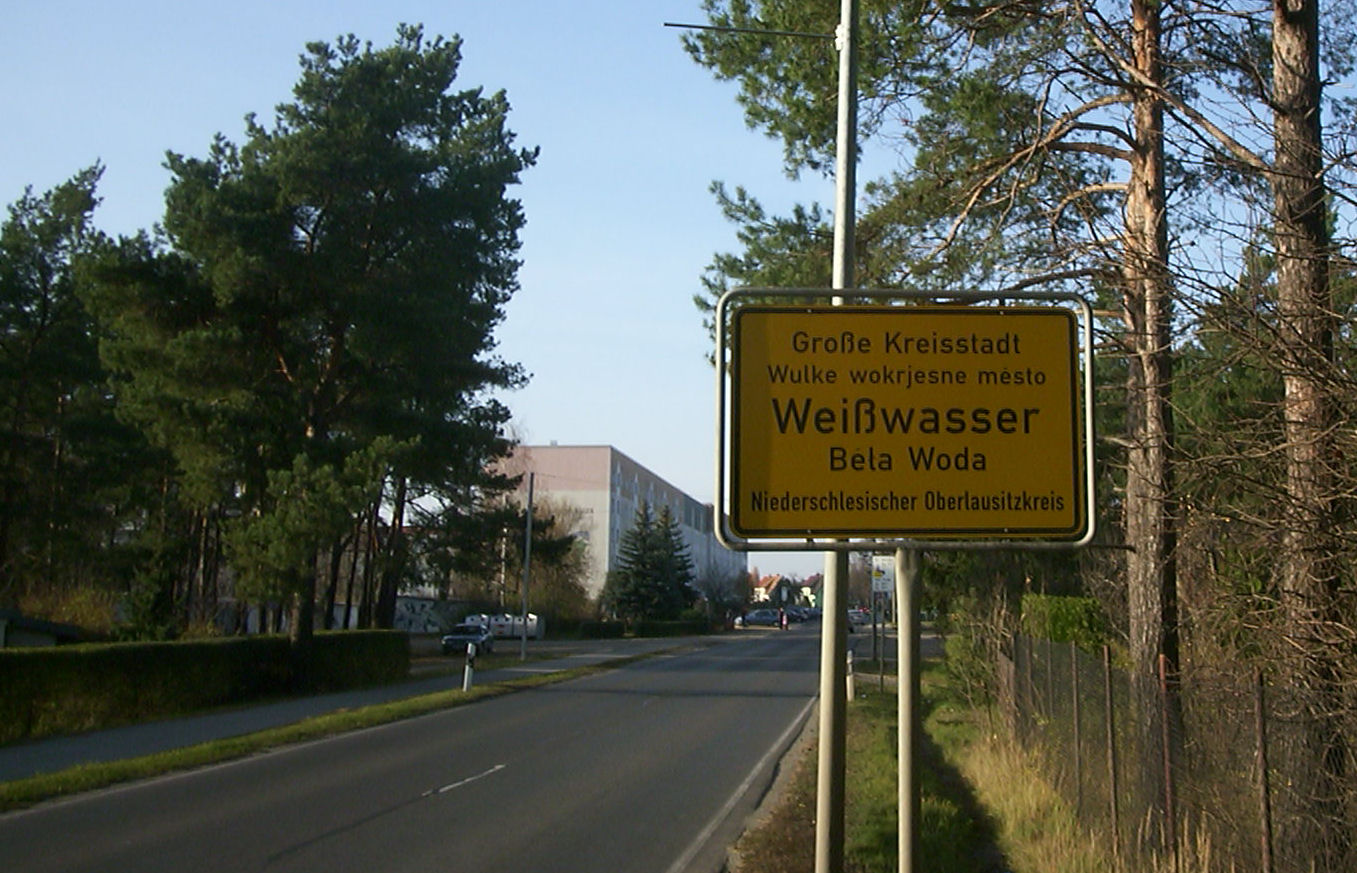
Bilingual German-Upper Sorbian town limit sign

There are bilingual street signs in German and Upper Sorbian in the town.

=== Coat of arms ===
The coat of arms was allotted on 31 January 1927. The two green glasses symbolise the glass industry of the town, which was one of the largest in former East Germany. The tools are a reference to coal mining, which is carried out close to the city. Blue and yellow are the traditional colours of Upper Lusatia and the white waves in the bottom part of the coat of arms symbolise the name of the city.

=== Population development ===
Development of the population figure since 31 December 1960

Historical population

Year	Pop.	±% p.a.
1825	390	—
1933	13,494	+3.34%
1939	14,388	+1.07%
1946	12,940	−1.50%
1950	13,844	+1.70%
1960	14,028	+0.13%
1981	32,799	+4.13%
1984	34,994	+2.18%

Year	Pop.	±% p.a.
1988	38,288	+2.27%
1995	31,745	−2.64%
1997	30,300	−2.30%
1998	28,605	−5.59%
1999	27,315	−4.51%
2000	26,107	−4.42%
2001	24,815	−4.95%
2002	23,862	−3.84%

Year	Pop.	±% p.a.
2003	22,966	−3.75%
2004	22,758	−0.91%
2005	21,912	−3.72%
2006	20,823	−4.97%
2007	20,298	−2.52%
2008	19,927	−1.83%
2009	19,615	−1.57%
2010	19,416	−1.01%

Source from 1998 on: Statistics office Saxony

== Politics ==
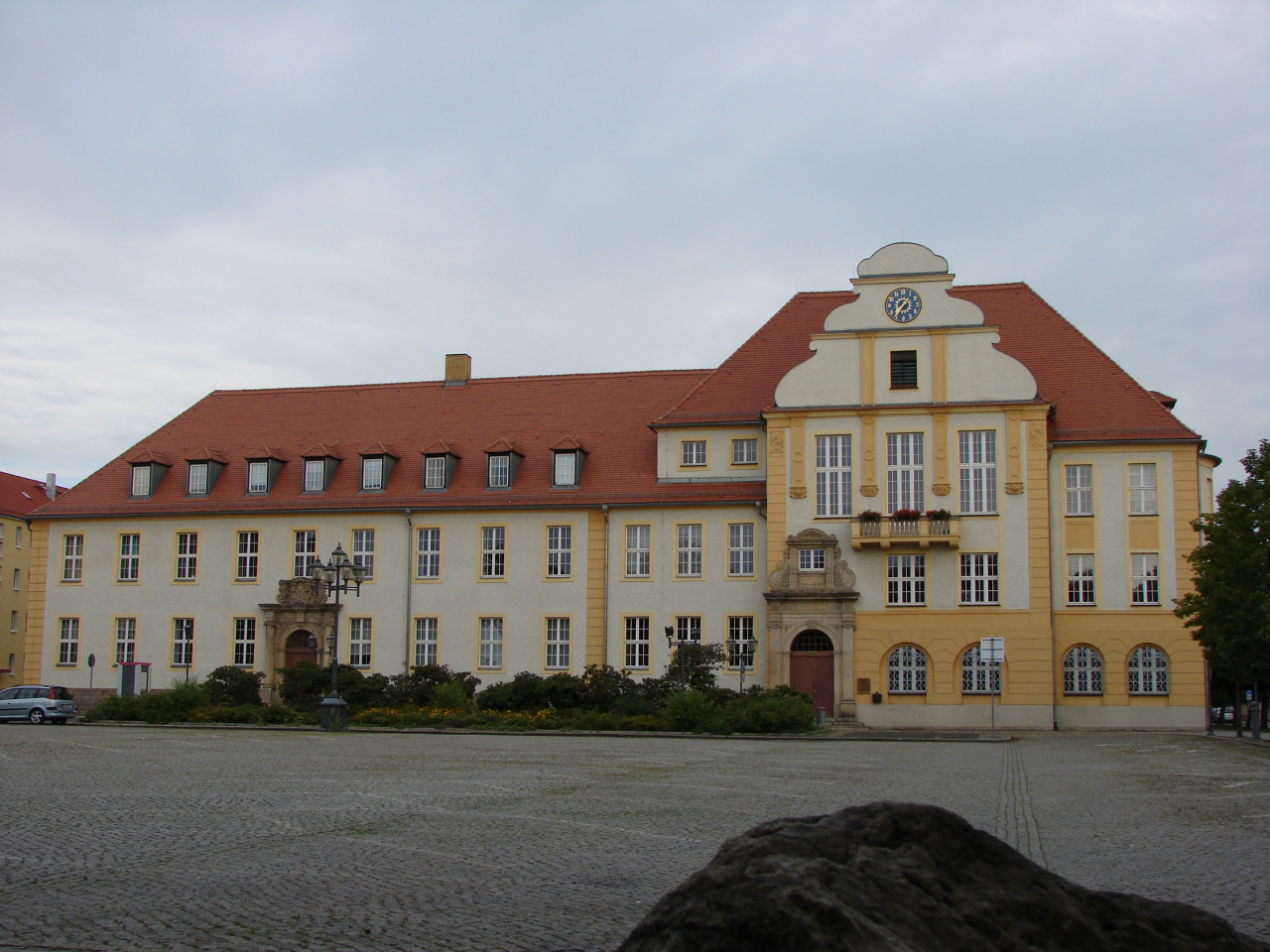
Town Hall

A new city council was elected on the 13 June 2004. Out of 18,653 eligible voters, 29.36% participated in the vote. The results were as following:

- 27.68 % PDS
- 27.01 % CDU
- 18.54 % Wir für Hier e.V.
- 12.70 % SPD
- 6.96 % Klartext
- 3.84 % FDP
- 3.26 % NPD

=== Twin cities ===
- Brühl (North Rhine-Westphalia)
- Żary (Poland)

== Sights ==
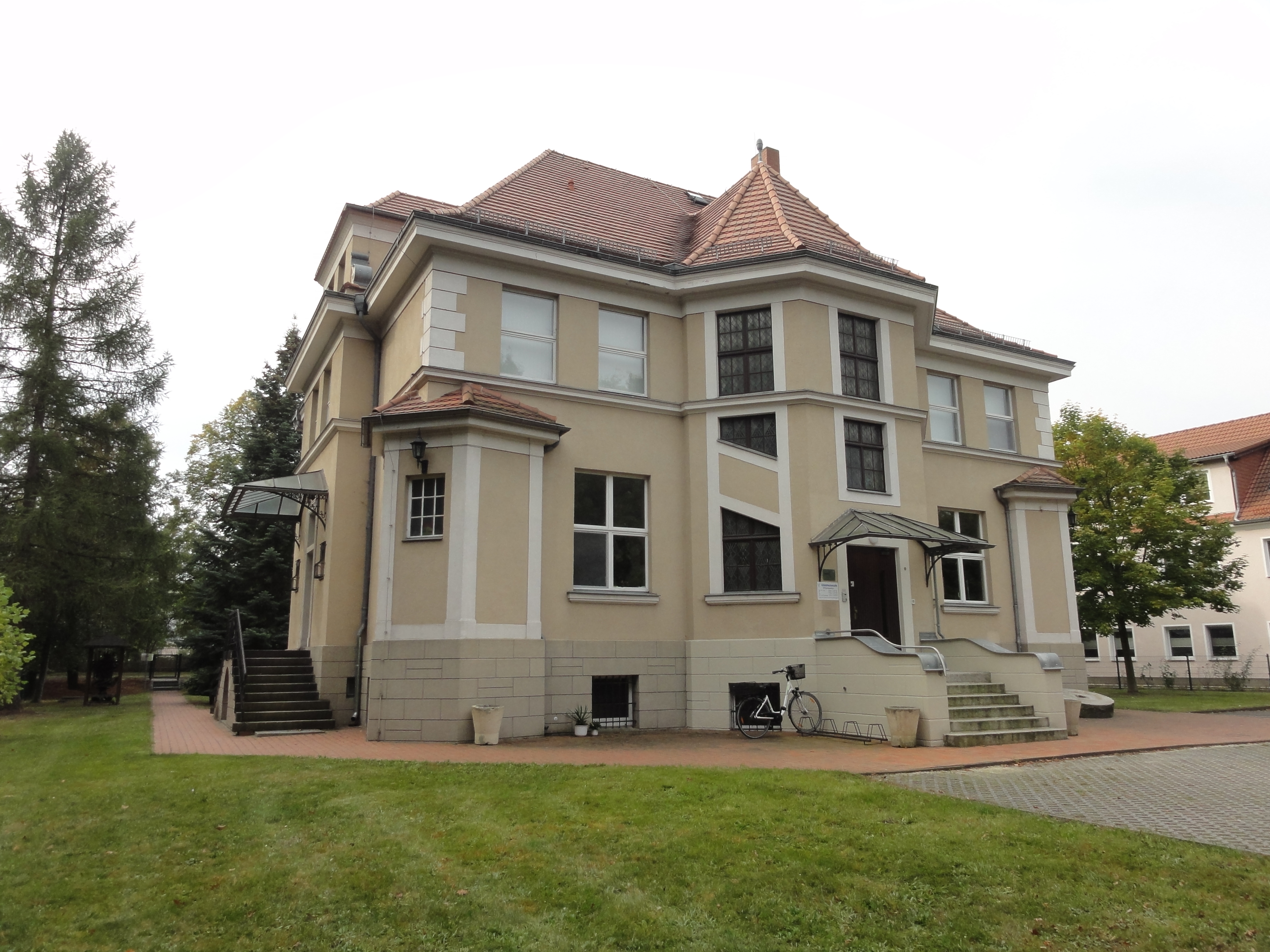
Glass museum

- Water Tower
- Ice Hockey Stadium "Fuchsbau" (fox's den)
- Glass museum
- Zoo
- Pückler - Park in Bad Muskau
- Rhododendron - Park in Kromlau
- Forest Railway Muskau
- Braunsteich - Lake
- Erratic Rock - Park in Nochten
- Opencast pit in Nochten

== Sport ==
The local ice hockey club Dynamo Weißwasser, known presently as Lausitzer Füchse and also known as "The Foxes", was the most successful club in the ice hockey Premier League of former East Germany, winning 25 championships.

== Notable people ==
- Tino Chrupalla (born 1975), politician and co-chairman of the Alternative for Germany
- Joachim Franke (1940–2024), ice hockey player
- Roland Hemmo (born 1946), voice actor and actor
- Klaus Hirche (1939-2022), hockey goalkeeper and coach, national team GDR, 1968 Olympian
- Rudolf Lange (1910–1945), SS officer and Wannsee Conference attendee
- Christa Luding-Rothenburger (born 1959), speed skater and cyclist
- Angela Ranft (born 1969), cyclist
- Günter Schubert (1938–2008), actor and voice actor
