= Lausitzer Füchse =

German ice hockey team

EHC Lausitzer Füchse
- City: Weißwasser, Saxony
- League: DEL2
- Founded: 1932; 94 years ago
- Home arena: Eisarena Weißwasser (capacity: 3,050)
- Colours: Blue, yellow
- General manager: Dirk Rohrbach
- Head coach: TBC
- Captain: Clarke Breitkreuz
- Website: www.lausitzer-fuechse.de

Franchise history
- 1950–1952: BSG Ostglas Weißwasser
- 1952–1953: BSG Chemie Weißwasser
- 1953–1990: SG Dynamo Weißwasser
- 1990–1991: PEV Weißwasser
- 1991–1994: ES Weißwasser
- 1994–2002: ESG Sachsen „Die Füchse" Weißwasser/Chemnitz
- 2002–present: EHC Lausitzer Füchse GmbH

The Lausitzer Füchse (literally Lusatian Foxes; Upper Sorbian: Łužiske liški) is an ice hockey team based in Weißwasser, Saxony. They currently play in DEL2, the second level of ice hockey in Germany. Prior to the 2013–14 season they played in the 2nd Bundesliga. The Weißwasser U23 team, ES Weißwasser, currently plays in the Regionalliga East.

== History ==
The team was founded already in 1932 but is most significant for its remarkable domination as SG Dynamo Weißwasser in the GDR ice hockey league with over 25 championships. The club was affiliated to SV Dynamo, which was the sports association of the East German police, state security service and customs. After the German reunification the team could not hold its strength, financial problems and relegations followed.

After the 2006–07 season, the team has won the best-of-seven play-down series against Dresdner Eislöwen with 4-2 and remains in the 2nd Bundesliga while the Eislöwen have to play in the Oberliga in the 2007/2008 season.

Since the 2008–09 season in second German league, there were six qualifications for the playoffs or pre-playoffs.

== Honours ==
East German ice hockey champions: (25) - 1951, 1952, 1953, 1954, 1955, 1956, 1957, 1958, 1959, 1960, 1961, 1962, 1963, 1964, 1965, 1969, 1970, 1971, 1972, 1973, 1974, 1975, 1981, 1989, 1990

== See also ==
- German champions (ice hockey)
