= DDR-Oberliga (ice hockey) =

East German sports league

- Sport: Ice hockey
- Founded: 1949
- Folded: 1990
- No. of teams: 2 (from 1970)
- Country: East Germany
- Last champions: SG Dynamo Weißwasser (1989-90)
- Most titles: SG Dynamo Weißwasser (25)

The Oberliga or DDR-Eishockey-Oberliga was the top level of ice hockey in East Germany. From 1949 to 1970, the increasingly popular sport of ice hockey saw the creation of a variety of leagues, with the Oberliga at the top level. However, in 1970 funding for all but two ice hockey teams (SG Dynamo Weißwasser and SC Dynamo Berlin) was abruptly ended by the Politburo. Some of the de-funded teams went on to participate in the DDR-Bestenermittlung, an unofficial continuation of the former "Gruppenliga" (the second league below the Oberliga until 1970).

== Teams ==
=== 1970-1990 ===
- SG Dynamo Weißwasser
- SC Dynamo Berlin

=== 1949-1970 ===
- SG Dynamo Weißwasser (Previously known as BSG Ostlgas Weißwasser and BSG Chemie Weißwasser.)
- SC Dynamo Berlin
- SV Deutsche Volkspolizei Berlin
- TSC Berlin
- Empor Rostock
- Turbine Erfurt
- ASK Crimmitschau
- Einheit Dresden
- SC Karl-Marx-Stadt
- SG Frankenhausen (became BSG Zwickau in 1955 and SC Karl-Marx-Stadt in 1956.)
- SG Apolda
- SG Schierke
- SG Grün Weiß Pankow

== Past winners ==
- 1949 SG Frankenhausen
- 1950 SG Frankenhausen
- 1951 BSG Ostglas Weißwasser
- 1952 BSG Chemie Weißwasser
- 1953 BSG Chemie Weißwasser
- 1954 SG Dynamo Weißwasser
- 1955 SG Dynamo Weißwasser
- 1956 SG Dynamo Weißwasser
- 1957 SG Dynamo Weißwasser
- 1958 SG Dynamo Weißwasser
- 1959 SG Dynamo Weißwasser
- 1960 SG Dynamo Weißwasser
- 1961 SG Dynamo Weißwasser
- 1962 SG Dynamo Weißwasser
- 1963 SG Dynamo Weißwasser
- 1964 SG Dynamo Weißwasser
- 1965 SG Dynamo Weißwasser
- 1966 SC Dynamo Berlin
- 1967 SC Dynamo Berlin
- 1968 SC Dynamo Berlin
- 1969 SG Dynamo Weißwasser
- 1970 SG Dynamo Weißwasser
- 1971 SG Dynamo Weißwasser
- 1972 SG Dynamo Weißwasser
- 1973 SG Dynamo Weißwasser
- 1974 SG Dynamo Weißwasser
- 1975 SG Dynamo Weißwasser
- 1976 SC Dynamo Berlin
- 1977 SC Dynamo Berlin
- 1978 SC Dynamo Berlin
- 1979 SC Dynamo Berlin
- 1980 SC Dynamo Berlin
- 1981 SG Dynamo Weißwasser
- 1982 SC Dynamo Berlin
- 1983 SC Dynamo Berlin
- 1984 SC Dynamo Berlin
- 1985 SC Dynamo Berlin
- 1986 SC Dynamo Berlin
- 1987 SC Dynamo Berlin
- 1988 SC Dynamo Berlin
- 1989 SG Dynamo Weißwasser
- 1990 SG Dynamo Weißwasser

== See also ==
- East Germany national ice hockey team
- DDR-Bestenermittlung
