= Breitkreuz =

Breitkreuz is a surname. Notable people with the surname include:

- Brett Breitkreuz (born 1989), Canadian ice hockey player
- Clarke Breitkreuz (born 1991), Canadian ice hockey player
- Cliff Breitkreuz (born 1940), Canadian politician
- Christoph Breitkreuz (born 1955), German geologist
- Garry Breitkreuz (born 1945), Canadian politician
- Tim Breitkreuz (born 1994), German politician
