= Frédérik Cabana =

Canadian ice hockey player

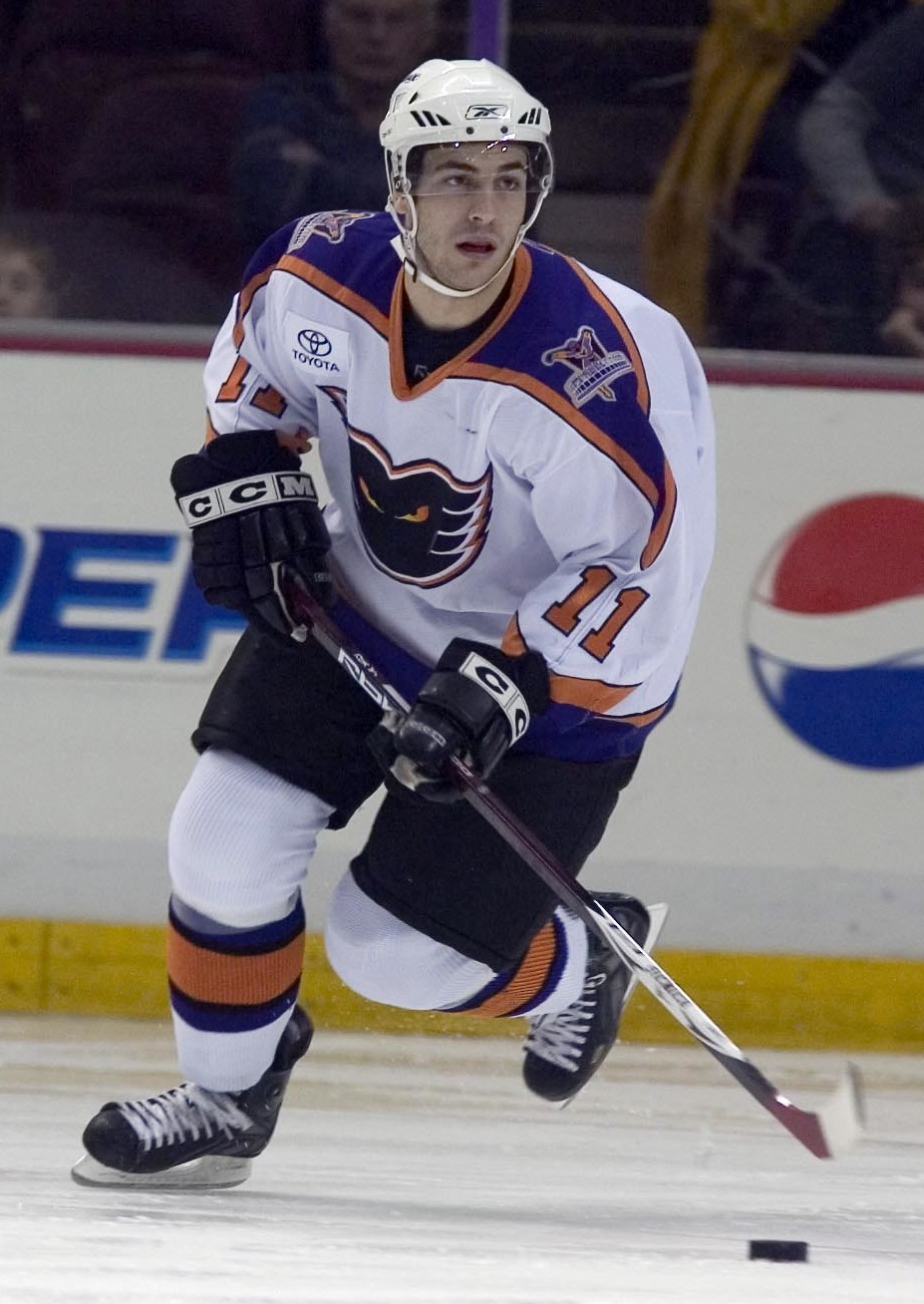
- Cabana with the Philadelphia Phantoms in 2006
- Born: May 16, 1986 (age 40) Fleurimont, Quebec, Canada
- Height: 6 ft 0 in (183 cm)
- Weight: 182 lb (83 kg; 13 st 0 lb)
- Position: Left wing
- Shoots: Left
- DEL2 team Former teams: Rote Teufel Bad Nauheim; Philadelphia Phantoms; Hamburg Freezers
- NHL draft: 171st overall, 2004; Philadelphia Flyers
- Playing career: 2006–present

Frédérik Cabana (born May 16, 1986) is a Canadian professional ice hockey left winger who currently plays for Rote Teufel Bad Nauheim of the DEL2.

== Playing career ==
Frederik Cabana began his playing career by playing for the Halifax Mooseheads of the Quebec Major Junior Hockey League. After two successful years with the team, Cabana was drafted by the Philadelphia Flyers in the 2004 NHL entry draft in the 6th round, 171 overall.

On May 30, 2006, the Philadelphia Flyers announced that they had signed him to a three-year entry-level contract. "I am really happy," said Cabana. "It is a dream come true, first getting drafted by the Flyers and now getting signed by the team. It is great. I am more of an all-around player. I am good defensively and I can agitate players on the ice and do anything to help my team win."

Following Flyers training camp, he was sent down to the Philadelphia Phantoms, the AHL affiliate of the Flyers, where he played his first season of professional ice hockey.

In 2009, Cabana moved to the German 2nd Bundesliga with Heilbronner Falken. After one season, he moved within the league to rivals Ravensburg Towerstars. In three seasons with Ravensburg, Cabana was amongst the team's offensive leaders. In his final season, Cabana led the club with 22 goals and 53 points in only 43 games.

On July 29, 2013, he was signed to a two-year contract with top tier DEL club, the Hamburg Freezers.

Frederik has a brother, Michael, who plays for the Sherbrooke Saint-Francois of the LNAH.

== Career statistics ==
=== Regular season and playoffs ===
			Regular season					Playoffs
Season	Team	League	GP	G	A	Pts	PIM	GP	G	A	Pts	PIM
2001–02	Magog Cantonniers	QMAAA	37	20	16	36	134	—	—	—	—	—
2002–03	Halifax Mooseheads	QMJHL	62	4	10	14	65	24	7	1	8	50
2003–04	Halifax Mooseheads	QMJHL	70	17	21	38	78	—	—	—	—	—
2004–05	Halifax Mooseheads	QMJHL	59	10	24	34	47	11	6	6	12	11
2005–06	Halifax Mooseheads	QMJHL	68	17	24	41	85	11	1	3	4	17
2006–07	Philadelphia Phantoms	AHL	61	4	15	19	78	—	—	—	—	—
2007–08	Philadelphia Phantoms	AHL	48	9	7	16	75	3	0	0	0	5
2008–09	Philadelphia Phantoms	AHL	4	0	1	1	2	—	—	—	—	—
2008–09	Mississippi Sea Wolves	ECHL	6	4	3	7	4	—	—	—	—	—
2008–09	Sherbrooke Saint–François	LNAH	3	4	1	5	4	—	—	—	—	—
2008–09	Dornbirner EC	AUT.2	9	9	6	15	34	10	7	0	7	27
2009–10	Heilbronner Falken	GER.2	29	16	25	41	74	6	2	4	6	16
2010–11	Ravensburg Towerstars	GER.2	38	15	23	38	81	12	7	12	19	22
2011–12	Ravensburg Towerstars	GER.2	37	20	24	44	90	4	0	0	0	27
2012–13	Ravensburg Towerstars	GER.2	43	22	31	53	70	11	7	3	10	59
2013–14	Hamburg Freezers	DEL	18	3	7	10	41	12	0	0	0	4
2014–15	Hamburg Freezers	DEL	4	0	0	0	4	—	—	—	—	—
2014–15	Bietigheim Steelers	DEL2	20	10	15	25	6	12	5	7	12	6
2015–16	Bietigheim Steelers	DEL2	46	29	20	49	52	5	0	1	1	24
2016–17	Bietigheim Steelers	DEL2	28	10	16	26	24	4	0	3	3	8
2017–18	Bietigheim Steelers	DEL2	25	11	11	22	6	15	6	8	14	65
2018–19	Bietigheim Steelers	DEL2	29	7	19	26	12	7	5	5	10	10
2019–20	Bietigheim Steelers	DEL2	50	12	21	33	52	2	0	0	0	6
2020–21	EC Bad Nauheim	DEL2	38	18	11	29	12	—	—	—	—	—
2021–22	Bayreuth Tigers	DEL2	44	12	18	30	12	—	—	—	—	—
AHL totals			113	13	23	36	155	3	0	0	0	5
GER.2 & DEL2 totals			427	182	234	416	491	78	32	43	75	243

=== International ===
Year	Team	Event	GP	G	A	Pts	PIM
2003	Canada	U18	5	1	0	1	2
2004	Canada	WJC18	7	1	4	5	18
Junior totals			12	2	4	6	20
