= Brett Breitkreuz =

Canadian-German ice hockey player

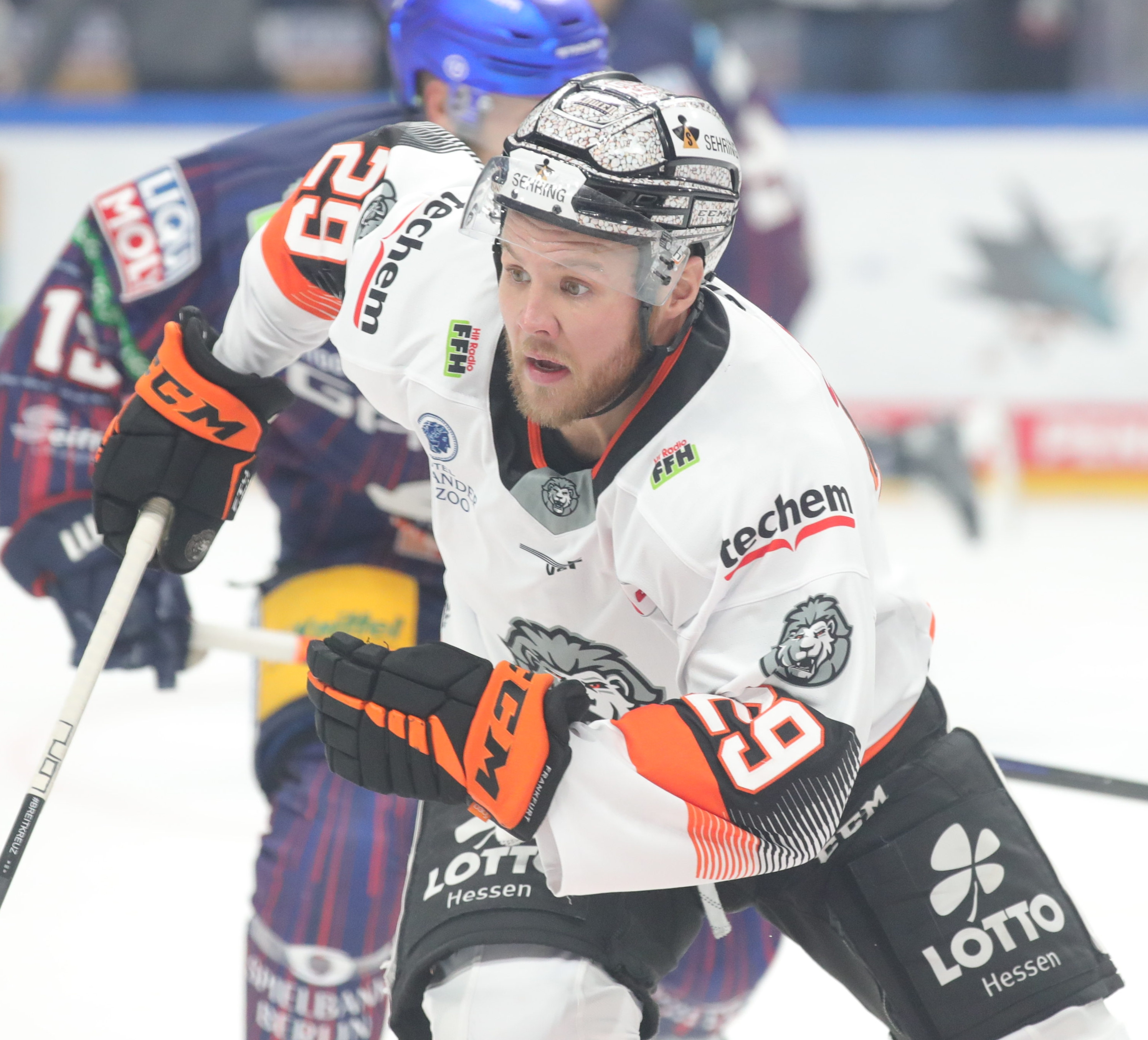
- Born: April 6, 1989 (age 35); Springside, Saskatchewan, Canada
- Height: 6 ft 1 in (185 cm)
- Weight: 207 lb (94 kg; 14 st 11 lb)
- Position: Left wing
- Shot: Left
- Played for: Kölner Haie; Augsburger Panther; Löwen Frankfurt
- NHL draft: Undrafted
- Playing career: 2010–2024

Brett Breitkreuz (born April 6, 1989) is a Canadian-German former professional ice hockey player. He most notably played in the Deutsche Eishockey Liga (DEL).

== Playing career ==
As a junior player, he was active in the Western Hockey League and played his first season (2006-07) for the Kelowna Rockets. For the next season he was acquired by the new team in this league the Edmonton Oil Kings. In his second season for the Kings (2008-09), he scored 55 points (19 goals, 36 assists), was alternate captain and got with his team the play-offs for the first time in his history.

During the 2009-10 season, in January 2010, Breitkreuz was traded to the Vancouver Giants.

After his junior career, he moved to Germany, where his father came from, and previously played with Kölner Haie for three seasons before signing with the Augsburger Panther on a one-year contract on April 23, 2013.

On May 26, 2015, Breitkreuz moved to the German second tier DEL2, joining his brother Clarke Breitkreuz, in signing a one-year contract with Löwen Frankfurt.

Following three years in his second stint with Frankfurt, Breitkreuz announced his retirement at the conclusion of the 2023–24 season, ending his 14-year professional career.

== Career statistics ==
			Regular season					Playoffs
Season	Team	League	GP	G	A	Pts	PIM	GP	G	A	Pts	PIM
2006–07	Kelowna Rockets	WHL	58	8	6	14	67	—	—	—	—	—
2007–08	Edmonton Oil Kings	WHL	70	15	19	34	105	—	—	—	—	—
2008–09	Edmonton Oil Kings	WHL	72	19	36	55	86	5	0	1	1	9
2009–10	Edmonton Oil Kings	WHL	40	10	9	19	105	—	—	—	—	—
2009–10	Vancouver Giants	WHL	26	7	9	16	49	15	3	1	4	23
2010–11	Kölner Haie	DEL	47	3	1	4	76	5	0	0	0	4
2011–12	Kölner Haie	DEL	38	3	5	8	77	—	—	—	—	—
2012–13	Kölner Haie	DEL	35	3	0	3	45	1	0	0	0	0
2012–13	Füchse Duisburg	Germany3	12	0	7	7	34	7	1	5	6	29
2013–14	Augsburger Panther	DEL	52	6	6	12	76	—	—	—	—	—
2014–15	Augsburger Panther	DEL	51	4	4	8	86	—	—	—	—	—
2015–16	Löwen Frankfurt	DEL2	48	15	23	38	139	4	0	0	0	39
2016–17	Löwen Frankfurt	DEL2	50	17	16	33	98	14	13	9	23	8
2017–18	Löwen Frankfurt	DEL2	51	22	18	40	94	6	2	5	7	2
2018–19	Löwen Frankfurt	DEL2	42	16	17	33	38	15	7	4	11	22
2019–20	Bietigheim Steelers	DEL2	51	19	18	37	70	2	1	2	3	0
2020–21	Bietigheim Steelers	DEL2	46	24	21	45	56	10	2	4	6	4
2021–22	Foam Lake Flyers	LLHL	9	7	8	15	21	—	—	—	—	—
2021–22	Löwen Frankfurt	DEL2	22	7	11	18	4	12	7	9	16	11
2022–23	Löwen Frankfurt	DEL	41	13	11	24	28	2	0	0	0	0
2023–24	Löwen Frankfurt	DEL	44	5	9	14	23	—	—	—	—	—
DEL totals			308	37	36	73	411	8	0	0	0	4
