= Andreas Driendl =

German professional ice hockey player

- Born: January 26, 1986 (age 39); Schongau, West Germany
- Height: 6 ft 1 in (185 cm)
- Weight: 194 lb (88 kg; 13 st 12 lb)
- Position: Left wing
- Shot: Left
- Played for: EV Füssen; Hamburg Freezers; Krefeld Pinguine; SC Riessersee; Ravensburg Towerstars
- NHL draft: Undrafted
- Playing career: 2003–2022

Andreas Driendl (born January 26, 1986) is a German professional ice hockey player. He is currently playing for SC Riessersee of the DEL2. He has formerly played in the Deutsche Eishockey Liga (DEL) with the Hamburg Freezers and Krefeld Pinguine.

== Career statistics ==
			Regular season					Playoffs
Season	Team	League	GP	G	A	Pts	PIM	GP	G	A	Pts	PIM
2002–03	EV Füssen U20	Junioren-BL	3	0	0	0	6	—	—	—	—	—
2003–04	EV Füssen	Germany3	12	1	2	3	10	16	4	3	7	18
2004–05	EV Füssen	Germany3	38	8	10	18	76	—	—	—	—	—
2004–05	EV Füssen U20	Junioren-BL	3	1	2	3	29	—	—	—	—	—
2005–06	EV Füssen	Germany3	33	17	18	35	81	—	—	—	—	—
2005–06	EV Füssen U20	Junioren-BL	2	0	1	1	8	—	—	—	—	—
2006–07	Eisbären Regensburg	Germany2	47	8	10	18	38	4	0	0	0	2
2007–08	Hamburg Freezers	DEL	4	0	0	0	0	—	—	—	—	—
2007–08	Eisbären Regensburg	Germany2	46	6	9	15	72	—	—	—	—	—
2008–09	Krefeld Pinguine	DEL	50	5	7	12	38	7	0	2	2	14
2009–10	Krefeld Pinguine	DEL	50	4	6	10	34	—	—	—	—	—
2010–11	Krefeld Pinguine	DEL	50	6	6	12	38	8	1	6	7	8
2011–12	Krefeld Pinguine	DEL	47	8	7	15	100	—	—	—	—	—
2012–13	Krefeld Pinguine	DEL	50	16	19	35	44	9	1	6	7	20
2013–14	Krefeld Pinguine	DEL	47	6	14	20	58	5	0	1	1	10
2014–15	Krefeld Pinguine	DEL	41	13	10	23	61	3	0	1	1	2
2015–16	Krefeld Pinguine	DEL	51	14	18	32	56	—	—	—	—	—
2016–17	SC Riessersee	DEL2	47	23	17	40	82	3	0	1	1	2
2017–18	SC Riessersee	DEL2	48	30	49	79	38	18	5	13	18	41
2018–19	Ravensburg Towerstars	DEL2	43	18	37	55	36	15	3	19	22	32
2019–20	Ravensburg Towerstars	DEL2	51	14	32	46	38	—	—	—	—	—
2020–21	Ravensburg Towerstars	DEL2	33	18	22	40	18	3	1	3	4	2
2021–22	Ravensburg Towerstars	DEL2	23	2	8	10	6	—	—	—	—	—
DEL totals			390	72	87	159	429	32	2	16	18	54
DEL2 totals			245	105	165	270	218	39	9	36	45	77
