= Shawn Weller =

American ice hockey player

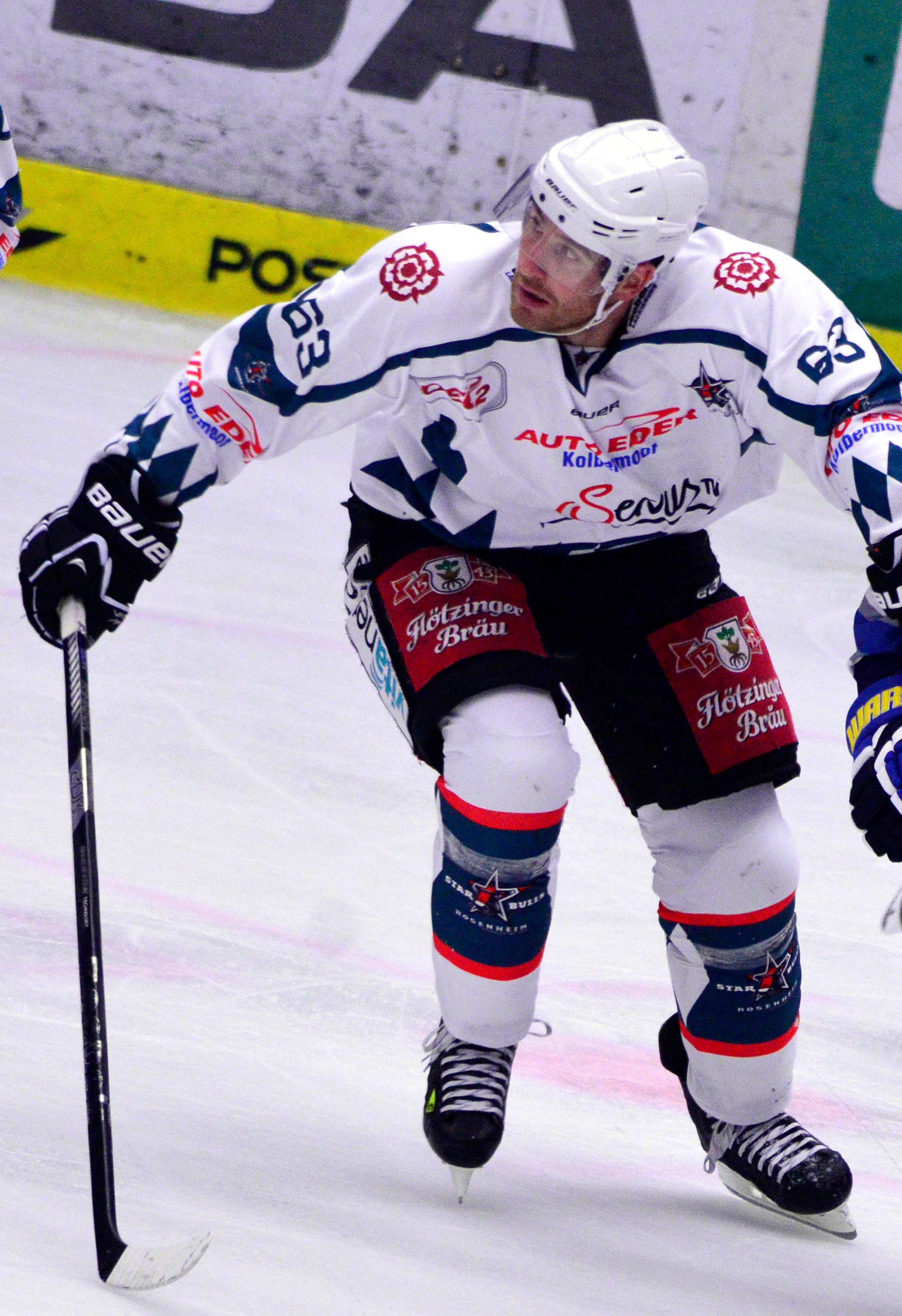
- Weller with Starbulls Rosenheim in 2013
- Born: July 8, 1986 (age 40) South Glens Falls, New York, U.S.
- Height: 6 ft 1 in (185 cm)
- Weight: 205 lb (93 kg; 14 st 9 lb)
- Position: Left wing
- Shot: Left
- Played for: Adirondack Thunder; Binghamton Senators; Abbotsford Heat; Manitoba Moose; St. John's IceCaps; Texas Stars; Starbulls Rosenheim; Ravensburg Towerstars; Dresdner Eislowen; SC Bietigheim-Bissingen; Tölzer Löwen
- NHL draft: 77th overall, 2004; Ottawa Senators
- Playing career: 2007–2023

Shawn Weller (born July 8, 1986) is an American professional ice hockey forward who most recently played for the Adirondack Thunder of the ECHL. He attended Clarkson University and graduated from South Glens Falls. Weller was drafted in the third round, 77th overall by the Ottawa Senators in the 2004 NHL entry draft

== Playing career ==
Weller played prep hockey for South Glens Falls High School until his sophomore year when he decided to play junior hockey with the Capital District Selects of the Eastern Junior Hockey League. Weller was playing for Capital District Select during his draft eligible year. He was named an EJHL All-Star and EJHL MVP prior to the 2004 draft. Weller was drafted in the third round, 77th overall by the Ottawa Senators in the 2004 NHL entry draft. The pick had been received in a trade with the Los Angeles Kings for Radek Bonk.

After being drafted, Weller enrolled in Clarkson University as a Business major. He played three seasons for the Clarkson Golden Knights. His freshman season began late due to NCAA eligibility issues that forced Weller to sit out the first four games of the season. However, once he was able to play, he scored his first two collegiate goals in his debut against Niagara on October 29, 2004. During the first round of the 2004 ECAC Hockey Tournament, the Golden Knights beat the Union Dutchmen in three games with Weller scoring the winning goal in overtime to win game three and help the Golden Knights advance to the quarterfinals. The Golden Knights eventually lost to the Harvard Crimson in the Championship match.

In his sophomore year, Weller increased his offensive scoring and recorded 14 goals, a new career high. He stepped it up again in his junior season by leading the Golden Knights in scoring with 41 points, including a team-high 19 goals, and was named to the ECAC All-Tournament Team. After Weller had finished the NCAA season with the Golden Knights, he was signed to an entry-level contract with the Senators on March 30, 2007. He made his professional debut with Ottawa's American Hockey League (AHL) affiliate, the Binghamton Senators for five games.

Weller was traded to the Anaheim Ducks on September 4, 2009, in exchange for Jason Bailey.

On July 26, 2010, Weller signed an AHL Contract, with the Manitoba Moose. He remained in the AHL the following season, splitting the year between the St. John's IceCaps and the Texas Stars.

On October 1, 2012, with limited AHL interest, Weller signed a one-year contract with ECHL club, the South Carolina Stingrays for the 2012–13 season. As captain of the Stingrays, Weller featured in 24 games for 15 points before he returned on loan to the St. John's IceCaps. On January 25, 2013, while with the IceCaps, Weller's ECHL rights were traded by the Stingrays to the Stockton Thunder. Weller finished the season with the Thunder, producing 11 points in 23 post-season games to help reach the Kelly Cup finals.

On August 3, 2013, Weller agreed to his first European contract on a one-year deal with German club, Starbulls Rosenheim of the DEL2. He played one season with club, scoring 70 points in 44 games. In May 2014, he signed with EV Ravensburg of the DEL2.

In the 2017–18 season, he captured the DEL2 championship with SC Bietigheim-Bissingen and was named Most Valuable Player of the playoffs.

Weller played seven seasons in the DEL2 before returning to North America and sitting out the pandemic shortened 2020–21 season. On August 6, 2021, Weller resumed his professional career in returning to the ECHL in signing with the Kansas City Mavericks. In the 2021–22 season, Weller made 19 appearances with the Mavericks before he was traded to the Adirondack Thunder in exchange for future considerations on January 13, 2022.

Upon signing a one-year contract with the Thunder in September 2023, Weller announced that he would be returning to the team for one more year, after which he would retire. However, his career would come to an early end suddenly and unceremoniously on November 9, 2023, when the team released him from his contract before he played a single regular season game. Weller stated in an interview that the reason for his release was an incident on October 13, 2023, when he accepted an alcoholic beverage from a fan at a preseason game in which he was not playing. He could not be released until a month later, when he was activated from injured reserve.

== Career statistics ==
=== Regular season and playoffs ===
			Regular season					Playoffs
Season	Team	League	GP	G	A	Pts	PIM	GP	G	A	Pts	PIM
2001–02	Glens Falls High School	HSNY	25	32	31	63		—	—	—	—	—
2002–03	Capital District Selects	EJHL	35	6	6	12	109	—	—	—	—	—
2003–04	Capital District Selects	EJHL	36	17	22	39	117	3	3	3	6	6
2004–05	Clarkson University	ECAC	33	3	11	14	72	—	—	—	—	—
2005–06	Clarkson University	ECAC	37	14	10	24	103	—	—	—	—	—
2006–07	Clarkson University	ECAC	39	19	21	40	62	—	—	—	—	—
2006–07	Binghamton Senators	AHL	5	0	0	0	4	—	—	—	—	—
2007–08	Binghamton Senators	AHL	59	8	8	16	40	—	—	—	—	—
2007–08	Elmira Jackals	ECHL	10	4	5	9	11	—	—	—	—	—
2008–09	Binghamton Senators	AHL	70	4	5	9	57	—	—	—	—	—
2008–09	Elmira Jackals	ECHL	4	1	1	2	2	—	—	—	—	—
2009–10	Bakersfield Condors	ECHL	42	18	28	46	55	—	—	—	—	—
2009–10	Abbotsford Heat	AHL	31	8	4	12	19	3	1	1	2	14
2010–11	Manitoba Moose	AHL	67	12	11	23	50	10	0	0	0	4
2011–12	St. John's IceCaps	AHL	41	10	14	24	28	—	—	—	—	—
2011–12	Texas Stars	AHL	18	2	1	3	6	—	—	—	—	—
2012–13	South Carolina Stingrays	ECHL	24	7	8	15	24	—	—	—	—	—
2012–13	St. John's IceCaps	AHL	3	0	0	0	0	—	—	—	—	—
2012–13	Stockton Thunder	ECHL	19	5	12	17	17	23	3	8	11	30
2013–14	Starbulls Rosenheim	DEL2	44	24	46	70	56	—	—	—	—	—
2014–15	Ravensburg Towerstars	DEL2	28	7	20	27	8	—	—	—	—	—
2014–15	Dresdner Eislöwen	DEL2	16	2	7	9	20	6	1	0	1	20
2015–16	Bietigheim Steelers	DEL2	42	5	26	31	46	12	5	13	18	26
2016–17	Bietigheim Steelers	DEL2	33	17	25	42	40	13	5	9	14	28
2017–18	Bietigheim Steelers	DEL2	50	25	42	67	140	11	9	5	14	18
2018–19	Bietigheim Steelers	DEL2	38	18	28	46	74	7	4	1	5	8
2019–20	Tölzer Löwen	DEL2	47	26	28	54	89	—	—	—	—	—
2021–22	Kansas City Mavericks	ECHL	19	1	5	6	6	—	—	—	—	—
2021–22	Adirondack Thunder	ECHL	22	0	5	5	10	—	—	—	—	—
2022–23	Adirondack Thunder	ECHL	51	14	13	27	49	5	1	0	1	2
AHL totals			294	44	43	87	204	13	1	1	2	18

=== International ===
Year	Team	Event	GP	G	A	Pts	PIM
2005	United States	WJC	7	0	0	0	2
Junior totals			7	0	0	0	2

== Awards and honors ==
Award	Year
ECAC Hockey All-Tournament Team	2007
