= 2017–18 DEL2 season =

- League: DEL2
- Sport: Ice Hockey
- Duration: 15 September 2017 – 22 April 2018
- Games: 364 (52 per team)
- Teams: 14
- TV partner: Sprade TV

Regular season
- Season champions: SC Riessersee
- Season MVP: Andreas Driendl (Riessersee)
- Top scorer: Richard Mueller (Riessersee)
- Relegated to Oberliga: SC Riessersee

Playoffs
- Champions: Bietigheim Steelers
- Runners-up: SC Riessersee
- Finals MVP: Shawn Weller (Bietigheim)

DEL2 seasons
- ← 2016–17 2018–19 →

The 2017–18 DEL2 season was the fifth season since the founding of the DEL2, the second tier of German ice hockey, set below the Deutsche Eishockey Liga. The season ran from 15 September 2017 till 22 April 2018. SC Riessersee was crowned league premiers by finishing top of the regular season standings. Bietigheim Steelers claimed the championship title by defeating SC Riessersee 4-1 in the final series. Bayreuth Tigers lost the relegation playoffs 4-1 against promoted team Tölzer Löwen, however they were saved from relegation from DEL2 to Oberliga due to SC Riessersee not being granted a DEL2 licence in the summer of 2018.

== Modus ==
Fourteen teams competed in the 2017–18 DEL2 regular season. Tölzer Löwen was promoted from Germany's third division, Oberliga. Each team played each other twice in the regular season, home and away, for a total of 52 matches each. The top six teams directly qualified for the championship playoffs, played in a best of seven format. Teams placed seven to ten advanced to the championship playoff qualifiers, which followed a best of three format. The bottom four teams enter the relegation playoffs. The two losing teams from round 1 face off in the relegation final with the losing team being relegated to Oberliga.

The DEL2 champion does not automatically get promoted to DEL. In September 2015, the DEL and DEL2 agreed to reintroduce promotion and relegation between the two leagues from the 2017–18 season onwards. The DEL2 champion would then have the opportunity to be promoted, provided it fulfilled the licensing requirements of the DEL, while the last-placed DEL club would be relegated.

== Regular season ==
=== Results ===
The cross table represents the results of all matches of the regular season. The home team is listed in the middle column, the visiting team in the top row.

First round														Team	Second round													
SCB	FRA	ECK	DRE	ESV	LFX	FRB	BTT	SCR	RVT	ECN	HNF	EPC	ECT	Team	SCB	FRA	ECK	DRE	ESV	LFX	FRB	BTT	SCR	RVT	ECN	HNF	EPC	ECT
	3:2	4:3^{O}	3:1	3:2	6:1	3:1	2:0	6:3	7:5	4:1	4:3	7:3	4:3	SCB		3:4^{S}	4:2	4:5	0:7	2:1^{S}	4:5^{O}	5:2	4:5^{S}	3:2^{O}	3:4	3:2^{O}	3:0	5:1
4:3^{O}		5:4	4:2	5:4^{O}	9:2	2:4	6:2	5:1	3:2	4:5^{S}	8:5	1:2^{O}	6:5	FRA	4:5^{O}		3:4^{O}	2:1^{O}	1:6	4:5^{O}	1:4	8:3	2:3^{O}	4:3	2:3	6:3	2:5	8:4
5:2	4:3^{O}		3:1	4:1	5:4^{O}	6:1	4:3^{O}	5:9	5:3	6:1	3:0	7:0	2:1	ECK	2:4	5:1		3:2	2:1	4:3^{O}	1:5	2:3^{O}	2:5	5:7	5:2	2:5	3:1	6:5^{S}
4:2	5:1	1:7		4:2	4:2	3:1	6:0	3:1	2:5	6:1	3:4^{O}	4:3^{O}	4:2	DRE	0:4	3:6	7:4		0:4	0:5	0:1	5:0	4:8	5:4^{O}	4:3	2:3	6:3	1:2
5:4^{O}	1:2	3:2^{O}	2:3		7:1	1:0	1:5	1:2	3:5	7:1	1:4	5:4^{O}	5:2	ESV	4:1	4:5	1:3	5:1		3:5	5:0	5:2	6:1	4:0	2:1	3:1	4:3	5:0
2:3	6:1	3:4^{O}	2:3^{S}	4:3^{O}		2:0	6:3	2:5	2:4	0:7	3:4^{O}	4:5^{O}	2:1	LFX	2:4	4:1	3:4	4:3	7:2		2:5	3:1	3:5	4:0	3:2	3:4^{O}	3:4^{O}	6:2
3:1	3:6	1:3	1:3	3:5	4:1		3:2^{O}	1:3	4:3	3:2^{O}	4:5^{O}	2:4	6:3	FRB	2:3	2:6	3:0	7:5	1:4	2:4		3:4^{O}	4:5^{S}	4:3^{S}	0:4	3:6	0:3	6:4
1:2	2:3^{O}	2:1^{O}	3:6	0:3	1:0	5:1		4:3	6:3	3:2	2:5	3:4	2:5	BTT	3:2^{S}	1:5	3:6	7:2	4:3^{O}	1:2	4:5		1:4	1:6	6:4	1:4	3:4	5:2
3:4^{O}	2:8	5:3	2:1^{O}	3:2^{O}	2:3^{S}	2:1	2:0		3:1	3:2	5:2	5:1	9:4	SCR	3:2^{O}	6:3	2:1	4:5	1:3	5:1	3:2	5:2		4:3^{O}	6:1	7:4	4:3	6:1
6:2	2:3^{O}	5:4	5:2	3:5	3:5	4:3	10:1	5:2		4:3	6:3	1:2	5:2	RVT	5:2	2:3	4:1	4:6	5:2	6:2	4:3^{S}	4:2	2:4		3:4^{O}	3:5	2:5	3:2^{O}
2:3^{S}	2:1^{O}	5:3	1:4	4:3	1:2	3:5	2:1	3:0	3:4^{S}		3:0	6:1	5:4	ECN	4:9	2:6	4:3^{O}	4:3^{O}	5:2	4:1	3:2	3:2	5:2	5:3		2:6	3:2	6:3
3:6	4:1	1:2	4:0	3:5	5:2	2:5	5:4^{S}	1:4	3:4^{O}	7:3		4:7	3:4^{O}	HNF	6:5^{S}	4:2	2:0	2:1	1:2^{O}	3:2	1:4	2:3^{S}	2:6	1:2	1:2		8:3	3:4
5:8	5:8	3:4^{S}	3:2^{O}	0:4	5:2	5:3	5:2	2:1	2:1	1:2	0:3		3:2	EPC	7:1	2:5	3:6	3:1	3:2^{O}	1:3	7:2	0:5	3:6	3:2	3:5	1:3		5:4^{O}
0:2	4:7	7:3	2:3	3:2^{O}	4:1	6:2	6:4	7:3	1:5	2:4	3:1	2:3		ECT	2:3	3:5	3:2	2:3	3:2	1:3	5:2	5:4^{O}	3:2	3:4^{O}	3:4	2:1^{O}	2:3^{S}	

Note: ^{O} Overtime; ^{S} Shootout

=== Standings ===
Pos	Team	GP	W	OTW	SOW	OTL	SOL	L	PTS	GF	GA	GD	PIM	HF	AF
1.	SC Riessersee (P) (R)	52	29	5	2	1	1	14	103	196	149	+47	464	17-4-2-3	12-3-0-11
2.	Bietigheim Steelers (C)	52	27	5	2	4	4	10	103	186	155	+31	746	16-4-3-3	11-3-5-7
3.	Löwen Frankfurt	52	25	4	2	7	1	13	95	207	174	+33	885	12-3-6-5	13-3-2-8
4.	ESV Kaufbeuren	52	24	4	0	6	0	18	86	174	130	+44	533	14-3-0-9	10-1-6-9
5.	EC Bad Nauheim	52	24	3	2	1	2	20	85	163	166	-3	499	15-3-2-6	9-2-1-14
6.	EC Kassel Huskies	52	21	6	2	5	0	18	84	180	160	+20	658	14-5-1-6	7-3-4-12
7.	Ravensburg Towerstars	52	21	3	2	4	2	20	79	190	168	+22	576	14-2-2-8	7-3-4-12
8.	Dresdner Eislöwen	52	22	2	1	5	0	22	77	155	164	-9	594	13-2-1-10	9-1-4-12
9.	Heilbronner Falken	52	19	4	2	5	1	21	75	167	167	+0	829	9-2-4-11	10-4-2-10
10.	Eispiraten Crimmitschau	52	19	6	1	2	1	23	74	158	181	-23	696	10-3-1-12	9-4-2-11
11.	Lausitzer Füchse	52	19	2	1	7	2	21	72	148	172	-24	563	11-1-6-8	8-2-3-13
12.	EHC Freiburg	52	16	3	1	2	2	28	60	142	176	-34	689	7-3-3-13	9-1-1-15
13.	Tölzer Löwen	52	13	4	0	3	2	30	52	156	199	-43	637	10-3-2-11	3-1-3-19
14.	Bayreuth Tigers	52	10	4	2	3	2	31	47	134	195	-61	529	8-3-1-14	2-3-4-17

Championship playoffs	Championship playoff qualifiers	Relegation playoffs

Points rules: 3 points for regulation win; 2 points for OT or SO win; 1 point for OT or SO loss; 0 points for regulation loss
Tie-break rules: 1) points; 2) head-to-head points; 3) head-to-head goal difference; 4) head-to-head number of goals scored.
(C) Champions; (P) Premiers; (R) Relegated

=== Top scorers ===
Name	Team	GP	G	A	PTS	PIM	+/−
Richard Mueller	SC Riessersee	51	36	44	80	20	+33
Andreas Driendl	SC Riessersee	48	30	49	79	38	+34
Matt McKnight	Bietigheim Steelers	52	34	44	78	16	+14
Jordan Knackstedt	ETC Crimmitschau	51	22	46	68	122	+15
Shawn Weller	Bietigheim Steelers	50	25	42	67	140	+14
Sami Blomqvist	ESV Kaufbeuren	52	31	35	66	26	+26
C.J. Stretch	Löwen Frankfurt	50	28	37	65	72	+30
Tyler McNeely	Bietigheim Steelers	47	22	43	65	68	+12
Charlie Sarault	ESV Kaufbeuren	51	21	44	65	12	+20
Robbie Czarnik	ETC Crimmitschau	52	37	27	64	50	+16

=== Top goaltenders ===
Name	Team	GP	SO	MP	GA	GAA	SH	SV	SV%
Stefan Vajs	ESV Kaufbeuren	43	8	2508:23	98	2.34	1271	1173	92.29%
Marcel Melichercik	Heilbronner Falken	26	1	1528:50	70	2.75	877	807	92.02%
Jonas Langmann	Ravensburg Towerstars	46	1	2765:19	138	2.99	1664	1526	91.71%
Mirko Pantkowski	EC Kassel Huskies	24	1	1349:59	62	2.76	736	674	91.58%
Miroslav Hanuljak	EHC Freiburg	44	2	2627:10	135	3.08	1590	1455	91.51%
Hannibal Weitzmann	Löwen Frankfurt	20	0	1030:01	49	2.85	576	527	91.49%
Ilya Sharipov	Bietigheim Steelers	30	2	1816:24	79	2.61	926	847	91.47%
Olivier Roy	ETC Crimmitschau	21	0	1192:30	62	3.12	727	665	91.47%
Markus Keller	EC Kassel Huskies	32	1	1779:49	88	2.97	1024	936	91.41%
Marco Eisenhut	Dresdner Eislöwen	42	1	2435:11	122	3.01	1416	1294	91.38%
Tomas Vosvrda	Bayreuth Tigers	41	1	2384:17	138	3.47	1571	1433	91.22%

Note: To qualify for this list, goaltenders need to have played a minimum of 20 matches

== Playoffs ==
=== Championship ===
The championship play-offs:

The qualifiers for the playoffs ran between 6 March 2018 to 9 March 2018. Four teams (7v10 and 8v9) competed in best of three series’. The two winning teams advanced to the championship playoffs. In 2018, the two lower ranked teams in the qualifiers, ETC Crimmitschau and Heilbronner Falken, won their series and advanced to the playoffs. Dresdner Eislöwen and Ravensburg Towerstars were knocked out and their season ended.

The championship playoffs ran between 13 March 2018 to 22 April 2018. Eight teams competed in best of seven series'. The series winning teams advanced through from the quarter-finals to the final. In 2018, the top two seeds SC Riessersee and Bietigheim Steelers each won their quarter and semi-finals to reach the final. The Steelers defeated the league premiers 4-1 in the finals series to secure the division 2 championship title, their second DEL2 championship trophy.

First round
8	Dresdner Eislöwen	0
9	Heilbronner Falken	2
7	Ravensburg Towerstars	0
10	ETC Crimmitschau	2

Quarterfinals
1	SC Riessersee	4
8	ETC Crimmitschau	3
3	ESV Kaufbeuren	4
6	EC Bad Nauheim	1
2	Bietigheim Steelers	4
7	Heilbronner Falken	1
4	Löwen Frankfurt	4
5	EC Kassel Huskies	2

Semifinals
1	SC Riessersee	4
4	ESV Kaufbeuren	2
(Pairings are re-seeded after the first and second round)
2	Bietigheim Steelers	4
3	Löwen Frankfurt	2

Finals
1	SC Riessersee	1
2	Bietigheim Steelers	4

Note: All numbers represent series results, not a match score

=== Relegation ===
The relegation play-offs:

The relegation playoffs is contested between the four teams who finish bottom of the regular season standings. Run between 13 March 2018 and 6 April 2018, the four teams play best of seven series’. The teams that lose their first round advance to the second round. The winners secure their DEL2 status and avoid relegation. Whoever loses the second round is relegated to Oberliga. The 2018 edition would have seen Bayreuth Tigers relegated to Oberliga after losing their first round series 3-4 against Lausitzer Füchse before losing in five matches against Tölzer Löwen in the second round. However the Tigers were saved from relegation due to SC Riessersee not being granted a DEL2 licence in the summer of 2018. Instead, Riessersee was subsequently relegated to Oberliga.

Semifinals
11	Lausitzer Füchse	4
14	Bayreuth Tigers	3
12	EHC Freiburg	4
13	Tölzer Löwen	3

Finals
13	Tölzer Löwen	4
14	Bayreuth Tigers	1

Note: All numbers represent series results, not a match score
