= Tomáš Vošvrda =

Czech ice hockey player

- Born: 12 September 1989 (age 36) Ostrava, Czechoslovakia
- Height: 6 ft 4 in (193 cm)
- Weight: 229 lb (104 kg; 16 st 5 lb)
- Position: Goaltender
- Catches: Left
- Erste Liga team Former teams: DVTK Jegesmedvék; HC Vítkovice; Medicine Hat Tigers; HC Poruba; HC Slezan Opava; HC Havířov; Mountfield HK; HC Bílí Tygři Liberec; HC Benátky nad Jizerou; HC Olomouc; Bayreuth Tigers; HK Poprad; MHk 32 Liptovský Mikuláš; HK Dukla Michalovce
- NHL draft: Undrafted
- Playing career: 2009–present

Tomáš Vošvrda (born 12 September 1989 in Ostrava) is a Czech professional ice hockey goaltender who plays for DVTK Jegesmedvék of the Erste Liga.

Vošvrda previously played for HC Vítkovice, HC Havířov, Medicine Hat Tigers, HC Slezan Opava, HC Benátky nad Jizerou and Bílí Tygři Liberec.

== Career statistics ==
=== Regular season and playoffs ===
			Regular season									Playoffs
Season	Team	League	GP	W	L	OTL	MIN	GA	SO	GAA	SV%	GP	W	L	MIN	GA	SO	GAA	SV%
2005–06	HC Vítkovice	Czech-Jr.	5							2.62	.926	1					6.00	.818
2006–07	HC Vítkovice	Czech-Jr.	40							3.63	.897	6						3.47	.886
2007–08	Medicine Hat Tigers	WHL
2008–09	HC Vítkovice	Czech-Jr.
2008–09	HC Poruba	Czech.1										—	—	—	—	—	—	—	—
2008–09	HC Slezan Opava	Czech.2										—	—	—	—	—	—	—	—
2009–10	HC Vítkovice	Czech-Jr.
2009–10	HC Vítkovice	Czech										—	—	—	—	—	—	—	—
2009–10	HC Havířov	Czech.1										—	—	—	—	—	—	—	—
2009–10	HC VCES Hradec Králové	Czech.1
2010–11	HC Bílí Tygři Liberec	Czech
2010–11	HC Benátky nad Jizerou	Czech.1
2011–12	HC Bílí Tygři Liberec	Czech
2011–12	HC Benátky nad Jizerou	Czech.1
2012–13	HC Bílí Tygři Liberec	Czech
2012–13	HC Benátky nad Jizerou	Czech.1
2013–14	HC Olomouc	Czech.1
2014–15	HC Olomouc	Czech
2015–16	HC Olomouc	Czech
2015–16	AZ Havířov	Czech.1										—	—	—	—	—	—	—	—
2016–17	EHC Bayreuth	DEL2	41
2017–18	Bayreuth Tigers	DEL2	41
2018–19	HK Poprad	Slovak	38	25	11	2	2,225	90	5	2.43	.931	12	6	6	700	28	1	2.41	.935
2019–20	HK Poprad	Slovak	44	26	13	5	2,641	97	6	2.20	.925	—	—	—	—	—	—	—	—
2020–21	HK Poprad	Slovak	41	26	12	3	2,409	105	2	2.61	.908	13	9	4	772	30	0	2.56	.915
2021–22	MHk 32 Liptovský Mikuláš	Slovak	25	7	16	2	1,425	78	2			—	—	—	—	—	—	—	—
2021–22	HK Dukla Michalovce	Slovak
Slovak totals			148	84	52	12		370	15			25	15	10		58	1

=== International ===
Year	Team	Event	GP	W	L	T	MIN	GA	SO	GAA	SV%
2009	Czech Republic	WJC	2	0	2	0			0	4.98	.886
Junior totals			2	0	2	0			0	4.98	.886
