= Matt McKnight =

Canadian ice hockey player (born 1984)

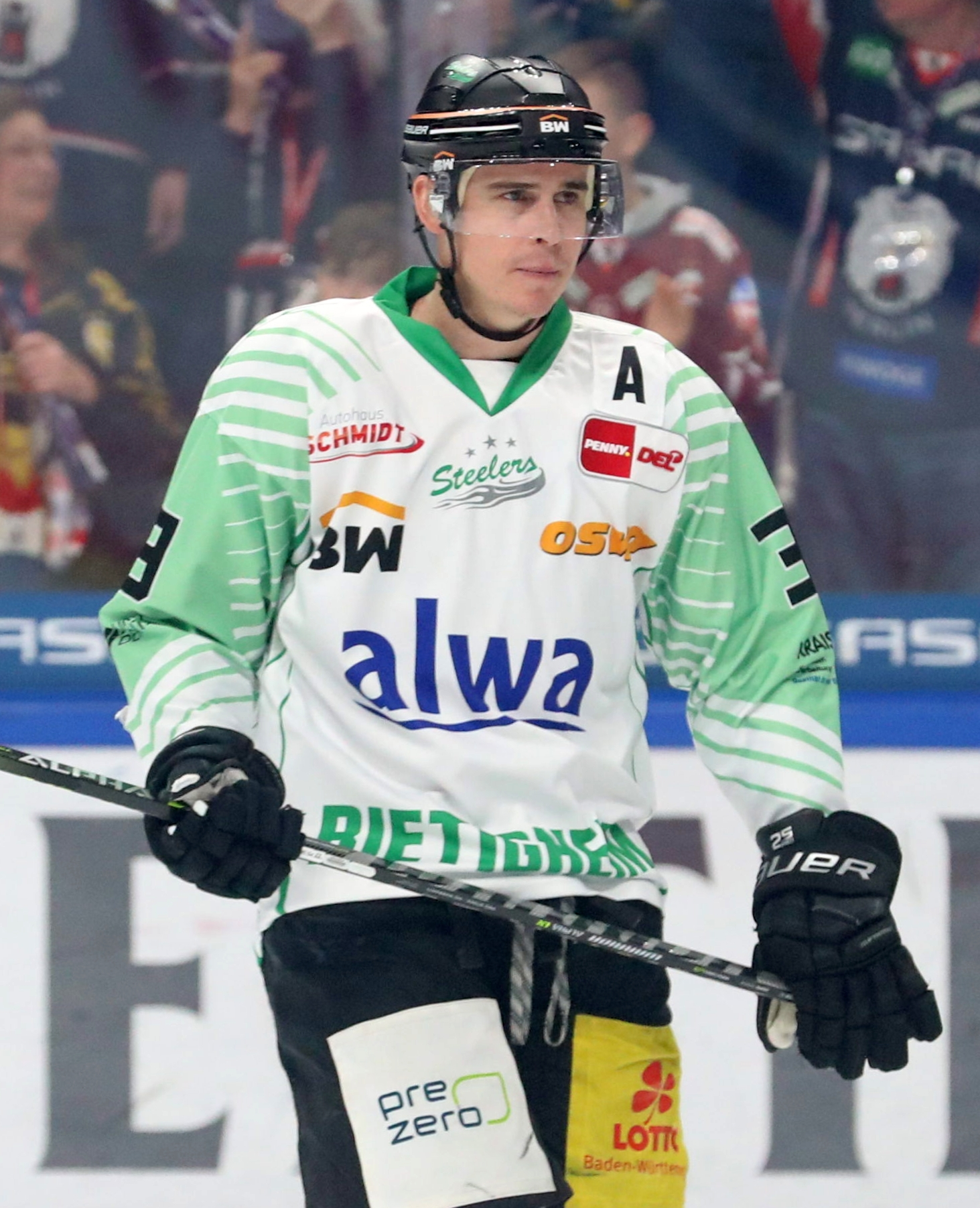
- Born: June 14, 1984 (age 41) Halkirk, Alberta, Canada
- Height: 6 ft 1 in (185 cm)
- Weight: 190 lb (86 kg; 13 st 8 lb)
- Position: Centre
- Shot: Right
- DEL team Former teams: Bietigheim Steelers; Las Vegas Wranglers; Idaho Steelheads; Lausitzer Füchse
- NHL draft: 280th overall, 2004; Dallas Stars
- Playing career: 2008–2022

Matt McKnight (born June 14, 1984) is a Canadian former professional ice hockey player. He was selected by the Dallas Stars in the 9th round (280th overall) of the 2004 NHL entry draft.

McKnight is currently playing for the Bietigheim Steelers in the DEL in Germany. He previously played for the Lausitzer Füchse in the German 2nd Bundesliga from 2011 to 2013. He received 2016-17 DEL2 Regular Season Forward of the Year honours after leading the league in points (24 goals, 48 assists in 50 games).

In the 2020/2021 season of the DEL2 he was promoted to the DEL with the Bietigheim Steelers after the DEL2 championship and at the age of 37 he played for the first time in the highest German ice hockey league, the DEL.

== Career statistics ==
			Regular season					Playoffs
Season	Team	League	GP	G	A	Pts	PIM	GP	G	A	Pts	PIM
2000–01	Red Deer Chiefs AAA	AMHL	36	11	8	19	28	—	—	—	—	—
2001–02	Red Deer Chiefs AAA	AMHL	36	33	26	59	26	—	—	—	—	—
2002–03	Camrose Kodiaks	AJHL	56	16	31	47	12	—	—	—	—	—
2003–04	Camrose Kodiaks	AJHL	42	20	36	56	31	—	—	—	—	—
2004–05	University of Minnesota Duluth	WCHA	30	6	13	19	16	—	—	—	—	—
2005–06	University of Minnesota Duluth	WCHA	40	9	16	25	24	—	—	—	—	—
2006–07	University of Minnesota Duluth	WCHA	29	4	5	9	16	—	—	—	—	—
2007–08	University of Minnesota Duluth	WCHA	33	6	10	16	24	—	—	—	—	—
2008–09	Las Vegas Wranglers	ECHL	4	0	1	1	4	—	—	—	—	—
2008–09	Idaho Steelheads	ECHL	62	10	23	33	44	4	1	0	1	0
2009–10	Idaho Steelheads	ECHL	48	13	18	31	16	9	5	2	7	6
2010–11	Idaho Steelheads	ECHL	16	3	6	9	6	—	—	—	—	—
2011–12	Lausitzer Füchse	GER.2	45	16	28	44	32	5	1	7	8	6
2012–13	Lausitzer Füchse	GER.2	40	15	40	55	28	5	3	5	8	16
2013–14	Bietigheim Steelers	DEL2	46	20	32	52	18	16	5	15	20	8
2014–15	Bietigheim Steelers	DEL2	51	21	56	77	14	4	0	4	4	0
2015–16	Bietigheim Steelers	DEL2	34	8	24	32	12	14	1	9	10	8
2016–17	Bietigheim Steelers	DEL2	51	24	48	72	20	15	9	13	22	10
2017–18	Bietigheim Steelers	DEL2	52	34	44	78	16	13	2	13	15	10
2018–19	Bietigheim Steelers	DEL2	51	26	53	79	28	7	3	8	11	8
2019–20	Bietigheim Steelers	DEL2	50	16	34	50	22	2	2	2	4	2
2020–21	Bietigheim Steelers	DEL2	47	24	32	56	6	13	1	15	16	27
2021–22	Bietigheim Steelers	DEL	55	9	13	22	4	—	—	—	—	—
ECHL totals			130	26	48	74	70	13	6	2	8	6
DEL2 totals			382	173	323	496	136	84	23	79	102	73
