= Springside, Saskatchewan =

Town in Saskatchewan, Canada

Town of Springside
- Town
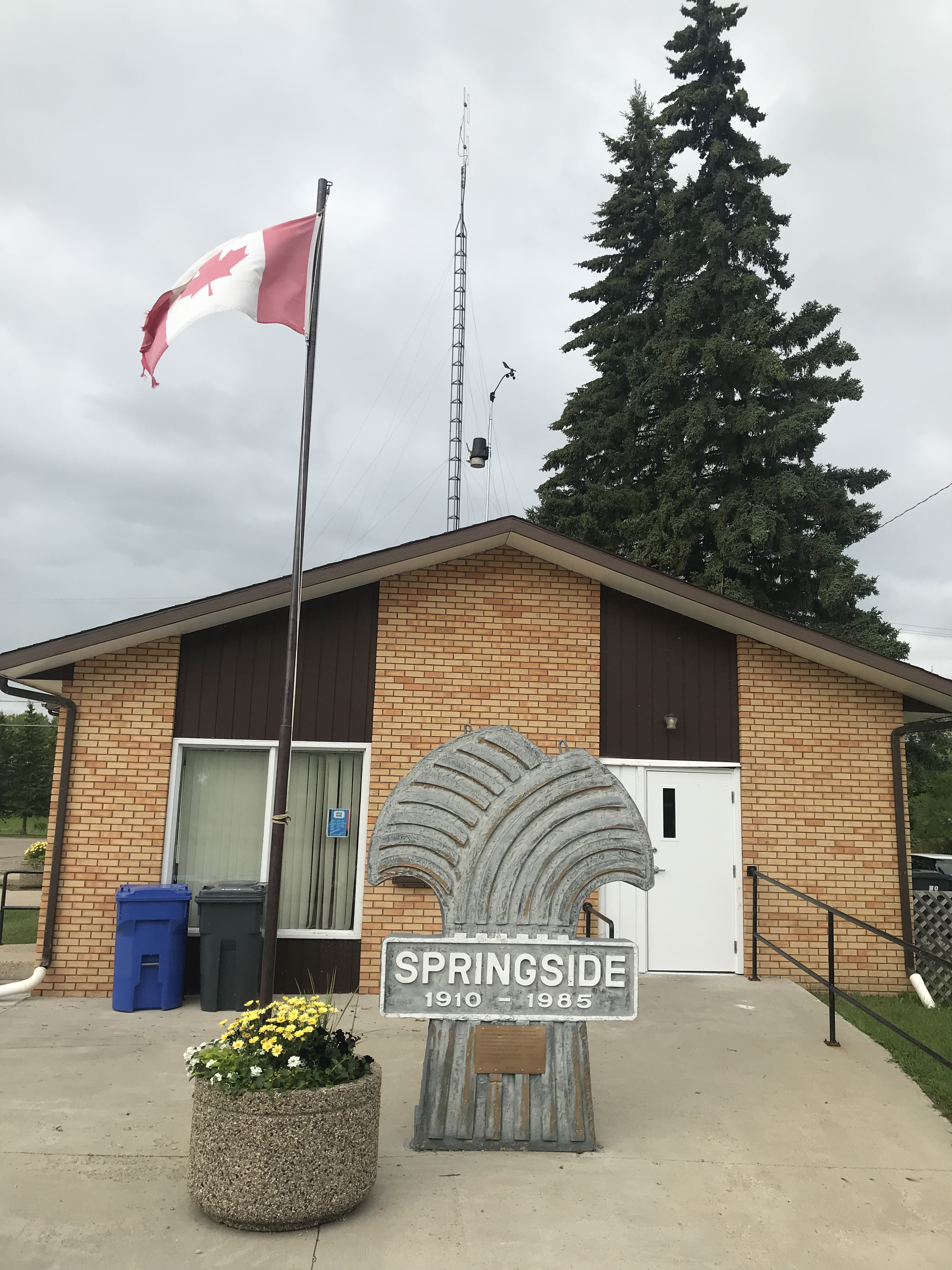

- Location within Saskatchewan Location within Canada
- Coordinates: 51°20′41″N 102°44′32″W
- Country: Canada
- Province: Saskatchewan
- Census division: No. 9
- Rural Municipality: Orkney No. 244
- Post office founded: N/A
- Incorporated (Village): N/A
- Incorporated (Town): N/A

Government
  - Mayor: Debbie Banks
  - Acting administrator: Kathy Novak
  - Governing body: Springside Town Council

Area
  - Total: 0.64 km^{2} (0.25 sq mi)

Population (2001)
  - Total: 525
  - Density: 825.9/km^{2} (2,139/sq mi)
- Time zone: CST
- Postal code: S0A 3V0
- Area code: 306
- Highways: Highway 47; Highway 16
- Website: https://townofspringside.ca/

Springside is a town in Saskatchewan, Canada, in the Rural Municipality of Orkney No. 244. It is about 24 kilometres (15 mi) northwest of the city of Yorkton along the Yellowhead Highway.

== Demographics ==
In the 2021 Census of Population conducted by Statistics Canada, Springside had a population of 478 living in 202 of its 227 total private dwellings, a change of −4.8% from its 2016 population of 502. With a land area of 0.7 km^{2} (0.27 sq mi), it had a population density of 682.9/km^{2} (1,768.6/sq mi) in 2021.

== Gallery ==
Cenotaph in Springside

School in Springside

Historical plaque in Springside

== Transportation ==
Originally located along the old Dakota Trail, Springside today is serviced by the Canadian Pacific Railway as well as Highway 47 and Highway 16 (Yellowhead Highway.)

== Notable people ==
- Clarke Breitkreuz (born 1991), ice hockey player
- Brett Breitkreuz (born 1989), ice hockey player

== See also ==
- List of communities in Saskatchewan
- List of towns in Saskatchewan
