= Tim Breitkreuz =

German politician (born 1994)

Member of the Landtag of Baden-Württemberg
- Incumbent
- Assumed office 11 May 2026
- Constituency: Hohenlohe

Personal details
- Born: 30 July 1994 (age 32)
- Party: Christian Democratic Union

Tim Breitkreuz (born 30 July 1994) is a German politician who was elected member of the Landtag of Baden-Württemberg in 2026. He has served as chairman of the Christian Democratic Union in Schwäbisch Hall since 2023.
