= Christoph Breitkreuz =

German geologist

- Born: 16 December 1955 (age 70); Germany
- Occupations: Geologist, academic, and an author
- Title: Emeritus Professor

Academic background
- Education: Diplom MSc., Geology, 1980; PhD, 1982
- Alma mater: Technische Universität Berlin

Christoph Breitkreuz is a German geologist, academic, and author. He is an Emeritus Professor of Geology at the Freiberg University of Mining and Technology. His major contributions and research work are in the area of sedimentology, volcanology, geotectonics, and magmatic petrology. He has co-authored two undergraduate textbooks, titled Grundlagen der Geologie and Entwicklung des Systems Erde. and co-edited a science textbook, titled Physical geology of shallow magmatic systems.

Breitkreuz co-founded the Centre for Volcanic Textures (CVT) in 2001 at TU Bergakademie Freiberg. He also founded a series of workshops on Physical Geology, called LASI (Laccoliths and Sills).

== Education ==
Breitreuz was born in Berlin on 16 December 1955. He enrolled in the Diploma (MSc.) Geology Program at Technische Universität Berlin. Following his Diploma, he undertook research in petrology and geochemistry for a PhD at Technische Universität Berlin in 1982. He then proceeded with a postdoctoral degree: Habilitation in 1986 in Paleozoic volcano-sedimentary successions in North Chile and the regional geology of the Central Andes.

== Career ==
Following his Diplom, Breitkreuz started his academic career as a Research Associate at Institute for Geology and Paleontology of Technische Universität Berlin between 1980 and 1990. In 1989, he also concurrently got appointed as a Lecturer at Geologisches Institut. Following this appointment, he simultaneously took the role of Lecturer at Geologisch-Paläontologisches Institut of the Ruprecht Karl University of Heidelberg. Between 1992 and 1994, he was awarded a research grant (German Research Foundation, DFG) at the Department of Geology at the University of Kansas. Consequently, he was appointed as a Heisenberg Research Fellow between 1995 and 2000 at the GFZ German Research Centre for Geosciences. He held an appointment as a professor at the Free University of Berlin for a year and became Full Professor at Freiberg University of Mining and Technology in 2000.

During his tenure at Freiberg University of Mining and Technology, he served as Vice Rector for External Relations from 2006 till 2010 and as the Head of Geology Department between 2015 and 2021.

== Research ==
Breitkreuz has 140 publications to his name. He is recognized for his research in the fields of volcanology, sedimentology, physical geology, alteration of Volcanic rocks and volcanogenic sediments, and textures of subvolcanic systems. His research has implications in the areas of volcanic textures, basin evolution, magmatic petrology, geotectonic, and regional geology of Europe, North Africa and South America.

=== Volcanology ===
Breitkreuz's research is significant as to the plutonic evolution in Northern Chile and the regional geology of Central Andes. In his research on the intrusive deformation in the case of the Flamenco pluton, it was indicated that the 25-km long Chañaral shear zones are dependent on the probability of inherited crystal anisotropies that cause the slip displacement He also focused his study on investigating zircon ages in zoned plutons through uranium–lead dating. His study on the zoned Flamenco Pluton presented an in-depth view into the emplacement process. One of his most recent works highlighted the geochemical characterization and physical volcanology of the igneous rocks in Germany.

=== Sedimentology ===
Breitkreuz's research work explores the volcano-sedimentary succession, clastic sedimentation, and magmatic evolution in the regions of Morocco, Egypt, and Sudan. He determined different emplacement connections in the geochemically similar magmatic batches. Breitkreuz co-determined the SHRIMP (Sensitive High-Resolution Ion Microprobe) zircon ages of 12 volcanic samples which indicated a magmatic flare-up in the North German basin. One of his significant contributions regarding volcano-sedimentary successions has been the determination of Neoproterozoic SHRIMP U–Pb zircon ages of NE Egypt. Based on the five samples of zircon corresponding to ages of 669, 715–746, 847, and 1530 Ma, his study on the chronology of the Dokhan Volcanics of NE Egypt supported the models affirmed the North Eastern Desert crust as the primary juvenile Neoproterozoic crust. He also characterized the Intracontinental extensional magmatism on Early Permian Halle Volcanic Complex. His study revealed an essential feature of magmatism, i.e., the same magmatism can present a different chemical expression based on the underlying structure of lithospheric blocks. That can consequently be used to map out the destroyed terrain boundaries in the ancient orogens. He also carried out research study focused on the volcano-sedimentary succession in Western Skoura Inlier in Morocco. The geochemical results and zircon dating yielded the ages that compared highly with the Anti-Atlas, High-Atlas, and rare with the Northern Meseta Domains.

== Bibliography ==
=== Books ===
- Elicki, O. & Breitkreuz, C.: Entwicklung des Systems Erde (2016) 978-3-662-47191-3
- Bahlburg, H. & Breitkreuz, C.: Grundlagen der Geologie (2018) 978-3-662-54931-5
- Breitkreuz, C. & Rocchi, S. (eds.): Physical Geology of Shallow Magmatic Systems – Dykes, Sills and Laccoliths

=== Selected articles ===
- Bahlburg, H.; Breitkreuz, C. (January 1991). "Paleozoic evolution of active margin basins in the southern Central Andes (northwestern Argentina and northern Chile)". Journal of South American Earth Sciences. 4 (3): 171–188. Bibcode:1991JSAES...4..171B. doi:10.1016/0895-9811(91)90029-K.
- Breitkreuz, Christoph; Kennedy, Allen (February 1999). "Magmatic flare-up at the Carboniferous/Permian boundary in the NE German Basin revealed by SHRIMP zircon ages". Tectonophysics. 302 (3–4): 307–326. Bibcode:1999Tectp.302..307B. doi:10.1016/S0040-1951(98)00293-5.
- Romer, Rolf L.; Förster, Hans-Jürgen; Breitkreuz, Christoph (May 2001). "Intracontinental extensional magmatism with a subduction fingerprint: the late Carboniferous Halle Volcanic Complex (Germany)". Contributions to Mineralogy and Petrology. 141 (2): 201–221. Bibcode:2001CoMP..141..201R. doi:10.1007/s004100000231.
- Breitkreuz, Christoph; Eliwa, Hassan; Khalaf, Ibrahim; Gameel, Khaled El; Bühler, Benjamin; Sergeev, Sergei; Larionov, Alexander; Murata, Mamoru (October 2010). "Neoproterozoic SHRIMP U–Pb zircon ages of silica-rich Dokhan Volcanics in the North Eastern Desert, Egypt". Precambrian Research. 182 (3): 163–174. Bibcode:2010PreR..182..163B. doi:10.1016/j.precamres.2010.06.019.
- Breitkreuz, Christoph (April 2013). "Spherulites and lithophysae—200 years of investigation on high-temperature crystallization domains in silica-rich volcanic rocks". Bulletin of Volcanology. 75 (4) 705. Bibcode:2013BVol...75..705B. doi:10.1007/s00445-013-0705-6.
