= 2018–19 DEL2 season =

- League: DEL2
- Sport: Ice Hockey
- Duration: 14 September 2018 – 28 April 2019
- Games: 364 (52 per team)
- Teams: 14
- TV partner(s): Sprade TV eoTV

Regular season
- Season champions: Löwen Frankfurt
- Season MVP: Matt McKnight (Steelers)
- Top scorer: Roope Ranta (Falken)
- Relegated to Oberliga: Deggendorfer SC

Playoffs
- Champions: Ravensburg Towerstars
- Runners-up: Löwen Frankfurt
- Finals MVP: Jonas Langmann (Towerstars)

DEL2 seasons
- ← 2017–18 2019–20 →

The 2018–19 DEL2 season was the sixth season since the founding of the DEL2, the second tier of German ice hockey, set below the Deutsche Eishockey Liga. The season ran from 14 September 2018 till 28 April 2019. Löwen Frankfurt was crowned league premiers by finishing top of the regular season standings. Ravensburg Towerstars caused an upset by claiming the championship title by defeating Löwen Frankfurt 4–2 in the final series. Promoted team, Deggendorfer SC, was unable to survive in DEL2 and was relegated after losing the relegation playoffs final 3–4 against Wölfe Freiburg.

== Modus ==
Fourteen teams competed in the 2018–19 DEL2 regular season. Deggendorfer SC was promoted from Germany's third division, Oberliga. Each team played each other twice in the regular season, home and away, for a total of 52 matches each. The top six teams directly qualified for the championship playoffs, played in a best of seven format. Teams placed seven to ten advanced to the championship playoff qualifiers, which follow a best of three format. The bottom four teams enter the relegation playoffs. The two losing teams from round 1 face off in the relegation final with the losing team being relegated to Oberliga.

The DEL2 champion does not automatically get promoted to DEL. In September 2015, the DEL and DEL2 agreed to reintroduce promotion and relegation between the two leagues from the 2017–18 season onwards. The DEL2 champion would then have the opportunity to be promoted, provided it fulfilled the licensing requirements of the DEL, while the last-placed DEL club would be relegated. In 2018, the two leagues signed a new agreement to reintroduce an automatic promotion and relegation system to start in 2020–21.

== Regular season ==
=== Results ===
The cross table represents the results of all matches of the regular season. The home team is listed in the middle column, the visiting team in the top row.

| First round | | | | | | | | | | | | | | Team | Second round | | | | | | | | | | | | | |
| SCB | FRA | ESV | ECN | ECK | RVT | DRE | HNF | EPC | LFX | FRB | ECT | BTT | DSC | Team | SCB | FRA | ESV | ECN | ECK | RVT | DRE | HNF | EPC | LFX | FRB | ECT | BTT | DSC |
| | 2:4 | 4:2 | 5:3 | 3:8 | 4:5^{S} | 3:4^{O} | 6:1 | 6:3 | 2:5 | 2:4 | 6:3 | 2:3^{O} | 4:2 | SCB | | 4:3^{O} | 3:5 | 3:0 | 3:0 | 4:1 | 6:3 | 4:3^{O} | 6:7^{O} | 5:1 | 5:1 | 5:0 | 6:3 | 4:5^{O} |
| 2:3 | | 5:2 | 3:4 | 5:2 | 4:7 | 3:1 | 5:3 | 4:3 | 5:4^{O} | 5:0 | 9:2 | 10:4 | 1:4 | FRA | 5:4^{O} | | 3:2^{O} | 3:4^{O} | 1:2 | 8:1 | 6:1 | 6:2 | 9:1 | 5:1 | 4:1 | 4:3 | 3:4 | 5:4 |
| 3:4^{O} | 4:3 | | 7:3 | 2:1^{O} | 1:4 | 1:4 | 7:2 | 6:2 | 4:6 | 1:0 | 7:1 | 3:2^{O} | 9:2 | ESV | 4:3 | 6:3 | | 4:3 | 2:1 | 3:2 | 3:5 | 1:5 | 9:1 | 2:5 | 3:4 | 3:4^{O} | 3:4 | 6:3 |
| 5:3 | 3:4^{O} | 3:5 | | 3:4 | 7:5 | 5:4 | 3:4^{S} | 5:0 | 2:3^{O} | 2:5 | 4:2 | 5:1 | 5:2 | ECN | 3:5 | 5:4^{S} | 0:3 | | 1:0 | 6:3 | 6:2 | 9:5 | 6:3 | 5:3 | 4:0 | 6:2 | 3:2 | 5:1 |
| 1:6 | 0:4 | 0:1 | 2:3 | | 2:6 | 0:2 | 4:2 | 1:2 | 5:2 | 1:2^{S} | 6:2 | 4:5^{O} | 6:2 | ECK | 4:2 | 4:1 | 2:3 | 3:6 | | 5:2 | 6:2 | 5:4^{O} | 4:8 | 3:2 | 5:2 | 5:1 | 6:1 | 3:1 |
| 8:5 | 1:2 | 4:3 | 4:2 | 3:5 | | 8:1 | 3:2^{O} | 7:2 | 9:2 | 5:2 | 5:4^{O} | 7:1 | 5:1 | RVT | 2:4 | 3:1 | 6:1 | 5:4^{O} | 3:1 | | 2:3^{O} | 5:3 | 5:6^{O} | 3:4^{O} | 3:0 | 3:4 | 2:3 | 4:3^{O} |
| 6:5 | 2:5 | 2:1 | 3:1 | 2:5 | 4:0 | | 3:6 | 3:4 | 1:2^{O} | 6:3 | 3:1 | 3:4^{O} | 4:1 | DRE | 2:5 | 6:3 | 6:3 | 4:2 | 6:1 | 3:2 | | 2:6 | 3:2^{O} | 3:4^{S} | 3:6 | 6:2 | 5:4 | 3:2 |
| 3:5 | 4:3^{O} | 2:3 | 3:2 | 2:4 | 2:5 | 5:2 | | 3:2 | 7:6^{O} | 7:6^{O} | 3:2^{O} | 3:2 | 5:7 | HNF | 4:3^{S} | 3:6 | 3:4 | 8:3 | 3:1 | 3:4^{S} | 3:4^{O} | | 7:4 | 5:4 | 3:0 | 2:1 | 6:1 | 9:1 |
| 3:2 | 2:3^{S} | 2:3 | 6:3 | 5:2 | 3:5 | 11:4 | 2:5 | | 1:4 | 4:2 | 6:3 | 1:6 | 3:4 | EPC | 4:7 | 4:5^{S} | 2:1 | 3:4 | 1:5 | 4:1 | 6:1 | 6:3 | | 4:3 | 5:4 | 6:3 | 2:6 | 6:3 |
| 0:3 | 2:6 | 2:4 | 3:2 | 4:1 | 5:4 | 1:0 | 8:5 | 5:4 | | 5:4^{O} | 2:3^{O} | 1:2^{S} | 4:2 | LFX | 3:2 | 1:2^{S} | 6:3 | 2:4 | 2:0 | 4:0 | 6:2 | 3:2 | 3:4 | | 4:1 | 7:0 | 1:2^{O} | 4:1 |
| 2:4 | 3:1 | 0:1^{O} | 4:0 | 0:1 | 2:3 | 5:4 | 4:6 | 5:2 | 3:2 | | 3:6 | 5:3 | 1:3 | FRB | 2:0 | 4:6 | 4:1 | 0:2 | 1:2^{S} | 2:3 | 3:4^{O} | 2:5 | 4:1 | 1:2 | | 3:1 | 4:2 | 6:1 |
| 3:4^{O} | 6:2 | 2:4 | 3:4^{S} | 4:3 | 3:7 | 3:2 | 7:4 | 0:3 | 1:4 | 5:0 | | 5:2 | 5:1 | ECT | 4:7 | 4:3^{S} | 1:2 | 2:1^{S} | 2:3^{O} | 1:4 | 4:3 | 2:1 | 3:2^{S} | 4:3^{O} | 7:3 | | 5:6 | 3:2 |
| 2:3 | 1:2 | 5:6^{O} | 2:3 | 3:1 | 4:5 | 4:1 | 4:5 | 0:5 | 4:6 | 4:2 | 4:2 | | 0:7 | BTT | 4:3 | 5:2 | 4:2 | 4:7 | 4:1 | 5:3 | 3:5 | 6:3 | 5:2 | 2:4 | 4:3 | 3:2^{O} | | 6:7 |
| 1:9 | 1:5 | 1:4 | 2:5 | 4:2 | 3:5 | 3:5 | 7:5 | 6:5^{O} | 2:4 | 5:4^{S} | 3:5 | 7:5 | | DSC | 2:0 | 4:5 | 4:5 | 2:1^{O} | 2:3 | 2:7 | 5:2 | 7:4 | 5:6^{S} | 4:0 | 3:2^{S} | 2:4 | 2:0 | |

Note: ^{O} Overtime; ^{S} Shootout

=== Standings ===
| Pos | Team | GP | W | OTW | SOW | OTL | SOL | L | PTS | GF | GA | GD | PIM | HF | AF |
|---|---|---|---|---|---|---|---|---|---|---|---|---|---|---|---|
| 1. | Löwen Frankfurt (P) | 52 | 26 | 4 | 3 | 3 | 2 | 14 | 97 | 211 | 153 | +58 | 699 | 16-3-1-6 | 10-4-4-8 |
| 2. | Bietigheim Steelers | 52 | 26 | 4 | 0 | 5 | 2 | 15 | 93 | 208 | 161 | +47 | 601 | 14-2-5-5 | 12-2-2-10 |
| 3. | Ravensburg Towerstars (C) | 52 | 26 | 4 | 2 | 3 | 0 | 17 | 93 | 209 | 163 | +46 | 680 | 14-4-3-5 | 12-2-0-12 |
| 4. | ESV Kaufbeuren | 52 | 27 | 4 | 0 | 3 | 0 | 18 | 92 | 178 | 153 | +25 | 599 | 14-2-2-8 | 13-2-1-10 |
| 5. | Lausitzer Füchse | 52 | 25 | 4 | 1 | 5 | 2 | 15 | 92 | 174 | 155 | +19 | 568 | 16-1-4-5 | 9-4-3-10 |
| 6. | EC Bad Nauheim | 52 | 26 | 1 | 2 | 4 | 2 | 17 | 90 | 187 | 165 | +22 | 663 | 17-1-3-5 | 9-2-3-12 |
| 7. | EC Kassel Huskies | 52 | 22 | 2 | 1 | 2 | 1 | 24 | 75 | 146 | 145 | +1 | 577 | 13-1-2-10 | 9-2-1-14 |
| 8. | Heilbronner Falken | 52 | 19 | 4 | 2 | 4 | 1 | 22 | 74 | 204 | 206 | -2 | 789 | 12-5-2-7 | 7-1-3-15 |
| 9. | Dresdner Eislöwen | 52 | 20 | 5 | 0 | 2 | 1 | 24 | 73 | 165 | 191 | -26 | 618 | 15-1-3-7 | 5-4-0-17 |
| 10. | Eispiraten Crimmitschau | 52 | 20 | 2 | 1 | 2 | 3 | 24 | 71 | 186 | 212 | -26 | 634 | 14-0-2-10 | 6-3-3-14 |
| 11. | Bayreuth Tigers | 52 | 18 | 5 | 1 | 2 | 0 | 26 | 68 | 170 | 196 | -26 | 556 | 12-1-1-12 | 6-5-1-14 |
| 12. | Tölzer Löwen | 52 | 15 | 3 | 3 | 5 | 1 | 25 | 63 | 152 | 196 | -44 | 750 | 11-4-3-8 | 4-2-3-17 |
| 13. | EHC Freiburg | 52 | 16 | 0 | 1 | 4 | 3 | 28 | 57 | 134 | 171 | -37 | 500 | 12-0-3-11 | 4-1-4-17 |
| 14. | Deggendorfer SC (R) | 52 | 14 | 3 | 2 | 1 | 1 | 31 | 54 | 161 | 218 | -37 | 704 | 8-4-1-13 | 6-1-1-18 |

| Championship playoffs | Championship playoff qualifiers | Relegation playoffs |

Points rules: 3 points for regulation win; 2 points for OT or SO win; 1 point for OT or SO loss; 0 points for regulation loss
Tie-break rules: 1) points; 2) head-to-head points; 3) head-to-head goal difference; 4) head-to-head number of goals scored.
(C) Champions; (P) Premiers; (R) Relegated

=== Top scorers ===
| Name | Team | GP | G | A | PTS | PIM | +/− |
|---|---|---|---|---|---|---|---|
| Roope Ranta | Heilbronner Falken | 51 | 31 | 48 | 79 | 65 | +2 |
| Matt McKnight | Bietigheim Steelers | 51 | 26 | 53 | 79 | 28 | −1 |
| Dustin Sylvester | EC Bad Nauheim | 52 | 26 | 45 | 71 | 78 | −1 |
| Jordan Knackstedt | Dresdner Eislöwen | 51 | 21 | 50 | 71 | 119 | +3 |
| Sami Blomqvist | ESV Kaufbeuren | 50 | 39 | 31 | 70 | 32 | +11 |
| Adam Mitchell | Löwen Frankfurt | 51 | 23 | 47 | 70 | 50 | +11 |
| Greg Gibson | Heilbronner Falken | 51 | 35 | 31 | 66 | 44 | +12 |
| Derek Damon | Heilbronner Falken | 52 | 18 | 45 | 63 | 68 | +3 |
| Rob Flick | Eispiraten Crimmitschau | 52 | 34 | 27 | 61 | 98 | −5 |
| Norman Hauner | Bietigheim Steelers | 51 | 32 | 29 | 61 | 26 | +7 |
| Stephen MacAulay | Tölzer Löwen | 51 | 25 | 36 | 61 | 48 | −9 |

=== Top goaltenders ===
| Name | Team | GP | SO | MP | GA | GAA | SH | SV | SV% |
|---|---|---|---|---|---|---|---|---|---|
| Leon Hungerecker | EC Kassel Huskies | 23 | 0 | 1251:47 | 54 | 2.59 | 720 | 666 | 92.50% |
| Marcel Melichercik | EC Kassel Huskies | 27 | 1 | 1503:33 | 74 | 2.95 | 925 | 851 | 92.00% |
| Jonas Langmann | Ravensburg Towerstars | 45 | 1 | 2652:49 | 130 | 2.94 | 1523 | 1393 | 91.46% |
| Jimmy Hertel | EHC Freiburg | 21 | 1 | 1138:00 | 54 | 2.85 | 617 | 563 | 91.25% |
| Olafr Schmidt | Lausitzer Füchse | 31 | 3 | 1683:33 | 71 | 2.53 | 809 | 738 | 91.22% |
| Matthias Nemec | EHC Freiburg | 34 | 1 | 1954:36 | 103 | 3.16 | 1153 | 1050 | 91.07% |
| Felix Bick | Löwen Frankfurt | 38 | 3 | 2224:24 | 104 | 2.81 | 1159 | 1055 | 91.03% |
| Ilya Sharipov | Bietigheim Steelers | 26 | 2 | 1501:58 | 70 | 2.80 | 762 | 692 | 90.81% |
| Ilya Andryukhov | Löwen Frankfurt | 21 | 0 | 1197:54 | 51 | 2.55 | 551 | 500 | 90.74% |
| Mirko Pantkowski | Heilbronner Falken | 41 | 0 | 2343:12 | 134 | 3.43 | 1440 | 1306 | 90.69% |
| Ben Meisner | Tölzer Löwen | 43 | 1 | 2351:46 | 132 | 3.37 | 1381 | 1249 | 90.44% |

Note: To qualify for this list, goaltenders need to have played a minimum of 20 matches

== Playoffs ==
=== Championship ===
The championship play-offs:

The qualifiers for the playoffs ran between 8 March 2019 to 12 March 2019. Four teams (7v10 and 8v9) competed in best of three series’. The two winning teams advanced to the championship playoffs. In 2019, the two lower ranked teams in the qualifiers, Dresdner Eislöwen and ETC Crimmitschau, won their series and advanced to the playoffs. Kassel Huskies and Heilbronner Falken were knocked out and their season ended.

The championship playoffs ran between 15 March 2019 to 28 April 2019. Eight teams competed in best of seven series'. The series winning teams advanced through from the quarter-finals to the final. In 2019, the top seed Löwen Frankfurt dominated their quarter and semi-finals to reach the final. However, they lost the final series 4–2 to third seed Ravensburg Towerstars. The Towerstars claimed their second division 2 championship and their first DEL2 championship trophy.

First round
8 | Heilbronner Falken | 1
9 | Dresdner Eislöwen | 2
7 | EC Kassel Huskies | 1
10 | ETC Crimmitschau | 2

Quarterfinals
1 | Löwen Frankfurt | 4
8 | ETC Crimmitschau | 1
3 | Ravensburg | 4
6 | EC Bad Nauheim | 0
2 | Bietigheim Steelers | 3
7 | Dresdner Eislöwen | 4
4 | ESV Kaufbeuren | 4
5 | Lausitzer Füchse | 3

Semifinals
1 | Löwen Frankfurt | 4
7 | Dresdner Eislöwen | 0
(Pairings are re-seeded after the first and second round)
3 | Ravensburg | 4
4 | ESV Kaufbeuren | 1

Finals
1 | Löwen Frankfurt | 2
3 | Ravensburg | 4

Note: All numbers represent series results, not a match score

=== Relegation ===
The relegation play-offs:

The relegation playoffs is contested between the four teams who finish bottom of the regular season standings. Run between 15 March 2019 and 16 April 2019, the four teams play best of seven series’. The teams that lose their first round advance to the second round. The winners secure their DEL2 status and avoid relegation. Whoever loses the second round is relegated to Oberliga. The 2019 edition saw Deggendorfer SC relegated to Oberliga after losing their first round series 4–0 against Bayreuth Tigers before going to the wire but ultimately losing the seventh match against Wölfe Freiburg in the second round.

Semifinals
11 | Bayreuth Tigers | 4
14 | Deggendorfer SC | 0
12 | Tölzer Löwen | 4
13 | Wölfe Freiburg | 3

Finals
13 | Wölfe Freiburg | 4
14 | Deggendorfer SC | 3

Note: All numbers represent series results, not a match score
