= Clarke Breitkreuz =

Canadian-German ice hockey player

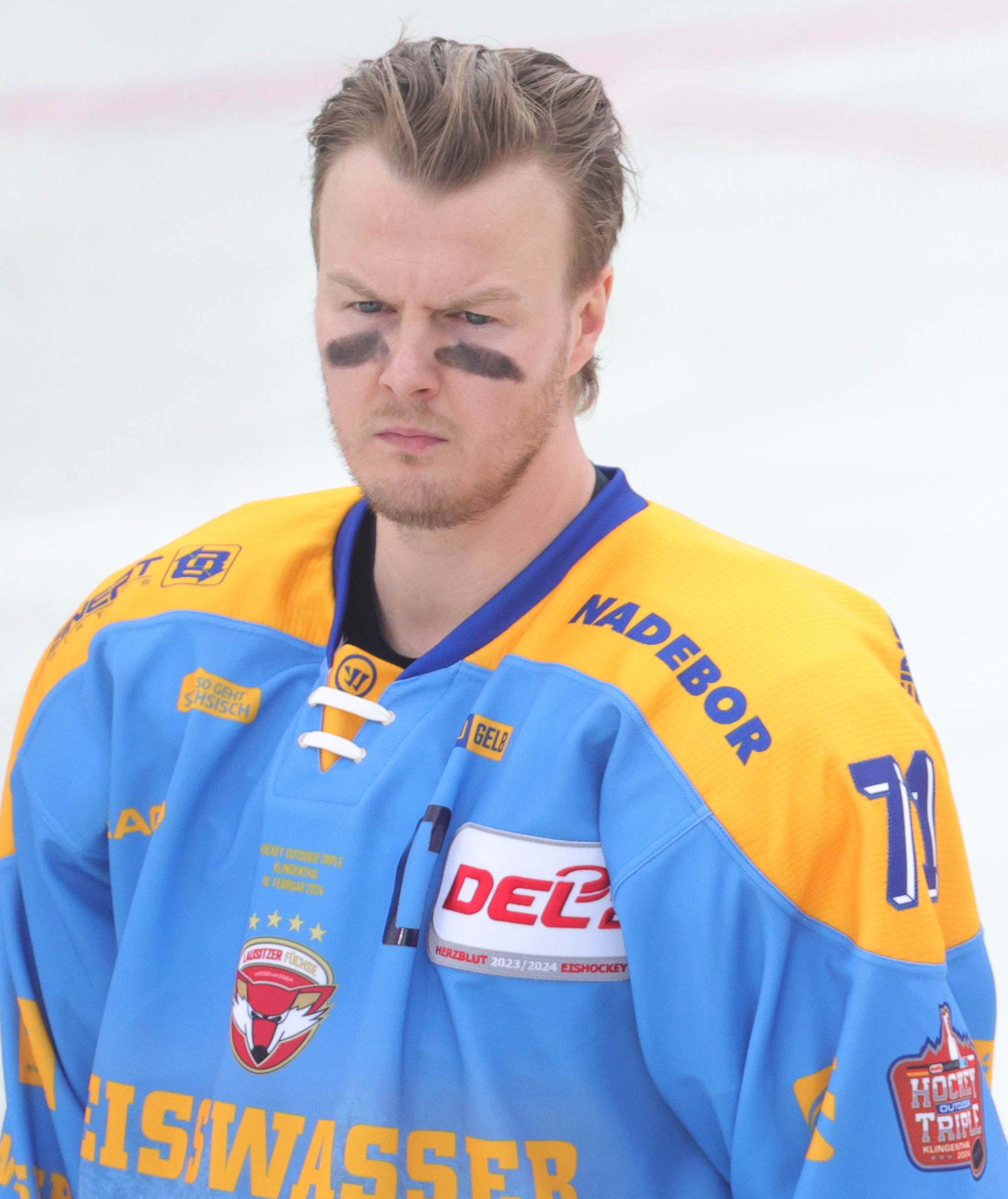
- Born: November 28, 1991 (age 34) Springside, Saskatchewan, Canada
- Height: 6 ft 0 in (183 cm)
- Weight: 183 lb (83 kg; 13 st 1 lb)
- Position: Right wing
- Shoots: Right
- DEL2 team Former teams: Lausitzer Füchse; Grizzly Adams Wolfsburg
- NHL draft: Undrafted
- Playing career: 2011–present

Clarke Breitkreuz (born November 28, 1991) is a Canadian-German professional ice hockey player. He is currently playing for German side Lausitzer Füchse in the second-tier DEL2.

== Playing career ==
Born in Springside, Saskatchewan, Breitkreuz played for the Beardy's Blackhawks of the SMHL in 2007–08, and then split the following season between WHL's Regina Pats and SJHL's Yorkton Terriers. Also the 2009–10 campaign saw him turn out for the Terriers, before joining the Prince George Cougars of the WHL.

For the 2010–11 season, Breitkreuz returned to the Yorkton Terriers for a third stint.

In 2011, he landed his first job overseas, signing with German third-division club Füchse Duisburg. In 2013, he signed with fellow third-division side Löwen Frankfurt and also was handed a license for the Grizzly Adams Wolfsburg of Germany's top-flight Deutsche Eishockey Liga (DEL). He made four DEL appearances for the Wolfsburg team throughout the 2013–14 season, while helping Frankfurt to promotion to the second-division DEL2.

In Frankfurt, Clarke plays alongside his brother Brett. He had his contract renewed for the 2015–16 season and also played for the Löwen squad in the 2016-17 campaign in which he helped the team win the DEL2 championship. He left Frankfurt at the end of the 2017–18 season and signed with fellow DEL2 side Lausitzer Füchse on June 1, 2018.

== Personal info ==
His grandparents moved from Germany to Canada. Clarke has dual citizenship in Canada and Germany.
