= Sami Blomqvist =

Finnish professional ice hockey player

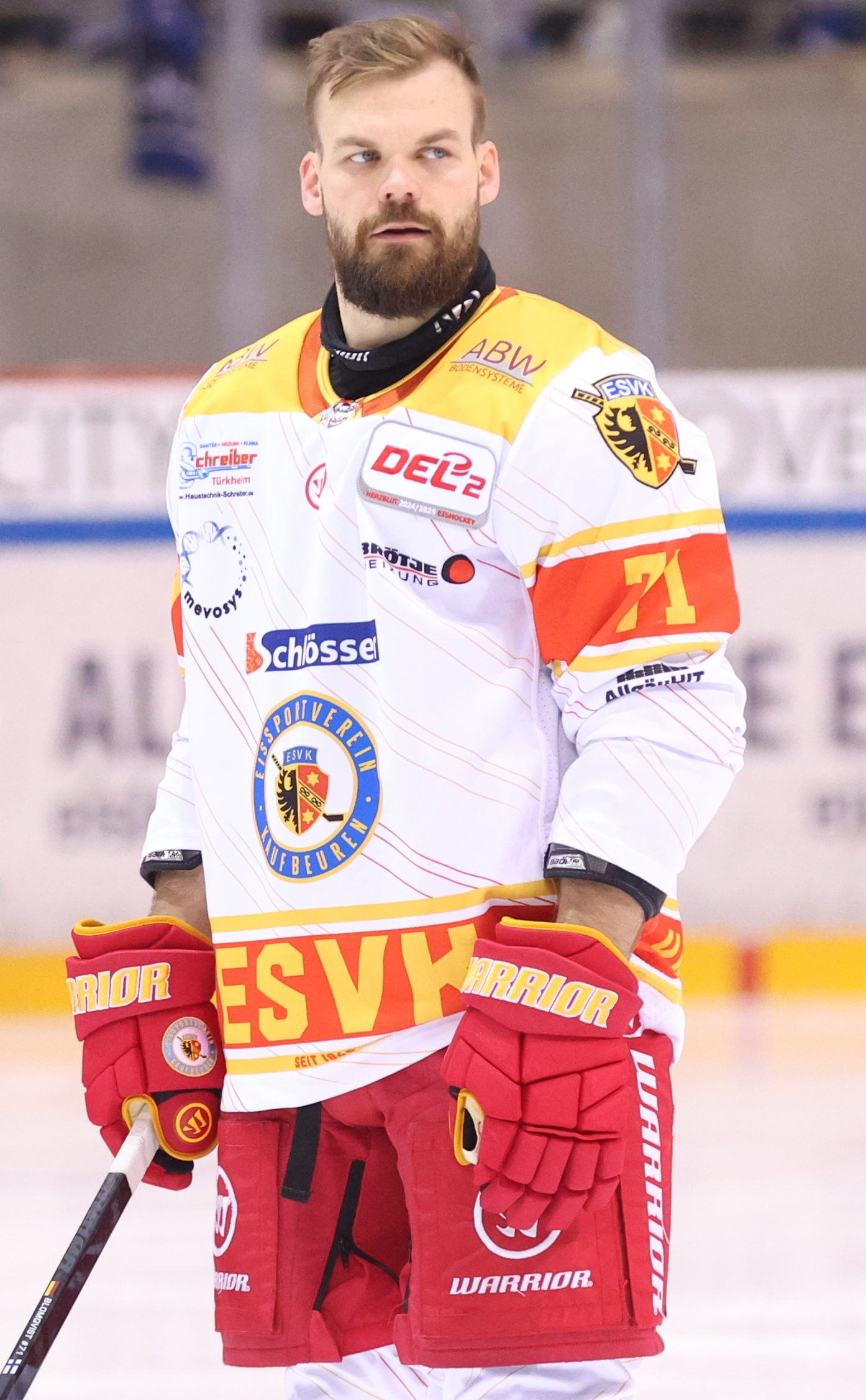
- Born: June 12, 1990 (age 34); Örnsköldsvik, Sweden
- Height: 5 ft 9 in (175 cm)
- Weight: 170 lb (77 kg; 12 st 2 lb)
- Position: Forward
- Shoots: Left
- DEL2 team: ESV Kaufbeuren
- NHL draft: Undrafted
- Playing career: 2007–present

Sami Blomqvist is a Finnish professional ice hockey player who currently plays for ESV Kaufbeuren of the DEL2.
