= Roope Ranta =

Finnish ice hockey player

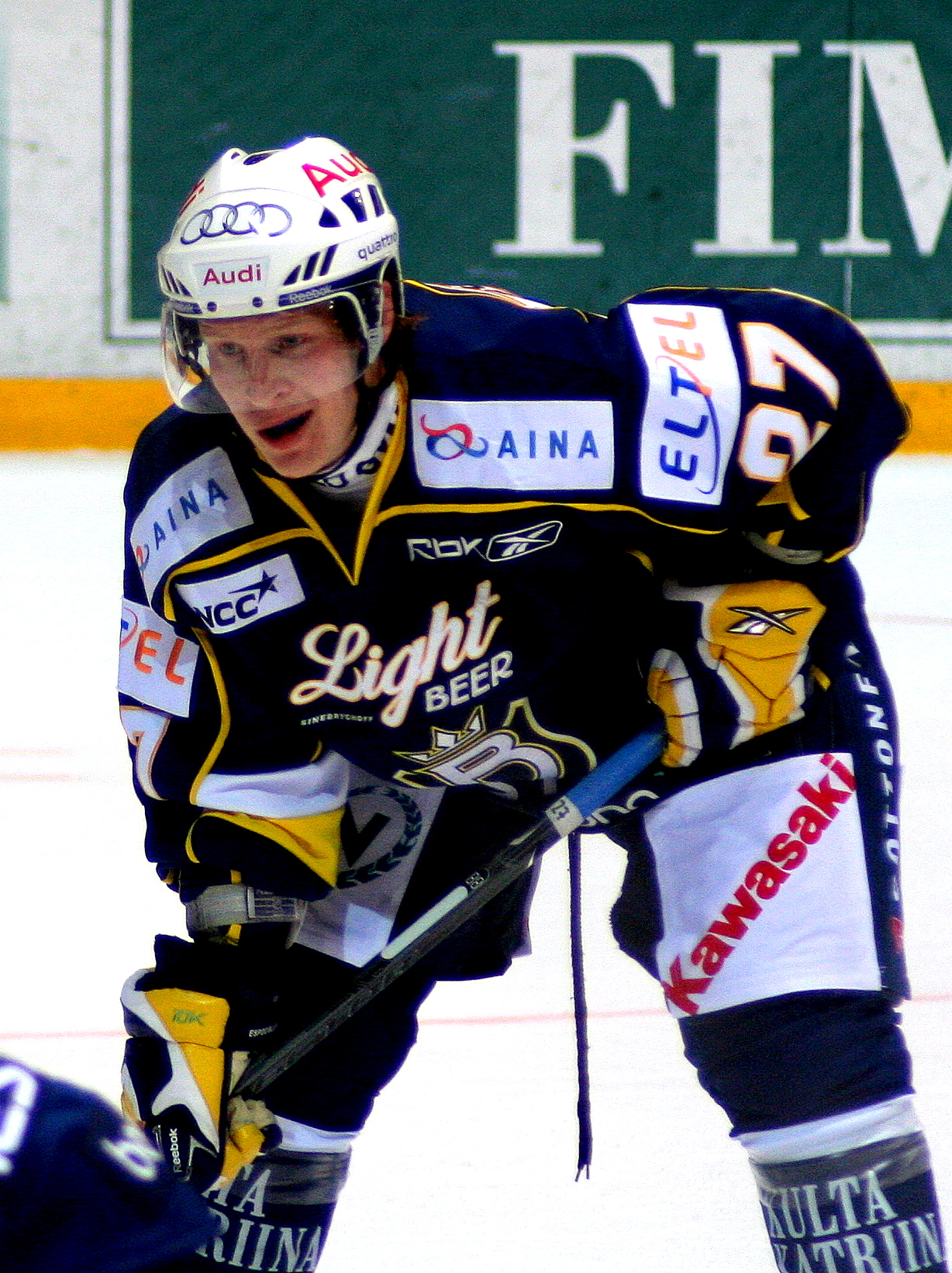
- Born: May 23, 1988 (age 38) Helsinki, Finland
- Height: 5 ft 7 in (170 cm)
- Weight: 156 lb (71 kg; 11 st 2 lb)
- Position: Forward
- Shoots: Right
- DEL2 team Former teams: SC Riessersee; Espoo Blues; SV Kaltern
- NHL draft: Undrafted
- Playing career: 2007–present

Roope Ranta (born May 23, 1988) is a Finnish professional ice hockey forward who currently plays for SC Riessersee of the German second-level league DEL2. Before he played mostly in Finland second-level league Mestis.

== Playing career ==
Roope Ranta started playing hockey in his hometown Helsinki. As a junior, he changed to Espoo Blues a team from Finland highest level league Liiga. He played for this team until 2012 in 75 games (25 points). At this time he was loaned to Finlands second-level league Mestis. He played also for Kiekko-Vantaa and Jokipojat. From season 2012–13, he played in the Mestis for Jokipojat, HC Keski-Uusimaa, Lempäälän Kisa and Mikkelin Jukurit. He was always one of the Top Scorers in his teams. In 2012-13 Mestis season he was the best assist (34 assists) in the Mestis. In 2015-16 Mestis season he has made the most points in playoffs, was voted for the All-Star game and won the championship with Jukurit.

In the 2014–15 season, he played some games for Sputnik Nizhny Tagil in Russian second level hockey league VHL and later for SV Kaltern in the highest level Italy hockey league Serie A before he changed back to Finland in January 2015.

For season 2016–17, Ranta changed to Germany's second-level league DEL2 and has played for Lausitzer Füchse. Since November 2016 he plays for SC Riessersee in the same league.
