= 2016–17 DEL2 season =

- League: DEL2
- Sport: Ice Hockey
- Duration: 10 September 2016 – 25 April 2017
- Games: 364 (52 per team)
- Teams: 14
- TV partner: Sprade TV

Regular season
- Season champions: Bietigheim Steelers
- Season MVP: Stefan Vajs (Kaufbeuren)
- Top scorer: Matt McKnight (Steelers)
- Relegated to Oberliga: Starbulls Rosenheim

Playoffs
- Champions: Löwen Frankfurt
- Runners-up: Bietigheim Steelers
- Finals MVP: Brett Jaeger (Frankfurt)

DEL2 seasons
- ← 2015–16 2017–18 →

The 2016–17 DEL2 season was the fourth season since the founding of the DEL2, the second tier of German ice hockey, set below the Deutsche Eishockey Liga. The season ran from 10 September 2016 till 25 April 2017. Bietigheim Steelers was crowned league premiers by finishing top of the regular season standings. Löwen Frankfurt claimed the championship title by defeating Bietigheim Steelers 4–2 in the final series. Starbulls Rosenheim lost the relegation playoffs 2–4 against ETC Crimmitschau and were relegated from DEL2 to Oberliga.

== Modus ==
Fourteen teams competed in the 2016–17 DEL2 regular season. EHC Bayreuth was promoted from Germany's third division, Oberliga. Each team played each other twice in the regular season, home and away, for a total of 52 matches each. The top six teams directly qualified for the championship playoffs, played in a best of seven format. Teams placed seven to ten advanced to the championship playoff qualifiers, which followed a best of three format. The bottom four teams enter the relegation playoffs. The two losing teams from round 1 face off in the relegation final with the losing team being relegated to Oberliga.

The DEL2 champion does not automatically get promoted to DEL. In September 2015, the DEL and DEL2 agreed to reintroduce promotion and relegation between the two leagues from the 2017–18 season onwards. The DEL2 champion would then have the opportunity to be promoted, provided it fulfilled the licensing requirements of the DEL, while the last-placed DEL club would be relegated.

== Regular season ==
=== Results ===
The cross table represents the results of all matches of the regular season. The home team is listed in the middle column, the visiting team in the top row.

First round														Team	Second round													
SCB	RVT	ECK	FRA	ECN	DRE	SBR	SCR	EPC	LFX	ESV	FRB	HNF	BTT	Team	SCB	RVT	ECK	FRA	ECN	DRE	SBR	SCR	EPC	LFX	ESV	FRB	HNF	BTT
	1:0	6:2	2:3^{O}	6:2	7:2	6:1	5:0	5:2	3:1	6:3	2:3	3:1	8:4	SCB		2:1^{S}	1:4	1:6	2:4	4:3	6:3	4:1	3:4^{O}	4:1	1:2	5:3	4:1	6:2
3:4^{S}		2:3	4:1	4:0	2:3	3:2	2:3^{S}	4:3^{S}	4:2	4:1	3:5	4:0	5:3	RVT	0:4		3:6	2:3^{O}	3:2	1:2^{O}	3:6	4:0	6:1	2:1^{S}	1:4	6:3	4:1	0:1
0:8	4:3^{O}		2:1	7:1	1:5	4:3	2:3	5:2	3:1	6:0	2:1^{O}	5:3	6:5	ECK	1:6	5:4		2:3	3:2	2:8	4:1	2:3	4:2	1:5	3:2	3:2^{S}	5:1	0:1
4:1	5:3	4:5^{O}		2:3^{O}	6:4	8:2	6:4	5:2	5:4	2:3^{O}	4:2	6:4	6:4	FRA	4:5	3:4^{O}	2:3		4:1	5:2	3:1	5:2	10:4	3:5	5:3	4:5	2:3^{O}	6:1
4:5^{O}	3:6	2:3	4:3^{O}		3:1	2:3	3:1	5:2	2:3	4:1	6:1	5:1	4:3^{S}	ECN	0:2	4:1	3:4	2:3^{S}		2:0	4:1	3:4^{S}	4:2	0:2	2:3^{O}	4:3^{S}	2:0	2:1
3:7	5:2	1:3	5:6	2:3^{S}		7:1	6:2	4:1	2:4	5:1	3:1	5:4	3:2	DRE	1:2	2:1	5:3	4:3^{O}	1:0		3:1	2:3	6:1	5:2	1:3	5:2	3:2^{O}	3:2^{O}
4:3	6:2	3:1	2:3	4:3	3:4		0:1	6:1	0:3	4:3	3:5	4:3	3:2^{O}	SBR	1:7	4:3^{O}	0:3	1:4	4:3	0:7		0:2	5:1	6:2	3:0	5:4^{O}	2:1^{O}	3:5
1:3	2:3^{O}	3:2^{S}	4:3	4:3	3:4^{S}	6:1		3:1	2:5	2:3	2:1^{S}	4:0	4:2	SCR	3:4^{S}	0:1	6:3	2:5	4:7	4:2	2:5		3:2	3:1	1:2^{O}	0:3	5:1	2:1^{S}
3:0	1:5	1:2	3:1	6:5^{S}	2:1	4:3^{O}	2:4		1:4	5:4^{S}	3:2	5:3	6:2	EPC	3:4^{O}	3:4	1:4	3:2	3:5	3:2	0:1	2:5		3:4^{O}	1:3	4:2	2:5	1:4
1:4	3:4	2:3	2:3^{S}	4:5^{S}	3:0	3:2^{S}	4:2	7:1		2:1^{S}	1:4	7:5	4:1	LFX	2:8	0:2	4:3	3:5	1:2	3:2	6:3	2:1	5:3		2:1	5:2	3:2	1:5
3:2^{O}	2:3	2:0	3:4^{O}	3:1	0:3	5:0	0:5	7:3	7:0		3:1	3:4	2:0	ESV	3:0	6:2	1:2^{S}	3:6	3:2	2:1^{S}	5:2	3:1	6:1	5:1		3:6	5:2	1:2
1:3	4:3^{O}	2:5	4:5	5:2	3:1	6:5^{O}	4:3	6:5^{O}	4:5^{O}	0:4		5:6^{S}	3:4	FRB	4:2	3:2	3:0	5:7	3:2^{S}	2:4	4:2	6:2	2:3	0:4	5:2		6:3	6:3
2:5	4:3	3:2^{O}	3:6	3:6	0:3	6:1	0:3	4:3^{O}	4:5^{S}	1:2	6:1		3:4^{S}	HNF	6:2	2:0	3:5	4:2	5:3	1:5	1:3	5:3	7:2	1:2^{S}	2:4	3:4		4:0
3:2	4:2	5:2	2:3	4:1	2:5	2:1	3:0	3:1	4:5^{O}	1:2^{O}	3:4^{S}	3:2^{O}		BTT	2:3	3:1	3:6	7:1	2:3	2:3^{O}	4:0	4:2	4:3	4:2	2:5	2:4	4:0	

Note: ^{O} Overtime; ^{S} Shootout

=== Standings ===
Pos	Team	GP	W	OTW	SOW	OTL	SOL	L	PTS	GF	GA	GD	PIM	HF	AF
1.	Bietigheim Steelers (P)	52	32	2	3	3	0	12	109	199	121	+78	654	18–1–2–5	14–4–1–7
2.	Löwen Frankfurt (C)	52	29	3	2	7	0	11	104	211	159	+52	681	17–0–5–4	12–5–2–7
3.	EC Kassel Huskies	52	28	3	2	1	1	17	96	161	147	+14	839	14–3–0–9	14–2–2–8
4.	Dresdner Eislöwen	52	25	5	1	0	2	19	89	169	128	+41	727	15–3–1–7	10–3–1–12
5.	ESV Kaufbeuren	52	24	5	1	1	3	18	88	148	125	+23	623	15–2–2–7	9–4–2–11
6.	Lausitzer Füchse	52	22	3	4	0	3	20	83	154	152	+2	722	13–2–2–9	9–5–1–11
7.	EHC Freiburg	52	20	3	2	2	5	20	77	170	177	−7	555	11–4–2–9	9–1–5–11
8.	EHC Bayreuth	52	21	1	1	5	3	21	75	146	155	−9	632	14–1–4–7	7–1–4–14
9.	SC Riessersee	52	20	0	5	2	2	23	74	135	147	−12	630	11–3–4–8	9–2–0–15
10.	Ravensburg Towerstars	52	19	2	2	5	3	21	73	144	145	−1	720	12–2–4–8	7–2–4–13
11.	EC Bad Nauheim	52	18	2	4	2	4	22	72	150	151	−1	590	12–3–4–7	6–3–2–15
12.	Starbulls Rosenheim (R)	52	16	3	1	2	1	29	59	130	183	−53	652	11–4–0–11	5–0–3–18
13.	Heilbronner Falken	52	12	3	1	3	3	30	50	141	185	−44	846	10–2–3–11	2–2–3–19
14.	ETC Crimmitschau	52	10	2	2	4	1	33	43	127	210	−83	819	9–3–2–12	1–1–3–21

Championship playoffs	Championship playoff qualifiers	Relegation playoffs

Points rules: 3 points for regulation win; 2 points for OT or SO win; 1 point for OT or SO loss; 0 points for regulation loss
Tie-break rules: 1) points; 2) head-to-head points; 3) head-to-head goal difference; 4) head-to-head number of goals scored.
(C) Champions; (P) Premiers; (R) Relegated

=== Top scorers ===
Name	Team	GP	G	A	PTS	PIM	+/−
Matt McKnight	Bietigheim Steelers	51	24	48	72	20	+21
Matthew Pistilli	Löwen Frankfurt	52	32	32	64	22	+34
C.J. Stretch	Löwen Frankfurt	52	26	34	60	66	+29
Roope Ranta	Riessersee/Füchse	51	26	31	57	34	+6
Juuso Rajala	Bad Nauheim/Dresden	48	14	42	56	14	−2
Christian Billich	EHC Freiburg	52	18	37	55	32	+18
Tyler Scofield	Starbulls Rosenheim	47	25	30	55	16	+2
Marcus Sommerfeld	Bietigheim Steelers	46	25	29	54	22	+12
Nikolas Linsenmaier	EHC Freiburg	51	20	34	54	103	+22
Tyler McNeely	Starbulls Rosenheim	45	21	33	54	48	+1

=== Top goaltenders ===
Name	Team	GP	SO	MP	GA	GAA	SH	SV	SV%
Kevin Nastiuk	Dresdner Eislöwen	25	1	1416:02	47	1.99	756	709	93.78%
Stefan Vajs	ESV Kaufbeuren	47	6	2840:26	99	2.09	1467	1368	93.25%
Tomas Vosvrda	EHC Bayreuth – Tigers	41	5	2311:35	102	2.65	1421	1319	92.82%
Andrew Hare	Heilbronner Falken	26	2	1555:18	79	3.05	965	886	91.81%
Markus Keller	EC Kassel Huskies	37	1	2160:12	100	2.78	1189	1089	91.59%
Matthias Nemec	SC Riessersee	40	4	2306:08	98	2.55	1149	1051	91.47%
Jonas Langmann	Ravensburg Towerstars	48	5	2863:32	127	2.66	1452	1325	91.25%
Stefan Ridderwall	Heilbronner Falken	24	0	1307:01	78	3.58	889	811	91.23%
Sinisa Martinovic	Bietigheim Steelers	46	5	2704:38	92	2.04	1045	953	91.20%
Lukas Mensator	EHC Freiburg	34	2	2015:10	105	3.13	1184	1079	91.13%

Note: To qualify for this list, goaltenders need to have played a minimum of 20 matches

== Playoffs ==
=== Championship ===
The championship play-offs:

The qualifiers for the playoffs ran between 7 March 2017 to 12 March 2017. Four teams (7v10 and 8v9) competed in best of three series’. The two winning teams advanced to the championship playoffs. In 2017, the two higher ranked teams in the qualifiers, EHC Freiburg and EHC Bayreuth, won their series and advanced to the playoffs. Ravensburg Towerstars and SC Riessersee were knocked out and their season ended.

The championship playoffs ran between 14 March 2017 to 25 April 2017. Eight teams competed in best of seven series'. The series winning teams advanced through from the quarter-finals to the final. In 2017, the top two seeds Bietigheim Steelers and Löwen Frankfurt each won their quarter and semi-finals to reach the final. The Lions defeated the league premiers 4–2 in the finals series to secure the division 2 championship title, their first DEL2 championship trophy.

First round
8	EHC Bayreuth	2
9	SC Riessersee	1
7	EHC Freiburg	2
10	Ravensburg Towerstars	1

Quarterfinals
1	Bietigheim Steelers	4
8	EHC Bayreuth	1
3	EC Kassel Huskies	4
6	Lausitzer Füchse	1
2	Löwen Frankfurt	4
7	EHC Freiburg	0
4	Dresdner Eislöwen	3
5	ESV Kaufbeuren	4

Semifinals
1	Bietigheim Steelers	4
4	ESV Kaufbeuren	0
(Pairings are re-seeded after the first and second round)
2	Löwen Frankfurt	4
3	EC Kassel Huskies	0

Finals
1	Bietigheim Steelers	2
2	Löwen Frankfurt	4

Note: All numbers represent series results, not a match score

=== Relegation ===
The relegation play-offs:

The relegation playoffs is contested between the four teams who finish bottom of the regular season standings. Run between 14 March 2017 and 11 April 2017, the four teams play best of seven series’. The teams that lose their first round advance to the second round. The winners secure their DEL2 status and avoid relegation. Whoever loses the second round is relegated to Oberliga. The 2017 edition saw Starbulls Rosenheim relegated to Oberliga after losing their first round series 2–4 against ETC Crimmitschau, who finished last in the regular season, before losing in six matches against ETC Crimmitschau in the second round.

Semifinals
11	EC Bad Nauheim	4
14	ETC Crimmitschau	1
12	Starbulls Rosenheim	2
13	Heilbronner Falken	4

Finals
12	Starbulls Rosenheim	2
14	ETC Crimmitschau	4

Note: All numbers represent series results, not a match score
