= Jonas Langmann =

German ice hockey player

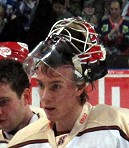
- Born: December 22, 1991 (age 33); Bad Kissingen, Germany
- Height: 1.89 m (6 ft 2 in)
- Weight: 84 kg (185 lb; 13 st 3 lb)
- Position: Goaltender
- Catches: Left
- DEL2 team Former teams: Ravensburg Towerstars; Iserlohn Roosters; Hannover Scorpions; Hamburg Freezers; Thomas Sabo Ice Tigers
- Playing career: 2009–present

Jonas Langmann (born December 22, 1991) is a German professional ice hockey goaltender who currently plays for the Ravensburg Towerstars in the DEL2. He previously played for the Hannover Scorpions.

Langmann played in the DEL2 before ending a six-year absence from the top flight DEL, by signing a two-year contract with the Thomas Sabo Ice Tigers on April 30, 2019.
